= Advance Stakes =

U.S. horse race (held 1899–1910)

- Class: Discontinued stakes
- Location: Sheepshead Bay Race Track; Sheepshead Bay, Brooklyn, New York, United States
- Inaugurated: 1899
- Race type: Thoroughbred – Flat racing

Race information
- Distance: 1 5/16 miles (10.5 furlongs)
- Surface: Dirt
- Track: left-handed
- Qualification: Three-year-olds & up
- Weight: Assigned

The Advance Stakes was an American Thoroughbred horse race run annually from 1899 through 1910 at the Sheepshead Bay Race Track in Brooklyn, New York. An important race open to horses age three and older, it was raced on dirt. The final running took place on June 27, 1910, and was won by Ballot for the second time.

== Historical notes ==
A race which regularly attracted many of the best horses of the day, it was won by such stars as future Hall of Fame inductees Imp and Peter Pan, the 1902 Champion Gold Heels, the 1903 Champion Africander whose six top wins that year included the Belmont Stakes, Suburban Handicap, Saratoga Cup, Lawrence Realization Stakes, and the winner of the 1905 Kentucky Derby and Tennessee Derby Agile.

In 1904, Irish Lad set a world record for a mile and three furlongs on dirt in winning the Advance Stakes and in 1908 Ballot set a new world record for a mile and five sixteenths on dirt.

== The end of a race and of a racetrack ==
On June 11, 1908, the Republican controlled New York Legislature under Governor Charles Evans Hughes passed the Hart–Agnew anti-betting legislation. The owners of Sheepshead Bay Race Track, and other racing facilities in New York State, struggled to stay in business without income from betting. Racetrack operators had no choice but to drastically reduce the purse money being paid out which resulted in the Advance Stakes offering a purse in 1909 that was less than one-fifth of what it had been in earlier years. These small purses made horse racing unprofitable and impossible for even the most successful horse owners to continue in business.

In spite of strong opposition by prominent owners such as August Belmont Jr. and Harry Payne Whitney, reform legislators were not happy when they learned that betting was still going on at racetracks between individuals and they had further restrictive legislation passed by the New York Legislature in 1910. The Agnew–Perkins Law, a series of four bills and recorded as the Executive Liability Act, made it possible for racetrack owners and members of its board of directors to be fined and imprisoned if anyone was found betting, even privately, anywhere on their premises. After a 1911 amendment to the law that would limit the liability of owners and directors was defeated in the Legislature, every racetrack in New York State shut down. As a result, the Advance Stakes was not run in 1911 and 1912.

Owners, whose horses of racing age had nowhere to go, began sending them, their trainers and their jockeys to race in England and France. Many horses ended their racing careers there and a number remained to become an important part of the European horse breeding industry. Thoroughbred Times reported that more than 1,500 American horses were sent overseas between 1908 and 1913 and of them at least 24 were either past, present, or future Champions. A February 21, 1913 ruling by the New York Supreme Court, Appellate Division saw horse racing return in 1913. However, it was too late for the Sheepshead Bay horse racing facility and it never reopened.

== Records ==
Most wins:

- Ballot (1908, 1910)

Most wins by a jockey:

- 3 – George Odom (1900, 1902, 1903)
- 3 – Joe Notter (1907, 1908, 1910)

Most wins by a trainer:

- 3 – James G. Rowe Sr. (1907, 1908, 1910)

Most wins by an owner:

- 3 – James R. Keene (1907, 1908, 1910)

== Winners ==
Year	Winner	Age	Jockey	Trainer	Owner	Dist. (Miles)	Time	Win$
1910	Ballot	6	Joe Notter	James G. Rowe Sr.	James R. Keene	15/16 M	2:10.00	$2,250
1909	Fitz Herbert	3	Vincent Powers	Sam Hildreth	Sam Hildreth	15/16 M	2:11.00	$1,925
1908	Ballot	4	Joe Notter	James G. Rowe Sr.	James R. Keene	15/16 M	2:09.60	$11,750
1907	Peter Pan	3	Joe Notter	James G. Rowe Sr.	James R. Keene	13/8 M	2:20.00	$11,750
1906	Flip Flap	3	Willie Knapp	A. J. Goldsborough	Jack A. Bennett	13/8 M	2:17.80	$11,750
1905	Agile	3	Jack Martin	Robert Tucker	Samuel S. Brown	13/8 M	2:20.80	$11,750
1904	Irish Lad	4	Gene Hildebrand	John W. Rogers	Herman B. Duryea & Harry Payne Whitney	13/8 M	2:17.60	$11,750
1903	Africander	3	George Odom	Richard O. Miller	Hampton Stable (Simon Deimel & Charles F. Dwyer)	13/8 M	2:19.00	$7,525
1902	Gold Heels	4	George Odom	Matthew M. Allen	Fred C. McLewee & Diamond Jim Brady	11/2 M	2:33.00	$3,800
1901	Star Bright	4	Nash Turner	John W. Rogers	William C. Whitney	11/2 M	2:33.20	$3,490
1900	Imp	6	George Odom	Charles E. Brossman	Daniel R. Harness	13/4 M	2:59.20	$4,540
1899	Thomas Cat	5	Frank O'Leary	William P. Burch	William C. Eustis	13/4 M	3:02.20	$3,320
