= Partridge Stakes =

American Thoroughbred horse race

- Class: Discontinued stakes
- Location: Sheepshead Bay Race Track; Sheepshead Bay, Brooklyn, New York, United States
- Inaugurated: 1890
- Race type: Thoroughbred – Flat racing

Race information
- Distance: 6 furlongs
- Surface: Turf
- Track: Left-handed
- Qualification: Two years old

The Partridge Stakes was an American Thoroughbred horse race held annually at Sheepshead Bay Race Track from 1890 through 1909. A race on turf over a distance of six furlongs (3/4 of a mile), it was open to two-year-old horses of either sex.

== Historical notes ==
In the 1891 Partridge Stakes Azra ran third to winner Rex but went on to win the 1892 Kentucky Derby.

The three-year-old gelding Dolly Spanker won the 1903 edition of the Partridge Stakes and went on to a long and successful career winning on both turf and dirt. A popular runner, the New York Times called Dolly Spanker "one of the best-know flat racers in the country" and had been "one of the best handicap horses on the Metropolitan tracks."

== The End of a Race and of a Racetrack ==
The 1908 passage of the Hart–Agnew anti-betting legislation by the New York Legislature under Republican Governor Charles Evans Hughes created havoc in the state's racing industry and would lead to a compete shutdown of racing in 1911 and 1912. The owners of Sheepshead Bay Race Track, and other racing facilities in New York State, struggled to stay in business without income from betting. Racetrack operators had no choice but to drastically reduce the purse money being paid out which resulted in the Partridge Stakes offering a substantially reduced purse in 1908 with further reduction in 1909 to where it less than one-sixth of what it had been in earlier years. These small purses made horse racing unprofitable and impossible for even the most successful horse owners to continue in business. A February 21, 1913 ruling by the New York Supreme Court, Appellate Division saw horse racing return in 1913. However, it was too late for the Sheepshead Bay horse racing facility and it never reopened.

== Records ==
Speed record:

- Ethereal @ 6 furlongs: 1:13 2/5 (1908)

Most wins by a jockey:

- 3 – Fred Taral (1890, 1895, 1897)

Most wins by a trainer:

- 3 – Green B. Morris (1890, 1891, 1899)

Most wins by an owner:

- 3 – Green B. Morris (1890, 1891, 1899)

== Winners ==
Year	Winner	Age	Jockey	Trainer	Owner	Dist. (Miles)	Time	Win $
1909	Glennadeane	2	Albert Walsh	Andrew G. Blakely	T. W. O'Brien	6 F	1:14.40	$350
1908	Ethereal	2	James Butler Jr.	John J. Hyland	Elkwood Park Stable	6 F	1:13.40	$1,050
1907	Johnnie Blake	2	David Nicol	William E. Phillips	Fred Cook	6 F	1:13.80	$2,545
1906	Fountainblue	2	Jack Martin	Matthew M. Allen	Diamond Jim Brady	6 F	1:14.00	$2,325
1905	Yankee Consul	2	Jack Martin	John W. May	Tippah Farms Stable	6 F	1:16.20	$3,050
1904	St. Bellane	2	George M. Odom	William Shields	Edward R. Thomas	6 F	1:14.20	$2,650
1903	Dolly Spanker	2	Willie Gannon	James G. Rowe Sr.	Foxhall P. Keene	6 F	1:15.60	$2,370
1902	Wild Thyme	2	Lucien Lyne	Thomas J. Healey	Andrew Miller	6 F	1:14.60	$2,500
1901	Gay Boy	2	Patrick A. McCue	Charles F. Hill	Clarence H. Mackay	6 F	1:15.00	$2,180
1900	Demurrer	2	Milton Henry	James J. McLaughlin	Anthony L. Aste	6 F	1:14.00	$1,800
1899	Water King	2	John Bullman	Green B. Morris	Green B. Morris	6 F	1:15.00	$1,910
1898	King Barleycorn	2	Nash Turner	H. Eugene Leigh	Ella O. Pepper	6 F	1:15.00	$860
1897	Central Trust	2	Fred Taral	Henry Harris	John E. McDonald	6 F	1:17.00	$1,150
1896	George Rose	2	J. Hill		Jim M. Murphy	6 F	1:16.00	$1,150
1895	One I Love	2	Fred Taral	John J. Hyland	William P. Thompson	6 F	1:15.20	$1,150
1894	Harry Reed	2	Willie Simms	Hardy Campbell Jr.	Michael F. Dwyer	6 F	1:14.40	$1,105
1893	Armitage	2	Samuel Doggett	Harry M. Mason	John G. Follansbee	6 F	1:16.60	$1,155
1892	Marshall	2	Samuel Doggett	Walter B. Jennings	Walter B. Jennings	6 F	1:16.80	$1,520
1891	Rex	2	Alexander Covington	Green B. Morris	Green B. Morris	6 F	1:16.20	$1,425
1890	Strathmeath	2	Fred Taral	Green B. Morris	Green B. Morris	6 F	1:15.60	$1,235
