= Waldorf Stakes =

- Class: Discontinued stakes
- Location: Sheepshead Bay Race Track; Sheepshead Bay, New York
- Inaugurated: 1904
- Race type: Thoroughbred – Flat racing

Race information
- Distance: 6 Furlongs
- Surface: Dirt
- Track: left-handed
- Qualification: Two-year-old colts & geldings

The Waldorf Stakes was an American Thoroughbred horse race held annually at Sheepshead Bay Race Track in Sheepshead Bay, New York. Open to two-year-old colts and geldings, it was run on dirt over a distance of six furlongs. First run in 1904, the Daily Racing Form reported that "The owner of the winner gives an elaborate dinner to the other subscribers to the event and its winning is an honor keenly coveted." However, the race had a very short tenure after passage of the Hart–Agnew anti-betting legislation by the New York Legislature which devastated horse racing. The winner's share of the purse for the Waldorf Stakes was always in the area of $6,000 but for what would prove to be its last running, the winner's share for 1908 was reduced by more than 70%. When a February 21, 1913 ruling by the New York Supreme Court, Appellate Division saw horse racing return it was too late for the Sheepshead Bay horse racing facility and it never reopened.

== Historical notes ==
The inaugural running of the Waldorf Stakes took place on September 7, 1904. It was won by Agile, a colt owned by prominent Pittsburgh businessman Samuel Brown. Agile would go on to win the 1905 Tennessee and Kentucky Derbys.

The 1906 Waldorf Stakes was won by Kentucky Beau in what would turn out to be the event's fastest time. Kentucky Beau was ridden by African American jockey Leroy Williams and trained by African American French Brooks for Runnymede Farm's Woodford Clay of the renowned Clay family of Kentucky.

The final running on September 9, 1908, was the second consecutive win for the Oneck Stable. Their colt Ben Fleet had won it in 1907 and Fashion Plate in this final year. Fashion Plate have a stellar career in racing with wins in the Brookdale, Edgemere, Long Island and prestigious Metropolitan Handicap, among others.

== Records ==
Speed record:

- 1:13 1/5 @ 6 furlongs : Kentucky Beau (1906)

Most wins:

- No horse won this race more than once.

Most wins by a jockey:

- No jockey won this race more than once.

Most wins by a trainer:

- 2 – William H. Karrick (1907, 1908)

Most wins by an owner:

- 2 Oneck Stable (1907, 1908)

== Winners ==
Year	Winner	Age	Jockey	Trainer	Owner	Dist. (Miles)	Time	Win $
1908	Fashion Plate	2	James Butler Jr.	William H. Karrick	Oneck Stable	6 F	1:13.40	$1,625
1907	Ben Fleet	2	Dave Nicol	William H. Karrick	Oneck Stable	6 F	1:15.20	$5,510
1906	Kentucky Beau	2	Leroy Williams	French Brooks	Woodford Clay	6 F	1:13.20	$5,875
1905	Vendor	2	Lucien Lyne	William H. Brooks	Francis R. Hitchcock	6 F	1:14.40	$6,375
1904	Agile	2	Tommy Burns	Robert Tucker	Samuel S. Brown	6 F	1:13.40	$6,000
