= Thomas H. Burns =

Personal information
- Born: 1879 Cedar Springs, Ontario, Canada
- Died: November 14, 1913 (aged 33–34) Brooklyn, New York
- Resting place: Holy Cross Cemetery, Brooklyn
- Occupation: Jockey

Horse racing career
- Sport: Horse racing

Major racing wins
- Kentucky Oaks (1897); Speed Stakes (1897); Crescent City Stakes (1898); Christmas Handicap (1898); Gaston Hotel Stakes (1898); Municipal Handicap (1898); Omnium Handicap (1898); Tennessee Derby (1898, 1906); Bayshore Stakes (1900); Morris Park Commando Stakes (1900); Grand Union Hotel Stakes (1900, 1901); Manhattan Handicap (1900, 1903); Occidental Handicap (1900); Second Special Stakes (1900); St. Louis Derby (1900); Crotona Handicap (1901, 1905); Dash Stakes (1901, 1904); Eclipse Stakes (1901); First Special Stakes (1901); Great American Stakes (1901); June Stakes (1901); Juvenile Stakes (1901); Long Island Handicap (1901, 1905); Sapphire Stakes (1901, 1904, 1905); Seagate Stakes (1901); Spinaway Stakes (1901); New Rochelle Handicap (1901, 1906); Woodmere Handicap (1901); Albany Handicap (1902); Bouquet Stakes (1902); Carlton Stakes (1902, 1903); Double Event Stakes (part 1) (1902); Flight Stakes (1902); Gazelle Stakes (1902); Grand Union Hotel Stakes (1902); Great Filly Stakes (1902); Harlem Stakes (1902, 1903); Huron Handicap (1902); Jamaica Stakes (1902); Mermaid Stakes (1902); Pansy Stakes (1902); Arverne Stakes (1903); Broadway Stakes (1903); Carlton Stakes (1903); Claremont Handicap (1903, 1905); Lissak Handicap (1903); Metropolitan Handicap (1903); Phoenix Handicap (1903); Rockaway Stakes (1903); Russet Stakes (1903); Surf Stakes (1903); Seneca Selling Stakes (1903); Brighton Handicap (1904); Dash Stakes (1904); Flying Handicap (1904); Lynbrook Handicap (1904); Newtown Stakes (1904); Patchogue Stakes (1904); Queens County Handicap (1904); Travers Stakes (1904); Twin City Handicap (1904); Undergraduate Stakes (1904); Waldorf Stakes (1904); Winged Foot Handicap (1904); Autumn Maiden Stakes (1905); Brooklyn Handicap (1905); Rosedale Stakes (1905); Saratoga Handicap (1905); Triumph Stakes (1905); Venus Stakes (1905); Washington Nursery Stakes (1905); Willow Handicap (1905); Tennessee Derby (1906); Tennessee Oaks (1906); Benning Handicap (1908)

Racing awards
- United States Champion Jockey by wins (1898, 1899)

Honors
- National Museum of Racing and Hall of Fame (1983); Canadian Horse Racing Hall of Fame (2011)

Significant horses
- Africander, Ben Holladay, Blue Girl, Broomstick, Imp, Gold Heels, Gunfire, Irish Lad, Joe Madden
- Updated on October 15, 2018

Thomas H. Burns (1879 – November 14, 1913) was a Canadian jockey in the sport of Thoroughbred horse racing who competed successfully in Canada, the United States, and in Europe. He was two-time North American Champion and a U.S. Racing Hall of Fame inductee in 1983 and a 2011 Legends inductee in the Canadian Horse Racing Hall of Fame.

== Career ==
Tommy Burns won his first race at age 16 at a racetrack in Hamilton, Ontario. His success in Canada led to riding in the United States where he got his first win in 1894 at a track in St. Paul, Minnesota.

== Personal life ==
Tommy Burns married Roslyn Dorothy McLaughlin, daughter of another U.S. Hall of Fame jockey Jim McLaughlin. Roslyn McLaughlin had previously been married to Richard Clawson, another outstanding young jockey but he too had died young from Consumption.
