= Flight Stakes (United States) =

- Class: Discontinued stakes
- Location: Sheepshead Bay Race Track; Sheepshead Bay, Brooklyn, New York, United States
- Inaugurated: 1887–1909
- Race type: Thoroughbred – Flat racing

Race information
- Distance: 7 furlongs (7/8 mile)
- Surface: Dirt
- Track: left-handed
- Qualification: All ages

The Flight Stakes was an American Thoroughbred horse race first run in 1887 at Sheepshead Bay Race Track in Sheepshead Bay, Brooklyn, New York. A race for horses of either sex and of all ages, it was run on dirt over a distance of seven furlongs.

An annual event, the Flight Stakes was last run in September 1909 and was won by Jack Atkin. After the Republican controlled New York Legislature under Governor Charles Evans Hughes passed the Hart–Agnew anti-betting legislation on June 11, 1908 with penalties allowing for fines and up to a year in prison. The owners of Sheepshead Bay Race Track, and other racing facilities in New York State, struggled to stay in business without betting. Racetrack operators had no choice but to drastically reduce the purse money being paid out which by 1909 saw the Flight Stakes offering a purse that was as little as one-fifth of what it had been in earlier years. Further restrictive legislation was passed by the New York Legislature in 1910 which deepened the financial crisis for track operators and led to a complete shut down of racing across the state during 1911 and 1912. When a Court ruling saw racing return in 1913 it was too late for the Sheepshead Bay horse racing facility and it never reopened.

== Records ==
Speed record: (at current distance of 1-1/16)

- 1:40.29 – Heatherten (1984) (new race and track record)

Most wins:

- 2 – Kingston (1890, 1892)
- 2 – Clifford (1894, 1896)
- 2 – Hamburg Belle (1904, 1905)
- 2 – Roseben (1906, 1907)

Most wins by a jockey:

- 2 – Fred Littlefield (1889, 1898)
- 2 – Fred Taral (1892, 1896)
- 2 – Henry Griffin (1894, 1895)
- 2 – Henry Spencer (1899, 1901)
- 2 – Lucien Lyne (1904, 1906)

Most wins by a trainer:

- 3 – A. Jack Joyner (1904, 1905, 1908)

Most wins by an owner:

- 2 – Michael F. Dwyer (1890, 1892)
- 2 – H. Eugene Leigh (1894, 1896)
- 2 – William C. Whitney (1902, 1903)
- 2 – Sydney Paget for J. B. A. Haggin (1904, 1905)

== Winners ==
Year	Winner	Age	Jockey	Trainer	Owner	Dist. (Miles)	Time	Win$
1909	Jack Atkin	5	James Butwell	John Powers	Barney Schreiber	7 F	1:26.00	$1,050
1908	Baby Wolf	4	Eddie Dugan	A. Jack Joyner	Harry P. Whitney	7 F	1:26.00	$4,180
1907	Roseben	6	Willie Knapp	Frank D. Weir	David C. Johnson	7 F	1:25.60	$4,780
1906	Roseben	5	Lucien Lyne	Frank D. Weir	Lucien O. Appleby	7 F	1:26.20	$5,200
1905	Hamburg Belle	4	Willie Davis	A. Jack Joyner	Sydney Paget †	7 F	1:25.00	$4,985
1904	Hamburg Belle	3	Lucien Lyne	A. Jack Joyner	Sydney Paget †	7 F	1:25.00	$5,925
1903	Leonora Loring	4	Arthur Redfern	John W. Rogers	William C. Whitney	7 F	1:25.20	$3,600
1902	Smoke	5	Tommy Burns	John E. Madden	William C. Whitney	7 F	1:29.60	$3,750
1901	Voter	7	Henry Spencer	James G. Rowe Sr.	James R. Keene	7 F	1:27.40	$3,350
1900	Heliobas	4	Winfield O'Connor	Edward L. Graves	Edward L. Graves	7 F	1:26.60	$2,880
1899	Bendoran	4	Henry Spencer	Walter B. Jennings	Walter B. Jennings	7 F	1:26.80	$2,740
1898	The Friar	4	Fred Littlefield	R. Wyndham Walden	A. H. & D. H. Morris	7 F	1:28.00	$2,120
1897	Requital	4	Alonzo Clayton	James G. Rowe Sr.	Lewis S. & William P. Thompson	7 F	1:26.60	$1,875
1896	Clifford	6	Fred Taral	H. Eugene Leigh	H. Eugene Leigh	7 F	1:29.20	$1,875
1895	Dorian	4	Henry Griffin	Byron McClelland	Blemton Stable	7 F	1:27.40	$1,875
1894	Clifford	4	Henry Griffin	H. Eugene Leigh	H. Eugene Leigh & Robert L. Rose	7 F	1:23.40	$2,925
1893	Dr. Hasbrouck	5	R. Harris	Henry Harris	William M. Barrick	7 F	1:29.60	$3,350
1892	Kingston	8	Fred Taral	Hardy Campbell Jr.	Michael F. Dwyer	7 F	1:26.60	$2,525
1891	Tenny	5	Shelby Barnes	William H. Karrick	David T. Pulsifer & W. H. Karrick	7 F	1:27.60	$2,225
1890	Kingston	6	W. Martin	Hardy Campbell Jr.	Michael F. Dwyer	7 F	walkover	$3,175
1889	Britannic	5	Fred Littlefield	R. Wyndham Walden	John A. Morris	7 F	1:26.60	$3,250
1888	Carroll	2	Freeman		Joe Cotton	7 F	1:28.20	$2,175
1887	Stuyvesant	3	Edward Garrison	John W. Rogers	Samuel S. Brown	7 F	1:28.00	$3,050

- † Hamburg Belle was always the property of James B. A. Haggin but as a convenience raced under the name of her manager, Sydney Paget.
