= Sapphire Stakes =

Sapphire Stakes may refer to:

- Sapphire Stakes (ATC), an Australian Turf Club horse race held at Randwick Racecourse in Australia
- Sapphire Stakes (Ireland), a horse race held at the Curragh Racecourse in Ireland
- Sapphire Stakes (United States), a horse race held at Sheepshead Bay Race Track in New York
