= Pansy Stakes =

- Class: Discontinued stakes
- Location: Sheepshead Bay Race Track; Sheepshead Bay, New York
- Inaugurated: 1890
- Race type: Thoroughbred – Flat racing

Race information
- Distance: 6 furlongs
- Surface: Turf
- Track: Left-handed
- Qualification: Two years old
- Purse: US$

The Pansy Stakes was an American Thoroughbred horse race run annually for twenty-one years from 1890 through 1910 at Sheepshead Bay Race Track at Sheepshead Bay, New York. Open to two-year-olds under selling conditions it was raced over a distance of six furlongs and, not very common at the time, on turf.

== Historical notes ==
The inaugural running of the Pansy Stakes took place on Friday, June 20, 1890. Sent off at 10-1 betting odds, Congressman William L. Scott's Vagabond upset the 2-1 favorite Lord Harry who would finish fourth.

Winged Foot, the 1896 winner, was owned, trained and ridden by John McCafferty.

The final edition of the Pansy Stakes was run on July 1, 1910 and was won by Peter Wimmer's filly Imprint.

== The End of a Race and of a Racetrack ==
Passage of the 1908 Hart–Agnew anti-betting legislation by the New York Legislature under Republican Governor Charles Evans Hughes led to a compete shutdown of racing in 1911 and 1912 in the state. The owners of Sheepshead Bay Race Track, and other racing facilities in New York State, struggled to stay in business without income from betting. Racetrack operators had no choice but to drastically reduce the purse money being paid out which resulted in the Pansy Stakes offering a purse in 1908 that was nearly 80% less than what it had been in earlier years. These small purses made horse racing unprofitable and impossible for even the most successful horse owners to continue in business. As such, for the 1910 racing season management of the Sheepshead Bay facility dropped some of its minor stakes races and used the purse money to bolster this turf race along with its most important events. A February 21, 1913 ruling by the New York Supreme Court, Appellate Division saw horse racing return in 1913. However, it was too late for the Sheepshead Bay horse racing facility and it never reopened.

== Records ==
Speed record:

- 1:12 4/5 @ 6 furlongs : Ethereal (1908)

Most wins by a jockey:

- No jockey won this race more than once.

Most wins by a trainer: (based on current info)

- 2 – John J. Hyland (1891, 1908)
- 2 – William P. Burch (1899, 1902)

Most wins by an owner:

- No owner won this race more than once.

== Winners ==
Year	Winner	Age	Jockey	Trainer	Owner	Dist. (furlongs)	Time	Win$
1910	Imprint	2	Jimmie Reid	Peter Wimmer	Peter Wimmer	6 F	1:13.00	$1,150
1909	Helen Carroll	2	J. "Buddy" Glass	Andrew G. Blakely	Andrew G. Blakely	6 F	1:15.00	$340
1908	Ethereal	2	Jack Upton	John J. Hyland	Elmwood Park Stable	6 F	1:12.80	$440
1907	Royal Vane	2	Eddie Dugan	William A. McKinney	Charles E. Durnell	6 F	1:15.00	$2,035
1906	Frank Lord	2	Walter Miller	Archie Zimmer	Timothy D. Sullivan	6 F	1:15.60	$1,755
1905	Anodyne	2	Harry W. Baird	W. H. Snyder	W. H. Snyder	6 F	1:14.00	$2,035
1904	St. Bellane	2	Herman Phillips	William Shields	Edward R. Thomas	6 F	1:13.40	$2,750
1903	Nameoki	2	Willie Gannon	Frank D. Weir	Frank J. Farrell	6 F	1:15.00	$2,170
1902	Sergeant	2	Tommy Burns	William P. Burch	Francis R. Hitchcock	6 F	1:16.80	$1,245
1901	Cameron	2	Winfield O'Connor	Harry M. Mason	John G. Follansbee & Davis	6 F	1:14.20	$780
1900	Moor	2	Patrick A. McCue	W. Fred Presgrave	Goughacres Stable	6 F	1:15.80	$680
1899	The Bobby	2	George M. Odom	William P. Burch	William C. Eustis	6 F	1:15.00	$1,070
1898	Sir Hubert	2	Tod Sloan	Thomas Welsh	C. Fleischmann's Sons	6 F	1:14.40	$1,105
1897	Central Trust	2	Harry Hewitt	Henry Harris	John E. McDonald	6 F	1:15.00	$1,170
1896	Winged Foot	2	John J. McCafferty	John J. McCafferty	John J. McCafferty	6 F	1:15.40	$1,150
1895	Merry Prince	2	Henry Griffin	A. Jack Joyner	Blemton Stable	6 F	1:16.20	$1,170
1894	Havoc	2	William Penn	David A. Boyle	David A. Boyle	6 F	1:15.60	$1,690
1893	Cataract	2	Willie Simms	John Huggins	Rancocas Stable (Pierre Lorillard IV)	6 F	1:15.00	$1,460
1892	Extra	2	Fred Littlefield		Brookwood Stable	6 F	1:17.00	$1,325
1891	Ha'penny	2	Marty Bergen	John J. Hyland	David Gideon & John Daly	6 F	1:17.00	$1,480
1890	Vagabond	2	Isaac Lewis	Charles Leighton	William L. Scott	6 F	1:16.40	$1,395
