= Irish Lad =

American Thoroughbred racehorse

- Circa 1902.
- Sire: Candlemas
- Grandsire: Hermit
- Dam: Arrowgrass
- Damsire: Enquirer
- Sex: Stallion
- Foaled: 1900
- Country: United States
- Colour: Dark Bay/Brown
- Breeder: H. Eugene Leigh
- Owner: 1) John E. Madden; 2) Westbury Stable (H. B. Duryea & H. P. Whitney)
- Trainer: 1) John E. Madden; 2) John W. Rogers
- Record: 33: 12-5-2
- Earnings: US$99,250

Major wins
- Flatbush Stakes (1902); Great Trial Stakes (1902); Saratoga Special Stakes (1902); Brooklyn Handicap (1903); Broadway Stakes (1903); Saratoga Champion Stakes (1903); Advance Stakes (1904); Metropolitan Handicap (1904)

Awards
- American Champion Two-Year-Old Colt (1902)

Honours
- Irish Lad Purse at Belmont Park
- Last updated on April 2, 2010

Irish Lad (1900–1925) was an American Thoroughbred Champion racehorse and a world record holder.

== Background ==
Irish Lad was bred by H. Eugene Leigh. In the fall of 1901 Leigh sold the yearling to John Madden for $2,550. Madden conditioned him for racing and brought him to the track in the spring of 1902.

== Racing career ==
Irish Lad showed enough potential that Herman Duryea and Harry Whitney paid $17,500 for him. Racing under the partners nom de course, Westbury Stable, and still trained by John Madden, Irish Lad won important races such as the Great Trial Stakes at Sheepshead Bay Race Track and the Saratoga Special Stakes. His 1902 performances earned him retrospective American Champion Two-Year-Old Colt honors.

Irish Lad at 1902 Saratoga Special Stakes beating Dazzling.

As a three-year-old, Irish Lad's training was taken over by John W. Rogers. His biggest win of 1903 came on May 28 in the Brooklyn Handicap at Gravesend Race Track in which he set a new stakes record time. Irish Lad set a new track record at Saratoga Race Course in winning the Saratoga Champion Stakes in a time of 2:05 flat for a mile and one-quarter.

In May 1904, four-year-old Irish Lad won the prestigious Metropolitan Handicap at Morris Park Racecourse then on June 26 at the Sheepshead Bay Race Track he set a world record of 2:17.60 for a mile and three eighths on dirt in winning the Advance Stakes over what the New York Times described as five of the best horses in the United States. Irish Lad came out of the July 9 Brighton Handicap badly lame and was retired but in May 1905 it was announced that he was back in training. In June 1905 Irish Lad finished ninth in an all-age handicap at Gravesend Race Track and shortly thereafter was retired to stud.

== Stud record ==
Irish Lad had sired only a few horses while at stud in the United States when the Legislature of New York passed the Hart–Agnew anti-betting law that resulted in the complete shutdown of racing. As a consequence, Irish Lad, along with other horses owned by Duryea such as Frizette, were sent to his newly acquired Haras du Gazon stud farm in Neuvy-au-Houlme in Lower Normandy, France. There, he also met with limited success but did notably sire Banshee, winner of the 1913 Poule d'Essai des Pouliches (French 1000 Guineas) and Pellsie who won the 1919 Prix de Diane (French Oaks).

Irish Lad died Haras du Gazon in 1925 of old age.

== Sire line tree ==
- Irish Lad
  - Blarney
    - Guido Reni
      - Bassam
        - Limber Hill
