= Thistle Stakes =

- Class: Defunct stakes
- Location: Sheepshead Bay Race Track, Sheepshead Bay, Brooklyn, New York, United States
- Inaugurated: 1902
- Race type: Thoroughbred – Flat racing

Race information
- Distance: 11/8 miles 1902–1909; 11/2 miles 1910
- Surface: Dirt & Grass
- Track: Left-handed
- Qualification: Three-year-olds & up

The Thistle Stakes was an American Thoroughbred horse race held annually at Sheepshead Bay Race Track from 1902 through 1910. An event open to horses of either sex aged three and older, it was contested on a dirt track until 1910 when it was run on the grass course. While the Thistle Stakes could only be run for nine years, it is one of the few in or around that same time frame where no horse, jockey, trainer or owner won it more than once.

== Effects of the Hart-Agnew law on the Thistle Stakes ==
The 1908 passage of the Hart-Agnew anti-betting legislation by the New York Legislature under Republican Governor Charles Evans Hughes would lead to a state-wide shutdown of racing in 1911 and 1912. In order to survive without income from wagering, the Sheepshead Bay Race Track had no choice but to drastically cut the purse money for all of their races. While Montfort’s 1908 victory in the Thistle Stakes brought his owner first-place money of $4,560, when Norbitt won the following year the 1909 winner’s share was just $430. With more than a year of racetrack and horse owner revenues dropping to unsustainable levels, the June 27, 1910 running of the Thistle Stakes on the grass course would prove to be its final edition. With just four horses entered, The Peer, a four-year-old gelding won by five lengths for owner Patrick Dunne and trainer Frank Hanlon.

It would be five years after Hart-Agnew became law that a February 21, 1913 ruling by the New York Supreme Court, Appellate Division saw horse racing return that year. However, by then it was too late for the Sheepshead Bay track as it had ceased all horse racing operations.

== Records ==
Speed record:

- 1:52.00 @ 11/8 miles: Dainty 1904 & Norbitt 1909

Most wins:

- no horse, jockey, trainer or owner won this race more than once

== Winners ==
Year	Winner	Age	Jockey	Trainer	Owner	Dist. (Miles)	Time	Win$
1910	The Peer	4	J. Buddy Glass	Frank Hanlon	Patrick Dunne	11/2	2:37.40	$560
1909	Norbitt	4	James Butwell	Walter S. House	Walter S. House	11/8	1:52.00	$430
1908	Monfort	4	Clifford D. Gilbert	Thomas J. Healey	Montpelier Stable	11/8	1:52.60	$4,560
1907	Grapple	5	Louis Beckman	Frank D. Weir	Frank J. Farrell	11/8	1:53.80	$3,035
1906	First Mason	6	Jack Martin	Charles E. Rowe	Charles E. Rowe	11/8	1:52.60	$2,865
1905	Go Between	4	John Diggins	Frank E. Brown	Charles F. Fox	11/8	1:55.00	$2,755
1904	Dainty	4	William Crimmins	Walter B. Jennings	Walter B. Jennings	11/8	1:52.00	$3,255
1903	Andy Williams	4	George M. Odom	Alexander Shields	Alexander Shields	11/8	1:55.00	$2,535
1902	Francesco	3	C. Creamer	Richard O. Miller	Charles F. Dwyer	11/8	1:53.80	$2,180
