= Brighton Handicap =

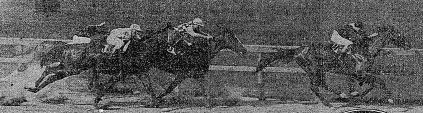
- Peter Pan (2nd from left) making his stretch run to win the 1907 Brighton Handicap
- Class: Discontinued
- Location: Brighton Beach Race Course, Brighton Beach, New York, USA (1896–1907): and -; Empire City Race Track, Yonkers, New York, USA (1910)
- Inaugurated: 1896–1910
- Race type: Thoroughbred – Flat racing

Race information
- Distance: 1 1/4 miles (10 furlongs)
- Surface: Dirt
- Track: left-handed
- Qualification: Three-years-old & up
- Weight: Assigned
- Purse: $25,000

The Brighton Handicap was an American thoroughbred horse race run annually from 1896 through 1907 at the Brighton Beach Race Course in Brighton Beach, Coney Island, New York and in 1910 at Empire City Race Track. Open to horses age three and older, it was contested on dirt over a distance of a mile and a quarter (ten furlongs).

A premier event, in the late 19th and early part of the 20th century the Brighton Handicap, along with the Suburban Handicap at Sheepshead Bay Race Track and the Metropolitan Handicap at Morris Park Racecourse, were the big three events of the Northeastern United States racing season.

== Race notes ==
On three occasions, 1902, 1903 and 1904, a new world record was set by the race winner. In a review of Peter Pan's win in the 1907 race in front of 40,000 fans, the New York Morning Telegraph was quoted as saying the horse "accomplished a task that completely overshadowed any previous 3-year-old performance in turf history."

Following passage of the Hart–Agnew anti-betting law by the Legislature of New York, Brighton Beach Race Course closed is doors permanently by the end of 1908. The Brighton Beach track had maintained the purse level for the Brighton Handicap by reducing purse money for other minor races or by eliminating them entirely. However, to survive, racetrack operators saw no choice but to drastically reduce the purse money being paid out which by 1910 saw an Empire City Race Track edition of the Brighton Handicap offer a purse which was one-quarter of what it had been.

== Records ==
Speed record:

- 2:02.80 – Broomstick (1904)

Most wins:

- No horse won this race more than once.

Most wins by a jockey:

- 2 – Willie Simms (1897, 1898)
- 2 – George Odom (1902, 1903)

Most wins by a trainer:

- 2 – James G. Rowe Sr. (1901, 1907)

Most wins by an owner:

- 2 – James R. Keene (1901, 1907)

== Winners ==
Year	Winner	Age	Jockey	Trainer	Owner	Dist. (Miles)	Time	Win US$
1910	Olambala	4	George Archibald	Thomas J. Healey	Richard T. Wilson, Jr.	11/4 M	2:06.60	$4,800
1908	– 1909	Race not held						
1907	Peter Pan	3	Joe Notter	James G. Rowe Sr.	James R. Keene	11/4 M	2:03.40	$19,750
1906	Ram's Horn	4	LaVerne Sewell	Wink S. Williams	Wink S. Williams	11/4 M	2:03.60	$19,750
1905	Artful	3	Gene Hildebrand	John W. Rogers	Harry Payne Whitney	11/4 M	2:04.80	$21,750
1904	Broomstick	3	Tommy Burns	Robert Tucker	Samuel S. Brown	11/4 M	2:02.80	$21,750
1903	Waterboy	4	George Odom	A. Jack Joyner	James B. A. Haggin	11/4 M	2:03.20	$15,995
1902	Gold Heels	4	George Odom	Matthew M. Allen	Frederick C. McLewee & Jim Brady	11/4 M	2:03.80	$8,045
1901	Toddy	4	Lewis Smith	James G. Rowe Sr.	James R. Keene	11/4 M	2:07.20	$8,640
1900	Jack Point	4	Milton Henry	Jim McLaughlin	Anthony L. Aste	11/4 M	2:04.60	$9,945
1899	Imp	5	Frank O'Leary	Charles E. Brossman	Daniel R. Harness	11/4 M	2:05.40	$8,420
1898	Ornament	4	Willie Simms	Charles T. Patterson	Charles T. Patterson	11/4 M	2:07.75	$2,490
1897	Ben Brush	4	Willie Simms	Hardy Campbell Jr.	Michael F. Dwyer	11/4 M	2:09.00	$1,850
1896	Nanki Pooh	4	Samuel Doggett	William Donohue	Erie Stable (F. D. & J. A. Beard)	11/4 M	2:12.75	$1,850
