= Belles Stakes =

- Class: Discontinued Stakes
- Location: Sheepshead Bay Race Track; Sheepshead Bay, New York, United States
- Inaugurated: 1886–1908
- Race type: Thoroughbred – Flat racing

Race information
- Distance: 5¾ Furlongs
- Surface: Dirt
- Track: left-handed
- Qualification: Two-year-old fillies

The Belles Stakes is an American Thoroughbred horse race held annually for two-year-old fillies from 1886 through 1908 at Sheepshead Bay Race Track in Sheepshead Bay, New York. The race was run on dirt and for its final seven editions at a distance of five and one-half furlongs.

== Historical notes ==
In 1889 the Belles Stakes was won by Reclare who was purchased by Henry Warnke for $475 at a July 1888 yearling sale. A working-class railroad employee, Warnke was a flagman with the Brighton Beach Railway and as a result of his filly's popularity fans and the media dubbed Reclare as "the flagman's filly." Going into her three-year-old campaign, a feature story in the April 1990 edition of The Illustrated American said that Reclare was "acknowledged the greatest of the two-year-old fillies of 1889."

La Tosca won the 1890 Belles Stakes and went on to be recognized as that year's American Champion Two-Year-Old Filly. She would repeat as the American Champion Filly in 1891.

Two years later, Lady Violet would also earn 1892 American Champion Two-Year-Old Filly honors.

1905 winner Whimsical also won that year's Golden Rod Stakes at Sheepshead Bay and notably went on to win the 1906 Preakness Stakes Classic.

== The Hart–Agnew law repercussions ==
On June 11, 1908, the Republican controlled New York Legislature under Governor Charles Evans Hughes passed the Hart–Agnew anti-betting legislation. The owners of Sheepshead Bay Race Track, and other racing facilities in New York State, struggled to stay in business without income from betting. Racetrack operators had no choice but to drastically reduce the purse money being paid out which resulted in the Belles Stakes offering a purse in 1908 that was forty percent less than what it had been in earlier years. These small purses made horse racing unprofitable and impossible for even the most successful horse owners to continue in business. As such, for the 1909 racing season management of the Sheepshead Bay facility dropped some of its minor stakes races and used the purse money to bolster its most important events. As a result, the Belles Stakes was not run in 1909.

=== The end of a racetrack ===
In spite of strong opposition by prominent owners such as August Belmont Jr. and Harry Payne Whitney, reform legislators were not happy when they learned that betting was still going on at racetracks between individuals and they had further restrictive legislation passed by the New York Legislature in 1910. The Agnew–Perkins Law, a series of four bills and recorded as the Executive Liability Act, made it possible for racetrack owners and members of its board of directors to be fined and imprisoned if anyone was found betting, even privately, anywhere on their premises. After a 1911 amendment to the law that would limit the liability of owners and directors was defeated in the Legislature, every racetrack in New York State shut down.

Owners, whose horses of racing age had nowhere to go, began sending them, their trainers and their jockeys to race in England and France. Many horses ended their racing careers there and a number remained to become an important part of the European horse breeding industry. Thoroughbred Times reported that more than 1,500 American horses were sent overseas between 1908 and 1913 and of them at least 24 were either past, present, or future Champions. When a February 21, 1913 ruling by the New York Supreme Court, Appellate Division saw horse racing return in 1913. However, it was too late for the Sheepshead Bay horse racing facility and it never reopened.

== Records ==
Speed record:

- 1:06.80 @ 5.5 furlongs – Petticoat (1908)
- 1:09.80 @ 5.75 furlongs – Amicitia (1901)
- 1:15.50 @ 6 furlongs – Bessie June (1886)

Most wins by a jockey:

- 2 – Henry Griffin (1894, 1896)
- 2 – Jack Martin (1902, 1905)
- 2 – Willie Simms (1891, 1892)

Most wins by a trainer:

- 3 – A. Jack Joyner (1892, 1904, 1908)

Most wins by an owner:

- 2 – James R. & Foxhall P. Keene (1894, 1900)
- 2 – Blemton Stable/August Belmont Jr. (1892, 1901)

== Winners ==
Year	Winner	Age	Jockey	Trainer	Owner	Dist. (Furlongs)	Time	Win$
1908	Petticoat	2	Eddie Dugan	A. Jack Joyner	Harry Payne Whitney	5.5 F	1:06.80	$1,050
1907	Explosion	2	Walter Miller	Thomas Welsh	Newcastle Stable	5.5 F	1:08.40	$2,525
1906	Kennyetto	2	Joe Notter	William Hayward Jr.	John Sanford	5.5 F	1:06.40	$2,625
1905	Whimsical	2	Jack Martin	Tim J. Gaynor	Tim J. Gaynor	5.5 F	1:07.40	$2,625
1904	Tradition	2	Lucien Lyne	A. Jack Joyner	Sydney Paget	5.5 F	1:06.20	$2,450
1903	Memories	2	Grover Fuller	Woodford Clay	Woodford Clay	5.5 F	1:06.00	$2,570
1902	Scioto	2	Jack Martin	Robert Tucker	Samuel S. Brown	5.5 F	1:07.60	$2,500
1901	Amicitia	2	John Bullman	John J. Hyland	August Belmont Jr.	5.75 F	1:09.80	$1,740
1900	Noonday	2	Danny Maher	James G. Rowe Sr.	James R. & Foxhall P. Keene	5.75 F	1:10.40	$1,890
1899	Musette	2	Willie Shaw	William Hayward Sr.	J. S. Ferguson	5.75 F	1:10.60	$1,660
1898	Black Venus	2	Nash Turner	H. Eugene Leigh	Ella O. Pepper	5.75 F	1:12.00	$1,880
1897	La Goleta	2	Tod Sloan	Jim Garland	Elias J. Baldwin	5.75 F	1:11.40	$1,430
1896	Cleophus	2	Henry Griffin	Hardy Campbell Jr.	Michael F. Dwyer	5.75 F	1:12.00	$1,425
1895	One I Love	2	Samuel Doggett	James G. Rowe Sr.	Brookdale Stable (Col. William Payne Thompson)	5.75 F	1:11.40	$1,425
1894	Irish Reel	2	Henry Griffin	William Lakeland	James R. & Foxhall P. Keene	5.75 F	1:11.40	$2,005
1893	Queenlike	2	Mr. Bryant	Thomas Clay McDowell	Thomas Clay McDowell	5.75 F	1:12.40	$1,675
1892	Lady Violet	2	Willie Simms	A. Jack Joyner	Blemton Stable	5.75 F	1:11.80	$1,690
1891	Promenade	2	Willie Simms		Labold Bros.	5.75 F	1:11.00	$2,040
1890	La Tosca	2	Anthony Hamilton	James G. Rowe Sr.	August Belmont Sr.	5.75 F	1:08.40	$2,130
1889	Reclare	2	Marty Bergen	Henry Warnke Jr.	Henry Warnke & Son	5.75 F	1:10.60	$2,095
1888	Sonoma	2	Casey Winchell	Matthew Byrnes	James B. A. Haggin	6 F	1:17.60	$1,890
1887	Bandusia	2	George Church	John Huggins	Alexander J. Cassatt	6 F	1:16.50	$1,500
1886	Bessie June	2	Jim McLaughlin	Frank McCabe	Dwyer Brothers Stable	6 F	1:15.50	$1,850
