= Ocean Handicap =

Defunct American Thoroughbred horse race

- Class: Discontinued stakes
- Location: Sheepshead Bay Race Track; Sheepshead Bay, Brooklyn, New York
- Inaugurated: 1894–1909
- Race type: Thoroughbred – Flat racing

Race information
- Distance: 1 mile (8.0 furlongs; 1.6 km)
- Surface: Dirt
- Track: left-handed
- Qualification: Three-years-old and up

The Ocean Handicap was an American Thoroughbred horse race held annually at Sheepshead Bay Race Track in Sheepshead Bay, Brooklyn, New York from 1894 thru 1909. A race for horses of either sex age three and older, it was run on dirt over a distance of 1 mile. The Ocean Handicap was the second of the track's autumn serials, coming after the Fall Handicap at 13/16 mi (6.5 furlongs; 1.3 km) and before the Omnium Handicap at 1 1/8 miles (9.0 furlongs; 1.8 km).

The 1904 running of the Ocean Handicap was won by Walter Jennings very good filly Dainty who beat Alan-a-Dale, winner of the 1902 Kentucky Derby.

The final running of the Ocean Handicap was won by King James, owned and trained by future U.S. Racing Hall of Fame inductee Sam Hildreth. King James had not run in the Fall Handicap but went on to earn his second win of the autumn serials with a victory in the Omnium Handicap. His performance for the year would earn him recognition as the American Champion Older Horse of 1909.

== Demise of the Ocean Handicap ==
After years of uncertainty, on June 11, 1908 the Republican controlled New York Legislature under Governor Charles Evans Hughes passed the Hart–Agnew anti-betting legislation with penalties allowing for fines and up to a year in prison. The owners of Sheepshead Bay Race Track, and other racing facilities in New York State, struggled to stay in business without income from betting. Racetrack operators had no choice but to drastically reduce the purse money being paid out which resulted in the Ocean Handicap offering a purse in 1909 that was one-third of what it had been in earlier years. These small purses made horse racing highly unprofitable and impossible for even the most successful horse owners to continue in business. As such, for the 1910 racing season management of the Sheepshead Bay facility dropped some of its less important stakes races and used the purse money to bolster its most important events. The effect was to place the Ocean Handicap on hiatus. Further restrictive legislation was passed by the New York Legislature in 1910 which deepened the financial crisis for track operators and after a 1911 amendment to the law to limit the liability of owners and directors was defeated, every racetrack in New York State shut down. Owners, whose horses of racing age had nowhere to go, began sending them, their trainers and their jockeys to race in England and France. Many horses ended their racing careers there, and a number remained to become an important part of the European horse breeding industry. Thoroughbred Times reported that more than 1,500 American horses were sent overseas between 1908 and 1913 and of them at least 24 were either past, present, or future Champions. When a February 21, 1913 ruling by the New York Supreme Court, Appellate Division Court saw horse racing return in 1913 it was too late for the Sheepshead Bay horse racing facility and it never reopened.

== Records ==
Speed record:

- 1 mile : 1:37.80 – King James (1909)

Most wins:

- No horse ever won this race more than once

Most wins by a jockey:

- 2 – Henry Spencer (1900, 1901)
- 2 – Eddie Dugan (1907, 1909)

Most wins by a trainer:

- 3 – Walter B. Jennings (1898, 1904, 1905)

Most wins by an owner:

- 3 – Walter B. Jennings (1898, 1904, 1905)

== Winners ==
Year	Winner	Age	Jockey	Trainer	Owner	Dist. (Miles)	Time	Win$
1909	King James	4	Eddie Dugan	Sam Hildreth	Sam Hildreth	1 M	1:37.80	$1,125
1908	Half Sovereign	3	James Butler Jr.	John Whalen	August Belmont Jr.	1 M	1:38.60	$1,125
1907	Dandelion	5	Eddie Dugan	John E. Madden	Francis R. Hitchcock	1 M	1:40.00	$2,880
1906	Tiptoe	3	Henry Horner	John Whalen	August Belmont Jr.	1 M	1:38.60	$3,320
1905	Proper	5	Willie Knapp	Walter B. Jennings	Walter B. Jennings	1 M	1:41.20	$3,300
1904	Dainty	4	Gene Hildebrand	Walter B. Jennings	Walter B. Jennings	1 M	1:39.00	$3,180
1903	Hermis	4	George M. Odom	Alexander Shields	Edward R. Thomas	1 M	1:39.80	$2,100
1902	Colonel Bill	3	Harry Michaels	James H. McCormick	Louis V. Bell	1 M	1:39.40	$1,450
1901	Ten Candles	4	Henry Spencer	William Lakeland	William Lakeland	1 M	1:38.60	$1,450
1900	Voter	6	Henry Spencer	James G. Rowe Sr.	James R. Keene	1 M	1:39.40	$1,450
1899	Imp	5	Peter Clay	Charles E. Brossman	Daniel R. Harness	1 M	1:40.20	$1,150
1898	Briar Sweet	3	Danny Maher	Walter B. Jennings	Walter B. Jennings	1 M	1:40.80	$1,150
1897	Belmar	5	Tod Sloan	William C. Smith	George E. Smith	1 M	1:41.00	$1,125
1896	Buck Massie	4	John Hill	J. Healy	James M. Murphy	1 M	1:41.00	$1,125
1895	Henry Young	5	Alonzo Clayton		Pastime Stable (Nick Finzer)	1 M	1:39.80	$1,125
1894	Domino	3	Fred Taral	William Lakeland	James R. & Foxhall P. Keene	1 M	1:40.20	$1,450
