= Flying Handicap =

Former American thoroughbred horse race

- Class: Discontinued stakes
- Location: Sheepshead Bay Race Track; Sheepshead Bay, Brooklyn, New York, United States
- Inaugurated: 1893–1909
- Race type: Thoroughbred – Flat racing

Race information
- Distance: 6 1/2 furlongs (.81 miles)
- Surface: Dirt
- Track: left-handed
- Qualification: Three years old

The Flying Handicap was an American Thoroughbred horse race run from 1893 through 1909 at Sheepshead Bay Race Track in Sheepshead Bay, Brooklyn, New York. A race for three-year-old horses of either sex, it was last run on dirt over a distance of 6 1/2 furlongs.

== Historical notes ==
Future Hall of Fame horses who won the Flying Handicap include Domino in 1894 and Broomstick in 1904.

Hall of Fame inductee George M. Odom won this race both as a jockey (1903) and as a trainer/owner (1909).

== The 1911–1912 statewide shutdown of horse racing ==
On June 11, 1908, the Republican controlled New York Legislature under Governor Charles Evans Hughes passed the Hart–Agnew anti-betting legislation with penalties allowing for fines and up to a year in prison.

In spite of strong opposition by prominent owners such as August Belmont, Jr. and Harry Payne Whitney, reform legislators were not happy when they learned that betting was still going on at racetracks between individuals and they had further restrictive legislation passed by the New York Legislature in 1910 that made it possible for racetrack owners and members of its board of directors to be fined and imprisoned if anyone was found betting, even privately, anywhere on their premises. After a 1911 amendment to the law to limit the liability of owners and directors was defeated, every racetrack in New York State shut down. As a result, the Flying Handicap was not run in 1911 and 1912.

Owners, whose horses of racing age had nowhere to go, began sending them, their trainers and their jockeys to race in England and France. Many horses ended their racing careers there and a number remained to become an important part of the European horse breeding industry. Thoroughbred Times reported that more than 1,500 American horses were sent overseas between 1908 and 1913 and of them at least 24 were either past, present, or future Champions. When a February 21, 1913 ruling by the New York Supreme Court, Appellate Division Court saw horse racing return in 1913 it was too late for the Sheepshead Bay horse racing facility and it never reopened.

== Records ==
Speed record:

- 1:18.40 @ 6.5 furlongs (4,300 ft; 1,300 m) – Spooner (1908)
- 1:12.80 @ 6 furlongs (4,000 ft; 1,200 m) – Dublin (1901)
- 1:10.00 @ 5 3/4 furlongs (3,800 ft; 1,200 m) – Domino (1894)

Most wins by a jockey:

- 2 – Fred Taral (1894, 1895)

Most wins by a trainer:

- 3 – Sam Hildreth (1895, 1899, 1900)

Most wins by an owner:

- 2 – Newcastle Stable (1903, 1906)

== Winners ==
Year	Winner	Age	Jockey	Trainer	Owner	Dist. (Miles)	Time	Win$
1909	Prince Gal	3	James Butwell	George M. Odom	George M. Odom	6.5 F	1:20.20	$1,050
1908	Spooner	3	Clifford D. Gilbert	Max Hirsch	Frederick B. Lemaire	6.5 F	1:18.40	$1,050
1907	Baby Wolf	3	Joe Notter	John W. Rogers	Harry Payne Whitney	6 F	1:15.00	$2,500
1906	Inquisitor	3	Walter Miller	Thomas Welsh	Newcastle Stable	6 F	1:13.20	$2,750
1905	Oxford	3	Lucien Lyne	James J. McLaughlin	James J. McLaughlin	6 F	1:14.00	$2,600
1904	Broomstick	3	Tommy Burns	Robert Tucker	Samuel S. Brown	6 F	1:13.60	$2,600
1903	Shot Gun	3	George M. Odom	Thomas Welsh	Newcastle Stable	6 F	1:14.60	$1,770
1902	Hatasoo	3	Willie Shaw	Julius Bauer	Arthur Featherstone	6 F	1:13.00	$2,050
1901	Dublin	3	Patrick A. McCue	W. Fred Presgrave	Goughacres Stable	6 F	1:12.80	$1,750
1900	Vulcain	3	Milton Henry	Sam Hildreth	Sam Hildreth	6 F	1:13.40	$1,400
1899	Toluca	3	Richard Clawson	Sam Hildreth	Sydney Paget	6 F	1:14.00	$1,430
1898	Bendoran	3	Danny Maher	Walter Jennings	Walter Jennings	6 F	1:14.40	$1,280
1897	Casseopia	3	Fred Littlefield	R. Wyndham Walden	Alfred H. & Dave H. Morris	6 F	1:15.20	$1,450
1896	Refugee	3	Tod Sloan	William M. Wallace	William M. Wallace	6 F	1:16.00	$1,400
1895	Rey del Caredes	3	Fred Taral	Sam Hildreth	Santa Anita Stable	5.75 F	1:11.40	$1,400
1894	Domino	3	Fred Taral	William Lakeland	James R. & Foxhall P. Keene	5.75 F	1:10.00	$1,475
1893	Cactus	3	Monk Overton	David Gideon	David Gideon & John Daly	5.75 F	1:11.60	$1,095
