= Test Handicap =

- Class: Discontinued stakes
- Location: Brighton Beach Race Course; Brighton Beach, New York, United States
- Inaugurated: 1896–1910
- Race type: Thoroughbred – Flat racing

Race information
- Distance: 1 mile (8 furlongs)
- Surface: Dirt
- Track: left-handed
- Qualification: Three-years-old and up

The Test Handicap was an American Thoroughbred horse race first run on July 25, 1896 at Brighton Beach Race Course in Brighton Beach, Brooklyn, New York where it continued annually through 1909. A race for horses age three and older, it was run on dirt over a distance of one mile.

On June 11, 1908, the Republican controlled New York Legislature under Governor Charles Evans Hughes passed the Hart–Agnew anti-wagering bill. The owners of Brighton Beach Race Course and other racing facilities in New York State struggled to stay in business without wagering revenue. Racetrack owners had no choice but to drastically reduce the purse money being paid out which saw important stakes worth as little as twenty-five percent of what they were just two years earlier. Although the Test Handicap had been scheduled for July 23, 1908, all stakes races were canceled at Brighton Beach Race Course and put on hiatus.

There was no Test Handicap in 1908 and 1909 but the following year Empire City Race Track took over the race dates belonging to the Bright Beach Race Course and in 1910 hosted the Test Handicap. The race was won by Everett, a three-year-old colt owned by James Francis Johnson's Quincy Stable. However, further restrictive legislation was passed by the New York Legislature in 1910 which resulted in the deepening of the financial crisis for track operators and led to a complete shut down of racing across the state during 1911 and 1912. When a Court ruling saw racing return in 1913 it was too late for the Brighton Beach facility and it never reopened.

== Records ==
Speed record: (at 1 mile)

- 1:38.00 – Voter (1900) (New World Record).
- 1:38.00 – Hermis (1904)

Most wins by a jockey:

- 2 – Danny Maher (1898, 1899)

Most wins by a trainer:

- 3 – Thomas Welsh (1897, 1901, 1903)

Most wins by an owner:

- 2 – Julius Fleischmann (1897, 1903)
- 2 – James R. Keene (1900, 1905)

== Winners ==
Year	Winner	Age	Jockey	Trainer	Owner	Dist. (Miles) (Furlongs)	Time	Win US$
1910	Everett	3	Joe McCahey	George Cornnell	Quincy Stable	1 M	1:39.20	$1,420
1909	– 1908	Race not held						
1907	Dreamer	5	G. W. Brussel	John Huggins	Herman B. Duryea	1 M	1:38.20	$3,830
1906	Coy Maid	4	Ted Koerner	John I. Smith	Kenilworth Stable (Frederick C. McLewee)	1 M	1:39.60	$3,445
1905	Wild Mint	3	Lucien Lyne	James G. Rowe Sr.	James R. Keene	1 M	1:39.20	$3,350
1904	Hermis	5	Arthur Redfern	William Shields	Edward R. Thomas	1 M	1:38.00	$4,275
1903	Hurstbourne	3	George M. Odom	Thomas Welsh	Julius Fleischmann	6 F	1:13.40	$2,770
1902	Cameron	3	Winfield O'Connor	Harry A. Mason	John G. Follansbee	6 F	1:12.60	$1,940
1901	The Musketeer	3	Willie Shaw	Thomas Welsh	Frank J. Farrell	6 F	1:14.20	$2,030
1900	Voter	6	Henry Spencer	James G. Rowe Sr.	James R. Keene	1 M	1:38.00	$1,510
1899	Firearm	4	Danny Maher	Jim Boden	Jim Boden	1 M	1:42.00	$980
1898	Miss Tenny	3	Danny Maher	William H. Karrick	David T. Pulsifer & W. H. Karrick	1 M	1:40.25	$1,230
1897	Lehman	6	Joseph Scherrer	Thomas Welsh	Fleischmann & Son	1 M	1:41.25	$1,420
1896	Rubicon	5	Tod Sloan	Henry Harris	J. E. McDonald	1 M	1:41.75	$1,130
