= Ildrim =

American-bred Thoroughbred racehorse

- Sire: Kingston
- Grandsire: Spendthrift
- Dam: Libbie L
- Damsire: Bramble
- Sex: Stallion
- Foaled: 1897
- Country: United States
- Colour: Black
- Breeder: A. P. Goodring
- Owner: H. Eugene Leigh
- Trainer: H. Eugene Leigh
- Record: Not found
- Earnings: Not found

Major wins
- Baychester Stakes (1900) American Classic Race wins: Belmont Stakes (1900)
- Last updated on August 9, 2008

Ildrim (foaled in 1897) was an American Thoroughbred racehorse best known for winning the 1900 Belmont Stakes at Morris Park Racecourse in The Bronx, New York under future U.S. Racing Hall of Fame jockey, Nash Turner.

At age three, Ildrim also won the Baychester Stakes, ran second in the important Lawrence Realization at Sheepshead Bay Race Track, and was third in the Withers Stakes at Morris Park.
