= Russet Stakes =

- Class: Discontinued stakes
- Location: Sheepshead Bay Race Track; Sheepshead Bay, Brooklyn, New York, United States
- Inaugurated: 1895–1909
- Race type: Thoroughbred – Flat racing

Race information
- Distance: 1½ miles (12 furlongs)
- Surface: Turf
- Track: Left-handed
- Qualification: Three years old & up

The Russet Stakes was an American Thoroughbred horse race on turf held annually from 1895 through 1909 at Sheepshead Bay Race Track in Sheepshead Bay, Brooklyn, New York. Open to horses age three and older and run at a distance of 1½ miles, it was an event that attracted mainly stayers who were best at longer distances.

== Historical notes ==
On June 10, 1886, the Coney Island Jockey Club opened the first turf racecourse in the United States. In 1895, the inaugural running of the Russet Stakes was won by Montana Copper King Marcus Daly's British-born import Bathampton. The four-year-old horse was ridden by future U. S. Racing Hall of Fame inductee Fred Taral and trained by another future U. S. Racing Hall of Fame inductee, Matthew Byrnes. The final running on September 9, 1909, was won by Bonnie Kelso, a $140 yearling purchase who set a new course record. Bonnie Kelso's owner/trainer and future Hall of Fame inductee George Odom had won the 1904 Russet as a jockey aboard Goughacre Stable's Shorthose.

== The end of a race and of a racetrack ==
On June 11, 1908, the Republican controlled New York Legislature under Governor Charles Evans Hughes passed the Hart–Agnew anti-betting legislation. The owners of Sheepshead Bay Race Track, and other racing facilities in New York State, struggled to stay in business without income from betting. Racetrack operators had no choice but to drastically reduce the purse money being paid out which resulted in the Russet Stakes offering a purse in 1909 that was less than one-third of what it had been in earlier years. These small purses made horse racing unprofitable and impossible for even the most successful horse owners to continue in business. As such, for the 1910 racing season management of the Sheepshead Bay facility dropped some of its minor stakes races and used the purse money to bolster its most important events. Further restrictive legislation was passed by the New York Legislature in 1910 which resulted in the deepening of the financial crisis for track operators and led to a complete shut down of racing across the state during 1911 and 1912. When a Court ruling saw racing return in 1913 it was too late for the Sheepshead Bay facility and it never reopened.

== Records ==
Speed record:

- 2:32.40 – Bonnie Kelso (1909)

Most wins:

- no horse won this race more than once

Most wins by a jockey:

- 2 – Tod Sloan (1897, 1898)
- 2 – Winfield O'Connor (1899, 1901)

Most wins by a trainer:

- no trainer won this race more than once

Most wins by an owner:

- no owner won this race more than once

== Winners ==
Year	Winner	Age	Jockey	Trainer	Owner	Dist. (Miles)	Time	Win$
1909	Bonnie Kelso	3	Jack Upton	George Odom	George Odom	12 F	2:32.40	$1,050
1908	Bedouin	6	Dalton McCarthy	John Huggins	E. W. Jewett	12 F	2:37.60	$1,050
1907	Miss Crawford	6	Eddie Dugan	J. Davis	William W. Darden	12 F	2:33.00	$3,250
1906	Outcome	5	Walter Miller	French Brooks	Woodford Clay	12 F	2:35.60	$3,165
1905	Jacquin	4	Frank O'Neill	H. C. McLaughlin	Lucien O. Appleby	12 F	2:37.00	$3,550
1904	Shorthose	4	George Odom	W. Fred Presgrave	Goughacres Stable	12 F	2:34.20	$3,300
1903	Caughnawaga	4	Tommy Burns	William Hayward Jr.	John Sanford	12 F	2:35.00	$2,300
1902	The Rival	3	Harry Michaels	John E. Madden	John E. Madden	12 F	2:33.80	$2,370
1901	Water Cure	4	Winfield O'Connor	Green B. Morris	Green B. Morris	12 F	2:38.20	$1,680
1900	Maid of Harlem	4	John Slack		Osceola Stable (Thomas L. Watt)	12 F	2:35.00	$1,770
1899	Prince McClurg	3	Winfield O'Connor	James H. McEvoy	J. H. McEvoy & Co.	12 F	2:38.20	$1,450
1898	Thomas Cat	4	Tod Sloan	William P. Burch	William C. Eustis	12 F	2:35.60	$680
1897	Joe Miller	6	Tod Sloan	John R. Walker	Joseph E. Seagram	12 F	2:34.20	$1,150
1896	Deerslayer	4	Samuel Doggett	Walter C. Rollins	Walter C. Rollins	12 F	2:36.60	$1,150
1895	Bathampton	4	Fred Taral	Matthew Byrnes	Marcus Daly	12 F	2:35.00	$1,150
