= Islip Handicap =

- Class: Discontinued stakes
- Location: Brighton Beach Race Course, Brighton Beach, New York (1899–1909) Empire City Race Track in Yonkers, New York (1910)
- Inaugurated: 1899
- Race type: Thoroughbred – Flat racing

Race information
- Distance: 1 1/8 miles (9 furlongs)
- Surface: Dirt
- Track: Left-handed
- Qualification: Three-years-old & up

The Islip Handicap was an American Thoroughbred horse race held annually from 1899 through 1907 at New York's Brighton Beach Race Course and then for a final time in 1910 with a drastically reduced purse at Empire City Race Track in Yonkers, New York. A race for horses age three and older, it was contested on dirt over a distance of one mile for the first two runnings then at a mile and one-eighth for the remainder.

== Historical notes ==
The filly Imp won the 1899 inaugural running of the Islip Handicap. She would go on to earn recognition as that year's American Horse of the Year and induction into the U. S. Racing Hall of Fame in 1965.

In winning the 1902 edition, Bonnibert broke the Brighton Beach track record for the mile and one-eighth with a time of 1:51 flat.

== End of a race and of a racetrack ==
The Brighton Beach Race Course prospered until 1908 when the New York Legislature passed the Hart–Agnew Law banning gambling in New York State. Motor racing events were held at the facility in an attempt to keep the track from closing permanently but even after horse racing returned to New York it was too late to save the business.

At the time it ceased horse racing operations, the Brighton Beach Race Course was the oldest horse track in steady use in the New York City area.

== Records ==
Speed record:

- 1:51.00 @ 1 1/8 miles: Bonnibert (1902) (track record)

Most wins:

- No horse won this race more than once

Most wins by a jockey:

- No jockey won this race more than once

Most wins by a trainer:

- 2 – Thomas Welsh (1901, 1902)

Most wins by an owner:

- 2 – Charles Fleischman's Sons

== Winners ==
Year	Winner	Age	Jockey	Trainer	Owner	Dist. (Miles)	Time	Win $
1910	Restigouche	5	Carroll Shilling	Sam Hildreth	Sam Hildreth	1 1/8 mi	1:53.20	$925
1908	– 1909	Race not held due to the ramifications of the Hart–Agnew Law						
1907	Far West	5	Joe Notter	John Miller	Morton L. Schwartz	1 1/8 mi	1:53.00	$2,355
1906	Dishabille	4	Roscoe Troxler	Charles A. Mulholland	George C. Bennett	1 1/8 mi	1:54.00	$2,800
1905	Hermis	6	Arthur Redfern	Alexander Shields	Alexander Shields	1 1/8 mi	1:52.00	$2,525
1904	Dainty	4	Gene Hildebrand	Walter B. Jennings	Walter B. Jennings	1 1/8 mi	1:51.60	$2,845
1903	Golden Maxim	3	Harry Cochran	James J. McLaughlin	J. P. Kramer	1 1/8 mi	1:53.20	$2,445
1902	Bonnibert	4	Jack Martin	Thomas Welsh	Charles Fleischman's Sons	1 1/8 mi	1:51.00	$1,740
1901	Blues	3	Willie Shaw	Thomas Welsh	Charles Fleischman's Sons	1 1/8 mi	1:52.00	$2,170
1900	Ethelbert	4	Nash Turner	A. Jack Joyner	Perry Belmont	1 mi	1:40.00	$2,055
1899	Imp	5	Peter Clay	Charles E. Brossman	Daniel R. Harness	1 mi	1:40.60	$1,815
