= Hermis =

American Thoroughbred racehorse

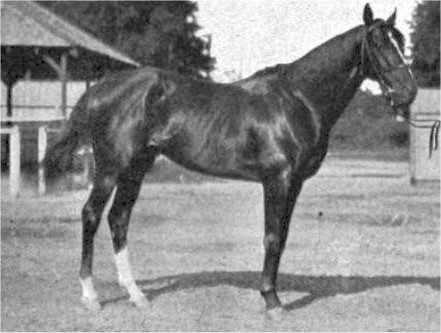
- Circa 1904.
- Sire: Hermence
- Grandsire: Isonomy
- Dam: Katy of the West
- Damsire: Spendthrift
- Sex: Stallion
- Foaled: 1899
- Country: United States
- Colour: Chestnut
- Breeder: Hiram Berry for H. A. Engman
- Owner: 2) Henry M. Ziegler; 3) Louis V. Bell; 4) Edward R. Thomas; 5) Alexander Shields
- Trainer: Charles Hughes; Jack McCormack; Alexander Shields (from 1903)
- Record: 56: 29-8-6
- Earnings: $84,155

Major wins
- First Special Stakes (1902); Travers Stakes (1902); Jerome Handicap (1902); Ocean View Handicap (1902); Saranac Handicap (1902); Brighton Cup (1903); Merchants and Citizens Handicap (1903); Edgemere Handicap (1903); Worshipper Handicap (1903); Ocean Handicap (1903); Cup Preliminary Stakes (1903); Brookdale Handicap (1904); Suburban Handicap (1904); Test Handicap (1904); Islip Handicap (1905)

Awards
- American Horse of the Year (1902, 1903); American Champion Three-Year-Old Male Horse (1902); American Champion Older Male Horse (1903, 1904)

Hermis (foaled 1899 in Kentucky) was an American Thoroughbred racehorse.

== Background ==
Hermis was a chestnut horse bred by Hiram Berry: H. A. Engman owned his dam, Katy of the West. He was purchased as a two-year-old by Cincinnati theatre man Henry M. Ziegler and was trained by Charles Hughes. Hermis would be sold to Louis V. Bell who turned him over to Jack McCormack to train. Sold in 1903 to banker Edward R. Thomas, Hermis would then be trained by Alexander Shields who later would acquire a part ownership and then full ownership in 1906.

== Racing career ==
Beginning at age three, Hermis was a dominant force in racing and would be awarded 1902 American Champion Three-Year-Old Male Horse and American Horse of the Year honors. At age four he was the 1903 American Champion Older Male Horse and repeated as American Horse of the Year. At his final race during the 1904 World's Fair Handicap in St. Louis, Hermis received an injury to his leg due to being kicked by 1903 Kentucky Derby winner Judge Himes during the start. As a result of the injury, Hermis never raced again. However, for 1904 Hermis was again selected as the American Champion Older Male Horse. At the time such Champion designations were espoused by various racing media but these designated honors were selected retrospectively by a panel of experts as published by The Blood-Horse magazine.

== Stud record ==
Hermis was retired to stud duty. On January 3, 1912, the New York Times reported that he had been sold to Edmond Blanc, a prominent French breeder and owner of Haras de Jardy at Marnes-la-Coquette in what is today the western suburbs of Paris.
