= Sapphire Stakes (United States) =

- Class: Discontinued stakes
- Location: Sheepshead Bay Race Track, Sheepshead Bay, Brooklyn, New York, United States
- Inaugurated: 1887
- Race type: Thoroughbred – Flat racing

Race information
- Distance: 5.5 furlongs
- Surface: Dirt
- Track: left-handed
- Qualification: Two years old

The Sapphire Stakes was an American Thoroughbred horse race run from 1887 through 1909 at Sheepshead Bay Race Track in Sheepshead Bay, Brooklyn, New York. A race for two-year-old horses of either sex, it was run on dirt over a distance of five and one-half furlongs.

== Historical notes ==
The inaugural running of the Sapphire Stakes took which took place on September 1, 1887 was won by Geraldine. Owned by Porter Ashe, ridden by Mike Kelly, and trained by Matthew Allen, Geraldine was described in a 1907 Daily Racing Form article as "one of the fastest sprinters of American turf history." After another two years of racing, the same publication expanded their assessment of Geraldine to "one of the fleetest mares that ever raced in this country."

Lady Navarre won the 1905 Sapphire Stakes and as a three-year-old continued to take on her male counterparts, winning the Tennessee Derby and finishing second to Sir Huon in the 1906 Kentucky Derby.

== The End of a Race and of a Racetrack ==
Passage of the Hart–Agnew anti-betting legislation by the New York Legislature under Republican Governor Charles Evans Hughes led to a compete shutdown of racing in 1911 and 1912 in the state. A February 21, 1913 ruling by the New York Supreme Court, Appellate Division saw horse racing return in 1913. However, it was too late for the Sheepshead Bay horse racing facility and it never reopened.

== Records ==
Speed record:

- 1:06 1/5 @ 5.5 furlongs : Agile (1904)

Most wins by a jockey:

- 3 – Eddie Dugan (1907, 1908, 1909)
- 3 – Tommy Burns (1901, 1904, 1905)

Most wins by a trainer:

- 5 – James G. Rowe Sr. (1889, 1892, 1897, 1900, 1902)

Most wins by an owner:

- 2 – John E. Madden (1899, 1907)
- 2 – James R. Keene (1900, 1902)

== Winners ==
| Year | Winner | Age | Jockey | Trainer | Owner | Dist. (Furlongs) | Time | Win$ |
|---|---|---|---|---|---|---|---|---|
| 1909 | Pretend | 2 | Eddie Dugan | Thomas Welsh | Thomas Monahan | 5.5 F | 1:07.20 | $1,050 |
| 1908 | Perseus | 2 | Eddie Dugan | A. Jack Joyner | Harry Payne Whitney | 5.5 F | 1:06.40 | $1,050 |
| 1907 | Meelick | 2 | Eddie Dugan | John E. Madden | John E. Madden | 5.5 F | 1:06.60 | $3,025 |
| 1906 | W. H. Daniel | 2 | Joshua Jones | Henry E. McDaniel | Edmund S. Burke Jr. | 5.5 F | 1:06.60 | $3,175 |
| 1905 | Lady Navarre | 2 | Tommy Burns | George P. Brazier | Charles R. Ellison | 5.5 F | 1:09.00 | $3,625 |
| 1904 | Agile | 2 | Tommy Burns | Robert Tucker | Samuel S. Brown | 5.5 F | 1:06.20 | $3,425 |
| 1903 | Luxembourg | 2 | Gray | Anthony L. Aste | Anthony L. Aste | 5.5 F | 1:07.00 | $2,710 |
| 1902 | Clarion | 2 | Winfield O'Connor | James G. Rowe Sr. | James R. Keene | 5.5 F | 1:06.40 | $3,170 |
| 1901 | Pretorius | 2 | Tommy Burns | John W. Rogers | William Collins Whitney | 5.5 F | 1:08.00 | $2,470 |
| 1900 | Conroy | 2 | Henry Spencer | James G. Rowe Sr. | James R. & Foxhall P. Keene | 5.5 F | 1:06.60 | $2,250 |
| 1899 | Gulden | 2 | George M. Odom | John E. Madden | John E. Madden | 5.5 F | 1:08.40 | $2,440 |
| 1898 | Ways and Means | 2 | Danny Maher | Byron McClelland | Mrs. Byron McClelland | 5.5 F | 1:10.00 | $1,990 |
| 1897 | The Huguenot | 2 | Willie Martin | James G. Rowe Sr. | William P. Thompson & Lewis S. Thompson | 5.5 F | 1:08.00 | $1,430 |
| 1896 | The Friar † | 2 | Fred Littlefield | R. Wyndham Walden | Alfred H. & Dave H. Morris | 5.5 F | 1:07.80 | $1,425 |
| 1895 | Kamsin | 2 | Henry Griffin | Louis H. Ezell | Louis H. Ezell | 5.5 F | 1:08.40 | $1,630 |
| 1894 | Dolabra | 2 | Anthony Hamilton | John Huggins | Pierre Lorillard IV | 5.5 F | 1:08.40 | $2,010 |
| 1893 | Longdale | 2 | John Lamley | John S. Campbell | Jacob Ruppert Jr. | 5.5 F | 1:08.80 | $1,725 |
| 1892 | Bellegarde | 2 | Willie Simms | James G. Rowe Sr. | Blemton Stable | 5.5 F | 1:09.00 | $1,935 |
| 1891 | King Cadmus | 2 | Fred Taral | William C. Smith | George E. Smith | 5.5 F | 1:09.40 | $2,030 |
| 1890 | Gascon | 2 | Monk Overton | John H. Morris | Bashford Manor Stable | 5.5 F | 1:10.00 | $2,370 |
| 1889 | Magnate | 2 | George Anderson | James G. Rowe Sr. | August Belmont Sr. | 5.5 F | 1:09.20 | $2,415 |
| 1888 | Sluggard | 2 | George Taylor | Barney Riley | David D. Withers | 6 F | 1:14.40 | $1,805 |
| 1887 | Geraldine | 2 | Mike Kelly | Matthew M.Allen | Maltese Villa Stable (R. Porter Ashe) | 6 F | 1:15.00 | $2,000 |

- † George Rose finished first in the 1896 running but was disqualified.
