= Agile (horse) =

American-bred Thoroughbred racehorse

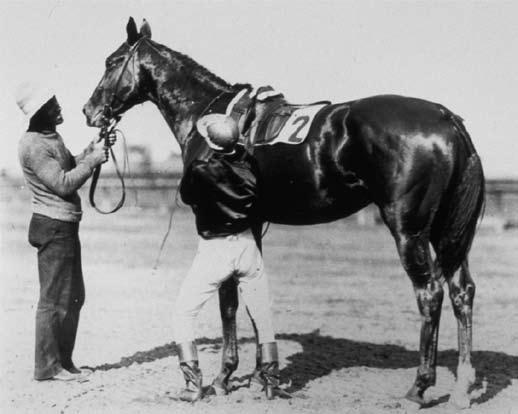
- 1905 Kentucky Derby winner Agile
- Sire: Sir Dixon
- Grandsire: Billet
- Dam: Alpena
- Damsire: King Alfonso
- Sex: Stallion
- Foaled: 1902
- Country: United States
- Color: Bay
- Breeder: Runnymede Farm (Ezekiel F. Clay)
- Owner: 1) Samuel S. Brown; 2) Frank E. Brown
- Trainer: Robert Tucker
- Record: 66: 14-12-9
- Earnings: $39,800

Major wins
- Sapphire Stakes (1904); Waldorf Stakes (1904); Advance Stakes (1905); Phoenix Stakes (1905); Tennessee Derby (1905) American Classics wins: Kentucky Derby (1905)

Agile (1902–after 1914) was an American Thoroughbred racehorse who won the 1905 Kentucky Derby.

== Background ==
Agile was sired by Sir Dixon, a good runner whose wins included the Belmont, Travers and Withers Stakes and who was the Leading sire in North America in 1901. In addition to Agile, Sir Dixon was also the sire of Champions Running Water and Blue Girl as well as the multiple top level stakes winner and track record breaker, Blues.

Agile was bred at Runnymede by Colonel Ezekiel Clay. His first owner was Captain Samuel S. Brown, and he was trained by Bob Tucker.

== Racing career ==
Ridden by Jack Martin, Agile won the 1905 Kentucky Derby against two other competitors, Ram's Horn and Layson. It was one of the smallest fields since Azra won in 1892.

Following the death of Captain Samuel Brown, his son Frank bought Agile for $5,700 in the July 1906 dispersal sale of the entire racing stable. The last record of Agile racing was coming last in a claiming race at Aqueduct Racetrack in November 1907.

== Stud career ==
Agile sired three registered Thoroughbred offspring out of Texas-bred mares; the fillies Lady Eloise (1913), Chancy M (1915), and Katie Strand (1913). Lady Eloise is the third dam of American Quarter Horse champion Woven Web, a sibling of the Texas-bred Triple Crown winner Assault.

In 1912, Agile was owned by T. Polk of San Antonio and was used as a carriage horse by the family.

== Pedigree ==
Pedigree of Agile, bay stallion, 1902
Sire Sir Dixon	Billet	Voltigeur	Voltaire
Sire Sir Dixon	Billet	Voltigeur	Martha Lynn
Sire Sir Dixon	Billet	Calcutta	Flatcatcher
Sire Sir Dixon	Billet	Calcutta	Miss Martin
Sire Sir Dixon	Jaconet	Leamington	Faugh-a-Ballagh
Sire Sir Dixon	Jaconet	Leamington	Pantaloon mare
Sire Sir Dixon	Jaconet	Maggie B B	Australian
Sire Sir Dixon	Jaconet	Maggie B B	Madeline
Dam Alpena	King Alfonso	Phaeton	King Tom
Dam Alpena	King Alfonso	Phaeton	Merry Sunshine
Dam Alpena	King Alfonso	Capitola	Vandal
Dam Alpena	King Alfonso	Capitola	Margrave mare
Dam Alpena	Penumbra	Pat Malloy	Lexington
Dam Alpena	Penumbra	Pat Malloy	Gloriana
Dam Alpena	Penumbra	Penelope	Commodore
Dam Alpena	Penumbra	Penelope	Penola (family: 24)
