= Daniel A. Maher =

American jockey (1881–1916)

Danny Maher
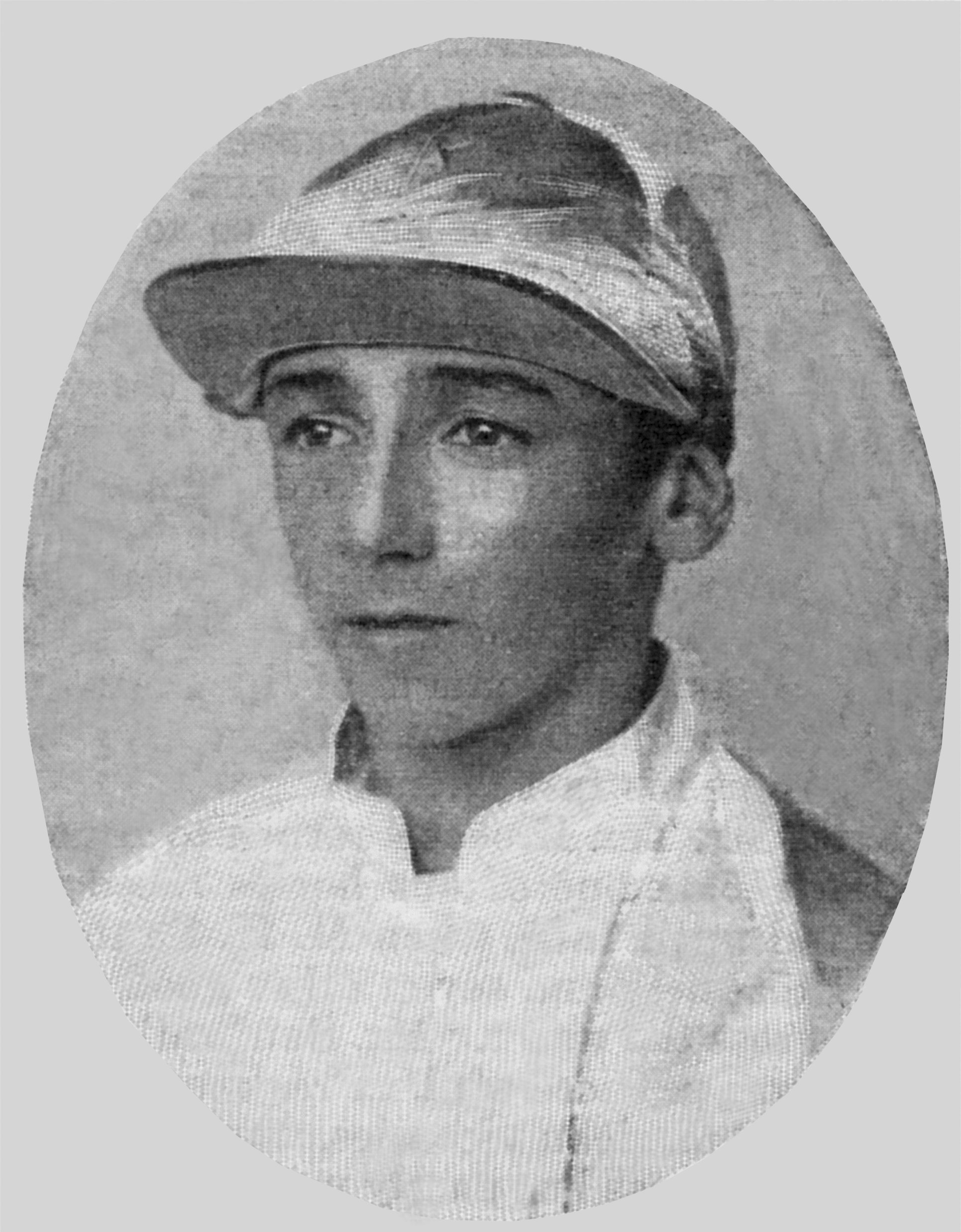
- Circa 1900

Personal information
- Born: October 29, 1881 Hartford, Connecticut, U.S.
- Died: November 9, 1916 (aged 35) London, England
- Occupation: Jockey

Horse racing career
- Sport: Horse racing
- Career wins: USA: 1,771; Britain: 1,421

Major racing wins
- In the United States: Dash Stakes (1897, 1898, 1900); Champagne Stakes (1898); Flatbush Stakes (1898); First Special Stakes (1898); Flying Handicap (1898); Junior Champion Stakes (1898); Ocean Handicap (1898); Sapphire Stakes (1898); September Stakes (1898); Test Handicap (1898, 1899); Winged Foot Handicap (1898); Brooklyn Handicap (1899); Gazelle Handicap (1899); Eclipse Stakes (1899, 1900); Seagate Stakes (1899); Toboggan Handicap (1899); Tremont Stakes (1899,1900); Belles Stakes (1900); Carter Handicap (1900); Golden Rod Stakes (1900); Ladies Handicap (1900); Metropolitan Handicap (1900) In the United Kingdom: Chester Cup (1901); Doncaster Cup (1901, 1903, 1906); Imperial Produce Stakes (1901); Gimcrack Stakes (1902); Eclipse Stakes (1902, 1904, 1906, 1909, 1910); Ascot Gold Cup (1906, 1910); Cambridgeshire Handicap (1906); King's Gold Vase (1907); Prince of Wales's Stakes (1907); Richmond Stakes (1908); Middle Park Plate (1908); Dewhurst Plate (1908); Champion Stakes (1909); St. James's Palace Stakes (1912) British Classic Race wins: 1,000 Guineas (1901); St. Leger Stakes (1903, 1909); Epsom Derby (1903, 1905, 1906); Epsom Oaks (1906); 2,000 Guineas (1910, 1912)

Racing awards
- British flat racing Champion Jockey (1908, 1913)

Honours
- United States' Racing Hall of Fame (1955)

Significant horses
- Rock Sand, Cicero, Spearmint, Bayardo, Tracery, Pretty Polly, Ard Patrick, Polymelus
- Updated on May 9, 2007

Daniel Aloysius Maher (October 29, 1881 – November 9, 1916) was an American Hall of Fame jockey who also became a Champion jockey in Great Britain.

== U.S. riding career ==
Daniel Aloysius "Danny" Maher commenced his career at the age of 14, weighing 65 pounds. He served his apprenticeship under Bill Daly, a well-known developer of jockey talent. Three years later, in 1898, he topped America's jockey's list. Maher was best known in the United States for winning the Metropolitan Handicap on Ethelbert (1900), the Brooklyn Handicap and Toboggan Handicap on Banaster (1899), the Champagne Stakes on Lothario (1898), and the Ladies Handicap on Oneck Queen (1900). Maher was America's leading jockey in 1898.

The Hart–Agnew Law anti-gambling legislation forced Maher and numerous other jockeys and trainers to leave America for Europe where they quickly made a mark on European racing.

== English riding career ==
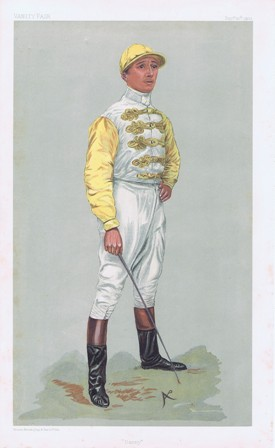
Maher caricatured by Ao for Vanity Fair, 1903

In England, Maher won 1,421 races with 25 percent of his mounts. He won his first English Classic on Aida in the 1901 1,000 Guineas and later that year won the Chester Cup on the colt David Garrick, owned by American Pierre Lorillard IV. In 1903, Maher won two-thirds of England's Triple Crown with Rock Sand. He also won The Derby three times (1903, 1905, 1906), five Eclipse Stakes (1902, 1904, 1906, 1909, 1910), and was a two-time winner of the Ascot Gold Cup (1906, 1909). In 1907 Maher's wins included the King's Gold Vase.

Maher was Britain's leading jockey in 1908 and 1913, the year he obtained British citizenship.

Maher died in 1916, at the age of 35, of consumption. He is buried in Paddington Cemetery, Mill Hill, London, England.

== Posthumous ==
In 1955, Maher was one of the inaugural inductees in the United States' Racing Hall of Fame. In 1999, the Racing Post ranked Maher as third in their list of the Top 50 jockeys of the 20th century.

== Career at a glance ==
U.S. riding career: 1895–1900
Number of Mounts: 6,781
Number of Winners: 1,771
Winning percentage: 26.1 percent

British riding career: 1900–1915
Number of Mounts: 5,684 est.
Number of Winners: 1,421
Winning percentage: 25 percent

== External sources ==
- Eclipse Stakes winners
