= William M. Odom =

American academic (c.1885–1942)

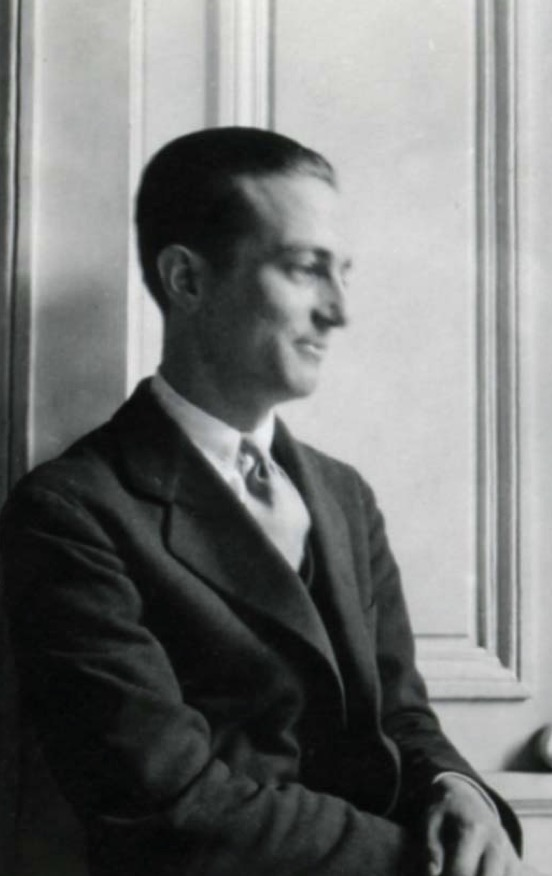
- Assumed portrait of Odom, taken between 1925 and 1927
- Born: William Macdougall Odom c. 1885; Columbus, Georgia, US
- Died: January 29, 1942 (aged 57); Manhattan, New York City, US
- Education: Parsons School of Design
- Occupation: Academic
- Relatives: George M. Odom (brother)
- Honours: Legion of Honour

William Macdougall Odom (c. 1885 – January 29, 1942) was an American academic of interior design. He served as president of the Parsons School of Design.

== Biography ==
Odom was born c. 1885, in Columbus, Georgia, to stable master John David Odom and his wife, Maria Carughic Odom. His brother was jockey George M. Odom. He travelled to New York City to study music, but illness caused him to swap to interior design. In 1909, he graduated from the Parsons School of Design, and using a two-year scholarship, also studied at schools in England, France, and Italy.

Odom began teaching interior design at Parsons in September 1911, and in 1912, was appointed head of Parsons' interior design department, then in 1930, was appointed president of the school. Under his tenure, the school was renamed to Parsons, from the former New York School of Fine and Applied Art. He was succeeded by Van Day Truex in 1942. He established Parsons classes in Paris and Italy. Labelled "an international authority on interior architecture and decoration", he authored newspaper articles and pamphlets, as well as the two-volume A History of Italian Furniture. On December 27, 1927, he was awarded the Legion of Honour, for his research on French art.

Odom maintained a close relationship with Frank Alvah Parsons, with him receiving Parsons' estate and copyright holdings in his will. Odom owned houses in France, England, and New York City. He died on January 29, 1942, aged 57, in the Ritz Tower of Manhattan, from illness.
