= Robert Tucker (horse trainer) =

Personal information
- Born: March 24, 1857 Frankfort, Kentucky, U.S.
- Died: March 24, 1910 (aged 53) Louisville, Kentucky, U.S.
- Resting place: St. Louis Cemetery; Louisville, Kentucky
- Occupation: Trainer

Horse racing career
- Sport: Horse racing

Major racing wins
- Juvenile Stakes (1893,1894); Latonia Derby (1893, 1901); Montgomery Handicap (1893); Brookdale Handicap (1896); Parkway Handicap (1896); Sheepshead Bay Handicap (1896); Belles Stakes (1902); Kentucky Oaks (1904); Waldorf Stakes (1904); Youngster Stakes (1904); Brighton Handicap (1904); Flying Handicap (1904); Manhattan Handicap (1904); Sapphire Stakes (1904); Tennessee Derby (1904, 1905); Travers Stakes (1904); Undergraduate Stakes (1904); Advance Stakes (1905); Phoenix Stakes (1905); Brighton Junior Stakes (1905); Montauk Stakes (1905); Withers Stakes (1906) American Classics wins: Kentucky Derby (1905)

Significant horses
- Accountant, Agile, Broomstick, St. Maxim

Robert Tucker (March 24, 1857 - March 24, 1910) was a trainer of Thoroughbred racehorses best known for winning the 1905 Kentucky Derby and the Tennessee Derby with the colt Agile for owner Samuel S. Brown.

Among his other clients, Robert Tucker trained for Charles Fleischmann, founder of Fleischmann Yeast Company.

Robert Tucker died of heart failure in Louisville, Kentucky on his fifty-third birthday and was buried in Louisville's St. Louis Cemetery.
