= 1905 Kentucky Derby =

Horse race

31st Kentucky Derby
- Kentucky Derby
- Grade I stakes race
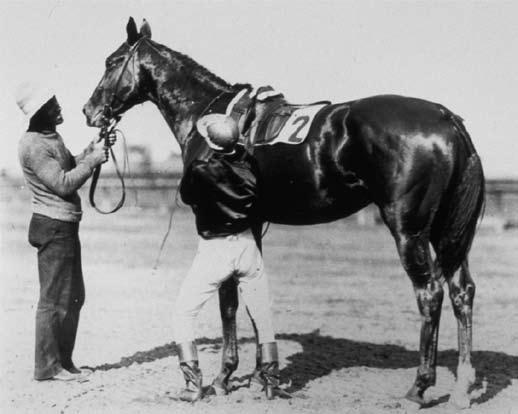
- 1905 Kentucky Derby winner Agile
- Location: Churchill Downs
- Date: May 10, 1905
- Winning horse: Agile
- Jockey: Jack Martin
- Trainer: Robert Tucker
- Owner: Samuel S. Brown
- Surface: Dirt

The 1905 Kentucky Derby was the 31st running of the Kentucky Derby. The race took place on May 10, 1905. The field was reduced to only three competitors when Dr. Leggo and McClellan scratched.

== Full results ==
| Finished | Post | Horse | Jockey | Trainer | Owner | Time / behind |
|---|---|---|---|---|---|---|
| 1st | | Agile | Jack Martin | Robert Tucker | Samuel S. Brown | 2:10.75 |
| 2nd | | Ram's Horn | Lucien Lyne | W. S. "Wink" Williams | W. S. Williams & Co. | 3 |
| 3rd | | Layson | Dale Austin | Thomas P. Hayes | Thomas P. Hayes | 20 |

- Winning Breeder: Runnymede Farm (Ezekiel F. Clay); (KY)

== Payout ==
- The winner received a purse of $4,850.
- Second place received $700.
- Third place received $300.
