= William P. Burch =

William Burch
Personal information
- Born: c. 1846 Cheraw, South Carolina, United States
- Died: July 9, 1926
- Resting place: Oak Hill Cemetery
- Occupation: Trainer / Owner

Horse racing career
- Sport: Horse racing
- Career wins: Not found

Major racing wins
- Monmouth Sequel Stakes (1872); Saratoga Sequel Stakes (1872); Spinaway Stakes (1885); Withers Stakes (1886); Russet Stakes (1898); Pansy Stakes (1899, 1902); Matron Stakes (1902); Grand Union Hotel Stakes (1902); Uncas Handicap (1923); Maryland Handicap (1923); Saratoga Handicap (1924)

Honours
- United States' Racing Hall of Fame (1963); W. P. Burch Memorial Handicap (Bowie Race Track)

Significant horses
- Biggonet, My Own

William Preston Burch (c. 1846 – July 9, 1926) was an American Thoroughbred horse racing Hall of Fame trainer. A native of South Carolina, William Burch served as a courier in the Confederate States Army under Lieut. Gen. Wade Hampton III during the American Civil War. At war's end he became involved in the racing of American Quarter Horses at various fairgrounds in the Southern United States. In 1866 he embarked on a career as a professional trainer in Thoroughbred horse racing which led him to work at racetracks along the northeastern seaboard where for many years he owned, trained and raced horses for himself. Among those were Biggonet, who won important races at New York tracks including the 1885 Spinaway Stakes at Saratoga Race Course and the 1886 Withers Stakes at Jerome Park Racetrack. Beginning in the early 1890s Burch conditioned horses for owners such as Francis Hitchcock, Samuel Ross, and Admiral Cary Grayson.

While preparing horses for owners Cary Grayson and Samuel Ross at Saratoga Springs, New York in July 1926, eighty-year-old William Burch fell ill and was admitted to a private hospital where he died on July 9.

Following its formation, in 1955 William P. Burch was inducted in the National Museum of Racing and Hall of Fame. Sons Selby and Preston both became trainers as did grandson Elliott Burch and great-grandson, William E. Burch. Preston and his son Elliott were both inducted in the U.S. Racing Hall of Fame. In addition to members of his own family, William Burch was responsible for bringing future Hall of Fame inductees George Odom and Jack Joyner into Thoroughbred racing.

Burch was buried in Oak Hill Cemetery in Washington, D.C.
