= Tennessee Derby =

- Class: Discontinued stakes
- Location: Memphis Fairgrounds; Memphis, Tennessee, United States
- Inaugurated: 1884
- Race type: Thoroughbred - Flat racing

Race information
- Distance: 1 1/2 miles (1884–1886), 1 1/8 miles (1890–1906)
- Surface: Dirt
- Qualification: Three-year-olds
- Weight: Colts, 122 lbs.; Geldings, 119; Fillies, 117 (1905 conditions)
- Purse: Variable ($625–9,440)

The Tennessee Derby is a discontinued American Thoroughbred horse race that was run annually from 1884 to 1886 and then 1890–1906 at the Montgomery Park Race Track located on the Memphis Fairgrounds in Tennessee. The Tennessee Derby rivaled the Kentucky Derby at the time for prestige and purse money, but was not reinstated after a gambling ban took effect in 1907. Kentucky Derby winners Joe Cotton and Agile also won the Tennessee Derby.

The final edition of the Tennessee Derby was run on April 24, 1906, and was won by Lady Navarre.

== Records ==
Speed record: (at 1-1/8 miles)

- 1:55.75 - Berclair (1896)

Most wins by a jockey:

- 2 - Nash Turner (1886, 1899)
- 2 - Tommy Britton (1891, 1892)
- 2 - Tommy Burns (1898, 1906)

Most wins by an owner:

- 2 - Hiram J. Scoggan (1891, 1900)
- 2 - Dr. Edwin F. McLean (1894, 1896)
- 2 - Samuel S. Brown (1904, 1905)

== Winners ==
| Year | Winner | Jockey | Trainer | Owner | Dist. (Miles) | Time | Win$ |
|---|---|---|---|---|---|---|---|
| 1906 | Lady Navarre | Tommy Burns | George P. Brazier | Charles R. Ellison | 11/8 M | 1:56.25 | $9,440 |
| 1905 | Agile | Jack Martin | Robert Tucker | Samuel S. Brown | 11/8 M | 1:58.00 | $8,885 |
| 1904 | Proceeds | Arthur Helgesen | Robert Tucker | Samuel S. Brown | 11/8 M | 2:02.50 | $4,730 |
| 1903 | Claude | J. Daly | Michael J. Daly | Michael J. Daly | 11/8 M | 1:58.50 | $5,625 |
| 1902 | Abe Frank | Willie Coburn | Henry McDaniel | George C. Bennett | 11/8 M | 1:57.50 | $4,550 |
| 1901 | Royal Victor | James Winkfield | Thomas P. Hayes | Thomas P. Hayes | 11/8 M | 1:57.00 | $5,360 |
| 1900 | Florizar | Clyde Van Dusen | Hiram J. Scoggan | Hiram J. Scoggan | 11/8 M | 2:00.00 | $4,895 |
| 1899 | May Hempstead | Nash Turner | H. Eugene Leigh | Hal Pettit Headley & W. P. Norton | 11/8 M | 1:57.75 | $6,260 |
| 1898 | Lieber Karl | Tommy Burns | George Walker | John W. Schorr | 11/8 M | 1:57.75 | $4,120 |
| 1897 | Buckvidere | Robert "Tiny" Williams | Julius C. Cahn | Abe Cahn | 11/8 M | 1:56.25 | $4,125 |
| 1896 | Berclair | Charles A. Thorpe | Tom Blackburn | Dr. Edwin F. McLean | 11/8 M | 1:55.75 | $4,125 |
| 1895 | Fandango | Willie Martin | William McDaniel | John W. Orth | 11/8 M | 1:59.25 | $3,950 |
| 1894 | Jamboree | J. Davis | | Dr. Edwin F. McLean | 11/8 M | 2:09.25 | $4,125 |
| 1893 | Calhoun | Eddie Kunze | William McDaniel | John E. Cushing & John W. Orth | 11/8 M | 2:04.50 | $2,490 |
| 1892 | Tom Elliott | Tommy Britton | | J. M. Brown | 11/8 M | 2:03.75 | $1,940 |
| 1891 | Vallera | Tommy Britton | Enoch Wishard | Scoggin Bros. (Hiram J., George W., John) | 11/8 M | 2:00.00 | $2,090 |
| 1890 | Robespierre | S. Francis | H. Eugene Leigh | George V. Hankins | 11/8 M | 2:00.00 | $1,790 |
| 1887 | 1889 | Race not held | | | | | |
| 1886 | Jim Gray | Nash Turner | John S. Campbell | Gray & Co. | 11/2 M | 2:44.00 | $755 |
| 1885 | Joe Cotton | Erskine Henderson | Abraham Perry | James T. Williams | 11/2 M | 2:42.75 | $800 |
| 1884 | Ten Strike | Yetman | Walter B. Jennings | Walter B. Jennings | 11/2 M | 2:48.25 | $625 |
