= Imp (horse) =

American-bred Thoroughbred racehorse

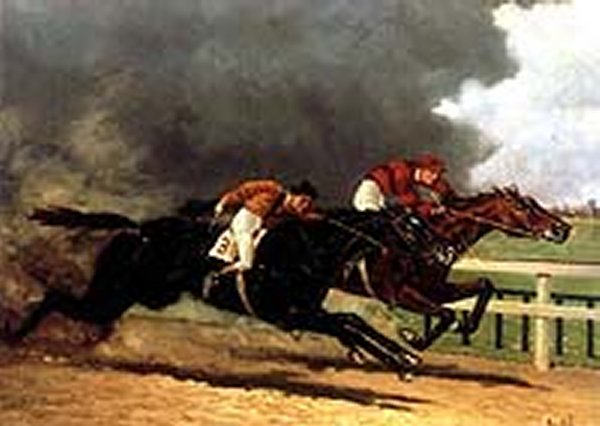
- Imp (foreground) running with Ethelbert in the 1900 Brighton Cup as painted by Henry Stull.
- Sire: Wagner
- Grandsire: Prince Charlie
- Dam: Fondling
- Damsire: Fonso
- Sex: Filly
- Foaled: March 5, 1894
- Country: United States
- Color: Black
- Breeder: Daniel R. Harness
- Owner: 1. Daniel R. Harness; 2. John E. Madden
- Trainer: Charles E. Brossman & Peter Wimmer
- Record: 171: 62-35-29
- Earnings: $70,069

Major wins
- Austin Stakes (1898); Memorial Day Handicap (1898); Monadnock Stakes (1898); Brighton Handicap (1899); First Special Stakes (1899); Islip Handicap (1899); Ocean Handicap (1899); Oriental Handicap (1899); Second Special Stakes (1899, 1900); Suburban Handicap (1899); Turf Handicap (1899); Advance Stakes (1900); Mahopac Handicap (1900); Parkway Handicap (1900)

Awards
- United States Horse of the Year (1899); U.S. Champion Female Handicap Horse (1899, 1900)

Honors
- United States Racing Hall of Fame (1965)
- Last updated on July 14, 2017

Imp (1894–1909) was a pure black Thoroughbred racing filly with a white, diamond-shaped star between her eyes. She was sired by Wagner (GB) out of Fondling (by Fonso) and was foaled on March 5, 1894. Owned and bred by Daniel R. Harness of Chillicothe, Ohio, and trained by both Charles E. Brossman and Peter Wimmer (when she was seven), Imp's male line of descent was the great Eclipse. Imp, nicknamed "My Coal Black Lady" after a popular song of the day, was a bit of a homely-looking thing, the daughter of parents who each raced only once. Her sire won the Wilton Park Stakes in England but her dam was injured in her only start.

== Racing record ==
Imp, who began racing in Ohio and Kentucky, started out inauspiciously, winning three of eleven starts as a two-year-old. But by her second season she became the talk of the racing world by making fifty starts. She won only 14 of them, but was in the money 33 times. In her fourth season she was shipped to New York to challenge the big-name horses in the Suburban Handicap. She lost that first time, but returned the following year, 1899, and took the race. She was the first mare to ever win the $10,000 Suburban. All in all, Imp started in a grueling 171 races, coming in the money in 126 of them. She won 62 times, placed 35 times, and came in third 29 times. A sprinter as well as a stayer, My Coal Black Lady defeated the best males of her times. She also won the Brighton Handicap while giving nine pounds to champion Ethelbert. At six, she won the Advance Stakes by 30 lengths and set an American record for 1¾ miles.

Ridden in many of her races by future Hall of Fame jockey, Nash Turner, Imp's best races included:

- Firsts: Memorial Day Handicap, Monadnock Stakes, Austin Stakes, Speed Stakes, Hawthorne Dash Stakes, Suburban Handicap, Brighton Handicap, Islip Handicap, Ocean Handicap, Turf Handicap, Oriental Handicap, Special Handicap (which she won three times), Parkway Handicap, Advance Stakes (by 30 lengths), and the Mahopac Handicap.
- Places: New Rochelle Handicap, Coney Island Handicap, Brookdale Handicap, Long Island Handicap, Brighton Cup, Municipal Handicap, Empire City Handicap, and the Idlewild Handicap.
- Shows: Sapphire Stakes, Oakwood Handicap, Claremont High-weight Handicap, Long Island Handicap, Fall Handiap, 1st Bennings Spring Handicap, 2nd Bennings Spring Handicap, Metropolitan Handicap, Sheepshead Bay Handicap, Brighton Handicap, Islip Handicap, and the Saratoga Cup.

When Imp returned to Chillicothe, Ohio for a visit, there was a band and a parade. The town declared it a public holiday. Of course the band played My Coal Black Lady.

== Broodmare record ==
When Harness died in 1902, she was sold to John E. Madden. She produced five foals under his care, among them the stakes winner Faust and the winning colt Devilkin.

Extremely popular in the Gay Nineties, she retired at seven years of age, having set records at 1 1/16, 1¼, 1½ and 1¾ mile.

Imp won the U.S. Horse of the Year honors in 1899, as well as the U.S. Champion Handicap Mare, the same year Admiration (b. 1896) by Kingston out of Hypocrite by Longfellow was three-year-old filly champion. She repeated as Champion Handicap Mare in 1900. Her life earnings amounted to $70,069.

== Death ==
She died in 1909 and was buried at Hamburg Place, Lexington, Kentucky. (See external links for Walmart's treatment of her burial site.)

== Legacy ==
More than five decades after her death, Imp was inducted into the National Museum of Racing and Hall of Fame in Saratoga Springs, New York in 1965.

In a poll among members of the American Trainers Association, conducted in 1955 by Delaware Park Racetrack, Imp was voted the tenth greatest filly in American racing history. Gallorette was voted first.
