= George M. Odom =

George Odom
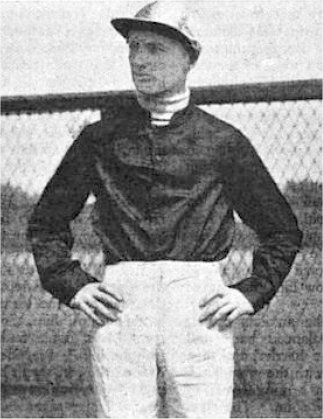
- Odom, c. 1903

Personal information
- Born: July 8, 1882 Columbus, Georgia, US
- Died: July 29, 1964 (aged 82)
- Occupation: Trainer

Horse racing career
- Sport: Horse racing
- Career wins: 527 (as a jockey)

Major racing wins
- As a jockey: Champagne Stakes (1899, 1904); Jerome Handicap (1899); National Stallion Stakes (1899); Pansy Stakes (1899); Sapphire Stakes (1899); Advance Stakes (1900, 1902, 1903); Laureate Stakes (1900, 1903); Municipal Handicap (1900, 1902, 1903); September Stakes (1900, 1902); Gazelle Handicap (1901); Matron Stakes (1901, 1902); Metropolitan Handicap (1901); Toboggan Handicap (1901, 1904); Tremont Stakes (1901); Annual Champion Stakes (1902); Brighton Derby (1902); Brighton Handicap (1902, 1903); Champlain Handicap (1902, 1904); First Special Stakes (1902); Hudson Stakes (1902); Lawrence Realization Stakes (1902); Surf Stakes (1902); Double Event Stakes (part 2) (1903); Eclipse Stakes (1903); Flying Handicap (1903); Great American Stakes (1903); Juvenile Stakes (1903); Occidental Handicap (1903); Ocean Handicap (1903); Saratoga Handicap (1903); Test Handicap (1903); Russet Stakes (1904); Withers Stakes (1904); Fashion Stakes (1905) American Classic Race wins: Belmont Stakes (1904) As a trainer: Walden Stakes (1908); Flying Handicap (1909); Russet Stakes (1909); Mount Vernon Handicap (1917); Tremont Stakes (1918, 1937); Test Stakes (1922, 1941); Hudson Stakes (1925); Huron Handicap (1925); Champlain Handicap (1926); Empire City Handicap (1926, 1927); Toboggan Handicap (1926); Southampton Handicap (1927); Belmont Futurity Stakes (1928, 1935); Metropolitan Handicap (1928); Youthful Stakes (1928); Manhattan Handicap (1929, 1949); Pierrepont Handicap (1930); Fleetwing Handicap (1936); Juvenile Stakes (1937); Tremont Stakes (1937); Daingerfield Handicap (1941); Saranac Handicap (1942); Arlington Handicap (1945); Hollywood Derby (1945); San Pasqual Handicap (1945); San Vicente Stakes (1945); Santa Anita Handicap (1945); Santa Anita Oaks (1945); National Stallion Stakes (1951); United States Hotel Stakes (1951); Santa Margarita Handicap (1945); Washington Park Handicap (1945); Great American Stakes (1946); Travers Stakes (1947); Arlington-Washington Lassie Stakes (1957); Fashion Stakes (1957); National Stallion Stakes (filly division) (1957); Schuylerville Stakes (1957) American Classic Race wins: Belmont Stakes (1938)

Honors
- National Museum of Racing and Hall of Fame (1955)

Significant horses
- As a jockey: Africander, Banastar, Broomstick, Delhi, Ethelbert, Gold Heels, Imp As a trainer: Busher, Chance Play, Nimba, Pasteurized, Tippity Witchet

George Martin Odom (July 8, 1882 – July 29, 1964) was an American National Museum of Racing and Hall of Fame jockey and trainer in Thoroughbred horse racing. He is only one of two people to ever have won the Belmont Stakes as both a jockey and a trainer.

Odom was a native of Columbus, Georgia, and his brother was academic William M. Odom. At age fourteen, he galloped horses for future Hall of Fame trainer, William P. Burch. He began riding professionally at age fifteen and in 1899 at age sixteen, won his first race. He quickly made such an impression that an April 10, 1899, article in the Chicago Daily Tribune referred to him as another Tod Sloan. In June 1899, the eighty-seven-pound Odom, who was an early advocate of the short-stirrup riding manner used today, signed a contract to ride for W. C. Whitney for a salary of $10,000 a year with additional compensation on a sliding scale for winning and finishing in the money.

He rode at tracks in New York, New Orleans and the Benning Race Track in Washington, D.C. Among his major wins as a jockey, Odom rode Banastar to victory in the 1901 Metropolitan and Toboggan Handicaps. The best known of his mounts was future Hall of Fame inductee, Broomstick.

After just eight years as a jockey, George Odom retired from riding in 1905 with a 17.2 winning percentage. Widely respected, he had earned a reputation as an honest jockey in an era when race fixing was not uncommon. Odom then made his home in Atlanta, Georgia, and immediately turned to training horses.

== As a trainer ==
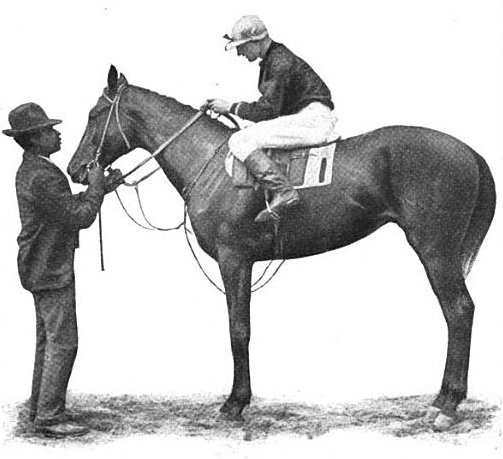
Broomstick with George Odom up, c. 1903

George Odom made his debut as a trainer on August 30, 1906, at Sheepshead Bay Race Track in Brooklyn, New York. He owned and trained a colt name Oraculum, who won the 1906 Hempstead Stakes for two-year-olds at Jamaica Race Course. In 1907, Odom led all trainers in wins at Washington Park Race Track in Chicago.

During his career, George Odom operated a public stable whose clients over the years included Robert L. Gerry, Sr., Marshall Field III, and Hollywood film mogul Louis B. Mayer who owned Odom's most famous runner, Busher, a future Hall of Fame filly who was voted 1945 American Horse of the Year honors. Odom also trained good runners such as Nimba and Tippity Witchet. Having won the 1904 Belmont Stakes as the jockey aboard Delhi, when he won it as a trainer in 1938 with Pasteurized he joined James G. Rowe Sr. as the only ones to ever win that American Classic both as a jockey and as a trainer.

Following the formation of the National Museum of Racing and Hall of Fame, George Odom was part of the 1955 inaugural class of inductees.

Married to Julie Murtha in 1902, in later years the Odoms made their home in Jamaica, New York. A few weeks after his eighty-second birthday, George Odom died on July 29, 1964, at Roosevelt Hospital in Manhattan, New York. Their son, George P. "Maje" Odom, was also a trainer.
