= Nash Turner =

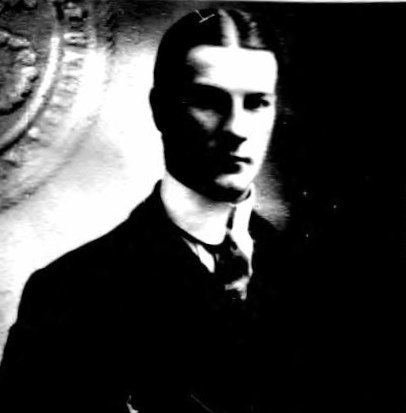
- Nash Turner, 1916

Personal information
- Born: 1881 Texas, U.S.
- Died: 1937 (aged 55–56)
- Occupation: Jockey / Owner

Horse racing career
- Sport: Horse racing
- Career wins: Not found

Major racing wins
- In the United States: Belles Stakes (1898); Jerome Handicap (1898); Clark Handicap (1899); Great American Stakes (1899, 1900); June Stakes (1899, 1900); Suburban Handicap (1899); Autumn Maiden Stakes (1900); Double Event Stakes (part 2) (1900); Hudson Stakes (1900); Islip Handicap (1900); National Stallion Stakes (1900); Withers Stakes (1900); Advance Stakes (1901); Alabama Stakes (1901); Junior Champion Stakes (1901); Saratoga Handicap (1901); Flatbush Stakes (1901, 1902); Great Trial Stakes (1902); Saratoga Special Stakes (1901, 1902); Matron Stakes (1902) American Classics wins: Belmont Stakes (1900); In France: French Classic Race wins: Prix du Jockey Club (1905); Grand Prix de Paris (1905); Prix de Diane (1906)

Honours
- United States Racing Hall of Fame (1955)

Significant horses
- Imp, Ildrim, Finasseur
- Updated on April 12, 2010

Nash Turner (1881–1937) was an American Hall of Fame jockey who competed in Thoroughbred horse racing in the United States and France.

A native of Texas, Nash Turner began his professional riding career in 1895 and by 1900 was one of the top ten jockeys in the United States. Although he is best remembered as the jockey of the U.S. Racing Hall of Fame filly, Imp, Nash Turner rode Ildrim to victory in the 1900 Belmont Stakes and captured the first two runnings of the Saratoga Special.

== In France ==
Nash Turner moved to race in France at the invitation of friend and Thoroughbred owner/trainer Eugene Leigh for whom he had won numerous races in the United States including the Belmont Stakes. Once there, Turner chose to make it his permanent home.

In 1905, Nash Turner had his best year as a jockey in France when he won two of the French Classic Races. In May 1905, for owner Michel Ephrussi, Turner won the Prix du Jockey Club with Finasseur and followed this up with another win on the colt in France's most important race at the time, the Grand Prix de Paris. The following year he won his third Classic race, capturing the Prix de Diane aboard the filly Flying Star. He finished the year as the 11th-leading rider in France.

Nash Turner's last year of riding was in 1914 after which he turned to training horses for himself and others. He died in France in 1937.

On its formation in 1955, Nash Turner was part of the inaugural class of inductees in the United States' National Museum of Racing and Hall of Fame.
