= H. Eugene Leigh =

American racehorse trainer (1860–1937)

Hiram Eugene Leigh
Personal information
- Born: August 25, 1860 Taylorville, Illinois, United States
- Died: December 10, 1937 (aged 77) Maisons-Laffitte, Yvelines, Île-de-France, France
- Occupation: Trainer / owner / breeder

Horse racing career
- Sport: Horse racing

Major racing wins
- Michigan Stakes (1893); Clark Handicap (1894); Flight Stakes (1894, 1896); Second Special Stakes (1894, 1895); Long Island Handicap (1897); Belles Stakes (1898); Great Eastern Handicap (1898); Great American Stakes (1899) American Classic Race wins Kentucky Derby (1894); Belmont Stakes (1900) European wins Prix du Rond-Point (1904, 1922); Prix Yacowlef (1922); Prix des Coteaux (1922); Grand Critérium (1922); Prix de la Forêt (1922); Critérium de Maisons-Laffitte (1922); Prix d'Ispahan (1923, 1926); Prix du Gros Chêne (1923); Stewards' Cup (1923); Prix Maurice de Gheest (1933)

Significant horses
- Ben Brush, Chant, Clifford, Épinard, Ildrim

Hiram Eugene Leigh (August 25, 1860 – December 10, 1937) was an American Thoroughbred racehorse trainer/owner and breeder who had a highly successful career in the United States as well as in Europe.

Born in Taylorville, Illinois, he was known by his middle name, Eugene, or as "Gene." In the 1870s, thirteen-year-old Leigh became involved in Quarter Horse racing on bush tracks in his native Illinois. After learning to condition Thoroughbreds for flat racing he set himself up as a trainer in a partnership with jockey Tom Kiley. Leigh was successful enough that in 1884 he was hired as the trainer of a major racing stable in St. Louis, Missouri owned by Col. Robert C. Pate.

By the early 1890s, Eugene Leigh had established himself as an important owner and trainer and in 1894 won the Kentucky Derby with Chant. He acquired property at Yarnallton, Kentucky where he established La Belle Stud farm but sold it in 1897 to Col. Milton Young for $101 an acre then bought it back in 1899 for $24 an acre. The December 4, 1898 issue of The New York Times reported that going into the 1899 racing season, Eugene Leigh had the largest stable in the United States. In 1900, Leigh earned his second win in an American Classic Race, capturing the Belmont Stakes with his colt Ildrim.

== Move to Europe ==
Eugene Leigh met with his first great success at Monmouth Park and other racetracks in New Jersey. However, legislation passed by conservative politicians in 1894 banned betting on races which resulted in the closure of the State's racetracks. Conservative forces in the State of New York wanted similar legislation and through 1895 Leigh was optimistic about the future of racing. Eventually the growing possibility of a ban on betting, along with personal financial setbacks from heavy gambling, saw Eugene Leigh make the decision to relocate to Europe for the 1901 season.

In England, Leigh established a racing stable at Foxhill, a village west of Swindon in Wiltshire county. In 1902, he purchased the broodmare Merry Token and sold her to August Belmont Jr. in New York. Bred to Belmont's Rock Sand, Merry Token produced Mahubah who became the dam of the legendary Man O'War.

Eugene Leigh began racing in France where he rented a château near the Maisons-Laffitte Racecourse. There, he managed a stable of more than two hundred horses that was the most modern of its time. Credited with improving the wellbeing of his horses, Leigh was responsible for introducing lightweight horseshoes into French racing. Dubbed by French racing fans as "le sorcier de Maisons-Laffitte" (the Wizard of Maisons-Laffitte), in May 1904 the French Humane Society awarded Eugene Leigh a prize and a gold medal for the humane manner in which he handled and cared for his horses.

Eugene Leigh would live in France through the first two plus years of World War I returning occasionally to the United States to purchase bloodstock. He and his family relocated to the United States in early 1917 where he took over as manager of the thirty-two-horse stable of Edward B. McLean, owner of The Washington Post newspaper. Not long after the end of the War, Eugene Leigh returned to France where he became manager and trainer for the racing stable owned by Pierre Wertheimer. For Wertheimer, Leigh's most famous horse was Épinard, called by France Galop the fastest horse to be bred in France.

== Champions either owned, bred or trained by Eugene Leigh ==
- Ben Brush – the 1895 American Champion Two-Year-Old Colt. In 1894 Leigh and a partner, the African-American Hall of Fame inductee, Ed Brown, bought Ben Brush and raced him until part way through his 2-year-old campaign when they sold him to a major New York stable owner, Mike Dwyer.
- Clifford – owned in partnership with bookmaker Robert L. Rose, Clifford was the retrospective American Champion Three-Year-Old Male Horse of 1893 and the retrospective American Champion Older Male Horse of 1894 and a National Museum of Racing and Hall of Fame inductee.
- Chant – also owned in partnership with Robert L. Rose, Chant won the 1894 Kentucky Derby
- Épinard – the French Champion 2-Year-Old Colt of 1922 was owned by Pierre Wertheimer and trained by Eugene Leigh. They brought Épinard to the United States in 1924 to compete in the International Specials. He would be voted the retrospective American Champion Older Male Horse for 1924.
- Ildrim – owned and trained by Leigh, he won the 1900 Belmont Stakes
- Irish Lad – the 1902 retrospective American Champion Two-Year-Old Colt was bred by Eugene Leigh who sold him as a yearling to John E. Madden

Eugene Leigh died at Maisons-Laffitte on December 10, 1937, at age seventy-seven. He was survived by his wife and four daughters including Vera who, because of her ability to speak the French language flawlessly, joined the British SOE spy agency during World War II. Vera Leigh was captured in France and taken to Natzweiler-Struthof extermination camp where she was executed in 1944.
