= Edward Russell Thomas =

American businessman and sportsman (1875–1926)

Edward R. Thomas
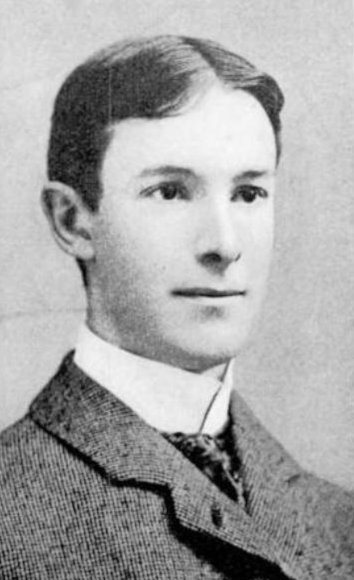
- Thomas at Yale, c. 1894
- Born: December 30, 1875; Columbus, Ohio, U.S.
- Died: July 6, 1926 (aged 50); New York City, U.S.
- Education: Yale University
- Occupations: Businessman, newspaper publisher
- Spouses: Linda Lee Thomas (m. 1901; div. 1912) Elizabeth Finley (m. 1912; div. 1924) Lucy Cotton (m. 1924)
- Children: 2
- Parent(s): Samuel Russell Thomas; Ann Augusta Porter Thomas

Edward Russell Thomas (December 30, 1875 – July 6, 1926) was an American businessman and sportsman.

== Early life and education ==
Edward Russell Thomas was born in Columbus, Ohio on December 30, 1875. He was a son of Ann Augusta (née Porter) Thomas (1847–1944) and Union general Samuel Russell Thomas (1840–1903), who left a fortune estimated at $20,000,000. His younger sister, Eleanor Thomas, was married to Robert Livingston Beeckman, who served as the Governor of Rhode Island from 1915 to 1921.

He graduated from Yale University in 1894.

== Career ==
Thomas was a senior member of Thomas & Thomas, a Wall Street firm. In 1904, he acquired the New York Morning Telegraph from the estate of William Collins Whitney.

On October 31, 1905, board vacancies of Consolidated National Bank were filled by E. R. Thomas, O. F. Thomas, Robert Maclay, and George B. Hays, all who were selected by E. R. Thomas. E.R. Thomas sold his interest in the Consolidated National Bank in October 1907, also resigning from his positions.

He was a member of the Union Club of the City of New York.

== Personal life ==
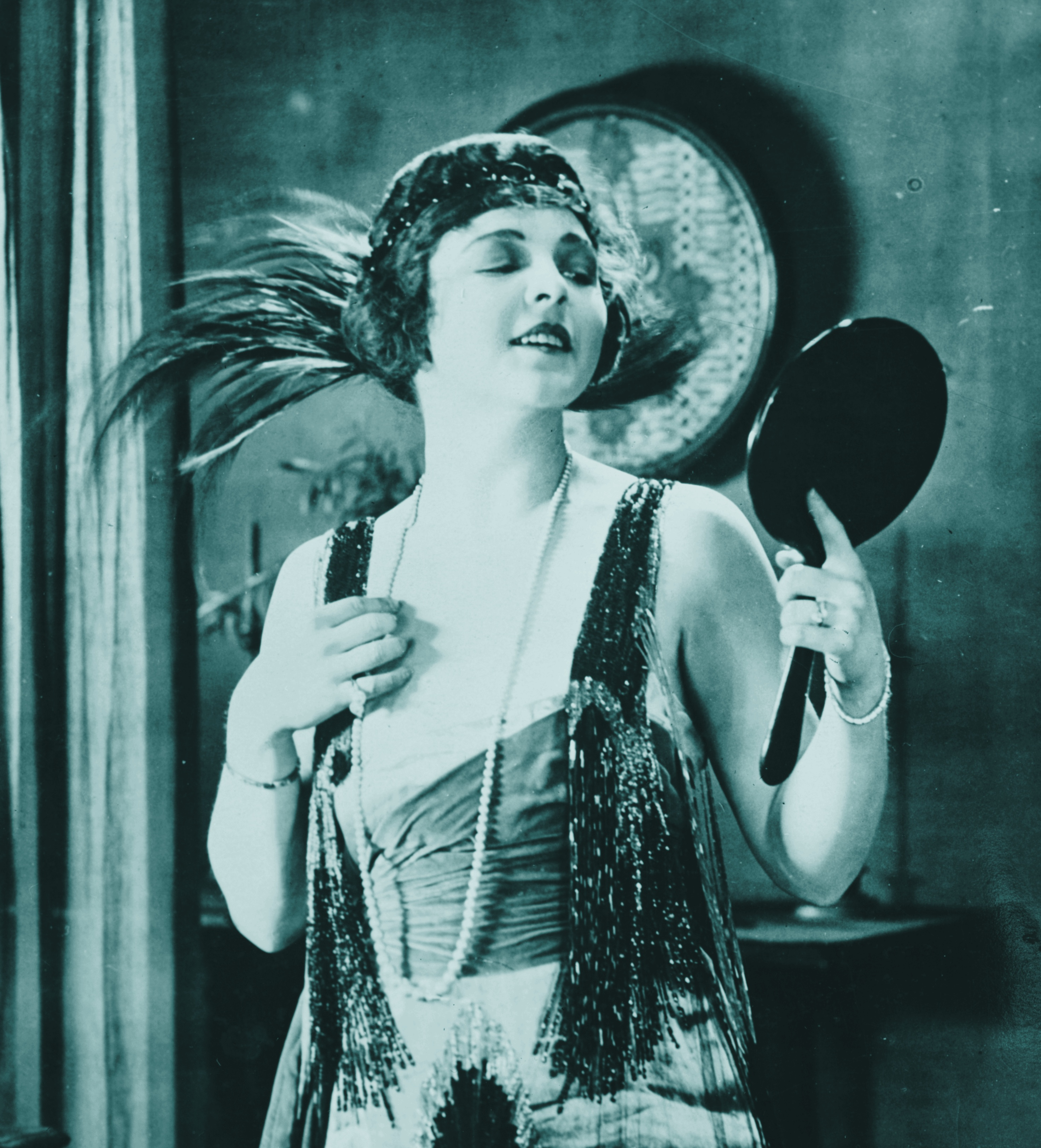
Thomas' third wife, Lucy Cotton

On June 29, 1901, he married 17 year old Linda Lee Thomas, a member of the prominent Lee family of Virginia, at Newport, Rhode Island. Linda, who was "known as one of the country's most beautiful women," was introduced to Thomas by friends and after their marriage, they lived a life of luxury, with houses in Palm Beach, Manhattan, and Newport. They divorced on October 26, 1912 and she later remarried to well-known musical theatre composer Cole Porter.

In 1912, on the day his first wife obtained her final divorce decree, he married Elizabeth Finley, a daughter of Henry Finley of New York City. Before their 1924 divorce in Florida, they were the parents of one son together: Samuel Finley Thomas (1913–1989), who became a medical doctor.

In 1924, he married actress Lucy Cotton, the daughter of Adelaide Wisby Cotton and Warren Jefferson Cotton. Together, they lived at 320 Park Avenue and were the parents of one daughter: Lucetta Cotton Thomas (1925–1980), who changed her name to Mary Frances Thomas and married Kenneth Oscar Bailey.

Thomas was the first person to kill someone with a privately owned automobile when on February 12, 1902 he hit 7-year-old Henry Theiss on Convent Avenue in Upper Manhattan. Thomas was exonerated for a crime but had to pay a settlement to Theiss’ family. Later he struck down and killed a woman in southern Italy with the same car, a three ton Damlier Phoenix touring car he bought from his friend William K. Vanderbilt, Jr. called the White Ghost which was by then painted red.

Thomas died after a three day illness at the Harbor Sanitarium in New York City on July 6, 1926. He was buried at Sleepy Hollow Cemetery in Sleepy Hollow, New York. His daughter Lucetta inherited Thomas' fortune.
