= Samuel S. Brown =

American businessman and racehorse owner

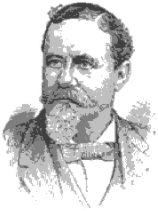
- Born: Samuel Smith Brown; December 15, 1842; Pittsburgh, Pennsylvania, United States
- Died: December 11, 1905 (aged 62); Pittsburgh, Pennsylvania, United States
- Resting place: Allegheny Cemetery, Pittsburgh, Pennsylvania
- Occupations: Coal magnate, Racehorse owner/breeder
- Board member of: National Bank of Commerce (Pittsburgh, Pa.), First Nation Bank (Dawson, Pa.), Ohio Railway Company
- Spouse: Lizzie P. Pollock
- Children: Frank Brown
- Parent(s): William Hughey Brown & Mary Smith
- Relatives: W. Harry Brown (brother)

Captain Samuel Smith Brown (December 15, 1842 – December 11, 1905) was an American businessman and a prominent Thoroughbred racehorse owner/breeder and racetrack owner.

== Early life ==
A native of Pittsburgh, Pennsylvania, Samuel Brown was a student at Washington & Jefferson College when he left to serve with the Union Army during the American Civil War. On February 22, 1861, Brown and Rhodes Stansbury Sutton founded the Delta Tau Delta fraternity chapter at Washington & Jefferson College, playing an instrumental role in saving the fraternity from extinction when the first Bethany College chapter closed.

From a wealthy family, he inherited coal mining operations founded by his father. He would grow and expand the business, operating six coal mines supported by a fleet of barges and a controlling interest in a railroad for shipping the coal. In addition, Brown owned several hotels in various cities around the United States.

== Thoroughbred racing ==
Samuel Brown owned Senorita Stock Farm near Lexington, Kentucky. Named for his favorite mare, the breeding farm's land is today occupied by the Kentucky Horse Park. He also invested in the Kentucky Association's Lexington Race Course, and the Bascombe Race Course in Mobile, Alabama which he used as a training base for his stable of Thoroughbred runners. Samuel Brown was one of the founding executives of the Brooklyn Jockey Club which, in 1886, built the Gravesend Race Track in New York.

For a number of years Brown's racehorses were trained by future Hall of Fame inductee John W. Rogers with whom he also raced horses in a partnership. Peter Wimmer succeeded Rogers as Samuel Brown's trainer and at the Brighton Beach Race Course on Coney Island, New York, jockey George Odom won the 1902 Brighton Derby with Brown's colt, Hyphen. On October 3, 1903, Peter Wimmer was succeeded by Robert Tucker who won the 1905 Kentucky Derby and the Tennessee Derby. Other important horses owned by Samuel Brown included:

- Buchanan (b. 1881) - won the 1884 Kentucky Derby
- Lamplighter (b. 1889) - raced at age two then sold for $30,000 to Pierre Lorillard IV
- Troubadour (b. 1882) - 1886 and 1887 retrospective American Champion Older Male Horse
- Broomstick (b. 1901) - Hall of Fame inductee, winner of the Travers Stakes who was the Leading sire in North America three times and twice the Leading broodmare sire in North America.
- Agile (b. 1902) - wins include the 1905 Kentucky Derby and Tennessee Derby

Capt. Samuel Brown died on December 11, 1905, and his brother, W. Harry Brown, continued on with the horse breeding business until November 23, 1908, when he sold the bloodstock through a Fasig-Tipton auction. Senorita Farm is the site of the present day Kentucky Horse Park.

== Bibliography ==
- New York Times obituary for Samuel S. Brown
