= Sheepshead Bay Race Track =

Horse racing course in Brooklyn, New York

Coordinates: 40°35′32″N 73°56′50″W

- Thoroughbred racing at Sheepshead Bay track c.1905 jam-packed with fans, even on the roof.
- Interactive map of Sheepshead Bay Race Track
- Location: Sheepshead Bay, Brooklyn, New York, United States
- Owned by: Coney Island Jockey Club
- Date opened: June 19, 1880 (146 years ago)
- Course type: Flat & Steeplechase

The Sheepshead Bay Race Track was an American Thoroughbred horse racing facility built on the site of the Coney Island Jockey Club at Sheepshead Bay in Brooklyn, New York.

== Early history ==
The racetrack was built by a group of prominent businessmen from the New York City area who formed the Coney Island Jockey Club in 1879. Led by Leonard Jerome, James R. Keene, and the track's president, William Kissam Vanderbilt, the Club held seasonal race cards at nearby Prospect Park fairgrounds until construction of the new race course was completed. On June 19, 1880 the track hosted its first day of Thoroughbred racing.

Old maps and railroad track diagrams for the Manhattan Beach Branch of the Long Island Rail Road showing the spur that served both the club and the racetrack indicates the entrance to the club was located on the east side of Ocean Avenue between Avenues X and Y. The Sheepshead Bay Race Track station contained six tracks and three island platforms.

Preceding station	Long Island Rail Road	Following station
Neck Road Terminus	Manhattan Beach Branch Racetrack spur	Terminus

In its first year of operations, the new Sheepshead Bay track hosted a 1½ mile match race between two of the top horses racing at the time in the United States. The Dwyer Brothers' Luke Blackburn was ridden by Jim McLaughlin, and Pierre Lorillard's Uncas was ridden by Tom Costello. Luke Blackburn won by twenty lengths.

Sheepshead Bay had both a dirt and a turf course.

Principal backers were:

- August Belmont Jr.
- Leonard Jerome
- James G. K. Lawrence
- Pierre Lorillard IV
- A. Wright Sanford
- William R. Travers
- William Kissam Vanderbilt

The new Sheepshead Bay Race Track's premier event was the Suburban Handicap, first run on June 10, 1884 and conceived by James G. K. Lawrence, who became the track's president. Four years later Lawrence would also create the Futurity Stakes, first run on Labor Day in 1888. At the time, the Futurity was the richest race ever run in the United States. Today, both the Suburban and the Futurity are ongoing Graded stakes races held at the Belmont Park racetrack in Elmont on Long Island. The Lawrence Realization Stakes was named for James G. K. Lawrence.

== First turf course in the United States ==
On June 10, 1886 the Coney Island Jockey Club opened the first turf racecourse in the United States. The Club replaced the Sheepshead Bay steeplechase course with a one-mile turf course, built inside the existing main dirt track. The Green Grass Stakes was the first race on turf and was run as part of the June 10 opening day program. A race for three-year-old horses, it was contested at a distance of a mile and an eighth and was won by Emory & Cotton's Dry Monopole in a time of 157.00.

== Demise ==
In 1908, the administration of Governor Charles Evans Hughes signed into law the Hart–Agnew bill that effectively banned all racetrack betting in the state of New York. The legislation allowed for fines and up to a year in prison which was strictly enforced.

Compounding matters for the Sheepshead Bay track was intense competition. In a summary of 1909 racing, the Daily Racing Form reported that "Sheepshead Bay, which for years led the country in daily average distribution, yielded first place in 1909 to Belmont Park, which August Belmont and his associates are ambitious to make the "turf headquarters of America"." A 1910 amendment to the Hart–Agnew legislation added further restrictions that made the owners and directors of a racetrack personally liable for any betting done on their premises, with or without their consent. Such an onerous liability was intolerable and meant that by 1911 all racetracks in the state ceased operations. Although a February 21, 1913 ruling by the New York Supreme Court, Appellate Division paved the way for racing to resume that year, by then it was too late for horse racing at the Sheepshead Bay Race Track and it was ultimately sold to the Sheepshead Bay Speedway Corporation who used it for automobile racing.

In December 1919, what the Daily Racing Form called one of the most famous racetracks in the history of the American turf, was purchased for real estate development. The facility was torn down and the land subdivided into building lots.

== Thoroughbred stakes races at Sheepshead Bay ==
Stakes race titles

=== Flat races ===
- Advance Stakes
- Annual Champion Stakes
- Autumn Cup Handicap
- Autumn Stakes
- Autumn Maiden Stakes
- Bay Ridge Handicap
- Belles Stakes
- Century Handicap
- Commonwealth Handicap
- Coney Island Derby
- Coney Island Handicap
- Daisy Stakes
- Dash Stakes
- Dolphin Stakes
- Double Event Stakes (part 1)
- Double Event Stakes (part 2)
- Equality Stakes
- Fall Handicap Ŧ
- Flatbush Stakes
- Flight Stakes
- Flying Handicap
- Foam Stakes
- Futurity Stakes
- Grass Selling Stakes
- Golden Rod Stakes
- Great Eastern Handicap
- Great Filly Stakes
- Great Trial Stakes
- June Stakes
- Lawrence Realization Stakes
- Long Island Handicap
- Mermaid Stakes
- Ocean Handicap Ŧ
- Omnium Handicap Ŧ
- Pansy Stakes
- Partridge Stakes
- Reapers Stakes
- Rosebuds Stakes
- Russet Stakes
- Sapphire Stakes
- September Stakes
- Sheepshead Bay Handicap
- Spring Stakes
- Spindrift Stakes
- Suburban Handicap
- Surf Stakes
- Swift Stakes
- Thistle Stakes
- Tidal Stakes
- Turf Handicap
- Twin City Handicap
- Vernal Stakes
- Waldorf Stakes
- Zephyr Stakes

Ŧ One of the three Sheepshead Bay Autumn Serials.

In 1959, the Sheepshead Bay Handicap was named in honor of the old racetrack, and first run at the now-defunct Jamaica Race Course in Jamaica, New York. It, too, is currently held at Belmont Park.

=== Steeplechase ===
- Beacon Steeplechase
- Independence Steeplechase
- Westbury Steeplechase

=== Sheepshead Bay Speedway Corporation ===
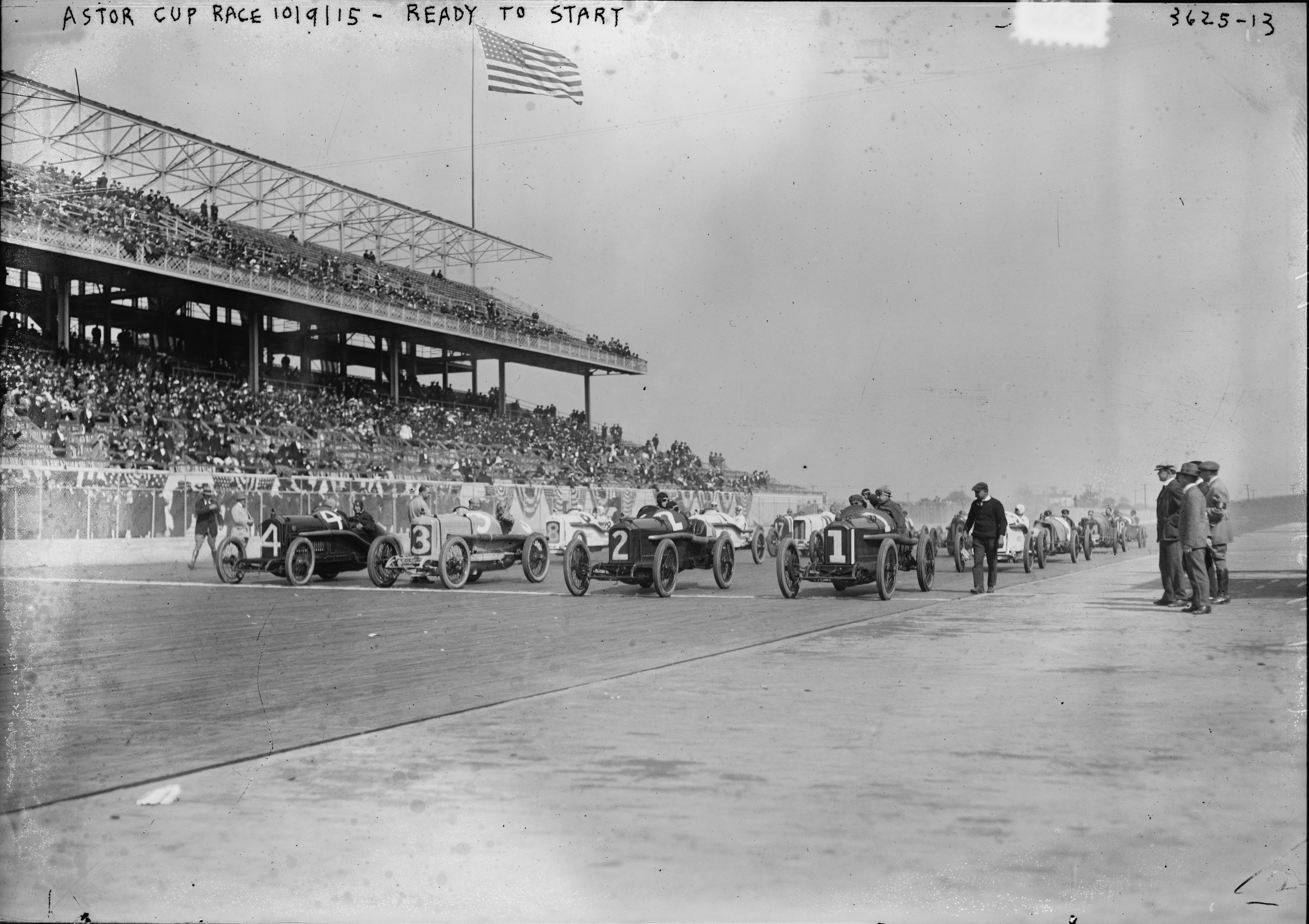
Astor Cup auto race at Sheepshead Bay

Auto racing at the Sheepshead Bay track c. 1919

The new owner converted the horse track to a board automobile race track. Several auto races were held from October 1915, through September 1919, including the Astor Cup Race and the Harkness Trophy Race. The Sheepshead Bay Speedway Corporation ran into financial difficulties following the death of its majority shareholder Harry Harkness in January 1919. The property was sold in 1923 for residential real estate development. No trace of the racetrack can be found today.

== See also ==
Other defunct New York race tracks:

- Aqueduct Racetrack
- Brighton Beach Race Course
- Fleetwood Park Racetrack
- Gravesend Race Track
- Jamaica Race Course
- Jerome Park Racetrack
- Morris Park Racecourse
