= Electioneer =

Racehorse (born 1904)

- Sire: Voter
- Grandsire: Friar's Balsam
- Dam: Quesal
- Damsire: Himyar
- Sex: Stallion
- Foaled: 1904
- Country: United States
- Color: Brown
- Breeder: Barak G. Thomas
- Owner: William Lakeland; J. Curtis van Ness (1906-09)
- Trainer: William Lakeland
- Record: 20: 5-6-1
- Earnings: US$56,671

Major wins
- Autumn Maiden Stakes (1906); Futurity Stakes (1906); Produce Stakes (1906)

Awards
- United States Two-Year-Old earnings leader

Electioneer (foaled April 20, 1904 in Kentucky) was an American Thoroughbred racehorse best known for his 1906 win in New York's rich Futurity Stakes.

== Background ==
Former Confederate Army soldier Major Barak G. Thomas bred Electioneer at his Dixiana Stud near Lexington, Kentucky. He was sired by the very fast Voter, the 1899 American Champion Handicap Male Horse. Among his other progeny, Voter sired Ballot who in turn was the damsire of Bull Lea, a stallion considered "one of the greatest sires in Thoroughbred breeding history." Electioneer's dam was Quesal, a nine-time winner at age three and four. She was a daughter of Himyar, the leading sire in North America of 1893. Himyar sired both 1898 Kentucky Derby winner Plaudit and future U.S. Racing Hall of Fame Domino, the grandsire of two Hall of Famers, Colin and Peter Pan.

At a June 26, 1905 auction at New York's Sheepshead Bay Race Track, Electioneer was purchased for $2,300 by horseman David A. Boyle on behalf of trainer William Lakeland, a future U.S. Racing Hall of Fame inductee.

== Racing career ==
=== 1906: Two-Year-Old Season ===
Electioneer made his racing debut for William Lakeland on July 13, 1906. Despite a bad start, he came back strongly to finish second, only a head behind the Newcastle Stable colt McCarter in a six furlong non-stakes event at New York's Brighton Beach Race Course. At the same racetrack, his next start was in the July 25 Montauk Stakes. Another six furlong race, Electioneer was second again to Salvidere who would go on to be recognized as that year's American Champion Two-Year-Old Colt for owner Thomas Hitchcock Sr. On August 6 at Saratoga Race Course, for the third straight time Electioneer ran second. This was the five and one-half furlong Flash Stakes and was won by the James R. Keene colt, Peter Pan who at age three in 1907 would become the National Champion and go on to a career that led to his induction into the U.S. Racing Hall of Fame. Electioneer's next start would not be just a winning effort but victory in the richest and most important race of the year for American juvenile horses. Ridden by Willie Shaw, at Sheepshead Bay Race Track Electioneer beat a strong field of fourteen other runners in the September 1 Futurity Stakes that included Peter Pan and future two-time National Champion Ballot. Electioneer's first three career races had brought a total of $1,200 in earnings but the Futurity win added $36,880 to that.

On September 3, just two days after winning the Futurity, on the same Sheepshead Bay track Electioneer easily won the five furlong Autumn Maiden Stakes by six lengths. Making his third start in one week, Electioneer was sent off as the betting favorite in the September 8 Flatbush Stakes at Sheepshead Bay. The colt tired badly in the stretch and ended up fifth to winner De Mund. Shortly thereafter, Electioneer was sold to J. Curtis van Ness. Given a good rest, Electioneer came back to earn earned another good purse with a win over De Mund in the male division of the October 1 Produce Stakes at Brighton Beach Race Course.

Electioneer's $53,701 in earnings for 1906 would be the most of any two-year-old in the United States.

=== 1907: Three-Year-Old Season ===
Competing at age three, Electioneer ran second to Peter Pan in the Standard Stakes and to Ballot in the First Special Stakes, both mile and one-quarter events at Brooklyn's Gravesend Race Track. He then ran third behind Ballot and Salvidere in the Second Special Stakes at a mile and one-half before getting his only win of 1907 in a non-stakes race at a mile. From eight starts, he earned just $2,680.

== At stud ==
Electioneer was retired from racing with plans to stand him at stud in 1908. However, the racing and breeding industry was thrown into massive uncertainty when, on June 11, 1908, the Republican controlled New York Legislature under Governor Charles Evans Hughes passed the Hart-Agnew anti-betting legislation. After a 1911 amendment to the law that would limit the liability of owners and directors was defeated in the Legislature, every racetrack in New York State shut down. As a result, owners, whose horses of racing age had nowhere to go, began shipping them and their trainers to England and France. Many ended their racing careers there, and a number remained to become an important part of the European horse breeding industry. Thoroughbred Times reported that more than 1,500 American horses were sent overseas between 1908 and 1913 and that of them, at least 24 were either past, present, or future Champions.

Given the circumstances, Electioneer did not get any mares to breed with in 1908. Sent to Timberland Stud farm near Lexington, Kentucky in 1909, Electioneer sired eight runners then in 1910 just three and in 1911 only ten. At that point, with some horse racing still happening on a limited basis at tracks outside New York state, his owner decided to try racing Electioneer. He made one start in 1911, running unplaced. In 1912, the now eight-year-old made four starts in minor events, earning a win and running second in another.

A February 21, 1913 ruling by the New York Supreme Court, Appellate Division saw horse racing return in 1913. However, the damage to the breeding industry was already done and demand for stallion services from Electioneer were non-existent.

== Pedigree ==
Pedigree of Electioneer, brown stallion, 1904
Sire Voter	Friar's Balsam	Hermit	Newminster
Sire Voter	Friar's Balsam	Hermit	Seclusion
Sire Voter	Friar's Balsam	Flower of Dorset	Breadalbane
Sire Voter	Friar's Balsam	Flower of Dorset	Imperatrice
Sire Voter	Mavourneen	Barcaldine	Solon
Sire Voter	Mavourneen	Barcaldine	Ballyroe
Sire Voter	Mavourneen	Gaydene	Albert Victor
Sire Voter	Mavourneen	Gaydene	Flora Macdonald
Dam Quesal	Himyar	Alarm	Eclipse
Dam Quesal	Himyar	Alarm	Maud
Dam Quesal	Himyar	Hira	Lexington*
Dam Quesal	Himyar	Hira	Hegira
Dam Quesal	Queen Ban	King Ban	King Tom
Dam Quesal	Queen Ban	King Ban	Atlantis
Dam Quesal	Queen Ban	War Reel	War Dance*
Dam Quesal	Queen Ban	War Reel	Dixie (family: 1-o)

* Electioneer is inbred 4D x 5D to the stallion Lexington, meaning that he appears fourth generation and fifth generation (via War Dance) on the dam side of his pedigree.
