= Autumn Maiden Stakes =

- Class: Discontinued stakes
- Location: Sheepshead Bay Race Track, Sheepshead Bay, Brooklyn, New York, United States
- Inaugurated: 1899
- Race type: Thoroughbred - Flat racing

Race information
- Distance: 5.5 furlongs
- Surface: Dirt
- Track: left-handed
- Qualification: Two-year-old maidens

The Autumn Maiden Stakes was an American Thoroughbred horse race held annually near the end of the racing season each fall at Sheepshead Bay Race Track in Sheepshead Bay, Brooklyn, New York. Run from 1893 through 1909, it was a Maiden race on dirt for two-year-olds of either sex that had not yet won a race at the time of official registration for that year’s event.

== Distances ==
- 1893-1904, 1906, 1907: 5/8 mi (5 furlongs; 1,006 m)
- 1905, 1908, 1909 at 5½ furlongs

== Raison d'être ==
For horse owners, as well as their trainer, having their horse earn its first victory was very important. Being winless near the end of the racing season was frustrating for the owner who would have spent a considerable amount of money buying the horse, then paying for all its racing costs including for its stabling, feed, trainer, veterinarian, entry fees, travel etc. For the trainer, a winless year usually resulted in dismissal. As such, the Autumn Maiden Stakes meant a great deal.

In the case of Ormonde's Right, after winning the 1903 Autumn Maiden Stakes, the gelding won that year’s Neptune Stakes at the Brighton Beach Race Course and would go on to a good racing career, winning such events as the important Carter Handicap in 1905.

In 1906, Electioneer won this race and went on to win the Futurity Stakes, one of the richest races in America that earned $36,880 for Electioneer, more than ten times the $3,375 he earned for winning the Autumn Maiden Stakes.

Other Autumn Maiden Stakes winners went on to more victories the following year at age three such as:

- Lady Bedford - Coney Island Handicap (SHB)
- Lawrence P. Daley - Canadian Derby (FE,10f), Van Courtlandt Handicap (BEL,7f)
- Arsenal - Metropolitan Handicap
- Duke of Middleburg - Washington Handicap, Carter Handicap
- King Lief - Crotona Handicap (Morris Park,6f)

== The race’s demise ==
The 1908 passage of the Hart-Agnew anti-betting legislation by the New York Legislature under Republican Governor Charles Evans Hughes led to a state-wide shutdown of racing in 1911 and 1912. Having no alternative to survive without income from wagering, the Sheepshead Bay Race Track had no choice but to cut the race’s total purse money for 1908 by more than 70% from its 1907 level. The following year it was reduced again to less than 13% of what it had been at its peak in 1907.

It would be five years after Hart-Agnew became law that a February 21, 1913 ruling by the New York Supreme Court, Appellate Division saw horse racing return in that year. However, by then it was too late for horse racing at the Sheepshead Bay track and it was ultimately sold.

== Records ==
Speed record:

- 0:59.20 @ 5 furlongs: Arsenal (1901)
- 1:06.80 @ 5.5 furlongs: Lady Bedford (1908)

Most wins by a jockey:

- no jockey won this race more than once

Most wins by a trainer:

- A. Jack Joyner (1893, 1903, 1904)

Most wins by an owner:

- August Belmont Jr. (1893, 1897)
- Sydney Paget (1903, 1904)

== Winners ==
Year	Winner	Jockey	Trainer	Owner	Dist. (Furlongs)	Time	Win $
1909	Ben Loyal	Charles Grand	John Hynes	Rangeley Stable	5.5 F	1:07.00	$460
1908	Lady Bedford	Carroll Shilling	John E. Madden	John E. Madden	5.5 F	1:06.80	$1,050
1907	Lawrence P. Daley	Dave Nicol	William E. Phillips	Fred Cook	5 F	1:00.00	$3,575
1906	Electioneer	Leroy Williams	William Lakeland	William Lakeland	5 F	1:00.60	$3,375
1905	Blair Athol	Tommy Burns	John J. Hyland	Walter M. Scheftel	5.5 F	1:07.20	$3,350
1904	Woodsaw	Lucien Lyne	A. Jack Joyner	Sydney Paget	5 F	0:59.80	$3,300
1903	Ormonde's Right	Frank O'Neill	A. Jack Joyner	Sydney Paget	5 F	1:00.60	$3,240
1902	Parisienne	Otto Wonderly	Barry Littlefield	James B. A. Haggin	5 F	0:59.60	$3,530
1901	Arsenal	Winfield O'Connor	Julius Bauer	Arthur Featherstone	5 F	0:59.20	$2,480
1900	King Lief	Nash Turner	John Dillard Smith Jr.	John Dillard Smith Jr.	5 F	1:01.80	$2,440
1899	Elfin Conig	Eugene Van Keuren	Charles L. Railey	Charles L. Railey	5 F	1:02.40	$2,440
1898	Duke of Middleburg	Fred Littlefield	R. Wyndham Walden	Alfred H. & Dave H. Morris	5 F	1:03.00	$2,100
1897	Lady Marian	Harry Hewitt	John J. Hyland	August Belmont Jr.	5 F	1:02.00	$1,430
1896	Sunny Slope	Fred Taral	Jere Dunn	Jere Dunn	5 F	1:01.00	$1,425
1895	Silver II	Charles A. Ballard	Matthew Byrnes	Marcus Daly	5 F	1:01.80	$1,540
1894	The Sage	Henry Griffin	James G. Rowe Sr.	Brookdale Stable (Col. William Payne Thompson)	5 F	1:01.00	$1,845
1893	Economist	Anthony Hamilton	A. Jack Joyner	August Belmont Jr.	5 F	1:03.00	$1,275
