= Produce Stakes (United States) =

20th-century American horse racing event

- Class: Discontinued stakes
- Location: Brighton Beach Race Course, Brighton Beach, New York, United States
- Inaugurated: 1902
- Race type: Thoroughbred - Flat racing

Race information
- Distance: 6 furlongs
- Surface: Dirt
- Track: left-handed
- Qualification: Two-year-old Fillies / Two-year-old colts & geldings

The Produce Stakes was an American Thoroughbred racing event run in two divisions from 1902 thru 1907 at Brighton Beach Race Course at Brighton Beach, New York.

One of the more valuable races for two-year-olds in the United States, there was a division for fillies and another for colts and geldings.

The race was short lived when the entire United States horse racing and breeding industry was thrown into massive uncertainty as a result of the June 11, 1908 action by the Republican controlled New York Legislature under Governor Charles Evans Hughes which passed the Hart-Agnew anti-betting legislation. After a 1911 amendment to the law that would limit the liability of owners and directors was defeated in the Legislature, every racetrack in New York State shut down with wide-ranging effects throughout the entire country. Owners whose horses of racing age had nowhere to go began shipping them and their trainers to England and France. Many ended their racing careers there, and a number remained to become an important part of the European horse breeding industry. Thoroughbred Times reported that more than 1,500 American horses were sent overseas between 1908 and 1913 and that of them, at least 24 were either past, present, or future Champions.

Scheduled to be run on September 28, 1908, the Brighton Beach racetrack's financial problems resulted in the Produce Stakes being canceled. No longer financially viable, Thoroughbred racing was never held again at that track.

== Fillies Division ==
=== Historic notes ===
The 1902 inaugural race was won by Eugenia Burch whose winning time of 1:12.60 would prove to be not only the fastest ever in this event, but it equaled the fastest ever time recorded in the male division. Eugenia Burch would be recognized as that year's American Champion Two-Year-Old Filly and would earn the same recognition the following year at age three. Similarly, 1906 winner Court Dress would receive the same two National Champion honors as did Stamina in 1907.

== Fillies Division Records ==
Speed record:

- 1:12.60 @ 6 furlongs: Eugenia Burch (1902)

Most wins by a jockey:

- 2 - George M. Odom (1902, 1903)

Most wins by a trainer:

- 2 - John W. Rogers (1904, 1907)

Most wins by an owner:

- No owner won this race more than once.

== Winners ==
Year	Winner	Age	Jockey	Trainer	Owner	Dist. (Miles)	Time	Win $
1907	Stamina	2	Joe Notter	John W. Rogers	Harry Payne Whitney	6 f	1:14.00	$11,625
1906	Court Dress	2	Herman Radtke	James G. Rowe Sr.	James R. Keene	6 f	1:12.80	$11,754
1905	Tiptoe	2	Frank O'Neill	A. Jack Joyner	August Belmont Jr.	6 f	1:13.80	$10,966
1904	Princess Rupert	2	Willie Shaw	John W. Rogers	Herman B. Duryea	6 f	1:15.00	$5,005
1903	Audience	2	George M. Odom	Peter Wimmer	Samuel S. Brown	6 f	1:15.80	$5,841
1902	Eugenia Burch	2	George M. Odom	Jim McLaughlin	Libby Curtis	6 f	1:12.60	$5,444

== Colts & Geldings Division ==
=== Historic notes ===
The inaugural running of the Produce Stakes for males took place on July 19, 1902. It was won by Mexican, a colt ridden by future U.S. Racing Hall of Fame inductee Winfield O'Connor for owner Clarence H. Mackay.

The 1907 edition would prove to be the final running of the Produce Stakes but it did provide the event's most noteworthy winner in Colin. Owned by James R. Keene, a Wall Street financier and major figure in Thoroughbred racing and breeding, Colin was trained by James G. Rowe Sr., a future Hall of Famer widely regarded as the greatest trainer in Thoroughbred racing history. Undefeated in 15 career starts, including the 1908 Belmont Stakes, Colin was the 1907 and 1908 American Horse of the Year who would also become a Hall of Fame inductee and was ranked 15th in the Blood-Horse magazine List of the Top 100 U.S. Racehorses of the 20th Century.

== Colts & Geldings Division Records ==
Speed record:

- 1:12.60 @ 6 furlongs: 4 horses tied

Most wins by a jockey:

- 2 - Willie Knapp (1905, 1906)

Most wins by a trainer:

- 2 - James G. Rowe Sr. (1905, 1907)

Most wins by an owner:

- 2 - James R. Keene (1905, 1907)

== Winners ==
Year	Winner	Age	Jockey	Trainer	Owner	Dist. (Miles)	Time	Win $
1907	Colin	2	Walter Miller	James G. Rowe Sr.	James R. Keene	6 f	1:12.60	$9,874
1906	Electioneer	2	Willie Knapp	William Lakeland	J. Curtis van Ness	6 f	1:12.60	$11,222
1905	Kuroki	2	Willie Knapp	James G. Rowe Sr.	James R. Keene	6 f	1:13.00	$9,717
1904	Diamond	2	Lucien Lyne	A. Jack Joyner	Sidney Paget	6 f	1:13.20	$5,094
1903	Stalwart	2	Arthur Redfern	William Shields	Edward R. Thomas	6 f	1:12.60	$4,258
1902	Mexican	2	Winfield O'Connor	Charles F. Hill	Clarence H. Mackay	6 f	1:12.60	$6,550
