= Iroquois Stakes (Brighton Beach) =

- Class: Defunct horse race
- Location: Brighton Beach Race Course, Brighton Beach, Brooklyn, New York, United States
- Inaugurated: 1901-1907
- Race type: Thoroughbred - Flat racing

Race information
- Distance: 1 1/4 mi (10 furlongs; 2,012 m)
- Surface: Dirt
- Track: left-handed
- Qualification: Three-year-olds

The Iroquois Stakes was an American Thoroughbred horse race for three-year-old horses that was run six times from 1901 through 1907 at Brighton Beach Race Course in the Brighton Beach section of Brooklyn,
New York.

The race and the racetrack’s demise came in 1908 as a result of the passage that year of the Hart–Agnew anti-betting legislation by the New York Legislature under Republican Governor Charles Evans Hughes.

The loss of income from wagering, left racetrack operators no choice but to drastically reduce the purse money being paid out which resulted in the Iroquois Stakes cutting the purse in 1908 down to one-quarter of what it had been in recent years. These small purses made horse racing unprofitable and impossible for even the most successful horse owners to continue in business.

At the time the Brighton Beach Race Course ceased Thoroughbred racing operations, it was the oldest horse track in steady use in the New York City area.

== Records ==
Speed record:

- 2:05.00 @ 1/1/4 miles – Ballot
- 1:54.00 @ 1 1/8 miles – Old England

Most wins by a jockey:

- 2 – Willie Shaw (1902, 1906)

Most wins by a trainer:

- no trainer won this race more than once

Most wins by an owner:

- no owner won this race more than once

== Winners ==
| Year | Winner | Jockey | Trainer | Owner | Dist. (Miles) | Time | Win $ |
|---|---|---|---|---|---|---|---|
| 1907 | Ballot | Joe Notter | James G. Rowe Sr. | James R. Keene | 11/4 M | 2:05.00 | $5,850 |
| 1906 | Samson | Willie Shaw | Fred Burlew | Fred Burlew | 11/4 M | 2:07.00 | $5,850 |
| 1905 * | Race not held | | | | | | |
| 1904 | St. Valentine | Arthur Redfern | William Shields | Edward R. Thomas | 11/8 M | 1:56.50 | $4,005 |
| 1903 | Fire Eater | John Bullman | A. Jack Joyner | August Belmont Jr. | 11/8 M | 1:58.60 | $3,900 |
| 1902 | Old England | Willie Shaw | Green B. Morris | Green B. Morris | 11/8 M | 1:54.00 | $3,900 |
| 1901 | Watercolor | Henry Spencer | Charles N. Littlefield | Charles N. Littlefield | 11/4 M | 2:07.00 | $3,850 |

- The table of winners as per the reference, shows "no race" in 1905. The same source contradicts this in an article on the horse Sysonby, not on the actual race, stating in a summary of his career wins that he won the 1905 Iroquois Stakes at Brighton Beach.
