= Court Dress (horse) =

American Thoroughbred horse

- Sire: Disguise
- Grandsire: Domino
- Dam: Hampton Belle
- Damsire: Hampton
- Sex: Filly
- Foaled: 1904
- Country: United States
- Color: Chestnut
- Breeder: James R. Keene
- Owner: James R. Keene
- Trainer: James G. Rowe Sr.
- Record: 13: 6-2-2
- Earnings: US$36,539

Major wins
- Criterion Stakes (1906); Fashion Stakes (1906); Gaiety Stakes (1906); Produce Stakes (1906); Spinaway Stakes (1906); Gazelle Handicap (1907)

Awards
- American Champion Two-Year-Old Filly (1906); American Co-Champion Three-Year-Old Filly (1907)

Court Dress (foaled 1904 in Kentucky) was a two-time American National Champion Thoroughbred filly bred and raced by James R. Keene.

Trained by future U.S. Racing Hall of Fame inductee James G. Rowe Sr., Court Dress won five significant stakes races in 1906 including the Criterion, Fashion and the Spinaway. Those performances led to Court Dress being recognized as the American Champion Two-Year-Old Filly.

Racing at age three, Court Dress had her best outings of 1907 when she beat Yankee Girl to win the Gazelle Stakes and ran third to Yankee Girl in both the Ladies Handicap and the Mermaid Stakes. She and John Sanford's Kennyetto would share American Champion Three-Year-Old Filly honors for 1907.

== As a broodmare ==
In September, Court Dress was retired from racing and was sent to stand as a stud mare at her owner's Castleton Farm near Lexington, Kentucky. However, on June 11, 1908, the Republican controlled New York Legislature under Governor Charles Evans Hughes had passed the Hart–Agnew anti-betting legislation. After a 1911 amendment to the law that would limit the liability of owners and directors was defeated in the Legislature, every racetrack in New York State shut down. As a result, owners, whose horses of racing age had nowhere to go, began shipping them and their trainers to England and France. Many ended their racing careers there, and a number remained to become an important part of the European horse breeding industry. Thoroughbred Times reported that more than 1,500 American horses were sent overseas between 1908 and 1913 and of them, at least 24 were either past, present, or future Champions.

Court Dress was bred to former racing stars and successful sires; Ben Brush in 1908 and Voter in 1909 and 1910. However, with the complete shutdown of racing in New York state and owner James R. Keene on his deathbed, the decision was made to sell Court Dress along with five other of his broodmares, Early and Often, Maskette, Megg's Hill, Mosquito, Pope Joan, and Stepping Stone. At a time when there was limited demand for racehorses in the United States, they were purchased by the wealthy American socialite and horseman William K. Vanderbilt who wanted the still valuable mares to ship them to his newly built Haras du Quesnay in Normandy, France. Having already been bred to Peter Pan, when shipped overseas Court Dress was carrying a foal that would be born in France in 1913 and named Courtney.

None of Court Dress's foals made an impact in racing in either the United States or in Europe but two of her daughters, Inaugural (1910) and Coronis (1911), helped to provide her with a noteworthy place in Thoroughbred breeding history. Both sired by Voter, some of their successful descendants includes Affirmed, Charismatic, Deputy Minister, Exclusive Native, Genuine Risk, Go and Go, Makybe Diva, Pavot and Riverman.

== Pedigree ==
Pedigree of Court Dress, chestnut mare, 1904
Sire Disguise	Domino	Himyar	Alarm
Sire Disguise	Domino	Himyar	Hira
Sire Disguise	Domino	Mannie Gray	Enquirer
Sire Disguise	Domino	Mannie Gray	Lizzie G
Sire Disguise	Bonnie Gal	Galopin	Vedette
Sire Disguise	Bonnie Gal	Galopin	Flying Duchess
Sire Disguise	Bonnie Gal	Bonnie Doon	Rapid Rhone
Sire Disguise	Bonnie Gal	Bonnie Doon	Queen Mary
Dam Hampton Belle	Hampton	Lord Clifden	Newminster
Dam Hampton Belle	Hampton	Lord Clifden	The Slave
Dam Hampton Belle	Hampton	Lady Langden	Kettledrum
Dam Hampton Belle	Hampton	Lady Langden	Haricot
Dam Hampton Belle	Silver Bell	Breadalbane	Stockwell
Dam Hampton Belle	Silver Bell	Breadalbane	Blink Bonny
Dam Hampton Belle	Silver Bell	The Pet	Kettledrum
Dam Hampton Belle	Silver Bell	The Pet	Scarlet Runner (family: 10-a)
