= Century Handicap =

- Class: Discontinued horse
- Location: Sheepshead Bay Race Track; Brooklyn, New York
- Inaugurated: 1901
- Race type: Thoroughbred – Flat racing

Race information
- Distance: 1 1/2 miles (12 furlongs)
- Surface: Dirt
- Track: left-handed
- Qualification: Three-year-olds & up
- Weight: Weight for Age
- Purse: US$20,000

The Century Handicap was an American Thoroughbred horse race held annually from 1901 through 1909 at Sheepshead Bay Race Track in Brooklyn, New York. A Weight for Age race open to horses age three and older, it was contested on dirt over a distance of a mile and a half (12 furlongs).

Run as the Century Stakes until 1908, the race was last run in September 1909 after the Republican controlled New York Legislature under Governor Charles Evans Hughes passed the Hart–Agnew anti-betting legislation on June 11, 1908. The owners of Sheepshead Bay Race Track, and other racing facilities in New York State, struggled to stay in business without betting. However, further restrictive legislation was passed by the New York Legislature in 1910 which resulted in the deepening of the financial crisis for track operators and led to a complete shut down of racing across the state during 1911 and 1912. When a Court ruling saw racing return in 1913 it was too late for the Sheepshead Bay facility and it never reopened.

== Records ==
Speed record:

- 2:30.60 – Ballot (1908) (new track record)

Most wins:

- 2 – Ballot (1907, 1908)

Most wins by a jockey:

- 2 – David Nicol (1905, 1907)

Most wins by a trainer:

- 3 – James G. Rowe Sr. (1905, 1907, 1908)

Most wins by an owner:

- 3 – James R. Keene (1905, 1907, 1908)

== Winners ==
Year	Winner	Age	Jockey	Trainer	Owner	Dist. (Miles)	Time	Win$
1909	Moquette	4	Eddie Dugan	Sam Hildreth	Sam Hildreth	1-1/2 m	2:34.40	$775
1908	Ballot	4	Joe Notter	James G. Rowe Sr.	James R. Keene	1-1/2 m	2:30.60	$15,650
1907	Ballot	3	David Nicol	James G. Rowe Sr.	James R. Keene	1-1/2 m	2:33.60	$14,650
1906	Bedouin	4	Gene Hildebrand	John Huggins	Edward W. Jewett	1-1/2 m	2:33.60	$14,650
1905	Sysonby	3	David Nicol	James G. Rowe Sr.	James R. Keene	1-1/2 m	2:33.00	$14,650
1904	Stalwart	3	Arthur Redfern	William Shields	Edward R. Thomas	1-1/2 m	2:31.20	$14,650
1903	Waterboy	4	Frank O'Neill	A. Jack Joyner	James B. A. Haggin	1-1/2 m	2:31.60	$15,150
1902	Blues	3	Jack Martin	Thomas Welsh	Frank Farrell	1-1/2 m	2:33.20	$11,700
1901	Watercolor	3	Henry Spencer	Charles N. Littlefield	James B. A. Haggin	1-1/2 m	2:32.00	$7,750
