= Equality Stakes =

- Class: Discontinued stakes
- Location: Sheepshead Bay Race Track; Sheepshead Bay, Brooklyn, New York, United States
- Inaugurated: 1902
- Race type: Thoroughbred – Flat racing

Race information
- Distance: 1 mile (8 furlongs)
- Surface: Dirt
- Track: left-handed
- Qualification: Three years old & up

The Equality Stakes was an American Thoroughbred horse race run annually from 1902 thru 1909 at Sheepshead Bay Race Track at Sheepshead Bay, New York. Open to horses age three and older, it was raced over a distance of one mile on dirt.

== Historical notes ==
The inaugural running of the Equality Stakes produced a dead heat between Dublin and Highlander.

The three-year-old gelding Dolly Spanker won the 1904 edition of the Equality Stakes as part of a long and successful career winning on both dirt and turf. A popular runner, the New York Times called Dolly Spanker "one of the best-know flat racers in the country" and had been "one of the best handicap horses on the Metropolitan tracks."

The 1908 Equality stakes was won by James R. Keene's Ballot who would be named American Champion Older Male Horse for that year and again in 1910.

== The End of a Race and of a Racetrack ==
Passage of the Hart–Agnew anti-betting legislation by the New York Legislature under Republican Governor Charles Evans Hughes led to a compete shutdown of racing in 1911 and 1912 in the state. A February 21, 1913 ruling by the New York Supreme Court, Appellate Division saw horse racing return in 1913. However, it was too late for the Sheepshead Bay horse racing facility and it never reopened.

== Records ==
Speed record:

- 1:38 flat @ 1 mile : Dolly Spanker (1904)

Most wins:

- 2 – Hamburg Belle (1905, 1906)

Most wins by a jockey:

- No jockey ever won this race more than once.

Most wins by a trainer:

- 2 – T. J. Healey (1902, 1904)
- 2 – A. Jack Joyner (1905, 1906)

Most wins by an owner:

- 2 – Richard T. Wilson Jr. (1902, 1904)
- 2 – Sydney Paget (1905, 1906)

== Winners ==
Year	Winner	Age	Jockey	Trainer	Owner	Dist. (Miles)	Time	Win $
1909	Arcite	5	Vincent Powers	Peter Coyne	George J. Long	1 m	1:39.20	$390
1908	Ballot	4	Joe Notter	James G. Rowe Sr.	James R. Keene	1 m	1:39.00	$3,840
1907	Frank Gill	3	Willie Knapp	John I. Smith	Jack L. McGinnis	1 m	†	$4,980
1906	Hamburg Belle	5	Walter Miller	A. Jack Joyner	Sydney Paget	1 m	1:39.20	$4,120
1905	Hamburg Belle	4	Willie Davis	A. Jack Joyner	Sydney Paget	1 m	1:40.00	$4,035
1904	Dolly Spanker	3	Gene Hildebrand	Thomas J. Healey	Richard T. Wilson Jr.	1 m	1:38.00	$4,780
1903	Goldsmith	4	Arthur Redfern	John W. Rogers	William C. Whitney	1 m	1:40.00	$4,250
1902 *	Dublin	4	Patrick McCue	Albert G. Weston	Goughacres Stable (B. Frank Clyde & Thomas C. Clyde)	1 m	1:39.00	$2,305
1902 *	Highlander	3	Jack Martin	Thomas J. Healey	Richard T. Wilson Jr.	1 m	1:39.00	$2,305

- * Dead heat for first in 1902.
- † 1907 raced in fog, no time taken.
