= Annual Champion Stakes =

Defunct American thoroughbred horse race

- Class: Discontinued stakes
- Location: Sheepshead Bay Race Track; Brooklyn, New York, USA
- Inaugurated: 1900–1908
- Race type: Thoroughbred – Flat racing

Race information
- Distance: 2 1/4 miles (18 furlongs)
- Surface: Dirt
- Track: left-handed
- Qualification: Three-years-old and up
- Weight: 3yos: 116 lbs.; 4yos: 130 lbs; 5yos & up: 131 lbs.
- Purse: $25,000

The Annual Champion Stakes is a discontinued Thoroughbred horse race run from 1900 through 1908 that was the richest in the United States at the time for older horses with a guarantee purse of $25,000. Run on dirt over a distance of two and one-quarter miles at the Sheepshead Bay Race Track in Sheepshead Bay, Brooklyn, New York, the race was open to horses age three and older. The race was created to try to slow a decade-long trend to shorter distance races.

== Hart–Agnew Law ==
The Annual Champion Stakes was last run on September 12, 1908, and was won by King James. Earlier that year the Republican controlled New York Legislature under Governor Charles Evans Hughes passed the Hart–Agnew anti-betting legislation on June 11, 1908, with penalties allowing for fines and up to a year in prison. The owners of Sheepshead Bay Race Track, and other racing facilities in New York state, struggled to stay in business without wagering revenue. Racetrack operators had no choice but to drastically reduce the purse money being paid out which by 1909 saw many stakes races being canceled or offering a substantially reduced purse. Further restrictive legislation was passed by the New York Legislature in 1910 which deepened the financial crisis for track operators and led to a complete shutdown of racing across the state during 1911 and 1912. When a Court ruling saw racing return in 1913 it was too late for any revival of the Annual Champion Stakes as the Sheepshead Bay horse racing facility never reopened.

== Records ==
Speed record:

- 3:53 3/5 – Igniter (1903)

Most wins:

- no horse won this race more than once

Most wins by a jockey:

- no jockey won this race more than once

Most wins by a trainer:

- 2 – Matthew M. Allen (1902, 1906)
- 2 – John E. Madden (1907, 1908)

Most wins by an owner:

- no owner won this race more than once

== Winners ==
Year	Winner	Age	Jockey	Trainer	Owner	Dist. (Miles)	Time	Win US$
1908	King James	3	Carroll Shilling	John E. Madden	Sam Hildreth	2¼ M	4:01.00	$20,550
1907	Salvidere	3	Eddie Dugan	John E. Madden	Thomas Hitchcock Sr.	2¼ M	3:56.40	$20,550
1906	Accountant	3	Jack Martin	Matthew M. Allen	Diamond Jim Brady	2¼ M	3:55.40	$19,745
1905	Sysonby	3	David Nicol	James G. Rowe Sr.	James R. Keene	2¼ M	3:54.00	$20,550
1904	Stalwart	3	Arthur Redfern	William Shields	Edward R. Thomas	2¼ M	3:54.60	$19,650
1903	Igniter	4	Grover Fuller	Julius Bauer	Arthur Featherstone	2¼ M	3:53.60	$19,650
1902	Major Daingerfield	3	George M. Odom	Matthew M. Allen	McLewee & Co.	2¼ M	3:58.00	$19,650
1901	Maid of Harlem	5	Willie Simms	Barry D. Woods	Osceola Stables (Thomas L. Watt)	2¼ M	3:58.40	$19,650
1900	David Garrick	4	John Bullman	A. Jack Joyner	Rancocas Stable (Pierre Lorillard)	2¼ M	3:56.00	$19,650
