= Brighton Oaks =

- Class: Discontinued horse
- Location: Brighton Beach Race Course, Brighton Beach, Coney Island, New York, United States
- Inaugurated: 1901
- Race type: Thoroughbred - Flat racing

Race information
- Distance: 9 furlongs
- Surface: Dirt
- Track: left-handed
- Qualification: Three-year-old fillies
- Weight: Assigned
- Purse: $7,500

The Brighton Oaks was an American Thoroughbred horse race run at Brighton Beach Race Course in Brighton Beach, Coney Island, New York from 1901 through 1906. A race for three-year-old fillies, it was contested at various distances:

- 1 mile : 1902
- 1 mile 70 yards : 1903
- 1 1/16 miles : 1904
- 1 mile, 1 furlong : 1901, 1905–1906

== Records ==
Speed record: (at 1 mile, 1 furlong)

- 1:53.60 - Brookdale Nymph (1906)

Most wins by a jockey:

- 2 - Winfield O'Connor (1901, 1902)

Most wins by a trainer:

- 2 - Julius Bauer (1901, 1902)
- 2 - A. Jack Joyner (1904, 1905)

Most wins by an owner:

- 2 - Arthur Featherstone (1901, 1902)
- 2 - Sydney Paget (1904, 1905)

== Winners ==
Year	Winner	Jockey	Trainer	Owner	Time
1906	Brookdale Nymph	Lucien Lyne	John W. Rogers	Harry Payne Whitney	1:53.60
1905	Tradition	Willie Davis	A. Jack Joyner	Sydney Paget	1:56.40
1904	Hamburg Belle	Gene Hildebrand	A. Jack Joyner	Sydney Paget	1:47.80
1903	Birch Broom	Arthur Redfern	S. W. Street	James R. Keene	1:45.40
1902	Hatasoo	Winfield O'Connor	Julius Bauer	Arthur Featherstone	1:40.00
1901	Reina	Winfield O'Connor	Julius Bauer	Arthur Featherstone	1:54.20
