= Brighton Junior Stakes =

Discontinued Stakes
- Location: Brighton Beach Race Course, Brighton Beach, New York
- Inaugurated: 1900–1910
- Race type: Thoroughbred – Flat racing

Race information
- Distance: 6 furlongs (3/4 mile)
- Surface: Dirt
- Track: left-handed
- Qualification: Two-years-old

The Brighton Junior Stakes was an American Thoroughbred horse race first run on August 7, 1900 at Brighton Beach Race Course in Brighton Beach, Brooklyn, New York. A race for horses two year-olds, it was run on dirt over a distance of six furlongs.

The inaugural running of this race was won by Commando, a two time American Horse of the Year and a future U.S. Racing Hall of Fame inductee. Commando's son Colin won the Brighton Junior Stakes in 1907 and would go on to retire undefeated with fifteen wins. His 1907 performances were a major factor in his sire earning Leading sire in North America honors that year. Like Commando, Colin would also be a two time American Horse of the Year and a Hall of Fame inductee.

On June 11, 1908, the Republican controlled New York Legislature under Governor Charles Evans Hughes passed the Hart–Agnew anti-wagering bill. The owners of Brighton Beach Race Course and other racing facilities in New York State struggled to stay in business without wagering revenue. Racetrack owners had no choice but to drastically reduce the purse money being paid out which saw important stakes worth as little as twenty-five percent of what they were just two years earlier. Although the Brighton Junior Stakes had been scheduled for 1908, all stakes races were canceled at Brighton Beach Race Course and put on hiatus.

There was no Brighton Junior Stakes in 1908 and 1909 but the following year Empire City Race Track took over the race dates belonging to the Brighton Beach Race Course and in 1910 hosted the Brighton Junior Stakes. The race was won by Helene, a filly newly acquired by Frederick Herman Milden. However, further restrictive legislation was passed by the New York Legislature in 1910 which resulted in the deepening of the financial crisis for track operators and led to a complete shutdown of racing across the state during 1911 and 1912. When a Court ruling saw racing return in 1913 it was too late for the Brighton Beach facility and it never reopened.

== Records ==
Speed record:

- 1:12 1/5 – Colin (1907)

Most wins by a jockey:

- 2 – Henry Spencer (1900, 1901)
- 2 – Jack Martin (1904, 1905)
- 2 – Walter Miller (1906, 1907)

Most wins by a trainer:

- 3 – James G. Rowe Sr. (1900, 1904, 1907)

Most wins by an owner:

- 3 – James R. Keene (1900, 1904, 1907)

== Winners ==
Year	Winner	Jockey	Trainer	Owner	Dist. (Miles)	Time	Win$
1910	Helene	F. H. King	Frank D. Weir	Frederick Herman Milden	6 F	1:13.60	$2,275
1908	1909	No races held due to the Hart–Agnew Law					
1907	Colin	Walter Miller	James G. Rowe Sr.	James R. Keene	6 F	1:12.20	$11,750
1906	Salvidere	Walter Miller	John E. Madden	Thomas Hitchcock Sr.	6 F	1:13.60	$11,750
1905	Accountant	Jack Martin	Robert Tucker	Samuel S. Brown	6 F	1:14.80	$11,750
1904	Sysonby	Jack Martin	James G. Rowe Sr.	James R. Keene	6 F	1:13.00	$11,750
1903	James V.	William Shea	T. J. Healey	Michael Murphy	6 F	1:15.60	$10,550
1902	Hurstbourne	Arthur Redfern	Thomas Welsh	Julius Fleischmann	6 F	1:13.00	$7,550
1901	Alan-a-Dale	Henry Spencer	Thomas Clay McDowell	Thomas Clay McDowell	6 F	1:15.40	$7,550
1900	Commando	Henry Spencer	James G. Rowe Sr.	James R. Keene	6 F	1:13.20	$8,300
