= Morvich =

American-bred Thoroughbred racehorse

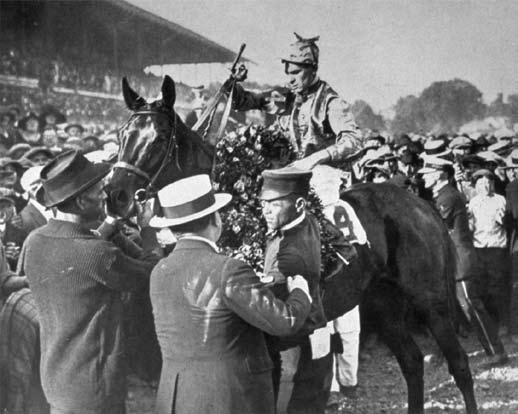
- Morvich after winning the 1922 Kentucky Derby
- Sire: Runnymede
- Grandsire: Voter
- Dam: Hymir
- Damsire: Dr. Leggo
- Sex: Stallion
- Foaled: 1919
- Country: United States
- Color: Brown
- Breeder: Adolph B. Spreckels
- Owner: Benjamin Block
- Trainer: Fred Burlew
- Record: 16: 12-2-1
- Earnings: $172,909

Major wins
- Eastern Shore Handicap (1921); United States Hotel Stakes (1921); Hopeful Stakes (1921); Pimlico Futurity (1921); Saratoga Special Stakes (1921) Triple Crown Race wins: Kentucky Derby (1922)

Awards
- American Champion Two-Year-Old Colt (1921)

Honors
- Morvich Handicap at Santa Anita Park
- Last updated on May 2, 2007

Morvich (April 23, 1919 – January 26, 1946) was an American Thoroughbred who was the first California-bred racehorse to win the Kentucky Derby.

Bred by sugar magnate Adolph B. Spreckels at his Napa Stock Farm, Morvich was sired by James R. Keene's stallion Runnymede and was out of the mare Hymir by Dr. Leggo. He was sold to Benjamin Block. The young colt was described as an "ugly cripple that no one thought could run until (trainer) Burlew proved them wrong."

== Racing career ==
Despite the predictions at the time, under future Hall of Fame trainer Fred Burlew, in 1921 Morvich had one of the best seasons in American racing history for a two-year-old. Beginning as a lowly selling plater, he rapidly moved up, winning all 11 of his starts, a feat that ranks close to the record of 13 consecutive wins set by Tremont in 1886. Dominating performances against the best horses in his age group made Morvich the runaway winner of American Champion Two-Year-Old Colt honors.

Although Morvich did not race in 1922 leading up to the Kentucky Derby, bettors made him the heavy favorite to win. Ridden by Albert Johnson, the colt earned his 12th straight victory. In an era when the U.S. Triple Crown races had not yet become the major event for three-year-olds, Morvich did not compete in the Preakness Stakes (which was run on the same day as the Kentucky Derby in 1922). Instead, his handlers sent him to New York City to compete in the Carlton Stakes where racing fans at Aqueduct Racetrack watched as Harry Payne Whitney's colt Whiskaway handed Morvich his first defeat. The colt's knees were the likely cause of his decline. Morvich had also developed osselets in one fetlock.

Morvich ended his 1922 campaign with the Derby his only victory in five starts. After finishing unplaced in the Fall Highweight Handicap at Aqueduct Racetrack, he was retired to stud, where he proved less than successful as a sire. His only offspring of note was Downy Pillow, a Churchill Downs Debutante Stakes winner.

His death effectively marked the extinction of the Hermit male-line in the United States.^{[1]}

== Pedigree ==
Pedigree of Morvich, brown colt, 1919
Sire Runnymede	Voter	Friar's Balsam	Hermit
Sire Runnymede	Voter	Friar's Balsam	Flower of Dorset
Sire Runnymede	Voter	Mavourneen	Barcaldine
Sire Runnymede	Voter	Mavourneen	Gaydene
Sire Runnymede	Running Stream	Domino	Himyar
Sire Runnymede	Running Stream	Domino	Mannie Gray
Sire Runnymede	Running Stream	Dancing Water	Isonomy
Sire Runnymede	Running Stream	Dancing Water	Pretty Dance
Dam Hymir	Dr. Leggo	Puryear D.	Deceiver
Dam Hymir	Dr. Leggo	Puryear D.	Ada D
Dam Hymir	Dr. Leggo	Sevens	Watercress
Dam Hymir	Dr. Leggo	Sevens	Folly
Dam Hymir	Georgia Girl	Solitaire	Ayrshire
Dam Hymir	Georgia Girl	Solitaire	Solesky
Dam Hymir	Georgia Girl	Georgia	Flambeau
Dam Hymir	Georgia Girl	Georgia	Goula (family: 1-o)

== See also ==
- List of leading Thoroughbred racehorses
