= Junior Champion Stakes (Gravesend) =

- Class: Discontinued stakes
- Location: Gravesend Race Track, Gravesend, New York, USA
- Inaugurated: 1898–1908
- Race type: Thoroughbred – Flat racing

Race information
- Distance: about 6 furlongs
- Surface: Dirt
- Track: left-handed
- Qualification: Two-years-old

The Junior Champion Stakes was a race for two-year-old Thoroughbred horses at Gravesend Race Track in Gravesend, on Coney Island, New York State. The September 18, 1909 edition of the Daily Racing Form stated that for a number of years it had been one of the East Coast's most important and valuable stakes for two-year-olds.

Among the race winners, Mesmerist was chosen the 1899 American Champion Two-Year-Old Male Horse as was Commando (1900), Highball (1903), Sysonby (1904) and Salvidere in 1906.

== Demise ==
In 1908, the administration of Republican Governor Charles Evans Hughes signed into law the Hart–Agnew bill that effectively banned all racetrack wagering in New York State. A 1910 amendment to the legislation added further restrictions that meant by 1911 all racetracks in the state ceased operations. Although the law was repealed in time to resume racing in 1913, the Gravesend Race Track never reopened.

In 1923, a new Junior Champion Stakes, later renamed the Cowdin Stakes, was inaugurated at Aqueduct Racetrack in South Ozone Park neighborhood in Queens, New York City.

== Records ==
Speed record:

- 1:09.00 at 6 F ± – Suffragette (1908)
- 1:13.80 at 6 F – Commando (1900)

Most wins by a jockey:

- 2 – Walter Miller (1906–1907)

Most wins by a trainer:

- 4 – James G. Rowe Sr. (1900, 1904, 1907, 1908)

Most wins by an owner:

- 3 – James R. Keene (1900, 1904, 1907)

== Winners ==
DRF history of the Junior Champion Stakes, 1898–1908

Year	Winner	Jockey	Trainer	Owner	Dist. (Furlong)	Time	Win$
1908	Suffragette	Joe Notter	James G. Rowe Sr.	James G. Rowe Sr.	6 F ±	1:09.00	$2,250
1907	Celt	Walter Miller	James G. Rowe Sr.	James R. Keene	6 F ±	1:10.00	$5,425
1906	Salvidere	Walter Miller	John E. Madden	Thomas Hitchcock Sr.	6 F ±	1:10.80	$13,475
1905	Pegasus	Lucien Lyne	John W. Rogers	Harry Payne Whitney	6 F ±	1:10.40	$11,775
1904	Sysonby	Arthur Redfern	James G. Rowe Sr.	James R. Keene	6 F ±	1:09.60	$6,010
1903	Highball	Grover Fuller	John W. May	Walter M. Shiftel & John W. May	6 F ±	1:10.40	$12,760
1902	Acefull	Harry Cochran	John E. Madden	William C. Whitney & Herman B. Duryea	6 F ±	1:09.40	$13,425
1901	Goldsmith	Nash Turner	John W. Rogers	William C. Whitney	6 F ±	1:11.20	$12,650
1900	Commando	Henry Spencer	James G. Rowe Sr.	James R. Keene	6 F	1:13.80	$10,510
1899	Mesmerist	Winfield O'Connor	Julius J. Bauer	Bromley & Co. (Joseph E. Bromley & Arthur Featherstone)	6 F	1:15.00	$18,320
1898	Armament	Danny Maher	Walter C. Rollins	Oneck Stable	6 F	1:14.25	$9,600
