= Motordrome =

Motordrome may refer to:

- Board track racing venues
- Wall of death
- Motordrome (album), a 2022 album by MØ

== Places in Australia ==
- Motordrome (Melbourne), a former sports venue

== Places in the United States ==
- Motordrome, California, a former streetcar stop and archaic placename in Los Angeles County
- Newark Motordrome in Newark, New Jersey
- Brighton Beach Motordrome in Brighton Beach, New York
