= Standard Stakes =

- Class: Discontinued stakes
- Location: Gravesend Race Track, Gravesend, New York, United States
- Inaugurated: 1901
- Race type: Thoroughbred – Flat racing

Race information
- Distance: 1 1/4 miles (10 furlongs)
- Surface: Dirt
- Track: left-handed
- Qualification: Three-year-olds & up, WFA

The Standard Stakes was a Thoroughbred horse race run annually from 1901 through 1908 at Gravesend Race Track in Gravesend, New York on Coney Island. A race for horses age three and older, the mile and a quarter event regularly drew some of the top horses of the day.

== Historical notes ==
In the 1901 inaugural only two horses ran after future Hall of Fame trainer Jack Joyner announced that Perry Belmont's Ethelbert would compete, leaving Richard Croker's Beau Gallant as the sole competition. A July 13, 1902 Daily Racing Form article stated that Ethelbert defeated Beau Gallant while "only cantering all the way" and adding that "Ethelbert is justly entitled to rank with some of the best handicap horses of the decade."

There was another strong field in the 1903 race won by Heno who defeated Africander, that year's American Champion Three-Year-Old Colt whose wins included the Belmont Stakes, Suburban Handicap and the Lawrence Realization Stakes. Third to Heno was Major Daingerfield who would win the 1904 edition of the Standard Stakes.

The 1905 Standard Stakes was won by the outstanding racemare Beldame. Recognized as the American Horse of the Year of 1904, she was a 1956 U.S. Hall of Fame inductee for whom the Beldame Stakes is named.

The three-year-old filly Whimsical won the 1906 Standard Stakes. She came into the race after she had won the May 22 Preakness Stakes at the Gravesend track, a victory which at that time made her the second filly to ever win that American Classic.

Future U.S. Hall of Fame inductee Peter Pan won the 1907 race and would be named American Champion Three-Year-Old Colt for that year, one in which he also won the Belmont Stakes.

The final running of the Standard Stakes took place on June 9, 1908 and was won for the second straight time by owner James R. Keene. This win came with Ballot who would be recognized as the American Champion Older Male Horse that year and again in 1910.

== The end of a race and of a racetrack ==
On June 11, 1908, the Republican controlled New York Legislature under Governor Charles Evans Hughes passed the Hart–Agnew anti-betting legislation. The owners of Gravesend Race Track, and other racing facilities in New York State, struggled to stay in business without income from betting. Racetrack operators had no choice but to drastically reduce the purse money being paid out or in some cases consolidating races with similar conditions which meant placing some races on what the owners hoped would be a short-lived hiatus.

In spite of strong opposition by prominent owners such as August Belmont Jr. and Harry Payne Whitney, reform legislators were not happy when they learned that betting was still going on at racetracks between individuals and they had further restrictive legislation passed by the New York Legislature in 1910. The Agnew–Perkins Law, a series of four bills and recorded as the Executive Liability Act, made it possible for racetrack owners and members of its board of directors to be fined and imprisoned if anyone was found betting, even privately, anywhere on their premises. After a 1911 amendment to the law that would limit the liability of owners and directors was defeated in the Legislature, every racetrack in New York State shut down. Owners, whose horses of racing age had nowhere to go, began sending them, their trainers and their jockeys to race in England and France. Many horses ended their racing careers there and a number remained to become an important part of the European horse breeding industry. Thoroughbred Times reported that more than 1,500 American horses were sent overseas between 1908 and 1913 and of them at least 24 were either past, present, or future Champions. When a February 21, 1913 ruling by the New York Supreme Court, Appellate Division saw horse racing return in 1913. However, it was too late for the Gravesend horse racing facility and it never reopened.

== Records ==
Speed record:

- 2:05.60 @ 11/4 miles – Peter Pan (1907) & Ballot (1908)
- 2:33.00 @ 11/2 miles – Heno (1903)

Most wins:

- No horse ever won this race more than once.

Most wins by a jockey:

- No jockey ever won this race more than once.

Most wins by a trainer:

- 2 – James G. Rowe Sr. (1907, 1908)

Most wins by an owner:

- 2 – James R. Keene (1907, 1908)

== Winners ==
Year	Winner	Age	Jockey	Trainer	Owner	Dist. (Miles)	Time	Win$
1908	Ballot	4	Joe Notter	James G. Rowe Sr.	James R. Keene	11/4	2:05.60	$4,925
1907	Peter Pan	3	George Mountain	James G. Rowe Sr.	James R. Keene	11/4	2:05.60	$5,300
1906	Whimsical	3	Leroy Williams	Tim J. Gaynor	Tim J. Gaynor	11/4	2:05.80	$5,075
1905	Beldame	4	Frank O'Neill	Fred Burlew	August Belmont Jr.	11/4	2:07.60	$4,850
1904	Major Daingerfield	5	Jack Martin	Thomas Welsh	William B. Leeds Sr.	11/4	2:10.00	$5,350
1903	Heno	4	Harry Michaels	William Lakeland	William S. Fanshawe	11/2	2:33.00	$2,925
1902	Advance Guard	5	Willie Shaw	Alexander Shields	James Carruthers / Alexander Shields	11/2	2:35.80	$2,530
1901	Ethelbert	5	Winfield O'Connor	A. Jack Joyner	Perry Belmont	11/2	2:36.00	$1,405
