= Voter (horse) =

Thoroughbred racehorse

- Sire: Friar's Balsam
- Grandsire: Hermit
- Dam: Mavourneen
- Damsire: Barcaldine
- Sex: Stallion
- Foaled: 1894
- Country: Great Britain
- Color: Chestnut
- Breeder: Foxhall P. Keene
- Owner: James R. & Foxhall P. Keene
- Trainer: Thomas Green; William Lakeland; James G. Rowe Sr.
- Record: 49: 26-6-7
- Earnings: US$34,217

Major wins
- Billow Stakes (1896); White Plains Handicap (1896); Winged Foot Handicap (1896); Coney Island Handicap (1897, 1900, 1901); Cyclone Handicap (1897); Metropolitan Handicap (1897); Jamaica Stakes (1900); Ocean Handicap (1900); Sea Cliff Stakes (1900); Test Handicap (1900); Toboggan Handicap (1900); Flight Handicap (1901)

Awards
- American Champion Older Male Horse (1899)

Voter (foaled 1894) was a Thoroughbred racehorse bred in England that competed in the United States where his racing success led to his selection as the American Champion Older Male Horse of 1899. When his racing career was over, Voter became an influential sire.

== Background ==
Voter was bred in England by American Foxhall Keene, the son of the very prominent American businessman and major owner and breeder of Thoroughbred horses, James R. Keene. Voter was brought to the United States as a yearling.

=== Track and World Records ===
On July 17, 1900, at Brighton Beach Race Course on Coney Island, New York, Voter set a new World Record of 1:38.00 for a mile on dirt.

Among his important stakes wins, Voter was a three-time winner of the Coney Island Handicap with his most important victory coming in the 1897 Metropolitan Handicap.

== At stud ==
When his racing career was over, Voter stood at his owner's Castleton Stud near Lexington, Kentucky. Some of his important offspring include:

- Ballot (foaled 1904) : twice American Champion Older Male Horse (1908, 1910). Damsire of 1928 Belmont Stakes winner Vito. Damsire of Bull Lea, a five-time Leading sire in North America and a four-time Leading broodmare sire in North America, considered "one of the greatest sires in Thoroughbred breeding history."
- Electioneer (foaled 1904) : undefeated at two, won eleven straight including the rich 1906 Futurity Stakes. American Champion Two-Year-Old Colt. Grandsire of Morvich, winner of the 1922 Kentucky Derby.
- Hilarious (foaled 1906) : won United States Hotel Stakes, Travers Stakes, Withers Stakes, Carlton Stakes, Tidal Stakes.
- The Manager (foaled 1909) : American Horse of the Year and American Champion Three-Year-Old Male Horse in 1912.
- Curiosity (foaled 1908) : dam of Novelty, American Champion Two-Year-Old Colt of 1910.
- Nightfall (foaled 1908) : dam of Campfire, 1916 American Champion Two-Year-Old Colt.
- Inaugural (foaled 1910) : dam of Whiskaway, the 1922 American Champion Three-Year-Old Male Horse.

== Sire line tree ==
- Voter
  - Ballot
    - Midway
      - Percentage
        - Three Bars
    - Chilhowee
  - Electioneer
  - Hilarious
  - Runnymede
    - Morvich
  - The Manager

== Pedigree ==
Pedigree of Voter, chestnut stallion, 1894
Sire Friar's Balsam	Hermit	Newminster	Touchstone*
Sire Friar's Balsam	Hermit	Newminster	Beeswing
Sire Friar's Balsam	Hermit	Seclusion	Tadmor
Sire Friar's Balsam	Hermit	Seclusion	Miss Sellon
Sire Friar's Balsam	Flower of Dorset	Breadalbane	Stockwell*
Sire Friar's Balsam	Flower of Dorset	Breadalbane	Blink Bonny
Sire Friar's Balsam	Flower of Dorset	Imperatrice	Orlando*
Sire Friar's Balsam	Flower of Dorset	Imperatrice	Eulogy
Dam Mavourneen	Barcaldine	Solon	West Australian
Dam Mavourneen	Barcaldine	Solon	Birdcatcher mare*
Dam Mavourneen	Barcaldine	Ballyroe	Belladrum
Dam Mavourneen	Barcaldine	Ballyroe	Bon Accord*
Dam Mavourneen	Gaydene	Albert Victor	Marsyas
Dam Mavourneen	Gaydene	Albert Victor	The Princess of Wales*
Dam Mavourneen	Gaydene	Flora Macdonald	Scottish Chief
Dam Mavourneen	Gaydene	Flora Macdonald	Mayflower (family: 1-g)

* Voter is inbred 4S x 5D x 5D to the stallion Stockwell, meaning that he appears fourth generation once on the sire side of his pedigree, and fifth generation twice (via Belladrum and The Princess Of Wales) on the dam side of his pedigree.

* Voter is inbred 4S x 5S to the stallion Touchstone, meaning that he appears fourth generation and fifth generation (via Orlando) on the sire side of his pedigree.

* Voter is inbred 4D x 5D to the mare Birdcatcher mare, meaning that she appears fourth generation and fifth generation (via Bon Acord) on the dam side of his pedigree.
