= Coney Island Handicap =

- Class: Discontinued stakes race
- Location: Sheepshead Bay Race Track, Sheepshead Bay, New York, United States
- Inaugurated: 1894
- Race type: Thoroughbred - Flat racing

Race information
- Distance: 5¾ F (1894 – 1895); 6 F (1896 – 1910); 6½ F (1909)
- Surface: Dirt
- Track: left-handed
- Qualification: Three-year-olds & up

The Coney Island Handicap was an American Thoroughbred horse race held annually from 1894 through 1910 at Sheepshead Bay Race Track in New York state. An event that always attracted a quality field, the conditions for entry allowed horses of either sex, aged three and older. Both the inaugural 1894 and the 1895 running's were on the track's Futurity Course at a distance of 5¾ furlongs after which it was moved to the main track and run at 6 furlongs each year thereafter except for 1909 when it was run at 6½ furlongs.

== Race Notes ==
While James R. Keene's Voter set the race record with three wins that came in 1897, 1900, and 1901, he only earned National Championship honors for 1899 when he would be recognized as the American Champion Older Male Horse.

For the Osceola Stable of Thomas L. Watt, Lady Uncas finished second in both the 1900 and 1902 editions of the Coney Island Handicap but then won the next two in 1903 and 1904.

== Demise ==
In 1908, the administration of Governor Charles Evans Hughes signed into law the Hart–Agnew bill that effectively banned all racetrack betting in the state of New York. The legislation allowed for fines and up to a year in prison which was strictly enforced. A 1910 amendment to the Hart–Agnew legislation added further restrictions that made the owners and directors of a racetrack personally liable for any betting done on their premises, with or without their consent. Such an onerous liability was intolerable and meant that by 1911 all racetracks in the state ceased operations. Although a February 21, 1913, ruling by the New York Supreme Court, Appellate Division paved the way for racing to resume that year, by then it was too late for horse racing at Sheepshead Bay Race Track and it went out of business.

== Records ==
Speed record:

- 1:12.00 @ 6 furlongs – Dreamer (1908)

Most wins:

- 3 - Voter (1897, 1900, 1901)

Most wins by a jockey:

- 2 - Henry Spencer (1900, 1901)

Most wins by a trainer:

- William Lakeland (1895, 1897)
- James G. Rowe Sr. (1900, 1901)
- Barry D. Woods (1903, 1904)

Most wins by an owner:

- 4 - James R. Keene (1895, 1897, 1900, 1901)

== Winners ==
Year	Winner	Age	Jockey	Trainer	Owner	Dist. (Miles)	Time	Win$
1910	Restigouche	5	Carroll H. Shilling	Sam Hildreth	Sam Hildreth	6 F	1:14.80	$1,470
1909	Lady Bedford	3	Eddie Dugan	John E. Madden	John E. Madden	6.5 F	1:19.00	$460
1908	Dreamer	6	Dalton McCarthy	John Huggins	Herman B. Duryea	6 F	1:12.00	$3,680
1907	Tony Faust	3	Carroll H. Shilling	Sam Hildreth	Sam Hildreth	6 F	1:13.80	$3,490
1906	King's Daughter	3	Jack Martin	John Gaines	Thomas Clay McDowell	6 F	1:12.40	$3,400
1905	Hamburg Belle	4	Willie Davis	A. Jack Joyner	Sidney Paget	6 F	1:12.60	$3,200
1904	Lady Uncas	7	Eddie Kunz	Barry D. Woods	Osceola Stable (Thomas L. Watt)	6 F	1:13.80	$3,630
1903	Lady Uncas	6	Arhur Redfern	Barry D. Woods	Osceola Stable (Thomas L. Watt)	6 F	1:17.00	$2,850
1902	Hatasoo	3	Winfield O'Connor	Julius J. Bauer	Arthur Featherstone	6 F	1:14.20	$1,450
1901	Voter	7	Henry Spencer	James G. Rowe Sr.	James R. Keene	6 F	1:12.40	$1,450
1900	Voter	6	Henry Spencer	James G. Rowe Sr.	James R. Keene	6 F	1:13.80	$1,450
1899	Bendoran	4	Nash Turner	Walter B. Jennings	Walter B. Jennings	6 F	1:13.40	$1,200
1898	Maceo	4	Isaac Burns Murphy	Byron McClelland	Sallie McClelland	6 F	1:15.40	$1,200
1897	Voter	3	Tod Sloan	William Lakeland	James R. Keene	6 F	1:14.75	$1,200
1896	Hanwell	4	Henry Griffin	Orson J. Decker	M. F. Stephenson	6 F	1:15.00	$1,200
1895	Domino	4	Fred Taral	William Lakeland	James R. Keene & Foxhall P. Keene	5.75 F	1:10.00	$1,200
1894	Armitage	3	Carter	John V. Elliott	Manhattan Stable	5.75 F	1:10.00	$1,500
