= Friar's Balsam (horse) =

British-bred Thoroughbred racehorse

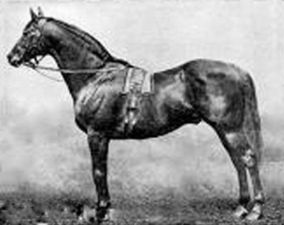
- Sire: Hermit
- Grandsire: Newminster
- Dam: Flower of Dorset
- Damsire: Breadalbane
- Sex: Stallion
- Foaled: 1885
- Country: Great Britain
- Colour: Chestnut
- Breeder: Henry Sturt, 1st Baron Alington
- Owner: Lord Alington; Sir Frederick Johnstone
- Trainer: John Porter

Major wins
- New Stakes (1887); July Stakes (1887); Richmond Stakes (1887); Middle Park Plate (1887); Dewhurst Plate (1887); Champion Stakes (1888)
- Last updated on 7 August 2012

Friar's Balsam (1885–1899) was an English Thoroughbred racehorse. He was the outstanding British two-year-old of 1887, when he was unbeaten in seven races. He was a sick horse when a beaten favourite in the following year's 2000 Guineas, but returned in the autumn to beat Minting in the Champion Stakes. Friar's Balsam was retired to stud where he had some success as a sire of winners. He was trained at Kingsclere by John Porter for Lord Alington and Sir Frederick Johnstone.

== Breeding ==
Friar's Balsam was a chestnut colt foaled in 1885. His conformation was not perfect, as he was described as being "very much over at the knee". Friar's Balsam's sire was The Derby winner Hermit. His dam, Flower of Dorset, was sired by Breadalbane out of the 1862 Park Hill Stakes winner Imperatrice, the founder of Thoroughbred family 2-k.

== Racing career ==
=== 1887: two-year-old season ===
Friar's Balsam began his racing career in the New Stakes at Ascot. In a field of seven that included Seabreeze and Ayrshire he won easily. After this race his owners Alington and Johnston refused an offer of £10,000 for him. He followed the New Stakes up with a win in the Hurstborne Stakes at Stockbridge. His next start came in the July Stakes, where he beat Seabreeze by ¾ length. His registered his fourth successive win in the Richmond Stakes at Goodwood, carrying a ten-pound weight penalty. At the same meeting he also won the Molecombe Stakes in a walkover. After a break won the Middle Park Plate beating a field that again included Seabreeze. His seventh and final start of the season came in the Dewhurst Plate, where he won carrying a ten-pound penalty.

=== 1888: three-year-old season ===
Friar's Balsam had been the favourite for the 2000 Guineas and Epsom Derby throughout the winter and spring. A small field of six went to post for the 2000 Guineas. Ridden by Tom Cannon, Friar's Balsam was the 1/3 favourite, Ayrshire was at 100/12 and Orbit was 100/8. Friar's Balsam began near the rear, but he never came to the front and was in trouble a long way from the finish. He eventually finished fifth, with Ayrshire winning easily by two lengths. He had looked beaten only a quarter of a mile into the race and it was later found that an abscess in his mouth had burst in the opening stages. He was then taken out of the Derby.

His first race back after the 2000 Guineas was the Lancashire Plate, where he finished unplaced and the race was won by Seabreeze. He started the Champion Stakes at Newmarket in a field that included Minting. Minting started favourite the 60/100 favourite, with Friar's Balsam at 5/2. After the start he settled in third place of the six runners. In the closing stages Friar's Balsam and Minting drew rapidly clear of the others before they had even been asked for an effort. With Friar's Balsam in a slight lead Minting tried to close, but could not and Friar's Balsam beat him by half a length without being extended, the two being well clear of the rest.

=== 1889: four-year-old season ===
At the end of the 1888 season Friar's Balsam underwent an operation. His only run as a four-year-old was in the Royal Stakes at Kempton Park, where he finished unplaced behind Ayrshire.

== Stud record ==
At stud Friar's Balsam sired Balsamo who won the valuable City and Suburban Handicap. He also sired Mother Siegel who was the dam of 2000 Guineas and Epsom Derby winner Minoru. Another of his daughters, Grand Marnier, was the grandam of the Derby winner Grand Parade. Friar's Balsam's son Voter became a leading racehorse in North America, winning the Metropolitan Handicap. Voter in turn sired Ballot, who was rated the best older horse in America in 1908 and 1910. Friar's Balsam died in 1899 at the age of fourteen.

== Sire line tree ==
- Friar's Balsam
  - Balsamo
  - Voter
    - Ballot
      - Midway
        - Percentage
      - Chilhowee
    - Electioneer
    - Hilarious
    - Runnymede
      - Morvich
    - The Manager

== Pedigree ==
Pedigree of Friar's Balsam (GB), chestnut stallion, 1885
Sire Hermit (GB) ch. 1864	Newminster b. 1848	Touchstone* br. 1831	Camel*
Sire Hermit (GB) ch. 1864	Newminster b. 1848	Touchstone* br. 1831	Banter*
Sire Hermit (GB) ch. 1864	Newminster b. 1848	Beeswing b. 1833	Doctor Syntax
Sire Hermit (GB) ch. 1864	Newminster b. 1848	Beeswing b. 1833	Ardrossan mare
Sire Hermit (GB) ch. 1864	Seclusion b. 1857	Tadmor br. 1846	Ion
Sire Hermit (GB) ch. 1864	Seclusion b. 1857	Tadmor br. 1846	Palmyra
Sire Hermit (GB) ch. 1864	Seclusion b. 1857	Miss Sellon b. 1851	Cowl
Sire Hermit (GB) ch. 1864	Seclusion b. 1857	Miss Sellon b. 1851	Belle Dame
Dam Flower of Dorset (GB) b. 1870	Breadalbane ch. 1862	Stockwell ch. 1849	The Baron
Dam Flower of Dorset (GB) b. 1870	Breadalbane ch. 1862	Stockwell ch. 1849	Pocahontas
Dam Flower of Dorset (GB) b. 1870	Breadalbane ch. 1862	Blink Bonny b. 1854	Melbourne
Dam Flower of Dorset (GB) b. 1870	Breadalbane ch. 1862	Blink Bonny b. 1854	Queen Mary
Dam Flower of Dorset (GB) b. 1870	Imperatrice b. 1859	Orlando b. 1841	Touchstone*
Dam Flower of Dorset (GB) b. 1870	Imperatrice b. 1859	Orlando b. 1841	Vulture
Dam Flower of Dorset (GB) b. 1870	Imperatrice b. 1859	Eulogy b. 1843	Euclid
Dam Flower of Dorset (GB) b. 1870	Imperatrice b. 1859	Eulogy b. 1843	Martha Lynn

Note: b. = Bay, br. = Brown, ch. = Chestnut

* Friar's Balsam is inbred 3S x 4D to the stallion Touchstone, meaning that he appears third generation on the sire side of his pedigree, and fourth generation on the dam side of his pedigree.
