= Sysonby (horse) =

American-bred Thoroughbred racehorse

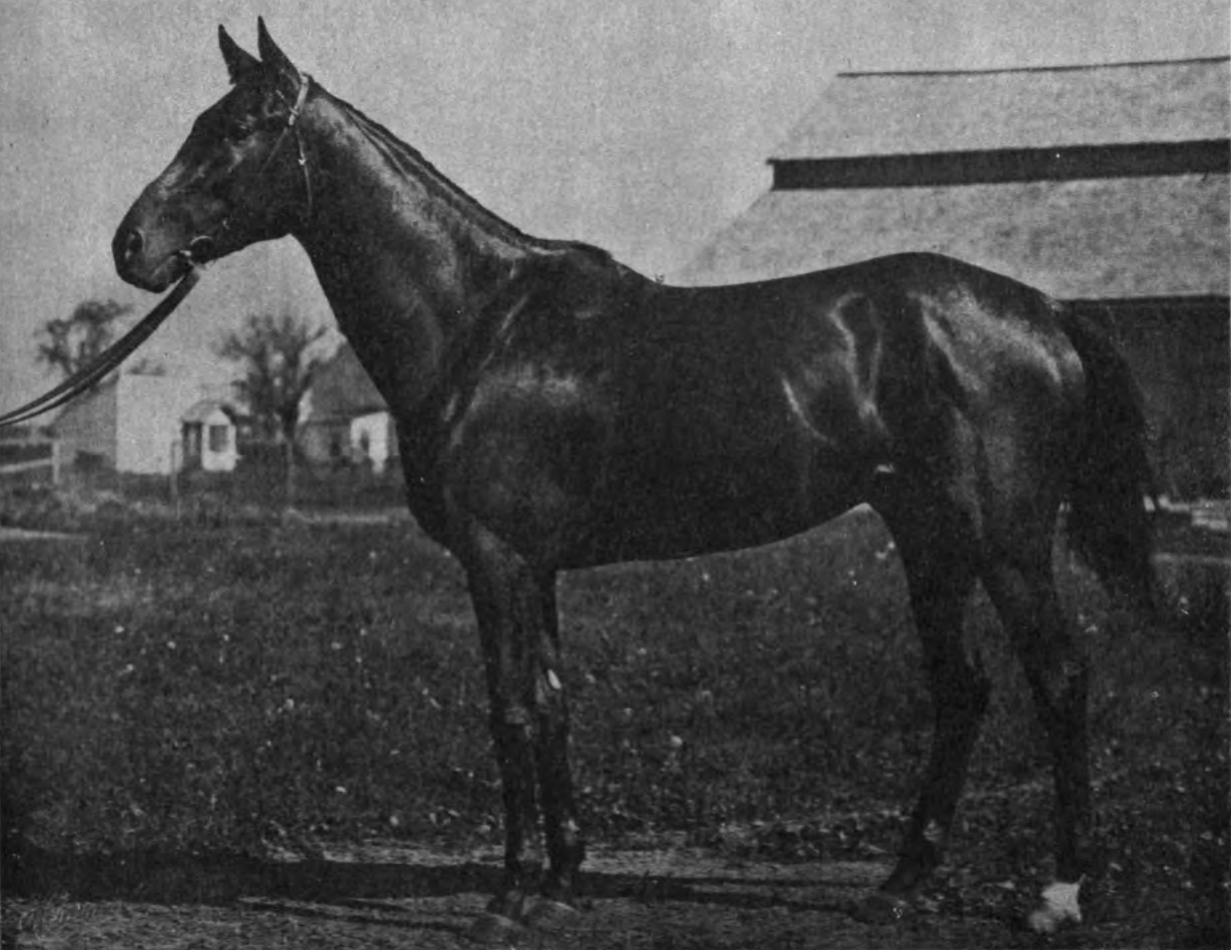
- From Thoroughbred Types, 1900-1925
- Sire: Melton (GB)
- Grandsire: Master Kildare
- Dam: Optime (GB)
- Damsire: Orme
- Sex: Stallion
- Foaled: 1902
- Country: United States
- Colour: Bay
- Breeder: Marcus Daly
- Owner: James R. Keene
- Trainer: James G. Rowe Sr.
- Record: 15: 14-0-1
- Earnings: $184,438

Major wins
- Brighton Junior Stakes (1904); Flash Stakes (1904); Saratoga Special Stakes (1904); Annual Champion Stakes (1905); Brighton Derby (1905); Century Stakes (1905); Commonwealth Handicap (1905); Great Republic Stakes (1905); Iroquois Stakes (1905); Metropolitan Handicap (1905); Lawrence Realization Stakes (1905); Tidal Stakes (1905)

Honours
- United States Racing Hall of Fame (1956) #30 - Top 100 U.S. Racehorses of the 20th Century; Sysonby Handicap at Belmont Park
- Last updated on October 2, 2006

Sysonby (1902–1906) was an American Thoroughbred racehorse. He won every start easily, except one, at distances from one mile to two and a quarter miles. His superiority as a two and three-year-old was unchallenged during his short career of 15 race starts.

== Background ==
Foaled in Kentucky, Sysonby was a bay son of the 1885 Epsom Derby winner, Melton, out of the English mare Optime by Orme (by the undefeated Ormonde). The mating of Melton and Optime was arranged by Marcus Daly, who was involved with the Anaconda Copper Mine. Daly died before Optime, stabled in England, foaled. His stock, including the still pregnant Optime, was brought to New York to be auctioned. James R. Keene purchased Optime for $6,600, sending her to his Castleton Stud in Kentucky, which he rarely visited.

Apparently Optime's foal, observed in his paddock, was anything but inspiring. Considered unattractive and small, as well as slow, young Sysonby was to be sent back to England for sale. But Keene's trainer, the well-regarded James G. Rowe Sr., had seen Sysonby in action during some early trials. When it was time for the yearlings to be sent away, Rowe, a leading trainer who had once been a leading jockey (guiding Harry Bassett to his Saratoga Cup win amongst many other successes), covered Sysonby in blankets, convincing Keene he was too ill to make the long ocean journey.

== Name ==
Sysonby is a hamlet near Melton Mowbray in Leicestershire, England.

== Racing career ==
In the care of Rowe, Sysonby won everything Rowe entered him in by sizable margins, with the exception of the Futurity Stakes (USA), where he came in an unaccountable third, beaten by the filly Tradition and the filly Artful. Artful ranked 94th in the top 100 U.S. Thoroughbred champions of the 20th century by Blood-Horse magazine). Rowe saw Sysonby's groom exhibiting a large sum of money, and the groom admitted he'd been bribed to drug Sysonby before the race.

If not drugged, nothing beat Sysonby. The turf writer Neil Newman ranked Sysonby as one of the three best colts he'd ever seen. The other two were Colin (also trained by Rowe) and Man o' War.

Sysonby was the top money earner of 1905. Average winning margin was 4 ¼ lengths. Was ahead at every point of every race, except at the quarter call in the Brighton Junior Stakes, and in the stretch of the Futurity.

Race Record: 15-14-0-1. Career Earnings: $184,438
Date	Track	Race	Distance (Furlongs)	Finish Position	Margin (lengths)	Chart Comment	Notes
7-14-1904	Brighton Beach	Maiden Special	5 ½	1	6	"Under restraint"	
7-16-1904	Brighton Beach	Brighton Junior Stakes	6	1	4	"Away last, under a pull"	
8-1-1904	Saratoga	Flash Stakes	5 ½	1	6	"Easing up"	4 horse field
8-6-1904	Saratoga	Saratoga Special	5 ½	1	6	"Easily"	3 horse field
8-27-1904	Sheepshead Bay	Futurity Stakes	6	3	5	"Broke sideways, slow into stride"	Run on Sheepshead's "Futurity course" Winner was Artful
9-19-1904	Gravesend	Junior Champion Stakes	6 (about)	1	3	"Easing up"	Carried 10lbs more than second place
5-5-1905	Belmont Park	Met Mile	8	1	5	"Hand ridden"	Dead heat with Race King
6-17-1905	Sheepshead Bay	Tidal Stakes	10	1	5	"Easily"	4 horse field Second place horse was Agile
7-1-1905	Sheepshead Bay	Commonwealth Handicap	10	1	4	"Kicked at post"	Track: Sloppy
7-4-1905	Sheepshead Bay	Lawrence Realization	13	1	5	"Easing up"	4 horse field Second place was Tanya
7-20-1905	Brighton Beach	Iroquois Stakes	10	1	1 ½	"Easily"	3 horse field
7-29-1905	Brighton Beach	Brighton Derby	12	1	5	"Easing up"	3 horse field Second place horse was Agile
8-12-1905	Saratoga	Great Republic Stakes	10	1	3	"Away slowly"	Track: Good
9-2-1905	Sheepshead Bay	Century Stakes	10	1	2	"Very easily"	Track: Good 4 horse field Second place horse was Broomstick
9-91905	Sheepshead Bay	Annual Champion Stakes	18	1	4	"With ease"	3 horse field

== Death ==
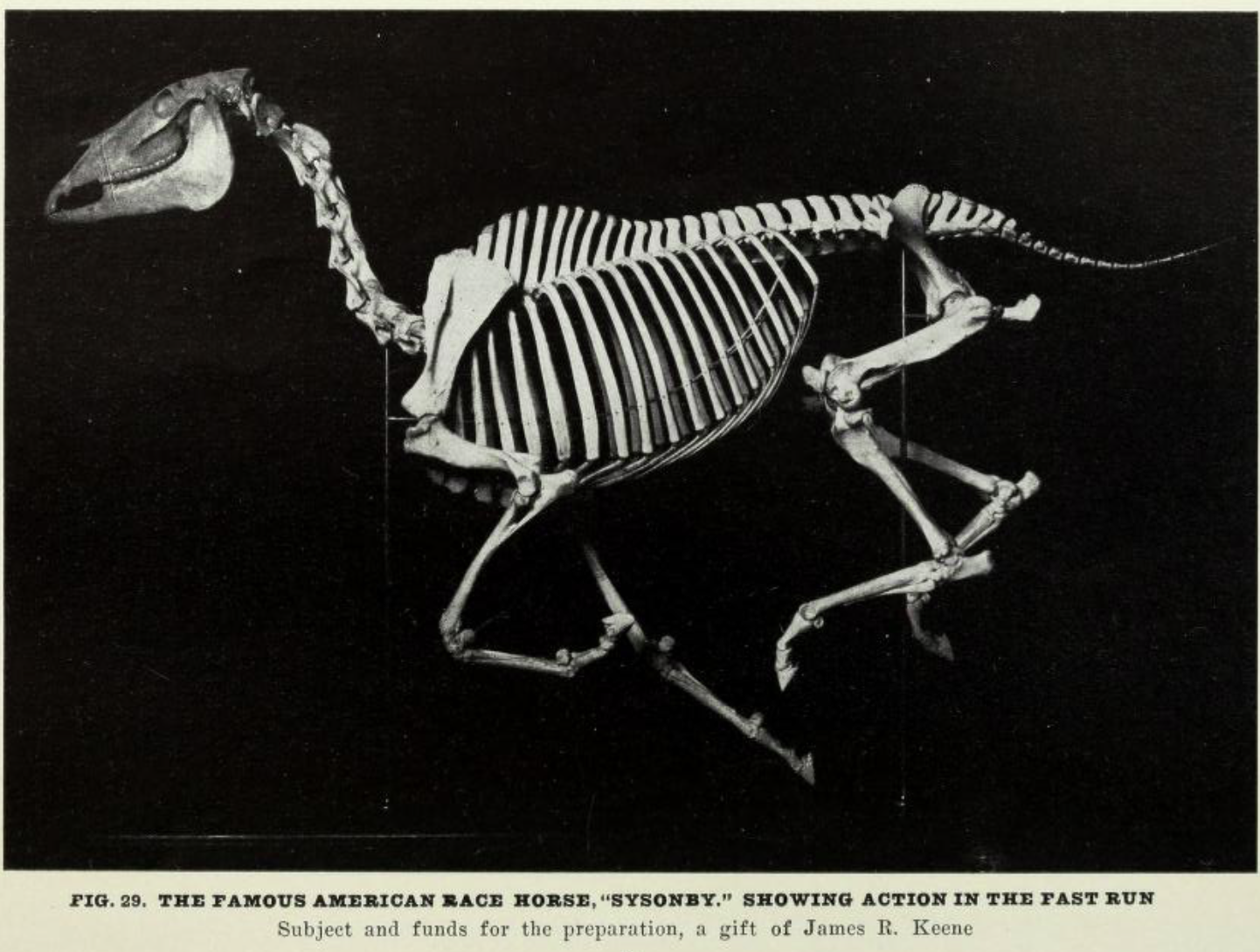
Sysonby's skeleton

At four years and four months of age, Sysonby died. He had broken out with bloody sores all over his body, having contracted a serious disease called variola, and it proved fatal. Sysonby died on June 17, 1906, in his stall at Sheepshead Bay from sepsis brought on by an illness consisting of multiple skin lesions, fever and profound muscle wasting, now thought to be variola. After his death, his owner Keene donated his remains to New York City's American Museum of Natural History to become part of the Chubb series of skeletons as studies in anatomy and locomotion. Sysonby was in the storage area of the Museum with other horses of the Chubb Collection. These other horses include, General Philip Sheridan's American Civil War steed, Winchester, General Robert E. Lee's Traveller, Comanche ( the sole survivor of the Battle of the Little Big Horn), and Roy Rogers' Trigger.

== Honors ==
Sysonby was inducted into the National Museum of Racing and Hall of Fame in Saratoga Springs, New York, in 1956. In the list of the top 100 U.S. Thoroughbred champions of the 20th Century by Blood-Horse magazine, he ranks 30th.

Eighteen years after Sysonby's death, a December 11, 1924 Daily Racing Form article looking back on his racing career, called Sysonby "One of Greatest Race Horses in History of the American Turf".

James Rowe Sr. was also inducted posthumously into the Hall of Fame as a trainer.

== See also ==
- List of leading Thoroughbred racehorses
