= Colin (horse) =

American-bred Thoroughbred racehorse

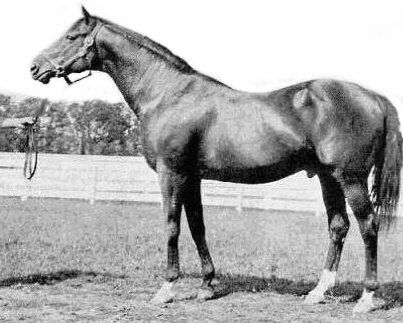
- Sire: Commando
- Grandsire: Domino
- Dam: Pastorella
- Damsire: Springfield
- Sex: Stallion
- Foaled: 1905
- Country: United States
- Color: Brown
- Breeder: Castleton Stud
- Owner: James R. Keene
- Trainer: James G. Rowe Sr.
- Record: 15:15–0–0
- Earnings: $180,912

Major wins
- National Stallion Stakes (1907); Great Trial Stakes (1907); Champagne Stakes (1907); Brighton Junior Stakes (1907); Saratoga Special Stakes (1907); Grand Union Hotel Stakes (1907); Futurity Stakes (1907); Matron Stakes, colts' div. (1907); Flatbush Stakes (1907); Eclipse Stakes (1907); Produce Stakes colts' div. (1907); Withers Stakes (1908); Belmont Stakes (1908); Tidal Stakes (1908)

Awards
- American Champion Two-Year-Old Male Horse (1907); American Horse of the Year (1907, 1908); American Champion 3-Year-Old Male Horse (1908)

Honors
- United States Racing Hall of Fame (1956) #15 - Top 100 U.S. Racehorses of the 20th Century
- Last updated on 20 August 2009

Colin (1905 – 1932) was an undefeated champion American Thoroughbred racehorse who won all 15 of his races, including the 1908 Belmont Stakes. He was the 1907 and 1908 Horse of the Year as well as the 1907 Champion Two-Year-Old Male and 1908 Champion 3-Year-Old Male and was inducted into the National Museum of Racing and Hall of Fame.

In 1907, he swept the major two-year-old stakes races including the Belmont Futurity and Champagne Stakes and was the consensus Horse of the Year. His three-year-old campaign was cut short by injury but he was still Horse of the Year based on his three wins including the Belmont Stakes. As a sire, he suffered from fertility problems but still sired multiple stakes winners.

Colin was inducted into the National Museum of Racing and Hall of Fame in 1956. In the Blood-Horse magazine List of the Top 100 Racehorses of the 20th Century, he was ranked number 15.

== Background ==
Colin was a brown stallion with one white sock, one pastern, one partial fetlock, and a blaze and snip on his face. He was foaled in 1905 at Castleton Stud in Kentucky and was owned by London-born financier James R. Keene. Colin was from the third crop of foals by the stakes winner and leading sire Commando (by Domino), who had been bred by James Keene. Colin's dam was the English stakes-winning Pastorella (GB), by Springfield. She had been imported to the US by Marcus Daly and was purchased by Keene in 1901.

== Racing career ==
Colin was trained by Hall of Fame inductee James G. Rowe Sr. Rowe had handled many top horses in his long career, including Sysonby, Hindoo (who was never unplaced), and the first filly to win the Kentucky Derby, Regret. Rowe and his horses Miss Woodford, Luke Blackburn, Whisk Broom II, Commando, and Peter Pan were inducted into the Hall of Fame.

James Keene was not initially enthusiastic about Colin, noting his disfiguring curb, or thoroughpin, meaning that the colt had an enlarged hock. He'd been just as disdainful of an earlier purchase: Colin's grandsire Domino, (another eventual Horse of the Year in 1893 and Hall of Famer), but his son, Foxhall Keene, bought Domino anyway.

A friend of Keene's, De Courcey Forbes, always named the Castleton foals. Colin was for "Poor Colin", a pastoral poem by the English poet laureate Nicholas Rowe, thus connecting the name of Colin's dam and the name of his trainer, who took a keen interest in his horses. A hands-on trainer, Rowe was famous for the personal attention he paid to his horses. He literally traveled in the same railroad car with them. Aware that Colin's swollen hock would give him trouble, Rowe attended to it with massages and cold water baths.

Consistently rated as one of the best horses in American racing history, and a celebrity with both fans and horsemen, Colin started fifteen times in his two-year career and never lost. Twelve of these races came when he was a two-year-old. In an age that valued stamina and maturity, Colin was still viewed with awe by the horsemen of his time. Sportswriter Abram Hewitt said, "The blood surges, and the pulses quicken at the very sight of such Olympians on the track." Hewitt had "listened to old-time horsemen talk about Colin with an other-world expression on their faces." Colin would earn National Champion honors as the American Horse of the Year for 1907 and 1908. He was also America's Champion Three-Year-Old Male in 1908.

Colin's last victory came on June 20, 1908, in the Tidal Stakes at Sheepshead Bay, after which he was sent to England to race, but was pulled up lame in a workout and was retired.

Undefeated, 15 for 15. Track fast unless otherwise noted. Favorite in every race.
Date	Track	Race	Distance (Furlong)	Win Margin (lengths)	Chart comments	Notes
5-29-1907	Belmont Park	Maiden Special	5	2	"Easily"	Straight course Track: good
6-1-1907	Belmont Park	National Stallion Stakes	5	3	"Never threatened"	Straight course New track record, :58
6-5-1907	Belmont Park	Eclipse Stakes	5 1/2	head	"Under pressure, gamely"	Straight course Track: muddy
6-29-1907	Sheepshead Bay	Great Trial Stakes	6	2	"Mild restraint"	Futurity course Track: slow
6-27-1907	Brighton Beach	Brighton Junior Stakes	6	1 1/2	"repelled stretch challenge"	
8-10-1907	Saratoga	Saratoga Special	6	1	"Decisively"	
8-14-1907	Saratoga	Grand Union Hotel Stakes	6	2	"Hard held"	
8-31-1907	Sheepshead Bay	Futurity Stakes	6	1 1/2	"Blocked, as rider pleased"	Futurity course New stakes record: 1:11 1/5
9-7-1907	Sheepshead Bay	Flatbush Stakes	7	3	"Hard held"	Futurity course
9-30-1907	Brighton Beach	Produce Stakes	6	5	"Eased up"	Track: muddy vs. Fair Play
10-7-1907	Belmont Park	Matron Stakes	6	3	"Easing up"	Straight course vs. Fair Play
10-16-1907	Belmont Park	Champagne Stakes	7	6	"Drawing away"	Straight course
5-23-1908	Belmont Park	Withers Stakes	8	2	"Eased up"	Track: heavy vs. Fair Play
5-30-1908	Belmont Park	Belmont Stakes	11	head	"Eased up"	Track: sloppy vs. Fair Play Rainstorm, no time taken
6-20-1908	Sheepshead Bay	Tidal Stakes	10	2	"Bore out, tiring slightly"	

== Stud record ==
Colin stood his first season in 1909 at Heath Stud, near Newmarket, England, for a fee of 98 guineas. He was neglected by the English breeders due to his American bloodlines. First in England, and then back in Kentucky after Keene died, Colin was plagued by infertility problems. In c. 1913, Colin was purchased for $30,000 by Wickliffe Stud, where he stood until the stud was dispersed in January 1918. Edward B. McLean then purchased the 13-year-old Colin for $5,100 to stand at his Belray Farm, near Middleburg, Virginia. He sired 11 stakes winners out of 81 foals in 23 seasons at stud, which translates into 14% of his get. His best galloper was Jock (1924 from Kathleen by *Sempronius; 17 wins and $95,255). His son Neddie was the paternal grandsire of Alsab. Another was On Watch, the broodmare sire Stymie.

Colin died in 1932 at the age of twenty-seven on Belray Farm near Middleburg, Virginia. His lifetime earnings amounted to $180,912.

Kent Hollingsworth admired Colin's career as a racehorse and observed the horse's potential in his book, The Great Ones. He said, "Great horses have been beaten by mischance, racing luck, injury and lesser horses running the race of their lives. None of these, however, took Colin. He was unbeatable."

== Honors ==
Colin was inducted into the National Museum of Racing and Hall of Fame in 1956. In The Blood-Horse magazine ranking of the top 100 U.S. thoroughbred champions of the 20th Century, he was ranked #15. It was eighty years before another horse, Personal Ensign, retired unbeaten in America.

== Sire line tree ==
- Colin
  - Gentle Shepherd
  - On Watch
    - Sortie
      - Magic Hour
    - Tick On
    - Observant
    - Time Clock
    - Brazado
      - Flash Burn
      - Curandero
        - Inclusive
  - Jock
  - Neddie
    - Good Goods
      - Alsab
        - Armageddon
        - Subahdar
    - Nedayr
    - Neds Flying

== Pedigree ==
Pedigree of Colin, Br.h. 1905
Sire Commando Bay 1898	Domino; Bay 1891	Himyar	Alarm
Sire Commando Bay 1898	Domino; Bay 1891	Himyar	Hira
Sire Commando Bay 1898	Domino; Bay 1891	Mannie Gray	Enquirer
Sire Commando Bay 1898	Domino; Bay 1891	Mannie Gray	Lizzie G
Sire Commando Bay 1898	Emma C Bay 1892	Darebin	The Peer
Sire Commando Bay 1898	Emma C Bay 1892	Darebin	Lurline
Sire Commando Bay 1898	Emma C Bay 1892	Guenn	Flood
Sire Commando Bay 1898	Emma C Bay 1892	Guenn	Glendew
Dam Pastorella Chestnut 1892	Springfield; Bay 1873	St Albans	Stockwell
Dam Pastorella Chestnut 1892	Springfield; Bay 1873	St Albans	Bribery
Dam Pastorella Chestnut 1892	Springfield; Bay 1873	Viridis	Marsyas
Dam Pastorella Chestnut 1892	Springfield; Bay 1873	Viridis	Maid of Palmyra
Dam Pastorella Chestnut 1892	Griselda; Gr. 1878	Strathconan	Newminster
Dam Pastorella Chestnut 1892	Griselda; Gr. 1878	Strathconan	Souvenir
Dam Pastorella Chestnut 1892	Griselda; Gr. 1878	Perseverance	Voltigeur
Dam Pastorella Chestnut 1892	Griselda; Gr. 1878	Perseverance	Spinster (Family: 19-b)

== See also ==
- List of leading Thoroughbred racehorses
