= André Grapperon =

French motorcycle racer

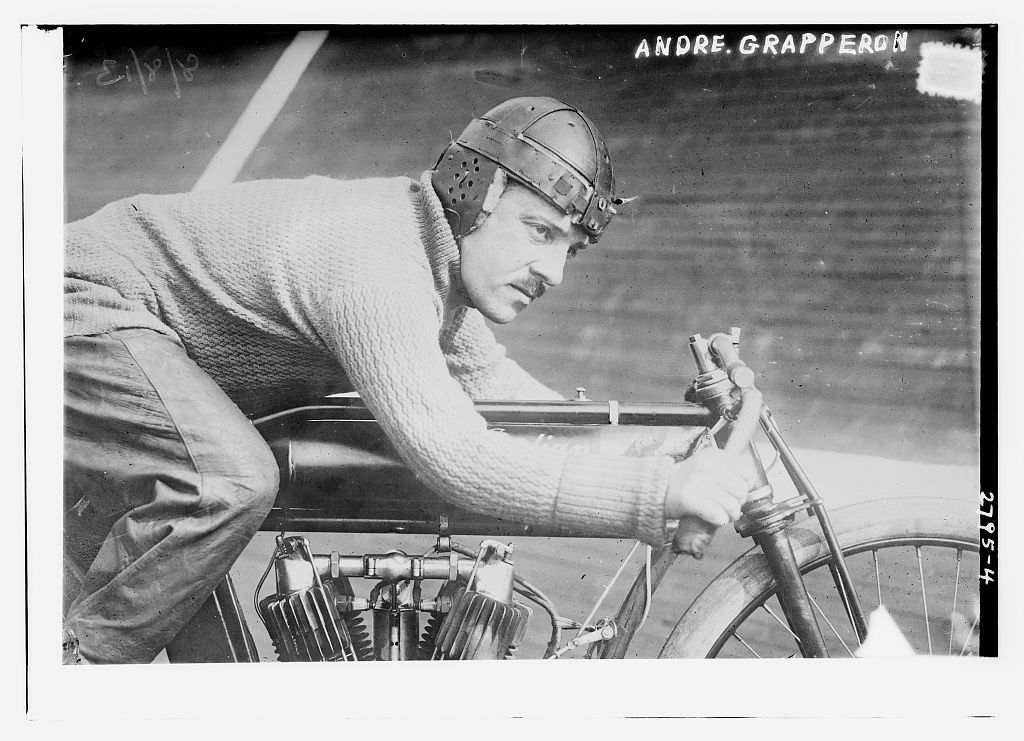
- Grapperon c. 1913
- Occupation: Motorcycle racer

André Grapperon was a French champion motorcycle racer at the start of the 20th century. He was French champion, and also raced in England and the United States at the dawn of motorcycle competition. He was hired by Indian to race in England in 1902, and raced for Indian in the United States at Brighton Beach Motordrome, losing to Arthur Chapple of New York, who also rode an Indian.
