= Whimsical (horse) =

American-bred Thoroughbred racehorse

- Sire: Orlando
- Grandsire: Orme
- Dam: Kismet
- Damsire: Hindoo
- Sex: Filly
- Foaled: 1903
- Country: United States
- Colour: Chestnut
- Breeder: Raceland Farm (Catesby Woodford)
- Owner: Tim J. Gaynor; Matthew Looram & Mr. Biddle
- Trainer: Tim J. Gaynor; Frank D. Weir
- Record: 16:7-6-2
- Earnings: $27,895

Major wins
- Belles Stakes (1905); Golden Rod Stakes (1905); Standard Stakes (1906) American Classics wins: Preakness Stakes (1906)
- Last updated on August 13, 2019

Whimsical (foaled 1903 at Catesby Woodford's Raceland Farm near Paris, Kentucky) was an American Thoroughbred racehorse. She is best known as the second filly to ever win the Preakness Stakes.

== Background ==
Whimsical was sired by Orlando, out of the mare, Kismet, who was sired by United States Racing Hall of Fame stallion, Hindoo.

== Racing career ==
As a two-year-old Whimsical won the Belles Stakes and Golden Rod Stakes at Sheepshead Bay and finished second when racing against colts in the Champagne Stakes. At age three she won the Standard Stakes at Gravesend in which she defeated 1905 Preakness Stakes winner Cairngorm and 1905 Futurity Stakes winner Ormondale. In the Preakness Stakes she led from the start and won easily in a time of 1:45 by 4 lengths over Content and Larabie. In this period, the race was held at Gravesend Race Track on Coney Island, New York.

Owner Tim Gaynor sold Whimsical to the partnership of Matthew Looram and a Mr. Biddle. The new owners maintained Gaynor as Whimsical's trainer until late August 1907 when they replaced him with Frank Weir.

== Retirement ==
Whimsical was retired to Brookdale Farm to become a broodmare in 1908.

=== Progeny ===
- Unnamed, foaled in 1909- black filly sired by Hamburg.
- Tears and Smiles, foaled in 1911- chestnut colt sired by Broomstick. Exported to race in England in 1913.
- Whimsy, foaled 1913- brown gelding sired by Burgomaster. Won four races in 20 starts.
- Kultur, foaled in 1914- brown gelding sired by Burgomaster. Kultur raced for Harry Payne Whitney and was euthanised 8 January 1922 after breaking a leg.

== Honours ==
The Whimsical Stakes at Pimlico Race Course is a 6 furlong race named for her and is raced on Preakness weekend.

== Pedigree ==
Pedigree of Whimsical (USA), chestnut mare, 1905
Sire Orlando (GB) 1899	Orme (GB); 1889	Ormonde	Bend Or
Sire Orlando (GB) 1899	Orme (GB); 1889	Ormonde	Lily Agnes
Sire Orlando (GB) 1899	Orme (GB); 1889	Angelica	Galopin
Sire Orlando (GB) 1899	Orme (GB); 1889	Angelica	St Angela
Sire Orlando (GB) 1899	Huelva (GB); 1890	Herald	Laneret
Sire Orlando (GB) 1899	Huelva (GB); 1890	Herald	Nightjar
Sire Orlando (GB) 1899	Huelva (GB); 1890	Infanta	Pero Gomez
Sire Orlando (GB) 1899	Huelva (GB); 1890	Infanta	Nightingale
Dam Kismet (USA) 1892	Hindoo (USA); 1878	Virgil	Vandal
Dam Kismet (USA) 1892	Hindoo (USA); 1878	Virgil	Hymenia
Dam Kismet (USA) 1892	Hindoo (USA); 1878	Florence	Lexington
Dam Kismet (USA) 1892	Hindoo (USA); 1878	Florence	Weatherwitch (GB)
Dam Kismet (USA) 1892	Roselle (GB); 1883	Rosicrucian	Beadsman
Dam Kismet (USA) 1892	Roselle (GB); 1883	Rosicrucian	Madame Eglentine
Dam Kismet (USA) 1892	Roselle (GB); 1883	May Queen	Claret
Dam Kismet (USA) 1892	Roselle (GB); 1883	May Queen	Lady Blanche (Family 2-n)
