= Brighton Beach Motordrome =

Racing facility in Brighton Beach, New York

Coordinates: 40°34′45″N 73°57′49″W

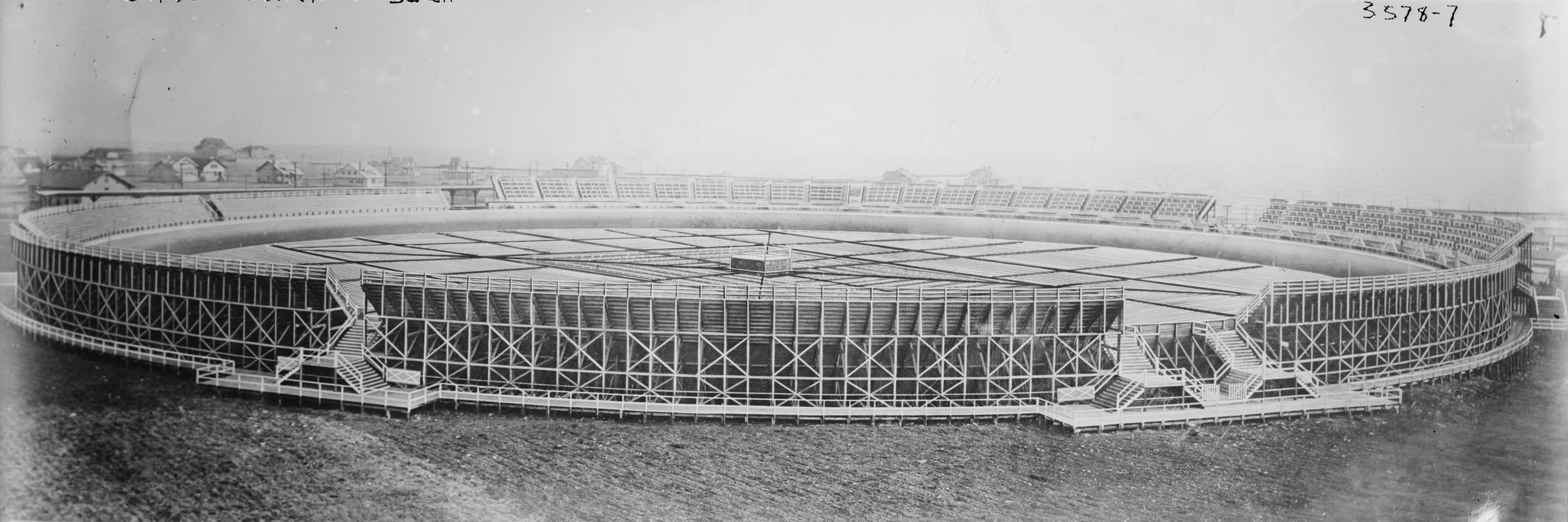
Brighton Beach Motordrome, also known as the Brighton Beach Stadium in 1915

Brighton Beach Motordrome, also known as the Brighton Beach Stadium, was a racing facility in Brighton Beach, New York. The Motordrome was originally named the Brighton Beach Race-Course, and became the Brighton Beach Motordrome in 1909. In 1915 A. H. Patterson took over as the proprietor of the racetrack.

== Records ==
- In 1913 Arthur Chapple and Henri St. Yves set the fifty-minute team speed record for motorcycles, traveling 67 miles.
- In 1917 Clarence Carman set the 10 mile bicycle speed record with a pace car, traveling the distance in 12:29.2.

== Notable people ==
- André Grapperon, champion motorcycle racer
