= Ballot (horse) =

American-bred Thoroughbred racehorse

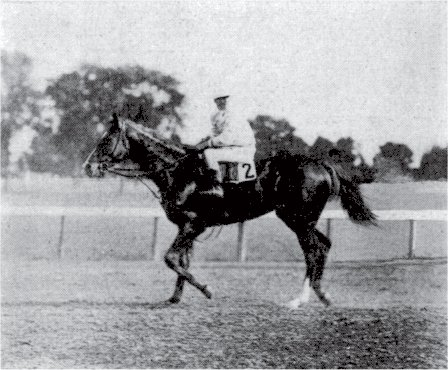
- Circa 1908.
- Sire: Voter
- Grandsire: Friar's Balsam
- Dam: Cerito
- Damsire: Lowland Chief
- Sex: Stallion
- Foaled: 1904
- Country: United States
- Colour: Chestnut
- Breeder: Castleton Stud
- Owner: James R. Keene
- Trainer: James G. Rowe Sr.
- Record: 37: 20-5-6
- Earnings: US$154,545

Major wins
- Double Event Stakes (part 1) (1906); Matron Stakes (1906); Neptune Stakes (1906); Century Handicap (1907, 1908); Edgemere Handicap (1907); First Special Stakes(1907); Great Republic Stakes (1907); Second Special Stakes(1907); Election Day Handicap (1907); Invincible Handicap (1907); Iroquois Stakes (1907); Advance Stakes (1908, 1910); Suburban Handicap (1908); Equality Stakes (1908); Broadway Stakes (1909)

Awards
- American Champion Older Male Horse (1908, 1910)

Honours
- Ballot Handicap at Aqueduct Racetrack
- Last updated on April 4, 2010

Ballot (April 18, 1904 – May 16, 1937) was an American two-time Champion Thoroughbred racehorse and damsire of the very important sire, Bull Lea.

Bred and raced by James R. Keene, owner of Castleton Stud in Lexington, Kentucky, he was out of the farm's broodmare Cerito and sired by Voter, their 1897 Metropolitan Handicap winner and the retrospective American Champion Older Male Horse of 1899.

Trained by future U.S. Racing Hall of Fame inductee, James Rowe, at age two Ballot won important races in 1906 but was overshadowed by that year's Champion, Salvidere. However, the following year he began winning consistently and set a new track record for a mile and a half in winning the Second Special Handicap at Gravesend Race Track. At age four in 1908 Ballot set a new world record at Sheepshead Bay Race Track for a mile and five sixteenths on dirt in winning the first of two editions of the Advance Stakes. His performances in 1908 earned him retrospective American Champion Older Male Horse honors.

Ballot raced in England in 1909 but met with little success on their grass racecourses. Returning to the United States for the 1910 season, he immediately returned to top form. His biggest win of the year came in the Advance Stakes in which he beat King James by two lengths. Ballot finished second in the August 4 Saratoga Handicap on a track described as a "sea of mud" by the Chicago Tribune and came out of the race with a foreleg injury that ended his racing career. His win in the Advance Stakes combined with top three finishes in other major races earned Ballot retrospective honors as the Co-American Champion Older Male Horse of 1910.

== As a sire ==
Retired to stud duty, Ballot stood at his owner's farm in 1911 then was sent to stud in England. He returned to the United States in 1913 where he was the sire of many stakes winners and for seven straight years was near the top of the leading American sire's list. Through his daughter, Forever (b. 1917), Ballot was the damsire of 1928 Belmont Stakes winner Vito. Through another daughter, Rose Leaves (b. 1916), Ballot left his most significant mark as the damsire of Bull Lea, a five-time Leading sire in North America and a four-time Leading broodmare sire in North America.

== Sire line tree ==
- Ballot
  - Midway
    - Percentage
      - Three Bars
        - Barred
        - Tonto Bars Grill
        - Rocket Bar
        - Sugar Bars
        - Lightning Bar
        - Steel Bars
        - Lucky Bar
        - Royal Bar
        - Mr Bar None
        - Triple Chick
        - Gay Bar King
        - Alamitos Bar
        - Bar Depth
        - Bar Money
        - Fairbars
        - Goldseeker Bars
        - Par Three
        - Kid Meyers
        - St Bar
        - The Ole Man
        - Zippo Pat Bars
        - Sport Bars
  - Chilhowee

== Pedigree ==
Pedigree of Ballot, bay stallion, 1904
Sire Voter	Friar's Balsam	Hermit	Newminster
Sire Voter	Friar's Balsam	Hermit	Seclusion
Sire Voter	Friar's Balsam	Flower of Dorset	Breadalbane*
Sire Voter	Friar's Balsam	Flower of Dorset	Imperatrice
Sire Voter	Mavourneen	Barcaldine	Solon
Sire Voter	Mavourneen	Barcaldine	Ballyroe
Sire Voter	Mavourneen	Gaydene	Albert Victor
Sire Voter	Mavourneen	Gaydene	Flora MacDonald*
Dam Cerito	Lowland Chief	Lowlander	Dalesman
Dam Cerito	Lowland Chief	Lowlander	Lufra
Dam Cerito	Lowland Chief	Bathilde	Stockwell*
Dam Cerito	Lowland Chief	Bathilde	Babette
Dam Cerito	Merry Dance	Doncaster	Stockwell*
Dam Cerito	Merry Dance	Doncaster	Marigold
Dam Cerito	Merry Dance	Highland Fling	Scottish Chief*
Dam Cerito	Merry Dance	Highland Fling	Masquerade (family: 14)

* Ballot is inbred 5S x 4D x 4D to the stallion Stockwell, meaning that he appears fifth generation once (via Breadalbane) on the sire side of his pedigree, and fourth generation twice on the dam side of his pedigree.

* Ballot is inbred 5S x 4D to the stallion Scottish Chief, meaning that he appears fifth generation (via Flora MacDonald) on the sire side of his pedigree, and fourth generation on the dam side of his pedigree.
