= Arthur E. Redfern =

American jockey (1885–1917)

Arthur Ewell Redfern
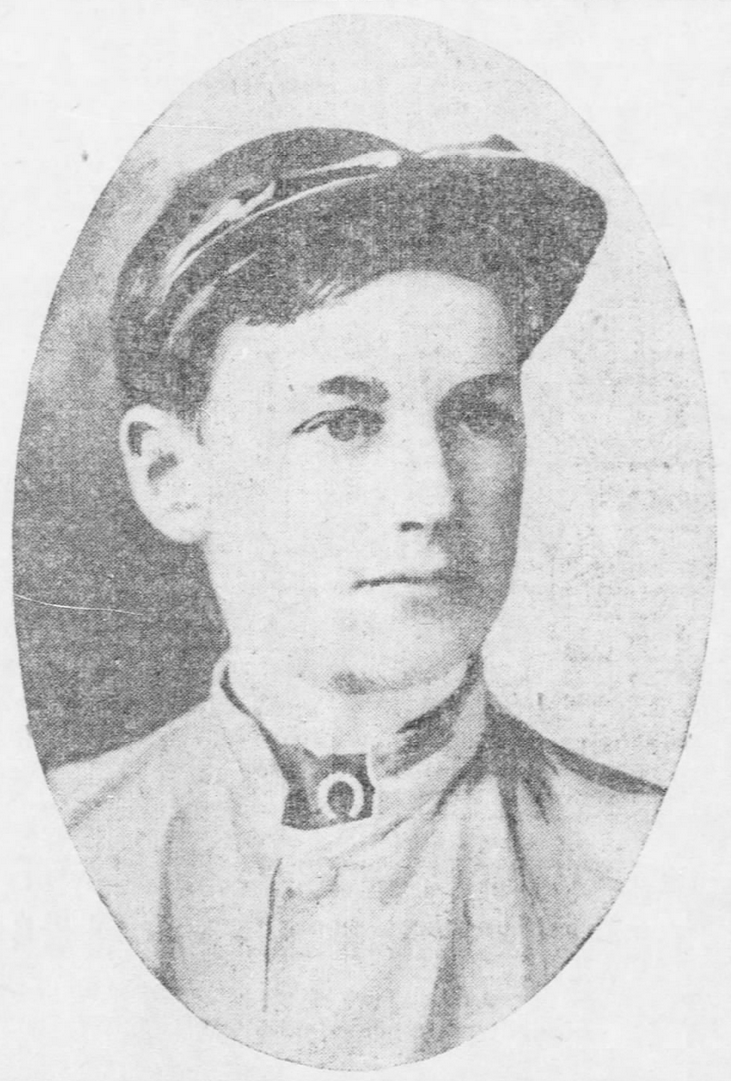

Personal information
- Born: October 4, 1885 Barnstable, Massachusetts
- Died: May 8, 1917 (aged 31) Coney Island, New York
- Occupation: Jockey

Horse racing career
- Sport: Horse racing

Major racing wins
- Alabama Stakes (1902); Brighton Junior Stakes (1902); Edgemere Handicap (1902, 1903); Fall Handicap (1902); Manhattan Handicap (1902); Sheepshead Bay Handicap (1902); Brighton Cup (1903); Brighton Oaks (1903); Foam Stakes (1903); Flight Stakes (1903); Long Island Handicap (1903); Annual Champion Stakes (1904); Double Event Stakes (part 2) (1904); Junior Champion Stakes (1904); Juvenile Stakes (1904); Laureate Stakes (1904); New Rochelle Handicap (1904); Pierrepont Handicap (1904); Saratoga Special Stakes (1904, 1905); Southampton Handicap (1904); Suburban Handicap (1904); Test Handicap (1904); Belmont Futurity Stakes (1905); Hopeful Stakes (1905); Saratoga Cup (1905); Spring Stakes (1905); Zephyr Stakes (1905)

Significant horses
- Dolly Spanker, Hermis, Sysonby

Arthur Ewell Redfern (October 4, 1885 – May 8, 1917) was an American Thoroughbred horse racing jockey who in 1903 was the highest paid rider in the United States.

== Riding career ==
Arthur Redfern made his reputation riding in Canada during 1901. After he relocated to New York that fall the Daily Racing Form reported he had been besieged by offers from various owners. Redfern cemented his reputation through his performance during the 1902 New York racing season when he rode for the Pepper Stable. In their November 11, 1902, issue, The New York Times wrote that Redfern was regarded by many American turfmen as the best jockey in the United States. The newspaper reported that right of first call for Redfern's services in 1903 had been purchased from stable owner Col. James E. Pepper by William Collins Whitney with the right to second call secured by James Ben Ali Haggin.

On April 23, 1903, Redfern was seriously injured in a racing accident at the Old Aqueduct Racetrack. Sidelined until June 12, the accident significantly affected Redfern's performance on his return to racing and by October 18 a newspaper story virtually dismissed him as a has-been. Nonetheless, by December 13 the Chicago Daily Tribune reported that he was the second leading jockey on the East Coast circuit.

In 1904 Arthur Redfern had a very good year in racing. During the early months of the year he raced in California. Back in New York for the summer season, he won major events such as the Saratoga Special Stakes and the most important race in the United States open to older horses, the Suburban Handicap at Sheepshead Bay Race Track. The June 17 Atlanta Constitution wrote that Redfern gave Hermis a "perfect ride" in winning the Suburban Handicap.

Although battling weight gain, in 1905 Arthur Redfern won his second consecutive Saratoga Special Stakes and a top race for two-year-olds, the Futurity Stakes at Sheepshead Bay Race Track. Redfern suffered a broken arm in an automobile accident in the early fall of 1905 that kept him out of racing for the rest of the year. For months, American newspapers carried stories filled with speculation that Redfern would move to Europe to race where weight limits were higher. and the January 30, 1906 San Jose Evening News stated that if Arthur Redfern did not sign to ride for James R. Keene, he would probably race in France. However, Redfern raced in New York in the first part of 1906 and, still battling weight gain, in November he followed fellow jockey Willie Knapp as well as notable trainers such as Sam Hildreth and Charles Durnell to race during the winter months in California.

== Racetrack shareholder ==
In 1906, Arthur Redfern and fellow jockey Jack Martin (jockey), became founding minority shareholders of the Montreal Jockey Club which built the new Blue Bonnets Raceway in Montreal, Quebec, that opened in 1907.

== Retirement ==
In 1907, Arthur Redfern was out of racing, ending a short but brilliant career in which he rode for other top stable owners such as Richard T. Wilson, Jr., John Sanford, and James R. Keene. As reported by the San Francisco Call of November 7, 1907, that said he was working as a chauffeur for trainer/owner Charles Durnell. The April 12, 1908, issue of the Daily Racing Form reported that Redfern had spent the winter in New Orleans and was planning to buy a string of horses to race. Although The Jockey Club issued Redfern a certificate of good standing in August 1908, it appears he did not ride again.

== Death ==
Arthur Redfern died at the Coney Island hospital on May 8, 1917, as a result of an automobile accident three days earlier in which his wife was seriously injured but survived.
