= Brighton Beach Race Course =

Horse racing course in Brooklyn, New York

Coordinates: 40°34′45″N 73°57′49″W

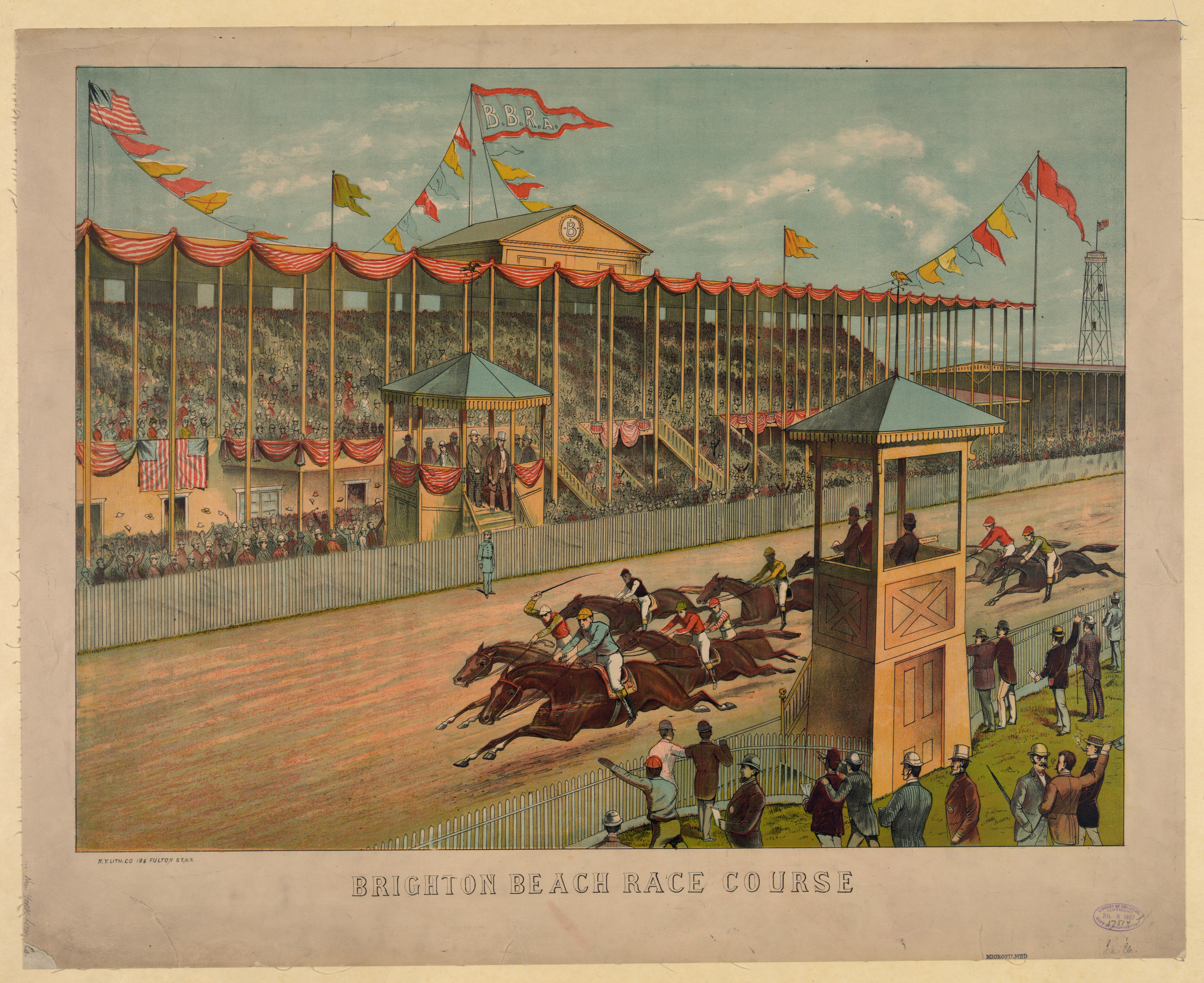
- Interactive map of Brighton Beach Race Course
- Location: Brighton Beach, Coney Island, Brooklyn, New York, United States
- Owned by: Brighton Beach Racing Association
- Date opened: June 28, 1879 (147 years ago)
- Course type: Flat & Steeplechase
- Notable races: Flat: Brighton Derby; Brighton Handicap; Brighton Junior Stakes; Brighton Mile; Brighton Oaks; Iroquois Stakes; Islip Handicap; Neptune Stakes; Produce Stakes; Seagate Stakes; Test Handicap

The Brighton Beach Race Course was an American Thoroughbred horse racing facility in Brighton Beach, Brooklyn, New York, opened on June 28, 1879 by the Brighton Beach Racing Association. Headed by real estate developer William A. Engeman, who owned the Brighton Beach Hotel, the one-mile race track was located in back of the hotel and bounded by Ocean Parkway on the west, Neptune Avenue on the north, Coney Island Avenue on the east, and Brighton Beach Avenue on the south. An instant success, the race track drew wealthy patrons from New York City, and harness racing was introduced there in 1901.

Among its most important Thoroughbred horse racing events were the Brighton Derby for three-year-olds and the Brighton Handicap that was open to older horses. On July 17, 1900, James R. Keene's horse Voter set a new World Record of 1:38.00 for a mile on dirt at the Brighton Beach Race Course.

The track prospered until 1908 when the New York Legislature passed the Hart–Agnew Law banning gambling in New York State. Motor racing events were held at the facility in an attempt to keep the track from closing but even after horse racing returned to New York it was too late to save the track. At the time it ceased horse racing operations, the Brighton Beach Race Course was the oldest horse track in steady use in the New York City area. The former racetrack, later known as the Brighton Beach Motordrome was then used for automobile racing for a time and after other measures failed to make it viable, the facility was finally torn down and by the 1920s replaced by residential housing.
