= James R. Keene =

American businessman (1838–1913)

James Robert Keene
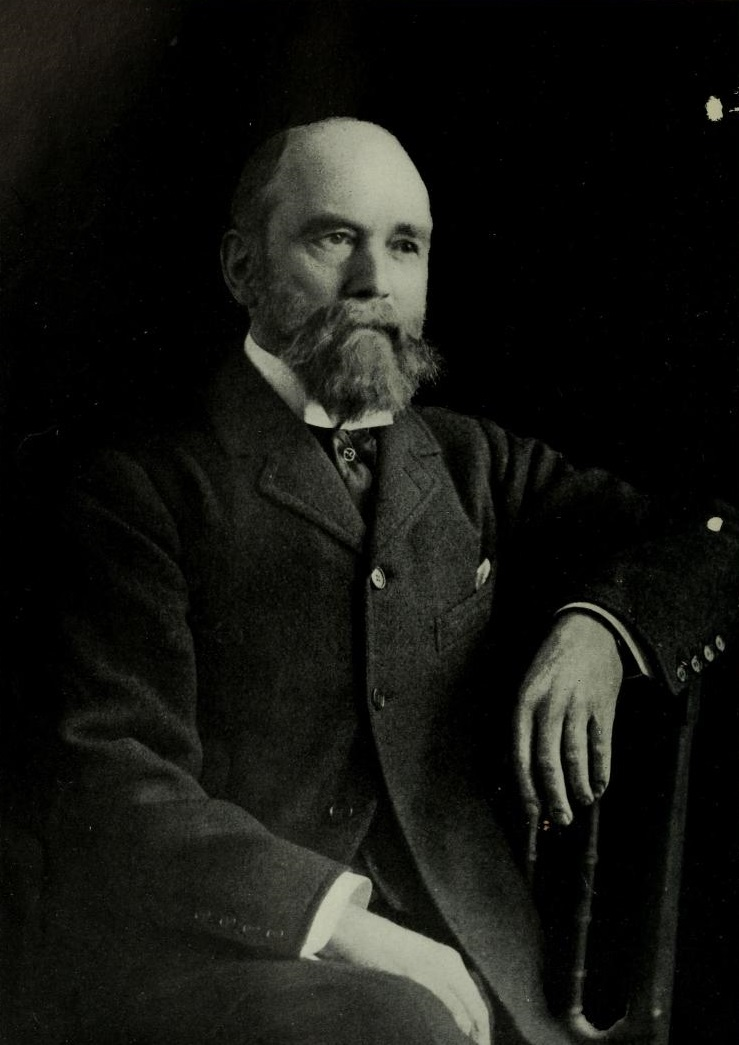
- Born: February 8, 1838; London, England
- Died: January 3, 1913 (aged 74); New York, New York, U.S.
- Resting place: Woodlawn Cemetery, Bronx
- Occupations: Businessman: Stockbroker; Racehorse owner/breeder
- Known for: Castleton Farm
- Spouse: Sara Jay Daingerfield (b. 1840, d. 1916)
- Children: Foxhall Parker Keene, Jessica Keene
- Honors: U.S. Racing Hall of Fame, Pillar of the Turf (2019)

Signature
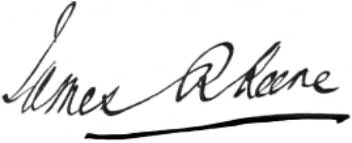

James Robert Keene (February 8, 1838 - January 3, 1913) was a Wall Street stockbroker and a major thoroughbred race horse owner and breeder.

== Biography ==
He was born in London, England in 1838. He was fourteen years of age when his family immigrated to the United States in 1852. As a young man he made a fortune through shrewd investments in California and Nevada mining companies and was eventually appointed president of the San Francisco Stock Exchange.

Wanting to expand his business opportunities, in 1876 he relocated to the heart of the country's financial center in New York City. While living there, he became interested in horse racing and began investing heavily in a stable of Thoroughbred race horses. His colt Spendthrift won the 1879 Belmont Stakes, and after Pierre Lorillard had shipped some of his American-bred horses to race in England and became the first American owner to win The Derby, Keene followed suit. In 1881, his horse Foxhall, named for his son, became the first American horse to win the Grand Prix de Paris, then the most important race in France. The following year Foxhall, trained in England by William Day, won England's Ascot Gold Cup.

However, in 1884 huge losses in the Chicago grain market cost him everything he owned, leaving him with nothing but heavy debts. He began a remarkable comeback a few years later after being hired by Wall Street investor William Havemeyer to manage a stock fund. Such were his talents at market manipulation that he was soon engaged by J. P. Morgan and William Rockefeller to manage funds for them and Keene emerged once again as a wealthy and powerful force in the New York financial community.

By 1891 James R. Keene was back to investing in racehorses and his Castleton Farm near Lexington, Kentucky became one of the most important breeding operations in the history of American horse racing. In the early 1890s, Keene bought over forty English mares and shipped them to Castleton for breeding. Keene hired his brother-in-law, Major Foxhall Daingerfield, to run Castleton Farm and for his racing stable he hired James G. Rowe Sr. as a trainer. He returned to racing in England, this time involving his son Foxhall P. Keene in the racing stable. Their filly Cap and Bells II won the 1901 Epsom Oaks. In 1908, London Sportsman magazine wrote that Keene possessed, "the greatest lot of racehorses ever owned by one man."

James R. Keene bred National Museum of Racing and Hall of Famer Kingston and owned Domino, as well as breeding and owning future Hall of Famer inductees Colin, Peter Pan, Commando, Maskette, and Sysonby. Keene owned six Belmont Stakes winners but at a time when transporting horses south to other racetracks via railroad was a long, costly, and often risky venture, he never entered his horses in the Kentucky Derby, and won the Preakness Stakes only once.

He died on January 3, 1913, of an acute stomach ailment at Miss Alston's House for Private Patients in Manhattan. He was interred in Woodlawn Cemetery in The Bronx. He was vice-Chairman of the Jockey Club at the time of his death.

== Family ==
In 1863 he married Sara Jay Daingerfield of Virginia with whom he had son Foxhall and a daughter, Jessica. Sara Keene died in 1916 and is interred in Woodlawn Cemetery next to her husband. Biographer Alden Hatch collaborated with Foxhall Keene to write James R. Keene's biography titled Full Tilt that was published in 1938 by Derrydale Press.

== Racing ==
In 2019, James R. Keene was voted into the National Museum of Racing and Hall of Fame as one of its esteemed Pillars of the Turf.

Preakness Stakes winner

- 1894 : Assignee

Belmont Stakes winners

- 1879 : Spendthrift
- 1901 : Commando
- 1904 : Delhi
- 1907 : Peter Pan
- 1908 : Colin
- 1910 : Sweep
