= Jonathan Sheppard Stakes =

Grade I thoroughbred steeplechase horse race

- Class: Grade I
- Location: Saratoga Race Course; Saratoga Springs, New York
- Inaugurated: 1938
- Race type: Thoroughbred – Steeplechase

Race information
- Distance: 2 3/8 miles (19 furlongs)
- Surface: Turf
- Track: Left-handed
- Qualification: Four-year-olds and up
- Purse: $150,000

The Jonathan Sheppard Stakes (formerly known as the New York Turf Writers Cup) is a steeplechase race for Thoroughbred horses held at the Saratoga Race Course in Saratoga Springs, New York each year. A Grade I event on the turf for 4-year-olds and up, it offers a purse of $150,000.

The race was originally named for the New York Turf Writers Association, which was founded in 1923. The first running of the race was contested in 1938.

In 2021, NYRA renamed the race in honor of thoroughbred trainer Jonathan E. Sheppard. Inducted into the National Museum of Racing and Hall of Fame in 1990, Sheppard has won the New York Turf Writers Cup fifteen times between 1979 and 2019. Sheppard announced his retirement from the sport in January 2021 after a 56-year career.

== Past winners ==
- 2020 - Rashaan (5) (Thomas Garner)
- 2019 - Winston C (5) (Thomas Garner)
- 2018 - Optimus Prime (6) (Ross Geraghty)
- 2017- Diplomat (8) (Bernard Dalton)
- 2016 - Portrade (IRE) (7) (Gustav Dahl)
- 2015 - Bob Le Beau (8) (Jack Doyle)
- 2014 - Demonstrative (7) (Robbie Walsh)
- 2013 - Italian Wedding (8) (Bernard Dalton)
- 2012 - Demonstrative (5) (Robert Walsh)
- 2011 - Mabou (8) (Robert Walsh)
- 2010 - Sermon of Love (7) (Brian Crowley)
- 2009 - Spy in the Sky (5) (Liam McVicar)
- 2008 - Dark Equation (7) (Matthew McCarron)
- 2007 - Footlights (7) (Xavier Aizpuru)
- 2006 - Mixed Up (7) (Danielle Hodsdon)
- 2005 - Hirapour (IRE) (9) (Matthew McCarron)
- 2004 - Tres Touche (7) (David Bentley)
- 2003 - Praise the Prince (NZ) (8) (Gus Brown)
- 2002 - Zabenz (NZ) (Craig Thornton)
- 2001 - It's A Giggle (7) (Blythe Miller)
- 2000 - Ninepins (GB) (13) (Arch Kingsley Jr.)
- 1999 - Campanile (5) (Bruce Miller)
- 1998 - Hokan (5) (Sean Clancy)
- 1997 - Bisbalense (CH) (8) (Arch Kingsley Jr.)
- 1996 - Petroski (6) (Keith O'Brien)
- 1995 - Lonesome Glory (7) (Blythe Miller)
- 1994 - Mistico (8) (Craig Thornton)
- 1993 - Warm Spell (5) (James Lawrence)
- 1992 - Yaw (10) (Jonathan Smart)
- 1991 - Yaw (9) (Jonathan Smart)
- 1990 - Double Bill (7) (Ben Guessford)
- 1989 - Double Bill (6) (Ben Guessford)
- 1988 - Rio Clara (5) (Gregg Morris)
- 1987 - Chief Of The Clan (4) (J. Lawrence II)
- 1986 - Le Sauteur (7) (B. Houghton)
- 1985 - Bobby Burns (3) (Walter Guerra)
- 1984 - Flatterer (5) (J. Fishback)
- 1983 - Double Reefed (7) (J. Cushman)
- 1982 - Zaccio (6) (R. Hendriks)
- 1981 - Running Com (7) (R. McWade)
- 1980 - Zaccio (4) (R. McWade)
- 1979 - Leaping Frog (6) (B. Christison)
- 1978 - Happy Intellectual (12) (W. Martin)
- 1977 - Happy Intellectual (11) (Joe Aitcheson Jr.)
- 1976 - Happy Intellectual (10) (C. Elser)
- 1975 - Life's Illusion (4) (Fout A. Quanbeck)
- 1971 - Soothsayer (4) (J. Fishback)
- 1970 - El Martirio (6) (Davis P. Plain)
- 1969 - Jaunty (4) (Joe Aitcheson Jr.)
- 1968 - Le Cerisier (6) (C. Moore)
- 1967 - Roublet (4) (Joe Aitcheson Jr.)
- 1966 - Spooky Joe (4) (D. Small Jr.)
- 1965 - Susto (5) (D. Small Jr.)
- 1964 - Sun Game (4) (T. Walsh)
- 1963 - Exhibit A (S. McDonald)
- 1962 - Baby Prince (F. Winter)
- 1961 - Royal Vision (Joe Aitcheson Jr.)
- 1960 - Nautilus (E. Jackson)
- 1959 - Lanton Breeze (T. Walsh)
- 1958 - Nizam's Pet (P. Smithwick)
- 1957 - Policeman Day (J. Murphy)
- 1956 - Muguet II (J. Cotter)
- 1955 - Oneida (J. Cotter)
- 1954 - Ancestor (Dooley Adams)
- 1953 - Eternal Son (E. Carter)
- 1952 - Clive of India (P. Smithwick)
- 1951 - Triomphe (P. Smithwick)
- 1950 - Gerrymander (E. Carter)
- 1949 - Escarp (G. Riley)
- 1948 - Pebalong (Dooley Adams)
- 1947 - Look Around (T. Field)
- 1946 - Canford (J. Magee)
- 1945 - Reykjavik (Dooley Adams)
- 1943 - Harford (M. Morlan)
- 1942 - Picture Prince (S. Riles)
- 1941 - The Beak (F. McMillan)
- 1940 - Canio (F. Maier)
- 1939 - Golden Oak (J. Magee)
- 1938 - Prince Wick (H. Frost Jr.)

== See also ==
- New York Racing Association
