= Vincent Powers =

American jockey and trainer

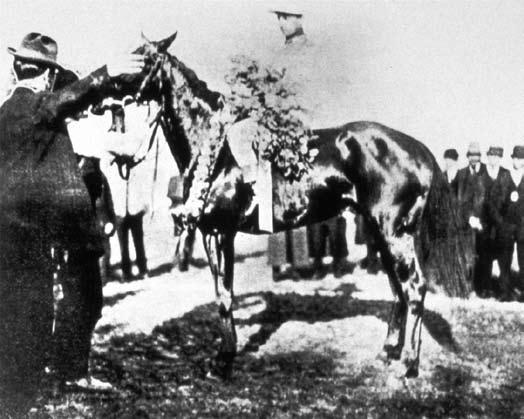
- Vincent Powers at the 1909 Kentucky Derby

Personal information
- Born: June 6, 1891 Westfield, New York
- Died: October 19, 1966 (aged 75) New York City, New York
- Occupation: Jockey / Trainer

Horse racing career
- Sport: Horse racing

Major racing wins
- Double Event Stakes (part 1) (1909); Fleetwing Handicap (1909); Foam Stakes (1909); Great Trial Stakes (1909); Surf Stakes (1909); Fashion Stakes (1910); Saratoga Cup (1910) American Classics wins: Kentucky Derby (1909)

Racing awards
- U.S. Champion flat racing Jockey by wins (1908, 1909); U.S. Champion Steeplechase Jockey by wins (1917)

Honors
- Chautauqua Sports Hall of Fame (2015); U.S. Racing Hall of Fame (2015)

Significant horses
- Wintergreen, Cherry Malotte, Countless, Donau, Fitz Herbert, Jolly Roger, Maskette, Short Grass

Vincent Minford Powers (June 6, 1891 – October 19, 1966) was an American Champion jockey and trainer who competed in both flat racing and steeplechase racing. He rode the winning horse Wintergreen in the 1909 Kentucky Derby and in 1927 and 1928 rode Jolly Roger to back-to-back wins in the most important steeplechase race in the United States, the American Grand National. He was inducted into the National Museum of Racing and Hall of Fame in 2015 as well as the Chautauqua County, New York Sports Hall of Fame in formal ceremonies held on February 16, 2015.

In his early teens, Vincent Powers went to Canada where he worked at the Fort Erie Race Track as an exercise rider. That job led to his career as a jockey, the training for which came when he was managed by future Canadian Horse Racing Hall of Fame trainer John Nixon.

In 1908 and 1909, Vincent Powers earned national riding championships when he won more races than any other jockey in United States flat racing. In 1917 he became the first jockey in American racing to win a National Championship in both steeplechase and flat racing.
