= 1909 Kentucky Derby =

Horse race

35th Kentucky Derby
- Kentucky Derby
- Grade I stakes race
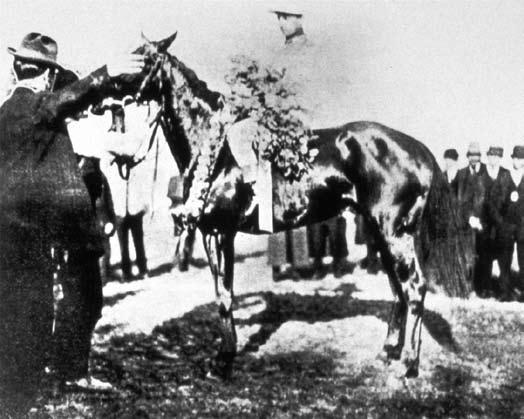
- 1909 Kentucky Derby winner Wintergreen
- Location: Churchill Downs
- Date: May 3, 1909
- Winning horse: Wintergreen
- Jockey: Vincent Powers
- Trainer: Charles Mack
- Owner: Jerome B. Respess
- Surface: Dirt

The 1909 Kentucky Derby was the 35th running of the Kentucky Derby. The race took place on May 3, 1909.

== Full results ==
Finished	Post	Horse	Jockey	Trainer	Owner	Time / behind
1st	6	Wintergreen	Vincent Powers	Charles Mack	Jerome B. Respess	2:08.20
2nd	1	Miami	Carroll H. Shilling	W. L. Lewis	Johnson N. Camden Jr.	4
3rd	3	Dr. Barkley	Stanley B. Page	Walter Grater	Lee Smitha	3
4th	9	Sir Catesby	Sam Heidel	Thomas P. Hayes	Thomas P. Hayes	Head
5th	7	Friend Harry	Phil Musgrave	G. C. Baker	Edward Alvey	4
6th	5	Direct	A. Walsh	William J. Young	William J. Young	3
7th	8	Michael Angelo	George Taplin	John Walters	George M. Hendrie	3
8th	10	Warfield	Dale Austin	William J. Young	Joseph H. Lesch	3
9th	2	Campeon	Matt McGee	Peter W. Coyne	George J. Long	8
10th	4	Match Me	James Lee	A. J. Gorey	A. J. Gorey	2

- Winning Breeder: Jerome B. Respess; (OH)
- Horses T.M. Green, Ada Meade, and Woolwinder scratched before the race.

== Payout ==
Post	Horse	Win	Place	Show
6	Wintergreen	$ 14.80	8.75	8.60
1	Miami		9.15	9.25
3	Dr. Barkley			20.70

- The winner received a purse of $4,850.
- Second place received $700.
- Third place received $300.
