= Reel (horse) =

American-bred Thoroughbred racehorse

- Reel by Edward Troye
- Sire: Glencoe
- Grandsire: Sultan
- Dam: Gallopade
- Damsire: Catton
- Sex: Mare
- Foaled: 1838
- Country: United States
- Colour: Gray
- Breeder: James Jackson
- Owner: General Thomas Jefferson Wells
- Trainer: Not found
- Record: 8: 7-0-0
- Earnings: Not found

Major wins
- Jockey Club Purse (1841)
- Last updated on July 20, 2007

Reel was a thoroughbred race horse, and one of the greatest American Thoroughbred broodmares in history.

== Racing career ==
Reel was born in Alabama at the farm of James Jackson, although both her sire and dam were imported from England. Before he was purchased by James Jackson's stud farm, Reel's sire Glencoe won the 2,000 Guineas and Ascot Gold Cup during his English racing career. Glencoe also sired the great broodmare Pocahontas, considered to be one of the most important female lines in history. Through Pocahontas, his blood runs through three great sires and racehorses: Stockwell, Rataplan, and King Tom (horse). In America, Glencoe was the leading sire in 1847, 1849, 1850, and from 1854 to 1858, inclusive.

During his first American season in 1837, Glencoe covered Galopade. She had already produced two fillies that became successful broodmares when crossed to Glencoe: Fandango and Cotillion (both by Leviathan). Galopade had been bred by Colonel King and was imported to Canada in 1836 before James Jackson purchased her. Her sire, Catton, was also sire to Trustee (father of the mare Fashion and other great horses). Galopade was one of the most productive mares ever bred. Her three great daughters—Fandango, Cotillion, and Reel—extend into the bloodlines of many winners of today.

General Thomas Jefferson Wells, brother of Louisiana Governor James Madison Wells, purchased a half interest in the yearling Reel for $1,000 and became the sole owner of the filly before she was three. As a three-year-old, she began her career winning the first two races of two miles before claiming the Jockey Club Purse in the four-miler. As a four-year-old, she won four more races, including a match race with Miss Foote. During this time, she almost set a new record for 4 miles (7:32), which was held by Fashion.

She lost once in her career, as a five-year-old, after she took a bad step and could not catch the leading colt, George Martin. She retired after that race with 7 wins out of 8 starts.

== Breeding career ==
Reel is one of the greatest American broodmares of the 19th century. During her breeding career, she produced 13 foals to 7 different stallions, 10 of which were top classic runners. Reel passed on not only her running ability, but also her color (eight of her offspring were gray).

Reel lived most of her breeding career (from 1845 onward) at the farm of J.R. Gross, in northern Kentucky, where she was boarded with the rest of Well's horses.

Reel's blood is found in later champions: Chris Evert (CCA Oaks), Winning Colors (Santa Anita Derby, Santa Anita Oaks, and the Kentucky Derby, 2nd Breeders' Cup Distaff, 3rd Preakness Stakes), Two Lea, Tim Tam (winner of the 1958 Kentucky Derby, Preakness Stakes, and 2nd in the Belmont Stakes) due to an injury, Sweet Native, and Chief's Crown, (Breeders' Cup Juvenile, 2nd Preakness Stakes).

1844: Lincoln (chestnut colt by Leviathan)

1845: Stafford (gray colt by Leviathan)

1846: Captain Elgee (gray colt by Leviathan)

1847: Bob Green (gray gelding by Ambassador)

1848: Ann Dunn (gray filly by Sovereign)

1850: Lecomte (chestnut colt by Boston)

1851: Ashland (gray colt by Wagner)

1853: Prioress (bay filly by Sovereign)

1854: Calvit (gray colt by Yorkshire)

1855: Starke (chestnut colt by Wagner)

1856: Dentley (gray colt by Yorkshire)

1858: Fanny Wells (gray filly by Sovereign)

1859 or 1860: War Dance (chestnut colt by Lexington)

Note: The American stud book lists War Dance as foaled in 1859, but some claim that this is an error, and he was actually foaled in 1860.

- Captain Elgee: sired two daughters, both out of Albion: Wenonah and Lantana. Wenonah was dam to 1879 Kentucky Derby winner Lord Murphy, as well as to Sue Walton (the dam of stakes winner Barrett). Lantana was dam to 1879 Kentucky Oaks winner Liahtunah, who would go on to foal the stakes winner, Gipsey Queen. She also produced Poca Wiley, the third dam to Highball, 1903 juvenile champion.
- Lecomte: the best of Reel's offspring, Lecomte was a fantastic winner, only challenged by his half-brother (also by Boston), Lexington. His first loss was to Lexington, after six straight wins, although he later went on to beat his rival in the Jockey Club Purse, which would be Lexington's only defeat. Lecomte set a record for 4 miles (7:26), and won a total of 11 races in America. Lecomte was later purchased by Lexington's owner Richard Ten Broeck for $10,000 and sent to England, where he performed terribly in two starts, before dying of colic in 1857. However, he had one crop of foals, which he sired in 1856 before he left for England. These foals include Umpire, Uncle Jeff, an unnamed filly who went on to foal Lizzie G., dam of Mannie Gray, (dam of Domino, and Correction, and was granddam to Hamburg). Lecomte was elected to the US Hall of Fame in 2024.
- Prioress: Prioress was the first American-bred and owned horse to win a major race in England. While in England, she was part of the triple dead heat carrying 93 pounds, with El Hakim (93 pounds) and Queen Bess (66 pounds) in the 1857 Cesarewitch, and she won the run-off to claim victory at the Caesarwitch. She also won the Great Yorkshire Handicap and Queen's Plates at Newmarket and Epsom. She went on to produce six foals, none of note, before dying in 1868 while foaling. Prioress set a record for one-mile heats (1:46 1/4 and 1:45).
- War Dance: was the product of the best mare in America, Reel, to the best stallion in America, Lexington. He was bred by General Wells and purchased as a two-year-old by A. Keene Richards. War Dance raced under the name of General Westmore, but is most notable as a sire, especially of broodmares, including: Blue Grass Belle, Brademante, Buff-and-Blue, Lizzy G., Vega, War Reel, and War Song. One of his fillies, Modesty, beat out colts to win the American Derby. Lizzie G., as mentioned, was dam to Mannie Gray (who was in turn dam to Domino and Correction), Faustus and Goodnight. Lizzie G. was inbred 2x3 to Reel, her sire being War Dance and her damsire Lecomte. Bradmante produced the champion stallion The Bard. His colts include: Chance, Wyoming, Stampede, Bullion and Limestone.
- Starke: raced successfully in England, including winning the Goodwood Stakes (2.5 miles), the Bentibck Memorial (3 miles, 5 furlongs), and the Warwick Cup (3 miles). He won the Goodwood Cup as a five-year-old. He was then sold for $7,000 to Prussia, where he stood at stud.
- Ann Dunn: one of the three Reel fillies, died while training as a four-year-old.
- Fanny Wells: the last of the three fillies out of Reel, she was also the most influential. She was dam to two stakes winners: Nellie Gray and Jils Johnson. Jils Johnson sired the fillies: Famine (dam to steeplechaser Good and Plenty) and Belle of Nantura. Fanny Wells is also influential in the bloodlines of champions Two Lea, Tim Tam, Chris Evert, Chief's Crown, and Winning Colors.
