= Disguise (horse) =

American-bred Thoroughbred racehorse

- Sire: Domino
- Grandsire: Himyar
- Dam: Bonnie Gal
- Damsire: Galopin
- Sex: Stallion
- Foaled: 1897
- Country: United States
- Color: Bay
- Breeder: James R. & Foxhall P. Keene
- Owner: James R. & Foxhall P. Keene; James W. Corrigan
- Trainer: Sam Darling
- Record: 8: 3-0-4
- Earnings: US$40,295

Major wins
- Jockey Club Stakes (1900)

Disguise (foaled May 10, 1897 in Kentucky) was an American Thoroughbred racehorse who won the 1900 Jockey Club Stakes in England but is best remembered for his success as a sire.

== Background ==
Disguise was bred by wealthy Wall Street stockbroker James R. Keene at his Castleton Stud Farm near Lexington, Kentucky. His sire was the Hall of Fame inductee Domino, who also sired Hall of Fame inductee Commando. In turn, Commando sired the Leading U.S. Sire in 1921 Celt as well as the Champion Peter Pan and Colin, an undefeated (15-15) Champion and Hall of Fame inductee.

Disguise's dam was Bonnie Gal, a daughter of 1875 Epsom Derby Galopin who won eight of nine starts and was a three-time Leading sire in Great Britain and Ireland. Galopin was the sire of the supersire St. Simon (1881) as well as Donovan (1886). The latter's eighteen wins include the Epsom Derby and St Leger Stakes. Among Bonnie Gal's other offspring was Belgravia (1903), a daughter of Ben Brush. Belgravia was the dam of the very successful sire, Black Toney.

== Racing career ==
Disguise was sent to race in England for his two and three-year-old seasons where he was trained by Sam Darling. The colt had his most important success at Newmarket Racecourse when he won the 1900 Jockey Club Stakes defeating Diamond Jubilee. In the prestigious Epsom Derby, a part of the English Triple Crown series, Diamond Jubilee turned the tables, beating runner-up Simon Dale with Disguise finishing third. Diamond Jubilee went on to win that year's Triple Crown.

== Success as a sire ==
In 1901, Disguise was returned to the United States to stand at stud at his owner's Castleton Farm. Following the death of James R. Keene, his son Foxhall Keene sold off the farm's Bloodstock. Disguise was purchased at the September 1913 Castleton dispersal auction for $5,300 by James W. Corrigan and Price McKinley, owners of Wickliffe Stud, who brought him to stand at their Kingston Farm near Lexington, Kentucky. Five years later, the Wickliffe Stud bloodstock would too be sold in a January 15, 1918, dispersal sale. Disguise was then bought for $4,200 by John Rosseter to stand at his Rancho Wikiup in California. He lived out his life there, dying at age 30 in 1927.

The progeny of Disguise includes:

- Court Dress (1904) – 1906 U.S. Champion 2YO Filly
- Helmet (1906) – winner of 1908 Hopeful, Matron and Champagne Stakes. Helmet sired Bob Tail, winner of the 1924 Raceland Derby in which he defeated that year's Kentucky Derby winner Back Gold.
- Maskette (1906) – 1908 U.S. Champion 2YO Filly and 1909 U.S. Champion 3YO Filly, U.S. Racing Hall of Fame
- Melisande (1906) – at age two won the Castleton Stakes, Clover Stakes, Demoiselle Stakes, Laureate Stakes, and the Vernal Stakes. She did not race as a three-year-old but at four returned to the track and won the Falls City Handicap against her male counterparts.
- Iron Mask (1908) – multiple stakes winner in the U.S. and England, track record holder
- Comely (1912) – her win in the first edition of the Fall Highweight Handicap was a remarkable performance in that she was not only a two-year-old filly who defeated older male rivals, but the only two-year-old in history to ever win the race. The Comely Stakes was named to honor her achievement.
- Elfin Queen (1916) – 1918 U.S. Champion 2YO Filly

== Success as a broodmare sire ==
- Hester Prynne (1910) - the dam of Pillory, winner of the Preakness and Belmont Stakes and was the 1922 leading money winner in the United States
- Miss Puzzle (1913) - dam of Questionnaire, an outstanding runner for New York grocery magnate James Butler who owned Empire City Race Track

== Sire line tree ==
- Disguise
  - Helmet
    - Bob Tail
  - Iron Mask

== Pedigree ==
Pedigree of Disguise, bay stallion, 1897
Sire Domino	Himyar	Alarm	Eclipse
Sire Domino	Himyar	Alarm	Maud
Sire Domino	Himyar	Hira	Lexington*
Sire Domino	Himyar	Hira	Hegira
Sire Domino	Mannie Gray	Enquirer	Leamington
Sire Domino	Mannie Gray	Enquirer	Lida*
Sire Domino	Mannie Gray	Lizzie G	War Dance*
Sire Domino	Mannie Gray	Lizzie G	Lecomte mare
Dam Bonnie Gal	Galopin	Vedette	Voltigeur
Dam Bonnie Gal	Galopin	Vedette	Mrs Ridgway
Dam Bonnie Gal	Galopin	Flying Dutchess	The Flying Dutchman
Dam Bonnie Gal	Galopin	Flying Dutchess	Merope
Dam Bonnie Gal	Bonnie Doon	Rapid Rhone	Young Melbourne
Dam Bonnie Gal	Bonnie Doon	Rapid Rhone	Lanercost mare
Dam Bonnie Gal	Bonnie Doon	Queen Mary	Gladiator
Dam Bonnie Gal	Bonnie Doon	Queen Mary	Plenipotentiary mare (family: 10-c)

* Disguise is inbred 4S x 5S x 5S to the stallion Lexington, meaning that he appears fourth generation once and fifth generation twice (via Lida and War Dance) on the sire side of his pedigree.
