= Cap and bells (disambiguation) =

The cap and bells is a jester's cap.

Cap and bells may also refer to:

- Cap and Bells, a 1913 film by Frank Clewlow
- Cap and Bells (horse), a thoroughbred filly, the 1901 winner of Epsom Oaks
- Cap and Bells, an 1886 book by Samuel Minturn Peck
- The Cap and Bells, an 1819 verse by John Keats
- The Cap and Bells, an 1894 poem by W. B. Yeats
- Le Bonnet du fou, a 1918 film by Luigi Pirandello
