= Pillory (horse) =

American-bred Thoroughbred racehorse

- Sire: Olambala
- Grandsire: Ornus
- Dam: Hester Prynne
- Damsire: Disguise
- Sex: Stallion
- Foaled: 1919
- Country: United States
- Colour: Chestnut
- Breeder: Richard T. Wilson, Jr.
- Owner: Richard T. Wilson, Jr.
- Record: 12: 5-1-3
- Earnings: $96,904

Major wins
- Triple Crown Race wins: Preakness Stakes (1922); Belmont Stakes (1922)
- Last updated on September 28, 2008

Pillory (foaled 1919 in Kentucky) was an American Thoroughbred racehorse.

== Background ==
Pillory was a chestnut horse bred and raced by the co-owner and president of Saratoga Race Course, Richard Thornton Wilson Jr. Pillory was sired by Wilson's Olambala, a multiple winner of important races including the Latonia Derby and Suburban Handicap, and who sired several top runners including the 1916 American Champion Two-Year-Old Colt Campfire, and top handicap winner Sunfire. Pillory's damsire was Disguise, who raced for James R. Keene in England and was a son of Domino.

== Racing career ==
At age three in 1922, Pillory ran second to J. S. Cosden's French import Snob II. Thoroughbred racing in 1922 was still a time when the U.S. Triple Crown series had not yet achieved the level of importance it would in the next decade. As such, despite being very important races, the Kentucky Derby and the Preakness Stakes were both run on May 13, 1922. The handlers of New York–based Pillory chose not to send the colt on the long railroad trip to Louisville for the Derby. Instead, they entered the colt in the then 1 1/8-mile (1.8 km) Preakness Stakes at Pimlico Race Course in Baltimore, Maryland. In the Preakness, Pillory took the lead on the turn into the stretch and prevailed by a head from Hea after what the press described as a "furious" drive to the finish. Pillory's time of 1:51.60 equaled the winning time of Man o' War two years earlier.

== Stud record ==
Pillory was not successful at stud. He was eventually sold to the U.S. Army as a remount stallion.

== Pedigree ==
Pedigree of Pillory (USA), chestnut stallion, 1919
Sire Olambala (USA) 1906	Ornus (GB); 1891	Bend Or	Doncaster
Sire Olambala (USA) 1906	Ornus (GB); 1891	Bend Or	Rouge Rose
Sire Olambala (USA) 1906	Ornus (GB); 1891	Ashgrove	Albert Victor
Sire Olambala (USA) 1906	Ornus (GB); 1891	Ashgrove	Schechallion
Sire Olambala (USA) 1906	Blue and White (USA); 1887	Virgil	Vandal
Sire Olambala (USA) 1906	Blue and White (USA); 1887	Virgil	Hymenia
Sire Olambala (USA) 1906	Blue and White (USA); 1887	Madam Dudley	Lexington
Sire Olambala (USA) 1906	Blue and White (USA); 1887	Madam Dudley	Britannia
Dam Hester Prynne (USA) 1910	Disguise (USA); 1897	Domino	Himyar
Dam Hester Prynne (USA) 1910	Disguise (USA); 1897	Domino	Mannie Gray
Dam Hester Prynne (USA) 1910	Disguise (USA); 1897	Bonnie Gal	Galopin
Dam Hester Prynne (USA) 1910	Disguise (USA); 1897	Bonnie Gal	Bonnie Doon
Dam Hester Prynne (USA) 1910	Witchcraft (USA); 1901	Horoscope	Amphion
Dam Hester Prynne (USA) 1910	Witchcraft (USA); 1901	Horoscope	Fair Vision
Dam Hester Prynne (USA) 1910	Witchcraft (USA); 1901	Queenston	Spendthrift
Dam Hester Prynne (USA) 1910	Witchcraft (USA); 1901	Queenston	Kapanga (Family 13)
