= Jolly Roger (horse) =

Steeplechase racehorse

- Jolly Roger with Robert H. Crawford up, by Franklin Brooke Voss
- Sire: Pennant
- Grandsire: Peter Pan
- Dam: Lethe
- Damsire: All Gold
- Sex: Stallion
- Foaled: 1922
- Country: United States
- Color: Chestnut
- Breeder: Harry Payne Whitney
- Owner: Greentree Stable
- Trainer: Vincent Powers
- Record: 49: 18-9-9
- Earnings: $13,175 (flat) $130,065 (steeplechase)

Major wins
- Rustic Steeplechase (1925); Elkridge Steeplechase (1925); Wood Park Steeplechase (1926); Wheatley Steeplechase Handicap (1926); Wingfield Steeplechase Handicap (1926); Baldwin Steeplechase (1926); Bayside Steeplechase Handicap (1927); Brook Steeplechase Handicap (1927); Charles L. Appleton Memorial Cup Steeplechase (1927); Cherry Malotte Steeplechase (1927); Corintian Steeplechase Handicap (1927, 1928); Glendale Steeplechase Handicap (1930); North American Steeplechase Handicap (1930) American Steeplchase Classics wins: Grand National Steeplechase (1927, 1928)

Honors
- U.S. Racing Hall of Fame (1965)
- Last updated on July 23, 2020

Jolly Roger (1922 – July 3, 1948) was an American steeplechase racehorse whose outstanding career saw him inducted into the National Museum of Racing and Hall of Fame.

== Background ==
Jolly Roger was a chestnut with 4 white stockings and a blaze. He was bred by his owner, Payne Whitney. Jolly Roger's sire was Pennant, whose sire was Hall of Fame inductee Peter Pan. Jolly Roger was trained by Vincent Powers.

== Flat years ==
Jolly Roger first raced on the flat racehorse but with only one win from ten starts was switched to jumps racing.

== Jumping career highlights ==
=== 3-year old jump season ===
Jolly Roger became an American Novice jumper with his biggest win being the Elkridge Steeplechase.

=== 4-year old season ===
As a 4 year old he improved with 2 big wins in the Wingfield Steeplechase Handicap and the Wheatley Steeplechase Handicap.

=== 5-6 year old season ===
As a 5-6 year old he was at his peak and won an epic rivalry between another hall of fame American Steeplechaser in Fairmount. During this time, Jolly Roger won the prestigious Grand National Hurdle Stakes for the first time. He also won the Brook and the Bayside Steeplechase Handicaps, the Charles L. Appleton Memorial Cup and the Corinthian Steeplechase as a five-year-old. At age 6, he won his second and last Grand National Hurdle Stakes.

=== 7 year old season ===
As a 7 year old Jolly Roger was dormant and never won a race in 4 starts. He could only go for 3 3rd's and a 2nd.

=== 8-year old season ===
At age 8, Jolly Roger competed in 8 races with two victories in the Glendale and the North American Steeplechase Handicaps. He finished his career as the richest American steeplechaser and in 1965 was inducted into the National Museum of Racing and Hall of Fame for his accomplishments in American jump racing.
