= Zaccio =

American Thoroughbred racehorse

- Sire: Lorenzaccio
- Grandsire: Klairon
- Dam: Delray Dancer
- Damsire: Chateaugay
- Sex: Stallion
- Foaled: March 26, 1976
- Died: September 19, 2007
- Country: United States
- Color: chestnut
- Breeder: Blue Bear Stud
- Owner: Lewis C. Murdock
- Trainer: W. Burling Cocks
- Record: 42: 22–7–3
- Earnings: $288,124

Major wins
- Pillar Steeplechase Stakes (1980); Midsummer Steeplechase Handicap (1980); Indian River Steeplechase Stakes (1980); Lovely Night Steeplechase Handicap (1980); New York Turf Writers Cup Steeplechase Handicap (1980, 1982); Grand National Steeplechase Handicap (1981); Noel Laing Steeplechase Handicap (1981); Colonial Cup International Steeplechase Stakes (1981, 1982); Temple Gwathmey Steeplechase Handicap (1982)

Awards
- American Champion Steeplechase Horse (1980, 1981, 1982)

Honors
- United States Racing Hall of Fame inductee (2016)

Zaccio (foaled March 26, 1976 – died September 19, 2007) was a steeplechase racehorse best known for being the American Champion Steeplechase Horse three times from 1980 to 1982 and being inducted into the National Museum of Racing and Hall of Fame.

== Background ==
Zaccio was a bright chestnut with a blaze. His sire was able to beat Ninjinsky II, who was the last horse to win the English Triple Crown. His mother descends from the legendary Native Dancer, who has contributed to loads of other champions. Also he won the Preakness and the Belmont.

== Racing career ==
=== 3-year-old-season ===
Starting his career, Zaccio ran 9 times as a jumper and won 6 of them with 2 placings in maiden/allowance company.

=== 4-year-old-season ===
To start the 80s, he began running in the big jump races. He had 7 wins in 10 races. These included the Midsummer Stp. Handicap, Indian the River Stp. Stakes, Lovely night Stp handicap, and New York Turf Writers Cup. He fell in his last start of the season and did not return for 10 months.

=== 5-year-old-season ===
The year started with 4 straight defeats followed by wins in the American grand national and the Colonial Cup International Stp.

=== 6-year-old season ===
Like the year before, Zaccio started with a losing streak. This time it was 6 straight. He came back with 4 straight wins, ending the season with the Colonial Cup International Stp.

=== 8 year old season ===
After being dormant for 22 months, Zaccio lost twice to begin his return. He won his third attempt and then was retired.

== After retirement ==
Zaccio was inducted into National Museum of Racing and Hall of Fame in 1990. He enjoyed a wonderful retirement and was ridden out with the Essex Fox Hounds for years, much to his jockeys' enjoyment. He was euthanized because of complications from the infirmities of old age on September 19, 2007.

== Pedigree ==
Pedigree of Zaccio
Sire Lorenzaccio	Klairon	Clarion	Djebel
Sire Lorenzaccio	Klairon	Clarion	Columba
Sire Lorenzaccio	Klairon	Kalmia	Kantar
Sire Lorenzaccio	Klairon	Kalmia	Sweet Lavender
Sire Lorenzaccio	Phoenissa	The Phoenix	Chateau Bouscau
Sire Lorenzaccio	Phoenissa	The Phoenix	Fille De Poete
Sire Lorenzaccio	Phoenissa	Erica Fragrans	Big Game
Sire Lorenzaccio	Phoenissa	Erica Fragrans	Jennydang
Dam Delray Dancer	Chateaugay	Swaps	Khaled
Dam Delray Dancer	Chateaugay	Swaps	Iron Reward
Dam Delray Dancer	Chateaugay	Banquet Bell	Polynesian*
Dam Delray Dancer	Chateaugay	Banquet Bell	Dinner Horn
Dam Delray Dancer	Art Dancer	Native Dancer	Polynesian*
Dam Delray Dancer	Art Dancer	Native Dancer	Geisha
Dam Delray Dancer	Art Dancer	Parlo	Heliopolis
Dam Delray Dancer	Art Dancer	Parlo	Fairy Palace

* Zaccio is inbred 4D x 4D to the stallion Polynesian, meaning that he appears fourth generation twice on the dam side of his pedigree.

== See also ==
- List of racehorses
