= Maskette =

American-bred Thoroughbred racehorse

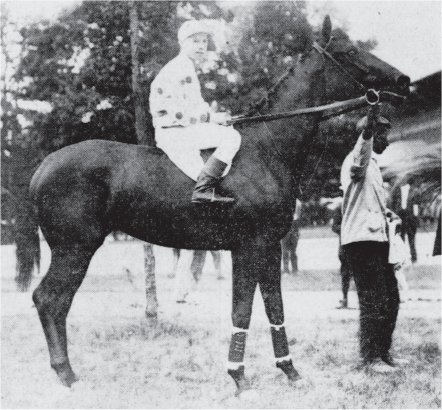
- Maskette in 1908.
- Sire: Disguise
- Grandsire: Domino
- Dam: Biturica
- Damsire: Hamburg
- Sex: Filly
- Foaled: 1906
- Country: United States
- Color: Brown
- Breeder: James R. Keene
- Owner: James R. Keene
- Trainer: James G. Rowe Sr.
- Record: 17: 12-3-0
- Earnings: $77,090

Major wins
- Futurity Stakes (1908); Spinaway Stakes (1908); Matron Stakes (1908); Alabama Stakes (1909); Gazelle Handicap (1909); Ladies Handicap (1909); Mermaid Stakes (1909); Pierrepont Handicap (1909)

Awards
- American Champion Two-Year-Old Filly (1908); American Champion Three-Year-Old Filly (1909)

Honors
- United States Racing Hall of Fame (2001); Maskette Stakes (1954-1991)
- Last updated on April 18, 2020

Maskette (1906–1930) was an American Thoroughbred Hall of Fame racehorse who never lost a race against other fillies.

== Background ==
Bred by James R. Keene at his Castleton Farm near Lexington, Kentucky, Maskette was trained by future Hall of Fame inductee James G. Rowe Sr.

== Racing career ==
Although she did not begin racing until late in the summer of 1908, the New York-based two-year-old was nonetheless the top filly in the U.S. that year. Of her six starts, she finished second once and won the other five races, including setting a track record for the Saratoga Race Course in winning the Spinaway Stakes, a premier event of the racing season for juvenile fillies. The most important win of Maskette's racing career came in the 1908 Futurity Stakes at Sheepshead Bay Race Track. She defeated both male and female competition in the Futurity which for decades was the richest and most prestigious race in the United States.

The leading filly again at age three, Maskette repeated with five wins and a second in six starts. Of her several major stakes race wins, she captured the Pierrepont Handicap against colts. At age four, she won two of five starts that included another track record, this time at Aqueduct Racetrack.

== Stud record ==
Retired to broodmare duty at her owner's Castleton Farm near Lexington, Kentucky, after producing a filly in 1912 Maskette was sold to prominent American owner/breeder William Kissam Vanderbilt, who shipped her to his Haras du Quesnay breeding farm near Deauville in Lower Normandy, France. Maskette produced four stakes winners before her death at age twenty-four in 1930.

== Honors ==
In 1954, Belmont Park in Elmont, New York honored her memory with the Maskette Stakes, a race for fillies & mares 3-years-old & up. In 1992, the race was renamed for its ill-fated 1990 winner, Go For Wand.

In 2001, Maskette was inducted into the United States' National Museum of Racing and Hall of Fame.

== Pedigree ==
Pedigree of Maskette, brown mare, 1908
Sire Disguise	Domino	Himyar	Alarm
Sire Disguise	Domino	Himyar	Hira
Sire Disguise	Domino	Mannie Gray	Enquirer
Sire Disguise	Domino	Mannie Gray	Lizzie G
Sire Disguise	Bonnie Gal	Galopin	Vedette
Sire Disguise	Bonnie Gal	Galopin	Flying Dutchess
Sire Disguise	Bonnie Gal	Bonnie Doon	Rapid Rhone
Sire Disguise	Bonnie Gal	Bonnie Doon	Queen Mary
Dam Biturica	Hamburg	Hanover	Hindoo
Dam Biturica	Hamburg	Hanover	Bourbon Belle
Dam Biturica	Hamburg	Lady Reel	Fellowcraft
Dam Biturica	Hamburg	Lady Reel	Mannie Gray
Dam Biturica	Berriedale	Donovan	Galopin
Dam Biturica	Berriedale	Donovan	Mowerina
Dam Biturica	Berriedale	Caithness	Bend Or
Dam Biturica	Berriedale	Caithness	Atalanta (family: 8-h)
