= Lecomte (horse) =

American Thoroughbred horse (1850–1857)

- Lecomte, by Henri Delattre, 1856
- Sire: Boston
- Grandsire: Timoleon
- Dam: Reel
- Damsire: Glencoe I
- Sex: Stallion
- Foaled: May 1, 1850 (Note: Antebellum Southern horses had a standard birthday of May 1.); Kentucky
- Died: October 7, 1857; England
- Country: United States (to 1856); England (1856–1857)
- Color: Chestnut
- Breeder: Thomas Jefferson Wells
- Owner: Thomas Jefferson Wells; Montfort Wells
- Trainer: Hark West
- Jockey: Abe Hawkins
- Record: 17; 11–4–1
- Earnings: $12,360 ($427,082 in 2026)

Major wins
- Metairie Jockey Club Purse, April 8, 1854, v. Lexington

Honors
- Lecomte Stakes (est. 1943); Fair Grounds Racing Hall of Fame (1971); U.S. Racing Hall of Fame (2024)

Lecomte (pronounced "lacount", May 1, 1850 – October 7, 1857), known as the Slayer of Lexington, was a racehorse that was active in the Louisiana horseracing circuit. A Thoroughbred sired by Boston to the dam Reel, Lecomte had a strong racing career, most famously beating the previously undefeated Lexington, his paternal half-brother and rival, and was simultaneous holder of the national 1-mile and 4-mile heat records in 1855.

== Background ==
Lecomte was a chestnut stallion, standing 15 hands 3 inches with a 23-foot stride, with one hind white sock. He was foaled by breeder Thomas Jefferson Wells, who co-owned Lecomte with his older brother, Montfort, at his property in Kentucky. When Lecomte was a yearling, he was moved to Wells' Wellswood & Dentley estates in Meeker, Louisiana, to be trained by enslaved trainer Hark West.

Lecomte's name was chosen by Wells in honor of Ambrose Lecomte, a planter from Natchitoches and fellow member of the Louisiana Jockey Club. The idiosyncratic pronunciation of his name as "lacount" is ascribed to a mispronunciation by Wells' young daughter, which was carried through to his racing career.

== Career ==
Letterpress of Lecomte in Spirit of the Times, April 11, 1876

=== Early career ===
Lecomte's debut was on April 5, 1853, at Metairie Race Course in New Orleans, where he won both heats and set a 1-mile heat national record of 1:45.5. He won at Pharsalia Race Course of Mississippi in November 1853, and thrice more at Metairie, maintaining a perfect record.

=== Rivalry with Lexington ===
Lecomte was a rival of Lexington, his half-brother through Boston. Both horses had undefeated win streaks at year's start of 1854. Wells was also personal rivals with Lexington's owner, Richard Ten Broeck, a New Yorker; their rivalries were entrenched respectively as a microcosm of the rivalry of the slave states and free states.

The rivalry was first played out in the Great State Post Stakes at Metairie Race Course, an event Ten Broeck arranged to have participating horse represent the contemporary major horseracing states: Lexington represented his native Kentucky, but Lecomte represented Mississippi, as Ten Broeck had already entered Lexington's stablemate Arrow to represent Louisiana. The event was held on April 1, 1854. The Lexington-Lecomte showdown was cast as a "North v. South" event that drew 20,000 attendees from across the country, including former US President Millard Fillmore attending as a race judge. The race was a flat race in 4-mile heats, first to two wins. Lexington won the event in two heats, with Lecomte in second for both.

Lexington and Lecomte rematched the following week for the Metairie Jockey Club Purse at the same course, under the same race format. Lecomte won the purse in two heats, setting a 7:26 track record on the first, beating Fashion's 1842 record; it was Lexington's first and only defeat, and gave Lecomte the moniker, "Slayer of Lexington". Lexington broke Lecomte's record afterward in an April 2, 1855 exhibition match. The rivals rematched one final time on April 14, 1855, where Lexington won the first heat in a race record; Wells withdrew Lecomte and conceded the race to avoid straining the horse.

=== Later career and death ===
Lecomte ran more races in 1855, but was ultimately put on sale as Wells' health declined and he sought to divest. Ten Broeck bought Lecomte for $10,000 ($358,333 in 2026), and sent him to breeder Elisha Warfield's stud farm in Lexington, Kentucky, while he was on rest for leg issues: he sired eight foals, notably siring Umpire with Lexington's dam, Alice Carneal. Later in 1856, Ten Broeck sent Lecomte with his maternal half-sister Prioress to England to compete in English horse racing; he developed pneumonia from the passage across the Atlantic. He ultimately started at the Warwick Racecourse on September 3, 1857, but came last as he developed lameness. Lecomte ultimately succumbed to horse colic and died in England on October 7, 1857; his final record was 11–4–1 from 17 starts, with total earnings of $12,360 ($427,082 in 2026).

== Legacy ==
Lecompte, Louisiana, was named in Lecomte's honor, though the spelling was changed. The Lecomte Stakes, inaugurated in 1943 in New Orleans, was also named in his honor.

Lecomte was inducted into the U.S. Racing Hall of Fame in 2024. Lecomte was the focus of a 2024 museum exhibit at the Alexandria Museum of Art, the centerpiece of which was an 1856 equine portrait of him by Henri Delattre, on loan from the Jockey Club.
