= Joe Aitcheson Jr. =

American jockey

Personal information
- Born: July 31, 1928 Olney, Maryland, United States
- Died: May 24, 2014 (aged 85) Westminster, Maryland, United States
- Occupation: Jockey

Horse racing career
- Sport: Horse racing
- Career wins: 478

Honors
- U.S. Racing Hall of Fame (1978)

Significant horses
- Amber Diver, Bon Nouvel, Peal; Tuscalee, Top Bid, Soothsayer

Joseph Leiter Aitcheson Jr. (July 31, 1928 in Olney, Maryland - May 24, 2014 in Westminster, Maryland) was an American steeplechase jockey who won a record 440 timber races and was inducted into the National Museum of Racing and Hall of Fame in 1978.

== Early life ==
Aitcheson's father, Joe Sr., who went by his middle name Leiter, also pitched for the Baltimore Orioles in the minor leagues and the Brooklyn Dodgers in the majors, helped his brother Whitney found the Iron Bridge Hounds, serving as its Master of Foxhounds for many years. Introduced to the saddle at age 3, Aitcheson later worked weekends at his uncle Whitney's riding stables, cleaning barns and guiding trail rides.

After high school, he enrolled at the University of Maryland, lasting one semester. Aitcheson enlisted in the United States Navy, serving four years during the Korean War as a gunner's mate on the aircraft carrier USS Oriskany.

Upon his discharge, Aitcheson returned to Maryland and applied for his professional steeplechase jockey's license.

== Racing career ==
Aitcheson retired as the winningest steeplechase jockey in history, posting 440 jump wins from 2,457 mounts over a career spanning more than two decades, exceeding the next highest career total by almost ten percent (42 more than Alfred P. "Paddy" Smithwick.) In addition, Aitcheson holds the single season jump wins record of 40.

Aitcheson won eight Virginia Gold Cups, seven Carolina Cups, and six International Gold Cups, also clinching five Temple Gwathmeys, five Noel Laings, five Midsummers and five Manlys.

The National Steeplechase Association has maintained, since 1956, a list of annual leading jockeys by races won. Aitcheson has won more titles than any other jockey, 7. He took his first national steeplechase riding title in 1961, adding two more in 1963 and 1964. Doug Small and Tommy Walsh upended his reign in 1965 and 1966, respectively, but Aitcheson took four consecutive titles between 1967 through 1970. Aitcheson rode many of his era's national champions including Peal (1961), Amber Diver (1963), Bon Nouvel (1964, 1965, 1968), Tuscalee (1966), Top Bid (1970) and Soothsayer (1972).

In 1976, he became the only professional jockey to receive the National Steeplechase Association's F. Ambrose Clark Award for lifetime service to the sport. Aitcheson was named the Maryland Horse Council's Horseman of the Year for 2006.

He was inducted in the Hall of Fame in 1978.

== Career at a glance ==
- Years Active: 1957–1977
- Number of Mounts: 2,457
- Number of Winners: 478
- Winning Percentage: 19.5%

=== Principal races won ===
- 8 Virginia Gold Cups
- 7 Carolina Cups
- 6 International Gold Cups
- 5 Temple Gwathmeys
- 5 Noel Laing Steeplechases
- 5 Midsummer Steeplechases
- 5 Manly Steeplechases
- 2 Colonial Cups
