= Thomas Jefferson Wells =

American politician (1806–1863)

Member of the Louisiana House of Representatives from the Rapides Parish district
- In office 1841–1843

Personal details
- Born: January 30, 1806 Alexandria, Louisiana
- Died: July 15, 1863 (aged 57) Hempstead, Texas
- Resting place: Hempstead, Texas
- Party: Whig Party, 1841-1843; Democratic Party, 1859
- Spouse: Martha Lucie Dent (m. 1829)
- Children: None
- Parents: Samuel Levi Wells II; Mary Elizabeth Calvit
- Relatives: James Madison Wells, brother; Montfort Wells, brother; Samuel Levi Wells III, brother
- Education: Transylvania College
- Occupation: Planter, horse breeder

Military service
- Allegiance: State of Louisiana
- Branch/service: Louisiana Militia
- Years of service: 1854-
- Rank: Brigadier General
- Unit: 4th Division
- Horse racing career
- Sport: Horse racing

Major racing wins
- Metairie Jockey Club Purse, April 8th, 1854

Honors
- Fair Grounds Racing Hall of Fame, 2000

Significant horses
- Lecomte; Reel; Prioress

Thomas Jefferson Wells (January 30th, 1806 - July 15th, 1863) was a planter, horse breeder, militia leader, and politician in Louisiana.

== Early life ==
Wells was born on January 30th, 1806 to Samuel Levi Wells II and Mary Elizabeth Calvit, his second wife, at New Hope Plantation outside Alexandria, Louisiana. He attended Transylvania College in Lexington, Kentucky, gaining an appreciation for animal husbandry from Shakertown.

== Career ==
Wells was a planter at the Dentley & Wellswood plantations in Meeker, Louisiana along with his brother Montfort; Montfort was the primary owner of Wellswood and handled crops, while Wells focused on animal husbandry and horse breeding at Dentley.

The brothers purchased the mare Reel from James Jackson in Alabama, who he campaign on a successful racing career. Wells foaled Lecomte and Prioress from Reel, who both had successful racing careers.

Wells developed a rivalry with the owner of the Metairie Race Course, Richard Ten Broeck. Ten Broeck challenged Wells' Lecomte to race his horse Lexington on April 1st, 1954. Lexington won, but Wells demanded a rematch due to rainy conditions: a week later, Lecomte and Lexington raced again, and Lecomte won, for Lexington's only career defeat. The rivalry continued through to a final race on April 14th, 1855, which Lexington won. Over the course of the feud, Wells built a faction within the Metairie Race Course Association, which ultimately pressured Ten Broeck in 1856 to divest from the race course and established Wells as association head. Despite their rivalry, Wells ultimately sold Lecomte and Prioress to Ten Broeck that same year, the former for $10,000 ($345,536 in 2026).

Wells foaled War Dance in 1859 from Reel and Lexington, and promptly sold him as a yearling to Kentucky horse breeder Alexander Keene Richards for $5000 in gold ($172,768 in 2026). However, following the Ordinance of Secession, Richards fled to Louisiana and stabled War Dance at Wellswood. Wells was a supporter of the secession of Louisiana, and remained in the state until the 1862 Capture of New Orleans, which drove him to flee to another property of his in Texas, bringing Wellswoods' horse stock with him. He bred War Dance, the only Thoroughbred stallion he had in Texas, to a Lecomte mare, foaling the mare Lizzie G.

=== Political career ===
Wells was a representative of Rapides Parish in the Louisiana House of Representatives from 1841-1843, as a member of the Whigs.

Following the mid-1950s collapse of the Whig party, Wells ran as a Democrat in the 1859 Louisiana gubernatorial election opposing Thomas Overton Moore. Both were Democrats, but Moore was a Jacksonian Democrat nominated by the majority faction of John Slidell, while Wells was backed by the minority faction of Pierre Soulé, and was endorsed by the Know Nothing Party. Moore won the election with 62% of the vote, and won the plurality in 46 of 48 parishes.

=== Militia career ===
Following the 1853 reorganization of Louisiana Militia, Wells was appointed as a brigadier general of the Fourth Division alongside Alfred Mouton by Governor Paul Octave Hébert, under Major-General Louis Gustave De Russy. He was referred to by the honorific "General" into his gubernatorial run.

== Personal life ==
On September 19th, 1827, Wells supported his brother Samuel L. Wells III in his duel against Dr. Thomas H. Maddox, ultimately participating in the ensuing Sandbar Fight on the side of his brother and James Bowie.

Wells married Martha Lucie Dent, sister to his brother Montfort's wife, Jeanette Amelia, in 1829. Martha Lucie suffered a horse-riding injury a year later and was permanently disabled; they had no children.

Wells died on July 15th, 1863 in Hempstead, Texas, where he was buried.
