= Dooley Adams =

American jockey

Frank David “Dooley” Adams (1927, Port Chester, New York – November 12, 2004 in Southern Pines, North Carolina) was an American steeplechase jockey who was inducted into the National Museum of Racing and Hall of Fame in 1970.

== Early life ==
Adams lived for a time in Connecticut where his father, Frank, was the manager and huntsman of the Watertown Hunt. The family moved to the San Diego, California area in the late 1930s. He rode his first winner in 1941 at age 14 at Agua Caliente in Mexico, where his mother Clara Adams, trained thoroughbreds for flat and steeplechase racing.

The family returned East in the mid-1940s, settling in Southern Pines, North Carolina.

== Racing career ==
Adams gained fame as a steeplechase jockey, winning 301 races and garnering seven National Steeplechase Association championships including five consecutive championships (1951–55) during a career that lasted from 1941-1956. The win total ranks third historically in United States steeplechase victories. Adams three times won more than 30 races in a year, a benchmark for U.S. jump jockeys. In 1954, Adams won a record 38 races. The total has been surpassed just once, when fellow Hall of Famer Joe Aitcheson took 40 victories in 1964.

Among the horses ridden by Adams were champions Neji, Elkridge, Oedipus, and Ancestor. Oedipus was inducted into the Hall of Fame in 1978.

The thoroughbred Refugio is most closely associated with Adams. Purchased by his parents for $300, the California-bred won on the flat and over jumps at Agua Caliente and was a competitive jumper on the U.S. circuit with a third-place finish in the 1946 American Grand National. Adams entered the horse in the Grand National, and was one of 57 starters in the 1947 English Grand National. With Adams up, Refugio finished seventh in a competition where 40 horses failed to complete the course. The Adams family farm was later named after the horse.

Adams was a multiple winner of several major races, including four wins in the Saratoga Steeplechase Handicap and Beverwyck Steeplechase Handicap, three wins in the Brook National Steeplechase Handicap, the Harbor Hill Steeplechase Handicap and the Temple Gwathmey, and two wins in the American Grand National Steeplechase.

Retiring from steeplechase racing at age 29, Adams was inducted into the National Museum of Racing Hall of Fame in 1970.

== Family ==
Adams was survived by a son, Frank Michael Adams; a daughter, Melissa Adams; a sister, Joan W. Ketcham; and four grandchildren, Ashley Jordan, Courtney Jordan, Rowdie-Jo Adams and Jett Adams.

The paddock at the Stoneybrook race course in the Carolina Horse Park in Raeford, North Carolina was posthumously named in Adams honor.

Adams is buried at Refugio Farm, on Youngs Road Southern Pines.

== Riding career ==
- Years Active: 1944-1956
- Number of Mounts: 1,312
- Number of Winners: 337
- Winning Percentage: 25.7%
