= Franklin Brooke Voss =

American painter

Franklin Brooke Voss's Famous American Thoroughbreds (1934-1940). Top row, left to right: Man o' War, Twenty Grand, Equipoise, Billy Barton. Middle row, left to right: Blue Larkspur, Sun Beau, Jolly Roger, Exterminator. Bottom row, left to right: Top Flight, Gallant Fox, Discovery, Seabiscuit.

Franklin Brooke Voss (1880–1953) was an American painter.

== Biography ==
Franklin Brooke Voss was born in New York City in 1880. He attended the Art Students League of New York, where George Bridgman was his teacher.

He was commissioned paintings by the Whitneys, Riddles, Vanderbilts, Phippses, Wideners, and Willis Sharpe Kilmer. He painted Man o' War, Equipoise, Seabiscuit, War Admiral, Sir Barton and Whirlaway. Some of his work can be found at the Museum of Polo and Hall of Fame in Lake Worth, Florida.

== Bibliography ==
- Peter Winants, The Sporting Art of Franklin B. Voss (Eclipse Press, 2005)
