= Cap and Bells (horse) =

American-bred Thoroughbred racehorse

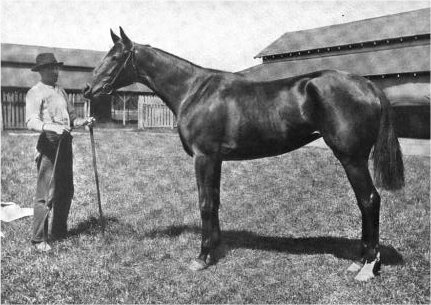
- Cap and Bells in 1902.
- Sire: Domino
- Grandsire: Himyar
- Dam: Ben-My-Chree
- Damsire: Galopin
- Sex: Mare
- Foaled: 1898
- Country: United States
- Colour: Bay or brown
- Breeder: James R. Keene & Foxhall Keene
- Owner: Foxhall Keene; James W. Corrigan
- Trainer: James G. Rowe Sr. Sam Darling

Major wins
- Criterion Stakes (1900); Spinster Stakes (1900); Oaks Stakes (1901)

Cap and Bells (known in England as Cap and Bells II, 1898 – after 1916) was an American-bred Thoroughbred racehorse and broodmare. After showing promising form in the United States as a juvenile in 1900 she was set to race in England. In June 1901 on her British debut she recorded an extraordinary win in the Epsom Oaks, becoming the first American horse to do so. She never recaptured her Epsom form and was retired from racing in 1903. After returning to United States she had some success as a broodmare.

== Background ==
Cap and Bells was a bay or brown mare bred in Kentucky by the father and son partnership of James R. Keene and Foxhall Keene the latter of whom owned her during her racing career. She was initially sent into training in the United States.

She was from the second of only two crops of foals sired by Domino, an outstanding American racehorse who died in 1897 at the age of six. Her dam, the British-bred mare Ben-My-Chree, was a daughter of Ulster Queen, making her a close relative of Louvois (2000 Guineas) and Louviers (runner-up in the Epsom Derby).

== Racing career ==
=== 1900: two-year-old season ===
On June 4, Cap and Bells won the Criterion Stakes Gravesend Race Track under jockey Henry Spencer. At Brighton Beach Race Course on 24 July, she won the Spinster Stakes, beating favourite Sweet Lavender "with ease". On 25 August, the filly was stepped up in class for the Belmont Futurity Stakes, which at that time was the most important race for two-year-olds in the United States. She led the field until the home but faded down the stretch and finished unplaced behind W. C. Whitney's Ballyhoo Bey. Shortly after the race, it was announced that Keene intended to campaign his filly in England in 1901.

=== 1901: three-year-old season ===
On her arrival in England, Cap and Bells entered training with Sam Darling at his stable at Beckhampton in Wiltshire.

On 7 June, ridden by American jockey Milton Henry, she was one of twenty-one fillies to contest the 123rd running of the Oaks Stakes over one and a half miles at Epsom Racecourse. The race was run in fine weather in front of a near-record crowd. Despite her lack of experience on the surface (turf) and the distance, she was made the 9/4 favourite, with Lord Derby's filly Santa Brigida (third in the 1000 Guineas) the only one of her opponents to start at less than 10/1. She had not been among the favourites in the build-up but was heavily backed on the morning of the race. The favourite's stablemate Noonday set the pace and led the field into the straight, but Cap and Bells went to the front soon after and drew away to win "in a canter" by six lengths. Lord Ellesmere's 50/1 outsider Sabrinetta (ridden by the American C Jenkins) finished second, with three lengths back to Minnie Dee (owned by Richard Croker and ridden by another American, Lester Reiff) in third place. According to the Los Angeles Herald "the race furnished extraordinary proof of the superior ability of American breeders, trainers and jockeys". Foxhall Keene donated the prize-money to British and American charities, including the Prince of Wales's Hospital Fund.

Later that year, Keene reportedly declined an offer to match his filly against W. C. Whitney's Epsom Derby winner Volodyovski.

=== 1902: four-year-old season ===
Cap and Bells remained in training as a four-year-old but failed to recover her best form. In the Gold Cup at Royal Ascot in June, she finished tailed-off in last place behind William the Third. Cap and Bells returned to the United States in 1903.

== Assessment and honours ==
In their book, A Century of Champions, based on the Timeform rating system, John Randall and Tony Morris rated Cap and Bells a "superior" winner of the Oaks.

== Breeding record ==
At the end of her racing career, Cap and Bells was retired to become a broodmare for the Keenes' stud. She produced at least eight foals between 1905 and 1916:

- Pink And Blue, a brown filly, foaled in 1905, sired by Kingston
- Wamba, bay colt, 1906, by Ben Brush. Won fourteen races in England.
- Sapphire, bay filly, 1907, by Star Ruby
- Jest, brown filly, 1908, by Ben Brush. Winner.
- Junina, brown filly, 1909, by Delhi
- Boots And Saddle, chestnut colt, 1911, by Voter
- Capra, chestnut filly, 1912, by Ballot. Stakes winner.
- Featherwit, brown filly, 1916, by Colin

== Pedigree ==
Pedigree of Cap and Bells (USA), bay or brown mare, 1898
Sire Domino (GB) 1891	Himyar (USA); 1875	Alarm	Eclipse (GB)
Sire Domino (GB) 1891	Himyar (USA); 1875	Alarm	Maud (GB)
Sire Domino (GB) 1891	Himyar (USA); 1875	Hira	Lexington
Sire Domino (GB) 1891	Himyar (USA); 1875	Hira	Hegira
Sire Domino (GB) 1891	Mannie Gray (USA); 1874	Enquirer	Leamington (GB)
Sire Domino (GB) 1891	Mannie Gray (USA); 1874	Enquirer	Lida
Sire Domino (GB) 1891	Mannie Gray (USA); 1874	Lizzie G	War Dance
Sire Domino (GB) 1891	Mannie Gray (USA); 1874	Lizzie G	Lecomte mare
Dam Ben-My-Chree (GB) 1887	Galopin (GB); 1872	Vedette	Voltigeur
Dam Ben-My-Chree (GB) 1887	Galopin (GB); 1872	Vedette	Mrs Ridgway
Dam Ben-My-Chree (GB) 1887	Galopin (GB); 1872	Flying Duchess	The Flying Dutchman
Dam Ben-My-Chree (GB) 1887	Galopin (GB); 1872	Flying Duchess	Merope
Dam Ben-My-Chree (GB) 1887	Ulster Queen (GB); 1879	Uncas	Stockwell
Dam Ben-My-Chree (GB) 1887	Ulster Queen (GB); 1879	Uncas	Nightingale (IRE)
Dam Ben-My-Chree (GB) 1887	Ulster Queen (GB); 1879	Pirate Queen	Buccaneer
Dam Ben-My-Chree (GB) 1887	Ulster Queen (GB); 1879	Pirate Queen	Queen of the May (Family: 1-s)
