= Tuscalee =

American Thoroughbred racehorse

- Sire: Tuscany
- Grandsire: The Rhymer
- Dam: Verna Lee
- Damsire: British Buddy
- Sex: Gelding
- Foaled: 1960
- Country: United States
- Colour: Bay
- Breeder: Alfred H. Smith Sr.
- Owner: Alfred H. Smith Sr.
- Trainer: Leiter Aitcheson
- Record: 89: 39-14-10
- Earnings: US$130,917

Major wins
- Fair Hill Steeplechase (1966); Georgetown Steeplechase (1966, 1967); Manly Steeplechase (1966); Midsummer Hurdle Handicap (1966); Noel Laing Steeplechase (1966); Piedmont Hunt Cup (1966); Tom Roby Steeplechase (1966); Indian River Steeplechase (1967, 1968); Meadow Brook Hurdle Stakes (1967); Clark Cup Steeplechase (1968); National Hunt Cup Steeplchase (1966, 1969, 1972)

Awards
- United States Co-Champion Steeplechaser (1966)

Honors
- U.S. Racing Hall of Fame (2013); Maryland Thoroughbred Hall of Fame (2014)

Tuscalee (foaled 1960) was an American Thoroughbred racehorse that competed in both flat racing and steeplechase events from 1962 through 1972 for owner and breeder Alfred H. Smith Sr. The gelded son of Tuscany began his career racing on the flat with only modest success but as a steeplechase competitor became a National Champion in 1966 and finish his career having won more American steeplechase races than any horse in history. Tuscalee would be inducted into the U. S. Racing Hall of Fame and the Maryland Thoroughbred Hall of Fame. As at 2018, Tuscalee's American record of 37 Steeplechase wins still stands.

== Background ==
Tuscalee was a bay gelding born in 1960. He stood 15.3 hands (63 inches, 160 cm) in height, and ran for 9 years in total. His sire was Tuscany, a multiple stakes winning horse whose wins included the Rumson Handicap, Toboggan Handicap and the Salvator Mile Handicap.

== Racing career ==
=== Flat career ===
He started his racing career as a flat racing horse, but only won once in 8 flat races as a 3-year-old. After winning a second time as a 4-year-old, he was switched to steeplechase racing under the care of trainer Leiter Aitcheson.

=== Steeplechase career ===
Tuscalee had 7 steeplechase victories in his 4-year-old-season, 2 wins as a 5-year-old and 10 wins as a 6-year-old. To this day, his third steeplechase season is still a record for the most wins in a season for a steeplechaser. For the rest of his career, he performed more moderately. His career ended at the age of 12 when he won his 4th and final National Hunt Cup, giving him his 37th steeplechase victory and his 39th overall victory.

== After retirement ==
Tuscalee was inducted into United States Racing Hall of Fame in 2013.

== See also ==
- List of racehorses
