= Domino (horse) =

American-bred Thoroughbred racehorse

- Domino in the 1893 Futurity Stakes at Sheepshead Bay Race Track
- Sire: Himyar
- Grandsire: Alarm
- Dam: Mannie Gray
- Damsire: Enquirer
- Sex: Stallion
- Foaled: 1891
- Died: 1897 (aged 5–6)
- Country: United States
- Color: Dark Brown
- Breeder: Barak G. Thomas
- Owner: James R. Keene & Foxhall Keene
- Trainer: William Lakeland
- Record: 25: 19–2–1
- Earnings: $193,550

Major wins
- Great American Stakes (1893); Great Eclipse Stakes (1893); Matron Stakes (1893); Futurity Stakes (1893); Great Trial Stakes (1893); Hyde Park Stakes (1893); Withers Mile (1894); Culver Handicap (1894); Flying Handicap (1894); Ocean Handicap (1894); Coney Island Handicap (1895); Sheepshead Bay Handicap (1895)

Awards
- American Champion Two-Year-Old Colt (1893); United States Horse of the Year (1893)

Honors
- United States Racing Hall of Fame (1955)
- Last updated on March 12, 2010

Domino (1891–1897) was a 19th-century American thoroughbred race horse.

== Background ==
A dark brown, almost black, colt, Domino was sired by Himyar out of the mare Mannie Gray. Sam Hildreth writes in his book The Spell of the Turf that the colt looked black but was actually a deep chestnut. Himyar was out of speed horse Alarm who'd inherited this speed from the great Eclipse. Domino, who also inherited that speed, was foaled at Major Barak Thomas's Dixiana Farm in Lexington, Kentucky. What he did not have was stamina.

Owned by James R. Keene, he was purchased as a yearling for $3,000 by his son, Foxhall Keene. Domino was trained by William Lakeland and ridden by jockey Fred Taral, whom Domino hated for his rough style and copious use of the whip and spur.

== Racing career ==
=== 1893: two-year-old season ===
At the age of two, Domino won the Great Eclipse Stakes, Great American Stakes, Great Trial Stakes, Hyde Park Stakes, Matron Stakes, Monmouth Park Produce Stakes, and the prestigious Futurity Stakes.

The Futurity Stakes marked the beginning of his hatred for Taral. During the running, Domino's stablemate fell, and Domino, trying to avoid him, nearly went down as well. Taral whipped Domino mercilessly as a result, and then, when a colt named Dobbins challenged him, Taral went for the whip again. A newspaper article described the race as follows:

"Once, twice, thrice, the lash descended on Domino's quivering flanks, but still Dobbins crept nearer and nearer...A furlong from home Dobbins' muzzle showed ahead. Taral shifted his whip from his right to his left hand and played a tattoo on Domino's ribs that could be heard half a mile away. His heels were busy, and Domino's sides ran blood...The game colt that had never known defeat, struggled on, and 100 yards from the finish there was not a man alive capable of predicting the winner."

By now, people called Domino "The Black Whirlwind". About this time, heats no longer dominated horse races in America (they'd fallen out of favor in England decades earlier), and speed was becoming a premium. Domino was considered the fastest sprinter of his time.

=== 1894: three-year-old season ===
In his first start at age three in the Withers Stakes, Domino defeated Belmont Stakes champion Henry of Navarre and won five of the next seven races he entered, including a dead heat with arch rival Henry of Navarre in a match race sometimes referred to as the Third Special. They met again three weeks later in a race to determine the 1894 championship. For this event, the 4-year-old Clifford joined the two younger colts. This time, Henry of Navarre won by 3/4 length, earning Horse of the Year honors.

At three, besides the Withers, Domino won the Culver and Ocean Handicaps plus the Flying Handicap, in which he carried 130 pounds while setting a track record.

=== 1895: four-year-old season ===
Raced as a four-year-old, Domino won four of eight races: the Coney Island Handicap, the Sheepshead Bay Handicap, and came in 2nd in the Fall Handicap carrying 133 lb., conceding 24 lb to the winner.

Slightly unsound, and always raced in bandages, in his 25 starts, Domino won 19, placed in 2, and came third in one. His lifetime career earnings amounted to $193,550.

Eventually refusing to train due to a bad foot, at the end of the 1895 season, he was retired to Castleton Stud.

== Stud career ==
Domino had produced only twenty foals when at age six (July 29, 1897) he died unexpectedly of spinal meningitis. However, this diagnosis is still disputed. Known for being a gentle but playful horse, Domino would rear and paw the air upon being turned out in his paddock, lending credibility to the claim that he slipped and fell, thus breaking his neck. Despite his short time as a sire, of Domino's twenty foals, eight were stakes race winners, a 42% rate versus the industry norm of just 3%. (Only four colts were not gelded.) Among them was Cap and Bells, the first American-bred to win the Epsom Oaks, and Belmont Stakes winner and two-time Horse of the Year Commando, who in turn sired a number of top horses, one of whom was hall of famer Colin. Today, many thoroughbred race horses trace their lineage to Domino. Some of his most famous descendants were War Admiral, Personal Ensign, Buckpasser, Zenyatta, Secretariat, Seattle Slew, Affirmed, Bold Ruler, Assault, Whirlaway, Gallant Fox, Omaha, Native Dancer, American Pharoah, and Justify. Ten of the 13 Triple Crown winners have Domino in their pedigree.

== Honors ==
Domino was one of the first handful of horses inducted into the National Museum of Racing and Hall of Fame in 1955. His owner had his headstone engraved: "Here lies the fleetest runner the American turf has ever known, and the gamest and most generous of horses."

== Sire line tree ==
- Domino
  - Disguise
    - Helmet
      - Bob Tail
    - Iron Mask
  - Doublet
  - Unmasked
  - Commando
    - Peter Pan
      - Black Toney
        - Black Servant
        - Beau Butler
        - Black Gold
        - Broadway Jones
        - Black Panther
        - Brokers Tip
        - Balladier
        - Bimelech
      - Pennant
        - Bunting
        - Jolly Roger
        - Valorous
        - Equipoise
        - Red Rain
        - Dauber
        - The Chief
        - Maeda
      - Tryster
      - Laurano
      - Croyden
      - Macaw
      - Captain Kettle
      - Peter Hastings
        - Petrose
    - Superman
      - Gladiator
      - Surf Rider
    - Celt
      - Dunboyne
      - Touch Me Not
    - Peter Quince
      - Papp
      - Peter King
    - Colin
      - Gentle Shepherd
      - On Watch
        - Sortie
        - Tick On
        - Observant
        - Time Clock
        - Brazado
      - Jock
      - Neddie
        - Good Goods
        - Nedayr
        - Neds Flying
    - Transvaal
      - Boniface
    - Ultimus
      - Luke McLuke
        - Mr Sponge
      - High Cloud
        - Holyrood
      - High Time
        - Sarazen
        - High Strung
        - Zacaweista
      - Infinite
        - Economic
        - Inshore
        - Inlander
      - Westwick
        - Speculate
      - Stimulus
        - Clang
        - Danger Point
        - Stir Up
      - Supremus
        - Dynastic
  - Kimberley
  - Mardi Gras
  - Olympian
  - The Regent

== Pedigree ==
Pedigree of Domino, Black/Brown, 1891
Sire Himyar	Alarm	Eclipse	Orlando
Sire Himyar	Alarm	Eclipse	Gaze
Sire Himyar	Alarm	Maud	Stockwell
Sire Himyar	Alarm	Maud	Countess of Albemarle
Sire Himyar	Hira	Lexington*	Boston*
Sire Himyar	Hira	Lexington*	Carneal*
Sire Himyar	Hira	Hegira	Ambassador
Sire Himyar	Hira	Hegira	Flight
Dam Mannie Gray	Enquirer	Leamington	Faugh-a-Ballagh
Dam Mannie Gray	Enquirer	Leamington	Pantaloon mare
Dam Mannie Gray	Enquirer	Lida	Lexington*
Dam Mannie Gray	Enquirer	Lida	Lize
Dam Mannie Gray	Lizzie G	War Dance	Lexington*
Dam Mannie Gray	Lizzie G	War Dance	Reel*
Dam Mannie Gray	Lizzie G	Lecomte mare	Lecomte*
Dam Mannie Gray	Lizzie G	Lecomte mare	Edith (family: 23-b)

* Domino is inbred 3S x 4D x 4D to the stallion Lexington, meaning that he appears third generation once on the sire side of his pedigree, and fourth generation twice on the dam side of his pedigree.

* Domino is inbred 4S x 5D x 5D x 5D to the stallion Boston, meaning that he appears fourth generation once on the sire side of his pedigree, and fifth generation thrice (via Lexington twice and Lecomte once) on the dam side of his pedigree.

* Domino is inbred 4D x 5D to the mare Reel, meaning that she appears fourth generation and fifth generation (via Lecomte) on the dam side of his pedigree.
