= National Museum of Racing and Hall of Fame =

Professional sports hall of fame in New York

Coordinates: 43.0763°N 73.7734°W

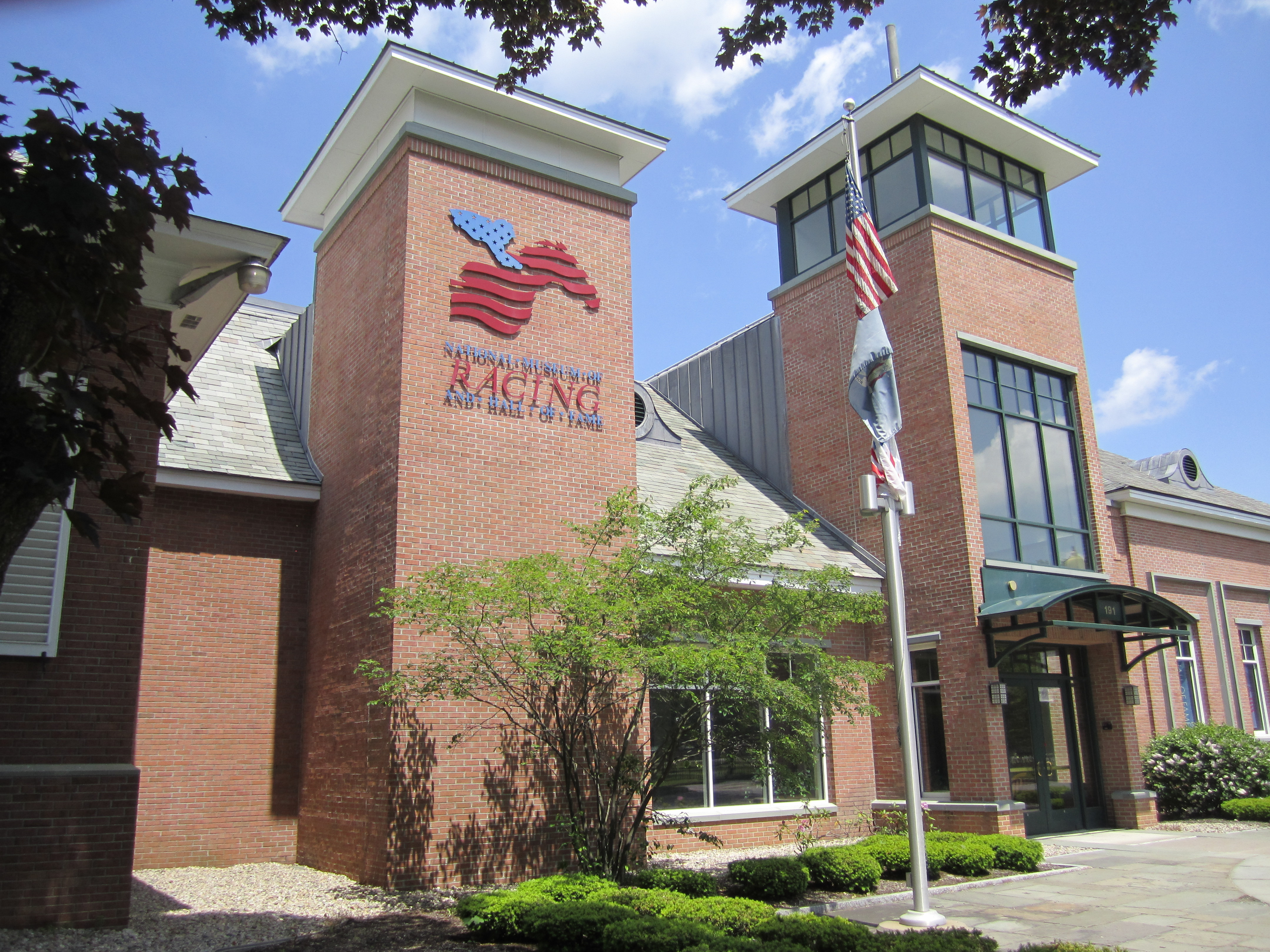
- National Museum of Racing and Hall of Fame
- Established: 1951; 75 years ago
- Location: Saratoga Springs, New York
- Type: Professional sports hall of fame
- Director: Cate Masterson
- Website: racingmuseum.org

The National Museum of Racing and Hall of Fame was founded in 1950 in Saratoga Springs, New York, to honor the achievements of American Thoroughbred race horses, jockeys, and trainers. In 1955, the museum moved to its current location on Union Avenue near Saratoga Race Course, at which time inductions into the hall of fame began. Each spring, following the tabulation of the final votes, the announcement of new inductees is made, usually during Kentucky Derby Week in early May. The actual inductions are held in mid-August during the Saratoga race meeting.

The Hall of Fame's nominating committee selects eight to ten candidates from among the four Contemporary categories (colts and horses, fillies and mares, jockeys and trainers) to be presented to the voters. Changes in voting procedures that commenced with the 2010 candidates allow the voters to choose multiple candidates from a single Contemporary category, instead of a single candidate from each of the four Contemporary categories. For example, in 2016, two mares (Rachel Alexandra and Zenyatta) were inducted at the same time.

The museum also houses a large collection of art, artifacts, and memorabilia that document the history of horse racing from the eighteenth century to the present.

== History ==
The National Museum of Racing was founded in 1950, led by Cornelius Vanderbilt Whitney and a group of people interested in thoroughbred racing. The museum first opened its doors in 1951, at which time it occupied a single room in Saratoga's Canfield Casino. The establishment was supported by the city of Saratoga Springs, which donated $2,500, the Saratoga Racing Association, which donated $5,000, and various patrons of the sport, who also donated various pieces of art and memorabilia. The first item in the museum's collection was a horseshoe worn by the great Lexington.

In 1955, the museum relocated to its current location on Union Avenue, across the street from the main entrance of the historic Saratoga Race Course. The museum was relocated to a newly reconstructed building and a thoroughbred racing Hall of Fame was included. Since then, the museum has expanded several times to allow for the display of its extensive art collection and more multimedia displays on the history of the sport.

== Horses in the Hall of Fame ==
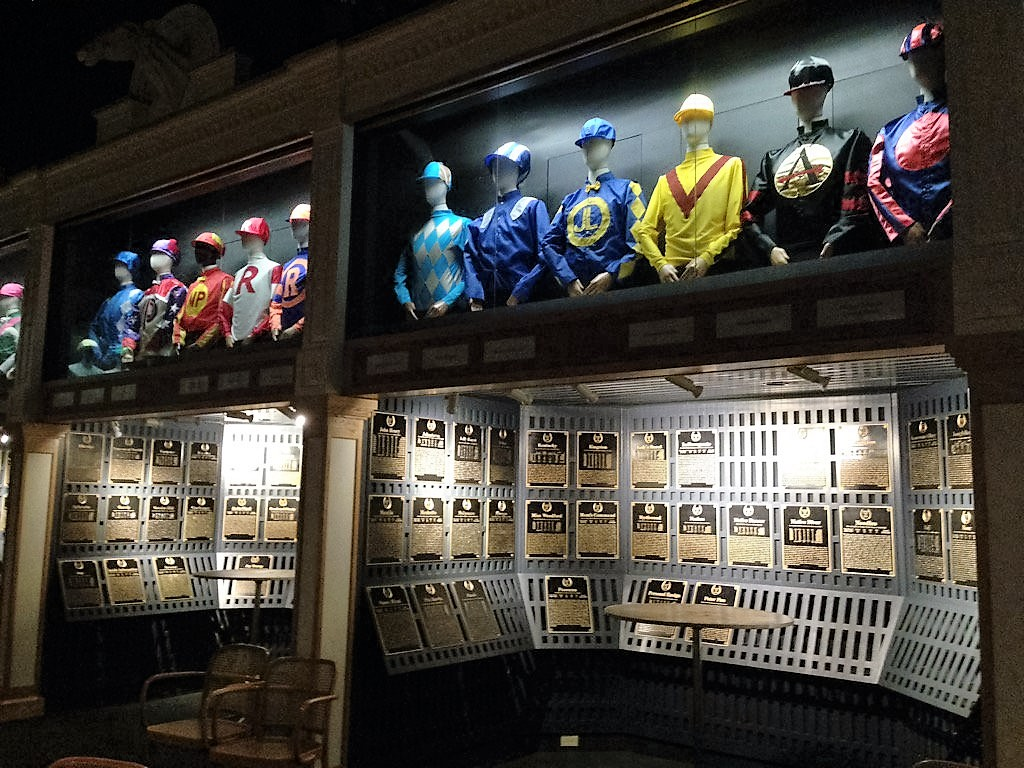
The Hall of Fame gallery at the National Museum of Racing and Hall of Fame in Saratoga

In the early years, inductions to the hall of fame were based on the evaluation of a panel of racing historians. In 1955, a group of nine horses from the earliest years of the American turf were inducted. The 1956 class included 11 horses that raced around the turn of the century, while the 1957 class included 10 horses that raced up to the mid-thirties. Since then, the classes have been significantly smaller as the inductions shifted to more contemporary horses. Under current rules, a horse must have been retired for a minimum of five full calendar years to be eligible for the hall of fame. (Exceptions to this rule have been made; for example, Secretariat was inducted the year after his retirement and Ruffian was inducted the year after her death.) Thoroughbreds remain eligible in the contemporary category between five and 25 calendar years following their final racing year.

After that point, the Historic Review Committee will consider horses, jockeys, and trainers on a triennial basis based on eras in a format similar to the National Baseball Hall of Fame Veterans Committees, on an alternating basis based on eras.

1. Pre-20th Century (next meeting 2027)
2. 20th Century, Pre-1960 (next meeting 2028)
3. Post-1960 (next meeting 2029)

Photo	Name	Inducted	Career years	Starts	Wins
	A.P. Indy	2000	1991–1992	11	8
	Ack Ack	1986	1968–1971	27	19
	Affectionately	1989	1962–1965	52	28
	Affirmed	1980	1977–1979	29	22
	All Along	1990	1981–1984	21	9
	Alsab	1976	1941–1944	51	25
	Alydar	1989	1977–1979	26	14
	Alysheba	1993	1986–1988	26	11
	American Eclipse	1970	1818–1823	8	8
	American Pharoah	2021	2014–2015	11	9
	Ancient Title	2008	1972–1978	57	24
	Aristides	2024	1874–1878	21	9
	Armed	1963	1944–1950	81	41
	Arrogate	2023	2016–2017	11	7
	Artful	1956	1904–1905	8	6
	Arts and Letters	1994	1968–1970	23	11
	Ashado	2014	2003–2005	21	12
	Assault	1964	1945–1950	42	18
	Azeri	2010	2001–2004	24	17
	Battleship (steeplechaser)	1969	1929–1938	55	24
	Bayakoa	1998	1986–1991	39	21
	Bed O' Roses	1976	1949–1952	46	18
	Beholder	2022	2012–2016	26	18
	Beldame	1956	1903–1905	31	17
	Ben Brush	1955	1895–1897	40	25
	Ben Nevis II (steeplechaser)	2009	1976–1980	21	9
	Best Pal	2010	1990–1996	47	18
	Bewitch	1977	1947–1951	55	20
	Billy Kelly	2015	1918–1923	69	39
	Bimelech	1990	1939–1941	15	11
	Black Gold	1989	1923-4; 1927-8	35	18
	Black Helen	1991	1934–1935	22	15
	Blue Larkspur	1957	1928–1930	16	10
	Bold 'n Determined	1997	1979–1981	20	16
	Bold Ruler	1973	1956–1958	33	23
	Bon Nouvel (steeplechaser)	1976	1963–1968	51	16
	Boston	1955	1836–1843	45	40
	Bowl of Flowers	2004	1960–1961	16	10
	Broomstick	1956	1903–1905	39	14
	Buckpasser	1970	1965–1967	31	25
	Busher	1964	1944–1947	21	15
	Bushranger (steeplechaser)	1967	1932–1936	21	11
	Cafe Prince (steeplechaser)	1985	1972–1980	52	18
	California Chrome	2023	2013–2017	27	16
	Carry Back	1975	1960–1963	61	21
	Cavalcade	1993	1933–1936	22	8
	Challedon	1977	1938–1942	44	20
	Chris Evert	1988	1973–1975	15	10
	Cicada	1967	1961–1964	42	23
	Cigar	2002	1993–1996	33	19
	Citation	1959	1947–1951	45	32
	Clifford	2014	1892–1897	62	42
	Coaltown	1983	1948–1951	39	23
	Colin	1956	1907–1908	15	15
	Commando	1956	1900–1901	9	7
	Cougar II	2006	1968–1973	50	20
	Count Fleet	1961	1942–1943	21	16
	Crusader	1995	1925–1928	42	18
	Curlin	2014	2007–2008	16	11
	Dahlia	1981	1972–1976	48	15
	Damascus	1974	1966–1968	32	21
	Dance Smartly	2003	1990–1992	17	12
	Dark Mirage	1974	1967–1969	27	12
	Davona Dale	1985	1978–1980	18	11
	Decathlon	2025	1955-1957	42	25
	Desert Vixen	1979	1972–1975	28	13
	Devil Diver	1980	1941–1945	47	22
	Discovery	1969	1933–1936	63	27
	Domino	1955	1893–1895	25	19
	Dr. Fager	1971	1966–1968	22	18
	Duke of Magenta	2011	1877–1878	19	15
	Easy Goer	1997	1988–1990	20	14
	Eight Thirty	1994	1938–1941	27	16
	Elkridge (steeplechaser)	1966	1941–1951	123	31
	Emperor of Norfolk	1988	1887–1888	29	21
	Equipoise	1957	1930–1935	51	29
	Exceller	1999	1975–1979	33	15
	Exterminator	1957	1917–1924	100	50
	Fair Play	1956	1907–1909	32	10
	Fairmount (steeplechaser)	1985	1923–1931	22	12
	Fashion	1980	1840–1848	36	32
	Firenze	1981	1886–1891	82	47
	Flatterer (steeplechaser)	1994	1982–1987	51	24
	Flawlessly	2004	1990–1994	28	16
	Foolish Pleasure	1995	1974–1976	26	16
	Forego	1979	1973–1978	57	34
	Fort Marcy	1998	1966–1971	75	21
	Gallant Bloom	1977	1968–1970	22	16
	Gallant Fox	1957	1929–1930	17	11
	Gallant Man	1987	1956–1958	26	14
	Gallorette	1962	1944–1948	72	21
	Gamely	1980	1967–1969	41	16
	Genuine Risk	1986	1979–1981	15	10
	Ghostzapper	2012	2002–2005	11	9
	Go For Wand	1996	1989–1990	13	10
	Goldikova	2017	2007–2011	27	17
	Good and Plenty (steeplechaser)	1956	1904–1907	21	14
	Good Night Shirt (steeplechaser)	2017	2004–2009	33	14
	Granville	1997	1935–1936	18	8
	Grey Lag	1957	1920-3, 1927-8, 1931	47	25
	Gun Bow	1999	1963–1965	42	17
	Gulch	2026	1986-1988	32	13
	Gun Runner	2024	2015–17	19	12
	Hamburg	1986	1897–1898	21	16
	Hanover	1955	1886–1889	50	32
	Harry Bassett	2010	1870–1874	36	23
	Heavenly Prize	2018	1993–1996	18	9
	Henry of Navarre	1985	1893–1896	42	29
	Hermis	2025	1901-1905	55	28
	Hill Prince	1991	1949–1952	30	17
	Hillsdale	2022	1957–1959	41	23
	Hindoo	1955	1880–1882	35	30
	Holy Bull	2001	1993–1995	16	13
	Housebuster	2013	1989–1991	22	15
	Imp	1965	1896–1901	171	62
	Inside Information	2008	1993–1995	17	14
	Invasor	2013	2005–2007	12	11
	Jay Trump (steeplechaser)	1971	1959–1966	26	12
	John Henry	1990	1977–1984	83	39
	Johnstown	1992	1938–1939	21	14
	Jolly Roger (steeplechaser)	1965	1924–1930	49	18
	Justify	2024	2018	6	5
	Kelso	1967	1959–1966	63	39
	Kentucky	1983	1863–1866	23	21
	Kingston	1955	1886–1894	138	89
	Kona Gold	2026	1998-2003	30	14
	L'Escargot (steeplechaser)	1977	1968–1975	53	12
	La Prevoyante	1995	1972–1974	39	25
	Lady's Secret	1992	1984–1987	45	25
	Lava Man	2015	2003–2009	47	17
	Lecomte	2024	1852–1856	17	11
	Lexington	1955	1853–1854	7	6
	Lonesome Glory (steeplechaser)	2005	1991–1999	42	23
	Longfellow	1971	1870–1872	16	13
	Luke Blackburn	1956	1879–1881	39	25
	Lure	2013	1991–1994	25	14
	Majestic Prince	1988	1968–1969	10	9
	Man o' War	1957	1919–1920	21	20
	Manila	2008	1985–1987	18	12
	Maskette	2001	1908–1910	17	12
	McDynamo (steeplechaser)	2013	2000–2007	34	17
	Miesque	1999	1986–1988	16	12
	Miss Woodford	1967	1882–1886	48	37
	Mom's Command	2007	1984–1985	16	11
	Mongo	2026	1961-1964	46	22
	My Juliet	2019	1974–1977	36	24
	Myrtlewood	1979	1934–1936	22	15
	Nashua	1965	1954–1956	30	22
	Native Dancer	1963	1952–1954	22	21
	Native Diver	1978	1961–1967	81	37
	Needles	2000	1955–1957	21	11
	Neji (steeplechaser)	1966	1953–1960	49	17
	Noor	2002	1947–1950	31	12
	Northern Dancer	1976	1963–1964	18	14
	Oedipus (steeplechaser)	1978	1948–1952	58	14
	Old Rosebud	1968	1913-4, 1917, 1919–22	80	40
	Omaha	1965	1934–1936	22	9
	Open Mind	2011	1988–1990	19	12
	Pan Zareta	1972	1912–1917	151	76
	Parole	1984	1875–1885	138	59
	Paseana	2001	1990–1985	36	19
	Personal Ensign	1993	1986–1988	13	13
	Peter Pan	1956	1906–1907	17	10
	Planet	2012	1858–1860	31	27
	Point Given	2010	2000–2001	13	9
	Preakness	2018	1870–1876	39	18
	Precisionist	2003	1983–1988	46	20
	Princess Doreen	1982	1923–1927	94	34
	Princess Rooney	1991	1982–1984	21	17
	Rachel Alexandra	2016	2008–2010	19	13
	Real Delight	1987	1952–1953	15	12
	Regret	1957	1914–1917	11	9
	Reigh Count	1978	1927–1929	27	12
	Riva Ridge	1998	1971–1973	30	17
	Roamer	1981	1913–1919	98	39
	Roseben	1956	1903–1909	111	52
	Royal Delta	2019	2010–2013	22	12
	Royal Heroine	2022	1982–1984	21	10
	Round Table	1972	1956–1959	66	43
	Ruffian	1976	1974–1975	11	10
	Ruthless	1975	1866–1867	11	7
	Safely Kept	2011	1988–1991	31	24
	Salvator	1955	1888–1890	19	16
	Sarazen	1957	1923–1928	55	27
	Seabiscuit	1958	1935–1940	89	33
	Searching	1978	1954–1958	89	25
	Seattle Slew	1981	1976–1978	17	14
	Secretariat	1974	1972–1973	21	16
	Serena's Song	2002	1994–1996	38	18
	Shuvee	1975	1968–1971	44	16
	Silver Charm	2007	1996–1999	24	12
	Silver Spoon	1978	1958–1960	27	13
	Silverbulletday	2009	1998–2000	23	15
	Sir Archy	1955	1808–1809	7	4
	Sir Barton	1957	1918–1920	31	13
	Skip Away	2004	1995–1998	38	18
	Sky Beauty	2011	1992–1995	21	15
	Slew o' Gold	1992	1982–1984	20	12
	Smarty Jones	2025	2003-2004	9	8
	Songbird	2023	2015–2017	15	13
	Spectacular Bid	1982	1978–1980	30	26
	Stymie	1975	1943–1949	131	35
	Sun Beau	1996	1927–1931	74	33
	Sunday Silence	1996	1988–1990	14	9
	Susan's Girl	1976	1971–1975	63	29
	Swaps	1966	1954–1956	25	19
	Swoon's Son	2007	1955–1958	51	30
	Sword Dancer	1977	1958–1960	39	15
	Sysonby	1956	1904–1905	15	14
	Ta Wee	1994	1968–1970	21	15
	Ten Broeck	1982	1874–1878	30	23
	Tepin	2022	2013–2016	23	13
	Tim Tam	1985	1957–1958	14	10
	Tiznow	2009	2000–2001	15	8
	Tom Fool	1960	1951–1953	30	21
	Tom Ochiltree	2016	1875–1877	33	21
	Tom Bowling	2020	1872–1874	17	14
	Top Flight	1966	1931–1932	16	12
	Tosmah	1984	1963–1966	39	23
	Tuscalee (steeplechaser)	2013	1963–1972	89	39
	Twenty Grand	1957	1930–1935	25	14
	Twilight Tear	1963	1943–1945	24	18
	Two Lea	1982	1948–1952	26	15
	War Admiral	1958	1936–1939	26	21
	Waya	2019	1977–1979	29	14
	Whirlaway	1959	1940–1943	60	32
	Whisk Broom II	1979	1909–1913	26	10
	Wise Dan	2020	2010–2014	31	23
	Winning Colors	2000	1987–1989	19	8
	Xtra Heat	2015	2000–2003	35	26
	Zaccio (steeplechaser)	1990	1979–1984	42	22
	Zenyatta	2016	2007–2010	20	19
	Zev	1983	1922–1924	43	23

Source: National Museum of Racing and Hall

== Jockeys in the Hall of Fame ==
Contemporary jockeys become eligible for the Hall of Fame after they have been licensed for at least 20 years, and remain eligible until 25 years after retirement. A five-year waiting period is required for jockeys whose body of work would be eligible for the Hall of Fame, but was not licensed for 15 years. A jockey who was licensed from 16 to 19 years before retirement will be eligible once 20 years from the first year of license or the five year retirement is waived by vote.

Name	Inducted	Career years	Wins	Significant horses
John H. Adams	1965	1935–1958	3,270	Kayak II, Hasty Road
Frank "Dooley" Adams	1970	1944–1956	337	Steeplechasers Neji, Elkridge
Joe Aitcheson Jr.	1978	1957–1987	478	Steeplechasers Bon Nouvel, Tuscalee
Chris Antley	2015	1983–2000	3,480	Charismatic, Strike the Gold
Eddie Arcaro	1958	1932–1962	4,779	Citation, Whirlaway, Bold Ruler, Native Dancer, Kelso
Ted Atkinson	1957	1938–1959	3,795	Tom Fool, Gallorette, Devil Diver
Braulio Baeza	1976	1960–1976	3,140**	Buckpasser, Dr. Fager, Chateaugay
Jerry D. Bailey	1995	1974–2006	5,894	Cigar, Black Tie Affair, Hansel, Sea Hero
George Barbee	1996	1872–1885	136**	Survivor, Tom Ochiltree
Shelby "Pike" Barnes	2011	1888-c.1900	not recorded	Burlington
Caroll K. Bassett	1972	1929-c.1939	>100	Steeplechasers Battleship, Peacock
Russell Baze	1999	1974–2016	12,842	Lost in the Fog, Shared Belief
Walter Blum	1987	1953–1975	4,382	Affectionately, Gun Bow, Pass Catcher
William Boland	2006	1949–1969	2,049	Beau Purple, Middleground, Amberoid
Calvin Borel	2013	1983-*	5,218+	Rachel Alexandra, Mine That Bird, Street Sense, Super Saver
George Bostwick	1968	1927–1949	87	Steeplechasers Chenango, Escapade
Sam Boulmetis Sr.	1973	1948–1966	2,783	Tosmah, Dedicate
Steve Brooks	1963	1938–1975	4,451	Citation, Coaltown, Two Lea
Don Brumfield	1996	1954–1989	4,573	Kauai King, Our Mims
Thomas H. Burns	1983	1895–1913	1,333	Broomstick, Imp
James H. Butwell	1984	1907–1928	1,402	Maskette, Roamer, Sweep
J. Dallett Byers	1967	1916–1931	149	Steeplechasers Jolly Roger, Fairmount
Javier Castellano	2017	1997-*	5,500+	Ghostzapper, Bernardini, Cloud Computing
Steve Cauthen	1994	1976–1992	2,794	Affirmed, Old Vic, Oh So Sharp, Reference Point
Frank Coltiletti	1970	1919–1934	667	Crusader, Mars, Sun Beau
Ángel Cordero Jr.	1988	1960–1992	7,057	Bold Forbes, Cannonade, Seattle Slew, Slew o' Gold, Spend A Buck
Robert H. Crawford	1973	1916–1928	139	Steeplechasers The Brook, Jolly Roger
Pat Day	1991	1973–2005	8,803	Easy Goer, Dance Smartly, Lady's Secret, Summer Squall, Unbridled
Eddie Delahoussaye	1993	1967–2002	6,384	A.P. Indy, Risen Star, Princess Rooney, Prized
Kent Desormeaux	2004	1986-*	6,116+	Real Quiet, Fusaichi Pegasus, Big Brown, Best Pal
Ramon Domínguez	2016	1996–2013	4,985	Havre de Grace, Gio Ponti, Better Talk Now
Lavelle Ensor	1962	1918–1945	1,948	Exterminator, Grey Lag, Hannibal
Victor Espinoza	2017	1993-*	3,358+	American Pharoah, California Chrome, War Emblem
Laverne Fator	1955	1918–1933	1,075	Grey Lag, Black Maria, Pompey, Scapa Flow
Earlie Fires	2001	1964–2008	6,470	In Reality, War Censor
Jerry Fishback	1992	1964–1987	301	Steeplechasers Cafe Prince, Flatterer
Mack Garner	1969	1914–1936	1,346	Blue Larkspur, Cavalcade
Edward H. Garrison	1955	late 1800s	>700	Firenze, Tammany
Avelino Gomez	1982	1944–1981	4,081	Affectionately, Ridan, Victoria Park
Garrett K. Gomez	2017	1988–2013	3,769	Blame, Rags to Riches, Midnight Lute
Henry Griffin	1956	late 1800s	569	Hastings, Henry of Navarre, The Butterflies
Eric Guerin	1972	1941–1975	2,712	Native Dancer, Jet Pilot
Anthony Hamilton	2012	1881–1904	not recorded	Firenze, Salvator
Bill Hartack	1959	1953–1974	4,272	Northern Dancer, Majestic Prince, Iron Liege, Decidedly
Sandy Hawley	1992	1968–1988	6,450	L'Enjoleur, Kennedy Road, Fanfreluche, Dahlia
Abe Hawkins	2024	1851–1866	not recorded	Lecomte, Arrow, Merrill, Minnehaha
Lloyd Hughes	2014	1872–1883	not recorded	Tom Ochiltree, Duke of Magenta
Albert Johnson	1971	1917–1929	503	American Flag, Crusader, Exterminator
William J. Knapp	1969	1901–1919	649	Exterminator, Upset
Julie Krone	2000	1981–2004	3,704	Colonial Affair, Halfbridled
Clarence Kummer	1972	1916–1928	434	Man O' War, Sir Barton
Charles Kurtsinger	1967	1924–1939	721	War Admiral, Twenty Grand
Johnny Loftus	1959	1909–1919	580	Man O' War, Sir Barton, George Smith
Johnny Longden	1958	1927–1966	6,032	Count Fleet, Swaps, Busher, Whirlaway
Daniel A. Maher	1955	turn of 20th century	1,771**	Ethelbert, Banaster, Lothario
Eddie Maple	2009	1966–1991	4,398	Conquistador Cielo, Alydar, Creme Fraiche
Linus McAtee	1956	1920s & 1930s	930	Exterminator, Twenty Grand
Chris McCarron	1989	1974–2002	7,141	Alysheba, Lady's Secret, Sunday Silence, Tiznow, Touch Gold
Conn McCreary	1975	1939–1960	1,263	Armed, Count Turf, Devil Diver, Stymie, Twilight Tear
Darrel G. McHargue	2020	1972–1988	2,553	General Assembly, Honest Pleasure, John Henry
Rigan McKinney	1968	1929–1939	352	Steeplechasers Green Cheese, Annibal
Jim McLaughlin	1955	late 1800s	not recorded	Luke Blackburn, Hindoo, Firenze, Tremont
Walter Miller	1955	early 1900s	1,094	Colin, Ballot, Peter Pan
Isaac Murphy	1955	c.1879–1896	530	Emperor of Norfolk, Kingston, Firenze, Salvator
Corey Nakatani	2023	1988–2018	3,909	Lava Man, Serena's Song
Ralph Neves	1960	c.1930–1963	3,772	Round Table, Native Diver
Joe Notter	1963	1904–1918	not recorded	Regret, Whisk Broom II, Colin
George Odom	1955	turn of 20th century	527	Broomstick, Delhi
Frank O'Neill	1956	1903-c.1920	not recorded	Beldame, Roseben
Ivan H. Parke	1978	1923–1925	419	Backbone
Gilbert W. Patrick	1970	1836–1879	not recorded	Boston, Lexington
Craig Perret	2019	1967–2005	4,415	Bet Twice, Unbridled, Strike the Gold, Alydeed, Pine Bluff
Donald Pierce	2010	1954–1984	3,546	Flying Paster, Quack, Triple Bend
Laffit Pincay Jr.	1975	1966–2003	9,530	Affirmed, John Henry, Genuine Risk, Bayakoa
Vincent Powers	2015	1907–1923	654**	Wintergreen, Fitz Herbert
Edgar Prado	2008	1986-2023	7,119	Barbaro, Birdstone, Sarava
Samuel Purdy	1970	early 1800s	not recorded	American Eclipse
John Reiff	1956	turn of 20th century	1,016 in Europe	Orby, Tagalie
Alfred Robertson	1971	1927–1943	1,856	Top Flight, Whirlaway
John L. Rotz	1983	1958–1973	2,907	Gallant Bloom, Ta Wee, Carry Back, Dr. Fager, High Echelon
Randy Romero	2010	1973–1999	4,294	Personal Ensign, Go For Wand
Joel Rosario	2024	2003–	3,604+	Accelerate Knicks Go, Animal Kingdom, Jackie's Warrior
Earl Sande	1955	1917–1932	968	Gallant Fox, Zev, Crusader, Billy Kelly
José A. Santos	2007	1984–2007	4,083	Funny Cide, Lemon Drop Kid, Volponi
Johnny Sellers	2007	1955–1977	2,797	Carry Back, Hail To All, Pia Star
Carroll H. Shilling	1970	1904–1912	969	Worth
Willie Shoemaker	1958	1949–1990	8,883	Swaps, John Henry, Spectacular Bid, Ack Ack, Gallant Man, Forego
Willie Simms	1977	1887–1901	1,125	Ben Brush, Plaudit, Henry of Navarre
Tod Sloan	1955	turn of 20th century	not recorded	Hamburg, Clifford
Mike E. Smith	2003	1982-*	5,480+	Zenyatta, Holy Bull, Justify, Skip Away, Songbird
Alfred P. Smithwick	1973	1947–1966	398	Steeplechasers Neji, Bon Nouvel, Elkridge
Alex Solis	2014	1982–2017	5,035	Snow Chief, Kona Gold, Pleasantly Perfect
Gary Stevens	1997	1979–2005; 2013–2018	5,177+	Beholder, Serena's Song, Silver Charm, Point Given, Winning Colors, Thunder Gulch
James Stout	1968	1930–1954	2,056	Granville, Johnstown, Assault, Omaha, Stymie
Fred Taral	1955	late 1800s	1,437	Domino
Fernando Toro	2023	1956-1990	3,555**	Cougar II, Royal Heroine, Manila
Bayard Tuckerman Jr.	1973	1910–1954	not recorded	Steeplechaser Homestead
Ron Turcotte	1979	1961–1978	3,082	Secretariat, Riva Ridge, Northern Dancer, Tom Rolfe
Nash Turner	1955	turn of 20th century	not recorded	Imp
Bobby Ussery	1980	1951–1974	3,611	Proud Clarion, Bally Ache
Ismael Valenzuela	2008	1951–1980	2,545	Kelso, Tim Tam, Forward Pass
Jacinto Vásquez	1998	1959–1996	5,231	Ruffian, Genuine Risk, Foolish Pleasure, Forego, Princess Rooney
Jorge Velásquez	1990	1963–1997	6,795	Alydar, Chris Evert, Davona Dale, Pleasant Colony
John Velazquez	2012	1990-*	6,594+	Animal Kingdom, Always Dreaming, Ashado, Authentic, Rags to Riches, Wise Dan
Thomas M. Walsh	2005	1956–1967	1,475	Steeplechasers Bon Nouvel, Bluff, Mako
Jack Westrope	2002	1933–1958	2,467	Stagehand, Parlo
Jimmy Winkfield	2004	1898–1930	2,500	His Eminence, Alan-a-Dale
George Woolf	1955	1928–1946	721	Seabiscuit, Alsab, Bold Venture
Raymond Workman	1956	1926–1940	1,169	Equipoise
Wayne D. Wright	2016	1931–1949	1,492	Peace Chance, Polynesian, Shut Out
Manuel Ycaza	1977	1956–1971	2,367	Dark Mirage, Quadrangle, Bald Eagle

Source: National Museum of Racing and Hall of Fame

Legend:
* Still active (+ Win totals from Equibase.com as of 30 September 2018)
** Wins in North America only

== Trainers in the Hall of Fame ==
Contemporary trainers become eligible for the Hall of Fame after they have been licensed for at least 25 years, and remain eligible until 25 years after retirement. In special circumstances such as fragile health, the 25 year requirement may be waived though there is usually a five-year waiting period after retirement in such cases.

Name	Year awarded
Steve Asmussen	2016
Roger L. Attfield	2012
Bob Baffert	2009
Laz Barrera	1979
H. Guy Bedwell	1971
Edward D. Brown	1984
J. Elliott Burch	1980
Preston M. Burch	1963
William P. Burch	1955
Fred Burlew	1973
Matthew Byrnes	2011
Mark E. Casse	2020
Frank E. Childs	1968
Henry S. Clark	1982
Christophe Clement	2026
W. Burling Cocks	1985
George H. Conway	2025
James P. Conway	1996
Warren A. Croll Jr.	1994
Bud Delp	2002
Neil Drysdale	2000
William B. Duke	1956
Janet Elliot	2009
Louis Feustel	1964
Jack Fisher	2021
James Fitzsimmons	1958
Henry Forrest	2007
Robert J. Frankel	1995
John M. Gaver Sr.	1966
Carl Hanford	2006
Thomas J. Healey	1955
Samuel C. Hildreth	1955
Sonny Hine	2003
Maximilian Hirsch	1959
William J. Hirsch	1982
Thomas Hitchcock	1973
Jerry Hollendorfer	2011
Hollie Hughes	1973
John J. Hyland	1956
Hirsch Jacobs	1958
H. Allen Jerkens	1975
Philip G. Johnson	1997
William R. Johnson	1986
LeRoy Jolley	1987
Benjamin A. Jones	1958
Gary F. Jones	2014
Horace A. Jones	1959
A. Jack Joyner	1955
Thomas J. Kelly	1993
Lucien Laurin	1977
William Lakeland	2018
King T. Leatherbury	2015
J. Howard Lewis	1969
D. Wayne Lukas	1999
Horatio Luro	1980
John E. Madden	1983
James W. Maloney	1989
Richard E. Mandella	2001
Pancho Martin	1981
Frank McCabe	2007
Ron McAnally	1990
Henry E. McDaniel	1956
Claude R. McGaughey III	2004
MacKenzie Miller	1987
Michael "Buster" Millerick	2010
William Molter	1960
William I. Mott	1998
Winbert F. Mulholland	1967
Carl Nafzger	2008
Edward A. Neloy	1983
John A. Nerud	1972
Burley Parke	1986
Angel Penna Sr.	1988
Jacob Pincus	1988
Todd Pletcher	2021
John W. Rogers	1955
James G. Rowe Sr.	1955
Flint S. Schulhofer	1992
Jonathan E. Sheppard	1990
John Shirreffs	2026
Robert A. Smith	1976
Tom Smith	2001
Daniel Michael Smithwick	1971
Woody Stephens	1976
Mesh Tenney	1991
Herbert J. Thompson	1969
Harry Trotsek	1984
Jack Van Berg	1985
Marion Van Berg	1970
John M. Veitch	2007
Sylvester Veitch	1977
Thomas H. Voss	2017
R. Wyndham Walden	1970
Michael G. Walsh	1997
Sherrill W. Ward	1978
Sidney J. Watters Jr.	2005
Robert L. Wheeler	2012
Oscar White	2022
David A. Whiteley	2026
Frank Y. Whiteley Jr.	1978
Charles E. Whittingham	1974
Ansel Williamson	1998
William C. Winfrey	1971
G. Carey Winfrey	1975
Nick Zito	2005

== Presidents ==
Name	Term
Cornelius Vanderbilt Whitney	1950–1953
Walter M. Jeffords Sr.	1953–1960
George D. Widener Jr.	1960–1968
John W. Hanes	1968–1970
Gerard S. Smith	1970–1974
Charles E. Mather II	1974–1982
Whitney Tower	1982–1989
John T. von Stade	1989–2005
Stella F. Thayer	2005–2014
Gretchen Jackson	2014–2017
John Hendrickson	2017–2024
Charlotte C. Weber	2024–present

== Exemplars of Racing ==
Name	Year awarded
George D. Widener Jr.	1971
Walter M. Jeffords Sr.	1973
John W. Hanes	1982
Paul Mellon	1989
Martha F. Gerry	2007

== Pillars of the Turf ==
Established in 2013, the Hall of Fame states that the Pillars of the Turf category honors those "who have made extraordinary contributions to Thoroughbred racing in a leadership or pioneering capacity at the highest national level."

Name	Year Awarded
Prince Khalid bin Abdullah Al Saud	2026
Robert Copelan	2026
Seth W. Hancock	2026
G. Watts Humphrey Jr.	2026
Joseph E. Widener	2026
Richard Ten Broeck	2025
Edward L. Bowen	2025
Arthur B. Hancock III	2025
Harry F. Guggenheim	2024
Clement L. Hirsch	2024
Joe Hirsch	2024
John W. Hanes II	2023
Leonard W. Jerome	2023
Stella F. Thayer	2023
James Cox Brady	2022
Marshall W. Cassidy	2022
James Ben Ali Haggin	2022
Alice Headley Chandler	2020
George D. Widener Jr.	2020
J. Keene Daingerfield Jr.	2020
Christopher T. Chenery	2019
Frank E. Kilroe	2019
Gladys Mills Phipps	2019
Helen Hay Whitney	2019
James E. Bassett III	2019
James R. Keene	2019
John Hettinger	2019
Marylou Whitney	2019
Ogden Phipps	2019
Richard L. Duchossois	2019
Warren Wright Sr.	2019
William S. Farish	2019
Elias J. "Lucky" Baldwin	2018
August Belmont	2018
W. Cothran "Cot" Campbell	2018
Penny Chenery	2018
John W. Galbreath	2018
Arthur B. Hancock	2018
Hal Price Headley	2018
John Morrissey	2018
Dr. Charles H. Strub	2018
William Collins Whitney	2018
Harry Payne Whitney	2018
Cornelius Vanderbilt Whitney	2018
John R. Gaines	2017
Ogden Mills "Dinny" Phipps	2017
Matt Winn	2017
Arthur B. Hancock Jr.	2016
William Woodward Sr.	2016
John Hay Whitney	2015
Alfred G. Vanderbilt Jr.	2015
E. P. Taylor	2014
Edward R. Bradley	2014
August Belmont Jr.	2013
Paul Mellon	2013

== Museum exhibits ==
In addition to the Hall of Fame, the museum houses numerous exhibits. These include:

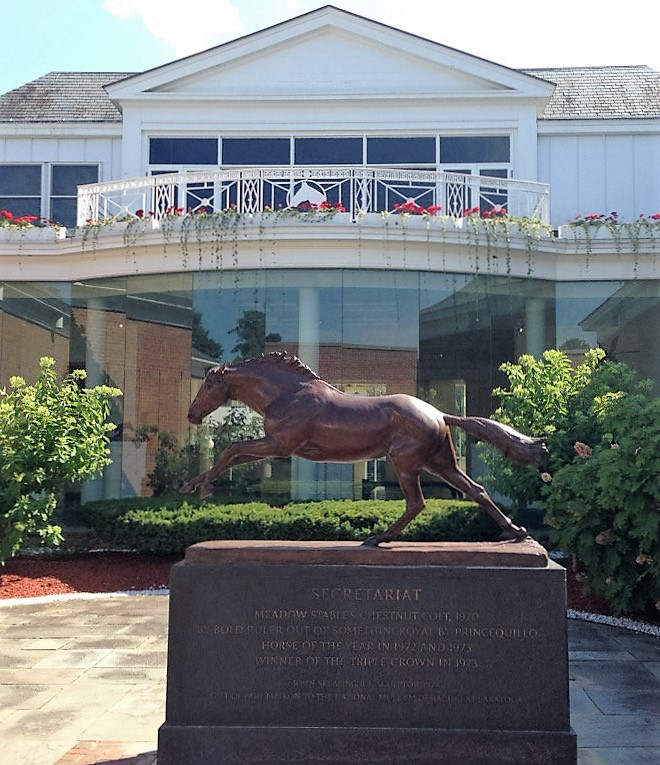
Secretariat statue by John Skeaping

- The Link Gallery, which features a bronze statue, Seasick, and a rotating selection of paintings
- The Sculpture Gallery, which features work by June Harrah, Herbert Haseltine, Marilyn Newmark, Jim Reno, John Skeaping and Eleanor Iselin Wade, among others. The gallery looks out onto the inner courtyard, which features a bronze statue of Secretariat by Skeaping
- The Colonial Gallery, which covers the ocean transportation of horses and the foundations of American racing
- The Pre-Civil War Gallery, covering the expansion of racing during the early 19th century
- The Post-Civil War Gallery, covering the continued expansion of racing after the Civil War until a backlash to gambling in the early 20th century led to the closure of many tracks
- The 20th Century Gallery, which covers more recent topics
- The Eclipse Gallery, featuring award-winning entries from the Eclipse Award photography competition
- The Racing Day Gallery, which features displays about jockeys, odds and the Breeders' Cup
- The Anatomy Room, covering the breeding and biology of the Thoroughbred
- The Triple Crown Gallery, including information and artifacts related to Triple Crown history
- The Steeplechase Gallery, covering the history of steeplechase racing in America
- The von Stade Gallery, which displays a selection of paintings, works on paper, or photographic prints from the Museum Collection
- The Peter McBean Gallery, which houses temporary exhibitions, a semi-permanent Hall of Fame Heroes exhibition and seasonal exhibitions. It also houses a collection bequeathed by John Nerud, including trophies and paintings of the Hall of Fame horses he trained, Gallant Man and Dr. Fager

The Museum Collection includes just over 300 paintings. These range from paintings of the early days of racing in England by John E. Ferneley Sr. to more contemporary champions by Richard Stone Reeves. Featured artists include: William Smithson Broadhead, Vaughn Flannery, Sir Alfred J. Munnings, Frederic Remington, Martin Stainforth, George Stubbs, Henry Stull, Edward Troye and Franklin Brooke Voss. Also on display are Kelso's five Jockey Club Gold Cup trophies and the Triple Crown trophies of Count Fleet.

== See also ==
- Australian Racing Hall of Fame
- British Steeplechasing Hall of Fame
- British National Horseracing Museum
- Canadian Horse Racing Hall of Fame
- Japan Racing Association Hall of Fame
- Harness Racing Museum & Hall of Fame
- New Zealand Racing Hall of Fame
- Aiken Thoroughbred Racing Hall of Fame and Museum
