= Richard Ten Broeck =

American racehorse owner (1812–1892)

- 1864 portrait
- Born: 1810s Albany, New York, U.S.
- Died: August 1, 1892 (age 80-82); San Mateo, California, U.S.
- Burial place: Cave Hill Cemetery, Louisville, Kentucky, U.S.
- Education: United States Military Academy (dropped out)
- Occupations: Racehorse owner; race track manager
- Spouse: Patty D. Anderson (m. 1857; died 1873) Mary Cornelia Smith (m. 1877)
- Children: 2
- Awards: National Museum of Racing and Hall of Fame (2025)

Richard Ten Broeck (1810s – August 1, 1892) was an American owner of Thoroughbred race horses. He operated several race courses, including the Metairie Race Course, and later bought winning racehorse Lexington from Elisha Warfield. In a trend nicknamed as an "American invasion", he entered many of his horses in competitions in England starting in 1856, amassing several wins such as the 1861 Goodwood Cup and earning $200,000 ($5.47 million in 2024); this also inspired a rise in American-owned competitors in English horse races.

== Biography ==
=== Early life and career ===
Ten Broeck was born in Albany, New York, in the 1810s. (Note: Sources vary on the birth date: 1810, 1811, c.1811 or May 1812.) The son of Richard Ten Broeck, he was part of a Dutch family. After graduating from the Albany Academy, he was accepted to the United States Military Academy in 1829, remaining there until resigning in February 1830. He had reportedly challenged one of his instructors to a duel over an insult, and he was estranged from the family due to his behavior at West Point; according to the National Museum of Racing and Hall of Fame, he may have been spared expulsion due to his family background.

In the 1830s, Ten Broeck joined the racehorse industry, gaining experience throughout the United States. He later competed in horse-racing, wearing his own orange and black sash colors. He also partnered with another equestrian, William Ransom Johnson. In 1847 or 1848, he became manager for the Bascombe Race Course in Mobile, Alabama, and the Bingaman Race Track in New Orleans. In 1851, he bought out the Metairie Race Course in New Orleans for $27,000, turning it into the country's greatest racecourses during the pre-Civil War era.

One of Ten Broeck's first feats in racing was at the 1853 Citizens' Stakes, where he bought a colt from Elisha Warfield named Darley and renamed him Lexington, and became his trainer. He also organized three Lexington races against rival Thomas Jefferson Wells' horse Lecomte, winning the first and last. Lexington went on to sire sixteen horses. In 1856, he sold off his ownership share in the Metairie Race Course.

=== "American invasion" ===
In July 1856, in a move widely known in media as an "American invasion", Ten Broeck headed to the United Kingdom to challenge Lecomte, Pryor, and Prioress - which he previously bought - to a race with British horses. Despite Ten Broeck's initial struggles amidst conditions unique to the United Kingdom, he managed widespread success throughout England for more than two decades.

Prioress won the 1857 Cesarewitch Handicap after a triple dead heat and a runoff despite odds at 100-1, as well as the Great Yorkshire and the Queen's Plate. Two horses Ten Broeck owned, Optimist and Starke, won more than half-a-dozen races altogether, with the latter winning the 1861 Goodwood Cup. He was also a runner-up at the 1860 Epsom Derby for Umpire, another horse he owned.

Ten Broeck's successes conferred a degree of transatlantic respect, and according to John Dizikes, marked a "long period of transatlantic rivalry between the two countries". John L. Hervey called him the "uncrowned king of the American sporting world". He became the first American to join the Jockey Club, and his actions inspired other Americans to enter race horses in England-based competitions. Despite his success, his stable itself struggled to survive, with some of them feeling unaccustomed to the speed-centric English racing climate or even dying. He returned to the United States after the 1867 racing season ended; despite the relative lack of success with the "American invasion", he amassed $200,000 in earnings alone.

In 1878, Ten Broeck returned to the United Kingdom to witness the English racehorse scene's second "American invasion"; Gary A. O'Dell said that this may have been because Milton H. Sanford planned to ship some racehorses to England. He also served as counsel for other racehorse owners, including James R. Keene. His efforts as a racehorse owner in that era, however, did not match his previous success, with two horses he bought from William Douglas-Hamilton, 12th Duke of Hamilton, Jolly Sir John and Saratoga, failing to place at the Epsom Derby. He returned to the United States in 1887.

=== Personal life and death ===
Ten Broeck was twice married: to Patty D. Anderson from June 20, 1857, until her death on March 27, 1873; and from June 14, 1877, to Mary Cornelia Smith. He had two children from his second marriage, one of which died in infancy. He also owned a 525-acre (212 ha) estate named Hurstbourne, located near Louisville.

Ten Broeck's second marriage ended "in an atmosphere of considerable mutual recrimination", with Mary growing concerned about his eccentric behavior. In October 1888, she asked the Superior Court of California to declare him insane; she then alleged that Richard had falsely accused her of trying to kidnap or poison him. However, the San Francisco Lunacy Commission found that Ten Broeck's behavior did not warrant institutionalization, and the jury went in Richard's favor in December.

With Mary's petition to the Superior Court for divorce denied, the Ten Broeck couple split, with Richard moving to a new home in San Mateo, California, and Mary returning to Louisville. Hervey remarked that Ten Broeck remained "in self-chosen solitude and isolation from the world, [with] his only resources the few remaining souvenirs of a vanished past that from time to time he parted with for the means of subsistence". He died on August 1, 1892, in his San Mateo home. On August 9, he was buried at Cave Hill Cemetery alongside his first wife.

Ten Broeck was elected to the National Museum of Racing and Hall of Fame in 2025. At the time, Adam Shinder of the Times Union called him "an important figure in 19th century thoroughbred racing" and "America’s top racing promoter of his decade".
