= Wintergreen (horse) =

American-bred Thoroughbred racehorse

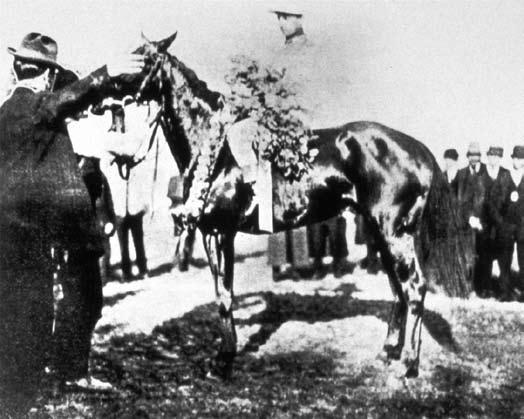
- 1909 Kentucky Derby winner Wintergreen
- Sire: Dick Welles
- Grandsire: King Eric
- Dam: Winter
- Damsire: Exile
- Sex: Stallion, eventually Gelding
- Foaled: 1906
- Country: United States
- Colour: Bay
- Breeder: Jerome Bristow Respess
- Owner: 1) Jerome B. Respess; 2) D. Fisk
- Trainer: Charles Mack
- Record: 61:16-14-8
- Earnings: $12,820

Major wins
- American Classics wins: Kentucky Derby (1909)

Wintergreen (1906–1914) was an American Thoroughbred racehorse that is best known for winning the 1909 Kentucky Derby and for being the first horse bred in Ohio to win the Derby. Wintergreen was bred and trained by Jerome "Rome" Respess at his Ohio stud farm. Respess was a multimillionaire owner of a brewing company and also owned Wintergreen's sire, Dick Welles — named after Richard H. Welles, later the father of Orson Welles.

Wintergreen raced from ages two to seven years old but did not win any stakes races before or after the Kentucky Derby but was a stakes performer for most of his career.

Wintergreen was killed April 10, 1914, in a fire that consumed barn #18 at the Latonia Race Track in Covington, Kentucky, just across the Ohio River from Cincinnati. He had been gelded some years previously and was racing for D. Fisk.

== Pedigree ==
Pedigree of Wintergreen
Sire Dick Welles 1900	King Eric 1887	King Ernest	King Tom*
Sire Dick Welles 1900	King Eric 1887	King Ernest	Ernestine
Sire Dick Welles 1900	King Eric 1887	Cyclone	Parmesan
Sire Dick Welles 1900	King Eric 1887	Cyclone	Typhoon
Sire Dick Welles 1900	Tea's Over 1893	Hanover	Hindoo
Sire Dick Welles 1900	Tea's Over 1893	Hanover	Bourbon Belle
Sire Dick Welles 1900	Tea's Over 1893	Tea Rose	King Alfonso*
Sire Dick Welles 1900	Tea's Over 1893	Tea Rose	Tuberose
Dam Winter 1896	Exile 1882	Mortemer	Compiegne
Dam Winter 1896	Exile 1882	Mortemer	Comtesse
Dam Winter 1896	Exile 1882	Second Hand	Stockwell
Dam Winter 1896	Exile 1882	Second Hand	Gaiety
Dam Winter 1896	Wildflower 1889	Mr Pickwick	Hermit
Dam Winter 1896	Wildflower 1889	Mr Pickwick	Tomato*
Dam Winter 1896	Wildflower 1889	Woodflower	The Ill-Used
Dam Winter 1896	Wildflower 1889	Woodflower	Woodbine

* Wintergreen is inbred 4S x 6S x 5D to the stallion King Tom, meaning that he appears fourth generation and sixth generation (via King Alfonso) on the sire side of his pedigree, and fifth generation (via Tomato) on the dam side of his pedigree.
