= Ladies Stakes =

- Class: Non-graded stakes
- Location: Aqueduct Racetrack; Queens, New York, United States
- Inaugurated: 1868
- Race type: Thoroughbred – Flat racing
- Website: NYRA

Race information
- Distance: 1-1/8 miles (9 furlongs)
- Surface: Dirt
- Track: left-handed
- Qualification: Fillies & Mares, age four & older
- Weight: Handicap
- Purse: $100,000

The Ladies Stakes is a historic American Thoroughbred horse race for Fillies and Mares four years of age and older held annually at Aqueduct Racetrack in Queens, New York. Inaugurated at the Jerome Park Racetrack in 1868, it is the oldest stakes race in the United States exclusively for fillies and mares. An unlisted stakes race, it is currently run on or about New Year's Day and offers a purse of $100,000.

From its beginnings in 1868 through 1912, the race was restricted to three-year-old fillies. Then from 1913 through 1938, it was made open to fillies of any age. Since 1939, it has been open to older fillies and mares. There was no race in 1895 and also none in 1911 and 1912, as a result of the New York State Legislature passage of the Hart–Agnew Law in 1908 which banned wagering and led to the shut down of all racing in the state. In 2006, the race was not run due to the shortage of entrants and as a result of NYRA financial reorganization, neither was it run in 2009.

The Ladies Handicap has been won by some notable females in American racing history including Hall of Fame inductees Firenze, Miss Woodford, Beldame, Maskette, Top Flight and Shuvee.

The Ladies Handicap has also been run at:

- Jerome Park Racetrack: 1868–1890
- Morris Park Racecourse: 1890–1904
- Belmont Park: 1905–1958, 1960

== Records ==
Speed record

- 1:49.78 @ 1-1/8 miles: Teen Pauline (2014)
- 1:36.40 @ 1 mile: Red Eye (1939)
- 2:01.40 @ 1-1/4 miles: Bastonera II (1976), Transient Trend (1995)
- 2:29.40 @ 1-1/2 miles: Goofed (1963)
- 2:58.25 @ 1-5/8 miles: Katie Pease 1873)

Most wins

- Black Maria (1926, 1927)
- Strolling Belle (1999, 2000)

Most wins by a jockey

- 6 – Ángel Cordero Jr. (1968, 1970, 1973, 1976, 1981, 1988)

Most wins by a trainer

- 4 – Jacob Pincus (1872, 1875, 1876, 1880)
- 4 – R. Wyndham Walden (1877, 1879, 1881, 1894)
- 4 – John C. Kimmel (1998, 1999, 2000, 2004)

Most wins by an owner

- 5 – August Belmont (1872, 1875, 1876, 1880, 1889)

== Winners ==
Year	Winner	Age	Jockey	Trainer	Owner	Dist. (Miles)	Time	Win $	Gr.
2025	Tizzy in the Sky	6	Kendrick Carmouche	Todd Pletcher	KimDon Racing LLC	1-1/8 m	1:52.56	$82,500	B/T
2024	Comparative	4	Manuel Franco	Brad H. Cox	Godolphin	1-1/8 m	1:55.83	$82,500	B/T
2023	Falconet	4	Jose Lezcano	Todd Pletcher	WinStar Farm & China Horse Club	1-1/8 m	1:52.15	$82,500	B/T
2022	Battle Bling	4	Trevor McCarthy	Rob Atras	Michael Dubb & Gandharvi Racing Stables	1-1/8 m	1:57.11	$55,000	B/T
2021	Thankful	4	Kendrick Carmouche	Todd Pletcher	Bass Stables LLC	1-1/8 m	1:53.51	$55,000	B/T
2020	Bellera	4	Jose Lezcano	Todd Pletcher	Mathis Stable LLC (Bill & Terry Mathis)	1-1/8 m	1:54.87	$55,000	B/T
2019	Forever Liesl	5	Eric Cancel	Michelle Nevin	Kallenberg Farms	1-1/8 m	1:54.12	$55,000	L/R
2018	Just Got Out	7	Manuel Franco	Linda Rice	Linda Rice & Sacandaga Stable	1-1/8 m	1:55.32	$60,000	L/R
2017	Wonder Gal	5	Kendrick Carmouche	Leah Gyarmati	Clearview Stable	1 m, 70 yds	1:42.45	$60,000	L/R
2016	Saythreehailmary's	5	Manuel Franco	John Morrison	Very Un Stable	1 m, 70 yds	1:44.91	$60,000	L/R
2015	Divided Attention	4	Dylan Davis	Kiaran McLaughlin	Godolphin	1-1/8 m	1:55.00	$60,000	L/R
2014	Teen Pauline	4	Irad Ortiz Jr.	Todd Pletcher	Stonestreet Stables	1-1/8 m	1:49.78	$60,000	L/R
2013	Arena Elvira	6	Junior Alvarado	William Mott	Carolyn Wilson	1-1/8 m	1:51.53	$45,000	L/R
2012	C C's Pal	5	Junior Alvarado	Richard E. Dutrow Jr.	Eric Fein	1-1/8 m	1:52.85	$45,000	L/R
2011	R Betty Graybull	5	Eddie Castro	Linda Ann White	Fantasy Lane Stable & Stronach Stables	1-1/8 m	1:50.56	$98,000	L/R
2010	Tidal Dance	5	Channing Hill	Michael Hushion	Marc C. Ferrell	1-1/8 m	1:53.59	$60,000	L/R
2009	Race not held								
2008	Borrowing Base	5	Javier Castellano	Patrick Quick	Daddie's Girl Stable, LLC	1-1/4 m	2:07.30	$49,260	L/R
2007	Wow Me Free	5	Alan Garcia	Kiaran McLaughlin	Edward A. Seltzer	1-1/4 m	2:04.63	$47,730	L/R
2006	Race not held								
2005	India Halo	5	Jose Espinoza	James Ferraro	Blue Sky Farm	1-1/4 m	2:05.20	$49,650	L/R
2004	Rare Gift	3	Richard Migliore	John C. Kimmel	George Bolton, David Dipietro, Roger Honour	1-1/4 m	2:05.40	$65,640	G3
2003	Savedbythelight	3	Richard Migliore	Richard Violette Jr.	Earle I. Mack	1-1/4 m	2:05.80	$67,260	G3
2002	Critical Eye	5	Mike Luzzi	Scott Schwartz	Herbert Schwartz	1-1/4 m	2:04.00	$64,440	G3
2001	Summer Colony	3	John Velazquez	Mark A. Hennig	Edward P. Evans	1-1/4 m	2:05.80	$66,660	G3
2000	Strolling Belle	4	Heberto Castillo Jr.	John C. Kimmel	Red Oak Stable (John Brunetti)	1-1/4 m	2:06.60	$66,000	G3
1999	Strolling Belle	3	Heberto Castillo Jr.	John C. Kimmel	Red Oak Stable (John Brunetti)	1-1/4 m	2:04.60	$65,640	G3
1998	Unbridled Hope	4	Richard Migliore	John C. Kimmel	Martin J. Wygod	1-1/4 m	2:03.40	$51,150	G3
1997	Prophet's Warning	4	Jorge Chavez	Joe Orseno	Jane Lyon	1-1/4 m	2:06.20	$60,000	G2
1996	Miss Slewpy	5	Larry Reynolds	Ronald Cartwright	Oliver C. Goldsmith	1-1/4 m	2:03.20	$66,660	G2
1995	Transient Trend	3	Jean-Luc Samyn	Patrick J. Kelly	Live Oak Racing (Charlotte Weber)	1-1/4 m	2:01.40	$67,800	G2
1994	Tara Roma	4	Frank Alvarado	C. R. McGaughey III	Emory A. Hamilton	1-1/4 m	2:06.60	$84,300	G2
1993	Groovy Feeling	4	Herb McCauley	Peter Ferriola	Robert P. Donaldson	1-1/4 m	2:05.80	$120,000	G2
1992	Brilliant Brass	5	Edgar Prado	Carlos A. Garcia	Elaine L. Bassford	1-1/4 m	2:03.40	$150,000	G2
1991	Wortheroatsingold	4	Eddie Maple	Patrick J. Kelly	Fox Ridge Farm (Peter G. Schiff)	1-1/4 m	2:02.40	$150,000	G2
1990	Colonial Waters	5	José Santos	LeRoy Jolley	Carl Icahn	1-1/4 m	2:05.80	$104,400	G2
1989	Dance Teacher	4	José Santos	Philip G. Johnson	Edward P. Evans	1-1/4 m	2:05.80	$141,120	G1
1988	Banker's Lady	3	Ángel Cordero Jr.	Philip Hauswald	Edward A. Cox Jr.	1-1/4 m	2:02.00	$138,960	G1
1987	Nastique	3	Robbie Davis	Stephen A. DiMauro	Bernard Chaus	1-1/4 m	2:04.40	$146,880	G1
1986	Life At The Top	3	Randy Romero	D. Wayne Lukas	Eugene V. Klein	1-1/4 m	2:03.80	$167,160	G1
1985	Videogenic	3	Robbie Davis	Gasper S. Moschera	Albert Davis	1-1/4 m	2:02.00	$67,800	G1
1984	Heatherten	5	Randy Romero	William I. Mott	John A. Franks	1-1/4 m	2:04.00	$71,400	G1
1983	Mademoiselle Forli	4	Gregg McCarron	Mitchell C. Preger	Leonard P. Sasso	1-1/4 m	2:03.40	$67,320	G1
1982	Tina Tina Too	4	Don MacBeth	Richard DeStasio	Albert Fried, Jr.	1-1/4 m	2:03.00	$65,520	G1
1981	Jameela	5	Ángel Cordero Jr.	Hyman M. Ravich	Peter M. Brant	1-1/4 m	2:01.80	$66,240	G1
1980	Plankton	4	Cash Asmussen	Howard M. Tesher	Frederick K. Tesher	1-1/4 m	2:03.00	$65,400	G1
1979	Spark Of Life	4	Jean Cruguet	MacKenzie Miller	Rokeby Stables	1-1/4 m	2:02.80	$64,740	G1
1978	Ida Delia	4	Angel Santiago	Laz Barrera	Aaron U. Jones	1-1/4 m	2:02.40	$65,820	G1
1977	Sensational	3	Michael Venezia	Woody Stephens	Mill House Stable	1-1/4 m	2:02.80	$65,820	G1
1976	Bastonera II	5	Ángel Cordero Jr.	Henry M. Moreno	Ann K. Elmore	1-1/4 m	2:01.40	$65,220	G1
1975	Tizna	6	Fernando Alvarez	Henry M. Moreno	Victor Zemborian	1-1/4 m	2:03.60	$51,390	G1
1974	Coraggioso	4	Eddie Maple	Anthony Basile	Bwamazon Farm (Millard Waldheim)	1-1/4 m	2:02.00	$33,300	G1
1973	Wakefield Miss	5	Ángel Cordero Jr.	H. Allen Jerkens	Hobeau Farm	1-1/4 m	2:03.80	$33,180	G1
1972	Grafitti	4	Michael Venezia	Horatio Luro	Louisa d'A Carpenter	1-1/4 m	2:04.80	$32,250	
1971	Sea Saga	3	Carlos H. Marquez Sr.	Herbert W. Jones	Buckland Farm	1-1/4 m	2:02.60	$34,680	
1970	Cathy Honey	3	Ángel Cordero Jr.	Evan S. Jackson	Frances M. Harcourt	1-1/4 m	2:02.20	$36,010	
1969	Shuvee	3	Jesse Davidson	Willard C. Freeman	Anne Minor Stone	1-1/4 m	2:03.00	$37,830	
1968	Politely	5	Ángel Cordero Jr.	George M. Baker	Bohemia Stable	1-1/4 m	2:02.60	$36,335	
1967	Sweet Folly	3	Heliodoro Gustines	John M. Gaver, Sr.	Greentree Stable	1-1/4 m	2:04.60	$38,090	
1966	Destro	3	Braulio Baeza	Edward A. Neloy	Ogden Phipps	1-1/4 m	2:02.40	$36,725	
1965	Straight Deal	3	Johnny Sellers	Hirsch Jacobs	Ethel D. Jacobs	1-1/4 m	2:03.60	$36,336	
1964	Steeple Jill	3	John Ruane	Bert Mulholland	George D. Widener Jr.	1-1/2 m	2:29.60	$38,415	
1963	Goofed	3	John L. Rotz	Oleg Dubassoff	John M. Schiff	1-1/2 m	2:29.40	$38,765	
1962	Royal Patrice	3	Howard Grant	Burley Parke	Harbor View Farm	1-5/16	2:10.60	$37,245	
1961	Mighty Fair	3	Paul J. Bailey	Edward A. Neloy	Andrew J. Crevolin	1-5/16	2:11.80	$37,050	
1960	Berlo	3	Eric Guerin	Richard E. Handlen	Foxcatcher Farm	1-1/2 m	2:30.60	$38,205	
1959	Tempted	4	Eldon Nelson	Henry S. Clark	Mooring Stable	1-1/4 m	2:09.00	$36,580	
1958	Endine	4	Eldon Nelson	Henry S. Clark	Christiana Stable	1-1/2 m	2:30.40	$37,165	
1957	Rare Treat	5	Paul J. Bailey	Bert Mulholland	George D. Widener Jr.	1-1/2 m	2:31.60	$40,800	
1956	Flower Bowl	4	Bill Shoemaker	Preston M. Burch	Brookmeade Stable	1-1/2 m	2:29.80	$40,100	
1955	Manotick	3	Angel Valenzuela	Casey Hayes	Christopher Chenery	1-1/2 m	2:31.40	$43,900	
1954	Lavender Hill	5	Stanley Small	Thomas W. Kelley	Mrs. Charles Silver	1-1/2 m	2:32.20	$43,400	
1953	La Corredora	4	Ira Hanford	Carl Hanford	Marian W. O'Connor	1-1/2 m	2:30.40	$40,900	
1952	How	4	Nick Shuk	Horatio Luro	Herman B. Delman	1-1/2 m	2:31.40	$40,900	
1951	Marta	4	Conn McCreary	Woody Stephens	Woodvale Farm	1-1/2 m	2:30.20	$21,250	
1950	Next Move	3	Eric Guerin	William C. Winfrey	Alfred G. Vanderbilt Jr.	1-1/2 m	2:29.40	$20,700	
1949	Gaffery	3	Eric Guerin	Richard E. Handlen	Foxcatcher Farm	1-1/2 m	2:29.80	$24,800	
1948	Miss Request	3	Ted Atkinson	James P. Conway	Florence D. Whitaker	1-1/2 m	2:30.00	$40,600	
1947	Snow Goose	3	Ted Atkinson	Oscar White	Walter M. Jeffords Sr.	1-1/2 m	2:29.60	$42,600	
1946	Athenia	3	Ted Atkinson	E. Leigh Cotton	Hal Price Headley	1-1/2 m	2:30.60	$16,700	
1945	War Date	3	Arnold Kirkland	Tom Smith	Maine Chance Farm	1-1/2 m	2:34.40	$11,730	
1944	Donitas First	3	Ted Atkinson	Preston M. Burch	Longchamps Farms	1-1/2 m	2:31.20	$11,040	
1943	Stefanita	3	Conn McCreary	Bert Mulholland	George D. Widener Jr.	1-1/2 m	2:31.80	$11,025	
1942	Vagrancy	3	James Stout	James E. Fitzsimmons	Belair Stud	1-1/2 m	2:31.20	$11,175	
1941	Up The Hill	3	Conn McCreary	George M. Odom	Marshall Field III	1-1/2 m	2:30.00	$11,800	
1940	Salamania	3	Don Meade	Duval A. Headley	Hal Price Headley	1-1/2 m	2:30.00	$12,250	
1939	Red Eye	3	Basil James	J. P. "Sammy" Smith	Falaise Stable	1 m	1:36.40	$5,900	
1938	Idle Miss	4	Alfred M. Robertson	B. Frank Christmas	B. Frank Christmas	1 m	1:37.60	$5,400	
1937	Genie Palatine	4	Charley Kurtsinger	Bert S. Michell	Jean Denemark	1 m	1:38.00	$2,405	
1936	Rust	4	Eddie Yager	Louis Strube	Louis Strube	1 m	1:38.40	$2,395	
1935	Vicaress	3	Eddie Arcaro	James E. Fitzsimmons	Belair Stud	1 m	1:37.40	$2,325	
1934	Coequel	3	Eddie Litzenberger	George E. Phillips	Maemere Farm (DeWitt Page)	1 m	1:37.40	$2,030	
1933	White Lies	3	Mack Garner	Henry McDaniel	Gertrude T. Widener	1 m	1:38.40	$1,030	
1932	Top Flight	3	Raymond Workman	Thomas J. Healey	C. V. Whitney	1 m	1:37.80	$2,275	
1931	Valenciennes	4	Charley Kurtsinger	William Knapp	Fannie Hertz	1 m	1:37.40	$2,725	
1930	Snowflake	3	Louis Schaefer	Jack R. Pryce	Walter J. Salmon Sr.	1 m	1:40.00	$4,375	
1929	Lace	4	Laverne Fator	John W. May	Mendham Stable (R. H. Williams)	1 m	1:38.20	$3,750	
1928	Twitter	3	Raymond Workman	James G. Rowe Jr.	Harry Payne Whitney	1 m	1:40.40	$3,275	
1927	Black Maria	4	Frank Colitelli	William H. Karrick	William R. Coe	1 m	1:39.80	$3,500	
1926	Black Maria	3	Laverne Fator	William H. Karrick	William R. Coe	1 m	1:38.80	$3,175	
1925	Whetstone	4	Albert M. Johnson	Gwyn R. Tompkins	Glen Riddle Farm	1 m	1:37.80	$3,400	
1924	Relentless	3	John Maiben	Matthew P. Brady	Joseph E. Davis	1 m	1:38.00	$3,725	
1923	Solisa	3	Benny Marinelli	Scott P. Harlan	Greentree Stable	1 m	1:38.80	$3,325	
1922	Many Smiles	3	Charles Fairbrother	William H. Karrick	William R. Coe	1 m	1:37.20	$2,475	
1921	Pen Rose	5	Laverne Fator	Dan Kearney	Triple Spring Farm	1 m	1:40.60	$1,745	
1920	Milkmaid	4	Earl Sande	H. Guy Bedwell	J. K. L. Ross	1 m	1:38.20	$3,175	
1919	Salvestra	4	Edward Taplin	Frank M. Taylor	John J. Hallenbeck	1 m	1:37.60	$1,955	
1918	Eyelid	3	Morris Rowan	Richard O. Miller	Anthony L. Aste	1 m	1:40.00	$2,130	
1917	Rhine Maiden	5	Raymond Ball	Frank Devers	Edward F. Whitney	1 m	1:41.00	$2,060	
1916	Celandria	3	Mack Garner	James A. McLaughlin	Elkwood Park Stable (Frederick Lewisohn)	1 m	1:41.00	$1,610	
1915	Addie M.	4	George Byrne	George W. Langdon	John W. Messervy	1 m	1:39.20	$1,450	
1914	Flying Fairy	4	Tommy Davies	J. Simon Healy	Edward B. Cassatt	1 m	1:38.00	$2,110	
1913	Flamma	4	Herman Radtke	Paul Maderia	E. F. Condran	1 m	1:39.60	$1,720	
1912	No races held due to the Hart–Agnew Law.								
1911	No races held due to the Hart–Agnew Law.								
1910	Ocean Bound	3	Guy Garner	French Brooks	Woodford Clay	1 m	1:43.00	$1,520	
1909	Maskette	3	James Butwell	James G. Rowe Sr.	James R. Keene	1 m	1:39.00	$6,630	
1908	Stamina	3	Eddie Dugan	A. Jack Joyner	Harry P. Whitney	1 m	1:40.60	$6,385	
1907	Yankee Girl	3	Herman Radtke	George P. Brazier	Charles R. Ellison	1 m	1:40.60	$5,405	
1906	Perverse	3	Lucien Lyne	John W. Rogers	Harry P. Whitney	1 m	1:39.80	$5,000	
1905	Flinders	3	Lucien Lyne	John Allen	Chelsea Stable (Ernest La Montagne & Russell Tucker)	1 m	1:42.40	$5,345	
1904	Beldame	3	Gene Hildebrand	Fred Burlew	Newton Bennington	1 m	1:41.20	$4,870	
1903	Girdle	3	Tommy Burns	John W. Rogers	William Collins Whitney	1 m	1:42.20	$3,445	
1902	Blue Girl	3	Tommy Burns	John W. Rogers	William Collins Whitney	1 m	1:42.00	$2,395	
1901	Janice	3	Joe Piggott	Green B. Morris	Green B. Morris	1 m	1:45.25	$2,485	
1900	Oneck Queen	3	Danny Maher	Walter C. Rollins	Oneck Stable	1 m	1:40.75	$2,600	
1899	Prestidigitatrice	3	Fred Littlefield	Robert J. Walden	Alfred H. & Dave H. Morris	1 m	1:43.00	$2,340	
1898	Geisha	3	Tod Sloan	William H. Karrick	Arthur White	1 m	1:43.00	$2,240	
1897	Divide	3	Fred Taral	Edward F. Hughes	Kensico Stable (J. P. Kramer & Anthony L. Aste)	1 m	1:44.00	$2,550	
1896	Intermission	3	Fred Littlefield	Ed Wall	John E. McDonald	1 m	1:43.50	$1,425	
1895	Race not held								
1894	Nahma	3	Fred Littlefield	R. Wyndham Walden	John A. & Alfred H. & Dave H. Morris	1-1/16 m	1:49.00	$4,600	
1893	Naptha	3	Willie Simms	William J. Speirs	William James Speirs	1-1/16 m	1:49.00	$2,930	
1892	Yorkville Belle	3	Isaac Murphy	Matthew M. Allen	Frank A. Ehret	1 m, 1 f	1:56.50	$3,530	
1891	Castalia	3	Fred Taral	William H. McCarthy	David D. Withers	6.36 f	1:20.50	$3,420	
1890	Sinaloa II	3	Shelby Barnes	Robert E. Campbell	Santa Anita Stable	6.36 f	1:19.00	$5,670	
1889	Fides	3	Edward Garrison	James G. Rowe Sr.	August Belmont Sr.	1 m, 1 f	2:00.50	$4,040	
1888	Bella B.	3	Jim McLaughlin	Frank McCabe	Dwyer Brothers Stable	1-1/4 m	2:14.50	$2,970	
1887	Firenze	3	Fred Littlefield	Matthew Byrnes	James B. A. Haggin	1-1/4 m	2:14.75	$2,670	
1886	Bandala	3	Jim McLaughlin	Charles S. Littlefield	Richmond Stable	1-1/4 m	2:12.50	$2,270	
1885	Miss Palmer	3	Jim McLaughlin	Andrew Thompson	John E. McDonald	1-1/2 m	2:47.50	$2,120	
1884	Duchess	3	William Donohue	Evert V. Snedecker	E. V. Snedeker & Co.	1-1/2 m	2:46.00	$2,360	
1883	Miss Woodford	3	Jim McLaughlin	James G. Rowe Sr.	Dwyer Brothers Stable	1-1/2 m	2:43.50	$3,040	
1882	Hiawasse	3	Matthew Feakes	Matthew Byrnes	Pierre Lorillard IV	1-1/2 m	2:44.00	$2,800	
1881	Aella	3	Tom Costello	R. Wyndham Walden	George L. Lorillard	1-1/2 m	2:51.00	$2,400	
1880	Carita	3	William Hayward	Jacob Pincus	August Belmont Sr.	1-1/2 m	2:44.50	$2,350	
1879	Ferida	3	Tom Costello	R. Wyndham Walden	George L. Lorillard	1-1/2 m	2:47.00	$2,900	
1878	Invermoor	3	John Sparling	Barney Riley	David D. Withers	1-1/2 m	2:46.75	$3,000	
1877	Idalia	3	George Barbee	R. Wyndham Walden	George L. Lorillard	1-1/2 m	2:41.00	$3,300	
1876	Sultana	3	William Hayward	Jacob Pincus	August Belmont Sr.	1-1/2 m	2:46.00	$2,950	
1875	Olitipa	3	George Evans	Jacob Pincus	August Belmont Sr.	1-1/2 m	2:42.75	$2,850	
1874	Bonaventure	3	William Lakeland		William Cottrill	1-1/2 m	2:42.25	$2,850	
1873	Katie Pease	3	James G. Rowe Sr.	Col. David McDaniel	Col. David McDaniel	1-5/8 m	2:58.25	$3,150	
1872	Victoria	3	Gradwell	Jacob Pincus	August Belmont Sr.	1-5/8 m	3:11.00	$2,800	
1871	Nellie Gray	3	Robert Swim		Miles Kelley	1-5/8 m	3:03.00	$3,400	
1870	Annette	3	Wilson	Rollie Colston	Daniel Swigert	1-5/8 m	3:02.00	$2,800	
1869	Tasmania	3	C. Miller		David D. Withers & John F. Purdy	1-5/8 m	3:07.75	$2,150	
1868	Bonnie Braes	3	Hennessey		J. Eckerson	1-5/8 m	3:06.75	$1,850	

* In 2000, Pentatonic won the race, but was disqualified and set back to second.
- In 1974, Poker Night won the race, but was disqualified and set back to second.
- In 1970, Manta won the race, but was disqualified and set back to second.
