= Bowling Brook =

British-bred Thoroughbred racehorse

- Sire: Ayrshire
- Grandsire: Hampton
- Dam: Vacation
- Damsire: Tom Ochiltree
- Sex: Stallion
- Foaled: 1895
- Country: Great Britain
- Colour: Bay
- Breeder: John A. Morris
- Owner: Alfred H. Morris and Dave H. Morris.
- Trainer: R. Wyndham Walden
- Record: Not found
- Earnings: Not found

Major wins
- Double Event Stakes #1 (1897); Metropolitan Handicap (1898); American Classic Race wins: Belmont Stakes (1898)

Bowling Brook (foaled 1895) was a British-bred American-trained Thoroughbred racehorse.

== Background ==
His sire, Ayrshire, won two of the British Classic Races, the 1888 Epsom Derby and 2,000 Guineas. Grandsire Hampton was the Leading sire in Great Britain & Ireland in 1887, and the Champion broodmare sire in 1901 and 1905. Bowling Brook was out of the American mare Vacation who was sired by the 1875 Preakness Stakes winner, Tom Ochiltree. He was bred by John A. Morris who died the year he was foaled but was raced by his sons Alfred and Dave.

Bowling Brook was trained by future U.S. Racing Hall of Fame inductee, R. Wyndham Walden. He was given the name of his trainer's Bowling Brook Farm at Middleburg in Carroll County, Maryland.

== Racing career ==
Racing as a juvenile, his best result in a major race was as runner-up in the Tremont Stakes. As a three-year-old, at Morris Park Racecourse in The Bronx, New York, Bowling Brook handily won the 1898 Metropolitan Handicap then three weeks later at the same track, jockey Fred Littlefield rode him to victory in the 1 3/8 miles Belmont Stakes. Bowling Brook won on a muddy track by six lengths over the Mike Dwyer-owned and Tod Sloan-ridden colt Previous with Hamburg approximately another ten lengths back in third place. Owned by Marcus Daly and ridden by Fred Taral, future U.S. Racing Hall of Fame inductee Hamburg had been the betting favorite to win.

== Stud career ==
Retired to stud duty, Bowling Brook met with limited success as a sire.
