= Pimlico Race Course =

Horse racetrack in Baltimore, United States

Coordinates: 39°21′13″N 76°40′23″W

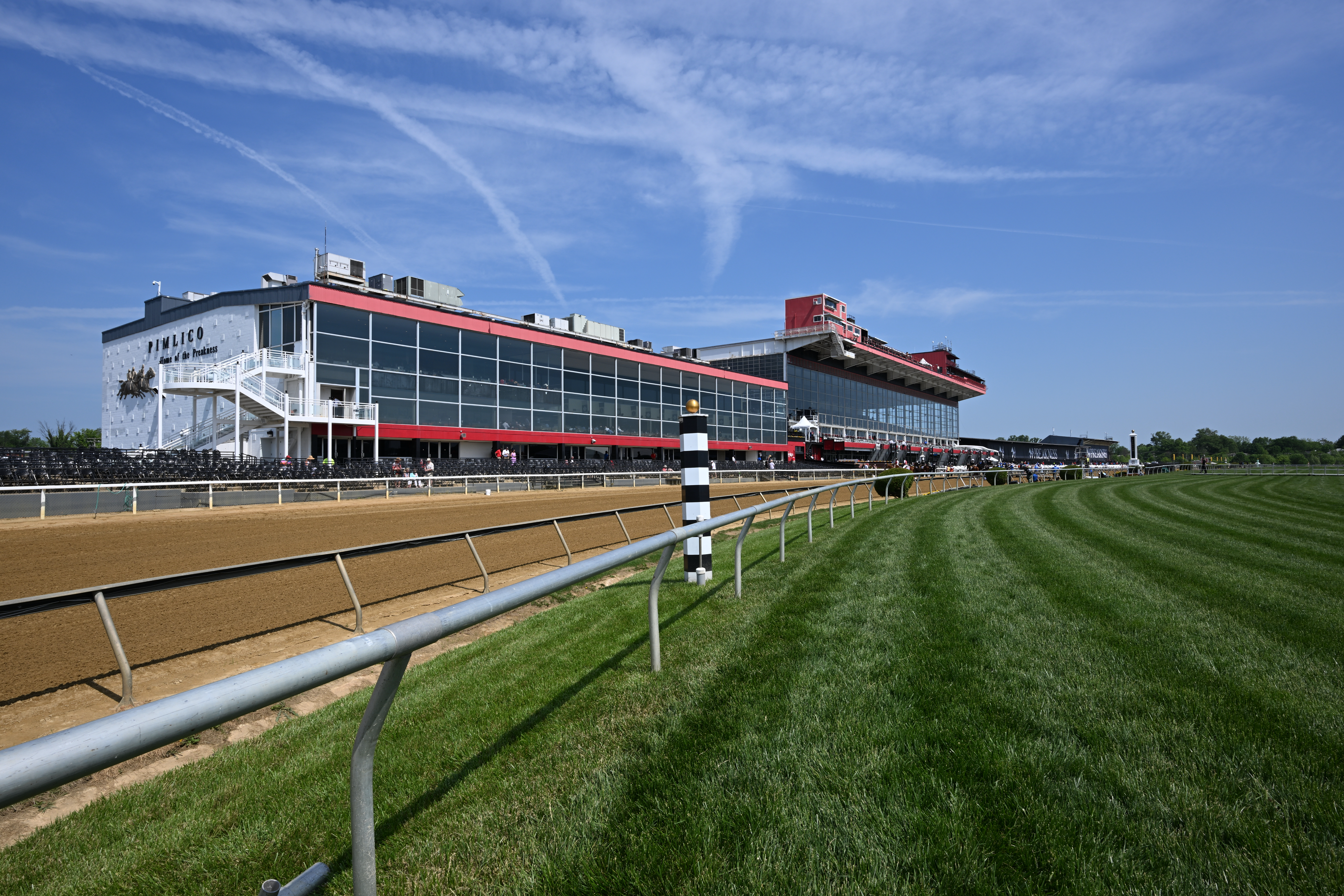
- Pimlico in May 2022
- Interactive map of Pimlico Race Course
- Location: 5201 Park Heights Avenue; Baltimore, Maryland, U.S.
- Owned by: Maryland Jockey Club (Maryland Thoroughbred Racetrack Operating Authority)
- Date opened: 1870; 156 years ago
- Screened on: NBC (Preakness Stakes)
- Course type: Flat
- Notable races: Preakness Stakes (G1); Black-Eyed Susan Stakes (G2); Dinner Party Stakes (G3); Pimlico Special (G3); James W. Murphy Stakes
- Live racing handle: ▲$181,000,000 (2014)
- Attendance: ▲351,146 (2014)

Pimlico Race Course is a thoroughbred-horse race-track in Baltimore, Maryland, United States, which hosts the Preakness Stakes (the second leg of the Triple Crown). Its name originated in the 1660s when English settlers named the area where the facility currently stands in honor of Olde Ben Pimlico's Tavern in London. The racetrack is nicknamed "Old Hilltop" after a small rise in the infield that became a favorite gathering place for thoroughbred trainers and race enthusiasts.

Pimlico was owned by the Stronach Group from 2011 until 2024, when ownership transferred to the state-run Maryland Thoroughbred Racetrack Operating Authority (MTROA). Pimlico closed for renovations in September 2024, with all of Pimlico's racing-dates except for the 2025 Preakness Stakes transferred to Laurel Park until completion of the project.

== History ==
Pimlico officially opened in the October 25, 1870, with the colt Preakness winning the first running of the Dinner Party Stakes. Approximately 12,000 people attended, many taking special race trains arranged by the Northern Central Railway. Three years later the horse would have the 1873 Preakness Stakes named in his honor.

=== "The Great Race" ===
On October 24, 1877, the United States Congress shut down for a day so its members could attend a horse race at Pimlico. The event was a 2½-mile match race run by a trio of champions: Ten Broeck, Tom Ochiltree, and Parole.

Ten Broeck, the Kentucky champion, was owned by Frank B. Harper. Tom Ochiltree, the Eastern champion and winner of the 1875 Preakness Stakes, was owned by George L. Lorillard, an heir to the Lorillard tobacco fortune. Parole, a gelding, was owned by Pierre Lorillard IV. Parole, with William Barrett up, prevailed with a late run, crossing the finish line three lengths ahead of Ten Broeck and six ahead of Tom Ochiltree, which had helped to set the early pace with Barbee in the irons. An estimated 20,000 people crowded into Pimlico to witness the event.

The event is depicted in a four-ton stone bas relief—copied from a Currier & Ives print and sculpted in stone by Bernard Zuckerman—hanging over the clubhouse entrance at Pimlico. It is 30 feet (9.1 m) long and 10 feet (3.0 m) high and is gilded in 24-karat gold leaf.

=== 20th century ===
Pimlico Race Track weathered both the 1904 Great Fire of Baltimore and an anti-gambling movement in 1910. A bill sponsored by the state racing commission in 1949 to abandon the track was originally supported by Governor William Preston Lane Jr., who reversed his position in late March. As Alfred G. Vanderbilt said, "Pimlico is more than a dirt track bounded by four streets. It is an accepted American institution, devoted to the best interests of a great sport, graced by time, respected for its honorable past."

The track is also noted as the home for the match race in which Seabiscuit beat War Admiral in the second Pimlico Special, on November 1, 1938, before a crowd of 43,000.

The most notable architectural feature of the original racetrack was the members' Clubhouse, located on the first turn. A "steamboat Gothic-era" design, the Clubhouse was topped by a weathervane that was repainted each year in the colors of the winner of the Preakness. The old Clubhouse was restored in 1956, with private rooms on the third floor named after Triple Crown winners. The President's room contained racing archives, while the second floor contained the Jockey's Hall of Fame. The building was richly decorated and housed a notable collection of racing art. The building burned down when a fire started in the front rooms on June 17, 1966. The only item salvaged was the weathervane, which was relocated to a replica Victorian cupola in the infield.

=== 21st century ===
On March 23, 2010, an agreement was reached to sell the two Maryland Jockey Club tracks (Pimlico and Laurel Park) from Magna Entertainment Corporation to its parent company, MI Development. On May 7, Penn National Gaming, with MI Development, announced they would jointly own and operate the Maryland Jockey Club. Penn National, which began in 1973, operating the Penn National Race Course near Harrisburg, Pennsylvania, has grown to become the largest racetrack operator in the country.

In June 2011, The Stronach Group took control of the tracks when MI Development bought out Penn National Gaming's minority stake in the Maryland Jockey Club, which owned Laurel Park Racecourse, Pimlico, and Bowie Race Track which is used as a training facility. The Stronach Group is owned by Canadian horse breeder and owner Frank Stronach, who also was MI Development's chairman and chief executive, a position he gave up in order to run Maryland's racetracks. Penn National bought a 49% stake in the Jockey Club in 2010 in hopes of securing a slots license at Laurel Park.

In 2018, the track began using a GPS-based timing system.

=== Renovations ===
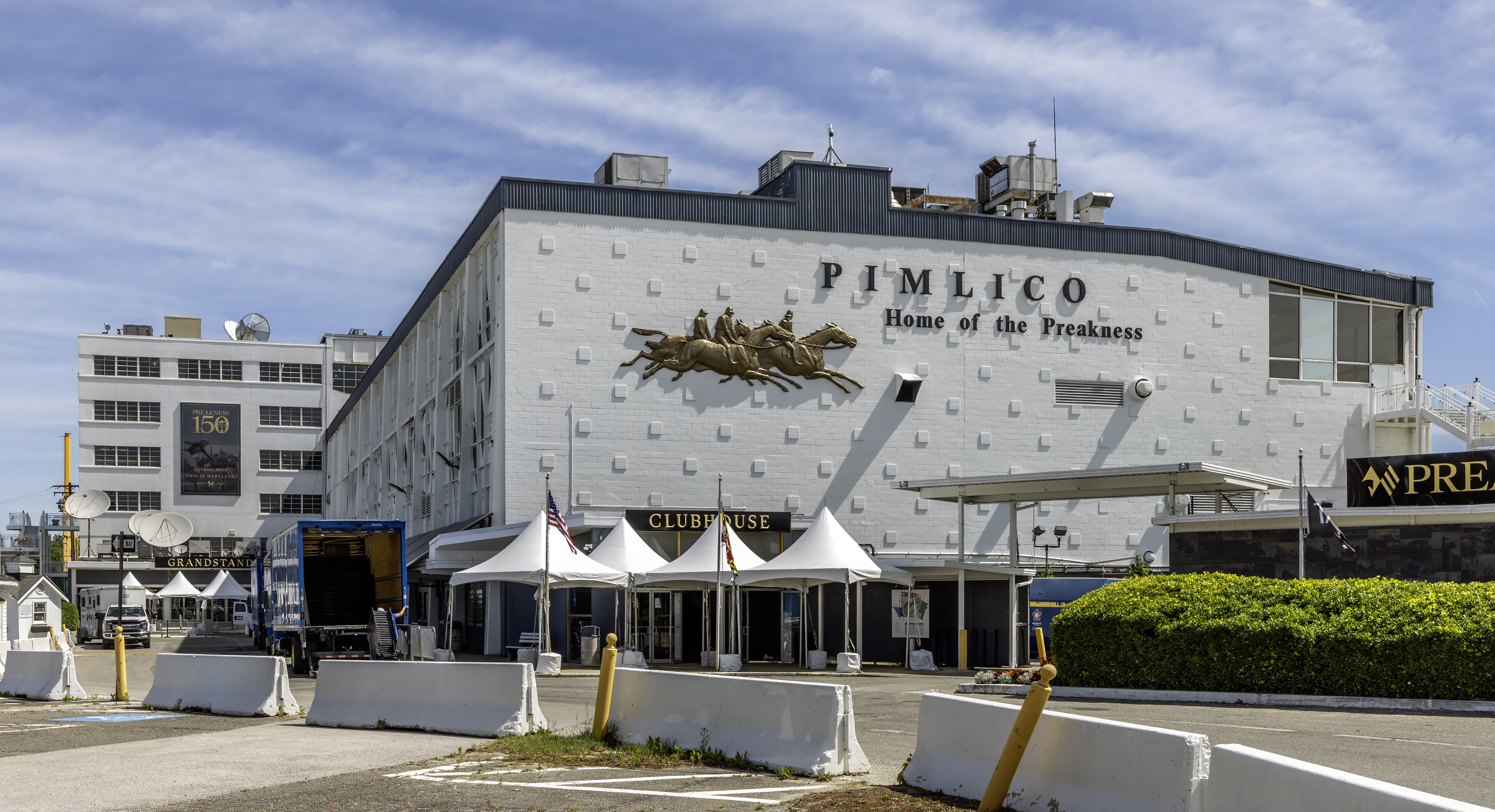
The clubhouse entrance to Pimlico after the 2025 Preakness Stakes

In February 2017, the Maryland Stadium Authority released the first phase of a study saying that Pimlico needed $250 million in renovations.

A December 2018 report suggested that the existing buildings should be demolished and rebuilt. In a meeting held in June 2018 by the Maryland Stadium Authority, locals "overwhelmingly supported upgrading the track property."

In October 2019, The Stronach Group reached an agreement in principle with the city of Baltimore and groups representing Maryland horsemen that would permanently keep the Preakness at Pimlico. As part of the agreement, The Stronach Group would donate both Pimlico and Laurel Park to newly established government entities that would oversee the properties, with Stronach licensed to conduct the race meets. Pimlico's grandstand would be demolished and replaced with a smaller structure, and temporary seating would be added to handle the attendance during Preakness week. The race track itself would be rotated 30 degrees in order to create nine parcels of land that could be sold for private development, and new barns for horses would be constructed.

The Racing and Community Development Act, approved by the Maryland General Assembly in May 2020, allowed the Maryland Stadium Authority to issue $375 million in bonds for the renovation of both Stronach Group tracks.

On March 14, 2024, the Stronach Group announced that it had reached a deal with the Maryland state government to transfer ownership of Pimlico to the new Maryland Thoroughbred Racetrack Operating Authority (MTROA), allowing for a multi-million dollar renovation project of the race course's track to begin and for the construction of a new training center at a separate location. The deal would also consolidate thoroughbred racing in Maryland to Pimlico and have the Maryland state government assume responsibility over racing operations. The General Assembly passed a bill ratifying the deal in April 2024, which provided for $400 million in state bonds to be used for renovations to Pimlico.

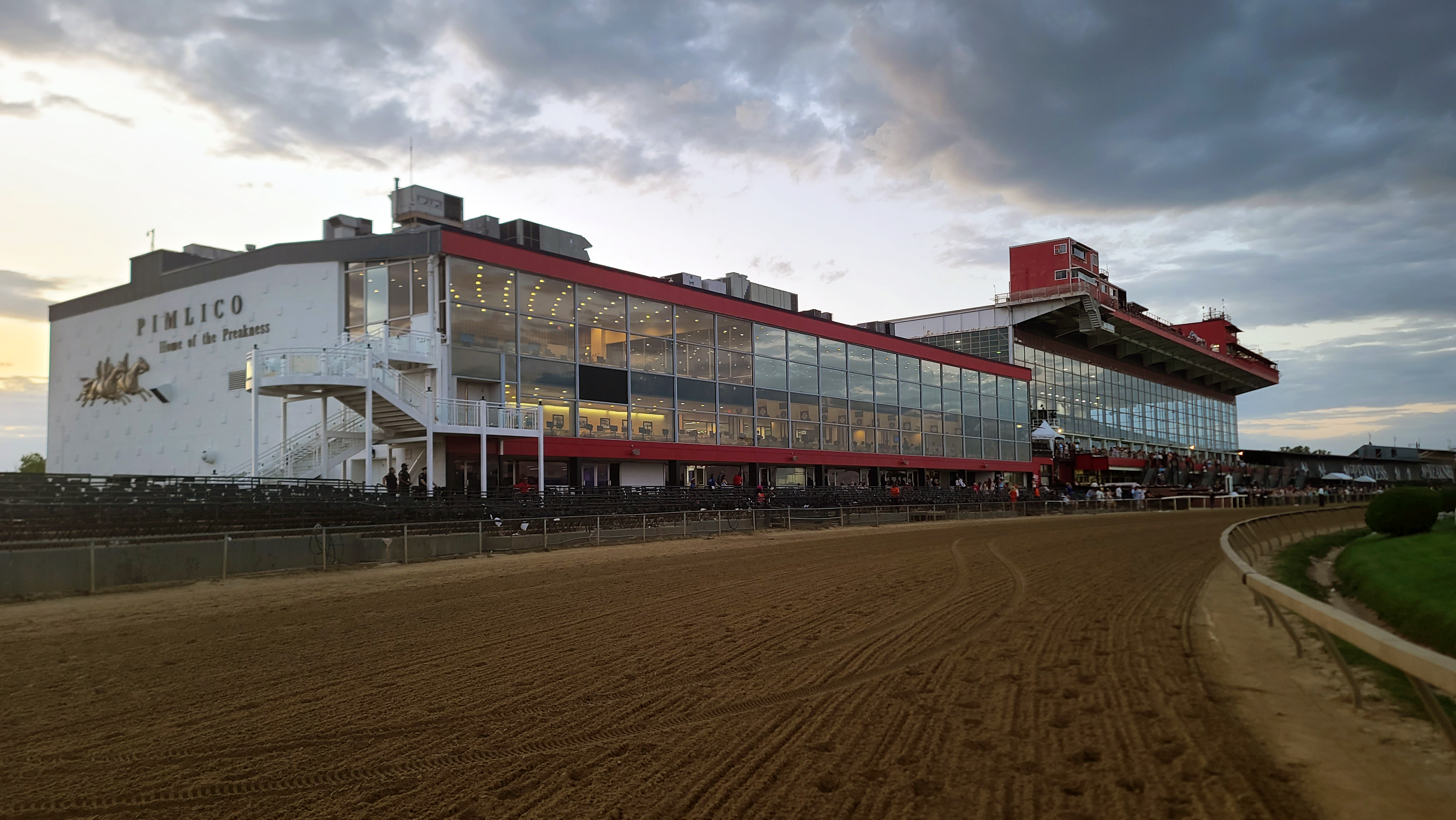
Pimlico's clubhouse in May 2025 prior to its demolition

The MTROA assumed ownership of the Pimlico property on July 1, 2024. On the same date, the Maryland Jockey Club announced that the entire Pimlico property would close on September 1, 2024, to begin the reconstruction project, with Laurel Park hosting day-to-day thoroughbred racing and training in Maryland until renovations are completed. Pimlico temporarily reopened in May 2025 to host the 150th Preakness Stakes, while the Preakness in 2026 would be held at Laurel. The new Maryland Jockey Club, as a non-profit entity of the MTROA, assumed control of thoroughbred racing in the state on January 1, 2025.

On May 7, 2025, the Maryland Board of Public Works approved the Pimlico reconstruction proposals from the Maryland Stadium Authority. Plans call for the new facility to include a hotel and event space. Demolition of the property commenced in July 2025, two months after that year's Preakness Stakes. By the end of September, the clubhouse and old grandstand had been torn down.

== Description ==
The track has a one-mile dirt oval, surrounding a seven-furlong (7/8 mile) turf oval. There are stables for about 1,000 horses. Pimlico's capacity, including the infield, is over 120,000 people.

The track area is bounded by Park Heights and Winner Avenues to the west, West Rogers Avenue and West Northern Parkway to the north, Preakness Way to the east, and West Belvedere Avenue to the south. (Its namesake street, Pimlico Road, runs from the city line near Greenspring Avenue to Park Heights Avenue south of Cold Spring Lane, but is rendered discontinuous to through traffic between Northern Parkway and Belvedere Avenue.)

== Racing ==
The races held at Pimlico, especially the Preakness, draw spectators from the Mid-Atlantic region. In 2007, the official attendance was 121,263 for the Preakness, the most people to watch a sporting event in Maryland history. More than $87.2 million in bets were made.

The Preakness Stakes and the Pimlico Special are run at a distance of 1-3/16 miles (9½ furlongs). The Pimlico track record for that distance is held by Farma Way, who set it while winning the Pimlico Special in 1991.

The following stakes are run at Pimlico (in order of grade, then year inaugurated):

Grade 1 Stakes Races:

- The Preakness Stakes (1873)

Grade 2 Stakes Races:

- George E. Mitchell Black-Eyed Susan Stakes (1919)

Grade 3 Stakes Races:

- Pimlico Special (1937)
- Gallorette Stakes (1952)
- Chick Lang Stakes (1975)
- Miss Preakness Stakes (1986)
- Maryland Sprint Stakes (1987)
- Dinner Party Stakes (1870)

Listed (ungraded) Stakes Races:

- James A. Murphy Stakes (1966)
- Hilltop Stakes (1973)
- Skipat Stakes (1993)
- Sir Barton Stakes (1999)
- Jim McKay Turf Sprint (2006)
- The Very One Stakes (1993)
- Allaire duPont Distaff Stakes (1992)

Other notable Stakes Races:

- Bowie Handicap (1909)
- Geisha Stakes (1973)
- Pimlico Nursery Stakes (1910)
- Pimlico Spring Handicap (1917)
- Deputed Testamony Stakes (1986)
- William Donald Schaefer Handicap (1994)
- Henry S. Clark Stakes (2001)
- Shine Again Stakes (2006)

== Non-racing events ==
Audience at the Virgin Festival in 2006

Pimlico Race Course was the original US site for Virgin Festival from 2006 through 2008. The first was held on September 23, 2006, featuring bands The Killers, Red Hot Chili Peppers, and The Who. In 2007, it was a two-day festival (August 4–5) and featured The Police, the Beastie Boys, The Smashing Pumpkins, and Velvet Revolver. Its name was altered, to Virgin Mobile Festival, when it returned to Pimlico on August 9–10, 2008, with five headliners: The Foo Fighters, Kanye West, Stone Temple Pilots, Jack Johnson, and Nine Inch Nails. The event moved to Merriweather Post Pavilion in 2009.

Since 2014, Pimlico Race Course has been home to Moonrise, an electronic dance music festival featuring artists such as Above & Beyond, Bassnectar, and Kaskade.

The Orthodox Jewish community nearby to the race track also use Pimlico Race Course to burn their chametz every year.

== Transportation ==
Pimlico Race Course is typically accessed from either the Rogers Avenue Metro Station to the west in Park Heights, Baltimore, and to the east by the Mount Washington Light Rail station in Mount Washington. For major events, a shuttle is typically in place by the Maryland Transit Administration going to the race course from light rail and metro stations.

== Notable people ==
- Joseph Leo Welsh, orchestra conductor, oddsmaker, and celebrity turf accountant
