= Africander (horse) =

American-bred Thoroughbred racehorse

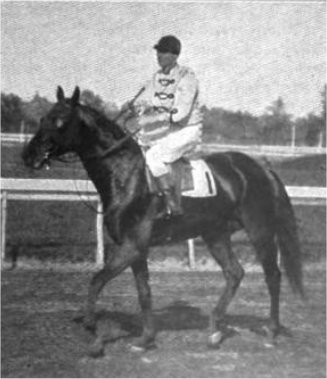
- Circa 1904
- Sire: Star Ruby
- Grandsire: Hampton
- Dam: Afric Queen
- Damsire: Darebin
- Sex: Stallion
- Foaled: 1900
- Country: United States
- Color: Bay
- Breeder: James B. A. Haggin
- Owner: 1) Julius Fleischmann; 2) Hampton Stable; 3) Simon Deimel (1904)
- Trainer: Thomas Welsh; Richard O. Miller; Frank D. Weir (7/1904)
- Record: 59: 19-14-10
- Earnings: US$101,345

Major wins
- Bedford Stakes (1902); Holly Handicap (1902); Winged Foot Handicap (1902); Advance Stakes (1903); Lawrence Realization Handicap (1903); Champlain Handicap (1903); Suburban Handicap (1903); Saratoga Cup (1903); Brighton Cup Trial (1904); Brighton Cup (1904) American Classics wins: Belmont Stakes (1903)

Awards
- American Champion Three-Year-Old Colt (1903)
- Last updated on April 1, 2010

Africander (foaled 1900 in California) was an American Thoroughbred Champion racehorse.

== Background ==
Africander was bred by James Ben Ali Haggin at his Rancho Del Paso horse farm near Sacramento. He was sired by Star Ruby, a son of Hampton, the 1877 Goodwood Cup winner and the British Champion sire of 1887. He was out of the mare, Afric Queen, whose sire was a Haggin import from Australia named Darebin who won the 1883 Sydney Cup. Africander was purchased by Julius Fleischmann.

== Racing career ==
=== 1902: two-year-old season ===
On May 30, 1902, Africander won the Bedford Stakes at Gravesend Race Track. On June 28, 1902, he was sold for $10,000 to Charles F. Dwyer and Simon Deimel, who raced him under the nom de course Hampton Stable. For his new owners, the colt lost his first few starts before winning a minor event at Brighton Beach Race Course. However, on July 29 at the same racetrack, he equaled the track record for 5 1/2 furlongs with a time of 1:06 3–5 in winning the Winged Foot Handicap. After an unsuccessful month of August, on September 9 Africander was sold to F. C. McLewee & Co subject to a veterinary examination. Rejected as unsound, on the morning of September 20, Africander was again offered for sale but was bought back by his owners. That afternoon, he won the Holly Handicap at Gravesend Race Track.

=== 1903: three-year-old season ===
At age three, in the pre-U.S. Triple Crown era, Africander won the Belmont Stakes at Morris Park Racecourse by three lengths.

On June 18, 1903, he won the important Suburban Handicap at Sheepshead Bay Race Track then nine days later at the same track he captured the Advance Stakes in track record time for one mile and three furlongs while defeating Brooklyn Handicap winner and 1902 Champion Two-Year-Old Irish Lad and third-place finisher Major Daingerfield. On July 7, he won the richest stake event for three-year-olds on the East Coast, the one mile and five furlong Lawrence Realization Handicap. On August 25 he won the mile and one-eighth Champlain Handicap at Saratoga Race Course.

In September 1903, Africander's handlers announced his retirement from racing. For the year, Africander was the leading earner among all American horses with $70,720.

=== 1904: four-year-old season ===
After a long rest, Africander's connections wanted to try to bring him back to racing. Under trainer Richard Miller, by early May 1904 the horse appeared to be returning to top form and was showing very good times in his workouts. On May 14, he returned to racing with a win under star jockey George Odom in a mile and three sixteenths handicap event at Morris Park Racecourse. At Gravesend, he won again on June 1 before finishing second in the June 7 Standard Stakes. At Sheepshead Bay Race Track, Africander ran sixth and last to winner Hermis in the June 16 Suburban Handicap.

In July 1904, the Dwyer/Deimel racing partnership was dissolved. At a Fasig-Tipton auction, Simon Deimel purchased one hundred percent ownership of Africander for $15,000. As Richard Miller was under contract to Dwyer, Simon Deimel hired trainer Frank Weir to condition the horse.

Sent to Saratoga Race Course, Africander won two races in August and was second to the filly Beldame in the August 20 Saratoga Cup. On September 13, 1904, Africander won the mile and a half Brighton Cup Trial, then four days later earned his most important win of the year, capturing the two and a quarter mile Brighton Cup.

== Stud career ==
Retired to stud having earned more than $100,000, Africander stood in the United States until 1910 when he was exported to Mr. Manuel Torres Cabrera in Argentina. He was not successful as a sire.

== Pedigree ==
Pedigree of Africander, bay stallion, 1900
Sire Star Ruby 1892	Hampton; 1872	Lord Clifden	Newminster
Sire Star Ruby 1892	Hampton; 1872	Lord Clifden	The Slave*
Sire Star Ruby 1892	Hampton; 1872	Lady Langden	Kettledrum
Sire Star Ruby 1892	Hampton; 1872	Lady Langden	Haricot
Sire Star Ruby 1892	Ornament; 1887	Bend Or	Doncaster
Sire Star Ruby 1892	Ornament; 1887	Bend Or	Rouge Rose
Sire Star Ruby 1892	Ornament; 1887	Lily Agnes	Macaroni
Sire Star Ruby 1892	Ornament; 1887	Lily Agnes	Polly Agnes
Dam Afric Queen 1895	Darebin	The Peer	Melbourne*
Dam Afric Queen 1895	Darebin	The Peer	Cinizelli
Dam Afric Queen 1895	Darebin	Lurline	Traducer
Dam Afric Queen 1895	Darebin	Lurline	Mermaid
Dam Afric Queen 1895	Cleo	The Ill-Used	Breadalbane
Dam Afric Queen 1895	Cleo	The Ill-Used	Ellermire
Dam Afric Queen 1895	Cleo	Cleopatra	Kentucky
Dam Afric Queen 1895	Cleo	Cleopatra	Babta (family: 26)

* Africander is inbred 5S x 4D to the stallion Melbourne, meaning that he appears fifth generation (via The Slave) on the sire side of his pedigree, and fourth generation on the dam side of his pedigree.
