= Saunterer =

American-bred Thoroughbred racehorse

- Sire: Leamington
- Grandsire: Faugh-a-Ballagh
- Dam: Lemonade
- Damsire: Lexington
- Sex: Stallion
- Foaled: 1878
- Country: United States
- Colour: Chestnut
- Breeder: Aristides Welch
- Owner: George L. Lorillard
- Trainer: R. Wyndham Walden

Major wins
- American Classics wins: Preakness Stakes (1881); Belmont Stakes (1881)

Saunterer was an American Thoroughbred racehorse. Ridden by Tom Costello, he won the 1881 Preakness Stakes and Belmont Stakes.

== Background ==
Saunterer was bred in Pennsylvania by Aristides Welch. His father was leading sire Leamington, and his dam was Lemonade, a daughter of leading sire Lexington. He was later sold to George L. Lorillard.

== Pedigree ==
Pedigree of Saunterer
Sire Leamington 1853	Faugh-a-Ballagh 1841	Sir Hercules	Whalebone
Sire Leamington 1853	Faugh-a-Ballagh 1841	Sir Hercules	Peri
Sire Leamington 1853	Faugh-a-Ballagh 1841	Guiccioli	Bob Booty
Sire Leamington 1853	Faugh-a-Ballagh 1841	Guiccioli	Flight
Sire Leamington 1853	Pantaloon Mare 1841	Pantaloon	Castrel
Sire Leamington 1853	Pantaloon Mare 1841	Pantaloon	Idalia
Sire Leamington 1853	Pantaloon Mare 1841	Daphne	Laurel
Sire Leamington 1853	Pantaloon Mare 1841	Daphne	Maid of Honor
Dam Lemonade 1862	Lexington 1850	Boston	Timoleon
Dam Lemonade 1862	Lexington 1850	Boston	Sister to Tuckahoe
Dam Lemonade 1862	Lexington 1850	Alice Carneal	Sarpedon
Dam Lemonade 1862	Lexington 1850	Alice Carneal	Rowena
Dam Lemonade 1862	Lilia 1856	Yorkshire	St. Nicholas
Dam Lemonade 1862	Lilia 1856	Yorkshire	Miss Rose
Dam Lemonade 1862	Lilia 1856	Victoire	Margrave
Dam Lemonade 1862	Lilia 1856	Victoire	Argentile
