= Joseph Leo Welsh =

Background information
- Born: December 8, 1924
- Origin: Baltimore, Maryland, United States
- Died: November 9, 2003 (aged 78)
- Occupations: Orchestra conductor, oddsmaker, and celebrity turf accountant

Joseph Leo Welsh (December 8, 1924 – November 9, 2003) was an American orchestra conductor, oddsmaker, and celebrity turf accountant at the Pimlico Racecourse during the mid twentieth century.

== Early life ==
Welsh was born to a family of modest means who lived at 318 South Exeter Street in the Little Italy section of Baltimore City. His father traveled extensively, and Welsh was raised predominantly by his mother. His mother hailed from a musical family and was an accomplished pianist. From an early age, Welsh exhibited an exceptional talent for music. Recognizing this talent, his mother contracted with a private tutor from whom Welsh learned to play the trumpet.

His lessons were discontinued at the age of seventeen when he was drafted into the US Army for service in the European theater during World War II. Welsh saw combat under General Patton in the Battle of the Bulge. He was wounded in action and returned to the United States before the end of the war for convalescence. He maintained contact with his comrades in arms for many decades after the war. Welsh remained active in military circles and served as Senior Vice Commander of the Baltimore section of the League of Disabled American Veterans.

== Musical career ==
Welsh briefly attended law school upon his return from military service. However, finding that a career in law was not his calling, he dropped out of law school to form his own orchestra. He became an orchestral conductor in the tradition of the American Big Band genre, naming his group The Versatilles. The Versatilles were a fixture in the Baltimore ballroom musical scene from the 1950s through the 1970s. Welsh's local fame as a musician earned him a position as trumpeter for the Post Call at the Pimlico Racecourse.

== Pimlico Racecourse ==
Welsh began working at the Pimlico Racecourse as trumpeter for the Post Call in 1957. He developed a keen interest in all things equestrian and a knack for choosing winning horses. Welsh's unusual ability to pick winning horses did not go unnoticed. He earned numerous celebrity clients as an oddsmaker and turf accountant. Welsh served as private turf accountant to Jackie Gleason, FBI director J. Edgar Hoover, along with various senators and congressmen who frequented the racecourse.

Welsh worked at the Pimlico Racecourse for three decades and developed a reputation for discretion and honesty. His expertise was sought at Laurel Park, Timonium Racecourse, and Prince George's Park on numerous occasions. Welsh was a close friend and colleague of Jimmy the Greek and served as his principle liaison at the Pimlico Racecourse. Welsh correctly predicted the Triple Crown winners in 1973, 1977, and 1978. In 1979, while working at Pimlico, Welsh lost his balance and fell from a high stool. The fall induced a cardiac arrhythmia that forced him to retire.

== Personal life ==
Welsh married Bessie Tangires, the daughter of a Greek restaurateur. The couple had two sons.

Welsh died in 2003 at the age of seventy-eight due to complications of a stroke. He was buried at the Riverside National Cemetery in Riverside, California.
