= Tom Ochiltree =

American thoroughbred racehorse

- Sire: Lexington
- Grandsire: Boston
- Dam: Katona
- Damsire: Voucher
- Sex: Stallion
- Foaled: 1872
- Country: United States
- Colour: Bay
- Breeder: Woodburn Stud (A. J. Alexander)
- Owner: J. F. Chamberlain; W. H. Chamberlain; George L. Lorillard
- Trainer: R. Wyndham Walden; Anthony Taylor
- Record: 33: 21-5-3
- Earnings: $41,455

Major wins
- Annual Sweepstakes (1875); Dixie Stakes (1875); Baltimore Cup (1876, 1877); Monmouth Cup (1876); Saratoga Cup (1876); Continental Cup (1876); Westchester Cup (1877); Grand National Handicap (1877); All-Aged Stakes (1877) American Classics wins: Preakness Stakes (1875)

Awards
- American Champion Three-Year-Old Male Horse (1875); American Co-Champion Older Male Horse (1876)

Honours
- United States Racing Hall of Fame inductee (2016)

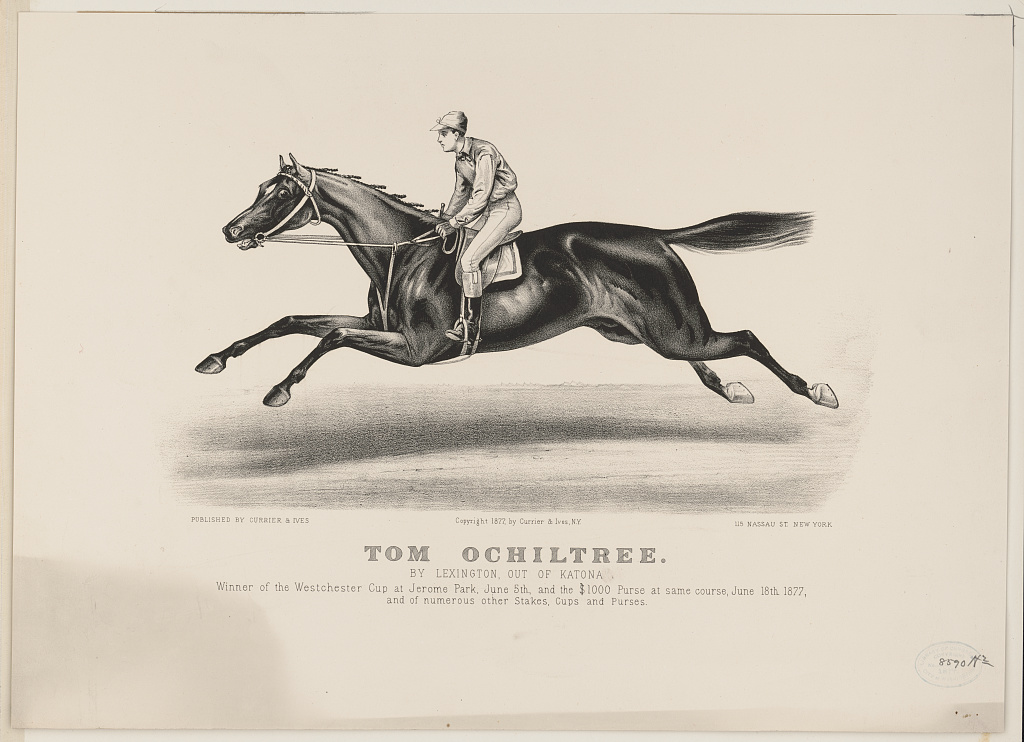

Tom Ochiltree (1872–1897) was an American Thoroughbred racehorse who won the 1875 Preakness Stakes and several other major stakes. In 1877, he lost in one of the most famous match races of the nineteenth century – a race that had been so anticipated that both houses of Congress were adjourned so members could attend. In 2016, Tom Ochiltree was inducted into the National Museum of Racing and Hall of Fame.

== Background ==
Tom Ochiltree was bred by A.J. Alexander's Woodburn Stud and was one of the last offspring of the great foundation stallion, Lexington. He was an enormous colt, eventually reaching 17 hands (68 inches, 173 cm) high with a girth of 76 inches. According to racing historian Walter Vosburgh, "For size, bone, and coarseness, Tom Ochiltree surpassed all contemporaries."

Purchased by J. F. Chamberlain at the 1873 Woodburn yearling sale for $500, he was later resold to tobacco heir George Lynde Lorillard. He was named after Colonel Thomas P. Ochiltree, who joined the Texas Rangers at age 14, fought for the Confederacy during the Civil War, became a newspaper editor and served as a United States Congressman. The colt was originally trained by Hall of Fame conditioner Wyndham Walden, the founder of Bowling Brook Farm in Carroll County, Maryland).

Tom Ochiltree had two great rivals, Ten Broeck and Parole. Ten Broeck was foaled in the same year as Tom Ochiltree at the neighboring Nantura Stock Farm. Parole was born one year later, bred by Pierre Lorillard IV, the brother and racing rival of Tom Ochiltree's owner. In 1877, these three would ignite the racing world in one of its biggest match races.

== Racing career ==
Tom Ochiltree did not race at age two due to his continued growth. At three, he won in his career debut in a six-furlong race at Pimlico Racetrack. Two days later, he returned to win the third running of the Preakness Stakes, then run at a distance of 1 1/2 miles. He then finished third in the Belmont Stakes and Jersey Derby, and last in the Ocean Hotel Stakes. He was given some time off and was switched to trainer Anthony Taylor. Returning in October, he won the 2 1/2 mile Annual Stakes and the two-mile Dixie Stakes before finishing third in the Breckenridge Stakes to Aristides, winner of the first Kentucky Derby. Tom Ochiltree finished 1875 with a record of four wins from nine starts and earnings of $6,150.

At age four, Tom Ochiltree returned to trainer Walden and became one of the top handicap horses on the East Coast. He won eight of ten starts, including the Baltimore Cup at 2 1/4 miles, the Jockey Club Handicap at two miles, the Centennial Stakes at 2 3/4 miles, the Monmouth Cup at 2 1/2 miles, Capital Stakes at three miles, Saratoga Cup at 2 1/4 miles, Maturity Stakes at three miles and the Centennial Cup at four miles. One of his few losses that year was to Parole in the 1 1/4-mile All Ages Sweepstakes, but he then beat Parole in the Saratoga Cup despite carrying 21 more pounds than his rival.

At age 5, Tom Ochiltree won nine of 14 starts, also finishing second four times. His wins included the Westchester Cup at 2 1/4 miles, the Grand National Handicap at 2 1/4 miles, the All-Aged Stakes at 1 1/4 miles and a second Baltimore Cup at 2 1/4. He beat Parole in both the Grand National and All-Aged Stakes, carrying higher weights every time.

At the same time, Ten Broeck was winning all his races. These two were then considered the best horses in the Union, with Parole a distant third. In those days, that could mean only one thing: a match race.

=== The Pimlico Match ===
On October 24, 1877, at Baltimore, Maryland's Pimlico a "match" race was run between Parole, Ten Broeck and Tom Ochiltree. It was scheduled for the first day of the October meeting of the Maryland Jockey Club. By this time Ten Broeck ("King of the Western Turf") was winning everything in the midwest, while Tom Ochiltree and Parole were exchanging wins on the east coast that were so heated that a backer of Parole attempted to poison Tom Ochiltree, an attempt that sickened his stablemate Leander instead. That July Parole had beaten Tom Ochiltree in the Saratoga Cup but Tom Ochiltree had come back and beaten Parole twice that October in the Grand National Stakes and All-Aged Handicap. On the day of the three-way match, perhaps 20,000 people showed up, filling every place in the stands or sitting in their carriages to watch. Both houses of Congress adjourned so that members could attend. At 3:15 in the afternoon, the horses went to post. Ten Broeck wore red ribbons in his mane, his stable colors. Parole wore cherry and black. Tom Ochiltree wore orange and blue. In the two-and-one-half mile race, Ten Broeck immediately led, followed by Tom Ochiltree, then Parole. And so it went in this order for quite some time. Twice Tom Ochiltree made a bid for the lead and won it on his second try. Parole was still trailing. And then, suddenly, Parole came on with a rush, passed both horses, and won by four lengths.

=== Aftermath ===
The result was a surprise. No one had ever beaten Ten Broeck and Tom Ochiltree had beaten Parole more times than he was beaten. Later, the owners of both horses explained away their losses. Ten Broeck had been seen for some time before the race to have had a cough. As for Tom Ochiltree, before the race, Wyndham Walden had telegraphed George Lorillard to warn him Tom Ochiltree had a cough. Lorillard had instructed him to run Tom Ochiltree "…so as not to spoil the race." But he also put $500 on Parole's nose.

A gelding, Parole raced on, becoming one of the few American horses to win a major English race. Both Ten Broeck and Tom Ochiltree were retired to stud.

Tom Ochiltree died on December 29, 1897, at the Middleburg, Maryland farm of his owner Wyndham Walden at the age of 25. In 2016, he was inducted into the National Museum of Racing and Hall of Fame, joining both Ten Broeck and Parole.

== Sire line tree ==
- Tom Ochiltree
  - Tattler
  - Cynosure
  - Major Domo
  - Sluggard

== Pedigree ==
Pedigree of Tom Ochiltree
Sire Lexington 1850	Boston 1833	Timoleon	Sir Archy
Sire Lexington 1850	Boston 1833	Timoleon	Saltram Mare
Sire Lexington 1850	Boston 1833	Sister to Tuckahoe	Balls Florizel
Sire Lexington 1850	Boston 1833	Sister to Tuckahoe	Alderman Mare
Sire Lexington 1850	Alice Carneal 1836	Sarpedon	Emilius
Sire Lexington 1850	Alice Carneal 1836	Sarpedon	Icaria
Sire Lexington 1850	Alice Carneal 1836	Rowena	Sumpter
Sire Lexington 1850	Alice Carneal 1836	Rowena	Lady Grey
Dam Katona 1857	Voucher 1845	Wagner	Sir Charles
Dam Katona 1857	Voucher 1845	Wagner	Maria West
Dam Katona 1857	Voucher 1845	Britannia	Muley
Dam Katona 1857	Voucher 1845	Britannia	Nancy
Dam Katona 1857	Countess 1847	Margrave	Muley
Dam Katona 1857	Countess 1847	Margrave	Election Mare
Dam Katona 1857	Countess 1847	American Eclipse Mare	American Eclipse
Dam Katona 1857	Countess 1847	American Eclipse Mare	Rattler Mare
