= Winged Foot Handicap =

- Class: Discontinued stakes
- Location: Empire City Race Track, Yonkers, New York, United States; Brighton Beach Race Course, Brighton Beach, New York, United States
- Inaugurated: 1896
- Race type: Thoroughbred - Flat racing

Race information
- Distance: 6 furlongs
- Surface: Dirt
- Track: left-handed
- Qualification: Two-year-olds

The Winged Foot Handicap was an American Thoroughbred horse race open to two-year-olds of either sex. A race on dirt, it was run annually at Brighton Beach Race Course in Brighton Beach, New York from inception in 1896 through 1908 before being canceled for the next two years as a result of New York state's Hart–Agnew Law anti-betting legislation. The ensuing financial losses meant that the Brighton Beach Race Course was never able to reopen and in 1910 the race was revived at the Empire City Race Track for what would turn out to be its final running.

== Historical notes ==
The August 1, 1896 inaugural running of the Winged Foot Handicap was won by Voter, the second choice of the betting public. Ridden by Alonzo Clayton for the very prominent owner James R. Keene, Voter would go on to a successful career that would see him recognized as the American Champion Older Male Horse of 1899.

In 1899, Killashandra became the first of three fillies to win the Winged Foot Handicap. She continued to race successfully and in her three-year-old season was the dominant filly in her age group and would be recognized as the 1900 American Champion Three-Year-Old Filly.

Africander's winning time in 1902 of 1:06 3/5 for the six-furlong distance was not only the fastest time for the Winged Foot Handicap but equaled the track record. The following year, Africander would earn American Champion Three-Year-Old Male Horse honors.

Jockey LaVerne Sewell won the 1906 edition aboard Salvidere. The colt would earn recognition as that year's American Champion Two-Year-Old Male Horse. Tragically, Salvidere's eighteen-year-old jockey Sewell would be killed on November 9 as a result of a racing accident at Aqueduct Racetrack. In their story on the accident, The Pittsburgh Press called Sewell one of the most promising riders in the East.

The July 12, 1910 final running of the Winged Foot Handicap was the feature race of the day at Empire City Race Track. Newcastle Stable horses Danger Mark and Royal Meteor finished one-two in the field of five runners.

== Records ==
Speed record:

- 1:12 3/5 @ 6 furlongs: Master Robert (1907)

Most wins by a jockey:

- 2 - Joe Notter (1907, 1910)

Most wins by a trainer:

- 2 - A. Jack Joyner (1898, 1904)
- 2 - Thomas Welsh (1901, 1910)

Most wins by an owner:

- No owner won this race more than once.

== Winners ==
Year	Winner	Age	Jockey	Trainer	Owner	Dist. (Furlongs)	Time	Win $
1910	Danger Mark	2	Joe Notter	Thomas Welsh	Newcastle Stable	6 f	1:13.60	$925
1908	1909	Race not held						
1907	Master Robert	2	Joe Notter	Andrew G. Blakely	Samuel Emery	6 f	1:12.60	$2,520
1906	Salvidere	2	LaVerne Sewell	John E. Madden	Thomas Hitchcock Sr.	6 f	1:15.00	$3,265
1905	George C. Bennett	2	David Nicol	William E. Phillips	Frederick Cook	6 f	1:13.40	$2,770
1904	Tradition	2	Tommy Burns	A. Jack Joyner	Sydney Paget	6 f	1:13.80	$2,940
1903	Race not held							
1902	Africander	2	Jack Martin	Richard O. Miller	Hampton Stable (Sam Deimel & Charles F. Dwyer)	5.5 f	1:06.60	$2,590
1901	Alibert	2	Willie Shaw	Thomas Welsh	Julius Fleischmann	5.5 f	1:07.20	$2,430
1900	Princess Pepper	2	Henry Spencer	William M. Rogers	James E. Pepper Stable	5 f	1:01.00	$1,690
1899	Killashandra	2	Richard Clawson	Sydney Paget	William C. Whitney	5 f	1:01.00	$1,820
1898	Autumn	2	Danny Maher	A. Jack Joyner	A. Jack Joyner	5 f	1:02.25	$1,870
1897	Don't Care	2	Frank Stanhope	R. Wyndham Walden	R. W. Walden & Son	6 f	1:19.75	$1,420
1896	Voter	2	Alonzo Clayton	William Lakeland	James R. Keene	5 f	1:01.75	$1,130
