= LaVerne Sewell =

American jockey (1888–1906)

Personal information
- Born: July 14, 1888
- Died: November 9, 1906 (aged 18) Sheepshead Bay, New York, United States
- Occupation: Jockey

Horse racing career
- Sport: Horse racing
- Career wins: 308

Major racing wins
- Crescent Park Inaugural Handicap (1905); Crescent Park Speed Handicap (1905); Garden City Stakes (1905); Lynbrook Handicap (1905); Midway Stakes (1905); First Special Stakes (1905); Amsterdam Stakes (1906); Brighton Handicap (1906); Champlain Handicap (1906); Delaware Handicap; Fashion Stakes (1906); Great Eastern Handicap (1906); Hudson Stakes (1906); Invincible Handicap (1906); Myrtle Stakes (1906); Saratoga Handicap (1906); Saratoga Special Stakes (1906); Winged Foot Handicap (1906)

Honors
- Sewell (Cesarion – Ora Bailey, by Hanover)

Significant horses
- Court Dress, Dandelion, Hermis, Ram's Horn, Salvidere

LaVerne Sewell (July 14, 1888 – November 9, 1906) was an up-and-coming American thoroughbred racing jockey who was competing in only his second year of racing when he died at age eighteen as a result of a racing accident at New York's Aqueduct Racetrack.

In their reporting on LaVerne Sewell's death, the widely respected Daily Racing Form (DRF) called him "one of the best race riders on the American turf."

== Racing career ==
=== 1905 ===
LaVerne Sewell began his riding career in early 1905 and owner/trainer Charles E. Rowe had quickly recognized Sewell's potential and would sign him to a contract. In February, when Rowe registered some of his new two-year-olds, he named a colt by Cesarion, out of the mare Ora Bailey, "Sewell." Jockey Sewell soon justified trainer Rowe's confidence in him, displaying a high level of riding acumen during the spring race meet at Oaklawn Park in Hot Springs, Arkansas. Rowe then brought Sewell to race in Chicago and in October, he was competing in New York where his wins included the important First Special Stakes at Gravesend Race Track The DRF wrote that his riding at the winter meets in New Orleans was "especially noticeable and brilliant." Sewell ended his first year in racing with 129 wins, ranking him sixth in the United States.

=== 1906 ===
In the fall of 1906 LaVerne Sewell agreed to a new riding contract that guaranteed him an annual salary of $20,000 for giving first call on his riding service to stable owner John W. Gates. Based on inflation, that would equal just over $600,000 in 2021. As well, Sewell would, and did, ride for other owners whenever not needed by the Gates stable and the Pittsburgh Press estimated he could earn an additional $40,000 (today $1,200,000) that year.

Returning to New York to compete against the best jockeys in the country, LaVerne Sewell would win a number of stakes events including the Fashion Stakes for racing's preeminent trainer James G. Rowe Sr. at Belmont Park riding Court Dress who would go on to be recognized as that year's American Champion Two-Year-Old Filly. On his eighteenth birthday, Sewell won the important Brighton Handicap aboard Ram's Horn. In the late 19th and early part of the 20th century, the Brighton Handicap, along with the Suburban Handicap at Sheepshead Bay Race Track and the Metropolitan Handicap at Morris Park Racecourse, were the big three events of the Northeastern United States racing season.

LaVerne Sewell and Dandelion:
Dandelion (1902–1910) was an American thoroughbred racehorse bred and raced by Francis R. Hitchcock, a member of a prominent family of American sportsmen and the President of Saratoga Race Course. Dandelion was trained by future U.S. Racing Hall of Fame inductee John Madden.

In 1905 Dandelion had won the prestigious Travers Stakes and the Saranac Handicap. Hence, coming into the 1906 racing season much was expected from the colt but until August went winless and was beaten in important races. Dandelion ran second in the Metropolitan and Brooklyn Handicaps in which he was ridden by star jockey and future Hall of Fame inductee, Frank O'Neill. Dandelion finished second again in the Suburban Handicap under another future Hall of Famer Walter Miller who would finish 1906 with National Championship honors for most wins, a feat he would repeat in 1907.

The July 10, 1906, edition of the Daily Racing Form reported that Francis Hitchcock was negotiating with trainer Charles Rowe to acquire the services of LaVerne Swell. The result was that on August 2, 1906, Hickock's trainer John Madden gave Sewell the ride on Dandelion in the mile and one-quarter Invincible Handicap at Brighton Beach Race Course. As the Daily Racing Form reported, "Dandelion finally won a race [...] after an errorless ride on the part of jockey Sewell." Four days later Swell was again aboard Dandelion, scoring an impressive win in the Saratoga Handicap at Saratoga Race Course breaking the track record by 3/5 of a second for the mile and one-quarter event on dirt with a winning time of 2:04 2/5. Tangle, also owned by Francis Hitchcock, finished second under jockey Walter Miller. The Invincible and Saratoga Handicaps had been the two big events of that New York state racing season. Following those successes, and still at the Saratoga track, Sewell and Dandelion won the August 14 Delaware Handicap and the August 30 Champlain Handicap.

=== Death ===
On November 9, 1906, LaVerne Sewell rode Lichtmess in the sixth and final race of the day at Sheepshead Bay Race Track. The Chart for the race shows that Sewell and Lichtmess were running fifth in a field of eight as they came down the homestretch. The Chart's comments stated that Herodotus had been "boring out all through the long stretch" and that Deuce, running second at the last turn had suddenly "bolted to the outside." While the Chart shows that Sewell's horse fell coming down the stretch there is no further comment as to what caused the fall that proved fatal for the jockey. The next day's Daily Racing Form reported that after Sewell' accident he was up and around saying he was okay. He was driven home by trainer Fred Burlew and accompanied by jockey Frank O'Neill. On the way he began passing out and once at home medical help was obtained but he died late that evening with what would be diagnosed as a ruptured kidney and internal bleeding.
