= Champlain Handicap =

Horse race in New York, United States

- Class: Discontinued stakes
- Location: Saratoga Race Course, Saratoga Springs, New York, Belmont Park, Elmont, New York Jamaica Racetrack, Jamaica, New York; United States
- Inaugurated: 1901
- Race type: Thoroughbred - Flat racing

Race information
- Distance: 6 furlongs (3/4 mile)
- Surface: Dirt
- Track: left-handed
- Qualification: Three-year-olds and up

The Champlain Handicap was an American Thoroughbred horse race for horses age three and older first run in 1901 at Saratoga Race Course in Saratoga Springs, New York. Placed on hiatus in 1945, it was revived in 1954 at Jamaica Racetrack as a sprint race restricted to fillies and mares. The race was discontinued after the 1957 running.

== Historic notes ==
The first running of the Champlain Handicap took place on August 27, 1901.

On August 29, 1907 Dandelion won the Champlain Handicap for the second straight year. He would be the only horse to ever win the race more than once.

In winning the 1919 edition of the Champlain Handicap, Willis Sharpe Kilmer's top runner Sun Briar broke Saratoga's track record for the mile and one-eighth distance on dirt with a time of 1:50 flat. In so doing, he defeated his stablemate and future Hall of Fame inductee, Exterminator. The following year Exterminator returned to compete in the 1920 running of the Champlain only to finish second again, this time to Gnome.

The 1938 Champlain Handicap was the fifth race on the card. It was preceded by the Rockton Handicap, a race named in honor of the 1901 inaugural winner of the Champlain.

Due to World War II, in May, 1942 the United States government's Office of Price Administration implemented gasoline rationing on seventeen East Coast states which included New York. Saratoga Springs Race Course relied upon a good attendance rate from New York city racing fans willing to make the 360 mile return trip but rationing would impact that for users of motor vehicles as well as passenger trains. As a result, the important Saratoga stakes races would be shifted to Belmont Park on densely populated Long Island in 1943 and 1944 where it was run as an event for three-year-old horses. The Champlain Handicap would never return to Saratoga.

== Records ==
Speed record: (Jamaica Racetrack)

- 1:11.00 @ 6 furlongs: Oil Painting (1955) & Gandharva (1956)

Speed record: (Saratoga Race Course)

- 1:50.00 @ 1-1/8 miles: Sun Briar (1919)

Most wins:

- 2 - Dandelion (1906, 1907)

Most wins by a jockey:

- 2 - George M. Odom (1902, 1904)
- 2 - Frank Keogh (1920, 1921)
- 2 - Laverne Fator (1928, 1932)
- 2 - Don Meade (1933, 1934)

Most wins by a trainer:

- 3 - Henry E. McDaniel (1919, 1931, 1933)
- 3 - Thomas J. Healey (1905, 1910, 1927)
- 3 - John E. Madden (1906, 1907, 1908)

Most wins by an owner:

- 4 - Harry P. Whitney (1914, 1923, 1924, 1928)

== Winners ==
Year	Winner	Age	Jockey	Trainer	Owner	Dist. (Miles) (Furlongs)	Time	Win $
Jamaica Racetrack
1957	Happy Princess	5	Ovie Scurlock	Gerald E. Lewis	Mabel D. Lewis	6 f	1:11.40	$16,350
1956	Gandharva †	4	Bobby Ussery	Preston M. Burch	Brookmeade Stable	6 f	1:11.00	$16,550
1955	Oil Painting	4	Hedley Woodhouse	MacKenzie Miller	Mrs. Joseph A. Goodwin	6 f	1:11.00	$11,500
1954	Gay Grecque	5	Willie Roland	Eugene Jacobs	Mrs. S. George Zauderer	6 f	1:12.00	$12,375
1952	1953	Race not held						
1951	Northern Star	3	Eric Guerin	John M. Gaver Sr.	Greentree Stable	6 F	1:11.40	$2,635
Belmont Park
1945	1950	Race not held						
1944	Stronghold	3	Robert Permane	James E. Fitzsimmons	Wheatley Stable	1-1/16 m	1:44.60	
1943	Famous Victory	3	Ted Atkinson	John M. Gaver Sr.	Greentree Stable	1 m	1:36.00	
Saratoga Race Course
1942	Race not held							
1941	Napper Tandy	6	Charles Dickey	Phil Schwartz	Phil Schwartz	1 m	1:39.60	
1940	Masked General	6	Maurice Peters	William Mulholland	Brandywine Stable (Donald P. Ross)	1-1/8 m	1:53.00	$1,975
1939	Sickle T	4	Ronnie Nash	Jack Howard	Florence D. Whitaker	1-1/8 m	1:51.00	$2,500
1938	Esposa	6	Nick Wall	Matthew P. Brady	William Ziegler Jr.	1-1/8 m	1:50.60	$2,350
1937	Thorson	5	Johnny Longden	Thomas H. McCreery	Buckley M. Byers	1-1/8 m	1:50.40	$2,500
1936	Count Arthur	4	James Stout	Lon Johnson	Fannie Hertz	1-1/8 m	1:52.20	$2,725
1935	Good Goods	4	Jack Westrope	Robert A. Smith	Brookmeade Stable	1-1/8 m	1:51.60	$2,600
1934	Mr. Khayyam	4	Don Meade	Matthew P. Brady	Catawba Stable (Madelaine Austin)	1-1/8 m	1:52.00	$2,900
1933	Sun Archer	3	Don Meade	Henry E. McDaniel	Willis Sharpe Kilmer	1-1/8 m	1:54.00	$2,870
1932	Reveille Boy	5	Laverne Fator	John A. Best	John A. Best	1-1/8 m	1:54.60	$3,200
1931	Curate	5	Mack Garner	Henry E. McDaniel	Joseph E. Widener	1-1/8 m	1:52.60	$3,825
1930	Caesarion	5	Donald Lyons	Bennett W. Creech	William R. Coe	1-1/8 m	1:53.00	$3,400
1929	Distraction	4	James H. Burke	James E. Fitzsimmons	Wheatley Stable	1-1/8 m	1:55.60	$3,775
1928	Victorian	3	Laverne Fator	James G. Rowe Jr.	Harry P. Whitney	1-1/8 m	1:51.00	$3,775
1927	Display	4	John Maiben	Thomas J. Healey	Walter J. Salmon Sr.	1-1/8 m	1:52.20	$3,450
1926	Peanuts	4	Harry Richards	George P. Odom	Robert L. Gerry	1-1/8 m	1:54.00	$4,200
1925	Big Blaze	4	Albert Johnson	Gwyn R. Tompkins	Glen Riddle Farm	1-1/8 m	1:54.00	$3,975
1924	Klondyke	3	Ivan Parke	James G. Rowe Sr.	Harry P. Whitney	1-1/8 m	1:52.40	$4,150
1923	Bunting	4	Linus McAtee	James G. Rowe Sr.	Harry P. Whitney	1-1/8 m	1:51.00	
1922	Mad Hatter	6	Earl Sande	Sam Hildreth	Rancocas Stable	1-1/8 m	1:51.20	$4,150
1921	Sennings Park	5	Frank Keogh	Scott P. Harlan	Westmont Stable (Lawrence Waterbury II & J. Leonard Replogie)	1-1/8 m	1:54.00	$4,175
1920	Gnome	4	Frank Keogh	William H. Brooks	Samuel Ross & Cary T. Grayson	1-1/8 m	1:53.20	$3,400
1919	Sun Briar	4	Willie Knapp	Henry E. McDaniel	Willis Sharpe Kilmer	1-1/8 m	1:50.00	$2,675
1918	Westy Hogan	4	Clarence Kummer	Sandy McNaughton	Wilfrid Viau	1-1/8 m	1:53.60	$2,675
1917	Clematis	4	Merritt Buxton	Thomas M. Murphy	Oscar Lewisohn	1-1/8 m	1:54.80	$2,325
1916	The Finn	4	Andy Schuttinger	Edward W. Heffner	Harry C. Hallenbeck	1-1/8 m	1:52.80	$1,925
1915	Star Jasmine	6	Eddie Martin	Thomas C. McDowell	Thomas C. McDowell	1-1/8 m	1:55.60	$1,925
1914	Pandean	4	Joe Kederis	Albert Simons	Harry P. Whitney	1-1/8 m	1:54.60	$1,925
1913	Cock o' the Walk	3	Buddy Glass	John P. Mayberry	Frederick Johnson	1-1/8 m	1:51.80	$1,925
1912	No races held due to the Hart–Agnew Law.							
1911	No races held due to the Hart–Agnew Law.							
1910	Olambala	4	James Butwell	Thomas J. Healey	Richard T. Wilson Jr.	1-1/8 m	1:55.00	$2,315
1909	Wise Mason	3	Eddie Dugan	Thomas Welsh	Newcastle Stable	1-1/8 m	1:53.80	$1,925
1908	Angelus	3	Caroll Shilling	John E. Madden	Thomas Hitchcock Sr.	1-1/8 m	1:54.80	$535
1907	Dandelion	5	Herman Radtke	John E. Madden	Francis R. Hitchcock	1-1/8 m	1:52.20	$2,300
1906	Dandelion	4	LaVerne Sewell	John E. Madden	Francis R. Hitchcock	1-1/8 m	1:54.00	$2,300
1905	Dolly Spanker	4	Lucien Lyne	Thomas J. Healey	Richard T. Wilson Jr.	1-1/8 m	1:53.00	$2,300
1904	Molly Brant	4	George M. Odom	Hubert H. Hyner	S. Sanford & Sons	1-1/8 m	1:56.40	$2,300
1903	Africander	3	Grover Fuller	Richard O. Miller	Hampton Stable (Charles F. Dwyer & Simon Deimel)	1-1/8 m	1:56.00	$2,295
1902	Advance Guard	5	George M. Odom	Alexander Shields	James Carruthers & Alexander Shields	1-1/8 m	1:51.40	$2,300
1901	Rockton	4	Willie Shaw	William Hayward Jr.	John Sanford	1-1/8 m	1:54.40	$2,300

- † Blue Sparkler finished first but was disqualified for interfering with runner-up Gandharva.
