= Tom Costello (jockey) =

American jockey

Personal information
- Born: 1866 New York State, United States
- Died: Unknown
- Occupation: Jockey

Horse racing career
- Sport: Horse racing
- Career wins: Not found

Major racing wins
- Ladies Handicap (1879, 1881); Flash Stakes (1881); Spinaway Stakes (1881); Long Branch Handicap (1882, 1883) American Classic Race wins: Preakness Stakes (1881, 1882); Belmont Stakes (1881)

Significant horses
- Saunterer, Vanguard

Tom Costello (born 1866 – unknown) was an American jockey in the sport of Thoroughbred horse racing who won three American Classic Races.

== Biography ==
As a young boy, Costello lived at the New York House of Refuge, a place for juveniles convicted of crimes or adjudicated as vagrants. He was one of a number of small boys given a place to live and work at the 800-acre (3.2 km^{2}) Long Island Thoroughbred racehorse farm of George L. Lorillard. There, Costello was given an education in a classroom built at the stables by Lorillard, who encouraged their studies and gave prizes to leading students.

Along with the other boys, Tom Costello helped maintain the stables and learned to ride horses. After a five-year apprenticeship, they were given a chance to become professional jockeys. Costello was highly successful and became wealthy from riding. According to an 1881 newspaper report, by age fifteen he was worth $30,000.

Tom Costello rode Lorillard's Saunterer to a win in the 1881 Preakness and Belmont Stakes and in 1882 captured his second Preakness Stakes on Lorillard's colt, Vanguard. In 1881 Tom Costello also rode Memento to victory in the inaugural running of the Spinaway Stakes at Saratoga Race Course; at Monmouth Park Racetrack in New Jersey, he won back-to-back editions of the Long Branch Handicap aboard Monitor.

== See also ==
- George L. Lorillard
- Long Branch Stakes
