= R. Wyndham Walden =

American racehorse trainer

- Occupation: Racehorse trainer
- Born: August 2, 1844 New York City, U.S.
- Died: April 28, 1905 (aged 60) Middleburg, Maryland
- Resting place: United Methodist Church Cemetery, Middleburg, Maryland

Major racing wins
- Monmouth Cup (1876); Saratoga Cup (1876); Flash Stakes (1877, 1878); Jerome Handicap (1878, 1888); Withers Stakes (1878); Travers Stakes (1878, 1880); Juvenile Stakes (1879, 1880, 1883, 1884, 1889, 1896); Foam Stakes (1880, 1887, 1890); Surf Stakes (1880, 1883, 1897); Champion Stakes (1883); Spring Stakes (1887); Reapers Stakes (1888); Zephyr Stakes (1888); Flight Stakes (1889, 1898); June Stakes (1889); Double Event Stakes (part 1) (1890, 1897); Double Event Stakes (part 2) (1890); Great American Stakes (1890, 1892); Tremont Stakes (1890, 1891); Hudson Stakes (1891); September Stakes (1891); Great Eastern Handicap (1894); Dash Stakes (1896); Sapphire Stakes (1896); Broadway Stakes (1897); Flying Handicap (1897); Tidal Stakes (1897); Winged Foot Handicap (1897); Autumn Maiden Stakes (1898); Metropolitan Handicap (1898); Twin City Handicap (1898); Fashion Stakes (1900) American Classic Race wins: Preakness Stakes (1875, 1878, 1879, 1880, 1881, 1882, 1888); Belmont Stakes (1878, 1880, 1881, 1898)

Honours
- National Museum of Racing and Hall of Fame (1970)

Significant horses
- Bowling Brook, Duke of Magenta, Harold, Monitor, Tom Ochiltree, Refund, Spinaway

Robert Wyndham Walden (August 2, 1844 – April 28, 1905) was one of the most successful American trainers in thoroughbred horse racing during the last quarter of the 19th century. He was inducted in the National Museum of Racing and Hall of Fame in 1970.

Known by his middle name, Wyndham, in 1872 Walden and his wife Caroline moved from New York City to Middleburg in Carroll County, Maryland where they established "Bowling Brook Farm" to breed and train thoroughbred race horses.

Wyndham Walden trained his first Preakness Stakes winner in 1875, Tom Ochiltree, then two years later began a streak of five straight victories, all of which came with horses owned by George L. Lorillard. Walden won the Preakness for a seventh time in 1888 with his own horse, Refund. The win set a record for a trainer which stood until 2023, when it was broken by Bob Baffert. During a career spanning thirty-one years between 1872 and 1902, he also won the Belmont Stakes four times and trained more than 100 Stakes race winners.

His son Robert J. Walden won the 1899 Kentucky Derby with Manuel, owned by the Morris brothers, Alfred and Dave.

His daughter, Minnie Walden, married jockey Fred Littlefield who rode Refund to his 1888 Preakness Stakes victory and was aboard Bowling Brook for the win in the 1898 Belmont Stakes.

On Wyndham Walden's death in 1905, Bowling Brook Farm was taken over by his wife, then on her death by their son Robert, who lived there until his death in 1951. Over the Walden family's eighty-year history in racing they raised and trained winners of more than one thousand races.

== Classic Race winning horses ==
Kentucky Derby:

- Manuel (1899)

Preakness Stakes:

- Tom Ochiltree (1875)
- Duke of Magenta (1878)
- Harold (1879)
- Grenada (1880)
- Saunterer (1881)
- Vanguard (1882)
- Refund (1888)

Belmont Stakes:

- Duke of Magenta (1878)
- Grenada(1880)
- Saunterer (1881)
- Bowling Brook (1898)
