= Richard O. Miller =

American jockey

Richard Miller
Personal information
- Born: 1875 Brooklyn, New York, United States
- Died: June 11, 1930 (aged 54–55) New York City, New York, United States
- Resting place: Cemetery of the Evergreens, Brooklyn, New York
- Occupations: Jockey, Trainer

Horse racing career
- Sport: Horse racing

Major racing wins
- Edgemere Handicap (1901); Seabreeze Stakes (1901); Carter Handicap (1902); Bedford Stakes (1902); Holly Handicap (1902); Jamaica Stakes (Brighton Beach) (1902); Myrtle Stakes (1902); Saratoga Handicap (1902); Thistle Stakes (1902); Winged Foot Handicap (1902); Advance Stakes (1903); Champlain Handicap (1903); Lawrence Realization Handicap (1903); Suburban Handicap (1903); Saratoga Cup (1903); Brighton Cup Trial (1904); Brighton Cup (1904); Spring Stakes (1904); Astoria Stakes (1908); Remsen Stakes (1909); Lynnbrook Handicap (1909); Arverne Stakes (1910); Tidal Stakes (1910); Williamsburgh Stakes (1910); Withers Stakes (1910); Midway Handicap (1915); Excelsior Handicap (1916); Paumonok Handicap (1916); Harford Handicap (1917); Alabama Stakes (1918); Ladies Handicap (1918); Yonkers Handicap (1919) American Classics wins: Belmont Stakes (1903)

Significant horses
- Africander, Ethics, Eyelid, Francesco, Sand Marsh, The Turk

Richard O. Miller (1875 – June 11, 1930) was an American jockey and a trainer of two National Champion Thoroughbred racehorses.

In 1890 Richard Miller went to work as an exercise rider for the prominent stable owner Michael F. Dwyer. He would ride for the stable for a short time before choosing to learn the business of training Thoroughbreds under the very capable Hardy Campbell Jr. In June 1895 Hardy Campbell Jr. died and Richard Miller took over.

The best horses Miller trained were Champions Africander and Eyelid. He trained Africander for Hampton Stable, the nom de course of the racing partnership of Simon Deimel & Charles F. Dwyer who purchased the colt on June 28, 1902. With Africander, Miller won the 1903 Belmont Stakes, a major racing event that became the third leg of the U.S. Triple Crown series. Africander would be named American Champion Three-Year-Old Horse for 1903.

Eyelid was owned by Anthony L. Aste and would be named the American Champion Three-Year-Old Filly for 1918 when her most important wins came in the Alabama Stakes and the Ladies Handicap.
