= Vanguard (American racehorse) =

American-bred Thoroughbred racehorse

- Sire: Virgil
- Grandsire: Vandal
- Dam: La Henderson
- Damsire: Lexington
- Sex: Stallion
- Foaled: March 24th, 1879
- Country: United States
- Colour: Bay
- Breeder: Milton H. Sanford
- Owner: George L. Lorillard
- Trainer: R. Wyndham Walden
- Earnings: $5,290

Major wins
- American Classics wins: Preakness Stakes (1882)

Vanguard was an American Thoroughbred racehorse. Ridden by Tom Costello, he won the 1882 Preakness Stakes.

== Background ==
Vanguard was bred in Kentucky by M. H. Stanford. His dam was La Henderson, a daughter of the influential sire Lexington. His father was the leading sire Virgil. He was foaled on March 24, 1879. Later on, he was sold to George L. Lorillard.

== Racing career ==
Vanguard raced nine times in his career, winning four. At three years old, he won the Preakness Stakes, ridden by Tom Costello. His overall career earnings were $5,290.

== Pedigree ==
Pedigree of Vanguard
Sire Virgil 1864	Vandal 1850	Glencoe*	Sultan*
Sire Virgil 1864	Vandal 1850	Glencoe*	Trampoline*
Sire Virgil 1864	Vandal 1850	Tranby Mare	Tranby
Sire Virgil 1864	Vandal 1850	Tranby Mare	Lucilla
Sire Virgil 1864	Hymenia 1851	Yorkshire	St Nicholas
Sire Virgil 1864	Hymenia 1851	Yorkshire	Miss Rose
Sire Virgil 1864	Hymenia 1851	Little Peggy	Cripple
Sire Virgil 1864	Hymenia 1851	Little Peggy	Peggy Stewart
Dam La Henderson 1865	Lexington 1850	Boston	Timoleon
Dam La Henderson 1865	Lexington 1850	Boston	Sister to Tuckahoe
Dam La Henderson 1865	Lexington 1850	Alice Carneal	Sarpedon
Dam La Henderson 1865	Lexington 1850	Alice Carneal	Rowena
Dam La Henderson 1865	Kitty Clark 1853	Glencoe*	Sultan*
Dam La Henderson 1865	Kitty Clark 1853	Glencoe*	Trampoline*
Dam La Henderson 1865	Kitty Clark 1853	Miss Obstinate	Sumpter
Dam La Henderson 1865	Kitty Clark 1853	Miss Obstinate	Jenny Slamerkin

* Vanguard is inbred 3S x 3D to the stallion Glencoe, meaning that he appears third generation on the sire side of his pedigree and third generation on the dam side of his pedigree.
