= David D. Withers =

American businessman & horse racing track owner and an owner/breeder (1822-1892)

David Dunham Withers
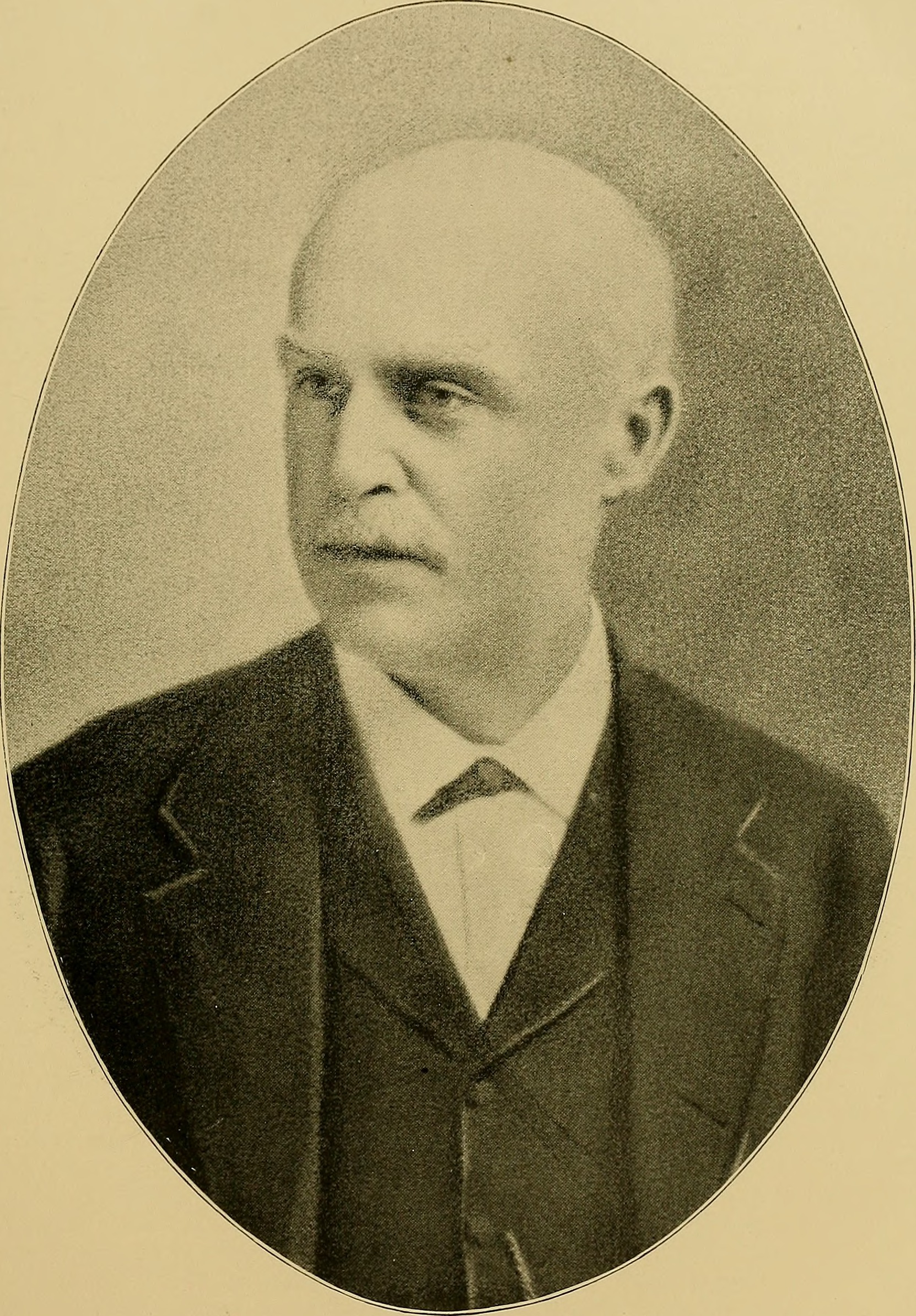
- From The American turf (1898)
- Born: David Dunham Withers; January 22, 1822; New York City, U.S.
- Died: February 18, 1892 (aged 70); New York City, U.S.
- Resting place: New York City Marble Cemetery
- Occupation(s): Thoroughbred owner/breeder Racetrack owner
- Honors: Withers Stakes at Aqueduct Racetrack

David Dunham Withers (January 22, 1822 – February 18, 1892) was an American businessman and a Thoroughbred horse racing track owner and an owner/breeder. His 838-acre (3.39 km^{2}) Brookdale Farm in the Lincroft section of Middletown Township, New Jersey, was the home of some of the finest bloodstock in the world.

== Early life ==
Withers was born on January 22, 1822, on Greenwich Street in what was then the most fashionable part of residential New York City. His father was Reuben Withers, who served as president of the Bank of the State of New York, and his mother was the daughter of David Dunham, a prominent merchant.

Withers was educated at Dr. Muhlenburg's School at College Point and thereafter entered the banking house of Howland & Aspinwall.

== Career ==
Heavily involved in the horse racing industry, David Withers served as the first president of the Board of Control which became The Jockey Club. In 1878, he partnered with Gordon Bennett Jr., George L. Lorillard and George P. Wetmore, to purchase Monmouth Park Racetrack near Red Bank, N.J.

== Personal life ==
Withers died in 1892 and was buried in the Marble Cemetery in New York City. According to his obituary in the February 27, 1892 edition of the Live Stock Record Withers "was the best racing authority in America."

=== Legacy ===
The Withers Stakes at Aqueduct Racetrack in Ozone Park, Queens, New York, is named in his honor.
