= George L. Lorillard =

American tobacco manufacturer and racehorse owner

- Born: George Lyndes Lorillard; March 26, 1843; Westchester, New York, U.S.
- Died: February 3, 1886 (aged 42); Nice, France
- Education: Yale Scientific School
- Spouse: Marie Louise La Farge (m. 1882)
- Parent(s): Pierre Lorillard III; Catherine Anne Griswold
- Relatives: Pierre Lorillard IV (brother); Pierre Lorillard II (grandfather); Catharine Lorillard Wolfe (cousin); Mary Lorillard (sister)

George Lyndes Lorillard (March 26, 1843 – February 3, 1886) was an American tobacco manufacturer, yachtsman, and a prominent Thoroughbred racehorse owner.

== Early life ==
He was born in Westchester, New York, the son of Pierre Lorillard III (1796-1867) and Catherine Griswold. In 1760, his great-grandfather founded P. Lorillard and Company in New York City to process tobacco, cigars, and snuff. Lorillard Tobacco Company remains the oldest tobacco company in the United States to this day.

Lorillard graduated with a degree in medicine from the Yale Scientific School in 1862.

== Yachting ==
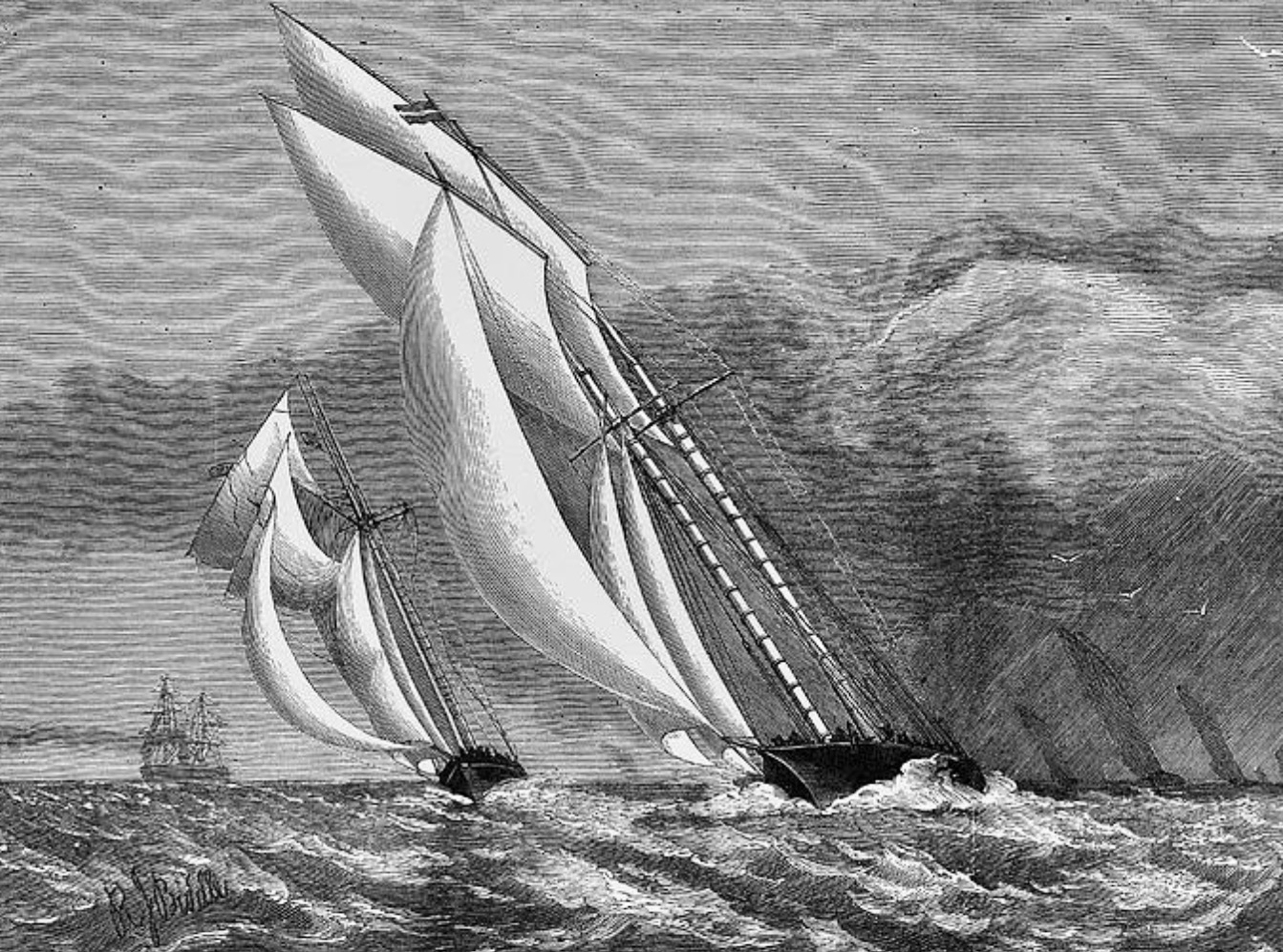
Yacht Enchantress

Lorillard was an avid yachtsman and bought the sloop Eva in 1865. He joined the New York Yacht Club in 1866. He then bought the yacht Magic and won the Regatta at the New York Yacht Club in 1866. He built the Challenge, which sank in a storm in the Bahamas. He built and launched the schooner Meteor in 1869 and took her to the Mediterranean. In 1871, he owned the yacht Enchantress that was designed by Robert Fish. He sold the Enchantress and gave up yachting in 1872 to pursue horse racing.

== Thoroughbred horse racing ==
George Lorillard, like his brother Pierre, was a prominent racehorse owner in New York, New Jersey and Maryland. At his Long Island estate, he built a large stable and training track. Lorillard arranged to take in boys from the New York House of Refuge, who were given stable work and educated in a specially built schoolroom. The boys learned to ride horses and after a five-year apprenticeship were given an opportunity to become a professional jockey. Notable among them was Tom Costello, who won numerous important races, including three American Classics.

George Lorillard's racing stable was handled firstly by trainer Wyndham Walden followed by John Alcock. Notably, Lorillard and Walden won the Preakness Stakes a record five straight years between 1878 and 1882; the Belmont Stakes in 1878, 1880, and 1881; and the Travers Stakes in 1878 and 1880. Among George Lorillard's best horses were Saunterer, Spinaway, Vanguard, Grenada, Tom Ochiltree, and Duke of Magenta.

In 1878, George Lorillard headed a group of investors which included David D. Withers and Gordon Bennett, Jr., who bought Monmouth Park Racetrack. Under Lorillard's management, they built a new racing facility on 660 acres (2.7 km^{2}) of land with the then-largest grandstand in the United States. Opened on July 4, 1890, the track flourished and became known as the "Newmarket of America."

== Personal life ==
In 1882, George Lorillard was married to Marie Louise La Farge (1845–1899), the sister of artist John La Farge, and the aunt of Christopher Grant La Farge. Marie was the former wife of Edward Whyte, whom she divorced before marrying Lorillard.

== Death ==
George Lorillard died in Nice, France in 1886, aged 42. His funeral was held in Grace Church in New York City, on April 17.

After his death, Lorillard's widow married in 1889 the Spanish-Mexican Count de Ágreda, becoming Countess de Ágreda. After the Count's death, she married Leopold Morse (son of Leopold Morse), who changed his name to Leopold Morse de Ágreda.

=== Legacy ===
Lorillard owned a mansion on an estate of 800 acres (3.2 km^{2}) on Long Island, located north of the Montauk Highway on the west bank of the Connetquot River. In 1884, he sold much of this estate to William Bayard Cutting, who built a notable house, Westbrook, on the land. Lorillard also maintained a winter home in St. Augustine, Florida.

Lorillard Avenue in The Bronx is named for him and his brother Pierre.

== Bibliography ==
- Reeves, Richard Stone, and Ashforth, David. Crown Jewels of Thoroughbred Racing (1997) Eclipse Press ISBN 978-0-939049-90-5
