= Middleburg, Carroll County, Maryland =

Unincorporated community in Maryland, U.S.

Coordinates: 39°35′38″N 77°12′46″W

Middleburg is an unincorporated community in Carroll County, Maryland, United States.
