= Endurance by Right =

American-bred Thoroughbred racehorse

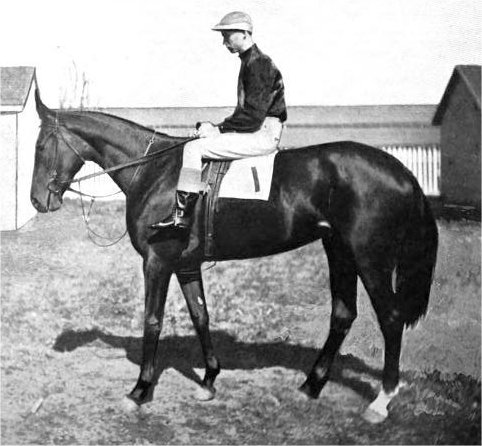
- 1901 photograph by L. A. Berte.
- Sire: Inspector B
- Grandsire: Enquirer
- Dam: Early Morn
- Damsire: Silvester
- Sex: Mare
- Foaled: 1899
- Country: United States
- Color: Bay
- Breeder: William Hicks Jackson
- Owner: 1) Milton Young; 2) William S. Barnes; 3) John W. Schorr; 4) William Collins Whitney; 5) Harry Payne Whitney
- Trainer: Lem Mathers
- Record: 18: 16 - 0 - 2
- Earnings: US$ 27,015

Major wins
- Champagne Stakes (1901); Great Eastern Handicap (1901); Lassie Stakes (1901); Holly Handicap (1901); Clipsetta Stakes (1901); Willow Handicap (1901); Lakeside Stakes (1901); Petite Stakes (1901)

Awards
- American Champion Two-Year-Old Filly (1901)

Endurance by Right (1899–1908) was an American Thoroughbred racehorse that was the top money-winning two-year-old filly of 1901.

== Pedigree ==
Endurance by Right was sired by Inspector B, the 1886 Belmont Stakes winner, out of the imported British mare Early Morn. Early Morn was bought by Milton Young, owner of McGrathiana Stud, in December 1898 while in foal with Endurance by Right. The filly was foaled in spring 1899 at McGrathiana and was put up for sale at the 1900 Woodward and Shanklin auction in Lexington. She was bought for $250 by William S. Barnes, who sent her to Memphis in early 1901 to be trained. Her early efforts showed potential and John Schorr offered to buy her outright from Barnes for $1,200. However, Barnes wanted to retain breeding rights and sold Schorr her racing "abilities" or ownership of racing profits.

== Racing career ==
For Schorr, she won 15 out of 17 starts, earning $22,640, and would be recognized as the American Champion Two-Year-Old Filly of 1901 by The Blood-Horse magazine's National Champion review. She was never beaten in a race by females and her only major stakes loss was a third-place finish in the Flatbush Stakes to the colt Nasturtium. On October 10, 1901, she was sold to William C. Whitney for a reported $40,000. Endurance won the 1901 Champagne Stakes for Whitney, but did not race as a three-year-old in 1902 due to perceived illness.

== Offspring ==
As a broodmare for Whitney's Brookdale stud farm, she produced four foals:

- The Lame Duck (1904), colt by Hamburg
- Stamina (1905), bay filly by Nasturtium, won 1907 Matron Stakes and 1908 Gazelle Stakes, was the top female in 1907 and 1908.
- Right Guard (1906), bay gelding by Hamburg
- Hardyburg (1908), bay gelding by Hamburg. He was exported to England and raced there until 1917.

Endurance by Right died on May 15, 1908, while giving birth to her last foal, a colt by Hamburg. The orphan colt did survive and was raised by a surrogate mother, the 1905 Belmont Stakes winner Tanya.
