= John W. Rogers (horse trainer) =

American Thoroughbred horse trainer

Personal information
- Born: 1852 New Orleans, Louisiana
- Died: February 25, 1908 (aged 55–56) Aiken, South Carolina
- Resting place: Kensico Cemetery Valhalla, New York
- Occupation: Trainer

Horse racing career
- Sport: Horse racing

Major racing wins
- American Derby (1884); Distillers Stakes (1884, 1885); Excelsior Stakes (1884, 1885); Champion Stakes (1885); Suburban Handicap (1886, 1898); Monmouth Cup (1887); Ocean Stakes (1887); Foam Stakes (1888); Dolphin Stakes (1889); Reapers Stakes (1889, 1894); Second Special Stakes (1889, 1892, 1894, 1895); First Special Stakes (1892); Thistle Stakes (1892); Twin City Handicap (1892); Spindrift Stakes (1892, 1893); Champagne Stakes (1893, 1898, 1901, 1903, 1905); Lawrence Realization Stakes (1893, 1907); Mermaid Stakes (1893, 1902, 1906); Manhattan Handicap (1894, 1907); Omnium Handicap (1895, 1907); Oriental Handicap (1895); Withers Stakes (1895, 1900); Autumn Stakes (1896, 1905, 1907); Long Island Handicap (1896); Grand Union Hotel Stakes (1897, 1901, 1905); June Stakes (1900); Advance Stakes (1901, 1904); Alabama Stakes (1901); Flatbush Stakes (1901); Hunter Handicap (1901); Saratoga Special Stakes (1901); Brookdale Handicap (1902); Gazelle Stakes (1902); Ladies Stakes (1902, 1903, 1906); Broadway Stakes (1903); Brooklyn Handicap (1903); Matron Stakes (1903, 1904, 1905, 1907); Metropolitan Handicap (1903); Belmont Futurity Stakes (1904); Great Filly Stakes (1901, 1904, 1906); Hopeful Stakes (1904); Municipal Handicap (1904); National Stallion Stakes (1904); Produce Stakes (Fillies division) (1904, 1907); Spinaway Stakes (1904); White Plains Handicap (1904); Brighton Handicap (1905); Flash Stakes (1905); Great American Stakes (1905); Great Eastern Handicap (1905); Nursery Handicap (1901, 1905); Rancho Del Paso Stakes (1905); United States Hotel Stakes (1905); Brighton Oaks (1906); Carlton Stakes (1906); Jerome Stakes (1906, 1907); Double Event Stakes (1907); Aqueduct Handicap (1907); Oakdale Handicap (1907) American Classics wins: Preakness Stakes (1889); Belmont Stakes (1905, 1906)

Honors
- United States' National Museum of Racing and Hall of Fame (1955)

Significant horses
- Artful, Buddhist, Burgomaster, Blue Girl, Clifford, Freeland, Gunfire, Irish Lad, Lamplighter, Modesty, Nasturtium, Perverse, Royal Tourist, Stamina, Tanya, Troubadour

John W. Rogers (1852 - February 25, 1908) was one of the preeminent trainers in Thoroughbred racing of his era who trained eleven National Champion horses that earned thirteen National Championships. John Rogers was part of the 1955 inaugural class inducted into the United States' National Museum of Racing and Hall of Fame.

The early success of Rogers led to him being sought after by some of the best racing stables in the country. In addition to horses he owned and raced for himself or with a partner, the prominent owners he trained for included Samuel S. Brown, Edward C. Corrigan, William C. Whitney and his son, Harry Payne Whitney.

Year	Horse	Championship
1885	Freeland	American Champion Handicap Male Horse
1886	Troubadour	Champion Handicap Male Horse
1893	Clifford	American Champion Three-Year-Old Male Horse
1901	Blue Girl	American Champion Two-Year-Old Filly
1901	Nasturtium	American Champion Two-Year-Old Male Horse
1903	Gunfire	American Champion Handicap Mare
1904	Artful	American Co-Champion Two-year-old Filly
1904	Tanya	American Co-Champion Two-year-old Filly
1905	Artful	American Co-Champion Three-year-old Filly
1905	Tanya	American Champion Three-year-old Filly
1905	Perverse	American Champion Two-year-old Filly
1906	Burgomaster	American Horse of the Year
1907	Stamina	American Champion Two-year-old Filly
