= 1893 Kentucky Derby =

Horse race

19th Kentucky Derby
- Kentucky Derby
- Grade I stakes race
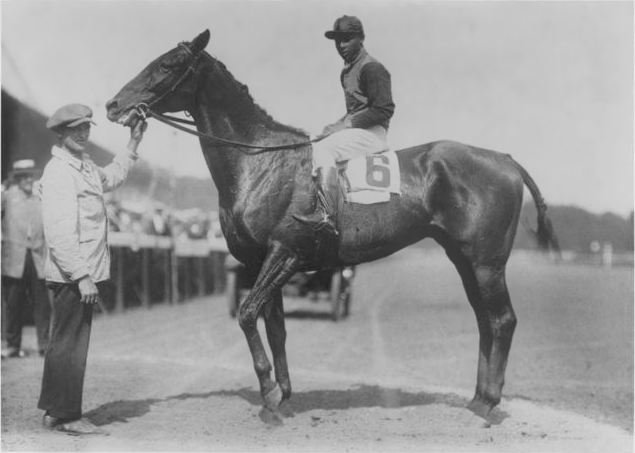
- Azra, winner of the 1892 Kentucky Derby
- Location: Churchill Downs
- Date: May 10, 1893
- Winning horse: Lookout
- Jockey: Eddie Kunze
- Trainer: William McDaniel
- Owner: Cushing & Orth
- Surface: Dirt

The 1893 Kentucky Derby was the 19th running of the Kentucky Derby. The race took place on May 10, 1893.

== Full results ==
Finished	Post	Horse	Jockey	Trainer	Owner	Time / behind
1st	2	Lookout	Eddie Kunze	William McDaniel	John E. Cushing & John W. Orth	2:39.25
2nd	6	Plutus	Alonzo Clayton		Bashford Manor Stable	4
3rd	1	Boundless	Robert "Tiny" Williams	William McDaniel	John E. Cushing & John W. Orth	2
4th	5	Buck McCann	Charles A. Thorpe	Robert Tucker	Scoggan Brothers	4
5th	7	Mirage	Isaac Murphy		James E. Pepper	
6th	8	Linger	Eddie Flynn		C. Elmer Railey	

- Winning breeder: Scoggan Brothers (KY)

== Payout ==
- The winner received a purse of $3,840.
- Second place received $400.
- Third place received $150.
