= Monmouth Cup (1870) =

- Class: Discontinued Stakes
- Location: Long Branch Racetrack; Long Branch, New Jersey, United States
- Inaugurated: 1870
- Race type: Thoroughbred – Flat racing
- Website: n/a

Race information
- Distance: Various
- Surface: Dirt
- Track: left-handed
- Qualification: Three-years-old & up
- Weight: Assigned

The Monmouth Cup was an American Thoroughbred horse race run annually in July at the Monmouth Park Association's racetrack in Long Branch, New Jersey. First run as part of the racetrack's inaugural season in 1870, the Monmouth Cup was open to horses aged three and older. It was created as a long distance race but the long distance soon declined in popularity and the race was subsequently run at various shorter distances:

- 2 1/2 miles : (1870–1876)
- 2 1/4 miles : (1878–1882)
- 1 3/4 miles : (1887–1890, 1892)
- 1 5/8 miles : (1891) at Jerome Park Racetrack

In 1891, the races at Long Branch had to be shifted to racetracks in New York when government legislation attempted to inhibit parimutuel wagering. The race meetings were split between the Jerome Park Racetrack in Fordham, Bronx and the nearby Morris Park Racecourse at Westchester Village. The Monmouth Park Racing Association closed and the land was sold after its operating license was revoked in 1893 and government legislation was enacted that banned parimutuel wagering.

The final running in 1892 was won in a walkover by Longstreet.

The race should not be confused with the race of the same name, which was originally the Meadowlands Cup but moved to Monmouth Park in 2010.

== Winners ==
- 1892 – Longstreet
- 1891 – Riley
- 1890 – Salvator
- 1889 – Firenze
- 1888 – Firenze
- 1887 – Troubadour
- 1882 – Eole
- 1881 – Monitor
- 1880 – Report
- 1879 – Bramble
- 1878 – Parole
- 1877 – no race
- 1876 – Tom Ochiltree
- 1875 – Aaron Pennington
- 1874 – Tom Bowling
- 1873 – Wanderer
- 1872 – Longfellow
- 1871 – Longfellow
- 1870 – Helmbold
