= American Champion Older Dirt Male Horse =

Award for American racehorses

The title of American Champion Older Dirt Male Horse is an American Thoroughbred horse racing honor awarded annually to a stallion or gelding, four years old and up, for performances on dirt and main track racing surfaces. In 1971, it became part of the Eclipse Awards program as the award for Champion Older Male Horse.

The award originated in 1936 when the Daily Racing Form (DRF) began naming an annual champion. In the same year, the Baltimore-based Turf and Sports Digest magazine instituted a similar award. Starting in 1950, the Thoroughbred Racing Associations (TRA) began naming its own champion. The following list provides the name of the horses chosen by these organizations. Whenever there were different champions named, the horses are listed side-by-side with the one chosen as champion by the Daily Racing Form noted with the letters (DRF), the one chosen by the Thoroughbred Racing Associations by the letters (TRA) and the one chosen by Turf and Sports Digest by the letters (TSD). Prior to 1971 this award was referred to as "Champion Handicap Male Horse". The Daily Racing Form version was open to any horse, three years old and up and this award was given to some Champions at the age of three, such as Citation, Buckpasser, Damascus and Arts and Letters.

Champions from 1887 through 1935 were selected retrospectively by a panel of experts as published by The Blood-Horse magazine.

In 2015, the Daily Racing Form, the Thoroughbred Racing Associations, and the National Turf Writers Association decided that the award would be renamed and awarded to older horses proficient in dirt and main track races.

== Honorees ==
=== Eclipse Award for Champion Older Dirt Male ===
Year	Horse	Age	Trainer	Owner
2025	Forever Young	4	Yoshito Yahagi	Susumu Fujita
2024	National Treasure	4	Bob Baffert	SF Racing, Starlight Racing, Madaket Stables, Robert E. Masterson, Stonestreet Stables, Jay A. Schoenfarber, Waves Edge Capital & Catherine Donovan
2023	Cody's Wish	5	William I. Mott	Godolphin
2022	Flightline	4	John Sadler	Hronis Racing
2021	Knicks Go	5	Brad H. Cox	Korea Racing Authority
2020	Improbable	4	Bob Baffert	WinStar Farm LLC, CHC Inc. and SF Racing LLC
2019	Vino Rosso	4	Todd Pletcher	Repole Stable (Mike Repole) & St. Elias Stable (Vincent Viola)
2018	Accelerate	5	John Sadler	Hronis Racing
2017	Gun Runner	4	Steve Asmussen	Winchell Thoroughbreds & Three Chimneys Farm
2016	California Chrome	5	Art Sherman	California Chrome LLC
2015	Honor Code	4	Claude R. McGaughey III	Lane's End Racing
2014	Main Sequence	5	Graham Motion	Flaxman Holdings
2013	Wise Dan	6	Charles Lopresti	Morton Fink
2012	Wise Dan	5	Charles Lopresti	Morton Fink
2011	Acclamation	5	Donald Warren	Old English Rancho
2010	Blame	4	Albert Stall Jr.	Claiborne Farm
2009	Gio Ponti	4	Christophe Clement	Castleton Lyons
2008	Curlin	4	Steve Asmussen	Stonestreet Stables/Midnight Cry Stables
2007	Lawyer Ron	4	Todd A. Pletcher	Stonewall Farm
2006	Invasor	4	Kiaran McLaughlin	Shadwell Stable
2005	Saint Liam	5	Richard E. Dutrow Jr.	M/M William K. Warren Jr.
2004	Ghostzapper	4	Robert J. Frankel	Frank Stronach
2003	Mineshaft	4	Neil J. Howard	W. S. Farish/W. T. Webber/J. Elkins
2002	Left Bank	5	Todd A. Pletcher	Michael B. Tabor
2001	Tiznow	4	Jay M. Robbins	Cee's Stable
2000	Lemon Drop Kid	4	Scotty Schulhofer	Jeanne G. Vance
1999	Victory Gallop	4	W. Elliott Walden	Prestonwood Farm
1998	Skip Away	5	Sonny Hine	Carolyn Hine
1997	Skip Away	4	Sonny Hine	Carolyn Hine
1996	Cigar	6	William I. Mott	Allen E. Paulson
1995	Cigar	5	William I. Mott	Allen E. Paulson
1994	The Wicked North	5	David Bernstein	Philip & Sophie Hersh Trust
1993	Bertrando	4	Robert J. Frankel	Ed Nahem & Marshall Naify
1992	Pleasant Tap	5	Christopher Speckert	Buckland Farm
1991	Black Tie Affair	5	Ernie T. Poulos	Jeffrey Sullivan
1990	Criminal Type	5	D. Wayne Lukas	Calumet & Jurgen K. Arnemann
1989	Blushing John	4	Richard J. Lundy	Allen E. Paulson
1988	Alysheba	4	Jack Van Berg	Dorothy & Pamela Scharbauer
1987	Ferdinand	4	Charlie Whittingham	Elizabeth A. Keck
1986	Turkoman	4	Gary F. Jones	Corbin J. Robinson
1985	Vanlandingham	4	Claude R. McGaughey III	Loblolly Stable
1984	Slew o' Gold	4	John O. Hertler	Equusequity Stable
1983	Bates Motel	4	John H. M. Gosden	Jacqueline Phillips & Michael Riordan
1982	Lemhi Gold	4	Laz Barrera	Aaron U. Jones
1981	John Henry	6	Ron McAnally	Dotsam Stable
1980	Spectacular Bid	4	Bud Delp	Hawksworth Farm
1979	Affirmed	4	Laz Barrera	Harbor View Farm
1978	Seattle Slew	4	Douglas R. Peterson	K. & M. Taylor/J. & S. Hill
1977	Forego	7	Frank Y. Whiteley Jr.	Lazy F Ranch
1976	Forego	6	Frank Y. Whiteley Jr.	Lazy F Ranch
1975	Forego	5	Frank Y. Whiteley Jr.	Lazy F Ranch
1974	Forego	4	Frank Y. Whiteley Jr.	Lazy F Ranch
1973	Riva Ridge	4	Lucien Laurin	Estate of C. T. Chenery
1972	Autobiography	4	Pancho Martin	Sigmund Sommer
1971	Ack Ack	5	Charlie Whittingham	Buddy Fogelson

=== Daily Racing Form, Turf & Sport Digest and Thoroughbred Racing Association Awards ===
Year	Horse	Age	Trainer	Owner
1970	Fort Marcy (DRF)	6	J. Elliott Burch	Rokeby Stables
1970	Nodouble (TRA)	5	J. Bert Sonnier	Gene Goff
1969	Arts and Letters (DRF)	3	J. Elliott Burch	Rokeby Stables
1969	Nodouble (TRA)	4	J. Bert Sonnier	Gene Goff
1968	Dr. Fager	4	John A. Nerud	William L. McKnight
1967	Damascus (DRF)	3	Frank Y. Whiteley Jr.	Edith W. Bancroft
1967	Buckpasser (TRA) (TSD)	4	Edward A. Neloy	Ogden Phipps
1966	Buckpasser (DRF)	3	Edward A. Neloy	Ogden Phipps
1966	Bold Bidder (TRA)	4	Woody Stephens	John R. Gaines
1965	Roman Brother	4	Burley Parke	Harbor View Farm
1964	Kelso	7	Carl Hanford	Bohemia Stable
1963	Kelso	6	Carl Hanford	Bohemia Stable
1962	Kelso	5	Carl Hanford	Bohemia Stable
1961	Kelso	4	Carl Hanford	Bohemia Stable
1960	Bald Eagle	5	Woody Stephens	Cain Hoy Stable
1959	Sword Dancer (DRF)	3	J. Elliott Burch	Brookmeade Stable
1959	Round Table (TRA)	5	William Molter	Kerr Stable
1958	Round Table	4	William Molter	Kerr Stable
1957	Dedicate	5	G. Carey Winfrey	Jan Winfrey Burke
1956	Swaps	4	Mesh Tenney	Rex C. Ellsworth
1955	High Gun	4	Max Hirsch	King Ranch
1954	Native Dancer	4	William C. Winfrey	Alfred G. Vanderbilt II
1953	Tom Fool	4	Duval A. Headley	Greentree Stables
1952	Crafty Admiral	4	Robert B. Odom	Charfran Stable
1951	Hill Prince (DRF)	4	Casey Hayes	Christopher Chenery
1951	Citation (TSD)	6	Ben A. Jones	Calumet Farm
1950	Noor	5	Burley Parke	Charles S. Howard

=== Daily Racing Form and Turf & Sport Digest Awards ===
Year	Horse	Age	Trainer	Owner
1949	Coaltown	4	Ben A. Jones	Calumet Farm
1948	Citation (DRF)	3	Ben A. Jones	Calumet Farm
1948	Shannon II (TSD)	7	William Molter	Neil S. McCarthy
1947	Armed	6	Ben A. Jones	Calumet Farm
1946	Armed	5	Ben A. Jones	Calumet Farm
1945	Stymie	4	Hirsch Jacobs	Ethel D. Jacobs
1944	Devil Diver	5	John M. Gaver Sr.	Helen Hay Whitney
1943	Market Wise (TSD)	5	George W. Carroll	Louis Tufano
1943	Devil Diver (DRF)	4	John M. Gaver Sr.	Helen Hay Whitney
1942	Whirlaway	4	Ben A. Jones	Calumet Farm
1941	Mioland (DRF)	4	Tom Smith	Charles S. Howard
1941	Big Pebble (TSD)	5	William B. Finnegan	Edward S. Moore
1940	Challedon	4	Louis J. Schaefer	William L. Brann
1939	Kayak II	4	Horatio Luro	Charles S. Howard
1938	Seabiscuit	5	Tom Smith	Charles S. Howard
1937	Seabiscuit	4	Tom Smith	Charles S. Howard
1936	Discovery	5	Bud Stotler	Alfred G. Vanderbilt II

=== The Blood-Horse retrospective champions ===
Year	Horse	Age	Trainer	Owner
1935	Discovery	4	Bud Stotler	Alfred G. Vanderbilt II
1934	Equipose	6	Thomas J. Healey	C. V. Whitney
1933	Equipose	5	Thomas J. Healey	C. V. Whitney
1932	Equipose	4	Thomas J. Healey	C. V. Whitney
1931	Sun Beau	6	Andy Schuttinger	Willis Sharpe Kilmer
1930	Sun Beau	5	William A. Crawford	Willis Sharpe Kilmer
1930	Blue Larkspur	4	Herbert J. Thompson	Edward R. Bradley
1929	Sun Beau	4	Andrew G. Blakely	Willis Sharpe Kilmer
1929	Diavolo	4	James E. Fitzsimmons	Wheatley Stable
1928	Mike Hall	4	Walter W. Taylor	Hal Price Headley
1927	Chance Play	4	John I. Smith	Log Cabin Stable
1926	Sarazen	5	Max Hirsch	Virginia Fair Vanderbilt
1925	Sarazen	4	Max Hirsch	Virginia Fair Vanderbilt
1924	Epinard	4	H. Eugene Leigh	Pierre Wertheimer
1923	Grey Lag	5	Sam Hildreth	Harry F. Sinclair
1922	Exterminator	7	Eugene Wayland	Willis Sharpe Kilmer
1922	Grey Lag	4	Sam Hildreth	Harry F. Sinclair
1921	Exterminator	6	Willie Knapp	Willis Sharpe Kilmer
1921	Mad Hatter	5	Sam Hildreth	Harry F. Sinclair
1920	Exterminator	5	Henry McDaniel	Willis Sharpe Kilmer
1919	Cudgel	5	H. Guy Bedwell	J. K. L. Ross
1919	Sun Briar	4	Henry McDaniel	Willis Sharpe Kilmer
1918	Cudgel	4	H. Guy Bedwell	J. K. L. Ross
1917	Old Rosebud	6	Frank D. Weir	F. D. Weir & Hamilton Applegate
1916	Roamer	5	A. J. Goldsborough	Andrew Miller
1916	Short Grass	8	John J. Flannigan	Emil Herz
1915	Roamer	4	A. J. Goldsborough	Andrew Miller
1914	Great Britain	4	John Walters	George M. Hendrie
1914	Borrow	6	James G. Rowe Sr.	Harry Payne Whitney
1913	Whisk Broom II	6	James G. Rowe Sr.	Harry Payne Whitney
1912	Star Charter	4	John F. Schorr	John W. Schorr
1911	Plate Glass	5	Jake Byer	Philip S. P. Randolph
1910	Fitz Herbert	4	Sam Hildreth	Charles Kohler
1910	Ballot	6	James G. Rowe Sr.	James R. Keene
1909	King James	4	Sam Hildreth	Sam Hildreth
1908	Ballot	4	James G. Rowe Sr.	James R. Keene
1907	Nealon	4	Frank M. Taylor	Charles E. Durnell
1906	Go Between	5	William Shields	Edward R. Thomas
1905	Ort Wells	4	Enoch Wishard	John A. Drake
1905	Delhi	4	James G. Rowe Sr.	James R. Keene
1904	Hermis	5	William Shields	Edward R. Thomas
1903	Hermis	4	William Shields	Edward R. Thomas
1903	Waterboy	4	A. Jack Joyner	James Ben Ali Haggin
1902	Gold Heels	4	Matthew M. Allen	Fred C. McLewee & Diamond Jim Brady
1901	Banastar	6	Charles F. Hill	Clarence H. Mackay
1900	Kinley Mack	4	Peter Wimmer	Augustus Eastin & Samuel E. Larabie
1899	Voter	5	James G. Rowe Sr.	James R. Keene
1898	Ornament	4	Charles T. Patterson	H. P. Headley & W. P. Norton
1897	Ben Brush	4	Hardy Campbell Jr.	Michael F. Dwyer
1896	Henry of Navarre	5	John J. Hyland	August Belmont Jr.
1895	Henry of Navarre	4	John J. Hyland	August Belmont Jr.
1894	Clifford	4	H. Eugene Leigh	H. Eugene Leigh & Robert L. Rose
1894	Ramapo	4	John J. Hyland	David Gideon & John Daly
1893	Lamplighter	4	John Huggins	Pierre Lorillard IV
1893	Tammany	4	Matthew Byrnes	Marcus Daly
1892	Longstreet	6	Hardy Campbell Jr.	Michael F. Dwyer
1891	Longstreet	5	Hardy Campbell Jr.	Michael F. Dwyer
1890	Salvator	4	Matthew Byrnes	James Ben Ali Haggin
1890	Kingston	6	Hardy Campbell Jr.	Michael F. Dwyer
1889	The Bard	6	John Huggins	Alexander Cassatt
1889	Kingston	5	Frank McCabe	Dwyer Brothers Stable
1888	none selected	n/a	n/a	
1887	Troubadour	5	John W. Rogers	Samuel S. Brown

=== Thoroughbred Heritage retrospective champions ===
Year	Horse	Age	Trainer	Owner
1886	Troubadour	4	John W. Rogers	Samuel S. Brown
1885	Freeland	6	John W. Rogers	Edward Corrigan
1884	General Monroe	6	Walter C. Rollins	E. J. McElmeel
1884	Drake Carter	4	Green B. Morris	Morris & Patton
1883	Eole	5	Evert V. Snedecker	Frederick Gebhard
1882	Hindoo	4	James G. Rowe Sr.	Dwyer Brothers Stable
1881	Glenmore	6	William Jennings Sr.	William Jennings Sr.
1881	Checkmate	6	not found	James T. Williams
1880	Monitor	4	R. Wyndham Walden	George L. Lorillard
1879	Bramble	4	James G. Rowe Sr.	Dwyer Brothers Stable
1878	Parole	5	William Brown	Pierre Lorillard IV
1877	Ten Broeck	5	Harry Colston	Frank B. Harper
1877	Parole	4	William Brown	Pierre Lorillard IV
1876	Tom Ochiltree	4	R. Wyndham Walden	George L. Lorillard
1876	Ten Broeck	4	Harry Colston	Frank B. Harper
1875	Preakness	5	Charles S. Littlefield	Milton H. Sanford
1875	Springbok	5	Col. David McDaniel	Col. David McDaniel
1874	Springbok	4	Col. David McDaniel	Col. David McDaniel
