= Blue Girl =

American-bred Thoroughbred racehorse

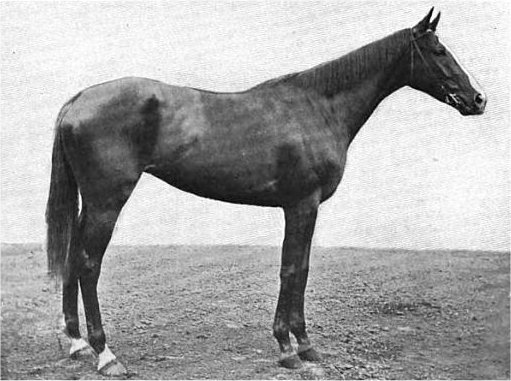
- Blue Girl in 1901.
- Sire: Sir Dixon
- Grandsire: Billet
- Dam: Bonnie Blue
- Damsire: Hindoo
- Sex: Mare
- Foaled: 1899
- Country: United States
- Color: Chestnut
- Breeder: Clay & Woodford partnership
- Owner: 1) John E. Madden; 2) William Collins Whitney; 3) Harry Payne Whitney
- Trainer: 1) John E. Madden; 2) John W. Rogers
- Record: 12: 7-3-1
- Earnings: US$ 68,950

Major wins
- Great American Stakes (1901); Juvenile Stakes (1901); Eclipse Stakes (1901); Great Trial Stakes (1901); Great Filly Stakes (1901); Ladies Handicap (1902); Gazelle Handicap (1902)

Awards
- American Co-Champion Two-Year-Old Female (1901); American Champion Three-Year-Old Female (1902)
- Last updated on August 10, 2024

Blue Girl (1899–1919) was an American Thoroughbred racemare that was the National Champion 2- and 3-year-old female in 1901 and 1902, respectively.

== Pedigree ==
Blue Girl was bred in Kentucky by the Ezekiel Clay & Catesby Woodford breeding partnership and foaled at Clay's Runnymeade Stud. She was sired by Sir Dixon, the 1888 Belmont Stakes winner, and out of the mare Bonnie Blue. Bonnie Blue was sired by the influential American sire Hindoo that also produced the semi-successful stallion Blues. Blue Girl was sold as a 2-year-old in 1901 to John E. Madden, the owner of Hamburg Place stud farm at Lexington, Kentucky.

== Racing career ==
Blue Girl was trained by John Madden as a two-year-old and won the Juvenile Stakes, Eclipse, Great Trial, and Great American Stakes for Madden, netting $38,230 in purse money. She was bought by William Collins Whitney in late 1901 who turned her over to future U.S. Hall of Fame trainer John Rogers for whom she won the Great Filly Stakes earning $23,975. As a 3-year-old, Blue Girl won the Gazelle and Ladies Handicap. She started in the Flying Handicap, run at Sheepshead Bay, but she became lame during the race. This was her last race, and overall Blue Girl started 12 times, winning 7.

== Offspring ==
Blue Girl was retired in 1903 and was sent to Whitney's Brookdale Stud farm. She was sold to Frederick Johnson (as representative for Harry Payne Whitney) for $10,000 in October 1904 after William Whitney's death. Blue Girl was sent to Britain in 1912, but returned to the United States in 1915 due to anti-American Thoroughbred sentiment and the passage of the Jersey Act. She produced thirteen foals, but none were as successful as Blue Girl. Her offspring include:

- Tammany Hall, chestnut gelding by Meddler (1904)
- Blue Grass, chestnut filly by Hamburg (1906)
- Dalenburg, chestnut colt by Hamburg (1907) (exported to Britain)
- Bay filly by Hamburg (1908)
- Eton Blue, bay filly by Hamburg (1909)
- Brush By, colt by Broomstick (1910)
- Delft, bay filly by Burgomaster (1911, died 1926), granddam of 1926 2-year-old champion Scapa Flow
- Blume (GB), chestnut filly by Broomstick (1913)
- Bit of Blue (GB), chestnut filly by Lemberg (1914)
- Cobalt, bay gelding by Willonyx (1915)
- Blue Laddie, bay gelding by Cylgad (1916)
- Sky Blue, chestnut filly by All Gold (1918)
- Chestnut colt by Pennant (1919, died 1920)

Blue Girl died in 1919 at the Brookdale Stud.
