= Rancho Del Paso Stakes =

- Class: Discontinued stakes
- Location: Morris Park Racecourse (1898-1904); Westchester County, New York, United States Belmont Park (1905-1908); Elmont, New York; United States
- Inaugurated: 1898
- Race type: Thoroughbred - Flat racing

Race information
- Distance: 6 furlongs
- Surface: Dirt
- Track: left-handed
- Qualification: Two-year-olds

The Rancho Del Paso Stakes was an American Thoroughbred horse race run between 1898 and 1908. Inaugurated at Morris Park Racecourse in Westchester County, New York as a race for two-year-old horse of either sex, it was contested on dirt over a distance of 6 furlongs. When the Morris Park track was closed permanently after the 1904 racing season, the event was picked up by the newly constructed Belmont Park.

== Historical notes ==
The race was named in honor of Rancho Del Paso, the great California breeding farm of James B. A. Haggin. The first edition of the Rancho Del Paso Stakes was held on October 8, 1898 and was won by the Canadian owned colt, Martimas. Earlier in the year, at New York's Sheepshead Bay Race Track Martimas had won the Futurity Stakes, the richest and most prestigious race in the country. However, in a December 22, 1916 retrospective referencing of The Canadian Sportsman magazine, the Daily Racing Form reported that "His greatest performance as a two-year-old was probably in the Rancho Del Paso Stakes in which he ran three-quarters of a mile in the mud the heavy weight up, in 1:12 and a fraction."

The first winner of the Rancho Del Paso Stakes after moving to Belmont Park in 1905 was the filly Brookdale Nymph owned by Harry Payne Whitney. Ridden by Willie Shaw, she won by two and a half lengths while setting a new track record with a time of 1:10 4/5.

What would turn out to be the final running of the Rancho Del Paso Stakes took place on October 12, 1908. Only two horses started in a race offering a purse that had been cut by more than 80 percent from the previous year's offering. Frederick Lewisohn's Etherial won over Newcastle Stable's Wise Mason.

== The Demise of the Rancho Del Paso Stakes ==
The 1908 passage of the Hart-Agnew anti-betting legislation by the New York Legislature under Republican Governor Charles Evans Hughes led to a state-wide shutdown of racing in 1911 and 1912. A February 21, 1913 ruling by the New York Supreme Court, Appellate Division saw horse racing return in 1913. However, the Rancho Del Paso Stakes was never returned to the stakes schedule.

== Records ==
Speed record:

- 1:09.75 @ 6 furlongs: Grenada (1903) & Bedouin (1904)

Most wins by a jockey:

- 3 - Willie Shaw (1901, 1904, 1905)

Most wins by a trainer:

- 2 - John J. Hyland (1899, 1908)

Most wins by an owner:

- No owner won this race more than once.

== Winners ==
Year	Winner	Age	Jockey	Trainer	Owner	Dist. (furlongs)	Time	Win$
At Belmont Park
1908	Etherial	2	Dalton McCarthy	John J. Hyland	Elkwood Park Stable (Frederick Lewisohn)	6 f	1:12.80	$490
1907	Uncle	2	Walter Miller	Sam Hildreth	Sam Hildreth	6 f	1:13.00	$2,930
1906	Tourenne	2	Henry Horner	Raleigh Colston Jr.	Phil T. Chinn & Fred A. Forsythe	6 f	1:10.20	$3,020
1905	Brookdale Nymph	2	Willie Shaw	John W. Rogers	Harry Payne Whitney	6 f	1:10.80	$2,700
At Morris Park
1904	Bedouin	2	Willie Shaw	John Huggins	Edward W. Jewett	6 f	1:09.75	$2,000
1903	Grenada	2	Frank O'Neill	A. Jack Joyner	Sydney Paget	6 f	1:09.75	$2,310
1902	Cinquevalli	2	Winfield O'Connor	Thomas J. Healey	Andrew Miller	6 f	1:11.25	$2,570
1901	Whiskey King	2	Willie Shaw	Crit Davis	Pepper Stables (Col. James E. Pepper)	6 f	1:10.75	$1,455
1900	Silverdale	2	Milton Henry	John F. Schorr	John F. Schorr	6 f	1:10.75	$1,250
1899	Brigadier	2	Winfield O'Connor	John J. Hyland	August Belmont Jr.	6 f	1:13.00	$1,520
1898	Martimas	2	Fred Taral	Edward Whyte	William M. Hendrie	6 f	1:13.25	$1,565
