= Great Filly Stakes =

Defunct thoroughbred horse race

- Class: Discontinued
- Location: Sheepshead Bay Race Track; Brooklyn, New York, United States
- Inaugurated: 1901–1909
- Race type: Thoroughbred – Flat racing

Race information
- Distance: 6 furlongs
- Surface: Dirt
- Track: left-handed
- Qualification: Two-year-old fillies
- Purse: $10,000

The Great Filly Stakes is a discontinued Thoroughbred horse race run from 1901 through 1909 that began as one of the richest events for two-year-old fillies in the United States with $23,975 going to the winner. It was run on dirt over a distance of six furlongs at the Sheepshead Bay Race Track in Sheepshead Bay, Brooklyn, New York.

== Top class runners ==
Although prize money declined from its inaugural high, the Great Filly Stakes still offered a significant purse throughout its tenure. Run in September, the race helped establish the year's Champion two-year-old filly and those expected to be top-level performers in their upcoming three-year-old campaigns. As such, in the nine years the race was run it produced three future Hall of Fame fillies, Maskette, Artful and Beldame, all of which were Champions including an American Horse of the Year honoree. In addition, Blue Girl would be named a Champion at both age two and three, and although not a Champion, Running Water had a redoubtable career in which she won top races against the best competition including beating male opponents on a regular basis.

== Hart–Agnew Law ==
During the first decade of the 1900s, horse racing in New York state had been under increasing attack by politicians and activists who opposed wagering on races. The Republican controlled New York Legislature under Governor Charles Evans Hughes had already passed the Hart–Agnew anti-betting legislation on June 11 of that year. As a result, owners of Sheepshead Bay Race Track, and other racing facilities in New York State, struggled to stay in business without income from wagering. Racetrack operators had no choice but to make cuts to the purse money being paid out which by 1909 saw many stakes races offering drastically reduced purses.

== The end of a race and a racetrack ==
After 1908, the financial situation had deteriorated to the point where it left the future of the Sheepshead Bay track in doubt and its owners attempted to make a deal with the Saratoga Association to host its Great Filly Stakes for 1910. Unsuccessful in their effort, the final Great Filly Stakes took place on September 8, 1909 and was won by Schoolmarm.

Further restrictive legislation was passed by the New York State Legislature in 1910 which deepened the financial crisis for track operators and led to a complete shutdown of racing across the state during 1911 and 1912. When a February 1913 Court ruling saw racing return that year it was too late for any revival of the Great Filly Stakes as the Sheepshead Bay horse racing facility never reopened for horse racing.

== Records ==
Speed record:

- 1:11 3/5 – Artful (1904)

Most wins by a jockey:

- 2 – Tommy Burns (1902, 1905)

Most wins by a trainer:

- 3 – John W. Rogers (1901, 1904, 1906)

Most wins by an owner:

- 2 – William C. Whitney (1901, 1902)
- 2 – Harry P. Whitney (1904, 1906)

== Winners ==
Year	Winner	Age	Jockey	Trainer	Owner	Dist. (Furlongs)	Time	Win$
1909	Schoolmarm	2	James Butwell	A. J. Goldsborough	Jack A. Bennett	6 F	1:14.00	$7,175
1908	Maskette	2	Joe Notter	James G. Rowe Sr.	James R. Keene	6 F	1:12.60	$10,515
1907	Keep Moving	2	Eddie Dugan	John E. Madden	Francis R. Hitchcock	6 F	1:15.00	$11,655
1906	Killaloe	2	Charles Koerner	John W. Rogers	Harry P. Whitney	6 F	1:13.40	$9,365
1905	Running Water	2	Tommy Burns	Woodford Clay	Woodford Clay	6 F	1:15.40	$9,055
1904	Artful	2	Gene Hildebrand	John W. Rogers	Harry P. Whitney	6 F	1:11.60	$10,245
1903	Beldame	2	John Bullman	Fred Burlew	Newton Bennington	6 F	1:12.80	$15,300
1902	Girdle	2	Tommy Burns	John E. Madden	William C. Whitney	6 F	1:12.60	$12,740
1901	Blue Girl	2	Willie Shaw	John W. Rogers	William C. Whitney	6 F	1:14.80	$23,975
