= Flatbush Stakes =

- Class: Discontinued stakes
- Location: Sheepshead Bay Race Track, Sheepshead Bay, Brooklyn, New York
- Inaugurated: 1884–1909
- Race type: Thoroughbred – Flat racing

Race information
- Distance: 7 furlongs
- Track: Dirt, left-handed
- Qualification: Two-years-old

The Flatbush Stakes was an American Thoroughbred horse race run annually at Sheepshead Bay Race Track in Sheepshead Bay, Brooklyn, New York. Held in September, it was an important event for two-year-olds of either sex. The race was run on dirt over a distance of seven furlongs and was generally the longest distance to that point for the participants who were in their first year of racing.

The inaugural running in 1884 was won by the filly Wanda who was selected through a present-day review process by Thoroughbred Heritage as the 1884 American Champion Two-Year-Old Female The final running in 1909 was won by the colt Waldo who would earn annual Co-Champion honors as one of the 1887–1935 Champions selected retrospectively by a panel of experts as published by the widely respected The Blood-Horse magazine.

== Champions who won the Flatbush Stakes ==
1. Lady Violet
2. Requital
3. Ornament
4. Nasturtium
5. Irish Lad
6. Highball
7. Colin (HoF)
8. Sir Martin
9. Waldo

== Demise of the Flatbush Stakes ==
On June 11, 1908, the Republican controlled New York Legislature under Governor Charles Evans Hughes passed the Hart–Agnew anti-betting legislation with penalties allowing for fines and up to a year in prison. The owners of Sheepshead Bay Race Track, and other racing facilities in New York State, struggled to stay in business without betting. Racetrack operators had no choice but to drastically reduce the purse money being paid out which by 1909 saw the Flatbush Stakes offering a purse that was nearly a tenth of what it had been in earlier years. Further restrictive legislation was passed by the New York Legislature in 1910 which deepened the financial crisis for track operators and led to a complete shut down of racing across the state during 1911 and 1912. When a Court ruling saw racing return in 1913 it was too late for the Sheepshead Bay horse racing facility and it never reopened.

== Records ==
Speed record:

- 1:24.80 – Colin (1907)

Most wins by a jockey:

- 2 – Tod Sloan (1897, 1900)
- 2 – Anthony Hamilton (1889, 1890)
- 2 – Samuel Doggett (1893, 1894)
- 2 – Nash Turner (1901, 1902)

Most wins by a trainer:

- 3 – Matthew Byrnes (1884, 1888, 1893)
- 3 – A. Jack Joyner (1892, 1898, 1904)
- 3 – Bud May (1903, 1905, 1906)

Most wins by an owner:

- 3 – William C. Whitney (1900, 1901, 1902)

== Winners ==
Year	Winner	Age	Jockey	Trainer	Owner	Dist. (F)	Time	Win US$
1909	Waldo	2	Charles Grand	Raleigh Colston Jr.	Charles L. Harrison	7 F	1:26.20	$1,425
1908	Sir Martin	2	Cal Shilling	John E. Madden	John E. Madden	7 F	1:25.40	$11,100
1907	Colin	2	Walter Miller	James G. Rowe Sr.	James R. Keene	7 F	1:24.80	$8,350
1906	De Mund	2	Herman Radtke	John W. May	Paul J. Rainey	7 F	1:26.20	$8,350
1905	Yankee Consul	2	Jack Martin	John W. May	Tippah Farms Stable	7 F	1:26.00	$8,350
1904	Tradition	2	Lucien Lyne	A. Jack Joyner	Sydney Paget	7 F	1:25.20	$8,350
1903	Highball	2	Grover Fuller	John W. May	Walter M. Shiftel	7 F	1:25.60	$8,350
1902	Irish Lad	2	Nash Turner	John W. Rogers	W. C. Whitney & H. B. Duryea	7 F	1:26.00	$3,850
1901	Nasturtium	2	Nash Turner	John W. Rogers	William C. Whitney	7 F	1:25.60	$3,850
1900	Ballyhoo Bey	2	Tod Sloan	John E. Madden	William C. Whitney	7 F	1:26.00	$3,850
1899	Lieut. Gibson	2	Frank O'Leary	Charles H. Hughes	Charles Head Smith	7 F	1:30.00	$3,475
1898	Autumn †	2	Danny Maher	A. Jack Joyner	A. Jack Joyner	7 F	1:28.00	$2,400
1897	Previous	2	Tod Sloan	Hardy Campbell Jr.	Michael F. Dwyer	7 F	1:28.40	$2,350
1896	Ornament	2	Alonzo Clayton	Charles T. Patterson	Charles T. Patterson	7 F	1:27.20	$2,350
1895	Requital	2	Henry Griffin	John Hyland	David Gideon	7 F	1:26.00	$2,400
1894	Lissak	2	Samuel Doggett	Raleigh Colston Jr.	Jack P. Chinn	7 F	1:29.00	$3,500
1893	Senator Grady	2	Samuel Doggett	Matthew Byrnes	Marcus Daly	7 F	1:29.20	$3,350
1892	Lady Violet	2	Willie Simms	A. Jack Joyner	Blemton Stable	7 F	1:28.60	$3,800
1891	Merry Monarch	2	Marty Bergen	John Hyland	David Gideon	7 F	1:29.40	$4,450
1890	Potomac	2	Anthony Hamilton	James G. Rowe Sr.	August Belmont Sr.	7 F	1:29.80	$4,550
1889	Torso	2	Anthony Hamilton	Charles Leighton	William L. Scott	7 F	1:34.00	$6,600
1888	Salvator	2	Shelby Barnes	Matthew Byrnes	James B. A. Haggin	7 F	1:30.80	$5,450
1887	Sir Dixon	2	William J. Fitzpatrick	Green B. Morris	Green B. Morris	7 F	1:29.00	$5,650
1886	King Fox	2	John Spellman	Jim Murphy	James B. A. Haggin	7 F	1:27.75	$3,650
1885	Charity	2	Robert "Tiny" Williams		William L. Scott	7 F	1:31.25	$4,700
1884	Wanda	2	Harris Olney	Matthew Byrnes	Pierre Lorillard IV	7 F	1:31.00	$2,475

- † In 1898, Martimas won but was disqualified.

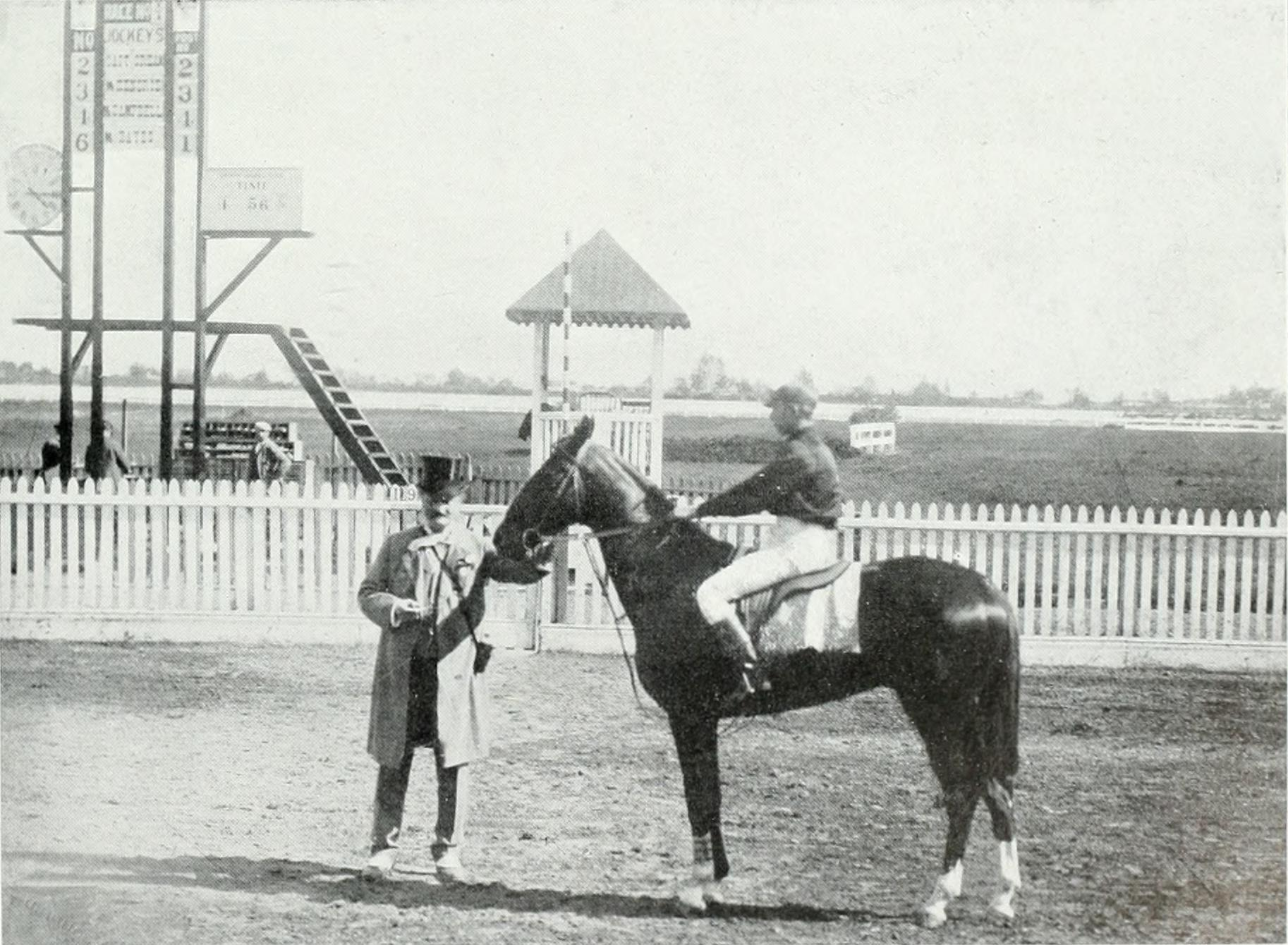
The disqualified Martimas in 1898, the winner of the Futurity, 1898: The Rancho del Paso Stake; Niagara Stake; Canadian Derby; Nautilus Stake; Toronto Cup; and Spencer Handicap. Total winnings $52,000
