= Artful =

American-bred Thoroughbred racehorse

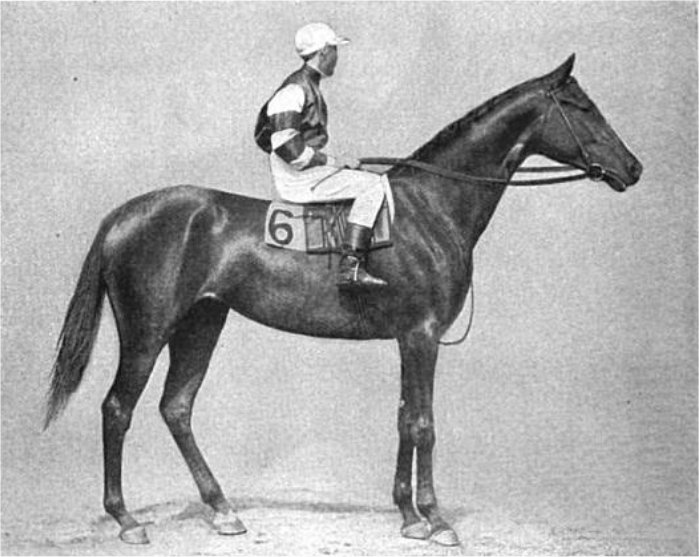
- Circa 1904
- Sire: Hamburg
- Grandsire: Hanover
- Dam: Martha II
- Damsire: Dandie Dinmont
- Sex: Filly
- Foaled: 1902
- Country: United States
- Colour: Brown
- Breeder: William Collins Whitney
- Owner: Harry Payne Whitney
- Trainer: John W. Rogers
- Record: 8: 6-2-0
- Earnings: $81,125

Major wins
- Futurity Stakes (1904); Great Filly Stakes (1904); White Plains Handicap (1904); Brighton Handicap (1905)

Awards
- American Co-Champion Two-Year-Old Filly (1904); American Co-Champion Three-Year-Old Filly (1904)

Honours
- U.S. Racing Hall of Fame (1956) #94 - Top 100 U.S. Racehorses of the 20th Century; Artful Handicap at Washington Park Race Track
- Last updated on December 1, 2007

Artful (1902–1927) was an American Thoroughbred racehorse.

== Background ==
Artful was born at the Westbury Stable at Old Westbury on Long Island into a prominent racing family begun in 1898 by William Collins Whitney. The Whitney family remain to this day a leading name in the sport of Thoroughbred horse racing.

Artful raced in the days when horses could be "declared" to win. This meant that if a stable entered more than one of its horses, it would announce beforehand which horse they expected to win the event.

== Racing career ==
In both of Artful's first two starts at age two at Saratoga Race Course (a track that William Collins Whitney had a hand in rejuvenating), her stablemate was declared to win against her. In the first of these races in August 1904 that horse was her stablemate Dreamer. In order to achieve this result, Artful had to be held back. Frank Brunnell of The Daily Racing Form hailed her as "a genuine crackerjack" who should have won both races with ease. On both occasions it was written that she was: "…hard held and close up throughout, finished as easily and probably could have won the race." Her second race was won by Princess Rupert.

These two "declared" races would be the only races Artful ever lost.

In her third "undeclared" race, the Futurity Stakes, Artful handed Sysonby his only defeat by five lengths. Artful's victory was also over a field of exceptional strength (and said at the time to be the finest juvenile field ever assembled): the Canadian champion Oiseau, the fillies and future classic winners Tanya and Agile, and the unbeaten filly Tradition. Artful raced four days later in the winning the Great Filly Stakes. She then took the White Plains Handicap under 130 pounds, giving away 29 pounds to a colt named Dandelion, and setting a new track record of 1:08 for six furlongs. That record stood for fifty years, only broken on a straight course and under a much lighter burden of 115 pounds.

William Whitney died in Artful's two-year-old season and his son, Harry Payne Whitney, succeeded him.

In her three-year-old season, Artful won two sprints to prepare for the Brighton Handicap which she took "pulling up," (slowing down). She defeated, Beldame as well as Delhi, the 1904 winner of the Belmont Stakes. Her last win was a quarter of a mile race.

== Stud record ==
As a broodmare, Artful did not reproduce herself. Her few foals were winners but not stakes winners. She died in 1927 at the age of twenty five.
