= Stamina (horse) =

American Thoroughbred racehorse

- Sire: Nasturtium
- Grandsire: Watercress
- Dam: Endurance by Right
- Damsire: Inspector B.
- Sex: Mare
- Foaled: 1905
- Country: United States
- Colour: Bay
- Breeder: Harry Payne Whitney
- Owner: Harry Payne Whitney
- Trainer: John W. Rogers (1907); A. Jack Joyner (1908)
- Record: 19: 8-2-2
- Earnings: US$ 48,595

Major wins
- Matron Stakes (1907); Double Event Stakes (part 2) (1907); Produce Stakes (1907); Gazelle Stakes (1908); Ladies Stakes (1908); Mermaid Stakes (1908); Hunter Handicap (1908)

Awards
- American Champion Two-Year-Old Filly (1907); American Champion Three-Year-Old Filly (1908)

Stamina (1905–1930) was an American Thoroughbred racehorse that was the historical top 2-year-old and 3-year-old filly in the United States in 1907 and 1908, respectively. Through the 1907 racing season, she was trained by future Hall of Fame inductee, John W. Rogers. On the death of Rogers in early 1908, another future Hall of Fame inductee, Jack Joyner, took over.

== Pedigree ==
Stamina was foaled in 1905 and was sired by the 1901 champion 2-year-old colt, Nasturtium, out of the 1901 co-champion 2-year-old mare, Endurance by Right. Nasturtium was sired by Watercress out of the mare Margerique. Margerique was sired by the imported British stallion Order out of the Algerine-bred mare Margerine. Endurance by Right was sired by the 1886 Belmont and Travers Stakes winner Inspector B. out of the mare Early Morn. She was never beaten in a race by females and her only major stakes loss was to Nasturtium in the Flatbush Stakes in 1901. Both of Stamina's parents did not race successfully as 3-year-olds due to illness.

== Offspring ==
Stamina was retired to Whitney's Brookdale Stud and produced eleven foals. Her complete list of offspring includes:

- Black filly by Hamburg (1911)
- Courage, filly by Hamburg (1912)
- Barren in 1913
- Bay colt by Hamburg (1914, died in 1915)
- Solomon, colt by All Gold (1915, later exported to Cuba as a stallion)
- Slipped foal in 1916
- Querca, filly by Broomstick (1917)
- Husky, gelding (1921, died 1927)
- Backbone, gelding (1922)
- Barren in 1923
- Delivered dead foal in 1924
- Barren in 1925
- The Blonde, filly by Mad Hatter (1926)
- Raddyio, filly by Wildair (1927)
- Untamed, filly by Wildair (1928)
- Barren in 1929
- Barren in 1930

Stamina died in 1930.
