= Lookout (horse) =

American-bred Thoroughbred racehorse

- Sire: Troubadour
- Grandsire: Lisbon
- Dam: Christina
- Damsire: King Alfonso
- Sex: Stallion, eventually Gelding
- Foaled: 1890
- Country: United States
- Colour: Chestnut
- Breeder: Downes
- Owner: 1) Cushing & Orth; 2) Joseph E. Seagram
- Trainer: Jack Downes
- Record: 66: 17-12-5
- Earnings: $17,350

Major wins
- Minneapolis Stakes (1892); Gibson Stakes (1893); Annual Stakes (1893); Coney Island Highweight Handicap (1895) American Classics wins: Kentucky Derby (1893)

Lookout (1890 – after 1898) was an American Thoroughbred racehorse that is best known for winning the 1893 Kentucky Derby. It was born in Kentucky, United States.

Lookout was a chestnut colt with full (up to the knee and hock joints) white stockings on three of his legs. His sire, Troubadour, was the 1886 Suburban Handicap winner, while his damsire, King Alfonso, was a successful flat-racer and sire.

== Kentucky Derby ==
The nineteenth Derby was run on a sunny, clear day with a field of six horses. A crowd of 10,000 spectators looked on in one of the biggest turnouts since the race's founding in 1875. J. Cushing and J. Orth had entered two of their horses, with the other being the notoriously difficult Boundless. Lookout was ridden by Edward Kunze, and Boundless had R. Williams as his jockey. Lookout was the leader throughout the race, being continually pulled back by Kunze, and won by 5 lengths.^{[3]} Plutus, Boundless, and Buck McCann (son of 1884 winner Buchanan) finished second, third, and fourth.

== Later career ==
Lookout was gelded and was sold to Canadian Joseph E. Seagram, founder of the Seagram Distillery and a major Thoroughbred owner/breeder. The last record of him racing was in a September 1896 race where he finished last. By 1897, he was gelded and racing for J.R. Walker. He was sold in Toronto in November 1898 to L. Reinhardt Jr. for $65.

== Pedigree ==
Pedigree of Lookout
Sire Troubadour 1882	Lisbon 1874	Phaeton*	King Tom*
Sire Troubadour 1882	Lisbon 1874	Phaeton*	Merry Sunshine*
Sire Troubadour 1882	Lisbon 1874	Lady Love	Caterer
Sire Troubadour 1882	Lisbon 1874	Lady Love	Chere Amie
Sire Troubadour 1882	Glenluine 1874	Glenelg	Citadel
Sire Troubadour 1882	Glenluine 1874	Glenelg	Babta
Sire Troubadour 1882	Glenluine 1874	Lute	Lexington*
Sire Troubadour 1882	Glenluine 1874	Lute	Lulu Horton
Dam Christina 1881	King Alfonso 1872	Phaeton*	King Tom*
Dam Christina 1881	King Alfonso 1872	Phaeton*	Merry Sunshine*
Dam Christina 1881	King Alfonso 1872	Capitola	Vandal
Dam Christina 1881	King Alfonso 1872	Capitola	Margrave Mare
Dam Christina 1881	Luileme 1861	Lexington*	Boston*
Dam Christina 1881	Luileme 1861	Lexington*	Alice Carneal*
Dam Christina 1881	Luileme 1861	Rosette	Yorkshire
Dam Christina 1881	Luileme 1861	Rosette	Picayune

* Lookout is inbred 3S x 3D to the stallion Phaeton, meaning that he appears third generation on the sire side of his pedigree, and third generation on the dam side of his pedigree.

* Lookout is inbred 4S x 3D to the stallion Lexington, meaning that he appears fourth generation on the sire side of his pedigree, and third generation on the dam side of his pedigree.
