= Nasturtium (horse) =

American-bred Thoroughbred racehorse

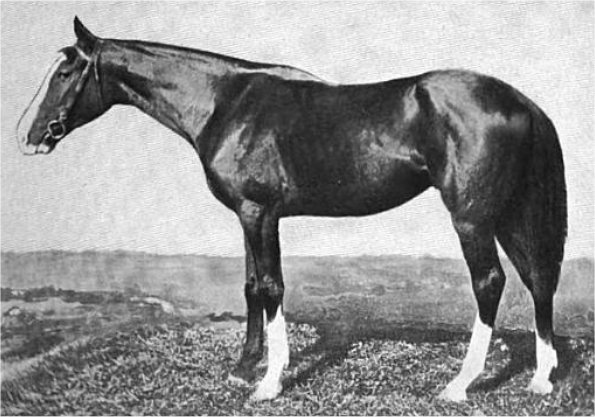
- circa 1902
- Sire: Watercress
- Grandsire: Springfield
- Dam: Margerique
- Damsire: Order
- Sex: Stallion
- Foaled: 1899
- Country: United States
- Colour: Chestnut
- Breeder: James B. A. Haggin
- Owner: 1) William A. Chanler & J. G. Follansbee; 2) Anthony L. Aste; 3) William C. Whitney; 4) Col. Milton Young; 5) George J. Stoll
- Trainer: 2) John W. Rogers

Major wins
- Double Event Stakes (part 1) (1901); Flatbush Stakes (1901)

Awards
- American Champion Two-Year-Old Colt (1901)

Nasturtium (1899–1916) was an American Thoroughbred racehorse that was the top two-year-old colt of 1901. He was a scheduled contender for the 1902 Epsom Derby, but did not run in the race due to illness.

== Pedigree ==
Nasturtium, a "racy-looking and powerful" chestnut horse standing 15.2 hands high was bred at James Haggin's Rancho El Paso stud in California and was sired by the imported British stallion Watercress out of Margerique. Margerique was an unraced mare by the imported British stallion Order out of Margerine, who also foaled another successful racer The Commoner.

== Racing career ==
Haggin sold Nasturtium as a yearling to Follansbee and Chanler, who in turn sold him to Anthony L. Aste for $4,300 at auction in 1901. Nasturtium was sold to William C. Whitney on June 22, 1901 for $50,000. His training was then taken over by John W. Rogers. Nasturtium won three of his five starts in 1901. He was a disappointing 9/5 favorite when finishing tenth behind Yankee in the Futurity Stakes on August 31 at Belmont, but won the Flatbush Stakes at Sheepshead Bay Race Track four days later. He took the race "cleverly, almost easily" from his stablemate Goldsmith in a track record time of 1:25.6.

Whitney's target for the colt was the 1902 Epsom Derby, having won the race in 1901 with Volodyovski. In December 1901 Nasturtium was shipped to England on a steamer equipped with a purpose-built stable unit. His arrival at Newmarket, Suffolk was reported to have caused "considerable interest," and was offered at odds of 6/1 for the Epsom Classic. Despite all Whitney's precautions however, Nasturtium fell ill shortly after his arrival and was unable to run in England as intended.

== Stud career ==
After William Whitney's death, Nasturtium was sold in the October 1904 dispersal sale for $10,000 to Col. Milton Young. Nasturtium was later sold to George J. Stoll. The best of his offspring was probably the filly Stamina. Nasturtium was found dead in his stall at Stoll's The Meadows stud farm in Lexington on June 26, 1916. His death may have resulted from heart disease.
