= Troubadour (horse) =

American-bred Thoroughbred racehorse

- Sire: Lisbon
- Grandsire: Phaeton
- Dam: Glenluine
- Damsire: Lexington
- Sex: Stallion
- Foaled: 1882
- Country: United States
- Colour: Dark Bay
- Breeder: Woodburn Stud
- Owner: Daniel Swigert; Col. Milton Young; Samuel S. Brown
- Trainer: John W. Rogers
- Record: 40 starts-17 wins
- Earnings: US$

Major wins
- Suburban Handicap (1886); Ocean Stakes (1887); Monmouth Cup (1887)

Awards
- American Champion Older Male Horse (1886, 1887)

Troubadour (1882 – January 16, 1906) was an American Thoroughbred Champion racehorse. Bred in Kentucky by A. J. Alexander's Woodburn Stud, he was sired by Lisbon, a son of the imported British stallion Phaeton who in turn was a son of two-time Leading sire in Great Britain and Ireland, King Tom. His dam was Glenluine, a daughter of U.S. Racing Hall of Fame inductee Lexington who was the Leading sire in North America sixteen times and prepotent sire of the second half of the 19th century.

== Racing career ==
=== 1884: two-year-old season ===
Troubadour was sold as a yearling to Daniel Swigert for $400 who raced him at age two but after winning once, Swigert sold him to Col. Milton Young of McGrathiana Stud for $7,500.

On May 17, 1884, Troubadour ran second in the Alexander Stakes at the Louisville Jockey Club track and a week later finished out of the money in the track's Tennessee Stakes. He won the June 6 Sensation Stakes at Latonia Race Track and the Criterion Stakes at the Chicago Driving Park on June 26. On July 1, Troubadour ran third in the Kenwood Stakes at Washington Park Race Track in Chicago and ran second in a race for two-year-olds at the Saratoga Race Course on August 22 then won there again five days later. Troubadour returned to Kentucky to compete at the Louisville Jockey Club track where he won on September 25 and scored two more wins in October at Latonia Race Track, taking the Kimball Stakes and the Barrett Stakes.

Although inconsistent throughout most of 1884, Troubadour ended the year having won seven of his fourteen starts.

=== 1885: three-year-old season ===
Troubadour made twenty-one starts at age three. He won five times, including the St. Leger Stakes at St. Louis, Missouri by twenty lengths, On December 19, 1885, owner Milton Young sold off his entire racing stable at an auction in Lexington, Kentucky and Troubadour was sold to W. L. Cassidy of St. Louis. He was then soon sold to Samuel S. Brown, a Pittsburgh, Pennsylvania coal mining magnate and the prominent owner/breeder of Senorita Stud Farm near Lexington, Kentucky.

=== 1886: four-year-old season ===
Under his new owner, Troubadour's race conditioning was taken over by future Hall of Fame trainer, John W. Rogers. On June 1, 1886, Troubadour won a race at Latonia then was sent to Brooklyn, New York where on June 10 he won the most important race of his career at Sheepshead Bay Race Track, easily defeating a large and strong field in the Suburban Handicap. On June 29, in a special mile and a quarter race at Sheepshead Bay, he beat the great Miss Woodford by half a length. After injuring a leg, Troubadour did not race again that year. In spite of his limited number of races, his dominating performances led to Troubadour being retrospectively rated American Champion Older Male Horse honors for 1886.

=== 1887: five-year-old season ===
Racing at age five in 1887, in the June 21 Coney Island Stakes at Sheepshead Bay Race Track, Troubadour finished second to A. J. Cassatt's outstanding runner, The Bard. In their ensuing two meetings at Monmouth Park Racetrack in Long Branch, New Jersey, Troubadour defeated The Bard in the 1 1/8 miles (1.8 km) Ocean Stakes on July 4 and then again on July 14 in the 1 3/4-mile (2.8 km) Monmouth Cup. In the Freehold Stakes on August 4, Troubadour suffered a career-ending injury while finishing third to The Bard and runner-up, Barnum. On August 13, Capt. Brown announced the horse was being retired to stud at his Lexington, Kentucky farm.

== Stud record ==
As a stallion, Troubadour notably sired Lookout (b. 1890), winner of the 1893 Kentucky Derby. In addition, in 1890 he sired a homebred for Samuel Brown named Daily America who won the 1893 Lawrence Realization Stakes. Through his daughter, Ethel Pace, Troubadour was the damsire of Leonardo II, winner of the 1921 Withers Stakes.

Troubadour died at Senorita Stud Farm at age twenty-four on January 16, 1906.
