= Sir Dixon =

American-bred Thoroughbred racehorse

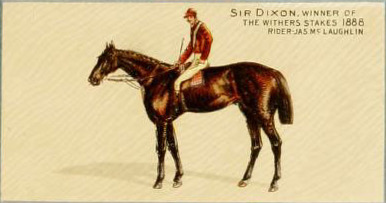
- from Album of celebrated American and English running horses (c. 1888)
- Sire: Billet
- Grandsire: Voltigeur
- Dam: Jaconet
- Damsire: Lexington
- Sex: Stallion
- Foaled: 1885
- Country: United States
- Colour: Bay
- Breeder: Clay & Woodford
- Owner: Dwyer Brothers
- Trainer: Frank McCabe

Major wins
- Camden Stakes (1887); Select Stakes (1887); Flatbush Stakes (1887); Analostan Stakes (1888); Withers Stakes (1888); Lorillard Stakes (1888); Travers Stakes (1888); Triple Crown wins: Belmont Stakes (1888)
- Last updated on March 8, 2022

Sir Dixon (1885–1909) was an American Thoroughbred racehorse best known for winning the 1888 Belmont Stakes.

== Background ==
Sir Dixon was bred by Ezekiel F. Clay and Catesby Woodford at Runnymede Farm in Kentucky. His sire was Billet, an English stakes winner, and his dam was Jaconet, a daughter of leading sire Leamington and a full sister to the 1879 Preakness Stakes winner Harold and Iroquois, who had a successful racing career in England. Sir Dixon was sold at some point to Green B. Morris.

== Racing career ==
As a two-year-old, Sir Dixon won the Camden Stakes, the Select Stakes, and the Flatbush Stakes. After his victory in the Flatbush Stakes, the Dwyer Brothers Stable, impressed with his performance, purchased him from Green B. Morris for $20,000.

Sir Dixon began his three-year-old season by running in the Analostan Stakes, which he won. He then ran in the Withers Stakes and beat out Prince Royal by a nose. The race was controversial, with some believing victory had been awarded to the wrong horse by the judges. Following the Withers Stakes, Sir Dixon's jockey William Fitzpatrick was replaced by Jim McLaughlin. One June 9, 1888, nine days after the Withers Stakes, Sir Dixon ran in the Belmont Stakes. The only horse he was competing against was Prince Royal, and Sir Dixon was heavily favored to win. Sure enough, Sir Dixon won the race by 12 lengths.

After his victory in the Belmont, Sir Dixon ran in the Lorillard Stakes. He was the heavy favorite to win, and won the race by two lengths. He then came first in the Travers Stakes, and third in the Brooklyn Derby.

As a five-year-old, Sir Dixon ran in the Brooklyn Handicap and was heavily favored to win, but ended up not placing at all, with a horse named Castaway II winning the race. Sir Dixon was retired from racing shortly afterwards.

== Later life ==
After his retirement from racing, Sir Dixon was sold back to his original breeders at Runnymede Farm for $10,000. Sir Dixon had a successful career as a sire, and headed the American list of sires in 1901. He was the third leading sire in America the following year.

On March 23, 1909, Sir Dixon broke his hip in a paddock accident and was humanely euthanized.

== Pedigree ==
Pedigree of Sir Dixon
Sire Billet 1865	Voltigeur 1847	Voltaire	Blacklock
Sire Billet 1865	Voltigeur 1847	Voltaire	Phantom Mare
Sire Billet 1865	Voltigeur 1847	Martha Lynn	Mulatto
Sire Billet 1865	Voltigeur 1847	Martha Lynn	Leda
Sire Billet 1865	Calcutta 1853	Flatcatcher	Touchstone
Sire Billet 1865	Calcutta 1853	Flatcatcher	Decoy
Sire Billet 1865	Calcutta 1853	Miss Martin	St Martin
Sire Billet 1865	Calcutta 1853	Miss Martin	Wagtail
Dam Jaconet 1875	Leamington 1853	Faugh-a-Ballagh	Sir Hercules
Dam Jaconet 1875	Leamington 1853	Faugh-a-Ballagh	Guiccioli
Dam Jaconet 1875	Leamington 1853	Pantaloon Mare	Pantaloon
Dam Jaconet 1875	Leamington 1853	Pantaloon Mare	Daphne
Dam Jaconet 1875	Maggie B. B. 1867	Australian	West Australian
Dam Jaconet 1875	Maggie B. B. 1867	Australian	Emilia
Dam Jaconet 1875	Maggie B. B. 1867	Madeline	Boston
Dam Jaconet 1875	Maggie B. B. 1867	Madeline	Magnolia
