= Martimas =

Canadian thoroughbred racehorse (1896–1916)

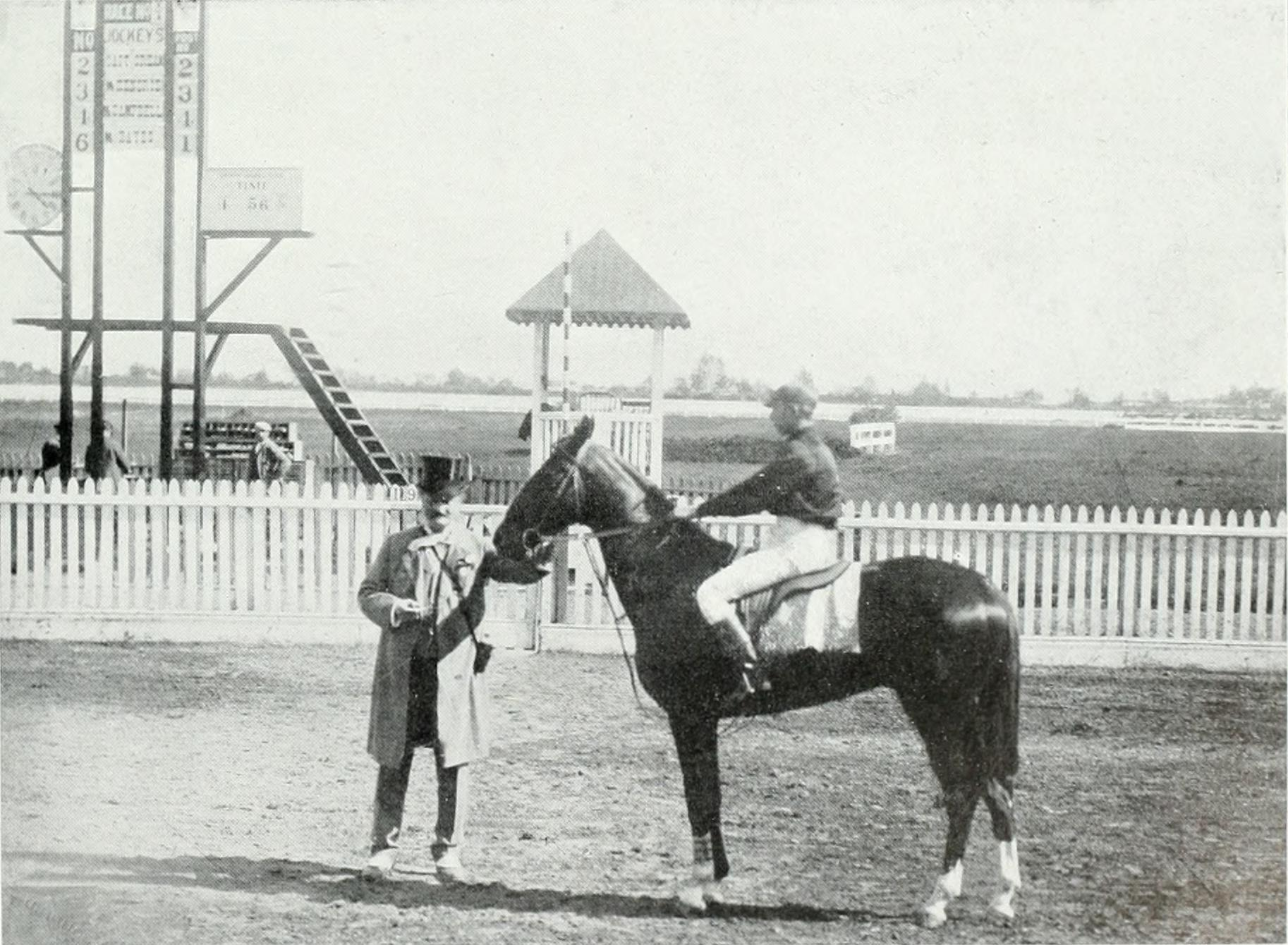
- Martimas in 1898 at Sheepshead Bay Race Track
- Sire: Candlemas
- Grandsire: Hermit
- Dam: Biggonet
- Damsire: Bramble
- Sex: Stallion
- Foaled: 1896
- Country: United States
- Colour: Chestnut
- Breeder: Cornelius J. Enright & Walter B. Jennings
- Owner: William M. Hendrie
- Trainer: Edward Whyte
- Record: 38: 12-9-5
- Earnings: US$51,495

Major wins
- Futurity Stakes (1898); Rancho Del Paso Stakes (1898); St. Lawrence Stakes (1898); Canadian Derby (1899); Toronto Cup Handicap (1900)

Honours
- Canadian Horse Racing Hall of Fame (2001); Martimas Wing, Hamilton General Hospital

Martimas (1896–1916) was a Canadian Horse Racing Hall of Fame Thoroughbred racehorse who competed in Canada as well as the United States where he won the Futurity Stakes, the richest and most prestigious race in the country.

== Background ==
Martimas was a son of Candlemas and out of the mare Biggonet. Candlemas was bred in England by Henry Sturt. A son of Hermit, he had some success racing for owner Sir Frederick Johnstone. At age six, Candlemas was sold to South African interests where he raced for a time before going to stud. In 1892 Candlemas was sold to stand at stud in the United States for the renowned Elmendorf Farm in Lexington, Kentucky, owned at the time by Cornelius Enright.

Biggonet, the dam of Martimas, was owned by Walter Jennings who stood her as a broodmare for himself at Elmendorf Farm. Biggonet, an 1883 foal of Tennessee's Belle Meade Stud, had raced successfully for owner/trainer William P. Burch with notable wins at New York tracks. In 1885 Biggonet won the Spinaway Stakes for two-year-old fillies and in 1886 beat her male counterparts in the Withers Stakes. Sold to Walter Jennings, Biggonet raced and won at age six. Biggonet's sire was Bramble who also sired U.S. Racing Hall of Fame inductees Ben Brush and Clifford. In 1895 Biggonet was bred to the Elmendorf stallion Candlemas. The result was the Chestnut colt Martimas that would be sold as a yearling for $750 to Torontonian William Hendrie who brought him to Canada to be race-conditioned by trainer Edward Whyte.

== Racing career ==
=== 1898: two-year-old season ===
Martimas won his first three starts, all at five furlongs. On July 4, 1898, he won a five furlong at Ontario's Fort Erie Race Track then won another similar event on July 12. Sent to race in Montreal, Martimas easily won the St. Lawrence Stakes, the featured race on the July 20 card at the racetrack owned by the Bel Air Jockey Club. Based on these performances, his handlers decided to try him against some of the best two-year-olds in the United States and sent him to compete in the Saratoga, New York race meet in August. Entered in both parts of the Grand Union Hotel Stakes, on August 6 Martimas finished second to Kentucky Colonel in the first part run at five furlongs, and on August 20 he ran fourth in part two at six furlongs to winner Matanza.

For the August 23, 1898 Futurity Stakes hosted by New York's Sheepshead Bay Race Track, Martimas was ridden by Harry Lewis who had been aboard the colt for his win in Montreal's St. Lawrence Stakes. Sent off at 50 to 1 odds, Martimas won the Futurity by three lengths over twenty-two competitors. Owner William Hendrie donated all of the purse money he received for winning the Futurity to help build the Martimas Wing at the Hamilton General Hospital in his hometown of Hamilton, Ontario.

Still competing in New York state, Martimas would win the October 8 Rancho Del Paso Stakes at Morris Park Racecourse. With jockey Harry Lewis back racing in Canada, future Hall of Fame jockey Fred Taral was aboard. In a December 22, 1916 retrospective referencing The Canadian Sportsman magazine, the Daily Racing Form reported that "His greatest performance as a two-year-old was probably in the Rancho Del Paso Stakes in which he ran three-quarters of a mile in the mud the heavy weight up, in 1:12 and a fraction."

=== 1899-1900: three and four-year-old seasons ===
At age three, Martimas most important win came in the 1899 Canadian Derby at the Fort Erie Race Track.

The following year, the four-year-old Martimas won the 1900 edition of the Toronto Cup at Woodbine Racetrack and the Spencer Handicap at Saratoga.

=== At stud ===
As a sire Martimas stood for his owner at his Valley Farm in Aldershot, Ontario. Although he served a limited number of mares, Martimas sired two winners of Canada's most important race, the King's Plate. His colt were Kelvin won the 1907 running and Shimonese won in 1909.

Following the death of Martimas in 1916, a December 22, 1916 article referencing The Canadian Sportsman magazine, the Daily Racing Form reported that as of that date the Martimas 1911 filly Slipper Day was the "fastest filly ever bred in Canada." Slipper Day was owned by William Hendrie's son, John Strathearn Hendrie, a successful businessman and politician who would serve as the 11th Lieutenant Governor of Ontario.

In 2001, Martimas would be inducted into the Canadian Horse Racing Hall of Fame.

== Pedigree ==
Pedigree of Martimas, chestnut colt, 1896
Sire Candlemas	Hermit	Newminster	Touchstone
Sire Candlemas	Hermit	Newminster	Beeswing
Sire Candlemas	Hermit	Seclusion	Tadmor
Sire Candlemas	Hermit	Seclusion	Miss Sellon
Sire Candlemas	Fusee	Marsyas	Orlando
Sire Candlemas	Fusee	Marsyas	Malibran
Sire Candlemas	Fusee	Vesuvienne	Gladiator
Sire Candlemas	Fusee	Vesuvienne	Venus
Dam Biggonet	Bramble	Bonnie Scotland	Iago
Dam Biggonet	Bramble	Bonnie Scotland	Queen Mary
Dam Biggonet	Bramble	Ivy Leaf	Australian
Dam Biggonet	Bramble	Ivy Leaf	Bay Flower
Dam Biggonet	Bobinet	Brown Dick	Margrave
Dam Biggonet	Bobinet	Brown Dick	Fanny King
Dam Biggonet	Bobinet	Valentia	Childe Harold
Dam Biggonet	Bobinet	Valentia	Talma (family: A10)
