= Salvator (horse) =

American-bred Thoroughbred racehorse

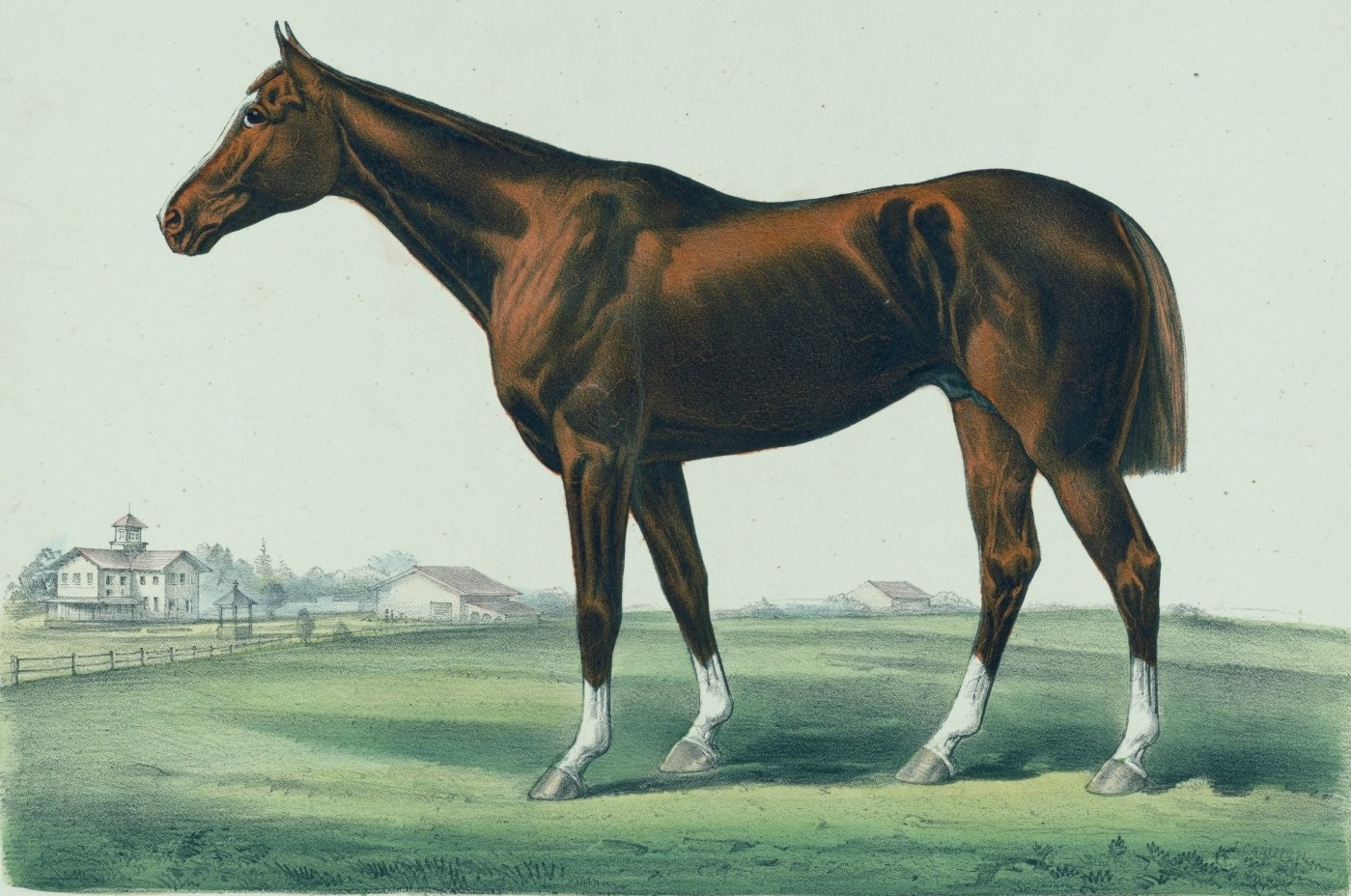
- "Salvator by Currier and Ives"
- Sire: Prince Charlie
- Grandsire: Black Athol
- Dam: Salina
- Damsire: Lexington
- Sex: Stallion
- Foaled: 1886
- Country: USA
- Color: Chestnut
- Breeder: Daniel Swigert
- Owner: James Ben Ali Haggin
- Trainer: Matthew Byrnes
- Record: 19: 16-1-1
- Earnings: $113,240

Major wins
- Flatbush Stakes (1888); Titan Stakes (1888); September Stakes (1889); Tidal Stakes (1889); Lawrence Realization Stakes (1889); Suburban Handicap (1890); Monmouth Cup (1890); Champion Stakes (1890)

Awards
- U.S. Champion 3-Yr-Old Colt (1889); United States Horse of the Year (1889, 1890)

Honors
- United States Racing Hall of Fame (1988); Salvator Mile Handicap at Monmouth Park Racetrack
- Last updated on November 25, 2006

Salvator (1886–1909) was an American Hall of Fame Thoroughbred racehorse considered by many to be one of the best racers during the latter half of the 19th century.

== Background ==
Bred by Daniel Swigert of Elmendorf Farm in Lexington, Kentucky, Salvator was sired by Prince Charlie out of Salina (by Lexington). (Salvator was the last great horse Swigart bred; his best stallions had grown old and died.) On his sire's side, he went back to the tremendous mare Pocahontas by Glencoe. On his dam's side, through Lexington, he carried the blood of Boston sired by Timoleon sired by Sir Archie sired by Diomed.

Unusual for the times, the dark chestnut with a large white blaze was born in 1886 in California. James Ben Ali Haggin had purchased his dam, Salina, and shipped her to his 44,000-acre (180 km^{2}) Rancho Del Paso with Salvator in utero. Haggin had made his money in the California Gold Rush of 1849, so much of it he was suddenly one of the wealthiest men in America, and he used his new wealth to establish the biggest horse breeding operations in world history. Aside from the thousands of grazing acres he owned in Arizona, New Mexico and Southern California, he headquartered at the Rancho del Paso near the present-day city of Sacramento. He bought breeding horses from every state that bred fine thoroughbreds, as well as shipping them in from Ireland, Australia and England. Eventually he bought Swigert's Elmendorf Farm and moved his headquarters there. Haggin added to the property until he held 8,700 acres (35 km^{2}) of prime bluegrass. (Over time, and through several owners, this property was broken up into stud farms like Spendthrift Farm, Greentree Stud, and others.)

In the fall of 1887, Haggin's Eastern trainer, Matthew Byrnes, and jockey Edward "Snapper" Garrison arrived at the ranch to choose the best young horses to take back to New York. Salvator was one of their choices.

== Proctor Knott vs Salvator ==
Because he had bucked his shins in one of his trials while training in California, Salvator did not start racing until August of his two-year-old season. He made his debut in the Junior Champion Stakes against a seasoned colt, Proctor Knott (sired by the great Luke Blackburn). Proctor Knott, who'd already run six races (and who in the following year would lose the Kentucky Derby to Spokane in what seemed a dead heat), was the one horse Salvator could never beat. In his first start, Salvator finished off the board. Proctor Knott and Salvator met three weeks later in the new Futurity at Coney Island and again Proctor Knott won, but this time Salvator came second by only half a length. The Futurity had attracted a great of attention because at the time it was the richest race in America. Proctor Knott, winning it and thereby winning more money than most 19th century horses in a lifetime, did not race again that year. Salvator, meanwhile, went on to win four races in a row: the Flatbush Stakes, the Maple, the Tuckahoe and the Titan Stakes.

Salvator met Proctor Knott only once as a three-year-old in the Omnibus Stakes. Neither of them won, but Proctor Knott beat Salvator by placing, while Salvator showed. It was a blanket finish in which a colt called Longstreet (a son of Longfellow, who was known as "King of the Turf") won. Salvator never lost again. Four days later, he won the Jersey Handicap. He also won all seven of his other races that year, while Proctor Knott won only twice in nine starts. In the Tidal Stakes at Sheepshead Bay, Salvator beat Eric, the winner of the Belmont Stakes.

== Salvator vs Tenny ==
Tenny was Salvator's closest rival for three-year-old honors. They met in the inaugural running of the Realization Stakes, which Salvator won. Tenny placed. (This race is now called the Lawrence Realization Stakes.) In their fourth year, the rivalry became serious.

Tenny had a low-slung back, causing him to be called "The Swayback". At the start of his four-year-old season, Tenny won four races in succession. Salvator had been sitting on the sidelines for the beginning of the year, but in his first race as a four-year-old, he faced Tenny in the 7th running of the Suburban Handicap, then taking place at Sheepshead Bay.

Salvator won the Suburban. Tenny's owner, David T. Pulsifer, was disgusted with the race and challenged Haggin to a match race. They went back and forth over the conditions of the match but finally came to an agreement. The race would be run at Sheepshead Bay on June 25, 1890.

Ridden by Isaac Murphy, Salvator won by half a head. Walter S. Vosburgh, from "Racing in America, 1866-1921," (The Jockey Club, 1922) described the race like this: "The two horses ran side by side for three furlongs. Then Salvator led by two lengths. Once in the stretch, however, Tenny came very fast and was overhauling Salvator, but the latter 'lasted' to win by a nose in 2:05. Both jockeys thought they had won after they had pulled up, and walked their horses back, chatting as they did so. 'I think I beat you,' said Garrison.”

Ella Wheeler Wilcox wrote a poem about the race called How Salvator Won. Its ending reads: “We are under the string now—the great race is done—And Salvator, Salvator, Salvator won!”

Meanwhile, the new Monmouth Park Racetrack had opened, replacing the old Monmouth track. It was enormous, the biggest track in America, and it raced clockwise in the European fashion. Salvator made his appearance in the Monmouth Cup. Not a horse showed up to face him, and he jogged around for the $1,800 prize. After that, only Tenny came out to face Salvator in the Champion Stakes at the same track. Salvator won by four lengths.

Salvator then raced the clock, shattering the old record for the mile with a time of 1:35 1/2 under jockey Marty Bergen. He never raced again.

== National Champion & Hall of Fame recognition ==
Salvator would be recognized as the American National Champion 3-Yr-Old Colt of 1889 as well as that year's American Horse of the Year and again in 1890.

Following the creation of the National Museum of Racing and Hall of Fame in 1955, Salvator was one of the horses inducted.

== Retirement ==
Though Tenny raced for two more seasons than Salvator, both eventually went to stud. Neither horse was a success. In 1909, when they were both twenty three years old, Salvator died first.

Salvator is honored with the Grade III Salvator Stakes at Monmouth Park Racetrack.
