= Fashion Stakes =

- Class: Discontinued stakes
- Location: Aqueduct Racetrack; Queens, New York, USA
- Inaugurated: 1889
- Race type: Thoroughbred – Flat racing
- Website: www.nyra.com/index_aqueduct.html

Race information
- Distance: 5 furlongs
- Surface: Dirt
- Track: left-handed
- Qualification: Two-year-old fillies
- Weight: Assigned

The Fashion Stakes was an American Thoroughbred horse race for two-year-old fillies. Raced on dirt over a distance of five furlongs, it was run annually from 1889 through 2005. Inaugurated at Morris Park Racecourse in Westchester County, New York, when that facility closed in 1904 the race was run at Belmont Park and at Aqueduct Racetrack.

The Fashion Stakes was often used as either the first or second start in a young filly's racing career. The event attracted some of the best bred fillies on the East Coast of the United States with several future Champions winning the race including Hall of Fame inductees Affectionately and Ruffian.

The Fashion Stakes was placed on hiatus after the 1984 edition and was not run again until being revived on June 3, 1999.

== Records ==
Speed records On May 7, 1946, in her first start at Belmont Park First Flight equaled the track record time of 51 seconds for 4 1/2 furlongs which had been set in the Fashion Stakes in 1928 by Orissa.

On May 19, 1971, Ogden Phipps' Numbered Account set a Fashion Stakes record of 0:57 2/5 for five furlongs on dirt at Aqueduct Racetrack.

On June 12, 1974, Mr. and Mrs. Stuart Janney's Ruffian set a Fashion Stakes record that also equaled the Belmont Park track record of 1:03 flat for the then race distance of 5 1/2 furlongs on dirt.|

Most wins by a jockey:

- 4 – Braulio Baeza (1962, 1964, 1971, 1972)

Most wins by a trainer:

- 6 – James G. Rowe Sr. (1890, 1897, 1906, 1917, 1920, 1926)

Most wins by an owner:

- 6 – Harry Payne Whitney (1917, 1920, 1922, 1924, 1926, 1930)

== Winners ==
| Year | Winner | Age | Jockey | Trainer | Owner | Dist. (Furlongs) | Time | Track |
|---|---|---|---|---|---|---|---|---|
| 2005 | Fifth Avenue | 2 | Pablo Fragoso | Mark A. Hennig | G. R. & S. Stable | 5 F | 0:58.24 | BEL |
| 2004 | Chocolate Brown | 2 | Javier Castellano | Jason Servis | Dennis Drazin | 5 F | 0:57.86 | BEL |
| 2003 | Rodeo Licious | 2 | Richard Migliore | Carl J. Deville | Our Blue Streaks & Pre K Stables | 5 F | 0:58.19 | BEL |
| 2002 | Holiday Runner | 2 | Jerry D. Bailey | D. Wayne Lukas | S. J. Bee Stable | 5 F | 0:58.26 | BEL |
| 2001 | Smok'n Frolic | 2 | Jerry D. Bailey | Todd A. Pletcher | Dogwood Stable | 5 F | 0:57.92 | BEL |
| 2000 | With Ability | 2 | Jerry D. Bailey | Mark A. Hennig | Edward P. Evans | 5 F | 0:58.11 | BEL |
| 1999 | Gilded Diablo | 2 | John Velazquez | Mark A. Hennig | Bernie Sams Jr. | 5 F | 0:58.00 | BEL |
| 1984 | – 1998 | No races held | | | | | | |
| 1983 | Mink Hat | 2 | Craig Perret | Warren A. Croll Jr. | Blanche P. Levy | 5.5 F | 1:05.60 | BEL |
| 1982 | Singing Susan | 2 | William Passmore | George Clarke | Robert Quinichette | 5.5 F | 1:04.20 | BEL |
| 1981 | Before Dawn | 2 | Jorge Velásquez | John M. Veitch | Calumet Farm | 5.5 F | 1:04.20 | BEL |
| 1980 | Sue Babe | 2 | George Martens | Roger Laurin | Howard Kaskel | 5.5 F | 1:06.40 | BEL |
| 1979 | Royal Suite | 2 | Jeffrey Fell | Roger Laurin | Reginald N. Webster | 5.5 F | 1:04.60 | BEL |
| 1978 | Palm Hut | 2 | Roger Velez | James E. Picou | Joseph M. Roebling | 5.5 F | 1:03.60 | BEL |
| 1977 | Sunny Bay | 2 | Larry Saumell | Warren A. Croll Jr. | Aisco Stable | 5.5 F | 1:06.00 | BEL |
| 1976 | Drama Critic | 2 | Jean Cruguet | John P. Campo | Elmendorf Farm | 5.5 F | 1:05.80 | BEL |
| 1975 | Dearly Precious | 2 | Michael Hole | Stephen A. DiMauro | Richard E. Bailey | 5.5 F | 1:05.40 | BEL |
| 1974 | Ruffian | 2 | Jacinto Vásquez | Frank Y. Whiteley Jr. | Stuart & Barbara Janney | 5.5 F | 1:03.00 | BEL |
| 1973 | In Hot Pursuit | 2 | Ángel Cordero Jr. | Roger Laurin | Ogden Mills Phipps | 5.5 F | 1:03.20 | BEL |
| 1972 | Queen's Mark | 2 | Braulio Baeza | John P. Campo | Elmendorf Farm | 5.5 F | 1:05.20 | BEL |
| 1971 | Numbered Account | 2 | Braulio Baeza | Edward A. Neloy | Ogden Phipps | 5 F | 0:57.40 | AQU |
| 1970 | Deceit | 2 | Ray Broussard | Del W. Carroll | Windfields Farm | 5 F | 0:58.60 | AQU |
| 1969 | Ridin Easy | 2 | Heliodoro Gustines | Thomas M. Walsh | Chance Hill Farms | 5 F | 0:57.60 | AQU |
| 1968 | Show Off | 2 | Jesse Davidson | Willard C. Freeman | Alfred G. Vanderbilt II | 5 F | 0:58.00 | AQU |
| 1967 | Jet To Market | 2 | Grady Overton | David Erb | Roger W. Wilson | 5 F | 0:58.40 | AQU |
| 1966 | Lake Chelan | 2 | Walter Blum | Casey Hayes | Christopher Chenery | 5 F | 0:59.40 | AQU |
| 1965 | Sundestine | 2 | Larry Adams | Norman R. McLeod | Fleming B. Fraser | 5 F | 0:59.40 | AQU |
| 1964 | Queen Empress | 2 | Braulio Baeza | William C. Winfrey | Wheatley Stable | 5 F | 0:58.20 | AQU |
| 1963 | Behaving Deby | 2 | Jimmy Combest | William R. Mitchell | Fritz Dorico | 5 F | 0:59.20 | AQU |
| 1962 | Affectionately | 2 | Braulio Baeza | Hirsch Jacobs | Ethel D. Jacobs | 5 F | 0:58.80 | AQU |
| 1961 | Laurel Mae | 2 | Sidney Cole | Thomas A. Kelly | Mrs. Steven B. Wilson | 5 F | 0:58.80 | AQU |
| 1960 | Apatontheback | 2 | Ray Broussard | Clyde Troutt | Ada L. Rice | 5 F | 0:58.20 | AQU |
| 1959 | Irish Jay | 2 | Eddie Arcaro | James E. Fitzsimmons | Wheatley Stable | 5 F | 0:58.80 | BEL |
| 1958 | Lawdy Claudy | 2 | Eddie Arcaro | T. J. Kelly | David P. Reynolds | 5 F | 0:59.60 | BEL |
| 1957 | Poly Hi | 2 | Eric Guerin | George M. Odom | Mrs. George Zauderer | 5 F | 1:00.00 | BEL |
| 1956 | Miss Blue Jay | 2 | Eric Guerin | Sol Rutchick | Mrs. Adele Rutchick | 5 F | 0:58.20 | BEL |
| 1955 | Pretty Plunger | 2 | Ted Atkinson | T. J. Kelly | Ada L. Rice | 4.5 F | 0:51.20 | BEL |
| 1954 | Sofarsogood | 2 | Jimmy Nichols | Frank Barnett | Hal Price Headley | 4.5 F | 0:51.20 | BEL |
| 1953 | Evening Out | 2 | Ovie Scurlock | Winbert F. Mulholland | Jessie S. D. Widener | 4.5 F | 0:52.00 | BEL |
| 1952 | Countess Jane | 2 | Ted Atkinson | George P. Odom | Leroy Hetzel | 4.5 F | 0:52.20 | BEL |
| 1951 | Cigar Maid | 2 | Benny Green | Walter A. Kelley | Jack W. Schiffer | 4.5 F | 0:52.00 | BEL |
| 1950 | Remove | 2 | William Boland | Frank Barnett | Hal Price Headley | 4.5 F | 0:52.00 | BEL |
| 1949 | Rare Perfume | 2 | Emil Flutie | Winbert F. Mulholland | George D. Widener Jr. | 4.5 F | 0:51.40 | BEL |
| 1948 | Fond Embrace | 2 | Ronnie Nash | Ralph G. Kercheval | Frank Frankel | 4.5 F | 0:53.80 | BEL |
| 1947 | Caltha | 2 | Jack Westrope | William B. Finnegan | Walter P. Chrysler Jr. | 4.5 F | 0:52.20 | BEL |
| 1946 | First Flight | 2 | Arnold Klrkland | Sylvester Veitch | C. V. Whitney | 4.5 F | 0:51.00 | BEL |
| 1945 | Beaugay | 2 | John Adams | Tom Smith | Maine Chance Farm | 4.5 F | 0:51.80 | BEL |
| 1944 | Bertie S. | 2 | Herb Lindberg | Hirsch Jacobs | Isidor Bieber | 4.5 F | 0:54.20 | BEL |
| 1943 | Mrs. Ames | 2 | Ted Atkinson | Preston M. Burch | Longchamps Farms | 4.5 F | 0:51.60 | BEL |
| 1942 | Pomrose | 2 | Nicholas Coule | Winbert F. Mulholland | George D. Widener Jr. | 4.5 F | 0:52.40 | BEL |
| 1941 | Spanish Moss | 2 | Eddie Arcaro | John M. Gaver Sr. | Greentree Stable | 5 F | 1:00.60 | BEL |
| 1940 | Maemante | 2 | Basil James | George E. Phillips | Maemere Farm | 4.5 F | 0:51.40 | BEL |
| 1939 | Perida | 2 | Wayne Wright | Daniel E. Stewart | Joseph E. Widener | 4.5 F | 0:52.00 | BEL |
| 1938 | Sweet Patrice | 2 | Wayne Wright | Hirsch Jacobs | Ethel D. Jacobs | 4.5 F | 0:53.00 | BEL |
| 1937 | Catalysis | 2 | Earl Steffen | Henry McDaniel | Starmount Stable | 4.5 F | 0:58.20 | BEL |
| 1936 | Apogee | 2 | Willie Saunders | Duval A. Headley | Hal Price Headley | 4.5 F | 0:51.80 | BEL |
| 1935 | Mag Mell | 2 | Francis Horn | James E. Fitzsimmons | Wheatley Stable | 4.5 F | 0:54.80 | BEL |
| 1934 | Motto | 2 | Raymond Workman | Thomas J. Healey | C. V. Whitney | 4.5 F | 0:52.40 | BEL |
| 1933 | Blue For Boys | 2 | Robert Jones | James W. Healy | Llangollen Farm Stable | 4.5 F | 0:52.80 | BEL |
| 1932 | Glorify | 2 | Harvey Elston | Clyde Phillips | Middleburg Stable | 4.5 F | 0:52.20 | BEL |
| 1931 | Polonaise | 2 | Earl Steffen | Bennet W. Creech | William R. Coe | 4.5 F | 0:53.00 | BEL |
| 1930 | Zelide | 2 | Raymond Workman | Thomas J. Healey | Harry Payne Whitney | 4.5 F | 0:52.40 | BEL |
| 1929 | Adequate | 2 | Danny McAuliffe | James E. Fitzsimmons | Henry C. Phipps | 4.5 F | 0:52.20 | BEL |
| 1928 | Orissa | 2 | Laverne Fator | Sam Hildreth | Rancocas Stable | 4.5 F | 0:51.00 | BEL |
| 1927 | Bateau | 2 | Willie Kelsay | Scott P. Harlan | Walter M. Jeffords | 4.5 F | 0:53.40 | BEL |
| 1926 | Pandera | 2 | Linus McAtee | James G. Rowe Sr. | Harry Payne Whitney | 4.5 F | 0:52.60 | BEL |
| 1925 | Friar's Carse | 2 | Albert Johnson | Gwyn R. Tompkins | Glen Riddle Farm | 5 F | 0:59.20 | BEL |
| 1924 | Mother Goose | 2 | James H. Burke | Fred Hopkins | Harry Payne Whitney | 5 F | 0:58.00 | BEL |
| 1923 | Nellie Morse | 2 | Earl Sande | Albert B. Gordon | Bud Fisher | 5 F | 0:59.00 | BEL |
| 1922 | Cresta | 2 | George W. Penman | Fred Hopkins | Harry Payne Whitney | 5 F | 0:58.40 | BEL |
| 1921 | Prodigious | 2 | George Mountain | Matthew P. Brady | Joseph E. Davis | 5 F | 0:59.60 | BEL |
| 1920 | Prudery | 2 | Eddie Ambrose | James G. Rowe Sr. | Harry Payne Whitney | 5 F | 0:59.80 | BEL |
| 1919 | Bonnie Mary | 2 | Lavelle Ensor | William Hogan | Philip A. Clark | 5 F | 0:59.80 | BEL |
| 1918 | Elfin Queen | 2 | Andy Schuttinger | William H. Karrick | Harry K. Knapp | 5 F | 0:59.00 | BEL |
| 1917 | Rosie O'Grady | 2 | Frank Robinson | James G. Rowe Sr. | Harry Payne Whitney | 5 F | 1:01.00 | BEL |
| 1916 | Koh-I-Noor | 2 | Tommy Davies | William H. Karrick | Schuyler L. Parsons | 5 F | 1:00.00 | BEL |
| 1915 | Pleione | 2 | Walter Lilly | William Midgley | Gifford A. Cochran | 5 F | 0:58.00 | BEL |
| 1914 | Catalina | 2 | Joe Kederis | Richard C. Benson | James Butler | 5 F | 1:01.60 | BEL |
| 1913 | Flitaway | 2 | Tommy McTaggart | Louis Feustel | August Belmont Jr. | 5 F | 0:59.60 | BEL |
| 1912 | No races held due to the Hart–Agnew Law. | | | | | | | |
| 1911 | No races held due to the Hart–Agnew Law. | | | | | | | |
| 1910 | Housemaid | 2 | Vincent Powers | Raleigh Colston Jr. | Charles L. Harrison | 4.5 F | 0:53.60 | BEL |
| 1909 | Angerona | 2 | Guy Burns | A. J. Goldsborough | Samuel Doggett | 4.5 F | 0:52.60 | BEL |
| 1908 | Field Mouse | 2 | Joe Notter | John Whalen | August Belmont Jr. | 4.5 F | 0:52.80 | BEL |
| 1907 | Ella O'Neill | 2 | Joe Notter | Fred Burlew | Fred Burlew | 4.5 F | 0:54.00 | BEL |
| 1906 | Court Dress | 2 | LaVerne Sewell | James G. Rowe Sr. | James R. Keene | 4.5 F | 0:54.00 | BEL |
| 1905 | Tiptoe | 2 | George M. Odom | John Whalen | August Belmont Jr. | 4.5 F | 0:54.40 | BEL |
| 1904 | Incantation | 2 | Jack Martin | Thomas Welsh | Andrew Miller | 4.5 F | 0:53.75 | MP |
| 1903 | Ishlana | 2 | Grover Fuller | Edward W. Heffner | Lotos Stable | 4.5 F | 0:54.00 | MP |
| 1902 | Mamari | 2 | Samuel Doggett | William Heuston | Miles Finlen & Son | 4.5 F | 0:53.00 | MP |
| 1901 | Amicitia | 2 | Owen Mounce | John J. Hyland | August Belmont Jr. | 4.5 F | 0:55.25 | MP |
| 1900 | Anecdote | 2 | Willie Shaw | R. Wyndham Walden | R. W. Walden & Son | 4.5 F | 0:59.00 | MP |
| 1899 | Motley | 2 | Fred Taral | William Lakeland | William Lakeland | 4.5 F | 0:53.50 | MP |
| 1898 | High Degree | 2 | Tod Sloan | Edward Feakes | John Daly | 4 F | 0:49.00 | MP |
| 1897 | L'Alouette | 2 | Henry Griffin | James G. Rowe Sr. | Lewis S. & William P. Thompson | 4 F | 0:47.50 | MP |
| 1896 | Race not held | | | | | | | |
| 1895 | Woodvine | 2 | Henry Griffin | A. Jack Joyner | Blemton Stable | 6 F | 1:12.25 | MP |
| 1894 | Sabilla | 2 | Willie Simms | Charles S. Littlefield Jr. | Charles S. Littlefield Jr. | 6 F | 1:11.25 | MP |
| 1893 | Beldemere | 2 | Fred Taral | Edward Feakes | Preakness Stables | 6 F | | MP |
| 1892 | Miss Maud | 2 | Anthony Hamilton | Charles S. Littlefield Jr. | Boyle & Littlefield | 6 F | 1:13.50 | MP |
| 1891 | Yorkville Belle | 2 | | Matthew M. Allen | Frank A. Ehret | 6 F | 1:17.75 | MP |
| 1890 | La Tosca | 2 | Anthony Hamilton | James G. Rowe Sr. | August Belmont Sr. | 6 F | 1:17.00 | MP |
| 1889 | Tulla Blackburn | 2 | | | J. N. Mulholland | 6 F | 1:18.00 | MP |
