= Tidal Stakes =

- Location: Sheepshead Bay Race Track, Sheepshead Bay, Brooklyn, New York
- Inaugurated: 1880-1910
- Race type: Thoroughbred - Flat racing

Race information
- Distance: 1¼ miles (10 furlongs)
- Track: Dirt, left-handed
- Qualification: Three-years-old

The Tidal Stakes is a discontinued Thoroughbred horse race for three-year-olds run at the Sheepshead Bay Race Track in Sheepshead Bay, Brooklyn, New York from the 1880s through until the track closed in 1910. According to a 1901 report on the race by The New York Times, the Tidal Stakes was one of the famous fixtures of the Sheepshead Bay Spring meeting.

The inaugural running in 1881 was won by Luke Blackburn. Ridden by Jim McLaughlin and trained by James G. Rowe Sr., following the creation of the National Museum of Racing and Hall of Fame, horse, jockey and trainer would all be inducted. The final running of the Tidal Stakes took place on 1910 and was won by The Turk who recorded the fastest time in the history of the race at the mile and a quarter distance.

The most significant event in the history of the Tidal Stakes was Colin's win in 1908. The future Hall of Fame horse who would be ranked 15th in the 2000 Blood-Horse magazine List of the Top 100 U.S. Racehorses of the 20th Century, retired undefeated after his fifteenth career win in the Tidal.

The 1885 race resulted in a dead heat for first between James T. Williams Kentucky Derby winner Joe Cotton and Norman Kittson's colt Pardee.

== Records ==
Speed record:

- 1 ¼ miles: 2:03 4/5, The Turk (1910)
- 1 mile: 1:38 4/5, Watercolor (1901)

Most wins by a jockey:

- 8 - Jim McLaughlin (1880, 1881, 1882, 1883, 1885, 1886, 1887, 1889)

Most wins by a trainer:

- 8 - James G. Rowe Sr. (1880, 1881, 1882, 1883, 1905, 1907, 1908, 1909)

Most wins by an owner:

- 6 - Dwyer Brothers Stable (1880, 1881, 1882, 1883, 1886, 1887)

== Winners ==
Year	Winner	Jockey	Trainer	Owner	Dist. (Miles)	Time	Win$
1910	The Turk	Matt McGee	Richard O. Miller	Silver Brook Farm (William S. Fanshawe)	11/4 M	2:03.80	$1,450
1909	Hilarious	Richard Scoville	James G. Rowe Sr.	James R. Keene	11/4 M	2:05.00	$14,550
1908	Colin	Joe Notter	James G. Rowe Sr.	James R. Keene	11/4 M	2:04.00	$15,050
1907	Peter Pan	Walter Miller	James G. Rowe Sr.	James R. Keene	11/4 M	2:07.40	$15,050
1906	Accountant	Jack Martin	Matthew M. Allen	Diamond Jim Brady	11/4 M	2:10.00	$14,050
1905	Sysonby	Dave Nicol	James G. Rowe Sr.	James R. Keene	11/4 M	2:05.00	$14,550
1904	Ort Wells	Gene Hildebrand	Enoch Wishard	John A. Drake	11/4 M	2:06.00	$15,250
1903	Shorthose	William Haack	W. Fred Presgrave	Goughacres Stable (B. F. & T. C. Clyde)	11/4 M	2:12.20	$14,550
1902	Major Daingerfield	Willie Shaw	Matthew M. Allen	Frederick C. McLewee & Co.	11/4 M	2:09.60	$14,575
1901	Watercolor	Willie Shaw	Charles N. Littlefield	Charles N. Littlefield	1 M	1:38.80	$4,770
1900	McMeekin	Carl Mitchell	William M. Barrick	William M. Barrick	1 M	1:40.60	$4,900
1899	Filon d'Or	Patrick A. McCue	T. J. Healey	Richard T.Wilson Jr.	1 M	1:41.20	$4,660
1898	Handball	Robert Williams	Frank McCabe	Philip J. Dwyer	1 M	1:41.40	$3,770
1897	Buddha	Willie Simms	R. Wyndham Walden	R. C. Hall	1 M	1:42.20	$3,090
1896	Margrave	Henry Griffin	Byron McClelland	Blemton Stable	1 M	1:43.00	$5,690
1895	Keenan	Henry Griffin	John J. Hyland	John Daly & David Gideon	1 M	1:42.00	$6,380
1894	Dobbins	Willie Simms	Hardy Campbell Jr.	Richard Croker	1 M	1:40.00	$7,900
1893	Sir Walter	Samuel Doggett	Walter C. Rollins	Oneck Stable	1 M	1:43.00	$6.330
1892	Charade	Willie Simms	William R. Jones	William R. Jones	1 M	1:41.25	$6,690
1891	Portchester	Anthony Hamilton	Frank McCabe	Philip J. Dwyer & Sons	1 M	1:42.00	$5,770
1890	Burlington	Isaac Burns Murphy	Albert Cooper	Hough Brothers	1 M	1:45.00	$8,480
1889	Salvator	Jim McLaughlin	Matthew Byrnes	James B. A. Haggin	1 M	1:44.40	$7,000
1888	Defense	Fred Littlefield		M. Jordan	1 M	1:42.75	$7,720
1887	Hanover	Jim McLaughlin	Frank McCabe	Dwyer Brothers Stable	1 M	1:41.25	$6,740
1886	Inspector B	Jim McLaughlin	Frank McCabe	Dwyer Brothers Stable	1 M	1:46.75	$5,810
1885	Joe Cotton †	Jim McLaughlin	Abraham Perry	James T. Williams	1 M	1:44.25	$2,655
1884	Young Duke	Charlie Shauer	Matthew Byrnes	Pierre Lorillard IV	1 M	1:48.75	$4,180
1883	Barnes	Jim McLaughlin	James G. Rowe Sr.	Dwyer Brothers Stable	1 M	1:46.75	$4,320
1882	Runnymede	Jim McLaughlin	James G. Rowe Sr.	Dwyer Brothers Stable	1 M	1:43.75	$3,960
1881	Hindoo	Jim McLaughlin	James G. Rowe Sr.	Dwyer Brothers Stable	1 M	1:43.25	
1880	Luke Blackburn	Jim McLaughlin	James G. Rowe Sr.	Dwyer Brothers Stable	1 M	1:45.00	

- † 1885 dead heat for first between Joe Cotton and Pardee.
