= Belmont Futurity Stakes =

Futurity Stakes
- Class: Grade III
- Location: Belmont Park; Elmont, New York, United States
- Inaugurated: 1888
- Race type: Thoroughbred – Flat racing
- Website: www.nyra.com/belmont/

Race information
- Distance: 6 furlongs
- Surface: Turf
- Track: Left-handed
- Qualification: Two-year-olds
- Weight: Assigned
- Purse: $175,000

The Futurity Stakes, commonly referred to as the Belmont Futurity, is an American Thoroughbred horse race run annually in mid-September or October at Belmont Park in Elmont, New York, United States. Open to two-year-old horses, it is raced on turf over a distance of six furlongs.

The creation of James G. K. Lawrence, president of the Sheepshead Bay Race Track, the Futurity was originally run with the two-year-old offspring of mares which had been nominated before their birth. This rule remained in effect until 1957, when the race was opened to all two-year-old horses.

The Futurity was run as a turf race for the first time in 2018. It was added to the Breeders' Cup Challenge series for 2018 as a "Win and You're In" qualifier for the Juvenile Turf Sprint.

== Inaugural running ==
The first edition of the Futurity took place on Labor Day in 1888. The New York Times reported that one quarter of those in attendance were women. The richest race ever run in the United States to that time, the owners of winner Proctor Knott collected $41,675. Until 1956, this race had a larger purse than that of the Belmont Stakes.

=== Food consumption ===
The New York Times reported that attendance for the day of the inaugural running was at least the equal of the largest crowd to ever attend a race at the Sheepshead Bay facility and that the caterer sold the following food:

- 12,000 pounds of lobster
- 600 soft shell crabs
- 500 gallons of clam chowder
- 960 chickens
- 18,000 sandwiches
- 50 sets of ribs
- 60 short loins
- 20 [beef] hips and loins
- 25 Spring lambs
- 480 squabs
- 5 barrels of whiskey
- 40 cases of pepper whiskey
- 250 kegs of lager
- 380 cases of champagne
- 30 barrels of imported ginger ale
- 600 boxes of soda water, sarsaparilla, and other soft drinks

The Futurity Stakes was hosted by the Sheepshead Bay Race Track until the track's closure following a statewide ban on parimutuel betting through enactment of the Hart–Agnew Law by the New York Legislature. It was switched to the Saratoga Race Course for 1910 but was not raced for the next two years until the State Legislature lifted the ban. Held at Saratoga in 1913 and 1914, it was them moved to Belmont Park. In 1959 and 1960, plus from 1962 to 1967, the race was hosted by the Aqueduct Racetrack before returning to Belmont Park where it has since remained.

The race's counterpart on turf is the Laurel Futurity at Laurel Park Racecourse in Laurel, Maryland. Prior to the advent of the Breeders' Cup Juvenile, the Belmont Futurity was one of the United States' most important dirt races for two-year-olds. Some of the greatest Thoroughbreds in American racing history have won the race including Colin, Native Dancer, Man o' War and U.S. Triple Crown champions Affirmed, Secretariat, and Citation.

In 2001, the race had been scheduled to be run on September 16 but was canceled following the September 11, 2001 attacks.

Over the years the race has been contested at various distances:

- 6 furlongs: 1888–1891, 1902–1924, 2011–present;
- 1,263 yards and 1 foot: 1892–1901;
- Approximately 7 furlongs: 1925–1933;
- 6.5 furlongs: 1934–1975;
- 7 furlongs: 1976–1993; 2005–2009.
- 8 furlongs: 1994–2004.

== Records ==
Time record:

- 7 furlongs, dirt: 1:21.60 – Affirmed (1977)
- 6 1/2 furlongs, dirt: 1:14.40 – Native Dancer (1952) (World-Record Time)
- 6 furlongs, dirt: 1:09.49 – Blofeld (2014)
- 6 furlongs, turf: 1:08.07 – Four Wheel Drive (2019)

Most wins by an owner:

- 5 – James R. Keene (1893, 1899, 1907, 1908, 1909)
- 5 – George D. Widener Jr. (1923, 1930, 1950, 1957, 1966)

Most wins by a jockey:

- 6 – Eddie Arcaro (1940, 1946, 1950, 1954, 1956, 1959)

Most wins by a trainer:

- 9 – James G. Rowe Sr. (1890, 1897, 1899, 1907, 1908, 1909, 1913, 1915, 1921)

== Winners ==
Year	Winner	Jockey	Trainer	Owner	Dist. (Furlongs)	Time	Grade	Win$
2026	Good to Be King	Manuel Franco	George R. Arnold II	Cherry Valley Farm	6 F (t)	1:09.06	G3	$110,000
2025	Intricate Spirit	Joel Rosario	Miguel Clement	West Point Thoroughbreds, Madaket Stables, Kenneth G. Beitz & Gail P. Beitz	6 F (t)	1:07.98	G3	$175,000
2024	Mentee	John Velazquez	Todd Pletcher	Repole Stable Inc.	6 F (t)	1:08.82	G3	$96,250
2023	Book'em Danno	José Ortiz	Derek S. Ryan	Atlantic Stix Racing	6 F (d)	1:09.47	G3	$82,500
2022	Nagirroc	Manuel Franco	H. Graham Motion	Madaket Stables, Little Red Feather Racing & William Strauss	6 F (t)	1:09.36	G3	$82,500
2021	Slipstream	Joel Rosario	Christophe Clement	Jump Sucker Stable	6 F (t)	1:08.36	G3	$82,500
2020	Second Of July	Dylan Davis	Philip Gleaves	Bryan Hiliard	6 F (t)	1:09.33	G3	$55,000
2019	Four Wheel Drive	Irad Ortiz Jr.	Wesley A. Ward	Breeze Easy LLC	6 F ((t))	1:08.07	G3	$82,500
2018	Uncle Benny	Irad Ortiz Jr.	Jason Servis	Ara Aprahamian	6 F (t)	1:11.26	L	$90,000
2017	Engage	José Ortiz	Chad Brown	Woodford Racing LLC	6 F (d)	1:10.09	G3	$90,000
2016	Theory	Javier Castellano	Todd Pletcher	China Horse Club &WinStar Farm	6 F (d)	1:09.91	G3	$120,000
2015	Annual Report	Joe Bravo	Kiaran McLaughlin	Godolphin Racing	6 F (d)	1:09.82	G2	$120,000
2014	Blofeld	John Velazquez	Todd Pletcher	Glencrest Farm/JSM Equine	6 F (d)	1:09.49	G2	$120,000
2013	In Trouble	Joseph Rocco Jr.	Tony Dutrow	Team D	6 F (d)	1:09.64	G2	$120,000
2012	Overanalyze	John Velazquez	Todd Pletcher	Repole Stable	6 F (d)	1:11.46	G2	$120,000
2011	Jack's in the Deck	Joe Bravo	Robin L. Graham	Skeedattle Stable	6 F (d)	1:13.36	G2	$90,000
2010	Race not held							
2009	D' Funnybone	Edgar Prado	Richard E. Dutrow Jr.	Paul Pompa Jr.	7 F (d)	1:22.40	G2	$150,000
2008	Charitable Man	Alan Garcia	Kiaran McLaughlin	M/M William K. Warren	7 F (d)	1:24.30	G2	$150,000
2007	Tale of Ekati	Eibar Coa	Barclay Tagg	Charles E. Fipke	7 F (d)	1:22.33	G2	$150,000
2006	King of the Roxy	John Velazquez	Todd Pletcher	Team Valor	7 F (d)	1:24.00	G2	$150,000
2005	Private Vow	Jerry Bailey	Steve Asmussen	Mike McCarty	7 F (d)	1:24.00	G2	$180,000
2004	Park Avenue Ball	Javier Castellano	James T. Ryerson	Char-Mari Stable	8 F (d)	1:38.80	G2	$120,000
2003	Cuvee	Jerry Bailey	Steve Asmussen	Verne Winchell & Spendthrift Farm	8 F (d)	1:35.60	G1	$120,000
2002	Whywhywhy	Edgar Prado	Patrick Biancone	P. Biancone/Fabien Ouaki	8 F (d)	1:36.20	G1	$120,000
2001	Race not held							
2000	Burning Roma *	Rick Wilson	Anthony W. Dutrow	Harold Queen	8 F (d)	1:37.80	G1	$120,000
1999	Bevo	Joe Bravo	William Badgett Jr.	Peter Callahan	8 F (d)	1:36.00	G1	$90,000
1998	Lemon Drop Kid	John Velazquez	Scotty Schulhofer	Jeanne G. Vance	8 F (d)	1:37.40	G1	$90,000
1997	Grand Slam	Gary Stevens	D. Wayne Lukas	R. & C. Baker/W. Mack/D. Cornstein/M. Tabor/J. Magnier	8 F (d)	1:35.60	G1	$90,000
1996	Traitor	John Velazquez	Mary E. Eppler	Alfred Gwynne Vanderbilt Jr.	8 F (d)	1:35.20	G1	$90,000
1995	Maria's Mon	Robbie Davis	Richard Schosberg	Rosalind Rosenthal	8 F (d)	1:35.00	G1	$90,000
1994	Montreal Red	José A. Santos	Scotty Schulhofer	Vendome Stables	8 F (d)	1:36.20	G1	$66,180
1993	Holy Bull	Mike E. Smith	Warren A. Croll Jr.	Warren A. Croll Jr.	7 F (d)	1:23.20	G1	$69,360
1992	Strolling Along	Chris Antley	C. R. McGaughey III	Ogden Phipps	7 F (d)	1:23.60	G1	$72,120
1991	Agincourt	Jorge Chavez	Nick Zito	Robert Perez	7 F (d)	1:23.80	G1	$73,140
1990	Eastern Echo	Jerry Bailey	MacKenzie Miller	Rokeby Stables	7 F (d)	1:22.40	G1	$69,360
1989	Senor Pete	José A. Santos	Scotty Schulhofer	Michael G. Rutherford	7 F (d)	1:23.20	G1	$75,360
1988	Trapp Mountain	Ángel Cordero Jr.	George R. Arnold II	Loblolly Stable	7 F (d)	1:23.80	G1	$74,280
1987	Forty Niner	Eddie Maple	Woody Stephens	Claiborne Farm	7 F (d)	1:22.60	G1	$80,100
1986	Gulch	Ángel Cordero Jr.	LeRoy Jolley	Peter M. Brant	7 F (d)	1:22.20	G1	$82,920
1985	Ogygian	Walter Guerra	Jan H. Nerud	Tartan Farms	7 F (d)	1:22.40	G1	$90,600
1984	Spectacular Love	Laffit Pincay Jr.	Laz Barrera	Dolly Green	7 F (d)	1:23.20	G1	$105,900
1983	Swale	Eddie Maple	Woody Stephens	Claiborne Farm	7 F (d)	1:24.00	G1	$72,915
1982	Copelan	Jerry D. Bailey	Michael Griffin	Fred W. Hooper	7 F (d)	1:24.20	G1	$97,110
1981	Irish Martini	Jorge Velásquez	Richard DeStasio	Seymour Cohen	7 F (d)	1:24.40	G1	$103,605
1980	Tap Shoes	Ruben Hernandez	Howard M. Tesher	Leone J. Peters	7 F (d)	1:23.80	G1	$85,605
1979	Rockhill Native	John Oldham	Herbert K. Stevens	Harry A. Oak	7 F (d)	1:22.00	G1	$90,150
1978	Crested Wave †	Jean Cruguet	Ross Fenstermaker	Fred W. Hooper	7 F (d)	1:24.00	G1	$75,600
1977	Affirmed	Steve Cauthen	Laz Barrera	Harbor View Farm	7 F (d)	1:21.60	G1	$63,570
1976	For The Moment	Eddie Maple	LeRoy Jolley	Gerald Robins	7 F (d)	1:23.20	G1	$67,353
1975	Soy Numero Uno	Jacinto Vásquez	Homer C. Pardue	Joseph R. Straus Sr.	6.5 F (d)	1:17.80	G1	$66,408
1974	Just The Time	Marco Castaneda	John P. Campo	Buckland Farm	6.5 F (d)	1:16.40	G1	$66,801
1973	Wedge Shot	Jacinto Vásquez	Charles R. Parke	Fred W. Hooper	6.5 F (d)	1:17.00	G1	$82,230
1972	Secretariat	Ron Turcotte	Lucien Laurin	Meadow Stable	6.5 F (d)	1:16.40		$82,320
1971	Riva Ridge	Ron Turcotte	Lucien Laurin	Meadow Stud	6.5 F (d)	1:16.60		$87,636
1970	Salem	John L. Rotz	Edward L. Holton	Christiana Stable	6.5 F (d)	1:16.80		$99,333
1969	High Echelon	John L. Rotz	Hirsch Jacobs	Ethel D. Jacobs	6.5 F (d)	1:18.40		$92,807
1968	Top Knight	Manuel Ycaza	Raymond Metcalf	Steven B. Wilson	6.5 F (d)	1:16.20		$88,283
1967	Captain's Gig	Bill Shoemaker	William W. Stephens	Cain Hoy Stable	6.5 F (d)	1:15.80		$90,495
1966	Bold Hour	John L. Rotz	Bert Mulholland	George D. Widener Jr.	6.5 F (d)	1:17.60		$91,084
1965	Priceless Gem	Walter Blum	Hirsch Jacobs	Ethel D. Jacobs	6.5 F (d)	1:17.20		$93,827
1964	Bold Lad	Braulio Baeza	William C. Winfrey	Wheatley Stable	6.5 F (d)	1:16.00		$85,566
1963	Bupers	Avelino Gomez	Buddy Jacobson	Marion R. Frankel	6.5 F (d)	1:17.40		$90,974
1962	Never Bend	Bill Shoemaker	Woody Stephens	Cain Hoy Stable	6.5 F (d)	1:17.20		$94,348
1961	Cyane	Manuel Ycaza	Henry S. Clark	Christiana Stable	6.5 F (d)	1:17.20		$85,650
1960	Little Tumbler	Ray Broussard	William R. Mitchell	Meadowbrook Stable	6.5 F (d)	1:16.60		$87,456
1959	Weatherwise	Eddie Arcaro	John M. Gaver Sr.	Greentree Stable	6.5 F (d)	1:18.60		$88,470
1958	Intentionally	Bill Shoemaker	Edward Kelly Sr.	Brookfield Farm	6.5 F (d)	1:16.20		$80,690
1957	Jester	Paul J. Bailey	Bert Mulholland	George D. Widener Jr.	6.5 F (d)	1:16.20		$81,005
1956	Bold Ruler	Eddie Arcaro	James E. Fitzsimmons	Wheatley Stable	6.5 F (d)	1:15.20		$91,145
1955	Nail	Hedley Woodhouse	George P. Odom	Josephine P. Widener	6.5 F (d)	1:16.80		$100,425
1954	Nashua	Eddie Arcaro	James E. Fitzsimmons	Belair Stud	6.5 F (d)	1:15.60		$88,015
1953	Porterhouse	William Boland	Charlie Whittingham	Llangollen Farm	6.5 F (d)	1:16.00		$92,875
1952	Native Dancer	Eric Guerin	William C. Winfrey	Alfred G. Vanderbilt II	6.5 F (d)	1:14.40		$82,845
1951	Tom Fool	Ted Atkinson	John M. Gaver Sr.	Greentree Stable	6.5 F (d)	1:17.20		$86,710
1950	Battlefield	Eddie Arcaro	Bert Mulholland	George D. Widener Jr.	6.5 F (d)	1:15.40		$81,715
1949	Guillotine	Ted Atkinson	John M. Gaver Sr.	Greentree Stable	6.5 F (d)	1:15.60		$87,585
1948	Blue Peter	Eric Guerin	Andy Schuttinger	Joseph M. Roebling	6.5 F (d)	1:14.60		$88,410
1947	Citation	Albert Snider	Horace A. Jones	Calumet Farm	6.5 F (d)	1:15.80		$78,430
1946	First Flight	Eddie Arcaro	Sylvester Veitch	C. V. Whitney	6.5 F (d)	1:15.20		$73,350
1945	Star Pilot	Arnold Kirkland	Tom Smith	Maine Chance Farm	6.5 F (d)	1:17.20		$52,940
1944	Pavot	George Woolf	Oscar White	Walter M. Jeffords Sr.	6.5 F (d)	1:15.20		$53,890
1943	Occupy	George Woolf	Burley Parke	John Marsch	6.5 F (d)	1:17.80		$55,635
1942	Occupation	George Woolf	Burley Parke	John Marsch	6.5 F (d)	1:15.20		$57,890
1941	Some Chance	Wendell Eads	Ben A. Jones	Calumet Farm	6.5 F (d)	1:16.80		$57,900
1940	Our Boots	Eddie Arcaro	Steve Judge	Woodvale Farm	6.5 F (d)	1:15.60		$65,800
1939	Bimelech	Fred A. Smith	William A. Hurley	Edward R. Bradley	6.5 F (d)	1:16.80		$57,710
1938	Porter's Mite	Basil James	Ted Horning	William E. Boeing	6.5 F (d)	1:16.80		$57,045
1937	Menow	Charley Kurtsinger	Duval A. Headley	Hal Price Headley	6.5 F (d)	1:15.20		$56,800
1936	Pompoon	Harry Richards	Cyrus Field Clark	Jerome H. Louchheim	6.5 F (d)	1:16.40		$55,630
1935	Tintagel	Silvio Coucci	George M. Odom	Marshall Field III	6.5 F (d)	1:17.40		$66,450
1934	Chance Sun	Wayne D. Wright	Peter Coyne	Joseph E. Widener	6.5 F (d)	1:17.60		$77,510
1933	Singing Wood	Robert Jones	James W. Healy	Liz Whitney	6.75 F (d)	1:17.60		$88,700
1932	Kerry Patch	Pete Walls	Joseph A. Notter	Lee Rosenberg	6.75 F (d)	1:24.40		$88,690
1931	Top Flight	Raymond Workman	Thomas J. Healey	C. V. Whitney	6.75 F (d)	1:21.00		$94,780
1930	Jamestown	Linus McAtee	A. Jack Joyner	George D. Widener Jr.	6.75 F (d)	1:20.60		$99,600
1929	Whichone	Raymond Workman	James G. Rowe Jr.	Harry P. Whitney	6.75 F (d)	1:19.60		$105,730
1928	High Strung	Linus McAtee	George M. Odom	Marshall Field III	6.75 F (d)	1:19.00		$97,990
1927	Anita Peabody	Chick Lang	Bert S. Michell	Fannie Hertz	6.75 F (d)	1:21.80		$91,790
1926	Scapa Flow	Laverne Fator	Scott P. Harlan	Walter M. Jeffords Sr.	6.75 F (d)	1:22.00		$65,980
1925	Pompey	Laverne Fator	William H. Karrick	Shoshone Stable	6.75 F (d)	1:23.00		$58,480
1924	Mother Goose	Linus McAtee	Fred Hopkins	Harry P. Whitney	6 F (d)	1:10.80		$65,730
1923	St. James	Thomas McTaggart	A. Jack Joyner	George D. Widener Jr.	6 F (d)	1:10.40		$64,810
1922	Sally's Alley	Albert Johnson	Eugene Wayland	Willis Sharpe Kilmer	6 F (d)	1:11.00		$47,550
1921	Bunting	Frank Coltiletti	James G. Rowe Sr.	Harry P. Whitney	6 F (d)	1:11.40		$39,700
1920	Step Lightly	Frank Keogh	Eugene Wayland	Walter J. Salmon Sr.	6 F (d)	1:12.20		$35,870
1919	Man o' War	Johnny Loftus	Louis Feustel	Glen Riddle Farm	6 F (d)	1:11.60		$26,650
1918	Dunboyne	Andy Schuttinger	William Hogan	Philip A. Clark	6 F (d)	1:12.80		$23,360
1917	Papp	Lawrence Allen	Max Hirsch	George W. Loft	6 F (d)	1:12.00		$15,600
1916	Campfire	John McTaggart	Thomas J. Healey	Richard T. Wilson Jr.	6 F (d)	1:13.80		$17,340
1915	Thunderer	Joe Notter	James G. Rowe Sr.	Lewis S. Thompson	6 F (d)	1:11.80		$16,590
1914	Trojan	Charles Burlingame	Stephen J. Lawler	Quincy Stable (James Francis Johnson)	6 F (d)	1:16.80		$16,010
1913	Pennant	Charles Borel	James G. Rowe Sr.	Harry P. Whitney	6 F (d)	1:15.00		$15,060
1912	No races held due to the Hart–Agnew Law.							
1911	No races held due to the Hart–Agnew Law.							
1910	Novelty	Cal Shilling	Sam Hildreth	Sam Hildreth	6 F (d)	1:12.20		$25,360
1909	Sweep	James Butwell	James G. Rowe Sr.	James R. Keene	6 F (d)	1:11.80		$24,100
1908	Maskette	Joe Notter	James G. Rowe Sr.	James R. Keene	6 F (d)	1:11.20		$26,110
1907	Colin	Walter Miller	James G. Rowe Sr.	James R. Keene	6 F (d)	1:11.20		$26,640
1906	Electioneer	Willie Shaw	William Lakeland	William Lakeland	6 F (d)	1:13.60		$36,880
1905	Ormondale	Arthur Redfern	Thomas Welsh	Ormondale Stable (William O'Brien Macdonough)	6 F (d)	1:11.80		$32,960
1904	Artful	Gene Hildebrand	John W. Rogers	H. B. Duryea	6 F (d)	1:11.80		$40,830
1903	Hamburg Belle	Grover Fuller	A. Jack Joyner	Sydney Paget	6 F (d)	1:13.00		$36,600
1902	Savable	Lucien Lyne	Enoch Wishard	John A. Drake	6 F (d)	1:14.00		$44,500
1901	Yankee	Winfield O'Connor	John E. Madden	John E. Madden	5.75 F (d)	1:09.20		$36,850
1900	Ballyhoo Bey	Tod Sloan	John E. Madden	William C. Whitney	5.75 F (d)	1:10.00		$33,580
1899	Chacornac	Henry Spencer	James G. Rowe Sr.	James R. Keene	5.75 F (d)	1:10.40		$30,630
1898	Martimas	Harry Lewis	Edward Whyte	William Hendrie	5.75 F (d)	1:12.40		$36,610
1897	L'Alouette	Richard Clawson	James G. Rowe Sr.	Lewis S. Thompson & William P. Thompson	5.75 F (d)	1:11.00		$34,290
1896	Ogden	Frank Turbiville	John Campbell	Marcus Daly	5.75 F (d)	1:10.00		$43,790
1895	Requital	Henry Griffin	John J. Hyland	David Gideon	5.75 F (d)	1:11.40		$53,190
1894	The Butterflies	Henry Griffin	John J. Hyland	David Gideon & John Daly	5.75 F (d)	1:11.00		$48,710
1893	Domino	Fred Taral	William Lakeland	James & Foxhall Keene	5.75 F (d)	1:12.80		$48,855
1892	Morello	William Hayward	Frank Van Ness	William M. Singerly	5.75 F (d)	1:12.20		$40,450
1891	His Highness	Jim McLaughlin	John J. Hyland	David Gideon	6 F (d)	1:15.20		$61,675
1890	Potomac	Anthony Hamilton	James G. Rowe Sr.	August Belmont Sr.	6 F (d)	1:14.20		$67,675
1889	Chaos	Fred Day	Charles Leighton	William L. Scott	6 F (d)	1:16.80		$54,500
1888	Proctor Knott	Shelby Barnes	Samuel W. Bryant	George W. Scoggan & Samuel W. Bryant	6 F (d)	1:15.20		$40,900

- A "Ŧ" designates that all races were cancelled due to the September 11, 2001 attacks on New York.
- * † In 1978, Fuzzbuster finished first, but was disqualified as was City Zip in 2000.
