= Foam Stakes =

- Class: Discontinued stakes
- Location: Sheepshead Bay Race Track; Brooklyn, New York, United States
- Inaugurated: 1880–1910
- Race type: Thoroughbred – Flat racing

Race information
- Distance: 5 furlongs (0.63 mi)
- Surface: Dirt
- Track: left-handed
- Qualification: Two-year-olds

The Foam Stakes was an American Thoroughbred horse race run annually from 1880 through 1910 at Sheepshead Bay Race Track in Sheepshead Bay, Brooklyn, New York. An event for two-year-old horses of either sex, the race was run on dirt over a distance of five furlongs with the exception of 1896 when it was for three-year-old fillies at one mile (8 furlongs). The inaugural running took place on June 19, 1880 and was won by Spinaway for whom the prestigious Grade 1 Spinaway Stakes at Saratoga Race Course was named. The final running took place on June 21, 1910 and was won by Royal Meteor for the Newcastle Stable racing partnership headed by Life magazine publisher Andrew Miller. The Foam was the only stakes race on the card.

== The end of a race and of a racetrack ==
On June 11, 1908, the Republican controlled New York Legislature under Governor Charles Evans Hughes passed the Hart–Agnew anti-betting legislation. The owners of Sheepshead Bay Race Track, and other racing facilities in New York State, struggled to stay in business without income from betting. Racetrack operators had no choice but to drastically reduce the purse money being paid out which resulted in the Foam Stakes offering a purse in 1909 that was less than one-eight of what it had been in earlier years. These small purses made horse racing unprofitable and impossible for even the most successful horse owners to continue in business. As such, for the 1910 racing season management of the Sheepshead Bay facility dropped some of its minor stakes races and used the purse money to bolster more important events.

In spite of strong opposition by prominent owners such as August Belmont, Jr. and Harry Payne Whitney, reform legislators were not happy when they learned that betting was still going on at racetracks between individuals and they had further restrictive legislation passed by the New York Legislature in 1910. Recorded as the Executive Liability Act, the legislation made it possible for racetrack owners and members of its board of directors to be fined and imprisoned if anyone was found betting, even privately, anywhere on their premises. After a 1911 amendment to the law to limit the liability of owners and directors was defeated, every racetrack in New York State shut down. As a result, the Foam Stakes was not run in 1911 and 1912.

Owners, whose horses of racing age had nowhere to go, began sending them, their trainers and their jockeys to race in England and France. Many horses ended their racing careers there and a number remained to become an important part of the European horse breeding industry. Thoroughbred Times reported that more than 1,500 American horses were sent overseas between 1908 and 1913 and of them at least 24 were either past, present, or future Champions. When a February 21, 1913 ruling by the New York Supreme Court, Appellate Division Court saw horse racing return in 1913 it was too late for the Sheepshead Bay horse racing facility and it never reopened.

== Records ==
Speed record:

- 0:59.40 @ 5 furlongs : Flyback (1904)

Most wins by a jockey:

- 3 – Edward Garrison (1887, 1889, 1892)

Most wins by a trainer:

- 3 – R. Wyndham Walden (1880, 1887, 1890)

Most wins by an owner:

- 2 – William Lawrence Scott (1884, 1885)
- 2 – Pierre Lorillard IV (1881, 1882)
- 2 – Dwyer Brothers Stable (1883, 1886)

== Winners ==
Year	Winner	Age	Jockey	Trainer	Owner	Dist. (Miles)	Time	Win$
1910	Royal Meteor	2	Guy Garner	Thomas Welsh	Newcastle Stable	5 F	1:00.60	$2,330
1909	Kingship	2	Vincent Powers	Matthew Feakes	Lily A. Livingston	5 F	1:01.40	$380
1908	Mediant	2	Dalton McCarthy	John Huggins	Herman B. Duryea	5 F	1:00.40	$4,100
1907	Cohort	2	R. Lowe	William H. Karrick	Oneck Stable	5 F	1:00.60	$5,320
1906	Oran	2	Walter Miller	Thomas Welsh	Ormondale Stable (William O'Brien Macdonough)	5 F	1:00.60	$4,775
1905	Jacobite	2	Willie Davis	A. Jack Joyner	Sydney Paget	5 F	1:00.20	$3,890
1904	Flyback	2	Gene Hildebrand	John E. Madden	John E. Madden	5 F	0:59.40	$4,330
1903	Inflexible	2	Arthur Redfern	John W. Rogers	William Collins Whitney	5 F	1:01.60	$5,895
1902	Sir Voorhies	2	Otto Wonderly	Charles Littlefield Jr.	James B. A. Haggin	5 F	1:00.80	$4,055
1901	Francesco	2	Willie Shaw	Thomas Welsh	Julius Fleischmann	5 F	1:00.20	$3,280
1900	Dublin	2	Patrick A. McCue	Sam Hildreth	Sam Hildreth	5 F	1:01.00	$3,445
1899	Mesmerist	2	Winfield O'Connor	Julius J. Bauer	Bromley & Co. (Joseph E. Bromley & Arthur Featherstone)	5 F	1:02.00	$3,560
1898	Ahom	2	Tod Sloan	William C. Smith	George E. Smith	5 F	1:01.60	$3,085
1897	Kitefoot	2	John J. McCafferty	John J. McCafferty	John J. McCafferty	5 F	1:01.40	$2,900
1896	Intermission	3	Tod Sloan	Henry Harris	John E. McDonald	8 F	1:43.40	$1,400
1895	Handspring	2	Samuel Doggett	Frank McCabe	Philip J. Dwyer	5 F	1:02.00	$4,475
1894	The Coon	2	Samuel Doggett	Walter C. Rollins	Oneck Stable	5 F	1:01.40	$4,000
1893	Dobbins	2	John Lamley	Hardy Campbell Jr.	Richard Croker	5 F	1:02.40	$4,600
1892	Lady Violet	2	Edward Garrison	A. Jack Joyner	August Belmont Jr.	5 F	1:02.00	$3,850
1891	Merry Monarch	2	Marty Bergen	John Hyland	David Gideon	5 F	1:01.80	$4,175
1890	Ambulance	2	Fred Littlefield	R. Wyndham Walden	John A., Alfred H. & Dave H. Morris	5 F	1:01.20	$4,175
1889	St. Carlo	2	Edward Garrison	James G. Rowe Sr.	August Belmont Sr.	5 F	1:01.00	$4,800
1888	Buddhist	2	Isaac Burns Murphy	John W. Rogers	Samuel S. Brown	5 F	1:03.00	$3,675
1887	Omaha	2	Edward Garrison	R. Wyndham Walden	R. Wyndham Walden	5 F	1:03.00	$3,800
1886	Tremont	2	Jim McLaughlin	Frank McCabe	Dwyer Brothers Stable	5 F	1:04.50	$2,800
1885	Quito	2	Isaac E. Lewis	Byron McClelland	William Lawrence Scott	5 F	1:03.75	$2,425
1884	Florio	2	Isaac E. Lewis	Byron McClelland	William Lawrence Scott	5 F	1:04.00	$3,025
1883	Burton	2	Jim McLaughlin	James G. Rowe Sr.	Dwyer Brothers Stable	5 F	1:03.50	$2,875
1882	Parthenia	2	Charles Shauer	Matthew Bynes	Pierre Lorillard IV	5 F	1:03.75	
1881	Gerald	2	George Barbee	Matthew Bynes	Pierre Lorillard IV	5 F	1:02.50	$2,500
1880	Spinaway	2	Lloyd Hughes	R. Wyndham Walden	George L. Lorillard	5 F	1:04.00	
