= Omnium Handicap =

Former American horse race

- Class: Discontinued stakes
- Location: Sheepshead Bay Race Track; Sheepshead Bay, Brooklyn, New York
- Inaugurated: 1885–1909
- Race type: Thoroughbred – Flat racing

Race information
- Distance: 1 1/8 miles (9 furlongs)
- Surface: Dirt
- Track: left-handed
- Qualification: Three-years-old and up

The Omnium Handicap was an American Thoroughbred horse race run annually at Sheepshead Bay Race Track in Sheepshead Bay, Brooklyn, New York from 1885 thru 1909. A race for horses of either sex age three and older, it was run on dirt over a distance of a mile and one-eighth. The Omnium was the third and last of the track's autumn serials, coming after the Fall Handicap at 6½ furlongs and the Ocean Handicap at one mile.

== Historical notes ==
New to racing in New York, a relatively unknown western-based horse named Joquita won the inaugural running. Lightly regarded by the betting public, Joquita was sent off at odds of 20–1. However, once those odds were telegraphed across the country, a group of western people each quietly put down what the Daily Racing Form called an "enormous sum of money" with bookmakers. The Joquita "killing" would be talked about for years to come.

The final running of the Omnium was won by King James, owned and trained by future U.S. Racing Hall of Fame inductee Sam Hildreth. King James's performance for the year would earn him recognition as the American Champion Handicap Horse of 1909.

=== New track records ===
In 1903 His Eminence, winner of the 1901 Kentucky Derby, set a new Sheepshead Bay track record as did Firestone in winning the 1908 Omnium Handicap.

== Demise of the Omnium Handicap ==
After years of uncertainty, on June 11, 1908, the Republican controlled New York Legislature under Governor Charles Evans Hughes passed the Hart–Agnew anti-betting legislation with penalties allowing for fines and up to a year in prison. The owners of Sheepshead Bay Race Track, and other racing facilities in New York State, struggled to stay in business without income from betting. Racetrack operators had no choice but to drastically reduce the purse money being paid out which resulted in the Omnium Handicap offering a purse in 1909 that was one-third of what it had been in earlier years. These small purses made horse racing highly unprofitable and impossible for even the most successful horse owners to continue in business. As such, for the 1910 racing season management of the Sheepshead Bay facility dropped some of its less important stakes races and used the purse money to bolster its most important events. The effect was to place the Omnium Handicap on hiatus. Further restrictive legislation was passed by the New York Legislature in 1910 which deepened the financial crisis for track operators and after a 1911 amendment to the law to limit the liability of owners and directors was defeated every racetrack in New York State shut down. Owners, whose horses of racing age had nowhere to go, began sending them, their trainers and their jockeys to race in England and France. Many horses ended their racing careers there, and a number remained to become an important part of the European horse breeding industry. Thoroughbred Times reported that more than 1,500 American horses were sent overseas between 1908 and 1913 and of them at least 24 were either past, present, or future Champions. When a February 21, 1913 ruling by the New York Supreme Court, Appellate Division Court saw horse racing return in 1913 it was too late for the Sheepshead Bay horse racing facility and it never reopened.

== Records ==
Speed record:

- 1:51 2/5 Firestone (1908) NTR

Most wins:

- 2 – Proper (1905, 1906)

Most wins by a jockey:

- 2 – Willie Simms (1895, 1897)
- 2 – Willie Shaw (1899, 1902)

== Winners ==
Year	Winner	Age	Jockey	Trainer	Owner	Dist. (Miles)	Time	Win US$
1909	King James	4	James Butwell	Sam Hildreth	Sam Hildreth	11/8 M	1:52.00	$1,050
1908	Firestone	3	James Butler Jr.	Henry E. Rowell	Thomas H. Williams	11/8 M	1:51.40	$1,425
1907	Brookdale Nymph	4	Joe Notter	John W. Rogers	Harry Payne Whitney	11/8 M	1:52.40	$3,280
1906	Proper	6	Leroy Williams	Walter B. Jennings	Walter B. Jennings	11/8 M	1:54.80	$3,720
1905	Proper	5	Gene Hildebrand	Walter B. Jennings	Walter B. Jennings	11/8 M	1:53.20	$3,865
1904	Colonial Girl	5	Willie Davis	Charles E. Rowe	Charles E. Rowe	11/8 M	1:53.60	$3,580
1903	His Eminence	5	W. A. Higgins	George Hill	Fred Gebhard	11/8 M	1:52.20	$2,160
1902	Colonel Bill	3	Willie Shaw	James H. McCormick	Louis V. Bell	11/8 M	1:52.80	$1,950
1901	Herbert	4	Lewis Smith	Walter C. Rollins	Walter C. Rollins	11/8 M	1:58.20	$1,950
1900	Potente	5	Patrick A. McCue	John J. McCafferty	John J. McCafferty	11/8 M	1:52.80	$1,950
1899	Maxine	5	Willie Shaw	Abraham J. Stemler	Abraham J. Stemler	11/8 M	1:56.00	$1,450
1898	Algol	4	Tommy Burns	George Walker	John W. Schorr & Son	11/8 M	1:54.20	$1,450
1897	Ben Brush	4	Willie Simms	Hardy Campbell Jr.	Michael F. Dwyer	11/8 M	1:55.00	$1,425
1896	Buck Massie	4	John Hill	J. Healy	James M. Murphy	11/8 M	1:54.40	$1,500
1895	Clifford	5	Willie Simms	John W. Rogers	H. Eugene Leigh	11/8 M	1:53.20	$1,425
1894	Roche	4	Henry Griffin	William Donohue	William Donohue	11/8 M	1:56.40	$1,950
1893	Sir Walter	3	Samuel Doggett	Walter C. Rollins	Oneck Stable	11/8 M	1:55.80	$1,870
1892	Aloha	7	John J. McCafferty	John J. McCafferty	John J. McCafferty	11/8 M	1:56.00	$2,005
1891	Mabel Glenn	4	Alec Covington		A. Thompson	11/8 M	1:58.00	$1,650
1890	Tournament	3	William Hayward	Matthew M. Allen	George Hearst	11/8 M	1:56.40	$2,030
1889	Firenze	4	Jim McLaughlin	Matthew Byrnes	James Ben Ali Haggin	11/8 M	1:54.60	$2,525
1888	Climax	5	Robert "Tiny" Williams		Lamasney Brothers	11/8 M	1:55.40	$1,912
1887	Kaloolah	4	P. Godfrey	James Murphy	J. D. Morrissey	11/8 M	1:55.25	$2,122
1886	Jim Douglas	8	William Farley			11/8 M	1:55.50	$2,434
1885	Joquita	4	George Covington		William Mulkey	11/8 M	1:58.00	$2,206
