= Samuel Doggett =

American jockey

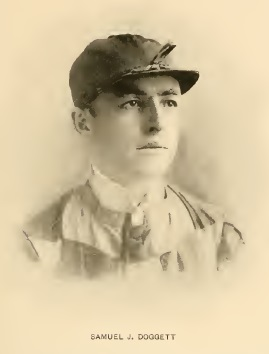

Personal information
- Born: November 29, 1871 Oakwood, Illinois; United States
- Died: October 4, 1935 (aged 63) Brooklyn, New York; United States
- Resting place: Holy Cross Cemetery, Brooklyn
- Occupation: Jockey/Trainer/Owner

Horse racing career
- Sport: Horse racing

Major racing wins
- As a jockey: Autumn Stakes (1891, 1894); Golden Rod Stakes (1891, 1895); Champagne Stakes (1892); Culver Handicap (1892, 1893); Hyde Park Stakes (1892); Tremont Stakes (1892, 1895, 1902); Flatbush Stakes (1893, 1895); Mermaid Stakes (1893); Metropolitan Handicap (1893); Omnium Handicap (1893); Tidal Stakes (1893); Autumn Stakes (1894); Double Event Stakes (part 2) (1894, 1895); Foam Stakes (1894,1895); Long Island Handicap (1894); Spindrift Stakes (1894); Vernal Stakes (1893, 1894, 1895, 1898); June Stakes (1894); Belles Stakes (1895); Carter Handicap (1895, 1896); Dolphin Stakes (1895); Double Event Stakes (part 1) (1895); Great Eastern Handicap (1895); Parkway Handicap (1895); Brighton Handicap (1896); California Oaks (1896); Brooklyn Derby (1896); Municipal Handicap (1896); Russet Handicap (1896); Hudson Stakes (1897); Juvenile Stakes (1897); Fashion Stakes (1902)

Significant horses
- Charade, Clifford, Deerslayer, Sir Walter, Dobbins, Don Alonzo, Henry of Navarre, Handspring

Samuel Jesse Doggett (November 29, 1871 - October 4, 1935) was one of the leading American Thoroughbred horse racing jockeys of the 1890s and a founding director of the Horsemen's Protective Association who went on to train and own racehorses.

== Riding career ==
Samuel Doggett began his career in horse racing as an exercise boy and began riding competitively as a fifteen-year-old in 1887 in County Fair races. By the early 1890s his success at the big racetracks led to his hiring by major stable trainers including Matthew Allen, John Hyland, John Rogers and Walter Rollins.

In 1895, the Boston Post reported he was among the elite jockeys and was earning in excess of $10,000 a year. (US$300,522 in 2018) By the early years of the 1900s American jockeys were in great demand by owners throughout Europe and in 1901 Doggett joined Fred Taral in signing a lucrative contract to ride in Austria. Samuel Dogget's biography in the 1898 edition of The American Turf reported that "Throughout his career, Doggett has been noted for temperance, attention to business, and frugality" and that his home was "one of the most beautiful places in Gravesend, Brooklyn".

=== The American Classics ===
Samuel Doggett rode Dr. Rice in the June 10, 1893 Belmont Stakes, marking the first of three appearances in races that would become part of the U.S. Triple Crown series. In a field of five runners, he was aboard the favorite Dr. Rice, who had won the Withers Stakes, but it would be African-American jockey Willie Simms aboard Commanche who won by a head.

On June 2, 1896, Samuel Doggett rode Del Paso II in the 1896 Belmont Stakes for the Marcus Daly stable, finishing fourth and last to August Belmont Jr.'s colt, Hastings. In a year when the Preakness Stakes was run four days after the Belmont Stakes, on June 6, 1896, Dodgett rode Hamilton II to a second second-place finish in the 1896 Preakness Stakes behind winner Margrave. Still active as an owner, he hired top trainer A. J. Goldsborough and with Canadian jockey Guy Burns aboard Doggett's filly Angerona they won the 1909 Fashion Stakes at Belmont Park.

== Training career ==
In 1903 Samuel Doggett was no longer riding but had begun to train a small stable of four horses for himself then for other owners. In February 1907 he announced his retirement from racing and relocated to Denver, Colorado to go into the dry goods business with his brother.
