= Vernal Stakes =

- Class: Discontinued stakes
- Location: Sheepshead Bay Race Track; Sheepshead Bay, Brooklyn, New York, United States
- Inaugurated: 1892–1910
- Race type: Thoroughbred – Flat racing

Race information
- Distance: 5 furlongs (0.63 mi)
- Surface: Dirt
- Track: left-handed
- Qualification: Two-year-old fillies

The Vernal Stakes was an American Thoroughbred horse race for two-year-old fillies held annually at Sheepshead Bay Race Track in Sheepshead Bay, Brooklyn, New York. A race on dirt, in its first two editions of 1892 and 1893 the race was run at a distance of six furlongs and was open to horses of either sex. In 1894 it was changed to an event exclusively for fillies and was set at a distance of five furlongs.

== Future Champions who won the Vernal Stakes ==
The 1897 winner Briar Sweet was owned and trained by Walter Jennings. She would go on to be named American Champion Three-Year-Old Filly of 1898.

In 1899 Killashandra won the Vernal Stakes and the following year would also be named American Champion Three-Year-Old Filly. Killashandra was owned by William Whitney but raced under the name of stable manager Sydney Paget.

The 1903 edition of the Vernal Stakes was won by the great Beldame who would go on to be named American Horse of the Year in 1904 and following its formation, a U. S. Racing Hall of Fame inductee. The Beldame Stakes at Belmont Park is named in her honor.

The 1908 running was won by Ocean Bound who was owned by Woodford Clay, a member of Kentucky's prominent Clay family. Ocean Bound would be named American Champion Two-Year-Old Filly for 1908 and the American Champion Three-Year-Old Filly of 1909.

The final running of the Vernal Stakes in 1910 was won by Bashti. The filly was owned by the Newcastle Stable racing and breeding partnership headed by Life magazine co-founder Andrew Miller and which partnership also included trainer Thomas Welsh. A few weeks after Bashti's win she would be sold at auction for a record price to Harry Payne Whitney who shipped her to England to race as a three-year-old before eventually returning her to stand as a broodmare at his Kentucky breeding farm. Bashti would be named American Champion Two-Year-Old Filly.

== The end of a race and of a racetrack ==
On June 11, 1908, the Republican controlled New York Legislature under Governor Charles Evans Hughes passed the Hart–Agnew anti-betting legislation. The owners of Sheepshead Bay Race Track, and other racing facilities in New York State, struggled to stay in business without income from betting. Racetrack operators had no choice but to drastically reduce the purse money being paid out which resulted in the Vernal Stakes offering a purse in 1910 that was less than one-half of what it had been in earlier years. These small purses made horse racing unprofitable and impossible for even the most successful horse owners to continue in business. Further restrictive legislation was passed by the New York Legislature in 1910 which resulted in the deepening of the financial crisis for track operators and led to a complete shut down of racing across the state during 1911 and 1912. When a Court ruling saw racing return in 1913 it was too late for the Sheepshead Bay facility and it never reopened.

== Records ==
Speed record:

- 0:59.00 @ 5 furlongs : Misgivings (1906)

Most wins by a jockey:

- 4 – Samuel Doggett (1893, 1894, 1895, 1898)

Most wins by a trainer:

- 4 – James G. Rowe Sr. (1902, 1906, 1907, 1908)

Most wins by an owner:

- 3 – James R. Keene (1902, 1907, 1908)

== Winners ==
| Year | Winner | Age | Jockey | Trainer | Owner | Dist. (Furlongs) | Time | Win$ |
|---|---|---|---|---|---|---|---|---|
| 1910 | Bashti | 2 | Joe Notter | Thomas Welsh | Newcastle Stable | 5 F | 1:00.00 | $1,890 |
| 1909 | Ocean Bound | 2 | Edward Taplin | French Brooks | Woodford Clay | 5 F | 0:59.20 | $1,925 |
| 1908 | Melisande | 2 | Joe Notter | James G. Rowe Sr. | James R. Keene | 5 F | 0:59.60 | $3,540 |
| 1907 | Megg's Hill | 2 | Walter Miller | James G. Rowe Sr. | James R. Keene | 5 F | 1:01.40 | $4,420 |
| 1906 | Misgivings | 2 | Walter Miller | James G. Rowe Sr. | August Belmont Jr. | 5 F | 0:59.00 | $4,510 |
| 1905 | Edna Jackson | 2 | Frank O'Neill | Fred Burlew | Patrick H. McCarren | 5 F | 1:00.80 | $4,330 |
| 1904 | Tradition | 2 | William Travers | A. Jack Joyner | Sydney Paget | 5 F | 1:02.20 | $4,010 |
| 1903 | Beldame | 2 | John Bullman | Fred Burlew | Newton Bennington | 5 F | 1:01.40 | $4,300 |
| 1902 | Duster | 2 | Willie Shaw | James G. Rowe Sr. | James R. & Foxhall P. Keene | 5 F | 1:01.00 | $3,505 |
| 1901 | Hatasoo | 2 | Winfield O'Connor | Julius J. Bauer | Arthur Featherstone | 5 F | 1:00.60 | $2,940 |
| 1900 | Sweet Lavender | 2 | Fred Littlefield | Charles S. Littlefield Jr. | Charles S. Littlefield Jr. | 5 F | 1:02.00 | $1,935 |
| 1899 | Killashandra | 2 | Richard Clawson | Sam Hildreth | Sydney Paget | 5 F | 1:02.40 | $2,140 |
| 1898 | Whiplash | 2 | Samuel Doggett | | James W. Colt | 5 F | 1:01.80 | $2,340 |
| 1897 | Briar Sweet | 2 | Fred Taral | Walter B. Jennings | Walter B. Jennings | 5 F | 1:01.80 | $1,450 |
| 1896 | Winged Foot | 2 | John J. McCafferty | John J. McCafferty | John J. McCafferty | 5 F | 1:02.40 | $1,895 |
| 1895 | Axiom | 2 | Samuel Doggett | Frank McCabe | Philip J. Dwyer | 5 F | 1:02.20 | $1,450 |
| 1894 | California | 2 | Samuel Doggett | Walter C. Rollins | Oneck Stable | 5 F | 1:02.40 | $1,950 |
| 1893 | J. P. B. | 2 | Samuel Doggett | Thomas Welsh | Charles Fleischmann & Sons | 6 F | 1:13.00 | $2,930 |
| 1892 | Harvest | 2 | Cox | Hardy Campbell Jr. | Michael F. Dwyer | 6 F | 1:13.40 | $2,930 |
