= Effendi (horse) =

American Thoroughbred racehorse

- Sire: Previous
- Grandsire: Meddler
- Dam: Hatasoo
- Damsire: Albert
- Sex: Colt
- Foaled: 1906
- Country: United States
- Colour: Brown
- Breeder: Julius J. Bauer
- Owner: 1) Clarence H. Mackay; 2) W. T. Ryan
- Trainer: Frank C. Frisbie
- Record: 160: 30-25-25
- Earnings: $17,389

Major wins
- Bay Ridge Handicap (1909) Triple Crown Race wins: Preakness Stakes (1909)

Effendi (foaled in 1906) was an American Thoroughbred racehorse is best known for winning the 1909 Preakness Stakes. Owned by W. T. Ryan, he was sired by Previous. Effendi was out of the mare Hatasoo, a daughter of Albert.

Effendi received much notoriety for two accomplishments that include; being nicknamed the iron horse after an incredible 160 starts in his career and Effendi's win in the 1909 Preakness Stakes marked the first time that any owners' silks were painted atop the Grand Clubhouse's Cupola on the weathervane. This display to honor the winner of a signature race by painting his silks upon an object spread throughout the world at other tracks.

== Preakness Stakes ==
Effendi, later nicknamed the iron horse went off as somewhat of a longshot at 15-1 in the field of ten with seven other colts listed with lower odds. Three horses of thirteen were scratched that day. The $2,725 Preakness Stakes at Pimlico Race Course in Baltimore, Maryland was run at one mile on the dirt on Wednesday, May 12, 1909.

Effendi broke in mid pack in fifth coming out of the gate under jockey Willie Doyle. But within a few strides he improved suddenly and burst into first as they hit Pimlico's famous "Clubhouse Turn." The pace was frantic as Effendi showed the most speed in every stage of the race. The first quarter went in :24 flat and the half in :48 flat as Effendi led by one and a half lengths. As the race progressed, According to the Maryland Jockey Club Media Guide Effendi set a killing pace hitting 3/4 of mile in 1:12-1/5 and completing the mile race in 1:39-4/5.

Doyle pushed the leader home as Effendi held off runner-up Fashion Plate comfortably by a length. It was two more lengths back to Hill Top in third. The final time of 1:39-4/5 to this day still stands as the fastest run Preakness Stakes in history. The chance of that record ever being broken is minimal in that the Preakness has been run at a mile and 3/16 since 1925, much longer than the mile that Effendi ran. The winner's share of the purse was $2,725 and a silver plate trophy.

== Later racing career ==
In the remainder of Effendi's racing years he was looked at by most spectators as "Mr. Consistent" and was nicknamed the "iron horse" because of starting 160 times in his six-year career. He amassed a bankroll of $17,389 by the time he retired which in those days was an incredible sum. He finished in the money in 50% of his career races, 80 of 160. He won a total of 30 races and had 25 runner-up performances and 25 third-place finishes. Records were very sketchy over a hundred years ago but records do show that Effendi won the Bay Ridge Handicap at Sheepshead Bay Race Track in Sheepshead Bay, Brooklyn. In addition to his Preakness Stakes win and Bay Ridge win in 1909, he also had second-places finishes in both the Long Island Handicap to Preakness adversary Fashion Plate and the Commonwealth Handicap.

== Breeding ==
Pedigree of Effendi
Sire Previous bay 1895	Meddler bay 1890	St. Gatien	The Rover
Sire Previous bay 1895	Meddler bay 1890	St. Gatien	Saint Editha
Sire Previous bay 1895	Meddler bay 1890	Busybody	Petrarch
Sire Previous bay 1895	Meddler bay 1890	Busybody	Spinaway
Sire Previous bay 1895	Sunnyside ch. 1887	Mortemer	Compienge
Sire Previous bay 1895	Sunnyside ch. 1887	Mortemer	Comtesse
Sire Previous bay 1895	Sunnyside ch. 1887	Sly Dance	War Dance
Sire Previous bay 1895	Sunnyside ch. 1887	Sly Dance	Sly Boots
Dam Hatasoo brown 1899	Albert bay 1882	Albert Victor	Marsyas
Dam Hatasoo brown 1899	Albert bay 1882	Albert Victor	The Princess of Wales
Dam Hatasoo brown 1899	Albert bay 1882	Hawthorn Bloom	Kettledrum
Dam Hatasoo brown 1899	Albert bay 1882	Hawthorn Bloom	Lady Alice Hawthon
Dam Hatasoo brown 1899	Hoodoo brown 1889	Darebin	The Pier
Dam Hatasoo brown 1899	Hoodoo brown 1889	Darebin	Lurline
Dam Hatasoo brown 1899	Hoodoo brown 1889	Miss Clay	Hindoo
Dam Hatasoo brown 1899	Hoodoo brown 1889	Miss Clay	Belle of Runnymeade
