= Municipal Handicap =

American horse race

- Class: Discontinued stakes
- Location: Morris Park Racecourse, The Bronx, New York (1895–1904); Belmont Park, Elmont, New York (1905–1918)
- Inaugurated: 1895–1918
- Race type: Thoroughbred – Flat racing

Race information
- Distance: 1 1/2 miles (12 furlongs)
- Surface: Dirt
- Track: left-handed
- Qualification: Three-years-old & older

The Municipal Handicap was an American Thoroughbred horse race for horses of either sex age three and older. It was held at Morris Park Racecourse in The Bronx, New York from inception in 1895 through 1904 when the racetrack closed. It was then run at the newly built Belmont Park from 1905 to 1909 then revived in 1914 and run until 1918 when the race was discontinued.

== Historical race notes ==
=== Ben Holladay's greatness ===
Eastin & Larabie won this race three straight years from 1897 through 1899 with their outstanding distance runner Ben Holladay who won his first Municipal Handicap under jockey Alonzo Clayton in which he set a new world record time of 2:59 1/4 for a mile and three-quarters. Ben Holladay's owner was a racing and breeding partnership created in 1886 between Montana banker and financier Samuel E. Larabie and Augustus Eastin, a wealthy Kentucky businessman. Following his 1899 season, the Wellington New Zealand Mail newspaper, reporting on racing in the United States, wrote that "Ben Holladay has proved himself this year to be by far the best long-distance horse in America" and quoting a front-page story in New York City's Spirit of the Times said that he is described as "the greatest Cup horse of the decade."

Henry of Navarre, Fair Play and Roamer were winners of the Municipal Handicap who would have careers that resulted in their induction into the U.S. Racing Hall of Fame.

== The Hart–Agnew Law: a disaster for racing ==
On June 11, 1908, the Republican-controlled New York Legislature under Governor Charles Evans Hughes passed the Hart–Agnew anti-betting legislation with penalties allowing for fines and up to a year in prison.

In spite of strong opposition by prominent owners such as August Belmont, Jr. and Harry Payne Whitney, reform legislators were not happy when they learned that betting was still going on at racetracks between individuals and they had further restrictive legislation passed by the New York Legislature in 1910 that made it possible for racetrack owners and members of its board of directors to be fined and imprisoned if anyone was found betting, even privately, anywhere on their premises. After a 1911 amendment to the law to limit the liability of owners and directors was defeated, every racetrack in New York State shut down. The consequences of this law meant the Municipal Handicap was not run from 1910 through 1913.

== Records ==
Speed record:

- 2:57 0/0 @ 1 3/4 miles, Major Daingerfield (1903)
- 2:33 2/5 @ 1 1/2 miles, Sunny Slope (1918)
- 2:04 0/0 @ 1 1/4 miles, Roamer (1914)

Most wins:

- 3 – Ben Holladay (1897, 1898, 1899)

Most wins by a jockey:

- 3 – George M. Odom (1900, 1902, 1903)
- 3 – Willie Knapp (1905, 1906, 1907)

Most wins by a trainer:

- 3 – Peter Wimmer (1897, 1898, 1899)

Most wins by an owner:

- 3 – Augustus Eastin & Samuel E. Larabie (1897, 1898, 1899)

== Winners ==
Year	Winner	Age	Jockey	Trainer	Owner	Dist. (Miles)	Time	Win$
1918	Sunny Slope	3	John Callahan	Richard F. Carman	Beach Stable (Richard F. Carman, et al.)	11/2 M	2:33.40	$2,150
1917	Clematis	4	Merritt C. Buxton	John Whalen	Oscar Lewisohn	11/2 M	2:34.00	$2,325
1916	Stromboli	5	John McTaggart	Sam Hildreth	August Belmont Jr.	11/2 M	2:39.00	$2,175
1915	Borrow	7	Joe Notter	James G. Rowe Sr.	Lewis S. Thompson	11/4 M	2:05.00	$1,875
1914	Roamer	3	James Butwell	A. J. Goldsborough	Andrew Miller	11/4 M	2:04.00	$2,150
1913	Race not held							
1912	No races held due to the Hart–Agnew Law.							
1911	No races held due to the Hart–Agnew Law.							
1910	Race not held							
1909	Olambala	3	James Butwell	T. J. Healey	Montpelier Stable	13/4 M	2:58.60	$1,060
1908	Fair Play	3	James Lee	A. Jack Joyner	August Belmont Jr.	13/4 M	2:58.00	$3,525
1907	Nealon	4	Willie Knapp	Frank M. Taylor	Patchogue Stable (William H. DuBois)	13/4 M	2:58.80	$3,945
1906	Dishabille	4	Willie Knapp	Charles A. Mulholland	George C. Bennett	13/4 M	2:57.60	$3,230
1905	St. Bellane	3	Willie Knapp	Richard E. Watkins	Edward R. Thomas	13/4 M	2:59.60	$2,820
1904	Gunfire	5	Willie Shaw	John W. Rogers	Herman B. Duryea	13/4 M	2:59.50	$2,850
1903	Major Daingerfield	4	George M. Odom	John E. Madden	William B. Leeds Sr. & Andrew Miller	13/4 M	2:57.00	$2,805
1902	Advance Guard	5	George M. Odom	Alexander Shields	Alexander Shields & James Carruthers	13/4 M	3:00.00	$2,730
1901	Latson	6	Otto Wonderly	John Hynes	Gottfried Walbaum	13/4 M	2:58.50	$3,495
1900	Ethelbert	4	George M. Odom	A. Jack Joyner	Perry Belmont	13/4 M	2:58.50	$3,125
1899	Ben Holladay	6	Henry Spencer	Peter Wimmer	Augustus Eastin & Samuel E. Larabie	13/4 M	3:00.50	$3,325
1898	Ben Holladay	5	Tommy Burns	Peter Wimmer	Augustus Eastin & Samuel E. Larabie	13/4 M	3:01.50	$2,750
1897	Ben Holladay	4	Alonzo Clayton	Peter Wimmer	Augustus Eastin & Samuel E. Larabie	13/4 M	2:59.25	$2,250
1896	Sir Walter	6	Samuel Doggett	Walter C. Rollins	Oneck Stable	13/4 M	3:05.00	$1,950
1895	Henry of Navarre	4	Henry Griffin	John J. Hyland	Blemton Stable	13/4 M	3:02.00	$2,400
