= Walter Rollins =

Walter Rollins is the name of:

- Walter C. Rollins (1857–1908), American racehorse trainer
- Walter E. Rollins (1906–1973), American songwriter/musician
- Walter Theodore Rollins, better known as Sonny Rollins (1930–2026), American jazz musician
