= Long Island Stakes =

- Class: Grade III
- Location: Aqueduct Racetrack; Ozone Park, New York, United States
- Inaugurated: 1894 (revived 1956)
- Race type: Thoroughbred – Flat racing
- Website: NYRA - Long Island Stakes

Race information
- Distance: 1 3/8 miles (11 furlongs)
- Surface: Turf
- Track: Left-handed
- Qualification: Fillies & mares, three-years-old & up
- Purse: US$250,000 (2025)

The Long Island Stakes is an American Thoroughbred horse race held annually in November at Aqueduct Racetrack, in Ozone Park, Queens, New York. The race is for fillies and mares, age three and up, willing to race the one and three-eighth miles on the turf.

Formerly a Grade II event, the race was downgraded to Grade III status in 2007.

== Historical notes ==
The original Long Island Handicap was established in 1894 at Sheepshead Bay Race Track in Sheepshead Bay, Brooklyn, New York. The race was open to horses of either gender age three and older and run on dirt over a distance of one mile and one furlong. It was last run in 1910 when the racetrack closed as a result of anti-gambling legislation.

A second edition of the Long Island Handicap was inaugurated in 1956 at Belmont Park. Through 1971 the race was open to horses of either gender, age three and older. It was hosted by Belmont Park in 1956–1960, 1962, 1964–1965, 1968–1969, 1972, 1975–1977, and 1989–1993.

Prior to 2017, the Long Island was run under handicap weights. Since then, the New York Racing Association has run the race under allowance weights.

Since its inception, the Long Island has been raced at various distances:

- 1 mile, 1 furlong : 1894–1910
- 1 mile : 1972
- 1 1/16 miles : 1973–1977
- 1 3/16 miles : 1959, 1961, 1963–1967, 1970–1971
- 1 3/8 miles : 1960, 1962, 1968–1969, 1989, 1997, 2000, 2018–2020
- 1 1/2 miles: 1990–1996, 1998–1999, 2001–2017, 2021–present
- 1 5/8 miles : 1956–1958

It was run in two divisions in 1958, 1962, 1967, 1969, 1970, 1972, 1974, 1985, 1990, and 1998.

== Records ==
Speed record: (at current distance of 1 3/8 miles on turf)

- 2:14.22 – R Calli Kim (2023)

Most wins:

- 2 – Parka (1964, 1965)
- 2 – Hush Dear (1982, 1983)
- 2 – Criticism (2008, 2009)
- 2 – Mutamakina (2020, 2021)

Most wins by an owner:

- 5 – Cragwood Stables (1967, 1969, 1970, 1974, 1976)

Most wins by a jockey:

- 5 – Jorge Velásquez (1969, 1971, 1974, 1976, 1980)

Most wins by a trainer:

- 5 – MacKenzie Miller (1967, 1969, 1970, 1974, 1976)

== Winners of the Long Island Stakes ==
Year	Winner	Age	Jockey	Trainer	Owner	Time
2025	Alluring Angel (GB)	5	Kendrick Carmouche	William I. Mott	Lawrence Goichman	2:17.07
2024	Be Your Best (IRE)	4	Frankie Dettori	Saffie Joseph Jr.	Michael J. Ryan	2:14.36
2023	R Calli Kim	6	José Ortiz	Brendan P. Walsh	Averill Racing LLC & Two Eight Racing	2:14.22
2022	Temple City Terror	6	José Ortiz	Brendan P. Walsh	Town & Country Racing	2:15.56
2021	Mutamakina (GB)	5	Dylan Davis	Christophe Clement	Al Shira'aa Farms	2:28.08
2020	Mutamakina (GB)	4	Dylan Davis	Christophe Clement	Al Shira'aa Farms	2:21.08
2019	Si Que Es Buena	6	Joel Rosario	Graham Motion	Takaya Shimakawa	2:19.68
2018	Lady Paname	4	Irad Ortiz Jr.	Chad C. Brown	Madaket Stables, James Covello, Kent Spellman & Doheny Racing Stable	2:16.15
2017	Arles	5	Nik Juarez	Graham Motion	Team Valor & Green Lantern Stables (Richard & Sue Masson)	2:28.65
2016	Evidently	5	Antonio Gallardo	Roy S. Lerman	Roy S. Lerman	2:34.50
2015	Goldy Espony	4	Kendrick Carmouche	Chad C. Brown	Swift Thoroughbreds & Bradley Thoroughbreds	2:31.10
2014	Aigue Marine	5	John Velazquez	Christophe Clement	Haras du Mezeray & Skymarc Farm	2:35.37
2013	Inimitable Romanee	4	Junior Alvarado	Christophe Clement	China Horse Club	2:34.28
2012	Starformer	4	Edgar Prado	William I. Mott	Juddmonte Farms	2:33.13
2011	Hit It Rich	4	Javier Castellano	Shug McGaughey	Stuart Janney III	2:30.39
2010	Mekong Melody	5	Alex Solis	Roger L. Attfield	David C. Egan	2:30.74
2009	Criticism	5	Javier Castellano	Thomas Albertrani	Darley Stable	2:34.98
2008	Criticism	4	Javier Castellano	Thomas Albertrani	Darley Stable	2:29.76
2007	Dalvina	3	Cornelio Velásquez	Edward A. L. Dunlop	Andrew & Marina Stone	2:34.35
2006	Safari Queen	4	Chris DeCarlo	Todd A. Pletcher	Arindel Farm	2:30.93
2005	Olaya	3	Edgar Prado	H. Graham Motion	Prince Faisal Salman	2:30.20
2004	Eleusis	3	José A. Santos	Jean-Claude Rouget	Gary A. Tanaka	2:31.40
2003	Spice Island	4	Victor Carrero	John Pregman Jr.	Denlea Park Stable	2:32.40
2002	Uriah	3	Norberto Arroyo Jr.	Harro Remmert	Gary A. Tanaka	2:42.40
2001	Queue	4	Jose Espinoza	Vincent Blengs	Gerald Robins	2:29.20
2000	Moonlady	3	Chris DeCarlo	Harro Remmert	Gary A. Tanaka	2:17.80
1999	Midnight Line	4	Jerry D. Bailey	Neil D. Drysdale	HRH Fahd bin Salman	2:29.60
1998	Coretta	4	José A. Santos	Christophe Clement	Gerald W. Leigh	2:29.60
1998	Yokama	5	Jerry D. Bailey	William I. Mott	Allen E. Paulson	2:31.00
1997	Sweetzie	5	Jorge F. Chavez	Rita Nash	Hamilton & Nash	2:16.60
1996	Ampulla	5	Shane Sellers	Patrick B. Byrne	North Cliff Farms	2:30.60
1995	Yenda	4	Corey Nakatani	Robert J. Frankel	Juddmonte Farms	2:37.00
1994	Market Booster	5	Mike Luzzi	D. Wayne Lukas	Moyglare Stud	2:31.80
1993	Trampoli	4	Mike E. Smith	Christophe Clement	Paul De Moussac	2:31.40
1992	Villandry	4	Mike E. Smith	André Fabre	David W. Wildenstein	2:29.00
1991	Shaima	3	Lanfranco Dettori	Luca Cumani	Sheikh Mohammed	2:31.40
1990	Rigamajig	4	Jorge F. Chavez	Richard A. DeStasio	Peter E. Blum	2:29.60
1990	Peinture Bleue	3	José A. Santos	André Fabre	Wildenstein Stable	2:29.80
1989	Warfie	3	Herb McCauley	Nick Zito	Akindale Farm	2:14.40
1988	Dancing All Night	4	Jacinto Vásquez	Claude R. McGaughey III	Ogden Phipps	2:34.20
1987	Stardusk	3	Jean Cruguet	Philip G. Johnson	Sally Hosta	2:30.40
1986	Dismasted	4	Jean-Luc Samyn	Philip G. Johnson	Edward P. Evans	2:30.40
1985	Videogenic	3	Jean Cruguet	Gasper S. Moschera	Albert Davis	2:29.20
1984	Heron Cove	4	Jean Cruguet	Kay Jensen	George L. Ohrstrom	2:32.80
1983	Hush Dear	5	Jean-Luc Samyn	J. Elliott Burch	C. V. Whitney	2:34.60
1982	Hush Dear	4	Eric Beitia	J. Elliott Burch	C. V. Whitney	2:31.40
1981	Euphrosyne	5	Richard Migliore	Stephen A. DiMauro	William de Burgh	2:33.00
1980	The Very One	5	Jorge Velásquez	Stephen A. DiMauro	Helen Polinger	2:35.20
1979	Flitalong	3	Ramon I. Encinas	Angel Penna Sr.	Ogden Mills Phipps	2:31.40
1978	Terpsichorist	3	Ángel Cordero Jr.	Woody Stephens	Hickory Tree Stable	2:34.00
1977	Pearl Necklace	3	Ruben Hernandez	Roger Laurin	Reginald N. Webster	1:43.80
1976	Javamine	3	Jorge Velásquez	MacKenzie Miller	Cragwood Stables	1:41.60
1975	Slip Screen	3	George Intelisano Jr.	Lucien Laurin	Meadow Stable	1:42.20
1974	D. O. Lady	3	Miguel A. Rivera	Vincent J. Cincotta	Gustave Ring	1:43.20
1974	Lie Low	3	Jorge Velásquez	MacKenzie Miller	Cragwood Stables	1:42.00
1973	Tuerta	3	Jacinto Vásquez	Frank Y. Whiteley Jr.	Claiborne Farm	1:43.80
1972	Primsie	3	Laffit Pincay Jr.	Frank Catrone	Ada L. Rice	1:37.80
1972	Twixt	3	Robert Woodhouse	Katharine Voss	Mrs. John M. Franklin	1:39.20
1971	Rudo Bird	4	Jorge Velásquez	Angel Penna Sr.	William A. Levin	2:03.20
1970	Larceny Kid	4	Chuck Baltazar	MacKenzie Miller	Cragwood Stables	2:02.00
1970	Mongo's Pride	3	Carlos Marquez	Don Combs	Mrs. Russell Reineman	2:01.20
1969	The University	4	Ángel Cordero Jr.	John M. Gaver Sr.	Greentree Stable	2:17.20
1969	Red Reality	3	Jorge Velásquez	MacKenzie Miller	Cragwood Stables	2:16.80
1968	Ruth's Rullah	3	Ángel Cordero Jr.	John P. Campo	Saul Nadler	2:14.80
1968	Flit-To	5	Manuel Ycaza	James P. Conway	Robert E. Lehman	2:15.20
1967	Munden Point	5	Bobby Ussery	Ira Hanford	Loren P. Guy	1:54.80
1967	Assagai	4	Braulio Baeza	MacKenzie Miller	Cragwood Stables	1:54.80
1966	Paoluccio	4	Heliodoro Gustines	John M. Gaver Sr.	Greentree Stable	1:58.60
1966	Rego	3	Hedley Woodhouse	James P. Conway	Niblick Stable	1:59.20
1965	Parka	7	Walter Blum	Warren A. Croll Jr.	Pelican Stable	1:54.60
1964	Parka	6	Walter Blum	Warren A. Croll Jr.	Pelican Stable	1:54.80
1963	David K.	4	Bill Shoemaker	Burley Parke	Louis Wolfson	1:54.60
1962	The Axe II	4	Bill Shoemaker	John M. Gaver Sr.	Greentree Stable	2:15.60
1962	Irish Dandy	4	John Ruane	not found	J. Gordon Douglas	2:15.80
1961	Wise Ship	4	Heliodoro Gustines	Jake Byer	Milton Ritzenberg	1:58.80
1960	El Espectador	5	Braulio Baeza	Jack Weipert	W. Cal Partee	2:16.60
1959	Tudor Era	6	Bill Hartack	Sidney Jacobs	Minnie G. Herff	1:54.00
1959	One Eyed King	6	Bill Shoemaker	Woody Stevens	Cain Hoy Stable	1:54.40
1958	Beau Diable	5	Hedley Woodhouse	George P. Odom	Laudy L. Lawrence	2:43.00
1957	Promethean	3	John Ruane	George P. Odom	Laudy L. Lawrence	2:44.00
1956	Third Brother	3	Ismael Valenzuela	Casey Hayes	Christopher T. Chenery	2:44.00

== Winners of the Long Island Handicap at Sheepshead Bay ==
Year	Winner	Age	Jockey	Trainer	Owner	Time
1910	Hilarious	4	Vincent Powers	James G. Rowe Sr.	James R. Keene	1:52.00
1909	Fashion Plate	3	Henry Smith	William H. Karrick	Oneck Stable	1:51.00
1908	Far West	6	Clifford Gilbert	Frank E. Brown	Frank E. Brown	1:52.00
1907	Cottontown	4	Sanday	Auval John Baker	Peter J. Millett	1:53.40
1906	Dishabille	4	Jack Martin	Charles A. Mulholland	George C. Bennett	1:54.80
1905	Proper	5	Tommy Burns	Walter B. Jennings	Walter B. Jennings	1:54.60
1904	Major Daingerfield	5	Jack Martin	Thomas Welsh	William B. Leeds	not found
1903	Douro	6	Arthur Redfern	Gwyn R. Tompkins	James W. Colt	1:53.20
1902	Herbert	5	Lewis Smith	Walter C. Rollins	Walter C. Rollins	1:55.00
1901	Gold Heels	3	Thomas H. Burns	Matthew M. Allen	Fred C. McLewee & Diamond Jim Brady	1:53.00
1900	Charentus	6	Willie Shaw	Jim McLaughlin	Orville L. Richards	1:54.00
1899	Bangle	4	Richard Clawson	not found	Edwin S. Gardner, Jr.	1:54.20
1898	Ogden	4	Anthony Hamilton	William Lakeland	Marcus Daly	1:54.80
1897	Clifford	7	Tod Sloan	H. Eugene Leigh	H. E. Leigh & Robert L. Rose	1:54.40
1896	Lucania	4	Tod Sloan	John W. Rogers	John W. Rogers	1:55.00
1895	Ramapo	5	Henry Griffin	John J. Hyland	David Gideon & John Daly	1:55.00
1894	Sir Walter	4	Samuel Doggett	Walter C. Rollins	Oneck Stable	1:55.00
