= Bay Ridge Handicap =

- Class: Discontinued stakes
- Location: Sheepshead Bay Race Track; Sheepshead Bay, Brooklyn, New York, United States
- Inaugurated: 1887–1910
- Race type: Thoroughbred – Flat racing

Race information
- Distance: 1 1/16 miles: 1910; 1 1/4 miles: 1901–1909
- Surface: Dirt
- Track: left-handed
- Qualification: Three years old & up

The Bay Ridge Handicap was an American Thoroughbred horse race run from 1901 through 1910 at Sheepshead Bay Race Track in Sheepshead Bay, Brooklyn, New York. A race for horses age three and older of either sex, it was run on dirt over a distance of a mile and a quarter until 1910 when it was reduced to a mile and a sixteenth.

== The end of a race and of a racetrack ==
The Bay Ridge Handicap was last run on June 18, 1910 after the Republican-controlled New York Legislature under Governor Charles Evans Hughes passed the Hart–Agnew anti-betting legislation on June 11, 1908. The owners of Sheepshead Bay Race Track, and other racing facilities in New York State, struggled to stay in business without betting. Racetrack operators had no choice but to drastically reduce the purse money being paid out which resulted in the Bay Ridge Handicap offering a purse in 1910 that was one-fifth of what it had been in earlier years. These small purses made horse racing unprofitable and impossible for even the most successful horse owners to continue in business. Further restrictive legislation was passed by the New York Legislature in 1910 which resulted in the deepening of the financial crisis for track operators and led to a complete shut down of racing across the state during 1911 and 1912. When a Court ruling saw racing return in 1913 it was too late for the Sheepshead Bay facility and it never reopened.

== Records ==
Speed record:

- 1 ¼ miles: 2:04.40 – Effendi (1909)

Most wins by a jockey:

- 2 – Willie Shaw (1901, 1906)

Most wins by a trainer:

- no trainer won this race more than once

Most wins by an owner:

- 2 – no owner won this race more than once

== Winners ==
Year	Winner	Age	Jockey	Trainer	Owner	Dist. (Miles)	Time	Win$
1910	Hampton Court	3	Carroll H. Shilling	Sam Hildreth	Sam Hildreth	11/16 M	1:54.40	$580
1909	Effendi	3	William F. Doyle	Frank C. Frisbie	W. T. Ryan	11/4 M	2:04.40	$485
1908	Old Honesty	4	Joe Notter	Andrew J. Gorey	Andrew J. Gorey	11/4 M	2:06.20	$510
1907	Gallavant	4	Guy Garner	T. J. Healey	Richard T. Wilson Jr.	11/4 M	2:07.00	$3,025
1906	Ram's Horn	4	Willie Shaw	W. S. (Wink) Williams	W. S. (Wink) Williams	11/4 M	2:05.60	$3,225
1905	Cairngorm	3	Willie Davis	A. Jack Joyner	Sydney Paget	11/4 M	2:08.20	$3,150
1904	Proper	4	Gene Hildebrand	Walter B. Jennings	Walter B. Jennings	11/4 M	2:06.20	$3,250
1903	Blues	5	John J. Hoar	Frank D. Weir	Frank J. Farrell	11/4 M	2:10.20	$1,630
1902	Advance Guard	5	Otto Wonderly	Alexander Shields	James Carruthers & Alexander Shields	11/4 M	2:07.20	$1,080
1901	Kamara	4	Willie Shaw	Charles F. Hill	Clarence H. Mackay	11/4 M	2:06.40	$1,085
