= Gene Hildebrand =

American jockey

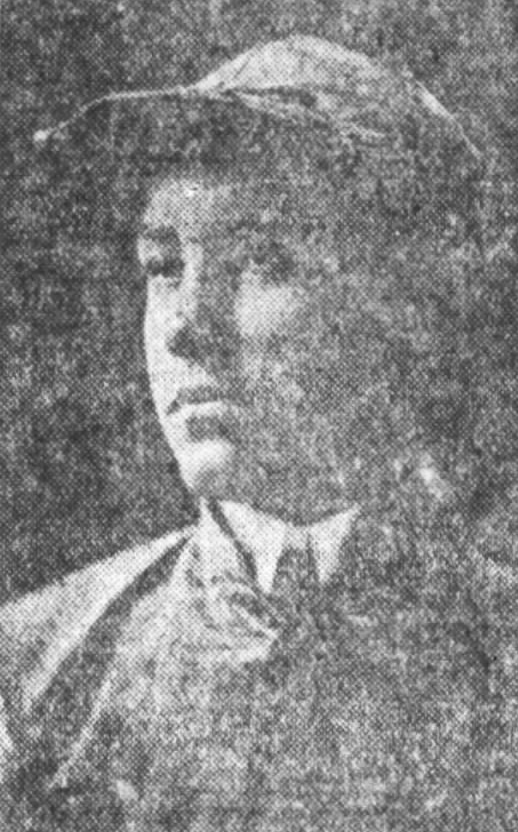

Personal information
- Born: August 16, 1887 Gilroy, California, United States
- Died: November 26, 1921 (aged 34) Oakland, California
- Occupation: Jockey

Horse racing career
- Sport: Horse racing

Major racing wins
- Advance Stakes (1904); Bay Ridge Handicap (1904); Belmont Futurity Stakes (1904); Bouquet Stakes (1904); Brighton Oaks (1904); Bronx Highweight Handicap (1904); Burns Handicap (1904); Edgemere Handicap (1904); Foam Stakes (1904); Great Filly Stakes (1904); Great Trial Stakes (1904); Hanover Stakes (1904); Hopeful Stakes (1904); Huron Handicap (1904); Islip Handicap (1904); Ladies Handicap (1904); Matron Stakes (1904); Neptune Stakes (1904); Speculation Stakes (1904); Tidal Stakes (1904); Troy Stakes (1904); Zephyr Stakes (1904); Arlington Hotel Stakes (1905); Autumn Stakes (1905); Brighton Handicap (1905); Capitol Hotel Stakes (1905); Columbus Stakes (1905); Fall Handicap (1905); Flash Stakes (1905); Golden Rod Stakes (1905); Great Eastern Handicap (1905); Occidental Handicap (1905); Peconic Handicap (1905); Sea Gull Stakes (1905); Seagate Stakes (1905); September Stakes (1905); Omnium Handicap (1905); Century Handicap (1906) American Classics wins: Preakness Stakes (1904); Belmont Stakes (1905)

Racing awards
- United States Champion Jockey by wins (1904)

Significant horses
- Artful, Beldame, Burgomaster, Hamburg Belle, Ort Wells, Tanya, Von Tromp, Whimsical

Eugene Hildebrand (August 16, 1887 - November 26, 1921) was an American National Champion jockey in Thoroughbred racing who won the 1904 Preakness Stakes and the 1905 Belmont Stakes, races that would become part of the U.S. Triple Crown series.

== Biography ==
Born in Gilroy, California on August 16, 1887, Gene Hildebrand began his career in Thoroughbred racing in 1901 working as a stable hand then as a jockey at Emeryville Race Track near Oakland, California. In 1904 he won the Burns Handicap which at the time was the most important race in California. Prominent owners on the East Coast took notice and Hildebrand competed at the big New York tracks where at Gravesend Race Track he won the 1904 Preakness Stakes on May 28 aboard the colt Bryn Mawr. He went on to win numerous top stakes races including the most prestigious event of that era, the Belmont Futurity Stakes. Back on the West Coast for the winter racing season, on December 23, 1904, Hildebrand set a new world record for wins in a year when he rode win number 293 at Ascot Park in Los Angeles. He would finish the year as the national champion in total races won with 297 and in stakes wins with 35.

Returning to the East Coast in 1905, on May 24 Hildebrand rode the filly Tanya to victory in the 1905 Belmont Stakes in its first running at the new Belmont Park track in Elmont, New York. Suspended on September 23, 1905, for rough riding, Hildebrand was not reinstated until March 9, 1906. The following day he rode at Oaklawn Park in Hot Springs, Arkansas. From three mounts in the first three races on the day's card, he finished second in the opening race, won the second race, and finished fourth in the third race.

Gene Hildebrand battled weight gain which hindered his racing and would force him to retire from riding in 1909. For several years he remained in the industry as an owner of a small stable of racehorses. In 1919 he fell ill with a flu that plagued him for two years until it turned to pneumonia and he died in an Oakland, California hospital on November 26, 1921, at the age of 34.
