= First Flight (racehorse) =

American-bred Thoroughbred racehorse

- Sire: Mahmoud
- Grandsire: Blenheim
- Dam: Fly Swatter
- Damsire: Dis Donc
- Sex: Filly
- Foaled: 1944
- Country: United States
- Colour: Bay
- Breeder: Cornelius Vanderbilt Whitney
- Owner: Cornelius Vanderbilt Whitney
- Trainer: Sylvester E. Veitch
- Record: 24: 11-3-3
- Earnings: US$197,965

Major wins
- Fashion Stakes (1946); Astoria Stakes (1946); Matron Stakes (1946); Futurity Stakes (1946); Monmouth Oaks (1947); Fall Highweight Handicap (1948)

Awards
- American Champion Two-Year-Old Filly (1946)

First Flight (foaled 1944 in Kentucky) was an American Thoroughbred racehorse who was voted the American Champion Two-Year-Old Filly of 1946

== Background ==
First Flight was bred and raced by Cornelius Vanderbilt Whitney and conditioned for racing by Hall of Fame inductee, Sylvester Veitch.

== Racing career ==
Her first season started in May 1946 where she equaled a Belmont Park track record in winning her racing debut with Arnold Kirkland aboard in the Fashion Stakes. After a "going away" victory in the Astoria Stakes during June, the filly received some time off. She went on to win the Matron Stakes on September 28. 7 days later the filly defeated colts in winning (the then) most prestigious race for juveniles, the Futurity Stakes in October. Ridden by Eddie Arcaro, First Flight beat I Will by one and a half lengths with the future Kentucky Derby winner Jet Pilot in third. In doing so, she became the first filly to win the Futurity since the Whitney-owned Top Flight in 1931. Her 5 for 6 season gained her the Two-Year-Old Filly Championship

At age three, she won two races with her main victory coming in the Monmouth Oaks.

At age four, her major win came against males when she captured the 1948 Fall Highweight Handicap. She won three other races that year to compile a record of 11 wins in 24 lifetime starts.

== Pedigree ==
Pedigree of First Flight
Sire Mahmoud	Blenheim	Blandford	Swynford
Sire Mahmoud	Blenheim	Blandford	Blanche
Sire Mahmoud	Blenheim	Malva	Charles O'Malley
Sire Mahmoud	Blenheim	Malva	Wild Arum
Sire Mahmoud	Mah Mahal	Gainsborough	Bayardo
Sire Mahmoud	Mah Mahal	Gainsborough	Rosedrop
Sire Mahmoud	Mah Mahal	Mumtaz Mahal	The Tetrarch
Sire Mahmoud	Mah Mahal	Mumtaz Mahal	Lady Josephine
Dam Fly Swatter	Dis Donc	Sardanapale	Prestige
Dam Fly Swatter	Dis Donc	Sardanapale	Gemma
Dam Fly Swatter	Dis Donc	Lady Hamburg	Hamburg
Dam Fly Swatter	Dis Donc	Lady Hamburg	Lady Frivoles
Dam Fly Swatter	Miss Whisk	Whisk Broom	Broomstick
Dam Fly Swatter	Miss Whisk	Whisk Broom	Audience
Dam Fly Swatter	Miss Whisk	Wonder	Disguise
Dam Fly Swatter	Miss Whisk	Wonder	Curiosity
