= Herbert Herff =

American businessman and philanthropist

- Born: October 18, 1891; Wabash, Indiana
- Died: December 27, 1966 (aged 75); Palm Beach, Florida
- Occupations: Automobile dealer, philanthropist, racehorse owner
- Known for: Major benefactor to the University of Memphis
- Board member of: Herff Motor Company
- Spouse: Minnie G. (1899-1988)

Herbert Herff (October 18, 1891 – December 27, 1966) was an American businessman and philanthropist.

A civic and business leader in Memphis, Tennessee, in 1938 Herbert Herff raised the funds to establish the first blood bank in the U.S. South and only the fourth such facility in the entire country. Years later, Herff's foundation was the first in Memphis to provide funding for sickle cell anemia. In 1964 he and his wife, Minnie G. Herff (1899–1988), donated the money to establish the Herff College of Engineering at the University of Memphis. When he died in 1966, Herbert Herff left the bulk of his estate in trust with the State of Tennessee for the benefit of the university. More than forty years later, the trust continues to help sustain and expand university programs. Among them are the:

- Herbert Herff Professor of Biomedical Engineering
- Herbert Herff Chair of Excellence in Law – Cecil C. Humphreys School of Law
- Herbert Herff Presidential Law Scholarships
- Herbert Herff Registration Loan Program - established to provide short-term loan assistance to students who have no means of paying their registration fees.
- Herbert Herff Book Loan Program

Herbert Herff was an owner of Thoroughbred racehorses. Notably, he and his wife raced the colt Tudor Era who in 1959 won the Long Island Handicap, Man o' War Stakes, and the Longfellow Handicap.

He died at a hospital in Palm Beach, Florida, where he had a winter home.

== Sources ==
- Story involving Herbert Herff reproduced from TABB News Vol. 3(2), Autumn 1977
- Herff College of Engineering at the University of Memphis
