= Neptune Stakes =

- Class: Defunct horse race
- Location: Brighton Beach Race Course, Brighton Beach, Brooklyn, New York, United States
- Inaugurated: 1900
- Race type: Thoroughbred - Flat racing

Race information
- Distance: 3/4 mile (6 furlongs)
- Surface: Dirt
- Track: Left-handed
- Qualification: Two-year-olds

The Neptune Stakes was an American Thoroughbred horse race for two-year-old horses at Brighton Beach Race Course in the Brighton Beach section of Brooklyn, New York. Inaugurated in 1900, the last edition of the race at the Brighton Beach track took place in 1907. It would be run only one more time when it was revived in 1910 at the Empire City Race Track in Yonkers, New York.

The 1900 inaugural running of the Neptune Stakes was won by the colt Tommy Atkins ridden by top jockey Henry Spencer for trainer James G. Rowe Sr., a future National Museum of Racing and Hall of Fame inductee, and owner James R. Keene and his son, Foxhall P. Keene. Trainer Rowe and the owners would win the Neptune Stakes again in 1902 and 1906. Winner Tommy Atkins, again with Henry Spencer as his jockey, also won the 1900 Juvenile Stakes at New York's Morris Park Racecourse.

== End of the Neptune ==
The race's demise was a result of the 1908 passage of the Hart–Agnew anti-betting legislation by the New York Legislature under Republican Governor Charles Evans Hughes which led to a state-wide shutdown of racing in 1911 and 1912.

It would be five years after Hart-Agnew became law that a February 21, 1913 ruling by the New York Supreme Court, Appellate Division saw horse racing return in that year. However, operating losses were of such significance for the investors in the Brighton Beach Race Course facility that it never reopened.

== Records ==
Speed record:

- 1:13.00 @ 6 furlongs - Ormonde's Right (1903)

Most wins by a jockey:

- No jockey won this race more than once.

Most wins by a trainer:

- 3 - James G. Rowe Sr. (1900, 1902, 1906)
- 3 - A. Jack Joyner (1903, 1904, 1905)

Most wins by an owner:

- 2 - James R. Keene (1900, 1902, 1906)

== Winners ==
Year	Winner	Age	Jockey	Trainer	Owner	Dist. (Furlongs)	Time	Win$
1910	Royal Meteor	2	Joe Notter	Thomas Welsh	Newcastle Stable	6 F	1:16.00	$1,420
1908	1909	Race not held						
1907	Chapultepec	2	Eddie Dugan	Fred Burlew	Fred Burlew	6 F	1:14.60	$5,850
1906	Ballot	2	Herman Radtke	James G. Rowe Sr.	James R. Keene	6 F	1:15.00	$5,850
1905	Don Diego	2	Willie Davis	A. Jack Joyner	August Belmont Jr.	6 F	1:13.80	$5,850
1904	Tradition	2	Gene Hildebrand	A. Jack Joyner	Sydney Paget	6 F	1:14.00	$5,850
1903	Ormonde's Right	2	Frank O'Neill	A. Jack Joyner	Sydney Paget	6 F	1:13.00	$5,349
1902	Injunction	2	Willie Shaw	James G. Rowe Sr.	James R. & Foxhall P. Keene	6 F	1:13.80	$3,900
1901	Otis	2	Harry Cochran	Dick Williams	Barney Schreiber	6 F	1:13.20	$3,900
1900	Tommy Atkins	2	Henry Spencer	James G. Rowe Sr.	James R. & Foxhall P. Keene	6 F	1:14.00	$3,900
