= Occidental Handicap =

- Class: Discontinued stakes
- Location: Gravesend Race Track, Gravesend, Brooklyn, New York
- Inaugurated: 1899
- Race type: Thoroughbred - Flat racing

Race information
- Surface: Dirt
- Track: left-handed
- Qualification: Three-year-olds and up

The Occidental Handicap was an American Thoroughbred horse race held annually from 1899 through 1909 at Gravesend Race Track, Gravesend, Brooklyn, New York. A race for horses of either sex age three and older, it was contested on dirt over a distance of a mile and one-eighth until its final running when it became a mile and one-quarter selling race.

== Historical notes ==
First run on September 16, 1899, the Occidental Handicap would come to be regarded as an important stakes race on the New York fall schedule. Among the winners was the famous "mudder" Herbert who won back-to-back editions in 1901 and 1902. The race's only two-time winner, Herbert would duplicate that feat with wins in the Merchants and Citizens Handicap in 1901 and 1902.

In her September 26, 1907 win, the three-year-old filly Gold Lady set a new track record for a mile and one-eighth with a time of 1:51 3/5.

== Demise of the Occidental Handicap ==
The status of the race as being important to the Gravesend track's fall racing schedule would change on June 11, 1908, when the Republican controlled New York Legislature under Governor Charles Evans Hughes passed the Hart–Agnew anti-betting legislation. The owners of Gravesend Race Track, and other racing facilities in New York State, struggled to stay in business without income from betting. Racetrack operators had no choice but to drastically reduce the purse money being paid out which resulted in the Occidental Handicap offering a purse in 1909 that was less than one-third of what it had been in earlier years. These small purses made horse racing unprofitable and impossible for even the most successful horse owners to continue in business. As such, for the 1910 racing season management of the Gravesend facility dropped some of its stakes races and used the purse money to bolster its most important events. Although a February 21, 1913 ruling by the New York Supreme Court, Appellate Division saw horse racing return in 1913, it was too late for the Occidental Handicap.

== Records ==
Speed record:

- 1:41.60 @ 1 1-8 miles: Gold Lady (1907)

Most wins:

- 2 - Herbert (1901, 1902)

Most wins by a jockey:

- 2 - Lewis Smith (1901, 1902)
- 2 - Eddie Dugan (1908, 1909)

Most wins by a trainer:

- 2 - Julius J. Bauer (1899, 1908)
- 2 - Walter C. Rollins (1901, 1902)
- 2 - Walter B. Jennings (1904, 1905)

Most wins by an owner:

- 2 - Bromley & Co. (1899, 1908)
- 2 - Walter C. Rollins (1901, 1902)
- 2 - Walter B. Jennings (1904, 1905)

== Winners ==
Year	Winner	Age	Jockey	Trainer	Owner	Dist. (Miles)	Time	Win$
1909	Firestone	4	Eddie Dugan	Sam Hildreth	Sam Hildreth	1 1-4 m	2:07.20	$1,050
1908	Priscillian	3	Eddie Dugan	Julius J. Bauer	Bromley & Co. (Arthur Featherstone)	1 1-8 m	1:52.00	$1,875
1907	Gold Lady	3	Joe Notter	William McCann	Anthony L. Aste	1 1-8 m	1:51.60	$3,350
1906	Coy Maid	4	Guy Garner	John I. Smith	Kenilworth Stable (Frederick C. McLewee)	1 1-8 m	1:53.40	$3,390
1905	Proper	5	Gene Hildebrand	Walter B. Jennings	Walter B. Jennings	1 1-8 m	1:55.40	$2,870
1904	Dainty	4	William Crimmins	Walter B. Jennings	Walter B. Jennings	1 1-8 m	1:52.60	$2,980
1903	Caughnawaga	4	George M. Odom	William Hayward Jr.	John Sanford	1 1-8 m	1:52.40	$1,795
1902	Herbert	5	Lewis Smith	Walter C. Rollins	Walter C. Rollins	1 1-8 m	1:53.20	$1,930
1901	Herbert	4	Lewis Smith	Walter C. Rollins	Walter C. Rollins	1 1-8 m	1:53.00	$1,695
1900	Pink Coat	6	Tommy Burns	Patrick Dunne	J. Hal Woodford & Mr. Buckner	1 1-8 m	1:53.80	$1,890
1899	Previous	4	Winfield O'Connor	Julius J. Bauer	Bromley & Co. (Arthur Featherstone)	1 1-8 m	1:54.60	$1,850
