= Joe Notter =

American jockey

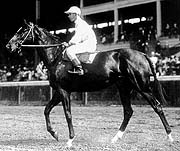
- Joe Notter aboard Colin, 1908

Personal information
- Born: June 21, 1890 Brooklyn, New York, United States
- Died: April 10, 1973 (aged 82)
- Occupation: Jockey

Horse racing career
- Sport: Horse racing

Major racing wins
- As a jockey: Belles Stakes (1906); Remsen Stakes (1906); Advance Stakes (1907, 1908, 1910); Alabama Stakes (1907); Aqueduct Handicap (1907); Brighton Handicap (1907); Edgemere Handicap (1907); Fall Handicap (1907); Fashion Stakes (1907, 1908); Flying Handicap (1907); Islip Handicap (1907); Occidental Handicap (1907); Omnium Handicap (1907); Spring Stakes (1907); Travers Stakes (1907); Winged Foot Handicap (1907, 1910); Withers Stakes (1907, 1908); Astoria Stakes (1908); Bay Ridge Handicap (1908); Champagne Stakes (1908); Demoiselle Stakes (1908); Golden Rod Stakes (1908); Great Filly Stakes (1908); Junior Champion Stakes (1908); Laureate Stakes (1908, 1914); Matron Stakes (1908); Mount Vernon Handicap (1908); New Rochelle Handicap (1908); Spinaway Stakes 1908); Hopeful Stakes (1908, 1914, 1915); Futurity Stakes (1908, 1915); Brooklyn Handicap (1908, 1913); Suburban Handicap (1908, 1913); Surf Stakes (1908); Tidal Stakes (1908); Vernal Stakes (1908, 1910); Neptune Stakes (1910); Metropolitan Handicap (1913); Saratoga Handicap (1914); Saratoga Special Stakes (1914); Fall Highweight Handicap (1915, 1916); Municipal Handicap (1915); Delaware Handicap (1916) American Classics wins: Kentucky Derby (1915); Belmont Stakes (1908) As a trainer: Juvenile Stakes (1921); Huron Handicap (1929); Belmont Futurity Stakes (1932); Queens County Handicap (1933)

Racing awards
- United States Champion Jockey by earnings (1908)

Honours
- United States' Racing Hall of Fame (1963)

Significant horses
- Ballot, Colin, Fair Play, Maskette, Peter Pan, Regret, Whisk Broom II
- Updated on April 12, 2010

Joseph A. Notter (June 21, 1890 - April 10, 1973) was an American Hall of Fame Champion jockey and winner of two of the American Classic Races.

A native of Brooklyn, New York, Joe Notter rode prominently in the first decades of the 20th century. Statistics from his racing career as a jockey are limited but it is known that he was working as a stable boy at age ten and was riding and winning at age thirteen. He developed a reputation as a good handler of young horses and rode winners in several important stakes races for two-year-old horses including three wins in the important Hopeful Stakes.

During his career, Joe Notter rode U.S. Racing Hall of Fame inductees Maskette and Colin for owner James R. Keene plus Regret and Whisk Broom II for Harry Payne Whitney. 1908 would be Notter's most successful earnings year when he won purses totalling $464,322 which smashed the existing record and remained unmatched for another fifteen years. Aboard Colin in the 1908 Belmont Stakes, Notter misjudged the finish line and eased the horse up. At the time, he was six lengths in front and still won by a head over the onrushing Fair Play. In the 1957 Kentucky Derby, jockey Bill Shoemaker would make the same mistake with Gallant Man and lose the race.

In 1913 Notter became the first jockey to win the New York Handicap Triple when he rode Whisk Broom II to victory in the Metropolitan, Suburban and Brooklyn Handicaps. He rode in the Kentucky Derby three times, winning it in 1915 aboard Regret, the first filly to ever win the Classic, and took second place in 1918 on the Woodburn Stud colt, Escoba. Notter competed in the Preakness Stakes only once, finishing twelfth in the 1910 edition.

Notter battled weight problems and after 1908 limited himself to dieting enough to be able to ride in selected stakes races. He retired in 1923 having won fifty-six important stakes races then turned to training for a time before working as a racing official.

Joe Notter was inducted in the United States' Racing Hall of Fame in 1963.
