= Royal Tourist =

American-bred Thoroughbred racehorse

- Sire: Sandringham
- Grandsire: St. Simon
- Dam: Leisure
- Damsire: Meddler
- Sex: Stallion
- Foaled: 1905
- Country: United States
- Color: Bay
- Breeder: Harry Payne Whitney
- Owner: 1) Harry Payne Whitney; 2) Charles R. Ellison; 3) H. Guy Bedwell; 4) G. F. Calmbach
- Trainer: 1) John W. Rogers; 2) A. Jack Joyner
- Earnings: US$ not found

Major wins
- Autumn Stakes (1907); Oakdale Handicap (1907); Loantaka Stakes (1908); Winters Handicap (1908) American Classics wins: Preakness Stakes (1908)

Royal Tourist (1905–1909) was an American Thoroughbred racehorse who won the American Classic Preakness Stakes in 1908 and who later that year set a World Record time in winning the Winters Handicap at Emeryville Race Track in Oakland, California.

== Background ==
Bred and raced by Harry Payne Whitney, Royal Tourist's sire was the unraced British import, Sandringham, a son of the outstanding runner and nine-time Leading sire in Great Britain & Ireland, St. Simon. His dam was Leisure, who was also the dam of the 1914 Preakness Stakes winner, Holiday. Leisure's sire was Meddler, the leading sire in North America in 1904 and 1906.

== Racing career ==
Racing at age two under trainer John Rogers, on September 10, 1907, Royal Tourist earned his first win in the Autumn Stakes at Sheepshead Bay Race Track with a stakes record time of 1:11 flat for six furlongs. He went on that year to win the Oakdale Handicap at Aqueduct Racetrack. As a three-year-old in 1908, Royal Tourist's race conditioning was handled by Jack Joyner who took over as trainer of the Whitney racing stable on the death of John Rogers in February. In the pre U.S. Triple Crown era, Royal Tourist was not entered in the Kentucky Derby but on June 2, 1908, under jockey Eddie Dugan, he won what is now the second leg of the Triple Crown series, the Preakness Stakes, contested at the time at a distance of 1^{1}/16 miles at Gravesend Race Track.

Harry Whitney sold Royal Tourist in the early fall of 1908 to Chicagoan Charles R. Ellison. The owner of a number of successful horses, Ellison had won the 1903 Kentucky Derby with Judge Himes and finished second in 1906 with the very good filly, Lady Navarre. Ellison sent Royal Tourist to race in California where in November he set a new World Record of 1:44 1/5 for 1^{1}/16 miles on dirt in the Winters Handicap at Emeryville Race Track in Oakland, California. The colt wintered in California and continued to race there in 1909.

Royal Tourist died of a fever while still in training at the Hamilton (Ont.) racetrack stables on September 27, 1909.

== Pedigree ==
Pedigree of Royal Tourist (USA), bay stallion, 1905
Sire Sandringham (GB) 1896	St Simon (GB); 1881	Galopin	Vedette
Sire Sandringham (GB) 1896	St Simon (GB); 1881	Galopin	Flying Duchess
Sire Sandringham (GB) 1896	St Simon (GB); 1881	St Angela	King Tom
Sire Sandringham (GB) 1896	St Simon (GB); 1881	St Angela	Adeline
Sire Sandringham (GB) 1896	Perdita (GB); 1881	Hampton	Lord Clifden*^
Sire Sandringham (GB) 1896	Perdita (GB); 1881	Hampton	Lady Langden
Sire Sandringham (GB) 1896	Perdita (GB); 1881	Hermione	Young Melbourne
Sire Sandringham (GB) 1896	Perdita (GB); 1881	Hermione	La Belle Helene
Dam Leisure (USA) 1900	Meddler (GB); 1890	St Gatien	The Rover
Dam Leisure (USA) 1900	Meddler (GB); 1890	St Gatien	Saint Editha
Dam Leisure (USA) 1900	Meddler (GB); 1890	Busybody	Petrarch^
Dam Leisure (USA) 1900	Meddler (GB); 1890	Busybody	Spinaway
Dam Leisure (USA) 1900	Yorkville Belle (USA); 1889	Miser	Australian (GB)
Dam Leisure (USA) 1900	Yorkville Belle (USA); 1889	Miser	Aerolite
Dam Leisure (USA) 1900	Yorkville Belle (USA); 1889	Thora	Longfellow
Dam Leisure (USA) 1900	Yorkville Belle (USA); 1889	Thora	Susan Ann

* Royal Tourist is inbred 4S x 5D to the stallion Lord Clifden, meaning that he appears fourth generation on the sire side of his pedigree and fifth generation (via Petrarch)^ on the dam side of his pedigree.
