= Autumn Stakes (United States) =

- Class: Defunct stakes
- Location: Sheepshead Bay Race Track, Sheepshead Bay, Brooklyn, New York, United States
- Inaugurated: 1880
- Race type: Thoroughbred - Flat racing

Race information
- Distance: 6 furlongs
- Surface: Dirt
- Track: left-handed
- Qualification: Two-year-olds

The Autumn Stakes was an American Thoroughbred horse race held annually for thirty years at Sheepshead Bay Race Track in Sheepshead Bay, Brooklyn, New York. Inaugurated the year the track opened in 1880, it was an important event run on dirt that was open to two-year-old horses of either sex. Initially contested at a distance of six furlongs, from 1890 through 1899 it was raced over the track's Futurity Course at 5.75 furlongs before returning to the original distance.

In its September 10, 1880 reporting on the inaugural Autumn Stakes that resulted in a dead heat between Brambaletta and Bonnie Lizzie, the New York Times called it "one of the most magnificent finishes ever seen."

Dinna Ken, from the Harry P. Whitney stable, finished first in the 1906 running of the Autumn Stakes but was disqualified for a crossing interference at the start of the race that gave runner-up Arcite the win.

== Notable winners ==
=== U.S. National Champions ===
In the twenty-three runnings of the Autumn Stakes from 1887 thru 1909 there are six winners that would earn National Champion two-year-old recognition. Emperor of Norfolk (1887), Hamburg (1897), and Mesmerist (1899) were named American Champion Two-Year-Old Colt. The winners in each of three consecutive years, Sallie McClelland (1890), Yorkville Belle (1891), and Lady Violet (1892), would be named American Champion Two-Year-Old Filly.

=== Future Hall of Fame inductees ===
Firenze won the 1886 edition of the Autumn Stakes under the race management of trainer James Murphy for owner James B. A. Haggin. A filly, Firenze would go on to earn National Championship recognition as the American Champion Three-Year-Old Filly of 1887. Then, in each of the ensuing three years she was chosen the American Champion Older Female Horse. In 1975 Firenze would be recognized with Thoroughbred racing's highest honor when she was inducted into the United States Racing Hall of Fame.

Emperor of Norfolk won the eighth edition of the Autumn Stakes in 1887. Owned by the prominent California businessman Lucky Baldwin, Emperor of Norfolk would be recognized as that year's American Champion Two-Year-Old Colt. He would go on to earn American Champion Three-Year-Old Colt honors and in 1988 would be inducted into the Racing Hall of Fame.

Hamburg, the 1897 Autumn Stakes winner, continued to have success in racing which would see him recognized as the 1898 American Horse of the Year. As a stallion at stud, he would be 1905's Leading sire in North America and in 1986 would be inducted into the Racing Hall of Fame. When racing, Hamburg was owned by John E. Madden who remains to this day the only person to be inducted into both the Harness racing and Thoroughbred racing Hall of Fame. Madden named his breeding farm in Lexington, Kentucky Hamburg Place in honor of the horse whose race earnings and selling price made the farm's acquisition possible.

== Demise ==
In 1908, the administration of Governor Charles Evans Hughes signed into law the Hart–Agnew bill that effectively banned all racetrack betting in the state of New York. The legislation allowed for fines and up to a year in prison which was strictly enforced.

Racetrack operators had no choice but to drastically reduce the purse money being paid out which resulted in the Autumn Stakes offering a purse in 1909 that was less than five percent of what it had been at its peak in earlier years. These small purses made horse racing unprofitable and impossible for even the most successful horse owners to continue in business. As such, for the 1910 racing season management of the Sheepshead Bay facility dropped some of its minor stakes races and used the purse money to bolster its most important events. Compounding matters for the Sheepshead Bay track was intense competition. In a summary of 1909 racing, the Daily Racing Form reported that "Sheepshead Bay, which for years led the country in daily average distribution, yielded first place in 1909 to Belmont Park, which August Belmont and his associates are ambitious to make the "turf headquarters of America".

A 1910 amendment to the Hart–Agnew legislation added further restrictions that made the owners and directors of a racetrack personally liable for any betting done on their premises, with or without their consent. Such an onerous liability was intolerable and meant that by 1911 all racetracks in the state ceased operations. Although a February 21, 1913 ruling by the New York Supreme Court, Appellate Division paved the way for racing to resume that year, by then it was too late for horse racing at the Sheepshead Bay Race Track and it was ultimately sold to the Sheepshead Bay Speedway Corporation who used it for automobile racing.

In December of 1919, the Sheepshead Bay facility, a business that the Daily Racing Form called one of the most famous racetracks in the history of the American turf, was purchased for real estate development. The infrastructure was torn down and the land subdivided into building lots.

== Records ==
Speed record:

- 1:11.00 @ 6 furlongs: Royal Tourist (1907)
- 1:09.20 @ 5 3/4 furlongs: Mesmerist (1899)

Most wins by a jockey:

- 3 - Fred Taral (1893, 1895, 1897)

Most wins by a trainer:

- 3 - James G. Rowe Sr. (1882, 1889, 1903)
- 3 - John J. Hyland (1880, 1901, 1902)
- 3 - John W. Rogers (1896, 1905, 1907)

Most wins by an owner:

- 3 - James Ben Ali Haggin (1885, 1886, 1888)
- 3 - August Belmont Jr. / Blemton Stable (1892, 1901, 1902)

== Winners ==
Year	Winner	Age	Jockey	Trainer	Owner	Dist. (Furlongs)	Time	Win $	
1909	Cherryola	2	Eddie Dugan	John T. Ireland	John T. Ireland	6 F	1:13.60	$390	
1908	Trance	2	Dave R. McDaniel	George M. Odom	George M. Odom	6 F	1:12.40	$3,405	
1907	Royal Tourist	2	Dave R. McDaniel	John W. Rogers	Harry Payne Whitney	6 F	1:11.00	$4,085	
1906	Arcite	2	Roscoe Troxler	Peter W. Coyne	George J. Long	6 F	1:12.00	$3,955	
1905	Juggler	2	Gene Hildebrand	John W. Rogers	Harry Payne Whitney	6 F	1:13.60	$4,610	
1904	Waterside	2	Frank O'Neill	John E. Madden	John E. Madden	6 F	1:12.60	$2,935	
1903	Knight Errant	2	Willie Gannon	James G. Rowe Sr.	James R. & Foxhall P. Keene	6 F	1:13.00	$3,900	
1902	Fire Eater	2	John Bullman	John J. Hyland	August Belmont Sr.	6 F	1:13.80	$2,450	
1901	Leonid	2	Winfield O'Connor	John J. Hyland	August Belmont Sr.	6 F	1:16.00	$2,450	
1900	Longshoreman	2	Tod Sloan	Frank L. Gardner	Frank L. Gardner	6 F	1:14.40	$2,450	
1899	Mesmerist	2	Winfield O'Connor	Julius Bauer	Bromley & Co. (Joseph E. Bromley & Arthur Featherstone)	5.75 F	1:09.20	$2,425	
1898	Scannel	2	Tod Sloan	Charles Hill	Frank V. Alexander	5.75 F	1:11.80	$2,425	
1897	Hamburg	2	Fred Taral	John E. Madden	John E. Madden	5.75 F	1:11.00	$2,425	
1896	Savarin	2	Alonzo Clayton	John W. Rogers	John W. Rogers	5.75 F	1:10.20	$2,425	
1895	Crescendo	2	Fred Taral	John G. Givens	Pueblo Stable (J. Naglee Burk)	5.75 F	1:10.20	$2,450	
1894	Applause	2	Samuel Doggett	William C. Smith	George E. Smith	5.75 F	1:12.00	$3,525	
1893	Dobbins	2	Fred Taral	Hardy Campbell Jr.	Richard Croker	5.75 F	1:11.20	$4,225	
1892	Lady Violet	2	Edward Garrison	A. Jack Joyner	Blemton Stable	5.75 F	1:11.60	$3,850	
1891	Yorkville Belle	2	Samuel Doggett	Matthew M. Allen	Fred C. McLewee	5.75 F	1:09.60	$4,600	
1890	Sallie McClelland	2	Monk Overton	Byron McClelland	Byron McClelland	5.75 F	1:10.00	$4,200	
1889	Magnate	2	George Anderson	James G. Rowe Sr.	August Belmont Sr.	6 F	1:14.80	$5,200	
1888	Fresno	2	Edward Garrison	Matthew Byrnes	James B. A. Haggin	6 F	1:15.00	$6,000	
1887	Emperor of Norfolk	2	Isaac Burns Murphy	John W. McClelland	Lucky Baldwin	6 F	1:16.00	$6,800	
1886	Firenze	2	Fred Littlefield	James Murphy	James B. A. Haggin	6 F	1:15.00	$6,175	
1885	Preciosa	2	Mr. Stevens	William R. Claypool	James B. A. Haggin	6 F	1:17.75	$4,400	
1884	Natalie	2	George Church		James E. Kelly	6 F	1:21.00	$4,000	
1883	Sister	2	J. Fisher	Anthony Taylor	James E. Kelly	6 F	1:17.00		
1882	Barnes	2	Jim McLaughlin	James G. Rowe Sr.	Dwyer Brothers Stable	6 F	1:19.50	$3,175	
1881	Memento	2	Tom Costello	R. Wyndham Walden	George L. Lorillard	6 F	1:17.25	$3,175	
1880	Bonnie Lizzie	2	J. Fisher	John J. Hyland	Mr. J. G. Nelson	6 F	1:22.00	$1,137	Dead heat
1880	Brambaletta	2	Erskine Henderson	Harvey Welch	Asahel Burnham	6 F	1:22.00	$1,137	Dead heat
