= Burlington (horse) =

American-bred Thoroughbred racehorse

- Sire: Powhattan
- Grandsire: Leamington
- Dam: Invercauld
- Damsire: St. Albans
- Sex: Stallion
- Foaled: 1887
- Country: United States
- Colour: Black
- Breeder: Alexander John Alexander
- Owner: Hough Brothers
- Trainer: A. Cooper
- Earnings: $44,465

Major wins
- Criterion Stakes (1889); Pelham Handicap (1889); Brooklyn Derby (1890); Tidal Stakes (1890); Trial Stakes (1890); Triple Crown wins: Belmont Stakes (1890)
- Last updated on March 9, 2022

Burlington was an American Thoroughbred racehorse best known for winning the 1890 Belmont Stakes.

== Background ==
Burlington was bred by Alexander John Alexander at Woodburn Stud in Kentucky. His sire was Powhattan, a son of leading sire Leamington, and his dam was Invercauld. He was purchased by B. Riley at the 1888 Woodburn yearling sale for $425.

== Racing career ==
As a two-year-old, Burlington started 13 times. He won the Criterion Stakes and the Pelham Handicap, and came second in the Independence Stakes, the Seabright Stakes, the Red Bank Stakes, and the August Stakes. After the two-year-old season, he was sold to the Hough Brothers.

During the three-year-old season, Burlington won the Brooklyn Derby. Fifteen days later, on June 10, 1890, he ran in the Belmont Stakes. It was the first running of the race at the Morris Park Racecourse, with the closure of the race's previous home Jerome Park Racetrack impending. The favorite out of the field of nine was Padishah, who'd shown racing promise as a two-year-old. Burlington was sent off at odds of 7-1, the sixth choice to win. Despite these longer odds, Burlington, ridden by African-American jockey Shelby "Pike" Barnes, won the race, beating second-place finisher Devotee by a length. Padishah came in third.

Just two days after the Belmont, Burlington captured the Trial Stakes at Morris Park, and won the Tidal Stakes nine days after that. That year he also came in third in the Travers Stakes. Overall, Burlington raced 36 times, and won 15 of them.

== Later life ==
After his racing career, Burlington was retired to stud, siring at least six known horses. In 1904, he was sold to J. E. Lane to stand at stud at Woodmonde and Hattondale farms in Virginia.

== Pedigree ==
Pedigree of Burlington
Sire Powhattan 1879	Leamington 1853	Faugh-a-Ballagh	Sir Hercules
Sire Powhattan 1879	Leamington 1853	Faugh-a-Ballagh	Guiccioli
Sire Powhattan 1879	Leamington 1853	Pantaloon Mare	Pantaloon*
Sire Powhattan 1879	Leamington 1853	Pantaloon Mare	Daphne
Sire Powhattan 1879	Maiden 1862	Lexington	Boston
Sire Powhattan 1879	Maiden 1862	Lexington	Alice Carneal
Sire Powhattan 1879	Maiden 1862	Kitty Clark	Glencoe*
Sire Powhattan 1879	Maiden 1862	Kitty Clark	Miss Obstinate
Dam Invercauld 1866	St Albans 1857	Stockwell	The Baron
Dam Invercauld 1866	St Albans 1857	Stockwell	Pocahontas*
Dam Invercauld 1866	St Albans 1857	Bribery	The Libel*
Dam Invercauld 1866	St Albans 1857	Bribery	Splitvote
Dam Invercauld 1866	Eleanor 1856	Voltigeur	Voltaire
Dam Invercauld 1866	Eleanor 1856	Voltigeur	Martha Lynn
Dam Invercauld 1866	Eleanor 1856	Themis	Touchstone
Dam Invercauld 1866	Eleanor 1856	Themis	Rectitude

* Burlington is inbred 4S x 5D to the stallion Pantaloon, meaning that he appears fourth generation on the sire side of his pedigree, and fifth generation (via The Libel) on the dam side of his pedigree.

* Burlington is inbred 4S x 5D to the stallion Glencoe, meaning that he appears fourth generation on the sire side of his pedigree, and fifth generation (via Pocahontas) on the dam side of his pedigree.
