= Sir Walter =

American-bred Thoroughbred racehorse

- Sire: Midlothian
- Grandsire: Strathconan
- Dam: La Scala
- Damsire: Joe Hooker
- Sex: Stallion
- Foaled: 1890
- Country: United States
- Colour: Bay
- Breeder: James B. A. Haggin
- Owner: Oneck Stable
- Trainer: Walter C. Rollins
- Record: 86: 35-19-15 (age 2-7) plus 3 wins at age 8
- Earnings: US$90,000+

Major wins
- Seaside Stakes (1892); Atlantic Stakes (1892); Seabright Stakes (1892); Great American Stakes (1892); Great Eclipse Stakes (1892); Fulton Stakes (1893); Lorillard Stakes (1893); Omnium Handicap (1893); Tidal Stakes (1893); Stevens Stakes (1893); Stockton Stakes (1893); Union Handicap (1893); Long Island Handicap (1894); Second All-Aged Serial Handicap (1894); Third All-Aged Serial Handicap (1894); Sheepshead Bay Handicap (1894); Parkway Handicap (1895); Brooklyn Handicap (1896); Municipal Handicap (1896); Midsummer Handicap (1897); Fort Hamilton Handicap (1898)

Sir Walter (foaled 1890 in California) was an outstanding American Thoroughbred racehorse known for his gritty determination which saw him win a number of races by a matter of inches.

== Background ==
Sir Walter was bred by James Ben Ali Haggin at his Rancho Del Paso near Sacramento, California who had imported his sire, Midlothian, from Great Britain. His dam was La Scala, a daughter of the important Nevada/California sire, Joe Hooker.

Sir Walter was purchased as a yearling by the Oneck Stable of Harry K. Knapp and his brother, Dr. Gideon Lee Knapp, who raced him throughout his career. He was trained by Walter Rollins, about whom the New York Times would write that he "was for thirty years one of the most successful trainers of thoroughbred racers in America."

The decade of the 1890s was a time in American Thoroughbred racing when the Kentucky Derby had lost much of its earlier importance and was often drawing a field of just three or four horses. Although there were important races in the state of Maryland, it was the New York/New Jersey circuit which attracted the best horses from across the United States and the Metropolitan, Brooklyn and Suburban Handicaps were among the top events of the racing season. There were also a number of significant stakes and handicaps on the New York racing calendar at what are today long defunct racing venues such as Morris Park Racecourse, Sheepshead Bay Race Track and Gravesend Race Track. In addition to his Brooklyn Handicap victory, Sir Walter won numerous important races which are now all but forgotten as a result of those track's closure in the early 1900s. His racing career was such that on his retirement in 1898, the New York Times called Sir Walter a "great race horse."

== Racing career ==
In his first few years of racing, Sir Walter was most often ridden by jockey Samuel Doggett. As a two-year-old, the colt won five of his eight starts and at age three won nine of twenty outings and notably running third in the 1893 Withers Stakes and fourth in the 1893 Realization Stakes. At four, he won thirteen of twenty-two starts and was second in the Manhattan Handicap. At ages five and six he won just three times but most significantly was ridden to victory by Fred Taral in the 1896 Brooklyn Handicap.

Already having beaten Keene Stables' great Champion, Domino, on October 29, 1897, a seven-year-old Sir Walter beat the four-year-old Hastings in a handicap race at Morris Park Racetrack.

At age eight, Sir Walter returned to racing but was retired in early July 1898. However, before long he returned to the track and won three more races in September and October. His career record stood as follows:

Year	Age	Starts	1st	2nd	3rd
1892	2	8	5	0	1
1893	3	20	9	4	4
1894	4	22	13	5	2
1895	5	12	1	5	4
1896	6	7	2	0	3
1897	7	17	5	5	1
1898	8	not found	3	nf	nf

== Stud record ==
In 1899, Sir Walter's owner planned to race him again but he fell ill and in September the decision was made to retire him. He was sent to stand at stud at Hal Price Headley's Beaumont Farm in Lexington, Kentucky. According to Thoroughbred Heritage, he was moderately successful as a stallion.
