= Sylvester Veitch =

American horse trainer (1910–1996)

Personal information
- Born: February 24, 1910 United States
- Died: February 14, 1996 (aged 85)
- Resting place: Greenridge Cemetery, Saratoga Springs, New York
- Occupation: Trainer

Horse racing career
- Sport: Horse racing
- Career wins: Not found

Major racing wins
- Wilson Stakes (1941); Fashion Stakes (1946); Empire City Handicap (1947); Jockey Club Gold Cup (1947, 1951); Monmouth Oaks (1947); Wood Memorial Stakes (1947, 1956); Daingerfield Handicap (1948); Blue Grass Stakes (1951); Empire City Gold Cup (1951); Metropolitan Handicap (1952); Whitney Handicap (1952); Great American Stakes (1953); Juvenile Stakes (1953); American Legion Handicap (1954); Saratoga Handicap (1954); Travers Stakes (1954); Washington, D.C. International Stakes (1954); National Stallion Stakes (filly division) (1956); Kentucky Oaks (1958); Beldame Stakes (1965); Black Helen Handicap (1966); Amory L. Haskell Handicap (1968) American Classic Race wins: Belmont Stakes (1947, 1951)

Honors
- National Museum of Racing and Hall of Fame (1977)

Significant horses
- First Flight, Phalanx, Counterpoint, Fisherman, Mameluke, Career Boy, Vulcan's Forge, What a Treat
- Updated on August 21, 2020

Sylvester E. "Syl" Veitch (February 24, 1910 – February 14, 1996) was a Hall of Fame thoroughbred horse trainer.

He was the son of Silas Veitch, a jockey and trainer who began his career as an exercise boy with the powerful Joseph E. Seagram stable in his native Canada and who would become a successful steeplechase trainer in the United States. Sylvester Veitch followed in his father's footsteps and also began his career in racing as a jockey and trainer in steeplechase racing. In 1939 he moved to flat racing when he was employed as a trainer with Cornelius Vanderbilt Whitney in Kentucky. He won two Belmont Stakes while in Whitney's employment, one in 1947 with Phalanx and the second in 1951 with Counterpoint.

In 1958 he left his position with C. V. Whitney and began employment with George D. Widener Jr. where he trained What a Treat, and many other notable horses. In 1971, after Widener's death, Sylvester Veitch opened his own public stable. He was inducted into the National Museum of Racing and Hall of Fame in 1977.

Among his accomplishments, Sylvester Veitch held the single-season mark of 24 wins in 24 days set in 1954 at Saratoga Race Course, a record that held until 2003. In the course of his career he had forty-four stakes winners. He trained 5 champions in all: First Flight in 1946, Phalanx in 1947, Counterpoint in 1951, Career Boy in 1956, and What a Treat in 1965.

Sylvester Veitch died at the age of 85 at the Winthrop Hospital in Mineola, Long Island, New York in February 1996 after a brief illness. His son, John M. Veitch, was also a successful trainer.
