= Otto Wonderly =

Canadian jockey

- Wonderly and Gold Heels at 1902 Suburban Handicap.

Personal information
- Born: c. 1878 Ontario, Canada
- Died: April 2, 1905 (aged about 26) Memphis, Tennessee, United States
- Occupation: Jockey

Horse racing career
- Sport: Horse racing
- Career wins: not found

Major racing wins
- Belle Meade Stakes (1901); Bronx Highweight Handicap (1901); Manhattan Handicap (1901); Municipal Handicap (1901); Patchogue Stakes (1901); Atlantic Stakes (1902); Autumn Maiden Stakes (1902); Bay Ridge Handicap (1902); Laureate Stakes (1902); Queens County Handicap (1902); Spindrift Stakes (1902); Suburban Handicap (1902); Coronation Futurity Stakes (1904); Canadian Derby (1904); Victoria Stakes (1904)

Significant horses
- Flocarline, Fort Hunter, Gold Heels

Otto Wonderly (c. 1878 - April 2, 1905) was a Canadian Thoroughbred horse racing jockey from Ontario who competed in his native Canada and in the United States where he died from a racetrack accident.

Before embarking on a riding career, Wonderly worked as a newsboy for the Grand Trunk Railway. He was riding at a track in Windsor, Ontario when some prominent Canadian horsemen recognized his natural talent and arranged for him to go to the United States. There, he was placed under contract by James Ben Ali Haggin, one of America's preeminent horsemen and owner of the renowned Elmendorf Farm in Lexington, Kentucky. Haggin paid Wonderly $15,000 for second call on his services for eight months. He would later ride for a Chicago based stable and as well would ride in the United States and Canada for leading Canadian owner, Joseph E. Seagram.

== Career highlights ==
On July 25, 1901, Wonderly won four races in a row on a six-race card at Fort Erie Racetrack. Another highlight of Wonderly's career came on June 14, 1902 at the Sheepshead Bay Race Track in Brooklyn, New York when he won the most prestigious race in the United States for horses of all ages. For owners Fred C. McLewee and Diamond Jim Brady, Wonderly captured the famous Suburban Handicap aboard Gold Heels in race record time on an off track in front of more than 50,000 spectators.

== Death ==
Riding freelance in 1905, on April 1 Wonderly was exercising a horse at Montgomery Park Race Track in Memphis, Tennessee when he was thrown to the ground that caused severe head injuries.

He died the following day St. Joseph's Hospital. His body was shipped to his family in London, Ontario for interment.
