= Walter C. Rollins =

American Thoroughbred racehorse trainer (1857–1908)

Walter Rollins
Personal information
- Born: 1857 Lexington, Kentucky, United States
- Died: January 18, 1908 (aged 50–51)
- Occupation: Trainer / Owner

Horse racing career
- Sport: Horse racing
- Career wins: Not found

Major racing wins
- Saratoga Cup (1883, 1884); Suburban Handicap (1884); Great American Stakes (1892); Eclipse Stakes (1892); Lorillard Stakes (1893); Tidal Stakes (1893); Foam Stakes (1894); June Stakes (1894); Long Island Handicap (1894); Vernal Stakes (1894); Brooklyn Handicap (1896); Autumn Cup (1896); Carter Handicap (1896); Municipal Handicap (1896); Russet Stakes (1896); Junior Champion Stakes (1898); Expectation Stakes (1899); Ladies Handicap (1900); Merchants and Citizens Handicap (1901, 1902); Occidental Handicap (1901, 1902); Twin City Handicap (1901)

Significant horses
- General Monroe, Sir Walter, Herbert, Deerslayer

Walter Childs Rollins (1857 – January 18, 1908) was an American Thoroughbred racehorse trainer about whom the New York Times said "was for thirty years one of the most successful trainers of thoroughbred racers in America."

== Early life ==
Born in Lexington, Kentucky, Walter Rollins first worked in the racing industry as a stable hand for H. Price McGrath, owner of McGrathiana Stud. He was a jockey for a time but met with limited success.

== Training career ==
As a trainer, Rollins spent the majority of his career at racetracks in the New York/New Jersey area, making his home in The Bronx, New York. His first major success came with the colt General Monroe with whom he won the 1883 and 1884 editions of the Saratoga Cup and the inaugural running of the Suburban Handicap in 1884.

Walter Rollins trained for prominent owners such as Norman Kittson, Pierre Lorillard IV, and the Oneck Stable of Harry K. Knapp and his brother, Dr. Gideon Lee Knapp. Rollins' most famous horse was Oneck Stable's Sir Walter. He also owned some of the horses he trained, notably Deerslayer, winner of the 1896 Carter Handicap and Autumn Cup, as well as Herbert, who won back-to-back runnings of the Merchants and Citizens Handicap in 1901 and 1902.

== Retirement ==
Plagued by health problems, by 1901 Rollins had hired trainer Robert Healey to assist him and then retired in 1903 at age forty-six. In the fall of 1908, Mrs. Rollins died. Despondent over her loss and his own failing health, Walter Rollins killed himself. He was living in The Bronx, New York near the Jerome Park Racetrack at the time of his death.
