= Hal Price Headley =

Farmer, racehorse owner/breeder, racetrack owner/executive, philanthropist

- Born: December 19, 1888; Lexington, Kentucky, United States
- Died: March 22, 1962 (aged 73); Lexington, Kentucky, United States
- Resting place: Lexington Cemetery
- Education: Princeton University
- Occupations: Farmer, racehorse owner/breeder, racetrack owner/executive, philanthropist
- Known for: Beaumont Farm, Keeneland
- Board member of: Keeneland
- Spouses: Martha Sharkey Withers (1889–1922); Genevieve Morgan Molloy (1897–1987)
- Children: 6
- Honors: Keeneland Mark of Distinction (1968); U.S. Racing Hall of Fame: Pillars of the Turf (2018)

Hal Price Headley (December 19, 1888 – March 22, 1962) was an American owner and breeder of Thoroughbred racehorses and a founder of Keeneland who served as the race track's president from 1935 to 1951. He owned the 4,000 acre Beaumont Farm on Harrodsburg Road at the western edge of Lexington, Kentucky as well as the 15,000-acre Pinebloom Plantation in Baker County, Georgia.

Hal Price Headley was one of those profiled by racing historian Edward L. Bowen in his 2003 book Legacies of the Turf : A Century of Great Thoroughbred Breeders.

In 2018, Hal Price Headley was posthumously inducted into the National Museum of Racing and Hall of Fame as one of the "Pillars of the Turf". The honor is for those "who have made extraordinary contributions to Thoroughbred racing in a leadership or pioneering capacity at the highest national level."
