= Harry K. Knapp =

American businessman

- Born: September 25, 1864
- Died: January 31, 1926 (aged 61)
- Education: Columbia University
- Political party: Republican
- Board member of: Corn Exchange Bank, The Jockey Club
- Spouse: Caroline Burr
- Children: 3

Harry Kearsarge Knapp (September 25, 1864 – January 31, 1926) was a United States financier and a prominent executive in the Thoroughbred horse racing industry in which he had been a steward, secretary-treasurer and vice-chairman of The Jockey Club.

A graduate of Columbia University, he was a partner with George Hyatt and John S. Van Siclen in the New York City stock brokerage firm, Hyatt & Co. and later a partner in Benedict Drysdale & Co. Harry Knapp was also a director of the Corn Exchange Bank of New York and was the head of the Racquet and Tennis Club.

Harry Knapp married Caroline Burr with whom he had three children. They made their home in New York City and in 1903 built Brookwood Hall, a summer home on more than 100 acres (0.40 km^{2}) at East Islip, on Long Island, New York, now being used as the Islip Art Museum.

== Oneck Stable ==
Harry Knapp became involved in the sport of Thoroughbred racing, operating with his brother, Dr. Gideon Lee Knapp, under the nom de course, Oneck Stable. They owned a number of successful horses, among the best known of which were Sir Walter, winner of the 1896 Brooklyn Handicap and Fashion Plate, winner of the 1910 Metropolitan Handicap.

Walter Rollins was a long-time trainer for the Oneck Stable and was succeeded by William Karrick.

Knapp was a member of the board of directors and a vice-chairman of The Jockey Club and a director of the Saratoga Racing Association. In 1906, New York governor Frank W. Higgins appointed him chairman of the New York State Racing Commission.

Poor health forced Harry Knapp to step down from his various racing positions in 1925 and he died on February 1, 1926. In May, his racing stable was sold at auction at Belmont Park. His son Theodore served as president of the Queens County Jockey Club from 1941 until his death in 1947. The Queens County Jockey Club owned and operated the Aqueduct Racetrack.
