= Clark Stakes =

Grade II Thoroughbred horse race

- Class: Grade II
- Location: Churchill Downs; Louisville, Kentucky, United States
- Inaugurated: 1875
- Race type: Thoroughbred – Flat racing
- Website: www.churchilldowns.com

Race information
- Distance: 1 1/8 miles (9 furlongs)
- Surface: Dirt
- Track: left-handed
- Qualification: Three-years-old & up
- Weight: Assigned
- Purse: $750,000 (2021)

The Clark Stakes is an American Thoroughbred horse race held annually in late November at Churchill Downs in Louisville, Kentucky. Among the oldest races in the United States, it was first run in 1875, the year the racetrack opened for business. Currently a Grade II event, it is open to horses age three and older and is contested on dirt over a distance of 1 1/8 miles (9 furlongs). It was known as the Clark Handicap through 2018 before the race conditions were changed to set weights and allowances in 2019.

The race is named in honor of Colonel M. Lewis Clark, founder of the Louisville Jockey Club which built Churchill Downs.

Through 1901, it was restricted to three-year-old horses.

Since inception, the Clark Handicap has been run at various distances:

- 2 miles : 1875–1880
- 1 1/4 miles : 1881–1895
- 1 1/8 miles : 1896–1901, 1922–1924, 1955–present
- 1 1/16 miles : 1902–1921, 1925–1954

The race was run in two divisions in 1953.

== Records ==
Speed record: (at current distance of 1 1/8 miles)

- 1:47.28 – Victory Gallop (12 June, 1999)

Most wins

- 2 – Hodge (1915, 1916)
- 2 – Bold Favorite (1968, 1969)
- 2 – Bob's Dusty (1977, 1978)

Most wins by a jockey

- 4 – Isaac Burns Murphy (1879, 1884,1885, 1890)
- 4 – Pat Day (1984, 1985, 1990, 2000)

Most wins by a trainer

- 3 – Ben A. Jones (1942, 1946, 1951)
- 3 – Smiley Adams (1977, 1978, 1979)
- 3 – Bob Baffert (1996, 1998, 2014)

Most Wins by an owner

- 3 – Robert N. Lehmann (1977, 1978, 1979)

== Winners ==
Year	Winner	Age	Jockey	Trainer	Owner	Distance (Miles)	Time	Win $	Gr.
2025	Magnitude	3	Jose Ortiz	Steven M. Asmussen	Winchell Thoroughbreds LLC (Ron Winchell)	1-1/8 m	1:48.69	$360,700	G2
2024	Rattle N Roll	5	Brian Hernandez Jr.	Kenneth G. McPeek	Lucky Seven Stable (Mackin family)	1-1/8 m	1:49.60		
2023	Trademark	4	Fernando De La Cruz	Victoria H. Oliver	BBN Racing	1-1/8 m	1:49.95		
2022	Proxy	4	Joel Rosario	Michael H. Stidham	Godolphin	1-1/8 m	1:48.89		
2021	Maxfield	4	Jose Ortiz	Brendan Walsh	Godolphin	1-1/8 m	1:48.97		
2020	Bodexpress	4	Rafael Bejarano	Gustavo Delgado	Top Racing LLC	1-1/8 m	1:49.12		
2019	Tom's d'Etat	6	Joel Rosario	Albert Stall Jr.	G M B Racing	1-1/8 m	1:48.84		
2018	Leofric	5	Florent Geroux	Brad H. Cox	Steve Landers	1-1/8 m	1:48.59		
2017	Seeking the Soul	4	John Velazquez	Dallas Stewart	Charles Fipke	1-1/8 m	1:48.88		
2016	Gun Runner	3	Florent Geroux	Steven M. Asmussen	Winchell Thoroughbreds & Three Chimneys Farm	1-1/8 m	1:48.50		
2015	Effinex	4	Mike E. Smith	James A. Jerkens	Tri-Bone Stables	1-1/8 m	1:48.92		
2014	Hoppertunity	3	Martin Garcia	Bob Baffert	Michael Watson, Mike Pegram & Paul Weitman	1-1/8 m	1:49.88		
2013	Will Take Charge	3	Luis Saez	D. Wayne Lukas	Willis D. Horton	1-1/8 m	1:49.39		
2012	Shackleford	4	Jesus Castanon	Dale L. Romans	Michael Lauffer & Bill Cubbedge	1-1/8 m	1:49.12		
2011	Wise Dan	4	John Velazquez	Charles Lopresti	Morton Fink	1-1/8 m	1:48.95		
2010‡	Giant Oak	4	Shaun Bridgmohan	Chris M. Block	Virginia H. Tarra Trust	1-1/8 m	1:50.82		
2009	Blame	3	Jamie Theriot	Albert Stall Jr.	Adele Dilschneider & Claiborne Farm	1-1/8 m	1:49.39		
2008	Einstein	6	Julien Leparoux	Helen Pitts-Blasi	M. L. Garretson, trustee	1-1/8 m	1:49.79		
2007	A. P. Arrow	5	Ramon Dominguez	Todd Pletcher	Allen E. Paulson LT	1-1/8 m	1:48.66		
2006	Premium Tap	4	Kent Desormeaux	John C. Kimmel	George Kline, Peter Alevizos & David Whelihan	1-1/8 m	1:47.39		
2005	Magna Graduate	3	John Velazquez	Todd Pletcher	Elisabeth Alexander	1-1/8 m	1:50.89		
2004	Saint Liam	4	Edgar Prado	Richard E. Dutrow Jr.	M/M William K. Warren Jr.	1-1/8 m	1:50.81		
2003†	Quest	4	Javier Castellano	Nick Zito	A. B. Hancock III & G. F. Healy	1-1/8 m	1:52.42		
2002	Lido Palace	5	Jorge F. Chavez	Robert J. Frankel	John & Jerry Amerman	1-1/8 m	1:49.13		
2001	Ubiquity	4	Craig Perret	William I. Mott	Mary & Gary West	1-1/8 m	1:48.26		
2000	Surfside	3	Pat Day	D. Wayne Lukas	Overbrook Farm	1-1/8 m	1:48.75		
1999	Littlebitlively	5	Calvin Borel	Bobby Barnett	John A. Franks	1-1/8 m	1:50.88		
1998	Silver Charm	4	Gary Stevens	Bob Baffert	Bob & Beverly Lewis	1-1/8 m	1:49.00		
1997	Concerto	3	Jerry Bailey	William I. Mott	Kinsman Stable	1-1/8 m	1:49.60		
1996	Isitingood	5	David Flores	Bob Baffert	Mike Pegram & Terry Henn	1-1/8 m	1:48.80		
1995	Judge T C	4	Joe Johnson	Gary G. Hartlage	Bea & Robert H. Roberts	1-1/8 m	1:49.80		
1994	Sir Vixen	6	Dean Kutz	Mark Danner	Mark & Vickie Copass	1-1/8 m	1:51.20		
1993	Mi Cielo	3	Mike E. Smith	Peter M. Vestal	Thomas M. Carey	1-1/8 m	1:51.40		
1992	Zeeruler	4	Garrett Gomez	Donnie K. Von Hemel	John A. Franks	1-1/8 m	1:50.00		
1991	Out of Place	4	Herb McCauley	Claude R. McGaughey III	Cynthia Phipps	1-1/8 m	1:52.20		
1990	Secret Hello	3	Pat Day	Frank L. Brothers	Lazy Lane Farm	1-1/8 m	1:50.60		
1989	No Marker	5	Danny Cox	Patti Johnson	Billy Ray Gowdy	1-1/8 m	1:51.20		
1988	Balthazar B.	5	Kent Desormeaux	Paul J. McGee	Paul J. McGee et al.	1-1/8 m	1:51.20		
1987	Intrusion	5	Larry Melancon	Lee J. Rossi	Carl J. Maggio	1-1/8 m	1:51.40		
1986	Come Summer	4	Patrick Johnson	George R. Arnold II	Surf & Turf Stable	1-1/8 m	1:49.80		
1985	Hopeful Word	3	Pat Day	Carl Bowman	M. Clifton, R. Doll & B. Morris	1-1/8 m	1:51.00		
1984	Eminency	6	Pat Day	Claude R. McGaughey III	Happy Valley Farm	1-1/8 m	1:49.00		
1983	Jack Slade	3	James McKnight	David Kassen	Andrew Adams	1-1/8 m	1:49.80		
1982	Hechizado	6	Randy Romero	Ray Lawrence Jr.	Charles Schmidt Jr.	1-1/8 m	1:52.20		
1981	Withholding	4	Larry Melancon	Ronnie Warren	M/M Russell Michael Jr.	1-1/8 m	1:52.00		
1980	Sun Catcher	3	Don Brumfield	Dianne Carpenter	Sundance Stable & D. Nedeff	1-1/8 m	1:53.40		
1979	Lot o' Gold	3	Julio Espinoza	Smiley Adams	Robert N. Lehmann	1-1/8 m	1:50.80		
1978	Bob's Dusty	4	Richard dePass	Smiley Adams	Robert N. Lehmann	1-1/8 m	1:50.20		
1977	Bob's Dusty	3	Richard dePass	Smiley Adams	Robert N. Lehmann	1-1/8 m	1:49.80		
1976	Yamanin	4	Garth Patterson	George T. Poole	Hajima Doi	1-1/8 m	1:54.40		
1975	Warbucks	5	Larry Melancon	Don Combs	Edward E. Elzemeyer	1-1/8 m	1:54.40		
1974	Mr. Door	3	William Gavidia	Thomas W. Kelley	Bromagen Cattle Co. et al.	1-1/8 m	1:52.20		
1973	Golden Don	3	Mike Manganello	Oscar Dishman	Archie Donaldson	1-1/8 m	1:52.80		
1972	Fairway Flyer	3	David Whited	John J. Greely III	William Floyd	1-1/8 m	1:53.80		
1971	Sado	4	Don Brumfield	Harold Tinker	W. Cal Partee	1-1/8 m	1:53.60		
1970	Watch Fob	5	Danny Gargan	George T. Poole	C. V. Whitney	1-1/8 m	1:51.20		
1969	Bold Favorite	4	Doug Richard	Del W. Carroll	Michael Grace Phipps	1-1/8 m	1:50.40		
1968	Bold Favorite	3	Robert Nono	Del W. Carroll	Michael Grace Phipps	1-1/8 m	1:49.20		
1967	Random Shot	4	Billy Phelps	James R. Cowden Jr.	James R. Cowden Sr.	1-1/8 m	1:50.80		
1966	Flick II	4	Hector Pilar	Larry H. Thompson	Alamode Farm	1-1/8 m	1:49.60		
1965	Big Brigade	4	Jimmy Nichols	Edgar S. Brumfield	M/M Robert F. Roberts	1-1/8 m	1:50.80		
1964	Lemon Twist	4	Billy Phelps	Peter C. Keiser	Theodore D. Buhl	1-1/8 m	1:50.60		
1963	Copy Chief	3	Don Brumfield	S. Bryant Ott	Fourth Estate Stable	1-1/8 m	1:49.20		
1962	Crimson Satan	3	Herb Hinojosa	Charley Kerr	Crimson King Farm	1-1/8 m	1:50.00		
1961	Aeroflint	3	Eugene Curry	Keneth G. Hall	Mrs. Raymond Bauer	1-1/8 m	1:48.40		
1960	Counterate	3	John L. Rotz	John J. Greely III	Cornelius V. Whitney	1-1/8 m	1:49.00		
1959	Las Olas	4	Fred A. Smith III	Charles E. Eads	Harry N. Eads	1-1/8 m	1:48.40		
1958	My Night Out	5	John L. Rotz	John J. Gavin Jr.	Wells Bros.	1-1/8 m	1:50.00		
1957	Ezgo	3	John Delahoussaye	Larry H. Thompson	Larry H. Thompson	1-1/8 m	1:50.80		
1956	Swoon's Son	3	David Erb	Lex Wilson	E. Gay Drake	1-1/8 m	1:50.60		
1955	Happy Go Lucky	6	Lois C. Cook	Harold G. Bockman	Harold G. Bockman	1-1/8 m	1:51.60		
1954	Bay Bloom	5	J. King	Fred H. Pohl	Fred H. Pohl	1-1/16 m	1:44.00		
1953-1	Chombro	6	Lois C. Cook	John Hanover	D. J. Gleason	1-1/16 m	1:45.60		
1953-2	Second Avenue	6	Carroll Bierman	Lex Wilson	Theodore D. Buhl	1-1/16 m	1:45.60		
1952	Seaward	7	Kenneth Church	Harry Trotsek	Hasty House Farm	1-1/16 m	1:44.40		
1951	Wistful	5	Douglas Dodson	Ben A. Jones	Calumet Farm	1-1/16 m	1:44.00		
1950	Mount Marcy	5	Steve Brooks	Sylvester Veitch	Cornelius V. Whitney	1-1/16 m	1:44.60		
1949	Shy Guy	4	Conn McCreary	Jack C. Hodgins	Dixiana	1-1/16 m	1:45.20		
1948	Star Reward	4	Steve Brooks	Jack C. Hodgins	Dixiana	1-1/16 m	1:46.60		
1947	Jack S. L.	7	Steve Brooks	William Resseguet	Mrs. J. S. Letellier	1-1/16 m	1:49.60		
1946	Hail Victory	4	Douglas Dodson	Ben A. Jones	Calumet Farm	1-1/16 m	1:47.80		
1945	Sentiment Sake	4	Fred Wirth	Milton Rieser	Wathen R. Knebelkamp	1-1/16 m	1:47.20		
1944	Alquest	4	Johnny Adams	Jack H. Skirvin	Ernst Farm	1-1/16 m	1:45.20		
1943	Anticlimax	4	Carroll Bierman	Knox Osborne	Hal Price Headley	1-1/16 m	1:46.00		
1942	Whirlaway	4	Wendell Eads	Ben A. Jones	Calumet Farm	1-1/16 m	1:44.80		
1941	Haltal	4	Conn McCreary	Steve Judge	Woodvale Farm	1-1/16 m	1:44.80		
1940	Up the Creek	4	G. Wallace	Roy Waldron	Milky Way Farm	1-1/16 m	1:46.00		
1939	Arabs Arrow	5	Carroll Bierman	Gilbert Hardy	Louise J. Hickman	1-1/16 m	1:45.80		
1938	Main Man	4	Willis F. Ward	Howard Hoffman	Jerome B. Respess	1-1/16 m	1:46.80		
1937	Count Morse	4	Irving Anderson	Frank J. Kearns	Calumet Farm	1-1/16 m	1:45.20		
1936	Corinto	4	Charley Kurtsinger	Bert S. Michell	Mrs. Emil Denemark	1-1/16 m	1:44.80		
1935	Beaver Dam	3	R. Montgomery	George Gould	T. S. & J. S. Mulvihill	1-1/16 m	1:47.40		
1934	Esseff	4	Lee Humphries	Clyde Van Dusen	Dixiana	1-1/16 m	1:44.00		
1933	Osculator	4	Silvio Coucci	Joseph H. Stotler	William R. Coe	1-1/16 m	1:45.40		
1932	Pittsburgher	4	Charles Corbett	Jim H. Moody	Shady Brook Farm	1-1/16 m	1:50.20		
1931	Bargello	5	K. Russell	Mose Goldblatt	Cornelius V. Whitney	1-1/16 m	1:44.80		
1930	Stars and Bars	4	Leo Jones	Edward Haughton	Greentree Stable	1-1/16 m	1:47.40		
1929	Martie Flynn	4	Carl Meyer	Robert V. McGarvey	Stuyvesant Peabody	1-1/16 m	1:46.60		
1928	Jock	4	Eddie Ambrose	John F. Schorr	John W. Schorr	1-1/16 m	1:45.00		
1927	Helen's Babe	4	Walter Lilley	Walter W. Taylor	NF	1-1/16 m	1:46.00		
1926	San-utar	5	Mack Garner	Peter W. Coyne	James W. Corrigan	1-1/16 m	1:45.40		
1925	Spic and Span	4	George Fields	Harry M. Unna	J. C. McGill	1-1/16 m	1:47.60		
1924	Chilhowee	3	G. Harvey	John C. Gallaher	John & Allen Gallaher	1-1/8 m	1:54.40		
1923	Audacious	7	Bert Kennedy	Auval John Baker	Wilfrid Viau	1-1/8 m	1:54.60		
1922	Exterminator	7	Albert Johnson	Eugene Wayland	Willis Sharpe Kilmer	1-1/8 m	1:50.00		
1921	Ginger	5	T. Murray	Kay Spence	Herbert H. Hewitt	1-1/16 m	1:45.00		
1920	Boniface	5	Earl Sande	H. Guy Bedwell	J. K. L. Ross	1-1/16 m	1:45.80		
1919	Midway	5	Harold Thurber	John S. Ward	James W. Parrish	1-1/16 m	1:46.60		
1918	Beaverkill	4	O. Willis	S. Miller Henderson	Ogden Stable	1-1/16 m	1:48.20		
1917	Old Rosebud	6	Danny Connelly	Frank D. Weir	F. D. Weir & H. C. Applegate	1-1/16 m	1:45.20		
1916	Hodge	5	Claude Hunt	Kay Spence	W. J. Weber	1-1/16 m	1:45.40		
1915	Hodge	4	Charles Borel	Kay Spence	W. J. Weber	1-1/16 m	1:44.60		
1914	Belloc	3	Albert Mott	Ed Cunningham	James MacManus	1-1/16 m	1:45.00		
1913	Buckhorn	4	Roscoe Goose	Jack D. Adkins	Rod J. MacKenzie	1-1/16 m	1:48.20		
1912	Adams Express	4	Carroll H. Shilling	Frank M. Taylor	Harry C. Hallenbeck	1-1/16 m	1:45.20		
1911	Star Charter	3	J. Wilson	G. M. Johnson	John W. Schorr	1-1/16 m	1:47.80		
1910	King's Daughter	7	Ted Koerner	George Denny	Thomas C. McDowell	1-1/16 m	1:45.60		
1909	Miami	3	Matt McGee	W. L. Lewis	Johnson N. Camden Jr.	1-1/16 m	1:45.20		
1908	Polly Prim	5	Vincent Powers	Fred Luzader	J. R. Wainwright	1-1/16 m	1:58.80		
1907	The Minks	4	Dave Nicol	W. Wells	NF	1-1/16 m	1:50.80		
1906	Hyperion II	3	W. McIntyre	Joseph S. Hawkins	Joseph S. Hawkins & Co.	1-1/16 m	1:49.00		
1905	Batts	4	Dave Nicol	Richard P. Brooks	William F. Schulte	1-1/16 m	1:53.75		
1904	Colonial Girl	5	Lucien Lyne	Charles E. Rowe	Charles E. Rowe	1-1/16 m	1:48.75		
1903	Love Labor	6	Scully	A. Hazlett	NF	1-1/16 m	1:48.00		
1902	Death	7	John Slack	H. Robinson	NF	1-1/16 m	1:47.00		
1901	His Eminence	3	James Winkfield	Frank B. Van Meter	Frank B. Van Meter	1-1/8 m	1:55.00		
1900	Lieut. Gibson	3	Jimmy Boland	Charles H. Hughes	Charles Smith	1-1/8 m	1:54.00		
1899	Corsini	3	Nash Turner	Edward C. Corrigan	Edward C. Corrigan	1-1/8 m	2:01.60		
1898	Plaudit	3	Robert Williams	John E. Madden	John E. Madden	1-1/8 m	1:56.50		
1897	Ornament	3	Alonzo Clayton	Charles T. Patterson	C. T. Patterson & Co.	1-1/8 m	1:55.00		
1896	Ben Eder	3	Willie Simms	NF	Hot Springs Stable	1-1/8 m	1:56.50		
1895	Halma	3	James Perkins	Byron McClelland	Byron McClelland	1-1/4 m	2:15.50		
1894	Chant	3	William Martin	H. Eugene Leigh	Leigh & Robert L. Rose	1-1/4 m	2:19.50		
1893	Boundless	3	Eddie Kunze	William Lee McDaniel	John E. Cushing & John W. Orth	1-1/4 m	2:12.00		
1892	Azra	3	Alonzo Clayton	John H. Morris	Bashford Manor Stable	1-1/4 m	2:20.00		
1891	High Tariff	3	Monk Overton	NF	Augustus Eastin & Samuel E. Larabie	1-1/4 m	2:12.00		
1890	Riley	3	Isaac Burns Murphy	Edward C. Corrigan	Edward C. Corrigan	1-1/4 m	2:16.25		
1889	Spokane	3	Thomas Kiley	John Rodegap	Noah Armstrong	1-1/4 m	2:12.50		
1888	Gallifet	3	Andrew McCarthy Jr.	NF	Melbourne Stable	1-1/4 m	2:15.25		
1887	Jim Gore	3	L. Jones	NF	A. G. McCampbell	1-1/4 m	2:11.25		
1886	Blue Wing	3	Edward Garrison	NF	Melbourne Stable	1-1/4 m	2:10.00		
1885	Bersan	3	Isaac Burns Murphy	Green B. Morris	Green B. Morris & James D. Patton	1-1/4 m	2:09.25		
1884	Buchanan	3	Isaac Burns Murphy	William Bird	William Cottrill	1-1/4 m	2:12.00		
1883	Ascender	3	John Stoval	J. Pate	R. C. Pate	1-1/4 m	2:18.00		
1882	Runnymede	3	Jim McLaughlin	James G. Rowe Sr.	Dwyer Bros. Stable	1-1/4 m	2:15.50		
1881	Hindoo	3	Jim McLaughlin	James G. Rowe Sr.	Dwyer Bros. Stable	1-1/4 m	2:10.25		
1880	Kinkead	3	Jim McLaughlin	NF	R. H. Owens	2 m	3:37.75		
1879	Falsetto	3	Isaac Burns Murphy	Eli Jordan	J. W. Hunt Reynolds	2 m	3:40.50		
1878	Leveller	3	Robert Swim	NF	R. H. Owens	2 m	3:37.00		
1877	McWhirter	3	C. Miller	Abraham Perry	Abraham Buford II	2 m	3:30.50		
1876	Creedmore	3	Howard D. Williams	NF	Williams & Owings	2 m	3:34.75	$2,150	
1875	Voltigeur	3	McGrath	B. Green	W. G. Harding	2 m	3:30.75	$1,425	

† In 2003, Evening Attire won the race but was disqualified for interference in the stretch and set back to second.
‡ In 2010, Successful Dan won the race but was disqualified and placed third for interference.
