= Bashford =

Bashford is both a surname and a given name. Notable people with the name include:

- Alison Bashford (born 1963), scholar of the global histories of science, with particular interest in the modern histories of gender and colonialism
- Coles Bashford (1816–1878), American lawyer and politician, the fifth Governor of Wisconsin
- Gordon Bashford (1916–1991), British car design engineer
- Henry Howarth Bashford (1880–1961), distinguished English physician, becoming doctor to George VI
- James Whitford Bashford (1849–1919), bishop of the Methodist Episcopal Church in the USA, the first bishop of the Methodist Episcopal Church in China
- John Bashford, British sports shooter
- Katherine Bashford, American landscape designer
- Robert McKee Bashford (1845–1911), American politician and jurist from Wisconsin
- William Benjamin Bashford (1875–1955), English-born merchant, farmer and political figure in Saskatchewan
- Bashford Dean (1867–1928), American zoologist, specializing in ichthyology, and an expert in medieval armour

== See also ==
- Bashford Manor, Louisville, neighborhood in Louisville, Kentucky, USA
- Bashford Manor Mall, enclosed mall in Bashford Manor, Louisville, Kentucky
- Bashford Manor Stable, American Thoroughbred racing and breeding operation in Louisville, Kentucky
- Bashford Manor Stakes, six furlong sprint for two-year-old thoroughbred horses during the Spring meet at Churchill Downs
- Robert M. Bashford House, located in Madison, Wisconsin, United States
- Wilkes Bashford, upscale store for women and men in the Union Square Shopping District in San Francisco, California
- Basford (disambiguation)
- Blashford
