= 1892 Kentucky Derby =

Horse race

18th Kentucky Derby
- Kentucky Derby
- Grade I stakes race
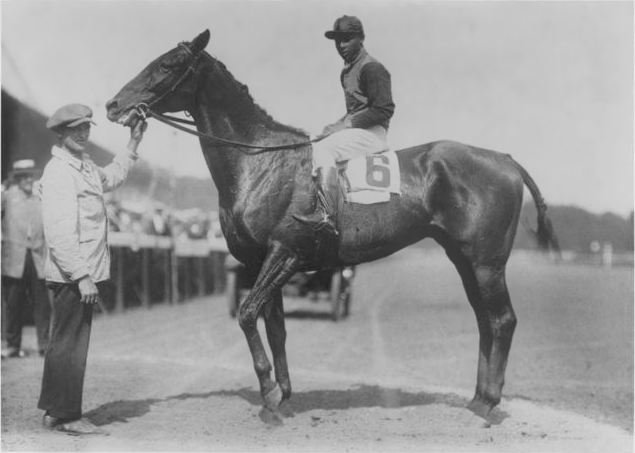
- Azra, winner of the 1892 Kentucky Derby
- Location: Churchill Downs
- Date: May 11, 1892
- Winning horse: Azra
- Jockey: Alonzo Clayton
- Trainer: John H. Morris
- Owner: Bashford Manor Stable
- Surface: Dirt

The 1892 Kentucky Derby was the 18th running of the Kentucky Derby. The race took place on May 11, 1892.

== Full results ==
Finished	Post	Horse	Jockey	Trainer	Owner	Time / behind
1st	2	Azra	Alonzo Clayton	John H. Morris	Bashford Manor Stable	2:41.50
2nd	3	Huron	Tommy Britton		Edward C. Corrigan	Nose
3rd	1	Phil Dwyer	Monk Overton		Edward C. Corrigan	6

- Winning breeder: George J. Long (KY)

== Payout ==
- The winner received a purse of $4,230.
- Second place received $300.
- Third place received $150.
