= 1895 Kentucky Derby =

Horse race

21st Kentucky Derby
- Kentucky Derby
- Grade I stakes race
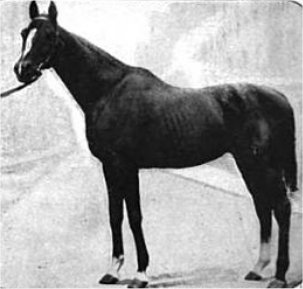
- 1895 Kentucky Derby winner Halma, c. 1907
- Location: Churchill Downs
- Date: May 6, 1895
- Distance: 1 1/2 miles (12 furlongs)
- Winning horse: Halma
- Jockey: James Perkins
- Trainer: Byron McClelland
- Owner: Byron McClelland
- Surface: Dirt

The 1895 Kentucky Derby was the 21st running of the Kentucky Derby. The race took place on May 6, 1895. It was the last Kentucky Derby race that was run at a distance of 1 1/2 miles (2.4 km). In 1896, the race was shortened to 1 1/4 miles (2.0 km), which has remained as the current race length.

== Full results ==
Finished	Post	Horse	Jockey	Trainer	Owner	Time / behind
1st	3	Halma	James Perkins	Byron McClelland	Byron McClelland	2:37.50
2nd	2	Basso	William Martin	Charles H. Hughes	Charles H. Smith	5
3rd	1	Laureate	Alonzo Clayton		Pastime Stable	4
4th	4	Curator	Monk Overton		Bashford Manor Stable	5

- Winning Breeder: Augustus Eastin & Samuel E. Larabie; (KY)

== Payout ==
- The winner received a purse of $2,970.
- Second place received $300.
- Third place received $150.
- Fourth place received $100.
