= James "Soup" Perkins =

American jockey, Kentucky Derby winner (1879–1911)

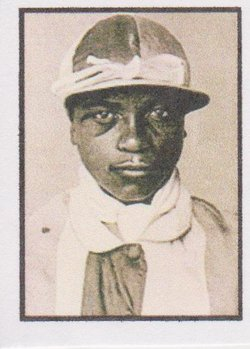

Personal information
- Full name: James Perkins
- Nickname: Soup
- Born: February 28, 1879 Lexington, Kentucky
- Died: August 10, 1911 (aged 32) Hamilton, Ontario
- Resting place: African Cemetery #2, Lexington, Kentucky; 38°3′00.5″N 84°28′41″W
- Occupations: Jockey, trainer, horse owner
- Weight: 90 lb (40.82 kg)
- Spouse: Frankie Perkins

Horse racing career
- Sport: Horse racing

Major racing wins
- 1895 Kentucky Derby, Phoenix Stakes

Significant horses
- Halma

James "Soup" Perkins (February 28, 1879 – August 10, 1911) was born in Lexington, Kentucky, the son of former slaves. He and his entire family were involved in horse racing, training, and working in the stables. Perkins was the second youngest jockey ever to win the Kentucky Derby and the winningest jockey in America in 1895. At the peak of his career he earned $10,000 per year, the equivalent of $346,000 in 2022 US dollars and was written about in newspapers throughout the United States and Canada. He died at the age of thirty-three from a heart attack while working in Hamilton, Ontario, Canada.

== Early life ==
Perkins was the third son and fifth child of John Jacob Perkins and Mattie Maupins, both of whom were born as enslaved people held captive by Major Victor Monroe Flournoy in Fayette County, Kentucky. Perkins was born February 28, 1879, in Lexington, Kentucky. Because his father worked in the stables, he was around horses from an early age and began working with horses at the age of nine. At the age of eleven he began racing as a jockey. He received the nickname "Soup" for his well-known love of soup, which helped keep his weight down.

In 1892 Perkins signed a five-year contract with horse trainer, Peter Wimmer. By 1893 he was winning races consistently, drawing the attention of horse owners whose horses raced in the Derby. In 1894 he competed successfully with Alonzo Clayton, another African-American jockey who held the distinction of being the youngest jockey ever to win the Kentucky Derby (in 1892) and won the lion's share of races that he entered.

== Kentucky Derby ==
In 1895 Perkins' mount was Halma, the horse that was favored to win. He rode Halma to victory, leading the race from wire to wire. That same year he had 762 mounts and won 192 races, the most wins of any jockey in America. Despite his unmatched record, the media began to criticize his riding.

Perkins had become so famous that he was written about in newspapers in San Francisco, New York, and all across Canada. In his heyday, he was earning about $10,000 per year, the equivalent of $346,000 in 2022 US dollars.

== His career devolves ==
After his Derby win, Perkins struggled with his weight and had trouble getting mounts. An Anti-African American union of Euro-American jockeys, formed in 1892, had begun running off all the African-American jockeys, especially the successful ones like Perkins. In 1897 he was disqualified from taking any mounts. He also got in trouble with the law repeatedly. Consequently, his career as a jockey plummeted, and, in 1905, he turned to training and timing horses. He was in Hamilton, Ontario, Canada when he suffered a massive heart attack and died on August 10, 1911. His wife had his remains brought back to Lexington, where he was buried in African Cemetery #2. A historical marker was placed at his grave by a University of Kentucky Commonwealth Collaboratives Grant 'Young Equestrian Scholars Initiative'.
