= Fluvanna =

Fluvanna may refer to:

- Fluvanna County, Virginia
- Fluvanna, Texas
- Fluvanna (horse), American Champion racehorse
- Fluvanna Correctional Center for Women
