= Cudgel (horse) =

American-bred Thoroughbred racehorse

- Sire: Broomstick
- Grandsire: Ben Brush
- Dam: Eugenia Burch
- Damsire: Ben Strome
- Sex: Stallion
- Foaled: 1914
- Country: United States
- Colour: Bay
- Breeder: Harry Payne Whitney
- Owner: John W. Schorr; J. K. L. Ross (1918-9)
- Trainer: H. Guy Bedwell
- Record: Not found
- Earnings: Not found

Major wins
- Dixie Handicap (1918); Kentucky Handicap (1918); Brooklyn Handicap (1918); Liberty Handicap (1918); Cecil Handicap (1919); Merchants and Citizens Handicap (1919); Havre de Grace Handicap (1919); Hudson Handicap (1919)

Awards
- American Champion Older Male Horse (1918); American Co-Champion Older Male Horse (1919)

Cudgel (1914–1941) was an American two-time Champion Thoroughbred racehorse.

Trained by future U.S. Racing Hall of Fame inductee H. Guy Bedwell, Cudgel is probably best remembered for his win in the 1919 Havre de Grace Handicap in which he defeated two future Hall of Fame inductees, Exterminator and Sir Barton.

Cudgel's racing record is incomplete, especially at ages two and three when he raced primarily in "the west" (a term then used for racetracks in Kentucky and other states away from the East Coast). At age two in 1916, he won the Hamburg Place and Mt. Lookout Handicaps and was third in the Glenview Handicap. At age three, he won the Latonia Independence and Madisonville Handicaps, and was second in the Latonia Derby. He finished eleventh in the 1917 Kentucky Derby. In August, he was purchased for $30,000 by Canadian businessman and Canadian thoroughbred racehorse owner and breeder J. K. L. Ross.

At age four in 1918, Cudgel was relocated to the east coast where he developed into the champion older horse of the year, winning five major stakes races. In the Pimlico Spring Handicap on May 8, he beat Omar Khayyam, the previous year's three-year-old champion. On May 19, he beat Spur in the Kings County Handicap. He briefly returned to Kentucky where he won the Kentucky Handicap on June 1. Travelling back to New York, he beat future Hall of Famer Roamer in the Brooklyn Handicap on June 24 while carrying top weight of 129 pounds. On August 16, he set an American record of 1:56 for 1 3/16 miles while winning the Schenectady Handicap at Saratoga by a nose over Westy Hogan. He carried 131 pounds in the race, 5 pounds more than Westy Hogan. After this, he lost several races but returned to form in the Liberty Handicap on September 27, winning handily despite conceding 48 pounds to the runner-up. After another loss, he finished the season by winning the Dixie Handicap at Laurel racetrack "with ridiculous ease" over Midway and Omar Khayyam.

The next year, despite a long layoff between May and August as a result of an injury, he came back to share Champion Older Horse honors with Sun Briar.

== At Stud ==
After retiring from racing, Cudgel stood at stud Ross's Yarrow Brae Stud near Laurel, Maryland. A successful sire, his best offspring were Fluvanna, 1923 American Champion Two-Year-Old Filly, and Froth Blower, who won the 1931 King's Plate, Canada's most prestigious race.

Cudgel died in October 1941 at age twenty-seven.

== Sire line tree ==
- Cudgel
  - Milkman
    - Pasteurized
      - Bordeaux
      - Marchized
      - Woodchuck
        - Winning Shot
  - Froth Blower

== Pedigree ==
Pedigree of Cudgel, bay colt, 1914
Sire Broomstick	Ben Brush	Bramble	Bonnie Scotland
Sire Broomstick	Ben Brush	Bramble	Ivy Leaf
Sire Broomstick	Ben Brush	Roseville	Reform
Sire Broomstick	Ben Brush	Roseville	Albia
Sire Broomstick	Elf	Galliard	Galopin
Sire Broomstick	Elf	Galliard	Mavis
Sire Broomstick	Elf	Sylvabelle	Bend Or*
Sire Broomstick	Elf	Sylvabelle	Saint Editha
Dam Eugenia Burch	Ben Strome	Bend Or*	Doncaster*
Dam Eugenia Burch	Ben Strome	Bend Or*	Rouge Red*
Dam Eugenia Burch	Ben Strome	Strathfleet	Scottish Chief
Dam Eugenia Burch	Ben Strome	Strathfleet	Masquerade
Dam Eugenia Burch	The Humber	Bread Knife	Craig Millar
Dam Eugenia Burch	The Humber	Bread Knife	Slice
Dam Eugenia Burch	The Humber	Keepsake	Memory
Dam Eugenia Burch	The Humber	Keepsake	Lady Margaret (family: 4-a)

* Cudgel is inbred 4S x 3D to the stallion Bend Or, meaning that he appears fourth generation on the sire side of his pedigree, and third generation on the dam side of his pedigree.
