= Bashford Manor, Louisville =

Neighborhood in Louisville, Kentucky

Coordinates: 38°12′11″N 85°40′26″W

Bashford Manor is a neighborhood in Louisville, Kentucky, United States. Its boundaries are I-264 to the north, Bardstown Road to the east, Bashford Manor Lane to the south, and Newburg Road to the west. Originally a part of Thomas Byrd's 1,000 acre (4 km^{2}) land grant from Virginia in 1787, James Bennett Wilder bought the land in 1870 and built a home which he named Bashford Manor, after his family's home in England. He sold the property to George James Long in 1888, who turned it into a horse farm which produced three early Kentucky Derby winners: Azra, Manuel and Sir Huon.

The home stayed in his family until it was sold in 1951. It was annexed by Louisville in 1953. Many residential developments began at this time, the first being Harold Miller's Bashford Manor gardens in 1952. Other subdivisions included Manorview and the largest single subdivision, Village Green. Apartment complexes were built during the 1960s, and commercial developments such as Watterson City in 1965. By the 1970s Watterson City was Louisville's largest suburban commercial center, and Bashford Manor Mall was built in the area.

The area went into a decline by the 1990s, with the mall and other businesses (such as a once thriving multiplex cinema) closing, although the situation improved in the 2000s when a Walmart and a Lowe's were built on the site of the old mall.
