= 1917 Kentucky Derby =

Horse race

43rd Kentucky Derby
- Kentucky Derby
- Grade I stakes race
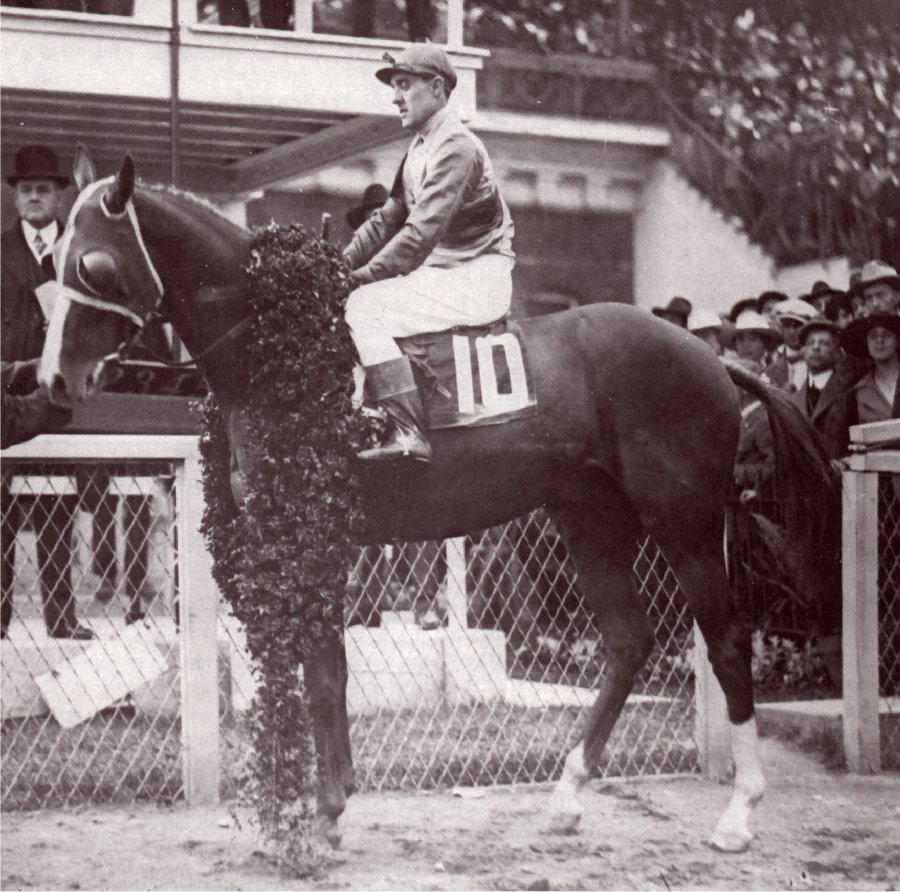
- 1917 Kentucky Derby winner Omar Khayyam
- Location: Churchill Downs
- Date: May 12, 1917
- Winning horse: Omar Khayyam
- Jockey: Charles Borel
- Trainer: Charles T. Patterson
- Owner: Billings & Johnson
- Surface: Dirt

The 1917 Kentucky Derby was the 43rd running of the Kentucky Derby. The race took place on May 12, 1917. Winner Omar Khayyam, foaled in England, was the first foreign bred horse to win the Derby.

== Full results ==
Finished	Post	Horse	Jockey	Trainer	Owner	Time / behind
1st	8	Omar Khayyam	Charles Borel	Charles T. Patterson	C. K. G. Billings & Frederick Johnson	2:04.60
2nd	3	Ticket	John McTaggart	A. J. Goldsborough	Andrew Miller	2
3rd	1	Midway	Claude Hunt	William J. Young	James W. Parrish	1 1/2
4th	11	Rickety	Frank Robinson	James G. Rowe Sr.	Harry Payne Whitney	4
5th	9	War Star	Merrit C. Buxton	Walter B. Jennings	A. Kingsley Macomber	1
6th	14	Manister Toi	Frank Keogh	John J. Flanigan	Emil Herz	Head
7th	4	Skeptic	Eddie Martin	John I. Smith	Herbert H. Hewitt	Head
8th	2	Guy Fortune	Danny Connelly	Dan Lehan	Pastime Stable	1 1/2
9th	12	Star Master	Johnny Loftus	Walter B. Jennings	A. Kingsley Macomber	1/2
10th	13	Stargazer	Willie Crump	Walter B. Jennings	A. Kingsley Macomber	Head
11th	5	Cudgel	Frank Murphy	James T. Mooney	John W. Schorr	2
12th	7	Green Jones	Roscoe Goose	William Huntley Baker	William Huntley Baker	5
13th	10	Top o' the Wave	John Morys	George Zeigler	Beverwyck Stable	8
14th	6	Berline	Walter Andress	John S. Ward	John S. Ward	4
15th	15	Acabado	Andy Schuttinger	William C. Clancy	Wickliffe Stable	12

- Winning Breeder: Sir John Robinson (England)
- Horses Penrod, Diamond, and Sol Gilsey scratched before the race

== Payout ==
Post	Horse	Win	Place	Show
8	Omar Khayyam	$ 27.60	10.90	6.20
3	Ticket		3.70	2.80
1	Midway			5.10

- The winner received a purse of $16,600.
- Second place received $2,500.
- Third place received $1,000.
- Fourth place received $275.
