= Chant (horse) =

American-bred Thoroughbred racehorse

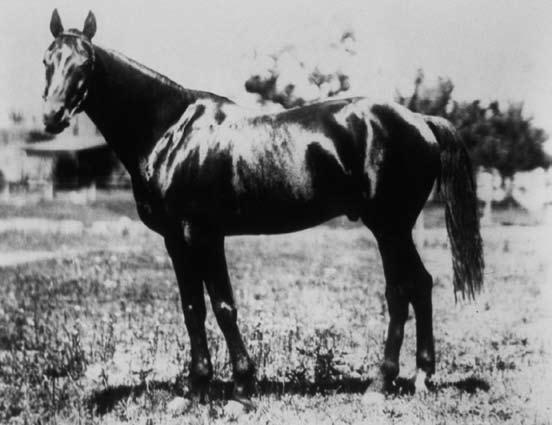
- 1894 Kentucky Derby winner Chant
- Sire: Falsetto
- Grandsire: Enquirer
- Dam: Addie C
- Damsire: King Alfonso
- Sex: Stallion
- Foaled: 1891
- Country: United States
- Colour: Bay
- Breeder: A. J. Alexander
- Owner: 1) H. Eugene Leigh & Robert L. Rose; 2) Charles Head Smith
- Trainer: H. Eugene Leigh
- Record: 63: 22-15-6
- Earnings: $18,280

Major wins
- Clark Handicap (1894); Phoenix Stakes (1894) American Classics wins: Kentucky Derby (1894)

Chant (foaled 1891 in Kentucky) was an American Thoroughbred racehorse that won the 1894 Kentucky Derby, Phoenix Stakes, and Clark Handicap. He was related through his damsire, King Alfonso, to Kentucky Derby winners Fonso (1880) and Joe Cotton (1885) and through his sire, Falsetto, to His Eminence (1901) and Sir Huon (1906).

Chant was sold in September 1894 to Charles Head Smith for $5,100 at auction when Leigh & Rose dissolved their partnership. Chant injured his leg in February 1895 but was entered in several races at a track in Saratoga Springs, New York in July 1895, finishing second in one of them to a horse named Sir Excess and winning $375 in a small stakes race in August 1895.

A 1910 Daily Racing Form article reports that Chant was sold to a western Thoroughbred breeder and produced a few stakes winners in California. He was still reported as being alive in 1910.

== Pedigree ==
Pedigree of Chant
Sire Falsetto 1876	Enquirer 1867	Leamington	Faugh-a-Ballagh
Sire Falsetto 1876	Enquirer 1867	Leamington	Pantaloon Mare
Sire Falsetto 1876	Enquirer 1867	Lida	Lexington
Sire Falsetto 1876	Enquirer 1867	Lida	Lize
Sire Falsetto 1876	Farfaletta 1867	Australian	West Australian
Sire Falsetto 1876	Farfaletta 1867	Australian	Emilia
Sire Falsetto 1876	Farfaletta 1867	Elkhorna	Lexington
Sire Falsetto 1876	Farfaletta 1867	Elkhorna	Glencona
Dam Addie C 1883	King Alfonso 1872	Phaeton	King Tom
Dam Addie C 1883	King Alfonso 1872	Phaeton	Merry Sunshine
Dam Addie C 1883	King Alfonso 1872	Capitola	Vandal
Dam Addie C 1883	King Alfonso 1872	Capitola	Margrave Mare
Dam Addie C 1883	Aerolite 1862	Lexington	Boston
Dam Addie C 1883	Aerolite 1862	Lexington	Alice Carneal
Dam Addie C 1883	Aerolite 1862	Florine	Glencoe I
Dam Addie C 1883	Aerolite 1862	Florine	Melody
