= Disappearance of Ann Gotlib =

American missing person

Ann Gotlib
- Born: May 5, 1971; Kyiv, Ukrainian SSR, Soviet Union
- Disappeared: June 1, 1983 (aged 12); Louisville, Kentucky, United States
- Status: Missing for 43 years, 2 months and 18 days
- Known for: Missing person
- Height: 5 ft 1 in (1.55 m)
- Parent(s): Anatoly and Lyudmila Gotlib

Ann Gotlib (born May 5, 1971 – disappeared June 1, 1983) was a Soviet Jewish immigrant to the United States who disappeared at the age of 12 from the premises of a Louisville, Kentucky mall. The case to find her abductor was covered heavily by the Louisville news media and stretched for the next twenty-five years until a person of interest was eventually identified.

== Background ==
Gotlib, a Soviet Jewish immigrant, moved to the United States in 1980 with her family. She was fluent in both English and Russian.

== Disappearance ==
Ann was last seen on June 1, 1983, between 5:30 and 6:00 PM. She was visiting Bashford Manor Mall, across the street from the apartment complex where she lived with her family. Her bike was later found outside the Bacon's Department Store at the mall.

== Investigation ==
External image
- Age progression of Gotlib to age 42

The FBI headed the investigation. Police followed up on thousands of leads and questioned between 30 and 40 suspects over the years. Three days after her disappearance, a police dog traced her scent to the apartment of Ester Okmyansky, the grandmother of the last person to see Gotlib alive. Okmyansky said Gotlib had never visited the apartment, and after a thorough investigation of her family, police concluded the dog had made an error.

Others investigated included a sex offender who had been at the mall within an hour of Gotlib's disappearance and a serial sex offender who had supplied an alibi.

An often repeated conspiracy theory held that Gotlib had been abducted by the Soviet government to force her parents to return to the Soviet Union. Both the FBI and the Gotlib family had dismissed this theory. Another theory was that she had left voluntarily after having trouble adapting to life in the United States. Investigators and her family dismissed this as well, saying she gave no indications of anxiety prior to the disappearance, and if she had run away voluntarily she likely would have taken some money or possessions, and made contact eventually.

In 1990, Texas Death Row inmate Michael Lee Lockhart claimed to have killed Gotlib and buried her body at Fort Knox and eventually provided a map of the burial site, but after a thorough investigation police found no physical evidence to verify his claim.

Up through 2008, the Louisville Metro Police Department still listed the disappearance as an open case. Nevertheless, it was considered a cold case due to the amount of time that had passed. The investigation documents fill four filing cabinets.

=== 2008 developments ===
On December 4, 2008, Louisville Metro Police announced a major break in the disappearance case of Ann Gotlib. A spokesperson for the LMPD, commenting on new developments in the case, suggested that it was the police's belief that convicted felon and former veterinarian Gregory Oakley Jr. — who had been a suspect since the initial disappearance in 1983 — had possibly been responsible for the young girl's disappearance. Oakley died in Alabama in 2002 after being released from the Kentucky State Reformatory in La Grange on a medical pardon, where he was serving time for burglary and rape. That case was similar to the Gotlib case by the fact the victim was a 13-year-old girl having red hair. Police believe that Oakley followed Gotlib to the Bashford Manor Mall parking lot, where he abducted her, leaving nothing but her bike.

According to a man who had once served time in a Kentucky prison in the late 1980s and early 1990s with Oakley, Oakley confessed to abducting Gotlib and killing her with an overdose of Talwin, a pain killer. Police had considered Oakley a suspect in the Gotlib case since January 1984, when Oakley was arrested and eventually convicted of raping a 13-year-old Louisville girl. Oakley failed a polygraph test concerning Gotlib, but police never had enough evidence to tie him to her disappearance.

== Impact ==
Due to the startling way in which Gotlib had vanished in broad daylight without any trace, it was a key case that led the United States Congress to create the National Center for Missing and Exploited Children in 1984 to coordinate departments involved in missing-persons cases. The center credits the Gotlib case with increasing national awareness of missing and abducted children and revolutionizing how missing-child cases are handled. One new technique that came out of the investigation was the use of billboards and other tactics to generate widespread awareness of a missing person, which was considered futile according to conventional wisdom at the time.

== See also ==
- List of kidnappings
- List of people who disappeared mysteriously: post-1970
