= Falsetto (horse) =

American-bred Thoroughbred racehorse

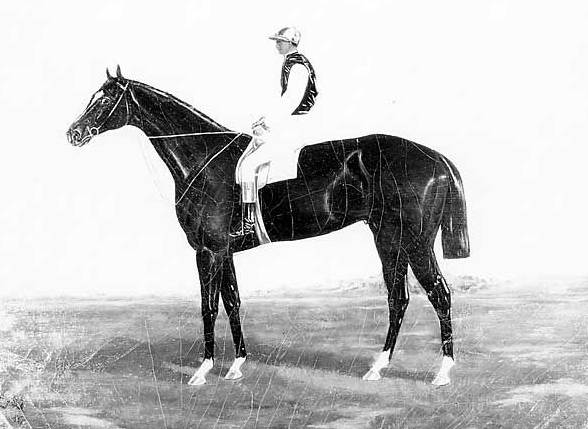
- Falsetto 1876-1904- Enquirer x Farfaletta
- Sire: Enquirer
- Grandsire: Leamington
- Dam: Farfaletta
- Damsire: Australian
- Sex: Stallion
- Foaled: 1876
- Country: United States
- Colour: Bay
- Breeder: J. W. Hunt Reynolds
- Owner: J. W. Hunt Reynolds
- Trainer: Eli Jordan

Major wins
- Clark Handicap (1879); Kenner Stakes (1879); Phoenix Stakes (1879); Travers Stakes (1879)

Awards
- American Champion 3-Year-Old Colt (1879)

Falsetto (1876–1904) was an American Thoroughbred Champion racehorse and outstanding sire. Bred and raced by J. W. Hunt Reynolds of Lexington, Kentucky, his dam was Farfaletta and his sire was General Abe Buford's very good runner, Enquirer.

Conditioned for racing by African American trainer, Eli Jordan, as a three-year-old in 1879 Falsetto won four of his five starts and was the dominant horse of his age group in the United States. Under African American star jockey, Isaac Murphy, he ran second to Lord Murphy in the Kentucky Derby but won the Phoenix Hotel Stakes and the Clark Handicap, plus he defeated the great Spendthrift in winning the Kenner and Travers Stakes.

Owner J. W. Hunt Reynolds died in September 1880 and the horse was sent to Pierre Lorillard IV who raced him in England along with several other American horses including Horse and Iroquois.

Returned to the United States and retired to stud duty, Falsetto stood at A. J. Alexander's Woodburn Stud in Woodford County, Kentucky. Falsetto became one of only four stallions to sire three Kentucky Derby winners and another of his sons, Sir Cleges, ran second in the 1908 Derby. Among his progeny, Falsetto was the sire of:

- Dew Drop/Dewdrop (b. 1883) - American Champion Three-Year-Old Filly, won Champagne Stakes, Monmouth Oaks
- Chant (b. 1891) - won 1894 Kentucky Derby
- His Eminence - won 1901 Kentucky Derby, Clark Handicap
- Sir Huon - won Kentucky Derby, Latonia Derby

Falsetto died of pneumonia in August 1904 at age twenty-eight.

== Pedigree ==
Pedigree of Falsetto
Sire Enquirer	Leamington	Faugh-a-Ballagh	Sir Hercules
Sire Enquirer	Leamington	Faugh-a-Ballagh	Guiccioli
Sire Enquirer	Leamington	Pantaloon Mare	Pantaloon
Sire Enquirer	Leamington	Pantaloon Mare	Daphne
Sire Enquirer	Lida	Lexington*	Boston*
Sire Enquirer	Lida	Lexington*	Alice Carneal*
Sire Enquirer	Lida	Lize	American Eclipse
Sire Enquirer	Lida	Lize	Gabriella
Dam Farfaletta	Australian	West Australian	Melbourne
Dam Farfaletta	Australian	West Australian	Mowerina
Dam Farfaletta	Australian	Emilia	Young Emilius
Dam Farfaletta	Australian	Emilia	Persian
Dam Farfaletta	Elkhorna	Lexington*	Boston*
Dam Farfaletta	Elkhorna	Lexington*	Alice Carneal*
Dam Farfaletta	Elkhorna	Glencona	Glencoe
Dam Farfaletta	Elkhorna	Glencona	Envoy Mare

* Falsetto is inbred 3S x 3D to the stallion Lexington, meaning that he appears third generation on the sire side of his pedigree, and third generation on the dam side of his pedigree.
