= Ben Strome =

British racehorse

- Sire: Bend Or
- Grandsire: Doncaster
- Dam: Strathfleet
- Damsire: The Scottish Chief
- Sex: Stallion
- Foaled: 1886
- Country: Great Britain
- Color: Bay
- Owner: Duke of Westminster
- Trainer: John Porter
- Record: not found
- Earnings: not found

Awards
- Leading sire in North America (1903)

Ben Strome (1886 - October 1909) was a British Thoroughbred racehorse. Although highly regarded in his early days, he was considered a disappointment on the racetrack. He was exported to the United States where he became the leading sire in 1903. His most famous offspring was Hall of Famer Roseben.

Ben Strome was a bay horse with a "splendid back and quarters, standing apparently on legs of iron." He was sired by Bend Or and out of Strathfleet by The Scottish Chief. Ben Strome was trained by John Porter, one of the most celebrated horsemen of the Victorian era.

Expectations for Ben Strome were high but he did not make his debut until late in the 1888 racing season as Porter did not believe in racing horses early. In his only start at age two, he was unplaced in the Middle Park Plate behind Donovan. At three, his best result was a second-place finish in the St James's Palace Stakes to Pioneer. Now considered one of the great disappointments of Porter's career, Ben Strome was entered in a selling race at Newmarket where he was bought for 100 guineas. He was subsequently exported to the United States.

== Stud career ==
Ben Strome was the leading sire in North America of 1903, when his top money earner was two-year-old champion Highball. He finished third in 1904 with progeny earnings of $106,305. His best offspring was the gelding Roseben, who was a three-time champion sprinter and set world records at six and seven furlongs. Ben Strome was also the broodmare sire of champion Cudgel.

Ben Strome died on October 14, 1909, at the age of 23.

== Pedigree ==
Pedigree of Ben Strome, 1886
Sire Bend Or	Doncaster	Stockwell	The Baron (IRE)
Sire Bend Or	Doncaster	Stockwell	Pocahontas
Sire Bend Or	Doncaster	Marigold	Teddington
Sire Bend Or	Doncaster	Marigold	Ratan Mare
Sire Bend Or	Rouge Rose	Thormanby	Windhound
Sire Bend Or	Rouge Rose	Thormanby	Alice Hawthorn
Sire Bend Or	Rouge Rose	Ellen Horne	Redshank
Sire Bend Or	Rouge Rose	Ellen Horne	Delhi
Dam Strathfleet	The Scottish Chief	Lord of the Isles	Touchstone
Dam Strathfleet	The Scottish Chief	Lord of the Isles	Fair Helen
Dam Strathfleet	The Scottish Chief	Miss Ann	The Little Known
Dam Strathfleet	The Scottish Chief	Miss Ann	Bay Missy
Dam Strathfleet	Masquerade	Lambourn	Loup Garou
Dam Strathfleet	Masquerade	Lambourn	Pantaloon Mare
Dam Strathfleet	Masquerade	Burlesque	Touchstone
Dam Strathfleet	Masquerade	Burlesque	Maid of Honor (family 14)

Ben Strome is inbred 4 x 4 to Touchstone on the dam's side of his pedigree.
