= Halma (horse) =

American-bred Thoroughbred racehorse

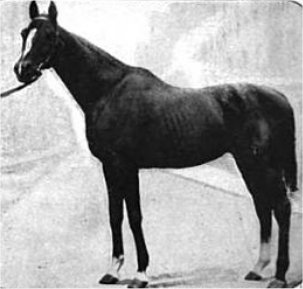
- Halma, circa 1907, by Charles C. Cook
- Sire: Hanover
- Grandsire: Hindoo
- Dam: Julia L.
- Damsire: Longfellow
- Sex: Stallion
- Foaled: 1892
- Country: United States
- Colour: Black
- Breeder: Eastin & Larabie
- Owner: 1) Byron McClelland; 2) Charles Fleischmann & Sons; 3) William K. Vanderbilt (at stud)
- Trainer: 1) Byron McClelland; 2) Thomas Welsh
- Record: 16: 7-2-3
- Earnings: US$15,885

Major wins
- Phoenix Hotel Stakes (1895); Clark Handicap (1895); Latonia Derby (1895); American Classics wins: Kentucky Derby (1895)

Halma (1892–1909) was an American Thoroughbred racehorse who won the 1895 Kentucky Derby. He is best known for being the first Kentucky Derby winner to sire a Kentucky Derby winner.

== Background ==
Halma was bred in Kentucky by Eastin & Larabie, a racing and breeding partnership created in 1886 between Montana banker and financier Samuel E. Larabie and Augustus Eastin, a wealthy Kentucky businessman. He was sired by Hanover, a three-time Leading sire in North America and a U.S. Racing Hall of Fame inductee. Grandsire Hindoo, was a Champion runner who also was inducted in the U.S. Racing Hall of Fame. Halma was out of the mare Julia L., a daughter of Champion and Hall of Famer, Longfellow. He was purchased as a yearling by Byron McClelland, who trained his own racing stable.

== Racing career ==
Halma got his first win under African American jockey Alonzo Clayton on August 26, 1894, at New York's Sheepshead Bay Race Track. At age three, with 15-year-old African American James "Soup" Perkins up, Halma won the Phoenix Hotel Stakes, then on May 3, 1895, only three days later, again ridden by Perkins, he won the last Kentucky Derby to be held at the race's original 1½ mile distance. On May 14, under Perkins (who would be America's leading rider that year with 192 wins), he won the Clark Handicap shortly after which McClelland sold him to wealthy businessman Charles Fleischmann for a reported $30,000. Two days after Fleischmann purchased Halma, the colt won the May 21, 1895 Latonia Derby. An injury kept him out of racing in the summer and fall of 1895, and in 1896 he went lame and was retired to stud.

== Stud career ==
Halma stood at stud in the United States where he notably sired Alan-a-Dale (b. 1899), winner of the 1902 Kentucky Derby. Halma was the first Derby winner to sire a Derby winner. In June 1901 Charles Fleischmann sold him to American sportsman, William Kissam Vanderbilt who shipped him to his Haras du Quesnay stud farm in France.

In France, Halma's best runner was Oversight (b. 1906), a top colt at age competing at two to four whose wins included the Prix de la Salamandre, Prix du President de la Republique, and Prix Lupin.

Halma died in 1909 at age seventeen.

== Sire line tree ==
- Halma
  - Alan-a-Dale
    - Barnsdale
  - Smart Set
  - Acacia
  - Oversight
    - Mirebeau
    - Insight

== Pedigree ==
Pedigree of Halma
Sire Hanover 1884	Hindoo; 1878	Virgil	Vandal*
Sire Hanover 1884	Hindoo; 1878	Virgil	Hymenia
Sire Hanover 1884	Hindoo; 1878	Florence	Lexington*
Sire Hanover 1884	Hindoo; 1878	Florence	Weatherwitch
Sire Hanover 1884	Bourbon Belle; 1869	Bonnie Scotland	Iago
Sire Hanover 1884	Bourbon Belle; 1869	Bonnie Scotland	Queen Mary
Sire Hanover 1884	Bourbon Belle; 1869	Ella D.	Vandal*
Sire Hanover 1884	Bourbon Belle; 1869	Ella D.	Falcon
Dam Julia L. 1885	Longfellow; 1867	Leamington	Faugh-a-Ballagh
Dam Julia L. 1885	Longfellow; 1867	Leamington	Pantaloon Mare
Dam Julia L. 1885	Longfellow; 1867	Nantura	Counterplot
Dam Julia L. 1885	Longfellow; 1867	Nantura	Quiz
Dam Julia L. 1885	Christine; 1871	Australian	West Australian
Dam Julia L. 1885	Christine; 1871	Australian	Emilia
Dam Julia L. 1885	Christine; 1871	La Grande Duchesse	Lexington*
Dam Julia L. 1885	Christine; 1871	La Grande Duchesse	Ann Innis

* Halma is inbred 4S x 4S to the stallion Vandal, meaning that he appears fourth generation twice on the sire side of his pedigree.

* Halma is inbred 4S x 4D to the stallion Lexington, meaning that he appears fourth generation on the sire side of his pedigree and fourth generation on the dam side of his pedigree.
