= Fall Handicap =

Former American horse race

- Class: Discontinued stakes
- Location: Sheepshead Bay Race Track, Sheepshead Bay, Brooklyn, New York
- Inaugurated: 1894–1909
- Race type: Thoroughbred – Flat racing
- Website: www.pegasusworldcup.com

Race information
- Distance: 6 1/2 furlongs (4,300 ft; 1,300 m)
- Surface: Dirt
- Track: left-handed
- Qualification: Three Years Old & older

The Fall Handicap was an American Thoroughbred horse race held annually at Sheepshead Bay Race Track in Sheepshead Bay, Brooklyn, New York from 1894 thru 1909 for horses of either sex age three and older. For easier identification purposes, the race is sometimes referred to as the Coney Island Fall Handicap. For its first two editions, the Fall Handicap was run on the track's short futurity course at 5 3/4 furlongs (3,800 ft; 1,200 m) then for the next twelve runnings at 6 furlongs (4,000 ft; 1,200 m) and the final two years at 6 1/2 furlongs (4,300 ft; 1,300 m). The Fall Handicap was the first of the track's autumn serials, preceding the Ocean Handicap at 6 1/2 furlongs (4,300 ft; 1,300 m) and the Omnium Handicap at 9 furlongs (5,900 ft; 1,800 m).

== Historical notes ==
Among the winners of the Fall Handicap, the three-year-old colt Ornament won in 1897 and would earn American Horse of the Year and American Champion Three-Year-Old Male Horse honors. The great gelding Roseben won the 1906 running in a year he would dominate American sprint racing. Roseben's successful career would see him inducted into the U.S. Racing Hall of Fame.

In 1895, the American Champion Two-Year-Old Filly of 1894 named The Butterflies defeated future Hall of Fame inductee Domino. In 1904 another filly named Hamburg Belle defeated the 1902 Kentucky Derby winner, Alan-a-Dale who had also run second to the filly Dainty in the second part of the fall serials, the Ocean Handicap.

== Demise of the Fall Handicap ==
After years of uncertainty, on June 11, 1908, the Republican controlled New York Legislature under Governor Charles Evans Hughes passed the Hart–Agnew anti-betting legislation with penalties allowing for fines and up to a year in prison. The owners of Sheepshead Bay Race Track, and other racing facilities in New York State, struggled to stay in business without income from betting. Racetrack operators had no choice but to drastically reduce the purse money being paid out which resulted in the Fall Handicap offering a purse in 1909 that was nearly one-third of what it had been in earlier years. These small purses made racing horses highly unprofitable and impossible for even the most successful owners to continue in business. As such, for the 1910 racing season management of the Sheepshead Bay facility dropped some of its less important stakes races and used the purse money to bolster its most important events. The effect was to place the Fall Handicap on hiatus. Further restrictive legislation was passed by the New York Legislature in 1910 which deepened the financial crisis for track operators and after a 1911 amendment to the law to limit the liability of owners and directors was defeated, every racetrack in New York State shut down. Owners, whose horses of racing age had nowhere to go, began sending them, their trainers and their jockeys to race in England and France. Many horses ended their racing careers there, and a number remained to become an important part of the European horse breeding industry. Thoroughbred Times reported that more than 1,500 American horses were sent overseas between 1908 and 1913 and of them at least 24 were either past, present, or future Champions. When a February 21, 1913 ruling by the New York Supreme Court, Appellate Division Court saw horse racing return in 1913 it was too late for the Sheepshead Bay horse racing facility and it never reopened.

== Records ==
Speed record:

- 6 furlongs (4,000 ft; 1,200 m): 1:12.40 – Roseben (1906)

Most wins:

- No horse ever won this race more than once.

Most wins by a jockey:

- 2 – Henry Griffin (1894, 1895)
- 2 – Lucien Lyne (1904, 1906)

Most wins by a trainer:

- 2 – A. Jack Joyner (1894, 1904)
- 2 – John Hyland (1895, 1898)

Most wins by an owner:

- 2 – August Belmont Jr. (1894, 1908)
- 2 – David Gideon & John Daly (1895, 1896)

== Winners ==
Year	Winner	Age	Jockey	Trainer	Owner	Distance	Time	Win US$
1909	Besom	4	Charles Grand	Nathan L. Byer	Philip S. P. Randolph	6.5 furlongs (4,300 ft; 1,300 m)	1:18.60	$1,050
1908	Half Sovereign	3	James Butler Jr.	John Whalen	August Belmont Jr.	6.5 furlongs (4,300 ft; 1,300 m)	1:18.20	$1,125
1907	De Mund	3	Joe Notter	William M. Garth	Paul J. Rainey	6 furlongs (4,000 ft; 1,200 m)	1:13.40	$2,480
1906	Roseben	5	Lucien Lyne	Frank D. Weir	Davy C. Johnson	6 furlongs (4,000 ft; 1,200 m)	1:12.40	$2,920
1905	Prince Hamburg	3	Gene Hildebrand	John W. Rogers	Harry Payne Whitney	6 furlongs (4,000 ft; 1,200 m)	1:14.20	$2,930
1904	Hamburg Belle	3	Lucien Lyne	A. Jack Joyner	Sydney Paget	6 furlongs (4,000 ft; 1,200 m)	1:12.80	$2,780
1903	Shot Gun	3	Willie Gannon	Walter B. Jennings	Walter B. Jennings	6 furlongs (4,000 ft; 1,200 m)	1:14.40	$2,100
1902	King Pepper	4	Arthur Redfern	Crit Davis	Pepper Stable (James E. Pepper)	6 furlongs (4,000 ft; 1,200 m)	1:12.80	$1,450
1901	Coburg	4	Patrick A. McCue	Barry Littlefield	Joseph E. Seagram	6 furlongs (4,000 ft; 1,200 m)	1:13.20	$1,450
1900	Waring	3	John Bullman	Frank M. Taylor	Frank M. Taylor	6 furlongs (4,000 ft; 1,200 m)	1:14.00	$1,450
1899	Previous	4	Winfield O'Connor	Julius J. Bauer	Bromley & Co. (Joseph E. Bromley & Arthur Featherstone)	6 furlongs (4,000 ft; 1,200 m)	1:13.40	$1,150
1898	Miss Miriam	3	Tod Sloan	John Hyland	William C. Whitney Ŧ	6 furlongs (4,000 ft; 1,200 m)	1:15.40	$1,150
1897	Ornament	3	Alonzo Clayton	Charles T. Patterson	Charles T. Patterson	6 furlongs (4,000 ft; 1,200 m)	1:14.40	$1,125
1896	Gotham	4	John J. McCafferty	John J. McCafferty	David Gideon & John Daly	6 furlongs (4,000 ft; 1,200 m)	1:15.00	$1,125
1895	The Butterflies	3	Henry Griffin	John Hyland	David Gideon & John Daly	5.75 furlongs (3,800 ft; 1,160 m)	1:09.80	$1,125
1894	Lady Violet	3	Henry Griffin	A. Jack Joyner	August Belmont Jr.	5.75 furlongs (3,800 ft; 1,160 m)	1:10.80	$1,450

Ŧ Raced under the name of Sydney Paget for owner William C. Whitney.
