= Charles T. Patterson =

American racehorse trainer

Personal information
- Born: February 4, 1869 Pittsburgh, Pennsylvania
- Died: March 27, 1918 (aged 49) Queens, New York, USA
- Occupation: Racehorse Trainer / owner

Horse racing career
- Sport: Horse racing

Major racing wins
- Double Event Stakes (part 1) (1896); Double Event Stakes (part 2) (1896); Flatbush Stakes (1896); Clark Handicap (1897); Fall Handicap (1897); Latonia Derby (1897); St. Louis Derby (1897); Himyar Stakes (1897); International Derby (1897); Oakley Derby (1897); Twin City Handicap (1897); Brighton Handicap (1898); Brooklyn Handicap (1898); Laureate Stakes (1899); Connaught Cup Stakes (1912); Windsor Hotel Cup Handicap (1912); Tarrytown Stakes (1915); Lawrence Realization Stakes (1917); American Classic Race wins: Kentucky Derby (1897)

Significant horses
- Hamburg, Omar Khayyam, Ornament

Charles Tillinghast Patterson (February 4, 1869 - March 27, 1918) was an owner and trainer of Thoroughbred racehorses best known for his win in the 1917 Kentucky Derby with Omar Khayyam and as the owner and trainer of Ornament, the 1897 American Horse of the Year and American Champion Three-Year-Old Male Horse.

Patterson's father was an owner of Standardbred horses and as young man, Charles was a harness racing driver. In 1891 his interests shifted to Thoroughbred racing and he was hired to train the horses of renowned Kentucky owner and breeder John Madden.

Charles Patterson died on March 27, 1918. He was training for Robert L. Gerry from a base at Belmont Park at the time of his death.
