= Charles B. Borel =

American horse racing jockey

Charles Bernard Borel
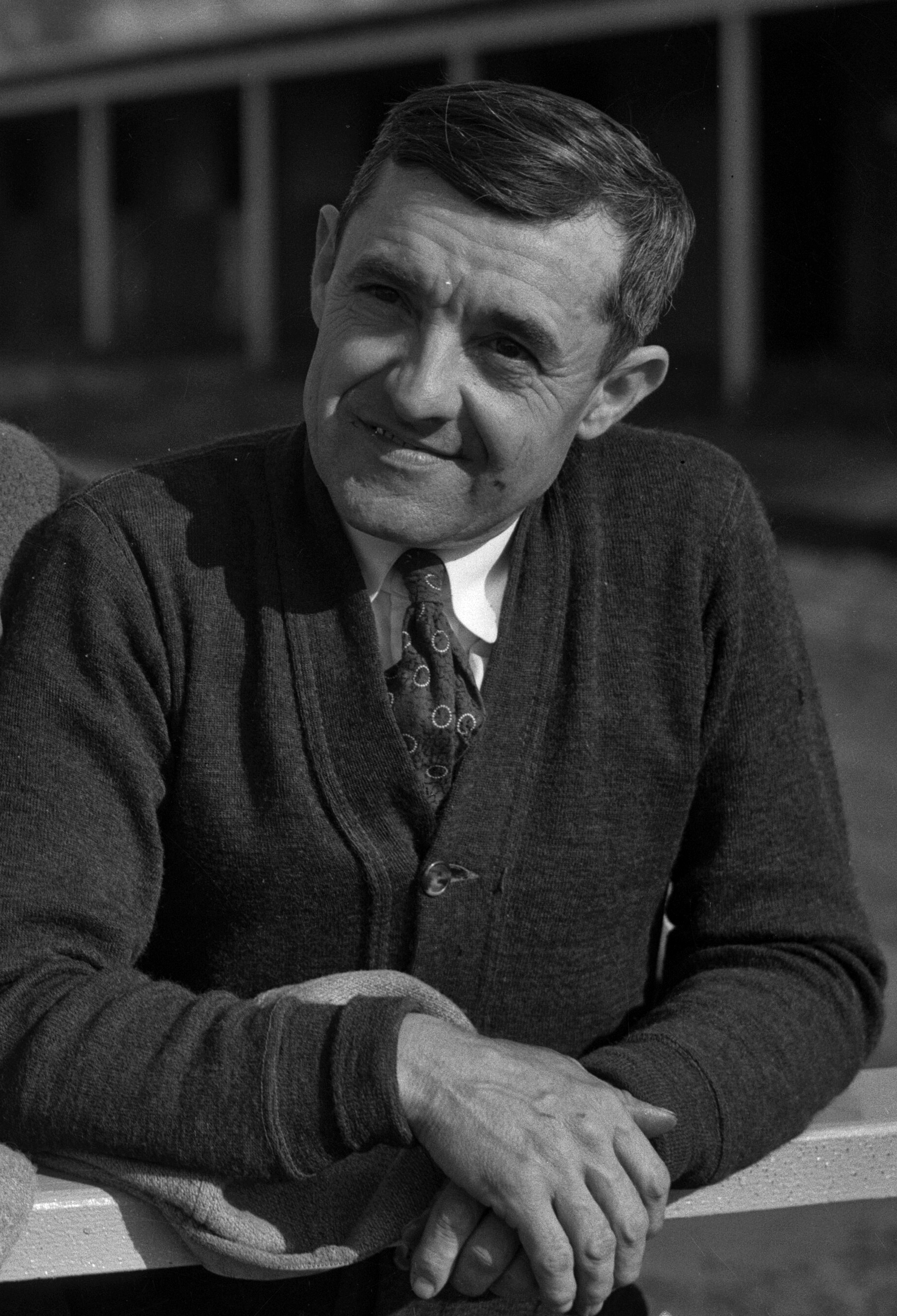
- Borel in 1934
- Occupation: Jockey
- Born: October 14, 1883; Le Locle, Switzerland
- Died: March 15, 1960 (aged 76); Los Angeles, California

Major racing wins
- Delaware Handicap (1913); Futurity Stakes (1913); Clark Handicap (1915); Hudson Stakes (1915); Toboggan Handicap (1915) American Classic Race wins: Kentucky Derby (1917)

Significant horses
- Omar Khayyam, Pebbles

Charles Bernard Borel (October 14, 1883 – March 15, 1960) was an American Thoroughbred horse racing jockey best known for winning the 1917 Kentucky Derby.

== Biography ==
He was born in Le Locle, Switzerland, on October 14, 1883.

Borel rode for prominent stable owners such as Harry Payne Whitney and James Butler. For Whitney he notably won the 1913 Futurity Stakes with Pennant, and for Butler, finished second in the 1915 Kentucky Derby aboard Pebbles. He then won the 1917 Derby with Omar Khayyam, the first foreign-bred horse to win the prestigious race.

By the mid-1930s, a retired Charles Borel made his home in Los Angeles, California, where he was an exercise rider at Santa Anita Park.

He died on March 15, 1960, in Los Angeles.
