= Oversight (horse) =

French-bred Thoroughbred racehorse

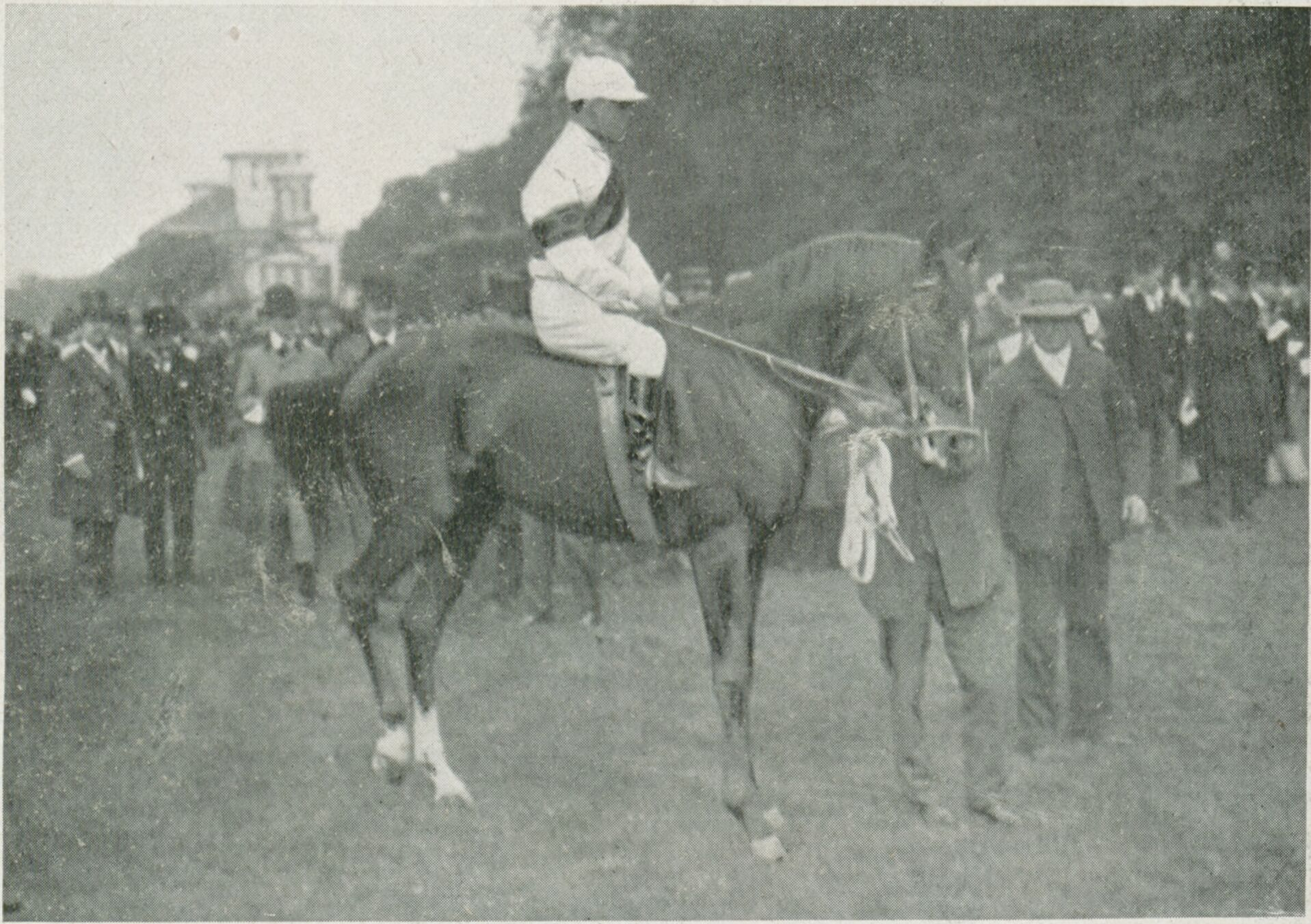
- Prix du Jockey Club (13 June 1909, Chantilly)
- Sire: Halma
- Grandsire: Hanover
- Dam: First Sight
- Damsire: Isinglass
- Sex: Stallion
- Foaled: 1906
- Country: France
- Colour: Bay
- Breeder: Haras du Quesnay
- Owner: William Kissam Vanderbilt
- Trainer: William B. Duke
- Record: 26: 16-5-2
- Earnings: US$117,895 (equivalent)

Major wins
- Prix de la Salamandre (1908); Prix Daru (1909); Prix Lupin (1909); Prix du President de la Republique (1910); Prix Jean Prat (1910); Prix de la Jonchere (1910)

Oversight (foaled 1906 in Calvados Lower Normandy) was a French Thoroughbred racehorse. Bred by American sportsman William Kissam Vanderbilt at his Haras du Quesnay stud farm, he was out of the mare, First Sight, a daughter of the 1893 English Triple Crown champion, Isinglass. His sire was Halma, winner of the 1895 Kentucky Derby whom Vanderbilt bought in 1901 in the United States from Charles Fleischmann Sons.

Racing from age two through four, Oversight won important French races such as Prix du President de la Republique and the Prix Jean Prat before being retired to stud where he was not successful as a sire.
