= Robert Lehmann =

Robert Lehmann may refer to:

- Robert Lehmann (speed skater) (born 1984), German long track speed skater
- Robert Lehmann (psychologist), German forensic psychologist and researcher

== See also ==
- Robert Lehman (1891–1969), American banker, racehorse owner, art collector, and philanthropist
- Robert Lehmann-Nitsche (1872–1938), German anthropologist
