= Malicious (horse) =

American-bred Thoroughbred racehorse

- Sire: Omar Khayyam
- Grandsire: Marco
- Dam: Ridicule
- Damsire: Black Jester
- Sex: Gelding
- Foaled: 1927
- Country: United States
- Colour: Brown
- Breeder: Mrs. E. Turk
- Owner: Mrs. E. Turk
- Trainer: Lonnie Coperhaver
- Record: 185: 32-?-?
- Earnings: $14,755

Major wins
- Olympic Club Handicap

Honours
- Guest appearance - 1939 San Francisco World's Fair
- Last updated on December 21, 2007

Malicious (foaled 1927) was a Thoroughbred race horse sired by the winner of the 1917 Kentucky Derby, Omar Khayyam, out of Ridicule (by Black Jester). He began racing at the age of two and continued to compete until he was thirteen years old. During that time, he made 185 starts on virtually every race track in California as well as Mexico's Agua Caliente Racetrack. He won 32 times.

Malicious was an $800 claimer. Owned by Mrs. E. Turk, he was trained for several years by Lonnie Coperhaver, known as the "King of the Gypsies." Malicious was a closer who often came from far back to win. People started calling him "America's Two-Mile Champion," and then the press discovered him. Running at the same time as Seabiscuit, Malicious was also the center of adoring fans. He made a personal appearance at San Francisco's 1939 Golden Gate International Exposition, had people promoting merchandise in his name, and was interviewed on the radio. To ensure that people would stay for a full day's racing, Santa Anita race track would include a two-miler as its last race of the day for Malicious to run in.

Morton Cathro, a retired newspaperman, wrote of seeing Malicious in the last days of his career: "As a teenager in the autumn of 1939, this writer witnessed a series of Saturday marathons at Bay Meadows for top routers. Old Malicious showed up for the Nov. 11 finale, the four-mile Thornton Stakes. The weary road warrior, who hadn't started since that spring at Santa Anita, made his patented late surge to gain fourth in a blanket finish. That was his final race in the U.S. On Jan. 28, 1940, at age 13, one of the toughest iron horses of all time closed out his gallant career—a marathon in itself—by running second at Agua Caliente. His final paycheck was $100; his legacy, a claimer's place in the pantheon of sound, stout-hearted stakes horses—and in the hearts of a devoted public."

Malicious earned a total of $14,755.
