= Roseben =

American-bred Thoroughbred racehorse

- Sire: Ben Strome
- Grandsire: Bend Or
- Dam: Rose Leaf
- Damsire: Duke of Montrose
- Sex: Gelding
- Foaled: 1901
- Country: United States
- Colour: Bay
- Breeder: Thomas J. Carson at Dixiana Stud
- Owner: John A. Drake; Davy C. Johnson; Lucien O. Appleby
- Trainer: Enoch Wishard; Charles Oxx; Frank D. Weir
- Record: 111: 52-25-12
- Earnings: $75,110

Major wins
- Toboggan Handicap (1905); Claremont Handicap (1905); Manhattan Handicap (1905 & 1906); Bronx Highweight Handicap (1905); Bayview Handicap (1906); Fall Handicap (1906); Carter Handicap (1906); Sterling Stakes (1906); Flight Stakes (1906, 1907)

Honours
- U.S. Racing Hall of Fame (1956); Roseben Handicap at Belmont Park
- Last updated on December 16, 2007

Roseben (1901–1918) was an American Thoroughbred Hall of Fame race horse who grew to such an enormous size (one inch less than 18 hands) that he was known as "The Big Train." Because of his great size, he was slow to mature but when he finally got moving in his fourth, fifth and sixth years of racing, he was called the greatest sprinter of his time. He ran under weights as high as 130 pounds in 59 of his races, and as high as 140 pounds in 29 races. On more than one occasion, he won under 144 pounds, 146 pounds, and 147 pounds. Once he carried 150 pounds and finished second. He conceded huge weights to his opponents in 86 of his starts, once giving away 60 pounds at Brighton Beach Race Course in 1907 and still winning by two lengths.

== Racing Years ==
Purchased as a yearling by John Drake, Roseben did not reach the winner's circle until late in his three-year-old season. At two, he raced once and lost. At three, he raced nine times and won three races. After his first win, Drake auctioned him off, and the big horse went to Davy Johnson for $3,800. It took only a few days for Roseben to win his next two races for Johnson.

At four, Roseben raced twenty nine times, winning 19, placing in 5, and showing in 2. In his career, he went to the starting gate 111 times, and won almost half of the time. He was out of the money only 22 times, always conceding enormous weight.

In those days, handicapping races were common. Roseben ran in "overnighters," races where the weights were set the day before. On the day he would run, his people could take the weight or scratch. They had one hour to decide.

Roseben's most famous achievement came in a 1906 allowance race at Belmont Park, where he set an American record for seven furlongs, clocking in at 1:22. The previous record was 1:25. It was close to thirty years before another good sprinter, Clang, equalled the time at Arlington Park in 1935. A further twelve years passed before it was beaten by Honeymoon at Hollywood Park Racetrack. It took Bold Ruler to surpass the record at Belmont Park, fifty years after it was set.

(There appears to be some confusion concerning the race in which Roseben set his greatest record. In Robertson's book...see references...it was an allowance race at Belmont. On Roseben's Hall of Fame page, it states it was during his first running of the Manhattan.)

Roseben was a popular sensation for three seasons, running his races of seven or fewer furlongs, putting together winning streaks of six and seven races at a time. But at age eight, he wound up in three lowly claiming races. In his last start, where he could have been claimed for $1,000, he bowed a tendon. He was second and gaining when he, as the record book says, "stopped badly."

== Retirement ==
Retired, he was given to James Wadsworth, a New York State politician, who then gave the huge gelding to his daughter as a pleasure horse.

In 1918, Roseben died at the age of 17.
