= Bacon's =

American department store chain

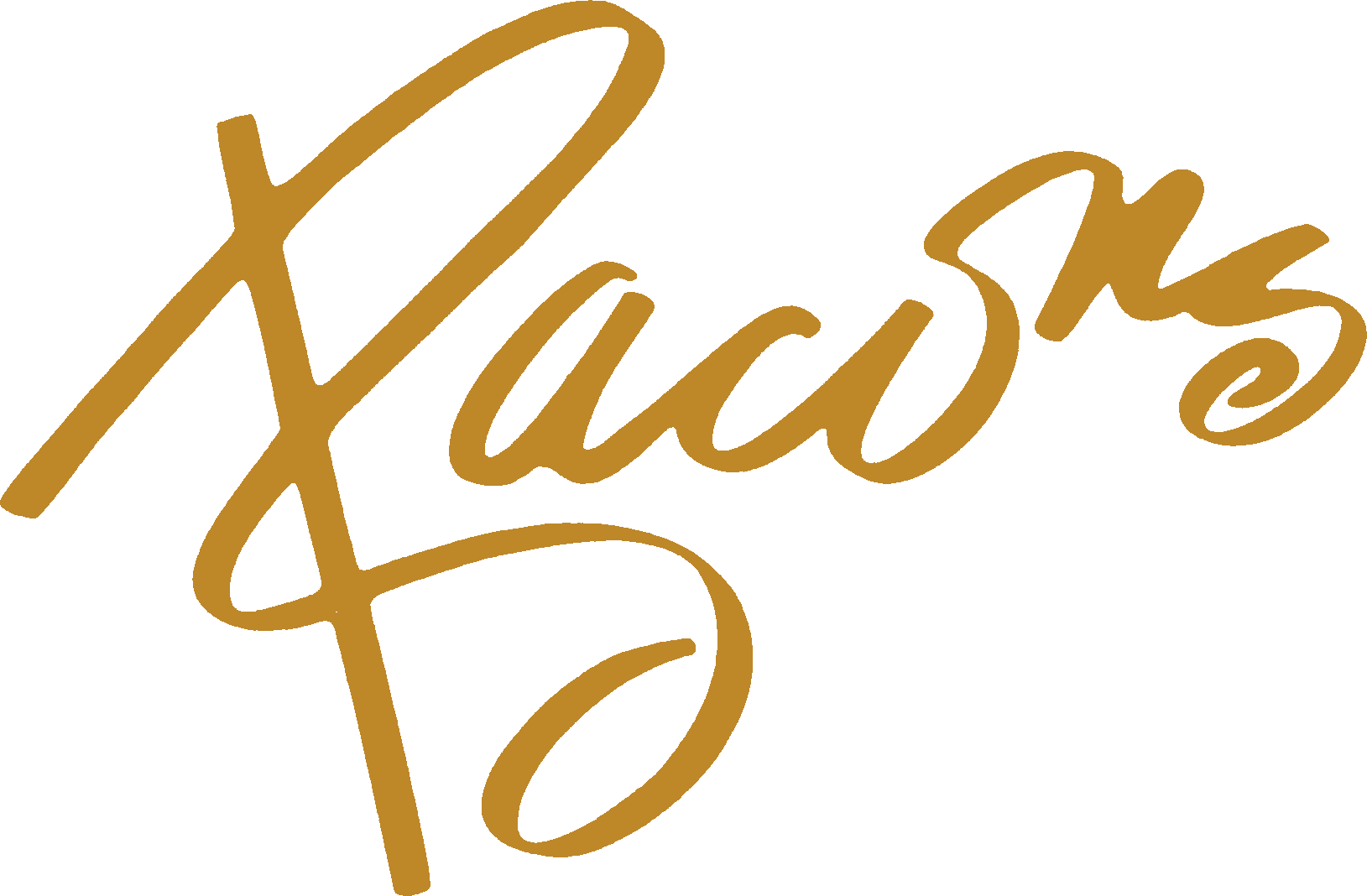

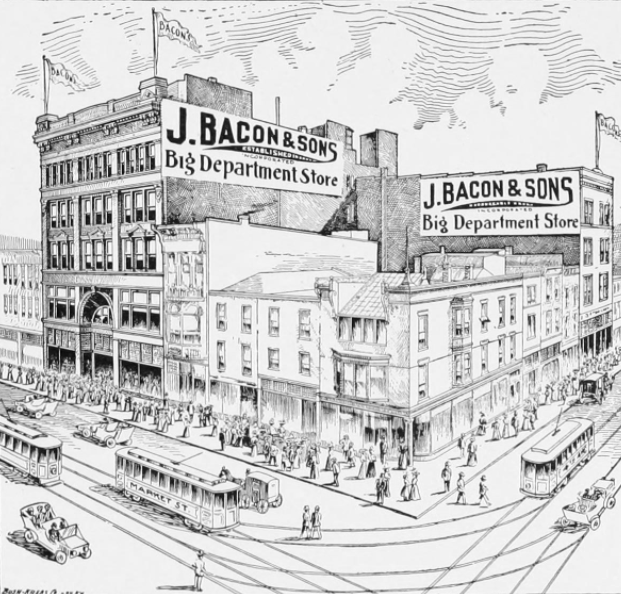
- Fourth and Market store, c. 1916
- Formerly: J. Bacon & Sons
- Company type: Department store
- Industry: Retail
- Founded: 1845; 181 years ago in Louisville, Kentucky
- Founder: Jeremiah Bacon
- Defunct: 1998; 28 years ago
- Fate: acquired by Dillard's
- Headquarters: Louisville, Kentucky, U.S.
- Number of locations: 5 (1998)
- Area served: Louisville, Kentucky, Southern Indiana, Owensboro, Kentucky
- Parent: Mercantile Stores

Bacon's was a chain of department stores based in Louisville, Kentucky, United States.

== History ==
Jeremiah Bacon opened a store called Bacon's Dry Goods in 1845 on Market Street near Hancock Street. In 1876 he moved into a structure four times larger than the original. In 1901, Bacon's opened a location on Fourth and Market streets that became its flagship store. The new 115,000-square-foot (10,700 m^{2}) building had entrances on each street and featured a distinctive spiraling atrium. The store remained open until September 6, 1972, when it closed to make way for the Kentucky International Convention Center.

In 1903, Bacon's sons sold the store to the large New York City-based dry goods conglomerate H.B. Claflin & Company, the owner of Stewart Dry Goods. The store was acquired by Ohio-based Mercantile Stores when Claflin went bankrupt in 1914. Bacon's opened a suburban location in St. Matthews in 1953; locations followed in Shively in 1956 and Bashford Manor Mall in 1972. The chain added a location in Owensboro, Kentucky, in 1977.

In 1982, Bacon's revived its Downtown Louisville presence with a store in the Louisville Galleria (later renamed Fourth Street Live!). The downtown store closed in 2003. In 1988, it opened a location in Mall St. Matthews.

Bacon's marketed itself as Kentucky's oldest department store, and often held elaborate sales and celebrations for its anniversaries. Bacon's also held "Midnight Madness" sales that were popular with shoppers. In the 1990s, Bacon's faced increasing competition from national chains, including Dillard's, which would often open up locations in the same shopping centers as Bacon's.

Some Louisville-based department store chain competitors included Stewart Dry Goods, Ben Snyders, and Kaufman-Straus.

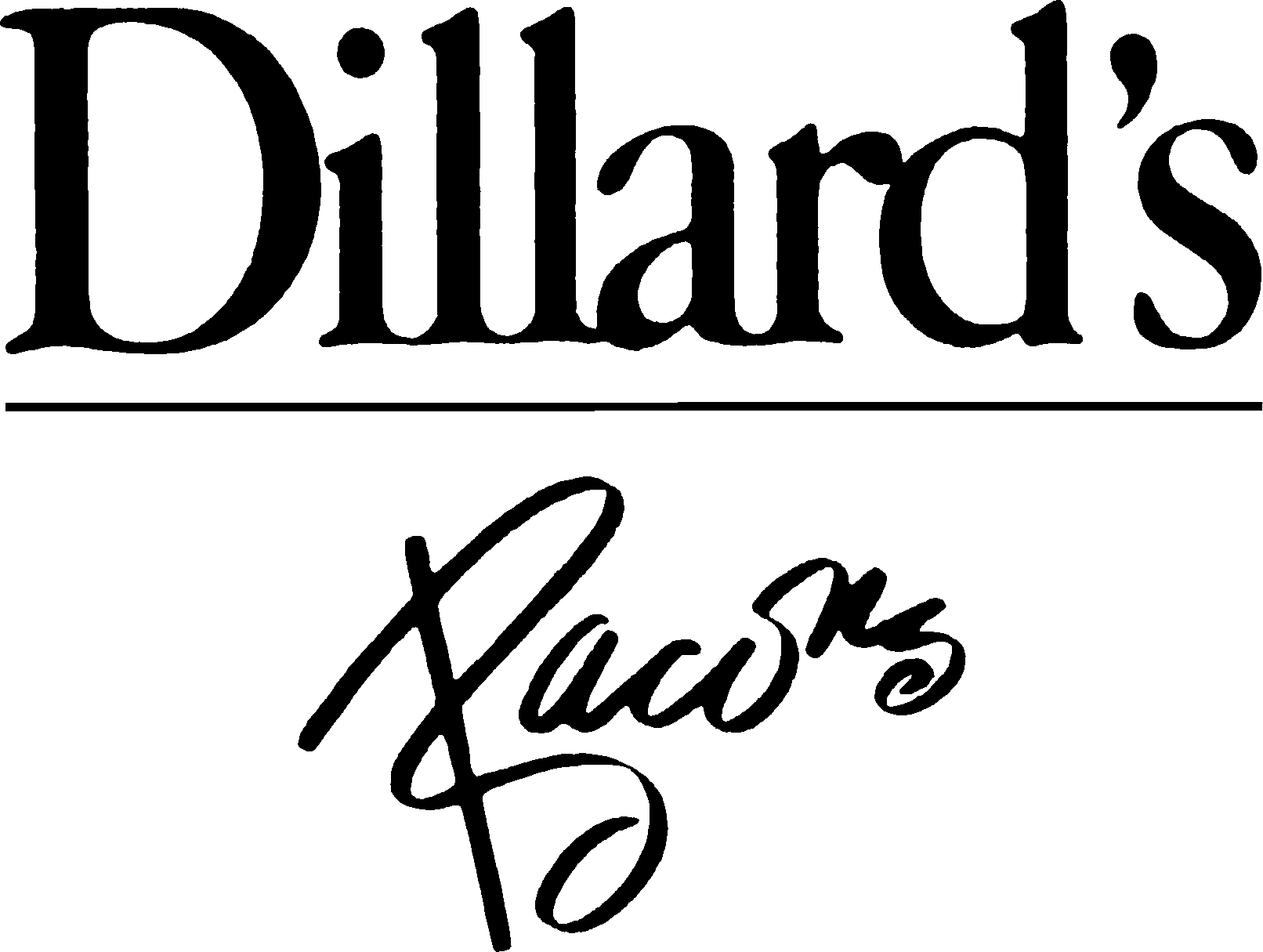
Dillard's-Bacon's Transition Logo

Mercantile Stores was acquired by Dillard's in 1998 and the Bacon's name was retired.

== Southern Indiana ==
Bacon's always had a presence in Indiana prior to the opening of its St. Matthews store in 1953. One of the earliest location in Indiana was on Spring Street in downtown Jeffersonville. By the mid-1950s, this store was determined to be too small and was replaced by a much larger store in the newly built Youngstown shopping center in 1956. The store in the Youngstown Shopping Center in Jeffersonville moved in 1990 to River Falls Mall.
