= Robert Lehmann (psychologist) =

Forensic psychologist and academic

Robert J. B. Lehmann
- Education: Technische Universität Berlin; University of Liverpool
- Known for: Research on sexual offending, child sexual exploitation material, offender risk assessment
- Scientific career
- Fields: Forensic psychology
- Workplaces: MSB Medical School Berlin

Robert J. B. Lehmann is a German forensic psychologist and researcher. He is a faculty member in the Department of Psychology at MSB Medical School Berlin. His work centers on sexual offending, offender risk assessment, and issues surrounding child sexual exploitation material (CSAM/CSEM).

== Life and career ==
=== Early life and education ===
Lehmann studied psychology at the Technische Universität Berlin. He later pursued advanced training in forensic psychology and quantitative methods at the University of Liverpool. In 2012, he volunteered with the Government of Canada under the supervision of forensic psychologist R. Karl Hanson, working on projects related to sexual offender risk assessment.

=== Academic career ===
Lehmann currently serves as a professor at MSB Medical School Berlin, where his research and teaching focus on behavioral analysis, forensic and criminal psychology, risk assessment, and quantitative/statistical methods applied to behavioral science.

He collaborates with practitioners and researchers across clinical, correctional, and community-based settings to better understand and prevent sexual and violent offending.

=== Research interests ===
Lehmann’s research has covered a variety of areas within forensic psychology, with a particular focus on high-risk or highly stigmatized populations. His primary research areas include:

- Risk-assessment and recidivism of violent and sexually deviant offenders.
- Non-violent and violent behaviors related to the possession of child sexual exploitation materials, with particular attention to online offending, mixed (online/offline) offending, offender typologies, associated risk factors, and preventative strategies.
- Public perceptions and stigma surrounding adults with sexual interests in children who do not engage in offending behaviors, including the development of prevention-oriented mental-health support options for such individuals.
- The development and evaluation of forensic assessment tools, such as reaction-time measures, structured risk-assessment instruments, and other metrics used to evaluate offense-related behaviors.

Taken together, Lehmann’s work advances scientific knowledge of sexual offending while informing practical approaches to prevention and risk reduction in both clinical and forensic contexts.

=== Selected publications ===
- Lehmann, R. J. B. A Review of Risk Factors for Online and Mixed Child Sexual Abuse Material Offending: What Is Being Researched? Trauma, Violence & Abuse, 2024.
- Lehmann, R. J. B. Beyond Images and Videos: A Narrative Review of Text-Based Child Sexual Exploitation and Abuse Material. Trauma, Violence & Abuse. (accepted/in press, 2025)
- Lehmann, R. J. B. Public stigmatizing reactions toward nonoffending pedophilic individuals seeking to relieve sexual arousal. (journal details to be completed).
- Lehmann, R. J. B., et al. Other peer-reviewed articles, review papers, and empirical studies are listed in his public profile.

=== Ethics and social context ===
Because much of Lehmann’s research deals with deeply sensitive and socially stigmatized issues — including sexual interest in minors, CSAM, and criminal offending — his work is often subject to intense ethical scrutiny and public debate. In his publications, he seeks to advance evidence-based risk assessment, prevention, and support strategies while acknowledging the complex moral, social, and legal dimensions of this field.

=== External identifiers and profiles ===
- ORCID: 0000-0003-1710-348X
- Professional profile at ResearchGate, including list of publications and academic collaborations.

== See also ==
- Forensic psychology
- Risk assessment
- Child sexual abuse material
- Recidivism
