= Fluvanna (horse) =

American-bred Thoroughbred racehorse

- Sire: Cudgel
- Grandsire: Broomstick
- Dam: High Pass
- Damsire: Ultimus
- Sex: Filly
- Foaled: 1921
- Country: United States
- Colour: Chestnut
- Breeder: Samuel Ross
- Owner: Salubria Stable
- Trainer: Max Hirsch
- Record: 23: 7–7–2
- Earnings: US$21,218

Major wins
- Astoria Stakes (1923); Floral Park Purse (1923); Demoiselle Stakes (1923); Kew Gardens Handicap (1924); Ben Brush Purse (1924)

Awards
- American Champion Two-Year-Old Filly (1923)

Honours
- Fluvanna Purse at Empire City Race Track

Fluvanna (1921) was an American Thoroughbred Champion racehorse. Bred by Samuel Ross, she was purchased at the Saratoga yearling sales in the summer of 1922 by Admiral Cary Grayson who raced her under his Salubria Stable colors. Out of the mare High Pass, her sire was the two-time American Champion Older Male Horse Cudgel.

Fluvanna was trained by future U.S. Racing Hall of Fame inductee Max Hirsch. Major wins in the 1923 Demoiselle and Astoria Stakes plus seconds in the Flash and Futurity Stakes while competing against the best two-year-old colts in the United States earned her retrospective American Champion Two-Year-Old Filly honors.
