= Phoenix Stakes (United States) =

American thoroughbred horse race

- Class: Grade II
- Location: Keeneland Race Course; Lexington, Kentucky
- Inaugurated: 1831
- Race type: Thoroughbred - Flat racing
- Website: www.keeneland.com

Race information
- Distance: 6 furlong sprint
- Surface: Dirt
- Track: Left-handed
- Qualification: Three-years-old & up
- Weight: Assigned
- Purse: $400,000 (since 2025)

The Phoenix Stakes is an American Thoroughbred horse race held annually at Keeneland Race Course in Lexington, Kentucky. Open to horses age three and older, it is contested on dirt over a distance of six furlongs and currently offers a purse of $400,000. Raced in early October, prior to 1989 it was run during the track's spring meeting. It became a Grade III event in 2000, then was upgraded to Grade II status in 2016.

Part of the Breeders' Cup Challenge series, the winner of the Phoenix Stakes automatically qualifies for the Breeders' Cup Sprint.

== History ==
Founded in 1831 with the name from the local Phoenix Hotel, it is the oldest thoroughbred horse race in North America though it has not been run continuously. Hosted by the Kentucky Association racetrack in Lexington until 1930, the event was restarted at Keeneland Race Course in 1937. From 1943 to 1945, the race was renewed as part of the Keeneland-at-Churchill Downs meetings. Over the years it has been called the Brennan, Chiles, Phoenix, Association, Phoenix Hotel Stakes and Phoenix Handicap.

The Phoenix Stakes was raced on dirt until 2006 when Keeneland Race Course installed a synthetic Polytrack surface. In 2014, the Polytrack was replaced by a new dirt surface. As a result of these changes, Keeneland maintains separate sets of track records.

The 2016 Phoenix Stakes was won by A. P. Indian while establishing a track record for the new dirt surface.

== Records ==
Speed record: (at current distance of 6 furlongs)

- 1:07.60 - Anjiz (1993 on old dirt surface)
- 1:08.43 - A. P. Indian (2016 on new dirt surface)

Most wins by a jockey:

- 5 – Julio C. Espinoza (1972, 1973, 1980, 1981, 1982)

Most wins by a trainer:

- 3 – D. Wayne Lukas (1991, 1994, 1998)

Most wins by an owner:

- 2 – Robert E. Lehmann (1972, 1973)
- 2 – Anthony L. Zuppardo (1980, 1981)
- 2 – Overbrook Farm (1991, 1994)
- 2 – Klaravich Stables (2012, 2013)
- 2 - Qatar Racing & Mrs. Fitriani Hay

== Winners since 1972 ==
Year	Winner	Age	Jockey	Trainer	Owner	Time
2026	Nakatomi	7	Irad Ortiz Jr.	Wesley A. Ward	Qatar Racing & Mrs. Fitriani Hay	1:09.93
2025	Nakatomi	6	Irad Ortiz Jr.	Wesley A. Ward	Qatar Racing & Mrs. Fitriani Hay	1:09.93
2024	Federal Judge	4	Flavien Prat	Brad H. Cox	Siena Farm LLC and WinStar Farm LLC	1:08.20
2023	Hoist the Gold	4	John R. Velazquez	Dallas Stewart	Dream Team One Racing Stable	1:19.13
2022	Manny Wah	6	Corey J. Lanerie	Wayne M. Catalano	Susan Moulton	1:10.31
2021	Special Reserve	5	Joel Rosario	Michael J. Maker	Paradise Farms Corp and David Staudacher	1:08.54
2020	Diamond Oops	5	Florent Geroux	Patrick Biancone	Diamond 100 Racing Club et al.	1:09.24
2019	Engage	4	José Ortiz	Steven M. Asmussen	Woodford Racing LLC	1:10.21
2018	Promises Fulfilled	3	Luis Saez	Dale Romans	Robert J. Baron	1:09.50
2017	Whitmore	4	Manuel Franco	Ron Moquette	Robert V. Lapenta, Southern Springs Stables, et al.	1:09.90
2016	A. P. Indian	6	Joe Bravo	Arnaud Delacour	Green Lantern Stables LLC (Richard & Sue Masson)	1:08.43
2015	Runhappy	3	Edgar S. Prado	Maria Borell	James McIngvale	1:09.96
2014	Work All Week	5	Florent Geroux	Roger Brueggemann	Midwest Thoroughbreds, Inc. (Richard & Karen Papiese)	1:09.00
2013	Sum of the Parts	4	Leandro Goncalves	Thomas M. Amoss	Klaravich Stables & William Lawrence	1:09.56
2012	Sum of the Parts	3	Julien Leparoux	Thomas M. Amoss	Klaravich Stables & William Lawrence	1:09.88
2011	Hoofit	4	Edgar S. Prado	H. Graham Motion	Jill Johnston	1:09.27
2010	Wise Dan	3	Rafael Bejarano	Charles Lopresti	Morton Fink	1:09.20
2009	Fatal Bullet	4	Eurico Rosa Da Silva	Reade Baker	Bear Stables, Ltd. (Danny Dion)	1:09.00
2008	Sing Baby Sing	5	Justin Shepherd	Jack Bruner	Tom Durant	1:08.48
2007	Off Duty	4	Larry Melancon	Lynn S. Whiting	John Pucek et al.	1:10.17
2006	Kelly's Landing	5	Rafael Bejarano	Eddie Kenneally	Summerplace Farm, LLC	1:09.94
2005	Elusive Jazz	4	Robby Albarado	Bobby C. Barnett	Stony Oak Farm, LLC	1:11.60
2004	Champali	4	Rafael Bejarano	Gregory D. Foley	Lloyd Madison Farms IV, LLC	1:08.72
2003	Najran	4	Javier Castellano	Nick Zito	Buckram Oak Farm	1:08.32
2002	Xtra Heat	4	Harry Vega	John E. Salzman, Sr.	Kenneth Taylor, et al.	1:10.13
2001	Bet On Sunshine	9	Calvin Borel	Paul J. McGee	David P. Holloway Racing	1:09.65
2000	Five Star Day	4	Garrett Gomez	C. Beau Greely	Columbine Stable LLC (Andrea S. Pollack)	1:07.80
1999	Richter Scale	5	Kent Desormeaux	Mary Jo Lohmeier	Nancy & Rick Kaster/ Nathan Fox	1:08.40
1998	Partner's Hero	4	Calvin Borel	D. Wayne Lukas	Willis Horton Stable	1:09.20
1997	Bet On Sunshine	5	Francisco Torres	Paul J. McGee	David P. Holloway racing	1:08.60
1996	Forest Wildcat	5	Joe Bravo	Ben Perkins, Sr.	Fred Seitz & New Farm	1:09.40
1995	Golden Gear	4	Craig Perret	P. Noel Hickey	Barry Golden	1:08.80
1994	Lost Pan	4	Donna Barton	D. Wayne Lukas	Jim McDonald & Overbrook Farm	1:09.40
1993	Anjiz	5	Donald Miller Jr.	Michael H. Bell	Gainsborough Farm	1:07.60
1992	British Banker	4	Dean Kutz	Peter M. Vestal	Dogwood Stable	1:09.20
1991	Deposit Ticket	3	Pat Day	D. Wayne Lukas	Overbrook Farm & D. Wayne Lukas	1:10.20
1990	Hadif	4	Dave Penna	Thomas J. Skiffington	Shadwell Farm	1:09.40
1989	Momsfurrari	5	Mike E. Smith	Glenn Wismer	Judy & Philip S. Maas	1:10.60
1988	Carload	6	Earlie Fires	Thomas F. Proctor	Glen Hill Farm	1:09.80
1987	Diapason	7	Patrick Johnson	Michael H. Bell	Helen C. Alexander	1:09.80
1986	Lucky North	5	Pat Day	William I. Mott	John A. Franks	1:11.00
1985	Harry 'N Bill	5	Mary Russ	Emanuel Tortora	Bee Bee Stable (John Bush)	1:09.60
1984	Timeless Native	4	Don Brumfield	Bud Delp	Hawksworth Farm (Harry Meyerhoff)	1:10.80
1983	Shot n' Missed	6	Leroy Moyers	William I. Mott	William F. Lucas	1:09.00
1982	Golden Derby	4	Julio C. Espinoza	Smiley Adams	F. E. Lehmann & J. R. Gaines	1:10.00
1981-1	Turbulence	5	Julio C. Espinoza	John C. Oxley	M/M C.H. Colpitt	1:09.40
1981-2	Zuppardo's Prince	5	Julio C. Espinoza	Clarence Breedlove	Anthony L. Zuppardo	1:09.40
1980	Zuppardo's Prince	5	Julio C. Espinoza	Clarence Breedlove	Anthony L. Zuppardo	1:09.40
1979	Shelter Half	4	Sam Boulmetis, Jr.	Beverly P. Hacker	Fourbrothers Stable	1:09.00
1978	Amadevil	4	Sam Maple	Hoss Inman	Paul & Orville Kemling	1:09.40
1977	It's Freezing	5	Eddie Maple	William R. O'Neill	Bwamazon Farm	1:09.60
1976	Gallant Bob	4	Don Brumfield	Joe D. Marquette	Robert P. Horton	1:08.40
1975	Delta Oil	6	Robert Breen	Forrest Kaelin	Dorothy Dorsett Brown	1:09.40
1974	Penholder	5	Buck Thornburg	Victor D. Karr	Mrs. Irene D. Karr	1:09.40
1973	Honey Jay	5	Julio C. Espinoza	Ike K. Mourar	Robert E. Lehmann	1:11.40
1972	Honey Jay	4	Julio C. Espinoza	Ike K. Mourar	Robert E. Lehmann	1:09.40

== Earlier winners ==
- 1971 - Great Mystery
- 1970 - Paderoso
- 1969 - Lithiot
- 1968 - Miracle Hill
- 1967 - Moccasin
- 1966 - Bay Phantom
- 1965 - Gallant Romeo
- 1964 - Choker
- 1963 - Editorialist (always race without a whip)
- 1962 - Editorialist
- 1961 - Eight Again
- 1960 - Court Affair
- 1959 - Bumpy Road
- 1958 - Ezgo
- 1957 - Bandit
- 1956 - Sea O' Erin
- 1955 - Sea O' Erin (raced for years)
- 1954 - Pomace
- 1953 - Pet Bully
- 1952 - Hill Gail
- 1951 - Mount Marcy
- 1950 - Mount Marcy
- 1949 - Miss Neal (Filly)
- 1948 - Coaltown
- 1947 - George Gains
- 1946 - Sirius
- 1945 - Best Effort
- 1944 - Roman Sox (Filly)
- 1943 - Miss Dogwood (Filly)
- 1942 - Devil Diver
- 1941 - Cherry Jam
- 1940 - Easy Mon
- 1939 - Torchy
- 1938 - Main Man
- 1937 - Preeminent
- 1931 to 1936 - RACE NOT RUN
- 1930 - Montanaro
- 1928 - Luxembourg
- 1927 - Percentage
- 1926 - Marconi
- 1925 - Almadel
- 1924 - Chacolet (Filly)
- 1923 - Minto II (Laverne Fator)
- 1922 - Advocate
- 1921 - General Haig
- 1920 - Buford
- 1919 - Opportunity
- 1918 - Embroidery (Filly)
- 1917 - Grover Hughes
- 1913 - Flora Fina (Filly) (Champion Handicap Female)
- 1912 - Mockler
- 1911 - Countless
- 1906 to 1910 - no race
- 1905 - Agile
- 1898 to 1904 - no race
- 1897 - Goshen
- 1896 - Prince Leif
- 1895 - Halma
- 1894 - Chant
- 1893 - Clifford
- 1892 - Wadsworth
- 1891 - Kingman
- 1890 - Ban Chief
- 1889 - Once Again (3rd: 1889 Kentucky Derby)
- 1888 - The Chevalier
- 1887 - Banburg
- 1886 - Grimaldi
- 1885 - Bersan
- 1884 - Admiral
- 1883 - Lord Raglan
- 1882 - Freeland
- 1881 - Sligo
- 1880 - Fonso (won the 1880 Kentucky Derby)
- 1879 - Falsetto
- 1878 - Himyar
- 1877 - Brademante (Filly)
- 1876 - Vagrant (Champion 2-Year-Old Male & Champion 3-Year-Old Male)
- 1875 - Ten Broeck
- 1874 - Aaron Pennington
- 1873 - Artist
- 1872 - Planatarium (Filly)
- 1871 - Molly Cad (Filly)
- 1870 - Enquirer
- 1868 - Crossland
- 1867 - Phoenix Belle (Filly)
- 1866 - Norway
- 1865 - Gold Ring (Filly)
- 1860 - Solferino
- 1856 - Parachute (Filly)
- 1855 - Balloon (Filly)
- 1854 - Charlie Ball
- 1853 - Lexington
- 1852 - Star Davis
- 1841 - Zenith
- 1840 - Berthune
- 1839 - Minstrel (Filly)
- 1838 - Mary Brennan (Filly)
- 1832 - Virginia (Filly)
- 1831 - McDonough

== Sire lines ==
- the Darley Arabian (1700c) sire line (all branched through the Eclipse (1764) line) produced 112 Stakes winners (72 colts/horses, 30 geldings, 10 fillies/mares), including all winners from 1989 to present. The main branches of this sire line are:
  - the Mercury (1764) branch produced 1 winner, most recently Planetarium in 1872
  - the King Fergus (1775) branch produced 16 winners. His sire line continued primarily through his son Hambletonian (1792) with 13 winners (exclusively through the Voltigeur (1847) line), continued primarily through his descendant Vedette (1854) with 12 winners, due primarily to his son Galopin (1872) with 9 winners (exclusively through the St. Simon (1881) line), most recently Whitmore in 2017
  - the Potoooooooo (1773) branch produced 94 winners (all branched through the Waxy (1790) line). The primary branch of this sire line is through Whalebone (1807), which has produced 85 winners. In turn, the primary branch continues through Sir Hercules (1826), which has produced 64 winners, and then the Birdcatcher (1833) branch which produced 58 winners. From Birdcatcher, the branch of The Baron (1842) has produced 52 winners (exclusively through the Stockwell (1849) line). Birdcatcher's grandson Doncaster (1870) sired Bend Or (1877), whose sire line accounts for 47 winners. The main branch of the Bend Or sire line continued through his son Bona Vista (1889) with 40 winners, exclusively through the Phalaris (1913) line, which has dominated in the last several decades (including all winners from 2018 to present), primarily through his son Pharos (1920) with 27 winners (exclusively through the Nearco (1935) line), most recently Nakatomi in 2025.
    - special notes:
      - the Whalebone (1807) branch produced two main lines: the primary branch of Sir Hercules (1826), and the secondary branch of Camel (1822) which produced 17 winners (exclusively through the Touchstone (1831) line). The Camel branch continued primarily through two of this grandsons: the Newminster (1848) branch (8 winners, primarily through the Hyperion (1930) line with 5 winners, most recently Delta Oil in 1975), and the Orlando (1841) branch (9 winners, primarily through the Commando (1900) line with 7 winners, most recently Honey Jay in 1973). A third branch through Waverley (exclusively through the Iago (1843) line) produced 5 winners, most recently Bumpy Road in 1959.
      - the Sir Hercules (1826) branch produced two main lines: the primary branch of Birdcatcher (1833), and the secondary branch of Faugh-a-Ballagh (1841) which produced 6 winners (exclusively through the Leamington (1853) line), most recently 1894 Phoenix Stakes winner Chant.
      - the Birdcatcher (1833) branch produced two main lines: the primary branch of The Baron (1870), and the secondary branch of Oxford (1857) which produced 6 winners (nearly exclusively through the Swynford (1907) line with 5 winners), most recently 1961 Phoenix Stakes winner Eight Again.
      - the Bend Or (1877) branch produced two main lines: the primary branch of Bona Vista (1889), and the secondary branch of Ormonde (1883) which produced 6 winners (nearly exclusively through the Teddy (1913) line with 5 winners), most recently 1992 Phoenix Stakes winner British Banker.
      - the secondary branch of Phalaris (1913), the less common Sickle (1924) branch (11 winners exclusively through the Raise a Native (1961) line, nearly exclusively through the Mr Prospector (1970) line with 10 winners), most recently Manny Wah in 2022.
- the Byerley Turk (1680c) sire line produced 25 winners (18 colts/horses, 2 geldings, 5 fillies/mares). The main branches of this sire (all branched through the Herod (1758) line) are:
  - the Florizel (1768) branch produced 16 winners, (all branched through the Diomed (1777) line). The main branches of this sire line are:
    - the Duroc (1806) branch produced 2 winners (all branched through the American Eclipse (1814) line), most recently Zenith in 1841
    - the Sir Archy (1805) branch produced 14 winners. The main branches of this sire line include:
      - the Saxe Weimer (1822) branch produced 1 winner, most recently Virginia in 1832
      - the Virginian (1815) branch produced 1 winner, most recently Berthune in 1840
      - the Sir Charles (1816) branch produced 1 winner, most recently Charley Ball in 1854
      - the Bertrand (1820) branch produced 2 winners, most recently Mary Brennan in 1838
      - the Timoleon (1813) branch produced 9 winners (all branched through the Boston (1833) line), continued primarily through the Lexington (1850) line with 7 winners, including his win in the 1853 Phoenix Stakes, and 6 progeny winners, most recently Sligo in 1881
  - the Woodpecker (1773) branch produced 9 winners (all branched through the Buzzard (1787) line). The main branches of this sire line are:
    - the Castrel (1801) branch produced 1 winner, most recently Kingman in 1891
    - the Selim (1802) branch produced 8 winners (all branched through the Sultan (1816) line). The main branches of this sire line are:
      - the Bay Middleton (1833) branch produced 3 winners (exclusively through the Tourbillon (1928) line), most recently Harry 'N Bill in 1985
      - the Glencoe (1831) branch produced 5 winners (nearly exclusively through the Vandal (1850) line with 4 winners), most recently Grover Hughes in 1917
- the Godolphin Arabian (1724c) sire line produced 6 winners (5 colts/horses, 1 filly/mare). The main branches of this sire (all branched through the West Australian (1850) line) are:
  - the Solon (1861) branch produced 2 winners, most recently Marconi in 1926
  - the Australian (1858) branch produced 4 winners, including:
    - Phoenix Belle (1864), winner of the 1867 Phoenix Stakes
    - the Spendthrift (1876) branch produced 3 winners, (all branched through the Intentionally (1956) line) most recently Carload in 1988

Phoenix Stakes winners with male-line descendants including other Phoenix Stakes winners

- Himyar (1878 winner) – 8 winners (6 colts/horses; 1 gelding; 1 filly/mare); most recently Honey Jay (1972; 1973)
- Lexington (1853 winner) – 6 winners (4 colts/horses; 2 fillies/mares); most recently Sligo (1881)
- Ten Broeck (1875 winner) – 2 colts/horses; most recently Bersan (1885)
- Enquirer (1870 winner) – 2 colts/horses; most recently Chant (1894)
- Gallant Romeo (1965 winner) – 2 winners (1 colt/horse; 1 gelding); most recently Momsfurrari (1989)
- Falsetto (1879 winner) – 1 colt/horse; Chant (1894)
