= Manuel (American horse) =

American-bred Thoroughbred racehorse

- Sire: Bob Miles
- Grandsire: Pat Malloy
- Dam: Espanita
- Damsire: Alarm
- Sex: Stallion
- Foaled: 1896
- Country: United States
- Colour: Bay
- Breeder: George James Long
- Owner: 1) George James Long; 2) Alfred H. & Dave H. Morris; 3) Frank Morel
- Trainer: Robert J. Walden
- Record: 21: 4-5-4
- Earnings: $9,740

Major wins
- Prospect Handicap (1898) American Classics wins: Kentucky Derby (1899)

Manuel (1896–1900) was an American Thoroughbred racehorse.

== Background ==
He was foaled in Kentucky and was a bay colt sired by Bob Miles out of the mare Espanita (by Alarm). He is related through his grandsire to 1907 Derby winner Pink Star. Manuel was bred by George James Long at his Louisville stud farm, Bashford Manor Stable.

== Racing career ==
Long retained ownership of Manuel throughout his two-year-old season, finally selling him in October 1898 to the Morris brothers for $15,000.^{[3]} He won the 1899 Kentucky Derby in what was deemed a very uneventful race. A few days after the Derby at Churchill Downs, Manuel injured his leg by stepping in a hole in the track which prompted his withdraw from racing for the rest of the season.

== Retirement ==
Manuel was sold to Frank Morel (through his agent J. Baker) as a four-year-old in October 1900 for $500 at the Morris Park sale. Manuel only raced for two seasons and did not produce any registered offspring. A 1910 Daily Racing Form article states that he died shortly thereafter as a four-year-old.

== Pedigree ==
Pedigree of Manuel
Sire Bob Miles 1881	Pat Malloy 1865	Lexington	Boston
Sire Bob Miles 1881	Pat Malloy 1865	Lexington	Alice Carneal
Sire Bob Miles 1881	Pat Malloy 1865	Gloriana	American Eclipse
Sire Bob Miles 1881	Pat Malloy 1865	Gloriana	Trifle
Sire Bob Miles 1881	Dolly Morgan 1862	Revenue	Trustee
Sire Bob Miles 1881	Dolly Morgan 1862	Revenue	Rosalie Somers
Sire Bob Miles 1881	Dolly Morgan 1862	Sally Morgan	Emancipation
Sire Bob Miles 1881	Dolly Morgan 1862	Sally Morgan	Lady Morgan
Dam Espanita 1890	Alarm 1869	Eclipse	Orlando
Dam Espanita 1890	Alarm 1869	Eclipse	Gaze
Dam Espanita 1890	Alarm 1869	Maud	Stockwell
Dam Espanita 1890	Alarm 1869	Maud	Countess of Albemarle
Dam Espanita 1890	Outstep 1885	Blue Eyes	Enquirer
Dam Espanita 1890	Outstep 1885	Blue Eyes	Buchu
Dam Espanita 1890	Outstep 1885	Etna	King Alfonso
Dam Espanita 1890	Outstep 1885	Etna	Elsie
