= His Eminence (horse) =

American-bred Thoroughbred racehorse

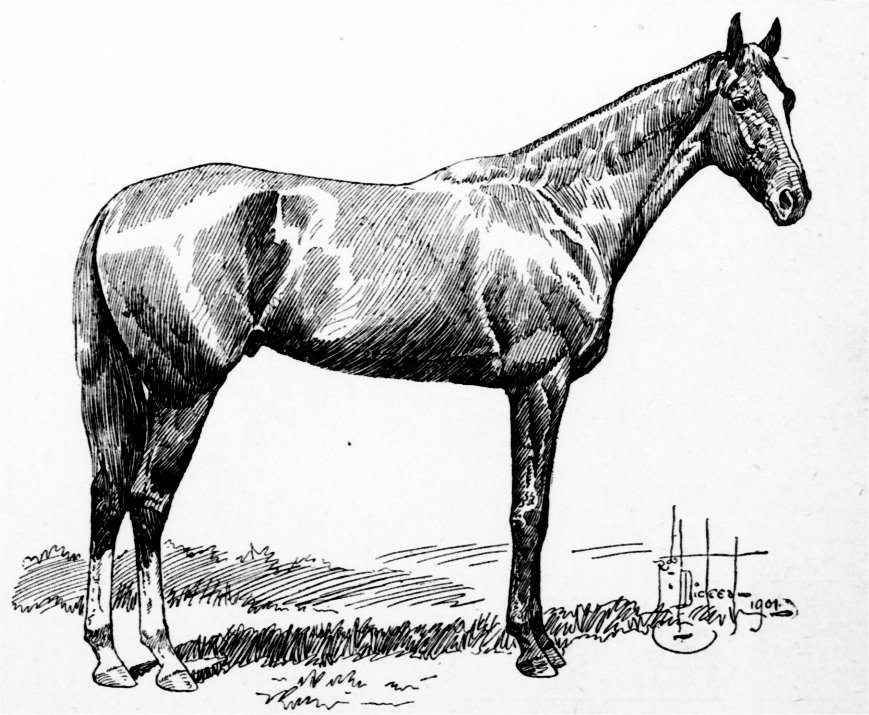
- 1901 drawing
- Sire: Falsetto
- Grandsire: Enquirer
- Dam: Patroness
- Damsire: Pat Malloy
- Sex: Stallion
- Foaled: 1898
- Country: United States
- Colour: Bay
- Breeder: Overton H. Chenault
- Owner: 1) J. B. Lewman; 2) Frank B. Van Meter; 3) Clarence Mackay; 4) Fred Gebhard; 5) A.C. Jaeger; 6) William Collins Whitney
- Trainer: Frank B. Van Meter
- Record: 53: 11-7-8
- Earnings: $16,295

Major wins
- Clark Handicap (1901); Omnium Handicap (1903) American Classics wins: Kentucky Derby (1901)

His Eminence (1898 – c.1906) was an American Thoroughbred racehorse that was bred in Kentucky and is best known for winning the 1901 Kentucky Derby. He was a bay colt sired by the great turf-racer Falsetto out of the mare Patroness. His dam (with His Eminence in utero) was sold to Overton H. Chenault at the 1897 Woodburn Stud dispersal sale for $75. As a yearling, he was sold to J. B. Lewman for $500^{[1]}.

His Eminence was ridden in the 1901 Derby by African-American jockey James Winkfield. His Eminence also won the Clark Handicap as a three-year-old.

The colt was purchased in the latter part of 1901 for $15,000 by millionaire racing enthusiast Clarence Mackay as a stud horse, but was later sold in 1902 due to the death of Mackay's father. His Eminence was then returned to racing by his new owner, Fred Gebhard, as a five-year-old, winning the 1903 Omnium Handicap at the Sheepshead Bay Race Track.

The stallion was once again sold at auction in September 1903 to A.C. Jaeger for $2,900. He was again sold to William Collins Whitney who trained him for steeplechasing, but His Eminence was killed while trying to jump a hurdle sometime before 1910.

== Pedigree ==
Pedigree of His Eminence
Sire Falsetto 1876	Enquirer 1867	Leamington	Faugh-a-Ballagh
Sire Falsetto 1876	Enquirer 1867	Leamington	Pantaloon Mare
Sire Falsetto 1876	Enquirer 1867	Lida	Lexington
Sire Falsetto 1876	Enquirer 1867	Lida	Lize
Sire Falsetto 1876	Farfaletta 1867	Australian	West Australian
Sire Falsetto 1876	Farfaletta 1867	Australian	Emilia
Sire Falsetto 1876	Farfaletta 1867	Elkhorna	Lexington
Sire Falsetto 1876	Farfaletta 1867	Elkhorna	Glencoda
Dam Patroness 1881	Pat Malloy 1865	Lexington	Boston
Dam Patroness 1881	Pat Malloy 1865	Lexington	Alice Carneal
Dam Patroness 1881	Pat Malloy 1865	Gloriana	American Eclipse
Dam Patroness 1881	Pat Malloy 1865	Gloriana	Trifle
Dam Patroness 1881	Inverness 1866	Macaroni	Sweetmeat
Dam Patroness 1881	Inverness 1866	Macaroni	Jocose
Dam Patroness 1881	Inverness 1866	Elfrida	Faugh-a-Ballagh
Dam Patroness 1881	Inverness 1866	Elfrida	Espoir
