= Bashford Manor Mall =

Coordinates: 38°12′00″N 85°39′59″W

- Location: Louisville, Kentucky, U.S.
- Opened: October 8, 1973; 53 years ago
- Closed: 2003
- Demolished: 2003
- Num. of stores: 67 (original mall)
- Num. of anchor tenants: 3 (original mall)
- Floor area: 540,000 square feet (50,000 m^{2})
- Floors: 1

Bashford Manor Mall was a 560,000-square-foot (52,000 m^{2}) enclosed mall in Louisville, Kentucky which opened in 1973 and once had about 85 stores, including Ayr-Way, Bacon's, and Ben Snyder's. It was closed and demolished in 2003.

== History ==
The mall was named for the surrounding neighborhood of Bashford Manor. It opened in 1973, with its main anchors being Bacon's, Ayr-Way, and Ben Snyder's. Over time, these anchors changed. Ayr-Way stores were acquired and rebranded by the Dayton-Hudson Corporation (now Target Corporation) in 1981. Ben Snyder's became Hess's in February 1987, which in turn became a Home Store for Bacon's in 1995. Both Bacon's stores were acquired and rebranded by Dillard's in 1998 before closing in February 2003. In the 1970s, the mall included a TV Den area with several televisions and seating for guests. The mall did not have a food court, but included several restaurants such as a Chi Chi's and Arby's.

== Decline and closure ==
In 1999, the mall had been purchased by Rubloff Developments of Detroit, who began to renovate it in 2001 with a complete renovation expected finished by the 2001 Christmas shopping season. Work only slowly progressed, with Target leaving the mall to relocate to a standalone store a block west. A Burlington Coat Factory was originally expected to replace the former Target at the mall, but the deal eventually fell through. Many mall tenants began to close or move their stores out of the mall due to the lack of customers. Further challenges included increased crime and vandalism which drove away more customers and tenants, as had happened years earlier with the Raceland Mall located only a few miles further south on Bardstown Road. Only one tenant—a dry cleaner—remained by mid-2003. The mall officially closed permanently in mid-2003. Demolition commenced in late 2003. An abandoned Dillard's store, not owned by the mall, remained standing. The Dillard's store was finally razed in 2008, with a Burlington Coat Factory store being built on part of its footprint. It opened for business in March 2009.

The former mall and its environs have been the site of a successful revitalization effort. The Target store relocated a block west in October 2002, with a strip of stores being added. Walmart and Lowe's were built on the previous footprint of the mall and were completed in 2005 and 2006, respectively. In addition, all of Bashford Manor Lane was widened to three lanes with trees and other landscaping added.

The mall was briefly mentioned in national news stories when 12-year-old Ann Gotlib disappeared from the mall on June 1, 1983. Her body was never found, but a break in the case in 2008 led investigators to felon Gregory L. Oakley Jr., who died six years earlier after being released from prison.

== See also ==
- Bashford Manor Stable
