= Omar Khayyam (horse) =

British-bred Thoroughbred racehorse

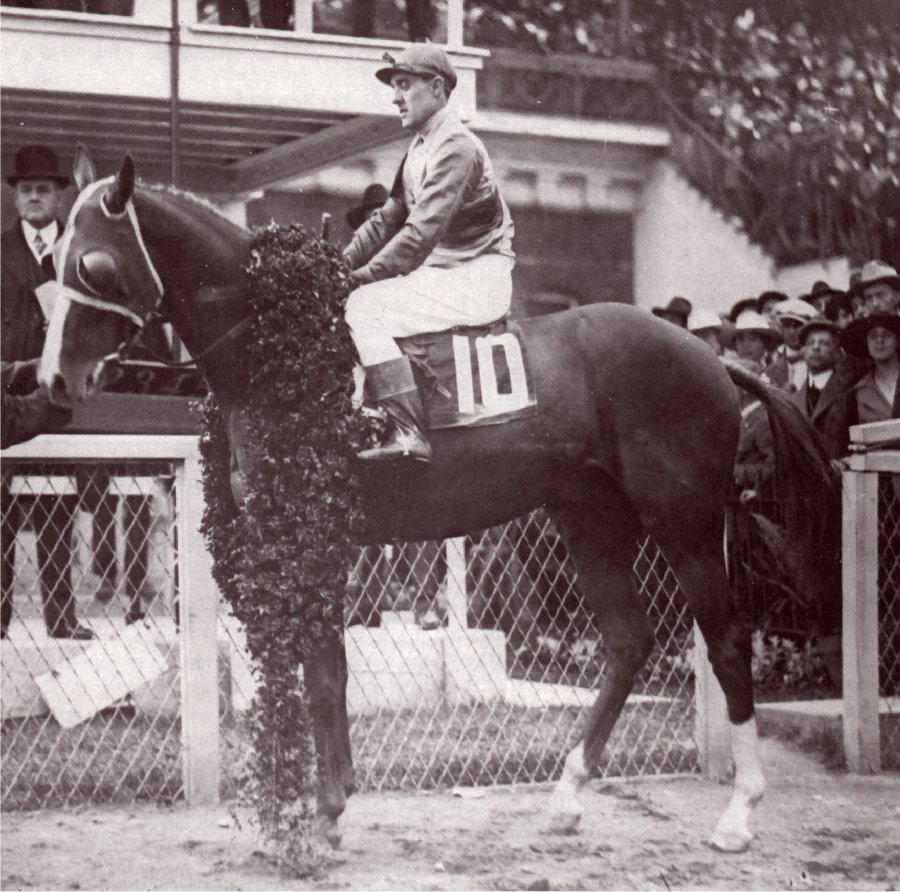
- Sire: Marco
- Grandsire: Barcaldine
- Dam: Lisma
- Damsire: Persimmon
- Sex: Stallion
- Foaled: 1914
- Country: Great Britain
- Colour: Chestnut
- Breeder: Sir John Robinson
- Owner: C. K. G. Billings & Frederick Johnson; Wilfrid Viau (from May 1917)
- Trainer: Charles T. Patterson; Richard F. Carmen Sr. (from May 1917)
- Record: 28: 12-5-4
- Earnings: $57,010

Major wins
- Brooklyn Derby (1917); Kenner Stakes (1917); Travers Stakes (1917); Saratoga Cup (1917); Lawrence Realization Stakes (1917); Havre de Grace Handicap (1917); Pimlico Autumn Handicap (1917); Marines' Liberty Bond Handicap (1918); Rennert Handicap (1919) American Classics wins: Kentucky Derby (1917)

Awards
- American Co-Champion 3-Yr-Old Male Horse (1917)
- Last updated on October 28, 2019

Omar Khayyam (1914–1938) was a British-born Thoroughbred racehorse who was sold as a yearling to an American racing partnership and became the first foreign-bred horse to win the Kentucky Derby. He was named for the famous Persian mathematician, poet, and astronomer, Omar Khayyam.

== Bloodlines ==
Omar Khayyam was out of the mare Lisma, daughter of the champion sire Persimmon; his success on the track included wins in The Derby, St. Leger Stakes and Ascot Gold Cup. He was sired by Marco, a leading three-year-old in England in 1895 and great-grandson of the first English Triple Crown Champion, West Australian.

== Racing career ==
Trained by Charles Patterson, Omar Khayyam was sent to the track in 1916 as a two-year-old. His most important result that year was a second to Campfire in the Hopeful Stakes. In his three-year-old season, no U.S. Triple Crown series had yet been formalized; the Kentucky Derby and Preakness Stakes were held on the same day. Choosing to run in the Derby, Omar Khayyam was fourth in one and one-eighth miles (1+^{1}/_{8} miles or 1.81 km) prep race at Lexington to Ticket. As a result, he was sent off at 13–1 odds in the Kentucky Derby. Ridden by jockey Charles Borel, Omar Khayyam unleashed a powerful stretch run to come from tenth place to win over the favorite Ticket.

Three weeks after his Derby win, Omar Khayyam was sold as part of his owner's multi-horse dispersal auction held on the grounds of New York's Belmont Park. He was purchased by Canadian biscuit manufacturer Wilfrid Viau. For his new owner, the colt went on to win the Prospect Handicap at Jamaica Race Course; the Brooklyn Derby at the old Aqueduct Racetrack; and (at the Saratoga Race Course) the Kenner Stakes, the Saratoga Cup and the Travers Stakes. In Maryland Omar Khayyam won the Havre de Grace Handicap and – despite a 30-pound handicap – set a new Pimlico Race Course track record in winning the Pimlico Autumn Handicap.

After the other entrants were scratched, the October 18, 1917, John R. McLean Memorial Championship at Laurel Park Racecourse turned into a match race between Omar Khayyam and August Belmont Jr. Belmont Stakes winner, Hourless. Earlier that year, Omar Khayyam had beaten Hourless in the 1½ mile Lawrence Realization Stakes and in the Brooklyn Derby. This time, however, Hourless won by a length. Despite Omar Khayyam's earlier wins over Hourless and the fact that he had earned $20,000 more than Hourless in purses that year (in more starts with greater consistency), Omar Khayyam shared American Champion Three-Year-Old Male Horse honors with Hourless.

As a four-year-old in 1918, Omar Khayyam's chances of winning were limited due to his high weight assignments; however, he won the Marines' Liberty Bond Handicap. The following year, at five, he won the Rennert Handicap at Pimlico under Clarence Kummer before being retired to stand at Claiborne Farm in Paris, Kentucky for the 1920 season.

== Progeny ==
In 1929, Omar Khayyam was moved to the J. P. Jones stud in Charlottesville, Virginia, where he remained until his death in 1938. Among his offspring was Malicious, an “iron horse” who won 32 races out of 185 career starts. Another son, Mr. Khayyam, won the 1933 Wood Memorial Stakes and the 1934 Metropolitan Handicap. Yet another, Balko, won the 1930 Toboggan and Baltimore Handicaps.

== Pedigree ==
Pedigree of Omar Khayyam
Sire Marco 1892	Barcaldine 1878	Solon	West Australian
Sire Marco 1892	Barcaldine 1878	Solon	Birdcatcher Mare
Sire Marco 1892	Barcaldine 1878	Ballyroe	Belladrum
Sire Marco 1892	Barcaldine 1878	Ballyroe	Bon Accord
Sire Marco 1892	Novitiate 1882	Hermit	Newminster
Sire Marco 1892	Novitiate 1882	Hermit	Seclusion
Sire Marco 1892	Novitiate 1882	Retty	Lambton
Sire Marco 1892	Novitiate 1882	Retty	Fern
Dam Lisma 1907	Persimmon 1893	St. Simon	Galopin
Dam Lisma 1907	Persimmon 1893	St. Simon	St. Angela
Dam Lisma 1907	Persimmon 1893	Perdita	Hampton*
Dam Lisma 1907	Persimmon 1893	Perdita	Hermione
Dam Lisma 1907	Luscious 1894	Royal Hampton	Hampton*
Dam Lisma 1907	Luscious 1894	Royal Hampton	Princess
Dam Lisma 1907	Luscious 1894	Alveole	Crafton
Dam Lisma 1907	Luscious 1894	Alveole	Ste. Alveole

* Omar Khayyam is inbred 4D × 4D to the stallion Hampton, meaning that he appears twice fourth generation on the dam side of his pedigree.

== See also ==
- Campfire (horse)
- Charles B. Borel
- Hourless
