= Azra (horse) =

American thoroughbred racehorse

- Sire: Reform
- Grandsire: Leamington
- Dam: Albia
- Damsire: Alarm
- Sex: Stallion
- Foaled: 1889
- Country: United States
- Color: Bay
- Breeder: George J. Long
- Owner: Bashford Manor Stable
- Trainer: John H. Morris
- Record: 23: 5-3-7
- Earnings: $20,710

Major wins
- Champagne Stakes (1891); Clark Handicap (1892); Travers Stakes (1892) American Classic Race wins: Kentucky Derby (1892)

Azra (1889–1909) was an American Thoroughbred racehorse. He was bred in Kentucky by George J. Long and raced under the colors of his Bashford Manor Stable. His sire was Reform, a son of the very important sire Leamington. Azra was out of the mare Albia whose sire, Alarm, also sired Himyar.

Trained by John H. Morris, Azra's regular jockey was Alonzo Clayton. At age two, he won one of the important races for his age group, the Champagne Stakes. At age three, Azra won the Kentucky Derby in a race against just two other horses, the smallest field in the history of the race. He went on to win the Clark Handicap and the Travers Stakes.

Azra was not successful at stud and died in 1909 at the age of 20 at Bashford Manor Stable.

== Pedigree ==
Pedigree of Azra
Sire Reform 1871	Leamington 1853	Faugh-a-Ballagh	Sir Hercules
Sire Reform 1871	Leamington 1853	Faugh-a-Ballagh	Guiccioli
Sire Reform 1871	Leamington 1853	Pantaloon Mare	Pantaloon*
Sire Reform 1871	Leamington 1853	Pantaloon Mare	Daphne
Sire Reform 1871	Stolen Kisses 1864	Knight of Kars	Nutwith
Sire Reform 1871	Stolen Kisses 1864	Knight of Kars	Pocahontas*
Sire Reform 1871	Stolen Kisses 1864	Defamation	Iago
Sire Reform 1871	Stolen Kisses 1864	Defamation	Caricature*
Dam Albia 1881	Alarm 1869	Eclipse	Orlando
Dam Albia 1881	Alarm 1869	Eclipse	Gaze
Dam Albia 1881	Alarm 1869	Maud	Stockwell*
Dam Albia 1881	Alarm 1869	Maud	Countessofalbemarl
Dam Albia 1881	Elastic 1871	Kentucky	Lexington
Dam Albia 1881	Elastic 1871	Kentucky	Magnolia
Dam Albia 1881	Elastic 1871	Blue Ribbon	Revenue
Dam Albia 1881	Elastic 1871	Blue Ribbon	Parachute

* Azra is inbred 4S x 5S to the stallion Pantaloon, meaning that he appears fourth generation and fifth generation (via Caricature) on the sire side of his pedigree.

* Azra is inbred 4S x 5D to the mare Pocahontas, meaning that she appears fourth generation on the sire side of his pedigree, and fifth generation (via Stockwell) on the dam side of his pedigree.
