= Alonzo Clayton =

American jockey

Lonnie Clayton
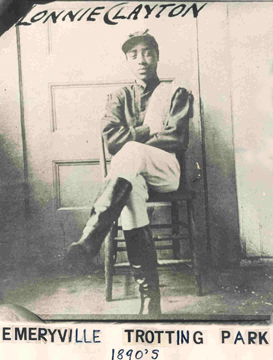

Personal information
- Born: January 4, 1876 Mississippi, U.S.
- Died: March 17, 1917 (aged 41) Los Angeles, California
- Resting place: Evergreen Cemetery, Los Angeles, California
- Occupation: Jockey

Horse racing career
- Sport: Horse racing
- Career wins: Not found

Major racing wins
- Champagne Stakes (1891); Jerome Handicap (1891); Alabama Stakes (1892); Clark Handicap (1892, 1897); Latonia Oaks (1892, 1898); Travers Stakes (1892); Monmouth Handicap (1893); Spring Stakes (1893); St. Leger Handicap (1893); Dash Stakes (1894); Dolphin Stakes (1894); Kentucky Oaks (1894, 1895); Arkansas Derby (1895); Ocean Handicap (1895); Double Event Stakes (part 1) (1896); Flatbush Stakes (1896); Laureate Stakes (1896); Twin City Handicap (1896); Winged Foot Handicap (1896); Fall Handicap (1897); Flight Stakes (1897); Municipal Handicap (1897); September Stakes (1897); California Oaks (1898) American Classic Race wins: Kentucky Derby (1892)

Racing awards
- Leading rider at Churchill Downs (1893, Fall)

Honors
- Arkansas Sports Hall of Fame (2012)

Significant horses
- Azra, Ben Holladay, Briar Sweet, Halma, Ornament, Requital, Voter

Alonzo Clayton (January 4, 1876 – March 17, 1917) was an American jockey in Thoroughbred horse racing described by author Edward Hotaling, as "one of the great riders of the New York circuit all through the 1890s" and who holds the record as the youngest jockey to ever win the Kentucky Derby.

== Biography ==
An African American, Lonnie Clayton was most likely born in Mississippi, on January 4, 1876, which is the date of birth and place of birth that are given on his death certificate. He was one of the nine children of Robert and Evaline Clayton. At age ten, his family moved to North Little Rock, Arkansas, where he attended school and worked as a gofer for a hotel and as a shoeshine boy to help support his family. According to the Central Arkansas Library System's Encyclopedia of Arkansas History & Culture, a correspondent for the Thoroughbred Record wrote in 1896 that Clayton attended school and was considered "exceptionally bright."

At age twelve the diminutive Lonnie Clayton left home and made his way north to Chicago's Washington Park Race Track where his brother Albertus was a jockey for prominent Thoroughbred horse racing stable owner, Lucky Baldwin. Lonnie Clayton was given a job as a stablehand and exercise rider for the Baldwin stable then the following year he moved east to the Clifton Race Track in New Jersey where in 1890 the fourteen-year-old began his professional riding career. Immediately successful, in 1891 at Morris Park Racetrack in The Bronx, New York, Clayton won the important Champagne Stakes aboard Bashford Manor Stable's two-year-old colt, Azra. On May 11, 1892, he rode Azra to victory in the Kentucky Derby which at age fifteen made him the youngest jockey in history to ever win the Derby. Clayton and Azra followed up their Derby success with victories in the Clark Handicap and the Travers Stakes.

At Monmouth Park in New Jersey Clayton won the 1893 Monmouth Handicap and went on to win the fall riding title at Churchill Downs. One of the leading money winners on the East Coast racing circuit during the 1890s, he won races from New York to California. He captured back-to-back runnings of the Kentucky Oaks in 1894 and 1895, the latter a year in which he won 144 races and finished in the money sixty percent of the time. In 1895 he won the Arkansas Derby and in 1896 finished third in the Preakness Stakes aboard the filly, Intermission.

== The 1898 Incident at Morris Park ==
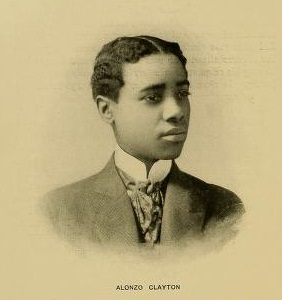
Alonzo Clayton, circa 1898

On October 14, 1898, Clayton was riding Warrenton in the third race at Morris Park in the Bronx, and both he and the horse had a terrible race. As he was weighing out, someone said something that provoked the jockey to strike a spectator, Henry Bolomey, across the face with the butt end of his riding whip. The track stewards find Clayton $200.00. Two hundred dollars in 1898 would correspond to $6,578.39 in 2021 dollars.

Bolomey, a Brooklyn ice dealer, sued Clayton in civil court for $10,000.00 for pain and suffering, and the case was tried on February 21, 1900. Bolomey received a judgment of $1,250.00 in damages, plus the plaintiff's costs of $201.98, for a total of $1,451.98. According to an online inflation calculator, that judgment would be $47,189.87 in 2021 dollars.

Henry Bolomey's attorney began to actively attempt to search for Clayton's property in an attempt to collect the judgment, but each time he tried he was unsuccessful as Clayton all but vanished from the horse racing circuit for about a year. When Clayton returned to the turf at New York's Aqueduct Racetrack, the Queens County Deputy Sheriff arrested him on April 22, 1901, on a body execution for non-payment of a civil judgment, just as he was about to ride The Golden Prince in the fifth race.

Clayton was put in the Queens County Jail in Long Island City. He was incarcerated for at least two months, and was released at some point after mid-June 1901. It is not known if he and Bolomey reached a financial settlement.

== Other Financial Difficulties ==
Lonnie Clayton's early success had allowed him to acquire a property in Little Rock, Arkansas, upon which he competed construction of a new home in early 1895. Described by the Arkansas Gazette as the "finest house on the North Side," it was designed in the fashion of Queen Anne style architecture in the United States and is today known as Engelberger House, and since 1990 has been listed on the National Register of Historic Places. An astute businessman, in 1897 Clayton also built a commercial building at 617–619 Main Street in Little Rock, which stood until about 1980.

A lien of $600 was placed on Clayton's house in 1897, and two separate liens of $900 and $500 were added in 1899. In 1900, Clayton was sued by his older brother, Charles Clayton, who won a judgment for $511.00. Another judgment against Clayton in 1900 was for $160.05, and then another judgment for $75.00. Records also show that Clayton did not pay the real estate taxes on his North Argenta house and property in 1899.

Clayton sold his house on July 12, 1900, and quickly paid off his back real estate taxes, the liens, and the judgment he owed his brother and another Little Rock businessman. He also sold his North Little Rock commercial building on April 13, 1901, just nine days before his eventual arrest for non-payment of the judgment to Henry Bolomey.

== Later years ==
By the start of the 20th century, opportunities to ride for African-Americans soon vanished as stable owners switched to using white riders only. Within a few years, African-American jockeys, who had dominated racing for centuries and who had played a major role in bringing Thoroughbred racing to the forefront of American sport, were forced out of the business. Since 1909, no African-American jockey has ridden a winner in any major American Graded stakes race.

An 1896 report and a 1900 report in the Brooklyn Daily Eagle stated that Clayton planned to join other black jockeys riding in Europe but no records have been found to confirm he actually went there. Clayton moved west to try to find work, and was riding in Butte, Montana, and Memphis, Tennessee, before moving to Vancouver, British Columbia, where it is not known if he was a jockey or a businessman.

Clayton lived his last few years in California where he worked as a hotel bellhop. He died at age forty one on March 17, 1917, of chronic pulmonary tuberculosis. He is buried at Evergreen Cemetery in Los Angeles.

Alonzo Clayton's accomplishments in racing were recognized by the Arkansas Sports Hall of Fame with his induction in 2012.
