= Bashford Manor Stable =

American horse racing and breeding operation

Coordinates: 38.200947°N 85.668318°W

- Type: Horse breeding Farm & Thoroughbred Racing Stable
- Industry: Thoroughbred Horse racing
- Founded: 1887
- Defunct: 1922
- Headquarters: 2040 Bashford Manor Lane; Louisville, Kentucky
- Key people: George James Long, owner

Bashford Manor Stable was an American Thoroughbred racing and breeding operation in Louisville, Kentucky owned by George James Long.

In 1874 James Bennett Wilder built a home on farm acreage he called Bashford Manor. In 1887 George Long purchased Bashford Manor and developed it into a leading Thoroughbred horse farm which bred three Kentucky Derby winners. To stock his new breeding operation. George Long acquired horses from the Erdenheim Stud of Norman W. Kittson. Following the May 1888 death of Norman W. Kittson, in November his estate auctioned the bloodstock and Long purchased the sire Alarm and two of his broodmare daughters, Luminous and Albia. The then nineteen-year-old Alarm had notably been the sire of Himyar and Panique. Alarm died at Bashford Manor in 1895 and was buried in the farm's equine cemetery.

The stable bred and raced Azra who won the 1892 Derby and Sir Huon who won it in 1906. Under Long's name, he raced homebred Hindus who won the 1900 Preakness Stakes. As well, George Long bred Manuel who won the 1899 Derby for Alfred & Dave Morris.

The Thoroughbred operation continued until 1922 when the bloodstock was sold. The home remained in Long's family until being sold in 1951. The property was annexed by the City of Louisville in 1953. The barns were torn down in 1970 and the house in 1973. The Bashford Manor area of Louisville was developed into residential homes and a shopping mall.

Churchill Downs in Louisville honors the racing and breeding stable with the annual running of the Bashford Manor Stakes.
