= Margrave (American horse) =

American-bred Thoroughbred racehorse

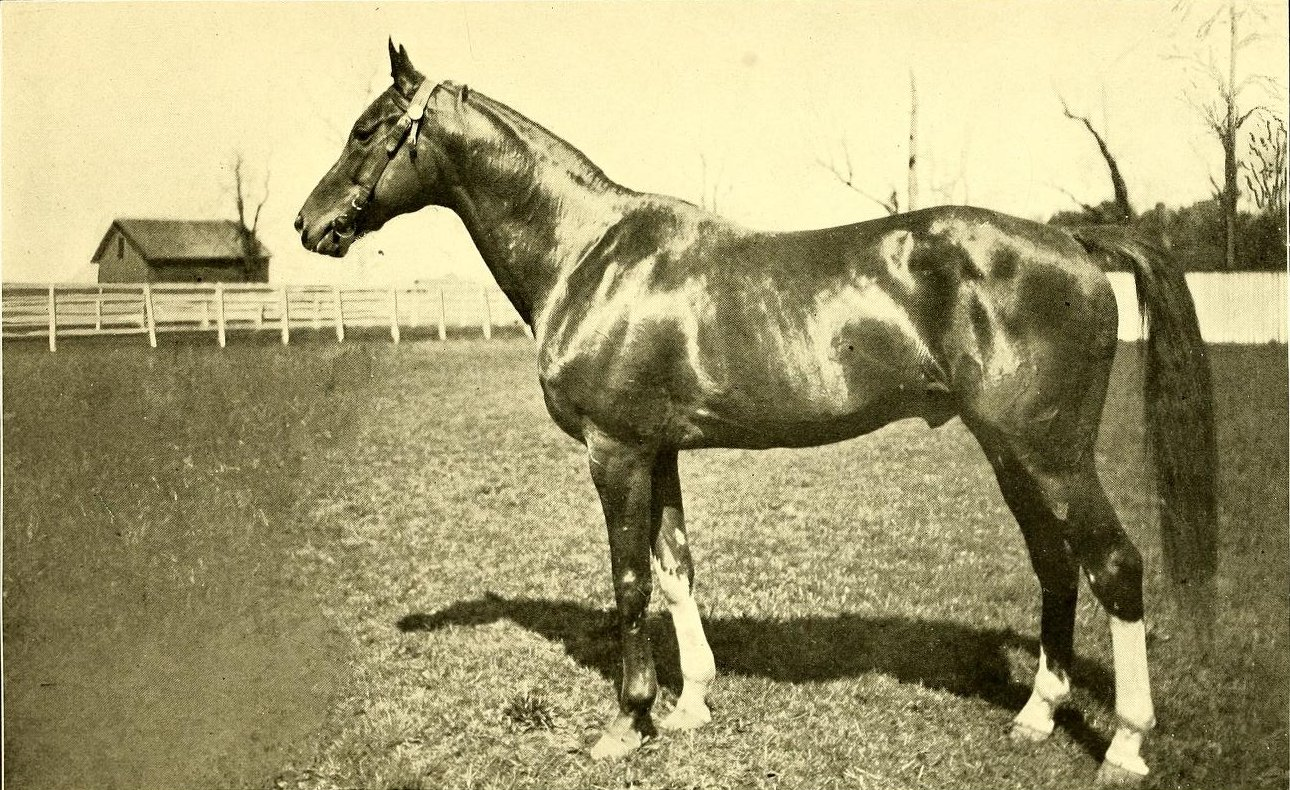
- Margrave at Nursery Stud, Lexington, Kentucky
- Sire: St. Blaise
- Grandsire: Hermit
- Dam: Lady Margaret
- Damsire: The Ill-Used
- Sex: Stallion
- Foaled: 1893
- Country: United States
- Colour: Chestnut
- Breeder: August Belmont Jr.
- Owner: Blemton Stable
- Trainer: Byron McClelland

Major wins
- Boulevard Stakes (1896); Hempstead Handicap (1896); Tidal Stakes (1896) American Classics wins: Preakness Stakes (1896)
- Last updated on 2019-07-07

Margrave (foaled 1893 in Kentucky) was an American Thoroughbred racehorse who won the 1896 Preakness Stakes, a race that would become the second leg of the U.S. Triple Crown series.

== Breeding ==
Margrave was bred by August Belmont Jr. at his Nursery Stud near Lexington, Kentucky. He was sired by 1883 Epsom Derby winner St. Blaise who had originally been imported into the United States by August Belmont Sr. to stand at his Nursery Stud which at the time was located in Babylon, New York. After Belmont Sr.'s death in 1890, St. Blaise was sold several times and before Belmont Jr. bought him back. Margrave's dam was Lady Margaret, a Belmont family bred multiple stakes winning mare who also was the dam of Masterman, winner of the 1902 Belmont Stakes. Lady Margaret was sired by the Belmont stallion The Ill-Used who was the sire of other very good runners including His Highness, who won the 1891 Futurity Stakes, Forester, winner of the 1882 Withers and Belmont Stakes, Jacobus who won the 1883 Preakness Stakes plus 1892 American Champion Two-Year-Old Filly Lady Violet.

== Racing ==
Margrave was trained by Byron McClelland who had previously won the 1895 Kentucky Derby with Halma and the 1894 Belmont Stakes with Henry of Navarre. As a two-year-old, Margrave won two minor races and notably beat Ben Brush while finishing second in the 1895 Great Eastern Handicap at Sheepshead Bay Race Track.

Racing at age three, Margrave was never beaten in five outings. In addition to his Preakness Stakes win at Gravesend Race Track, at that same track he also won the 1896 Boulevard Stakes and Hempstead Handicap and at Sheepshead Bay, the Tidal Stakes.

Margrave met with limited success as a stallion for his owner's Nursery Stud but did produce 1902 Queens County Handicap winner Margraviate. In 1906, Belmont gave Margrave to the New York Breeding Bureau to be used as a sire for work horses.
