= Reapers Stakes =

Defunct American Thoroughbred horse race

- Class: Discontinued stakes
- Location: Sheepshead Bay Race Track; Sheepshead Bay, Brooklyn, New York
- Inaugurated: 1887–1907
- Race type: Thoroughbred – Flat racing

Race information
- Distance: 1 3/16 miles (9.5 furlongs)
- Surface: Dirt
- Track: left-handed
- Qualification: Three-years-old

The Reapers Stakes was an American Thoroughbred horse race run annually at Sheepshead Bay Race Track in Sheepshead Bay, Brooklyn. Held in September, the race was open to three-year-olds of either sex. It was run on dirt over a distance of 1 3/16 miles except for 1903 when it was set at 1 3/8 miles.

On June 19, 1880 the Sheepshead Bay facility hosted its first day of Thoroughbred racing. Success made the addition of more stakes races possible and in 1887 the Reapers Stakes had its inaugural running. That race was won by Belvidere, a colt owned by the Preakness Stables of James Galway, a successful wholesaler of grocery store products and a Steward of The Jockey Club. The final running took place in 1907 and was won by the 20:1 outsider, Blue Book.

== Demise of the Reapers Stakes ==
After years of uncertainty, on June 11, 1908 the Republican controlled New York Legislature under Governor Charles Evans Hughes passed the Hart–Agnew anti-betting legislation with penalties allowing for fines and up to a year in prison. The owners of Sheepshead Bay Race Track, and other racing facilities in New York State, struggled to stay in business without income from betting. Racetrack operators had no choice but to drastically reduce the purse money being paid out which resulted in the Reapers Stakes being dropped from the 1908 schedule to enable a redistribution of funds to the most high-profile races. Further restrictive legislation was passed by the New York Legislature in 1910 which deepened the financial crisis for track operators and led to a complete shut down of racing across the state during 1911 and 1912. When a Court ruling saw racing return in 1913 it was too late for the Sheepshead Bay horse racing facility and it never reopened.

== Records ==
Speed record: (new track record)

- 1:59.40 – Heno (1902)

Most wins by a jockey:

- 3 – Fred Taral (1891, 1896, 1898)

Most wins by a trainer:

- 2 – John W. Rogers (1889, 1894)
- 2 – Charles Littlefield Sr. (1898, 1901)

Most wins by an owner:

- 2 – Preakness Stables (1887, 1897)
- 2 – Rancocas Stable (1892, 1900)
- 2 – Charles Littlefield Sr. (1898, 1901)

== Winners ==
Year	Winner	Age	Jockey	Trainer	Owner	Dist. (Miles)	Time	Win$
1907	Blue Book	3	R. Lowe	Stephen J. Lawler	James F. Carroll	13/16 M	2:05.00	$3,375
1906	Entrée	3	Herman Radtke	Thomas H. McCreery	Frederick A. Johnson	13/16 M	2:00.60	$3,475
1905	Coy Maid	3	Willie Knapp	John I. Smith	Kenilworth Stable (Frederick C. McLewee)	13/16 M	2:01.60	$3,275
1904	Aurumaster	3	William Crimmins	Matthew Feakes	H. J. Morris	13/16 M	2:00.00	$3,025
1903	Eugenia Burch	3	Grover Fuller	William C. Smith	Libby Curtis	13/8 M	2:20.80	$2,100
1902	Heno	3	Harry Michaels	William Lakeland Sr.	William S. Fanshawe	13/16 M	1:59.40	$2,300
1901	Watercolor	3	Henry Spencer	Charles Littlefield Sr.	Charles Littlefield Sr.	13/16 M	1:59.80	$1,720
1900	David Garrick	3	John Bullman	A. Jack Joyner	Rancocas Stable	13/16 M	2:00.40	$1,580
1899	Kinley Mack	3	Patrick McCue	Peter Wimmer	Augustus Eastin & Samuel E. Larabie	13/16 M	2:02.40	$1,280
1898	Latson	3	Fred Taral	Charles Littlefield Sr.	Charles Littlefield Sr.	13/16 M	2:04.00	$1,070
1897	Imperator	3	Charles A. Thorpe	Edward Feakes	Preakness Stables	13/16 M	2:03.20	$1,450
1896	Peep o'Day	3	Fred Taral	James H. McCormick	James H. McCormick	13/16 M	2:06.60	$1,400
1895	Flying Dutchman	3	Jerry Chorn	Patrick Dunne	Patrick Dunne	13/16 M	2:02.00	$1,400
1894	Dorian	3	Willie Simms	John W. Rogers	John W. Rogers	13/16 M	2:01.40	$1,480
1893	Sir Francis	3	Edward Garrison	Matthew Byrnes	Marcus Daly	13/16 M	2:02.00	$1,215
1892	Kilkenny	3	Anthony Hamilton	John Huggins	Rancocas Stable	13/16 M	2:03.20	$1,605
1891	La Tosca	3	Fred Taral	Frank M. Bray	Schuylkill Stable (Hough Brothers)	13/16 M	2:03.00	$1,545
1890	Ruperta	3	Alonzo Allen		B. J. Johnson	13/16 M	2:02.40	$1,425
1889	Buddhist	3	Marty Bergen	John W. Rogers	Samuel S. Brown	13/16 M	2:08.40	$1,720
1888	My Own	3	Rifleshine	R. Wyndham Walden	R. Wyndham Walden	13/16 M	2:04.20	$1,600
1887	Belvidere	3	Jim McLaughlin		Preakness Stables	13/16 M	2:03.00	$1,340
