= Dolphin Stakes =

- Class: Discontinued stakes
- Location: Sheepshead Bay Race Track, Sheepshead Bay, Brooklyn, New York, United States
- Inaugurated: 1887
- Race type: Thoroughbred – Flat racing

Race information
- Distance: 1 1/8 miles (9 furlongs)
- Surface: Dirt
- Track: left-handed
- Qualification: Three years old

The Dolphin Stakes was an American Thoroughbred horse race run between 1887 and 1909 at Sheepshead Bay Race Track in Sheepshead Bay, Brooklyn, New York. Open to three-year-old horses, it was raced over a distance of 1 1/8 miles on dirt.

== Historical notes ==
The inaugural edition of the Dolphin Stakes was won by Kingston who would finish his racing career with 89 wins, the most in the history of Thoroughbred racing. Kingston, his jockey, and his trainer all would have careers that led to induction in America's Racing Hall of Fame.

In 1894 Henry of Navarre was another future Hall of Fame inductee that won the Dolphin Stakes. He came into the event having already won that year's Travers and Belmont Stakes.

Beldame, a third Dolphin Stakes winner that would be inducted in the Hall of Fame, won the 1904 running. For that year she would be named American Horse of the Year.

The final edition of the Dolphin Stakes was won by Gliding Belle, a filly owned by William F. Schulte who had been an owner of Churchill Downs and served as president and CEO from 1895 to 1901. Schulte was responsible for adding the now iconic twin spires to the Churchill Downs grandstand.

== The End of a Race and of a Racetrack ==
The 1908 passage of the Hart–Agnew anti-betting legislation by the New York Legislature under Republican Governor Charles Evans Hughes created havoc in the state's racing industry and would lead to a complete shutdown of racing in 1911 and 1912. The owners of Sheepshead Bay Race Track, and other racing facilities in New York State, struggled to stay in business without income from betting. Racetrack operators had no choice but to eliminate certain races and drastically reduce the purse money being paid out which resulted in the Dolphin Stakes not being run in 1908. Brought back in 1909 with a purse reduced to less than one-eighth of what it had been in earlier years. These small purses made horse racing unprofitable and impossible for even the most successful horse owners to continue in business. A February 21, 1913 ruling by the New York Supreme Court, Appellate Division saw horse racing return in 1913. However, it was too late for the Sheepshead Bay horse racing facility and it never reopened.

== Records ==
Speed record:

- 1:53 flat @ 1 1/8 miles: Nealon (1906)

Most wins by a jockey:

- 2 – Jim McLaughlin (1998, 1888)
- 2 – Fred Taral (1891, 1893)
- 2 – Frank O'Neill (1904, 1905)

Most wins by a trainer:

- 2 – William Lakeland (1893, 1895, 1896)

Most wins by an owner:

- 2 – Byron McClelland (1892, 1894)
- 2 – James R. Keene (1893, 1895)

== Winners ==
Year	Winner	Age	Jockey	Trainer	Owner	Dist. (Miles)	Time	Win$
1909	Gliding Belle	3	Eddie Martin	Richard P. Brooks	William F. Schulte	11/8	1:58.40	$465
1908	Race not held							
1907	Montfort	3	Clifford D. Gilbert	Thomas J. Healey	Montpelier Stable	11/8	1:57.00	$3,350
1906	Nealon	3	Willie Dugan	Herman R. Brandt	Barney Schreiber	11/8	1:53.00	$3,475
1905	Water Light	3	Frank O'Neill	Matthew M. Allen	Diamond Jim Brady	11/8	1:55.00	$3,275
1904	Beldame	3	Frank O'Neill	Fred Burlew	Newton Bennington (Lessee)	11/8	1:53.00	$3,025
1903	Eugenia Burch	3	Grover Fuller	Jim McLaughlin	Libby Curtis	11/8	1:56.40	$2,250
1902	Igniter	3	Willie Shaw	Julius Bauer	Arthur Featherstone	11/8	1:53.40	$2,375
1901	Watercolor	3	Henry Spencer	Charles Littlefield Jr.	James B. A. Haggin	11/8	1:53.40	$1,710
1900	Lady Massey	3	John Slack	John E. Madden	John E. Madden	11/8	1:54.80	$1,690
1899	McLeod of Dare	3	Patrick A. McCue	Peter Wimmer	Augustus Eastin & Samuel E. Larabie	11/8	1:57.00	$1,380
1898	Floronso	3	Richard Clawson	Green B. Morris	Green B. Morris	11/8	1:54.80	$1,350
1897	Bernardillo	3	Skeets Martin	Albert Cooper	Elias J. "Lucky" Baldwin	11/8	1:56.80	$1,450
1896	Goldcrest	3	Anthony Hamilton	William Lakeland	William Lakeland	11/8	1:57.00	$1,400
1895	Emma C.	3	Samuel Doggett	William Lakeland	James R. Keene	11/8	1:56.40	$1,400
1894	Henry of Navarre	3	Alonzo Clayton	Byron McClelland	Byron McClelland	11/8	1:53.80	$1,530
1893	St. Leonards	3	Fred Taral	William Lakeland	James R. Keene	11/8	1:57.00	$1,300
1892	Leonawell	3	Edward Garrison	Byron McClelland	Byron McClelland	11/8	1:57.40	$1,560
1891	La Tosca	3	Fred Taral	Frank M. Bray	Hough Brothers	11/8	1:55.80	$1,330
1890	Ruperta	3	Alonzo Allen		B. J. Johnson	11/8	1:55.20	$1,525
1889	Buddhist	3	Marty Bergen	John W. Rogers	Samuel S. Brown	11/8	1:56.20	$1,885
1888	Judge Murray	3	Jim McLaughlin		George H. Kernaghan	11/8	1:55.80	$1,615
1887	Kingston	3	Jim McLaughlin	Frank McCabe	Dwyer Brothers Stable	11/8	1:55.50	$1,440
