= Tristan (horse) =

British-bred Thoroughbred racehorse

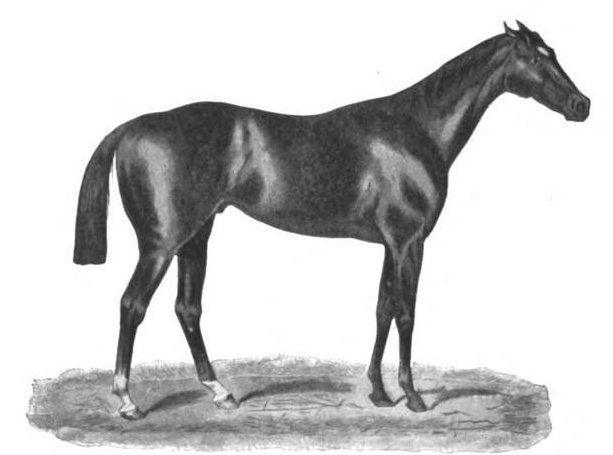
- Tristan in a drawing by John C. Nimmo
- Sire: Hermit
- Grandsire: Newminster
- Dam: Thrift
- Damsire: Stockwell
- Sex: Stallion
- Foaled: 1878
- Country: United Kingdom
- Colour: Brown
- Breeder: Robert St Clair-Erskine, 4th Earl of Rosslyn
- Owner: C. J. Lefevre
- Trainer: Thomas Jennings
- Record: 51:27-10-6
- Earnings: £25,000

Major wins
- Epsom Gold Cup (1882, 1883); Gold Vase (1882); Hardwicke Stakes (1882, 1883, 1884); July Cup (1882); Grand Prix de Deauville (1882, 1883, 1884); Champion Stakes (1882, 1883, 1884); Ascot Gold Cup (1883)

Tristan (1878–1897) was a British Thoroughbred racehorse and sire. In a career that lasted from the April 1880 to October 1884, he ran 51 times and won 27 races. A useful performer at two and three years old, he matured into an outstanding horse in his last three seasons, winning important races at distances ranging from six furlongs (the July Cup) to two and a half miles (Ascot Gold Cup) and defeating three winners of The Derby. Unusually for a 19th-century racehorse, he was regularly campaigned internationally, winning three consecutive runnings of the Grand Prix de Deauville. Tristan's success was achieved despite a dangerous and unpredictable temperament: at the height of his success, he was described as "a very vile-tempered animal".

== Background ==
Tristan was a dark chestnut horse standing just under 16 hands (64 inches, 163 cm) high, bred by Robert St Clair-Erskine, 4th Earl of Rosslyn at the Easton Stud near Great Dunmow in Essex. As a yearling, Tristan was bought by the French owner C. J. Lefevre, who sent the colt to be trained by Tom Jennings at the Phantom House stable at Newmarket, Suffolk. Jennings would later say that Tristan had been mistreated as a yearling before his arrival at Newmarket and this explained his well-known temperament problems. Tristan was ridden in most of his races by George Fordham and came to show a strong and sometimes violent dislike for other jockeys.

Tristan's sire Hermit won The Derby in 1867 and became an outstandingly successful stallion, being Champion Sire for seven successive years. In addition to Tristan, he sired the Derby winners Shotover and St. Blaise, as well as St. Marguerite (1000 Guineas), Lonely (Oaks), and Thebais (1000 Guineas & Oaks). Tristan's dam Thrift was an influential broodmare whose direct descendants included the Australian champion Poseidon, the Kentucky Derby winner George Smith and The Derby winner Reference Point.

== Racing career ==
=== 1880: two-year-old season ===
Tristan ran nine times in the first half of 1880, winning four races worth about £1,900. beginning his career with a second place in the Lincoln Cup at Lincoln Racecourse. At Epsom in April he won the Westminster Stakes and then finished second of fifteen runners to the filly Angelina in the Hyde Park Plate. On 11 May he won the Breeders' Plate over five furlongs at York reversing the Epsom form by beating Angelina "cleverly". At the end of the month Tristan returned to Epsom for the Derby meeting and won the Stanley Stakes, in which his three opponents included the future Grand National winner Voluptuary. At Royal Ascot he finished third to Sir Charles in the New Stakes, the race now known as the Norfolk Stakes. After running on unusually hard ground at Newmarket in July, when he finished unplaced behind Iroquois in the Chesterfield Stakes, he developed leg problems and missed the rest of the season.

=== 1881: three-year-old season ===
At the start of May Tristan finished unplaced behind Peregrine in the 2000 Guineas and two weeks later he ran third in the Payne Stakes. In the Derby he ran prominently for much of the way and turned into the straight in second place before weakening in the closing stages and finishing seventh behind Iroquois.

On 12 June he was again tested in the highest class when he was sent to run in the Grand Prix de Paris at Longchamp where he was ridden by Fred Archer. Tristan was beaten a head after a "superb race" with the American colt Foxhall, ridden by George Fordham. The French crowd treated the defeat of Tristan as a home victory and joined the sizable American contingent in the celebrations which were described as “the wildest ever seen at Longchamp”. It was only after the intervention of the local police force that Fordham and Archer were able to return to the weighing room. He won a race called the Prix de Deauville (not to be confused with the Grand Prix de Deauville) before returning to England. In July he won the six furlong Horseheath Stakes at Newmarket "in a canter" at odds of 2/5 and the Singleton Stakes at Goodwood. In August he traveled back to France for his first attempt at the Grand Prix de Deauville and finished third to Castillon. On his return to Britain he finished last of three runners in the Great Yorkshire Stakes over one and three quarter miles at York.

In September he was sent to Doncaster where he won a Queen's Plate before finishing second to Petronel in the Doncaster Cup. At Newmarket in October, Tristan ran third to the two-year-old filly Nellie in the Great Challenge Stakes and was beaten twice more by Foxhall when finishing second to the American colt in the Select Stakes and third in the Cambridgeshire Handicap. In the latter event, Tristan was beaten a head and a neck after being badly hampered in the closing stages.

=== 1882: four-year-old season ===
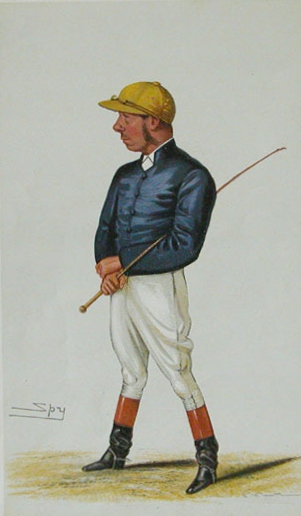
George Fordham: Tristan's regular jockey

As a four-year-old in 1882, Tristan showed much improved form and established himself as one of the leading racehorses in Europe by winning ten times in fourteen starts. He began the year by winning a Queen's Plate at Newmarket in April and followed up by winning His Majesty's Plate at Chester in May. At Epsom Downs Racecourse he ran twice at the Derby meeting. In the Epsom Stakes, a handicap race over one and a half miles, Tristan carried top weight of 124 pounds and won by a length and a half from Retreat He then added the Epsom Gold Cup, the race which was the forerunner of the Coronation Cup, in which he successfully conceded twenty-seven pounds to a filly named Isabel.

At Royal Ascot in June he ran three times and was unbeaten, showing versatility by winning over three different distances. He took the two mile Gold Vase, beating the previous year's winner Chippendale by six lengths, the one mile New Biennial Stakes and the one and a half mile Hardwicke Stakes. His performances established him as "one of the best horses in training". In July he moved down to sprint distances for the July Cup over six furlongs at Newmarket. Conceding at least twelve pounds to his opponents, Tristan won his eighth successive race by taking the lead at half way and winning easily from the two-year-old Royal Stag with Nellie third. In the Goodwood Cup on 27 July Tristan started at odds of 1/4 against two moderate opponents, but his winning streak came to an end after his jockey, George Fordham, misjudged the race tactics and allowed a horse named Friday to build up a huge lead which he was unable to make up in the straight. In August he was sent to France again and won the Grand Prix de Deauville from ten opponents.

On 12 October he contested the Champion Stakes over ten furlongs at Newmarket. He ran a dead heat with the filly Thebais, winner of the 1881 1000 Guineas and Oaks, with the St Leger winner Dutch Oven in third. Later in the meeting he finished second to the two-year-old Energy in the Great Challenge Stakes. At the end of October, Tristan ran twice at the Newmarket Houghton meeting without reproducing his best form. In the Cambridgeshire Handicap he carried top weight of 130 pounds and finished seventh of the thirty-one runners behind Hackness. On his final start of the year he ran in the Jockey Club Stakes over two and a quarter miles. In a closely contested four way finish he dead-heated for second place with City Arab, a short head behind Chippendale and a neck in front of the mare Corrie Roy.

=== 1883: five-year-old season ===
In April 1883 Tristan won a Queen's Plate at Epsom and then collected a second Epsom Gold Cup at the Derby meeting on 25 May, winning by three lengths from a field which included the Derby winner Shotover. Between these races he was beaten when attempting to concede three pounds to the unbeaten Irish horse Barcaldine in the Westminster Cup at Kempton. On this occasion he reportedly showed "a good deal of temper" before the race and ran "unkindly".

On 7 June at Royal Ascot he contested the Ascot Gold Cup, the year's most important staying race. Fordham sent him into the lead a mile from the finish and he won easily by three lengths from Dutch Oven and Wallenstein. On the last day of the Royal meeting he took the lead on the turn into the straight and won by a length and a half from Iroquois and eight others under top weight of 138 pounds to take his second Hardwicke Stakes. His winning time of 2:37 was considered exceptionally fast for the date. By this time he was being described as "about the best horse of the day in England", and "the present champion of the English turf", although he was also called "a bad horse to ride". An example of Tristan's problematic behaviour came on Newmarket Heath that summer when he attacked a horse named Gratin, who was acting as his training companion. Gratin was left lame whilst his rider, whom Tristan also attempted to savage, escaped with a black eye. Another of Tristan's "victims" was a stable boy, whom he reportedly "shook like a rat". His poor behaviour was blamed for contributing to his two defeats at Newmarket in July.

He returned to Deauville in August to win the Grand Prix again, this time carrying 151 pounds. At Newmarket on 11 October he recorded a repeat victory in the Champion Stakes again, this time taking the race outright from the St Leger winners Ossian and Dutch Oven. For the third successive year he was beaten by a two-year-old in the Great Challenge Stakes, finishing third to the future 1000 Guineas winner Busybody.

Tristan's winning prize money for the year totaled £7,628, a record for a five-year-old which enabled Lefevre win the owner's championship. Tristan's career earnings had reached £19,614 by the end of 1883.

=== 1884: six-year-old season ===
Tristan remained in training in 1884 by which time his achievements had made his name a "household word". At Newmarket in spring he ran a public trial against St. Simon a three-year-old colt who was prevented from running in the classics because the death of his owner had invalidated his entries. Tristan attempted to give the younger horse twenty-three pounds and was easily beaten. The two horses met again at Royal Ascot on 10 June when Tristan attempted to defend his status as the country's best stayer in the Ascot Gold Cup. His temperament came to the fore as he proved difficult to get to the start and when the race began he again proved no match for St. Simon who won by twenty lengths. In his other races at the meeting, Tristan took on St. Gatien and Harvester the colts who had dead-heated in the Epsom Derby. In the two mile Gold Vase he finished third to St Gatien and Corrie Roy, but in the Hardwicke Stakes on the last day of the meeting he won easily from Waterford, with the favourite Harvester a distant third.

On 17 August Tristan carried 151 pounds to a third successive victory in the Grand Prix de Deauville. Once again he showed a good deal of temperament before the start but won the race by a short head from Fra Diavolo. In autumn he returned to England to end his racing career at Newmarket. Running in the Champion Stakes for the third time on 9 October he delayed the start for a quarter of an hour by his "display of temper" before dead-heating with the four-year-old Lucerne. He was then retired to stud "covered with honours" and regarded as "one of the most wonderful horses of the time".

== Stud career ==
Lefevre retired Tristan to stand as a stallion in France at his stud near Chamant. In 1891 he was purchased by Caroline, Duchess of Montrose, who returned him to England as a replacement for the recently deceased Isonomy. Three years later he was sold again and exported to Austria-Hungary. In 1897 he died as a result of injuries sustained after dashing his head against the wall of his stable in a fit of temper. Tristan was not a great success as a stallion, but he did sire Canterbury Pilgrim, who won The Oaks in 1896 and became a highly successful and influential broodmare. Other good winners included Le Nord (Dewhurst Stakes) and Le Nicham (Champion Stakes).

== Pedigree ==
Pedigree of Tristan (GB), chestnut stallion, 1878
Sire Hermit (GB) 1864	Newminster; 1848	Touchstone	Camel
Sire Hermit (GB) 1864	Newminster; 1848	Touchstone	Banter
Sire Hermit (GB) 1864	Newminster; 1848	Beeswing	Doctor Syntax
Sire Hermit (GB) 1864	Newminster; 1848	Beeswing	Ardrossan mare
Sire Hermit (GB) 1864	Seclusion; 1857	Tadmor	Ion
Sire Hermit (GB) 1864	Seclusion; 1857	Tadmor	Palmyra
Sire Hermit (GB) 1864	Seclusion; 1857	Miss Sellon	Cowl
Sire Hermit (GB) 1864	Seclusion; 1857	Miss Sellon	Belle Dame
Dam Thrift (GB) 1865	Stockwell; 1849	The Baron	Birdcatcher
Dam Thrift (GB) 1865	Stockwell; 1849	The Baron	Echidna
Dam Thrift (GB) 1865	Stockwell; 1849	Pocahontas	Glencoe
Dam Thrift (GB) 1865	Stockwell; 1849	Pocahontas	Marpessa
Dam Thrift (GB) 1865	Braxey; 1849	Moss Trooper	Liverpool
Dam Thrift (GB) 1865	Braxey; 1849	Moss Trooper	Bassinoire
Dam Thrift (GB) 1865	Braxey; 1849	Queen Mary	Gladiator
Dam Thrift (GB) 1865	Braxey; 1849	Queen Mary	Plenipotentiary mare (Family: 10-d)
