= Fred Taral =

American jockey (1867–1925)

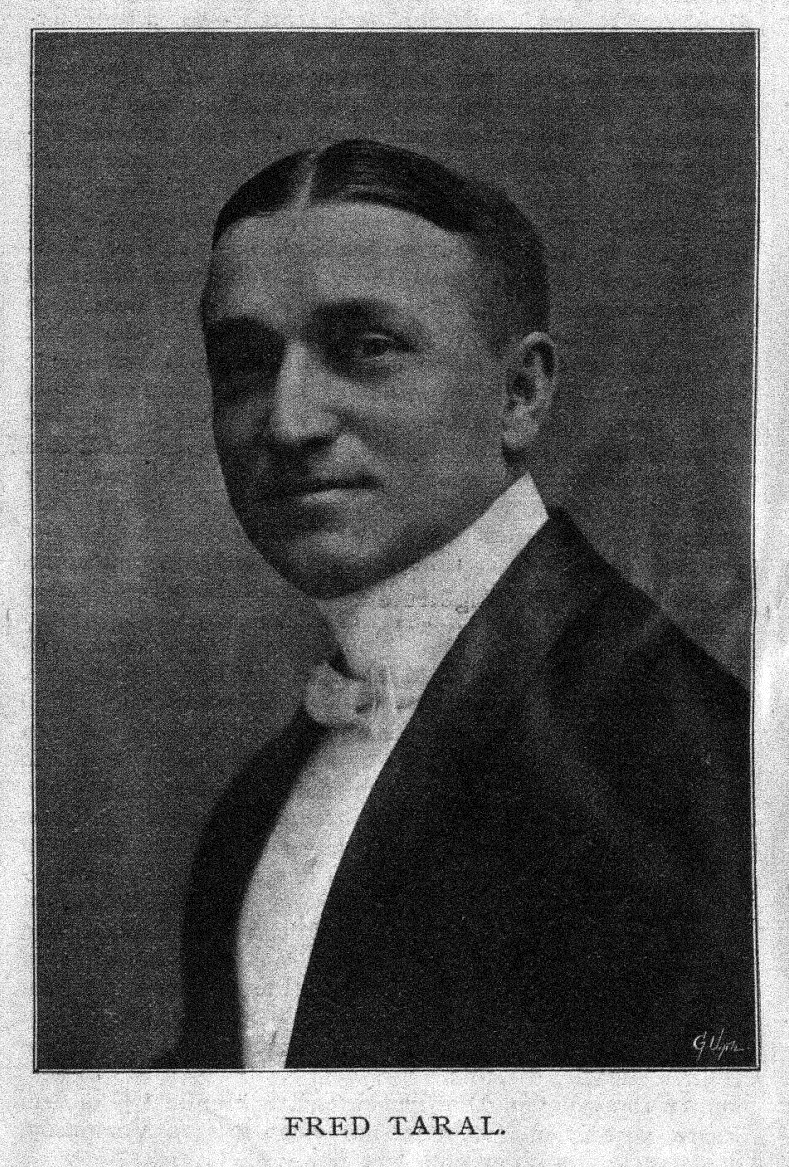
- Fred Taral around 1903

Personal information
- Born: August 2, 1867 Peoria, Illinois, United States
- Died: February 13, 1925 (aged 57) Jamaica, New York, US
- Occupations: Jockey & trainer

Horse racing career
- Sport: Horse racing
- Career wins: 1,437

Major racing wins
- United States wins: September Stakes (1890); Dolphin Stakes (1891, 1893); Double Event Stakes (part 2) (1891, 1892, 1899); June Stakes (1891, 1892, 1896, 1899); Juvenile Stakes (1891); Ladies Handicap (1891, 1897); Reapers Stakes (1891, 1896, 1898); Sapphire Stakes (1891); Spring Stakes (1891, 1896, 1897); Flight Stakes (1892, 1896); Great Eclipse Stakes (1892, 1893); Hudson Stakes (1892, 1896); Metropolitan Handicap (1892, 1894); Spindrift Stakes (1892, 1897); Surf Stakes (1892); Zephyr Stakes (1892); Autumn Stakes (1893, 1895, 1897); Belmont Futurity Stakes (1893); Champagne Stakes (1893, 1894); Double Event Stakes (part 1) (1893); Fashion Stakes (1893, 1899); First Special Stakes (1893); Great American Stakes (1893, 1896); Matron Stakes (1893, 1894); Withers Stakes (1893, 1894); Brooklyn Handicap (1893, 1894, 1896); Flying Handicap (1894, 1895); Suburban Handicap (1894); Travers Stakes (1894, 1897); Russet Stakes (1895); Twin City Handicap (1895, 1897); Autumn Maiden Stakes (1896); Daisy Stakes (1896, 1897); Gazelle Handicap (1896); Great Eastern Handicap (1896, 1897); Vernal Stakes (1897); Rancho Del Paso Stakes (1898) European race wins: Austria-Hungary Königspreis (1908); Deutsches Derby (1909); Preis des Winterfavoriten (1912, 1913) American Classics wins: Kentucky Derby (1899); Preakness Stakes (1894, 1895); Belmont Stakes (1895) As a trainer: Juvenile Stakes (1923)

Honours
- United States Racing Hall of Fame (1955)

Significant horses
- Domino, Assignee, Henry of Navarre; Diablo, Belmar, Manuel
- Updated on March 23, 2007

Frederick J. Taral (August 2, 1867 – February 13, 1925) was an American Hall of Fame jockey.

== Jockey career ==
Taral began his career in racing in the 1880s at small racetracks in Oklahoma.

In 1883, he rode his first competitive thoroughbred in a race at Washington Park.

By 1889, he was among the 24-member jockey colony at the Fair Grounds Race Course in New Orleans and competed in his first Kentucky Derby.

According to The Boston Post, he was the highest-earning jockey in the US in 1894, with an estimated combined payout of US$20,000. Reports published at the time suggested he had even completed one season with a broken arm.

New York State's passage of the Hart–Agnew anti-betting law in 1908 resulted in racetracks statewide struggling to stay in business. As a result, many stable owners, trainers, and jockeys began leaving to work in Europe. Taral left racing in the United States and when riding in Austria-Hungary, he won the 1908 Königspreis (King's Prize), the most important race in that country. He also rode and trained in Germany, where he rode Macdonald to victory in the 1909 Deutsches Derby. He returned home following the outbreak of World War I.

For owner James R. Keene, Taral rode future Hall of Famers Domino and Henry of Navarre. He also rode Domino against Henry of Navarre to a dead heat in an 1894 match race. On different horses, that year Taral won the New York Handicap Triple, capturing the Brooklyn Handicap, Metropolitan Handicap, and Suburban Handicap. In all, he won the Brooklyn Handicap on three occasions and the Metropolitan Handicap twice. He was also a two-time winner of the Travers, Champagne, and Withers Stakes.

In the pre-Triple Crown era, Taras had back-to-back wins in the Preakness Stakes. He first won it in 1894 aboard Assignee and in 1895 won his second Preakness plus the Belmont Stakes with the colt Belmar. In 1899, he won the Kentucky Derby aboard Manuel.

== Training career ==
Following his retirement from riding in 1908, Taral pursued a career as a trainer. Among his clients was the Riviera Stable owned by Victor Vivaudou for whom he trained notable runners Fabian and Miss Star.

Tarsal died of pneumonia in 1925. He was buried in the Maple Grove Cemetery in Kew Gardens, New York. In 1955, he was part of the inaugural class inducted into the newly created United States Racing Hall of Fame.
