= Spindrift Stakes =

- Class: Discontinued stakes
- Location: Sheepshead Bay Race Track; Sheepshead Bay, Brooklyn, New York, United States
- Inaugurated: 1885
- Race type: Thoroughbred – Flat racing

Race information
- Distance: 1 1/8 miles (9.0 furlongs; 1.8 km)
- Surface: Dirt
- Track: Left-handed
- Qualification: Three-year-olds
- Weight: Assigned

The Spindrift Stakes was an American Thoroughbred horse race run annually between 1885 and 1909 at Sheepshead Bay Race Track at Sheepshead Bay, Brooklyn, New York City. A race for three-year-olds, it was contested on dirt over a distance of 1 1/4 miles (10 furlongs; 2.0 km) from 1885 to 1892 and at 1 1/8 miles (9.0 furlongs; 1.8 km) from 1893 through 1909.

The inaugural running took place on July 11, 1885, and was won by St. Augustine, a John Alcock trained colt owned by George Lorillard. The final running of the Spindrift took place on July 7, 1909, and was won by the Oneck Stable's Fashion Plate, trained by William Karrick.

== The 1911–1912 statewide shutdown of horse racing ==
On June 11, 1908, the Republican controlled New York Legislature under Governor Charles Evans Hughes passed the Hart–Agnew anti-betting legislation. The owners of Sheepshead Bay Race Track, and other racing facilities in New York State, struggled to stay in business without income from betting. Racetrack operators had no choice but to drastically reduce the purse money being paid out which resulted in the Spindrift Stakes offering a purse in 1909 that was nearly one-tenth of what it had been in earlier years. These small purses made horse racing unprofitable and impossible for even the most successful horse owners to continue in business. As such, for the 1910 racing season management of the Sheepshead Bay facility dropped some of its minor stakes races and used the purse money to bolster its most important events.

In spite of strong opposition by prominent owners such as August Belmont Jr. and Harry Payne Whitney, reform legislators were not happy when they learned that betting was still going on at racetracks between individuals and they had further restrictive legislation passed by the New York Legislature in 1910. The Agnew–Perkins Law, a series of four bills and recorded as the Executive Liability Act, made it possible for racetrack owners and members of its board of directors to be fined and imprisoned if anyone was found betting, even privately, anywhere on their premises. After a 1911 amendment to the law that would limit the liability of owners and directors was defeated in the Legislature, every racetrack in New York State shut down. As a result, after 1909 the Spindrift Stakes was never run again.

Owners, whose horses of racing age had nowhere to go, began sending them, their trainers and their jockeys to race in England and France. Many horses ended their racing careers there and a number remained to become an important part of the European horse breeding industry. Thoroughbred Times reported that more than 1,500 American horses were sent overseas between 1908 and 1913 and of them at least 24 were either past, present, or future Champions. When a February 21, 1913 ruling by the New York Supreme Court, Appellate Division Court saw horse racing return in 1913. However, it was too late for the Sheepshead Bay horse racing facility and it never reopened.

== Records ==
Speed record:

- 1:51.80 – Fashion Plate (1909) at 1 1/8 miles (9.0 furlongs; 1.8 km)
- 2:09.40 – Sir John (1890) at 1 1/4 miles (10 furlongs; 2.0 km)

Most wins by a jockey:

- 2 – Henry Spencer (1899, 1900)

Most wins by a trainer:

- 4 – James G. Rowe Sr. (1888, 1903, 1906, 1907)

Most wins by an owner:

- 2 – Dwyer Brothers Stable (1887, 1890)
- 2 – Samuel S. Brown & John W. Rogers (1892, 1893)
- 2 – James R. Keene (1906, 1907)

== Winners ==
Year	Winner	Age	Jockey	Trainer	Owner	Dist. (Miles)	Time	Win$
1909	Fashion Plate	3	Henry Smith	William H. Karrick	Oneck Stable	11/8	1:51.80	$495
1908	Firestone	3	Walter Miller	Dr. H. E. Rowell	Thomas H. Williams	11/8	1:53.20	$3,890
1907	Cabochon	3	Mr. Lowe	James G. Rowe Sr.	James R. Keene	11/8	1:53.40	$4,410
1906	Kuroki	3	Willie Shaw	James G. Rowe Sr.	James R. Keene	11/8	1:53.80	$4,215
1905	Oiseau	3	Frank O'Neill	Matthew M. Allen	Diamond Jim Brady	11/8	1:53.60	$3,700
1904	Highball	3	George Odom	John W. May	Walter M. Scheftel	11/8	1:54.00	$4,215
1903	Injunction	3	Willie Gannon	James G. Rowe Sr.	Foxhall P. Keene	11/8	1:52.80	$3,270
1902	Ranald	3	Otto Wonderly	Charles S. Littlefield Jr.	James B. A. Haggin	11/8	1:54.20	$3,000
1901	Gold Heels	3	Winfield O'Connor	Matthew M. Allen	Diamond Jim Brady & Fred C. McLewee	11/8	1:52.40	$1,870
1900	Prince of Melbourne	3	Henry Spencer	J. A. Kyle	Col. Frank D. Beard	11/8	1:53.60	$2,150
1899	Ethelbert	3	Henry Spencer	A. Jack Joyner	Perry Belmont	11/8	1:55.40	$1,380
1898	Sailor King	3	Danny Maher	Walter B. Jennings	Walter B. Jennings	11/8	1:55.40	$1,490
1897	On Deck	3	Fred Taral	Julius Bauer	Bromley & Co. (Joseph E. Bromley & Arthur Featherstone)	11/8	1:56.40	$1,450
1896	Formal	3	Fred Littlefield	R. Wyndham Walden	Alfred & David Morris	11/8	1:56.00	$1,400
1895	Bright Phoebus	3	Lester Reiff	Charles S. Littlefield Jr.	Del Monte Stable	11/8	1:57.20	$1,450
1894	Henry of Navarre	3	Samuel Doggett	Byron McClelland	Byron McClelland	11/8	1:56.20	$1,950
1893	Glenmoyne	3	Willie Simms	John W. Rogers	Samuel S. Brown & John W. Rogers	11/8	1:54.80	$1,740
1892	Pickpocket	3	Fred Taral	John W. Rogers	Samuel S. Brown & John W. Rogers	11/4	2:11.40	$1,715
1891	Potomac	3	Anthony Hamilton	Hardy Campbell Jr.	Michael F. Dwyer	11/4	2:11.00	$1,975
1890	Sir John	3	Marty Bergen	Frank McCabe	Dwyer Brothers Stable	11/4	2:09.40	$1,860
1889	My Fellow	3	William Donohue	Charles S. Littlefield Sr.	Charles S. Littlefield Sr.	11/4	2:10.20	$2,200
1888	Raceland	3	P. Godfrey	James G. Rowe Sr.	August Belmont	11/4	2:12.00	$3,250
1887	Hanover	3	Jim McLaughlin	Frank McCabe	Dwyer Brothers Stable	11/4	2:11.25	$3,300
1886	The Bard	3	John Fisher	John Huggins	Mr. Kelso	11/4	2:09.25	$3,925
1885	St. Augustine	3	Harry Blaylock	John Alcock	George L. Lorillard	11/4	2:11.75	$4,625
