= Dash Stakes =

- Class: Discontinued stakes
- Location: Sheepshead Bay Race Track, Sheepshead Bay, Brooklyn, New York
- Inaugurated: 1887–1909
- Race type: Thoroughbred – Flat racing

Race information
- Distance: 5¾ furlongs
- Track: Dirt, left-handed
- Qualification: Two years old
- Purse: US$330

The Dash Stakes was an American Thoroughbred horse race first run in 1887 at Sheepshead Bay Race Track in Sheepshead Bay, Brooklyn, New York. A race for two-year-old horses of either sex, it was run on dirt over a distance of 5¾ furlongs.

An annual event, the Dash Stakes had its final running as an overnight purse on September 1, 1909 after the Republican controlled New York Legislature under Governor Charles Evans Hughes passed the Hart–Agnew anti-betting legislation on June 11, 1908 with penalties allowing for fines and up to a year in prison. The owners of Sheepshead Bay Race Track, and other racing facilities in New York State, struggled to stay in business without betting. Racetrack operators had no choice but to drastically reduce the purse money being paid out; by 1909 the Dash Stakes offered a purse that was as little as one twelfth of what it had been in earlier years. Further restrictive legislation was passed by the New York Legislature in 1910 which deepened the financial crisis for track operators and led to a complete shut down of racing across the state during 1911 and 1912. When a court ruling saw racing return in 1913 it was too late for the Sheepshead Bay facility and it never reopened.

== Records ==
Speed record:

- 5.75 furlongs: 1:11.80 – Miss Kearney (1908)
- 5 furlongs: 0:58.60 – Jacobite (1905)

Most wins by a jockey:

- 3 – Danny Maher (1897, 1898, 1900)

Most wins by a trainer: Ŧ

- 2 – A. Jack Joyner (1902, 1905)
- 2 – Byron McClelland (1893, 1898)

Most wins by an owner:

- 2 – Byron McClelland (1893, 1898)
- Ŧ based on 20 of the 23 years the race was run.

== Winners ==
Year	Winner	Age	Jockey	Trainer	Owner	Dist. (Miles)	Time	Win$
1909	Billiard Ball	2	Eddie Dugan	James Blute	E. H. Jennings	5.75 F	1:12.60	$330
1908	Miss Kearney	2	Cal Shilling	John E. Madden	John E. Madden	5.75 F	1:11.80	$1,050
1907	Lawrence P. Daly	2	Dave Nicol	William E. Phillips	Fred Cook	5 F	1:01.00	$2,900
1906	W. H. Daniel	2	Joseph A. Jones	Henry McDaniel	E. S. Burke Jr.	5 F	1:00.60	$3,350
1905	Jacobite	2	Willie Davis	A. Jack Joyner	Sydney Paget	5 F	0:58.60	$4,050
1904	Wild Mint	2	Tommy Burns	James G. Rowe Sr.	James R. Keene	5 F	1:00.00	$3,175
1903	Lady Amelia	2	Grover Fuller	Woodford Clay	Woodford Clay	5 F	1:00.00	$3,100
1902	Invincible	2	Lucien Lyne	A. Jack Joyner	Albemarle Stable	5 F	0:59.00	$3,120
1901	Heno	2	Tommy Burns	Charles F. Hill	Clarence Mackay	5 F	0:59.60	$2,540
1900	Bellario	2	Danny Maher	Fred Burlew	Newton Bennington	5 F	1:00.40	$2,370
1899	Mesmerist	2	Winfield O'Connor	Julius J. Bauer	Bromley & Co. (Joseph E. Bromley & Arthur Featherstone)	5 F	1:00.60	$2,190
1898	Ways and Means	2	Danny Maher	Byron McClelland	Byron McClelland	5 F	1:01.00	$1,850
1897	Alice Farley	2	Danny Maher	James O. Gray	James O. Gray	5 F	1:01.00	$1,430
1896	The Friar	2	Fred Littlefield	R. Wyndham Walden	A. H. & D. H. Morris	5 F	1:01.00	$1,425
1895	Crescendo	2	Felix Carr		Pueblo Stable (J. Naglee Burk)	5 F	1:02.00	$1,600
1894	Brandywine	2	Alonzo Clayton	John W. Rogers	Perry Belmont	5 F	1:01.60	$1,970
1893	Henry of Navarre	2	Clarence Bryant	Byron McClelland	Byron McClelland	5 F	1:01.40	$2,145
1892	Runyon	2	Joaquin Narvaez	Matthew M. Allen	Frank A. Ehret	5 F	1:02.60	$2,260
1891	Dashing Belle	2	Marty Bergen	Hardy Campbell Jr.	Michael F. Dwyer	5 F	1:03.00	$2,360
1890	Eclipse	2	W. Steppe		Sennett & Warn	5 F	1:02.40	$2,445
1889	Reclare	2	Daly	Henry Warnke Jr.	Henry Warnke & Son	5 F	1:02.00	$2,705
1888	Champagne Charley	2	Johnson	W. P. Maxwell	W. P. Maxwell	5 F	1:01.40	$2,060
1887	Van Leland	2	Reginald Harris	Phil Gillman	Dan Honig	5 F	1:02.00	$2,125
