= Hermit (horse) =

British-bred Thoroughbred racehorse

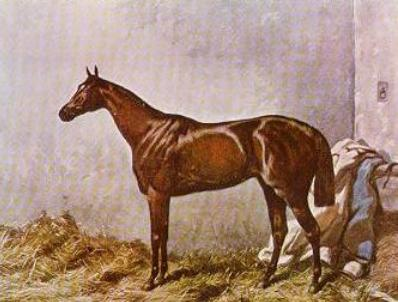
- Hermit as painted by Harry Hall (1870s).
- Sire: Newminster
- Grandsire: Touchstone
- Dam: Seclusion
- Damsire: Tadmor
- Sex: Stallion
- Foaled: 1864
- Died: 1890 (aged 25–26)
- Country: United Kingdom of Great Britain and Ireland
- Colour: Chestnut
- Breeder: William Blenkiron
- Owner: Henry Chaplin
- Trainer: George Bloss
- Record: 23: 8–9–0
- Earnings: £41,261

Major wins
- Epsom Derby (1867); St. James's Palace Stakes (1867)

Honours
- Leading sire in Great Britain & Ireland (1880–1886); Leading broodmare sire in Great Britain & Ireland (5 times)
- Last updated on 14 February 2011

Hermit (1864–1890), sometimes known, incorrectly as "The Hermit", was a 19th-century British Thoroughbred racehorse and sire. In a racing career which lasted from April 1866 until July 1869 he ran 23 times and won eight races. He was a leading two-year-old in 1866 and won the 1867 Epsom Derby, despite breaking down in training shortly before the race. He continued to race until the age of five, but never recovered his form after running three times in three days at Doncaster in September 1867. After his retirement he had a long and highly successful career at stud.

== Breeding ==
Hermit was a "yellowish" chestnut stallion standing about 15.2 hands (62 inches, 157 cm) high with a narrow white blaze. He was by the stallion Newminster who won the St Leger in 1851 before going on to a successful stud career in which his other notable winners included Musjid (Epsom Derby) and Lord Clifden (St Leger, Champion sire). Hermit's dam was Seclusion a winning daughter of Tadmor. Hermit's sire and dam were both bleeders and passed the condition on to Hermit. By contemporary accounts, Hermit was a good-natured horse with a gentle disposition.

He was bred by William Blenkiron at the Middle Park stud in Kent and offered for sale as a yearling at Eltham on 17 June 1865. He was bought for 1,000 guineas by Captain James Machell on behalf of Henry Chaplin. Machell acted as Chaplin's racing manager although the day-to-day training of the colt was handled by George Bloss.

== Racing career ==
=== 1866: two-year-old season ===
Hermit was given his first trial when still a yearling in December 1865. He conceded 35 pounds (16 kg) to a yearling filly named Problem and won their private race comfortably. When Problem won the valuable Brocklesby Stakes on her debut at Lincoln Racecourse in March, it was clear to Machell and Chaplin that they had a potentially top class colt.

Hermit began his racing career at the First Spring Meeting at Newmarket where he finished second in a half-mile sweepstakes to the filly Cellina, who was carrying three pounds more than the colt. Shortly afterwards he ran against Cellina again in a Biennial Stakes at Bath. Despite conceding three pounds to the filly, Hermit showed improved form to win by a neck from Cellina with the pair finishing three lengths clear of the other 12 runners. On his next appearance, Hermit was sent to Epsom for the Woodcote Stakes at the Derby meeting for which he started joint favourite with Colonel Pearson's filly Achievement. Hermit finished three lengths second to Achievement, who went on to win the 1000 Guineas and the St Leger in 1867. At Royal Ascot in June, Hermit won a Biennial Stakes for two-year-old colts by a neck from Dragon at odds of 4/1. Hermit was then sent to Stockbridge where he added two further wins. In the Stockbridge Biennial Stakes he started 8/11 favourite in a field of 16 runners and won by a neck from the Duke of Beaufort's colt Vauban. At the next Stockbridge meeting he won the Troy Stakes at odds of 2/5 from Lady Hester and Julius with Vauban unplaced.

By late summer Hermit had established himself as one of the best colts of his generation and a contender for the following year's classics. He did not appear again in 1866 after his wins at Stockbridge however, causing his quality and soundness to be questioned by some commentators.

=== 1867: three-year-old season ===
Hermit did not race in 1867 before the Derby, meaning that he had been off the course for more than 10 months when he appeared at Epsom. In spring the 2000 Guineas was won by Vauban, with Hermit's stable companion Knight of the Garter beaten two lengths in second and Marksman third. Vauban became a leading fancy for the Derby but Machell's confidence in Hermit was reinforced when he conceded ten pounds to Knight of the Garter and defeated him convincingly in a private trial race.

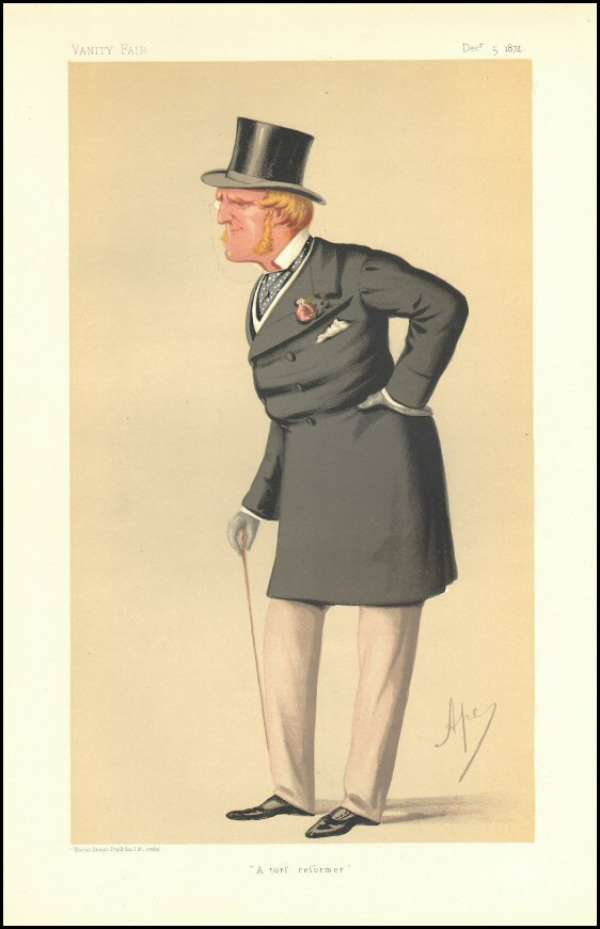
Henry Chaplin, as caricatured in Vanity Fair

A week before the Derby Hermit broke a blood vessel in an exercise gallop and had to be pulled up with blood pouring from his nostrils. He seemed unlikely to recover in time for the race and Machell released his jockey, Harry Custance to partner another runner named The Rake. When The Rake also had training problems and Hermit began to recover, Machell tried to claim Custance back, but The Rake's owner refused to co-operate and Johny Daley was booked to take the ride on Hermit. Thirty horses lined up for the race in front of a crowd which was much smaller than usual on account of the "Siberian" conditions. Although the race was sometimes recalled as having been run in a snowstorm (like Bloomsbury's Derby in 1839), accounts of eyewitnesses indicate that the snow and sleet abated early in the day leaving conditions dry, but bitterly cold. Hermit, who had been restricted to light cantering in the days before the race, started at odds of 1000/15 (approximately 66/1) and his appearance before the race seemed to justify his odds, as he was described as "a wreck" and "a corpse". The race was delayed by ten false starts, increasing the discomfort of both the competitors and spectators. When the race finally began, Vauban, the 11/8 favourite went to the front and held the lead into the straight. A furlong from the finish Marksman overtook the favourite and looked the likely winner, but Daley produced Hermit with a strong late run to catch Marksman in the last strides and win by a neck. There was some criticism of Marksman's jockey, Grimshaw, who was alleged to have relaxed too early after thinking that he had the race won. There was also dissatisfaction from those who had gambled on the more fancied runners, with some accusations that Hermit's problems had been either exaggerated or invented to obtain better odds. Baily's magazine published A Lay of Modern Epsom, by "Greathopes", a parody of Macaulay's Lays of Ancient Rome, which summed up Hermit's victory in the lines:

"Despis'd, abus'd forsaken,

Predicted not to "stay"

A byeword and a proverb

The Hermit won the day!"

Chaplin won well over £100,000 on the race and rewarded those associated with the win. Daley was given £1,000 and Bloss who had ensured Hermit's security by sleeping in the horse's stable for several weeks in the build-up to the race, was rewarded with £5,000. By contrast the result of the race brought Chaplin's sporting and personal rival Harry Hastings to the brink of financial ruin. Two days after his win in the Derby, Daley completed a double when Hippia defeated the 1/3 favourite Achievement to win The Oaks.

Hermit followed up his Derby win with two runs at Royal Ascot, where he reportedly looked much better than he had done at Epsom. In the Ascot Biennial Stakes over a mile he started 1/5 favourite and won comfortably by a length and a half from Dragon and Julius. At the same meeting he started at odds of 1/20 for the St. James's Palace Stakes over the same distance and won "in a canter" by three lengths. Hermit was then rested before being trained for the St Leger.

At Doncaster on 11 September, Hermit was one of 12 runners for the St Leger. He started the 6/5 favourite ahead of the filly Achievement, with Vauban and Julius the only other runners at less than 33/1. He finished second to Achievement, beaten by one length, with Julius a head away in third and Vauban fourth. According to contemporary reports, Hermit ran very gamely, but was unable to catch the long-striding filly in the straight. Chaplin later claimed that he had been unhappy with the colt's preparation, feeling that the training regime imposed by Bloss and Machell had been too severe. Two days later Hermit met Achievement again in the Doncaster Cup over two mile five furlongs and was beaten by three quarters of a length. On the same afternoon, Hermit ran a sweepstakes over one and three-quarter miles, in which he was ridden to victory by Custance against two opponents, both of whom were receiving seven pounds from the Derby winner.

On 24 September Hermit started 6/4 favourite for the Grand Duke Michael Stakes over ten furlongs at Newmarket and finished second by a length to Friponnier, to whom he was conceding seven pounds. Hermit and Friponnier met again at the next Newmarket meeting when they were the only two runners for a one-mile sweepstakes. On this occasion Hermit conceded five pounds to his opponent and was beaten ten lengths. On the following day Hermit finished second again when he failed by one and a half lengths to conceded 14 pounds to Longchamps in the Newmarket Derby.

=== 1868–69: later career ===
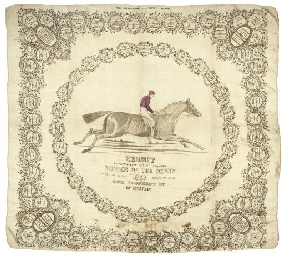
Hermit's Derby win commemorated in a souvenir handkerchief.

On 16 April at the Craven meeting at Newmarket, Hermit was narrowly beaten by the Cesarewitch winner Julius, to whom he was conceding seven pounds in a Biennial Stakes. At the next Newmarket meeting Hermit and Julius met in a match race over two miles with Hermit carrying one pound less than his opponent. Julius won comfortably by two lengths. At the same meeting, Henry Chaplin paid a forfeit when Hermit failed to appear for a ten furlong match in which he was set to concede thirteen pounds to The Palmer.

Having finished first or second in his first seventeen starts, Hermit's form deteriorated badly, and he was unplaced in all his subsequent races. In September, Hermit carried top weight and started 2/1 favourite for the Portland Plate at Doncaster but finished unplaced behind Lady Zetland. At Newmarket on 8 October he was unplaced again when carrying top weight in a one-mile handicap. In late October at the Houghton meeting Chaplin again paid a forfeit when Hermit did not take part in a scheduled match against The Palmer. On his final start of the year at the same meeting Hermit finished unplaced in the six furlong Houghton handicap.

As a five-year-old, Hermit returned to the Epsom Derby meeting on 27 May where he carried top weight of 130 pounds in Six Mile Hill Handicap over a mile and a half. He started at odds of 20/1 and finished unplaced behind Count Batthyany's horse Nine Elms. Two weeks later Hermit finished unplaced again in the Royal Hunt Cup over one mile at Royal Ascot. In July he was moved to sprint distances and finished unplaced yet again behind Fichu when carrying top weight in the six furlong Stewards' Cup at Goodwood.

== Stud record ==
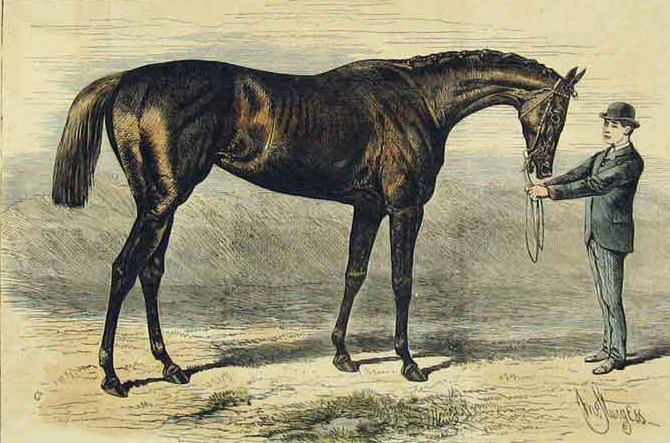
Shotover: the first of Hermit's two Derby winners

Hermit was an exceptional sire, with 846 English stakes winners, and was the leading English sire for seven years (1880–86). He was the Leading broodmare sire in Great Britain & Ireland five times.

His notable progeny includes:

Foaled	Name	Sex	Major Wins/Achievements
1871	Ascetic	Stallion	Leading sire of Irish steeple chasers for almost 20 years. Sired St Blaise (Epsom Derby (1883), Leading sire in North America (1890), sired Potomac).
1873	Moorhen	Mare	Dam of the champion sire Gallinule
1878	Thebais	Mare	1000 Guineas Stakes
1878	Tristan	Stallion	Ascot Gold Cup
1879	Shotover	Mare	2000 Guineas Stakes (1882), Epsom Derby (1882). 3rd dam of Frizette.
1879	St Marguerite	Mare	1000 Guineas Stakes. Granddam of Rock Sand.
1882	Lonely	Mare	Yorkshire Oaks
1885	Friar's Balsam	Stallion	Brilliant as a two-year-old, but plagued by mouth abscesses during and after the 2000 Guineas Stakes
1885	Bella-Donna	Mare	Dam of Beldame
1885	Zama	Mare	Dam of the champion sire Hannibal
1888	Cinderella	Mare	Dam of Peter Pan

Hermit died on 29 April 1890 at the age of 25 at his owner's Blankney Stud in Lincolnshire. His skeleton was preserved by the Royal College of Veterinary Surgeons while Chaplin had one of his hooves mounted and fashioned into an ink-stand which he presented to the Prince of Wales.

== Place of rest ==
His skeleton is now held at The Royal Veterinary College, Camden campus, part of the University of London. He is used in anatomy demonstrations for all years and courses.

== Sire line tree ==
- Hermit
  - Ascetic
    - St Andrew
    - Anchorite
    - Cenobite
    - Roman Oak
    - Royal Meath
      - Tipperary Boy
      - Midas
      - Rory O'Moore
      - Royal Bow
    - Cloister
    - Ulysses
    - Abbot
    - Aconite
    - Hermit
    - Koodoo
    - Sir Patrick
      - Patlander
    - Riverstown
      - Lord Rivers
    - Athletic
    - Drumcree
    - Hidden Mystery
    - Leinster
    - Uncle Jack
    - Orange Pat
    - Ascetic's Silver
  - Trappist
  - Ambergris
  - Gunnersbury
    - Uram Batyam
    - Galifard
  - Peter
    - Sweetheart
      - Sweet Cecil
    - Zsupan
    - Peterhof
      - Repeater
  - Retreat
    - Father O'Flynn
    - Skedaddle
  - St Louis
    - St Germaine
    - Le Hardy
      - Retz
  - Tristan
    - Le Nord
    - Le Nicham
  - Whipper-In
    - Malakoff
    - Revancha
  - Cassock
  - St Blaise
    - St Carlo
    - Potomac
    - Silver Fox
      - Sly Fox
    - St Florian
    - Margrave
      - Margraviate
    - St Bartholomew
  - Candlemas
    - Irish Lad
      - Blarney
        - Guido Reni
  - Gamin
    - Gospodar
  - Gay Hermit
    - Talma
    - Balcarce
    - Gonin
    - Valero
      - Mister Irving
    - Cordon Rouge
    - Celso
  - St Mirin
  - Timothy
  - Friar's Balsam
    - Balsamo
    - Voter
      - Ballot
        - Midway
        - Chilhowee
      - Electioneer
      - Hilarious
      - Runnymede
        - Morvich
      - The Manager
  - Hazelhatch
  - Melanion
    - Toscin
    - Esquileno
    - Guido Reni
  - Heaume
    - Le Roi Soleil
      - Sans Souci
        - Sans Le Sou
        - Cherry Brandy
        - La Farina
        - Zagreus
        - Happy Go Lucky
        - Tacite
          - Alma Tadema
        - Rocking Chair
        - Sens
        - Cadum
        - Le Gros Morne
        - Manoir
        - Donatello
  - Orbend
    - Karibo

== Pedigree ==
Pedigree of Hermit (GB), chestnut stallion, 1864
Sire Newminster (GB) 1848	Touchstone; 1831	Camel*	Whalebone
Sire Newminster (GB) 1848	Touchstone; 1831	Camel*	Selim mare
Sire Newminster (GB) 1848	Touchstone; 1831	Banter	Master Henry
Sire Newminster (GB) 1848	Touchstone; 1831	Banter	Boadicea
Sire Newminster (GB) 1848	Beeswing; 1833	Dr Syntax	Paynator
Sire Newminster (GB) 1848	Beeswing; 1833	Dr Syntax	Beningborough mare
Sire Newminster (GB) 1848	Beeswing; 1833	Ardrossan mare	Androssan
Sire Newminster (GB) 1848	Beeswing; 1833	Ardrossan mare	Lady Eliza
Dam Seclusion (GB) 1857	Tadmor; 1846	Ion	Cain
Dam Seclusion (GB) 1857	Tadmor; 1846	Ion	Margaret
Dam Seclusion (GB) 1857	Tadmor; 1846	Palmyra	Sultan*
Dam Seclusion (GB) 1857	Tadmor; 1846	Palmyra	Hester*
Dam Seclusion (GB) 1857	Miss Sellon; 1851	Cowl	Bay Middleton*
Dam Seclusion (GB) 1857	Miss Sellon; 1851	Cowl	Crucifix
Dam Seclusion (GB) 1857	Miss Sellon; 1851	Belle Dame	Belshazzar
Dam Seclusion (GB) 1857	Miss Sellon; 1851	Belle Dame	Ellen (Family:5-d)

* Hermit is inbred 3S x 5D to the stallion Camel, meaning that he appears third generation on the sire side of his pedigree, and fifth generation (via Hester) on the dam side of his pedigree.

* Hermit is inbred 4D x 5D to the stallion Sultan, meaning that he appears fourth generation and fifth generation (via Bay Middleton) on the dam side of his pedigree.
