= Golden Rod Stakes (Sheepshead Bay) =

- Class: Discontinued stakes
- Location: Sheepshead Bay Race Track, Sheepshead Bay, Brooklyn, New York, United States
- Inaugurated: 1891
- Race type: Thoroughbred – Flat racing

Race information
- Distance: (6.5 furlongs)
- Surface: Turf
- Track: Left-handed
- Qualification: Two-year-olds

The Golden Rod Stakes was an American Thoroughbred horse race held annually from 1891 through 1908 at Sheepshead Bay Race Track in Sheepshead Bay, Brooklyn, New York. It was a race on turf for two-year-old horses of either sex.

== Historical notes ==
The 1891 inaugural was won by Lew Weir, owned and trained by Edward Corrigan, the Canadian-born founder and owner of Hawthorne Race Course in Stickney/Cicero, Illinois.

Henry of Navarre won the 1893 running and at age three and again at age four earned American Horse of the Year honors. He would be inducted into the U.S. Racing Hall of Fame in 1985.

Havoc won this race in 1894 for his owner and trainer David Boyle. In early 1897 Havoc was sold to Joseph E. Seagram, a major stable owner and breeder for whom David Boyle's father Charles was the trainer. Charles Boyle career would see him inducted into Canadian Horse Racing Hall of Fame. For Seagram, Havoc became a very successful sire of four King's Plate winners including Canadian Horse Racing Hall of Famer Inferno.

The 1896 Golden Rod Stakes winner was Julius Cahn's Typhoon II who went on to win the 1897 Kentucky Derby.

In addition to winning the 1903 Golden Rod Stakes, Highball won that year's runnings of the Flatbush, Grand Union Hotel and Junior Champion Stakes. Highball's 1903 performances would earn him recognition as American Champion Two-Year-Old Colt.

== The Hart–Agnew law repercussions ==
On June 11, 1908, the Republican controlled New York Legislature under Governor Charles Evans Hughes passed the Hart–Agnew anti-betting legislation. The owners of Sheepshead Bay Race Track, and other racing facilities in New York State, struggled to stay in business without income from betting. Racetrack operators had no choice but to drastically reduce the purse money being paid out which resulted in the Golden Rod Stakes offering a purse in 1908 that was less than one-third of what it had been in earlier years. These small purses made horse racing unprofitable and impossible for even the most successful horse owners to continue in business. As such, for the 1909 racing season management of the Sheepshead Bay facility dropped some of its minor stakes races and some of those that had multiple editions for the same age and/or distance qualifications. That allowed the track to use the purse money to bolster its most important events. As a result, the Golden Rod Stakes was not run in 1909.

=== The end of a racetrack ===
In spite of strong opposition by prominent owners such as August Belmont Jr. and Harry Payne Whitney, reform legislators were not happy when they learned that betting was still going on at racetracks between individuals and they had further restrictive legislation passed by the New York Legislature in 1910. The Agnew–Perkins Law, a series of four bills and recorded as the Executive Liability Act, made it possible for racetrack owners and members of its board of directors to be fined and imprisoned if anyone was found betting, even privately, anywhere on their premises. After a 1911 amendment to the law that would limit the liability of owners and directors was defeated in the Legislature, every racetrack in New York State shut down.

Owners, whose horses of racing age had nowhere to go, began sending them, their trainers and their jockeys to race in England and France. Many horses ended their racing careers there and a number remained to become an important part of the European horse breeding industry. Thoroughbred Times reported that more than 1,500 American horses were sent overseas between 1908 and 1913 and of them at least 24 were either past, present, or future Champions. When a February 21, 1913 ruling by the New York Supreme Court, Appellate Division saw horse racing return in 1913. However, it was too late for the Sheepshead Bay horse racing facility and it never reopened.

== Records ==
Speed record:

- 1:19.80 @ 6.5 furlongs – Oiseau (1904)
- 1:28.00 @ 7 furlongs – One I Love (1895) & Typhoon (1896)

Most wins by a jockey:

- 2 – Samuel Doggett (1891, 1895)
- 2 – Winfield O'Connor (1899, 1902)

Most wins by a trainer:

- No trainer won this race more than once.

Most wins by an owner:

- No owner won this race more than once.

== Winners ==
| Year | Winner | Age | Jockey | Trainer | Owner | Dist. (Furlongs) | Time | Win$ |
|---|---|---|---|---|---|---|---|---|
| 1908 | Harrigan | 2 | Joe Notter | Herman R. Brandt | Herman R. Brandt | 6.5 F | 1:21.40 | $1,050 |
| 1907 | Johnnie Blake | 2 | David Nicol | William E. Phillips | Fred Cook | 6.5 F | 1:20.60 | $2,525 |
| 1906 | Tourenne | 2 | Charles Ross | Raleigh Colston Jr. | Frederick A. Forsythe | 6.5 F | 1:20.60 | $2,625 |
| 1905 | Whimsical | 2 | Gene Hildebrand | Tim J. Gaynor | Tim J. Gaynor | 6.5 F | 1:21.40 | $2,975 |
| 1904 | Oiseau | 2 | Lucien Lyne | Carroll B. Reid | John G. Greener & Co. | 6.5 F | 1:19.80 | $2,350 |
| 1903 | Highball | 2 | Grover Fuller | John W. May | Walter M. Scheftel & John W. May | 6.5 F | 1:21.20 | $2,330 |
| 1902 | Sergeant | 2 | Winfield O'Connor | William P. Burch | Francis R. Hitchcock | 6.5 F | 1:20.80 | $2,300 |
| 1901 | Homestead | 2 | Harry Cochran | Green B. Morris | Green B. Morris | 6.5 F | 1:21.00 | $1,980 |
| 1900 | Bellario | 2 | Danny Maher | Fred Burlew | Newton Bennington | 6.5 F | 1:21.60 | $1,640 |
| 1899 | Colonel Roosevelt | 2 | Winfield O'Connor | Robert Augustus Smith | Robert Augustus Smith | 6.5 F | 1:21.40 | $1,770 |
| 1898 | Rhinelander | 2 | Willie Simms | John E. Madden | John E. Madden | 6.5 F | 1:23.00 | $820 |
| 1897 | Easter Gift | 2 | Skeets Martin | Frank E. Brown | James R. Keene | 6.5 F | 1:21.20 | $1,150 |
| 1896 | Typhoon II | 2 | Willie Martin | Julius C. Cahn | Julius C. Cahn | 7 F | 1:28.00 | $1,150 |
| 1895 | One I Love | 2 | Samuel Doggett | John J. Hyland | William P. Thompson | 7 F | 1:28.00 | $1,150 |
| 1894 | Havoc | 2 | Henry Griffin | David A. Boyle | David A. Boyle | 7 F | 1:29.40 | $1,180 |
| 1893 | Henry of Navarre | 2 | Clarence Bryant | Byron McClelland | Byron McClelland | 7 F | 1:30.00 | $1,035 |
| 1892 | Prince George | 2 | John Lamley | Michael J. Daly | William C. Daly | 7 F | 1:29.40 | $1,270 |
| 1891 | Lew Weir | 2 | Samuel Doggett | Edward C. Corrigan | Edward C. Corrigan | 7 F | 1:29.60 | $1,245 |
