= Marty Bergen (jockey) =

American jockey

Personal information
- Born: 1869
- Died: October 7, 1906 (aged 37) Griffin's Corners, New York, United States
- Resting place: Sleepy Hollow Cemetery, Sleepy Hollow, New York

Horse racing career
- Sport: Horse racing

Major racing wins
- Belles Stakes (1889); Dolphin Stakes (1889); Reapers Stakes (1889); Second Special Stakes (1889); Carlton Stakes (1890); Hudson Stakes (1890); Spindrift Stakes (1890); Spring Stakes (1890); Travers Stakes (1890); Zephyr Stakes (1890); Cherry Diamond Handicap (1891, divisions 1&2); Dash Stakes (1891); Double Event Stakes (1891, 1892); Flash Stakes (1891); Flatbush Stakes (1891); Foam Stakes (1891); Great Eastern Handicap (1891); Great Trial Stakes (1891); Pansy Stakes (1891); Suburban Handicap (1891); Surf Stakes (1891); Daisy Stakes (1892); Freehold Stakes (1892); Holly Stakes (1892); September Stakes (1892); Thornton Stakes (1895); Burns Handicap (1897); Palace Hotel Stakes (1897)

Racing awards
- United States Champion Jockey by wins (1890)

Significant horses
- His Highness, Kingston, Loantaka, Longstreet, Reclare, Salvator, Sir John, Strathmeath

Martin Bergen (1869 – October 7, 1906) was an American National Champion jockey in Thoroughbred racing. As a result of his 1888 success in wintertime racing at the Guttenberg and Clifton Race Tracks in New Jersey, for 1889 Bergen was contracted to ride for the prominent stable of Samuel S. Brown. He would end the year as the United States number two jockey in total wins behind only Shelby Barnes and in 1890 he would win National riding honors.

Marty Bergen was the eldest of his brothers Joseph and Michael who were also jockeys. Joseph (Joe) Bergen died on January 6, 1893, as a result of a racing accident at the racecourse in Gloucester City, New Jersey.

On August 28, 1890, Marty Bergen rode Salvator in a "race against the clock" at Monmouth Park Racetrack in New Jersey in which he shattered the American record for a mile distance on dirt with a time of 1:35 1/2.

Marty Bergen died at age 37 from Consumption at a sanitarium in New York's Catskills. He left behind a wife and two children.
