= Shotover (horse) =

British-bred Thoroughbred racehorse

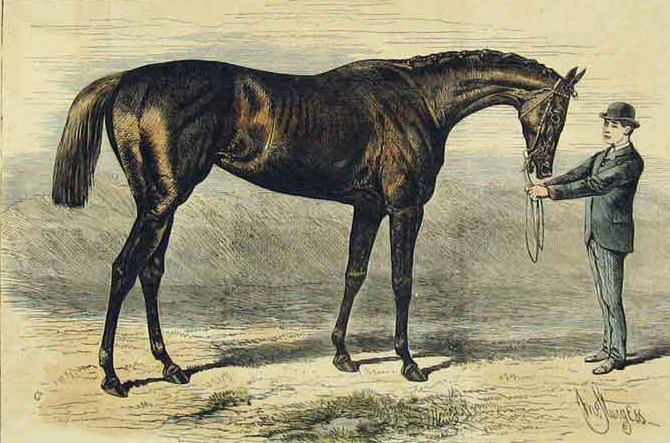
- Shotover, from Illustrated London News, 1882
- Sire: Hermit
- Grandsire: Newminster
- Dam: Stray Shot
- Damsire: Toxophilite
- Sex: Mare
- Foaled: 1879
- Country: United Kingdom of Great Britain and Ireland
- Colour: Bay
- Breeder: Henry Chaplin, 1st Viscount Chaplin
- Owner: Hugh Grosvenor, 1st Duke of Westminster
- Trainer: Robert Peck; John Porter
- Record: 15: 5-3-3
- Earnings: £12,205 win prize money only

Major wins
- 2000 Guineas (1882); Epsom Derby (1882); Ascot Derby (1882); Triennial Stakes (1882); Park Hill Stakes (1882)

Shotover (1879–1898) was a British Thoroughbred racehorse and broodmare. In a career that lasted from 1882 to 1884, she ran 15 times and won five races. As a three-year-old, racing against colts, she became the first filly to win the first two legs of the English Triple Crown: the 2000 Guineas at Newmarket and the Derby at Epsom. She went on to win twice at Royal Ascot, but failed in her bid for the Triple Crown when she finished third in the St Leger at Doncaster. She was retired in 1884 and became a successful and influential broodmare. Shotover died in 1898.

== Background ==
Shotover was a powerfully built chestnut filly with a white star, standing just under 15.3 hands high, who was praised for her "lean and game-looking" head and "beautifully formed" legs. She was bred by Henry Chaplin, who was best known for winning the Derby with Shotover's sire Hermit in 1867. As a yearling, she was bought for 1,600 guineas by the trainer Robert Peck on behalf of the Duke of Westminster, the "richest man in England", who agreed to buy the filly after some hesitation. When Peck retired at the end of Shotover's two-year-old season, the filly was moved to the stable of John Porter at Kingsclere.

After his retirement from racing, Shotover's sire Hermit became an outstandingly successful stallion, being Champion Sire for seven successive years. In addition to Shotover, he sired the Classic winners St. Blaise (Derby), St. Marguerite (1000 Guineas), Lonely (Oaks) and Thebais (1000 Guineas & Oaks).

== Racing career ==
=== 1881: two-year-old season ===
Shotover was slow to mature as a young horse and did not appear on the racecourse until the autumn of 1881. She made her debut as a 50/1 outsider in the prestigious Middle Park Plate at Newmarket on October 12. She ran rather better than her odds suggested, racing prominently, and finishing fifth of the 13 runners behind Kermesse. She then finished second to Berwick in the Prendergast Stakes. On her final start of the season, she finished unplaced behind Magician in a Nursery (a handicap race for two-year-olds).

=== 1882: three-year-old season ===
==== Spring ====
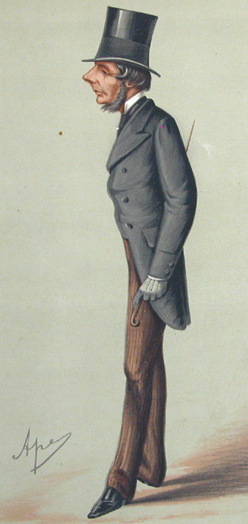
The Duke of Westminster, Shotover's owner

Shotover made excellent physical progress in the winter of 1881-2 and was described as "one of the most improved" of her owner's three-year-olds. She also impressed her trainer with her performance in a private trial in early April, persuading him that she had Classic potential. Although the classic generation of 1882 contained few top-class colts, there were some outstanding fillies, including St Marguerite, Dutch Oven, and Shotover's stable companion Geheimness. It was therefore decided that Shotover's three-year-old debut would be against colts in the 2000 Guineas. Five days before the race, she appeared in the betting for the first time and was quickly backed down from odds of 25/1, attracting the attention of the sporting papers such as Bell's Life and The Sportsman.

On 26 April, on very heavy ground and in "wretchedly untoward" weather, Shotover started at 10/1 in a field of 18. The filly broke quickly, but was soon settled by Tom Cannon and raced just behind the leaders for the first half of the race. Two furlongs out, Shotover was seen to be travelling very easily ("pulling double") as she moved up to challenge. She went to the front effortlessly before pulling away to win by two lengths from Quicklime, with a further four lengths back to Marden in third. Two days later, she ran against her own sex in the 1000 Guineas. Only five fillies opposed her, and Shotover was the subject of heavy betting which saw her start the 1/4 favourite. Shotover took the lead a furlong out, but was caught in the closing stages and beaten a head by St Marguerite, with Nellie only a head away in third. Shotover had probably not helped her chances when she broke loose before the race, reared up, and fell on her back.

==== Summer ====
In the Derby at Epsom on 24 May, Shotover started at odds of 11/2 in a field of 14. Cannon held the filly up at the back of the field in the early stages as the favourite, Bruce disputed the lead with Marden for most of the way. Turning into the straight, the two leaders ran wide when Bruce shied at some flying paper and Cannon sent Shotover through the gap left on the inside to move into contention. Two furlongs from the finish, Quicklime took the lead from Bruce as Shotover moved up into third. Quicklime briefly went clear and looked the likely winner. Cannon, however, produced Shotover with a well-timed run to take the lead in the closing stages and win "cleverly" by three-quarters of a length from Quicklime with the pair well clear of the American colt Sachem, who finished strongly to take third. The finish of the race was reportedly captured in a perfect "sun picture" by a London photographer. Shotover became the third filly to win the race following Eleanor in 1801 and Blink Bonny in 1857. Shotover was entered in the Oaks two days later, but did not run, the race going to her stable companion Geheimniss, which defeated St Marguerite.

Shotover was then sent to Royal Ascot in June, where she ran in the Ascot Derby, the race now known as the King Edward VII Stakes, in which she was required to give weight to the four colts that opposed her. Cannon held her up in last place until the straight. She then moved smoothly through along the rail to take the lead "with her ears pricked" and pulled away to win very easily by four lengths from Battlefield. At the end of the meeting, she recorded a meaningless victory when she was allowed a walk-over in the Triennial Stakes

==== Autumn ====
On September 15, she attempted to win the Triple Crown in the St Leger at Doncaster. This race marked the first racecourse meeting between Shotover and Geheimniss, and the betting reflected their trainer's opinion of their relative merits with Shotover starting on 7/1 while her stable companion was made the 11/8 favourite. Ridden by Rossiter, Shotover was held up as usual as Actress made the running. In the straight, however, she could make no impression on the leaders and finished third behind Dutch Oven and Geheimniss, beaten one and half lengths and four lengths. The result emphasised the total dominance of females in 1882. Not only did fillies fill the first three places, but Dutch Oven's win also meant they had, for the first and only time, won all five of the season's Classics.

Two days later, she ran in the Park Hill Stakes over the same course and distance, and started 4/7 favourite against three opponents. Reunited with Tom Cannon, who had ridden a colt called Romeo in the St Leger, Shotover settled in third place before moving up to challenge the leaders a furlong out. She quickly went clear and won "in a canter" by four lengths from Whin Blossom. On her final start of the year, she ran in the Select Stakes at Newmarket in which she was required to give 10 pounds to the top-class fillies Kermesse and Nellie. Shotover found the concession too much and finished third behind her two opponents, which dead-heated for first place (Kermesse claimed the prize money as Nellie's connections declined to take part in a run-off).

=== 1883: four-year-old season ===
Shotover did not show her best form as a four-year-old. She began at Epsom on April 18, when she carried 121 pounds in the 10-furlong City and Suburban Handicap at Epsom. She was strongly fancied for the race and started 5/2 favourite, but made no real challenge and finished unplaced behind Roysterer, which carried 98 pounds. Shotover returned to Epsom on 25 May for the Epsom Gold Cup (the race now known as the Coronation Cup) in which she faced the outstanding five-year-old Tristan, who started as the odds-on favourite. Ridden by Fred Archer, she was behind for the whole of the race and finished last of the four runners. Shotover was entered in the Ascot Gold Cup, but ran instead in the Triennial Stakes at the same meeting in which she finished third to the colt Palermo, to which she was conceding 19 pounds.

== Stud career ==
Shotover was retired to the owner's Eaton Stud in Cheshire. Her best runner was the colt Bullingdon, by Melton, who was narrowly beaten by Isinglass in the Princess of Wales's Stakes, with Ladas third. Her most significant descendant, however, was Frizette, who became one of the most influential broodmares of the 20th century. Shotover was destroyed at the Eaton Stud in late 1898 after being barren for two years.

== Pedigree ==
Pedigree of Shotover (GB), chestnut mare, 1879
| Sire Hermit (GB) 1864 | Newminster; 1848 | Touchstone | Camel |
| Sire Hermit (GB) 1864 | Newminster; 1848 | Touchstone | Banter |
| Sire Hermit (GB) 1864 | Newminster; 1848 | Beeswing | Doctor Syntax |
| Sire Hermit (GB) 1864 | Newminster; 1848 | Beeswing | Ardrossan mare |
| Sire Hermit (GB) 1864 | Seclusion; 1857 | Tadmor | Ion |
| Sire Hermit (GB) 1864 | Seclusion; 1857 | Tadmor | Palmyra |
| Sire Hermit (GB) 1864 | Seclusion; 1857 | Miss Sellon | Cowl |
| Sire Hermit (GB) 1864 | Seclusion; 1857 | Miss Sellon | Belle Dame |
| Dam Stray Shot (GB) 1872 | Toxophilite; 1855 | Longbow | Ithuriel |
| Dam Stray Shot (GB) 1872 | Toxophilite; 1855 | Longbow | Miss Bowe |
| Dam Stray Shot (GB) 1872 | Toxophilite; 1855 | Legerdemain | Pantaloon |
| Dam Stray Shot (GB) 1872 | Toxophilite; 1855 | Legerdemain | Decoy |
| Dam Stray Shot (GB) 1872 | Vaga; 1858 | Stockwell | The Baron |
| Dam Stray Shot (GB) 1872 | Vaga; 1858 | Stockwell | Pocahontas |
| Dam Stray Shot (GB) 1872 | Vaga; 1858 | Mendicant | Touchstone |
| Dam Stray Shot (GB) 1872 | Vaga; 1858 | Mendicant | Lady Moore Carew (Family: 13-c) |
