= Henry of Navarre (disambiguation) =

Henry of Navarre may refer to:

- Henry I of Navarre, reigned 1270–74
- Henry II of Navarre, reigned 1517–55
- Henry IV of France, also Henry III of Navarre, reigned 1572–1610
- Henry of Navarre (horse), a racehorse
