= Vadsco Sales =

American holding company

- Company type: Holding company
- Industry: Consumer goods (perfumes and toiletries); pharmaceuticals; medical and surgical supplies
- Founded: 1928
- Defunct: 1943
- Fate: Merged with subsidiary Delettrez, Inc.; continued as Universal Laboratories, Inc.
- Successor: Universal Laboratories, Inc.
- Headquarters: New York City, United States
- Area served: United States
- Products: Perfumes; toiletries; drugs; surgical and hospital supplies
- Subsidiaries: V. Vivaudou; American Druggists' Syndicate; Kny-Scheerer Corporation; Delettrez, Inc.

Vadsco Sales was a holding company for makers of perfumes, toiletries, drugs, etc., which was formed in New York City in the 1920s. V. Vivaudou, an auto company, and perfume manufacturer, was one of its subsidiaries. The Vadsco Sales Corporation was a consolidation (business) of V. Vivaudou, Inc., the American Druggists Syndicate, and Kny Scheerer Corporation. The latter firm was among the oldest and largest manufacturers and dealers of surgical and hospital supplies and equipment in the United States.

Additional companies included in the December 1928 merger which formed Vadsco Sales were the Alfred H. Smith Company, Farfumerie Melba, Inc., Delettrez, Inc., and Kleanwell, Inc. Each of the individual businesses retained its trade name and its trademark.

The merger of Delettrez, Inc., and its parent company, Vadsco Sales, in April 1943, resulted in the creation of Universal Laboratories.

== Business and subsidiaries ==
Vadsco functioned as a holding and sales organization for a group of operating companies:

- V. Vivaudou (perfumes and toiletries)
- American Druggists' Syndicate (drug manufacturing and distribution)
- Kny-Scheerer Corporation (surgical and hospital supplies and equipment)
- Delettrez, Inc. (a subsidiary involved in the 1943 merger described below)
