= St. Blaise (horse) =

British-bred Thoroughbred racehorse

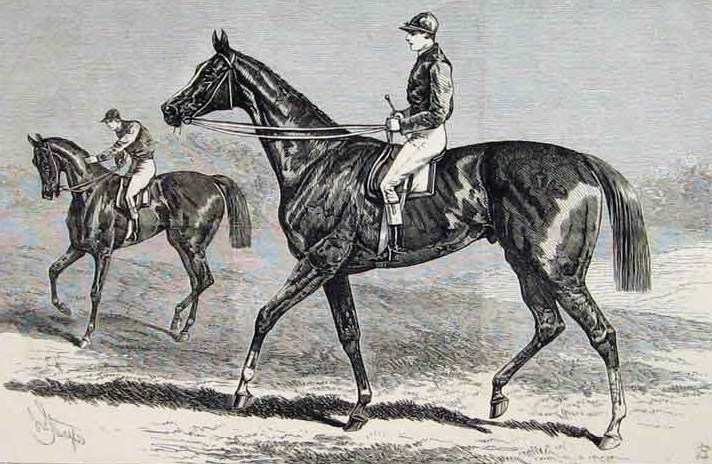
- St. Blaise, depicted in the Illustrated London News
- Sire: Hermit
- Grandsire: Newminster
- Dam: Fusee
- Damsire: Marsyas
- Sex: Stallion
- Foaled: 1880
- Country: United Kingdom of Great Britain and Ireland
- Colour: Chestnut
- Breeder: Henry Sturt, 1st Baron Alington
- Owner: Sir Frederick Johnstone, 8th Baronet and Lord Alington; Sir John Blundell Maple, 1st Baronet
- Trainer: John Porter
- Record: 12:7-2-1
- Earnings: £7,653 (1882 & 1883)

Major wins
- Molecomb Stakes (1882); Epsom Derby (1883)

St. Blaise (1880–1909) was a British Thoroughbred racehorse and sire. In a career that lasted from 1882 to 1884 he ran twelve time and won seven races, although three of these wins were walk-overs. His most important success came in 1883 when he won The Derby. At the end of the season he was sold and exported to the United States to stand as a stallion where he had some success. St. Blaise was killed in a fire in 1909.

== Background ==
St. Blaise was a “big, slashing” chestnut horse standing just under 16 hands high, with a white blaze and three white feet. He was bred at Crichel in Dorset by Henry Sturt, 1st Baron Alington, who owned him during his racing career in partnership with Sir Frederick Johnstone. The colt was first sent into training with Lord Alington's private trainer H. Percy in Dorset, but was moved at the end of his two-year-old season to the stables of John Porter at Kingsclere.

St. Blaise's sire Hermit won the Derby in 1867 and later became an outstandingly successful stallion, being Champion Sire for seven successive years. In addition to St. Blaise, he sired the Classic winners Shotover (2000 Guineas & Derby), St. Marguerite (1000 Guineas), Lonely (Oaks) and Thebais (1000 Guineas & Oaks). His dam, Fusee made little impact as a racehorse, and was close to being destroyed after her career was ended by injury. She survived however, to become a good broodmare, producing, in addition to St. Blaise, good winners such as Candlemas (Chesterfield Cup, Epsom Grand Prize) and Friar Rush (Salisbury Cup).

== Racing career ==
=== 1882: two-year-old season ===
St. Blaise began his racing career at Stockbridge Racecourse in June 1882. He won a Biennial Stakes and then walked over in the Troy Stakes, before finishing second to Macheath in the Hurstbourne Stakes. Later in the season Macheath won the July Stakes and the Middle Park Plate. St. Blaise was then sent to Goodwood for the Molecomb Stakes in which he dead-heated for first place when attempting to give seven pounds Elzevir, a horse who went on to win the Royal Hunt Cup.

On 27 October he was sent to Newmarket to run in the Dewhurst Stakes for which he started 3/1 second favourite. He started quickly but dropped away in the closing stages and finished unplaced behind Ladislas. On the following day on the same course he won a weakly contested race for the Troy Stakes (the event was run twice a year) in which he beat Pebble by a neck. Following the race he was described in The Sportsman as a "nice colt" and a "thorough stayer", but below Derby class.

=== 1883: three-year-old season ===
==== Spring ====
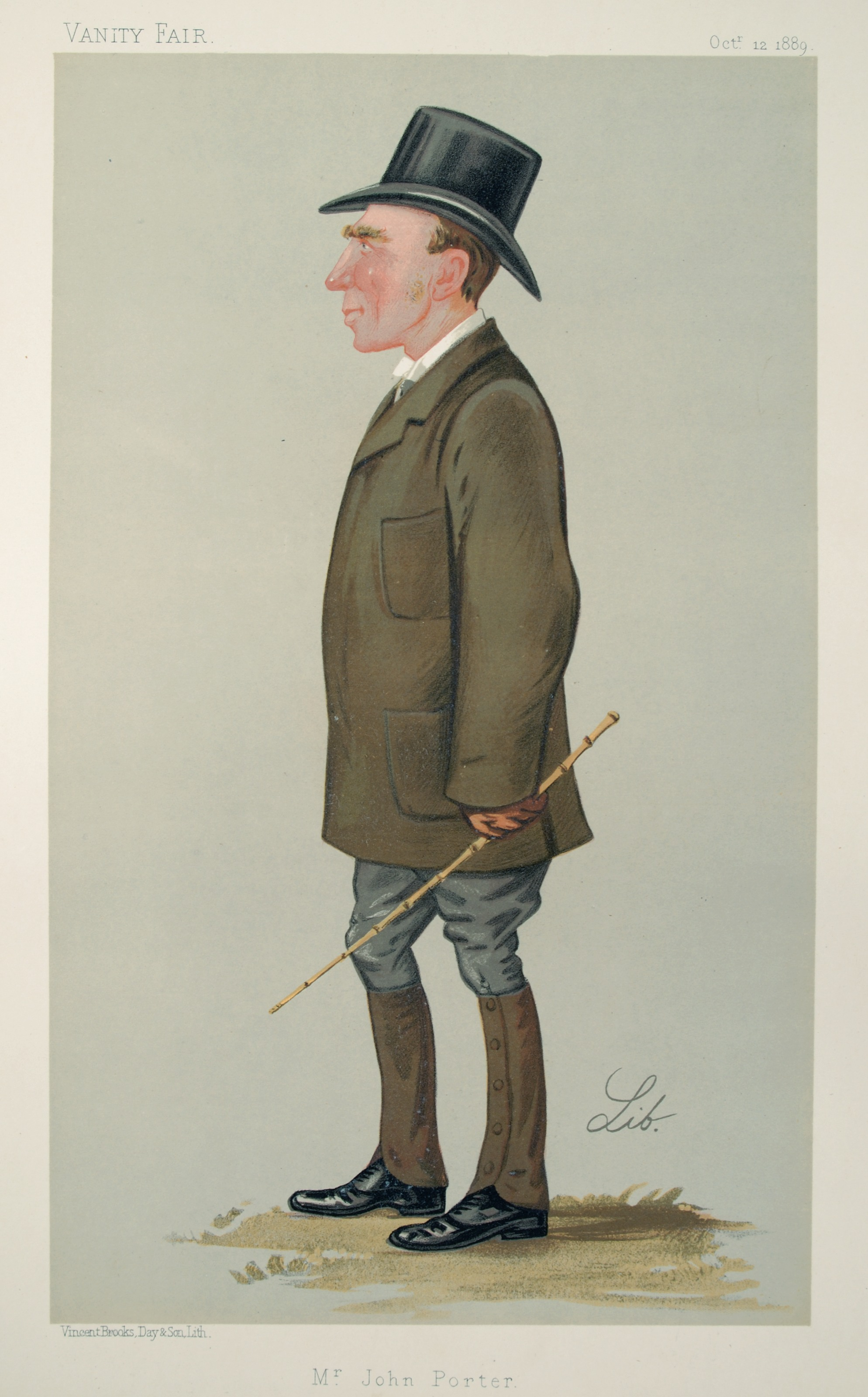
John Porter, St. Blaise's trainer in 1883.

St. Blaise grew and made good physical progress during the winter and in mid-April he appeared for the first time in the Derby betting lists at 33/1. He made his seasonal debut on 25 April in the 2000 Guineas at Newmarket, for which he started at odds of 25/1 in a field of fifteen and was ridden by George Barrett. He was not fully fit but produced a promising performance to finish fourth behind Galliard, doing the best of the colts who had raced on the far side of the course. Immediately after the race he was offered at odds of 11/1 for the Derby.

St. Blaise was then trained more vigorously and ran impressively in a private trial race on the Friday before the Derby. The Prince of Wales was visiting Kingsclere at the time and was impressed enough with St. Blaise to place a large bet on the colt for the Derby. Shortly before the Derby, St. Blaise and his connections travelled to Epsom and stayed nearby at an inn called the Sheepshearer's Arms at Burgh Heath. This was interpreted as a good omen at the original St. Blaise was the patron saint of the wool trade.

==== Epsom Derby ====
At Epsom on 23 May St. Blaise started at odds of 5/1 in a field of fifteen. The race took place in fine weather in front of an "immense" crowd which included the Prince and Princess of Wales and other members of the royal family. Galliard, ridden by Fred Archer started favourite on 9/2 while one of the outsiders was Highland Chief (trained by Archer's brother, Charles). The potential conflict of interest for Fred Archer, who was believed to have a strong interest in his brother's stable had been highlighted as a cause for concern. St. Blaise, ridden by Charles Wood, was held up in the early stages as the pacemaker Bonjour made the running but moved into contention at Tattenham Corner. Wood sent St. Blaise through a gap on the inside on the home turn to take the lead as the field entered the straight. St Blaise was briefly challenged by Beau Brummel and then Galliard before Highland Chief emerged with a powerful late run. In the final furlong St Blaise ran on gamely to win a "most exciting race" by a neck (other reports say a head) from Highland Chief with Galliard half a length further back in third.

The Prince of Wales, who had won a reported £5,000 on the race, was among the first to congratulate his owners and later hosted a "brilliant party" to celebrate St Blaise's victory. There were later allegations that Fred Archer had “pulled” Galliard to allow Highland Chief to win. One version of the conspiracy theory claimed that Highland Chief crossed the line in front, but that the racecourse judge awarded the race to St. Blaise because he wanted to frustrate the plans of the Archer brothers.

==== After Epsom ====
St. Blaise was then sent to France for the Grand Prix de Paris over 3000m at Longchamp on 5 June. Ridden by Archer, he started favourite at 4/5 against five French opponents. He was held up in the early stages before making his challenge just as Frontin, ridden by Tom Cannon, took the lead in the straight. St Blaise and the French colt had a "splendid race" in the closing stages, but although the Derby winner steadily reduced the margin between them he could not overhaul the leader and was beaten by a head. The French celebrations which followed, involving hat-throwing, singing and flag-waving were described as "disgusting" by a British observer.

Only three days after his run in France, St. Blaise was sent to Royal Ascot for the Ascot Derby, a race now known as the King Edward VII Stakes. He was made 5/4 favourite, but after going well until the straight he appeared to "cut it" (give up) and finished a well beaten third of the four runners behind Ladislas and Ossian.

=== 1884: four-year-old season ===
St. Blaise was kept in training at four and was among the entries for the Ascot Gold Cup the proposed Eclipse Stakes and the Manchester Cup.

He made his first appearance in the City and Suburban Handicap at Epsom on April 23 in which he carried 124 pounds and started 7/2 favourite. He raced prominently and led the field into the straight but faded badly in the last quarter of a mile and finished among the back markers.

The City and Suburban was St Blaise's last competitive race although he had two walk-over wins in either late 1883 or 1884.

== Assessment and earnings ==
St Blaise earned £2,106 as a two-year-old, and £5,547 at three, placing him fifth on the 1883 list behind Ossian, Galliard, Tristan and Superba. He was considered by some to have been a lucky winner of the Derby: Border Minstrel, who was not entered for the Epsom race, was considered by many to have been the best colt of the year.

== Stud career ==
At the end of his racing career, St. Blaise was sold to August Belmont and exported to the United States. When Belmont died in 1890, St. Blaise was sold at auction where he was bought for $100,000 by Charles Reed of Tennessee. He was later sold to James Ben Ali Haggin and then to August Belmont Jr. The best of St. Blaise's progeny included Potomac, who was the outstanding American two-year-old of 1890 when he won the Belmont Futurity Stakes and Margrave the winner of the 1896 Preakness Stakes. St. Blaise lived to the advanced age (for a Thoroughbred) of twenty-nine when he was killed in a fire at the Nursery Stud at Lexington, Kentucky on 14 October 1909.

== Sire line tree ==
- St Blaise
  - St Carlo
  - Potomac
  - Silver Fox
    - Sly Fox
  - St Florian
  - Margrave
    - Margraviate
  - St Bartholomew

== Pedigree ==
Pedigree of St. Blaise (GB), chestnut stallion, 1880
| Sire Hermit (GB) 1864 | Newminster; 1848 | Touchstone* | Camel* |
| Sire Hermit (GB) 1864 | Newminster; 1848 | Touchstone* | Banter* |
| Sire Hermit (GB) 1864 | Newminster; 1848 | Beeswing | Dr Syntax |
| Sire Hermit (GB) 1864 | Newminster; 1848 | Beeswing | Ardrossan mare |
| Sire Hermit (GB) 1864 | Seclusion; 1857 | Tadmor | Ion |
| Sire Hermit (GB) 1864 | Seclusion; 1857 | Tadmor | Palmyra |
| Sire Hermit (GB) 1864 | Seclusion; 1857 | Miss Sellon | Cowl |
| Sire Hermit (GB) 1864 | Seclusion; 1857 | Miss Sellon | Belle Dame |
| Dam Fusee (GB) 1867 | Marsyas; 1851 | Orlando | Touchstone* |
| Dam Fusee (GB) 1867 | Marsyas; 1851 | Orlando | Vulture |
| Dam Fusee (GB) 1867 | Marsyas; 1851 | Malibran | Whisker |
| Dam Fusee (GB) 1867 | Marsyas; 1851 | Malibran | Garcia |
| Dam Fusee (GB) 1867 | Vesuvienne; 1847 | Gladiator | Partisan |
| Dam Fusee (GB) 1867 | Vesuvienne; 1847 | Gladiator | Pauline |
| Dam Fusee (GB) 1867 | Vesuvienne; 1847 | Venus | Sir Hercules |
| Dam Fusee (GB) 1867 | Vesuvienne; 1847 | Venus | Echo (Family: 22-b) |

* St Blaise is inbred 3S x 4D to the stallion Touchstone, meaning that he appears third generation on the sire side of his pedigree, and fourth generation on the dam side of his pedigree.
