= 1882 Epsom Derby =

The 1882 Epsom Derby was a horse race which took place at Epsom Downs on 24 May 1882 near Epsom in Surrey, England. It was the 102nd running of the Derby. The race was won by Shotover in a popular victory for Hugh Grosvenor, 1st Duke of Westminster. The winner was ridden by Tom Cannon Sr., and thus became the first filly ever to win the first two legs of the English Triple Crown: the 2000 Guineas at Newmarket and the Derby at Epsom.
