= Great Eastern Handicap =

- Class: Discontinued stakes
- Location: Sheepshead Bay Race Track, Sheepshead Bay, Brooklyn, New York
- Inaugurated: 1883–1909
- Race type: Thoroughbred – Flat racing

Race information
- Distance: 6 furlongs
- Track: Dirt, left-handed
- Qualification: Two years old
- Purse: US$2,000

The Great Eastern Handicap was an American Thoroughbred horse race first run in 1883 at Sheepshead Bay Race Track in Sheepshead Bay, Brooklyn, New York. A race for two-year-old horses of either sex, it was run on dirt over a distance of 6 furlongs.

== The end of a race and of a racetrack ==
The Great Eastern Handicap was last run in September 1909 after the Republican controlled New York Legislature under Governor Charles Evans Hughes passed the Hart–Agnew anti-betting legislation on June 11, 1908. The owners of Sheepshead Bay Race Track, and other racing facilities in New York State, struggled to stay in business without betting. Racetrack operators had no choice but to drastically reduce the purse money being paid out which resulted in the Great Eastern Handicap offering a purse in 1909 that was one-quarter of what it had been in earlier years. These small purses made horse racing unprofitable and impossible for even the most successful horse owners to continue in business. As such, for the 1910 racing season management of the Sheepshead Bay facility dropped some of its minor stakes races and used the purse money to bolster its most important events. Further restrictive legislation was passed by the New York Legislature in 1910 which resulted in the deepening of the financial crisis for track operators and led to a complete shut down of racing across the state during 1911 and 1912. When a Court ruling saw racing return in 1913 it was too late for the Sheepshead Bay facility and it never reopened.

== Historical notes ==
Jockey LaVerne Sewell, who won the 1906 edition, was killed in a racing accident later that year at Aqueduct Racetrack on November 9. In its story on the accident, the Pittsburgh Press called Sewell one of the most promising riders in the East. Sewell's death had been the fourth on the Eastern racetracks so far that year.

Race distances:

- 6 furlongs: 1883–1889, 1901–1909
- 5.75 furlongs: 1890–1900 (Futurity course 1263 yards, 1 foot)

== Records ==
Speed record:

- 5.75 furlongs: 1:09.20 – Black Venus (1898)
- 6 furlongs: 1:10.60 – Sewell (1906)

Most wins by a jockey:

- 2 – Edward Garrison (1883, 1892)
- 2 – Anthony Hamilton (1887, 1893)
- 2 – Fred Taral (1896, 1897)

Most wins by a trainer: Ŧ

- 3 – A. Jack Joyner (1892, 1903, 1904)

Most wins by an owner:

- 2 – Blemton Stable (August Belmont Jr.) (1892, 1893)
- 2 – John E. Madden (1897, 1907)

Ŧ based on 23 of the 27 years the race was run.

== Winners ==
Year	Winner	Age	Jockey	Trainer	Owner	Dist. (Miles)	Time	Win$
1909	Livonia	2	Eddie Martin	Max Hirsch	Max Hirsch	6 F	1:12.40	$1,425
1908	Mediant	2	Dalton McCarthy	John Huggins	Herman B. Duryea	6 F	1:11.20	$5,850
1907	Meelick	2	Eddie Dugan	John E. Madden	John E. Madden	6 F	1:13.20	$5,850
1906	Sewell	2	LaVerne Sewell	Charles E. Rowe	Charles E. Rowe	6 F	1:10.60	$5,850
1905	Burgomaster	2	Gene Hildebrand	John W. Rogers	Harry Payne Whitney	6 F	1:12.80	$5,850
1904	Tradition	2	Lucien Lyne	A. Jack Joyner	Sydney Paget	6 F	1:11.60	$5,925
1903	Lady Amelia	2	Jack Martin	Woodford Clay	Woodford Clay	6 F	1:12.00	$5,850
1902	Golden Maxim	2	Frank Landry	James J. McLaughlin	J. P. Kramer	6 F	1:14.40	$5,925
1901	Endurance by Right	2	Johnny Woods	John F. Schorr	John W. Schorr	6 F	1:13.00	$5,850
1900	Beau Gallant	2	John Bullman	Sam Hildreth	Sam Hildreth	5.75 F	1:12.80	$5,850
1899	Mesmerist	2	Winfield O'Connor	Julius Bauer	Bromley & Co. (Joseph E. Bromley & Arthur Featherstone)	5.75 F	1:10.40	$3,970
1898	Black Venus	2	Tod Sloan	H. Eugene Leigh	Ella O. Pepper	5.75 F	1:09.20	$3,900
1897	Hamburg	2	Fred Taral	John E. Madden	John E. Madden	5.75 F	1:10.20	$3,975
1896	Ogden	2	Fred Taral	William Lakeland	Marcus Daly	5.75 F	1:10.00	$3,840
1895	One I Love	2	Samuel Doggett	John J. Hyland	William P. Thompson	5.75 F	1:10.20	$3,925
1894	Gutta Percha	2	Fred Littlefield	R. Wyndham Walden	J. A. Morris, A. H. & D. H. Morris	5.75 F	1:10.00	$3,900
1893	Jack of Spades	2	Anthony Hamilton	A. Jack Joyner	Blemton Stable (August Belmont Jr.)	5.75 F	1:13.00	$7,900
1892	Lady Violet	2	Edward Garrison	A. Jack Joyner	Blemton Stable (August Belmont Jr.)	5.75 F	1:10.20	$7,340
1891	Ludwig	2	Marty Bergen		John Daly	5.75 F	1:10.40	$8,663
1890	Sallie McClelland	2	Shelby Barnes	Byron McClelland	Byron McClelland	5.75 F	1:14.40	$8,274
1889	Tournament	2	William R. Midgely	Matthew M. Allen	George Hearst	6 F	1:17.00	$8,337
1888	Diablo	2	Jim McLaughlin	James H. Dumas	Castle Stable (Mr. A. Kraemer)	6 F	1:17.00	$6,920
1887	Raceland	2	Anthony Hamilton	Frank McCabe	Joseph F. Ullman	6 F	1:15.75	$7,508
1886	King Fox	2	John Spellman	James Murphy	James B. A. Haggin	6 F	1:15.00	$7,298
1885	Dew Drop	2	Harris Olney	Matthew Byrnes	Rancocas Stable (Pierre Lorillard)	6 F	1:16.75	$7,592
1884	Ten Stone	2	J. Caldwell	Green B. Morris	Morris & Patton	6 F	1:16.50	$7,710
1883	Dutch Roller	2	Edward Garrison		James R. Keene	6 F	1:17.00	$6,137
