= Byron McClelland =

American Thoroughbred racehorse owner and trainer

Personal information
- Born: c. 1855 Lexington, Kentucky, United States
- Died: June 11, 1897
- Occupation: Trainer/Owner/Breeder

Horse racing career
- Sport: Horse racing
- Career wins: Not found

Major racing wins
- Foam Stakes (1884, 1885); Coney Island Derby (1887); Eclipse Stakes (1890); Great Eastern Handicap (1890); Spinaway Stakes (1890); Surf Stakes (1890); Alabama Stakes (1891); United States Hotel Stakes (1891); Manhattan Handicap (1891); Dolphin Stakes (1892, 1894); Dash Stakes (1893, 1898); Golden Rod Stakes (1893); Double Event Stakes (part 2) (1894); Spindrift Stakes (1894); Phoenix Hotel Stakes (1895); Clark Handicap (1895); Flight Stakes (1895); Sapphire Stakes (1898) American Classic Race wins: Belmont Stakes (1894); Kentucky Derby (1895); Preakness Stakes (1896)

Significant horses
- Sallie McClelland, Bermuda; Halma, Henry of Navarre, Margrave

Byron McClelland (1855 – June 11, 1897) was an American Thoroughbred horse racing owner and trainer. He was one of the best known horsemen of his era who won the three races that would eventually constitute the United States Triple Crown of Thoroughbred Racing series.

Born in Lexington, Kentucky, Byron McClelland's father trained horses, and his brother John W. McClelland (1849–1911) also trained horses in California. Young McClelland worked as a stable boy, but urged into a different career by his mother, left his job to go to work for a local newspaper. Nevertheless, the newspaper's owner operated a horse racing stable and offered the knowledgeable twenty-year-old McClelland a chance to train his horses. Five years later, success led McClelland being hired by H. Price McGrath, owner of the prominent McGrathiana Stud. Within a short time he left to set up his own racing stable in partnership with Dick Roche. McClelland proved to be not only a very capable trainer, but also an astute judge of horse talent. For the new partnership he turned an August Belmont castoff named Badge into a significant winner. McClelland purchased Badge for a "song" after the prominent owner had given up on the colt. Having accumulated sufficient capital, McClelland chose to go his own way and in November 1889 the McClelland-Roche stable was sold at auction at the Elizabeth, New Jersey, race track.

== The Sport of Kings ==
Competing in the "Sport of Kings" was difficult because it was dominated by the extremely wealthy who could afford to spend vast sums to purchase the best-bred horses. He used his skills to make a living training horses for others plus his knowledge of horses to buy young unraced thoroughbreds for himself at a price he could afford. Once he developed a young horse into a top runner, he could sell it at a substantial price both as a racer and for its eventual stallion or broodmare value. Profits from the sale of a top racehorse would go to expanding his racing and breeding operation by acquiring new young bloodstock.

== The McClelland Stable ==
By the time Byron McClelland had struck out on his own for the 1890 racing season, he was already gaining national attention. His immediate $2,500 purchase of a yearling filly he named for his wife, Sallie, once again demonstrated his knowledge of breeding and conformation. Among her wins, Sallie McClelland captured the 1890 Spinaway Stakes and set an earnings record for two-year-old fillies of $53,969. She was retrospectively chosen the 1890 American Co-Champion Filly. An injury on May 2, 1891, when she stumbled and fell at the racetrack in Lexington, Kentucky, severely hampered her performance that year with her only major win coming in a two-horse race in the 1891 Alabama Stakes. At the same time, another of his horses named Bermuda won several important races in 1891 including the United States Hotel Stakes and the Manhattan Handicap. After their racing careers were over, both Sallie McClelland and Bermuda were retained by Byron McClelland for breeding purposes.

=== American Horse of the Year ===
Byron McClelland's next great success came with Henry of Navarre. Purchased as a yearling, McClelland trained the colt to six wins in ten starts at age two, then to nine straight wins at age three and 1894 American Horse of the Year honors. Henry of Navarre's 1894 triumphs included the Belmont Stakes and Travers Stakes. Wealthy horse owners such as Pierre Lorillard IV made numerous attempts to buy the horse and in August 1895 McClelland accepted an offer of $25,000 from August Belmont Jr. Following its formation, Henry of Navarre was inducted in the National Museum of Racing and Hall of Fame in 1985.

When McClelland sold Henry of Navarre, the shrewd horseman had already bought Halma as a yearling and in 1895 the colt won the Kentucky Derby and the Phoenix Hotel Stakes. After the colt won the Clark Handicap, McClelland sold him for a reported $25,000 to the wealthy yeast manufacturer, Charles Fleischmann.

Now a wealthy man, as a sideline from his horse racing business, in December 1895 Byron McClelland founded and was first president of a newspaper he named The Evening Argonaut.

In 1896, Byron McClelland completed his wins in each of what later became the U.S. Triple Crown series by capturing the Preakness Stakes. Held that year at the Gravesend Race Track, in Brooklyn, New York, his Preakness win came as the trainer of Margrave for owner August Belmont, Jr.'s Blemton Stable.

The State of New Jersey enacted legislation in 1894 which banned betting, resulting in closure of state's racetracks. Pressure from anti-gambling groups and politicians then mounted to implement the same laws in New York state. The net effect was that racing stable owners began sending their horses to race in England. In its January 11, 1897 issue, the Chicago Daily Tribune reported that McClelland had entered horses in races at Newmarket Racecourse in England. One of the paper's headlines also read "Byron McClelland May Go to Europe with Some Youngsters in 1899." However, McClelland died of pneumonia at his Lexington home on June 11, 1897, and was interred in Lexington Cemetery. According to his obituary in The New York Times, he had an estimated wealth of $300–500,000.

On July 3, 1898, The New York Times further reported that a $10,000 sarcophagus had been constructed on his grave. Earlier, a June 27, 1889, issue of the Chicago Daily Tribune about McClelland's success in racing in Chicago and elsewhere also mentioned his character saying he "is a good natured little fellow who possessed a big heart and a lot of friends."

For a few years after his death, McClelland's widow and her brother, John D. Smith, continued racing horses. Sallie McClelland died in 1911 and is buried next to her husband in Lexington Cemetery.
