= William Blenkiron =

British horse trainer (1806-1871)

William Blenkiron (c. 1807 – 25 September 1871) was an English breeder of racehorses.

Blenkiron was born in Marrick, Richmond, Yorkshire, about 1807. He was originally brought up as a farmer, but he abandoned that pursuit, and moved to London in 1834, and began business as a general agent in Cheapside. In 1845, he added to his establishment a manufactory of stocks and collars, and three years later retired in favour of his son.

Blenkiron always desired to be the owner of a racehorse, and in 1847, while residing at Dalston, he purchased a mare named Glance. She was by Venison out of Eyebrow, by Whisker, one of Lord George Bentinck's breeding. In course of time she bore a colt, Young Beverlac, which ran at race meetings with moderate success. The colt was afterwards exchanged for three mares, and these formed the commencement of a stud destined to become the most celebrated of any establishment of horses in Europe.

About 1852, Blenkiron, wanting more room, moved from Dalston to Middle Park, Kent. He brought with him seven or eight brood mares, and Neasham, the head of the list of Eltham sires. The establishment now rapidly increased, until it was augmented to upwards of two hundred of the highest class and best mares that money and experience could produce. Kingston, Touchstone, Birdcatcher, and Newminster were the four cornerstones of his extensive stud, and it was to the first of these that he, to a great extent, owed his success as a breeder; for that horse was the sire of Caractacus, who was perhaps the most sensational Derby winner on record.

As a breeder of stock he had few equals in the matter of judgement, and no superior in the extent of his dealings. Whenever he desired to buy either brood mares or stallions, it was not of the least use to oppose him at an auction sale. Amongst his very numerous purchases he gave 3,000 guineas for Kingston, 5,000 guineas for Blink Bonny, 5,800 guineas for Gladiateur, 2,000 guineas for Rosa Bonheur, and 5,000 guineas for Blair Athol. The horses were pastured and stabled at his three establishments at Middle Park, Waltham Cross, and Esher.

He was never satisfied unless he was constantly weeding and improving his stock. The annual sales of stock at Middle Park drew together all connected with the turf, not only in England, but from France and other countries. Middle Park was then the largest breeding stud that any country ever saw, and considered one of the sights of England. After 1866 it was found necessary to hold two annual sales to dispose of the increase in the stock.

Blenkiron bred Hermit, the Derby winner in 1867, and Gamos, which won the Oaks in 1870. These stud farms paid their proprietor a handsome return on his outlay during his lifetime, and his liberality was shown in many ways, conspicuously, however, in his founding the great two-year-old race at Newmarket, to which he contributed for some time 1,000l. a year.

He died at Middle Park 25 September 1871, in his sixty-fourth year, and was buried in Eltham churchyard 30 September.
