= Grover Fuller =

American jockey (1885–1928)

Grover Cleveland Fuller
Personal information
- Born: March 18, 1885 DeWitt, Iowa
- Died: May 25, 1928 (aged 43) Chicago, Illinois
- Resting place: Elmwood Cemetery, DeWitt, Iowa
- Occupation: Jockey

Horse racing career
- Sport: Horse racing

Major racing wins
- Adirondack Stakes (1903); Alabama Stakes (1903); Annual Champion Stakes (1903); Bayshore Stakes (1903); Belles Stakes (1903); Belmont Futurity Stakes (1903); Bouquet Stakes (1903); Bronx Highweight Handicap (1903); Champlain Handicap (1903); Dash Stakes (1903); Dolphin Stakes (1903); Excelsior Handicap (1903); Fashion Stakes (1903); First Special Stakes (1903); Saratoga Cup (1903); Second Special Stakes (1903); Flatbush Stakes (1903); Gentilly Handicap (1903); Golden Rod Stakes (1903); Grand Union Hotel Stakes (1903); Jerome Stakes (1903); Junior Champion Stakes (1903); Mohawk Stakes (1903); Nassau Stakes (1903); Twin City Handicap (1903); American Derby (1904); Carnival Stakes (1904); Louisiana Derby (1904); Montague Stakes (1904); Rosedale Stakes (1904); Ascot Cup (1905); Ascot Handicap (1905)

Racing awards
- United States Champion Jockey by wins (1903)

Significant horses
- Africander, Eugenia Burch, Hamburg Belle, Highball, McChesney, Race King

Grover Cleveland Fuller (March 18, 1885 – May 25, 1928) was an American champion jockey in Thoroughbred horse racing. In 1903 he won the national riding title, a part of which were victories in the Futurity Stakes and the Suburban Handicap at Sheepshead Bay, New York, the two richest and most prestigious horse races in the United States at that time.
