= Sir John (horse) =

American-bred Thoroughbred racehorse

- Sire: Sir Modred
- Grandsire: Traducer
- Dam: Marian
- Damsire: Hubbard
- Sex: Stallion
- Foaled: 1887
- Country: United States
- Color: Bay
- Breeder: James B. A. Haggin
- Owner: Dwyer Brothers Stable
- Trainer: Frank McCabe
- Earnings: US$

Major wins
- Spindrift Stakes (1890); Travers Stakes (1890); Fort Schuyler Stakes (1891); Myrtle Stakes (1891); Parkway Handicap (1891)

Sir John (foaled 1887) was an American Thoroughbred racehorse who won the prestigious Travers Stakes in 1890 and who set a track record in 1891 for a mile and five-sixteenths on dirt at New York's Morris Park Racecourse.

Sir John's dam was the California-bred mare Marian and his sire was Sir Modred, a New Zealand-bred stallion that won several top races in New Zealand and Australia before being sold to American James B. A. Haggin. Brought to stand at stud at Haggin's Rancho Del Paso in California, Sir Modred would be the Leading sire in North America in 1894.

Trained by future U.S. Racing Hall of Fame inductee Frank McCabe, Sir John's win in the Travers Stakes was the third for his trainer and the fifth for owners the Dwyer Brothers Stable. Sir John's time of 2:09 4/5 in winning the mile and one-quarter Spindrift Stakes remained as the race's fastest.
