= V. Vivaudou =

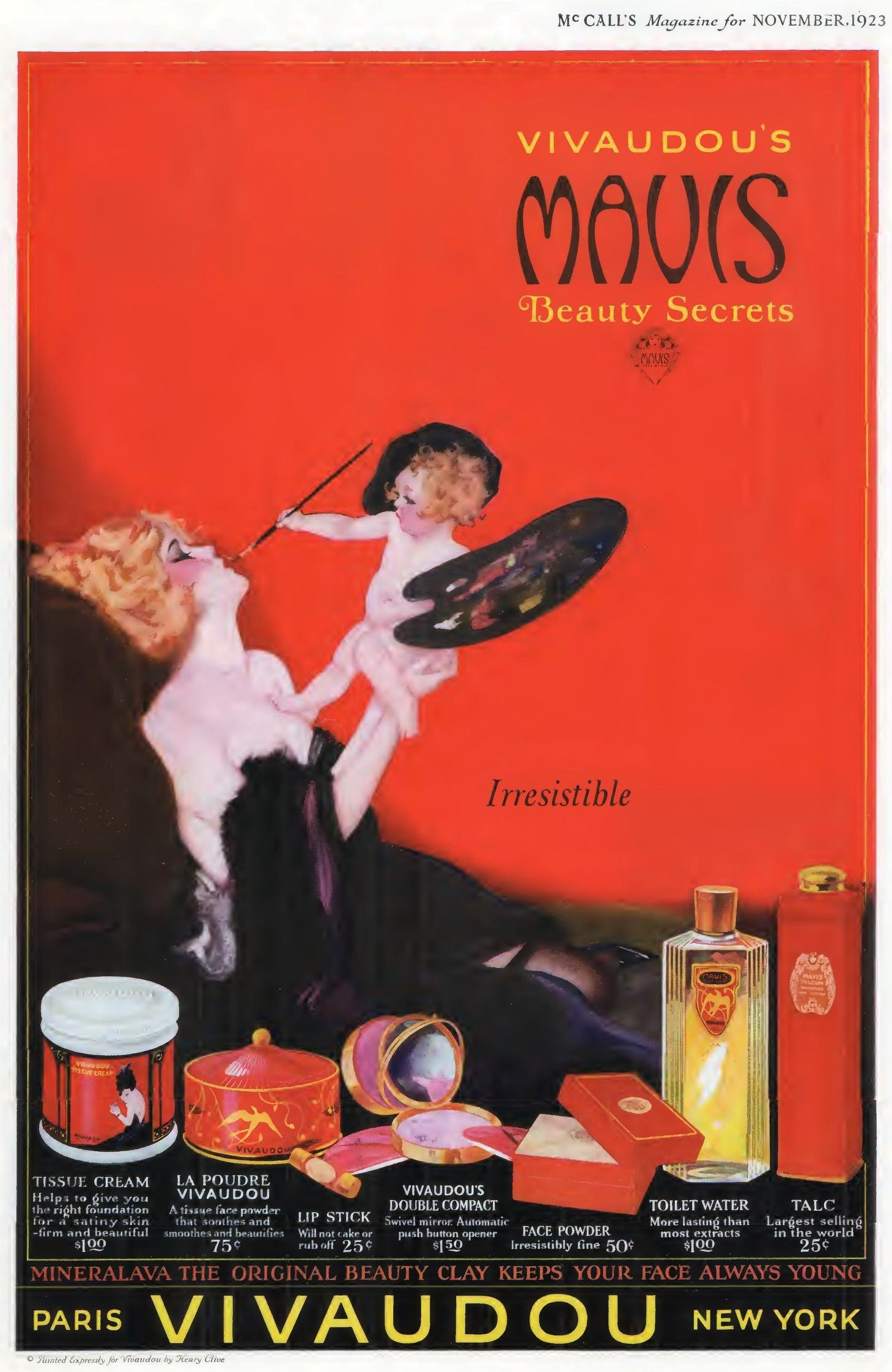
1923 advertisement, painted by Henry Cline

V. Vivaudou Inc., was an American perfume manufacturer that operated in New York City. V. Vivaudou Inc., was taken over by the United Drug Company in February 1916, for a price of $1,500,000. Among its perfume and cosmetics line, Mavis Talcum Vivaudou red tin was quite often part of the women's toiletries checklist. In August 1919 the United Drug Company sold V. Vivaudou Inc., to a syndicate of New York City men for $2,500,000. In 1920, it was considered one of the world's largest manufacturers of toiletries.

The business signed to carry out the sale and distribution of Alcorub on the Pacific Coast, in September 1922. In January 1926 the firm approved a contract to acquire the Alfred H. Smith Company. In May 1930 V. Vivaudou Inc., was ordered by the Federal Trade Commission to divest itself of capital stock in Parfumerie Melba, Inc., and the Alfred H. Smith Company. The FTC ruled that the companies were formerly competitors of V. Vivaudou Inc, and its acquisition of their stock constituted a monopoly. The order to divest was reversed by a United States Court of Appeals in November 1931. The court decided that the three companies' control of 6% of the United States cosmetics market did not constitute a monopoly.

== Business history ==
Victor Vivaudou, the owner, was born in Cannes, France, on January 2, 1881. He travelled to the US with his mistress Rosa on the Lusitania on September 12, 1914, setting up V. Vivaudou Inc. in the Times building in 1915. He and three other investors also founded Meridian Motors, a Manhattan autos and appurtenances company, which was chartered in January 1917.

A new company was incorporated with V. Vivaudou as its president in September 1919. An underwriting syndicate was formed headed by J. S. Bache & Co. and S. M. Schatzkin. The underwriting syndicate was dissolved in mid-September 1919.

The corporation had an initial capital outlay of $12,000, and maintained its headquarters at the New York Times Building.

V. Vivaudou Inc. was listed on the New York Stock Exchange beginning on May 5, 1920. It issued 300,000 shares of capital stock. Company stockholders approved an increase of common stock from 340,000 to 500,000 shares on January 5, 1926. The shares were changed from $10 to no par value. They agreed to an issuance of 25,000 shares of 7 per cent preferred stock with $100 par value. In November 1920 V. Vivaudou, Inc., reduced its dividend from .50 to .25 per share to conserve cash, in order to meet expansion in the United States and Europe. It reported earnings of $288,430 for the quarter ending on October 31, 1920. The sum translated to $4 per share prior to accounting for taxes.

Victor Vivaudou pleaded guilty to smuggling before a United States federal judge in New York City, on November 1, 1920. Vivaudou and Rosa failed to declare a $10,000 necklace and a $500 diamond ring, which they purchased in France, in March 1920. Vivaudou was fined $5,000.

In November 1921 the corporation reported a decline in earnings. Its gross profit of $1,153,185 was below that of the previous year's $2,031,861. Gross sales amounted to $4,100,124. V. Vivaudou, Inc., announced a 60% increase in sales in the first quarter of 1922. In August 1922 the firm stated that it had paid off the last of its bank loans and was debt free. Net profit for 1922 was $592,947, and approximately $770,000 for the first ten months of 1923. By mid 1924 V. Vivadou Inc., reported a sharp decline in profits, largely due to losses incurred by its French subsidiaries. Victor Vivaudou was ousted as president of V. Vivaudou Inc., by Jules Bache and David Schulte following disputes over conspiracy and fraudulent misrepresentation.

== Vadsco subsidiary ==
By 1943 V. Vivaudou of Canada and California was a subsidiary of Vadsco Sales Corporation. Vadsco expanded during World War II through the growth of Kny-Scheerer, a subsidiary which manufactured surgical instruments. Vadsco subsidiaries also produced perfumes, talcum and other products.
