= Ion (horse) =

British Thoroughbred racehorse

- Sire: Cain
- Grandsire: Paulowitz
- Dam: Margaret
- Damsire: Edmund
- Sex: Stallion
- Foaled: 1835
- Country: Great Britain
- Colour: Bay
- Record: 12:3-5-3
- Last updated on 25 September 2023

Ion (1835 – 1858?) was a Thoroughbred racehorse and sire in Great Britain and France.

== Background ==
Ion was a bay horse. His sire was Cain, of which through his lineage continued the Sir Paul branch of the Sir Peter Teazle direct sire line. His dam was Margaret.

== Racing career ==
Ion, also known as "the unfortunate Ion", ran against top racehorses at mid-distances. He ran in twelve races, winning twice, with one walkover. He finished second five times, including the Epson Derby and St Leger Stakes.

1837 season

- 2nd in the July Stakes
- 2nd in the Chesterfield Stakes
- 1st in the Clearwell Stakes
- 3rd in the Houghton Stakes

1838 season

- 2nd in the Epson Derby
- 2nd in the St Leger Stakes

1839 season

- 3rd in the Newmarket First Spring
- 4th in the Craven Stakes
- 1st in the Burgh Stakes (walkover)
- 1st in the Swinley Stakes
- 3rd in the Ascot Gold Cup
- 2nd in the Newmarket Second October

== Stud record ==
Though not a champion sire, Ion produced many winners in the second and third generations in Great Britain and France.

Great Britain

- Ionian (1841) - Chesterfield Stakes win
- Odd Mixture (1841) - sire of "excellent hunters"
- Iodine (1845) - July Stakes win
- Talfourd (1845) - Newmarket Handicap and Northhampton Cup wins
- Ione (1846) - descendants produced winners in Poland, South Africa, Japan, and France
- Tadmor (1846) - Goodwood's Ham Stakes, Column Stakes, Gratwick Produce Stakes, and Trienniel at Newmarket wins
- Iona (1849) - Coronation Stakes win
- Poodle (1849) - several wins between age 3 and age 8
- Dagobert (1850) - Chesterfield Stakes win
- Pelion (1850) - Eglinton Stakes and Marquis of Westminster Plate wins
- Baalbec (1851) - St James Palace Stakes win
- Varsoviana (1852) - produced winner Nemesis (1858)
- Wild Dayrell (1852) - Epsom Derby win

France

- Lady Tartuffe (1853) - produced Tartane (1871), winner of the Prix du Premier Pas
- Lion (1853) - Prix du Jockey Club, Grand St Leger Stakes, and Prix Special wins
- Monsieur Henry (1853) - Omnion, Prix du Trocadero, and Derby Continental at Gand wins
- Miss Ion (1853) - produced winning horses Beatrix (1861), Puebla (1863), Boulogne (1866), and Henry (1868)
- Mademmoiselle Marco (1854) - Derby de I'Ouest at Nantes and Poule d'Essai de I'Ouest at Poitiers wins
- Goelette (1855) - Prix d'Iffezheim at Baden-Baden win
- Narcissa (1855) - produced long-lived family lines in Poland and France
- Bakaloum (1856) - Poule d'Essai des Poulains win
- Calpurnia (1856) - produced winner Massinissa (1866)
- Sauvagine (1857) - produced winners through the stallion Dollar
- Violette (1857) - Poule des Produits win
- Finlande (1858) - Prix de la Foret, Prix de l'Empereor, and Prix de Diane wins
- Nice (1858) - produced winner Nubienne (1876)
- Somnambule (1858) - produced winner Sabre (1871)

== Sire line tree ==
- Ion
  - Ionian
  - Odd Mixture
  - Tadmor
    - Oberon
    - Alvediston
    - Manrico
    - The Gillie
    - A D Wagner
    - Foresight
  - Poodle
  - Dagobert
  - Pelion
  - Talfourd
  - Baalbec
  - Wild Dayrell
    - Buccaneer
      - Captain Kidd
      - Pirate Chief
      - Michael-De-Basco
      - Paul Jones
        - Paul's Cray
        - Gunboat
      - See Saw
        - Cradle
        - Discord
        - Cylinder
        - Master Waller
        - Bruce
        - Despair
        - Sortie
        - Acrostic
        - Little Duck
        - Castanet
        - Dog Rose
        - Loved One
        - Ocean Wave
        - Upset
        - Dazzle
      - Black Flag
      - Lopez
      - Ventnor
      - Brigand
      - Cadet
      - Flibustier
        - Tschungatai
        - Trachenberg
        - Architekt
        - Fledermaus
        - Freimaurer
      - Falscapa
      - Gamecock
      - Young Buccaneer
      - Waisenknabe
        - Lehetetian
        - Stronzian
      - Kisber
        - Kinsky
        - Crafton
        - Ducat
        - Harmattan
        - Hungarian
        - Arcadian
        - Kaunitz
        - Sennor
        - Hardenberg
        - Realist
        - Ausmarker
        - Sperber
        - Asche
        - Trollhetta
        - Undolf
        - Steinbock
        - Altgold
        - Sperber's Bruder
        - Imm
      - Bibor
      - Good Hope
        - Good Boy
        - Tambour-Major
      - Good Morning
      - Vordermann
      - Pirat
      - Tallos
      - Kisber-Ocscse
        - Inaska
      - Nil Desperandum
      - Picklock
      - Elemer
      - Florian
      - Balvany
        - Kozma
      - Landlord
      - Vederemo
      - Grand Buccaneer
      - Vinea
      - Fenek
      - Talpra Magyar
        - Tokio
        - Xamete
    - Horror
    - Dusk
    - Investment
    - Gladstone
    - Sea King
    - Robin Hood
    - Harllington
    - The Rake
      - Scamp
      - Constantine
      - Roscius
      - Pepper and Salt
        - Grey Leg
        - Cayenne
    - Wild Moor
    - Talk O' The Hill
      - Hero
      - Rapid Bay
      - Aldinga
      - Neckersgat
        - Dunlop
        - Portsea
        - Tarquin
      - Pride of the Hills
      - Don Carlos
    - Tregeagle
      - Imprudence
      - Tubal Cain
        - Coriolanus
        - Emir Bey
        - Precious Stone
        - Two Hearts
      - Ironmaster
      - Quintin Matsys
      - Turquoise
      - Metal
    - Wild Blood
    - Allbrook
    - Wild Oats
      - Wild Monarch
      - Juventus
      - Gozo
        - Gaulus
        - The Grafter
    - Guy Dayrell
    - Montargis
  - Lion
  - Monsieur Henry
  - Bakaloum

== Pedigree ==
Pedigree of Ion (GB), bay stallion, 1835
Sire Cain b. 1822	Paulowitz br. 1813	Sir Paul b. 1803	Sir Peter Teazle^
Sire Cain b. 1822	Paulowitz br. 1813	Sir Paul b. 1803	Pewett^
Sire Cain b. 1822	Paulowitz br. 1813	Evelina* br. 1791	Highflyer
Sire Cain b. 1822	Paulowitz br. 1813	Evelina* br. 1791	Termagant^
Sire Cain b. 1822	Paynator mare b. 1810	Paynator; 1791	Trumpator^
Sire Cain b. 1822	Paynator mare b. 1810	Paynator; 1791	Mark Anthony mare
Sire Cain b. 1822	Paynator mare b. 1810	Delpini mare 1805	Delpini
Sire Cain b. 1822	Paynator mare b. 1810	Delpini mare 1805	Young Marske mare
Dam Margaret b. 1831	Edmund b. 1824	Orville; 1799	Beningbrough
Dam Margaret b. 1831	Edmund b. 1824	Orville; 1799	Evelina*
Dam Margaret b. 1831	Edmund b. 1824	Emmeline; 1817	Waxy
Dam Margaret b. 1831	Edmund b. 1824	Emmeline; 1817	Sorcery^
Dam Margaret b. 1831	Medora ch. 1811	Selim; 1802	Buzzard
Dam Margaret b. 1831	Medora ch. 1811	Selim; 1802	Alexander mare
Dam Margaret b. 1831	Medora ch. 1811	Sir Harry mare 1803	Sir Harry^
Dam Margaret b. 1831	Medora ch. 1811	Sir Harry mare 1803	Volunteer mare

* Ion is inbred 3S x 4D to the mare Evelina, meaning that she appears third generation on the sire side of his pedigree and fourth generation on the dam side of his pedigree.

^ Ion is inbred 4S x 5D to the stallion Sir Peter Teazle, meaning that he appears fourth generation on the sire side of his pedigree and fifth generation (via Sir Harry) on the dam side of his pedigree.

^ Ion is inbred 5S x 4S to the mare Termagant, meaning that she appears and fifth generation (via Pewett) and fourth generation on the sire side of his pedigree.

^ Ion is inbred 4S x 6D to the stallion Trumpator, meaning that he appears fourth generation on the sire side of his pedigree and sixth generation (via Sorcery) on the dam side of his pedigree.
