= Henry of Navarre (horse) =

American-bred Thoroughbred racehorse

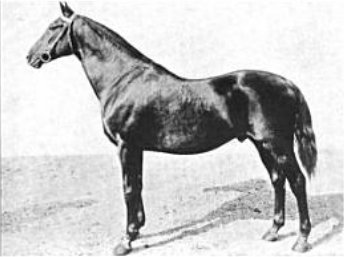
- circa 1912-1917
- Sire: Knight of Ellerslie
- Grandsire: Eolus
- Dam: Moss Rose
- Damsire: The Ill-Used
- Sex: Stallion
- Foaled: 1891
- Country: USA
- Colour: Chestnut
- Breeder: Lucien O. Appleby
- Owner: Byron McClelland; August Belmont Jr. at age 4 & 5
- Trainer: Byron McClelland; John Hyland
- Record: 42: 29-8-3
- Earnings: $68,985

Major wins
- Dash Stakes (1893); Golden Rod Stakes (1893); Spindrift Stakes (1894); Travers Stakes (1894); First Special Stakes (1895); Manhattan Handicap (1895); Municipal Handicap (1895); Suburban Handicap (1896) American Classics race wins: Belmont Stakes (1894)

Awards
- American Horse of the Year (1894, 1895) American Champion 3-Year-Old Male Horse (1894)

Honours
- United States Racing Hall of Fame (1985)

Henry of Navarre (1891–1917) was an American Hall of Fame Thoroughbred Champion racehorse.

== Background ==
Henry of Navarre was sired by the 1884 Preakness Stakes winner Knight of Ellerslie he was named for the Huguenot king, Henry IV of France. He was purchased by trainer Byron McClelland.

== Racing career ==
At age three Henry of Navarre won nine races in a row including the Belmont Stakes, in which he defeated another future Hall of Fame colt, Domino, who had beaten him in the Withers Stakes. After winning the Travers Stakes, his handlers and James R. Keene, owner of Domino, agreed to a match race in which the horses ended up in a dead heat. As such, they met again three weeks later in a race to determine the 1894 championship. For this championship event, the 4-year-old Clifford joined the two younger colts. Henry of Navarre beat his rivals by 3/4 length, earning Horse of the Year honors.

In 1895 McLelland offered to match Henry of Navarre against any horse in the world over one mile for any sum from $5,000 to $25,000 at weight-for-age.

Sold later in 1895 to prominent horseman August Belmont Jr., Henry of Navarre repeated as the U.S. Champion under future Hall of Fame trainer John Hyland. At age six, he was retired after winning the Suburban Handicap.

== Stud career ==
Retired to stand at stud in France he met with little success and in 1911, along with several other horses, was donated to the U.S. Army Remount Service to help establish a national breeding program at the Front Royal, Virginia depot.

In 1985, Henry of Navarre was posthumously inducted into the National Museum of Racing and Hall of Fame. A painting by Gene Smith of Henry of Navarre in his 1894 match race against Domino can be seen at the Museum.
