= Purse distribution =

In a horse race, the distribution of winnings among the highest finishers

In horse racing, the term purse distribution may refer to the total amount of money paid out to the owners of horses racing at a particular track over a given period of time, or to the percentages of a race's total purse that are awarded to each of the highest finishers. This article focuses on the latter definition.

== Background ==
Prior to the 1970s, only the owners of the first four finishers in a horse race in the United States typically received any money at all. In Thoroughbred racing, it was common for 65% of the race's purse was awarded to the winner, with the second, third and fourth horses earning 20%, 10% and 5% respectively. This procedure had some drawbacks, especially in the event of inclement weather — owners would often seek to "scratch," or withdraw their horses from a race, if the track was wet, and even more so if rain forced a scheduled turf, or grass race, to be moved to the main, or dirt, track. It was largely in an effort to encourage larger fields in these circumstances that many American state racing associations began changing their purse-distribution formats during the last three decades of the 20th century.

One frequently-implemented reform was to include horses finishing fifth in the purse distribution; the method most often employed for doing this was to award 60% of the purse to the winner, 20% to second, 11% to third, 6% to fourth and 3% to fifth, a format still observed by many tracks today. Some tracks even went so far as to include the sixth-place runner in the purse as well; most often, this resulted in 60% being given to the winner, 20% to second, 10% to third, 5% to fourth, 3% to fifth and 2% to sixth.

In 1975, the state of Florida enacted a purse-distribution format that has had revolutionary implications for the sport of horse racing in the United States: Its adopted plan provided 1% of the purse to all finishers in the race lower than fourth; this meant that the percentages paid out to the horses finishing second, third and fourth (but not first) became variable, depending upon the size of the field. For example, if a race had twelve starters, 60% of the purse went to the winner, 18% to second, 10% to third, 4% to fourth and 1% each to fifth through twelfth; with only six starters the winner received the same 60%, but 20% went to second, 13% to third, 5% to fourth and 1% each to fifth and sixth. This system is still in use at all of the state's thoroughbred tracks today, although a slight modification in the actual percentages (resulting in the second-place share being increased at the expense of the third and/or fourth) was made in 2005.

Some tracks have taken to awarding less than 1% to each unplaced finisher, especially those tracks at which the purses have been greatly enhanced due to revenue from affiliated casinos, which may or may not be on the premises of the track itself — since in that case the smaller percentage is adequate to cover the fee to which the jockey is entitled, which can be up to $100.

The popularity of Florida's new format among horse owners led to calls for it or something similar to be adopted in other states as well, and as the 20th Century neared its end many states had indeed followed Florida's example, although the specific percentages varied somewhat from one state to the next. New York State long resisted this trend, although in 1971 that state had reduced the winner's share from 65% to 60%, awarding 22% to second, 12% to third and 6% to fourth. Finally, in December 1994 the New York Racing Association included horses finishing fifth in its purse awards for the first time (changing to the 60-20-11-6-3 format referred to above) and in December 2003 expanded its purse awards to all finishers, allocating the same 60% to the winner, but 20% to second, 10% to third, 5% to fourth, 3% to fifth and the remaining 2% to be divided equally among the other finishers. These percentages change to 55-20-12-6-4-3 with the opening of the Saratoga meeting on July 20, 2018.

== Current practice ==
In some racing jurisdictions, a "starter's bonus" is paid to horses not among the top finishers in a race; this bonus is added to the stated value of the purse, and therefore nothing needs to be subtracted from the top shares to provide it. California uses this approach, paying a starter's bonus of $400 to each horse placed worse than fifth at its Los Angeles-area tracks and $300 at the tracks located in the northern part of the state. Such bonuses are also the rule in Delaware, Pennsylvania, and Texas.

Of the 33 American states that conducted thoroughbred racing in 2014, for example, purse money was paid to all horses in 20 of them, while 10 did not do so (with eight of these paying the first five finishers), and in the remaining three states some of the state's racetracks awarded money to every horse and others did not. Various schemes were employed in Canada, with Woodbine Racetrack, the nation's largest and most prestigious racetrack, paying starter's bonuses to all horses not among the first five to finish (later the first eight in stakes races).

Starting in 2005 the Kentucky Derby included the fifth-place finisher in its purse distribution; from 1915 through 2004 only the first four finishers (and only the first three in most years prior to 1915) in the Derby received purse money. In 2014 the New York Racing Association began paying out purse money to the first eight finishers not only in the Belmont Stakes but also in many other major stakes races. The Breeders' Cup made a change along these lines in 2016, increasing the number of purse-earning runners from five to eight, the sixth-, seventh-, and eighth-place finishers each receiving 1% of the purse.

Australia has also adopted American-style innovations in dividing its purses in thoroughbred horse races, paying the top eight finishers at some tracks and even ten at others, with the awards for 6th through 8th (or 6th through 10th) the same regardless of the actual placing within that segment — sometimes 1% each, other times a fixed dollar amount. In the Melbourne Cup, each horse placing 6th through 10th receives approximately 2% of the total purse. In addition, virtually all Australian thoroughbred tracks pay out a starter's bonus — known in that country as a "Starter Subsidy" — to horses which do not finish in the top eight or ten (or the top four or five at tracks which do not pay regular purse money further down than those places).

The practice of paying at least some purse money to unplaced horses has not yet spread to European racing jurisdictions, however.

== Bonuses and added money ==
Currently, most North American purses are shown as a lump sum of guaranteed money: for example, the purse of the Kentucky Derby was increased to $3,000,000 guaranteed in 2019. The purse distribution is typically applied to this guaranteed amount. However, some purses may include a bonus, for example for state-bred winners, which is only payable to horses that meet the bonus condition. If the condition is not met, the total amount paid out may be lower than the stated purse. Alternately, a bonus may be shown as an addition to the purse. For example, in the 2004 Kentucky Derby, Smarty Jones earned a $5 million bonus on top of his share of the regular purse distribution, resulting in what was then a record winnings of $5.8 million.

In the case of the Breeders' Cup, the current purse structure includes an 8% travel allowance, which covers travel expenses for out-of-state competitors that have won a designated Breeders' Cup Challenge race earlier in the year. Thus the value of the race is 92% of the purse.

Added money refers to situations where the value of the race is increased by some or all of the entry fees. This includes nomination fees, which are required in advance of the event, and starter fees, which are payable at the time the event is held. All such added money is paid to the winning horse's owner in addition to the regular purse distribution. In the past, added money was a more significant portion of the winnings of major races, and increased the disparity between the amounts paid to the first place horse and the second. To illustrate the impact, the Kentucky Derby's purse was changed from an added money basis to a guaranteed basis in 1996. Churchill Downs paid some added money on top of the guaranteed amount in 1996 due to a large field, but not in 1997. The result was as follows:

Year	Purse	Value of race	1st place earnings	2nd place earnings	Ref
1995	$500,000 added	$957,400	$707,400	$145,000	
1996	$1,000,000 guaranteed	$1,169,800	$869,800	$170,000	
1997	$1,000,000 guaranteed	$1,000,000	$700,000	$170,000	
