= Kilwarlin =

British-bred Thoroughbred racehorse

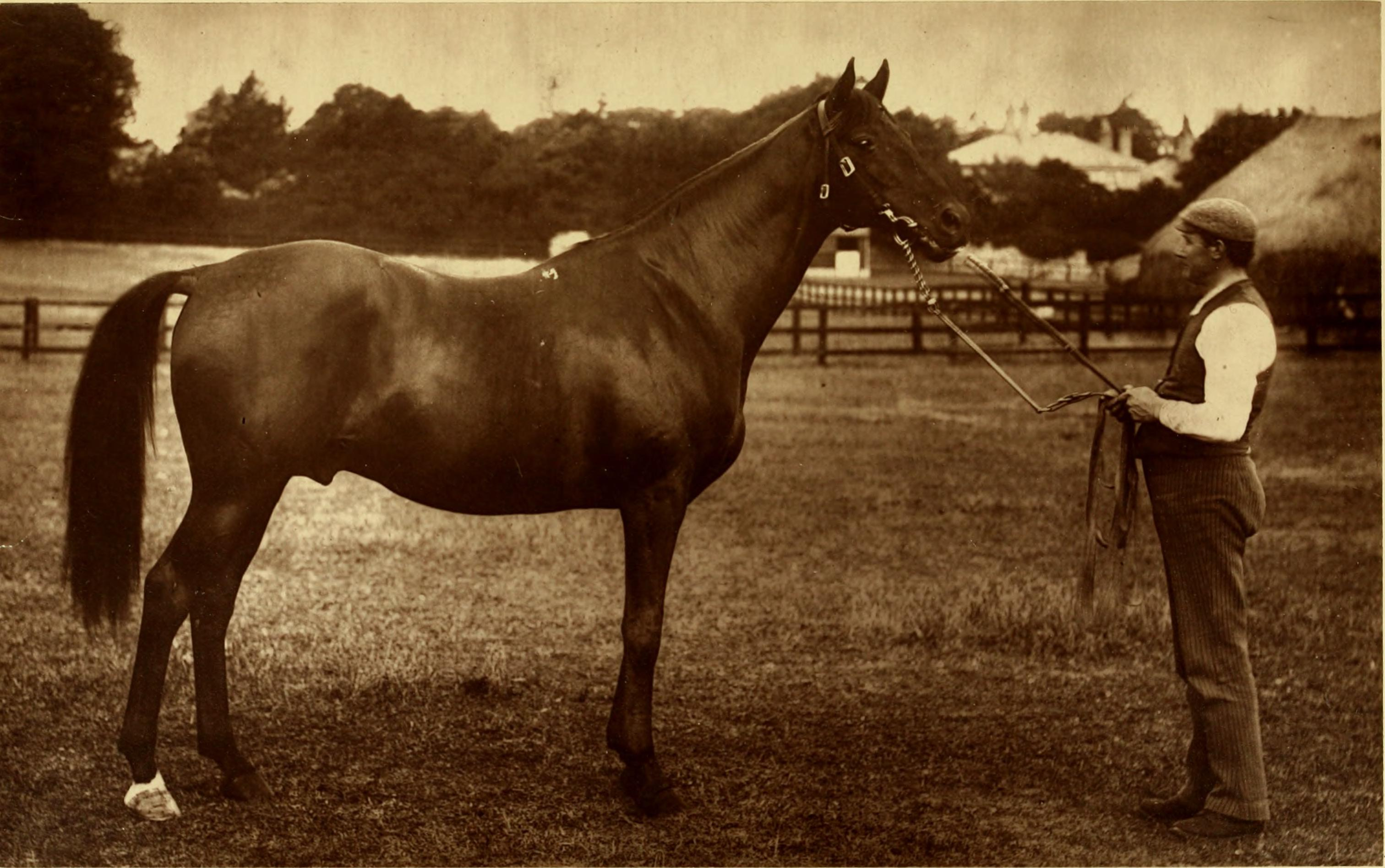
- Sire: Arbitrator
- Grandsire: Solon
- Dam: Hasty Girl
- Damsire: Lord Gough
- Sex: Stallion
- Foaled: 1884
- Country: United Kingdom
- Colour: Brown
- Breeder: J. Connolly
- Owner: J. Connolly "C L Blake" "M McKenna"; Captain Machell; George Rodney, 7th Baron Rodney
- Trainer: James Jewitt
- Record: 9: 5-3-0
- Earnings: £6,546

Major wins
- St Leger (1887); Challenge Stakes (1887)

Kilwarlin (1884 – 1900) was a British Thoroughbred racehorse and sire. The detail of his ownership were complicated and led to complaints being lodged with the Jockey Club. He showed considerable promise as a juvenile in 1886 when he won his first two races before being upset at odds of 1/20 in the Bretby Stakes. In the following year he ran unplaced in the Great Jubilee Stakes and then ran three times at Royal Ascot, winning a Biennial Stakes and finishing second in both the Queen's Stand Stakes and the Rous Memorial Stakes (to Ormonde). In autumn he started favourite for the St Leger and won a controversial race despite being left more than 100 yards behind his rivals at the start. After his retirement from racing he became a successful breeding stallion.

== Background ==
Kilwarlin was a brown horse bred at the Curragh, County Kildare in Ireland (then part of the United Kingdom) by J. Connolly. During his racing career he was initially owned by Captain Machell who was described as "one of the most astute racing men to be found either in England or out of it" and was trained by James Jewitt. Machell typically managed the strategy of his horses' careers while Jewitt took care of their day-to-day conditioning. The details of Machell's acquisition of the horse were unclear but it was reported that he had paid approximately 1,000 guineas. Physically, Kilwarlin was described as "a remarkably good looking horse" and a "grand mover".

He was sired by Arbitrator, whose biggest wins came in handicap races, was a representative of the Godolphin Arabian sire line. Kilwarlin's dam Hasty Girl had previously produced the Eclipse Stakes winner Bendigo.

== Racing career ==
=== 1886: two-year-old season ===
Kilwarlin had shown impressive form in training and was highly regarded before he appeared on a racecourse. He made a successful debut in summer when he was an easy winner of the Wynyard Plate at Stockton Racecourse at odds of 1/3. He followed up shortly afterwards by winning the Harrington Stakes. At Newmarket Racecourse in October Kilwarlin started 1/20 favourite for the Bretby Stakes but was beaten by the filly Reve d'Or. His defeat looked more excusable when Reve d'Or defeated Enterprise to win the Dewhurst Plate.

Kilwarlin ended the year with earnings of £1,456.

=== 1887: three-year-old season ===
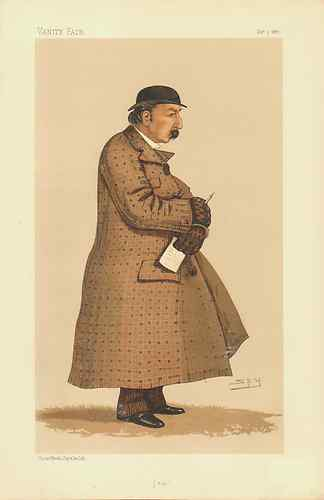
Captain James Machell, who managed Kilwarlin's racing career

Kilwarlin began his second campaign by being matched against older horses in the Great Jubilee Handicap over one mile at Kempton Park Racecourse on 7 May. After racing just behind the leaders he swerved entering the straight, lost his position, and finished eleventh in a race won by his older half-brother Bendigo. At Royal Ascot in June he was matched against the 1886 English Triple Crown winner Ormonde in the Rous Memorial Stakes and finished second, beaten six lengths by his older rival. At the same meeting he finished second to the two-year-old Crowberry in the Queen's Stand Stakes over five furlongs and won the New Biennial Plate.

In August Kilwarlin was sold for a reported 7,000 guineas by Machell to George Bridges Harley Dennett Rodney, 7th Baron Rodney. Lord Rodney had inherited a considerable fortune which he exhausted on bloodstock and gambling.

On 14 September, at Doncaster Racecourse Kilwarlin was moved up in distance to contest the 112th running of the St Leger over fourteen and half furlongs and despite what was described as "wretched" weather the race attracted its customary large crowd. Ridden by Jack Robinson he was made the 4/1 favourite ahead of Eiridspord while the best fancied of the other runners were Merry Hampton (winner of the Epsom Derby), Scottish King and Phil (runner-up in the 2000 Guineas). Doubts had been expressed about the colt's effectiveness over the distance with the Sporting Life opining that a sprinter had as much chance of winning the Leger as a snail had of winning the Stewards' Cup. He did however attract considerable support from the large Irish contingent: according to one report a "man of knowledge" claimed that "all Ireland was on". Kilwarlin was unruly in the paddock and Robinson opted to abandon the colt's participation in the parade in front of the stands as his behaviour deteriorated. On arrival at the start the colt bucked, kicked and refused to line alongside the others. When the flag fell to start the contest Kilwarlin "dug his toes in" and refused to race, and the other runners had covered at least 100 yards before Robinson persuaded him to take part. However, the early pace was so slow that he was eventually able to join the main group without Robinson having to rush him. After moving into contention on the final turn, Kilwarlin took the lead a quarter mile from the finish but was immediately challenged by Merry Hampton and Timothy. After what was described as a "ding dong" struggle and one of the best finishes even seen at Doncaster, Kilwarlin prevailed by half a length from the Derby winner, with Timothy a head away in third place. Lord Rodney rewarded Robinson for his winning ride with a gift of£500. The result produced some controversy as Robinson's rival jockeys were criticised for allowing the favourite back into the race instead of setting a faster pace which would have eliminated Kilwarlin from contention.

In autumn Kilwarlin was beaten in a "private" trial race by his stablemate Humewood, but the form of the trial seemed less disappointing when Humewood defeated a strong field to win the Cesarewitch. At Newmarket in October, Kilwarlin was dropped back in distance and won the Challenge Stakes over seven furlongs at odds of 1/3.

Kilwarlin's winnings in 1887 came to £5,090.

At the end of the year an objection was raised by Merry Hampton's owner "Mr Abington" to Kilwarlin's St Leger victory on the grounds that he had been entered by his breeder, Mr Connolly who was on the "forfeit list" for failing to honour financial commitments. It was further alleged that the details of the horse's ownership had been falsified to conceal Connolly's involvement by a complicated series of transactions involving a "Mr McKenna" and a "C L Blake". Despite the charges Kilwarlin was allowed to keep the race.

== Stud record ==
After the end of his racing career Kilwarlin was sold in order to settle Lord Rodney's debts and retired to become a breeding stallion. His best runners included Kilcock (won King's Stand Stakes (twice), Wokingham Stakes, Challenge Stakes (twice) and July Cup), Kroonstad (Ascot Derby), Hebron (Wokingham Stakes), Ogden (Belmont Futurity Stakes), Longford Lad (Grand International d'Ostende), Cherry Picker, (second Eclipse Stakes) and Sabrinetta (second in the Oaks Stakes). He was also the damsire of Glenside (Grand National), St Ninian (Chester Vase) and Samsam (Prix Daru).

Several other daughters of Kilwarlin made a lasting impact as broodmares:

- Kilmorna was the female-line ancestor of Native River and the Irish 1000 Guineas winner Milady Rose.
- Lisdowney, was the female line ancestor of Valdina Myth (Kentucky Oaks)
- Navaretta, was a very influential broodmare whose descendants have included Known Fact, Round Table, Pebbles, Nashwan and Deep Impact.

Kilwarlin died in October 1900 of an intestinal rupture.

== Sire line tree ==
- Kilwarlin
  - Hebron
  - Kilcock
  - Ogden
    - Belmere
    - Fayette
    - Sir Martin
      - Joy Smoke
      - Star Lore
      - Healy
      - Spinach
    - Paris
    - The Finn
      - Kai-Sang
        - Mei Foo
        - Kai-Feng
        - Kai-Finn
        - Repaid
      - Bud Lerner
        - Mokatam
        - Thanksgiving
      - Zev
        - Zevson
      - Flying Ebony
        - Flying Heels
        - Dark Secret
        - Vicar
      - Finite
    - Captain Alcock
  - Cherry Picker
  - Longford Lad
  - Kroonstad

== Pedigree ==
Pedigree of Kilwarlin (GB), brown stallion, 1884
Sire Arbitrator (IRE) 1874	Solon; 1861	West Australian (GB)	Melbourne
Sire Arbitrator (IRE) 1874	Solon; 1861	West Australian (GB)	Mowerina
Sire Arbitrator (IRE) 1874	Solon; 1861	Birdcatcher mare	Birdcatcher
Sire Arbitrator (IRE) 1874	Solon; 1861	Birdcatcher mare	Hetman Platoff mare
Sire Arbitrator (IRE) 1874	True Heart (GB); 1864	Musjid	Newminster
Sire Arbitrator (IRE) 1874	True Heart (GB); 1864	Musjid	Peggy
Sire Arbitrator (IRE) 1874	True Heart (GB); 1864	Mary Jane	Pompey
Sire Arbitrator (IRE) 1874	True Heart (GB); 1864	Mary Jane	Ratafia
Dam Hasty Girl (IRE) 1875	Lord Gough (GB); 1869	Gladiateur (FR)	Monarque
Dam Hasty Girl (IRE) 1875	Lord Gough (GB); 1869	Gladiateur (FR)	Miss Gladiator
Dam Hasty Girl (IRE) 1875	Lord Gough (GB); 1869	Battaglia	Rataplan
Dam Hasty Girl (IRE) 1875	Lord Gough (GB); 1869	Battaglia	Espoir
Dam Hasty Girl (IRE) 1875	Irritation (GB); 1862	King of Trumps	Velocipede
Dam Hasty Girl (IRE) 1875	Irritation (GB); 1862	King of Trumps	Mrs Gill
Dam Hasty Girl (IRE) 1875	Irritation (GB); 1862	Patience	Assault
Dam Hasty Girl (IRE) 1875	Irritation (GB); 1862	Patience	Newton Lass (Family 9-d)
