= Princess Doreen =

American-bred Thoroughbred racehorse

- Sire: Spanish Prince
- Grandsire: Ugly
- Dam: Lady Doreen
- Damsire: Ogden
- Sex: Mare
- Foaled: 1921
- Country: United States
- Colour: Bay
- Breeder: John E. Madden
- Owner: Audley Farm Stable; Bernard B. (B.B.) Jones & Montfort Jones
- Trainer: Kay Spence
- Record: 94 Starts: 34-15-17
- Earnings: $174,745

Major wins
- Kentucky Oaks (1924); Falls City Handicap (1924); Coaching Club American Oaks (1924); Labor Day Handicap (1924); Covington Handicap (1924); Latonia Independence Handicap (1925, 1927); Bowie Handicap (1925); Cincinnati Enquirer Handicap (1925); Western Hills Handicap (1925); Latonia Autumn Handicap (1925); Cincinnati Times-Star Handicap (1925); Commercial-Tribune Handicap (1925); Covington Handicap (1925); Latonia Inaugural Handicap (1926); Saratoga Handicap (1926); Greater Chicago Handicap (1927)

Awards
- American Champion Three-Year-Old Filly (1924); Champion Female Handicap Horse (1925, 1926)

Honors
- U.S. Racing Hall of Fame (1982); Princess Doreen Drive in Lexington, Kentucky
- Last updated on December 15, 2007

Princess Doreen (1921–1952) was a Thoroughbred racehorse best known for being the top American female money-winner. After showing promising form as a two-year-old she improved to be the best female racehorse of her generation for the next three seasons. Not only did she race males and win, but she did so carrying high weight (often up to 133 pounds) for four years.

== Background ==
Princess Doreen was a bay mare bred by John E. Madden at his stud farm, Hamburg Place, in Kentucky. She was sired by Spanish Prince, a British horse which won several major sprint races between 1910 and 1913 including the King's Stand Stakes at Royal Ascot and two editions of the July Cup. Her dam, Lady Doreen, was of little account as a racehorse but had an excellent pedigree, being a half-sister to the Kentucky Derby winner Sir Barton and to Sir Martin a colt which won major races on both sides of the Atlantic.

Princess Doreen was trained by the former jockey Kay Spence; Spence said that Princess Doreen represented the pinnacle of his success.

== Racing career ==
At two, Princess Doreen placed in the Ft. Thomas Handicap, and came third in the Matron Stakes. In the following year she won the Kentucky Oaks, the Falls City Handicap, the Labor Day Handicap, the Covington Handicap, and the Coaching Club American Oaks, and placed in the Chicago Special, the Alabama Stakes, the Gadsden D. Bryan Memorial Handicap, the Latonia Oaks, and the Prince George Handicap. In October 1924, Princess Doreen participated in what was called the International Special, where three races would take place. The third race took place at the old Latonia Race Track in Covington, Kentucky for a purse of $50,000. Those racing included Chilhowee, Epinard, Mad Play, Sarazen. Princess Doreen was the lone filly of this group. Sarazen placed first, Epinard second, and Mad Play third.

As a four-year-old, Princess Doreen was successful in a series of major handicap races: she won the Independence Handicap, the Bowie Handicap, the Cincinnati Enquirer Handicap (under 129 pounds), the Western Hills Handicap (under 126 pounds), the Autumn Handicap (under 133 pounds), the Cincinnati Times-Star Handicap, the Commercial-Tribune Handicap, the Covington Handicap (for the second time, carrying 130 pounds). She placed in the Thanksgiving Handicap and showed in the Chicago Special, the Gadsden D. Bryan Memorial Handicap, the Grainger Memorial Handicap, the Flint Stone Memorial Handicap, the Pimlico Cup, the Hartford Handicap, the Enquirer Handicap, and the Inaugural Handicap.

At five Princess Doreen won the Inaugural Handicap and the Saratoga Handicap. In the Saratoga Handicap she beat two-time Horse of the Year, Sarazen. She placed in the Grainger Memorial Handicap, the Independence Handicap, the Bowie Handicap, the Pimlico Serial and was third in the Pimlico Cup and the Saratoga Cup. In her final season she won the Independence Handicap, placed in the Hotel Statler Handicap, and was third in the Lincoln Handicap and the Oak Park Handicap.

== Broodmare ==
Upon retiring, Princess Doreen was America's leading female money winner, toppling Miss Woodford's record. As a broodmare Princess Doreen produced eight foals, only one of whom won races; her daughter, Miss Doreen.

Princess Doreen died in 1952 at the age of 31.

== Assessment and honours ==
In a poll among members of the American Trainers Association, conducted in 1955 by Delaware Park Racetrack, Princess Doreen was voted the eighth greatest filly in American racing history (Gallorette being voted first).

Princess Doreen was elected to the National Museum of Racing and Hall of Fame in 1982
