= Seminole Handicap =

- Class: Discontinued stakes
- Location: Hialeah Park Race Track, Hialeah, Florida, United States
- Inaugurated: 1932
- Race type: Thoroughbred - Flat racing

Race information
- Distance: 1 1/8 miles (9 (Furlongs)
- Surface: Dirt
- Track: left-handed
- Qualification: Three-year-olds and up

The Seminole Handicap is a discontinued American Thoroughbred horse race first run as the Inaugural Handicap on the January 14, 1932 opening day of the newly constructed Hialeah Park Race Track in Hialeah, Florida. Shut down in 1926 as a result of its destruction by the Great Miami Hurricane, the racetrack property was bought and rebuilt by Joseph E. Widener.

Originally named the Inaugural Handicap and run at a distance of six furlongs, the race was created to be a featured event on the track's annual opening day of racing. The first winner was Flying Heels, a son of the 1925 Kentucky Derby winner Flying Ebony.

A guest of Joseph Widener on that opening day in 1932 was the Irish trainer Cecil Boyd-Rochfort whose career would include at least one win in each of the five British Classic Races as well as earning five British National training championships. Of the new Hialeah track facility, Boyd-Rochfort called it "the last word in race tracks and beauty."

Among the most notable winners of the Seminole were Citation in 1948, Kelso in 1963, and Forego in 1975. All three would become U.S. Racing Hall of Fame inductees.

Hialeah Park closed at the end of 2001 meaning that year's April 15 running of the Seminole Handicap was its last.
