= Great Trial Stakes =

- Class: Discontinued stakes
- Location: Belmont Park, Elmont, New York, United States; Sheepshead Bay Race Track; Sheepshead Bay, Brooklyn, New York, United States
- Inaugurated: 1891–1910, 1913
- Race type: Thoroughbred – Flat racing

Race information
- Distance: 6 furlongs (0.75 mi)
- Surface: Dirt
- Track: left-handed
- Qualification: Two-year-olds

The Great Trial Stakes was an American Thoroughbred horse race held annually at Sheepshead Bay Race Track in Sheepshead Bay, Brooklyn, New York from 1891 through 1910 and for 1913 at Belmont Park in Elmont, New York. Raced on dirt, it was run at a distance of 5¾ furlongs from 1891 through 1900 and then at 6 furlongs. Run in late June or early July, for most of its years at Sheepshead Bay the Great Trial Stakes was the most valuable race for two-year-olds during the track's summer meet.

== Historical notes ==
The Great Trial Stakes attracted the top two-year-olds including ten who would earn American Champion Two-Year-Old honors. Domino (1893), Commando (1900) and Colin (1907) won the race and would go on to be named that year's American Horse of the Year. It is such a rare feat for a two-year-old to earn Horse of the Year honors that from 1908 through 2018 it has been accomplished only four times:

- Native Dancer (1952)
- Moccasin (1965)
- Secretariat (1972)
- Favorite Trick (1997)

A July 1, 1908 Daily Racing Form article reported on the dominance of John Madden in this event who won this race seven times as the trainer and breeder plus he was the owner of five of those winners as well as a minority partner of 1903 winner Pulsus.

== The 1911–1912 statewide shutdown of horse racing ==
On June 11, 1908, the Republican-controlled New York Legislature under Governor Charles Evans Hughes passed the Hart–Agnew anti-betting legislation. The owners of Sheepshead Bay Race Track, and other racing facilities in New York State, struggled to stay in business without income from betting. Racetrack operators had no choice but to drastically reduce the purse money being paid out, which resulted in the Great Trial Stakes offering a purse in 1909 that was less than one-tenth of what it had been a year earlier. These small purses made horse racing unprofitable and impossible for even the most successful horse owners to continue in business. As such, for the 1910 racing season, management of the Sheepshead Bay facility dropped some of its minor stakes races and used the purse money to bolster its most important events. Even with additional funding, the Great Trial Stakes of 1910 was little more than one-third of what it had been in 1908.

In spite of strong opposition by prominent owners such as August Belmont, Jr. and Harry Payne Whitney, reform legislators were not happy when they learned that betting was still going on at racetracks between individuals, and they had further restrictive legislation passed by the New York Legislature in 1910. Recorded as the Executive Liability Act, the legislation made it possible for racetrack owners and members of its board of directors to be fined and imprisoned if anyone was found betting, even privately, anywhere on their premises. After a 1911 amendment to the law to limit the liability of owners and directors was defeated, every racetrack in New York State shut down. As a result, the Great Trial Stakes was not run in 1911 and 1912.

Owners, whose horses of racing age had nowhere to go, began sending them, their trainers and their jockeys to race in England and France. Many horses ended their racing careers there, and a number remained to become an important part of the European horse breeding industry. Thoroughbred Times reported that more than 1,500 American horses were sent overseas between 1908 and 1913, and of them at least 24 were either past, present, or future Champions. When a February 21, 1913 ruling by the New York Supreme Court, Appellate Division Court saw horse racing return in 1913, it was too late for the Sheepshead Bay horse racing facility, and it never reopened. However, the race was run for one final time at Belmont Park on June 30, 1913.

Great Trial Stakes winners who became the year's Champion Two-Year-Old:

- Blue Girl ( 1901)
- Colin (1907)
- Commando (1900)
- Dalmatian (1909)
- Domino (1893)
- Hamburg (1897)
- His Highness (1891)
- Irish Lad (1902)
- Jean Bereaud (1898)
- Sir Martin (1908)

Career Championships & honors of Great Trial Stakes winners:

Blue Girl:

- Co-Champion Two-Year-Old Female (1901)
- Champion Three-Year-Old Female (1902)

Colin:

- Champion Two-Year-Old Male (1907)
- Horse of the Year (1907, 1908)
- Champion Three-Year-Old Male (1908
- Racing Hall of Fame(1956)

Commando:

- Champion Two-Year-Old Male (1900)
- Horse of the Year (1900, 1901)
- Champion Three-Year-Old Male (1901)
- Leading sire in North America (1907)
- Racing Hall of Fame (1956)

Domino:

- Champion Two-Year-Old Colt (1893)
- Horse of the Year (1893)
- Racing Hall of Fame (1955)

Hamburg:

- Champion Two-Year-Old Colt (1897)
- Horse of the Year (1898)
- Racing Hall of Fame (1986)

== Records ==
Speed record:

- 1:12.00 – Sir Martin (1908) 6 F.
- 1:10.20 – Winged Foot (1896) 5 ¾ F.

Most wins by a jockey:

- 2 – Edward Garrison (1893, 1894)
- 2 – Walter Miller (1906, 1907)

Most wins by a trainer:

- 7 – John E. Madden (1897, 1899, 1901, 1902, 1903, 1904, 1908)

Most wins by an owner:

- 6 – John E. Madden (1897, 1899, 1901, 1903, 1904, 1908)

Most wins by a breeder:

- 7 – John E. Madden (1897, 1899, 1901, 1902, 1903, 1904, 1908)

== Winners ==
Year	Winner	Age	Jockey	Trainer	Owner	Dist. (Miles)	Time	Win$
1913	Punch Bowl	2	Phil Musgrave	Edward W. Heffner	E. F. Cooney	6 F	1:14.20	$3,850
1912	No races held due to the Hart–Agnew Law.							
1911	No races held due to the Hart–Agnew Law.							
1910	Round The World	2	Albert Walsh	William G. Yanke	William G. Yanke	6 F	1:13.40	$7,075
1909	Dalmatian	2	Vincent Powers	Sam Hildreth	Sam Hildreth	6 F	1:13.40	$1,925
1908	Sir Martin	2	James Lee	John E. Madden	John E. Madden	6 F	1:12.00	$19,550
1907	Colin	2	Walter Miller	James G. Rowe Sr.	James R. Keene	6 F	1:12.40	$19,550
1906	Oran	2	Walter Miller	Thomas Welsh	Ormondale Stable (William O'Brien Macdonough)	6 F	1:12.80	$19,550
1905	Security	2	Eddie Dominick	Sam Hildreth	Edward E. Smathers	6 F	1:15.00	$19,550
1904	Flyback	2	Gene Hildebrand	John E. Madden	John E. Madden	6 F	1:13.40	$19,550
1903	Pulsus	2	Frank O'Neill	John E. Madden	Edward R. Thomas & John E. Madden	6 F	1:13.80	$19,550
1902	Irish Lad	2	Nash Turner	John E. Madden	Westbury Stable (H. P. Whitney & H. B. Duryea)	6 F	1:14.00	$17,460
1901	Blue Girl	2	Willie Shaw	John E. Madden	John E. Madden & William C. Whitney	6 F	1:13.20	$15,500
1900	Commando	2	Henry Spencer	James G. Rowe Sr.	James R. Keene	5.75 F	1:11.80	$15,500
1899	David Garrick	2	Frank O'Leary	John E. Madden	John E. Madden	5.75 F	1:12.40	$17,140
1898	Jean Bereaud	2	Tod Sloan	Sam Hildreth	Sydney Paget	5.75 F	1:13.00	$15,550
1897	Hamburg	2	Elbert Willhite	John E. Madden	John E. Madden	5.75 F	1:12.20	$10,550
1896	Winged Foot	2	John McCafferty	John McCafferty	John McCafferty	5.75 F	1:10.20	$17,350
1895	Handspring	2	Henry Griffin	Frank McCabe	Philip J. Dwyer	5.75 F	1:10.80	$16,800
1894	Waltzer	2	Edward Garrison	John J. Hyland	David Gideon & John Daly	5.75 F	1:15.00	$16,700
1893	Domino	2	Edward Garrison	William Lakeland	James R. & Foxhall P. Keene	5.75 F	1:14.00	$23,100
1892	Chiswick	2	Anthony Hamilton	Albert Cooper	Foxhall P. Keene	5.75 F	1:15.00	$23,600
1891	His Highness	2	Marty Bergen	John J. Hyland	David Gideon	5.75 F	1:12.20	$22,095
