= Ogden (horse) =

British-bred Thoroughbred racehorse

- Sire: Kilwarlin
- Grandsire: Arbitrator
- Dam: Oriole
- Damsire: Bend Or
- Sex: Stallion
- Foaled: 1894
- Died: 1923 (aged 28–29)
- Country: United Kingdom
- Colour: Bay
- Breeder: Marcus Daly; F. Luscombe
- Owner: 1) Marcus Daly; 2) John E. Madden
- Trainer: William Lakeland
- Record: 28: 15 - 8 - 1
- Earnings: $59,070

Major wins
- Belmont Futurity Stakes (1896); Great Eastern Handicap (1896); Long Island Handicap (1898)

Honours
- American Champion Two-Year-Old Colt (1896); Leading juvenile sire in United States (1914)

Ogden (1894–1923) was a British-bred Thoroughbred racehorse that was imported to the United States at a young age and became one of the top sires in the US during the 1910s. He notably sired Sir Martin, winner of the 1910 Coronation Cup in the UK, and The Finn, 1915 Belmont Stakes winner.

== Pedigree ==
Ogden was sired by the British stallion Kilwarlin, winner of the 1887 St. Leger Stakes, and his dam was Oriole, herself a daughter of the 1880 Epsom Derby winner, Bend Or. Ogden is officially recorded by The Jockey Club as being foaled in the United Kingdom and is recorded in volume 17 of the General Stud Book, kept by the British Jockey Club, as being foaled on April 10, 1894. The decision to breed Oriole to Kilwarlin was made by the mare's initial owner, F. Luscombe. Oriole was bought in December 1893 by copper magnate and prominent horseman Marcus Daly after she had been bred to Kilwarlin, leading to persistent rumors that Ogden was actually foaled en route to Daly's Montana stud farm and he was named after Ogden, Utah. However, Oriole did not arrive in the United States until October 1894, arriving aboard the steamship Manitoba, making it more likely that Ogden was imported as a weanling with his dam.

== Racing career ==
Ogden was trained at Daly's Bitteroot Stud Farm in Montana and initially raced at local racetracks near Butte before being shipped to the Eastern racing circuit in New York and New Jersey as two-year-old. He was an unanticipated winner in the 1896 Futurity Stakes and won the Great Eclipse Stakes that year. Ogden was the leading two-year-old money winner of 1896. At age four, Ogden won the Long Island Handicap and was third in the 1897 Suburban Handicap. In his racing career, Ogden started in 28 races and won 15, earning $59,070 over four years.

== Progeny ==
Marcus Daly died in late 1900. Ogden was initially sold to William Lakeland, who raced him in the 1901 season, then sold him to John E. Madden in December 1901. He stood at Madden's Lexington stud farm, Hamburg Place, until Ogden's death in 1923. Ogden's most notable sons are Sir Martin and The Finn. Sir Martin (b. 1906) was a half-brother of the first U.S. Triple Crown winner Sir Barton and was a good runner in the US and UK during the early 1900s. The Finn (b. 1912) was the most successful sire of Ogden's get, siring Zev, who won the 1923 Kentucky Derby and the 1923 Belmont Stakes, as well as Flying Ebony, who won the 1925 Kentucky Derby.From 1907 to 1922, Ogden sired 527 stakes winners for a combined winnings total of over $1 million, and was the leading juvenile sire of 1914. Ogden is buried in the equine cemetery at Hamburg Place.

== Sire line tree ==
- Ogden
  - Belmere
  - Fayette
  - Sir Martin
    - Joy Smoke
    - Star Lore
    - Healy
    - Spinach
  - Paris
  - The Finn
    - Kai-Sang
      - Mei Foo
      - Kai-Feng
      - Kai-Finn
      - Repaid
    - Bud Lerner
      - Mokatam
      - Thanksgiving
        - Thirteen
    - Zev
      - Zevson
    - Flying Ebony
      - Flying Heels
      - Dark Secret
      - Vicar
    - Finite
  - Captain Alcock
