= Bowie Handicap (Pimlico) =

- Class: Discontinued stakes
- Location: Pimlico Race Course, Baltimore, Maryland; United States
- Inaugurated: 1909
- Race type: Thoroughbred - Flat racing

Race information
- Distance: 2 miles (16 furlongs)
- Surface: Dirt
- Track: left-handed
- Qualification: Three-year-olds and up

The Bowie Handicap at Pimlico Race Course in Baltimore, Maryland was a Thoroughbred horse race run between 1909 and 1938. A race on dirt, this once much anticipated event that drew some of the very best horses in the country was contested at distances from a mile and one-quarter to as much as two miles.

== Historical notes ==
The inaugural running on November 9, 1909, offered a purse of $2,000 added and was won by that year's American Horse of the Year Fitz Herbert whose winning time broke the world record time for two miles on dirt.

The 1918 edition of the Bowie Handicap, set at a distance of a mile and one-half, saw something that remains a real rarity even to this day in American Thoroughbred racing when three Kentucky Derby winners finished 1–2–3. In a field of fifteen runners, jockey Frank Robinson guided the 1916 Kentucky Derby winner George Smith to an easy win in track record time. 1917 Derby winner Omar Khayyam finished second and the legendary Exterminator, the 1918 Derby victor, ran third. Noteworthy too is that the 1918 Preakness Stakes winner War Cloud finished twelfth.

The winner of the 1924 Bowie Handicap was competing for the first time in the colors of his new owner Joseph E. Widener. Under future U.S. Racing Hall of Fame jockey Ivan Parke, the three-year-old Altawood justified his purchase with a win in track record time for the mile and a half distance.

Peanuts won the 1926 running of Bowie Handicap against a very strong field. He defeated ten other starters including the future Hall of Fame inductee Princess Doreen, that year's Preakness Stakes winner Display, as well as that year's American Champion Three-Year-Old Filly Edith Cavell.

With the Great Depression at its now deepest point, the Bowie Handicap was not run from 1933 through 1936. The return of the event in 1937 saw it become the highlight win of the year for the filly Esposa while en route to earning the first of her two American Champion Older Female Horse titles. Ridden by Canadian jockey Nick Wall, not only did Esposa win the mile and five-eighths Bowie Handicap in track record time, she did it by beating the mighty Seabiscuit by a nose.

== Cancellation and transfer ==
With the popularity of long-distance races starting to decline combined with the deep ongoing costs of the Great Depression, Pimlico's Bowie Handicap had its final running on November 15, 1938. The mile and five-eighths race was won by Count Arthur, a six-year-old owned by Fannie Hertz, wife of the Hertz car rental company founding owner. They became major figures in Thoroughbred racing due in large part to the success of the very great Hall of Fame runner and sire Count Fleet who won the U.S. Triple Crown in 1943.

Based in Baltimore, Maryland, Pimlico Race Course then immediately made preparations to transfer the rights to the Bowie Handicap name to Bowie Race Track near Bowie, Maryland where a new Bowie Handicap was inaugurated on April 1, 1939, run at the much shorter distance of one mile and seventy yards.

== Records ==
Speed record:

- 3:25.40 @ 2 miles: Fitz Herbert (1909)
- 2:30.60 @ 1 1/2 miles: Altawood (1924)
- 2:45.20 @ 1-5/8 miles: Esposa (1937)

Most wins:

- No horse ever won this race more than once.

Most wins by a jockey:

- 3 - Earl Sande (1920, 1921, 1923)

Most wins by a trainer:

- 4 - Samuel C. Hildreth (1909, 1911, 1915, 1920)

Most wins by an owner:

- 4 - Samuel C. Hildreth (1909, 1911, 1915, 1920)

== Winners ==
Year	Winner	Age	Jockey	Trainer	Owner	Dist. (Miles)	Time	Win $
1938	Count Arthur	6	Johnny Longden	Don Cameron	Fannie Hertz	1-5/8 m	2:46.00	$9,400
1937	Esposa	5	Nick Wall	Matthew P. Brady	William Ziegler Jr.	1-5/8 m	2:45.20	$9,375
1933	1936	Race not held						
1932	Dark Secret	3	Alfred Robertson	James E. Fitzsimmons	Wheatley Stable	1-1/2 m	2:37.20	$3,950
1931	Mate	3	George Ellis	Arthur Hullcoat	Albert C. Bostwick Jr.	1-1/2 m	2:32.00	$8,750
1930	Inception	4	Willie Cannon	W. A. Harris	Rigan McKinney	1-1/2 m	2:32.80	$9,400
1929	Diavolo	4	James H. Burke	James E. Fitzsimmons	Wheatley Stable	1-1/2 m	2:33.20	$9,375
1928	Genie	3	Willie Kelsay	Henry McDaniel	Gifford A. Cochran	1-1/2 m	2:34.40	$9,500
1927	Edith Cavell	4	Edgar Barnes	Scott P. Harlan	Walter M. Jeffords Sr.	1-1/2 m	2:33.40	$8,825
1926	Peanuts	4	Laverne Fator	George P. Odom	Robert Livingston Gerry Sr.	1-1/2 m	2:31.20	$9,550
1925	Princess Doreen	4	Chick Lang	S. Miller Henderson	Audley Farm Stable	1-1/2 m	2:34.80	$8,540
1924	Altawood	3	Ivan Parke	G. Hamilton Keene	Joseph E. Widener	1-1/2 m	2:30.60	$8,550
1923	My Dear	6	Earl Sande	Fred Musante	Fred Musante	1-1/2 m	2:34.80	$7,400
1922	Captain Alcock	5	Frank Keogh	James E. Fitzsimmons	Quincy Stable (James Francis Johnson)	1-1/2 m	2:33.40	$7,400
1921	Boniface	6	Earl Sande	Henry McDaniel	J. K. L. Ross	1-1/2 m	2:31.80	
1920	Mad Hatter	5	Earl Sande	Samuel C. Hildreth	Samuel C. Hildreth	1-1/2 m	2:31.60	$7,700
1919	Royce Rools	4	Eddie Ambrose	Lewis W. Garth	W. T. Wilkinson	1-1/2 m	2:33.80	$7,100
1918	George Smith	5	Frank Robinson	Preston M. Burch	John Sanford	1-1/2 m	2:31.20	$8,600
1917	Westy Hogan	3	W. O'Brien	Richard F. Carman	Wilfrid Viau	1-1/2 m	2:31.80	
1916	Short Grass	8	Frank Keogh	John J. Flanigan	Emil Herz	1-1/2 m	2:37.60	$3,075
1915	Stromboli	4	John McTaggart	Samuel C. Hildreth	Samuel C. Hildreth	1-3/4 m	3:02.00	$1,293
1914	Flying Fairy	4	John McTaggart	J. Simon Healy	Edward B. Cassatt	1-3/4 m	3:01.60	$1,280
1913	Buskin	3	Charles Fairbrother	John Whalen	John Whalen	2 m	3:29.80	$1,410
1912	Mission	3	Andy Ferguson	J. Murphy	August Belmont Jr.	2 m	3:28.20	$1,530
1911	Zeus	3	Carroll H. Shilling	Samuel C. Hildreth	Samuel C. Hildreth	2 m	3:32.00	$2,340
1910	Everett	3	Joe McCahey	George Cornnell	Quincy Stable (James Francis Johnson)	2 m	3:25.60	$2,370
1909	Fitz Herbert	3	Carroll H. Shilling	Samuel C. Hildreth	Samuel C. Hildreth	2 m	3:25.40	
