= The Finn =

American-bred Thoroughbred racehorse

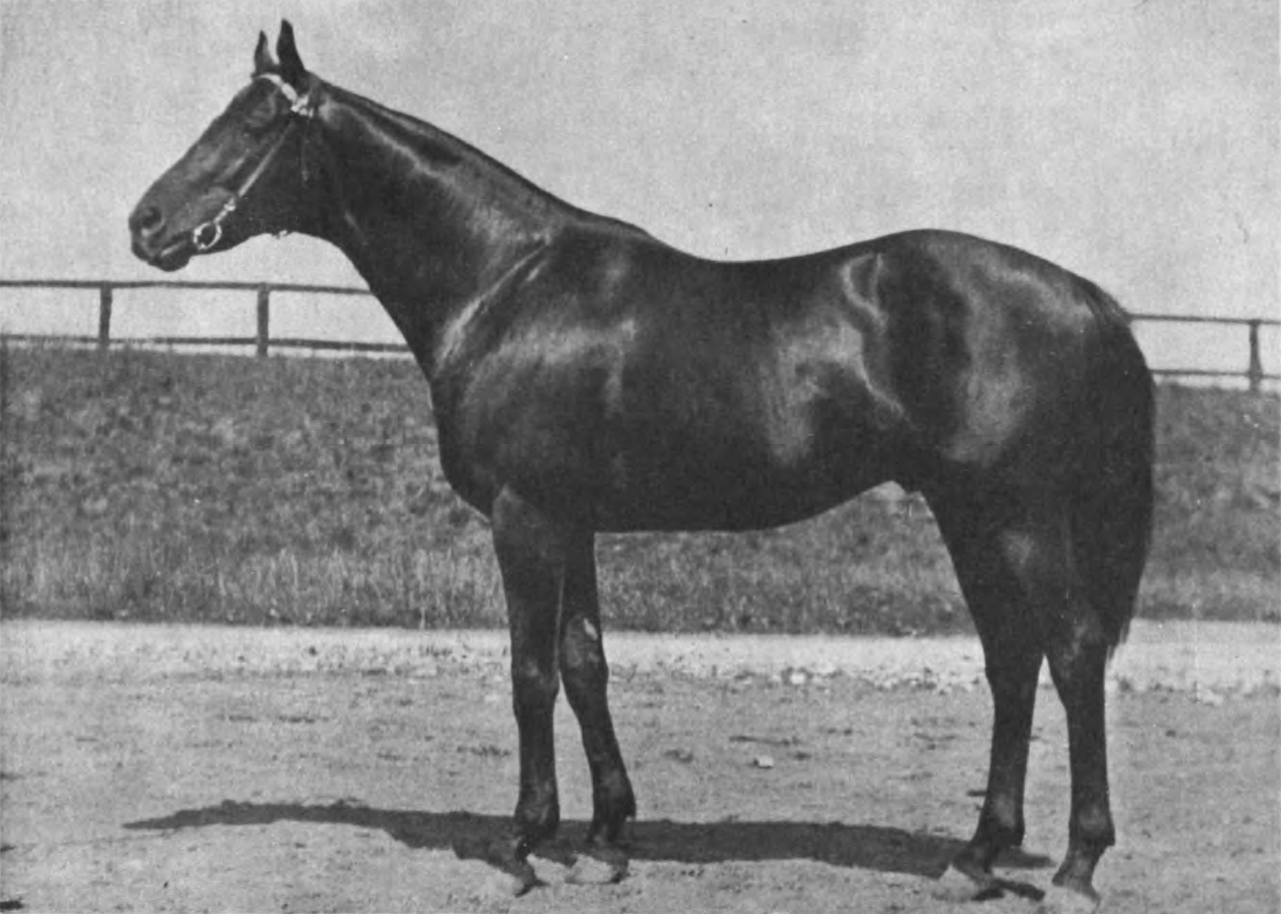
- The Finn
- Sire: Ogden
- Grandsire: Kilwarlin
- Dam: Livonia
- Damsire: Star Shoot
- Sex: Stallion
- Foaled: 1912
- Died: 1925 (aged 12–13)
- Country: United States
- Colour: Black
- Breeder: John E. Madden
- Owner: 1) John E. Madden; 2) Harry C. Hallenbeck; 3) Glen Helen Stud (1923)
- Trainer: Edward W. Heffner
- Record: 50: 19-10-6
- Earnings: $38,965

Major wins
- Withers Stakes (1915); Huron Handicap (1915); Southampton Handicap (1915); Hamilton Derby (1915); Baltimore Handicap (1915); Manhattan Handicap (1915, 1916); Metropolitan Handicap (1916); Champlain Handicap (1916); Chesterbrook Handicap (1916); Havre de Grace Handicap (1916); Merchants and Citizens Handicap (1916); Long Beach Handicap (Jamaica, NY) (1917) American Classics race wins Belmont Stakes (1915)

Awards
- American Champion Three-Year-Old Male Horse (1915); Leading sire in North America (1923)

The Finn (1912–1925) was an American Thoroughbred racehorse that is best remembered as the winner of the 1915 Belmont Stakes. He won six other stakes races that year and was retroactively recognized as the American Champion three-year-old colt. He was later the sire of Zev and Flying Ebony, the respective winners of the 1923 and 1925 Kentucky Derbies. The Finn was the leading sire in North America of 1923.

== Background ==
The Finn was foaled in Lexington, Kentucky at Hamburg Place, the stud farm of John E. Madden. The Finn was sired by the imported British stallion Ogden, who was the 1896 Belmont Futurity Stakes winner, out of the mare Livonia by Star Shoot.

The Finn originally ran for Madden as a homebred. He was sold in May 1915 to Harry C. Hallenbeck in a package deal with another horse for $35,000. He was trained by Edward Heffner.

== Racing career ==
The Finn won three of nine starts at age two. His stand-out performance came in a maiden race at Aqueduct when he set a track record of :59 2/5 for five furlongs. He also won two handicaps that year. However, he did not finish in the Belmont Futurity because he threw his rider.

=== 1915: three-year-old season ===
At age three, The Finn won nine of twenty starts, and also finished second four times. In addition to winning the 1915 Belmont Stakes, he won the Withers, Southampton Handicap, Hamilton Derby, Huron Handicap, Baltimore Handicap, Ellicott City Handicap, Dixie Handicap and Manhattan Handicap.

The Finn was not ready to run in the 1915 Kentucky Derby in early May, but on May 29 was the second betting choice in the fortieth running of the Withers Stakes, then one of the most important races of the American racing calendar. He went to the lead and won "in a great, big gallop" by two lengths. In the Belmont Stakes on June 4, only three horses ran after Derby winner Regret bypassed the race. The Finn led from the start and was never seriously challenged. On June 15, he established himself as the best three-year-old of the crop, with the possible exception of Regret, by winning the Southampton Handicap while conceding from four to 28 pounds to his rivals. This time he trailed the early pace set by Garbage, then started his move on the backstretch and took command turning for home.

Over the summer and autumn, The Finn won several more times. However, he was unexpectedly beaten in the Knickerbocker Handicap, a defeat that led to the temporary suspension of Heffner's training license.

=== 1916: four-year-old season ===
The Finn earned his first win as a four-year-old on May 26 in the Metropolitan Handicap. He rated behind the fast early pace set by High Noon and Stromboli, then closed in the final furlong to win by half a length to the cheers of the crowd. The Finn was so full of run that he could not be pulled up for half a mile.

The Finn won five more stakes races that year, including his second win in the Manhattan Handicap. Despite carrying top weight of 130 pounds, he won easily by 2 1/2 lengths. In late September, he finished his campaign with two wins at Havre de Grace in one week. After he beat Roamer in the Havre de Grace Handicap, The New York Times called him the best four-year-old in the country. He won six of twelve that starts that year, conceding weight in all of them.

At age five, The Finn's only win came in the Long Beach Handicap at Jamaica, where he equaled the track record for 9 furlongs of 1:52.

== Stud career ==
The Finn was the sire of either 16 or 17 stakes winners from 130 or 134 named foals, depending on the source. This included two Classic winning sons, Zev and Flying Ebony. He also sired Kai-Sang (Jerome Handicap, Lawrence Realization), Bud Lerner (Youthful Stakes) and Finite. Though not generally successful as a broodmare sire, his daughter Khara established a successful family that included important sire Habitat.

The Finn died in September 1925 at the age of thirteen, siring 143 foals. Although several of his sons were useful sires, his last successful tail-male descendant was the short-lived Puerto Rican racehorse Camarero, who set the record for the most consecutive victories (56) for a Thoroughbred racehorse in 1955.

== Sire line tree ==
- The Finn
  - Kai-Sang
    - Mei Foo
    - Kai-Feng
    - Kai-Finn
    - Repaid
  - Bud Lerner
    - Mokatam
    - Thanksgiving
      - Thirteen
        - Camarero
  - Zev
    - Zevson
  - Flying Ebony
    - Flying Heels
    - Dark Secret
    - Vicar
  - Finite

== Pedigree ==
Pedigree of The Finn, black horse, 1912
Sire *Ogden	Kilwarlin (GB)	Arbitrator (IRE)	Solon (IRE)
Sire *Ogden	Kilwarlin (GB)	Arbitrator (IRE)	True Heart (GB)
Sire *Ogden	Kilwarlin (GB)	Hasty Girl (IRE)	Lord Gough (GB)
Sire *Ogden	Kilwarlin (GB)	Hasty Girl (IRE)	Irritation (GB)
Sire *Ogden	*Oriole	Bend Or (GB)	Doncaster (GB)
Sire *Ogden	*Oriole	Bend Or (GB)	Rouge Rose (GB)
Sire *Ogden	*Oriole	Fenella (FR)	Cambuscan (GB)
Sire *Ogden	*Oriole	Fenella (FR)	La Favorite (FR)
Dam Livonia	*Star Shoot	Isinglass (GB)	Isonomy (GB)
Dam Livonia	*Star Shoot	Isinglass (GB)	Dead Lock
Dam Livonia	*Star Shoot	Astrology (GB)	Hermit (GB)
Dam Livonia	*Star Shoot	Astrology (GB)	Stella (GB)
Dam Livonia	Woodray	*Rayon D'Or	Flageolet (FR)
Dam Livonia	Woodray	*Rayon D'Or	Araucaria (GB)
Dam Livonia	Woodray	Wood Nymph	*Ill Used
Dam Livonia	Woodray	Wood Nymph	Woodbine (family 4)
