= Flying Heels =

American-bred Thoroughbred racehorse

- Sire: Flying Ebony
- Grandsire: The Finn
- Dam: Heeltaps
- Damsire: Ultimus
- Sex: Stallion
- Foaled: 1927
- Died: 1940 (aged 12–13)
- Country: United States
- Color: Bay/Brown
- Breeder: Gifford A. Cochran
- Owner: 1) Gifford A. Cochran; 2) John J. Curtis
- Trainer: 1) Henry McDaniel; 2) J. Simon Healy
- Record: 43: 17-16-1
- Earnings: US$123,435

Major wins
- Nursery Handicap (1929); Pimlico Futurity (1929); Remsen Stakes (1929); Manhattan Handicap (1930); Delaware Handicap (1930); Carter Handicap (1930, 1931); Blemton Handicap Plate (1931); Fleetwing Handicap (1931); Hialeah Inaugural Handicap (1932); New Hampshire Handicap (1933); Speed Handicap (1933)

Honors
- Flying Heels Handicap at Aqueduct Racetrack

Flying Heels (1927–1940) was an American Thoroughbred racehorse that won stakes races at age two through six, including a number which are Grade I events today. Bred and raced by Gifford A. Cochran, he was sired by the 1925 Kentucky Derby winner, Flying Ebony and out of the racemare Heeltaps.

Flying Heels was trained for Gifford Cochran by future U.S. Racing Hall of Fame inductee, Henry McDaniel. However, Cochran died on December 5, 1930 and at a May 23, 1931 Fasig-Tipton dispersal sale Flying Heels was sold by his Estate to John J. Curtis who turned his training over to the very capable Simon Healy.

== At stud ==
Retired at the end of the 1933 racing season having won seventeen times with earnings of $123,435, Flying Heels was sent to stand at stud at Timberlawn Stock Farm in Bourbon County, Kentucky, owned by Edwin K. Thomas. Horses from his first crop foaled in 1935 which began racing in 1937 included nine who were race winners with Spindletop, Shining Heels and Flying Wild winning stakes races.

From his second crop in 1936, his daughter Flying Lill would further enhance Flying Heels' reputation as a sire. Racing at age three in 1939 for owners Mr. and Mrs. Charles H. Cleary, among her wins that year Flying Lill captured the prestigious Kentucky Oaks at Churchill Downs in May and the Matron Stakes in July at Arlington Park. Flying Lill followed that up with another Arlington Park win in the July 19th Springfield Handicap that marked her eighth win out of ten starts for the year. Although Flying Heels was the sire of a number of other winners, none met with his own success or that of Flying Lill.

Flying Heels died on May 8, 1940, in a nighttime barn fire at Timberlawn Stock Farm.

== Pedigree ==
Pedigree of Flying Heels, chestnut stallion, 1927
Sire Flying Ebony 1922	The Finn	Ogden	Kilwarlin
Sire Flying Ebony 1922	The Finn	Ogden	Oriole
Sire Flying Ebony 1922	The Finn	Livonia	Star Shoot
Sire Flying Ebony 1922	The Finn	Livonia	Woodray
Sire Flying Ebony 1922	Princess Mary	Hessian	Watercress*
Sire Flying Ebony 1922	Princess Mary	Hessian	Colonial
Sire Flying Ebony 1922	Princess Mary	Royal Gun	Royal Hampton
Sire Flying Ebony 1922	Princess Mary	Royal Gun	Spring Gun
Dam Heeltaps 1920	Ultimus	Commando	Domino*
Dam Heeltaps 1920	Ultimus	Commando	Emma C
Dam Heeltaps 1920	Ultimus	Running Stream	Domino*
Dam Heeltaps 1920	Ultimus	Running Stream	Dancing Water
Dam Heeltaps 1920	Queen of the Water	Water Boy	Watercress*
Dam Heeltaps 1920	Queen of the Water	Water Boy	Zealandia
Dam Heeltaps 1920	Queen of the Water	Planutess	Planudes
Dam Heeltaps 1920	Queen of the Water	Planutess	Countess Wanda (family: A4)

* Flying Heels is inbred 4S × 4D to the stallion Watercress, meaning that he appears fourth generation on the sire side of his pedigree and fourth generation on the dam side of his pedigree.

* Flying Heels is inbred 4D × 4D to the stallion Domino, meaning that he appears twice fourth generation on the dam side of his pedigree.
