= Camarero =

Puerto Rican Thoroughbred racehorse

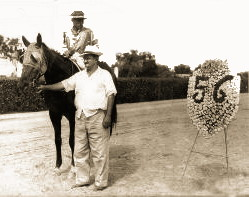
- Sire: Thirteen
- Grandsire: Thanksgiving
- Dam: Flint Maid
- Damsire: Flint Shot
- Sex: Stallion
- Foaled: 1951
- Country: Puerto Rico
- Colour: Bay
- Breeder: Luis Rechani Agrait
- Owner: Jose Coll-Vidal
- Trainer: Pablo Suarez
- Record: 77: 73-2-0
- Earnings: $43,553

Major wins
- El Imparcial (1953); Corazón (1953); Luis Muñoz Rivera Stakes (1953); Governor's Cup (1954); Jose de Diego Stakes (1954); Primavera Stakes (1954); Labor Day (1955)

Awards
- Puerto Rico Horse of the Year (1954, 1955)

Honors
- Puerto Rico Horse Racing Hall of Fame (1958)

Camarero (June 16, 1951–August 27, 1956) was a Thoroughbred racehorse that was raised and raced in Puerto Rico. He was the winner of 73 races, including the Triple Crown of Thoroughbred Racing in Puerto Rico. Camarero is notable for setting the current world record of the most consecutive wins for a Thoroughbred racehorse at 56 in a series of races between April 1953 and August 1955.

== Background ==
Cameraro was sired by Thirteen who was a son of 1938 Travers Stakes winner Thanksgiving. His name translates to "waiter" in Spanish. Camarero was a small bay colt described as "pony sized" weighing 750 pounds and standing only 14 hands high. His male line traced to The Finn and he was bred and owned by prominent San Juan newspaper man Jose Coll-Vidal.

As per Puerto Rican racetrack regulation, prohibitive favorites are not allowed to be wagered on, which meant that for most of Camarero's winning streak no on-track bets were taken. Camarero was the first winner of Puerto Rico's Triple Crown of Thoroughbred Racing, winning the Governor's Cup, Jose de Diego Stakes and Primavera Stakes in 1954, undefeated. As well, according to Hall of Fame Jockey Angel Cordero Jr. "he [Cameraro] means horse racing."

== History ==
On July 19, 1951, Camarera foaled a black colt with four white pasterns who was named Sabrosito. Through Coll-Vidal's foal-sharing agreement with breeder Luis Rechani-Agrait, the colt was bred in Rechani-Agrait's name and foaled on his farm.

A year later, Coll-Vidal and trainer Pablo Suarez first saw Sabrosito, whom Coll-Vidal said looked like a small donkey. However, Suarez insisted that Coll-Vidal take the well-bred yearling. He did and renamed the colt Camarero in honor of his dam.

At the beginning of the 1950s, Puerto Rico's economy had declined, and many lived in poverty. By 1953, when Camarero began his career, only two tracks were operating.

Camarero made his first start on April 14, 1953, at two furlongs at Quintana racetrack and won by three lengths. On May 17, he won his second race; seven days later, he won his first stakes race in front-running fashion by four lengths. On July 17, he won his fifth race when he took the six-furlong Luis Mu-oz Rivera Stakes by seven lengths. From August 23 to October 23, Camarero won eight more races, including another stakes. His jockey in his first 13 victories was Juan Diaz-Andino.

Coll-Vidal had come close to Kincsem's record with two other horses, Cofresi and Condado, who won 49 and 43 consecutive races, respectively. He believed that for Camarero to break the record, he would have to replace the colt's jockey with leading rider Mateo Matos.

In 1952, Matos exercised horses at Aqueduct for Horatio Luro but returned to Puerto Rico. When he was first asked to ride the undefeated Camarero, Matos declined. "He wanted to sleep in peace," wrote Jorge Colón-Delgado in his book about Camarero. Assured that Coll-Vidal would not replace him if he lost aboard Camarero, Matos agreed to ride the colt.

Camarero recorded five more victories to finish his two-year-old campaign in 1953 with 18 wins. On New Year's Day in 1954, he won the 6 1/2-furlong Governor's Cup while carrying 120 pounds, eight more than the second-highest-weighted horse in the race. The Governor's Cup was the first leg of Puerto Rico's Triple Crown, which was established in 1951 and had not yet been won.

The next two legs were the 1 1/16-mile Jose de Diego Stakes and the 1 1/8-mile Primavera Stakes. Camarero could carry high weight, but it was unknown if he could race successfully at longer distances. On January 11, 1954, he won his 20th race by ten lengths while going 1 1/16 miles, eliminating any doubts of his ability.

On April 17, Camarero won the Jose de Diego Stakes for his 28th win. On May 9, carrying 15 pounds more than any other rival, he won the Primavera Stakes to become Puerto Rico's first Triple Crown winner. On his actual third birthday, Camarero won his 32nd race and set a 6 1/2-furlong track record. After winning another race ten days later, he was rested for a few months.

On October 24, he won his next start. He finished his three-year-old campaign with his 37th victory on December 19 and was selected Horse of the Year.

Racing's popularity in Puerto Rico increased with each of Camarero's victories. By the end of 1954, track attendance had jumped 25%.

"Some people would say that he was allowed to win, but that wasn't true," Cordero recalled. "He used to win because he was the best. The only thing was he never raced against horses [that were not bred] in Puerto Rico. But in my opinion, he could have competed against any horse at the time. ... But since he was chasing the world record, they kept racing him against Puerto Rican-bred horses."

At four in 1955, Camarero won nine more races from January 6 to April 22 and was nine wins away from the record. During the first 32 racing days of the year, total handle increased 64% compared with the previous year. Many in Puerto Rico were talking about Camarero and chanting "Camarero en punta," or "Camarero up front," a phrase used by track announcer Pito Rivera-Monge when the colt headed to victory.

On July 18, 1955, Camarero won his 54th race to tie Kincsem's record. Interest in him was covered in the New York Times. Finally, it was announced that Camarero would go for the world record on August 7 in the fourth race at Quintana.

At the start of the 6 1/2-furlong race, the eight horses broke alertly. Matos initially held Camarero back but let him go by the half-mile pole, and the colt responded to win by six lengths.

"With 600 meters to go, Camarero was already ahead and I could hear the people screaming," Matos recalled in Col-n-Delgado's book. "Coming down the stretch, I knew I had the race. Camarero started to pull away easily. The closer that we would get to the finish line, the louder the people would get in the stands. It was incredible. When I passed the finish line, I remember telling myself, 'We did it. We finally did it.' "

"When Camarero established the world record, I was at the track that day," Cordero said. "I was too young to fully understand what was going on. All I knew was that Camarero was our champion and that every time he raced, he would win." Camarero was scheduled to rest following his world-record victory but instead returned ten days later and scored his 56th consecutive victory.

Nine days later, he lost for the first time in his career. He raced 20 more times, winning 17 times. By the end of his career, he had won 73 out of 77 starts with two seconds and zero thirds.

== Death ==
Camarero would run his final race on August 26, 1956. He died only a day later of an intestinal obstruction. His gravesite at Hipodromo Quintana was visited by 10,000 fans during the funeral ceremony.

== Honours ==
In 1958 Camarero was the first inductee in the Puerto Rico Horse Racing Hall of Fame. In 2006, the name of El Nuevo Comandante racetrack in Canóvanas, Puerto Rico, was changed to Hipódromo Camarero, in honor of the racehorse, as well the Camarero Awards are given annually to Puerto Rico's champion racehorses.

== Pedigree ==
Pedigree of Camarero (PR), bay stallion, 1951
Sire Thirteen (USA) 1942	Thanksgiving; 1935	Bud Lerner	The Finn
Sire Thirteen (USA) 1942	Thanksgiving; 1935	Bud Lerner	Dreamsome
Sire Thirteen (USA) 1942	Thanksgiving; 1935	Inchcape Belle	Inchcape
Sire Thirteen (USA) 1942	Thanksgiving; 1935	Inchcape Belle	Swan Song
Sire Thirteen (USA) 1942	Go Seek; 1938	Bold Venture	St. Germans
Sire Thirteen (USA) 1942	Go Seek; 1938	Bold Venture	Possible
Sire Thirteen (USA) 1942	Go Seek; 1938	Illusive	General Lee
Sire Thirteen (USA) 1942	Go Seek; 1938	Illusive	French Doll
Dam Flint Maid (Camarera) 1942	Flint Shot; 1931	Chance Shot	Fair Play
Dam Flint Maid (Camarera) 1942	Flint Shot; 1931	Chance Shot	Quelle Chance
Dam Flint Maid (Camarera) 1942	Flint Shot; 1931	La Bayonette	Verwood
Dam Flint Maid (Camarera) 1942	Flint Shot; 1931	La Bayonette	Rondeau
Dam Flint Maid (Camarera) 1942	Elktonia Maid; 1935	Vandergrift	Ben Brush
Dam Flint Maid (Camarera) 1942	Elktonia Maid; 1935	Vandergrift	Noonday
Dam Flint Maid (Camarera) 1942	Elktonia Maid; 1935	Marta O'Day	Marta Santa
Dam Flint Maid (Camarera) 1942	Elktonia Maid; 1935	Marta O'Day	Bettie O'Day (Family: 4-m)

== See also ==
- List of leading Thoroughbred racehorses
