= Bolingbroke (horse) =

American-bred Thoroughbred racehorse

- Sire: Equipoise
- Grandsire: Pennant
- Dam: Wayabout
- Damsire: Fair Play
- Sex: Stallion
- Foaled: 1937
- Country: United States
- Color: Bay
- Breeder: Joseph E. Widener
- Owner: Townsend B. Martin
- Trainer: Walter Burrows
- Record: 69: 14-10-16
- Earnings: US$161,270

Major wins
- Manhattan Handicap (1940, 1942, 1943); Saratoga Cup (1942, 1944); New York Handicap (1943); Whitney Stakes (1943); Jockey Club Gold Cup (1944)

Bolingbroke (foaled 1937 in Kentucky) was an American Thoroughbred racehorse that won top-level races on New York State tracks including the Manhattan Handicap three times. In his 1942 Manhattan win, under jockey Herb Lindberg, Bolingbroke set a new United States record time of 2:27 3/5 for 1 1/2 miles on dirt while defeating the 1941 U.S. Triple Crown winner, Whirlaway.

Bred by major racing stable and racetrack owner Joseph E. Widener at his Elmendorf Farm in Fayette County, Kentucky, Bolingbroke was a son of Equipoise, a U.S. Racing Hall of Fame inductee and six-time U.S. National Champion, including twice as Horse of the Year. Bolingbroke's dam was Wayabout, also owned by Joseph Widener. Wayabout's other notable progeny in racing was Whiffenpoof, a gelded foal of 1946. Their damsire was Fair Play, another successful runner and outstanding stallion that was a three-time Leading sire in North America (1920, 1924, 1927) and also as the Leading broodmare sire in North America (1931, 1934, 1938). Fair Play too was voted a U.S. Racing Hall of Fame member as part of the 1956 class of inductees.

== Pedigree ==
Pedigree of Bolingbroke, bay stallion, 1937
Sire Equipoise	Pennant	Peter Pan	Commando
Sire Equipoise	Pennant	Peter Pan	Cinderella (1888)
Sire Equipoise	Pennant	Royal Rose	Royal Hampton
Sire Equipoise	Pennant	Royal Rose	Belle Rose
Sire Equipoise	Swinging	Broomstick	Ben Brush
Sire Equipoise	Swinging	Broomstick	Elf
Sire Equipoise	Swinging	Balancoire	Meddler
Sire Equipoise	Swinging	Balancoire	Ballantrae
Dam Wayabout	Fair Play	Hastings	Spendthrift
Dam Wayabout	Fair Play	Hastings	Cinderella (1885)
Dam Wayabout	Fair Play	Fairy Gold	Bend Or
Dam Wayabout	Fair Play	Fairy Gold	Dame Masham
Dam Wayabout	Damaris	Sunstar	Sundridge
Dam Wayabout	Damaris	Sunstar	Doris
Dam Wayabout	Damaris	Lesbia	St. Frusquin
Dam Wayabout	Damaris	Lesbia	Glare (family: 1-m)
