= 1925 Kentucky Derby =

Horse race

51st Kentucky Derby
- Kentucky Derby
- Location: Churchill Downs
- Date: May 16, 1925
- Winning horse: Flying Ebony
- Jockey: Earl Sande
- Trainer: William B. Duke
- Owner: Gifford A. Cochran
- Conditions: Fast
- Surface: Dirt

The 1925 Kentucky Derby was the 51st running of the Kentucky Derby. The race was run on May 16, 1925.

== Payout ==
The Kentucky Derby Payout Schedule

Program Number	Horse Name	Win	Place	Show
6	Flying Ebony	$8.30	$3.80	$2.80
12	Captain Hal	–	$5.50	$4.40
14	Son of John	–	–	$5.50

== Field ==
Position	Post	Horse	Jockey	Trainer	Owner	Final Odds	Stake
1	6	Flying Ebony	Earl Sande	William B. Duke	Gifford A. Cochran	3.15	$52,950
2	12	Captain Hal	Jake Heupel	Walter S. Hopkins	A. A. Kaiser	5.60	$6,000
3	14	Son of John	Clarence Turner	William Perkins	Daniel W. Scott	16.40	$3,000
4	3	Single Foot	Albert Johnson	Harry Rites	J. Edwin Griffith	30.15	$1,000
5	9	Step Along	Earl Pool	William Perkins	Fred M. Grabner	16.40	
6	4	Swope	Eddie Legere	Albert B. "Alex" Gordon	Bud Fisher	3.15	
7	16	Prince of Bourbon	Andy Schuttinger	Roy Waldron	Lexington Stable (E. F. Simms & Henry W. Oliver)	3.15	
8	2	Needle Gun	Clyde Ponce	William J. Speirs	William Ziegler Jr.	3.15	
9	15	Kentucky Cardinal	Mack Garner	Mose F. Shapoff	G. Frank Croissant	7.50	
10	23	Boon Companion	Eddie Ambrose	Albert G. Woodman	S. A. Cowan	3.15	
11	8	Broadway Jones	Hurley Meyer	Herbert J. Thompson	Edward R. Bradley	50.85	
12	21	Quantrain	Bennie Breuning	Clyde Ector	Frederick Johnson	1.95	
13	24	Almadel	Lawrence McDermott	Will Buford	Hal Price Headley	26.45	
14	22	Backbone	Linus McAtee	James G. Rowe Sr.	Harry Payne Whitney	16.20	
15	11	Sweeping Away	Clifford Robinson	Roy Waldron	Xalapa Farm Stable	3.15	
16	7	Elector	J. D. Mooney	John B. McKee	La Brae Stable	3.15	
17	1	The Bat	Ivan H. Parke	James G. Rowe Sr.	Harry Payne Whitney	16.20	
18	17	Lee O. Cotner	Willie Fronk	Lon Johnson	R. W. Collins	3.15	
19	20	Voltaic	Frank Coltiletti	George M. Odom	Robert L. Gerry Sr.	160.75	
20	5	Chief Uncas	William J. McCleary	Harry Sanderson	Augustus A. Busch Sr.	3.15	

- Winning Breeder: John E. Madden (KY)
- Margins – 1 1/2 lengths
- Time – 2:07 3/5
- Track – Sloppy
