= Anita Madden =

Kentucky sportswoman and activist (1933–2018)

- Born: February 3, 1933
- Died: September 27, 2018 (aged 85)
- Occupations: Sportswoman, socialite, and activist

Anita Cannon Madden (née Anita K. Myers; February 3, 1933 – September 27, 2018) was an American sportswoman, socialite, and activist.

== Background ==
Anita Myers was born in Ashland, Kentucky. She grew up as a "tomboy" and played high school basketball, she was also involved in cheerleading and the drama club. She later attended Western Kentucky University for two years before transferring to the University of Kentucky (UK) in 1952.

== Personal life ==
She met Preston West Madden (born July 24, 1934 – died May 5, 2020) of Lexington, heir and grandson of horse-breeder John Madden, while both were students at UK. The two dated and then married in 1955. The Maddens' only child, Patrick Winchester Madden, was born on February 27, 1964.

She was known for her extravagant Kentucky Derby Eve gala events, inviting as many as 5,000 people. For nearly 40 years, the Maddens hosted the fundraiser until it was cancelled due to the death of Anita's mother in 1999. Every year Kentuckians and the thoroughbred industry's international high society world looked forward to the themed party. One of the themes was "Rapture of the Deep,” complete with mermaids and mermen and a figure of an octopus surrounded by a dry-ice fog; The Ultimate Odyssey, with young people togged out as Greek gods and goddesses while the Trojan War was reenacted under the gaze of a sixteen-foot statue of Zeus clutching a neon thunderbolt".

She invited movie stars, authors and politicians to her social events, and often hosting stars in her home. For example, actor Dennis Cole was counted among her longtime friends and it was said that Burt Bacharach composed a song for her. A pink and yellow cream flower with heavily ruffled gold edges, the "Anita Madden Daylily", was named after her.

== Recipes ==
The Visitor's Guide for the Lexington Convention and Visitors Bureau highlights the legacy of the Kentucky mint julep with her recipe.

A reporter from the Los Angeles Times wrote: "One year, Anita Madden noticed some guests leaving and wondered why. 'I guess they didn't have a good time,' she said. It was 5 a.m. The Madden party has been highlighted by streakers, scantily clad women on overhead swings and a flying-carpet theme with (almost) real flying carpets." Proceeds from the events reached several hundreds of thousands of dollars which went to benefit a chosen charity such as the Bluegrass Boys Ranch Scholarship Program.

== Businesswoman and community activist ==
The Hamburg Place horse farm, nearly 2000 acres originally purchased by John E. Madden in 1898, had produced five Kentucky Derby and five Belmont Stakes winners – including the first Triple Crown winner Sir Barton; however, many great breed animals, including Shetland ponies, polo ponies and Standardbreds, came from this family farm. The last of their most notable horses came in 1987 with Derby winner Alysheba. Madden made much use of the grounds for furthering the horse industry, was known for her business skills and was always part of her family's Thoroughbred enterprise.

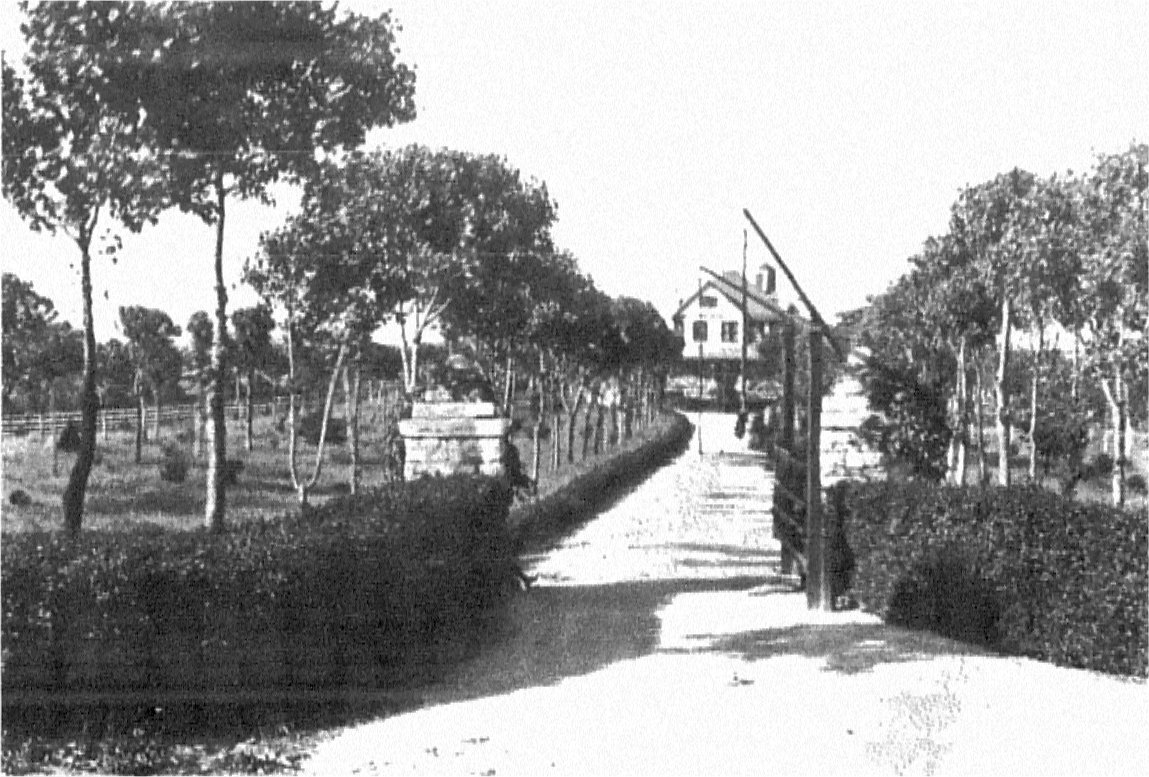
The front entryway of John E. Madden's farm Hamburg Place in Lexington, Kentucky in 1911.

In 1977, she was appointed by Lexington-Fayette County Urban Government Mayor H. Foster Pettit to the Fayette County Planning and Zoning Commission, and she continued to be appointed to this Commission for a period of seventeen years. During this time Madden was able to formulate a plan for the development of her own family farm. As she told journalist and civic leader Ed Lane, "The family joke is that I'm the idea person, Preston is the detail person and Pat gets all the credit. Actually, Patrick is the person who's responsible for all the business details and decisions, and he's the attorney for the family. He keeps everyone involved in what's going on. You can't believe the paperwork that comes past all of us, and then we have regular meetings with all the family members. Preston is responsible for running all the rest of the farm and taking care of all the things he did when he was in the horse business. That's no small job."

She was appointed to the Kentucky Horse Racing Commission by Governor John Y. Brown and served from 1980 to 1983. Her influence on the thoroughbred industry cannot be underestimated, though the scandals associated with her gala events often overshadowed her contributions. In an interview in 2000, she remembered an issue she supported regarding horse medication and was outvoted by the rest of the board. "'It's sad,' she said after the meeting. 'For all the good I did in there, I might just as well have stayed home and painted my toenails.'"

The Maddens started making plans in 1986 to subdivide approximately 100 acres of the farm into a large shopping center (named Hamburg Pavilion in 1995 when ground was first broken) and residential as well as commercial lots. The first residential development was named "The Shetlands" because that was the field where they kept their renowned ponies. "Our last stallion there was a beautiful white pony named Gunpowder and we are using his likeness on information materials concerning The Shetlands. Our next phase is named West Wind. This area was named for Preston and Uncle Pat's grandmother's residence in New York."

Madden became an important leader and contributor to Kentucky business and progress. Some of the events she organized were:

- In 1991, she donated her time to a charity auction to benefit AIDS patients; items to be auctioned were donated by celebrities such as Yoko Ono, Kenny Rogers, Scott Bakula and Elizabeth Taylor.
- In 2006, she served as honorary chair of the Blue Grass Farms Chaplaincy and Thoroughbred Retirement Foundation (TRF) Benefit Proceeds benefited farm workers served by the BGFC and retired racehorses in the care of the TRF Maker's Mark Secretariat Center—with sponsorships of $5,000.
- In 2008 was honorary host for the "Justice for All" gala—over 1000 donors for Just Fund Kentucky, advocating awareness for social justice in Kentucky, especially for lesbian, gay, bisexual and transgender citizens.

Madden explained why she felt business leaders should participate in the JustFund KY fundraiser: "Just like in sports, we should have a fair playing field; .... if it isn't fair, it's no fun!" When asked if she felt if Lexington discriminated against anyone, she replied with her characteristic forthrightness: "I think it's still not fair for women... and it's our responsibility to get the word out... that you will be more successful when you make it fair for everyone." In 2008, the Lexington Chapter of the National Association of Women Business Owners honored her as recipient of their prestigious Winner's Circle Award. Madden continued to serve on several statewide and local boards, for example, the Foundation Board for the Kentucky Historical Society; the Advisory Board for the Kentucky Equine Humane Center, and the LexArts HorseMania Committee.

== Sources ==
- Cohn, Jones, Truman, John, David, Cheryl. "A Closer Look at Others Indicted." Lexington Herald Leader 20 January 1984, Print.
- Edwards, Don. "Madden Eve a Scratch." Lexington Herald Leader 12 February 1999, Print.
- Fortune, Beverly. "Anita Madden." Lexington Herald Leader 26 April 1998, Print.
- Isaacs, Barbara. "Life Beyond Revelry, There's more to Anita Madden than Annual Party." Lexington Herald Leader 30 April 1995, Print.
