= Flying Ebony =

American-bred Thoroughbred racehorse

- Sire: The Finn
- Grandsire: Ogden
- Dam: Princess Mary
- Damsire: Hessian
- Sex: Stallion
- Foaled: 1922
- Died: 1943 (aged 20–21)
- Country: United States
- Colour: Dark Bay or Brown
- Breeder: John E. Madden
- Owner: Gifford A. Cochran
- Trainer: William B. Duke
- Record: 13: 6-1-2
- Earnings: $62,420

Major wins
- Initial Handicap (1925); Triple Crown Race wins: Kentucky Derby (1925)

Honours
- Flying Ebony Drive, Lexington, Kentucky; Flying Ebony Place, Havre De Grace, Maryland
- Last updated on 4/15/2016

Flying Ebony (1922–1943) was an American Thoroughbred racehorse best known for winning the 1925 Kentucky Derby.

== Background ==
Flying Ebony was a dark bay or brown horse bred by John E. Madden, who had already bred four Kentucky Derby winners, and was raced by New York City carpet manufacturer, Gifford A. Cochran. In 1925, Flying Ebony's training was handled by future U.S. Hall of Fame member William B. Duke, who had returned from France that year where he had been training Thoroughbreds since 1888, notably for the Haras du Quesnay racing stable of Willie K. Vanderbilt.

== Racing career ==
Top jockey Earl Sande was aboard for the Kentucky Derby in which good luck was on his side. A downpour just before racetime turned Churchill Downs into a quagmire that perfectly suited Flying Ebony, who won the 51st running of the Derby by one and a half lengths. This Derby was the first ever to be broadcast on the radio.

Flying Ebony raced three more times after the Derby without winning and was retired to stud duty.

== Retirement and stud record ==
His son Flying Heels, who raced for owner Gifford Cochran, won multiple top races such as the Pimlico Futurity, Remsen Handicap, Manhattan Handicap, and two editions of the Carter Handicap. Flying Ebony was also the sire of Dark Secret, the Wheatley Stable's colt who won several important races including two editions of the Jockey Club Gold Cup. Flying Ebony was eventually sold to Californian Charles Elliot Perkins, who stood him at his stud at his Alisal Ranch near Santa Barbara. Flying Ebony was humanely put down in the summer of 1943.

Flying Ebony's 1925 Kentucky Derby Trophy is on display at the Kentucky Derby Museum.
