= Zev (horse) =

American-bred Thoroughbred racehorse

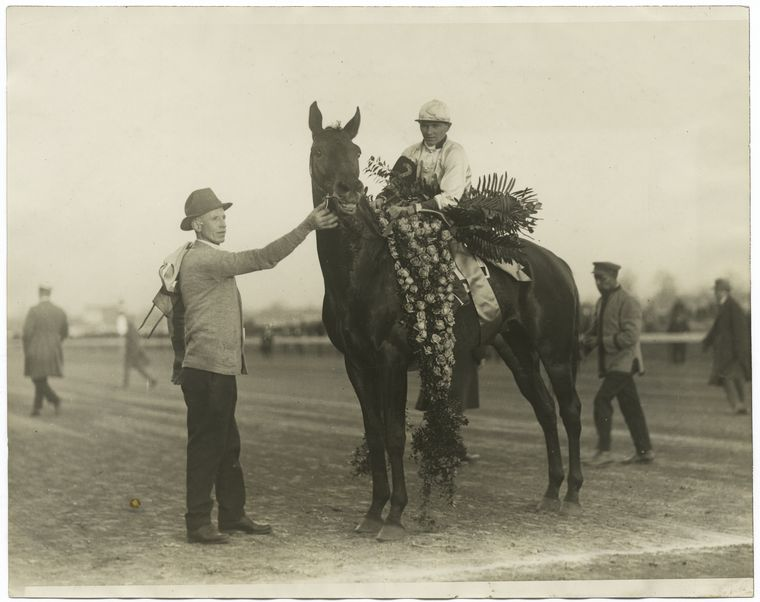
- Zev with jockey Earl Sande
- Sire: The Finn
- Grandsire: Ogden
- Dam: Miss Kearney
- Damsire: Planudes
- Sex: Stallion
- Foaled: 1920
- Died: 1943 (aged 22–23)
- Country: United States
- Colour: Brown
- Breeder: John E. Madden
- Owner: Rancocas Stable Silks: White, Green Collar and Cuffs, White Cap.
- Trainer: Sam Hildreth & David J. Leary
- Record: 43: 23-8-5
- Earnings: $313,639

Major wins
- Hopeful Stakes (1922); Grand Union Hotel Stakes (1922); Paumonok Handicap (1923); Withers Stakes (1923); Lawrence Realization Stakes (1923); Queens County Handicap (1923); Match race – defeated Epsom Derby champ, Papyrus (1923) American Classic Race wins: Kentucky Derby (1923); Belmont Stakes (1923)

Awards
- U.S. Champion 2-Year-Old Colt (1922); Co-U.S. Champion 3-Year-Old Colt (1923); American Horse of the Year (1923)

Honours
- United States Racing Hall of Fame (1983) #56 - Top 100 U.S. Racehorses of the 20th Century
- Last updated on September 24, 2006

Zev (1920–1943) was an American thoroughbred horse racing Champion and National Museum of Racing and Hall of Fame inductee.

== Background ==
A brown colt, Zev was sired by The Finn and was out of the mare Miss Kearney (by Planudes). Bred by the famous horseman John E. Madden, Zev was owned by the Rancocas Stable of Harry F. Sinclair, the founder of Sinclair Oil, who was a central figure in the Teapot Dome scandal and served time in prison.

Sinclair named the horse in honor of his friend and personal lawyer, Colonel James William (also known as J.W.) Zeverly.

== Racing career ==
=== 1922: Two-year-old season ===
Trained by Sam Hildreth, as a two-year-old Zev won five of his twelve races, finished second on four occasions, and was a Champion colt of 1922.

=== 1923: Three-year-old season ===
The following year, he was the dominant three-year-old in America, winning a number of important Grade I stakes races under jockey Earl Sande. Included in his victories were the Lawrence Realization Stakes and the most prestigious race in the United States, the Kentucky Derby, for which David J. Leary was credited as trainer, as he was for the Preakness Stakes, which was run before the Kentucky Derby in 1923. Zev encountered problems in the Preakness and finished 12th but came back to win the Derby and then the Belmont Stakes.

==== Zev vs. Papyrus Match Race ====
On October 20, 1923, one of the most significant match races in worldwide thoroughbred racing took place at Belmont Park on Long Island, New York with a purse of $100,000 up for grabs in a special race called the International Stakes, set to run 1 ½ miles. The two-horse race brought the Kentucky Derby winner, Zev, against the Epsom Derby winner, Papyrus. The trophy was also a special one, it was a solid cold copy of a 1707 cup, which stood 12 inches high and weighed 100 ounces. On top was an eagle with outstretched wings, with one side left to etch the winners. It was donated by The Jockey Club, and was intended for perpetual use for international competition.

Leading up to the race, there was much excitement to see the English star take on the American champion. The Boston Globe published a size comparison between the two, measuring not just their height and weight but their girth, distance between eyes, and other measurements.

A crowd estimated at close to 70,000 watched the race. The odds were 9-10 for Zev as the favorite, with Papyrus at even money. After a slow start, Zev led the whole race and eventually bounded away to win by five lengths, in a slow time of 2:35 2/5.

Zev's victory marked the first time a Kentucky Derby winner defeated an English Derby winner. His win brought his career earnings to $254,903, passing the record set by Man O' War a few years earlier. After the win, Dick Ferris, a promoter of an upcoming track near Culver City, California offered up a $100,000 match race between Zev and My Own, a race that never came to fruition.

In November, Zev won another match race, this one controversially close, against In Memoriam at Churchill Downs.

His performances in 1923 earned Zev the titles American Horse of the Year and Co-Champion Three-Year-Old Male.

=== 1924: Four-year-old season ===
After successfully campaigning as a four-year-old, Zev retired as racing's all-time leading money earner, surpassing Man o' War's record.

== Stud career ==
At stud, he proved less successful than he had on the track, at best siring two minor stakes winners (Zevson and Zida).

In 1983, Zev was inducted in the National Museum of Racing and Hall of Fame. In The Blood-Horse magazine ranking of the top 100 U.S. thoroughbred champions of the 20th Century, he was accorded 56th place.

== See also ==
- List of racehorses
