= Gifford A. Cochran =

American entrepreneur and sportsman

Gifford A. Cochran (died 1930) was an American entrepreneur and sportsman from New York City. During the latter part of the 19th century and the first decades of the 20th century, he became wealthy in the carpet making industry.

== Racing life ==
Gifford was a major owner of Thoroughbred racehorses and in 1925, with two different horses, he won two of the most prestigious races in the United States, the Kentucky Derby and the Preakness Stakes.

Cochran maintained a stable at Long Island's Belmont Park and in 1915 set up a stable in New Orleans for winter racing. In the mid-1910s, William Midgley trained for Cochran then in the early 1920s Edward Evans and later former star jockey Frank Keogh.

In August 1922, Gifford Cochran purchased Goshawk from Harry Payne Whitney for $50,000. At the time, the son of the U.S. Hall of Fame horse Whisk Broom was considered one of the best two-year-olds in the United States but he failed to perform beyond that age level. Nevertheless, Cochran owned horses that won a number of important New York races:

- Astoria Stakes - Pleione (1915)
- Gazelle Handicap - Fairy Wand (1918), Banksia (1921)
- Travers Stakes - Sun Flag (1924), Dangerous (1925)
- Tremont Stakes - Draconis (1926)
- Champagne Stakes - Healy (1928)
- Dwyer Stakes - Genie (1928)
- Westchester Handicap - Genie (1929)
- Demoiselle Stakes - The Beasel (1929)
- Manhattan Handicap - Flying Heels (1930)
- Hopeful Stakes - Epithet (1930)
- Carter Handicap - Flying Heels (1930, 1931)

However, Cochran's most remembered success came with two different horses in 1925 after Bill Duke returned to America as his trainer. Duke, a future U.S. Hall of Fame inductee had been a champion trainer in France where he had worked since 1888, notably for the Haras du Quesnay racing stable of American Willie K. Vanderbilt, a friend of Gifford Cochran. Under Dukes guidance, Gifford's colt Flying Ebony won the Kentucky Derby and another colt, Coventry, captured the Preakness Stakes. Unfortunately, Cochran's successful partnership with Bill Duke lasted only a short time as Duke died in January 1926 of pneumonia.

== Personal life ==
Gifford Cochran married Mabel Heywood Taylor, daughter of Dr. John Madison Taylor. They divorced in 1927. Their son, Gifford Cochran, Jr., was an artist who was married to actress/author Dorothy Fletcher who in the 1930s wrote novels under the pseudonym, Lady Mary Cameron.
