= Manhattan Stakes =

- Class: Grade I
- Location: Belmont Park; Elmont, New York, USA
- Inaugurated: 1867
- Race type: Thoroughbred – Flat racing

Race information
- Distance: 1 1/4 miles (10 furlongs)
- Surface: Turf
- Track: Left-handed
- Qualification: Four-year-olds & up
- Weight: Handicap
- Purse: $1,000,000

The Manhattan Stakes is an American Thoroughbred horse race raced annually at Belmont Park in Elmont, New York. It is named for Manhattan, the principal borough of the City of New York. Currently offering a purse of $1,000,000, the Grade I Manhattan Stakes is open to 4-year-olds & up, and is run on turf over the classic distance of 1 1/4 miles.

Inaugurated in 1867 at the now defunct Jerome Park Racetrack, it was there through 1894 when the racetrack closed. Moved in 1895 to Morris Park Racecourse in The Bronx, New York it remained there through 1904 when that racetrack also closed down. In 1905 the race was moved to Belmont Park.

It was contested on dirt from inception through 1970, and again in 1977, 1979 and 1988. The race was hosted by Aqueduct Racetrack in 1959 and 1961, plus between 1963 and 1967.

In winning the 1964 edition of the Manhattan Handicap, Going Abroad time of 2:26.20 set a new North American speed record for 11/2 miles on dirt.

There was no race held in 1897 and 1909 to 1913. Large fields in 1971, 1972, 1975 and 1977 saw the race divided into two divisions.

Since 1994, the race has been run on the undercard of the final leg of the U.S. Triple Crown, the Belmont Stakes.

Over the years, the Manhattan Handicap has been set at a variety of distances:

- 1867–1896, 1978 to present : 11/4 miles (10 furlongs)
- 1898–1908 : six furlongs
- 1914–1915 : seven furlongs
- 1916–1932 : 1 mile
- 1933–1958, 1960, 1962, 1963–1964, 1968–1969, 1977 : 1 1/2 miles (12 furlongs)
- 1961 : 1 5/16 miles (11 furlongs)
- 1959, 1965–1967 : 1 5/8 miles (13 furlongs)
- 1970 to 1976 : 1 3/8 miles (11 furlongs)

== Records ==
Speed record:

- 1:57.79 @ 11/4 miles on turf – Paradise Creek (1994)
- 2:26.20 @ 11/2 miles on dirt - Going Abroad (1964)

Most wins:

- 3 – Bolingbroke (1940, 1942, 1943)

Most wins by a jockey:

- 5 – Jerry D. Bailey (1986, 1999, 2000, 2003, 2005)

Most wins by a trainer:

- 8 – Chad C. Brown (2012, 2014, 2015, 2016, 2019, 2020, 2021, 2022)

Most wins by an owner:

- 4 – Harry Payne Whitney (1907, 1908, 1926, 1928)
- 4 – Townsend B. Martin (1940, 1942, 1943, 1945)
- 4 – Greentree Stable (1944, 1950, 1962, 1972)

== Winners ==
Year	Winner	Age	Jockey	Trainer	Owner	Dist. (Miles)	Time	Win$	Gr.
2026	Deterministic	5	Kendrick Carmouche	Miguel Clement	St. Elias Stables, Ken Lagone, Steven C. Duncker & Vicarage Stable	1 3/16 m	1:50.50	$550,000	G1
2025	Deterministic	4	Kendrick Carmouche	Miguel Clement	St. Elias Stables, Ken Lagone, Steven C. Duncker & Vicarage Stable	11/8 m	1:48.93	$550,000	G1
2024	Measured Time	4	William Buick	Charlie Appleby	Godolphin	13/16 m	1:51.94	$550,000	G1
2023	Up to the Mark	4	Irad Ortiz Jr.	Todd A. Pletcher	Repole Stable & St. Elias Stable	11/4 m	1:59.31	$750,000	G1
2022	Tribhuvan (FR)	6	Manny Franco	Chad C. Brown	Michael Dubb, Madaket Stables LLC, Wonder Stables, & Michael J. Caruso	11/4 m	1:59.54	$400,000	G1
2021	Domestic Spending (GB)	4	Flavien Prat	Chad C. Brown	Klaravich Stables	11/4 m	1:59.08	$400,000	G1
2020	Instilled Regard	5	Irad Ortiz Jr.	Chad C. Brown	OXO Equine LLC	11/4 m	2:02.59	$220,000	G1
2019	Bricks and Mortar	5	Irad Ortiz Jr.	Chad C. Brown	Klaravich Stables & William H. Lawrence	11/4 m	1:58.11	$535,000	G1
2018	Spring Quality	6	Edgar Prado	Graham Motion	Augustin Stable	11/4 m	1:58.58	$535,000	G1
2017	Ascend	5	José Ortiz	Graham Motion	Stone Farm & Madaket Stables (Sol Kumin)	11/4 m	1:59.97	$535,000	G1
2016	Flintshire	6	Javier Castellano	Chad C. Brown	Juddmonte Farms	11/4 m	1:58.92	$535,000	G1
2015	Slumber	7	Irad Ortiz Jr.	Chad C. Brown	Dubb/Sheep Pond/Bethlehem Stables	11/4 m	2:01.23	$535,000	G1
2014	Real Solution	5	Javier Castellano	Chad C. Brown	Ken & Sarah Ramsey	11/4 m	1:59.27	$535,000	G1
2013	Point of Entry	5	John Velazquez	C. R. McGaughey III	Phipps Stable	11/4 m	2:02.55	$300,000	G1
2012	Desert Blanc	4	Ramon Domínguez	Chad C. Brown	Swift Thoroughbreds, Inc., Mackie Racing, Vintage Thoroughbreds LLC, et al.	11/4 m	1:59.65	$300,000	G1
2011	Mission Approved	7	Jose Espinoza	Naipaul Chatterpaul	Naipaul & Terikchand Chatterpaul	11/4 m	2:06.32	$240,000	G1
2010	Winchester	5	Cornelio Velásquez	Christophe Clement	Bertram & Diana Firestone	11/4 m	1:59.46	$240,000	G1
2009	Gio Ponti	4	Garrett Gomez	Christophe Clement	Castleton Lyons	11/4 m	2:02.91	$240,000	G1
2008	Dancing Forever	5	René Douglas	C. R. McGaughey III	Phipps Stable	11/4 m	1:59.62	$240,000	G1
2007	Better Talk Now	8	Ramon Domínguez	H. Graham Motion	Bushwood Stable (Brent Johnson, Karl Barth, Chris Dwyer)	11/4 m	2:02.39	$240,000	G1
2006	Cacique	5	Edgar Prado	Robert J. Frankel	Juddmonte Farms	11/4 m	2:04.10	$240,000	G1
2005	Good Reward	4	Jerry D. Bailey	C. R. McGaughey III	Phipps Stable	11/4 m	2:00.69	$240,000	G1
2004	Meteor Storm	5	Jose Valdivia Jr.	Wallace Dollase	The Horizon Stable (M. Jarvis, G. Margolis, K. Smole, J. Conway)	11/4 m	1:59.34	$240,000	G1
2003	Denon	5	Jerry D. Bailey	Robert J. Frankel	Edmund A. Gann & Flaxman Stable	11/4 m	2:14.16	$240,000	G1
2002	Beat Hollow	5	Alex Solis	Robert J. Frankel	Juddmonte Farms	11/4 m	2:01.29	$240,000	G1
2001	Forbidden Apple	6	Corey Nakatani	Christophe Clement	Arthur I. Appleton	11/4 m	2:00.77	$240,000	G1
2000	Manndar	4	Jerry D. Bailey	C. Beau Greely	Columbine Stable (Andrea Pollack)	11/4 m	1:59.61	$240,000	G1
1999	Yagli	6	Jerry D. Bailey	William I. Mott	Allen E. Paulson	11/4 m	1:58.48	$180,000	G1
1998	Chief Bearhart	5	José A. Santos	Mark Frostad	Sam-Son Farm	11/4 m	1:58.25	$150,000	G1
1997	Ops Smile	5	Robbie Davis	William Boniface	Jim Karp, Kennard Warfield, et al.	11/4 m	1:59.00	$120,000	G1
1996	Diplomatic Jet	4	Jorge Chavez	James E. Picou	Fred W. Hooper	11/4 m	2:00.14	$120,000	G1
1995	Awad	5	Eddie Maple	David G. Donk	Ryehill Farm (James P. Ryan)	11/4 m	1:58.57	$120,000	G1
1994	Paradise Creek	5	Pat Day	William I. Mott	Nishiyama Masayuki	11/4 m	1:57.79	$90,000	G1
1993	Star of Cozzene	5	José A. Santos	Mark A. Hennig	Team Valor	11/4 m	1:58.89	$90,000	G2
1992	Sky Classic	5	Pat Day	James E. Day	Sam-Son Farm	11/4 m	2:02.42	$172,860	G2
1991	Academy Award	5	Art Madrid Jr.	Richard A. DeStasio	Peter E. Blum	11/4 m	1:59.78	$111,600	G2
1990	Phantom Breeze	4	Mike E. Smith	William I. Mott	Bertram R. Firestone	11/4 m	2:02.00	$52,110	G2
1989	Milesius	5	Richard Migliore	Thomas Skiffington	Virginia Kraft Payson	11/4 m	2:00.00	$73,440	G1
1988	Milesius	4	Chris Antley	Richard J. Lundy	Virginia Kraft Payson	11/4 m	2:04.00	$71,760	G1
1987	Silver Voice	4	Julio Pezua	Angel Penna Jr.	Lazy F Farm	11/4 m	2:01.00	$86,220	G1
1986	Danger's Hour	4	Jerry D. Bailey	MacKenzie Miller	Rokeby Stable	11/4 m	2:02.00	$73,300	G1
1985	Cool	4	Jacinto Vásquez	Angel Penna Jr.	Pin Oak Farm	11/4 m	2:02.00	$77,280	G1
1984	Win	4	Antonio Graell	Sally A. Bailie	Fredrick Ephraim	11/4 m	2:00.00	$77,520	G1
1983	Acaroid	5	Ángel Cordero Jr.	Jan H. Nerud	Tartan Stable	11/4 m	2:00.00	$72,240	G2
1982	Sprink	4	Jimmy Miranda	Gene Colandonato	Irving Paparo	11/4 m	2:01.00	$51,570	G2
1981	Match The Hatch	5	Jean-Luc Samyn	Philip G. Johnson	Kathy M. Johnson	11/4 m	2:03.00	$52,470	G2
1980	Morold	5	Eddie Maple	Michael J. Doyle	George C. Frostad	11/4 m	2:00.20	$53,910	G2
1979	Fluorescent Light	4	Jeffrey Fell	Angel Penna Sr.	Ogden Mills Phipps	11/4 m	2:04.00	$51,615	G2
1978	Fabulous Time	4	Ángel Cordero Jr.	John W. Russell	Ogden Mills Phipps	11/4 m	2:01.40	$48,690	G2
1977-1	Gentle King	4	Steve Cauthen	W. Preston King	Canam East Stable (Arthur Fouks)	11/2 m	2:28.00	$32,070	G2
1977-2	Gallivantor	5	Steve Cauthen	Joseph A. Trovato	Jack R. Hogan	11/2 m	2:28.00	$32,070	G2
1976	Caucasus	4	Fernando Toro	Charlie Whittingham	Cardiff Stock Farm	13/8 m	2:14.40	$33,930	G2
1975-1	Salt Marsh	4	Eddie Maple	Thomas J. Kelly	Brookmeade Stable	13/8 m	2:16.60	$33,600	G2
1975-2	Snow Knight	4	Jorge Velásquez	MacKenzie Miller	Windfields Farm	13/8 m	2:16.20	$33,990	G2
1974	Golden Don	4	Jean Cruguet	Kay Erik Jensen	Archie Donaldson	13/8 m	2:19.80	$35,970	G2
1973	London Company	3	Laffit Pincay Jr.	LeRoy Jolley	Chance Hill Farm	13/8 m	2:15.60	$36,120	G2
1972-1	Star Envoy	4	Jorge Velásquez	Everett W. King	Lloyd I. Miller	13/8 m	2:13.00	$28,110	
1972-2	Ruritania	3	Ron Turcotte	John M. Gaver Sr.	Greentree Stable	13/8 m	2:14.00	$28,110	
1971-1	Happy Way	4	Heliodoro Gustines	Nick Combest	Clinton LaGrosa	13/8 m	2:16.00	$27,390	
1971-2	Big Shot II	6	Jorge Tejeira	Pancho Martin	Sigmund Sommer	13/8 m	2:16.40	$27,990	
1970	Shelter Bay	4	Robert Woodhouse	Flint S. Schulhofer	Tartan Stable	13/8 m	2:14.60	$40,300	
1969	Harem Lady	5	Eddie Belmonte	H. Allen Jerkens	Hobeau Farm	11/2 m	2:30.20	$34,580	
1968	Quicken Tree	5	Bill Hartack	Clyde Turk	Louis R. Rowan & Wheelock Whitney Jr.	11/2 m	2:28.00	$37,895	
1967	Munden Point	5	Bobby Ussery	Ira Hanford	Loren P. Guy	15/8 m	2:41.00	$37,180	
1966	Moontrip	5	Eddie Belmonte	Kay Erik Jensen	Ewing Kauffman	15/8 m	2:42.00	$38,545	
1965	Roman Brother	4	Braulio Baeza	Burley Parke	Harbor View Farm	15/8 m	2:43.20	$36,790	
1964	Going Abroad	4	Ray Broussard	Joseph H. Pierce Jr.	Edward Seltzer	11/2 m	2:26.20	$37,765	
1963	Smart	4	Eldon Nelson	Henry S. Clark	Christiana Stables	11/2 m	2:28.00	$38,220	
1962	Tutankhamen	4	Braulio Baeza	John M. Gaver Sr.	Greentree Stable	11/2 m	2:28.00	$37,765	
1961	Nickel Boy	6	Ismael Valenzuela	Walter A. Kelley	Elmendorf Farm	15/16 m	2:10.00	$36,985	
1960	Don Poggio	4	Sam Boulmetis	Robert L. Dotter	Gustave Ring	11/2 m	2:29.00	$36,255	
1959	Round Table	5	Bill Shoemaker	William Molter	Kerr Stable	15/8 m	2:42.00	$37,320	
1958	Warhead	3	Eddie Arcaro	Kay Erik Jensen	Mabel C. Scholtz	11/2 m	2:28.00	$36,515	
1957	Reneged	4	Bobby Ussery	Homer Pardue	Woodley Lane Farm (Joe Straus, Lafayette Ward, Steven B. Wilson)	11/2 m	2:29.00	$37,300	
1956	Flying Fury	4	Ted Atkinson	Woody Stephens	Cain Hoy Stable	11/2 m	2:30.20	$37,600	
1955	Social Outcast	4	Eric Guerin	William C. Winfrey	Alfred G. Vanderbilt II	11/2 m	2:30.00	$22,200	
1954	High Gun	3	Eddie Arcaro	Max Hirsch	King Ranch	11/2 m	2:30.00	$24,150	
1953	Jampol	4	Jorge Contreras	Max Kahlbaum	Max Kahlbaum	11/2 m	2:30.00	$23,300	
1952	Lone Eagle	6	Con Errico	Kay Erik Jensen	Gustave Ring	11/2 m	2:30.00	$23,950	
1951	County Delight	4	Eric Guerin	James E. Ryan	Rokeby Stable	11/2 m	2:29.00	$19,550	
1950	One Hitter	4	Ted Atkinson	John M. Gaver Sr.	Greentree Stable	11/2 m	2:29.20	$20,800	
1949	Donor	5	Warren Mehrtens	George P. Odom	Elizabeth Howe	11/2 m	2:28.00	$20,400	
1948	Loyal Legion	4	Ted Atkinson	Oscar White	Walter M. Jeffords	11/2 m	2:29.00	$19,600	
1947	Rico Monte	5	Eddie Arcaro	Horatio Luro	W. Arnold Hanger	11/2 m	2:29.00	$19,250	
1946	Stymie	5	Basil James	Hirsch Jacobs	Ethel D. Jacobs	11/2 m	2:29.00	$20,050	
1945	Bankrupt	4	Arnold Kirkland	Walter Burrows	Townsend B. Martin	11/2 m	2:31.00	$12,475	
1944	Devil Diver	5	Eddie Arcaro	John M. Gaver Sr.	Greentree Stable	11/2 m	2:36.00	$10,595	
1943	Bolingbroke	6	Steve Brooks	Walter Burrows	Townsend B. Martin	11/2 m	2:30.00	$7,775	
1942	Bolingbroke	5	Herb Lindberg	Walter Burrows	Townsend B. Martin	11/2 m	2:27.00	$8,175	
1941	Fenelon	4	James Stout	James Fitzsimmons	Belair Stud	11/2 m	2:29.00	$8,175	
1940	Bolingbroke	3	Sidney Hebert	Walter Burrows	Townsend B. Martin	11/2 m	2:30.00	$7,725	
1939	Sorteado	4	Leon Haas	Tom Smith	Charles S. Howard	11/2 m	2:28.00	$6,675	
1938	Isolater	5	James Stout	James Fitzsimmons	Belair Stud	11/2 m	2:31.00	$4,300	
1937	Count Stone	4	Frank Kopel	Stephen J. Lawler	Arthur H. Waterman	11/2 m	2:30.00	$4,230	
1936	Action	7	John Gilbert	Hirsch Jacobs	Ethel D. Jacobs	11/2 m	2:31.20	$4,450	
1935	Count Arthur	3	Wayne D. Wright	Frank S. Hackett	Fannie Hertz	11/2 m	2:30.00	$4,430	
1934	Dark Secret	5	Charles Kurtsinger	George Tappen	Wheatley Stable	11/2 m	2:29.20	$4,239	
1933	Dark Secret	4	Raymond Workman	George Tappen	Wheatley Stable	11/2 m	2:30.00	$2,560	
1932	Larranaga	3	Raymond Workman	Edward J. Bennett	Anall Stable (Allan A. Ryan)	1 m	1:36.80	$2,875	
1931	Mr. Sponge	4	Mack Garner	Henry McDaniel	Joseph E. Widener	1 m	1:35.80	$3,325	
1930	Flying Heels	3	Willie Kelsay	Henry McDaniel	Gifford A. Cochran	1 m	1:37.40	$3,400	
1929	Ironsides	4	Linus McAtee	George M. Odom	Robert L. Gerry Sr.	1 m	1:36.00	$6,675	
1928	Victorian	3	Laverne Fator	James Rowe Sr.	Harry Payne Whitney	1 m	1:37.60	$3,800	
1927	Valorous	3	George Fields	Howard Oots	Hamilton Farm	1 m	1:37.40	$3,975	
1926	Croyden	3	Linus McAtee	James Rowe Sr.	Harry Payne Whitney	1 m	1:38.80	$3,350	
1925	Pepp	4	Harold Thurber	Max Hirsch	George W. Loft	1 m	1:37.40	$3,575	
1924	Sarazen	3	John Maiben	Max Hirsch	Fair Stable	1 m	1:36.40	$3,500	
1923	Little Chief	4	Earl Sande	Sam Hildreth	Rancocas Stable (Harry F. Sinclair)	1 m	1:35.80	$3,425	
1922	Little Chief	3	Laverne Fator	Sam Hildreth	Rancocas Stable (Harry F. Sinclair)	1 m	1:38.00	$3,100	
1921	Yellow Hand	4	C. H. Miller	A. J. Goldsborough	Charles A. Stoneham	1 m	1:36.00	$2,925	
1920	Naturalist	6	Clarence Kummer	Thomas Welsh	Joseph E. Widener	1 m	1:36.00	$2,775	
1919	Lucullite	4	Laverne Fator	Sam Hildreth	Sam Hildreth	1 m	1:36.60	$2,800	
1918	Naturalist	4	Willie Knapp	Thomas Welsh	Joseph E. Widener	1 m	1:37.80	$2,350	
1917	Stargazer	3	Merritt C. Buxton	Walter B. Jennings	A. Kingsley Macomber	1 m	1:39.20	$1,420	
1916	The Finn	4	Andy Schuttinger	Edward W. Heffner	Harry C. Hallenbeck	1 m	1:39.40	$1,430	
1915	The Finn	3	Tommy Davies	Edward W. Heffner	Harry C. Hallenbeck	7 F	1:26.00	$1,195	
1914	Stromboli	3	Clarence Turner	James Rowe Sr.	August Belmont Jr.	7 F	1:24.00	$1,245	
1913	Race not held								
1912	No races held due to the Hart–Agnew Law.								
1911	No races held due to the Hart–Agnew Law.								
1909	-1910	Race not held							
1908	Delirium	3	Charles Gilbert	A. Jack Joyner	Harry Payne Whitney	6 F	1:11.60	$1,570	
1907	Baby Wolf	3	Eddie Dugan	A. Jack Joyner	Harry Payne Whitney	6 F	1:12.20	$2,500	
1906	Roseben	5	Willie Shaw	Frank D. Weir	Davy C. Johnson	6 F	1:12.20	$2,530	
1905	Roseben	4	Frank O'Neill	Frank D. Weir	Davy C. Johnson	6 F	1:11.60	$2,120	
1904	Broadcloth	3	William Crimmins	Robert Tucker	Samuel S. Brown	6 F	1:10.25	$2,080	
1903	Castalian	3	Tommy Burns	Preston M. Burch	Francis R. Hitchcock	6 F	1:09.00	$2,090	
1902	King Pepper	4	Arthur Redfern	Crit Davis	Pepper Stable (James E. Pepper)	6 F	1:12.00	$2,140	
1901	Musette	4	Otto Wonderly	William Hayward Sr.	J. S. Ferguson	6 F	1:12.00	$1,510	
1900	Firearm	5	Tommy Burns	John Boden	John Boden	6 F	1:10.00	$1,940	
1899	Firearm	4	Frank O'Leary	John Boden	John Boden	6 F	1:08.75	$2,280	
1898	Sanders	3	Henry Spencer	Charley Hill	F. V. Alexander	6 F	1:11.00	$2,520	
1897	Race not held								
1896	Belmar	4	Tod Sloan	Edward Feakes	Preakness Stables	11/4 m	2:07.50	$1,450	
1895	Henry of Navarre	4	Henry Griffin	John J. Hyland	August Belmont Jr.	11/4 m	2:07.00	$3,500	
1894	Sir Excess	3	Willie Simms	John W. Rogers	John W. Rogers	11/4 m	2:09.75	$2,000	
1893	info not found								
1892	Banquet	5	John Lamley	Hardy Campbell Jr.	Michael F. Dwyer	11/4 m	2:07.50	$2,000	
1891	Bermuda	4	Tony Hamilton	Byron McClelland	Byron McClelland	11/4 m	2:07.50	$2,000	
1890	Raceland	5	Edward Garrison	James Rowe Sr.	August Belmont Sr.	11/4 m	2:11.00	$2,000	
1889	Los Angeles	4	Pike Barnes	Robert E. Campbell	Santa Anita Stable	11/4 m	2:16.75	$1,500	
1888	Firenze	4	Edward Garrison	Matthew Byrnes	James B. A. Haggin	11/4 m	2:13.25	$1,500	
1887	Lady Primrose	3	William Donohue	James Rowe Sr.	August Belmont Sr.	11/4 m	2:13.00	$1,000	
1886	Electric	3	Rafferty		Locust Stable	11/4 m	2:11.00	$1,000	
1885	Pontiac	4	Harris Onley	Matthew Byrnes	Rancocas Stable (Pierre Lorillard)	11/4 m	2:14.00	$1,000	
1884	Heel and Toe	4	Meaton		Mr. Kelso	11/4 m	2:14.00	$500	
1883	Aella	5	Brennan	R. Wyndham Walden	George L. Lorillard	11/4 m	2:17.00	$500	
1882	Bootjack	4	Jim McLaughlin	James Rowe Sr.	Dwyer Brothers	11/4 m	2:20.50	$500	
1881	Parole	8	Edward Feakes	William Brown	Pierre Lorillard IV	11/4 m	2:11.00	$500	
1880	Harold	4	Tom Costello	R. Wyndham Walden	George L. Lorillard	11/4 m	2:12.25	$500	
1879	Harold	3	Tom Costello	R. Wyndham Walden	George L. Lorillard	11/4 m	2:12.25	$500	
1878	Garrick	3	William Barrett	William Brown	Pierre Lorillard IV	11/4 m	2:11.75	$400	
1877	Inspiration	6	Harry Blaylock		Mr. Smith	11/4 m	2:15.00	$500	
1876	Virginius	3	John Spellman	David McDaniel	David McDaniel	11/4 m	2:17.50	$500	
1875	Piccolo	4	George Evans		Edward A. Clabaugh	11/4 m	2:14.25	$500	
1874	Mate	5	William Hayward Sr.	William Hayward Sr.	Milton H. Sanford	11/4 m	2:11.75	$500	
1873	Preakness	6	William Hayward Sr.	William Hayward Sr.	Milton H. Sanford	11/4 m	2:13.00	$500	
1872	Fanchon	4	Hazzard		J. O'Donnel	11/4 m	2:13.00	$500	
1871	Ortolan	5			Carroll & Coar	11/4 m	2:20.00	$500	
1870	Corsican	5	Robinson		Bacon & Holland	11/4 m	2:15.25	$500	
1869	General Duke	4	Granville	Andrew Thompson	J. O'Donnell	11/4 m	2:14.75	$500	
1868	R. B. Connolly	5	Hennessy		J. O'Donnell	11/4 m	2:14.75	$500	
1867	Enchantress	4	Davison		T. B. Read	11/4 m	2:12.25	$700	
