= William B. Duke =

Horse trainer

Personal information
- Born: December 5, 1857 Wellsville, New York, USA
- Died: January 26, 1926 (aged 68) Wellsville, New York, USA
- Occupation: Trainer

Horse racing career
- Sport: Horse racing

Major racing wins
- France: Prix du President de la Republique (1903); Grand Prix de Deauville (1904, 1906, 1921); Critérium International (1905, 1911); Critérium de Maisons-Laffitte (1905, 1907, 1911, 1920); Prix de la Forêt (1905, 1911, 1924); Prix Morny (1905, 1909, 1910); Prix Lupin (1906, 1920); Prix Kergorlay (1904, 1906, 1909, 1910); Prix Hocquart (1906); Prix Monarque (1906); Prix du Conseil Municipal (1906); La Coupe d'Or (1906); Grand Prix de Saint-Cloud (1906, 1908, 1910, 1924); Prix Boiard (1907); Prix des Sablons (1907); Prix Delatre (1908, 1909); Prix Daru (1909, 1924); Prix la Rochette (1910); Prix Greffulhe (1914); Prix du Gros Chêne (1919, 1924) French Classics wins: Prix du Jockey Club (1906, 1908, 1909, 1919, 1924); Prix Royal-Oak (1906, 1910); Poule d'Essai des Poulains (1919) United States: Travers Stakes (1925), Initial Handicap (1925) American Classics wins: Kentucky Derby (1925); Preakness Stakes (1925)

Racing awards
- French Champion Thoroughbred Trainer by wins (1906, 1908, 1909, 1910, 1911)

Honours
- U. S. Racing Hall of Fame (1956)

Significant horses
- Maintenon, Oversight, Prestige, Pot au Feu, Coventry, Flying Ebony

William B. Duke (December 5, 1857 - January 26, 1926) was a U. S. Racing Hall of Fame trainer of Thoroughbred racehorses who won eight French Classic Races, was a five-time national champion trainer in France and, after returning to the United States in late 1924, won the 1925 Kentucky Derby and the 1925 Preakness Stakes.

Little more than a year after he returned to the United States, William Duke died at his home in Wellsville, New York on January 26, 1926.
