= Sir Martin =

American-bred Thoroughbred racehorse

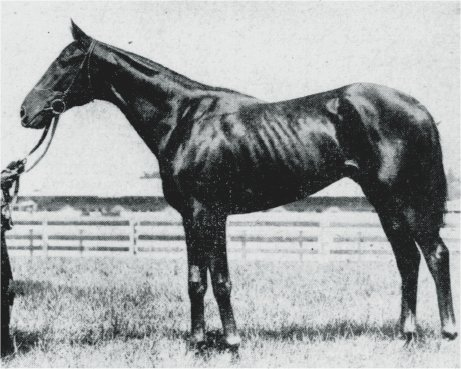
- Sir Martin in 1908 as a two-year-old.
- Sire: Ogden
- Grandsire: Kilwarlin
- Dam: Lady Sterling
- Damsire: Hanover
- Sex: Stallion
- Foaled: 1906
- Died: 1930 (aged 23–24)
- Country: United States
- Colour: Chestnut
- Breeder: John E. Madden
- Owner: 1) John E. Madden (1906-1908); 2) Louis Winans (1908-1920); 3) John E. Madden (1920-1930)
- Trainer: 1) John E. Madden (1907-1908); 2) Joseph Cannon (1909-1912)
- Record: 13: 8-4-0 (US), 19: 5-0-1 (UK)
- Earnings: $78,560 (US)

Major wins
- National Stallion Stakes (1908); Great American Stakes (1908); Great Trial Stakes (1908); Double Event Stakes (part 2) (1908); Saratoga Special Stakes (1908); Flatbush Stakes (1908); International race wins: Wednesday Welter Handicap (1909); Challenge Stakes (1909); Durham Stakes (1909); Coronation Cup (1910); Ellesmere Handicap (1913)

Awards
- American Champion Two-Year-Old Colt (1908)

Sir Martin (1906–1930) was a Thoroughbred racehorse that was foaled in 1906 in Lexington, Kentucky at Hamburg Place, the stud farm of noted turfman and horse trainer John E. Madden. Sir Martin was a half brother to the first Triple Crown winner Sir Barton, and he raced in the United States, Great Britain and France. Sir Martin was the betting favorite for the 1909 Epsom Derby, but stumbled and threw his jockey at the Tattenham Corner turn, allowing King Edward VII's horse Minoru to win.

== Pedigree ==
Sir Martin was sired by the imported British stallion, Ogden, who had been imported as a foal with his dam Oriole to Marcus Daly's Bitteroot Farm in Montana. Ogden was purchased by John Madden in 1901 and stood at Hamburg Place Stud in Lexington, Kentucky. Sir Martin's dam Lady Sterling was a daughter of Hanover and was also the dam of Sir Barton. Sir Martin inherited the deep chestnut coloring of his damsire, Hanover, and had a prominent white blaze on his fore head and one white sock on his left hind foot.

== Racing in the United States ==
John Madden retained ownership of Sir Martin throughout his two-year-old season in the United States and was also his principal trainer during this time. Sir Martin was a promising two-year-old, winning the 1908 Great American Stakes at Gravesend Race Track and the Flatbush Stakes at Sheepshead Bay for Madden. Sir Martin was the top male two-year-old earner of 1908 based on purse winnings of $78,560 and was consequently named as the historical American Champion Two-Year-Old Colt of 1908. Madden sold Sir Martin at the end of the 1908 racing season for $70,000 to Louis Winans, a Scotsman that Madden had sold several horses to previously and who had interests in European Thoroughbred racing.

== Racing in the United Kingdom ==
=== 1909 Epsom Derby ===
Sir Martin found early success overseas during his three-year-old season, winning the Wednesday Welter Handicap held at Newmarket in May 1909 shortly after arriving in Britain. Before the start of the Epsom Derby, Sir Martin was the clear betting favorite, garnering approximately $300,000 in bets from American spectators alone and going off at 3:1 odds. The weather that day was extremely wet, with the race being run in a slight drizzle. Sir Martin quickly moved to overtake the leaders, Brooklands and Louviers, at a perilous turn called Tattenham Corner. As he rounded the turn, he was crowded by the other horses (possibly by Bayardo), crossing his legs, and throwing his jockey Henry "Skeets" Martin over the rail. Sir Martin was uninjured and continued the race riderless, but he was officially recorded as not finishing. Sir Martin's jockey escaped with a cut forehead from being trampled by the other horses but ultimately survived his injuries. The Americans may have been upset at Sir Martin's defeat, but the ecstatic British crowd soon stormed the track to celebrate the victory of Minoru, the first horse owned by a reigning monarch to win the Epsom Derby.

=== Later career ===
Sir Martin followed the Epsom Derby failure with an unplaced finish in the Royal Hunt Cup at Ascot and a second in the Grand Prix de Deauville in France. He beat Priscillian to win the 1909 Challenge Stakes and won the Durham Stakes, but he finished third in the Cambridgeshire Handicap to complete his three-year-old season. Returning at age four, Sir Martin's biggest victory was in the 1910 Coronation Cup in a field of nine horses, winning in a canter from Bachelor's Double. Sir Martin did not enter the Ascot Gold Cup or any other races that year possibly due to injury. He was injured soon after a trial run for the City and Suburban Handicap as a five-year-old and was withdrawn from racing for the rest of the season. He did not win a race in 1912 and at age seven won the Ellesmere Handicap in Manchester.

== Stud career ==
=== The blood of Hanover ===
Sir Martin was retired from racing in 1913 and his first season as a breeding stallion in the U.K., with Winans retaining ownership, was in 1914 when his services were advertised for the Lordship Stud. Sir Martin was not considered a good sire in England, but his recent status as a "half-breed" in the British stud book thwarted his chances of breeding with quality mares. The 1914 passage of the Jersey Act was intended to prevent horses with suspect bloodlines (Thoroughbred crosses) from being entered into the British General Stud Book. The Jersey Act was primarily intended to prevent American stallions from becoming prominent studs in England. This was due in part to the pervasiveness of the sire Lexington in American bloodlines, a horse whose female lineage might have not been completely Thoroughbred. While Sir Martin's male line came from certifiable British stock, his female lineage traced to Lexington through his damsire Hanover, thereby excluding him from choice matches.

=== Return to Hamburg Place ===
John Madden repurchased Sir Martin in late 1919 as a replacement for Sir Martin's ailing sire, Ogden. Sir Martin returned to the United States in 1920 and remained at Hamburg Place Stud as a breeding stallion until his death in 1930. In Kent Hollingsworth's biography of John Madden, Madden is described as having a sentimental attachment to the old stallion, considering him to be one of the two (the other being Grey Lag) best horses he ever bred. Madden died in November 1929, but as part of his will, Sir Martin was not sold and was allowed to remain on the farm as a pensioner. Sir Martin is buried in the famous Hamburg Place equine cemetery in Lexington.

== Progeny ==
While Sir Martin did produce some stakes winners in the United Kingdom and the United States, his contribution to Thoroughbred genetics was neither overwhelming or lasting. He sired 16 stakes winners in America. Most of his notable sons were geldings, with his biggest winners being Spinach (b. 1927), who in 1930, won the Huron Handicap, Potomac Handicap, Havre de Grace Handicap, Latonia Championship Stakes, Riggs Handicap, and in 1935 the Chevy Chase Steeplechase Handicap and $127,320. Also Joy Smoke (b. 1921), who won the 1925 Washington Handicap, Thanksgiving Handicap, National Handicap, Windsor Hotel Cup Handicap and in 1926 the Toronto Cup Handicap, Statler Hotel Handicap and the Century Handicap and $100,045. His son Healy won the 1928 Champagne Stakes and the 1929 Empire City Derby and Mount Kisco Stakes. Another son called Star Lore (also called Our General) won the 1924 Cowdin Stakes and was himself a sire of a few stakes winners. Sir Martin's European progeny produced stakes winners with his Irish daughter, Martha Snow, producing the 1927 American Champion Three-Year-Old Filly, Nimba, and his daughter Venturesome producing Diapason, a noted long-distance runner in Britain.
