= John E. Madden =

American racehorse owner

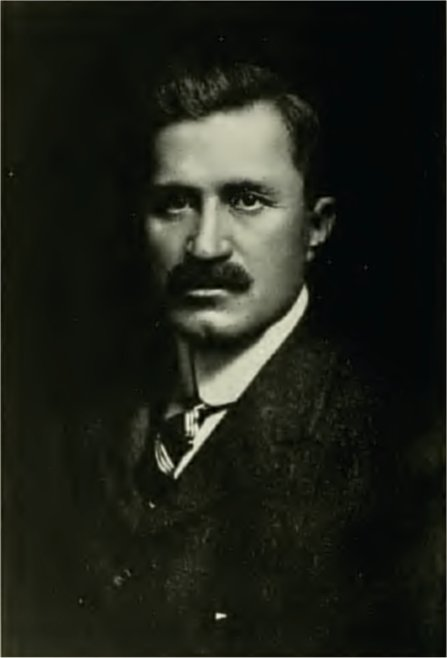
- Born: John Edward Madden; December 28, 1856; Bethlehem, Pennsylvania
- Died: November 3, 1929 (aged 72); New York City, New York
- Occupations: Athlete; Businessman; Racehorse owner/breeder/trainer

Signature
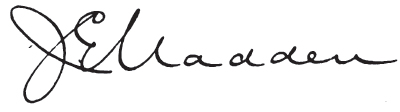

John Edward Madden (December 28, 1856 – November 3, 1929) was a prominent American Thoroughbred and Standardbred owner, breeder and trainer in the late nineteenth and early twentieth century. He owned Hamburg Place Stud in Lexington, Kentucky and bred five Kentucky Derby and Belmont Stakes winners.

He was inducted into the National Racing Hall of Fame posthumously in 1983. He was also inducted into the Harness Racing Hall of Fame for his contributions to the sport as a trainer, breeder and owner. He is the only person to be inducted into both the Harness and Thoroughbred Halls of Fame. He was also a businessman, who invested in corn refining.

== Early life ==
John E. Madden was born on December 28, 1856 in Bethlehem, Pennsylvania to Patrick and Catherine (McKee) Madden, who were Irish immigrants from Roscommon. Madden's father died in 1860, which resulted in hardship for the family. Young Madden often had to rely on his wits and athleticism to survive. He worked for four years in the local steel mills as a teenager and often fought in prizefighting as a young man to earn money. Boasting an athletic build, at nearly six feet tall and weighing 180 pounds, Madden excelled in baseball, running and broad jumping. By the age of 16, he had developed an interest in trotters.

== Harness racing ==
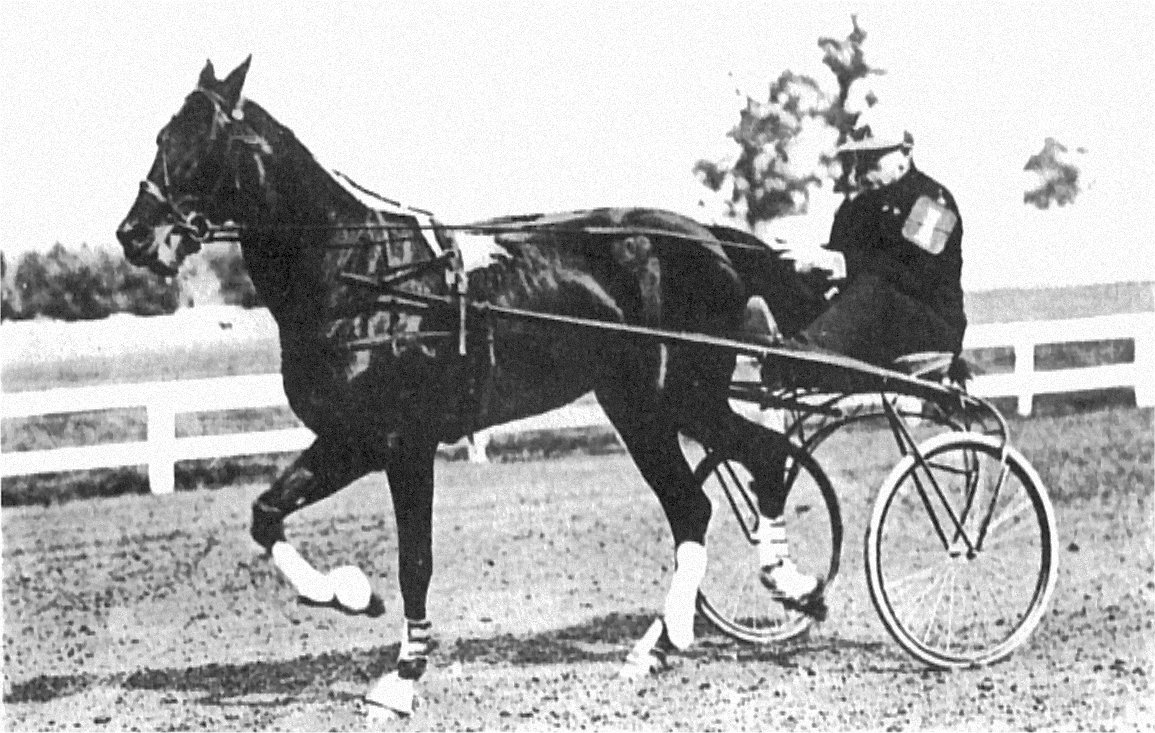
Champion trotting horse, Siliko in 1906, before winning Kentucky Futurity.

Adept at recognizing subtle differences in gait and performance in Standardbreds, both pacers and trotters, from his time driving and training horses, Madden soon amassed a small fortune from buying promising but unseasoned animals, at low prices, developing them into winners and selling them at a profit. By the time he was thirty, he had made $150,000 through his dealings. He said, "Better to sell and repent than keep and resent." Madden notably owned Class Leader, who set a track record at the Cleveland Grand Circuit Race in 1887, Robert McGregor and Siliko. By 1890, Madden realized that Thoroughbred racing was attracting higher purse values than harness racing, and he gradually shifted his interests. Into the 1900s, he still owned and trained a few Standardbreds.

== Thoroughbred racing ==
=== Hamburg, the horse ===
John Madden moved to Lexington, Kentucky in 1889, where he lived at the well-known Phoenix Hotel. He applied his business and horse knowledge to Thoroughbreds, gradually building a reputation in Kentucky as an astute horseman. He purchased Hamburg in 1896 for $1,200 from Col. Enright of Elmendorf Farm and set about developing the unruly colt into an exceptional racehorse. He won the 1897 Great Eastern Handicap at a 135-pound handicap weight, a first for a juvenile. Hamburg won 12 of his 16 starts at age two, winning $38,595 for Madden. The owner sold the horse to Marcus Daly in 1897 for $40,001, setting a record for a two-year-old in training.

=== Hamburg Place ===
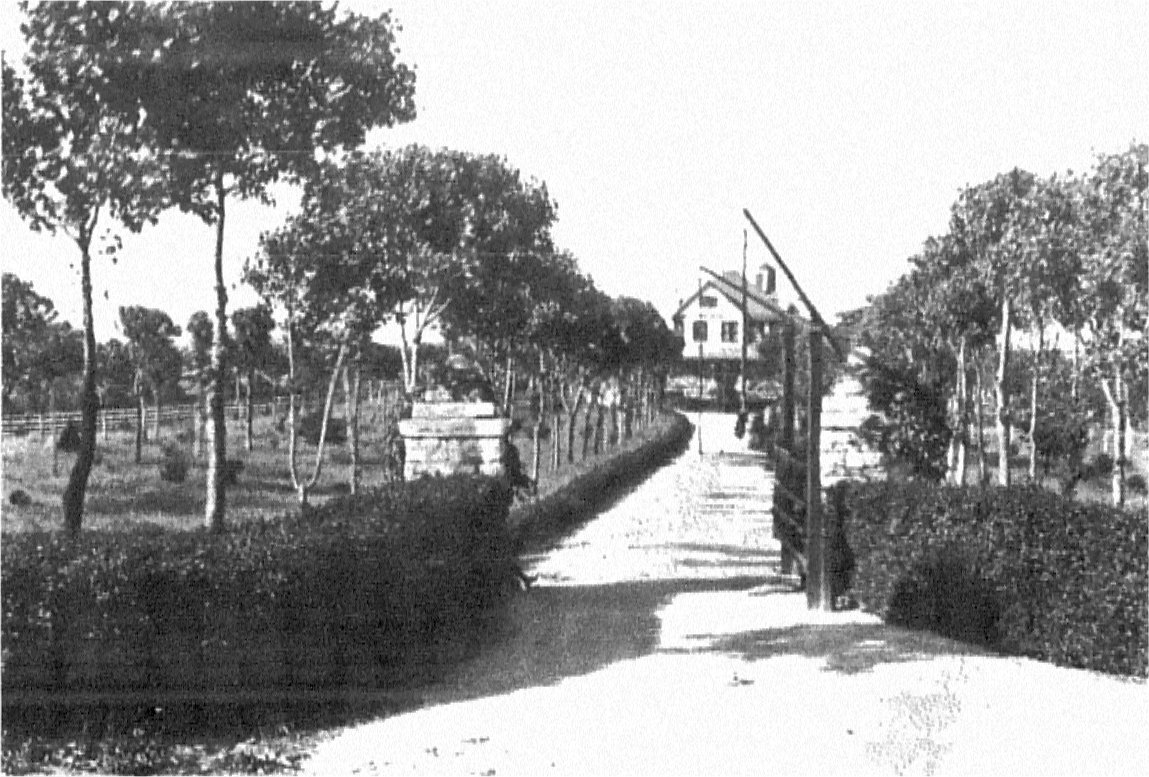
Hamburg Place entryway in 1911.

Madden used the proceeds to purchase 235 acres (which he eventually expanded to 2,000 acres) of land east of Lexington on Winchester Pike. He named his breeding farm Hamburg Place, in honor of the horse that funded the acquisition. Formerly owned by the family of Lucretia Hart, who married Henry Clay, Sr., the land was called Overton Farm.

Madden made Hamburg Place the center of his breeding operations from 1897 until his death in 1929. He bred 14 champion racehorses, including five Kentucky Derby winners (Old Rosebud, Sir Barton, Paul Jones, Zev and Flying Ebony), four Belmont Stakes winners (The Finn, Grey Lag, Zev and Joe Madden) and the first Triple Crown winner Sir Barton. Madden was the leading breeder in the United States from 1917 to 1923 and 1925, mostly due to the success of Plaudit and Madden's imported British stallions Star Shoot and Ogden. Madden also bred Trigger, Princess Doreen, King James, Emotion, Southern Maid, Flora Fina, and Sir Martin.

==== Equine Cemetery ====
Starting in 1908, Madden began burying his most prized broodmares, stallions and trotting horses in a small horseshoe-shaped cemetery on the grounds of Hamburg Place. Madden's grandson, Preston Madden, buried a few Thoroughbreds in the cemetery during the 1970s. The cemetery is one of the oldest dedicated to racehorses in the United States. The cemetery was moved from its original location in 2005 to make way for development, but has since been reopened to allow public access.

Horses buried in the cemetery include: Standardbreds:

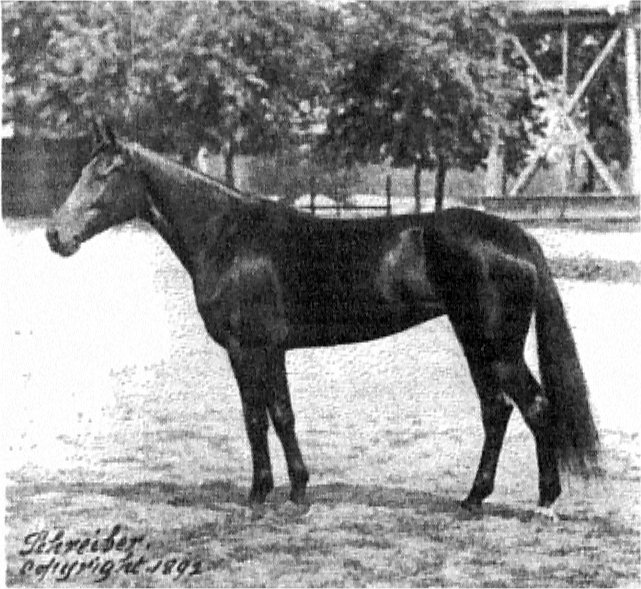
Nancy Hanks in 1892.

- Nancy Hanks (1886–1915), set a U.S. harness racing record on September 28, 1892, by trotting a mile in 2 minutes and 4 seconds; she ran undefeated and was inducted into the Harness Racing Hall of Fame.
- Silicon (1890–1913), dam of Siliko.
- Major Delmar (1897–1912), a gelding.
- Hamburg Belle (1902 – November 10, 1909), Hall of Fame trotting mare that set several world records in early 1900s.
- Siliko (1903–1926), stallion.

Thoroughbreds:

- Ida Pickwick (1888–1908), granddam of Old Rosebud
- Imp (1894–1909), 1899 Suburban Handicap winner, dam of Faust
- Ogden (1894–1923), imported British stallion, sire of The Finn and Sir Martin.
- Plaudit (1895–1919), 1898 Kentucky Derby winner, sire of King James, among others.
- Star Shoot (1898–1919), imported Irish stallion that was a five-time leading sire in the U.S.
- Lady Sterling (1899–1920), dam of Sir Martin and Sir Barton
- Miss Kearney (1906–1925), dam of Zev
- Sir Martin (1906–1930), Thoroughbred stallion.
- Princess Mary (1917–1926), dam of Flying Ebony
- Springtime (d. 1930s), a polo pony
- T.V. Lark (1957–1975), leading U.S. sire in 1974.
- Pink Pigeon (1964–1976), a broodmare
- Bel Sheba (1970–1995), the dam of Alysheba

== Training career ==
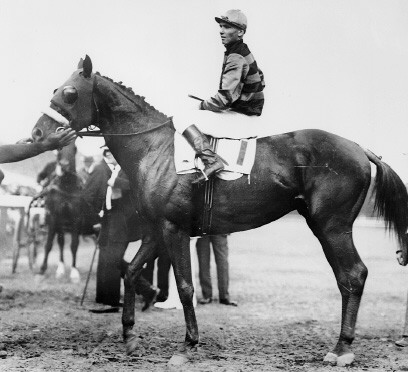
Sir Barton, pictured in 1919 with jockey Johnny Loftus, was the first Triple Crown winner.

Madden was an active trainer from 1888 to 1912, conditioning a total of eight champion Thoroughbred horses. He was the nation's leading trainer from 1901 to 1903. During his training and breeding career, Madden mentored William Collins Whitney, a former Secretary of the Navy and fellow Thoroughbred enthusiast. At Madden's urging, Whitney bought the stallion Hamburg in 1900 after Marcus Daly's death, paying $60,000. Madden sold many other of his horses to Whitney.

After Whitney fired the trainer Sam Hildreth due to perceived poor performance, he persuaded Madden to train his horses, although the latter was reluctant. A well-known legend about Madden said that Hildreth, angered and drunk, was beating Madden about the head with a cane until an irate Madden pinned him to the floor and made him apologize for the insult.

Madden most notably trained:

- Hamburg, Champion 2-year-old Male (1897)
- Nasturtium, Champion 2-year-old Male (1901)
- Blue Girl, Champion 3-year-old Female (1902)
- Irish Lad, Champion 2-year-old Male (1902)
- Salvidere, Champion 2-year-old Male (1906)
- Tangle, Champion 3-year-old Female (1906)
- Sir Martin, half brother to Sir Barton, Champion 2-year-old Male (1908)
- King James, Champion Handicap Male (1909)

== Personal life ==
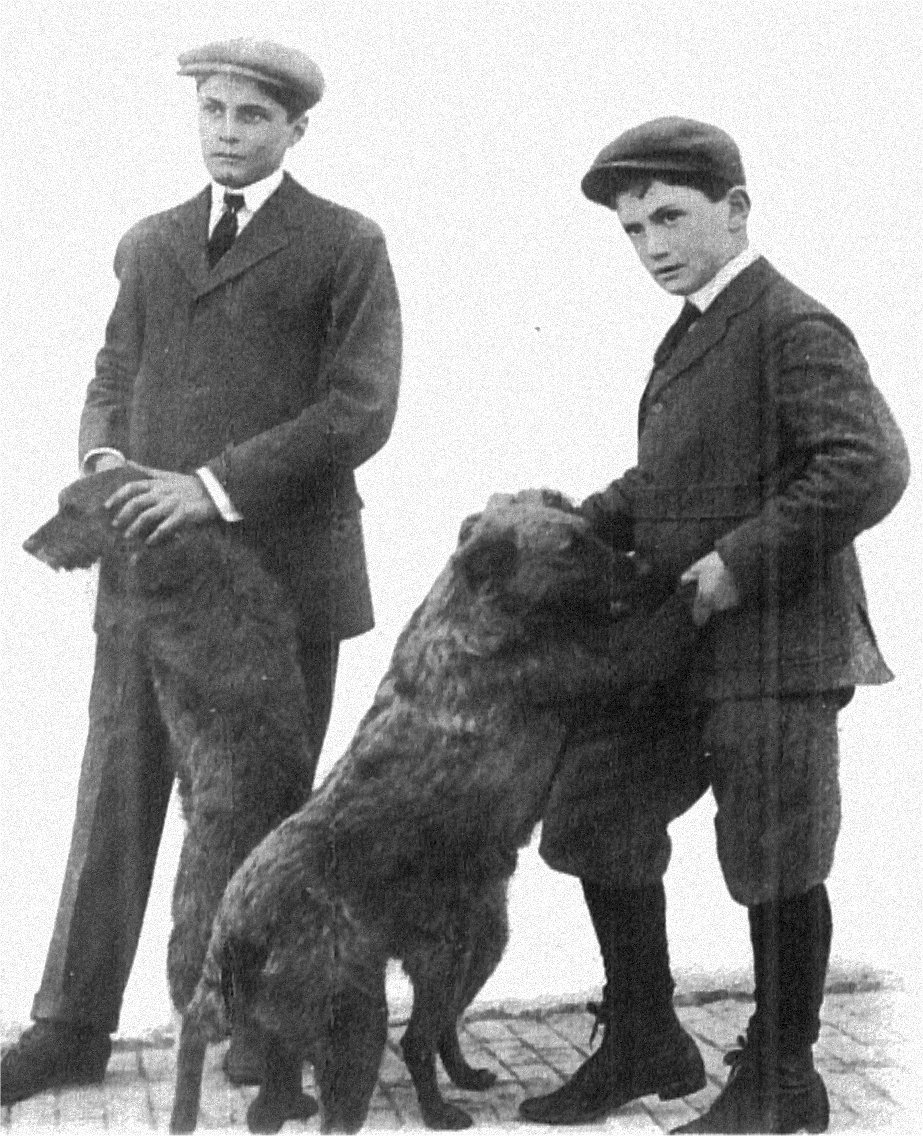
Edward (left) and Joseph Madden with family dogs, circa 1911.

Madden married Marie Anna Louise Megrue of Cincinnati in June 1890. They had two sons, J. Edward Madden, Jr. (1894–1943) and Joseph McKee Madden (1899–1932). The couple separated on ill-terms in 1903. Anna and her relatives sued Madden and were counter sued for years afterward, especially in relation to her and her brother's roles in a trusteeship for the boys.

In 1905, after learning that his estranged wife planned to take their sons to Europe and fearing she would not return them, Madden took the boys from the convent school they attended in Madison, New Jersey. He took them back with him by train to Lexington, Kentucky. Anna moved to Ohio and filed divorce proceedings in that state in 1906. Later that year Anna Madden married the wealthy New York City broker and turfman Louis Valentine Bell (1853–1925). The couple would soon move to Switzerland. Since the Maddens had been married in Kentucky and John Madden was not formally contacted in her divorce, the Kentucky court ruled that the divorce was not valid.

Madden finally secured full custody of their sons and filed for divorce from Anna Madden-Bell in February 1909. Anna Madden-Bell died on May 10, 1963, at the age of 91, having outlived both her husbands and both her sons.

== Quasi-retirement ==
John Madden wanted his sons to follow in his footsteps and continue breeding Thoroughbreds at Hamburg Place. He let them begin to purchase horses at the ages of 15 and 10, but neither developed a lasting interest in the family business. They became involved in developing oil fields in the American West, a new area of discovery and risk.

In 1926, Madden sold most of his breeding stock; he sold 139 horses for $446,200. By that time, he had become distant from the horse racing industry. By investing heavily in the corn refining business, he increased his net worth to more than $9 million. In October 1929, Madden, healthy for most of his life, developed pneumonia while staying at the Pennsylvania Hotel in New York City. He died of a heart attack on November 3, 1929, in his room at the hotel. His body was returned to Kentucky and was interred in Roman Catholic Calvary Cemetery in Lexington. He died soon after two other great horse trainers, Sam Hildreth and James Rowe Sr.

== Descendants and Hamburg Place ==
The Madden sons inherited Hamburg Place and $2 million from his estate. During the Great Depression, Joseph M. Madden committed suicide on October 31, 1932, in New York City, by shooting himself with a gun.

Nearly eleven years later, his brother Edward Madden also committed suicide, dying of a self-inflicted gunshot wound on February 26, 1943, at Hamburg Place. Edward was survived by his wife and two sons, Patrick (1933–1999) and Preston W. Madden (1934–2020). Edward Madden had raised mostly polo ponies at Hamburg Place.

It was not until his sons grew up and took an interest that they resumed Thoroughbred breeding in the 1950s at the farm. Preston Madden married Anita Myers. He notably stood the champion stallion T.V. Lark at the farm, and bred the 1987 Kentucky Derby winner Alysheba.
