= Dark Secret (horse) =

American-bred Thoroughbred racehorse

- Sire: Flying Ebony
- Grandsire: The Finn
- Dam: Silencia
- Damsire: King James
- Sex: Stallion
- Foaled: 1929
- Died: September 15, 1934 (aged 4–5)
- Country: United States
- Colour: Dark Bay/Brown
- Breeder: Wheatley Stable
- Owner: Wheatley Stable
- Trainer: James E. Fitzsimmons & George Tappen
- Record: 57: 23-12-6
- Earnings: US$89,375

Major wins
- Potomac Handicap (1932); Bowie Handicap (1932); Kenner Stakes (1932); Speculation Claiming Handicap (1932); Brooklyn Handicap (1933); Washington Handicap (1933); Laurel Stakes (1933); Merchants and Citizens Handicap (1933); Empire City Handicap (1933); Whitney Gold Cup Trophy Handicap (1933); Manhattan Handicap (1933, 1934); Jockey Club Gold Cup (1933, 1934); Saratoga Cup (1934)

Dark Secret (1929 – September 15, 1934) was an American Thoroughbred racehorse. He was bred and raced by Wheatley Stable, a partnership between Gladys Mills Phipps and her brother, Ogden Mills, the United States Secretary of the Treasury.

Dark Secret was the son of 1925 Kentucky Derby winner Flying Ebony. His dam was Silencia, a daughter of King James who was the American Champion Older Male Horse of 1909.

Among his important wins, in 1933 Dark Secret won the mile-and-half Manhattan and Bowie Handicaps plus the two mile Jockey Club Gold Cup. The following year he won these two races again but after crossing the finish line in the Gold Cup he broke a foreleg and was put down.
