= 1919 Kentucky Derby =

Horse race

45th Kentucky Derby
- Kentucky Derby
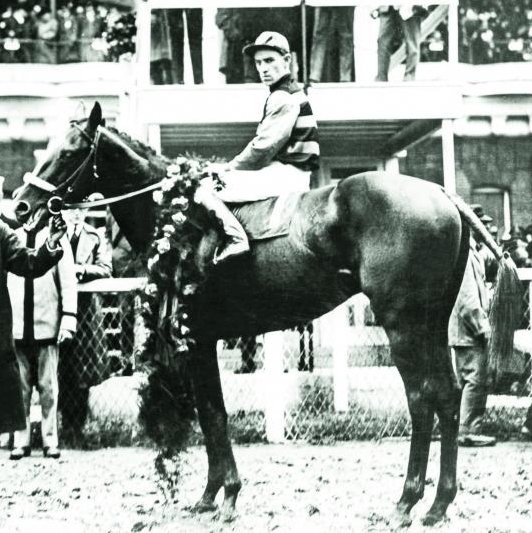
- Sir Barton, first winner of the Triple Crown in horse racing
- Location: Churchill Downs, Louisville, Kentucky
- Date: May 10, 1919
- Winning horse: Sir Barton
- Jockey: Johnny Loftus
- Trainer: H.G. Bedwell
- Owner: J.K.L. Ross
- Conditions: Heavy
- Surface: Dirt

The 1919 Kentucky Derby was the 45th running of the Kentucky Derby. The race took place on May 10, 1919. Winner Sir Barton went on to win in the Preakness and Belmont Stakes, becoming the first winner of the American Triple Crown.

== Pre-race coverage ==
A New York Times writer believed that the Preakness Stakes was competing for attention with the Derby, as it was held four days following the Derby and offered a purse of $30,000, larger than the Derby's $20,000. The author felt that the three-year old racing horses during the 1919 season were a "good crop" and that the course record of 2:03 2/5 set by Old Rosebud in 1914 could be broken. Sennings Park, a horse who stayed through the winter at Churchill Downs, ran a mile at the track in 1:43 3/5, the best time of the season in late April.

== Result ==
Final placings (1–12)
Finish	Post Position	Horse	Jockey	Trainer	Owner	Final Odds (Note: The odds are all to $1; for example, Sir Barton's odds of winning were $ on a $1.00 wager.)	Stake (Note: The total purse for the race was $24,600.)
1	1	Sir Barton	Johnny Loftus	H. Guy Bedwell	J. K. L. Ross		$20,825
2	13	Billy Kelly	Earl Sande	H. Guy Bedwell	J. K. L. Ross		$2,500
3	8	Under Fire	Mack Garner	Patrick Dunne	Patrick Dunne		$1,000
4	7	Vulcanite	Cecil Howard	John Hogan	William F. Polson		$275
5	9	Sennings Park	Harry Lunsford	Oswald A. Bianchi	Oswald A. Bianchi		–
6	2	Be Frank	James Butwell	Walter B. Jennings	Cornelius M. Garrison		–
7	11	Sailor	J. McIntyre	Kimball Patterson	James W. McClelland		–
8	5	St. Bernard	Earl Pool	B. J. Brannon	B. J. Brannon		–
9	10	Regalo	Frank Murphy	John C. Gallaher	Gallaher Bros.		–
10	6	Eternal	Andy Schuttinger	Kimball Patterson	James W. McClelland		–
11	14	Frogtown	John Morys	Henry E. McDaniel	Willis Sharpe Kilmer		–
12	3	Vindex	Willie Knapp	James G. Rowe Sr.	Harry Payne Whitney		–

- Winning Breeder: John E. Madden & Vivian A. Gooch; (KY)
- Horses Corson and Clermont scratched before the race.

Kentucky Derby Payout Schedule
Post Position	Horse	Win	Place	Show
1	Sir Barton	$7.20	$6.70	$6.00
13	Billy Kelly	–	$6.70	$6.00
8	Under Fire	–	–	$10.80

== Aftermath ==
For the first time in race history two horses from the same owner finished in first and second place. In addition, Ross became the first Canadian owner to have a horse win the Kentucky Derby.
