= 1902 Kentucky Derby =

Horse race

28th Kentucky Derby
- Kentucky Derby
- Grade I stakes race
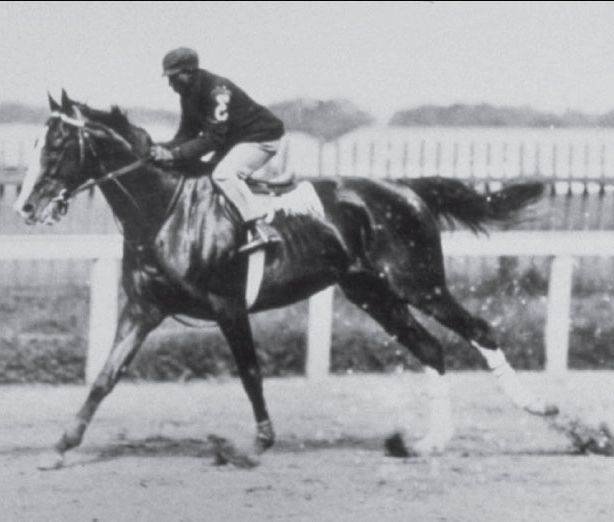
- Jimmy Winkfield aboard Alan-a-Dale in 1902
- Location: Churchill Downs
- Date: May 3, 1902
- Winning horse: Alan-a-Dale
- Jockey: Jimmy Winkfield
- Trainer: Thomas Clay McDowell
- Owner: Thomas Clay McDowell
- Surface: Dirt

The 1902 Kentucky Derby was the 28th running of the Kentucky Derby. The race took place on May 3, 1902. This marked the first year in which the race was held on its now-traditional day of Saturday; all prior races had taken place anywhere from Monday through Friday. Alan-a-Dale won by a nose after going lame while he was well in front of the other horses; jockey Jimmy Winkfield held him together as the colt barely won. Inventor finished second. The Rival was third, 1/2 length behind Inventor. Winkfield's win in the 1902 Kentucky Derby was the last time that an African American jockey rode a winning horse in the Kentucky Derby.

== Full results ==
Finished	Post	Horse	Jockey	Trainer	Owner	Time / behind
1st		Alan-a-Dale	Jimmy Winkfield	Thomas Clay McDowell	Thomas Clay McDowell	2:08.75
2nd		Inventor	Robert "Tiny" Williams		T. W. Moore	Nose
3rd		The Rival	Nash Turner	Thomas Clay McDowell	Thomas Clay McDowell	1/2
4th		Abe Frank	Monk Coburn	Henry McDaniel	George C. Bennett & Co.	Nose

== Payout ==
- The winner received a purse of $4,850.
- Second place received $700.
- Third place received $300.
