= 1950 Kentucky Derby =

Horse race

76th Kentucky Derby
- Kentucky Derby
- Grade I stakes race
- Location: Churchill Downs
- Date: May 6, 1950
- Winning horse: Middleground
- Jockey: William Boland
- Trainer: Max Hirsch
- Owner: King Ranch
- Surface: Dirt

The 1950 Kentucky Derby was the 76th running of the Kentucky Derby. The race took place on May 6, 1950.

== Full results ==
Finished	Post	Horse	Jockey	Trainer	Owner	Time / behind
1st	1A	Middleground	William Boland	Max Hirsch	King Ranch	2:01.60
2nd	6	Hill Prince	Eddie Arcaro	Casey Hayes	Christopher Chenery	
3rd	2	Mr. Trouble	Douglas Dodson	Sylvester Veitch	Cornelius Vanderbilt Whitney	
4th	3	Sunglow	John Robertson	Preston M. Burch	Brookmeade Stable	
5th	7	Oil Capitol	Kenneth Church	Harry Trotsek	Tom Gray	
6th	12	Hawley	Gordon Glisson	Jake Lowenstein	Clifford Mooers	
7th	9	Lotowhite	Ovie Scurlock	Frank Barnett	Hal Price Headley	
8th	1	On the Mark	Eric Guerin	Max Hirsch	King Ranch	
9th	4	Your Host	Johnny Longden	Harry L. Daniels	William Goetz	
10th	8	Hallieboy	George Atkins	Walter T. Fugate	Walter T. Fugate	
11th	2C	Dooly	Steve Brooks	Sylvester Veitch	Cornelius Vanderbilt Whitney	
12th	5	Trumpet King	Hedley Woodhouse	Earl Steffen	Willorene Farm	
13th	10	Stranded	Robert L. Baird	LeRoy J. Keating	Abercrombie & Smith	
14th	11	Black George	Eric Nelson	Raymond Barnett	William H. Veeneman	
