= 1900 Kentucky Derby =

Horse race

26th Kentucky Derby
- Kentucky Derby
- Grade I stakes race
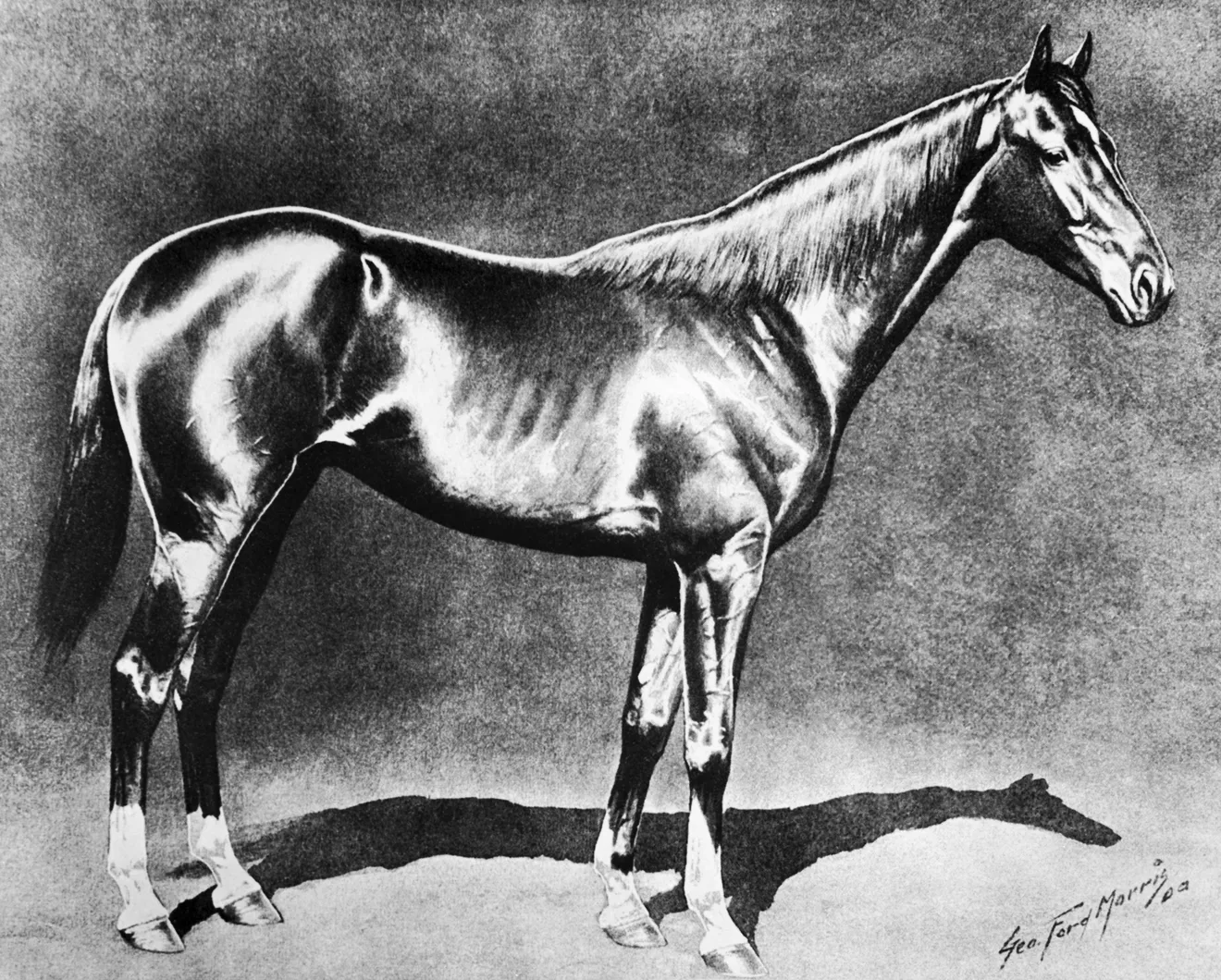
- Lieutenant Gibson, winner of the 1900 Kentucky Derby
- Location: Churchill Downs
- Date: May 3, 1900
- Winning horse: Lieut. Gibson
- Jockey: Jimmy Boland
- Trainer: Charles H. Hughes
- Owner: Charles H. Smith
- Surface: Dirt

The 1900 Kentucky Derby was the 26th running of the Kentucky Derby. The race took place on May 3, 1900. The winning time of 2:06.25 set a new Derby record.

== Full results ==
Finished	Post	Horse	Jockey	Trainer	Owner	Time / behind
1st		Lieut. Gibson	Jimmy Boland	Charles H. Hughes	Charles H. Smith	2:06.50
2nd		Florizar	Clyde Van Dusen	Hiram J. Scoggan	Hiram J. Scoggan	3
3rd		Thrive	James Winkfield	Julius C. Cahn	Julius C. Cahn	2
4th		Highland Lad	Richard Crowhurst	Hiram J. Scoggan	Hiram J. Scoggan	1
5th		His Excellency	Gilmore	Thomas Clay McDowell	Thomas Clay McDowell	3
6th		Kentucky Farmer	Monk Overton		Woodford & Buckner	nose
7th		Hindus	Harry Vititoe	John H. Morris	George J. Long	8

== Payout ==
- The winner received a purse of $4,850.
- Second place received $700.
- Third place received $300.
