= Frank D. Weir =

American racehorse trainer

Frank Weir
Personal information
- Born: December 16, 1863 Kane County, Illinois
- Died: August 11, 1923 (aged 59) Chicago, Illinois
- Resting place: Cedar Grove Cemetery, Gloucester City, New Jersey

Horse racing career
- Sport: Horse racing

Major racing wins
- Jerome Handicap (1901); Bay Ridge Handicap (1903); Bayshore Stakes (1903); Pansy Stakes (1903); Sheepshead Bay Handicap (1903); Manhattan Handicap (1905, 1906); Bayview Handicap (1906); Carter Handicap (1906, 1917); Fall Handicap (1906); Flight Stakes (1906, 1907); Patchogue Stakes (1906); Sterling Stakes (1906); Toboggan Handicap (1906); Albany Handicap (1907); Hopeful Stakes (1907); Brighton Junior Stakes (1910); Churchill Downs Handicap (1912); Golden Rod Stakes (1913); Flash Stakes (1913); Harold Stakes (1913); United States Hotel Stakes (1913); St. Leger Handicap (1914); Babylon Handicap (1917); Carter Handicap (1917); Clark Handicap (1917); Delaware Handicap (1917); Nursery Handicap (1917); Queens County Handicap (1917); Red Cross Handicap (1917, 1918); Wilmington Stakes (1918); Woodberry Handicap (1918); Empire City Derby (1918); Southampton Handicap (1918) American Classics wins: Kentucky Derby (1914); Preakness Stakes (1918)

Significant horses
- Edith W., Jack Hare Jr., Jim Gaffney, King Pepper, Old Rosebud, Roseben

Frank D. Weir (December 16, 1863 - August 11, 1923) was an American trainer of Thoroughbred racehorses best known as the trainer of U.S. Racing Hall of Fame inductee Roseben and the trainer of another Hall of Fame inductee Old Rosebud with whom he won the 1914 Kentucky Derby as well as the winning trainer of the 1918 Preakness Stakes with Jack Hare Jr.

Weir began his career as a trainer in 1884 and in 1893 won 150 races. Success led to a move in 1903 to New York to compete at the big tracks at Sheepshead Bay, Gravesend, Brighton Beach, Aqueduct, Jamaica and Saratoga. There, between 1903 and 1907 he won 217 races and earned $294,957 (adjusted for inflation: $8,212,083 in 2019).
