= Billy Kelly (horse) =

American thoroughbred racehorse

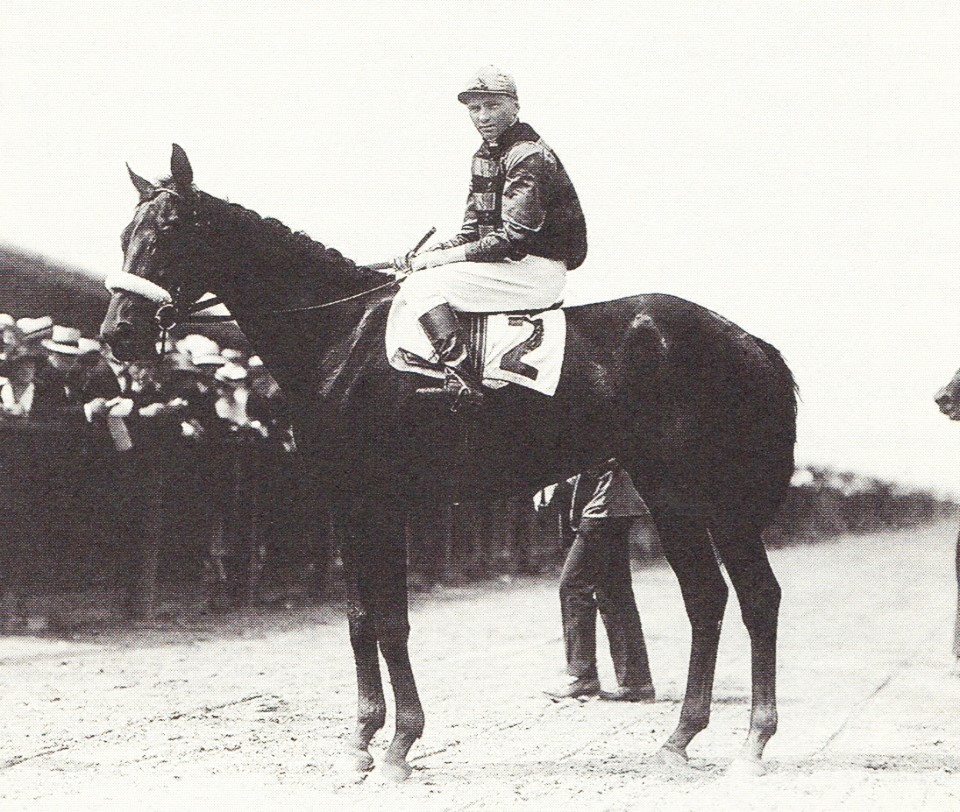
- Billy Kelly, circa 1919
- Sire: Dick Welles
- Grandsire: King Eric
- Dam: Glena
- Damsire: Free Knight
- Sex: Gelding
- Foaled: 1916
- Died: 1926
- Country: United States
- Colour: Bay
- Breeder: Jerome B. Respess
- Owner: J. K. L. Ross
- Trainer: William Perkins; H. Guy Bedwell
- Record: 69 Starts: 39-14-7
- Earnings: $99,782

Major wins
- Idle Hour Stakes (1918); Bashford Manor Stakes (1918); Flash Stakes (1918); United States Hotel Stakes (1918); Sanford Stakes (1918); Annapolis Handicap (1918); Grab Bag Handicap (1918); Eastern Shore Handicap (1918); Columbia Handicap (1918); Harford Handicap (1919, 1920, 1921); Philadelphia Handicap (1919); Toboggan Handicap (1919); Capitol Handicap (1919, 1921); Susquehanna Handicap (1919); Pimlico Fall Serial (1919, 1920); Connaught Handicap (1921); King George Stakes (1921); Aero Handicap (1921); Govan Handicap (1921) Triple Crown Race placing: Kentucky Derby (1919)

Awards
- American Champion Two-Year-Old Male Horse (1918)

Honors
- United States Racing Hall of Fame (2015)

Billy Kelly (foaled 1916 in Kentucky, died 1926 in Canada) was an American Thoroughbred racehorse who was the champion two-year-old in 1918 when he won 14 of 17 starts. Favored for the 1919 Kentucky Derby, he lost to his stablemate, the then lightly regarded Sir Barton, but Billy Kelly would beat Sir Barton in 8 of 12 head to head races. Billy Kelly would go on to win 39 races from 69 starts. He was elected to the National Museum of Racing and Hall of Fame in 2015.

== Background ==
Billy Kelly was foaled in 1916 at Woodlawn Farm in Erlanger, Kentucky, bred by Jerome Respess. He was sold as a yearling for $1,500 to trainer William Perkins, who then sold a half interest to W. F. Polson. After two stakes wins at the 1918 Saratoga meeting, Commander J. K. L. Ross bought Billy Kelly for $27,500. Following the sale, he was trained by H. Guy Bedwell.

Named after a sports editor for a newspaper in Buffalo, Billy Kelly was a small, lightly made gelding and "as plain as a horse could be." A contemporary said he "looked like a lean mule."

== Racing career ==
During his two-year-old campaign in 1918, Billy Kelly won 14 of 17 starts and earnings of $33,783, equivalent to $723,121 in 2025. He won four stakes races at Saratoga in the span of three weeks. He even raced against his elders in two all-aged races and won four times carrying 130 or more pounds. A narrow loss to Eternal in a match race at Laurel led to the two sharing the honor of the season's juvenile champion. Billy Kelly's wins that year included:

William Perkins - trainer

- Idle Hour Stakes (4 1/2 furlongs at Lexington)
- Bashford Manor Stakes (4 1/2 furlongs at Churchill Downs)
- Flash Stakes (5 1/2 furlongs at Saratoga), setting a new track record
- United States Hotel Stakes (6 furlongs at Saratoga)

H. Guy Bedwell - trainer

- Sanford Stakes (6 furlongs at Saratoga)
- Grab Bag Handicap (6 furlongs at Saratoga)
- Eastern Shore Handicap (6 furlongs at Havre de Grace), under 135 pounds
- Annapolis Handicap (6 furlongs at Laurel)
- Columbia Handicap (6 furlongs at Laurel)

At age three and beyond, Billy Kelly was overshadowed by stablemate Sir Barton, even though Billy Kelly finished ahead of Sir Barton eight of the twelve times they met. He was widely considered to be one of the best sprinters of his time, but also won at distances up to 1 1/4 miles. He was a durable and dependable runner who excelled under high weight assignments.

He was the entered in the 1919 Kentucky Derby, where he was the second choice in the betting behind his two-year-old rival, Eternal. Sir Barton (then still a maiden and thus carrying less weight than the other horses) was also entered as his pacemaker. Over a muddy track, Sir Barton set a quick pace, intended to wear out other horses near the pace including Eternal, allowing Billy Kelly to pass tiring horses and win the race. But Sir Barton never faltered and won by five lengths with Billy Kelly finishing second. It was the first time that stablemates had run 1–2 in the Derby and also the first time a Canadian had owned the Derby winner. Billy Kelly's second-place finish also made Ross the winner of a $50,000 "horse-and-horse" bet with gambler Arnold Rothstein regarding Billy Kelly and Eternal, who ran 10th in the race.

His wins at ages three and up included:

- Harford Handicap (1919, 1920, 1921) - 5 1/2 furlongs at Havre de Grace
- Philadelphia Handicap (1919) - 6 furlongs at Havre de Grace
- Toboggan Handicap (1919) - 6 furlongs at Belmont
- Capital Handicap (1919, 1921) - 6 furlongs at Laurel
- Pimlico Fall Serial Weight-For-Age #1 (1919, 1920) - 6 furlongs at Pimlico
- Highweight Handicap (1919) - at Havre de Grace
- Susquehanna Handicap (1919) - 6 furlongs at Havre de Grace, setting a new track record
- Pimlico Fall Serial Weight-For-Age #3 (1920) - 9 furlongs at Pimlico
- Belair Handicap (1920) - 6 furlongs at Havre de Grace
- Connaught Handicap (1921) - at Blue Bonnets in Montreal, Canada
- King George Stakes (1921)
- Aero Handicap (1921)
- Govan Handicap (1921)

Out of the money just six times, Billy Kelly might have had an even better record if he had not been the victim of race fixing. After he won his first six starts as a five-year-old, someone pushed a sponge deep into one of his nostrils, which interfered with his ability to breathe. Billy Kelly finished unplaced and in obvious distress in three straight races before the sponge was discovered and removed. This may have done permanent damage to Billy Kelly's lungs and heart, for although he won three straight races after the sponge was removed, he bled heavily in his next outing. He only displayed his old form once afterward, when finishing second to Exterminator in the 1922 Harford Handicap.

== Retirement and honors ==
After a brief stint as a hunter and an unsuccessful comeback to racing, Billy Kelly was pensioned in 1923. He was found dead in his stall at Ross's farm in Canada in the summer of 1926: the autopsy revealed an enlarged heart. He was buried in a field overlooking the St. Lawrence River.

In 2015, Billy Kelly was elected to the National Museum of Racing and Hall of Fame. Horses, jockeys and trainers from the past are nominated by those in the racing industry, historians and members of the public. The Historic Review Committee then selects a maximum of three finalists to be considered for election. The finalists are required to receive 75% approval from the Historic Review Committee to gain election to the Hall of Fame.

== Pedigree ==
Pedigree of Billy Kelly, gelding, 1916
| Sire Dick Welles 1900 | King Eric; 1887 | King Ernest (GB) | King Tom (GB)* |
| Sire Dick Welles 1900 | King Eric; 1887 | King Ernest (GB) | Ernestone (GB) |
| Sire Dick Welles 1900 | King Eric; 1887 | Cyclone (GB) | Parmesan (GB) |
| Sire Dick Welles 1900 | King Eric; 1887 | Cyclone (GB) | Typhoon (GB) |
| Sire Dick Welles 1900 | Tea's Over; 1893 | Hanover | Hindoo |
| Sire Dick Welles 1900 | Tea's Over; 1893 | Hanover | Bourbon Belle |
| Sire Dick Welles 1900 | Tea's Over; 1893 | Tea Rose | King Alfonso* |
| Sire Dick Welles 1900 | Tea's Over; 1893 | Tea Rose | Tuberose |
| Dam Glena 1898 | Free Knight; 1883 | Ten Broeck | Phaeton (GB)* |
| Dam Glena 1898 | Free Knight; 1883 | Ten Broeck | Fanny Holton |
| Dam Glena 1898 | Free Knight; 1883 | Belle Knight | Knighthood |
| Dam Glena 1898 | Free Knight; 1883 | Belle Knight | Kentucky Belle |
| Dam Glena 1898 | Fautress; 1886 | Faustus | Enquirer |
| Dam Glena 1898 | Fautress; 1886 | Faustus | Lizzie G* |
| Dam Glena 1898 | Fautress; 1886 | Can Dance | War Dance* |
| Dam Glena 1898 | Fautress; 1886 | Can Dance | Bank Stock family: 9-d |

* Billy Kelly is inbred 4S x 6S x 5D to the stallion King Tom, meaning that he appears fourth generation and sixth generation (via King Alfonso) on the sire side of his pedigree, and fifth generation (via Phaeton) on the dam side of his pedigree.

* Billy Kelly is inbred 5S x 4D to the stallion Phaeton, meaning that he appears fifth generation (via King Alfonso) on the sire side of his pedigree, and fourth generation on the dam side of his pedigree.

* Billy Kelly is inbred 5D x 4D to the stallion War Dance, meaning that he appears fifth generation (via Lizzy B) and fourth generation on the dam side of his pedigree.
