= 1944 Kentucky Derby =

Horse race

70th Kentucky Derby
- Kentucky Derby
- Grade I stakes race
- Location: Churchill Downs
- Date: May 6, 1944
- Winning horse: Pensive
- Jockey: Conn McCreary
- Trainer: Ben A. Jones
- Owner: Calumet Farm
- Surface: Dirt

The 1944 Kentucky Derby was the 70th running of the Kentucky Derby. The race took place on May 6, 1944.

== Full results ==
Finished	Post	Horse	Jockey	Trainer	Owner	Time / behind
1st	5	Pensive	Conn McCreary	Ben A. Jones	Calumet Farm	2:04 1/5
2nd	3	Broadcloth	George Woolf	Charles T. Leavitt	Agnes Poulsen	
3rd	6	Stir Up	Eddie Arcaro	John M. Gaver, Sr.	Greentree Stable	
4th	12	Shut Up	Ralph Eccard	Ray Priddy	Erlanger Stable (Joe Goldband)	
5th	15	Brief Sigh	Vicenzo Nodarse	Rollie T. Shepp	River Divide Farm (Robert J. Dienst)	
6th	9	Gay Bit	Jack Westrope	Albert Dunne	Bobanet Stable (R. Bruce Livie)	
7th	16	Bell Buzzer	Billie Thompson	Charles P. Sanborn	David Ferguson	
8th	4	Gramps Image	Otto Grohs	Whitey Abel	Dorothy Abel	
9th	2	Skytracer	Michael Caffarella	Frank J. Baker	Manuel B. Goff	
10th	1	Challenge Me	Willie Garner	Danny Cataldo	Brolite Farm (Oscar E. Breault)	
11th	8	Alorter	Johnny Adams	John H. Skirvin	Alwin C. Ernst	
12th	19	Comenow	J. Raymond Layton	Lucius P. Harlan	Philip Godfrey	
13th	13	Valley Flares	George Burns	Bertram R. Paton	Bertram R. Paton	
14th	14	Diavolaw	Joseph Molbert	Phil Reilly	W. Campbell Hobson	
15th	10	Rockwood Boy	William Bailey	George S. Morris	W. C. Davis	
16th	17	American Eagle	Jesse Higley	Raymond White	James V. Maggio	

- Winning breeder: Calumet Farm (KY)
