= 1964 Kentucky Derby =

Horse race

90th Kentucky Derby
- Kentucky Derby
- Grade I stakes race
- Location: Churchill Downs
- Date: May 2, 1964
- Winning horse: Northern Dancer
- Jockey: Bill Hartack
- Trainer: Horatio Luro
- Owner: Windfields Farm
- Surface: Dirt

The 1964 Kentucky Derby was the 90th running of the Kentucky Derby. The race took place on May 2, 1964. Northern Dancer's winning time set a new Derby record (later broken).

== Full results ==
Finished	Post	Horse	Jockey	Trainer	Owner	Time / behind
1st	7	Northern Dancer	Bill Hartack	Horatio Luro	Windfields Farm	2:00
2nd	11	Hill Rise	Bill Shoemaker	William B. Finnegan	El Peco Ranch (George A. Pope)	neck
3rd	6	The Scoundrel	Manuel Ycaza	Meshach A. Tenney	Rex C. Ellsworth	3 1/4
4th	12	Roman Brother	Wayne Chambers	Burley E. Parke	Harbor View Farm	nose
5th	2	Quadrangle	Bobby Ussery	J. Elliott Burch	Rokeby Stables	3
6th	1	Mr. Brick	Ismael Valenzuela	James E. Picou	Roy Sturgis	3/4
7th	5	Mr. Moonlight	Jimmy Combest	Nick Combest	Edith Baily Dent	5
8th	9	Dandy K.	Mickey Solomone	Robert E. Wingfield	Cecil Carmine	2 1/4
9th	8	Ishkoodah	Ronald Baldwin	Harold G. Bockman	Tumblewood Stable (Mrs. D. W. Price/Tom Woods)	4
10th	3	Wil Rad	Jacinto Vásquez	Robert E. Wingfield	Wilbur Clark & William Radkovich	nose
11th	4	Extra Swell	Merlin Volzke	Earle Davis	Mr. & Mrs. Earle Davis	14
12th	10	Royal Shuck	Harrel Bolin	Ben H. Marshall	Emil A. Dust	

- Winning Breeder: Windfields Farm (E. P. Taylor); (ON)
