= 1881 Kentucky Derby =

Horse race

7th Kentucky Derby
- Kentucky Derby
- Grade I stakes race
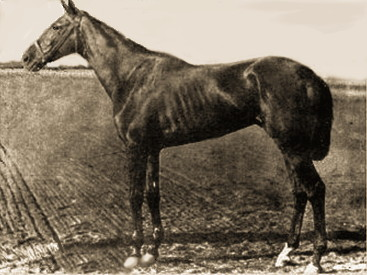
- 1881 Kentucky Derby winner Hindoo
- Location: Churchill Downs
- Date: May 17, 1881
- Winning horse: Hindoo
- Jockey: Jim McLaughlin
- Trainer: James G. Rowe Sr.
- Owner: Dwyer Brothers Stable
- Surface: Dirt

The 1881 Kentucky Derby was the 7th running of the Kentucky Derby. The race took place on May 17, 1881.

== Full results ==
Finished	Post	Horse	Jockey	Trainer	Owner	Time / behind
1st		Hindoo	Jim McLaughlin	James G. Rowe Sr.	Dwyer Bros.	2:40.00
2nd		Lelex	Alonzo Allen		Barak G. Thomas	
3rd		Alfambra	G. Evans		G. W. Bowen & Co.	
4th		Sligo	William Donohue		H. Price McGrath	
5th		Getaway	T. Fisher		Milton Young	
6th		Calycanthus	G. Smith		H. Price McGrath	

== Payout ==
Post	Horse	Win	Place	Show
	Hindoo	$ 6.60		
	Lelex		$12.70	

- The winner received a purse of $4,410.
- Second place received $200.
