= Charles Hatton (journalist) =

American sports journalist

Charles Hatton (born circa 1907 - died 1975 in Port Washington, Long Island, New York State) was an American sports journalist. He wrote for the Daily Racing Form for 40 years, and has been credited as creating the term "Triple Crown" for winners of the Kentucky Derby, Preakness Stakes and Belmont Stakes. Hatton wrote for the American Racing Manual from 1947 to 1974.
