= 1935 Kentucky Derby =

Horse race

61st Kentucky Derby
- Kentucky Derby
- Location: Churchill Downs
- Date: May 4, 1935
- Winning horse: Omaha
- Jockey: Willie Saunders
- Trainer: James E. Fitzsimmons
- Owner: Belair Stud
- Surface: Dirt

The 1935 Kentucky Derby was the 61st running of the Kentucky Derby. The race took place on May 4, 1935. The race was won by Omaha, ridden by Willie Saunders and trained by James E. Fitzsimmons.

18 horses participated in the race. The victorious Omaha won the Triple Crown, as he went on to win the Preakness Stakes and the Belmont Stakes.

== Full results ==
Finished	Post	Horse	Jockey	Trainer	Owner	Time / behind
1st	11	Omaha	Willie Saunders	James E. Fitzsimmons	Belair Stud	2:05.00
2nd	3	Roman Soldier	Lester Balaski	Phil Reuter	William Sachsenmaier & Phil Reuter	
3rd	9	Whiskolo	Wayne D. Wright	Robert V. McGarvey	Milky Way Farm Stable	
4th	10	Nellie Flag	Eddie Arcaro	Burton B. Williams	Calumet Farm	
5th	14	Blackbirder	Willie Garner	Charles Hainesworth	Charles Hainesworth	
6th	8	Psychic Bid	Robert Jones	Robert Augustus Smith	Brookmeade Stable	
7th	12	Morpluck	Mack Garner	Clarence Buxton	Jerome H. Louchheim	
8th	16	Plat Eye	Silvio Coucci	John M. Gaver Sr.	Greentree Stable	
9th	5	McCarthy	Robert Finnerty	John Chesney	Morrison & Keating	
10th	19	Commonwealth	George Woolf	Preston M. Burch	Sarah F. Jeffords	
11th	6	Sun Fairplay	Sam Renick	W. E. Collins	Fair Fields Farm Stable	
12th	17	Today	Raymond Workman	T. J. Healey	Cornelius Vanderbilt Whitney	
13th	2	Whopper	Charles Landolt	Duval A. Headley	Hal Price Headley	
14th	7	Bluebeard	Herman Schutte	Arthur Goldblatt	Mrs. R. B. Fairbanks	
15th	20	Tutticurio	Charles Corbett	Frank M. Bray	Brandon Stable	
16th	13	Boxthorn	Don Meade	Herbert J. Thompson	Edward R. Bradley	
17th	1	St. Bernard	Paul Keester	Albert B. Gordon	E. Dale Shaffer	
18th	15	Weston	Sterling Young	Tom B. Young	Braedalbane Stable	
