= 1969 Kentucky Derby =

Horse race

95th Kentucky Derby
- Kentucky Derby
- Grade I stakes race
- Location: Churchill Downs
- Date: May 3, 1969
- Winning horse: Majestic Prince
- Jockey: Bill Hartack
- Trainer: Johnny Longden
- Owner: Frank M. McMahon
- Surface: Dirt

The 1969 Kentucky Derby was the 95th running of the Kentucky Derby. The race took place on May 3, 1969, at Churchill Downs in Louisville, Kentucky. The dirt tracked was in excellent condition for the race.

== Full results ==
Finished	Post	Horse	Jockey	Trainer	Owner	Time / behind
1st	8	Majestic Prince	Bill Hartack	Johnny Longden	Frank M. McMahon	2:01 4/5
2nd	3	Arts and Letters	Braulio Baeza	J. Elliott Burch	Rokeby Stables	head
3rd	7	Dike	Jorge Velásquez	Lucien Laurin	Claiborne Farm	
4th	2	Traffic Mark	Phil Grimm	Ronnie G. Warren	Mr.& Mrs. Robert F. Roberts	
5th	1	Top Knight	Manuel Ycaza	Ray Metcalf	Steven B. Wilson Estate	
6th	6	Ocean Roar	Robert Stewart	Gordon Mclean	Leo Miller	
7th	5	Fleet Allied	Dean Hall	Harold Carl McBride	Mr. & Mrs. V. Kanowsky	
8th	4	Rae Jet	Robert Howard	John Thomas Cosdon Jr.	Robert E. Harris	

- Winning Breeder: Leslie Combs II; (KY)
