= 1926 Kentucky Derby =

Horse race

52nd Kentucky Derby
- Kentucky Derby
- Location: Churchill Downs
- Date: May 15, 1926
- Winning horse: Bubbling Over
- Jockey: Albert Johnson
- Trainer: Herbert J. Thompson
- Owner: Idle Hour Stock Farm
- Conditions: Fast
- Surface: Dirt

The 1926 Kentucky Derby was the 52nd running of the Kentucky Derby. The race was run on May 15, 1926.

== Payout ==
The Kentucky Derby Payout Schedule

Program Number	Horse Name	Win	Place	Show
14	Bubbling Over	$5.80	$5.80	$4.60
4	Bagenbaggage	–	$5.80	$4.60
3	Rock Man	–	–	$30.00

== Field ==
Position	Post	Horse	Jockey	Trainer	Owner	Final Odds	Stake
1	14	Bubbling Over	Albert Johnson	Herbert J. Thompson	Idle Hour Stock Farm Stable	1.90	$50,075
2	4	Bagenbaggage	Eric Blind	William A. Hurley	Idle Hour Stock Farm Stable	1.90	$6,000
3	3	Rock Man	Frank Coltiletti	Joseph H. Stotler	Sagamore Stable	42.10	$3,000
4	12	Rhinock	Mack Garner	William D. Covington	Parkview Stable (Mrs. George B. Cox)	14.60	$1,000
5	9	Pompey	Laverne Fator	William H. Karrick	William R. Coe	2.10	
6	6	Espino	William Smith	William J. Speirs	William Ziegler Jr.	39.70	
7	1	Light Carbine	Strother Griffin	Michael Joseph Dunleavy	Ira B. Humphreys	61.00	
8	8	Canter	Clarence Turner	Harry Rites	J. Edwin Griffith	24.10	
9	4	Blondin	Linus McAtee	Fred Hopkins	Harry Payne Whitney	9.30	
10	10	Display	John Maiben	T. J. Healey	Walter J. Salmon Sr.	16.20	
11	7	Recollection	John Callahan	George Vanburen Barnes	Walter I. Kohn & L. G. Theisen	11.40	
12	5	Champ de Mars	Earl Pool	Allan D. Steele	Keeneland Stud Farm	11.40	
13	13	Roycrofter	Edward Scobie	L. A. Connor	G. Frank Croissant	11.40	

- Winning Breeder: Idle Hour Stock Farm; (KY)
- Margins – 5 lengths
- Time – 2:03 4/5
- Track – Fast
- Horses Boot To Boot, Take A Change, Bolton, and Rasuli were scratched before the race.
