= H. Guy Bedwell =

American racehorse trainer (1876–1951)

Personal information
- Born: June 22, 1876 Roseburg, Oregon, U.S.
- Died: December 31, 1951 (aged 75)
- Occupation: Trainer

Horse racing career
- Sport: Horse racing
- Career wins: 2,100+

Major racing wins
- Victoria Stakes (1914, 1916); Bashford Manor Stakes (1918, 1927); Brooklyn Handicap (1918); Dixie Stakes (1918); Flash Stakes (1918); Sanford Stakes (1918); United States Hotel Stakes (1918); Walden Stakes (1918, 1923); Black-Eyed Susan Stakes (1919); Capitol Handicap (1919, 1921, 1939, 1940); Gazelle Handicap (1919); Harford Handicap (1919, 1920, 1921, 1939, 1940); Havre de Grace Cup Handicap (1919); Philadelphia Handicap (1919); Potomac Handicap (1919); Spinaway Stakes (1919); Toboggan Handicap (1919); Withers Stakes (1919); Delaware Handicap (1920); Fall Highweight Handicap (1920); Ladies Handicap (1920); Saratoga Handicap (1920); Bowie Stakes (1921); Breeders' Stakes (1923, 1926); San Pasqual Handicap (1938); San Vicente Stakes (1938); Santa Maria Handicap (1938) U.S. Triple Crown series: Kentucky Derby (1919); Preakness Stakes (1919); Belmont Stakes (1919); United States Triple Crown (1919)

Racing awards
- U.S. Champion Thoroughbred Trainer by wins (1909, 1912, 1913, 1914, 1915, 1916, 1917); U.S. Champion Thoroughbred Trainer by earnings (1918, 1919)

Honours
- National Museum of Racing and Hall of Fame (1971)

Significant horses
- Billy Kelly, Cudgel, Milkmaid, Sir Barton, Sun Egret

Harvey Guy Bedwell (June 22, 1876 – December 31, 1951) was an American Hall of Fame trainer and owner of Thoroughbredracehorses who was the first trainer to win the U.S. Triple Crown.

Born in Roseburg, Oregon, he was known by his middle name. As a young man, Guy Bedwell began working as a cowboy and by the early 1900s owned and raced horses in Colorado before moving east. He raced Thoroughbreds from a base at tracks in Maryland and at Empire City Race Track in New York as well as at Old Woodbine Race Course in Ontario, where he became acquainted with the wealthy stable owner, J. K. L. Ross.

In 1909, Bedwell won more races than any trainer in the United States but after New York State legislation banned parimutuel betting and ended racing in that state, Bedwell moved to Kentucky where he conditioned horses at Covington's Latonia Race Track. When racing resumed in New York, Bedwell returned to compete there and repeated as the United States Champion Thoroughbred Trainer by wins from 1912 through 1917. In 1918, he took over as head trainer of the J. K. L. Ross stables in Verchères, Quebec. Among his best horses that year was Cudgel who earned American Champion Older Male Horse honors. Bedwell finished 1918 as the United States Champion Thoroughbred Trainer by earnings.

== First Triple Crown Champion ==
In 1918, Guy Bedwell had two highly regarded two-year-olds in his care. Billy Kelly shared American Champion Two-Year-Old Colt honors with James W. McClelland's colt, Eternal. The second outstanding runner under Bedwell's care was Milkmaid who is regarded as the best 3-year-old filly in American racing in 1919 and who would be voted American Champion Older Female Horse honors in 1920.

Going into the 1919 season, owner J. K. L. Ross acquired another three-year-old named Sir Barton from John E. Madden. Winless in six starts at two, Sir Barton had good early speed and as such was entered in the Kentucky Derby to serve as a pace-setting rabbit for stablemate, Billy Kelly and his jockey, Earl Sande. The combined betting entry of Billy Kelly and Sir Barton were made the second choice among bettors in the Derby behind favorite, Eternal. As planned, jockey Johnny Loftus immediately took the lead and set the pace with Sir Barton but shocked everyone when he never relinquished it and won easily by five lengths over Billy Kelly.

Just four days later, Guy Bedwell entered Sir Barton in the Preakness Stakes at the Pimlico Race Course in Baltimore, Maryland. The colt won the race then went on to capture the Withers Stakes in New York and shortly thereafter completed the first Triple Crown in U.S. history by easily winning the Belmont Stakes while setting a track and American record for the then mile and three-eighths race. In addition to Sir Barton, in 1919 Bedwell also trained and raced the Ross-owned filly Constancy who would earn the American Champion Two-Year-Old Filly title. For 1919, Bedwell won his second consecutive national earnings title.

In 1921, Guy Bedwell became part of a dispute involving J. K. L. Ross and the New York Jockey Club over the lifting of the ban on jockey Cal Shilling. Shilling worked for Bedwell as an exercise jockey and also helped with horse conditioning. Bedwell had testified before the Maryland State Racing Commission in support of Shilling's application for a jockey's license and as a result he too became a central figure in the controversy. The April 21, 1921, issue of the New York Times quoted from a letter by August Belmont Jr. to J. K. L. Ross saying "the entries of your stable will not be acceptable to this association if ex-Jockey Carroll Shilling or H. G. Bedwell is in any way connected, directly or indirectly, with the same." The matter resulted in Bedwell's horses racing primarily in Maryland for nearly twenty years before he was allowed to compete again at racetracks in New York State.

After winning the American Triple Crown with Sir Barton, Bedwell never trained another triple crown race winner but in Canada he won the 1924 and 1926 editions of the Breeders' Stakes, a race that now forms part of the Canadian Triple Crown series. After J. K. L. Ross encountered financial problems and was forced to liquidate his stables, Bedwell trained for various owners including, late in his career, for Elizabeth Arden's Maine Chance Farm.

His son, L. G. (Buster) Bedwell, also became a trainer. Still active in racing, Guy Bedwell died of a heart attack in 1951 having won more than 2,100 races. In 1971, he was posthumously inducted in the National Museum of Racing and Hall of Fame.

Bedwell was one of the trainers in American Thoroughbred horse racing historian Edward L. Bowen's 2007 book Masters of the Turf: Ten Trainers Who Dominated Horse Racing's Golden Age.
