= 1930 Kentucky Derby =

Horse race

56th Kentucky Derby
- Kentucky Derby
- Grade I stakes race
- Location: Churchill Downs
- Date: May 17, 1930
- Winning horse: Gallant Fox
- Jockey: Earl Sande
- Trainer: James E. Fitzsimmons
- Owner: Belair Stud
- Surface: Dirt

The 1930 Kentucky Derby was the 56th running of the Kentucky Derby. The race took place on May 17, 1930. Horse Busy scratched before the race.

== Full results ==
Finished	Post	Horse	Jockey	Trainer	Owner	Time / behind
1st	7	Gallant Fox	Earl Sande	James E. Fitzsimmons	Belair Stud	2:07.60
2nd	8	Gallant Knight	Herman Schutte	Kay Spence	Audley Farm Stable	2
3rd	3	Ned O.	J. D. Mooney	George W. Foreman	George W. Foreman	2
4th	10	Gone Away	Mack Garner	William J. Speirs	William Ziegler Jr.	1
5th	6	Crack Brigade	George Ellis	Julius Bauer	T. M. Cassidy	4
6th	1	Longus	R. O'Brien	Walter H. Hoffman Jr.	R.C. Stable (Walter H. Hoffman Jr.)	1/2
7th	2	Uncle Luther	Robert Creese	Robert L. Stivers	Luther Stivers	2
8th	12	Tannery	William Garner	Auval John Baker	E. F. Prichard	2
9th	14	Broadway Limited	Pete Walls	William T. Waggoner	Three D's Stock Farm	Head
10th	4	Alcibiades	Leo Jones	Walter W. Taylor	Hal Price Headley	1 1/2
11th	9	Kilkerry	Thomas May	William T. Waggoner	Three D's Stock Farm	Head
12th	13	Breezing Thru	Joseph Smith	Herbert J. Thompson	Edward R. Bradley	6
13th	15	Buckeye Poet	Eddie Legere	Herbert J. Thompson	Edward R. Bradley	5
14th	5	High Foot	Carl Meyer	John B. Partridge	Valley Lake Stable	1
15th	11	Dick O' Hara	Newton Barrett	Burton B. Williams	P. H. Joyce	8

- Winning Breeder: Belair Stud; (MD)

== Payout ==
Post	Horse	Win	Place	Show
7	Gallant Fox	$ 4.38	3.76	3.42
8	Gallant Knight		14.60	8.78
3	Ned O.			10.14

- The winner received a purse of $50,725 and a $5000 Gold Cup.
- Second place received $6,000.
- Third place received $3,000.
- Fourth place received $1,000.
