= 1949 Kentucky Derby =

Horse race

75th Kentucky Derby
- Kentucky Derby
- Grade I stakes race
- Location: Churchill Downs
- Date: May 7, 1949
- Distance: 1 1/4 miles (10 furlongs)
- Winning horse: Ponder
- Winning time: 2:04 1/5
- Jockey: Steve Brooks
- Trainer: Ben A. Jones
- Owner: Calumet Farm
- Surface: Dirt

The 1949 Kentucky Derby was the 75th running of the Kentucky Derby. The race took place on May 7, 1949, on a track rated fast.

== Full results ==
Finished	Post	Horse	Jockey	Trainer	Owner	Time / behind
1st	3	Ponder	Steve Brooks	Ben A. Jones	Calumet Farm	2:04 1/5
2nd	1	Capot	Ted Atkinson	John M. Gaver Sr.	Greentree Stable	
3rd	10	Palestinian	Hedley Woodhouse	Hirsch Jacobs	Isidor Bieber	
4th	6	Old Rockport	Gordon Glisson	Phil Reilly	Clifford Mooers	
5th	9	Halt	Conn McCreary	Woody Stephens	Woodvale Farm	
6th	5	Olympia	Eddie Arcaro	Ivan H. Parke	Fred W. Hooper	
7th	7	Model Cadet	Ovie Scurlock	R. Thomas Smith	Ada L. Rice	
8th	11	Duplicator	Basil James	Sam Sechrest	Mr. & Mrs. J. Harold Seley	
9th	8	Johns Joy	Johnny Adams	Monte Parke	John A. Kinard Jr.	
10th	4	Ky. Colonel	Melvin Peterson	John M. Goode	Joe A. Goodwin	
11th	13	Lextown	Jack Richard	Dave Hurn	Lexbrook Stable	
12th	2	Jacks Town	Walter Lee Taylor	Lester L. Jenkins	Afton Villa Farm	
13th	1A	Wine List	Douglas Dodson	John M. Gaver Sr.	Greentree Stable	
14th	12	Senecas Coin	Jimmy John Duff	Mrs. Albert Roth	Mrs. Albert Roth	

- Winning breeder: Calumet Farm (KY)
