= William Boland =

American jockey (born 1933)

Bill Boland
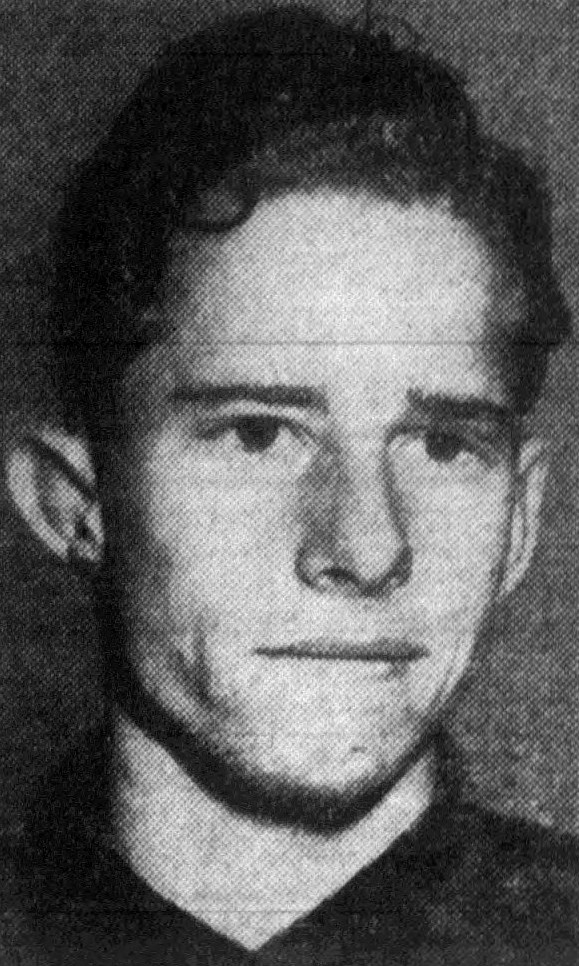
- Boland, circa 1954

Personal information
- Born: July 16, 1933 (age 93) Corpus Christi, Texas, U.S.
- Occupation: Jockey/ Trainer

Horse racing career
- Sport: Horse racing
- Career wins: 2,049

Major racing wins
- Diana Handicap (1950); Fashion Stakes (1950); Gallant Fox Handicap (1950); Saratoga Handicap (1950); Kentucky Oaks (1950); San Luis Obispo Handicap (1950); Arlington Handicap (1952); Marguerite Stakes (1952); Massachusetts Handicap (1952, 1956); Hawthorne Gold Cup (1952, 1956, 1962); Belmont Futurity Stakes (1953); Empire City Gold Cup (1953); Jockey Club Gold Cup (1953); National Stallion Stakes (1953); Acorn Stakes (1954); Alabama Stakes (1955); Frizette Stakes (1955); Gardenia Stakes (1955); Malibu Stakes (1955, 1960); San Marcos Stakes (1955); San Felipe Stakes (1955, 1960); Metropolitan Handicap (1956); San Antonio Handicap (1956); San Miguel Stakes (1956); Spinaway Stakes (1956, 1958); Whitney Handicap (1956); Dwyer Handicap (1957); Narragansett Special (1957); Grey Lag Handicap (1958); San Bernardino Handicap (1958, 1959); San Pasqual Handicap (1958); Santa Anita Oaks (1958); Santa Maria Handicap (1958); Man o' War Handicap (1959, 1962); Santa Anita Handicap (1959); Santa Catalina Handicap (1958, 1959); Stymie Handicap (1960, 1967); Hempstead Handicap (1961); Suburban Handicap (1962); Black Helen Handicap (1963, 1967); Widener Handicap (1963); Royal Palm Handicap (1965); Wood Memorial Stakes (1966); Amory L. Haskell Handicap (1968); Woodbine Oaks (1968) As a trainer: Gallant Fox Handicap (1978) American Classic Race wins: Kentucky Derby (1950); Belmont Stakes (1950, 1966)

Racing awards
- George Woolf Memorial Jockey Award (1959)

Honours
- National Museum of Racing and Hall of Fame (2006)

Significant horses
- Amberoid, Beau Purple, Better Self, Kissin' George, Middleground, Nasrina, Porterhouse, Terrang, Sword Dancer
- Updated on April 14, 2012

William Norris Boland (born July 16, 1933) is an American retired Hall of Fame jockey and trainer in Thoroughbred horse racing.

Boland began his riding career in 1949 at Belmont Park in Elmont, New York. While still a sixteen-year-old apprentice, riding Better Self for owner Robert J. Kleberg Jr.'s King Ranch and trainer Max Hirsch, Boland earned the first stakes race win of his career on April 29, 1950, in the Gallant Fox Handicap at Jamaica Race Course. He went on to the Kentucky Oaks aboard Ari's Mona then the following day rode Middleground to victory in the Kentucky Derby. Boland missed winning the U.S. Triple Crown series that year when he and Middleground finished second after a rough trip in the Preakness Stakes but then won the Belmont Stakes. In 1966 Boland won his second Belmont Stakes aboard Amberoid for trainer Lucien Laurin.

Widely respected by his peers, in 1959 Bill Boland received the George Woolf Memorial Jockey Award given to the North American jockey who demonstrates high standards of personal and professional conduct, on and off the racetrack.

Bill Boland retired from racing in 1969 and turned to training horses for a time. He was inducted into the United States Racing Hall of Fame in 2006.

Preceded by Sam Boulmetis	Jockeys' Guild President; 1967-1969	Succeeded by Walter Blum
