= 1914 Kentucky Derby =

Horse race

40th Kentucky Derby
- Kentucky Derby
- Grade I stakes race
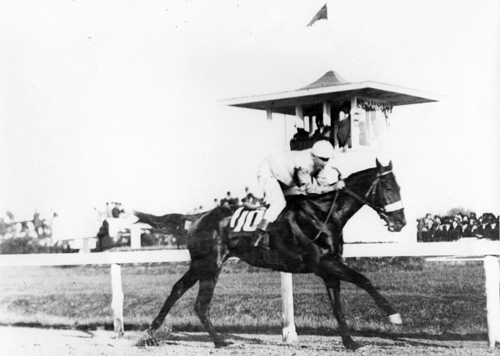
- Old Rosebud winning the 1914 Kentucky Derby
- Location: Churchill Downs
- Date: May 9, 1914
- Winning horse: Old Rosebud
- Jockey: John McCabe
- Trainer: Frank D. Weir
- Owner: Hamilton C. Applegate
- Surface: Dirt

The 1914 Kentucky Derby was the 40th running of the Kentucky Derby. The race took place on May 9, 1914. Betting favorite Old Rosebud led the entire race, winning by eight lengths. The winning time of 2.03.40 set a new Derby record, which smashed the previous year's record set by longshot Donerail. Churchill Downs president Matt Winn channeled Old Rosebud's record setting run into considerable publicity for the Derby.

== Full results ==
Finished	Post	Horse	Jockey	Trainer	Owner	Time / behind
1st	10	Old Rosebud	John McCabe	Frank D. Weir	Hamilton C. Applegate	2:03.40
2nd	7	Hodge	William Taylor	Kay Spence	Kay Spence	8
3rd	4	Bronzewing	Jack Hanover	Dan Lehan	Alex P. Humphrey Jr.	1 1/2
4th	3	John Gund	George Byrne	Auval John Baker	Auval John Baker	4
5th	1	Old Ben	Clarence Turner	William H. Buckner	William G. Yanke	6
6th	5	Surprising	Charles Peak	Richard F. Carman Sr.	Richard F. Carman Sr.	2
7th	2	Watermelon	W. French	William G. Walker	John E. Madden	3

- Winning Breeder: John E. Madden; (KY)
- Horses Ivan Gardner, Brickley, Belloc, and Constant scratched before the race

== Payout ==
Post	Horse	Win	Place	Show
10	Old Rosebud	$ 3.70	3.00	2.80
7	Hodge		3.60	3.60
4	Bronzewing			4.00

- The winner received a purse of $9,125.
- Second place received $2,000.
- Third place received $1,000.
