= Kentucky Derby =

American stakes race for Thoroughbreds, part of the Triple Crown

- Previous: 2026 Kentucky Derby; May 2, 2026; Next: 2027 Kentucky Derby; May 1, 2027
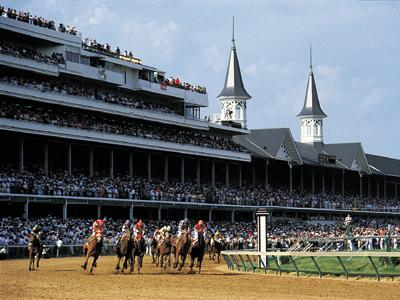
- "The Most Exciting Two Minutes in Sports" "The Run for the Roses" "The First Jewel of the Triple Crown"
- Class: Grade I
- Location: Churchill Downs; Louisville, Kentucky, U.S.
- Inaugurated: May 17, 1875 (151 years ago)
- Race type: Thoroughbred
- Sponsor: Woodford Reserve (Brown–Forman)
- Website: kentuckyderby.com

Race information
- Distance: 1 1/4 miles (10 furlongs; 2 km)
- Record: 1:59.4, Secretariat (1973) more
- Surface: Dirt
- Track: Left-handed
- Qualification: 3-year-old
- Weight: Colt/Gelding: 126 lbs (57.2 kg); Filly: 121 lb (55 kg)
- Purse: US$5 million 1st: $3.1 million

The Kentucky Derby (/ˈdɜːrbi/) is an American Grade I stakes race run at Churchill Downs in Louisville, Kentucky. The race is run by three-year-old Thoroughbreds at a distance of 1 1/4 miles (10 furlongs; 2,012 metres). Colts and geldings carry 126 pounds (57 kilograms) and fillies 121 pounds (55 kilograms).

Held annually on the first Saturday in May, the Derby is the first leg of the Triple Crown and will be the first race in the planned Thoroughbred Championship Series from Churchill Downs and New York Racing Association. It is preceded by the two-week-long Kentucky Derby Festival. The race is known as "The Run for the Roses", as the winning horse is draped in a blanket of roses. Lasting approximately two minutes, the Derby has been alternately called "The Most Exciting Two Minutes in Sports", "The Fastest Two Minutes in Sports", or "The Greatest Two Minutes in Sports", coined by Churchill Downs president Matt Winn. At least two of these descriptions are thought to be derived from the words of sportswriter Grantland Rice, when in 1935 he said "Those two minutes and a second or so of derby running carry more emotional thrills, per second, than anything sport can show."

The race was first run in 1875. Unlike the other, older races of the Triple Crown—the Preakness Stakes and the Belmont Stakes—along with the Travers Stakes (the oldest comparable stakes race in the US), the Kentucky Derby and its sibling race, the Kentucky Oaks, have been run every year since inception. Further, the Derby and the Oaks are the oldest major sporting events in the US held annually since their beginning, although they were twice rescheduled within the same year, the first time due to World War II in 1945, and the second time due to the COVID-19 pandemic in 2020. Among thoroughbred stakes races, they are the oldest that have been held annually on the same track every year.

The Derby is the most-watched and most-attended horse race in the United States. The 152nd took place on Saturday, May 2, 2026, with Golden Tempo winning the event.

== History ==
In 1872, Col. Meriwether Lewis Clark Jr., grandson of William Clark of the Lewis and Clark Expedition, traveled to England, visiting Epsom in Surrey where The Derby had been running annually since 1780. From there, Clark went on to Paris where a group of racing enthusiasts had formed the French Jockey Club in 1863. They had organized the Grand Prix de Paris at Longchamp, which at the time was the greatest race in France. Returning home to Kentucky, Clark organized the Louisville Jockey Club and Driving Park Association to raise money for building quality racing facilities just outside the city. First known as the Louisville Jockey Club grounds, seven years later the track was commonly referred to as Churchill Downs, named for John and Henry Churchill, who provided the land for the racetrack. The naming went official in 1937.

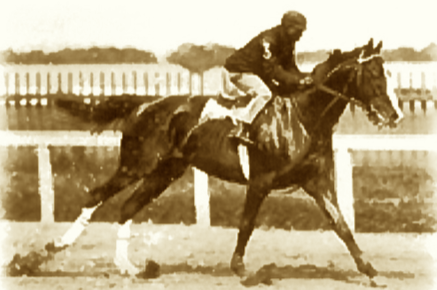
Alan-A-Dale, ridden by jockey Jimmy Winkfield won the Derby in 1902.

The Kentucky Derby was first run at 1 1/2 miles (12 furlongs; 2.4 km) the same distance as the Epsom Derby, before changing lengths in 1896 to its current 1 1/4 miles (10 furlongs; 2 km). On May 17, 1875, in front of an estimated crowd of 10,000 people, a field of 15 three-year-old horses contested the first Derby. Under jockey Oliver Lewis, a colt named Aristides, who was trained by future Hall of Famer Ansel Williamson, won the inaugural Derby. Later that year, Lewis rode Aristides to a second-place finish in the Belmont Stakes.

In these early decades, Black jockeys were very influential at the Derby. Horses, including race horses, had been cared for, trained and exercised by Blacks in the ante-bellum slave-holding states and this expertise laid the groundwork for future racing standards. Jockeying was seen as activity unsuitable for Whites during that era and in the decades after the Civil War when it was becoming lucrative. Black jockeys dominated the Derby in all the years before 1894, except for one. In 1886 the track, which had been successful, ran into financial difficulties when a protracted, gambling-related horseman boycott removed it from the upper echelons of racing until just after the turn of the 20th century. In 1894 the New Louisville Jockey Club was incorporated with new capital and improved facilities. The rise of on-track betting and increasing audience sizes brought larger purse sizes, and this began to attract White jockeys to the profession. White jockeys on tracks everywhere began to use violence to attack and intimidate Black jockeys and the horses they rode. This caused horse owners to stop hiring Black jockeys. Though they were consistent Derby winners, Black jockeys began to disappear from the Derby after 1894. Jimmy Winkfield was the last Black jockey to win the derby and Black jockeys were gone by 1911. But they had instituted innovations now universal in the sport. Willie Simms won the Derby in 1896 and 1898 on the shortened stirrups he evolved from those used by Black jockeys before him. After his racing career, Oliver Lewis began collecting and analyzing racing data, developing a system very much like the ones used today.

Initially a successful venue, the track ran into financial difficulties due to a protracted, gambling-related horseman boycott removing it from the upper echelons of racing that would last until just after the turn of the 20th century. In 1894 the New Louisville Jockey Club was incorporated with the new capital and improved facilities. Despite this, the business floundered until 1902, when a syndicate led by Col. Matt Winn of Louisville acquired the facility. Under Winn, Churchill Downs prospered, and the Kentucky Derby then became the preeminent stakes race for three-year-old thoroughbred horses in North America.

Thoroughbred owners began sending their successful Derby horses to compete in two other races. These two are the Preakness Stakes at the Pimlico Race Course, in Baltimore, and the Belmont Stakes in Elmont, New York. The three races offered large purses, and in 1919, Sir Barton became the first horse to win all three races. However, the term "Triple Crown" did not come into use for another eleven years. In 1930, when Gallant Fox became the second horse to win all three races, sportswriter Charles Hatton brought the phrase into American usage. Fueled by the media, public interest in the possibility of a "superhorse" that could win the Triple Crown began in the weeks leading up to the Derby. Two years after the term went in use, the race (until that time ran in mid-May since inception) changed the date to the first Saturday in May. This change allows for a specific schedule for the Triple Crown races. Since 1931, the order of Triple Crown races has been the Kentucky Derby first, followed by the Preakness Stakes and then the Belmont Stakes. Before 1931, eleven times the Preakness was run before the Derby. On May 12, 1917, and again on May 13, 1922, the Preakness and the Derby took place on the same day. On eleven occasions the Belmont Stakes was run before the Preakness Stakes, and in 2020, the Belmont was run first, then the Kentucky Derby, and the Preakness Stakes last.

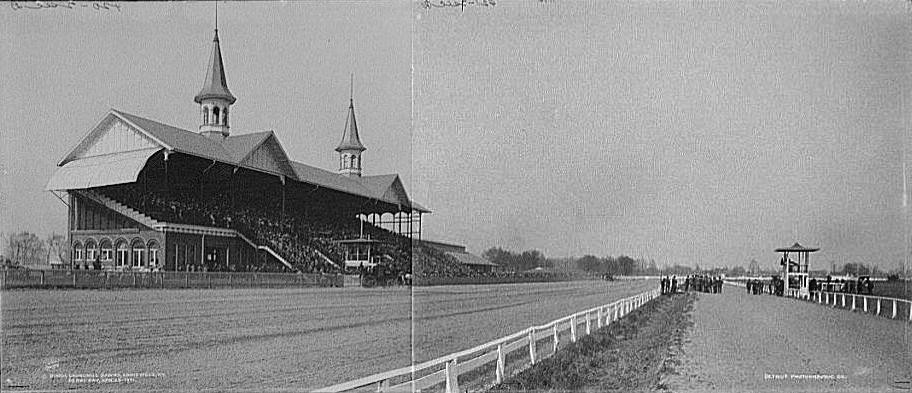
Churchill Downs in 1901

On May 16, 1925, the first live radio broadcast of the Kentucky Derby aired on WHAS as well as on WGN in Chicago. On May 7, 1949, the first television coverage of the Kentucky Derby took place, produced by WAVE-TV, the NBC affiliate in Louisville. This coverage was aired live in the Louisville market and sent to NBC as a kinescope newsreel recording for national broadcast. On May 3, 1952, the first national television coverage of the Kentucky Derby took place, aired from then-CBS affiliate WHAS-TV. In 1954, the purse exceeded US$100,000 for the first time. In 1968, Dancer's Image became the first horse to win the race and then face disqualification. A urine test revealed traces of phenylbutazone (an anti-inflammatory painkiller drug) inside Dancer's Image. Forward Pass won after a protracted legal battle by the owners of Dancer's Image (which they lost). Forward Pass thus became the eighth winner for Calumet Farm. Unexpectedly, the regulations at Kentucky thoroughbred race tracks were changed some years later, allowing horses to run on phenylbutazone. In 1970, Diane Crump became the first female jockey to ride in the Derby, finishing 15th aboard Fathom.

The fastest time ever run in the Derby was in 1973 at 1:59.4 minutes, when Secretariat broke the record set by Northern Dancer in 1964. Also during that race, Secretariat did something unique in Triple Crown races: for each successive quarter run, his times were faster. Although the races do not record times for non-winners, in 1973 Sham finished second, two and a half lengths behind Secretariat in the same race. Using the thoroughbred racing convention of one length equaling one-fifth of a second to calculate Sham's time, he also finished in under two minutes. Another sub-two-minute finish, only the third, was set in 2001 by Monarchos at 1:59.97, the first year the race used hundredths of seconds instead of fifths in timing.

In 2005, the purse distribution for the Derby changed, so that horses finishing fifth would henceforth receive a share of the purse; previously only the first four finishers did so.

The Kentucky Derby began offering $3 million in purse money in 2019. Churchill Downs officials have cited the success of historical race wagering terminals at their Derby City Gaming facility in Louisville as a factor behind the purse increase. The Derby first offered a $1 million purse in 1996; it was doubled to $2 million in 2005.

In 2020, the Derby was postponed from May 2 to September 5 due to the COVID-19 pandemic. This was the second time in history the race had been postponed, the other being in 1945. Churchill Downs used a new singular 20-stall starting gate for the 2020 Kentucky Derby, replacing the previous arrangement that used a standard 14-stall gate and an auxiliary six-stall gate. The old setup contributed to congestion at the start of the race, especially in the gap between the two gates.

Rich Strike, a reserve who only made it into the final field after a late scratching, won the race in 2022 at final odds of 80:1 and parimutuel betting payouts were even larger.

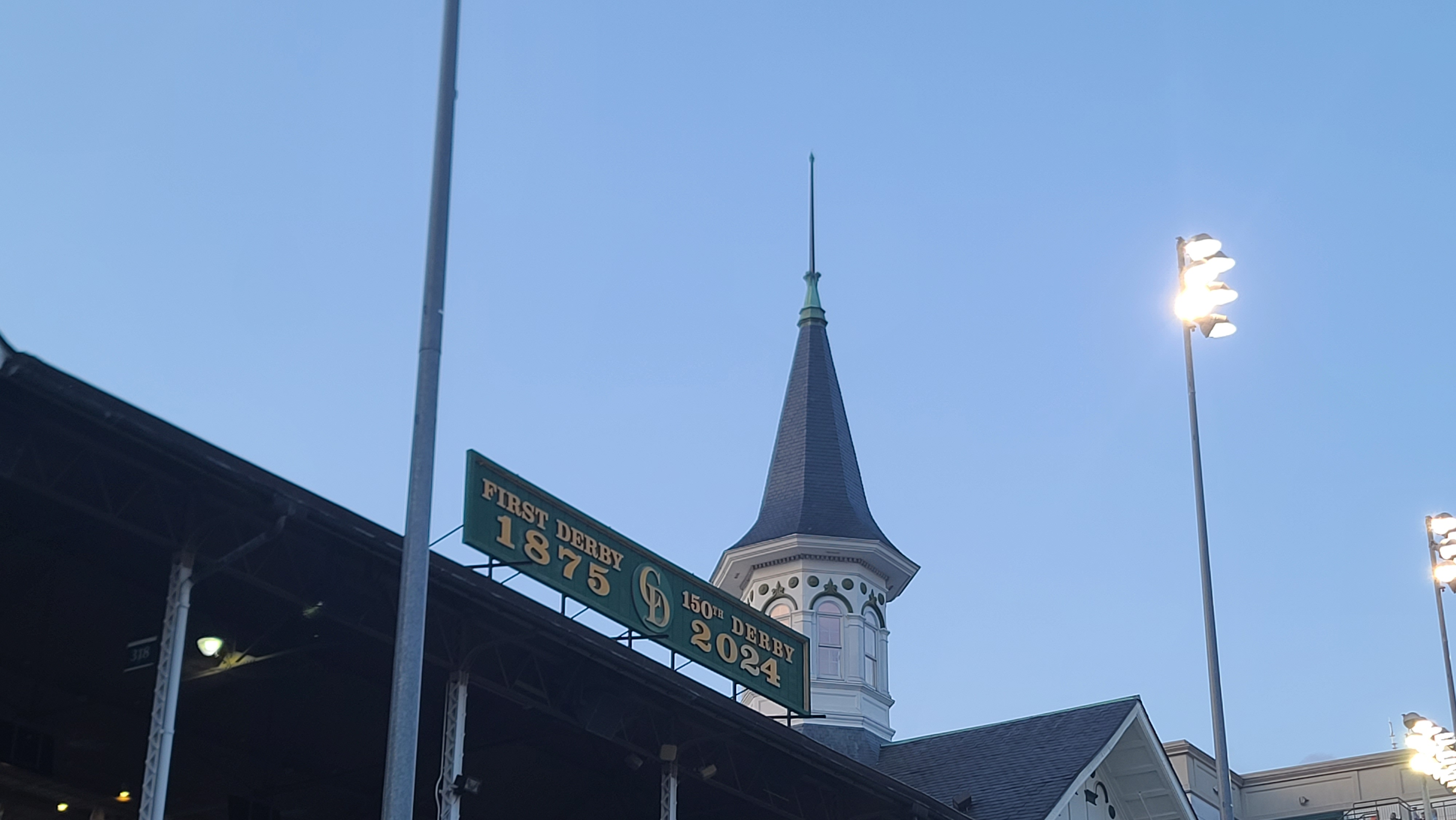
Churchill Downs sign for the 2024 Kentucky Derby, its 150th running, with one of the twin spires in the background

In January 2024, the purse for the Kentucky Derby was increased to $5 million.

In the 2026 Kentucky Derby, Cherie DeVaux became the first woman trainer to ever win the Kentucky Derby, as the trainer of Golden Tempo.

On August 5, 2026, Churchill Downs Incorporated and the New York Racing Association (NYRA) announced the Thoroughbred Championship Series (TCS), a six-race series for three-year-old thoroughbreds that is set to begin in 2027. The Kentucky Derby was designated as the first race of the new series.

=== Attendance ===
Millions of people worldwide bet at various live tracks and online sportsbooks. In 2017, a crowd of 158,070 watched Always Dreaming win the Derby, making it the seventh biggest attendance in the history of the racetrack. The track reported a wagering total of $209.2 million from all the sources on all the races on the Kentucky Derby Day program. It was a 9% increase compared to the total of $192.6 million in 2016 and an increase of 8% over the previous record set in 2015 of $194.3 million. TwinSpires, a platform for betting online and a partner of the Kentucky Derby and the Breeders' Cup, recorded $32.8 million in handle on the Churchill Down races for the Kentucky Derby Day program. This record was a 22% increase over the preceding year. On the Kentucky Derby race alone, the handle of TwinSpires was $20.1 million, which is a 22% rise compared to the prior year.

The race often draws celebrities. HM Queen Elizabeth II, on a visit to the United States, joined the racegoers at Churchill Downs in 2007.

=== Sponsorship ===
The 2004 Kentucky Derby marked the first time that jockeys—as a result of a court order—were allowed to wear corporate advertising logos on their clothing.

Norman Adams has been the designer of the Kentucky Derby Logo since 2002. On February 1, 2006, the Louisville-based fast-food company Yum! Brands, Inc. announced a corporate sponsorship deal to call the race "The Kentucky Derby presented by Yum! Brands." In 2018, Woodford Reserve replaced Yum! Brands as the presenting sponsor.

The Swiss watchmaker Longines is the official sponsor timekeeper of the Kentucky Derby.

== Traditions ==
In addition to the race itself, several traditions play a significant role in the Derby atmosphere. The mint julep—an iced drink consisting of bourbon, mint, and sugar syrup—is the traditional beverage of the race. The historic beverage comes served in an ice-frosted silver julep cup. However, most Churchill Downs patrons sip theirs from souvenir glasses (first offered in 1939 and available in revised form each year since) printed with all previous Derby winners. Also, burgoo, a thick stew of beef, chicken, pork, and vegetables, is a popular Kentucky dish served at the Derby.

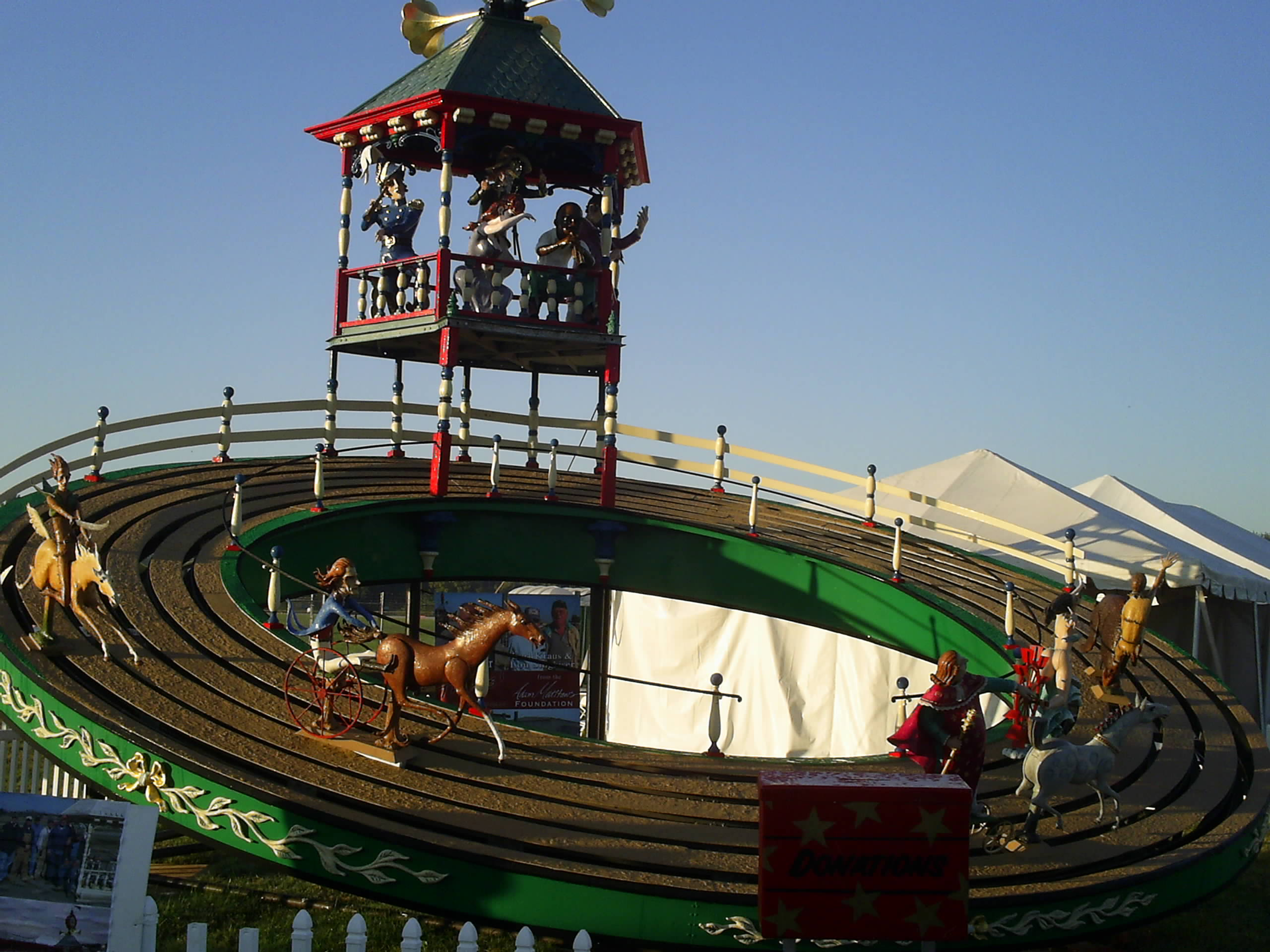
Louisville Clock (often called the Louisville Derby Clock), which was dismantled in 2015

The infield—a spectator area inside the track—offers general admission prices but little chance of seeing much of the race, particularly before the jumbotron installation in 2014. Instead, revelers show up in the infield to party with abandon. By contrast, "Millionaire's Row" refers to the expensive box seats that attract the rich, the famous and the well-connected. Women appear in elegant outfits lavishly accessorized with large, elaborate hats. Following the Call to the Post played on bugle by Steve Buttleman, as the horses start to parade before the grandstands, the University of Louisville Cardinal Marching Band plays Stephen Foster's "My Old Kentucky Home" while sung by the University of Louisville Cardinal Singers, except in 2020 when the song was played on bugle by Buttleman. This song is a tradition which began in 1921. The event attracts spectators from a large area, flying in hundreds of private aircraft to Louisville Muhammad Ali International Airport.

The Derby is frequently referred to as "The Run for the Roses", because a lush blanket of 554 red roses is awarded to the Kentucky Derby winner each year. New York sports columnist and future Churchill Downs president Bill Corum in 1925 began describing the race thusly, but the tradition originated in 1883 when New York City socialite E. Berry Wall presented roses to ladies at a post-Derby party. The Churchill Downs founder and president, Col. Meriwether Lewis Clark Jr., attended that event. This gesture is believed to have led Clark to the idea of making the rose the race's official flower. However, it was not until 1896 that any recorded account referred to draping roses on the Derby winner. The Governor of Kentucky and the Chairman of Churchill Downs Incorporated present the garland and the Kentucky Derby Trophy to the winner. Pop vocalist Dan Fogelberg composed the song "Run for the Roses", released in time for the 1980 running of the race.

=== Riders Up! ===
"Riders Up!" is the traditional command from the Paddock Judge for jockeys to mount their horses in advance of the upcoming race. This command typically occurs across from Stall 1 in the Saddling Paddock around 19 minutes in advance of the start of the race. After the command, jockeys receive a leg up on their mounts and immediately turn right to the Paddock Runway, which leads to the racetrack. Since 2012, a celebrity attendee recites this phrase.

Celebrity "Riders Up" announcers

- 2012: John Calipari
- 2013: Charlie Strong
- 2014: Julius Erving
- 2015: Teddy Bridgewater
- 2016: Sean Payton
- 2017: Jeff Bridges
- 2018: Laila Ali
- 2019: Baker Mayfield
- 2020: No announcer due to COVID-19 pandemic
- 2021: D. Wayne Lukas
- 2022: Jack Harlow
- 2023: Patrick Mahomes
- 2024: Martha Stewart
- 2025: Simone Biles
- 2026: Pat Day

=== National Anthem performers ===
The following artists have performed the National Anthem at the Derby:

- 2009: LeAnn Rimes
- 2010: Rascal Flatts
- 2011: Jordin Sparks
- 2012: Mary J. Blige
- 2013: Martina McBride
- 2014: Jo Dee Messina
- 2015: Josh Groban
- 2016: Lady Antebellum
- 2017: Harry Connick Jr.
- 2018: Pentatonix
- 2019: Jennifer Nettles
- 2021: Tori Kelly
- 2022: Brittney Spencer
- 2023: Carly Pearce
- 2024: Wynonna Judd (accompanied by drummer and husband Cactus Moser)
- 2025: Grace Potter
- 2026: Susan Tedeschi and Derek Trucks of Tedeschi Trucks Band

=== Festival ===
In the weeks preceding the race, numerous activities took place for the Kentucky Derby Festival. Thunder Over Louisville—an airshow and fireworks display—generally begins the festivities in earnest two weeks before the Derby.

== Records ==
=== Horse records ===
Secretariat set the record for speed in 1973 with a time of 1:59.4. During its first two decades when the Derby was run at 1 1/2 miles, the record was 2:34.5, set by Spokane in 1889.

Four different horses won by 8 lengths: Old Rosebud in 1914, Johnstown in 1939, Whirlaway in 1941, and Assault in 1946.

The highest odds of a winning horse were 91 to 1 for Donerail in 1913. The second-highest odds occurred in 2022, when Rich Strike went off at 80 to 1 and won the race.

Three horses have won the Kentucky Derby without competing as a two-year-old: Apollo (1882), Justify (2018), and Mage (2023).

=== Jockey records ===
107 jockeys have won the Kentucky Derby, with 27 doing so multiple times. Isaac Murphy (1890–91), Jimmy Winkfield (1901–02), Ron Turcotte (1972–73), Eddie Delahoussaye (1982–83), Calvin Borel (2009–10), and Victor Espinoza (2014–15) are the only jockeys to win the Derby in back-to-back years. Borel is the only jockey with three wins in a four-year span (2007, 2009–10).

Multi-time Kentucky Derby-winning jockeys
Jockey	Wins	Mounts	Years won
Eddie Arcaro	5	21	1938, 1941, 1945, 1948, 1952
Bill Hartack	5	12	1957, 1960, 1962, 1964, 1969
Bill Shoemaker	4	26	1955, 1959, 1965, 1986
Isaac Murphy	3	11	1884, 1890, 1891
Earl Sande	3	8	1923, 1925, 1930
Ángel Cordero Jr.	3	17	1974, 1976, 1985
Gary Stevens	3	22	1988, 1995, 1997
Kent Desormeaux	3	22	1998, 2000, 2008
Calvin Borel	3	12	2007, 2009, 2010
Victor Espinoza	3	10	2002, 2014, 2015
John Velazquez	3	24	2011, 2017, 2020
Willie Simms	2	2	1896, 1898
Jimmy Winkfield	2	4	1901, 1902
Johnny Loftus	2	6	1916, 1919
Albert Johnson	2	7	1922, 1926
Linus McAtee	2	7	1927, 1929
Charley Kurtsinger	2	4	1931, 1937
Conn McCreary	2	10	1944, 1951
Ismael Valenzuela	2	8	1958, 1968
Ron Turcotte	2	5	1972, 1973
Jacinto Vásquez	2	8	1975, 1980
Eddie Delahoussaye	2	13	1982, 1983
Chris McCarron	2	18	1987, 1994
Chris Antley	2	17	1991, 1999
Jerry Bailey	2	8	1993, 1996
Mike Smith	2	28	2005, 2018
Mario Gutierrez	2	3	2012, 2016

=== Trainer records ===
116 trainers have won the Kentucky Derby, with 19 doing so multiple times. Six trainers have won the Derby in back-to-back years: Herbert J. Thompson (1932–33), Ben Jones (1948–49), Jimmy Jones (1957–58), Lucien Laurin (1972–73), D. Wayne Lukas (1995–96), and Bob Baffert (1997–98).

Multi-time Kentucky Derby-winning trainers
Trainer	Wins	Starts	Years won
Ben Jones	6	11	1938, 1941, 1944, 1948, 1949, 1952
Bob Baffert	6	24	1997, 1998, 2002, 2015, 2018, 2020
Herbert J. Thompson	4	26	1921, 1926, 1932, 1933
D. Wayne Lukas	4	49	1988, 1995, 1996, 1999
James Fitzsimmons	3	11	1930, 1935, 1939
Max Hirsch	3	14	1936, 1946, 1950
James Rowe Sr.	2	17	1881, 1915
Jimmy Jones	2	4	1957, 1958
Horatio Luro	2	4	1962, 1964
Henry Forrest	2	2	1966, 1968
Lucien Laurin	2	5	1972, 1973
Laz Barrera	2	5	1976, 1978
LeRoy Jolley	2	13	1975, 1980
Woody Stephens	2	14	1974, 1984
Charlie Whittingham	2	7	1986, 1989
Nick Zito	2	26	1991, 1994
Carl Nafzger	2	3	1990, 2007
Doug O'Neill	2	8	2012, 2016
Todd Pletcher	2	62	2010, 2017
William I. Mott	2	6	2019, 2025

=== Owner records ===
Seventeen owners have won the Kentucky Derby multiple times with horses they fully or partially owned.

Owner	Wins	Starts	Years won
Calumet Farm	8	28	1941, 1944, 1948, 1949, 1952, 1957, 1958, 1968
Edward R. Bradley	4	28	1921, 1926, 1932, 1933
Belair Stud	3	8	1930, 1935, 1939
Bashford Manor Stable	2	11	1892, 1906
Harry Payne Whitney	2	19	1915, 1927
Greentree Stable	2	19	1931, 1942
Fannie Hertz	2	3	1928, 1943
King Ranch	2	5	1946, 1950
Darby Dan Farm	2	7	1963, 1967
Meadow Stable	2	4	1972, 1973
Arthur B. Hancock III*	2	6	1982, 1989
William J. Condren*	2	4	1991, 1994
Joseph M. Cornacchia*	2	3	1991, 1994
Bob & Beverly Lewis	2	9	1997, 1999
J. Paul Reddam	2	7	2012, 2016
WinStar Farm*	2	23	2010, 2018
Starlight Racing*	2	13	2018, 2020

* Partnered with other entities in an ownership group for one or more winning horses.

=== "Oaks/Derby Double" ===
Jockeys, trainers, and owners competing in the Kentucky Derby often will compete in the Kentucky Oaks, a race for fillies held the day before the Derby. Winning both these races in the same year is referred to as an "Oaks/Derby Double;" 8 jockeys, 3 trainers, and 5 owners have accomplished this feat:

Year	Kentucky Oaks winner	Kentucky Derby winner	Jockey	Trainer	Owner
1884*	Modesty	Buchanan	Isaac Murphy	different	different
1933*	Barn Swallow	Brokers Tip	Don Meade	Herbert J. Thompson	Edward R. Bradley
1949	Wistful	Ponder	different	Ben Jones	different
1950	Ari's Mona	Middleground	Bill Boland	different	different
1952	Real Delight	Hill Gail	Eddie Arcaro	Ben Jones	Calumet Farm
1966	Native Street	Kauai King	Don Brumfield	different	different
1993	Dispute	Sea Hero	Jerry Bailey	different	different
2009	Rachel Alexandra	Mine That Bird	Calvin Borel	different	different
2018	Monomoy Girl	Justify	different	different	Head of Plains Partners/Monomoy Stables
2024	Thorpedo Anna	Mystik Dan	Brian Hernandez Jr.	Kenneth G. McPeek	different
2025	Good Cheer	Sovereignty	different	different	Godolphin
2026	Always a Runner	Golden Tempo	José Ortiz	different	different

*Until the 1950s, the Oaks was held several days or weeks after the Derby.

== Winners ==
Triple Crown winners are in bold and highlighted with gold.

Kentucky Derby winners
Year	Winner	Jockey	Trainer	Owner	Distance (miles)	Track condition	Time (Note: The race was timed to 1/4 second from 1875 to 1905, to 1/5 second from 1906 to 2000, and to 0.01 second since 2001.)
1875	Aristides	Oliver Lewis	Ansel Williamson	Hal Price McGrath	1 1/2	Fast	2:37.75
1876	Vagrant	Robert Swim	James Williams	William Astor Jr.	1 1/2	Fast	2:38.25
1877	Baden-Baden	Billy Walker	Ed Brown	Daniel Swigert	1 1/2	Fast	2:38.00
1878	Day Star	Jimmy Carter	Lee Paul	Thomas J. Nichols	1 1/2	Fast	2:37.25
1879	Lord Murphy	Charlie Shauer	George Rice	George W. Darden & Co.	1 1/2	Fast	2:37.00
1880	Fonso	George Lewis	Tice Hutsell	J.S. Shawhan	1 1/2	Fast	2:37.50
1881	Hindoo †‡	Jim McLaughlin	James Rowe Sr.	Dwyer Brothers	1 1/2	Fast	2:40.00
1882	Apollo	Babe Hurd	Green B. Morris	Green B. Morris, James D. Patton	1 1/2	Fast	2:40.25
1883	Leonatus	William Donohue	Raleigh Colston Sr.	Jack P. Chinn, George Morgan	1 1/2	Heavy	2:43.00
1884	Buchanan	Isaac Murphy	William Bird	William Cottrill, Sam S. Brown	1 1/2	Good	2:40.25
1885	Joe Cotton	Erskine Henderson	Abraham Perry	James T. Williams	1 1/2	Good	2:37.25
1886	Ben Ali	Paul Duffy	Jim Murphy	James B. Haggin	1 1/2	Fast	2:36.50
1887	Montrose	Isaac Lewis	John McGinty	Labold Brothers	1 1/2	Fast	2:39.25
1888	Macbeth II	George Covington	John Campbell	Chicago Stable	1 1/2	Fast	2:38.25
1889	Spokane	Thomas Kiley	John Rodegap	Noah Armstrong	1 1/2	Fast	2:34.50
1890	Riley	Isaac Murphy	Edward Corrigan	Edward Corrigan	1 1/2	Muddy	2:45.00
1891	Kingman	Isaac Murphy	Dudley Allen	Jacobin Stable	1 1/2	Fast	2:52.25
1892	Azra	Alonzo Clayton	John Morris	Bashford Manor Stable	1 1/2	Heavy	2:41.50
1893	Lookout	Eddie Kunze	William McDaniel	J.E. Cushin, J. Orth	1 1/2	Fast	2:39.25
1894	Chant	Frank Goodale	Eugene Leigh	Eugene Leigh, Robert Rose	1 1/2	Fast	2:41.00
1895	Halma	James Perkins	Byron McClelland	Byron McClelland	1 1/2	Fast	2:37.50
1896	Ben Brush †‡	Willie Simms	Hardy Campbell	Mike F. Dwyer	1 1/4	Fast	2:07.75
1897	Typhoon II	Buttons Garner	Julius C. Cahn	Julius C. Cahn	1 1/4	Heavy	2:12.50
1898	Plaudit	Willie Simms	John E. Madden	John E. Madden	1 1/4	Good	2:09.00
1899	Manuel	Fred Taral	Robert Walden	A. H. & D. H. Morris	1 1/4	Fast	2:12.00
1900	Lieut. Gibson	Jimmy Boland	Charles Hughes	Charles H. Smith	1 1/4	Fast	2:06.25
1901	His Eminence	Jimmy Winkfield	Frank B. Van Meter	Frank B. Van Meter	1 1/4	Fast	2:07.75
1902	Alan-a-Dale	Jimmy Winkfield	Thomas Clay McDowell	Thomas Clay McDowell	1 1/4	Fast	2:08.75
1903	Judge Himes	Harold Booker	John P. Mayberry	Charles R. Ellison	1 1/4	Fast	2:09.00
1904	Elwood	Shorty Prior	Charles Durnell	Laska Durnell	1 1/4	Fast	2:08.50
1905	Agile	Jack Martin	Robert Tucker	Samuel S. Brown	1 1/4	Heavy	2:10.75
1906	Sir Huon	Roscoe Troxler	Peter Coyne	Bashford Manor Stable	1 1/4	Fast	2:08.80
1907	Pink Star	Andy Minder	William H. Fizer	J. Hal Woodford	1 1/4	Heavy	2:12.60
1908	Stone Street	Arthur Pickens	John Hall	C. E. & J. W. Hamilton	1 1/4	Heavy	2:15.20
1909	Wintergreen	Vincent Powers	Charles Mack	Jerome B. Respess	1 1/4	Slow	2:08.20
1910	Donau	Frederick Herbert	George Ham	William Gerst	1 1/4	Fast	2:06.40
1911	Meridian	George Archibald	Albert Ewing	Richard F. Carman	1 1/4	Fast	2:05.00
1912	Worth	Carroll Shilling	Frank Taylor	Harry Hallenbeck	1 1/4	Muddy	2:09.40
1913	Donerail	Roscoe Goose	Thomas P. Hayes	Thomas P. Hayes	1 1/4	Fast	2:04.80
1914	Old Rosebud †‡	John McCabe	Frank Weir	Hamilton Applegate	1 1/4	Fast	2:03.40
1915	Regret #†‡	Joe Notter	James Rowe Sr.	Harry Payne Whitney	1 1/4	Fast	2:05.40
1916	George Smith	Johnny Loftus	Hollie Hughes	John Sanford	1 1/4	Fast	2:04.00
1917	Omar Khayyam	Charles Borel	Charles T. Patterson	C.K.G. Billings, Frederick Johnson	1 1/4	Fast	2:04.60
1918	Exterminator †‡	Willie Knapp	Henry McDaniel	Willis Sharpe Kilmer	1 1/4	Muddy	2:10.80
**1919**	**Sir Barton †‡**	**Johnny Loftus**	**H. Guy Bedwell**	**J. K. L. Ross**	**1 1/4**	**Heavy**	**2:09.80**
1920	Paul Jones	Ted Rice	William Garth	Ral Parr	1 1/4	Slow	2:09.00
1921	Behave Yourself	Charles Thompson	Herbert J. Thompson	Edward R. Bradley	1 1/4	Fast	2:04.20
1922	Morvich	Albert Johnson	Fred Burlew	Ben Block	1 1/4	Fast	2:04.60
1923	Zev †‡	Earl Sande	David Leary	Rancocas Stable	1 1/4	Fast	2:05.40
1924	Black Gold †‡	John Mooney	Hanley Webb	Rosa Hoots	1 1/4	Fast	2:05.20
1925	Flying Ebony	Earl Sande	William Duke	Gifford Cochran	1 1/4	Sloppy	2:07.60
1926	Bubbling Over	Albert Johnson	Herbert J. Thompson	Edward R. Bradley (Idle Hour Stock Farm)	1 1/4	Fast	2:03.80
1927	Whiskery	Linus McAtee	Fred Hopkins	Harry Payne Whitney	1 1/4	Slow	2:06.00
1928	Reigh Count †‡	Chick Lang	Bert Michell	Fannie Hertz	1 1/4	Heavy	2:10.40
1929	Clyde Van Dusen	Linus McAtee	Clyde Van Dusen	Herbert Gardner	1 1/4	Muddy	2:10.8
**1930**	**Gallant Fox †‡**	**Earl Sande**	**Jim Fitzsimmons**	**Belair Stud**	**1 1/4**	**Good**	**2:07.60**
1931	Twenty Grand †‡	Charley Kurtsinger	James Rowe Jr.	Greentree Stable	1 1/4	Fast	2:01.80
1932	Burgoo King	Eugene James	Herbert J. Thompson	Edward R. Bradley	1 1/4	Fast	2:05.20
1933	Brokers Tip	Don Meade	Herbert J. Thompson	Edward R. Bradley	1 1/4	Good	2:06.80
1934	Cavalcade †‡	Mack Garner	Bob Smith	Brookmeade Stable	1 1/4	Fast	2:04.00
**1935**	**Omaha †‡**	Willie Saunders	Jim Fitzsimmons	Belair Stud	1 1/4	Good	2:05.00
1936	Bold Venture	Ira Hanford	Max Hirsch	Morton Schwartz	1 1/4	Fast	2:03.60
**1937**	**War Admiral †‡**	**Charley Kurtsinger**	**George Conway**	**Glen Riddle Farms**	**1 1/4**	**Fast**	**2:03.20**
1938	Lawrin	Eddie Arcaro	Ben Jones	Woolford Farm	1 1/4	Fast	2:04.80
1939	Johnstown †‡	James Stout	Jim Fitzsimmons	Belair Stud	1 1/4	Fast	2:03.40
1940	Gallahadion	Carroll Bierman	Roy Waldron	Milky Way Farm	1 1/4	Fast	2:05.00
**1941**	**Whirlaway ‡**	**Eddie Arcaro**	**Ben Jones**	**Calumet Farm**	**1 1/4**	**Fast**	**2:01.40**
1942	Shut Out	Wayne Wright	John Gaver Sr.	Greentree Stable	1 1/4	Fast	2:04.40
**1943**	**Count Fleet ‡**	Johnny Longden	Don Cameron	Fannie Hertz	1 1/4	Fast	2:04.00
1944	Pensive	Conn McCreary	Ben Jones	Calumet Farm	1 1/4	Good	2:04.20
1945	Hoop Jr.	Eddie Arcaro	Ivan Parke	Fred Hooper	1 1/4	Muddy	2:07.00
**1946**	**Assault †‡**	Warren Mehrtens	Max Hirsch	King Ranch	1 1/4	Slow	2:06.60
1947	Jet Pilot	Eric Guerin	Tom Smith	Maine Chance Farm	1 1/4	Slow	2:06.80
**1948**	**Citation †‡**	**Eddie Arcaro**	**Ben Jones**	**Calumet Farm**	**1 1/4**	**Sloppy**	**2:05.40**
1949	Ponder	Steve Brooks	Ben Jones	Calumet Farm	1 1/4	Fast	2:04.20
1950	Middleground	William Boland	Max Hirsch	King Ranch	1 1/4	Fast	2:01.60
1951	Count Turf	Conn McCreary	Sol Rutchick	Jack Amiel	1 1/4	Fast	2:02.60
1952	Hill Gail	Eddie Arcaro	Ben Jones	Calumet Farm	1 1/4	Fast	2:01.60
1953	Dark Star	Henry Moreno	Eddie Hayward	Cain Hoy Stable	1 1/4	Fast	2:02.00
1954	Determine	Raymond York	William Molter	Andy Crevolin	1 1/4	Fast	2:03.00
1955	Swaps †‡	Bill Shoemaker	Mesh Tenney	Rex Ellsworth	1 1/4	Fast	2:01.80
1956	Needles †‡	David Erb	Hugh Fontaine	D & H Stable	1 1/4	Fast	2:03.40
1957	Iron Liege	Bill Hartack	Jimmy Jones	Calumet Farm	1 1/4	Fast	2:02.20
1958	Tim Tam †‡	Ismael Valenzuela	Jimmy Jones	Calumet Farm	1 1/4	Muddy	2:05.00
1959	Tomy Lee	Bill Shoemaker	Frank Childs	Fred & Juliette Turner Jr.	1 1/4	Fast	2:02.20
1960	Venetian Way	Bill Hartack	Victor Sovinski	Sunny Blue Farm	1 1/4	Good	2:02.40
1961	Carry Back †‡	Johnny Sellers	Jack Price	Katherine Price	1 1/4	Good	2:04.00
1962	Decidedly	Bill Hartack	Horatio Luro	El Peco Ranch	1 1/4	Fast	2:00.40
1963	Chateaugay	Braulio Baeza	James P. Conway	Darby Dan Farm	1 1/4	Fast	2:01.80
1964	Northern Dancer †‡	Bill Hartack	Horatio Luro	Windfields Farm	1 1/4	Fast	2:00.00
1965	Lucky Debonair	Bill Shoemaker	Frank Catrone	Ada Rice	1 1/4	Fast	2:01.20
1966	Kauai King	Don Brumfield	Henry Forrest	Ford Stable	1 1/4	Fast	2:02.00
1967	Proud Clarion	Bobby Ussery	Loyd Gentry Jr.	Darby Dan Farm	1 1/4	Fast	2:00.60
1968	Forward Pass (Note: Dancer's Image, ridden by Bobby Ussery, trained by Lou Cavalaris Jr., and owned by Peter D. Fuller, finished first, but was disqualified after a post-race urine sample revealed traces of a banned drug in the horse. The drug in question – phenylbutazone – is now legal for use on racehorses in many states, including Kentucky.)	Ismael Valenzuela	Henry Forrest	Calumet Farm	1 1/4	Fast	2:02.20
1969	Majestic Prince †‡	Bill Hartack	Johnny Longden	Frank McMahon	1 1/4	Fast	2:01.80
1970	Dust Commander	Mike Manganello	Don Combs	Robert E. Lehmann	1 1/4	Good	2:03.40
1971	Canonero II	Gustavo Ávila	Juan Arias	Edgar Caibett	1 1/4	Fast	2:03.20
1972	Riva Ridge †‡	Ron Turcotte	Lucien Laurin	Meadow Stable	1 1/4	Fast	2:01.80
**1973**	**Secretariat †‡**	**Ron Turcotte**	**Lucien Laurin**	**Meadow Stable**	**1 1/4**	**Fast**	**1:59.40**
1974	Cannonade	Ángel Cordero Jr.	Woody Stephens	John Olin	1 1/4	Fast	2:04.00
1975	Foolish Pleasure †‡	Jacinto Vásquez	LeRoy Jolley	John Greer	1 1/4	Fast	2:02.00
1976	Bold Forbes	Ángel Cordero Jr.	Laz Barrera	E. Rodriguez Tizol	1 1/4	Fast	2:01.60
**1977**	**Seattle Slew †‡**	**Jean Cruguet**	**Billy Turner Jr.**	**Karen Taylor**	**1 1/4**	**Fast**	**2:02.20**
**1978**	**Affirmed †‡**	**Steve Cauthen**	**Laz Barrera**	**Harbor View Farm**	**1 1/4**	**Fast**	**2:01.20**
1979	Spectacular Bid †‡	Ronnie Franklin	Bud Delp	Hawksworth Farm	1 1/4	Fast	2:02.40
1980	Genuine Risk #‡	Jacinto Vásquez	LeRoy Jolley	Diana M. Firestone	1 1/4	Fast	2:02.00
1981	Pleasant Colony	Jorge Velásquez	John Campo	Buckland Farm	1 1/4	Fast	2:02.00
1982	Gato Del Sol	Eddie Delahoussaye	Edwin Gregson	Arthur B. Hancock III, Leone J. Peters	1 1/4	Fast	2:02.40
1983	Sunny's Halo	Eddie Delahoussaye	David Cross Jr.	D.J. Foster Racing Stable	1 1/4	Fast	2:02.20
1984	Swale	Laffit Pincay Jr.	Woody Stephens	Claiborne Farm	1 1/4	Fast	2:02.40
1985	Spend a Buck	Ángel Cordero Jr.	Cam Gambolati	Hunter Farm	1 1/4	Fast	2:00.20
1986	Ferdinand	Bill Shoemaker	Charlie Whittingham	Elizabeth Keck	1 1/4	Fast	2:02.80
1987	Alysheba †‡	Chris McCarron	Jack Van Berg	Dorothy & Pamela Scharbauer	1 1/4	Fast	2:03.40
1988	Winning Colors #‡	Gary Stevens	D. Wayne Lukas	Eugene Klein	1 1/4	Fast	2:02.20
1989	Sunday Silence †‡	Pat Valenzuela	Charlie Whittingham	H-G-W Partners	1 1/4	Muddy	2:05.00
1990	Unbridled	Craig Perret	Carl Nafzger	Frances A. Genter Stable	1 1/4	Good	2:02.00
1991	Strike the Gold	Chris Antley	Nick Zito	Bill Condren, Joe Cornacchia, B. Giles Brophy	1 1/4	Fast	2:03.00
1992	Lil E. Tee	Pat Day	Lynn Whiting	Cal Partee	1 1/4	Fast	2:03.04
1993	Sea Hero	Jerry Bailey	MacKenzie Miller	Rokeby Stables	1 1/4	Fast	2:02.40
1994	Go for Gin	Chris McCarron	Nick Zito	Bill Condren, Joe Cornacchia	1 1/4	Sloppy	2:03.60
1995	Thunder Gulch	Gary Stevens	D. Wayne Lukas	Michael Tabor	1 1/4	Fast	2:01.20
1996	Grindstone	Jerry Bailey	D. Wayne Lukas	Overbrook Farm	1 1/4	Fast	2:01.00
1997	Silver Charm ‡	Gary Stevens	Bob Baffert	Bob & Beverly Lewis	1 1/4	Fast	2:02.40
1998	Real Quiet	Kent Desormeaux	Bob Baffert	Michael E. Pegram	1 1/4	Fast	2:02.20
1999	Charismatic †	Chris Antley	D. Wayne Lukas	Bob & Beverly Lewis	1 1/4	Fast	2:03.20
2000	Fusaichi Pegasus	Kent Desormeaux	Neil Drysdale	Fusao Sekiguchi	1 1/4	Fast	2:01.00
2001	Monarchos	Jorge Chavez	John Ward Jr.	John Oxley	1 1/4	Fast	1:59.97
2002	War Emblem	Victor Espinoza	Bob Baffert	The Thoroughbred Corp.	1 1/4	Fast	2:01.13
2003	Funny Cide	José Santos	Barclay Tagg	Sackatoga Stable	1 1/4	Fast	2:01.19
2004	Smarty Jones	Stewart Elliott	John Servis	Someday Farm	1 1/4	Sloppy	2:04.06
2005	Giacomo	Mike Smith	John Shirreffs	Jerry & Ann Moss	1 1/4	Fast	2:02.75
2006	Barbaro	Edgar Prado	Michael Matz	Lael Stables	1 1/4	Fast	2:01.36
2007	Street Sense	Calvin Borel	Carl Nafzger	Jim Tafel	1 1/4	Fast	2:02.17
2008	Big Brown	Kent Desormeaux	Rick Dutrow Jr.	IEAH Stables, Paul Pompa Jr.	1 1/4	Fast	2:01.82
2009	Mine That Bird	Calvin Borel	Bennie Woolley Jr.	Double Eagle Ranch, Buena Suerte Equine	1 1/4	Sloppy	2:02.66
2010	Super Saver	Calvin Borel	Todd Pletcher	WinStar Farm	1 1/4	Sloppy	2:04.45
2011	Animal Kingdom	John Velazquez	Graham Motion	Team Valor International	1 1/4	Fast	2:02.04
2012	I'll Have Another	Mario Gutierrez	Doug O'Neill	Reddam Racing	1 1/4	Fast	2:01.83
2013	Orb	Joel Rosario	Claude McGaughey III	Stuart S. Janney III, Phipps Stable	1 1/4	Sloppy	2:02.89
2014	California Chrome †‡	Victor Espinoza	Art Sherman	Steve Coburn & Perry Martin	1 1/4	Fast	2:03.66
**2015**	**American Pharoah †‡**	**Victor Espinoza**	**Bob Baffert**	**Zayat Stables**	**1 1/4**	**Fast**	**2:03.02**
2016	Nyquist	Mario Gutierrez	Doug O'Neill	Reddam Racing	1 1/4	Fast	2:01.31
2017	Always Dreaming	John Velazquez	Todd Pletcher	MeB Racing, Brooklyn Boyz, Teresa Viola, St. Elias, Siena Farm, West Point Thoroughbreds	1 1/4	Wet Fast (sealed)	2:03.59
**2018**	**Justify †‡**	**Mike Smith**	**Bob Baffert**	**China Horse Club, Head of Plains Partners, Starlight Racing, WinStar Farm**	**1 1/4**	**Sloppy**	**2:04.20**
2019	Country House (Note: Maximum Security crossed the finish line first, but was disqualified for interference.)	Flavien Prat	William I. Mott	Mrs. J.V. Shields Jr., E. J. M. McFadden Jr., LNJ Foxwoods	1 1/4	Sloppy	2:03.93
2020	Authentic †	John Velazquez	Bob Baffert	Spendthrift Farm, MyRaceHorse Stable, Madaket Stables, Starlight Racing	1 1/4	Fast	2:00.61
2021	Mandaloun (Note: Medina Spirit crossed the finish line first, but was disqualified due to a positive test for betamethasone.)	Florent Geroux	Brad Cox	Juddmonte	1 1/4	Fast	2:01.02
2022	Rich Strike	Sonny Leon	Eric Reed	RED TR-Racing	1 1/4	Fast	2:02.61
2023	Mage	Javier Castellano	Gustavo Delgado	OGMA Investments, Ramiro Restrepo, Sterling Racing, CMNWLTH	1 1/4	Fast	2:01.57
2024	Mystik Dan	Brian Hernandez Jr.	Kenneth G. McPeek	Lance Gasaway, 4 G Racing (Brent Gasaway), Daniel Hamby III, Valley View Farm	1 1/4	Fast	2:03.34
2025	Sovereignty †	Junior Alvarado	William I. Mott	Godolphin	1 1/4	Sloppy	2:02.31
2026	Golden Tempo	José Ortiz	Cherie DeVaux	Phipps Stable, St. Elias Stable	1 1/4	Fast	2:02.27

Notes

# Designates a filly.

† Designates a horse that won American Horse of the Year in the same year they won the Derby.

‡ Designates a horse that was inducted in subsequent years into the National Racing Hall of Fame.

== Sire lines ==
Winners of the Kentucky Derby can be connected to each other due to the practice of arranging horse breeding based on their previous success. All of the horses can be traced back to the three foundational sires, with Godolphin Arabian the ancestor of 7 winners, Byerley Turk the ancestor of 11 winners, and Darley Arabian the ancestor of 134 winners, including all winners since 1938.

The Curlin direct sire line has produced 3 of the last 5 Kentucky Derby winners, most recently Golden Tempo in 2026.

The Into Mischief direct sire line has produced 4 of the last 7 Kentucky Derby winners, most recently Sovereignty in 2025.

=== Darley Arabian line ===
The Darley Arabian (1700c) sire line (all branched through the Eclipse (1764) line) produced 134 Derby winners (126 colts, 5 geldings, 3 fillies), including all winners from 1938 to present. The main branches of this sire line are:

- the King Fergus (1775) branch (all branched through the Voltigeur (1847) line), produced 14 winners. His sire line continued primarily through his son Vedette (1854) with 12 winners, due to his sons Speculum (1865) with 6 winners (nearly exclusively through Sundridge (1898) with 5 winners, most recently Count Turf in 1951) and Galopin (1872) with 6 winners (exclusively through St. Simon (1881), most recently Go for Gin in 1994).
- the Potoooooooo (1773) branch produced 120 winners (all branched through the Waxy (1790) line), including all winners from 1995 to present. The primary branch of this sire line is through Whalebone (1807), which has produced 115 winners. In turn, the primary branch continues through Sir Hercules (1826), which has produced 93 winners (including all winners since 2006), and then the Birdcatcher (1833) branch which produced 81 winners. From Birdcatcher, the branch of The Baron (1842) has produced 71 winners, of which 69 winners trace to Stockwell (1849). Stockwell's son Doncaster (1870) sired Bend Or (1877), whose sire line accounts for 67 winners. The main branch of the Bend Or sire line continued through his son Bona Vista (1889) with 58 winners, exclusively through the Phalaris (1913) line, which has dominated in the last several decades (including all winners from 2006 to present) through the following sons:
  - the Pharamond (1925) branch (4 winners all through the Tom Fool (1949) line, most recently Silver Charm in 1997).
  - the Sickle (1924) branch, (25 winners all branched through the Native Dancer (1950) line, nearly exclusively through Raise a Native (1961) with 24 winners, continued primarily through Mr Prospector (1970) with 17 winners through 8 different sons: Fusaichi Pegasus, winner of the 2000 Kentucky Derby, and 7 other sons through their progeny (most recently Golden Tempo in 2026, with his son Fappiano (1977) accounting for 6 winners, nearly exclusively through his son Unbridled with 5 winners, including his win in the 1990 Kentucky Derby and 4 other winners (most recently Always Dreaming in 2017)).
  - the Pharos (1920) branch (29 winners all branched through the Nearco (1935) line, through his sons Royal Charger (1942), Nearctic (1954), and Nasrullah (1940)), which includes all winners from 2024 to present. The Royal Charger branch (exclusively through his son Turn-To (1951)) produced 5 winners (most recently Barbaro in 2006), the Nearctic branch produced 10 winners (including all winners from 2024 to present), exclusively through his son Northern Dancer (1961) with his win in the 1964 Kentucky Derby, and direct male progeny of 9 winners, including 6 winners through his son Storm Bird (nearly exclusively through his son Storm Cat with 5 winners (including all winners from 2024 to present), most recently Sovereignty in 2025), while the Nasrullah branch produced 14 winners (most recently Nyquist in 2016) primarily through his son Bold Ruler (1954) with 10 winners (most recently California Chrome in 2014).
  - special notes:
    - the Waxy (1790) branch produced two main lines: the primary branch of Whalebone (1807), and the secondary branch of Whisker (1812) which produced 5 winners (exclusively through the King Tom (1851) line), most recently 1909 Kentucky Derby winner Wintergreen.
    - the Whalebone (1807) branch produced two main lines, the primary branch of Sir Hercules (1826), and the secondary branch of Camel (1822) (18 winners exclusively through the Touchstone (1831) line), including 2005 Kentucky Derby winner Giacomo through his grandson Orlando's (1841) branch. Since then, each winner of the Kentucky Derby has gone through Whalebone's more frequent sire line branch of Sir Herecules (1826). The Orlando branch (6 winners exclusively through the Himyar (1875) line) is the less common of the two branches derived through Camel. Orlando's brother Newminster (1848) produced 12 winners (primarily through the Hyperion (1930) line with 8 winners), most recently Chateaugay in 1963.
    - the Sir Hercules (1826) branch produced two main lines: the primary branch of Birdcatcher (1833), and the secondary branch of Faugh-a-Ballagh (1841) which produced 12 winners (exclusively through the Leamington (1853) line), most recently 1908 Kentucky Derby winner Stone Street.
    - the Birdcatcher (1833) branch produced two main lines: the primary branch of The Baron (1842), and the secondary branch of Oxford (1857) which produced 10 winners (primarily through the Swynford (1907) line with 8 winners, with his son St. Germans producing 5 winners), most recently 1965 Kentucky Derby winner Lucky Debonair.
    - the Bend Or (1877) branch produced two main lines: the primary branch of Bona Vista (1889), and the secondary branch of Ormonde (1883) which produced 8 winners (exclusively through the Teddy (1913) line, with his son Sir Gallahad producing 5 winners, most recently Hoop Jr. in 1945), most recently 1957 Kentucky Derby winner Iron Liege.

=== Byerley Turk line ===
The Byerley Turk (1680c) sire line produced 11 winners (8 colts, 3 geldings). The main branches of this sire (all branched through the Herod (1758) line) are:

- the Highflyer (1774) branch produced 1 winner, most recently Macbeth II in 1888.
- the Florizel (1768) branch produced 3 winners (all branched through the Lexington (1850) line), most recently Manuel in 1899.
- the Woodpecker (1773) branch produced 7 winners (all branched through the Buzzard (1787) line). The main branches of this sire line are:
  - the Castrel (1801) branch produced 1 winner, most recently Kingman in 1891.
  - the Selim (1802) branch produced 6 winners (all branched through the Glencoe (1831) line). The main branches of this sire line are:
    - the Star Davis (1849) branch produced 1 winner, most recently Day Star in 1878.
    - the Vandal (1850) branch produced 5 winners (all branched through the Virgil (1864) line), most recently Alan-a-Dale in 1902.

=== Godolphin Arabian line ===
The Godolphin Arabian (1724c) sire line produced 7 winners (6 colts, 1 gelding). The main branches of this sire (all branched through the West Australian (1850) line) are:

- the Solon (1861) branch produced 3 winners, including:
  - the Barcaldine (1878) branch produced 1 winner, most recently Omar Khayyam in 1917
  - the Arbitrator (1874) branch produced 2 winners (all branched through The Finn (1912) line), most recently Flying Ebony in 1925
- the Australian (1858) branch produced 4 winners, including:
  - Baden-Baden (1874), winner of the 1877 Kentucky Derby
  - the Waverly (1870) branch produced 1 winner, most recently Montrose in 1887
  - the Spendthrift (1876) branch produced 2 winners (all branched through the Man o' War (1917) line), most recently War Admiral in 1937

=== Kentucky Derby winners with male-line descendants including other Kentucky Derby winners ===
- Northern Dancer (1964 winner) – 9 colts; most recently Sovereignty (2025)
- Ben Brush (1896 winner) – 3 winners (2 colts, 1 filly); most recently Whiskery (1927)
- Seattle Slew (1977 winner) – 3 colts; most recently California Chrome (2014)
- Unbridled (1990 winner) – 3 winners (2 colts, 1 gelding); most recently American Pharoah (2015)
- Hindoo (1881 winner) – 2 colts; most recently Alan-a-Dale (1902)
- Bold Venture (1936 winner) – 2 colts; most recently Middleground (1950)
- Reigh Count (1928 winner) – 2 colts; most recently Count Turf (1951)
- Pensive (1944 winner) – 2 colts; most recently Needles (1956)
- Majestic Prince (1969 winner) – 2 colts; most recently Super Saver (2010)
- Halma (1895 winner) – 1 colt; Alan-a-Dale (1902)
- Leonatus (1883 winner) – 1 colt; Pink Star (1907)
- Bubbling Over (1926 winner) – 1 colt; Burgoo King (1932)
- Gallant Fox (1930 winner) – 1 colt; Omaha (1935)
- Count Fleet (1943 winner) – 1 colt; Count Turf (1951)
- Ponder (1949 winner) – 1 colt; Needles (1956)
- Determine (1954 winner) – 1 colt; Decidedly (1962)
- Swaps (1955 winner) – 1 colt; Chateaugay (1963)
- Grindstone (1996 winner) – 1 gelding; Mine That Bird (2009)

== See also ==
- American thoroughbred racing top attended events
- Grand Slam of Thoroughbred racing
- "The Kentucky Derby Is Decadent and Depraved", by Hunter S. Thompson
- Kentucky Derby top four finishers
- List of attractions and events in the Louisville metropolitan area
- List of graded stakes at Churchill Downs
- List of Kentucky Derby broadcasters
- Triple Crown Productions
