= Middleground =

American-bred Thoroughbred racehorse

- Sire: Bold Venture
- Grandsire: St. Germans
- Dam: Verguenza
- Damsire: Chicaro
- Sex: Stallion
- Foaled: 1947
- Country: United States
- Colour: Chestnut
- Breeder: King Ranch
- Owner: King Ranch
- Trainer: Max Hirsch
- Record: 15: 6-6-2
- Earnings: $237,725

Major wins
- Hopeful Stakes (1949); Kentucky Derby (1950); Belmont Stakes (1950)

Awards
- U.S. Champion 3-Yr-Old Colt (1951); United States Horse of the Year (1951)

Middleground (April 22, 1947 – February 16, 1972) was an American Thoroughbred racehorse who won the 1950 Kentucky Derby and Belmont Stakes and came second in the Preakness Stakes. He was named the 1950 American Horse of the Year and Champion Three-Year-Old Male.

== Racing career ==
Bred by Robert J. Kleberg III, Middleground was ridden throughout his career by 16-year-old apprentice jockey Bill Boland, and he was trained by Max Hirsch, both future U.S. Hall of Fame inductees.

As a two-year-old in 1949, Middleground won the Hopeful Stakes and came third in the Arlington Futurity.

The following year, Middleground started the year with second-place finishes both the Withers Stakes and Wood Memorial.

He then won the Kentucky Derby, only the second horse to win it with an apprentice jockey after his sire Bold Venture who won with jockey Ira Hanford. Five time Kentucky Derby winning jockey Eddie Arcaro had the chance to ride Middleground, but he chose to ride Hill Prince instead, who finished second.

After the Kentucky Derby, Middleground finished second to Hill Prince after a rough trip in the Preakness Stakes, and won the Belmont Stakes.

As a three-year-old he also won the Leonard Richards Stakes.

In the 1950 Jerome Handicap, Middleground broke a bone in his foot and was retired.

== Retirement and stud career ==
Middleground was retired to stud at King Ranch in 1951. He sired 101 winners and 7 stakes winners in his stud career, including Resaca, Chistosa, and Here and There.

He died in 1972, and the gravesite is on the King Ranch, in Kingsville, Texas.

In 2000, he was inducted into the Texas Horse Racing Hall of Fame.

== Pedigree ==
Pedigree of Middleground (USA), chestnut stallion, 1947
Sire Bold Venture (USA) 1933	St Germans (GB); 1921	Swynford	John O'Gaunt
Sire Bold Venture (USA) 1933	St Germans (GB); 1921	Swynford	Canterbury Pilgrim
Sire Bold Venture (USA) 1933	St Germans (GB); 1921	Hamoaze	Torpoint
Sire Bold Venture (USA) 1933	St Germans (GB); 1921	Hamoaze	Maid of the Mist
Sire Bold Venture (USA) 1933	Possible (USA); 1920	Ultimus	Commando*
Sire Bold Venture (USA) 1933	Possible (USA); 1920	Ultimus	Running Stream
Sire Bold Venture (USA) 1933	Possible (USA); 1920	Lida Flush	Royal Flush
Sire Bold Venture (USA) 1933	Possible (USA); 1920	Lida Flush	Lida H
Dam Verguena (USA) 1940	Chicaro (USA); 1923	Chicle	Spearmint
Dam Verguena (USA) 1940	Chicaro (USA); 1923	Chicle	Lady Hamburg
Dam Verguena (USA) 1940	Chicaro (USA); 1923	Wendy	Peter Pan*
Dam Verguena (USA) 1940	Chicaro (USA); 1923	Wendy	Remembrance
Dam Verguena (USA) 1940	Blushing Sister (USA); 1932	Bubbling Over	North Star
Dam Verguena (USA) 1940	Blushing Sister (USA); 1932	Bubbling Over	Beaming Beauty
Dam Verguena (USA) 1940	Blushing Sister (USA); 1932	Lace	Bunting
Dam Verguena (USA) 1940	Blushing Sister (USA); 1932	Lace	Stickling (Family: 4-m)

* Middleground is inbred 4S x 5D to the stallion Commando, meaning that he appears fourth generation on the sire side of his pedigree, and fifth generation (via Peter Pan) on the dam side of his pedigree.
