= Old Rosebud =

American-bred Thoroughbred racehorse

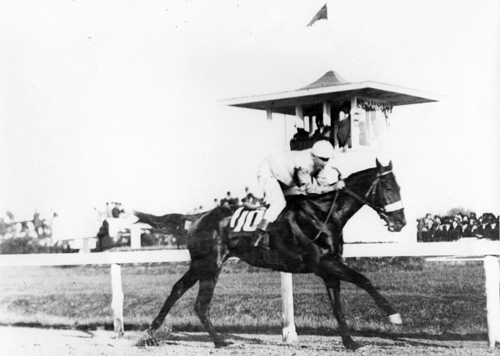
- Old Rosebud winning the 1914 Kentucky Derby
- Sire: Uncle
- Grandsire: Star Shoot
- Dam: Ivory Bells
- Damsire: Himyar
- Sex: Gelding
- Foaled: 1911
- Country: United States
- Colour: Bay
- Breeder: John E. Madden
- Owner: Frank D. Weir & Hamilton Applegate
- Trainer: Frank D. Weir
- Record: 80:40-13-8
- Earnings: $74,729

Major wins
- Flash Stakes (1913); Harold Stakes (1913); United States Hotel Stakes (1913); Clark Handicap (1917); Queens County Handicap (1917); Delaware Handicap (1917); Carter Handicap (1917); Red Cross Handicap (1917) American Classics wins: Kentucky Derby (1914)

Awards
- Unofficial American Champion Two-Year-Old Colt (1913); Unofficial U.S. Champion Handicap Horse (1917)

Honours
- United States Racing Hall of Fame (1968) #88 - Top 100 U.S. Racehorses of the 20th Century
- Last updated on September 21, 2006

Old Rosebud (March 13, 1911 – May 23, 1922) was an American Thoroughbred racehorse whose pedigree traced to the influential sire Eclipse, and through Eclipse to the founding stallion, the Darley Arabian. In the list of the top 100 U.S. thoroughbred champions of the 20th Century by Blood-Horse magazine, Old Rosebud ranks 88th. Despite a successful racing career, Old Rosebud was plagued by ailments throughout his life, culminating in a fatal injury at a claiming race when he was 11 years old.

== Pedigree and 2-year-old racing career ==
Bred by John E. Madden, the bay colt (soon to be gelded) was from the stallion Uncle's first crop of foals. Born in Kentucky, he was purchased as a yearling for $500 by the trainer Frank D. Weir. Weir sold a majority interest in the gelding to Hamilton C. Applegate, the treasurer of Churchill Downs. Frank Weir said of the gelding, "Old Rosebud was the kind of horse one sees once in a lifetime. He certainly was the fastest horse I ever trained or saw. If he had been sound, there's no telling how fast he would have run."

Old Rosebud was determined to be the historical two-year-old champion of 1913 and was the top earner for the year. At two, Old Rosebud's most important victories included the Flash Stakes and the United States Hotel Stakes. Before his first injury took him out of training, he set four track records.

== Kentucky Derby and later career ==
Old Rosebud came back in his third year to take the 1914 Kentucky Derby by eight lengths in a time of 2:03 2/5, setting a time record that would not be broken for 16 years and a margin record that has been tied but never broken. In the Derby, he had begun the race as the favorite because of his previous record.

Three weeks after the Derby, Old Rosebud sustained a bowed tendon during the May 1914 running of the Withers Stakes at Belmont Park. The race was run clockwise around the track instead of the more customary, in the U.S., counter-clockwise direction. Running the wrong way confused Old Rosebud, who did not change leads coming into the stretch. He was taken out of competition for two seasons as a result of the injury.

At age 6, after nearly three years on the prairies of Texas, Old Rosebud won the Queen's County, the Carter Handicap, the Red Cross, and the Delaware Handicap. These victories also led to his being named historical Champion Handicap Male of 1917. An injury took him out of competition for another year and a half.

Old Rosebud returned to racing at the age of 8. Overall, he won the Yucatán Stakes, the Spring Trial Stakes, the Harold Stakes, the Cincinnati Trophy Stakes, the Flash Stakes, the United States Hotel Stakes, and the Kentucky Derby.

He went on to win the Clark Handicap, the Latonia Inaugural Handicap, the Queens County Handicap, the Carter Handicap (again), the Frontier Handicap, the Delaware Handicap, the Bayview Handicap, the Mt. Vernon Cap, the Sir Archy Highweight Cap, and the Latonia Grand Hotel Purse. He came in second in the Idle Hour Stakes, the Bashford Manor Stakes, the Paumonok Handicap, the Mount Vernon Handicap (losing to the four-years-younger August Belmont Jr.'s Lucullite, but beating Sun Briar, Exterminator's stablemate), and the Burnett Woods Cap (to the five-years-younger stakes-winning Sennings Park). He was third in the Brooklyn Handicap, the Thanksgiving Handicap, and the Eden Park Cap.

Old Rosebud competed for a total of 10 years before suffering his final injury in a claiming race at Jamaica Racetrack. He had to be euthanized. Out of 80 starts, Old Rosebud won 40, placed in 13, and showed in 8. His career earnings were $74,729.

== Honors ==
In 1968, Old Rosebud was elected to the National Museum of Racing and Hall of Fame.

== Pedigree ==
Pedigree of Old Rosebud
Sire Uncle 1905	Star Shoot 1898	Isinglass	Isonomy
Sire Uncle 1905	Star Shoot 1898	Isinglass	Dead Lock
Sire Uncle 1905	Star Shoot 1898	Astrology	Hermit*
Sire Uncle 1905	Star Shoot 1898	Astrology	Stella
Sire Uncle 1905	The Niece 1882	Alarm*	Eclipse*
Sire Uncle 1905	The Niece 1882	Alarm*	Maud*
Sire Uncle 1905	The Niece 1882	Jaconet	Leamington
Sire Uncle 1905	The Niece 1882	Jaconet	Maggie B B
Dam Ivory Bells 1899	Himyar 1875	Alarm*	Eclipse*
Dam Ivory Bells 1899	Himyar 1875	Alarm*	Maud*
Dam Ivory Bells 1899	Himyar 1875	Hira	Lexington
Dam Ivory Bells 1899	Himyar 1875	Hira	Hegira
Dam Ivory Bells 1899	Ida Pickwick 1888	Mr Pickwick	Hermit*
Dam Ivory Bells 1899	Ida Pickwick 1888	Mr Pickwick	Tomato
Dam Ivory Bells 1899	Ida Pickwick 1888	Ida K	King Alfonso
Dam Ivory Bells 1899	Ida Pickwick 1888	Ida K	Lerna (Family 6-a)

* Old Rosebud is inbred 3S x 3D to the stallion Alarm, meaning that he appears third generation on the sire side of his pedigree, and third generation on the dam side of his pedigree.

* Old Rosebud is inbred 4S x 4D to the stallion Hermit, meaning that he appears fourth generation on the sire side of his pedigree, and fourth generation on the dam side of his pedigree.
