= Sir Barton =

American-bred Thoroughbred racehorse

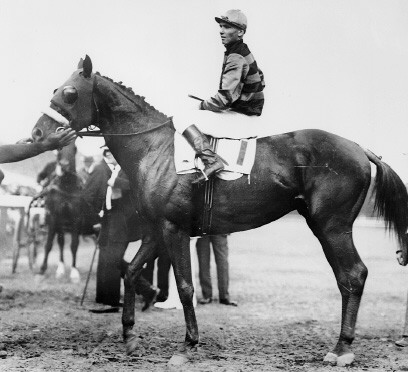
- Sir Barton & jockey Johnny Loftus, 1919
- Sire: Star Shoot
- Grandsire: Isinglass
- Dam: Lady Sterling
- Damsire: Hanover
- Sex: Stallion
- Foaled: 1916
- Country: United States
- Color: Chestnut
- Breeder: John E. Madden
- Owner: John E. Madden; J. K. L. Ross
- Trainer: Billy Walker; H. Guy Bedwell
- Record: 31: 13–6–5
- Earnings: $116,857

Major wins
- Potomac Handicap (1919); Withers Stakes (1919); Climax Handicap (1920); Maryland Handicap (1919); Saratoga Handicap (1920); Dominion Handicap (1920); Merchants and Citizens Handicap (1920); Rennert Handicap (1920) Triple Crown race wins: Kentucky Derby (1919); Preakness Stakes (1919); Belmont Stakes (1919)

Awards
- 1st US Triple Crown Champion (1919); United States Champion 3-Yr-Old Colt (1919); United States Horse of the Year (1919)

Honors
- US Racing Hall of Fame (1957); Canadian Horse Racing Hall of Fame (1976) #49 – Top 100 US Racehorses of the 20th Century; Sir Barton Stakes at Woodbine Racetrack; Sir Barton Way in Lexington, Kentucky

Sir Barton (April 26, 1916 – October 30, 1937) was a champion American Thoroughbred racehorse who is the first winner of the American Triple Crown.

== Background ==
Sir Barton was a chestnut colt bred in 1916, in Kentucky, by John E. Madden at Hamburg Place Farm near Lexington. An Englishman, Vivian A. Gooch, who judged the 1918 National Horse, was co-listed as breeder with Madden, but Gooch had actually served as the agent who purchased Sir Martin, Sir Barton's half-brother, from Madden for Louis Winans. As a favor to Gooch, Madden listed his friend as co-breeder and then Madden purchased Gooch's gifted share of Sir Barton when Madden decided to keep the colt and race him under his own colors.

Sir Barton was sired by the British stallion Star Shoot out of the mare Lady Sterling, by Hanover. Sir Barton's paternal grandsire was the 1893 English Triple Crown winner Isinglass. His half-brother was 1908 juvenile champion Sir Martin.

Sir Barton was known for being a "grouchy" horse, and it was said that the only human he didn't hate was his groom, Toots Thompson.

== Racing career ==
=== Early career ===
Trained by African American former jockey Billy Walker, Sir Barton raced as part of John E. Madden's stable in the first four starts of his two-year-old season, but none of those starts demonstrated the same speed and talent the colt would show in his workouts. In late August 1918, Madden sold the horse for a reported $10,000 to Canadian businessman and volunteer naval commander J. K. L. Ross. After some early success, Ross was growing his stable as part of his effort to commit more fully to racing. He owned farms in Vercheres, Quebec, where he established a breeding operation for his Canadian horses; and, in 1919, purchased Bolingbrook near Laurel, Maryland, for training and breeding his American stock.

Ross placed Sir Barton in the hands of trainer H. Guy Bedwell. The colt made two more starts that year, finishing second in his last start, the 1918 Belmont Futurity. He contracted blood poisoning after a stablemate kicked him, opening a significant cut on his left hind leg. Bedwell personally nursed him through the illness, which sidelined Sir Barton for the rest of the year.

=== 1919: Triple Crown sweep ===
At three, Sir Barton won his season debut as a maiden in the Kentucky Derby on May 10, 1919, ridden by jockey Johnny Loftus. Legend holds that he was supposed to be the rabbit (pacemaker) for his highly regarded stablemate, the gelding Billy Kelly, but that assumption is only partially true; in reality Sir Barton was regarded at having a better chance of winning the Kentucky Derby than Billy Kelly, owing to both his weight allowance as a maiden as well as the fitness he had demonstrated in the preparations for the Derby. Sir Barton led the field of 12 horses from start to finish, winning the race by five lengths. The next day, Sir Barton was shipped to Baltimore to run in the Preakness Stakes, held only three days later on May 14. In the Preakness, he again led all the way, winning wire-to-wire and beating Eternal by four lengths. He then won the Withers Stakes in New York on May 24 and shortly thereafter completed the first Triple Crown in U.S. history by winning the Belmont Stakes on June 11, setting an American record for the mile and three-eighths race, the distance for the Belmont at the time. Sir Barton's four wins were accomplished in a space of just 32 days. He has been retroactively honored as the 1919 Horse of the Year.

=== 1919: Later three-year-old season ===
After his win in the Belmont, Sir Barton's next start was the Dwyer Stakes, where he faced Purchase, another highly rated three-year-old trained and owned by Sam Hildreth. On a muddy track, Purchase caught Sir Barton in the final furlong and Sir Barton finished second. After the Dwyer, Sir Barton got a bruised hoof and only returned in mid-September. He did stellar performances in races such as the Maryland Handicap while also turning in a couple of puzzling losses, including the Autumn Handicap. He finished the year with $88,250, finishing just ahead of Man o' War in money won that year.

=== 1920: Four-year-old season ===
As a four-year-old, Sir Barton won five of his 12 races. On April 24, Sir Barton won the six-furlong Climax Handicap at Havre de Grace Racetrack, defeating stablemate Milkmaid and five other runners. In the Saratoga Handicap, he beat Exterminator. While carrying 133 pounds, Sir Barton set a world record for 1 3/16 miles on dirt in winning the August 28 Merchants and Citizens Handicap. His match race on October 12 that year against Man o' War at Kenilworth Park in Windsor, Ontario, Canada is most remembered. Sir Barton, who suffered from hoof problems throughout his career, was unsuited for Kenilworth's hard surface, and was beaten by seven lengths.

== Retirement and stud career ==
In early 1921, controversy over H. G. Bedwell's support of disgraced jockey Cal Shilling forced Ross to fire Bedwell and to hire Henry McDaniel, a future US Racing Hall of Fame inductee known for training Exterminator as a three-year-old. McDaniel attempted to prepare Sir Barton to race as a five-year-old, but worried that continued training would cause the Triple Crown winner to break down. Ross retired Sir Barton to stud that year and in August 1921 sold the champion to Montfort and B.B. Jones, who brought the chestnut son of Star Shoot to their Audley Farm in Berryville, Virginia, where he remained until 1932. In December 2008, a statue of Sir Barton was unveiled in front of Audley Farm's stallion barn. The statue, by American sculptor Jan Woods, was a gift from Erich von Baumbach Jr., whose family has had an association with the farm for thirty years.

Despite a lackluster stud career, Sir Barton sired the 1928 Kentucky Oaks winner and 1928 Champion Three Year Old Filly, Easter Stockings. He also sired Fort Thomas Handicap winner Nellie Custis. After Montfort Jones' death in 1927, B. B. Jones slowly exited the Thoroughbred racing industry; in 1932, Sir Barton became part of the U.S. Army Remount Service, first at Front Royal, Virginia, and then, later that year, in Fort Robinson, Nebraska. Thoroughbred breeder and rancher J. R. Hylton received Sir Barton from the Remount Service and brought him to his ranch outside of Douglas, Wyoming.

Sir Barton died of colic on October 30, 1937, and was buried on Hylton's ranch in the foothills of the Laramie Mountains. In 1968 his remains were moved to Washington Park in Douglas, Wyoming, where a memorial was erected to honor America's first Triple Crown winner. Gordon Turner raised money for and orchestrated the move.

== Honors and awards ==
Sir Barton was officially recognized as the first Triple Crown winner in 1950 when the title was formally proclaimed by the Thoroughbred Racing Associations and retroactively awarded to horses who had completed the feat in prior years.

Sir Barton and Star Shoot both have streets named in their honor in Lexington, Kentucky, in the Hamburg Pavilion shopping center area. Sir Barton Way runs from Winchester Road to Man O' War Boulevard; Star Shoot Parkway runs from the shopping center across Sir Barton Way to Liberty Road.

Sir Barton was inducted into the National Museum of Racing and Hall of Fame in 1957. In the Blood-Horse magazine ranking of the top 100 U.S. thoroughbred champions of the 20th Century, he is no. 49.

In 2019, the 100th anniversary of Sir Barton's Triple Crown win, the book Sir Barton and the Making of the Triple Crown was published by the University Press of Kentucky. The book covers Sir Barton's life and career in detail.

In 2020, as part of a fundraiser for emergency relief efforts due to the COVID-19 pandemic, a "virtual Kentucky Derby" was held wherein the field included the 13 Triple Crown winners. Sir Barton finished last.

== Breeding ==
Pedigree of Sir Barton
Sire Star Shoot	Isinglass	Isonomy	Sterling*
Sire Star Shoot	Isinglass	Isonomy	Isola Bella
Sire Star Shoot	Isinglass	Deadlock	Wenlock
Sire Star Shoot	Isinglass	Deadlock	Malpractice
Sire Star Shoot	Astrology	Hermit	Newminster
Sire Star Shoot	Astrology	Hermit	Seclusion
Sire Star Shoot	Astrology	Stella	Brother To Strafford
Sire Star Shoot	Astrology	Stella	Toxophilite Mare
Dam Lady Sterling	Hanover	Hindoo	Virgil
Dam Lady Sterling	Hanover	Hindoo	Florence
Dam Lady Sterling	Hanover	Bourbon Belle	Bonnie Scotland
Dam Lady Sterling	Hanover	Bourbon Belle	Ella D
Dam Lady Sterling	Aquila	Sterling*	Oxford*
Dam Lady Sterling	Aquila	Sterling*	Whisper*
Dam Lady Sterling	Aquila	Eagle	Phoenix
Dam Lady Sterling	Aquila	Eagle	Au Revoir

* Sir Barton is inbred 4S x 3D to the stallion Sterling, meaning that he appears fourth generation on the sire side of his pedigree, and third generation on the dam side of his pedigree.
