= Alan-a-Dale (horse) =

American-bred Thoroughbred racehorse

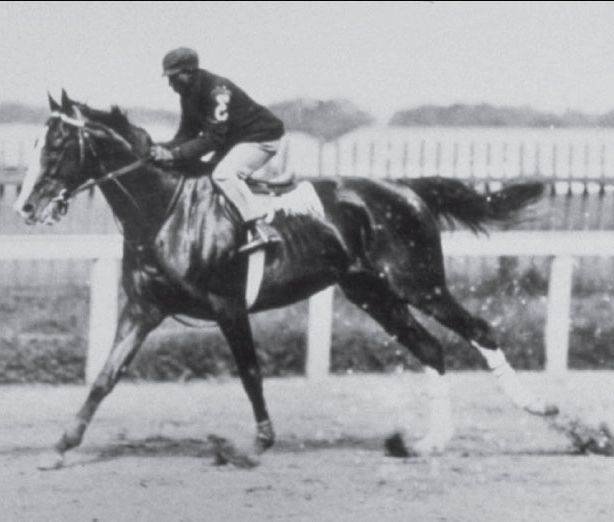
- Jimmy Winkfield aboard Alan-a-Dale, 1902
- Sire: Halma
- Grandsire: Hanover
- Dam: Sudie McNairy
- Damsire: Enquirer
- Sex: Stallion
- Foaled: 1899
- Country: United States
- Colour: Chestnut
- Breeder: Thomas Clay McDowell
- Owner: Thomas Clay McDowell
- Trainer: Thomas Clay McDowell
- Record: 37: 17-7-1
- Earnings: $25,195.00

Major wins
- Brighton Junior Stakes (1901); Oakwood Handicap (1903); American Classics wins: Kentucky Derby (1902)
- Last updated on April 12, 2010

Alan-a-Dale (1899–1925) was an American Thoroughbred racehorse best known for winning the 1902 Kentucky Derby. He was named for a figure in the Robin Hood legend. According to the stories, he was a wandering minstrel who became a member of Robin's band of outlaws, the "Merry Men." He was bred by Thomas McDowell at his Ashland Stud in Lexington, Kentucky. He was the son of the 1895 Kentucky Derby winner Halma. Raced and trained by McDowell, at age two Alan-a-Dale won three of his four starts but the following year health problems kept him out of racing until Kentucky Derby time. Ridden by future Hall of Fame jockey Jimmy Winkfield, the official Kentucky Derby website says that Alan-a-Dale had a lead of six lengths and despite going lame down the stretch, "carried on with flawless courage to win by a nose." This injury kept Alan-a-Dale out of racing for the rest of the year.

At age four, Alan-a-Dale returned to the track and raced successfully for three more years, retiring with seventeen wins from his thirty-seven lifetime starts. At stud, he met with limited success and died in 1925 at age twenty-six.

== Pedigree ==
Pedigree of Alan-a-Dale
Sire Halma 1892	Hanover 1884	Hindoo	Virgil
Sire Halma 1892	Hanover 1884	Hindoo	Florence
Sire Halma 1892	Hanover 1884	Bourbon Belle	Bonnie Scotland
Sire Halma 1892	Hanover 1884	Bourbon Belle	Ella D
Sire Halma 1892	Julia L 1885	Longfellow	Leamington
Sire Halma 1892	Julia L 1885	Longfellow	Nantura
Sire Halma 1892	Julia L 1885	Christine	Australian
Sire Halma 1892	Julia L 1885	Christine	La Grande Duchesse
Dam Sudie McNairy 1880	Enquirer 1867	Leamington	Faugh-a-Ballagh
Dam Sudie McNairy 1880	Enquirer 1867	Leamington	Pantaloon Mare
Dam Sudie McNairy 1880	Enquirer 1867	Lida	Lexington
Dam Sudie McNairy 1880	Enquirer 1867	Lida	Lize
Dam Sudie McNairy 1880	Nannie McNairy 1863	Jeff Davis	Hero
Dam Sudie McNairy 1880	Nannie McNairy 1863	Jeff Davis	Marigold
Dam Sudie McNairy 1880	Nannie McNairy 1863	Elizabeth McNairy	Ambassador
Dam Sudie McNairy 1880	Nannie McNairy 1863	Elizabeth McNairy	Princess Ann
