= Thomas Clay McDowell =

American businessman and racehorse owner

Thomas McDowell
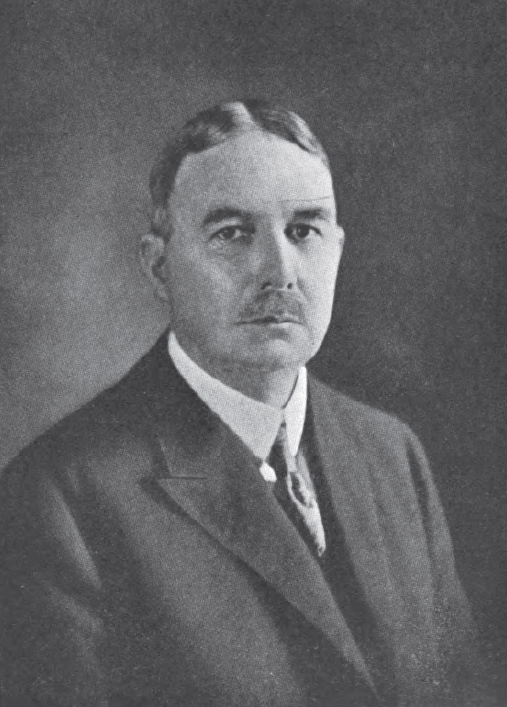

Personal information
- Born: 9 March 1866 Lexington, Kentucky, United States
- Died: 9 February 1935 (aged 68)
- Occupation(s): Owner/breeder, Trainer

Horse racing career
- Sport: Horse racing

Major racing wins
- Belles Stakes (1893); Kentucky Oaks (1899, 1906, 1908, 1915); September Stakes (1899); Brighton Junior Stakes (1901); Clark Handicap (1910); Washington Handicap (1912); Alabama Stakes (1915); Champlain Handicap (1915); Delaware Handicap (1915) American Classic Race wins: Kentucky Derby (1902)

Significant horses
- Alan-a-Dale, The Manager

Thomas Clay McDowell (March 9, 1866 - February 9, 1935) was an American businessman, Thoroughbred racehorse owner/breeder, and trainer. He was a great-grandson of Henry Clay.

== Early life and education ==
Born at Ashland Farm in Lexington, Kentucky, Thomas was the fourth of the seven children of Anne Clay (1837–1917) and her husband, Major Henry Clay McDowell (1832–1899). His mother was the daughter of Henry Clay, Jr. In 1883 she and her husband purchased the 325-acre (1.32 km^{2}) estate from other Clay descendants. Henry Clay McDowell bred Standardbred horses for harness racing, and Thomas became interested in the breeding and training of racehorses.

== Marriage and family ==
In 1888 Thomas McDowell married Mary Mann Goodloe (1866–1953), with whom he had two children: Ann Clay McDowell (b. 1891) and son, William Cassius Goodloe McDowell (1895–1974).

== Career ==
In the early 1900s, McDowell worked as a trainer for the Thoroughbred stable of William Kissam Vanderbilt in Kentucky. He also had his own horses. McDowell is most notable as the breeder, owner, and trainer of the colt Alan-a-Dale, which won the 1902 Kentucky Derby. McDowell's other top horses included four fillies which each won the Kentucky Oaks, and The Manager, named the 1912 American Horse of the Year for his record of wins and money earned.

In 1925 Thomas McDowell acquired Buck Pond Farm in Versailles, Kentucky from the estate of Louis Marshall. McDowell introduced Thoroughbred horses to Buck Pond and operated it until his death in 1935. Joseph K. Nelson, a wealthy Chicago businessman and native of Woodford County, Kentucky, purchased the farm from McDowell's heirs in 1936.
