= Flash Stakes =

Former horse race in New York state

- Class: Discontinued Stakes
- Location: Saratoga Race Course; Saratoga Springs, New York, United States
- Inaugurated: 1869
- Race type: Thoroughbred - Flat racing

Race information
- Distance: 5 furlongs
- Surface: Dirt
- Qualification: Two-year-olds
- Weight: Weight-For-Age
- Purse: Varied over the years

The Flash Stakes was a race for two-year-old Thoroughbred horses and one of the longest running horse racing events in America. Run before races were graded, the Flash was won by a host of starry names. Begun before the United States Hotel Stakes (also now removed from racing's roster), it was the oldest race for juveniles of either gender in the United States.

Once a historic fixture in Saratoga Springs, New York at the Saratoga Race Course, it was eliminated in 2005 by the New York Racing Association (NYRA), which feared bankruptcy.

Moved from its home in Saratoga after a long absence, the Grade III Flash had raced on at Belmont Park as a five furlong sprint on the main track for a $100,000 added purse until the NYRA's 2005 decision.

== Winners since 1999 ==
Year	Winner	Jockey	Trainer	Owner	Time
2005	Beacon Shine	Javier Castellano	William I. Mott	Kinsman Stable	0:58.39
2004	Primal Storm	Shane Sellers	Steve Asmussen	Keith Asmussen	0:57.49
2003	Chapel Royal	John Velazquez	Todd A. Pletcher	Derrick Smith & Michael Tabor	0:57.02
2002	Whywhywhy	Edgar Prado	Patrick Biancone	Fabien Ouaki	0:57:10
2001	Busters Daydream	Edgar Prado	Timothy Tullock Jr.	S J Bee Stable	0:56.93
2000	Yonaguska	Jerry Bailey	D. Wayne Lukas	Michael Tabor	0:57.86
1999	More Than Ready	John Velazquez	Todd A. Pletcher	James T. Scatuorchio	0:57.10

== Earlier winners ==
- 1983 : 1998 - Not Run
- 1982 – Victorious
- 1981 – Ringaro
- 1972 : 1980 – Not Run
- 1971 – Riva Ridge
- 1969 – Pontifex
- 1967 – Forward Pass
- 1966 – Bold Hour
- 1965 – Indulto
- 1964 – New Act
- 1963 – Irvkup
- 1962 – Catullus
- 1961 – Jaipur
- 1960 – Not Run
- 1959 – Greek Page
- 1958 – First Minister
- 1957 – Wing Jet
- 1956 – Missile
- 1955 – Reneged
- 1954 – Laugh
- 1953 – Card Trick
- 1952 – Native Dancer
- 1951 – Cousin
- 1950 – Northern Star
- 1949 – Greek Ship
- 1948 – Algasir
- 1947 – Star Bout
- 1946 – Gestapo
- 1945 – Assault
- 1944 – Plebiscite
- 1943 – Tropea
- 1942 – Breezing Home
- 1941 – Amphitheater
- 1940 – Overdrawn
- 1939 – Epatant
- 1938 – Eight Thirty
- 1937 – Maetall
- 1936 – Maedic
- 1935 – Red Rain
- 1934 – Pitter Pat
- 1933 – Elylee
- 1932 – Happy Gal
- 1931 – Irenes Bob
- 1930 – Jamestown
- 1929 – Gallant Fox
- 1928 – Jack High
- 1927 – Distraction
- 1926 – Osmand
- 1925 – Sarmaticus
- 1924 – Felix
- 1923 – Lord Baltimore
- 1922 – Dust Flower
- 1921 – Miss Joy
- 1920 – Moody
- 1919 – Miss Jemima
- 1918 – Billy Kelly
- 1917 – Papp
- 1916 – Rickety
- 1915 – Prince of Como
- 1914 – Trial By Jury
- 1913 – Old Rosebud
- 1912 – Not Run
- 1911 – Not Run
- 1910 – Semproius
- 1909 – Waldo
- 1908 – Edward
- 1907 – Fair Play
- 1906 – Peter Pan
- 1905 – Burgomaster
- 1904 – Sysonby
- 1902 – Judith Campbell
- 1901 – Goldsmith
- 1900 – Not Run
- 1899 – Not Run
- 1898 – Not Run
- 1897 – Hamburg
- 1896 – Not Run
- 1895 – Oranetto
- 1894 – Lisa II
- 1893 – Galilee
- 1892 – Nick
- 1890 – Sir John
- 1889 – Protection
- 1888 – Princess Bowling
- 1887 – King Fish
- 1886 – Agnes
- 1885 – Primero
- 1884 – Volante
- 1883 – Burton
- 1882 – George Kinney
- 1881 – Memento
- 1879 – Sensation
- 1878 – Harold
- 1877 – Duke of Magenta
- 1875 – Faithless
- 1874 – Olitapa
- 1873 – Regardless
- 1872 – Tom Bowling
- 1870 – Ratan
- 1869 – Remorseless
