= 1928 Kentucky Derby =

Horse race

54th Kentucky Derby
- Kentucky Derby
- Location: Churchill Downs
- Date: May 19, 1928
- Winning horse: Reigh Count
- Jockey: Chick Lang
- Trainer: Bert S. Michell
- Owner: Fannie Hertz
- Conditions: Heavy
- Surface: Dirt

The 1928 Kentucky Derby was the 54th running of the Kentucky Derby. The race was run on May 19, 1928.

== Payout ==
The Kentucky Derby Payout Schedule

Program Number	Horse Name	Win	Place	Show
4	Reigh Count	$6.12	$5.78	$3.98
1	Misstep	–	$8.28	$5.90
7	Toro	–	–	$3.76

== Field ==
Position	Post	Horse	Jockey	Trainer	Owner	Final Odds	Stake
1	4	Reigh Count	Chick Lang	Bert S. Michell	Fannie Hertz	2.06	$55,375
2	1	Misstep	William Garner	Mose Lowenstein	Le Mar Stock Farm (Leo J. Marks)	10.20	$6,000
3	7	Toro	Eddie Ambrose	John F. Schorr	Edward Beale McLean	4.75	$3,000
4	8	Jack Higgins	Charles E. Allen	William J. Curran	William J. Curran	4.42	$1,000
5	5	Reigh Olga	Earl Pool	Bert S. Michell	Otto Lehman	2.06	
6	9	Lawley	Harold Thurber	Edward Trotter	Viking Stable (Christian & Klein)	4.42	
7	2	Don Q.	Pete Walls	Bud Stotler	Sagamore Stable	4.42	
8	20	Bobashela	Herb Fisher	S. Miller Henderson	Audley Farm Stable	12.08	
9	10	Blackwood	Frank Chiavetta	Burton B. Williams	Bloomfield Stable (Walter Briggs, Charles T. Fisher, Frank Navin)	4.42	
10	6	Martie Flynn	Willie Fronk	Robert V. McGarvey	Syl Peabody	14.18	
11	18	Sun Beau	John Craigmyle	Charles W. Carroll	Willis Sharpe Kilmer	38.42	
12	13	Bar None	Joe Kederis	William H. Buckner	Longridge Stable	4.42	
13	19	Distraction	Danny McAuliffe	George Tappen	Wheatley Stable	11.51	
14	15	Petee-Wrack	Albert Johnson	Willie Booth	John R. Macomber	4.42	
15	17	Typhoon	Edgar Barnes	H. Guy Bedwell	Kenton Farm Stable (John A. Payne Jr. & Robert H. West Jr.)	41.21	
16	11	Replevin	Virgil Peterson	J. S. Middleton	Frederick Johnson	4.42	
17	3	Cartago	Karl Horvath	John J. Flanigan	R. E. Lechleiter	4.42	
18	21	Bonivan	Charles Landolt	Jim Everman	A. A. Kaiser	4.42	
19	22	Charmarten	James Butwell	C. F. Cherry	Wild Rose Farm (Valentine "Val" Crane)	4.42	
20	12	Vito	Clarence Kummer	Max Hirsch	Alfred H. Cosden	39.04	
21	14	Sortie	Fred Weiner	Max Hirsch	A. Charles Schwartz	39.04	
22	16	Strolling Player	George Fields	Robert A. Smith	Salubria Stable	12.08	

- Margins – 3 Lengths
- Time – 2:10 2/5
- Track – Heavy
