= Luke McLuke =

20th-century American Thoroughbred racehorse

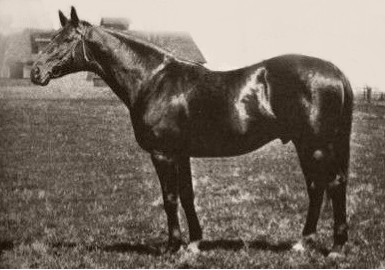
- Sire: Ultimus
- Grandsire: Commando
- Dam: Midge
- Damsire: Trenton
- Sex: Stallion
- Foaled: 1911
- Country: United States
- Color: Bay
- Breeder: James R. Keene
- Owner: Castleton Stud; William A. Prime; Edward R. Bradley; John W. Schorr; J. Oliver Keene
- Trainer: John F. Schorr
- Record: 6: 4-1-1
- Earnings: $22,050 (equivalent to $736,000 in 2025)

Major wins
- Carlton Stakes (1914); Kentucky Handicap (1914) American Classics wins: Belmont Stakes (1914)
- Last updated on November 18, 2010

Luke McLuke (1911 – c. 1929) was a bay Thoroughbred stallion born in the United States. He won the 1914 Belmont Stakes, the Carlton Stakes, Kentucky Handicap, and Grainger Memorial Handicap among his four wins from six starts. After his racing career was over, he became a breeding stallion, siring eleven stakes winners. Two of his daughters were named as year-end Champions in the United States.

== Breeding and background ==
Luke McLuke's sire was Ultimus, and his dam was an imported mare named Midge, a daughter of the English Thoroughbred Trenton. Midge's dam was another imported mare named Sandfly by the English stallion Isonomy. Ultimus was inbred to Commando, as both his sire and dam were sired by Domino. Ultimus never raced, however.

Luke McLuke was bred by James R. Keene at Castleton Stud, but was sold, along with the entire stock of the 1911 foal crop, in 1912 as yearlings. He was initially bought as part of a group lot of 16 colts, purchased by William A. Prime for $25,000 (equivalent to $834,000 in 2025), who promptly turned around sold the horses to Edward R. Bradley. Bradley then auctioned them off for a total of $57,650 (equivalent to $1,923,000 in 2025) shortly after purchasing them. John W. Schorr of Memphis, Tennessee, bought Luke McLuke for $1,700 (equivalent to $57,000 in 2025). Although unraced as a two-year-old, Luke McLuke raced as a three-year-old for Schorr. In Schorr's ownership, the stallion won the Belmont Stakes.

Luke McLuke was expected to be a sprinter, as his breeding, especially on his sire's side, mainly was raced at shorter distances.

== Racing career ==
Luke McLuke won the Belmont on June 20, 1914, carrying 126 lb (57 kg) and with Merritt Buxton as his jockey. He earned a total of $3025 (equivalent to $97,000 in 2025) for the win. The time for the 1 3/8 mi (2.2 km) race was 2 minutes and 20 seconds, beating Gainer and Charlestonian. On June 30, 1914, he ran in the Carleton Stakes, which was a 1-mile (1.6 km)-long race for three-year-olds. He earned $5,125 (equivalent to $165,000 in 2025) for the win, which was made in 1 minute 38 and 4/5 seconds. Luke McLuke carried 126 lb (57 kg) in the race, and his jockey was Merritt Buxton. He beat Charlestonian again, as well as Stromboli and Figinny. He also won the Kentucky Handicap and Grainger Memorial Handicap that year. The Grainger was a race for three-year-olds and up, at a distance of 1 1/4 mi (2.0 km) and was run at Churchill Downs in Louisville, Kentucky. Luke McLuke carried 100 lb (45 kg) in the race and was ridden by Andy Neylon for the win. Second place was Rudolfo, and third went to Solar Star. The win earned him $11,500 (equivalent to $370,000 in 2025), and the winning time was 2 minutes and 2 and 4/5 seconds.

Luke McLuke was trained by Schorr's son, John F. Schorr. Luke McLuke's race wins in 1914 helped make the elder Schorr the leading owner for 1914, the second time he earned that title. The younger Schorr was the leading trainer in 1914, the first time he topped that list. The stallion's overall racing record was four wins in six starts with one second and one third. His total earnings on the racetrack were $22,050 (equivalent to $736,000 in 2025).

== Breeding career and legacy ==
In 1925, Luke McLuke was owned by J. Oliver Keene and stood at stud at Keeneland Stud in Lexington, Kentucky. He sired 11 stakes winners, including Nellie Morse, Anita Peabody, and Mr. Sponge. Nellie Morse won the 1924 Preakness Stakes and was named the 1924 Champion Three-Year-Old-Filly. Anita Peabody won the Futurity Stakes and the Debutante Stakes and was named 1927 Champion Two-Year-Old Filly. In all, Luke McLuke sired 85 foals in 13 foal crops; 55 of his foals started races, with 40 of those starters winning races for a total of $449,783. His daughter Nellie Morse was the dam of Nellie Flag, the 1934 Champion Two-Year-Old Filly. After her racing career was over, Nellie Flag went on to become one of the foundation broodmares at Calumet Farm in Kentucky. A grandson was Three Bars, out of a Luke McLuke daughter named Myrtle Dee. Three Bars went on to become an influential sire of Quarter Horses, and was named to the American Quarter Horse Hall of Fame in 1989. Another daughter, Nursemaid, produced the 1966 Kentucky Broodmare of the Year, Juliet's Nurse. Luke McLuke's granddaughter Nellie Flag was, in turn, the dam of Mar-Kell, the 1943 Champion Handicap Mare.

The Chicago Tribune reported the death of Luke McLuke in February 1929, stating the horse had died suddenly in his exercise paddock at the farm of John Hertz many weeks before the press release. He was recorded as dead in the 1932 edition of the American Racing Manual.

== Pedigree ==
Domino*
Commando
Emma C
Ultimus
Domino*
Running Stream
*Dancing Water*
Luke McLuke
Musket
Trenton
Frailty
*Midge
Isonomy*
*Sandfly
Sandiway*

* Luke McLuke is inbred 3S x 3S to the stallion Domino, meaning that he appears third generation twice on the sire side of his pedigree.

* Luke McLuke is inbred 4S x 3D to the stallion Isonomy, meaning that he appears fourth generation (via Dancing Water) on the sire side of his pedigree, and third generation on the dam side of his pedigree.

* Luke McLuke is inbred 5S x 4D to the stallion Doncaster, meaning that he appears fifth generation (via Dancing Water) on the sire side of his pedigree, and fourth generation (via Sandiway) on the dam side of his pedigree.
