= Ben Ali Handicap =

Horse race in Lexington, Kentucky (1917–1932)

- Class: Discontinued stakes
- Location: Lexington Race Course
- Inaugurated: 1917
- Race type: Thoroughbred - Flat racing

Race information
- Distance: 5.75 furlongs
- Surface: Dirt
- Track: left-handed
- Qualification: Three years old and up

The Ben Ali Handicap was an American Thoroughbred horserace run eleven times between 1917 and 1932 at Lexington Race Course in Lexington, Kentucky. An important race usually run in April or early May, it was open to horses age three and older of either sex. The race was run on dirt over a distance of 5 3/4 furlongs for its final two runnings prior to which it had been contested at 1 1/16 miles (8.5 furlongs).

== Historical notes ==
The Ben Ali Handicap was named for James Ben Ali Haggin, one of America's most prominent owners and breeders, who died in 1914. His horse Ben Ali won the 1886 Kentucky Derby. The most notable winner of the race was Exterminator, the winner of the 1918 Kentucky Derby whose career saw him earn four national championships, including American Horse of the Year, plus induction into the United States Racing Hall of Fame.

The first edition of the Ben Ali Handicap took place on May 1, 1917, and was won by Colonel Vinnie, an English-bred horse owned by Jefferson Livingston. Between 1923 and 1927 the Ben Ali Handicap was not run. The final edition was held on April 16, 1932, in which Tannery won his second straight Ben Ali Handicap over nine opponents.

The Lexington Race Course ceased to conduct racing in 1933. A race of this same name was introduced at Keeneland Race Course in 1937.

== Records ==
Speed record:

- 1:45 flat @ 11/16 miles - Broadside (1929)

Most wins:

- 2 - Tannery (1931, 1932)

Most wins by a jockey:

- 2 - Willie Crump (1917, 1929)
- 2 - Mack Garner (1920, 1922)

Most wins by a trainer:

- No trainer won this race more than once

Most wins by an owner:

- No owner won this race more than once

== Winners ==
Year	Winner	Age	Jockey	Trainer	Owner	Dist.	Time	Win$
1932	Tannery	5	Gilbert Elston	John J. Greely Sr.	George Henze	5.75 F	1:10.40	$3,110
1931	Tannery	4	Kenneth Hoffman	Auval John Baker	Edward F. Prichard	5.75 F	1:09.20	$3,100
1930	Thistle Fyrn	4	Harold Thomas	Harry S. Hart	George Collins	11/16 M	1:46.00	$3,120
1929	Broadside	5	Willie Crump	Charles C. Van Meter	Lucas B. Combs	11/16 M	1:45.00	$3,200
1928	Genial Host	5	Frank Chiavettta	Jack McPherson	Fair Acre Farm Stable (David T. Matlack)	11/16 M	1:47.40	$3,200
1923	1927	Race not held						
1922	United Verde	4	Mack Garner	George V. Barnes	Charles W. Clark	11/16 M	1:45.60	$3,280
1921	Best Pal	4	Lawrence Lyke	Herbert J. Thompson	Edward R. Bradley	11/16 M	1:46.60	$3,000
1920	General Haig	4	Mack Garner	Robert V. McGarvey	W. O. Stoner	11/16 M	1:50.00	$3,460
1919	Exterminator	4	John Morys	Henry McDaniel	Willis Sharpe Kilmer	11/16 M	1:50.40	$2,615
1918	Opportunity	4	Earl Pool	Will Woodward	Will Woodward	11/16 M	1:53.80	$1,710
1917	Colonel Vennie	4	Willie Crump	Mose Goldblatt	Jefferson Livingston	11/16 M	1:46.00	$1,941
