= Chick Lang =

Canadian jockey

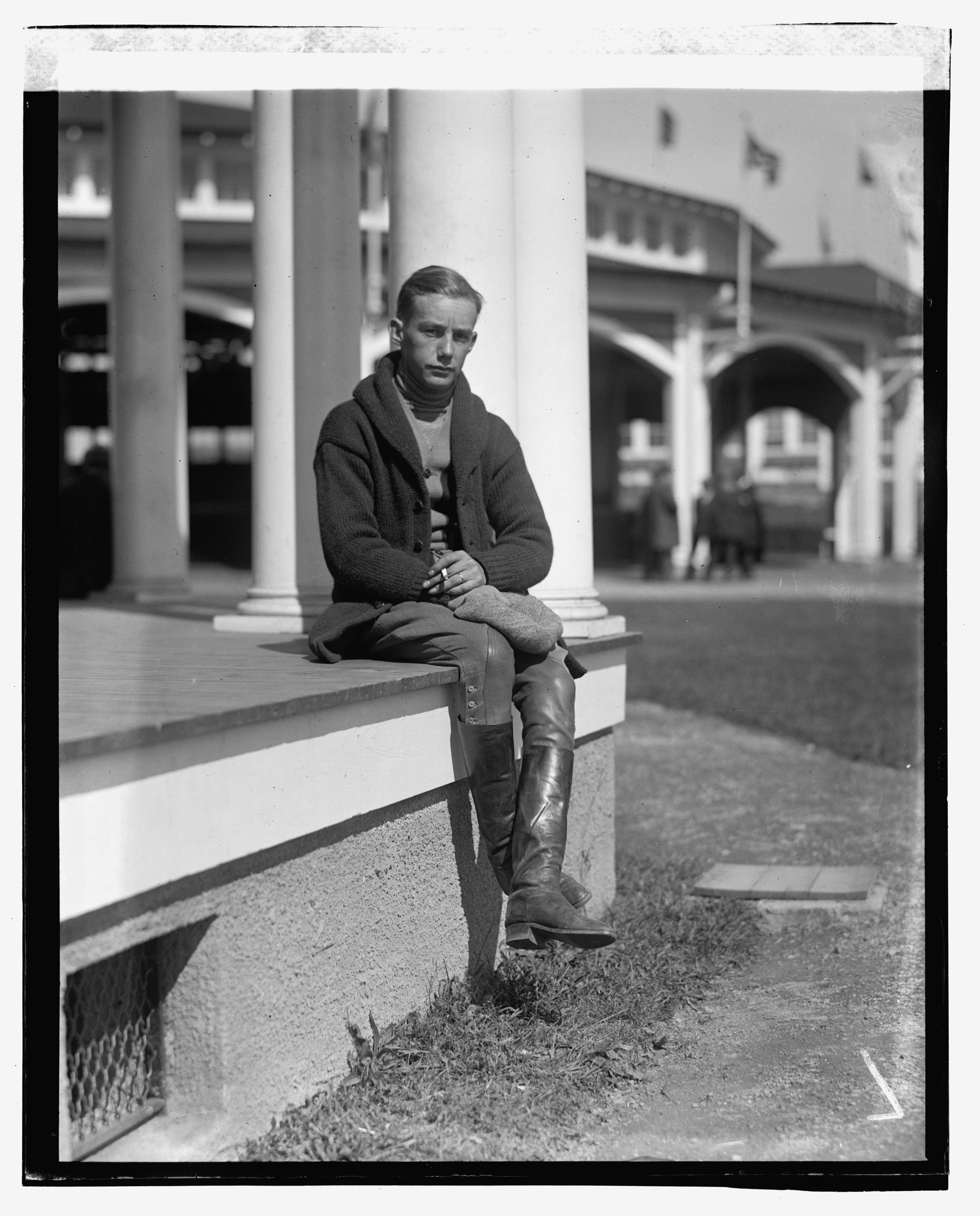

Personal information
- Born: July 1905 Hamilton, Ontario, Canada
- Died: June 14, 1947 (aged 41) Wilmington, Delaware, United States
- Occupation: Jockey/ Trainer/Owner

Horse racing career
- Sport: Horse racing
- Career wins: 601

Major racing wins
- New Year's Handicap (1921); Amityville Handicap (1922); Century Handicap (1922); Gazelle Stakes (1922); Rosedale Stakes (1922); Dwyer Stakes (1923); Jockey Club Gold Cup (1923, 1928); Potomac Handicap (1923); Adirondack Stakes (1924); Burwood Purse (1924); Bowie Handicap (1925); Mardi Gras Handicap (1926); Belmont Futurity Stakes (1927); Glen Oaks Handicap (1927); Kentucky Jockey Club Stakes (1927); Walden Handicap (1927); Maryland Handicap (1927); Walden Stakes (1927); Havre de Grace Cup Handicap (1928); Huron Handicap (1928); Miller Stakes (1928); Lawrence Realization Stakes (1928); Saratoga Cup (1928) Canadian Classic Race wins: King's Plate (1925); American Classic Race wins: Kentucky Derby (1928)

Racing awards
- United States Champion Jockey by wins (1921)

Honours
- Canadian Horse Racing Hall of Fame (1990)

Significant horses
- Anita Peabody, Fairbank, Reigh Count

Charles John "Chick" Lang (July 1905 – June 14, 1947) was a Canadian Hall of Fame jockey who became a National Champion rider in the United States and who won the most prestigious Thoroughbred horse race of both countries.

Born in Hamilton, Ontario, the son of Emma and Charles Percival Lang, he was almost always known by the nickname "Chick." At age fifteen he began riding locally until American racing stable owner James Arthur recognized his potential and signed him to a contract to compete at major racetracks in the United States. Lang made his American debut at the Havre de Grace Racetrack in Maryland in April 1921 and went on to overcome the long lead held by Benny Marinelli to become the leading rider in the United States in 1921 with 192 wins. Such was his performance that a May 17, 1922 edition of the Pittsburgh Press wrote that "Many racing experts credit Lang with being the best jockey since the days of Tod Sloan. This high accolade came at a time when Lang was competing against racing greats such as Earl Sande, Jimmy Butwell, Laverne Fator, Clarence Kummer, Linus McAtee and Ivan Parke, among others.

In 1922, Lang picked up where he left off, winning eighteen races in the first nine racing days in January at the Fair Grounds Race Course in New Orleans. On January 11 he won four of the seven races run. When the New Orleans racing season ended, Lang headed north to compete at Pimlico Race Course and Havre de Grace in Maryland, Jamaica Race Course, Saratoga Race Course, Aqueduct Racetrack and Belmont Park in New York.

In May 1922, oil baron and stable owner Joshua Cosden purchased Chick Lang's contract for a then record US$25,000. The seventeen-year-old Lang finished 1922 with 186 wins, just one win behind Mark Fator who won the U.S. riding title with 187. The final day of 1922 fell on a Sunday and Lang, who had a two-win lead, did not race while Fator won three races at Agua Caliente Racetrack in Tijuana, Mexico.

== North American Classic wins ==
In 1925, Chick Lang won the 66th running of the King's Plate on James C. Fletcher's filly, Fairbank, defeating Duchess, the betting favorite owned by the powerful Seagram Stables. It was a race that the Ottawa Citizen newspaper described as "one of the greatest struggles for the historic trophy in its long history." Three years later, he won the 54th running of the Kentucky Derby with Reigh Count which was owned by Fannie Hertz.

After years battling weight gain, Chick Lang was forced to retire as a rider at the end of July in 1929 but remained in the industry as a trainer. He conditioned horses at racetracks in Florida in the winter and went north to race in the summer months. He trained horses at Delaware Park Racetrack each year after that facility opened in 1937.

== Family ==
Chick Lang married Virginia Mayberry, the daughter of trainer John P. Mayberry who won the 1903 Kentucky Derby with Judge Himes. The couple had a daughter and a son. Chick Lang Jr. was involved in the sport of horse racing. He gained wide respect for the job he did during the twenty-seven years he served as general manager of Pimlico and Laurel Park racetracks.

Following a lengthy Illness, Chick Lang died on June 14, 1947, at age forty-one in Wilmington, Delaware where he had been training at Delaware Park. The opening line for his obituary in the Wilmington, Delaware Sunday Morning Star began with "One of the racing world's most outstanding jockeys."

Chick Lang was inducted in the Canadian Horse Racing Hall of Fame in 1990.
