= 1932 Kentucky Derby =

Horse race

58th Kentucky Derby
- Kentucky Derby
- Grade I stakes race
- Location: Churchill Downs
- Date: May 7, 1932
- Winning horse: Burgoo King
- Jockey: Eugene James
- Trainer: Herbert J. Thompson
- Owner: Edward R. Bradley
- Surface: Dirt

The 1932 Kentucky Derby was the 58th running of the Kentucky Derby. The race took place on May 7, 1932.

== Full results ==
Finished	Post	Horse	Jockey	Trainer	Owner	Time / behind
1st	13	Burgoo King	Eugene James	Herbert J. Thompson	Edward R. Bradley	2:05.20
2nd	10	Economic	Francis Horn	Clarence Buxton	Jerome H. Louchheim	5
3rd	4	Stepenfetchit	Lavelle Ensor	James W. Healy	Liz Whitney	Head
4th	11	Brandon Mint	George Ellis	Frank M. Bray	Brandon Stable	1/2
5th	5	Over Time	Earl Sande	James W. Healy	Liz Whitney	Nose
6th	6	Tick On	Pete Walls	Max Hirsch	Loma Stable	Nose
7th	3	Our Fancy	Charles E. Allen	Charles H. Trotter	Jerome B. Respess	4
8th	19	Gallant Sir	George Woolf	Elwood L. Fitzgerald	Northway Stable	1
9th	8	Hoops	R. Fischer	Claude Hunt	William F. Knebelkamp	2
10th	12	Cold Check	Willie Garner	Willie Crump	James W. Parrish	1/2
11th	7	Adobe Post	Charles Landolt	C. E. Gross	Knebelkamp & Morris	1 1/2
12th	1	Crystal Prince	Charles Corbett	Raymond White	P. C. Thompson	3
13th	2	Oscillation	Evan Neal	William H. Buckner	Longride Stable	3
14th	17	Prince Hotspur	Arthur Anderson	Nathaniel K. Beal	Joseph Leiter Estate	2
15th	14	Cee Tee	Clarence McCrossen	Clyde Van Dusen	Dixiana	1 1/2
16th	20	Cathop	Lester Pichon	J. Thomas Taylor	R. M. Eastman	4
17th	16	Lucky Tom	Anthony Pascuma	Henry C. Riddle	J. J. Robinson	1/2
18th	9	Thistle Ace	Gilbert Elston	Thomas Sanford	George Collins	8
19th	18	Brother Joe	Laverne Fator	Herbert J. Thompson	Edward R. Bradley	8
20th	15	Liberty Limited	Mack Garner	John F. Schorr	Three D's Stock Farm	DNF

== Payout ==
Post	Horse	Win	Place	Show
13	Burgoo King	$ 13.24	5.08	4.00
10	Economic		15.62	8.54
4	Stepenfetchit			3.52

- The winner received a purse of $52,350 and a $5,000 Gold Cup.
- Second place received $6,000.
- Third place received $3,000.
- Fourth place received $1,000.
