= Walden Stakes =

- Class: Discontinued stakes
- Location: Pimlico Race Course; Baltimore, Maryland, USA
- Inaugurated: 1906-1948
- Race type: Thoroughbred - Flat racing

Race information
- Distance: 11/16 miles (8.5 furlongs)
- Track: Dirt, left-handed
- Qualification: Two-years-old

The Walden Stakes is a discontinued Thoroughbred horse race run from 1906 through 1948 at Pimlico Race Course in Baltimore, Maryland. Raced on dirt, the event was open to two-year-olds horses of either sex. The race was named in honor of Maryland-based trainer and owner Wyndham Walden, a Hall of Fame inductee who won eleven American Classic Races, capturing the Preakness Stakes seven times and the Belmont Stakes four times.

For the first three years the Walden Stakes was contested at a distance of six furlongs, but because it was run in November it was changed in 1909 to one mile so that the year's top class juvenile horses would be tested at a longer distance with a view to their upcoming three-year-old season when races at a mile and longer would be commonplace. Among those top class two-year-olds who won the Walden Stakes were U.S. Racing Hall of Fame inductees Reigh Count (1927) and his son Count Fleet (1943), Whirlaway (1940), and Alsab (1941). Reigh Count went on to win the 1929 Kentucky Derby, Alsab finished second in the 1942 Kentucky Derby, and both Whirlaway and Count Fleet won the U.S. Triple Crown series. In addition, the 1930 Walden Stakes winner Mate went on to win the 1931 Preakness Stakes.

Race distances:

- 1 1/16 miles : 1928-1948
- 1 mile : 1909-1927
- 6 furlongs : 1906-1908

In 1923, the Walden Stakes was run in two divisions.

== Records ==
Speed record:

- 1 mile: 1:39 2/5, Senator Norris (1923)
- 1 1/16 miles: 1:43 flat, Stone Age (1948)

Most wins by a jockey:

- 2 - Tommy McTaggart (1912, 1915)
- 2 - Johnny Loftus (1917, 1918)
- 2 - Laverne Fator (1919, 1928)
- 2 - Don Meade (1932, 1933)
- 2 - Wayne Wright (1934, 1935)
- 2 - Johnny Longden (1938, 1942)

Most wins by a trainer:

- 3 - Sam Hildreth (1910, 1919, 1923)
- 3 - Max Hirsch (1926, 1931, 1947)
- 3 - Ben A. Jones (1938, 1940, 1946)

Most wins by an owner:

- 3 - George D. Widener Jr. (1916, 1933, 1943)

== Winners ==
Year	Winner	Jockey	Trainer	Owner	Dist. (Miles) / (Furlongs)	Time
1948	Stone Age	Nick Combest	William C. Winfrey	Alfred G. Vanderbilt II	11/16 M	1:43.00
1947	Gasparilla	Warren Mehrtens	Max Hirsch	Arthur J. Sackett	11/16 M	1:49.00
1946	Fervent	Douglas Dodson	Ben A. Jones	Calumet Farm	11/16 M	1:45.80
1945	Colony Boy	John Gilbert	Tom Smith	Maine Chance Farm	11/16 M	1:50.60
1944	Rick's Raft	Nick Jemas	Edward L. Snyder	William G. Helis Sr.	11/16 M	1:45.80
1943	Platter	Conn McCreary	Winbert F. Mulholland	George D. Widener Jr.	11/16 M	1:48.60
1942	Count Fleet	Johnny Longden	Don Cameron	Fannie Hertz	11/16 M	1:44.80
1941	Alsab	Robert Vedder	Sarge Swenke	Albert Sabath	11/16 M	1:44.60
1940	Whirlaway	George Woolf	Ben A. Jones	Calumet Farm	11/16 M	1:52.20
1939	Faymar	Joseph Renick	James W. Smith	Dixiana Stable	11/16 M	1:46.00
1938	Inscoelda	Johnny Longden	Ben A. Jones	Woolford Farm	11/16 M	1:49.00
1937	Nedayr	Eddie Arcaro	William A. Crawford	Willis Sharpe Kilmer	11/16 M	1:45.80
1936	Brooklyn	Silvio Coucci	Herbert J. Thompson	Edward R. Bradley	11/16 M	1:47.20
1935	Ned Reigh	Wayne Wright	Henry McDaniel	Willis Sharpe Kilmer	11/16 M	1:49.80
1934	Firethorn	Wayne Wright	Preston M. Burch	Walter M. Jeffords Sr.	11/16 M	1:46.20
1933	Chicstraw	Don Meade	A. Jack Joyner	George D. Widener Jr.	11/16 M	1:44.60
1932	War Glory	Don Meade	George H. Conway	Glen Riddle Farm	11/16 M	1:50.20
1931	On Post	Joe Renick	Max Hirsch	Loma Stable (Mrs. Louis G. Kaufman)	11/16 M	1:45.40
1930	Mate	George Ellis	James W. Healy	Albert C. Bostwick Jr.	11/16 M	1:46.60
1929	Ned O	Charlie Quattlebaum	George W. Foreman	George W. Foreman	11/16 M	1:47.60
1928	Twink	Laverne Fator	James W. Healy	Loma Stable (Mrs. Louis G. Kaufman)	11/16 M	1:46.00
1927	Reigh Count	Chick Lang	Bert S. Michell	Fannie Hertz	1 M	1:41.00
1926	Rip Rap	Steve O'Donnell	Max Hirsch	Sage Stable (H. W. & A. G. Sage)	1 M	1:41.00
1925	Mars	Harry Richards	Robert Augustus Smith	Walter M. Jeffords Sr.	1 M	1:42.00
1924	Single Foot	Charles Fairbrother	Harry Rites	J. Edwin Griffith	1 M	1:39.80
1923-1	Stanwix	Mark Fator	Sam Hildreth	Rancocas Stable	1 M	1:39.80
1923-2	Senator Norris	Bennie Breuning	H. Guy Bedwell	Kenton Stable	1 M	1:39.40
1922	Oui Oui	William Pool	William D. Covington	Montfort & B. B. Jones	1 M	1:40.20
1921	Relay	Lewis Morris	James E. Fitzsimmons	Quincy Stable	1 M	1:44.20
1920	Idle Dell	John Callahan	Scott P. Harlan	Lawrence Waterbury II	1 M	1:40.40
1919	Dominique	Laverne Fator	Sam Hildreth	Sam Hildreth	1 M	1:42.00
1918	War Pennant	Johnny Loftus	H. Guy Bedwell	J. K. L. Ross	1 M	1:40.40
1917	War Cloud	Johnny Loftus	Walter B. Jennings	A. Kingsley Macomber	1 M	1:41.40
1916	Columbine	Eddie Ambrose	A. Jack Joyner	George D. Widener Jr.	1 M	1:41.00
1915	Colonel Vennie Ŧ	Tommy McTaggart	M. Preston	Jefferson Livingston	1 M	1:42.00
1914	Double Eagle	Charles Burlingame	Stephen J. Lawler	Quincy Stable	1 M	1:40.60
1913	Superintendent	Buddy Glass	Clarence Merritt	James F. Mannix	1 M	1:41.80
1912	Ten Point	Tommy McTaggart	Calvin Banks	Anthony L. Aste	1 M	1:40.00
1911	Penobscot	James Diggins	Thomas J. Healey	Richard T. Wilson Jr.	1 M	1:41.80
1910	Zeus	Carroll H. Shilling	Sam Hildreth	Sam Hildreth	1 M	1:46.60
1909	Fauntleroy	Joe McCahey	Robert J. Walden	Mrs.R. W. Walden	1 M	1:40.60
1908	Trance	David Nicol	George M. Odom	George M. Odom	6 F	1:13.00
1907	Jubilee	Bub McCabe	Fred Littlefield	Fred Littlefield	6 F	1:15.00
1906	Orphan Lad	Jimmy Dennison	William M. Garth	David Dunlop	6 F	1:14.25

- Ŧ - In the November 6, 1915 race Celandria finished first but was disqualified.
