= Eric Guerin =

American jockey

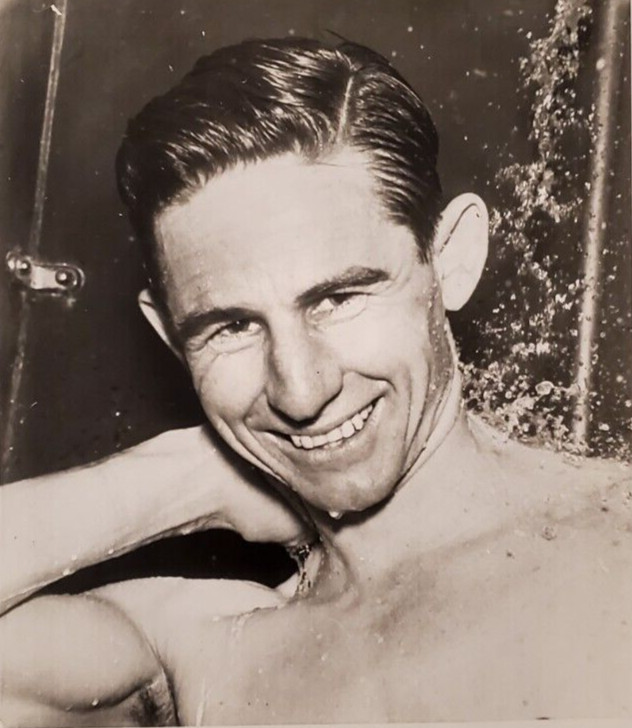
- Guerin in 1953

Personal information
- Born: October 23, 1924 Maringouin, Louisiana, U.S.
- Died: March 21, 1993 (aged 68) Fort Lauderdale, Florida, U.S.
- Occupation: Jockey

Horse racing career
- Sport: Horse racing
- Career wins: 2,712

Major racing wins
- Astoria Stakes (1944, 1952, 1957); Bay Shore Handicap (1944, 1949, 1952); Carter Handicap (1944, 1951); Roamer Handicap (1945); Wilson Stakes (1945); Alabama Stakes (1946, 1947, 1956); Great American Stakes (1946); National Stallion Stakes (1946); Fleetwing Handicap (1947); Tremont Stakes (1946, 1949, 1952); Youthful Stakes (1947, 1952, 1954, 1958); American Legion Handicap (1948); Futurity Stakes (1948, 1952); Hopeful Stakes (1948, 1950, 1951, 1952); Comely Stakes (1948, 1951, 1953); Saratoga Special Stakes (1948, 1951, 1952); Test Stakes (1948, 1954); Marguerite Stakes (1949, 1952); National Stallion Stakes (filly division) (1949, 1952, 1957, 1959); Ladies Handicap (1949, 1950, 1960); Matron Stakes (1949, 1956); Questionnaire Handicap (1949, 1951); Coaching Club American Oaks (1950, 1953, 1960); Gazelle Handicap (1950, 1953, 1960); Prioress Stakes (1950, 1953, 1955); Champlain Handicap (1951); Manhattan Handicap (1951, 1954); Saratoga Cup (1951, 1955); Beldame Stakes (1952, 1954, 1960); Firenze Handicap (1952); Travers Stakes (1952, 1953, 1963); Arlington Classic (1953); Wood Memorial Stakes (1953); Withers Stakes (1953, 1958); Edgemere Handicap (1954); Metropolitan Handicap (1954); Peter Pan Stakes (1954); Whitney Handicap (1954); Saratoga Handicap (1955); Fashion Stakes (1956, 1957); Maskette Stakes (1959); Mother Goose Stakes (1960) American Classics wins: Kentucky Derby (1947); Preakness Stakes (1953); Belmont Stakes (1953, 1954)

Racing awards
- United States' leading apprentice jockey (1942)

Honours
- United States Racing Hall of Fame (1972); Louisiana Sports Hall of Fame (1984); Fair Grounds Racing Hall of Fame (1991)

Significant horses
- Jet Pilot, Berlo, Bed o'Roses, Native Dancer; Idun, Blue Peter, One Count, Battlefield, Your Host, Grecian Queen
- Updated on April 6, 2011

Oliver Eric Guerin (October 23, 1924 – March 21, 1993) was an American Hall of Fame jockey.

Eric Guerin was born in Maringouin, Louisiana, in Cajun backwater country, twenty-four miles west of Baton Rouge. He was the son of an impoverished Cajun blacksmith. His older cousin Norman Leblanc had become a jockey, then a horse trainer, and in 1938 the fourteen-year-old Guerin quit school to go to work for his cousin at the Fair Grounds Race Course in New Orleans. For two years, the teenager cleaned out horse stalls and began learning to ride by exercising horses. He then signed a contract to work for a Texas businessman's stable, a job that afforded him the opportunity to travel to racetracks around the country. Before long, his contract was sold to another stable owner, a common practise at the time, and Guerin began his career as a thoroughbred horse racing jockey in 1941 at sixteen at Narragansett Park near Pawtucket, Rhode Island. Riding for a top stable proved to be Guerin's big break as a year later he was the United States' leading apprentice jockey. Within a few years, he was a highly regarded jockey on the East Coast racing circuit and in 1944 was involved in a racing rarity when he was part of a triple dead heat for first place in the Carter Handicap at Aqueduct Racetrack.

Known for his cool head and steady hand, Guerin was hired by cosmetics magnate Elizabeth Arden to ride for her Maine Chance Farm. Teamed up with future Hall of Fame trainer Tom Smith, he rode Jet Pilot to victory in the 1947 Kentucky Derby. His reputation soon led to a lucrative contract offer from Alfred G. Vanderbilt II to join his Sagamore Stable. There, working with another future Hall of Fame trainer, Bill Winfrey, Guerin scored numerous important victories, notably with Champion fillies Bed o'Roses and Next Move.

In 1952, thoroughbred racing gained a multitude of new fans when the Kentucky Derby was broadcast on television for the first time. That year, Guerin rode Native Dancer through an undefeated season with the colt earning the Eclipse Award as Champion 2-year-old and was voted Horse of the Year and American Champion in two of the three major polls. Much publicity surrounded the Sagamore team as the 1953 racing season got under way. For the final prep race leading up to the Kentucky Derby, American fans for the first time were able to watch the live telecast of the Grade 1 Wood Memorial Stakes. Through the new type of personalized racing coverage that began introducing jockeys to a nationwide audience, NBC broadcaster Win Elliott interviewed Guerin after he rode the still-undefeated Native Dancer to victory.

Guerin and Native Dancer appeared invincible as they headed to Churchill Downs for the first of the U.S. Triple Crown races. Shocked fans, both in the stands and on television, watched as the colt finished second after being bumped by another horse early in the race. Native Dancer never lost another race and went on to capture the next two legs of the Triple Crown series, the Preakness and Belmont Stakes. The following year Guerin rode Native Dancer to the Eclipse Award for Horse of the Year honors, and for himself, made it back-to-back Belmont wins by riding High Gun to victory in the 1954 classic.

In 1972, Guerin was still riding when he was elected to the National Museum of Racing and Hall of Fame. Three years later, at age fifty-one, after a thirty-four-year career that produced 2,712 winners, he retired. After moving to Fort Lauderdale, Florida in 1989, Guerin worked as a mutuels clerk at Calder Race Course and Gulfstream Park.

In 1991, Guerin was inducted into the Fair Grounds Racing Hall of Fame.

He developed a blood disorder and died of heart complications in 1993 at sixty-eight. His ashes were spread amongst the flower beds in the winner's circle at Gulfstream Park.

Guerin's Hall of Fame contemporary, Eddie Arcaro, asserted: "There was no better rider than Eric."
