= Nellie Morse =

American-bred Thoroughbred racehorse

- Sire: Luke McLuke
- Grandsire: Ultimus
- Dam: La Venganza
- Damsire: Abercorn
- Sex: Filly
- Foaled: 1921
- Country: United States
- Color: Bay
- Breeder: J. Oliver Keene & William Cleveland
- Owner: Bud Fisher
- Trainer: Albert B. Gordon
- Record: 34: 7-?-?
- Earnings: $73,565

Major wins
- Fashion Stakes (1923); Pimlico Oaks (1924) American Triple Crown race wins: Preakness Stakes (1924)

Awards
- American Champion Three-Year-Old Filly (1924)

Honors
- Nellie Morse Stakes at Laurel Park Racecourse
- Last updated on June 28, 2007

Nellie Morse (1921–1941) was an American Thoroughbred racehorse best known as the fourth filly to win the Preakness Stakes. After her retirement from racing, she became a successful and influential broodmare.

== Background ==
Her sire was Luke McLuke, who won the 1914 Belmont Stakes and was a son of the important but unraced Ultimus, who was sired by Commando. From the mare La Venganza, Nellie Morse's damsire was the Australian multi-race winner Abercorn.

Owned by the prominent American cartoonist Bud Fisher, Nellie Morse was trained by Albert B. Gordon.

== Racing career ==
Sent to the track at age two, the filly won the five-furlong Fashion Stakes at Belmont Park and was second in the Spinaway Stakes. In the Matron Stakes, she finished ahead of future U.S. Racing Hall of Fame inductee Princess Doreen but was second to Greentree Stables' winning filly Tree Top.

In 1924, she won the 1 1/8 miles (1.8 km) Pimlico Oaks at Pimlico Race Course in Baltimore, Maryland. Racing against colts, on May 12, 1924, Nellie Morse won the second of what became the American Classic Races: the Preakness Stakes. She was the fourth filly to win the Preakness since its inception fifty-one years earlier in 1873, and was the last filly winner until Rachel Alexandra won the 2009. Nellie Morse then finished third - placed second via disqualification of the apparent winner Glide - to Princess Doreen in the Kentucky Oaks at Churchill Downs.

== Breeding record ==
Retired from racing to serve as a broodmare, Nellie Morse was notably mated to Reigh Count, producing Count Morse, winner of the 1937 Ben Ali Stakes and Clark Handicap. Her mating to American Flag produced the filly Nellie Flag, who was the 1934 American Champion Two-Year-Old Filly. Through Nellie Flag, her later descendants include Mark-Ye-Well, Bold Forbes and Bet Twice.

Nellie Morse died in 1941 at age twenty.

== Breeding ==
Pedigree of Nellie Morse
Sire Luke McLuke bay 1911	Ultimus ch. 1906	Commando	Domino
Sire Luke McLuke bay 1911	Ultimus ch. 1906	Commando	Emma C.
Sire Luke McLuke bay 1911	Ultimus ch. 1906	Running Stream	Domino
Sire Luke McLuke bay 1911	Ultimus ch. 1906	Running Stream	Dancing Water
Sire Luke McLuke bay 1911	Midge black 1902	Trenton	Musket
Sire Luke McLuke bay 1911	Midge black 1902	Trenton	Frailty
Sire Luke McLuke bay 1911	Midge black 1902	Sandfly	Isonomy
Sire Luke McLuke bay 1911	Midge black 1902	Sandfly	Sandiway
Dam La Venganza bay 1902	Abercorn ch. 1884	Chester	Yattendon
Dam La Venganza bay 1902	Abercorn ch. 1884	Chester	Lady Chester
Dam La Venganza bay 1902	Abercorn ch. 1884	Cinnamon	Goldsborough
Dam La Venganza bay 1902	Abercorn ch. 1884	Cinnamon	Brown Duchess
Dam La Venganza bay 1902	Colonial brown 1897	Trenton	Musket
Dam La Venganza bay 1902	Colonial brown 1897	Trenton	Frailty
Dam La Venganza bay 1902	Colonial brown 1897	Thankful Blossum	Paradox
Dam La Venganza bay 1902	Colonial brown 1897	Thankful Blossum	The Apple
