= Chick Lang Jr. =

American businessman

Charles John "Chick" Lang Jr. (1926 – March 18, 2010) was an American businessman and general manager of the Maryland Jockey Club.

== Family ==
Chick Lang's father, Chick Lang, was a Canadian-born jockey who became a U.S. National Champion jockey and winner of the 1921 Kentucky Derby. His maternal grandfather was Thoroughbred trainer John P. Mayberry who won the 1903 Kentucky Derby.

== Career ==
During the 1970s and 1980s, Lang wore several hats in the racing business but was perhaps best known in his roles as general manager of the Maryland Jockey Club tracks, Pimlico and Laurel. He also was the jockey agent for Bill Hartack, when Hartack rose to prominence during his Hall of Fame career in the 1950s. In his later years, Lang served as a consultant and commentator for numerous tracks and media outlets.

Chick Lang was credited with bringing the Preakness national attention when the Kentucky Derby overshadowed it. He tirelessly promoted the Baltimore race, and traveled to the Kentucky Derby with signs reading, "Next Stop Preakness". He once floated hundreds of yellow and black balloons over the Kentucky Derby Parade.

Lang started as a successful jockey's agent and worked at Pimlico from 1960 to 1987, holding the positions of director of racing, vice president, and general manager. In 1965, he brought a school bus full of his daughter's friends to the infield to watch the races.

== Death ==
Chick Lang died on March 18, 2010, of natural causes at The Pines, a medical care facility in Easton, Maryland, at the age of 83. He is survived by his wife of 63 years, the former Nancy Christman, a daughter, Deborah Tessier, of Monkton; a sister, June Rossi, of Coral Gables, Florida; six grandchildren; and 12 great-grandchildren. He was predeceased by a son, Charles Robert Lang, a former jockey's agent and turf writer for The Evening Sun, who died in 1994.

According to Mrs. Lang, "Chick's wishes were to be cremated and to have his ashes sprinkled in the winner's circle at Pimlico."

== Legacy ==
The Maryland Jockey Club plans to rename the Hirsch Jacobs Grade 3 sprint for three-year-olds the Chick Lang Stakes, which will be part of the Preakness under card.
