= Exterminator (horse) =

American-bred Thoroughbred racehorse

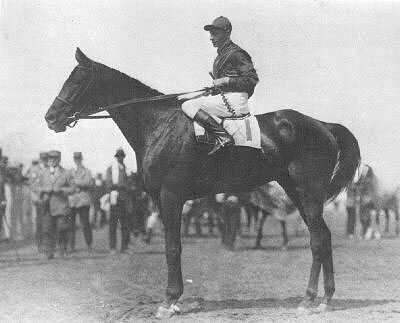
- Exterminator, 1922
- Sire: McGee
- Grandsire: White Knight
- Dam: Fair Empress
- Damsire: Jim Gore
- Sex: Gelding
- Foaled: 1915
- Country: United States
- Colour: Chestnut
- Breeder: F. D. "Dixie" Knight
- Owner: J. Cal Milam; Willis Sharpe Kilmer; Silks: Green, Brown Sash, Orange Sleeves, Green Cap
- Trainer: J. Cal Milam; Henry McDaniel; J. Simon Healy; William McDaniel; Fred Curtis; Willie Knapp; Eugene Wayland; William Shields; John I. Smith; Mike Terry
- Record: 99: 50–17–17
- Earnings: $252,996

Major wins
- Ben Ali Handicap (1919); Pimlico Cup (1919, 1920, 1921); Saratoga Cup (1919, 1920, 1921, 1922); Toronto Autumn Cup (1920, 1921, 1922); Brookdale Handicap (1920); Jockey Club Cup Handicap (1920); Merchants and Citizens Handicap (1921); Autumn Gold Cup (1921, 1922); Clark Handicap (1922); Brooklyn Handicap (1922); Philadelphia Handicap (1923) American Classics wins: Kentucky Derby (1918)

Awards
- U.S. Champion Older Male Horse (1920, 1921, 1922); American Horse of the Year (1922)

Honours
- United States Racing Hall of Fame (1957); Canadian Horse Racing Hall of Fame (2016) #29—Top 100 U.S. Racehorses of the 20th Century
- Last updated on September 22, 2006

Exterminator (May 30, 1915 – September 26, 1945) was an American Thoroughbred Hall of Fame racehorse, the winner of the 1918 Kentucky Derby and in 1922 Horse of the Year honors.

== Background ==
The lanky chestnut colt was bred by F. D. "Dixie" Knight (Mrs. M.J. Mizner, Knight's mother, was said to be the actual breeder) and foaled at Almahurst Farm near Lexington, Kentucky. Exterminator was sired by McGee, who also produced Donerail, the winner of the 1913 Kentucky Derby. At the Saratoga Paddock sale of 1916, he was bought as a yearling for $1,500 by J. Cal Milam who trained his own horses. The big colt grew fast, reaching 16.3 hands (67 inches, 170 cm) at two but he was awkward and coarse looking. For this reason, Milam had him gelded.

== Racing career ==
=== 1917: two-year-old season ===
On June 30, 1917, at Latonia Race Track in Covington, Kentucky, Exterminator made his debut in a six-furlong maiden race that he won by three lengths. Sent to race in Windsor, Ontario, Canada, he suffered a muscle sprain and Milam gave him time off to grow into his size, which by now was 17 hands. Still, he had earned $1,500 and a potential nomination to the Kentucky Derby.

=== 1918: Three-year-old season ===
Before Exterminator could begin his third season, Milam sold him to Willis Sharpe Kilmer for $9,000 and a pair of fillies, quite a bit of money for the times, especially as Kilmer had only authorized his future U.S. Hall of Fame trainer, Henry McDaniel, to pay about $700 for a "workhorse." Kilmer bought Exterminator to help his prized colt Sun Briar in his workouts. (Kilmer had purchased his colt at the same sale Milam bought his, but for $5,000.)

Kilmer did not think much of his new purchase; he called him "that truck horse" or "the goat". In workouts, Exterminator was supposed to stay behind Sun Briar merely to urge him on to greater effort, but he ran easily beside the other horse unless held back. Sun Briar had topped his juvenile division, winning five of nine starts and being named American Champion Two-Year-Old Colt. McDaniel was impressed by Exterminator and considered him the most intelligent thoroughbred he had ever known.

As the Derby approached, Sun Briar developed ringbone and Kilmer suddenly had no horse for the race. McDaniel urged him to enter Exterminator, but Kilmer would not hear of running "that goat" in his colors. It took Colonel Matt Winn, president of Churchill Downs, to convince him. Winn had seen the colt's workouts and was very impressed.

The morning of the race, it poured with rain, and the track was deep in mud. Exterminator had not raced since age two, and none of his races could be considered a suitable prep for the prestigious Kentucky Derby. Ridden by a disappointed Willie Knapp, who had expected to be up on Sun Briar, Exterminator went off at odds of 30–1 to the heavily favored War Cloud. Exterminator raced at the back until the field turned for home, when he launched his bid. Nearing the wire, he passed Escoba and won the Derby by a length.

=== Later career ===
When Man o' War was three, Kilmer tried to arrange a match race between him and Exterminator. Man o' War's owner, Samuel Riddle, seemed to agree, but the race never took place.

As a gelding, Exterminator competed in 99 races, winning 50 while finishing second and third 17 times each. His lifetime earnings amounted to $252,996. Beaten in the Brooklyn Handicap by Grey Lag once, Exterminator got better with age and later defeated Grey Lag in the same race. Following the retirement of trainer Henry McDaniel, in 1921 Willie Knapp took over as trainer of Exterminator and won five stakes races with the horse.

Exterminator made the last start of his career on June 21, 1924, at Dorval Park in Montreal, Canada where he ran third to Albert Bostwick Jr.'s Spot Cash in the Queen's Hotel Handicap.

=== 100-race start myth ===
Found frequently and in long-time error is the assertion that Exterminator started in 100 races. Per the research and subsequent book Exterminator (#18 in the Thoroughbred Legends series), author Eva Jolene Boyd reviewed all records of his starts and the record keeping by the Daily Racing Form and found evidence that he only had 99 official racing starts.

In addition, the local paper in Binghamton, New York, (where Exterminator spent his final years) noted upon his death in their front-page coverage that he had only 99 lifetime starts.

The 100th "start" was an exhibition run by Exterminator alone at Hawthorne Race Course in Cicero, Illinois, in September 1922. It was not for purse money, and none of his win, place or show finishes is affected by this walkover effort in a public workout.

== Retirement ==
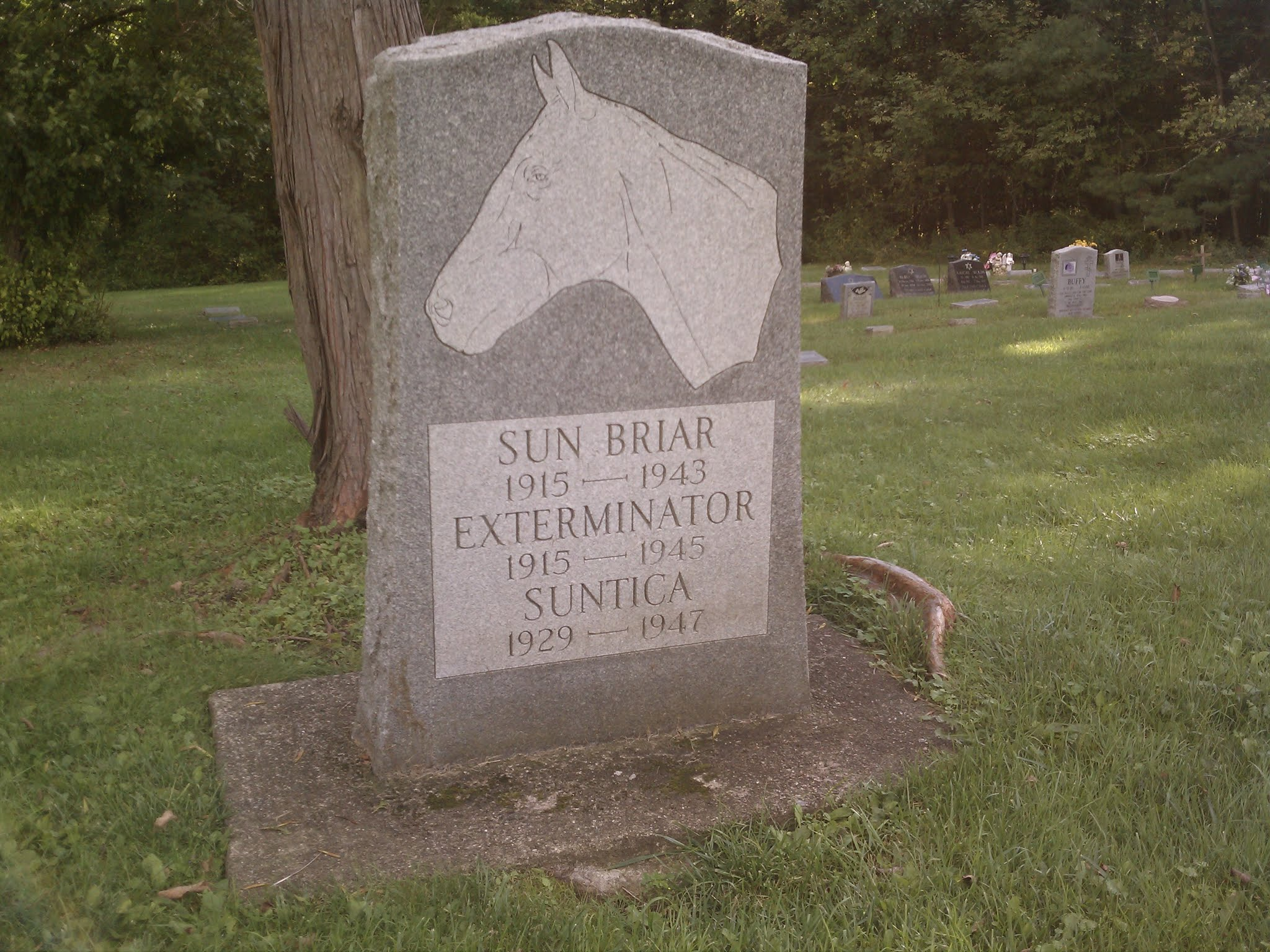
Exterminator's grave at Whispering Pines Pet Cemetery in Binghamton, NY

Racing until the age of 9, a relatively old age for a race horse, Exterminator was called by his many fans "Old Bones" or "The Galloping Hatrack" (amongst the stable lads, he was "Old Shang"). He was retired in 1924 to a life of grass and leisure, with a succession of companion ponies, all named Peanuts, at his side.

Exterminator lived in his private barn at Court Manor in Virginia until Kilmer's death in 1940, after which he was moved to Binghamton, New York. He died at the age of thirty on September 26, 1945, in his stall at Sun Briar Court, which has since been razed. At the time of his death, it was reported that he was buried beside several of the companion ponies (all named "Peanuts") although no markers exist today reflecting their grave. Exterminator's gravestone is in the former La France Pet Cemetery, now renamed Whispering Pines Pet Cemetery, Binghamton, New York, and is shared with the fellow Kilmer-owned and -raced horses Sun Briar (1915–1943) and the mare Suntica (1929–1947).

== Modern recognition ==
In 1957, Exterminator was inducted into the National Museum of Racing and Hall of Fame.

The Blood-Horse ranking of the top 100 U.S. thoroughbred champions of the 20th Century put him at #29.

His career record of 33 stakes wins has never been broken by any thoroughbred raced in North America.

A children's book was written about him: Old Bones, the Wonder Horse, written by Mildred Mastin Pace and published by McGraw-Hill in 1955 with illustrations by Wesley Dennis. It was reissued in 1983 as a paperback by the Scholastic Book Services.

Here Comes Exterminator!: The Longshot Horse, The Great War, and the Making of an American Hero, written by Eliza McGraw, was published in 2016.

== See also ==
- List of racehorses
