= Bert S. Michell =

American horse racing trainer (1881–1938)

Bert Michell
Personal information
- Born: May 21, 1881 England
- Died: October 21, 1938 (aged 57) Louisville, Kentucky, United States
- Resting place: Resthaven Memorial Cemetery, Louisville, Kentucky
- Occupation: Trainer / Owner

Horse racing career
- Sport: Horse racing
- Career wins: Not found

Major racing wins
- Hamilton Derby (1926); Belmont Futurity Stakes (1927); Churchill Downs Debutante Stakes (1927); Kentucky Jockey Club Stakes (1927); Walden Stakes (1927); Huron Handicap (1928); Jockey Club Gold Cup (1928); Lawrence Realization Stakes (1928); Saratoga Cup (1928); Coronation Cup (1929); Grey Stakes (1930); Clark Handicap (1936) International wins: Coronation Cup (1929); American Classic race wins: Kentucky Derby (1928)

Significant horses
- Reigh Count, Anita Peabody

Bernard S. "Bert" Michell (May 21, 1881 – October 21, 1938) was an American Thoroughbred horse racing trainer best known for winning the 1928 Kentucky Derby with American Horse of the Year and Hall of Fame inductee, Reigh Count.

In 1927, Michell was the trainer for Green Briar Stable when owner by Frank D. Shea of Winnipeg, Manitoba liquidated his racing operations. Michell was then hired by Chicago businessman John D. Hertz and his wife Fannie, owners of Leona Farm, near Cary, Illinois. That year he trained the Hertz's filly Anita Peabody, retrospectively voted American Champion Two-Year-Old Filly honors and whose wins included the Belmont Futurity Stakes and the Churchill Downs Debutante Stakes. However, it would be future Hall of Fame inductee Reigh Count who would bring Michell his greatest success. Reigh Count not only earned American Co-Champion Two-Year-Old Colt honors, but at age three won several prestigious races including the Kentucky Derby and was voted American Horse of the Year. In 1929, Mr. & Mrs. Hertz brought Michell and Reigh Count to race in England where he raced on turf, winning the Coronation Cup at Epsom Downs Racecourse then finished second in the Ascot Gold Cup at Ascot Racecourse.

In the fall of 1929 Michell left the Hertz stable to take over as trainer for the racing operations of Emil and Jennie Denemark of Chicago. Bert Michell raced at various tracks on the East Coast of the United States. He made his home in Miami, Florida where he met with considerable success with the Denemark's runners at Hialeah Park and Tropical Park racetracks.

Bert Michell died unexpectedly as a result of heart problems in 1938.
