= Nellie L. =

American-bred Thoroughbred racehorse

- Sire: Blenheim
- Grandsire: Blandford
- Dam: Nellie Flag
- Damsire: American Flag
- Sex: Filly
- Foaled: 1940
- Country: United States
- Colour: Bay
- Breeder: Calumet Farm
- Owner: Calumet Farm
- Trainer: Ben A. Jones
- Earnings: US$20,295

Major wins
- Kentucky Oaks (1943); Acorn Stakes (1943)

Nellie L. (foaled 1940 in Kentucky) was an American Thoroughbred racehorse bred and raced by Calumet Farm. She was sired by Blenheim and out of the mare Nellie Flag.

Trained by Ben Jones, in 1943 Nellie L. won the Kentucky Oaks and Acorn Stakes, two of the most important races for her age group.
