= Nellie Flag =

American-bred Thoroughbred racehorse

- Sire: American Flag
- Grandsire: Man o' War
- Dam: Nellie Morse
- Damsire: Luke McLuke
- Sex: Mare
- Foaled: 1932
- Country: United States
- Colour: Bay
- Breeder: Calumet Farm
- Owner: Calumet Farm
- Trainer: Burton B. Williams
- Record: 22: 6-5-1
- Earnings: US$59,665

Major wins
- Selima Stakes (1934); Arlington Futurity Trial (1934); Matron Stakes (1934); Kentucky Jockey Club Stakes (1934); Cherokee Park Purse (1935)

Awards
- American Champion Two-Year-Old Filly (1934)

Nellie Flag (1932–1953) was an American Thoroughbred racehorse who was retrospectively named the American Champion Two-Year-Old Filly of 1934. She was the first horse bred by Warren Wright's Calumet Farm to win a stakes race.

An early favorite, Nellie Flag finished fourth in the 1935 Kentucky Derby and seventh in the Preakness Stakes, the latter a race won by her dam in 1924. Following an injury, Nellie Flag was retired in mid July 1935 and stood at Calumet Farm as a broodmare where she died in 1953 at age twenty-one. She produced ten foals of which nine raced. Among her best were:

- Mar-Kell (born 1939) - American Champion Older Female Horse (1943)
- Nellie L. (born 1940) - won 1943 Kentucky Oaks, Acorn Stakes
- Sunshine Nell (born 1948) - multiple stakes wins including Barbara Fritchie Handicap, Autumn Days Handicap, Top Flight Handicap
