= Herbert J. Thompson =

American horse trainer (1881–1937)

Personal information
- Born: September 21, 1881 Detroit, Michigan, United States
- Died: November 12, 1937 (aged 56) Baltimore, Maryland, United States
- Resting place: Calvary Cemetery, Lexington, Kentucky
- Occupation: Trainer

Horse racing career
- Sport: Horse racing
- Career wins: 373

Major racing wins
- Golden Rod Stakes (1919); Clipsetta Stakes (1920); Debutante Stakes (1920); Ben Ali Handicap (1921); Blue Grass Stakes (1921, 1922, 1926); Falls City Handicap (1921); Laurel Futurity Stakes (1922, 1923); Raceland Derby (1924); Latonia Derby (1925); Juvenile Stakes (1928); National Stallion Stakes (1928); Saratoga Special Stakes (1928); American Legion Handicap (1929); Delaware Handicap (1929); Withers Stakes (1929); Arlington Classic (1929); Matron Stakes (1930, 1932); Stars and Stripes Handicap (1930); Acorn Stakes (1931); Wilson Stakes (1931); Alabama Stakes (1933); Hopeful Stakes (1933); Kentucky Oaks (1933); Test Stakes (1934); United States Hotel Stakes (1934); Champagne Stakes (1934); Walden Stakes (1936); Triple Crown race wins: Kentucky Derby (1921, 1926, 1932, 1933); Preakness Stakes (1932); Belmont Stakes (1929)

Honors
- U.S. Racing Hall of Fame (1969)

Significant horses
- Baba Kenny, Balladier, Barn Swallow, Behave Yourself, Blue Larkspur, Brokers Tip, Bubbling Over, Burgoo King
- Updated on October 16, 2018

Herbert John "Dick" Thompson (September 21, 1881 - November 12, 1937) was an American U. S. Racing Hall of Fame trainer of Thoroughbred racehorses. He was the trainer of the winning horse of the Kentucky Derby in 1921, 1926, 1932 and 1933.

In 1916, Thompson went to work as an assistant trainer to Cliff Hammon at the Idle Hour Stock Farm of Edward R. Bradley near Lexington, Kentucky. Following Hammon's death on July 28, 1918, he took temporary charge of the stable and was permanently appointed head trainer in March 1919.

Champions Trained by Thompson:

- Blue Larkspur, American Horse of the Year, 1929
- Baba Kenny, American Champion Two-Year-Old Filly, 1930
- Burgoo King, American Champion Three-Year-Old Male Horse, 1932
- Barn Swallow, American Champion Three-Year-Old Filly, 1933
- Balladier, American Champion Two-Year-Old Male Horse, 1934
