= Bed O' Roses =

American-bred Thoroughbred racehorse

Bed o' Roses
- Sire: Rosemont
- Grandsire: The Porter
- Dam: Good Thing
- Damsire: Discovery
- Sex: Filly
- Foaled: 1947
- Country: United States
- Colour: Bay
- Breeder: Alfred G. Vanderbilt II
- Owner: Sagamore Farm
- Trainer: William C. Winfrey
- Record: 46: 18-8-6
- Earnings: $383,925

Major wins
- Colleen Stakes (1949); Demoiselle Stakes (1949); Marguerite Stakes (1949); Matron Stakes (1949); National Stallion Stakes (filly division) (1949); Rancocas Stakes (1949); Selima Stakes (1949); Lawrence Realization Stakes (1950); Vineland Handicap (1951); Comely Handicap (1951); Santa Margarita Handicap (1952)

Awards
- U.S. Champion 2-Yr-Old Filly (1949); U.S. Champion Older Female Horse (1951)

Honours
- United States Racing Hall of Fame (1976); Bed O' Roses Handicap at Aqueduct Racetrack
- Last updated on September 7, 2008

Bed o' Roses (1947 – January 5, 1953) was an American thoroughbred racehorse.

Bed o' Roses was a bay filly by Rosemont out of the mare Good Thing, by Discovery, owned and bred by Alfred G. Vanderbilt II's Sagamore Farm. Trained by Bill Winfrey and ridden by Eric Guerin, she won the 1949 Grade 1 Matron Stakes for two-year-old fillies at Belmont Park plus eight other important races. At the end of the season, Bed o' Roses was named the American Champion Two-Year-Old Filly.

Racing as a three-year-old, Bed o' Roses defeated a quality field including colts in the 1 5/8 mile Lawrence Realization Stakes and finished second in the Travers Stakes and the Arlington Classic. After recovering from an injury that kept her out of racing for seven months, Bed o' Roses returned to win two more important races en route to being voted Champion Handicap Filly for the year. She continued to race at ages four and competed successfully even against males in races like the Lawrence Realization Stakes.

Wikipedia five, retiring after three races in 1952.

However, she suddenly died a few months later on January 5, 1953, from an organic disorder.

Bed o' Roses is buried at Sagamore Farm, Maryland.

In 1976, she was inducted in the National Museum of Racing and Hall of Fame.

== See also ==
- Bed O' Roses Stakes at Belmont Park, race for older fillies named in honor of Bed o' Roses
