= Benny Marinelli =

American jockey

Personal information
- Born: c. 1902 Newark, New Jersey, United States
- Died: October 22, 1927
- Occupation: Jockey

Horse racing career
- Sport: Horse racing
- Career wins: not found

Major racing wins
- Gramatan Handicap (1923); Delaware Handicap (1923); Travers Stakes (1923); Capitol Handicap (1924) American Classic Race wins: Preakness Stakes (1923)

Significant horses
- Vigil

Benny Marinelli (c. 1902 – October 22, 1927) was an American Thoroughbred horse racing jockey best known for winning the Classic Preakness Stakes in 1923.

Born in Newark, New Jersey, Benny Marinelli was working as a shipyard laborer when a friend suggested his small stature meant he might be able to make it as a jockey. Marinelli eventually decided to explore the possibility and took a job as a stable hand. After learning to ride, he embarked on a professional riding career in 1920. He rode on the east coast then went to compete at the winter meet at the Agua Caliente Racetrack in Tijuana, Mexico where he met with great success. The following year, Benny Marinelli finished second to Chick Lang for most wins by a United States jockey in 1921 with 118. In 1923, Marinelli won the Preakness Stakes aboard Walter J. Salmon's colt, Vigil and finished third in the Kentucky Derby. That same year, for owner Richard Thornton Wilson, Jr., he also guided Wilderness to victory in the prestigious Travers Stakes at Saratoga Race Course.

On May 8, 1925, Benny Marinelli was severely injured in a racing accident at Jamaica Race Course in Jamaica, New York. He suffered a fractured skull and was taken to Mary Immaculate Hospital in Jamaica where on the following Tuesday, The New York Times reported that doctors had given up on him, saying he "had practically no chance of recovery." After remaining in a coma for ten days, Marinelli regained consciousness and eventually was able to return to racing. However, in The Miami News report on his death, the newspaper said that during the two plus years after his accident he "had had many mental lapses since."

Separated from his wife for two years, and having difficulty returning to peak riding form, on October 24, 1927, a despondent Benny Marinelli checked into a New York City rooming house where he killed himself by inhaling gas. He was buried in his native Newark, New Jersey. In their reports on his death, the Reading Eagle newspaper wrote that Marinelli was twenty-five years old, but the Miami News said he was twenty-four.
