= Court Manor =

Plantation house and estate in Virginia, US

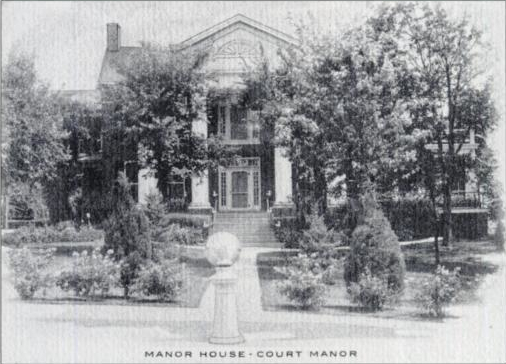
- Court Manor in the early 20th century
- Interactive map of the Court Manor area

General information
- Architectural style: Greek Revival
- Location: Rockingham County, Virginia
- Coordinates: 38°35′51″N 78°42′35″W
- Construction started: circa 1797
- Completed: circa 1800

Court Manor (built as Mooreland Hall) is an early Greek Revival plantation house and estate in Rockingham County, Virginia, located 4 miles (6.4 km) south of the town of New Market. With its stately manor house and prime location in the heart of the Shenandoah Valley, Court Manor has long been regarded as "one of the finest estates in the Valley of Virginia." The estate is situated on U.S. Route 11, which follows the route of the historic Great Wagon Road, a colonial thoroughfare connecting Philadelphia, Pennsylvania to Savannah, Georgia. The estate's landholdings include some 2,000 acres (810 hectares) of land, extending from the base of the Massanutten Mountain Ridge to about one-half mile (0.80 km) west of U.S. Route 11. The manor house (circa 1800), with its impressive Greek Revival portico, can be easily seen from the tree-lined stretch of U.S. Route 11 that passes through the heart of the estate.

== Early Estate History ==
=== Colonial Period ===
Sometime prior to the final surveying of the Fairfax Line in 1746, Thomas Fairfax, 6th Lord Fairfax of Cameron, granted a tract of land on the Great Wagon Road near Smith Creek to a Samuel Newman, who in turn sold the land in 1754 to Thomas Moore Sr., (1727–1797). The first permanent dwelling to be built on the estate was the house of Thomas Moore Sr., which was located on a knoll overlooking Smith Creek. Seeking to expand the size of his landholdings, Moore petitioned the Crown for a land grant of some 7,500 acres (3,000 hectares), which was granted by King George III eleven years later in 1765. For the next century and a half, the estate was to remain in the hands of Moore family.

=== American Revolution and later 18th century ===
In the years leading up to the American Revolution, Moore and his sons continued to expand and improve the estate. Moore's oldest son and future heir, Captain Reuben Moore Sr., left the estate at the outbreak of the American Revolutionary War to serve as an officer in the Rockingham militia under Colonel Benjamin Harrison. By the war's end in 1784, some 17 members of the Moore family were residing on the estate, both in the original house built by Thomas Moore Sr., and in a second house built by his third son, Thomas Moore Jr.

After the war, Captain Moore returned to the plantation and was elected a Commissioner of Rockingham County in 1789. It was Captain Moore who selected a wide, gently rolling tract of land near the Great Wagon Road on which to build a small log house for his family. A quarter-century later, Captain Moore's son, Reuben Moore Jr., would build Court Manor on the very spot where his father's log cabin once stood.

== Design and construction ==
Reuben Moore Jr., likely began construction of Court Manor (then known as Mooreland Hall) during the last years of the eighteenth century, following his grandfather's death in 1797. Mooreland Hall would have been a rather conventional exercise in the late colonial style if it were not for the incorporation of the impressive Greek Revival portico into the design. Supported by four massive columns of the Doric order and surmounted by a simple triangular pediment decorated with a single semi-circular window, the scale of the portico dominates the main facade of the house. The large, two-level structure was constructed using bricks fired on site by the plantation's slaves. The house contained twelve spacious rooms, each with a fireplace and with large windows, affording panoramic views of the rolling countryside with the Massanutten Mountain Ridge rising in the distance.

The grandeur of the mansion and its handsomely landscaped grounds served to match the impressive scale of the estate, which at 1,700 acres was unusually large by Valley standards. The wide, spacious lawn, dotted with large trees, slopes gently towards a spring-fed brook that arises on the grounds of the estate less than a mile away and meanders gently towards Smith Creek, which also runs through the estate. Smith Creek was used to power the plantation's mill, which produced flour and other products that were transported up and down the Great Wagon Road. The estate remained in the Moore family until 1879, when Oscar Fitz Allen Moore, grandson of Reuben Moore Jr., sold the estate to William C. & George H. Harrison.

== Twentieth Century ==
While the house was originally known as Mooreland Hall, by the early 20th century the estate came to be known as Court Manor. Over the years the original structure was expanded with various additions including a large enclosed sun porch on the southwest side of the building and an extended suite of guest rooms on the north side of the house. However, after its 1987 restoration, the front, central portion of the manor house appears today as it did when it was constructed around 1800.

In 1925, Court Manor was purchased by Willis Sharpe Kilmer, a New York entrepreneur, newspaperman, and horse breeder best known for marketing his uncle's popular medicinal tonic "Dr. Kilmer's cure-all remedy Swamp Root". The period of Kilmer's ownership of the estate saw dramatic development of the property, establishing it as one of the country's most preeminent horse studs. Exterminator, the winner of the 1918 Kentucky Derby, resided on the estate after his racing career, and Reigh Count, the winner of the 1928 Kentucky Derby, was bred and born on the estate. After Kilmer had acquired Court Manor in 1923, he had some 10,000 silver maple trees planted along the roads of the estate in memory of those lost in World War I. Today these trees are still extant and can be seen lining both sides of U.S. Route 11 as it passes through the estate.

Following Kilmer's death, Court Manor fell into a state of disrepair and slow deterioration. During the back-to-the-land movement of the 1960s and 1970s, the estate was home to a commune, and by the early 1980s, the estate's landholdings had dwindled to some 1,300 acres (5.3 km^{2}), the manor house was virtually uninhabitable, and the entire estate was in a state of ruin.

In 1985, Court Manor was acquired by North Carolina textile magnate Nicholas Wehrmann Sr., who initiated a wide-scale renovation of the manor house and estate grounds. The original section of the house and its Greek Revival portico were intact enough to be preserved in whole, but the later additions, which used inferior construction methods, had sustained far too much structural damage to be salvaged. The renovation restored the structure to its original condition and added two additional wings to the house. Also during this period the grounds of the estate were revitalized for agricultural purposes. Pastures underwent extensive renovation, historical barns were preserved, and new construction of barns, corrals, feeding systems, and miles of high tensile fence was completed. Since 1985, acquisitions by Wehrmann have restored nearly 1,000 acres (4.0 km^{2}) of land to the estate, bringing the total landholdings to some 2,250 acres (9.1 km^{2}). The estate was home to Wehrmann's herd of purebred Aberdeen Angus cattle, operated by the firm Wehrmann Angus. Nicholas Wehrman Sr. died on March 24, 2010, and the estate was sold. Court Manor is now a luxury wedding and event site.
