= Eugene James =

American jockey

Personal information
- Born: March 14, 1914 Louisville, Kentucky, United States
- Died: June 10, 1933 (aged 19) Chicago, Illinois, United States
- Resting place: Resthaven Cemetery, Louisville, Kentucky
- Occupation: Jockey

Horse racing career
- Sport: Horse racing
- Career wins: Not found

Major racing wins
- New Orleans Handicap (1931); Mardi Gras Handicap (1931); Kentucky Oaks (1931); Matron Stakes (1932) U.S. Triple Crown series: Kentucky Derby (1932); Preakness Stakes (1932

Significant horses
- Cousin Jo, Burgoo King
- Updated on March 27, 2007

Eugene D. James (March 14, 1914 - June 10, 1933) was an American Thoroughbred horse racing jockey.

Born in Louisville, Kentucky, James was a very promising young jockey who began racing in 1930 at age seventeen. According to Time magazine, he "made a sensation" in his first season of racing. Although he didn't start until June, his 138 wins that year ranked him fourth among all North American jockeys. Among his first major wins, he guided the filly Cousin Jo to victory in the 1931 Kentucky Oaks.

In 1932, Eugene James was a jockey for the prominent horseman Col. Edward R. Bradley, owner of the highly successful Idle Hour Stock Farm. Bradley's number one jockey was future U.S. Racing Hall of Fame inductee Laverne Fator. He chose to ride Brother Joe in the 1932 Kentucky Derby, leaving Eugene James to ride Burgoo King. Fator and Brother Joe finished nineteenth in a field of twenty Derby runners while James rode Burgoo King to victory. He would follow it up with a win in Preakness Stakes. The horse was not entered in the Belmont Stakes.

Unfortunately, Eugene James had problems maintaining his weight and suffered from bulimia that became so severe he had to stop riding. Though he was not racing, he was in Chicago, Illinois, in June 1933 when the season at Arlington Park and Hawthorne Race Course was in full swing. During the evening of June 10, the nineteen-year-old James and two friends went to Chicago's popular Oak Street Beach on Lake Michigan where he went swimming, and drowned.

Eugene James is buried in the Resthaven Cemetery in Louisville, Kentucky.
