= Marguerite Stakes =

- Class: Discontinued stakes
- Location: Pimlico Race Course, Baltimore, Maryland
- Inaugurated: 1945
- Race type: Thoroughbred - Flat racing

Race information
- Distance: 11/16 miles (8.5 furlongs)
- Surface: Dirt
- Track: left-handed
- Qualification: Two-year-old fillies

The Marguerite Stakes was a Thoroughbred horse race at Pimlico Race Course, in Baltimore, Maryland run between 1945 and 1965. A race on dirt for two-year-old fillies, it was created as a companion event to the Pimlico Futurity and declared at the time to be one of the richest of its kind in the United States. It was named in honor of Marguerite, one of the great broodmares in racing history. Marguerite was the dam of four significant runners including Triple Crown winner and U.S. Racing Hall of Fame inductee, Gallant Fox.

== Historical notes ==
The inaugural Marguerite Stakes was won by William L. Brann's Challadette, a daughter of the outstanding sire Challenger II whose progeny includes U.S. Racing Hall of Fame inductees Challedon and Gallorette plus the National Champion fily Bridal Flower. Challadette came into the race having already won the Maryland Futurity in which she beat her male counterparts.

Bed O' Roses easily won the 1949 Marguerite Stakes by three and a half lengths after coming from near the back of the field. She would finish the year as American Champion Two-Year-Old Filly and in 1951 would earn another National title. Bed O' Roses career put her in elite company with induction in the U.S. Racing Hall of Fame.

Marshua dominated the penultimate edition of the Marguerite Stakes winning in a new race record time by six lengths under jockey Wayne Chambers.

The Marguerite Stakes final edition was run on November 27, 1965 and was won by Swift Lady.

== Records ==
Speed record:

- 1:45.80 @ 6 furlongs - Marshua (1964), Swift Lady (1965)

Most wins by a jockey:

- 2 - Eric Guerin (1949, 1952)
- 2 - Bill Hartack (1959, 1960)

Most wins by a trainer:

- 2 - Burton B. Williams (1946, 1959)
- 2 - James P. Conway (1952, 1960)

Most wins by an owner:

- - No owner won this race more than once.

== Winners ==
Year	Winner	Age	Jockey	Trainer	Owner	Dist. (Miles)	Time	Win$
1965	Swift Lady	2	John L. Rotz	Ivan H. Parke	Harbor View Farm	11/16	1:45.80	$46,520
1964	Marshua	2	Wayne Chambers	Norman R. McLeod	Mrs. Wallace Gilroy	11/16	1:45.80	$42,516
1963	Is Ours	2	Joe Culmone	Edward I. Kelly Sr.	Brookfield Farm	11/16	1:46.60	$26,884
1962	Wise Nurse	2	Willie Harmatz	J. Elliott Burch	Brookmeade Stable (Peggy & George Cheston)	11/16	1:45.60	$
1961	Upswept	2	Braulio Baeza	Robert L. Dotter	James Cox Brady Jr.	11/16	1:46.80	$26,617
1960	Primonetta	2	Bill Hartack	James P. Conway	Darby Dan Farm	11/16	1:46.40	$22,719
1959	Airmans Guide	2	Bill Hartack	Burton B. Williams	Hugh A. Grant Sr.	11/16	1:46.60	$
1958	Toluene	2	Karl Korte	Edward J. Yowell	Harold H. Polk	11/16	1:47.40	$16,100
1957	Wendasy	2	Sidney Cole	James Radney	Keswick Stables	11/16	1:45.80	$14,200
1956	Romanita	2	John H. Skelly	Frank Sanders	Reverie Knoll Farm (Freeman Keyes)	11/16	1:45.00	$7,400
1955	Race not held							
1954	Proud Pomp	2	Frank A. Smith	Thomas J. Kelly	Ada L. Rice	11/16	1:47.40	$34,025
1953	Make A Play	2	Bennie Green	Thomas A. Kelly	Pin Oak Farm	11/16	1:47.60	$8,575
1952-1	Grecian Queen	2	Eric Guerin	James P. Conway	Florence Whitaker	11/16	1:48.00	$17,000
1952-2	Mac Bea	2	Bill Boland	Max Hirsch	King Ranch	11/16	1:47.80	$17,100
1951	No Score	2	Ovie Scurlock	Bert Mulholland	George D. Widener Jr.	11/16	1:46.80	$29,640
1950	Carolina Queen	2	Frank Bone	E. H. "Ned" Gaines	Cary C. Boshamer	11/16	1:47.20	$28,794
1949	Bed O' Roses	2	Eric Guerin	William C. Winfrey	Alfred G. Vanderbilt Jr.	11/16	1:45.80	$
1948	Alsab's Day	2	Robert J. Martin	H. C. "Red" Dodson	Mrs. Albert Sabath	11/16	1:45.00	$27,640
1947	Whirl Some	2	Douglas Dodson	Ben A. Jones	Calumet Farm	11/16	1:46.80	$28,025
1946	Cosmic Missile	2	Eddie Arcaro	Burton B. Williams	Circle M Farm (Edward S. Moore)	11/16	1:45.20	$24,640
1945	Challadette	2	Arnold Kirkland	Edward A. Christmas	William L. Brann	11/16	1:48.20	$22,095
