= Winbert F. Mulholland =

American racehorse trainer (1883–1968)

Personal information
- Born: August 27, 1883 Lexington, Kentucky
- Died: July 12, 1968 (aged 84)
- Occupation: Trainer

Horse racing career
- Sport: Horse racing
- Career wins: 800+

Major racing wins
- Jamaica Handicap (1936, 1941, 1942); Flash Stakes (1938); Sanford Stakes (1938); Saratoga Handicap (1939, 1946); Travers Stakes (1939, 1950, 1951, 1962, 1963); Wilson Stakes (1939, 1940, 1956); Massachusetts Handicap (1940); Suburban Handicap (1940, 1941); Toboggan Handicap (1940, 1941); Diana Handicap (1941, 1964); Metropolitan Handicap (1941); Fashion Stakes (1942, 1949, 1953); Youthful Stakes (1942, 1943, 1950); Great American Stakes (1943); Juvenile Stakes (1943, 1948); Test Stakes (1943,1966); Tremont Stakes (1943, 1950); Walden Stakes (1943); Jersey Derby (1944, 1962); Peter Pan Stakes (1944, 1950); Wood Memorial Stakes (1944); Butler Handicap (1946); Monmouth Handicap (1946); Narragansett Special (1946); Sysonby Handicap (1946); Acorn Stakes (1948); Black Helen Handicap (1948, 1962); Belmont Futurity Stakes (1950, 1957, 1966); Hopeful Stakes (1950, 1961, 1966); National Stallion Stakes (filly division) (1950, 1953); Saratoga Special Stakes (1950); Dwyer Stakes (1951); Marguerite Stakes (1951); William Penn Stakes (1951); Withers Stakes (1951, 1962); New York Handicap (1952); Matron Stakes (1953); Schuylerville Stakes (1953); Spinaway Stakes (1953); American Legion Handicap (1956); Sorority Stakes (1959); Bed O' Roses Handicap (1962, 1965); Delaware Handicap (1962, 1965); Gotham Stakes (1962); Lamplighter Stakes (1965); Saranac Stakes (1967) American Classic Race wins: Belmont Stakes (1962)

Honours
- United States' Racing Hall of Fame (1967)

Significant horses
- Battlefield, Eight Thirty, Evening Out, Jaipur, Jamestown, Lucky Draw, Platter, Stefanita

Winbert F. "Bert" Mulholland (August 27, 1883 - July 12, 1968) was an American Hall of Fame Thoroughbred horse racing trainer.

Born in Lexington, Kentucky, the American heartland for Thoroughbred horse breeding, Bert Mulholland began his career in racing as an exercise rider for his uncle, W. C. "Farmer Bill" Scully.

In 1923 Bert Mulholland became a foreman for the George D. Widener Jr. racing stable. He eventually became Jack Joyner's assistant trainer and in 1933 was made head trainer, a position in which he had considerable success. Racing primarily at tracks on the East Coast of the United States, among his successes he won the 1962 Belmont Stakes, the third leg of the U.S. Triple Crown series, and through 2018 he holds the record for most wins in the prestigious Travers Stakes with five.

Champions trained by Bert Mulholland:

- High Fleet - American Champion Three-Year-Old Filly (1943)
- Platter - American Champion Two-Year-Old Colt (1943)
- Stefanita - American Champion Three-Year-Old Filly (1943)
- Battlefield - American Champion Two-Year-Old Colt (1950)
- Evening Out - American Champion Two-Year-Old Filly (1953)
- Jaipur - American Champion Three-Year-Old Male Horse (1962)

In 1967, Bert Mulholland was inducted in the United States' U.S. Racing Hall of Fame. A resident of Lafayette Hill, Pennsylvania, he died at age eighty-four in 1968 at Germantown Hospital in Philadelphia.
