= Airmans Guide =

American-bred Thoroughbred racehorse

- Sire: One Count
- Grandsire: Count Fleet
- Dam: Navigating
- Damsire: Hard Tack
- Sex: Mare
- Foaled: 1957
- Country: United States
- Colour: Bay
- Breeder: W. Paul Little
- Owner: W. Paul Little; Hugh A. Grant Sr.
- Trainer: Burton B. Williams
- Rider: Bill Hartack
- Record: 20: 13-2-2
- Earnings: $315,673

Major wins
- Delaware Handicap (1961); Beldame Stakes (1961); Black-Eyed Susan Stakes (1960); Regret Handicap (1961); New Castle Stakes (1960); Suwannee River Handicap (1961); Churchill Downs Debutante Stakes (1959); Marguerite Stakes (1959)

Awards
- American Champion Older Female Horse (1961)

Airmans Guide (foaled in 1957 in Kentucky) is an American Thoroughbred racehorse. The granddaughter of Count Fleet won the Delaware Handicap and the Beldame Stakes. On May 20, 1960, Airmans Guide won the Black-Eyed Susan Stakes at Pimlico Race Course. In 1961, she was voted by the country's top sports writers as the American Champion Older Female Horse.

== Early career ==
Airmans Guide was born in 1957 in Kentucky, where she was by bred by horseman W. P. Little. She was sold at the Keeneland spring sale for two-year-olds in training for $7,500 to Hugh A. Grant Sr. In her two-year-old season, she won the Churchill Downs Debutante Stakes in Louisville, Kentucky, during the last week of June. Later that year, she won the 1 1/16 mile Marguerite Stakes at Pimlico Race Course.

== Three-year-old season ==
In her first two stakes races back as a three-year-old, Airmans Guide won the grade one Ashland Stakes at Keeneland in April over Tingle and finished third in the Kentucky Oaks to Make Sail. Her connections then entered her in the second jewel of America's de facto Filly Triple Crown, the Black-Eyed Susan Stakes. Airmans Guide beat a field of nine stakes winners, including Chalvedele Warlike. She completed the mile and a sixteenth at Pimlico Race Course in 1:46.20 under jockey Willie Harmatz.

In June, she placed second in the Acorn Stakes at one mile on the dirt at Belmont Park. Later that year, she won the New Castle Stakes at Delaware Park at nine furlongs against older mares.

== Four-year-old season ==
In 1961, Airmans Guide won the Delaware Handicap at Delaware Park under jockey Howard Grant in 2:02.4 for the 1 1/4 miles. She also won the prestigious grade one Beldame Stakes at Belmont Park in New York. After that race, her trainer Burt Williams lobbied for a division championship in the media. That year, Airmans Guide was voted American Champion Older Female Horse.

== Retirement ==
In January 1962, Airmans Guide was retired and sent to Claiborne Farm to breed.
