= Platter (horse) =

American-bred Thoroughbred racehorse

- Sire: Pilate
- Grandsire: Friar Rock
- Dam: Lets Dine
- Damsire: Jack High
- Sex: Stallion
- Foaled: 1941
- Country: United States
- Colour: Chestnut
- Breeder: George D. Widener Jr.
- Owner: George D. Widener Jr.
- Trainer: Bert Mulholland
- Record: 10: 2-3-2
- Earnings: US$60,930

Major wins
- Pimlico Futurity (1943); Walden Stakes (1943)

Awards
- DRF American Champion Two-Year-Old Colt (1943)

Platter (foaled 1941 in Kentucky) was an American Thoroughbred Champion racehorse. He is best known for his performances as a two-year-old in 1943, when he was the best American colt of his generation.

== Background ==
He was bred and raced by George D. Widener Jr., and conditioned for racing by future U.S. Racing Hall of Fame trainer Bert Mulholland,

== Racing career ==
In 1943 he won the Pimlico Futurity and the Walden Stakes under jockey Conn McCreary and was voted American Champion Two-Year-Old Colt by Daily Racing Form. The rival Turf & Sports Digest Magazine poll was topped by Occupy.

As a three-year-old, an injury kept Platter out of racing until early May in an allowance race test. The colt did not run in the 1944 Kentucky Derby but finished second to Pensive in the second leg of the U.S. Triple Crown series, the Preakness Stakes. He was injured in the Belmont Stakes and had to be pulled up.

== Stud career ==
Retired to stud duty, Platter met with limited success. Of his limited number of offspring, Platan met with the most success in racing, notably winning the 1953 Lawrence Realization Stakes and 1955 Arlington Handicap.
