= 1903 Kentucky Derby =

Horse race

29th Kentucky Derby
- Kentucky Derby
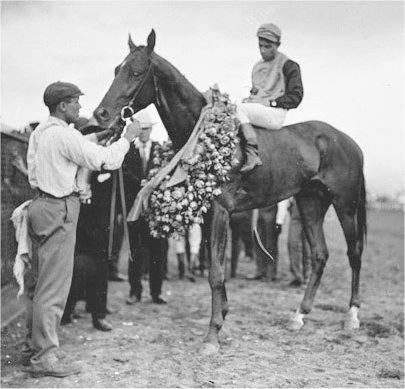
- 1903 Kentucky Derby winner Judge Himes
- Location: Churchill Downs
- Date: May 2, 1903
- Winning horse: Judge Himes
- Jockey: Hal Booker
- Trainer: John P. Mayberry
- Owner: Charles R. Ellison
- Surface: Dirt

The 1903 Kentucky Derby was the 29th running of the Kentucky Derby. The race took place on May 2, 1903, and offered a purse of $6,000.

== Full results ==
| Finished | Post | Horse | Jockey | Trainer | Owner | Time / behind |
|---|---|---|---|---|---|---|
| 1st | | Judge Himes | Harold Booker | John P. Mayberry | Charles R. Ellison | 2:09.00 |
| 2nd | | Early | Jimmy Winkfield | Patrick Dunne | Myron H. Tichenor & Co. | 3/4 |
| 3rd | | Bourbon | Richard Crowhurst | Thomas Clay McDowell | Thomas Clay McDowell | 6 |
| 4th | | Bad News | Willie Davis | French Brooks | J. H. Woodford & Buckner | 1/2 |
| 5th | | Woodlake | George Helgeson | Thomas Clay McDowell | Thomas Clay McDowell | 3 |
| 6th | | Treacy | Frank Landry | M. J. Powers | T. H. Stevens | 5 |

- Winning Breeder: Johnson N. Camden Jr.; (KY)

== Payout ==
- The winner received a purse of $4,850.
- Second place received $700.
- Third place received $300.
