= Anita Peabody =

American-bred Thoroughbred racehorse

- Sire: Luke McLuke
- Grandsire: Ultimus
- Dam: La Dauphine
- Damsire: The Tetrarch
- Sex: Filly
- Foaled: 1925
- Country: United States
- Colour: Bay
- Breeder: John D. Hertz
- Owner: Fannie Hertz
- Trainer: Bert S. Michell
- Record: 8: 7-0-1
- Earnings: US$113,105

Major wins
- Joliet Stakes (1927); Tomboy Handicap (1927); Churchill Downs Debutante Stakes (1927); Belmont Futurity Stakes (1927); Lebanon Purse (1928)

Awards
- American Champion Two-Year-Old Filly (1927)

Honours
- Anita Peabody Handicap at Arlington Park

Anita Peabody (1925–1934) was an American Champion Thoroughbred racehorse. Bred and raced by John and Fannie Hertz, she was born at their Leona Farm near Cary, Illinois. She was named after the wife of Stuyvesant Peabody, then President of the Illinois Turf Association. Anita Peabody's sire was Luke McLuke, winner of the 1914 Belmont Stakes and a son of the important but unraced Ultimus, who had been sired by Commando. Anita Peabody's dam was La Dauphine, a daughter of The Tetrarch, who was voted Britain's greatest two-year-old of the 20th century.

Trained by Bert Michell, in 1927, Anita Peabody won six of her seven starts as a two-year-old and has been retrospectively voted American Champion Two-Year-Old Filly honors. Her biggest win that year came with a victory over colts in the Belmont Futurity Stakes. In August 1928, at age three, she was retired because of injuries, having won one race that year.

Consigned to broodmare duty at Leona Farm, in February 1931 she gave birth to a son of the Hertzes' star runner, Reigh Count, who later would sire 1943 U.S. Triple Crown champion, Count Fleet.

Anita Peabody died unexpectedly of an infection at Leona Farm on August 27, 1934, having produced three foals.
