= Reigh Count =

American-bred Thoroughbred racehorse

- Sire: Sunreigh
- Grandsire: Sundridge
- Dam: Contessina
- Damsire: Count Schomberg
- Sex: Stallion
- Foaled: 1925
- Country: United States
- Colour: Chestnut
- Breeder: Willis Sharpe Kilmer
- Owner: Fannie Hertz. Racing colours: Yellow, black circle on sleeves, yellow cap.
- Trainer: Henry McDaniel; Bert S. Michell
- Record: 27: 12-4-0
- Earnings: $180,795

Major wins
- Walden Stakes (1927); Kentucky Jockey Club Stakes (1927); Huron Handicap (1928); Saratoga Cup (1928); Lawrence Realization (1928); Miller Stakes (1928); Jockey Club Gold Cup (1928); Coronation Cup (1929); U.S. Triple Crown series: Kentucky Derby (1928)

Awards
- U.S. Champion 2-Yr-Old Colt (1927); U.S. Champion 3-Yr-Old Colt (1928); United States Horse of the Year (1928)

Honours
- United States Racing Hall of Fame (1978); Reigh Count Drive in Florence, Kentucky

Reigh Count (April 13, 1925–April 8, 1948) was an American Hall of Fame Thoroughbred racehorse who won the 1928 Kentucky Derby and the 1929 Coronation Cup in England.

Reigh Count was bred by Willis Sharpe Kilmer and foaled at Court Manor near New Market, Virginia.

== Racing career ==
=== 1927: two-year-old season ===
He raced well as a two-year-old, winning four of fourteen races. He was initially trained by Hall of Fame inductee Henry McDaniel but after being sold to Fannie Hertz, by Bert S. Michell. A controversial finish in the Futurity Stakes at Belmont Park (the richest race in the United States at the time) possibly deprived him of another win. Just before the finish line, he held the lead. But due to either misjudgment of the finish line by his jockey or (possibly) intentional instructions by his owner, his stablemate Anita Peabody won by the barest of margins. The next day's New York Times photo captured the jockeys, side-by-side, looking at each other at the wire.

=== 1928: three-year-old season ===
At age three Reigh Count was the dominant horse in America, winning six races including the 1928 Kentucky Derby. Jockey Chick Lang's victory three years earlier in the Queen's Plate made him the only Canadian jockey in history to win the most prestigious race both in Canada and in the United States. An injury kept Reigh Count out of both the Preakness and Belmont Stakes. However, later that summer in the Lawrence Realization, he defeated Preakess winner Victorian. That fall he took on and defeated older horses in the Jockey Club Gold Cup, which had a field including Chance Shot, Display, and Diavolo. Reigh Count's performances in 1928 earned him unofficial United States Horse of the Year honors. Although no formal award was made he was recognised in contemporary sources as "the champion racehorse of the year"

=== 1929: four-year-old season ===
In 1929 Reigh Count was shipped to race in England at age four, with the Ascot Gold Cup as his principal objective and attracted considerable attention in the British press. In an interview in New York, Hertz announced that he believed Reigh Count to be the best horse in the world and that "he is over there to prove it". Reigh Count began his British campaign with disappointing efforts at Lingfield and Newbury where he was apparently unsuited by the cold weather and straight tracks. while his owner's "dazzling" racing silks provoked amusement among British racegoers. In Coronation Cup at Epsom on 5 June however Reigh Count recorded an important victory when he led in the last strides to win the race by a short head from Athford. Later in the month he contested the Gold Cup at Royal Ascot and finished second to Invershin. His improving British form led to some regret when he was returned to the United States shortly afterwards. TIME magazine reported on December 16, 1929 that his owner had turned down an offer of $1 million for Reigh Count, saying "I think a fellow who would pay $1,000,000 for a horse ought to have his head examined, and the fellow who turned it down must be absolutely unbalanced". Had the offer been accepted, it would have been by far the largest amount ever paid for a race horse.

== Stud record ==
Retired to stand at stud at his owner's Stoner Creek Stud in Paris, Kentucky, Reigh Count produced 22 graded stakes race winners including:

- Count Arthur (b. 1932) - won the Manhattan Handicap and the Jockey Club Gold Cup
- Count Fleet (b. 1940) - the 1943 U.S. Triple Crown champion, U.S. Racing Hall of Fame inductee
- Triplicate (b. 1941) - won the Hollywood Gold Cup and the San Juan Capistrano Handicap
- Adonis (b. 1942) - won the Travers Stakes

== Sire line tree ==
Extended content
- Reigh Count
  - Count Arthur
  - Count Morse
  - Count Stone
  - Count Fleet
    - Count-A-Bit
    - Ennobled
    - Fleeting Star
    - Be Fleet
    - Beau Gar
      - Beau Purple
      - High Patches
    - County Delight
      - Caledon Beau
      - Lake Delaware
    - Auditing
      - Mr Right
    - Count Turf
      - Manassa Mauler
    - Counterpoint
      - Harmonizing
      - Dotted Swiss
      - Counterate
      - Munden Point
      - Fast Count
      - Over The Counter
    - Comte De Grasse
      - Fair Account
    - Count Flame
      - Roving Minstrel
    - One Count
      - Sharp Count
      - Water Prince
        - Duck Dance
      - Handsome Boy
        - Arbees Boy
      - Beau Marker
    - By Zeus
    - Straight Face
    - Portersville
    - Count Of Honor
    - General Arthur
  - Do-Reigh-Mi
  - Triplicate
    - Better Bee
      - Abes Hope
      - Better Sea
      - Del Bee
        - Sugar Bee
      - Bee Bee Bee
  - Adonis
  - Count Speed
    - Eddie Schmidt

== Pedigree ==
Pedigree of Reigh Count
Sire Sunreigh	Sundridge	Amphion	Speculum or Rosebery
Sire Sunreigh	Sundridge	Amphion	Suicide
Sire Sunreigh	Sundridge	Sierra	Springfield
Sire Sunreigh	Sundridge	Sierra	Sanda
Sire Sunreigh	Sweet Briar	St Frusquin*	St Simon*
Sire Sunreigh	Sweet Briar	St Frusquin*	Isabel*
Sire Sunreigh	Sweet Briar	Presentation	Orion
Sire Sunreigh	Sweet Briar	Presentation	Dubia
Dam Contessina	Count Schomberg	Aughrim	Xenophon
Dam Contessina	Count Schomberg	Aughrim	Lashaway
Dam Contessina	Count Schomberg	Clonavarn	Baliol
Dam Contessina	Count Schomberg	Clonavarn	Expectation
Dam Contessina	Pitti	St Frusquin*	St Simon*
Dam Contessina	Pitti	St Frusquin*	Isabel*
Dam Contessina	Pitti	Florence	Wisdom
Dam Contessina	Pitti	Florence	Enigma

* Reigh Count is inbred 3S x 3D to the stallion St Frusquin, meaning that he appears third generation on the sire side of his pedigree and third generation on the dam side of his pedigree.
