= Burgoo King =

American-bred Thoroughbred racehorse

- Sire: Bubbling Over
- Grandsire: North Star
- Dam: Minawand
- Damsire: Lonawand
- Sex: Stallion
- Foaled: 1929
- Country: United States
- Colour: Chestnut
- Breeder: H. N. Davis & Idle Hour Stock Farm
- Owner: Edward R. Bradley; Silks: white, green hoops, white sleeves, green cap
- Trainer: Herbert J. Thompson
- Record: 21: 8-2-3
- Earnings: $110,940

Major wins
- American Classic Race wins: Kentucky Derby (1932); Preakness Stakes (1932)

Awards
- U.S. Co-Champion 3-Yr-Old Colt (1932)
- Last updated on March 19, 2007

Burgoo King (1929–1946) was an American Thoroughbred racehorse who won the first two legs of the U.S. Triple Crown series but who did not run in the final race, the Belmont Stakes.

== Background ==
Owned by Colonel Edward R. Bradley and foaled at his renowned Idle Hour Stock Farm near Lexington, Kentucky, Burgoo King was named for a local grocer famous for his burgoo stew. Out of the mare Minawand, he was sired by Bradley's 1926 Kentucky Derby winner, Bubbling Over.

Burgoo King was trained by future U.S. Racing Hall of Fame inductee "Derby Dick" Thompson.

== Racing career ==
=== 1931: two-year-old season ===
Although he won four of his twelve starts in 1931, Burgoo King's best result in several major races for American two-year-olds was a third-place finish in the Pimlico Futurity.

=== 1932: three-year-old season ===
At age three, Burgoo King was unplaced in the Withers Stakes and for the Kentucky Derby was not considered a significant contender. He was sent off at betting odds of close to 6:1 behind the favored Hopeful Stakes winner Tick On. The colt was ridden by 19-year-old Eugene James, an up-and-coming jockey from Louisville, Kentucky, whom Time magazine said had "made a sensation" in his 1931 racing season. Nonetheless, at the time, Colonel Bradley's top jockey was Laverne Fator, who had first choice of any of Idle Hour's horses. Fator chose to ride the colt Brother Joe, leaving the lightly regarded Burgoo King for young James.

The 1932 Kentucky Derby had a field of twenty starters, but Burgoo King got away cleanly. Shortly into the race stablemate Brother Joe pulled up lame. Although Burgoo King raced two wide with another horse behind the frontrunner, he made a strong move on the backstretch to take the lead and in the homestretch pulled away to win easily by three lengths. For Colonel Bradley, it marked a record third Kentucky Derby win.

Derby favorite Tick On finished sixth but in the ensuing Preakness Stakes he provided fierce competition with Burgoo King and jockey Eugene James beating Tick On by a head. A year after his two Classic wins, James died in a drowning accident in Lake Michigan. Winning the 1932 Belmont Stakes would have made Burgoo King the third U.S. Triple Crown champion in history. Two years earlier, the term "Triple Crown" had been coined by a sportswriter amid the hoopla surrounding Gallant Fox. The 1932 Belmont was run on June 4 but it has been reported that the colt was not eligible due to a failure on the part of his handlers to file all of the required paperwork. However, according to other sources, he twisted an ankle before the race and could not run. Another source claims that on June 11, while training for the American Derby in Chicago, Burgoo King bowed a tendon and would not race again for almost two years.

That Burgoo King did not race from around mid-1932 until mid-1934 is a fact, but the National Sporting Library's Thoroughbred Heritage website says that he was referred to as being "far from robust" by turf writers. As such, he may have had a minor ankle injury that kept him out of the Belmont but would have healed enough in time for the American Derby a week later. Or, his handlers may simply have chosen not to risk injuring the suddenly valuable colt over the Belmont's 1 1/2 mile distance, the longest and most grueling of the Triple Crown races. Instead, they may have opted to go to the then-very prestigious American Derby, which was run at the Kentucky Derby distance of 1 1/4 miles. Two years later the handlers for 1934 Kentucky Derby winner Cavalcade, who lost the Preakness by a nose, chose to skip the Belmont and compete in the American Derby instead.

=== Later racing career ===
Burgoo King's injury was a serious one and he did not return to racing until May 1934. At a time when more than one organization selected annual thoroughbred champions, despite his shortened campaign, Burgoo King still shared U.S. Three-Year-Old Co-Champion honors with Faireno. As a five-year-old horse in 1934, he returned to have a successful campaign in minor races, winning two of his five starts, along with one second-place finish and a third in each of his other two races.

== Stud record ==
Retired to Idle Hour Stock Farm, Burgoo King met with modest success at stud. Although none of his progeny achieved his race or earnings success, he did produce six stakes race winners. Burgoo King was eventually sent to Darby Dan Farm in Columbus, Ohio, where he died in 1946. He is buried there in the farm's equine cemetery.

== Breeding ==
Pedigree of Burgoo King
Sire Bubbling Over ch. 1923	North Star ch. 1914	Sunstar	Sundridge
Sire Bubbling Over ch. 1923	North Star ch. 1914	Sunstar	Doris
Sire Bubbling Over ch. 1923	North Star ch. 1914	Angelica	St. Angelo
Sire Bubbling Over ch. 1923	North Star ch. 1914	Angelica	Fota
Sire Bubbling Over ch. 1923	Beaming Beauty bay 1917	Sweep	Ben Brush
Sire Bubbling Over ch. 1923	Beaming Beauty bay 1917	Sweep	Pink Domino
Sire Bubbling Over ch. 1923	Beaming Beauty bay 1917	Bellisario	Hippodrome
Sire Bubbling Over ch. 1923	Beaming Beauty bay 1917	Bellisario	Biturica
Dam Minawand ch. 1916	Lonawand brown 1907	Cupbearer	Orme
Dam Minawand ch. 1916	Lonawand brown 1907	Cupbearer	Kissing Cup
Dam Minawand ch. 1916	Lonawand brown 1907	St. Flora	St. Florian
Dam Minawand ch. 1916	Lonawand brown 1907	St. Flora	Barbara
Dam Minawand ch. 1916	Mintless bay 1906	Minting	Lord Lyon
Dam Minawand ch. 1916	Mintless bay 1906	Minting	Mint Sauce
Dam Minawand ch. 1916	Mintless bay 1906	Gorseberry	Crowberry
Dam Minawand ch. 1916	Mintless bay 1906	Gorseberry	Sardonis
