= 1918 Kentucky Derby =

Horse race

44th Kentucky Derby
- Kentucky Derby
- Grade I stakes race
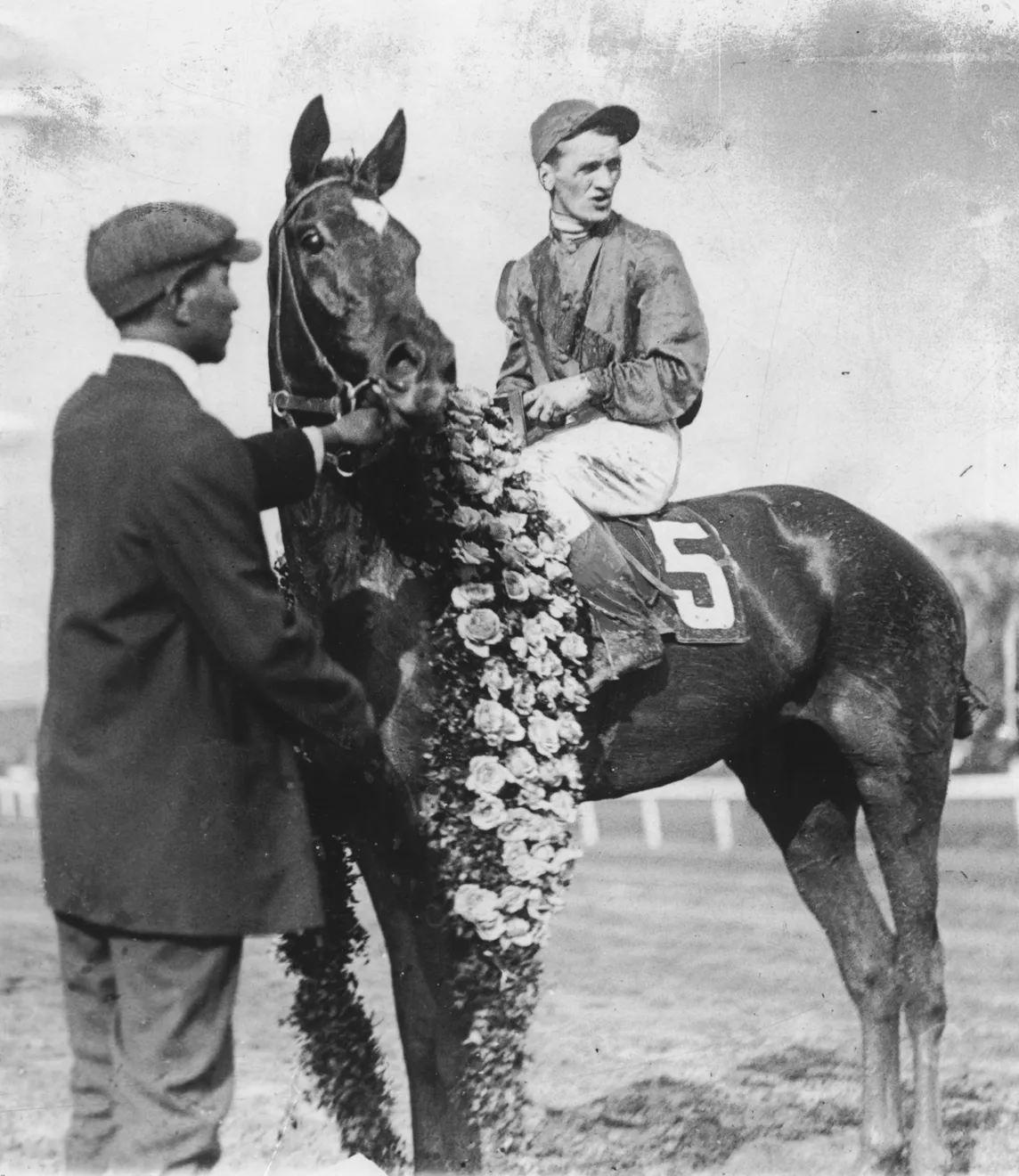
- Exterminator, winner of the 1918 Kentucky Derby
- Location: Churchill Downs
- Date: May 11, 1918
- Winning horse: Exterminator
- Jockey: Willie Knapp
- Trainer: Henry McDaniel
- Owner: Willis Sharpe Kilmer
- Surface: Dirt

The 1918 Kentucky Derby was the 44th running of the Kentucky Derby. The race took place May 11, 1918. Exterminator went off at odds of 30–1 to the heavily favored War Cloud. Exterminator raced at the back until the field turned for home, when he launched his bid. Nearing the wire, he passed Escoba and won the Derby by a length.

== Full results ==
| Finished | Post | Horse | Jockey | Trainer | Owner | Time / behind |
|---|---|---|---|---|---|---|
| 1st | | Exterminator | Willie Knapp | Henry McDaniel | Willis Sharpe Kilmer | 2:10.8 |
| 2nd | | Escoba | Joe Notter | John S. Ward | Kenneth S. Alexander | |
| 3rd | | Viva America | William Warrington | W. N. Potts | C. T. Worthington | |
| 4th | | War Cloud | Johnny Loftus | Walter B. Jennings | A. Kingsley Macomber | |
| 5th | | Lucky B | John McCabe | Oswald A. Bianchi | Oswald A. Bianchi | |
| 6th | | Jas. T. Clark | John Morys | Louis Tauber | John W. Schorr | |
| 7th | | Sewell Combs | Loyd L. Gentry Sr. | John C. Gallaher | Gallaher Bros. | |
| 8th | | American Eagle | Earl Sande | George Denney | Thomas Clay McDowell | |

- Winning Breeder: F. D. "Dixie" Knight; (KY)

== Payout ==
| Post | Horse | Win | Place | Show |
|---|---|---|---|---|
| 5 | Exterminator | $ 61.20 | 23.10 | 12.40 |
| 1 | Escoba | | 4.90 | 4.60 |
| 2 | Viva America | | | 13.20 |

- The winner received a purse of $15,000.
- Second place received $2,500.
- Third place received $1,000.
- Fourth place received $275.
