= Mar-Kell =

American-bred Thoroughbred racehorse

- Sire: Blenheim
- Grandsire: Blandford
- Dam: Nellie Flag
- Damsire: American Flag
- Sex: Filly
- Foaled: 1939
- Country: United States
- Color: Bay
- Breeder: Calumet Farm
- Owner: Calumet Farm
- Trainer: Ben A. Jones
- Record: 53: 17-17-3
- Earnings: US$84,365

Major wins
- Spinaway Stakes (1941); Beldame Handicap (1943); Top Flight Handicap (1943); War Admiral Purse (1943); Ruthless Purse (1943); Evening Handicap (1944); Hephaiston Purse (1944)

Awards
- American Champion Older Female Horse (1943)
- Last updated on May 30, 2021

Mar-Kell (1939–1966) was an American Champion Thoroughbred racehorse. Her dam was the 1934 American Champion Two-Year-Old Filly Nellie Flag, and her sire was the 1930 Epsom Derby winner Blenheim, who had been imported to the United States in 1937 by a syndicate that included Mar-Kell's breeder, Calumet Farm.

== Background ==
Mar-Kell was bred in Kentucky and was raced by Calumet Farm for four years, from age two through five. Trained by future U.S. Racing Hall of Fame inductee Ben Jones, as a four-year-old, Mar-Kell was named American Champion Older Female Horse of 1943.

== Racing career ==
Racing at age two, Mar-Kell's most important win came in the Spinaway Stakes at Saratoga Race Course. At age three her best effort was runner-up to Star Copy in the Lady Baltimore Handicap at Pimlico Race Course but as a four-year-old Mar-Kell came into her own, earning 1943 National Champion honors in her class. Mar-Kell's most significant wins that year came at Belmont Park in the Top Flight and Beldame Handicaps. While not a stakes event, Mar-Kell won Belmont's Ruthless Purse, a race named for the U.S. Racing Hall of Fame filly Ruthless who won the 1867 Belmont Stakes in its inaugural running. Mar-Kell's win was very noteworthy in that she beat the heavily favored Vagrancy by eight lengths and the third-place finisher by more than 14 lengths.

== A Calumet broodmare ==
Following her retirement to broodmare duty, Mar-Kell produced the Calumet runner Mark-Ye-Well. Foaled in 1949, the colt won multiple important stakes races, including the Arlington Classic, American Derby, Lawrence Realization Stakes, and Santa Anita Handicap.

Mar-Kell died in 1966 at age twenty-seven and was buried in the equine cemetery at Calumet Farm.
