= Sagamore Farm =

Thoroughbred breeding farm and training ground in Baltimore County, Maryland, US

Coordinates: 39°29′29″N 76°46′24″W

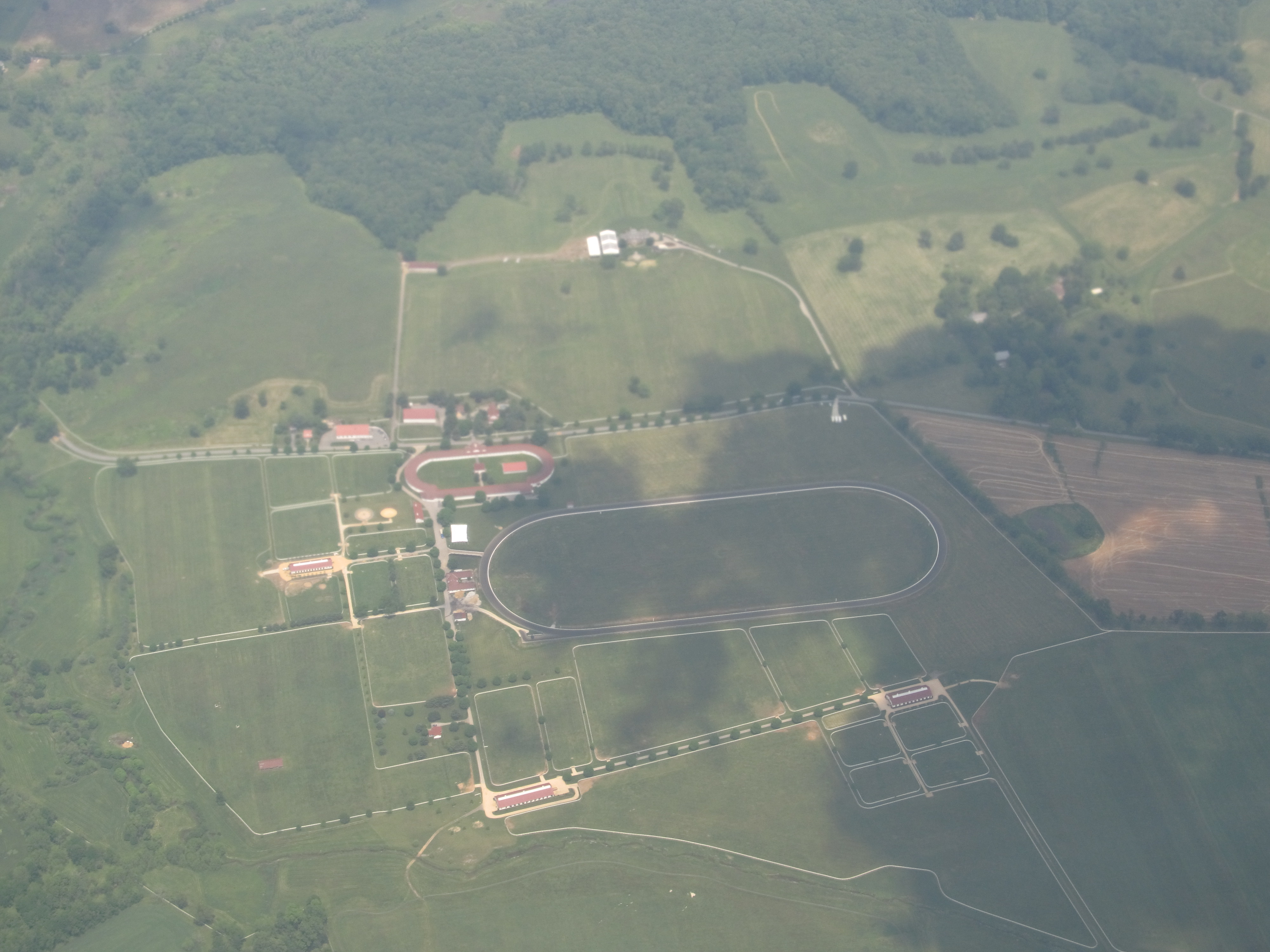
- Sagamore Farm, Maryland
- Type: Formerly Thoroughbred Horse breeding & training Farm
- Industry: Thoroughbred Horse racing
- Founded: 1925
- Founder: Isaac Edward Emerson
- Headquarters: Reisterstown, Maryland, United States
- Key people: Alfred G. Vanderbilt II, owner until 1986; Kevin Plank, current owner
- Website: sagamorefarm.com

Sagamore Farm is an American former Thoroughbred horse breeding farm on Belmont Avenue in Reisterstown, Maryland.

== History ==
Established in 1925, Sagamore Farm was owned by Isaac Edward Emerson of Baltimore, who assembled the property as a gift for his daughter, Margaret. After his death and on his instructions, Margaret Emerson Vanderbilt passed it to her son Alfred G. Vanderbilt, Jr. for his twenty-first birthday. As a member of New York's wealthy Vanderbilt family, Alfred would become the owner and president of Baltimore's Pimlico Race Course. He also became President of Belmont Park. As well, he served at various times as head of the New York Racing Association and the United States Jockey Club.

In 1938, Vanderbilt staged the famous match race between Seabiscuit and War Admiral at Pimlico. In 1941, Vanderbilt teamed up with Walter P. Chrysler Jr. and other investors to acquire for breeding services the 1935 English Triple Crown winner Bahram from the Aga Khan III. Bahram stood at stud at Sagamore Farm then was sent to Chrysler's North Wales Stud in Warrenton, Virginia. In 1966, Vanderbilt was part of another syndicate that bought Kentucky Derby and Preakness Stakes winner Kauai King who would also stand at stud at Sagamore Farm.

The Vanderbilt/Sagamore Farm best known racehorses were Discovery, Bed o'Roses, and Native Dancer, all of whom were inducted into the National Museum of Racing and Hall of Fame. Native Dancer is considered one of the greatest race horses of all time.

Vanderbilt sold the farm to developer James Ward in 1986. In 2007 Maryland native Kevin Plank, CEO of Under Armour apparel company, bought the farm with a long-term plan for a major restoration. Equestrian architect, John Blackburn of Blackburn Architects in Washington, D.C. is renovating the farm that includes a historic 90-stall training barn with a quarter-mile interior track. The facilities are across the way of the Maryland Stallion Station. The back of the facilities are visible from Tufton Avenue.

On November 5, 2010, a Sagamore Farm owned racemare named Shared Account won the $2 million Breeders' Cup Filly & Mare Turf. She defeated 2009 winner Midday, one of the top-rated horses in the world.

On November 5, 2020, Sagamore Farm announced that they were shifting from breeding and training champion Thoroughbred race horses to growing grains for the Sagamore Spirit brand, which already uses limestone-filtered spring water from Sagamore Farm to distill its line of signature award-winning Maryland rye whiskey.

== Racing silks ==
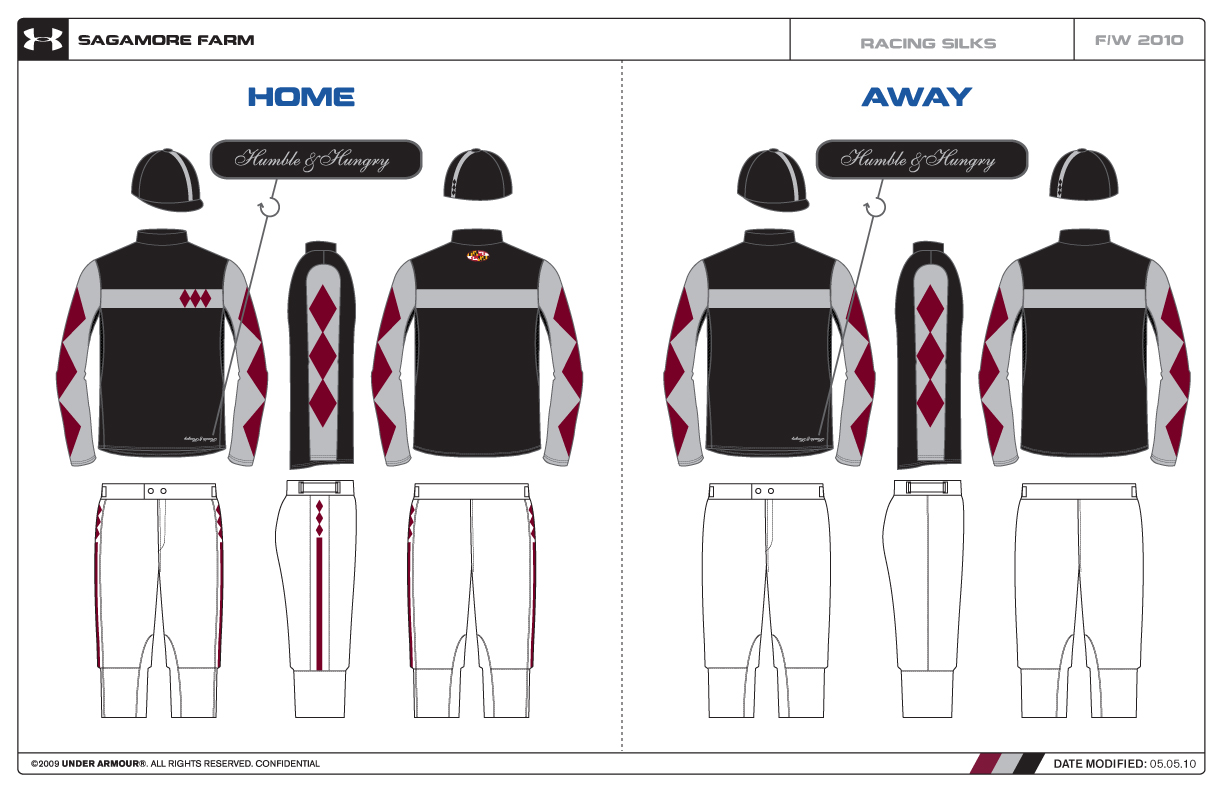
