= Judge Himes =

American Thoroughbred racehorse

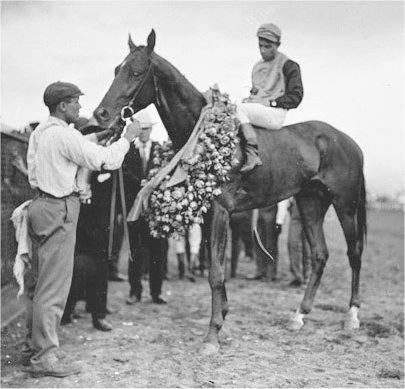
- Judge Himes in 1903.
- Sire: Esher
- Grandsire: Claremont
- Dam: Lullaby
- Damsire: Longfellow
- Sex: Stallion
- Foaled: 1900
- Country: United States
- Color: Chestnut
- Breeder: Johnson N. Camden Jr.
- Owner: 1) Charles R. Ellison; 2) Phill Chin
- Trainer: John P. Mayberry
- Record: 104: 18-14-22
- Earnings: $27,995

Major wins
- Hawthorne Handicap (1903); Oak Park Handicap (1903); Endurance Handicap (1903); Whirlpool Stakes (1905) American Classic Race wins: Kentucky Derby (1903)

Judge Himes (1900 – after 1908) was an American Thoroughbred racehorse that was foaled in Kentucky and was the winner of the 1903 Kentucky Derby. He was a chestnut colt sired by imported Esher out of the mare Lullaby (by the great racer Longfellow). He was bred at Hartland Stud in Kentucky and was bought by Charles Ellison in September 1901 for $1,700.

Judge Himes also won the Chicago Hawthorne Handicap, Whirlpool Stakes, and Oak Park Handicap and raced until he was five years old. He was sold in New Orleans to turfman Phill Chin in March 1906 for use as a breeding stallion. Judge Himes was listed in a 1908 advertisement for the Heartland Stud Farm. He was auctioned on March 23, 1908, at Callahan's Stables in Warrenton, Virginia, and sired a few half-bred foals for the farm.

== Pedigree ==
Pedigree of Judge Himes
Sire Esher 1883	Claremont 1872	Blair Athol	Stockwell
Sire Esher 1883	Claremont 1872	Blair Athol	Blink Bonny
Sire Esher 1883	Claremont 1872	Coimbra	Kingston
Sire Esher 1883	Claremont 1872	Coimbra	Calcavella
Sire Esher 1883	Una 1866	Dusk	Wild Dayrell
Sire Esher 1883	Una 1866	Dusk	Circassian Maid
Sire Esher 1883	Una 1866	Conjecture	Augur
Sire Esher 1883	Una 1866	Conjecture	Bran Mare
Dam Lullaby 1884	Longfellow 1867	Leamington	Faugh-a-Ballagh
Dam Lullaby 1884	Longfellow 1867	Leamington	Pantaloon Mare
Dam Lullaby 1884	Longfellow 1867	Nantura	Brawners Eclipse
Dam Lullaby 1884	Longfellow 1867	Nantura	Quiz
Dam Lullaby 1884	Lady Richards 1872	War Dance	Lexington
Dam Lullaby 1884	Lady Richards 1872	War Dance	Reel
Dam Lullaby 1884	Lady Richards 1872	Lucretia	Yorkshire
Dam Lullaby 1884	Lady Richards 1872	Lucretia	Boston Mare
