= Willis Sharpe Kilmer =

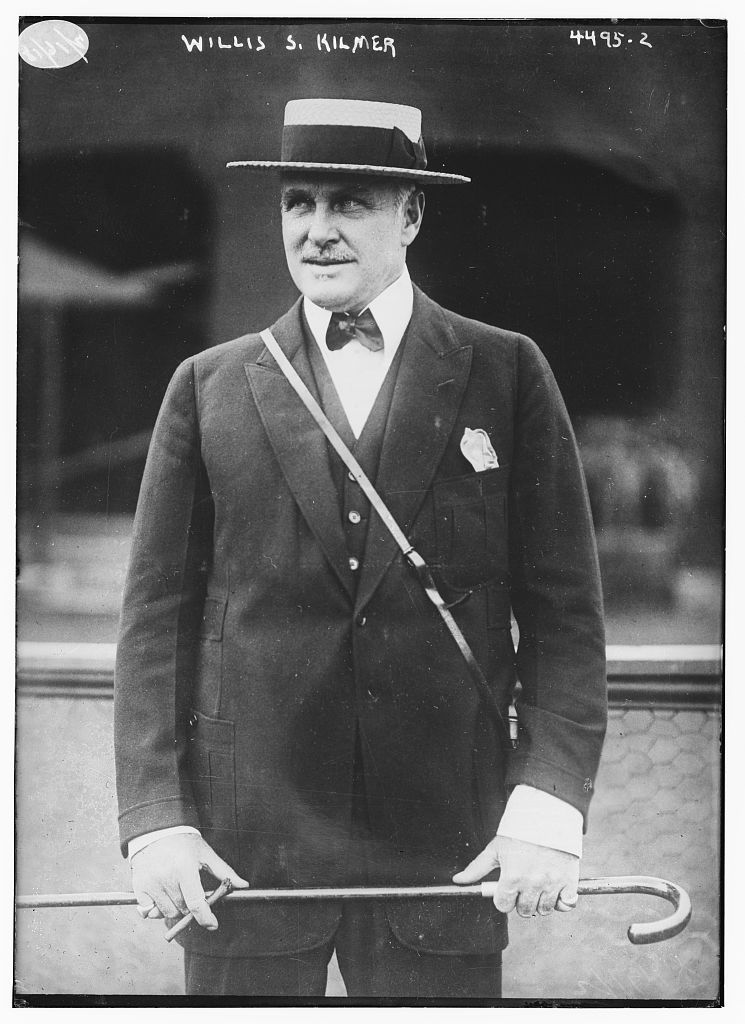
- Kilmer in 1918
- Born: October 18, 1869; Brooklyn, New York
- Died: July 12, 1940 (aged 70); Binghamton, New York
- Education: Cornell University
- Occupations: advertising, newspaperman, horse breeder, and patent medicine entrepreneur
- Parent(s): Jonas M. Kilmer, Julia Sharpe Kilmer
- Relatives: Dr. Sylvester Andral Kilmer, Joyce Kilmer

Signature
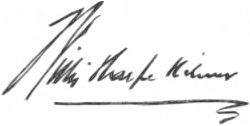

Willis Sharpe Kilmer (October 18, 1869 – July 12, 1940) was a patent medicine manufacturer, newspaperman, horse breeder, and entrepreneur.

== Biography ==
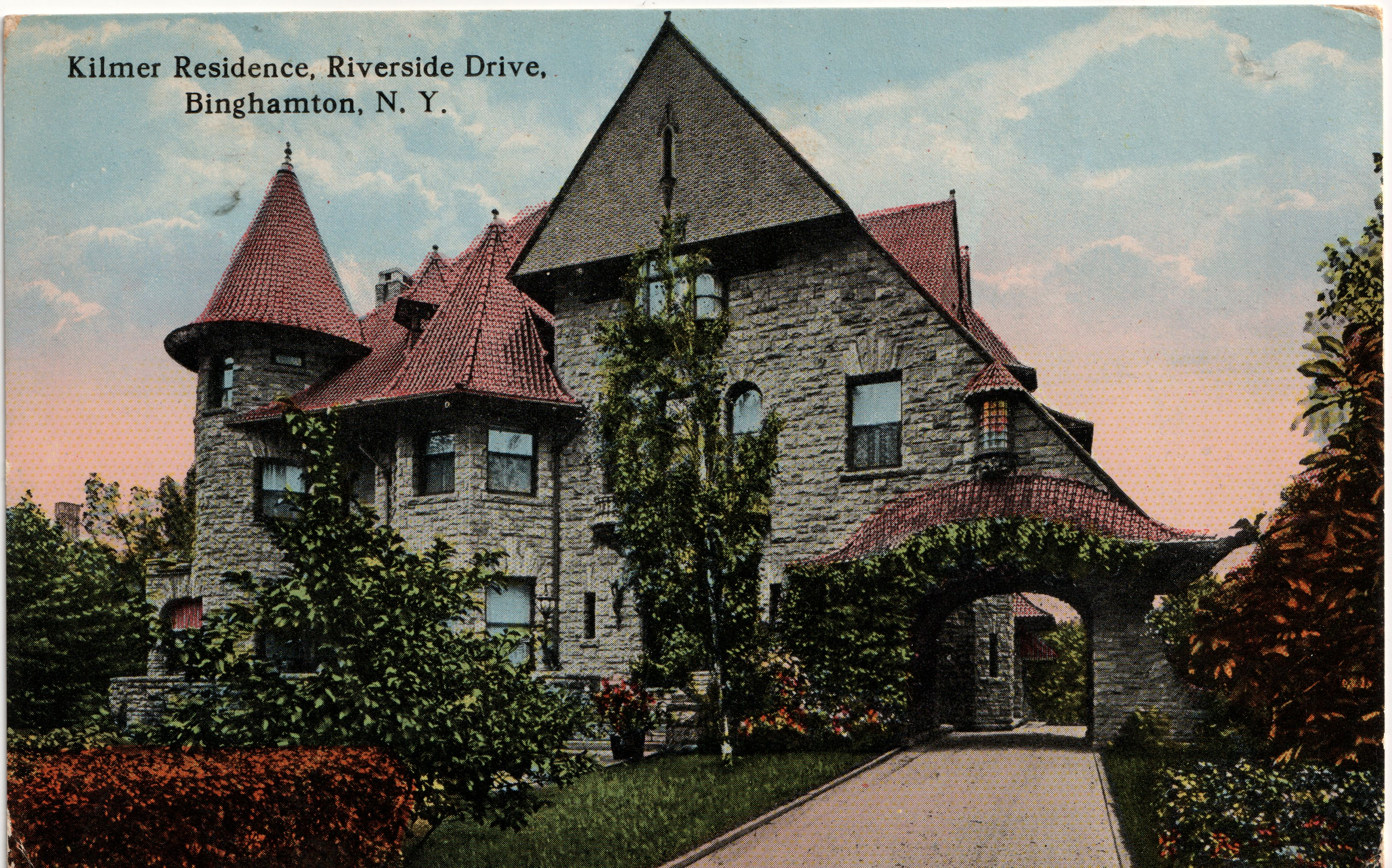
Kilmer Residence, Riverside Drive, Binghamton NY

Willis Kilmer, son of Jonas M. Kilmer and Julia E. Sharpe, was a marketing pioneer, newspaperman, and horse breeder. Born in Brooklyn, New York, he graduated from Cornell University in 1890. He was perhaps best known for advertising and promoting his uncle's Swamp Root patent medicine formula until it became a household name.

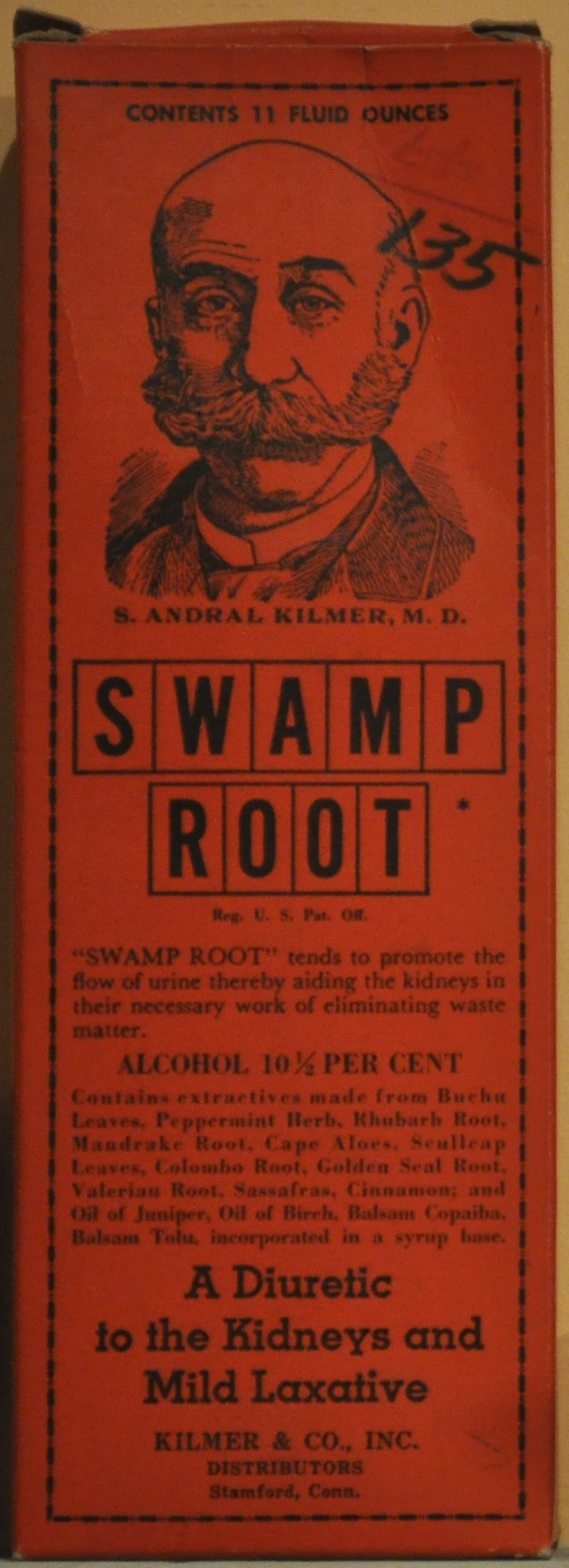
Kilmer's Swamp Root 02

Dr. S. Andral Kilmer (1840–1924) developed the Swamp Root formula and began selling it around 1878. Three years later, Dr. Kilmer's brother Jonas (1843–1912) arrived from New York City to help run the fast-growing business. In 1892, Jonas bought out his brother and brought in his son Willis to direct marketing and advertising. Continued success led them to construct the six-story Kilmer Building at Lewis and Chenango Sts in downtown Binghamton, NY as their manufacturing and business headquarters in 1903. The Swamp Root formulation fell out of favor after the advent of the 1906 Pure Food and Drug Act, which resulted in the federal government imposing testing and labeling requirements on a variety of products, including patent medicines with dubious claims.

Kilmer mausoleum in 2009

The Kilmer brothers' Swamp Root formula was regarded as fraud and quackery by critics. Medical health experts noted that it was being advertised under false pretenses, the formula was potentially dangerous and there was no evidence it could cure kidney or liver disease.

The decline in the patent medicine business led Kilmer to branch out into other businesses. He was extensively involved in real estate, owning a landmark family mansion in Binghamton, NY, constructing the twelve story Press Building in downtown Binghamton as a home for another new business he created, The Binghamton Press Co., building several other less-prominent buildings in downtown Binghamton, and three racing stables and estates: Sun Briar Court in Binghamton, Court Manor in the Shenandoah Valley of Virginia, and Remlik, on the banks of Virginia's Rappahannock River. Kilmer's private yacht Remlik (the name being Kilmer spelled backwards) was purchased by the US Navy during World War I and converted into the USS Remlik (SP-157) armed patrol vessel.

Kilmer died from pneumonia in Binghamton on July 12, 1940, having amassed a fortune of some $15 million, mostly from the sale of the patent medicine Swamp Root tonic. After his death, Kilmer was interred at a mausoleum in Floral Park Cemetery in the Binghamton suburb of Johnson City, NY.

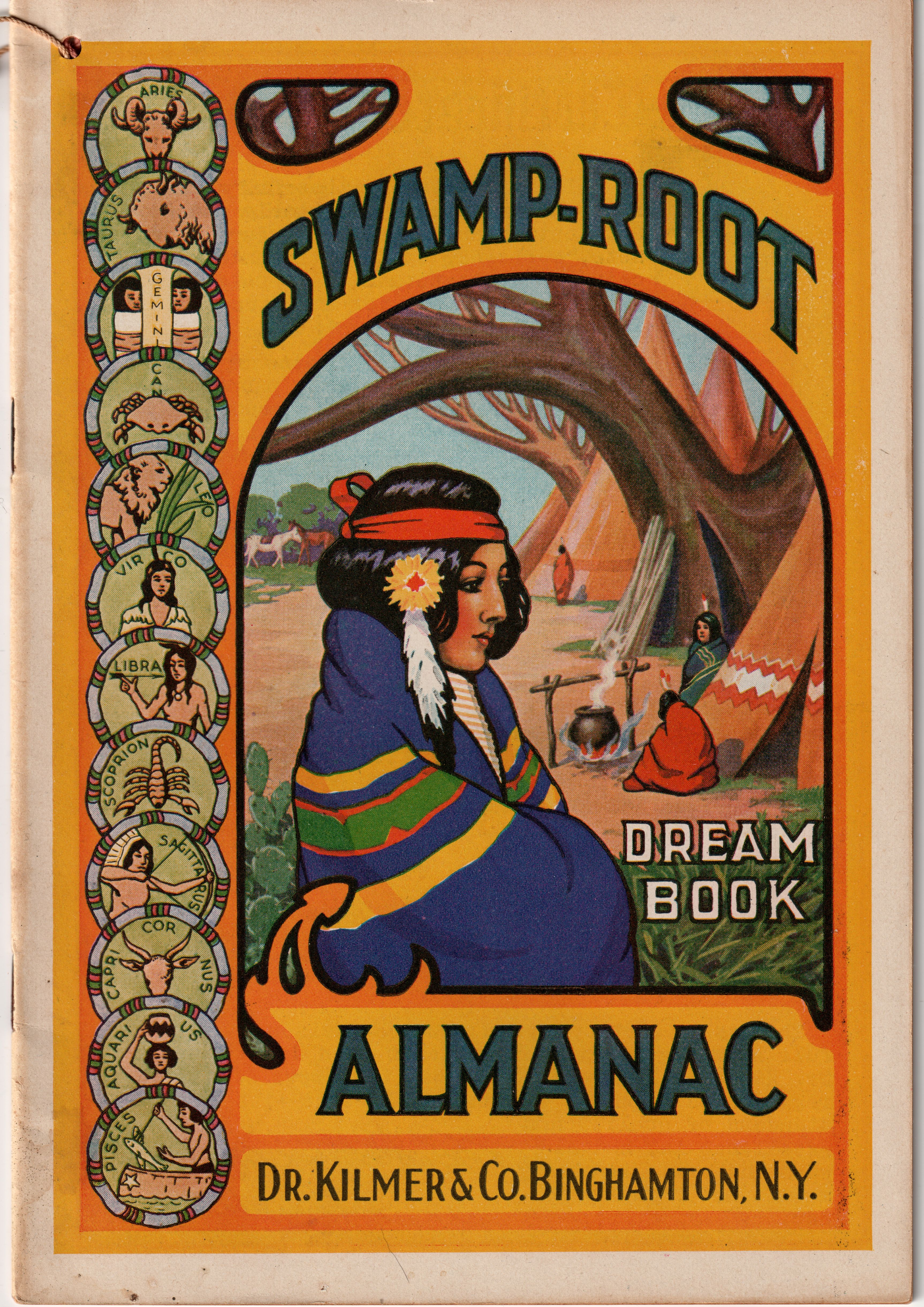
Swamp Root Almanac and Dream Book, Dr. Kilmer & Co of Binghamton

== Thoroughbred racing ==
Kilmer was the breeder of Reigh Count, the winner of the 1928 Kentucky Derby. He was the owner of Exterminator, the winner of the 1918 Kentucky Derby and 1922 American Horse of the Year, and the breeder and owner of Sun Beau, the largest money maker until Seabiscuit in 1939. Both Exterminator and Sun Beau were elected to the National Museum of Racing and Hall of Fame. Two other well-known stallions were Suntica and Sun Briar that was an ancestor of both Secretariat and Affirmed.

== See also ==
- Court Manor
