= Churchill Downs Debutante Stakes =

Horse race in Louisville, Kentucky, US

Debutante Stakes
- Class: Listed
- Location: Churchill Downs; Louisville, Kentucky, United States
- Inaugurated: 1895
- Race type: Thoroughbred – Flat racing
- Website: www.churchilldowns.com

Race information
- Distance: 6 furlongs
- Surface: Dirt
- Track: left-handed
- Qualification: Two-year-old fillies
- Weight: 122 lbs. with allowances
- Purse: US$175,000 (since 2022)

The Debutante Stakes is an American Thoroughbred horse race held annually during the last week of June at Churchill Downs in Louisville, Kentucky. A listed stakes event open to two-year-old fillies, it is contested on dirt over a distance of six furlongs.

It first became a Grade III race in 1996. It was changed from 5.5 furlongs to 6 furlongs in 2006. In 2012, the race was downgraded to listed status.

== Records ==
Speed record

- 1:09.27 – Rated Feisty (2007) (at current distance of 6 furlongs)
- 1:02.52 – Cashier's Dream (2001) (at previous distance of 5.5 furlongs)

Most wins by a trainer

- 7 – D. Wayne Lukas (1986, 1989, 1995, 1997, 2003, 2004, 2009)

Most wins by a jockey

- 3 – Pat Day (1996, 1997, 2002, 2004)
- 3 – Robby Albarado (2008, 2010, 2014)

== Winners since 1995 ==
Year	Winner	Jockey	Trainer	Owner	Time
2022	Wonder Wheel	Tyler Gaffalione	Mark E. Casse	D.J. Stable	1:10.26
2021					
2020					
2019					
2018					
2017	Sunny Skies	Robby Albarado	Kenneth G. McPeek	Normandy Farm	1:11.83
2016	Pretty City Dancer	Julien Leparoux	Mark Casse	John C. Oxley	1:11.01
2015	Cosmic Evolution	Calvin H. Borel	Lon Wiggins	Stephen L. Fidel	1:11.89
2014	Promise Me Silver	Robby Albarado	Bret Calhoun	Robert Luttrell	1.11.49
2013	Fiftyshadesofgold	Corey Lanerie	Clarence Scharbauer Jr.	Clarence Scharbauer Jr.	1.10.63
2012	Blueeyesintherein	Leandro Goncalves	Gary Simms	Self/King/Morgenson/Travis, et al.	1:11.71
2011	Flashy Lassie	Kent Desormeaux	Gary Simms	Barry L. King	1:10.89
2010	Just Louise	Robby Albarado	Dale Romans	Eldon Farm Equine	1:11.85
2009	Decelerator	Julien Leparoux	D. Wayne Lukas	Westrock Stables	1:11.28
2008	Garden District	Robby Albarado	Todd A. Pletcher	Twin Creeks Racing Stable	1:11.07
2007	Rated Fiesty	Shaun Bridgmohan	Steve Asmussen	Heiligbrodt Racing et al.	1:09.27
2006	Richwoman	Shaun Bridgmohan	Steve Asmussen	Heiligbrodt Racing	1:10.50
2005	Effectual	Robby Albarado	Steve Asmussen	Gainesway/George Bolton	1:03.95
2004	Classic Elegance	Pat Day	D. Wayne Lukas	Bob & Beverly Lewis	1:04.18
2003	Be Gentle	Cornelio Velásquez	D. Wayne Lukas	Thomas F. Van Meter II	1:03.96
2002	Awesome Humor	Pat Day	W. Elliott Walden	WinStar Farm	1:03.45
2001	Cashier's Dream	Donnie Meche	Steve Asmussen	Team Valor	1:02.52
2000	Gold Mover	Craig Perret	Mark A. Hennig	Edward P. Evans	1:03.79
1999	Chilukki	Willie Martinez	Bob Baffert	Stonerside Stable	1:03.66
1998	Silverbulletday	Gary Stevens	Bob Baffert	Michael E. Pegram	1:04.70
1997	Love Lock	Pat Day	D. Wayne Lukas	Michael Tabor	1:03.84
1996	Move	Pat Day	Frank L. Brothers	Cherry Valley Farm	1:05.66
1995	Golden Attraction	Donna Barton	D. Wayne Lukas	Overbrook Farm	1:04.19

== Earlier winners ==
- 1994 – Chargedupsycamore
- 1993 – Fly Love
- 1992 – Hollywood Wildcat
- 1991 – Greenhaven Lane
- 1990 – Barbara's Nemesis
- 1989 – Icy Folly
- 1988 – Seaquay
- 1987 – Bold Lady Anne
- 1986 – Burnished Bright
- 1985 – Tricky Fingers
- 1984 – Knot
- 1983 – Arabizon
- 1982 – Ice Fantasy
- 1981 – Pure Platinum
- 1980 – Excitable Lady
- 1979 – lissy
- 1978 – Nervous John
- 1977 – Sweet Little Lady
- 1976 – Olden
- 1975 – Answer
- 1974 – Sun and Snow
- 1973 – Me and Connie
- 1972 – Sylva Mill
- 1971 – Cautious Bidder
- 1970 – Misty Joy
- 1969 – Little Tudor
- 1968 – Alert Princess
- 1967 – Jet To Market
- 1966 – Furl Sail
- 1965 – Ole Liz
- 1964 – Mississippi Mama
- 1963 – Wood Nymph
- 1962 – Speedwell
- 1961 – Helfersartin
- 1960 – Bright Silver
- 1959 – Airmans Guide
- 1958 – Patty's Choice
- 1957 – Margaretta
- 1956 – Delamar
- 1955 – Cherry
- 1954 – Gambetta
- 1953 – Golly
- 1952 – Bubbley
- 1951 – Crownlet
- 1950 – Juliet's Nurse
- 1949 – Aunt Jayne Z
- 1948 – Acoma
- 1947 – Bewitch
- 1946 – Blue Grass
- 1945 – Breezy Louise
- 1944 – Flyweight
- 1943 – Whirlabout
- 1942 – Trustee
- 1941 – Royal Martha
- 1940 – Wise Moss
- 1939 – Downy Pillow
- 1938 – Dolly Whisk
- 1931 – Butter Beans
- 1930 – Betty Derr
- 1929 – Alcibiades
- 1928 – Port Harlem
- 1927 – Anita Peabody
- 1926 – Thirteen Sixty
- 1925 – Epsomite
- 1924 – Kitty Pat
- 1923 – Edna V
- 1922 – Sympathy
- 1921 – Fair Phantom
- 1920 – Bit of White
- 1919 – Talisman
- 1918 – Regalo
- 1917 – Ocean Sweep
- 1916 – Rosabel
- 1915 – Little Sister
- 1914 – Climber
- 1913 – Robinetta
- 1912 – Briar Path
- 1911 – Calisse
- 1910 – Round The World
- 1909 – Ethelburg
- 1908 – Crystal Maid
- 1907 – Ancient
- 1906 – Lillie Turner
- 1905 – Beautiful Bess
- 1904 – Miss Inez
- 1903 – White Plume
- 1902 – Olefiant
- 1901 – Autumn Leaves
- 1900 – Sinfi
- 1899 – Mollie Newman
- 1898 – Rush
- 1897 – Mary Black
- 1896 – Cleophus
- 1895 – Amanda
