= Kentucky Derby top four finishers =

Aspect of American Thoroughbred horse racing scoring system

This is a listing of first-place, second-place, third-place and fourth-place finishers, and the number of starters in the Kentucky Derby, a Grade I American Thoroughbred race run at 1 1/4 miles on dirt for three-year-olds. It is the first leg of the American Triple Crown, run at Churchill Downs in Louisville, Kentucky.

Top four finishers of the Kentucky Derby
Year	Winner	Second	Third	Fourth	Starters
2026	Golden Tempo	Renegade	Ocelli	Chief Wallabee	18
2025	Sovereignty	Journalism	Baeza	Final Gambit	19
2024	Mystik Dan	Sierra Leone	Forever Young	Catching Freedom	20
2023	Mage	Two Phil's	Angel of Empire	Disarm	18
2022	Rich Strike	Epicenter	Zandon	Simplification	20
2021 (Note: In 2021, Medina Spirit finished first, but was disqualified after a post-race urine sample revealed traces of a banned drug, betamethasone, in the horse. Mandaloun was placed first.)	Mandaloun	Hot Rod Charlie	Essential Quality	O Besos	19
2020	Authentic	Tiz the Law	Mr. Big News	Honor A.P.	15
2019 (Note: In 2019, Maximum Security finished first, but was disqualified to 17th for fouling War of Will.)	Country House	Code of Honor	Tacitus	Improbable	20
2018	Justify †	Good Magic	Audible	Instilled Regard	20
2017	Always Dreaming	Lookin At Lee	Battle of Midway	Classic Empire	20
2016	Nyquist	Exaggerator	Gun Runner	Mohaymen	20
2015	American Pharoah †	Firing Line	Dortmund	Frosted	18
2014	California Chrome	Commanding Curve	Danza	Wicked Strong	19
2013	Orb	Golden Soul	Revolutionary	Normandy Invasion	19
2012	I'll Have Another	Bodemeister	Dullahan	Went The Day Well	20
2011	Animal Kingdom	Nehro	Mucho Macho Man	Shackleford	19
2010	Super Saver	Ice Box	Paddy O'Prado	Make Music for Me	20
2009	Mine That Bird	Pioneerof the Nile	Musket Man	Papa Clem	19
2008	Big Brown	Eight Belles	Denis of Cork	Tale of Ekati	20
2007	Street Sense	Hard Spun	Curlin	Imawildandcrazyguy	20
2006	Barbaro	Bluegrass Cat	Steppenwolfer	Jazil	20
2005	Giacomo	Closing Argument	Afleet Alex	Don't Get Mad	20
2004	Smarty Jones	Lion Heart	Imperialism	Limehouse	18
2003	Funny Cide	Empire Maker	Peace Rules	Atswhatimtalkinbout	16
2002	War Emblem	Proud Citizen	Perfect Drift	Medaglia d'Oro	18
2001	Monarchos	Invisible Ink	Congaree	Thunder Blitz	17
2000	Fusaichi Pegasus	Aptitude	Impeachment	More Than Ready	19
1999	Charismatic	Menifee	Cat Thief	Prime Timber	19
1998	Real Quiet	Victory Gallop	Indian Charlie	Halory Hunter	15
1997	Silver Charm	Captain Bodgit	Free House	Pulpit	13
1996	Grindstone	Cavonnier	Prince of Thieves	Halo Sunshine	19
1995	Thunder Gulch	Tejano Run	Timber Country	Jumron	19
1994	Go for Gin	Strodes Creek	Blumin Affair	Brocco	14
1993	Sea Hero	Prairie Bayou	Wild Gale	Personal Hope	19
1992	Lil E. Tee	Casual Lies	Dance Floor	Conte Di Savoya	18
1991	Strike the Gold	Best Pal	Mane Minister	Green Alligator	16
1990	Unbridled	Summer Squall	Pleasant Tap	Video Ranger	15
1989	Sunday Silence	Easy Goer	Awe Inspiring	Dansil	15
1988	Winning Colors	Forty Niner	Risen Star	Proper Reality	17
1987	Alysheba	Bet Twice	Avies Copy	Cryptoclearance	17
1986	Ferdinand	Bold Arrangement	Broad Brush	Rampage	16
1985	Spend A Buck	Stephan's Odyssey	Chief's Crown	Fast Account	13
1984 (Note: In 1984, Gate Dancer finished fourth, but was disqualified for fouling Fali Time, who was then moved up from 5th to 4th place.)	Swale	Coax Me Chad	At The Threshold	Fali Time	20
1983	Sunny's Halo	Desert Wine	Caveat	Slew o' Gold	20
1982	Gato Del Sol	Laser Light	Reinvested	Water Bank	19
1981	Pleasant Colony	Woodchopper	Partez	Classic Go Go	21
1980	Genuine Risk	Rumbo	Jaklin Klugman	Super Moment	13
1979	Spectacular Bid	General Assembly	Golden Act	King Celebrity	10
1978	Affirmed †	Alydar	Funny Horse	Darby Creek Road	11
1977	Seattle Slew †	Run Dusty Run	Sanhedrin	Get the Axe	15
1976	Bold Forbes	Honest Pleasure	Elocutionist	Amano	9
1975	Foolish Pleasure	Avatar	Diabolo	Master Derby	15
1974	Cannonade	Hudson County	Agitate	J. R.'s Pet	23
1973	Secretariat †	Sham	Our Native	Forego	13
1972	Riva Ridge	No Le Hace	Hold Your Peace	Introductivo	16
1971	Canonero II	Jim French	Bold Reason	Eastern Fleet	20
1970	Dust Commander	My Dad George	High Echelon	Naskra	17
1969	Majestic Prince	Arts and Letters	Dike	Traffic Mark	8
1968 (Note: In 1968, Dancer's Image finished first, but was disqualified after a post-race urine sample revealed traces of a banned drug in the horse. The drug in question - phenylbutazone - illegal at the time, is now legal for use on racehorses in many states, including Kentucky. Forward Pass was placed first.)	Forward Pass	Francie's Hat	T.V. Commercial	Kentucky Sherry	14
1967	Proud Clarion	Barbs Delight	Damascus	Reason to Hail	14
1966	Kauai King	Advocator	Blue Skyer	Stupendous	15
1965	Lucky Debonair	Dapper Dan	Tom Rolfe	Native Charger	11
1964	Northern Dancer	Hill Rise	The Scoundrel	Roman Brother	12
1963	Chateaugay	Never Bend	Candy Spots	On My Honor	9
1962	Decidedly	Roman Line	Ridan	Sir Ribot	15
1961	Carry Back	Crozier	Bass Clef	Dr. Miller	15
1960	Venetian Way	Bally Ache	Victoria Park	Tompion	13
1959	Tomy Lee	Sword Dancer	First Landing	Royal Orbit	17
1958	Tim Tam	Lincoln Road	Noureddin	Jewel's Reward	14
1957	Iron Liege	Gallant Man	Round Table	Bold Ruler	9
1956	Needles	Fabius	Come On Red	Count Chic	17
1955	Swaps	Nashua	Summer Tan	Racing Fool	10
1954	Determine	Hasty Road	Hasseyampa	Goyamo	17
1953	Dark Star	Native Dancer	Invigorator	Royal Bay Gem	11
1952	Hill Gail	Sub Fleet	Blue Man	Master Fiddle	16
1951	Count Turf	Royal Mustang	Ruhe	Phil D	20
1950	Middleground	Hill Prince	Mr. Trouble	Sunglow	14
1949	Ponder	Capot	Palestinian	Old Rockport	14
1948	Citation †	Coaltown	My Request	Billings	6
1947	Jet Pilot	Phalanx	Faultless	On Trust	13
1946	Assault †	Spy Song	Hampden	Lord Boswell	17
1945	Hoop Jr.	Pot O'Luck	Darby Dieppe	Air Sailor	16
1944	Pensive	Broadcloth	Stir Up	Shut Up	16
1943	Count Fleet †	Blue Swords	Slide Rule	Amber Light	10
1942	Shut Out	Alsab	Valdina Orphan	With Regards	15
1941	Whirlaway †	Staretor	Market Wise	Porter's Cap	11
1940	Gallahadion	Bimelech	Dit	Mioland	8
1939	Johnstown	Challedon	Heather Broom	Viscounty	8
1938	Lawrin	Dauber	Can't Wait	Menow	10
1937	War Admiral †	Pompoon	Reaping Reward	Melodist	20
1936	Bold Venture	Brevity	Indian Broom	Coldstream	14
1935	Omaha †	Roman Soldier	Whiskolo	Nellie Flag	18
1934	Cavalcade	Discovery	Agrarian	Mata Hari	13
1933	Brokers Tip	Head Play	Charley O.	Ladysman	13
1932	Burgoo King	Economic	Stepenfetchit	Brandon Mint	20
1931	Twenty Grand	Sweep All	Mate	Spanish Play	12
1930	Gallant Fox †	Gallant Knight	Ned O.	Gone Away	15
1929	Clyde Van Dusen	Naishapur	Panchio	Blue Larkspur	21
1928	Reigh Count	Misstep	Toro	Jack Higgins	22
1927	Whiskery	Osmand	Jock	Hydromel	15
1926	Bubbling Over	Bagenbaggage	Rock Man	Rhinock	13
1925	Flying Ebony	Captain Hal	Son of John	Single Foot	20
1924	Black Gold	Chilhowee	Beau Butler	Altawood	19
1923	Zev	Martingale	Vigil	Nassau	21
1922	Morvich	Bet Mosie	John Finn	Deadlock	10
1921	Behave Yourself	Black Servant	Prudery	Tryster	12
1920	Paul Jones	Upset	On Watch	Damask	17
1919	Sir Barton †	Billy Kelly	Under Fire	Valcanite	12
1918	Exterminator	Escoba	Viva America	War Cloud	8
1917	Omar Khayyam	Ticket	Midway	Rickety	15
1916	George Smith	Star Hawk	Franklin	Dodge	9
1915	Regret	Pebbles I	Sharpshooter	Royal II	16
1914	Old Rosebud	Hodge	Bronzewing	John Gund	7
1913	Donerail	Ten Point	Gowell	Foundation	8
1912	Worth	Duval	Flamma	Free Lance	7
1911	Meridian	Governor Gray	Colston	Mud Sill	7
1910	Donau	Joe Morris	Fighting Bob	Boola Boola	7
1909	Wintergreen	Miami	Dr. Barkley	Sir Catesby	10
1908	Stone Street	Sir Cleges	Dunvegan	Synchronized	8
1907	Pink Star	Zal	Ovelando	Red Gauntlet	6
1906	Sir Huon	Lady Navarre	James Reddick	Hyperion II	6
1905	Agile	Ram's Horn	Layson	none	3
1904	Elwood	Ed Tierney	Brancas	Prince Silverwings	5
1903	Judge Himes	Early	Bourbon	Bad News	6
1902	Alan-a-Dale	Inventor	The Rival	Abe Frank	4
1901	His Eminence	Sannazarro	Driscoll	Amur	5
1900	Lieut. Gibson	Florizar	Thrive	Highland Lad	7
1899	Manuel	Corsini	Mazo	His Lordship	5
1898	Plaudit	Lieber Karl	Isabey	Han d'Or	4
1897	Typhoon II	Ornament	Dr. Catlett	Dr. Shepard	6
1896	Ben Brush	Ben Eder	Semper Ego	First Mate	8
1895	Halma	Basso	Laureate	Curator	4
1894	Chant	Pearl Song	Sigurd	Al Boyer	5
1893	Lookout	Plutus	Boundless	Buck McCann	6
1892	Azra	Huron	Phil Dwyer	none	3
1891	Kingman	Balgowan	High Tariff	Hart Wallace	4
1890	Riley	Bill Letcher	Robespierre	Palisade	6
1889	Spokane	Proctor Knott	Once Again	Hindoocraft	8
1888	Macbeth II	Gallifet	White	Alexandria	7
1887	Montrose	Jim Gore	Jacobin	Banburg	7
1886	Ben Ali	Blue Wing	Free Knight	Lijero	10
1885	Joe Cotton	Bersan	Ten Booker	Favor	10
1884	Buchanan	Loftin	Audrain	Bob Miles	9
1883	Leonatus	Drake Carter	Lord Raglan	Ascender	7
1882	Apollo	Runnymede	Bengal	Harry Gilmore	14
1881	Hindoo	Lelex	Alfambra	Sligo	6
1880	Fonso	Kimball	Bancroft	Boulevard	5
1879	Lord Murphy	Falsetto	Strathmore	Trinadad	9
1878	Day Star	Himyar	Leveler	Solicitor	9
1877	Baden-Baden	Leonard	King William	Vera Cruz	11
1876	Vagrant	Creedmore	Harry Hill	Parole	11
1875	Aristides	Oliver Lewis	Ansel Williamson	Hal Price McGrath	15

A † designates a Triple Crown Winner.

Note: D. Wayne Lukas swept the 1995 Triple Crown with two different horses.

== See also ==
- Kentucky Oaks top three finishers
- List of graded stakes at Churchill Downs
