= 1908 Kentucky Derby =

Horse race

34th Kentucky Derby
- Kentucky Derby
- Grade I stakes race
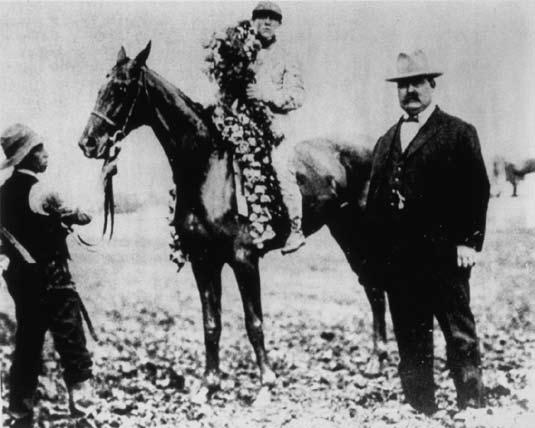
- 1908 Kentucky Derby winner Stone Street
- Location: Churchill Downs
- Date: May 5, 1908
- Winning horse: Stone Street
- Jockey: Arthur Pickens
- Trainer: John W. Hall
- Owner: C.E. & J.W. Hamilton
- Surface: Dirt

The 1908 Kentucky Derby was the 34th running of the Kentucky Derby. The race took place on May 5, 1908. Muddy track conditions made the winning time 2:15.20 the slowest Derby ever. The winner was 61-1 and marked the last (most recent) time that the winner lost his most recent race by 10 or more lengths.

== Full results ==
Finished	Post	Horse	Jockey	Trainer	Owner	Time / behind
1st	4	Stone Street	Arthur Pickens	John W. Hall	C. E. "Bud" & John W. Hamilton	2:15.20
2nd	2	Sir Cleges	Charles Koerner	Peter W. Coyne	George J. Long	3
3rd	1	Dunvegan	Paul Warren	William J. Young	Johnson N. Camden Jr.	Head
4th	8	Synchronized	Fred Burton	Fred Luzader	D. W. Armstrong	Head
5th	5	Banbridge	Vincent Powers	David Henry	Barney Schreiber	Head
6th	3	Milford	Andy Minder	William H. Fizer	W. H. Fizer & Co.	6
7th	6	Bill Herron	James Lee	William J. Young	Barney Dreyfuss	Head
8th	7	Frank Bird	J. Williams	not available	W. A. Hughes	20

- Winning Breeder: James B. A. Haggin; (KY)

== Payout ==
Post	Horse	Win	Place	Show
4	Stone Street	$ 123.60	37.90	14.50
2	Sir Cleges		11.10	8.50
1	Dunvegan			11.10

- The winner received a purse of $4,850.
- Second place received $700.
- Third place received $300.
