= Latonia Race Track =

Horse racing facility in Kentucky

Coordinates: 39.0427°N 84.5098°W

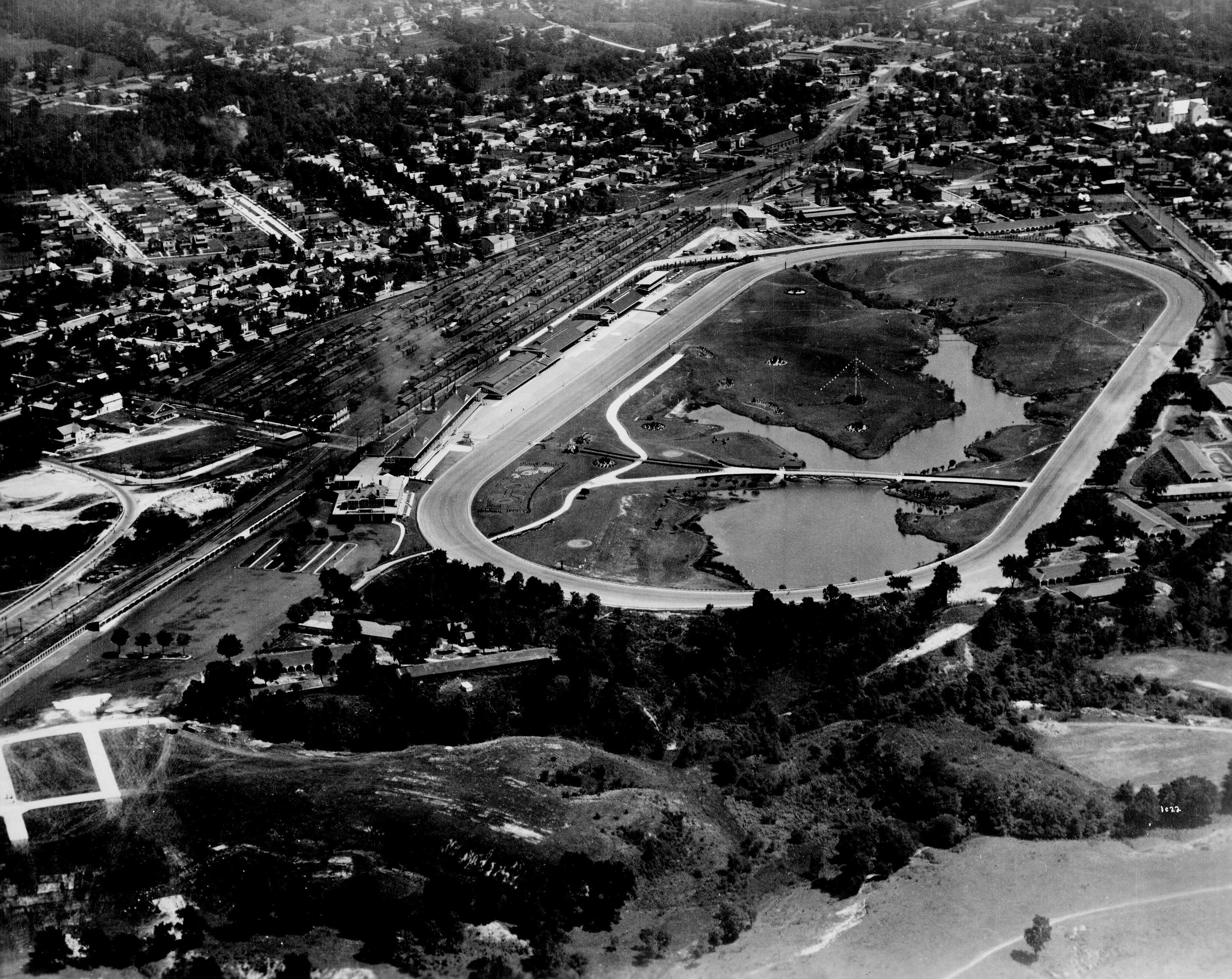
Aerial view, 1922

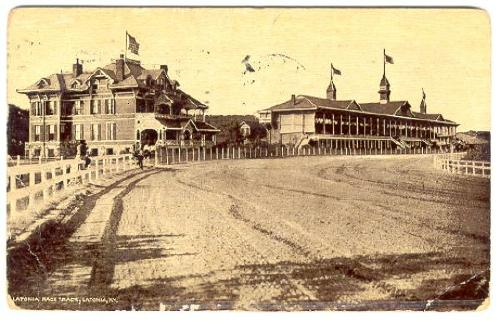
Latonia Race Track 1909

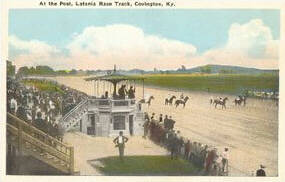
Latonia Race Track c.1910

Latonia Race Track on Winston Avenue in Latonia (Covington) Kentucky, six miles south of Cincinnati, Ohio, was a Thoroughbred horse racing facility opened in 1883.

The track hosted a spring-summer racing series and a second in late fall. It was once regarded as among the United States' top sites for racing, and drew more than 100,000 visitors annually. The 1924 Kentucky Derby winner Black Gold ran at Latonia Race Track, and jockey Eddie Arcaro got his start there.

== Latonia Derby ==
The track's main attraction was the annual 1½ mile Latonia Derby, initially run as the "Hindoo Stakes" in honor of the great Kentucky-bred champion Hindoo.It became so popular that in 1912 a motion picture was made by Independent Motion Picture Co. titled Winning the Latonia Derby that featured silent film star King Baggot.

The inaugural 1883 Latonia Derby was won by Kentucky Derby winner Leonatus. Future Derby winners Kingman (1891), Halma (1895), Ben Brush (1896), Lieut. Gibson (1900), Elwood (1904), and Sir Huon (1906) also won the race and the 1918 edition was won by Harry Payne Whitney's Belmont Stakes winning colt, Johren.

== Early airmeet ==
In November 1909, an airmeet was held at Latonia. The airmeet was a small affair, but included famed aviator Glenn Curtiss and others such as Charles Willard and Roy Knabenshue. The highlight of the meet was a race held between Curtiss and Willard "for a cup offered by the local capitalist". The meet was "understood to be the opening move to secure for Cincinnati the international aviation meet in 1910", although the meet would eventually be held in Dominguez Field, Los Angeles instead.

== Crash ==
In the days when a rope was used as the starting barrier and restarts were a common problem, in a 1917 race with a field of twelve starters, five horses crashed at the start of a race. July 1, 1939, marked the first time Thoroughbred racing used an electric starting gate, the invention of Texan Clay Puett.

== 1924 International Special ==
On October 11, 1924, 60,000 racing fans flocked to Latonia Race Track to witness the third and final edition of the International Special races that pitted the honored guest, French champion Epinard, against top American horses. The race featured stars of the day such as Chilhowee and Belmont Stakes winner Mad Play plus future U.S. Hall of Famers Princess Doreen and Sarazen. It was Sarazen who won the race and with it sealed Horse of the Year honors. Epinard finished second, as he had done in the previous two International Specials at Belmont Park and Aqueduct Racetrack in New York City.

== Thoroughbred stakes races at Latonia Race Track ==
- Clipsetta Stakes (1883–1937)
- Harold Stakes
- Latonia Autumn Inaugural Handicap
- Latonia Championship Stakes
- Latonia Cup Handicap
- Latonia Derby
- Latonia Independence Handicap
- Latonia Oaks
- Quickstep Handicap

== Closure ==
Financial difficulties during the Great Depression forced Latonia Race Track to close its doors with its last race card held on July 29, 1939. The facility was sold to the Latonia Refining Corporation and dismantled during World War II. Today the property is the site of the Latonia Shopping Center and WCVG-AM radio.

In 1959, a new operation called the Latonia Race Course opened in Florence, Kentucky about 10 miles west of the original Latonia site. In 1986 that facility changed its name to Turfway Park.
