= Frank Robinson (jockey) =

American jockey

Personal information
- Born: April 8, 1898 Cleveland, Ohio, United States
- Died: April 4, 1919 (aged 20) Bowie, Maryland
- Resting place: Cave Hill Cemetery, Louisville, Kentucky
- Occupation: Jockey

Horse racing career
- Sport: Horse racing

Major racing wins
- King Edward Hotel Gold Cup (1916); Kindergarten Selling Stakes (1916); Jacques Cartier Selling Stakes (1916); Philadelphia Handicap (1916, 1917); Prince Edward Selling Stakes (1916); Brantford Handicap (1916); Hamilton Cup (1916); W. Maginn Memorial Cup (1916); Stanley Produce Stakes (1916); Grey Stakes (1916); Columbus Handicap (1916); Prince George Handicap (1916); Ellicott City Handicap (1916); Latonia Cup Handicap (1916); Pimlico Fall Serial Handicap (1916); Aberdeen Stakes (1917); Army and Navy Purse (1917); Empire City Derby (1917); Fashion Stakes (1917); Huron Handicap (1917, 1918); Queens County Handicap (1917); Susquehanna Handicap (1917); Bowie Handicap (1918); Glen Cove Selling Stakes (1918); Latonia Derby (1918); Lawrence Realization Stakes (1918); Pimlico Nursery Stakes (1918); Saratoga Cup (1918); Saratoga Handicap (1918); Suburban Handicap (1918) Canadian Classic Race wins: King's Plate (1917) American Classic Race wins: Belmont Stakes (1918)

Racing awards
- Canadian Champion Jockey by wins (1916); American Champion Jockey by wins (1916); American Champion Jockey by earnings (1917)

Significant horses
- Belle Mahone, Hourless, Johren, Old Rosebud, Roamer, Tippity Witchet

Frank Robinson (April 8, 1898 – April 4, 1919) was an American Champion Thoroughbred horse racing jockey.

== Biography ==
A native of Cleveland, Ohio, riding in the pre U.S. Triple Crown era, Frank Robinson competed at racetracks in New York State, Maryland, Kentucky, Louisiana, and in Ontario and Quebec in Canada as well as at Oriental Park Racetrack in Havana, Cuba.

Given his first opportunity to ride by Edward Trotter, owner of a racing stable in Montreal, Quebec, Canada, in his apprentice year, Frank Robinson won the first five races at the Dorval Park Racetrack in Montreal then soon after won four of the six races on an afternoon card at Blue Bonnets Raceway. In what The New York Times described as a phenomenal performance, in 1916 Frank Robinson was the leading jockey in the United States with 178 wins as well as the leading jockey in Canada with 129 wins. In 1917 he was second to Willie Crump in wins but led all American jockeys in earnings with $148,057. On April 3, 1917, Robinson won four races on a single card at Bowie Race Track in Bowie, Maryland. For American-born trainer Barry Littlefield and the preeminent owner in Canada, distiller, Joseph E. Seagram, in 1917 Frank Robinson won Canada's most prestigious race, the King's Plate. That same year he rode future Hall of Fame inductee Old Rosebud to victory in the Queens County Handicap at New York's Aqueduct Racetrack.

During his very short career, Robinson competed in one Kentucky Derby, finishing fourth in the 1917 edition aboard Whitney's colt, Rickety. That same year he had an eighth-place finish in his only Preakness Stakes appearance. In 1918, Robinson rode Whitney's outstanding colt Johren in all of his races. Among his wins aboard Johren were the Latonia Derby in which he defeated the great Exterminator, and the Belmont Stakes, in which he beat War Cloud. Johren would earn American Horse of the Year honors. In addition to the Whitney stable, Frank Robinson also rode for prominent owners such as Joseph E. Widener, August Belmont, Jr., and Frank J. Nolan's Beverwyck Stable. For owner Andrew Miller he won the 1918 Saratoga Handicap aboard future Hall of Fame inductee, Roamer.

== Death ==
On April 4, 1919, four days short of his 21st birthday, Robinson was killed in a racing accident at Bowie Race Track in Bowie, Maryland. An investigation concluded he was a victim of an error by another jockey. He was eulogized as "America's premier jockey" by multiple North American news outlets. A contract rider for Harry Payne Whitney on a first call basis, at the time of his death, Robinson was the highest paid jockey in the United States.

Robinson had married Lucy Simcoe on February 22, 1919, and at the time of his death she was pregnant with a daughter she would name Frankie. He was buried in Louisville, Kentucky, where he and his wife made their home.

== Additional sources ==
- September 21, 1918 New York Times article titled ROBINSON IN FRONT ON THREE MOUNTS
- April 5, 1919 Chicago Daily Tribune article titled JOCKEY F. ROBINSON DEAD AND THREE HURT IN BOWIE RACE CRASH
