= Silver Cloud (horse) =

American Thoroughbred racehorse

- Sire: Grinstead
- Grandsire: Gilroy
- Dam: Experiment
- Damsire: Monarchist
- Sex: Stallion
- Foaled: 1883
- Country: United States
- Colour: Bay
- Breeder: Elias J. "Lucky" Baldwin
- Owner: Elias J. "Lucky" Baldwin
- Trainer: Albert Cooper

Major wins
- Barrett Stakes (1885); American Derby (1886); Hindoo Stakes (1886)

Silver Cloud (1883 – November 14, 1886) was an American Thoroughbred racehorse bred and raced by "Lucky" Baldwin. He was trained by the prominent African-American Albert Cooper and ridden by the future U.S. Racing Hall of Fame inductee African-American jockey Isaac Murphy.

== Racing career ==
As a two-year-old, Silver Cloud's racing career started slowly and it wasn't until July when he began to show some promise when he finished third in the Kenwood Stakes over five furlongs at Washington Park Race Track in Chicago. In September he ran second in the Maiden Stakes at Latonia Race Track in Latonia, Kentucky. Still at Latonia, in October Silver Cloud finished second in the six furlong Kimball Stakes then showed he preferred a longer distance when he won the Barrett Stakes over a distance of one mile.

In 1886 Silver Cloud won two very important races and ran third in four others including the Travers Stakes at Saratoga Race Course. He won the prestigious American Derby at Washington Park and the Hindoo Stakes at Latonia, both of which were contested at a mile and a half.

== Untimely death ==
Silver Cloud was returned to race on the West Coast during the winter months. On November 14, 1886, while being exercised at Bay District Racetrack in San Francisco a gate had mistakenly not been shut and Silver Cloud charged out and would die instantly when he crashed into a fence.

Silver Cloud was initially buried in the equine cemetery at his owner's Rancho Santa Anita in what today is Los Angeles County, California. As a result of acreage sales to real estate developers, the grave of Silver Cloud and the three other of Lucky Baldwin's American Derby winners along with the large granite Maltese cross were relocated to the paddock gardens at Santa Anita Park.
