= Pink Star =

American-bred Thoroughbred racehorse

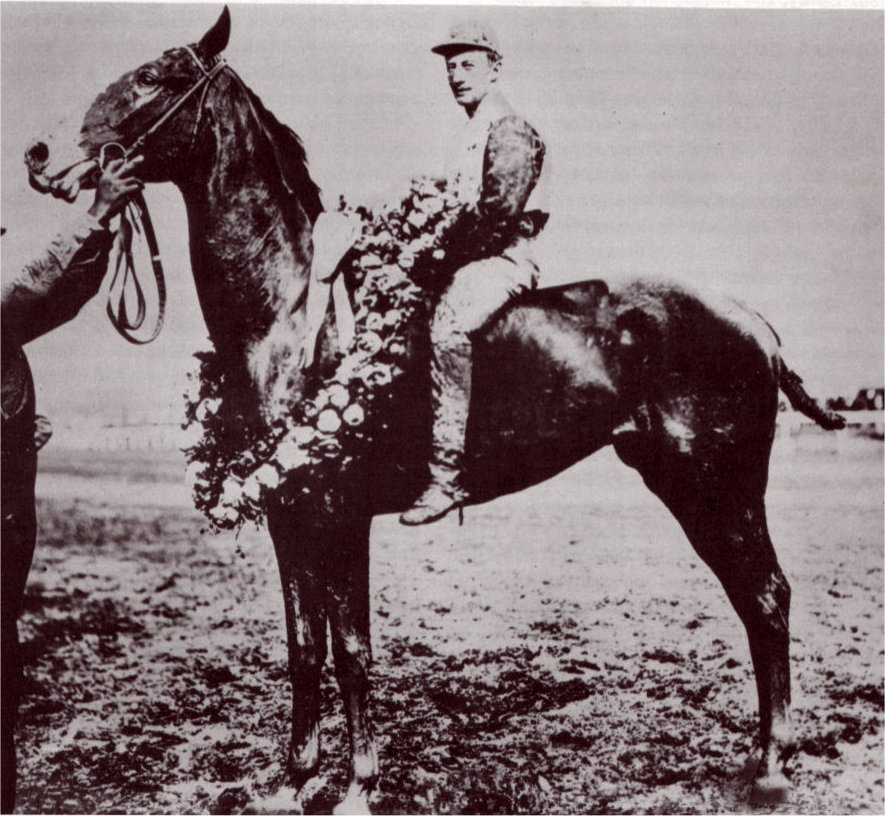
- Pink Star after his 1907 Kentucky Derby win with jockey Andy Minder.
- Sire: Pink Coat
- Grandsire: Leonatus
- Dam: Mary Malloy
- Damsire: Pat Malloy
- Sex: Stallion, eventually Gelding
- Foaled: 1904
- Country: United States
- Colour: Dark Bay
- Breeder: J. Hal Woodford
- Owner: J. Hal Woodford
- Trainer: William H. Fizer
- Record: 16: 3-1-2
- Earnings: $5,750

Major wins
- American Classics wins: Kentucky Derby (1907)

Pink Star (foaled 1904 in Kentucky) was an American Thoroughbred racehorse and was the winner of the 1907 Kentucky Derby. He was a grandson of 1883 Kentucky Derby winner Leonatus and his sire, Pink Coat, was an American Derby winner.

Pink Star won the Kentucky Derby by two lengths over Zal on a very wet track, with the mud being a fetlock deep in some places. Ridden by Andy Minder, his win was a long shot victory and Pink Star was described by contemporary sources as a lumbering and ugly mount. Pink Star finished in last place for the 1907 Latonia Derby, developing a fever and respiratory infection shortly after the running that permanently impacted his breathing.

By May 1908, Pink Star had been gelded and retired from racing due to poor performance and having a bad temperament. He lived the remainder of his life as a plow horse at the farm of J. Hal Woodford in Louisville, Kentucky. He was noted to be dead by 1914.

== Pedigree ==
Pedigree of Pink Star
Sire Pink Coat 1895	Leonatus 1880	Longfellow	Leamington
Sire Pink Coat 1895	Leonatus 1880	Longfellow	Nantura
Sire Pink Coat 1895	Leonatus 1880	Semper Felix	Phaeton
Sire Pink Coat 1895	Leonatus 1880	Semper Felix	Crucifix
Sire Pink Coat 1895	Alice Brand 1889	Hindoo	Virgil
Sire Pink Coat 1895	Alice Brand 1889	Hindoo	Florence
Sire Pink Coat 1895	Alice Brand 1889	Lady of the Lake	Hyder Ali
Sire Pink Coat 1895	Alice Brand 1889	Lady of the Lake	Addie Warren
Dam Mary Malloy 1887	Pat Malloy 1865	Lexington	Boston
Dam Mary Malloy 1887	Pat Malloy 1865	Lexington	Alice Carneal
Dam Mary Malloy 1887	Pat Malloy 1865	Gloriana	American Eclipse
Dam Mary Malloy 1887	Pat Malloy 1865	Gloriana	Trifle
Dam Mary Malloy 1887	Favorite 1875	King Ernest	King Tom
Dam Mary Malloy 1887	Favorite 1875	King Ernest	Ernestine
Dam Mary Malloy 1887	Favorite 1875	Jersey Belle	Australian
Dam Mary Malloy 1887	Favorite 1875	Jersey Belle	Aerolite
