= Andy Minder =

American jockey

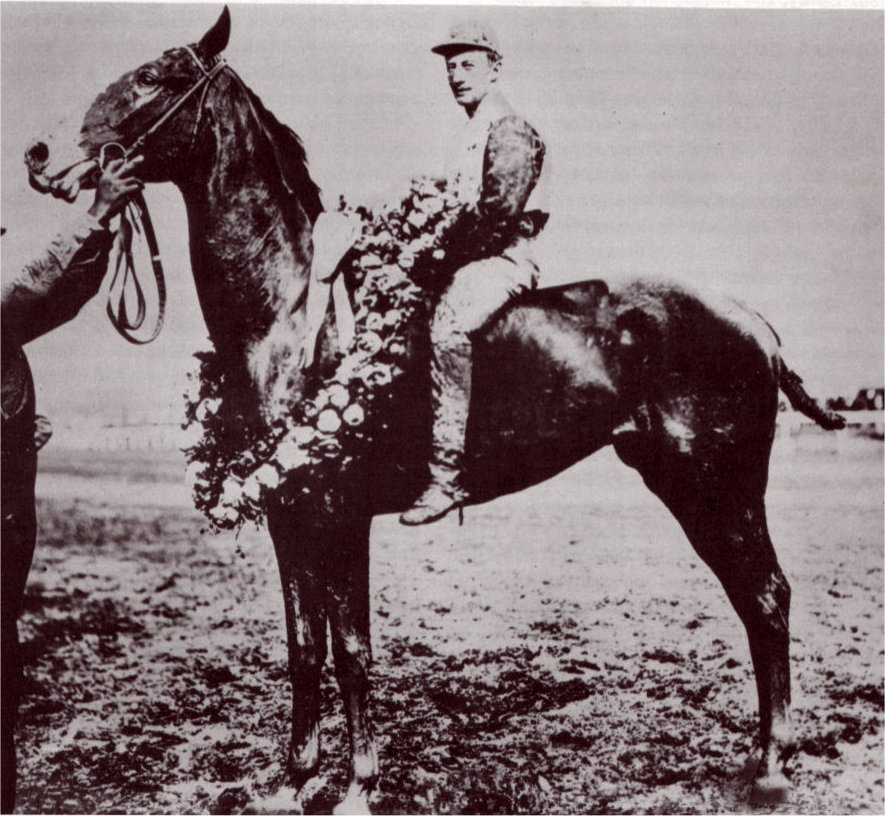
- Andy Minder at the 1907 Kentucky Derby

Personal information
- Born: c. 1860 Brooklyn, New York City, New York
- Died: May 5, 1943 Detroit, Michigan
- Occupation: Jockey

Horse racing career
- Sport: Horse racing
- Career wins: 900+

Racing awards
- Clipsetta Stakes (1902); Detroit Stakes (1902); Manhanset Stakes (1903); Spring Stakes (1903); Bluegrass Stakes (1904); Decoration Handicap (1908); Latonia Derby (1908) American Classic Race win: Kentucky Derby (1907)

Honors
- Fort Erie Champion Jockey (1902); Kenilworth Park Champion Jockey (1902)

Significant horses
- Magistrate; Pink Star; Pinkola

Andrew Minder (c.1860 – May 5, 1943) was an American jockey. He rode the winning horse Pink Star in the 1907 Kentucky Derby for trainer William Fizer. A native of Brooklyn, New York City, New York, Minder became a jockey at 16 and rode for twenty years.

In 1902 Andy Minder was the leading rider at the Fort Erie Race Track as well as the Kenilworth Park Racetrack in Buffalo, New York. Minder was aboard Her Letter when he won the 1902 Detroit Stakes at the Highland Park racecourse in Detroit. He also won the 1902 Clipsetta Stakes at Latonia Race Track and then in 1908 got his most important win at that track when he rode Pinkola to victory in the Latonia Derby.

When his career as a jockey ended, Andy Minder remained active in racing and by 1936 he was the owner of horses competing at the Detroit racecourses. He died at age 62 in Detroit, Michigan where he had been living for the past 25 years.
