= 1907 Kentucky Derby =

Horse race

33rd Kentucky Derby
- Kentucky Derby
- Grade I stakes race
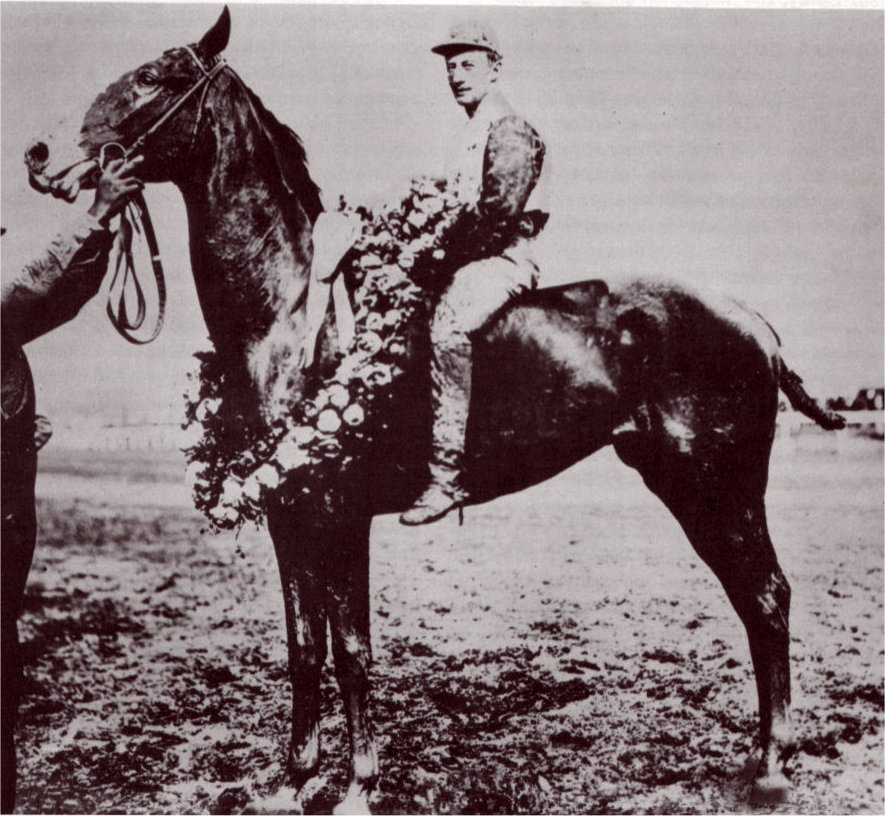
- Pink Star and jockey Andy Minder after their win in the 1907 Kentucky Derby
- Location: Churchill Downs
- Date: May 6, 1907
- Winning horse: Pink Star
- Jockey: Andy Minder
- Trainer: William H. Fizer
- Owner: J. Hal Woodford
- Surface: Dirt

The 1907 Kentucky Derby was the 33rd running of the Kentucky Derby. The race took place on May 6, 1907, over a muddy track. The field was reduced to six competitors when Arcite and Boxara scratched.

== Full results ==
Finished	Post	Horse	Jockey	Trainer	Owner	Time / behind
1st	6	Pink Star	Andy Minder	William H. Fizer	J. Hal Woodford	2:12.60
2nd	3	Zal	Jimmy Boland	William McDaniel	William Gerst Sr.	2
3rd	1	Ovelando	Dave Nicol	James P. Ross	Martin Doyle	1 1/2
4th	5	Red Gauntlet	Dale Austin	Thomas P. Hayes	Thomas P. Hayes	2
5th	4	Wool Sandals	Ted Koerner	Robert E. Campbell	William E. Applegate	5
6th	2	Orlandwick	James Lee	A. D. Steele	Allen S. Steele	6

- Winning Breeder: J. Hal Woodford; (KY)

== Payout ==
- The winner received a purse of $4,850.
- Second place received $700.
- Third place received $300.
