= George Archibald (jockey) =

American jockey

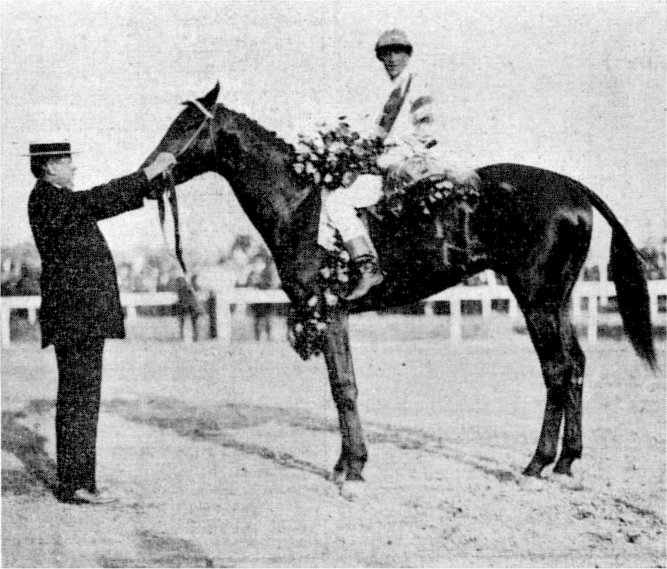
- George Archibald on winner Meridian held by owner Richard F. Carman at the May 13, 1911 Kentucky Derby.

Personal information
- Born: 1890 San Francisco, California, United States
- Died: April 5, 1927 (aged 36–37) Newmarket, Suffolk, England
- Occupation: Jockey

Horse racing career
- Sport: Horse racing

Major racing wins
- United States: Brighton Handicap (1910); Double Event Stakes (part 2) (1910); Empire City Handicap (1910); Suburban Handicap (1910); Camden Handicap (1910); Merchants and Citizens Handicap (1910); Rennert Stakes (1910); Fleetwing Handicap (1910); Seagram Cup Handicap (1910); National Handicap (1911) American Classics wins: Kentucky Derby (1911) Europe: Preis des Winterfavoriten (1911, 1916); Grosser Preis von Berlin (1912, 1913); Preis von Donaueschingen (1912, 1913, 1915); Hammonia-Preis (1912); Grosser Preis von Hamburg (1913); Union-Rennen (1913, 1914); Grosser Hansa-Preis (1913, 1914); Grosser Preis von Hannover (1913); Rheinisches Zucht-Rennen (1913); Oppenheim-Memorial (1913, 1915); Silberner Schild (1914); Jubiläums-Preis - Hannover (1914); Jubiläums-Preis - Hamburg (1914); Goldene Peitsche (1915); City and Suburban Handicap (1922); Hardwicke Stakes (1923); Cesarewitch Handicap (1923); Manchester Cup (1924); Goodwood Stakes (1924); King George Stakes (1924) Nunthorpe Stakes (1924) European Classic Races wins: German St. Leger (1912, 1913); Henckel-Rennen (German 2000 Guineas) (1913, 1914); Austrian Derby (1913); Preis der Diana (German Oaks) (1913); German Derby (1914); 2000 Guineas Stakes (1922); Irish 2000 Guineas (1922); Irish Derby (1922, 1924)

Significant horses
- Olambala, Meridian, Mumtaz Mahal, St Louis, Rose Prince, Spike Island, Town Guard

George William Archibald (1890 – April 5, 1927) was an American jockey. He rode the winning horse Meridian in the 1911 Kentucky Derby. He was also a Champion Jockey in Germany four times (1913–1916) where he rode for Baron Simon Alfred Oppenheim's Schlenderhan stable. He won the 1912 German St. Leger on Royal Blue, the 1913 German 2000 Guineas and Austrian Derby on Csardas and German Oaks and German St. Leger on Orchidee II and the 1914 German 2000 Guineas on Terminus and German Derby on Ariel. He moved to Spain where he won the Gran Premio de Madrid three times (1919,20,21). Archibald came to England in 1922 to take up retainer with Peter Gilpin at Clarehaven Stables in Newmarket. He won the 2000 Guineas Stakes with St Louis. He rode in the Epsom Derby for King George VI. His other good mounts included that year's leading 2 year old, Town Guard, and the Irish 2000 Guineas and Irish Derby winner, Spike Island. Further important winners included A. K. Macomber's Rose Prince in the Cesarewitch Handicap and a dead-heat in the Irish Derby abroad Zodiac in 1924. In all he rode one hundred and eighty winners in England. His best year was 1924, when he scored in fifty two races.

George Archibald died of heart failure on April 5, 1927.
