= Dunboyne (horse) =

American-bred Thoroughbred racehorse

- Sire: Uncas
- Grandsire: Lexington
- Dam: Frey
- Damsire: Dundee
- Sex: Stallion
- Foaled: 1884
- Country: United States
- Colour: Bay
- Breeder: William Jennings Sr.
- Owner: William Jennings Sr.
- Trainer: William Jennings Sr.

Major wins
- Excelsior Stakes (1887); Preakness Stakes (1887); Oriental Handicap (1888)

Dunboyne was an American Thoroughbred racehorse. Ridden by William Donohue for owner, breeder and trainer William Jennings Sr., Dunboyne won the 1887 Preakness Stakes.
