= 1911 Kentucky Derby =

Horse race

37th Kentucky Derby
- Kentucky Derby
- Grade I stakes race
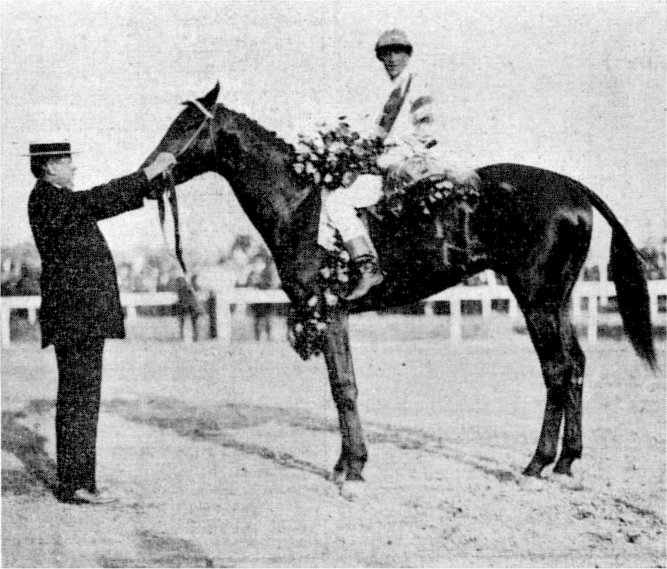
- Meridian with R.F. Carman and jockey George Archibald at the 1911 Kentucky Derby
- Location: Churchill Downs
- Date: May 13, 1911
- Winning horse: Meridian
- Jockey: George Archibald
- Trainer: Albert Ewing
- Owner: Richard F. Carman Sr.
- Surface: Dirt

The 1911 Kentucky Derby was the 37th running of the Kentucky Derby. The race took place on May 13, 1911. Meridian's winning time of 2:05.00 set a new Derby record.

== Full results ==
Finished	Post	Horse	Jockey	Trainer	Owner	Time / behind
1st	5	Meridian	George Archibald	Albert Ewing	Richard F. Carman Sr.	2:05.00
2nd	7	Governor Gray	Roscoe Troxler	James S. Everman	R. N. Smith	3/4
3rd	1	Colston	Jess Conley	Raleigh Colston	Raleigh Colston	15
4th	2	Mud Sill	Ted Koerner	William H. Fizer	J. Hal Woodford & Buckner	2
5th	3	Jack Denman	J. Wilson	George Walker	Francis J. Pons	Head
6th	6	Round the World	Matt McGee	William G. Yanke	William G. Yanke	1
7th	4	Col. Hogan	J. McIntyre	S. Miller Henderson	Henderson & Hogan	15

- Winning Breeder: Charles L. Harrison; (KY)
- Horses Jabot, Ramazan, and Captain Carmody scratched before the race.

== Payout ==
Post	Horse	Win	Place	Show
5	Meridian	$ 7.80	2.70	2.70
7	Governor Gray		2.70	2.60
1	Colston			3.80

- The winner received a purse of $4,850.
- Second place received $700.
- Third place received $300.
