= Hamilton Derby =

- Class: Discontinued stakes
- Location: Hamilton Jockey Club Racetrack, Hamilton, Ontario, Canada
- Inaugurated: 1907
- Race type: Thoroughbred – Flat racing

Race information
- Distance: 1 1/4 miles (10 furlongs; 2,012 m)
- Surface: Dirt
- Track: left-handed
- Qualification: 3-year-old

The Hamilton Derby was a Canadian Thoroughbred horse race first run on June 4, 1907, at the Hamilton Jockey Club Racetrack in Hamilton, Ontario. Open to three-year-old horses of either sex, it was contested over a distance of one and one-quarter miles on dirt.

== Historical notes ==
The first four editions of the Hamilton Derby were won by Canadian-owned horses but passage of the Hart–Agnew anti-betting legislation in 1908 by the New York Legislature led to a compete shutdown of racing in 1911 and 1912 in that state. As a result, American owners began sending horses to compete in Canada and stalls at the Hamilton Jockey Club track were in great demand. The Hamilton Derby of 1911 saw only five starters, all of which were owned by Americans. Leading the way was Kentucky Derby winner Meridian plus the Derby runner-up Governor Gray, Richard Wilson Jr.'s Naushon, as well as the colt Pagod, owned by Lily A. Livingston, the former proprietor of the Rancocas Stud Farm and racing stable. It would be August Belmont Jr.'s Whist who would win the race under jockey Eddie Dugan. With American stables then competing regularly in the Hamilton Derby, it earned a good reputation as confirmed by a March 17, 1914 Daily Racing Form report that it was "always one of the great three-year-old races of the season" in Canada.

== Records ==
Speed record:

- 2:05 flat @ 1¼ : Whist (1911)

Most wins by a jockey:

- no jockey won this race more than once.

Most wins by a trainer:

- 2 – John Whalen (1911, 1913)
- 2 – William H. Bringloe (1921, 1925)

Most wins by an owner:

- 2 – Seagram Stable (1921, 1925)

== Winners ==
Year	Winner	Age	Jockey	Trainer	Owner	Dist. (Miles)	Time	Win$
1926	Token	3	Raymond Peternel	Bert S. Michell	Green Briar Stable (Frank D. Shea)	11/8	1:55.20	$3,540
1925	Edisto	3	Bert Kennedy	William H. Bringloe	Edward F. Seagram	1¼	2:05.60	$
1924	Dixie Smith	3	F. Lee	Preston M. Burch	Preston M. Burch	1¼	2:08.20	$4,590
1923	Caladium	3	Tom Parrington	J. B. Smith	Charles H. Hughes	1¼	2:08.00	$4,700
1922	Spanish Maize	3	Clarence Turner	Henry McDaniel	J. K. L. Ross	1¼	2:06.20	$4,510
1921	Golden Sphere	3	Robert Lancaster	William H. Bringloe	Seagram Stable	1¼	2:05.80	$4,710
1920	Paul Weidel	3	Gorge A. Stack	Mose Lowenstein	Mose & Jake Lowenstein	1¼	2:07.20	$4,480
1919	No races held due to Government wartime rationing.							
1918	No races held due to Government wartime rationing.							
1917	Iron Cross II	3	Roy Estep	E. J. Salt	Capt. W. J. Press	1¼	2:13.80	$3,770
1916	Achievement	3	J. Metcalf	Richard F. Carman Sr.	Wifrid Viau	1¼	2:06.40	$3,760
1915	The Finn	3	George Byrne	Edward W. Heffner	Harry C. Hallenbeck	1¼	2:05.80	$3,630
1914	Sandbar	3	Eddie Ambrose	Michael J. Daly	Michael J. Daly	1¼	2:06.00	$3,310
1913	Buskin	3	Robert M. Small	John Whalen	John Whalen	1¼	2:05.40	$2,290
1912	Froglegs	3	James Butwell	John F. Schorr	John W. Schorr	1¼	2:09.40	$2,530
1911	Whist	3	Eddie Dugan	John Whalen	August Belmont Jr.	1¼	2:05.00	$1,950
1910	Chief Kee	3	Phil Musgrave	Edward Gleason	John Dyment	1¼	2:06.40	$1,950
1909	Detective	3	Dalton McCarthy	Charles Boyle	Woodstock Stable (Charles Boyle)	1¼	2:08.60	$1,450
1908	Uncle Toby	3	Dave Nicol	John Dyment Jr.	John Dyment Sr.	1¼	2:07.40	$1,450
1907	Tourenne	3	Eddie Kunz	Edward Whyte	Kirkfield Stable (Alex Mackenzie)	1¼	2:10.40	$1,450
