= Whist (horse) =

American racehorse

- Sire: Singleton
- Grandsire: St. Simon
- Dam: Wood-Nymph
- Damsire: The Ill-Used
- Sex: Stallion
- Foaled: 1908
- Country: United States
- Colour: Bay
- Breeder: August Belmont Jr.
- Owner: August Belmont Jr.
- Trainer: John Whalen

Major wins
- Hamilton Derby (1911)

Whist (foaled 1908 in Kentucky) was a Thoroughbred race horse bred and raced by August Belmont Jr. The colt came to prime racing age at a turbulent time in American racing and as such is best known for his win in the 1911 Hamilton Derby in Ontario, Canada in which he defeated both the Kentucky Derby winner Meridian and the runner-up, Governor Gray.

As a two-year-old competing in the United States in 1910, Whist's best performance in a stakes race was a second to Stinger in the Pimlico Nursery Stakes.

As a three-year-old, Whist faced a shortage of races in which to compete as a result of the 1911 shutdown of all racetracks in New York State induced by the 1908 enactment of the Hart–Agnew anti-betting legislation. As a consequence, many American owners began sending horses to compete in Canada where stall space would soon be in short supply. Prior to winning the Hamilton Derby, trainer John Whalen had shipped the Belmont stable to Blue Bonnets Raceway in Montreal where Whist set a new Canadian record of 1:38 flat in winning a one-mile race on dirt.

Whilst's racing career ended with his unexpected death later in 1911.
