= 1897 Kentucky Derby =

Horse race

23rd Kentucky Derby
- Kentucky Derby
- Grade I stakes race
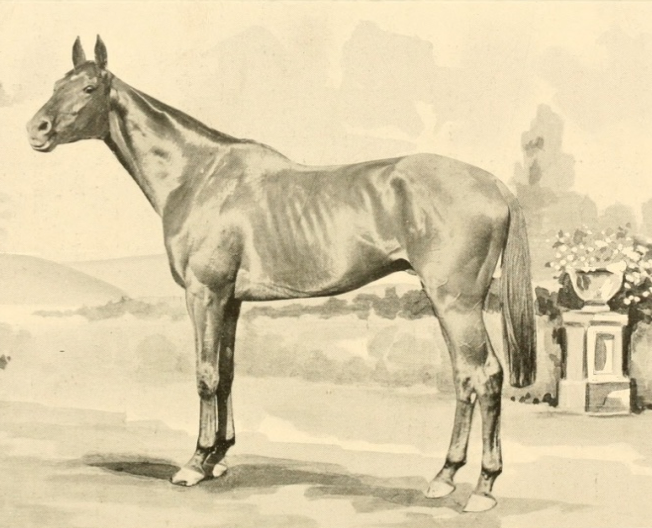
- Typhoon II, the winner of the 1897 Kentucky Derby
- Location: Churchill Downs
- Date: May 12, 1897
- Winning horse: Typhoon II
- Jockey: Buttons Garner
- Trainer: Julius C. Cahn
- Owner: Julius C. Cahn
- Surface: Dirt

The 1897 Kentucky Derby was the 23rd running of the Kentucky Derby. The race took place on May 12, 1897.

== Full results ==
Finished	Post	Horse	Jockey	Trainer	Owner	Time / behind
1st		Typhoon II	Fred Garner	Julius C. Cahn	Julius C. Cahn	2:12.50
2nd		Ornament	Alonzo Clayton	Charles T. Patterson	Charles T. Patterson & Co.	Neck
3rd		Dr. Catlett	Robert Williams		Turney Bros.	20
4th		Dr. Shepard	John Hill		Foster Bros.	4
5th		Goshen	Walter Wilhite		John Rodegap	
6th		Ben Brown	S. Ballard		Charles Fleischmann	

- Winning Breeder: John B. Ewing; (TN)

== Payout ==
- The winner received a purse of $4,850.
- Second place received $700.
- Third place received $300.
