= Meridian (horse) =

American-bred Thoroughbred racehorse

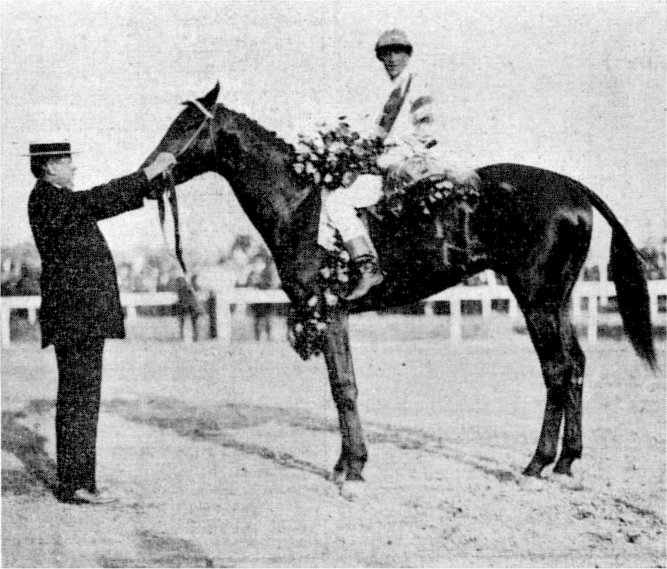
- Meridian with R.F. Carman and jockey Archibald at 1911 Kentucky Derby.
- Sire: Broomstick
- Grandsire: Ben Brush
- Dam: Sue Smith
- Damsire: Masetto
- Sex: Stallion
- Foaled: 1908
- Country: United States
- Colour: Bay
- Breeder: Charles Leonard Harrison
- Owner: 1. Charles L. Harrison; 2. Richard F. Carman; 3. William M. Garth
- Trainer: Albert Ewing
- Record: 66: 20-15-10
- Earnings: $26,491

Major wins
- National Handicap (1911); Frontier Stakes (1911); Washington's Birthday Handicap (1912); Argyle Hotel Handicap (1912); Kentucky Stakes (1912); Excelsior Handicap (1913); American Classics wins: Kentucky Derby (1911)

Awards
- American Champion Three-Year-Old Colt (1911); American Horse of the Year (1911)
- Last updated on March 25, 2020

Meridian (1908–1935) was an American Thoroughbred racehorse that won the 1911 Kentucky Derby, setting a new record by running 1 1/4 miles in 2 minutes, 5 seconds. The previous record of 2:06 1/4 had been set by Lieut. Gibson in the 1900 Derby. Meridian was determined to be the historical Champion Three-Year Old and Horse of the Year of 1911.

== Pedigree ==
Meridian was foaled at Charles L. Harrison's farm in Bellevue, Kentucky in 1908. Charles Harrison (1856–1912) was a civil engineer by trade and was a designer of the Cincinnati and Eastern Railway. Meridian's dam was Sue Smith, winner of the 1905 Astoria Stakes, who was sired by the imported British stallion Masetto. Meridian's sire was Broomstick, son of 1896 Kentucky Derby winner Ben Brush, who was then standing at Samuel Brown's Senorita Stock Farm in Lexington, Kentucky.

== Racing career ==
Meridian won three of his 12 starts as a two-year-old, gaining third place in the 1910 Foam Stakes and second place in the Sheepshead Bay Double Event Stakes while racing for Harrison in New York. Harrison had consigned the Thoroughbred to be sold in a July 1910 sale at the Sheepshead Bay Race Track but withdrew him because the bidding was not high enough. Richard Carman was also at the auction and purchased a horse called The Turk.

Meridian was bought by New Yorker Richard F. Carman as a three-year-old who was eligible to run in the May 13, 1911 Kentucky Derby. Up against a field of seven horses, Meridian started from the fifth post position. A steady contender for most of the race, he was able to outrun a rapidly advancing Governor Gray to earn the win. Racing opportunities were very limited for owners as a result of the Hart–Agnew anti-betting legislation that led to a complete shutdown of racing in New York State in 1911 and 1912. As such, Carman headed north to Canada where at Hamilton, Ontario he ran second in the June 17th Hamilton Derby to the August Belmont Jr. colt Whist. One week later at the same track, Meridian won the National Handicap while setting a new track record for a mile and one-eighth on dirt.

Meridian continued to race until he was six years old before being retired from racing to be used as a breeding stallion by Richard Carman.

== Stud career ==
Richard Carman retired Meridian to his stud farm, called Carmandale, in Silver Spring, Maryland in 1915. His most notable offspring for Carman was the colt Carmandale (b. 1917, out of Daruma) who won the 1919 Whirl Stakes and Wakefield Handicap. Carmandale was a fast runner, but was injured in the Climax Handicap at Havre de Grace Race Track in Maryland on April 21, 1923 and had to be euthanized.

Carmandale Stud was destroyed by an October 3, 1922 fire in which Carman lost 15 pregnant broodmares and 10 foals, which amounted to $95,000. Meridian, The Turk and three mares survived the fire because they were housed in a separate barn. The fire was suspected to be arson, due to Richard Carman disrupting the activities of local rum runners.

Carman sold Meridian in 1923 to horse trainer William Garth, who owned Inglecrest Farm in Charlottesville, Virginia. Paul Jones, the winner of the 1920 Kentucky Derby, was also owned by Garth and was kept at the farm. During the late 1920s, Meridian sired Glen Wild (b. 1926), who won the Riggs Handicap and North Shore Handicap. Meridian died in 1935.

== Pedigree ==
Pedigree of Meridian (bay, 1908)
Sire Broomstick b. 1901	Ben Brush b. 1893	Bramble	Bonnie Scotland
Sire Broomstick b. 1901	Ben Brush b. 1893	Bramble	Ivy Leaf
Sire Broomstick b. 1901	Ben Brush b. 1893	Roseville	Reform
Sire Broomstick b. 1901	Ben Brush b. 1893	Roseville	Albia
Sire Broomstick b. 1901	Elf ch. 1893	Galliard	Galopin*
Sire Broomstick b. 1901	Elf ch. 1893	Galliard	Mavis
Sire Broomstick b. 1901	Elf ch. 1893	Sylvabelle	Bend Or
Sire Broomstick b. 1901	Elf ch. 1893	Sylvabelle	Saint Editha
Dam Sue Smith ch. 1903	Masetto b. 1888	St Simon	Galopin*
Dam Sue Smith ch. 1903	Masetto b. 1888	St Simon	Saint Angela
Dam Sue Smith ch. 1903	Masetto b. 1888	Lady Abbess	Cathedral
Dam Sue Smith ch. 1903	Masetto b. 1888	Lady Abbess	Lady Sophie
Dam Sue Smith ch. 1903	Ethel Lee b. 1894	Whistle Jacket	Hermit
Dam Sue Smith ch. 1903	Ethel Lee b. 1894	Whistle Jacket	Fortress
Dam Sue Smith ch. 1903	Ethel Lee b. 1894	Marmora	Falsetto
Dam Sue Smith ch. 1903	Ethel Lee b. 1894	Marmora	Marmoset

* Merdian is inbred 4S x 4D to the stallion Galopin, meaning that he appears fourth generation on the sire side of his pedigree, and fourth generation on the dam side of his pedigree.
