= Longfellow (horse) =

American thoroughbred racehorse

Longfellow (1867–1893) was an American Thoroughbred Racing horse and sire.

== Background ==
Longfellow was one of the most popular racehorses in the 1870s. Longfellow competed in races between 1870 and 1872, winning 14 of 16 races for a grand total of $11,200 in prize money.

Longfellow was owned, bred, and trained by "Uncle" John Harper of Nantura Stock Farm in Midway, Kentucky. Harper was estimated to be worth one million dollars (a very great sum in the 1850s), yet he lived in a simple cottage on his 1,000 acres (4 km^{2}) adjacent to Robert A. Alexander's famed Woodburn Stud in Woodford County, Kentucky. In 1856, Harper stood both Lexington and Glencoe, two of the country's greatest stallions. Combined, they led America's sire lists for 24 years.

Longfellow was sired by Leamington, the successor of Lexington, as noted: America's leading sire for 14 years. His dam was John Harper's foundation mare Nantura by Brawner's Eclipse. A brown colt with a white stripe, a white near hind sock, and white on his off-hind coronet, Longfellow was foaled in 1867. When people asked Harper, born in 1800, if he had named his colt after the noted poet Henry Wadsworth Longfellow, Harper replied, "Never heard much of that feller but that colt of mine's got the longest legs of any feller I ever seen." At maturity, Longfellow stood 17 hands tall and was said to have a 26-foot stride.

Longfellow was unraced at two while he matured into his size. Harper tried him out in the spring of his third year, entering him in the Phoenix Hotel Stakes—but he was green. He lost to another son of Leamington called Enquirer, who had an undefeated season.

== Racing career ==
In 1871, Longfellow was entered in a match race at Lexington, Kentucky against a horse called Pilgrim. On the night before the race, Harper slept at Longfellow's head in a barn at the old Kentucky Association track. In the middle of the night, Harper was awakened by a rattling at the locked barn door. An unseen man asked to see Longfellow, but Harper ordered him to leave. Early the next morning came the news that Harper's sister Betsy and his brother Jacob, also both elderly, had been murdered in John's small cottage at Nantura. They had been hacked to death by a hatchet. All three were childless. If John had been home that night and was killed along with his brother and sister, the estate would have been divided among several nephews. It was suspected that a nephew named Adam Harper had committed the murders. Wallace Harper, another nephew, openly accused Adam of the crimes. Even though considerable evidence was mounted against Adam Harper, he was never charged. Upon his death, Harper (who had had Adam investigated privately, but never revealed the results) left the homestead and his horse stock to another nephew, Frank B. Harper.

"Ole Longfellow! Thah's a hoss 'At I des p'nounce The Boss...nuthin' like him anywhere, Skims the earth or flies the air!"

— James Whitcomb Riley

Longfellow's real racing career began in the autumn of 1871. In sixteen starts, he won thirteen races, including the Monmouth Cup (beating Helmbold and Preakness), and the Saratoga Cup in 1871. In the Saratoga, only one horse ran against him: Kingfisher. In his next race, he lost to Helmbold, the horse he had easily beaten in the Monmouth Cup. Longfellow's great size proved a disadvantage at 4 miles in deep mud. He took the Wooley Stakes and again won the Monmouth in 1872 and placed in the Saratoga Cup in 1872.

Called "King of the Turf," Longfellow was America's most popular horse in the decade after the American Civil War. His final season was noted for his rivalry with the eastern champion Harry Bassett, winner of the 1871 Travers Stakes in Saratoga Springs, New York. Colonel McDaniel, Harry Bassett's owner, challenged Longfellow to a match race. John Harper replied that anyone wishing to test Longfellow's mettle could do so in the Monmouth Cup of 1872. McDaniel entered his horse. Longfellow headed east in a special car on which a sign was hung that read: "Longfellow on his way to Long Branch to meet his friend Harry Bassett." Since all ten of the other entered horses had withdrawn from the race, it became a match. Longfellow beat Harry by over 100 yards.

Their second meeting was in the 2 1/4-mile Saratoga Cup. Approaching the start, Longfellow struck his left forefoot and twisted his racing plate. Coming around the first turn, it was obvious something was wrong with him, but his rider stood up in his stirrups and whipped the four-year-old colt for the first time in his career. Responding with a powerful surge, for 18 furlongs Longfellow closed the distance and lost to Harry Bassett (who'd broken the track record by 2 1/2 seconds) by one length, leaving the track limping on three legs. His left front foot had been mutilated; the shoe had bent double during the race and embedded itself into the frog of his foot. This was Longfellow's last race.

== Stud record ==
Longfellow sired two Kentucky Derby winners: Leonatus (who ate the roses presented as a prize) in the ninth running in 1883, and Riley in the sixteenth running in 1890. Leonatus was the champion three-year-old male in 1883, losing only one race as a juvenile and never again beaten. As a three-year-old, and within a period of 49 days, Leonatus won ten stakes races, all in Kentucky and Illinois. Among his fillies, he sired two Kentucky Oaks winners: Longitude in 1880, and Florimore in 1887.

A leading sire in 1891, Longfellow produced progeny that included the racemare Thora, champion three-year-old female in 1881 and herself dam of Yorkville Belle (born in Tennessee in 1889, who made 37 starts, and came in the money 30 times with 21 victories). Thora won the Alabama Stakes, the Monmouth Oaks, and the Saratoga Cup. Longfellow also sired The Bard, the champion three-year-old male of 1886 and winner of the Preakness. Later, his get included American Derby winner Pink Coat, Suburban Handicap winner Tillo, 1889 Travers Stakes winner Long Dance, Longstreet, who was the 1891 American Horse of the Year, and the very good mares Peg Woffington and Lady Longfellow.

Longfellow died on November 5, 1893, at the age of twenty-six. His grave marker is the second ever erected for a racehorse in Kentucky. (The first was for Hall of Famer Ten Broeck.) On Longfellow's marker are engraved the words: "King of Racers & King of Stallions."

New Jersey's Monmouth Park runs the $60,000 5 1/2-furlong Longfellow Stakes for three-year-olds and up each year in June.

Longfellow was inducted into the National Museum of Racing and Hall of Fame in Saratoga Springs, New York, in 1971.

== Sire line tree ==
- Longfellow
  - Leonard
  - Longtaw
    - Sam Corey
  - Passaic
  - Freeland
  - Leonatus
    - Tillo
    - Pink Coat
      - Pink Star
  - The Bard
    - Gold Heels
  - Long Dance
  - Longstreet
    - The Parader
    - Stone Street
  - Riley
  - Wadsworth
    - Stonewood

== Pedigree ==
Pedigree of Longfellow
Sire Leamington 1853	Faugh-a-Ballagh; 1841	Sir Hercules	Whalebone
Sire Leamington 1853	Faugh-a-Ballagh; 1841	Sir Hercules	Peri
Sire Leamington 1853	Faugh-a-Ballagh; 1841	Guiccioli	Bob Booty
Sire Leamington 1853	Faugh-a-Ballagh; 1841	Guiccioli	Flight
Sire Leamington 1853	Pantaloon Mare; 1841	Pantaloon	Castrel
Sire Leamington 1853	Pantaloon Mare; 1841	Pantaloon	Idalia
Sire Leamington 1853	Pantaloon Mare; 1841	Daphne	Laurel
Sire Leamington 1853	Pantaloon Mare; 1841	Daphne	Maid of Honor
Dam Nantura 1855	Eclipse (Brawner)	American Eclipse	Duroc*
Dam Nantura 1855	Eclipse (Brawner)	American Eclipse	Millers Damsel
Dam Nantura 1855	Eclipse (Brawner)	John Henry Mare	Henry*
Dam Nantura 1855	Eclipse (Brawner)	John Henry Mare	Young Romp*
Dam Nantura 1855	Quiz; 1836	Bertrand	Sir Archy*
Dam Nantura 1855	Quiz; 1836	Bertrand	Eliza
Dam Nantura 1855	Quiz; 1836	Lady Fortune	Brimmer
Dam Nantura 1855	Quiz; 1836	Lady Fortune	Buzzard Mare (Family: A-14)

* Longfellow is inbred 4D x 5D to the stallion Duroc, meaning that he appears fourth generation on the sire side of his pedigree, and fifth generation (via Young Romp) on the dam side of his pedigree.

* Longfellow is inbred 5D x 4D to the stallion Sir Archy, meaning that he appears fifth generation (via Henry) on the sire side of his pedigree, and fourth generation on the dam side of his pedigree.

== Footnotes ==
1. Out of the Irish stallion Faugh-a-Ballagh, Leamington sired Aristides, first winner of the Kentucky Derby, and Iroquois, the first American-bred winner of The Derby.
2. Harper named his farm after her.

== See also ==
- List of racehorses
