= 1904 Kentucky Derby =

Horse race

30th Kentucky Derby
- Kentucky Derby
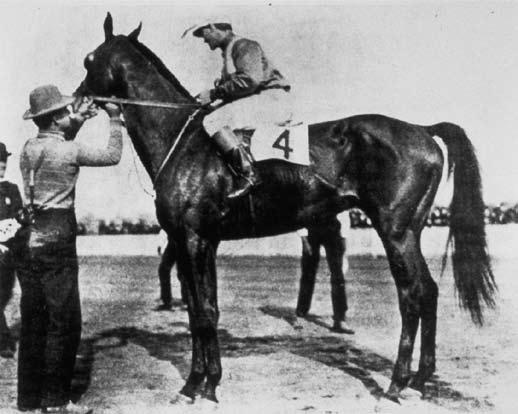
- 1904 Kentucky Derby winner Elwood
- Location: Churchill Downs
- Date: May 2, 1904
- Winning horse: Elwood
- Jockey: Shorty Prior
- Trainer: Charles E. Durnell
- Owner: Lasca Durnell
- Surface: Dirt

The 1904 Kentucky Derby was the 30th running of the Kentucky Derby. The race took place on May 2, 1904. This year in Derby history is notable for several important firsts. Elwood, the winning horse, was owned by Lasca Durnell which marked the first time a female owner won the Derby. The winner was bred by Emma Holt Prather of Faustiana Stock Farm in Nodaway County, Missouri and was the first time a Derby winner was bred by a woman. In addition, Elwood was the first winner bred in the state of Missouri and through 2020 no other winner has been bred in that state.

== Full results ==
Finished	Post	Horse	Jockey	Trainer	Owner	Time / behind
1st		Elwood	Frank Prior	Charles E. Durnell	Lasca Durnell	2:08.50
2nd		Ed Tierney	Joseph Dominick	John Fay	John Fay & Henry Wehmhoff	1/2
3rd		Brancas	Lucien Lyne	William McDaniel	William Gerst	3
4th		Prince Silverwings	Dale Austin	T. Hart Talbot	Talbot Bros.	2 1/2
5th		Proceeds	George Helgeson	Robert Tucker	Samuel S. Brown	1

- Winning Breeder: Emma Holt Prather; (MO)

== Payout ==
- The winner received a purse of $4,850.
- Second place received $700.
- Third place received $300.
