= Montrose (horse) =

American Thoroughbred racehorse

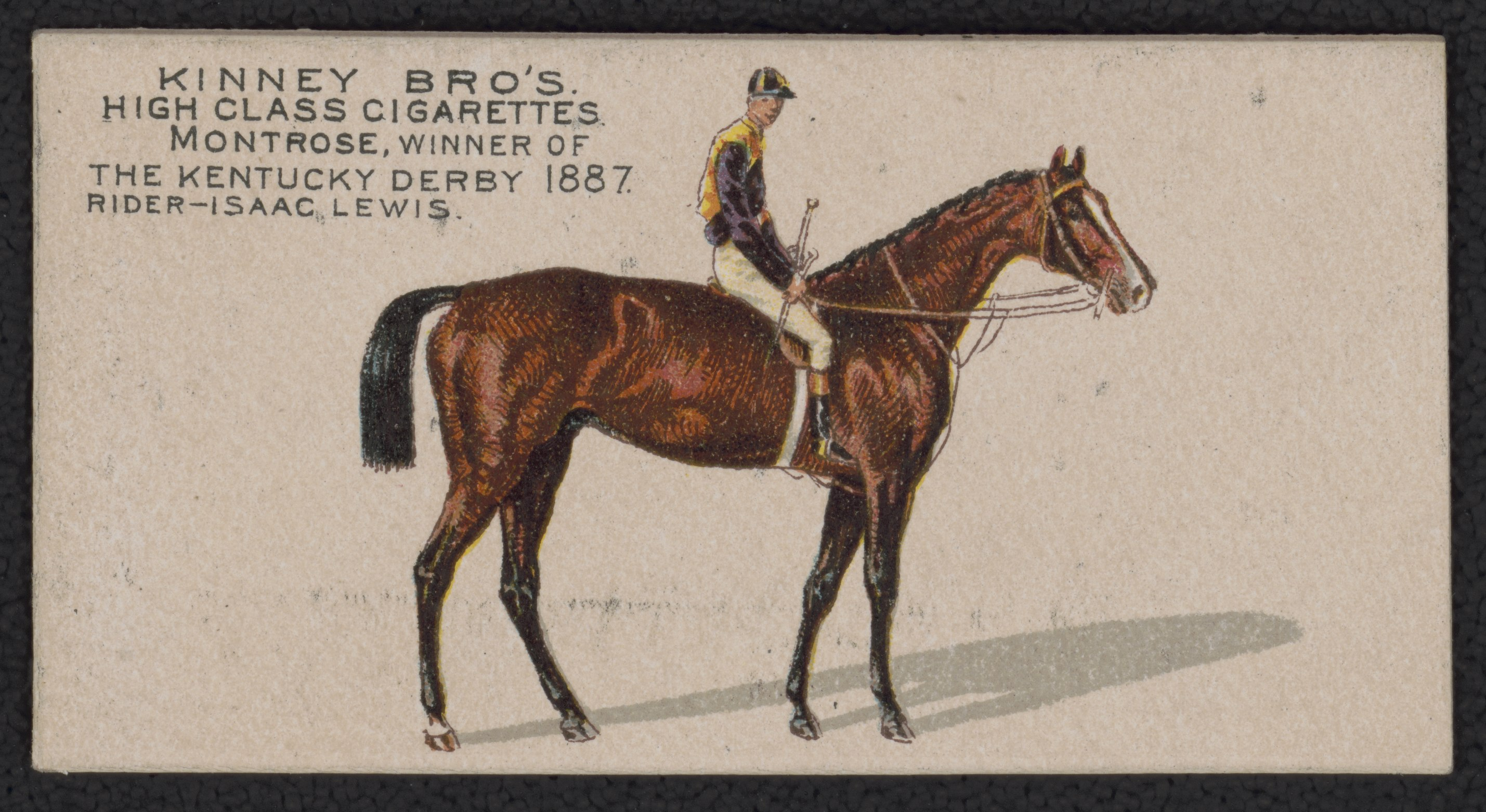
- Sire: Duke of Montrose
- Grandsire: Waverly
- Dam: Patti
- Damsire: Billet (GB)
- Sex: Stallion
- Foaled: 1884
- Country: United States
- Color: Bay
- Breeder: Col. Milton Young (McGrathiana Stud)
- Owner: Alexander & Ike Labold
- Trainer: John McGinty
- Record: 51: 14-11-9
- Earnings: $27,321

Major wins
- Morrissey Stakes (1888); Great Western Handicap (1888); Kearney Stakes (1889); American Classic Race wins: Kentucky Derby (1887)

Montrose (1884 – 1898) was an American Thoroughbred racehorse that is best remembered for winning the 1887 Kentucky Derby. He was bred in Kentucky at Col. Milton Young's McGrathiana Stud and purchased by the Labold brothers from Cincinnati, Ohio. Ridden by African American Isaac Lewis in the Derby, the colt was trained by former jockey John McGinty.

Montrose also won the Morrissey Stakes and Great Western Handicap when he was a four-year-old and won the Kearney Stakes run in Saratoga Springs, New York as a five-year-old. Montrose died on July 30, 1898, at the age of 14 years at the farm of Allen W. Thurman in Columbus, Ohio.

== Pedigree ==
Pedigree of Montrose
Sire Duke of Montrose 1877	Waverly 1870	Australian	West Australian
Sire Duke of Montrose 1877	Waverly 1870	Australian	Emilia
Sire Duke of Montrose 1877	Waverly 1870	Cicily Jopson	Weatherbit
Sire Duke of Montrose 1877	Waverly 1870	Cicily Jopson	Cestrea
Sire Duke of Montrose 1877	Kelpie 1866	Bonnie Scotland	Iago
Sire Duke of Montrose 1877	Kelpie 1866	Bonnie Scotland	Queen Mary
Sire Duke of Montrose 1877	Kelpie 1866	Sister to Ruric	Sovereign
Sire Duke of Montrose 1877	Kelpie 1866	Sister to Ruric	Levity
Dam Patti Unknown	Billet 1865	Voltigeur	Voltaire
Dam Patti Unknown	Billet 1865	Voltigeur	Martha Lynn
Dam Patti Unknown	Billet 1865	Calcutta	Flatcatcher
Dam Patti Unknown	Billet 1865	Calcutta	Miss Martin
Dam Patti Unknown	Dora 1873	Pat Malloy	Lexington
Dam Patti Unknown	Dora 1873	Pat Malloy	Gloriana
Dam Patti Unknown	Dora 1873	Etta Jr	Bill Alexander
Dam Patti Unknown	Dora 1873	Etta Jr	Etta
