= 1882 Kentucky Derby =

Horse race

8th Kentucky Derby
- Kentucky Derby
- Grade I stakes race
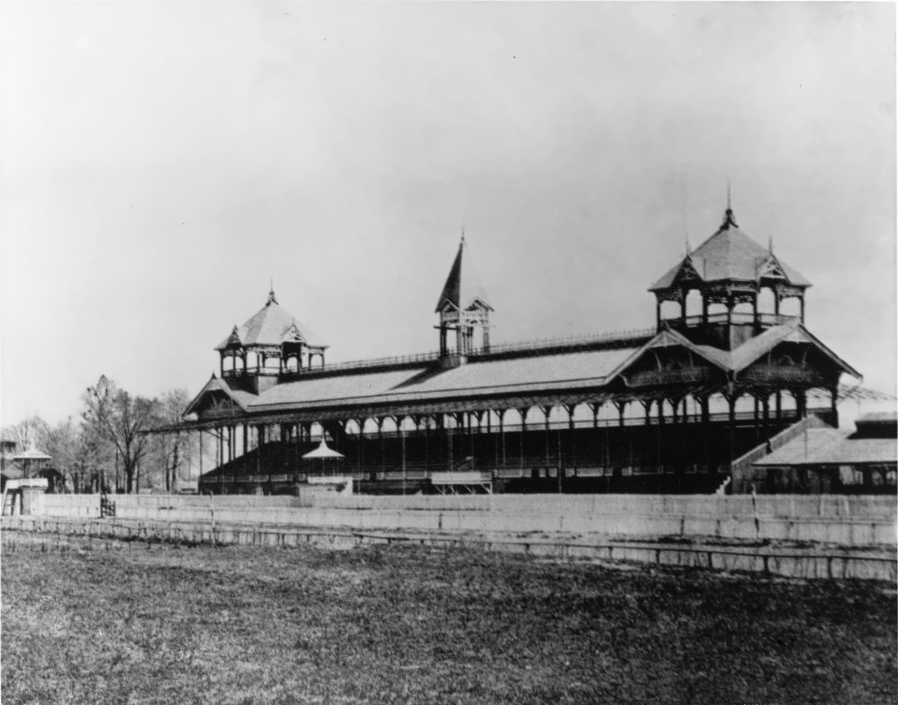
- Original grandstands at the Louisville Jockey Club grounds
- Location: Churchill Downs
- Date: May 16, 1882
- Winning horse: Apollo
- Jockey: Babe Hurd
- Trainer: Green B. Morris
- Owner: Morris & Patton
- Surface: Dirt

The 1882 Kentucky Derby was the 8th running of the Kentucky Derby. The race took place on May 16, 1882, at what was then called the Louisville Jockey Club grounds.

== Full results ==
Finished	Post	Horse	Jockey	Trainer	Owner	Time / behind
1st		Apollo	Babe Hurd	Green B. Morris	Green B. Morris & James D. Patton	2:40.25
2nd		Runnymede	Jim McLaughlin		Dwyer Brothers Stable	
3rd		Bengal	T. Fisher		G.W. Bowen & Co.	
4th		Harry Gilmore	Gibbs		William Cottrill	
5th		Babcock	M. Kelso		William Lakeland	
6th		Monogram	B. Edwards		Milton Young	
7th		Highflyer	Brown		G. Kuhn & Co.	
8th		Wendover	Hovey		J.B. Sellers & Co.	
9th		Pat Mallow colt	E. Henderson		P.C. Fox	
10th		Wallensee	L. Parker		Rodes & Carr	
11th		Newsboy	B. Quantrell		Thomas Jefferson Megibben	
12th		Mistral	John Stoval		L. P. Tarlton	
13th		Lost Cause	C. Taylor		Milton Young	
14th		Robert Bruce	L. Jones		A. Jackson	

== Payout ==
Post	Horse	Win	Place	Show
	Apollo	$ 169.80		
	Runnymede		$8.50	

- The winner received a purse of $4,560.
- Second place received $200.
