= 1887 Kentucky Derby =

Horse race

13th Kentucky Derby
- Kentucky Derby
- Grade I stakes race
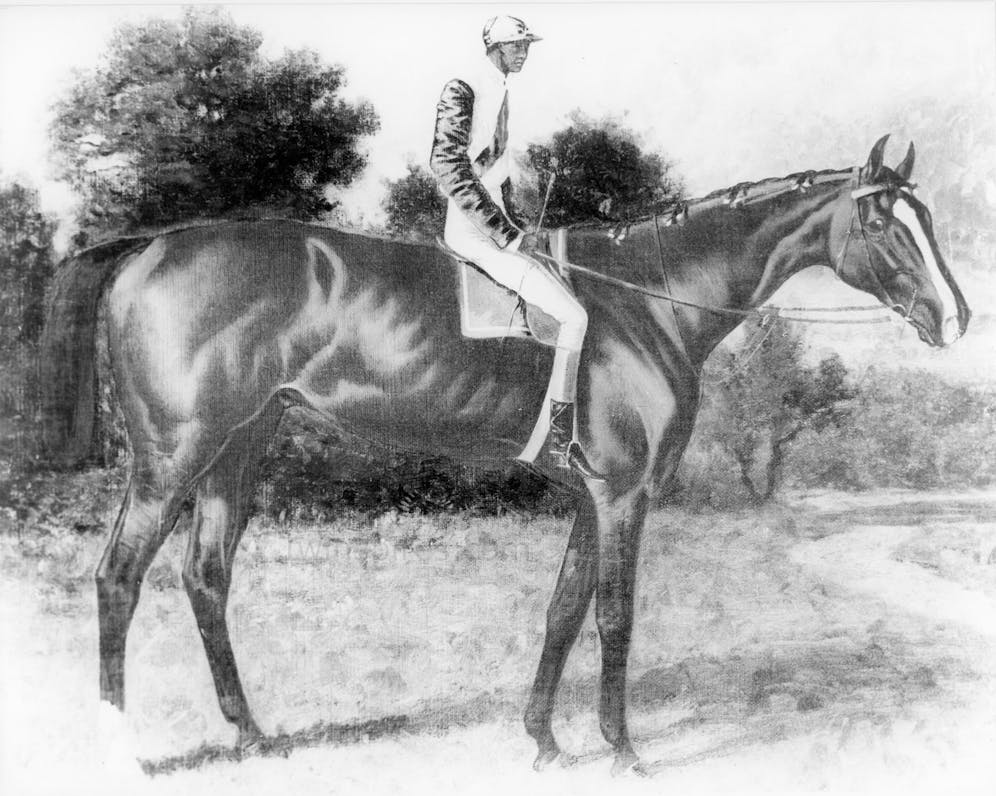
- Montrose, winner of the 1887 Kentucky Derby
- Location: Churchill Downs
- Date: May 11, 1887
- Winning horse: Montrose
- Jockey: Isaac Lewis
- Trainer: John McGinty
- Owner: Labold Bros.
- Surface: Dirt

The 1887 Kentucky Derby was the 13th running of the Kentucky Derby. The race took place on May 11, 1887.

== Full results ==
Finished	Post	Horse	Jockey	Trainer	Owner	Time / behind
1st	7	Montrose	Isaac E. Lewis	John McGinty	Labold Bros. (Alexander S. & Isaac Labold)	2:39.25
2nd	5	Jim Gore	William J. Fitzpatrick		Amos G. McCampbell	2
3rd	3	Jackobin	John Stoval		Robert Lisle	1
4th	2	Banburg	Harry Blaylock	James Murphy	James D. Morrisey	2
5th	1	Clarion	Arnold		Fleetwood Stable	Nose
6th	6	Ban Yan	Godfrey		William O. Scully	
7th	4	Pendennis	Isaac Murphy		Santa Anita Stable	

== Payout ==
- The winner received a purse of $4,200.
- Second place received $300.
- Third place received $150.
