= 1883 Kentucky Derby =

Horse race

9th Kentucky Derby
- Kentucky Derby
- Grade I stakes race
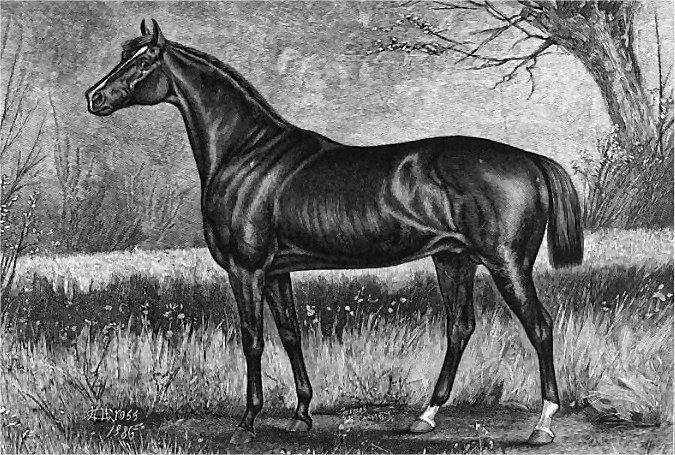
- 1883 Kentucky Derby winner Leonatus in an 1886 engraving by Henry H. Cross
- Location: Churchill Downs
- Date: May 23, 1883
- Winning horse: Leonatus
- Jockey: William Donohue
- Trainer: Raleigh Colston Sr.
- Owner: Jack P. Chinn & George W. Morgan
- Surface: Dirt

The 1883 Kentucky Derby was the 9th running of the Kentucky Derby. The race took place on May 23, 1883. An article in the Louisville Commercial about the 1883 Derby contained the first reference to the track as Churchill Downs.

== Full results ==
Finished	Post	Horse	Jockey	Trainer	Owner	Time / behind
1st		Leonatus	William Donohue	Raleigh Colston Sr.	Jack P. Chinn & George W. Morgan	2:43.00
2nd		Drake Carter	John Spellman	Green B. Morris	Green B. Morris & James D. Patton	
3rd		Lord Raglan	George Quantrell	Dave McDaniel	Noah Armstrong	
4th		Ascender	John Stoval		R. C. Pate	
5th		Standiford Kellar	Harry Blaylock		J. R. Watts	
6th		Pike's Pride	George Evans		Clipsiana Stable	
7th		Chatter	H. Henderson		W. C. McCurdy	

- Winning Breeder: John Henry Miller; (KY)

== Payout ==
Post	Horse	Win	Place	Show
	Leonatus	$ 14.80		

- The winner received a purse of $3,760.
- Second place received $200.
