= 1888 Kentucky Derby =

Horse race

14th Kentucky Derby
- Kentucky Derby
- Grade I stakes race
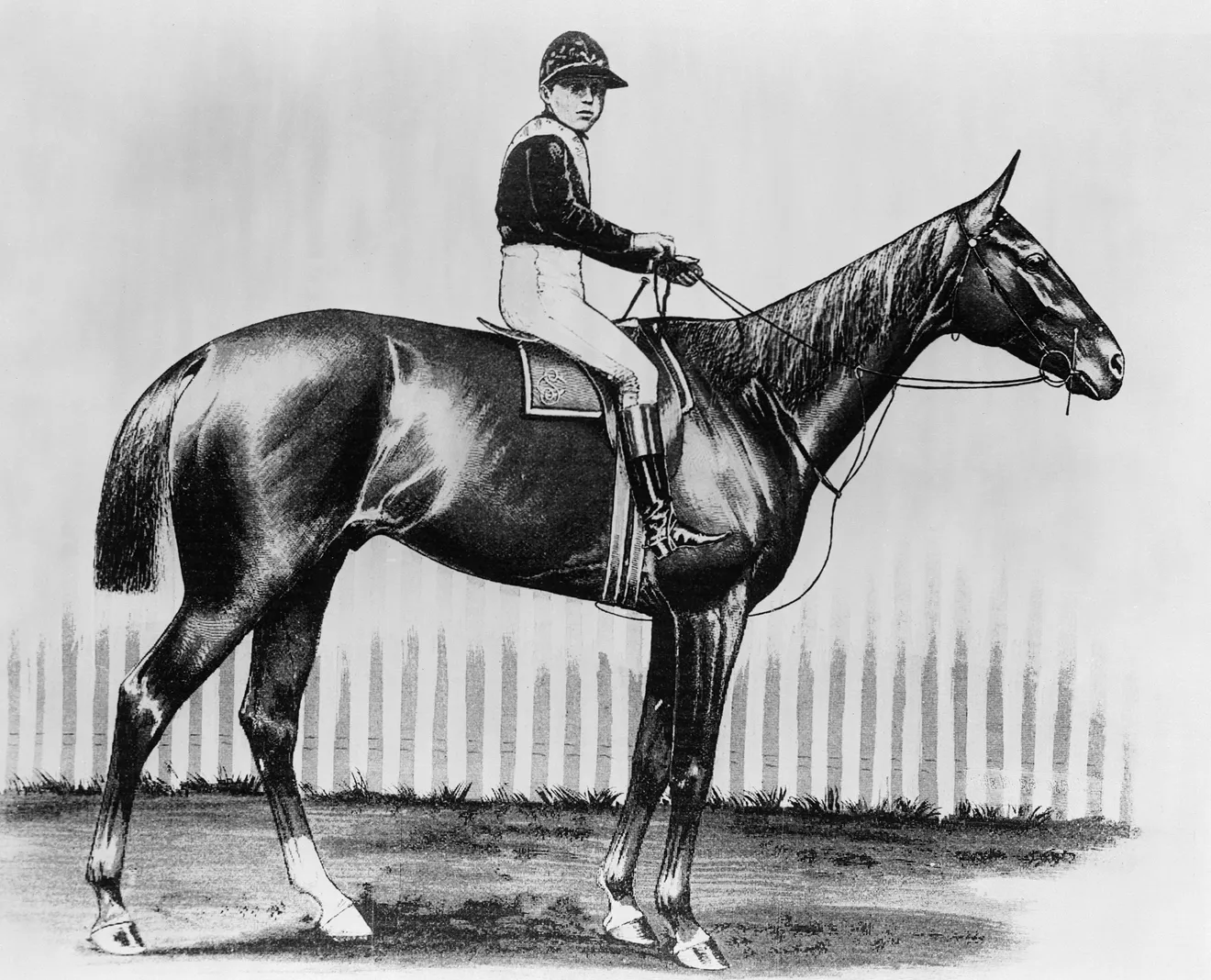
- Winner of the 1888 Kentucky Derby, Macbeth II
- Location: Churchill Downs
- Date: May 14, 1888
- Winning horse: Macbeth II
- Jockey: George Covington
- Trainer: John S. Campbell
- Owner: Chicago Stable
- Surface: Dirt

The 1888 Kentucky Derby was the 14th running of the Kentucky Derby. The race took place on May 14, 1888. The track was labeled as fast.

== Full results ==
Finished	Post	Horse	Jockey	Trainer	Owner	Time / behind
1st	8	Macbeth II	George Covington	John S. Campbell	Chicago Stable	2:38.25
2nd	2	Gallifet	Andrew McCarthy		Melbourne Stable	1
3rd	4	White	T. Withers		W. O. Scully	1
4th	3	Alexandria	L. Jones		Melbourne Stable	2
5th	5	The Chevalier	Isaac E. Lewis		Thomas J. Clay	1/2
6th	7	Autocrat	Anthony Hamilton		D. Gibson	
7th	6	Col. Zeb Ward	Harry Blaylock		G. M. Rye	

== Payout ==
- The winner received a purse of $4,740.
- Second place received $500.
- Third place received $200.
