= William Donohue (jockey) =

Canadian racehorse, jockey, trainer and owner

Personal information
- Born: 1854 Montreal, Canada East
- Died: April 1936 (aged 81–82) Toronto, Ontario, Canada
- Occupations: Jockey, Trainer, Owner

Horse racing career
- Sport: Horse racing

Major racing wins
- As a Jockey: Champagne Stakes (1871, 1874, 1888); Tennessee Stakes (1879); Alabama Stakes (1880, 1881); Mermaid Stakes (1880, 1881, 1884); Surf Stakes (1881); Freehold Stakes (1882, 1883); Autumn Cup Handicap (1883); Monmouth Oaks (1884); Suburban Handicap (1884); Dixie Stakes (1885); Atlantic Stakes (1887); Manhattan Handicap (1887); Omnium Handicap (1894) American Classics wins: Belmont Stakes (1876); Kentucky Derby (1883); Preakness Stakes (1887) As a Trainer: September Stakes (1895); Brighton Handicap (1896); Clarendon Stakes (1927); Durham Cup Stakes (1928); Maple Leaf Stakes (1928); Grey Stakes (1933)

Significant horses
- As a jockey: Algerine, Dunboyne, Horometer, Leonatus, Luke Blackburn, Prince of Melbourne

William J. Donohue (1854 - April, 1936) was a jockey, trainer and owner of Thoroughbred racehorses who competed in his native Canada as well as the United States where he won each of the three races that would become the U. S. Triple Crown series.

== Background ==
In an October 11, 1886 article on famous jockeys, The Daily Alta California said that "The Donohue family is a great one in American racing affairs, but of the lot William Donohue is the best known."

William Donohue's first Classic win came in the June 10, 1876 Belmont Stakes at Jerome Park Racetrack in Westchester County, New York aboard Algerine. His second success in a Classic occurred on May 23, 1883, when he rode Leonatus to victory in the Kentucky Derby at Churchill Downs in Louisville, Kentucky. Donohue got his third Classic with Dunboyne in the Preakness Stakes run on May 13, 1887, at Pimlico Race Course in Baltimore, Maryland.

Among his other important jockey wins, in 1884 William Donohue rode General Monroe to win the inaugural running of the Suburban Handicap, a race that would soon rank as the most important American race open to older horses.

== Jockey, Trainer, Owner ==
During his career in racing William Donohue also trained horses, notably for the family of Canada's preeminent owner, the Seagram Stable. He also acquired horses for his own account and for a number of years could sometimes be found both riding and training a horse for a client or for himself.

In April 1936, William Donohue died in Toronto, Ontario.
