= Leonatus =

American-bred Thoroughbred racehorse

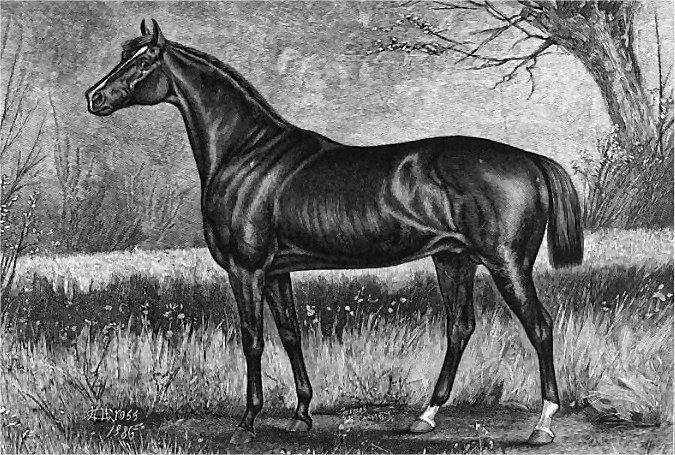
- 1886 engraving by Henry H. Cross
- Sire: Longfellow
- Grandsire: Leamington
- Dam: Semper Felix
- Damsire: Phaeton
- Sex: Stallion
- Foaled: 1880
- Country: USA
- Colour: Bay
- Breeder: John Henry Miller
- Owner: Jack P. Chinn & George W. Morgan
- Trainer: Raleigh Colston Sr. John McGinty
- Record: 11 Starts: 10–1-0
- Earnings: $21,435

Major wins
- Illinois Derby (1883); Hindoo Stakes (1883); Blue Ribbon Stakes (1883); Tobacco Stakes (1883); Woodburn Stakes (1883); Ripple Stakes (1883); Himyar Stakes (1883); Dearborn Stakes (1883); Green Stakes (1883); American Classics wins: Kentucky Derby (1883)

Awards
- American Champion Three-Year-Old Colt (1883)
- Last updated on October 16, 2019

Leonatus (foaled in 1880 in Kentucky, died 1898 in Kentucky) was an American Thoroughbred racehorse who won the 1883 Kentucky Derby.

== Background ==
Leonatus was the son of Uncle John Harper's great racer and sire Longfellow, himself a son of the imported English stud Leamington. Leonatus' dam was the Daniel Swigert-bred Semper Felix, whose dam was by the great nineteenth-century American foundation stallion, Lexington, himself by Boston.

Purchased by the partnership of Jack P. Chinn and George W. Morgan, and thereafter stabled in Mercer County, Kentucky, Leonatus was trained by African American horseman Raleigh Colston Sr. as well as by John McGinty.

Leonatus raced in a new world of English "dash" races on the kind of racetracks we recognize today.

== Racing career ==
Racing only once as juvenile, Leonatus finished second. As a three-year-old, he won ten stakes, all in either Kentucky or Illinois, within the space of 49 days. Although there were no official awards given until 1936, Leonatus was retrospectively chosen the American Champion Three-Year-Old Male Horse of 1883.

Winning the 1883 Kentucky Derby was a major accomplishment. Carrying 105 pounds and the 2-1 favorite, Leonatus was piloted by Billy Donohue, the jockey who'd ridden Sligo in the 1881 Derby, coming in fourth. Running in mud on a clear, cold day, Leonatus was up against the colt Drake Carter, trained by Green B. Morris, who hoped to take his second consecutive Derby (he'd won with Apollo in 1882). Drake Carter leaped into the lead, but Leonatus caught him at a quarter of a mile. A quarter of a mile farther on, Leonatus was ahead by three lengths. In the homestretch, Lord Raglan made a strong bid, but though it carried him forward, he tired. Leonatus won over Drake Carter by three lengths, earning $3,760.

Leonatus distinguished himself by eating the presentation roses. (Blankets of roses were not recorded being draped over the winning horse until 1896, when Ben Brush wore them.)

== Stud record ==
Leonatus was retired to stud at the Clay Brothers' Runnymede Farm near Paris, Kentucky. He remained there until he was eighteen years old, dying in 1898. He proved a fine sire, producing the 1898 American Derby winner Pink Coat and 1898 Suburban Handicap winner Tillo. Leonatus lies in an unmarked grave on a bend of the Elkhorn Creek that runs through Runnymeade Farm. Near him lie Hindoo, Billet, and Sir Dixon.

== Sire line tree ==
- Leonatus
  - Tillo
  - Pink Coat
    - Pink Star

== Pedigree ==
Pedigree of Leonatus
Sire Longfellow 1867	Leamington 1853	Faugh-a-Ballagh	Sir Hercules
Sire Longfellow 1867	Leamington 1853	Faugh-a-Ballagh	Guiccioli
Sire Longfellow 1867	Leamington 1853	Pantaloon Mare	Pantaloon
Sire Longfellow 1867	Leamington 1853	Pantaloon Mare	Daphne
Sire Longfellow 1867	Nantura 1855	Brawner's Eclipse	American Eclipse
Sire Longfellow 1867	Nantura 1855	Brawner's Eclipse	Henry Mare
Sire Longfellow 1867	Nantura 1855	Quiz	Bertrand
Sire Longfellow 1867	Nantura 1855	Quiz	Lady Fortune
Dam Semper Felix 1878	Phaeton 1865	King Tom	Harkaway
Dam Semper Felix 1878	Phaeton 1865	King Tom	Pocahontas*
Dam Semper Felix 1878	Phaeton 1865	Merry Sunshine	Storm
Dam Semper Felix 1878	Phaeton 1865	Merry Sunshine	Falstaff Mare
Dam Semper Felix 1878	Crucifix 1866	Lexington	Boston
Dam Semper Felix 1878	Crucifix 1866	Lexington	Alice Carneal
Dam Semper Felix 1878	Crucifix 1866	Lightsome	Glencoe*
Dam Semper Felix 1878	Crucifix 1866	Lightsome	Levity

* Leonatus is inbred 5D x 4D to the stallion Glencoe, meaning that he appears fifth generation (via Pocahontas) and fourth generation on the dam side of his pedigree.
