= Latonia Derby =

- Class: Discontinued stakes
- Location: Latonia Race Track; Latonia, Kentucky
- Inaugurated: 1883
- Race type: Thoroughbred - Flat racing

Race information
- Distance: 1¼ miles (10 furlongs)
- Track: Dirt, left-handed
- Qualification: Three-years-old
- Purse: $12,800

The Latonia Derby was an American Thoroughbred horse race run annually from 1883 through 1937 at Latonia Race Track in Latonia, Kentucky. Open to three-year-old horses, for its first 52 years the Latonia Derby was contested at a mile and a half then in 1935 the distance was shortened to a mile and a quarter. It was run as the Hindoo Stakes from inception in 1883 to 1886 in honor of the Kentucky-bred U.S. Racing Hall of Fame horse, Hindoo. The race usually attracted the Kentucky Derby winner; it became so popular that in 1912 a motion picture was made by Independent Motion Picture Co. entitled Winning the Latonia Derby, featuring silent film star King Baggot.

The inaugural 1883 Latonia Derby was won by Kentucky Derby winner Leonatus. Future Derby winners Kingman (1891), Halma (1895), Ben Brush (1896), Lieut. Gibson (1900), Elwood (1904) and Sir Huon (1906) also won the race; the 1918 edition was won by Harry Payne Whitney's Belmont Stakes-winning colt, Johren. In 1936, Rushaway won the Illinois Derby during the afternoon, then was shipped 300 miles (480 km) overnight to win the Latonia Derby the following afternoon.

== Records ==
Speed record:

- 1¼ miles (1935–1937) : 2:02 3/5 - Rushaway (1936)
- 1½ miles (1883–1934) : 2:28 3/5 - Handy Mandy (1927)

Most wins by a jockey:

- 5 - Isaac Murphy (1883, 1885, 1886, 1887, 1891)

Most wins by a trainer: ¹

- 2 - Albert Cooper (1886, 1888)
- 2 - Robert Tucker (1893, 1901)
- 2 - Peter W. Coyne (1906, 1912)
- 2 - Auval John Baker (1910, 1914)
- 2 - Kay Spence (1923, 1930)
- ¹ At present, one trainer is missing from the table's list.

Most wins by an owner:

- 2 - E. J. "Lucky" Baldwin (1886, 1888)
- 2 - Scoggan Brothers (1889, 1893)
- 2 - Bashford Manor Stable (1906–1912)
- 2 - Harry P. Whitney (1918, 1920)
- 2 - Audley Farm Stable (1923, 1930)
- 2 - Edward R. Bradley (1925, 1926)

== Winners ==
Year	Winner	Jockey	Trainer	Owner	Dist. (Miles)	Time	Win$
1937	Reaping Reward	Alfred M. Robertson	Robert McGarvey	Milky Way Farm Stable	11/4 M	2:03.80	$12,800
1936	Rushaway	Johnny Longden	Alfred G. Tarn	Alfred G. Tarn	11/4 M	2:02.60	$12,125
1935	Tearout	William Hanka	Howard Wells	Daniel B. Midkiff	11/4 M	2:04.00	$12,680
1934	Fiji	Gilbert Elston	Tom B. Young	Young Brothers	11/2 M	2:31.80	$7,980
1933	Gold Basis	Gilbert Elston	Max Hirsch	Morton L. Schwartz	11/2 M	2:31.20	$7,750
1932	Stepenfetchit	Robert Finnerty	James W. Healy	Liz Whitney	11/2 M	2:31.20	$11,360
1931	Spanish Play	Charles Landolt	George Land	Charles H. Knebelkamp & Richard Morris	11/2 M	2:30.00	$22,575
1930	Gallant Knight	Herman Schutte	Kay Spence	Audley Farm Stable	11/2 M	2:35.00	$22,175
1929	Buddy Basil	Dunice Dubois	William F. Polson	Basil Manor Stable	11/2 M	2:30.40	$23,075
1928	Toro	Eddie Ambrose	John F. Schorr	Edward Beale McLean	11/2 M	2:41.20	$22,525
1927	Handy Mandy	Earl Pool	Walter W. Taylor	Hal Price Headley	11/2 M	2:28.60	$24,250
1926	Bagenbaggage	Eric Blind	William A. Hurley	Edward R. Bradley	11/2 M	2:32.20	$24,500
1925	Broadway Jones	Hurley Meyer	Herbert J. Thompson	Edward R. Bradley	11/2 M	2:31.00	$25,225
1924	Chilhowee	Lawrence McDermott	John C. Gallaher	Gallaher Bros.	11/2 M	2:30.20	$25,600
1923	The Clown	Harry Lunsford	Kay Spence	Audley Farm Stable	11/2 M	2:32.60	$15650
1922	Thibodaux	Earl Pool	William Perkins	William Perkins	11/2 M	2:33.80	$14,625
1921	Brother Batch	Mack Garner	Charles C. Van Meter	E. C. Arnold	11/2 M	2:47.60	$14,900
1920	Upset	José Rodriguez	S. Abner Clopton	Harry P. Whitney	11/2 M	2:32.00	$16,300
1919	Be Frank	Clarence Kummer	William Jennings Jr.	Cornelius M. Garrison	11/2 M	2:37.60	$16,160
1918	Johren	Frank Robinson	Albert Simons	Harry P. Whitney	11/2 M	2:33.00	$9,925
1917	Liberty Loan	Johnny Loftus	John W. May	A. Kingsley Macomber	11/2 M	2:30.80	$9,550
1916	Dodge	Frank Murphy	John S. Ward	Weber & Ward	11/2 M	2:37.00	$9,950
1915	Royal	Carl Ganz	Herman R. Brandt	Jefferson Livingston	11/2 M	2:32.00	$10,125
1914	John Gund	Andy Neylon	Auval John Baker	A. Baker & Co.	11/2 M	2:30.40	$6,025
1913	Gowell	Fred Teahan	Jack T. Weaver	Jack T. Weaver	11/2 M	2:33.20	$5,725
1912	Free Lance	Charles Peak	Peter W. Coyne	Bashford Manor Stable	11/2 M	2:31.00	$4,250
1911	Governor Gray	Ted Rice	James S. Everman	R. N. Smith & Co.	11/2 M	2:30.40	$3,550
1910	Joe Morris	Charles Grand	Auval John Baker	Robert H. Anderson	11/2 M	2:33.40	$2,925
1909	Olambala	Ted Rice	Roy Cassady	John G. Greener	11/2 M	2:39.20	$3,095
1908	Pinkola	Andy Minder	William H. Fizer	William H. Fizer	11/2 M	2:35.40	$3,655
1907	The Abbot	James Lee	William J. Young	William J. Young	11/2 M	2:46.20	$4,410
1906	Sir Huon	Roscoe Troxler	Peter W. Coyne	Bashford Manor Stable	11/2 M	2:36.80	$5,095
1905	The Foreman	John K. Treubel	John Walters	George M. Hendrie	11/2 M	2:38.00	$5,950
1904	Elwood	Frank Prior	Charles E. Durnell	Lasca Durnell	11/2 M	2:42.75	$5,730
1903	Woodlake	Richard Crowhurst	Thomas C. McDowell	Thomas C. McDowell	11/2 M	2:36.75	$7,035
1902	Harry New	Phillip J. Otis	John P. Mayberry	Charles R. Ellison	11/2 M	2:38.75	$4,390
1901	Hernando	Jimmy Winkfield	Robert Tucker	W. H. Laudeman	11/2 M	2:35.25	$4,985
1900	Lieut. Gibson*	Jimmy Boland	Charles Hughes	Charles H. Smith	11/2 M	0:00.00	$4,715
1899	Prince McClurg	William Beauchamp	James H. McAvoy	J. H. McAvoy & W. E. Applegate	11/2 M	2:36.20	$6,825
1898	Han d'Or	Jess Conley	Crit Davis	T. H. Coleman Jr.	11/2 M	2:32.50	$7,620
1897	Ornament	Alonzo Clayton	Charles T. Patterson	Charles T. Patterson	11/2 M	2:35.25	$8,740
1896	Ben Brush	Willie Simms	Hardy Campbell Jr.	Michael F. Dwyer	11/2 M	2:40.50	$12,200
1895	Halma	Charles Thorpe	Thomas Welsh	Charles Fleischmann & Sons	11/2 M	2:34.50	$6,720
1894	Lazzarone	Willie Martin	H. Eugene Leigh	H. E. Leigh & Robert L. Rose	11/2 M	2:51.00	$6,555
1893	Buck McCann	Charles Thorpe	Robert Tucker	Scoggan Brothers	11/2 M	2:44.00	$4,450
1892	Newton	Alonzo Clayton	John T. Ireland	Ireland Bros. (Frank & John T.)	11/2 M	3:14.00	$3,700
1891	Kingman	Isaac Murphy	Dudley Allen	Jacobin Stable (Kinzea Stone & Dudley Allen)	11/2 M	2:45.25	$4,540
1890	Bill Letcher	Alonzo Allen	William R. Letcher	William R. Letcher	11/2 M	2:43.00	$5,380
1889	Hindoocraft	Hollis	Enoch Wishard	Scoggan Brothers	11/2 M	2:41.00	$4,300
1888	Los Angeles**	Armstrong	Albert Cooper	E. J. "Lucky" Baldwin	11/2 M	2:39.25	$4,270
1887	Libretto	Isaac Murphy		Frank B. Harper	11/2 M	2:38.25	$4,390
1886	Silver Cloud	Isaac Murphy	Albert Cooper	E. J. "Lucky" Baldwin	11/2 M	2:40.00	$3,810
1885	Bersan	Isaac Murphy	Green B. Morris	G. B. Morris & James D. Patton	11/2 M	2:42.75	$4,080
1884	Audrain	Richard Fishburn	J. Beck	Thomas Jefferson Megibben	11/2 M	2:42.00	$3,860
1883	Leonatus	Isaac Murphy	Raleigh Colston Sr.	Jack P. Chinn & George W. Morgan	11/2 M	2:40.50	$2,850

- * 1900: Walkover, no time taken.
- ** 1888: Dead Heat runoff won by Los Angeles over White.
