= Arthur Pickens =

American jockey

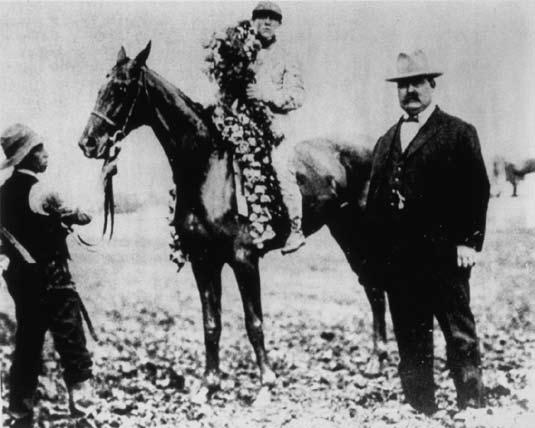
- Arthur Pickens aboard Stone Street, May 5, 1908

Personal information
- Born: July 8, 1888 Norwood, Ohio, United States
- Died: January 16, 1944 (aged 55)
- Occupation: Jockey

Horse racing career
- Sport: Horse racing
- Career wins: 1,055

Major racing wins
- Breeders' Stakes (1916); Coronation Futurity Stakes (1916); Long Beach Handicap (1917); Tuckahoe Handicap (1919); Yonkers Handicap (1919); Grand National Handicap (1920); D&C Handicap (1922) American Classic Race wins: Kentucky Derby (1908) Canadian Classic Race wins: King's Plate (1916); Breeders' Stakes (1916)

Significant horses
- Mandarin, Stone Street, The Finn

Arthur Pickens (July 8, 1888 – January 16, 1944) was an American Thoroughbred horse racing jockey who won the most prestigious race in both the United States and Canada. In 1916 Pickens won two of the three races that would later be part of the Canadian Triple Crown series. His wins came aboard distiller Joseph Seagram's colt Mandarin in the 1916 Breeders' Stakes and in Canada's most prestigious race, the King's Plate. That year he also won the Coronation Futurity Stakes for the Seagram Stable. Among his other accomplishments in racing, on May 28, 1918, he rode four winners at Prospect Park Fair Grounds on Coney Island, New York. In winters he rode at Oriental Park Racetrack in Havana, Cuba, where in 1924 he was one of the track's top jockeys.

Arthur Pickens died at age 55 in Maysville, Kentucky, where he and his wife Lillian Webster Pickens made their home. He is buried in the Maysville Cemetery.

In 2008, Raymond H. Davis of Rockville, Maryland, a second cousin of Arthur Pickens, published his biography titled Remembering Arthur Pickens.
