= Apollo (horse) =

American-bred Thoroughbred racehorse

- Sire: Ashstead or Lever
- Grandsire: Vedette or Lexington
- Dam: Rebecca T. Price
- Damsire: The Colonel
- Sex: Gelding
- Foaled: 1879
- Country: United States
- Colour: Chestnut
- Breeder: Daniel Swigert
- Owner: Green B. Morris & James D. Patton
- Trainer: Green B. Morris
- Record: 55: 24-15-9
- Earnings: $21,680

Major wins
- Montgomery Handicap (1882); St. Leger Handicap (1882) American Classics wins: Kentucky Derby (1882)

Apollo (1879–1887) was a champion American Thoroughbred racehorse who won the 1882 Kentucky Derby. He was the only horse to have won the Derby without racing at age two until Justify equalled the achievement in 2018. Apollo went on to race 21 times as a three-year-old, 30 times as a four-year-old, and 4 times as a five-year-old. He won a total of 24 races.

== Background ==
Apollo was bred by Daniel Swigert, who subsequently founded Elmendorf Farm. Apollo's dam was Rebecca T. Price, who had earlier produced stakes-winner Mahlstick. At the advanced age of 20, Rebecca T. Price was bred to two stallions, Ashstead and Lever. Her resulting foal of 1879 was a chestnut colt, subsequently gelded, with a white sock on his left hind leg. As DNA testing was not available at the time, his paternity was typically listed with both stallions named. The pedigree available on Equineline.com, run by The Jockey Club, shows Ashstead as the sire. However, Apollo was said to resemble Lever's sire, Lexington, more closely, leading to the common belief that Lever was Apollo's sire.

Originally trained for Swigert by Henry Brown, Apollo was injured as a two-year-old. He was then sold to trainer Green B. Morris and his partner James D. Patton for $1,200.

== Racing career ==
Unraced at age two, Apollo made his first three starts as a three-year-old in April 1882 in New Orleans. He finished second in his first start on April 11 in the Pickwick Stakes, run at a distance of 1 1/4 miles. He then finished second in a couple of one-mile heats a week later. On April 26, he broke his maiden in the Cottrill Stakes over a distance of 1 1/2 miles.

On May 16, Apollo entered the 1882 Kentucky Derby, then run at a distance of 1 1/2 miles, as part of a field of fourteen. The 4-5 favorite was Runnymede, a multiple stakes winner, while Apollo was grouped with two other horses as a field entry at 10–1. Apollo broke near the back of the pack but worked his way up to sixth after a mile. Runnymede was in third, positioned on the outside to avoid traffic. Turning into the stretch, Runnymede made his move and took the lead in deep stretch, looking the likely winner. However, Apollo closed with a "cyclonic rush" and caught up in the final strides, winning by half a length.

The two horses met up again just six days later in the Clark Stakes, with Runnymede winning "in a canter" while Apollo finished third. Runnymede and Belmont Stakes winner Forester were retroactively acknowledged as the co-champion three-year-olds of 1882. Apollo had a solid season himself, winning a total of ten races from 21 starts and only finishing out of the money once. In addition to the Derby and his maiden win in the Cottrill Stakes, he also won the Coal Stakes, Drummers Stakes, St. Leger Handicap, and Montgomery Handicap.

As a four-year-old in 1883, Apollo started 30 times, winning fourteen of them, including the Merchant's Stakes. He also finished second seven times and had six third-place finishes. In September alone, he won seven consecutive races.

== Retirement and death ==
Apollo was injured as a five-year-old and was retired from racing. He was given to a friend of Morris' wife that lived in Charleston for use as a saddle horse. He died in November 1887 of lockjaw.

== Pedigree ==
Pedigree of Apollo, chestnut gelding, 1879
Sire Ashstead (GB)	Vedette (GB)	Voltigeur (GB)	Voltaire (GB)
Sire Ashstead (GB)	Vedette (GB)	Voltigeur (GB)	Martha Lynn (GB)
Sire Ashstead (GB)	Vedette (GB)	Mrs. Ridgway (GB)	Birdcatcher (IRE)
Sire Ashstead (GB)	Vedette (GB)	Mrs. Ridgway (GB)	Nan Darrell (GB)
Sire Ashstead (GB)	Cowl Mare (GB)	Cowl (GB)	Bay Middleton (GB)
Sire Ashstead (GB)	Cowl Mare (GB)	Cowl (GB)	Crucifix (GB)
Sire Ashstead (GB)	Cowl Mare (GB)	Lanercost Mare (GB)	Lanercost (GB)
Sire Ashstead (GB)	Cowl Mare (GB)	Lanercost Mare (GB)	The Nun (GB)
Dam Rebecca T. Price	The Colonel	Priam (GB)	Emilius (GB)
Dam Rebecca T. Price	The Colonel	Priam (GB)	Cressida (GB)
Dam Rebecca T. Price	The Colonel	My Lady (GB)	Comus (GB)
Dam Rebecca T. Price	The Colonel	My Lady (GB)	Delpini Mare (GB)
Dam Rebecca T. Price	Margrave Mare	Margrave (GB)	Muley (GB)
Dam Rebecca T. Price	Margrave Mare	Margrave (GB)	Election Mare (GB)
Dam Rebecca T. Price	Margrave Mare	Rosalie Somers	Sir Charles
Dam Rebecca T. Price	Margrave Mare	Rosalie Somers	Mishief (family: A15)

The pedigree shown here assumes Apollo was sired by Ashstead rather than Lever.
