= Johren =

British-bred Thoroughbred racehorse

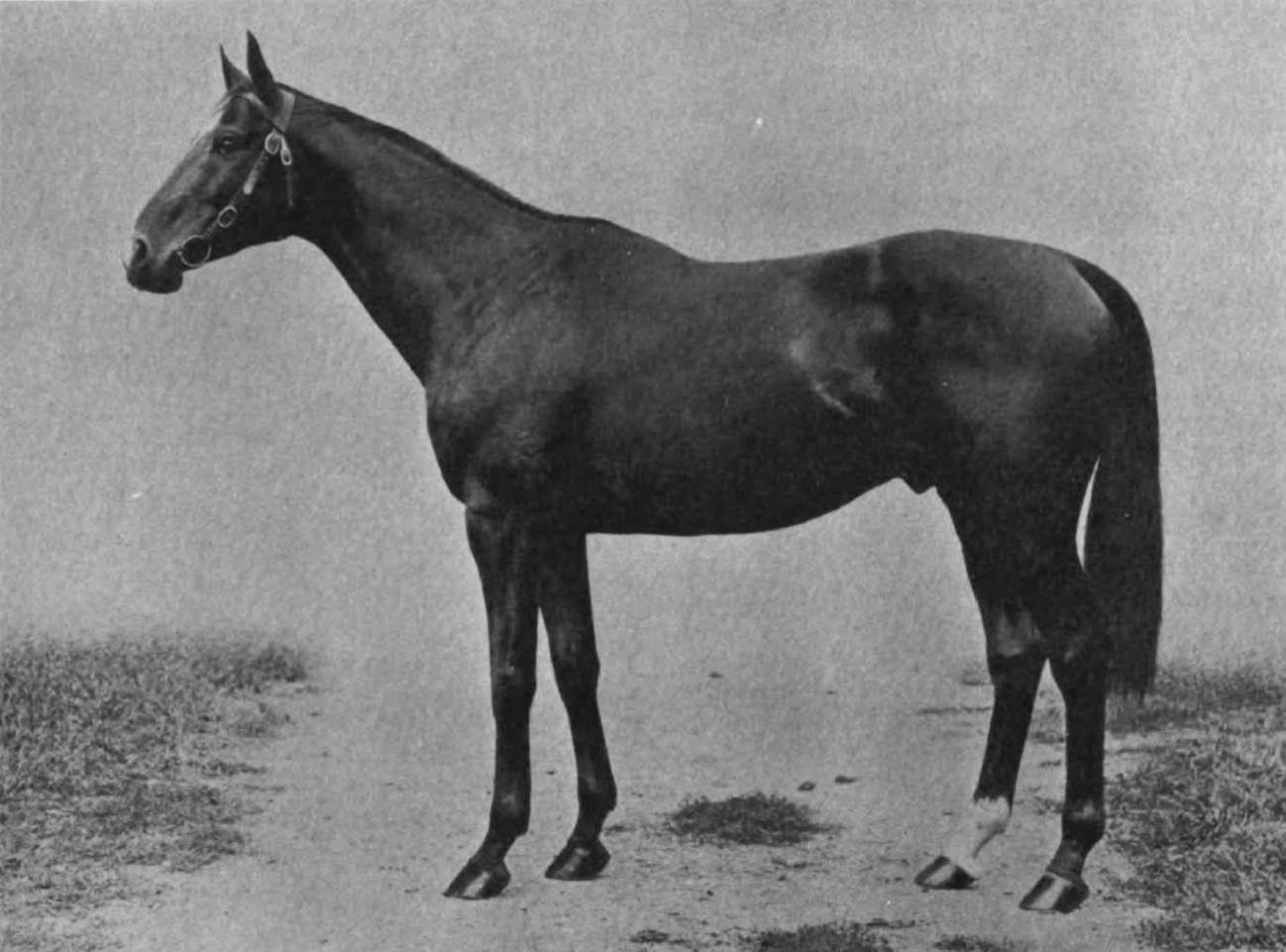
- Thoroughbred Types, 1900-1925 (1926)
- Sire: Spearmint
- Grandsire: Carbine
- Dam: Mineola
- Damsire: Meddler
- Sex: Stallion
- Foaled: 1915
- Country: Great Britain
- Colour: Bay
- Breeder: Harry Payne Whitney
- Owner: Harry Payne Whitney
- Trainer: James G. Rowe Sr. & Albert Simons
- Record: 22: 9-5-3
- Earnings: $49,156

Major wins
- Latonia Derby (1918); Suburban Handicap (1918); Saratoga Cup (1918); Lawrence Realization Stakes (1918); American Classics wins: Belmont Stakes (1918)
- Last updated on August 29, 2007

Johren (1915–1932) was a Thoroughbred racehorse who competed in the United States. His most important win came in the 1918 Belmont Stakes.

== Background ==
Johren was a "massive" bay horse owned and bred by Harry Payne Whitney. He was sired by Spearmint, the 1906 Grand Prix de Paris winner and a son of Australian Racing Hall of Fame and New Zealand Racing Hall of Fame inaugural inductee Carbine. As well as being the sire of the Belmont Stakes-winning filly Tanya, Johren's damsire Meddler was the damsire of U.S. Racing Hall of Fame inductee Grey Lag.

Harry Whitney had racing operations at Newmarket in England and in his native United States. He brought Johren as a yearling to his Brookdale Farm in Lincroft, New Jersey, where his race training was overseen by head trainer James G. Rowe Sr.

== Racing career ==
Johren was not sufficiently developed to race at age two and started his three-year-old racing season with nine straight losses before getting his first win. In the pre-U.S. Triple Crown era, he was not entered in the 1918 Kentucky Derby. Entered in the Preakness Stakes, Johren ran fourth and then won the Belmont Stakes, defeating the British-bred Preakness winner War Cloud. By the summer of 1918, the colt had become one of the dominant horses in American racing, winning a number of other important races including the 1918 Latonia Derby in late June, in which he beat Kentucky Derby winner Exterminator by three lengths. He was beaten by War Cloud in the Dwyer Stakes at Aqueduct in July.

== Stud career ==
Retired to stud duty, Johren had modest success as a sire. His most noteworthy progeny was Edisto, who raced for the Seagram Stables and won several races in Canada and the U.S. Johren died in 1932.
