= War Cloud =

British-bred Thoroughbred racehorse

- Sire: Polymelus
- Grandsire: Cyllene
- Dam: Dreamy
- Damsire: Persimmon
- Sex: Stallion
- Foaled: 1915
- Country: Great Britain
- Colour: Bay
- Breeder: Jack Barnato Joel
- Owner: A. Kingsley Macomber
- Trainer: Walter B. Jennings
- Record: 28: 11-4-3
- Earnings: $40,170

Major wins
- Walden Stakes (1917); Annapolis Stakes (1917); New Rochelle Handicap (1918); Dwyer Stakes (1918); Scarsdale Handicap (1918); Autumn Handicap (1919); Triple Crown Race wins: Preakness Stakes (1918)
- Last updated on November 13, 2006

War Cloud (1915–1923) was a British-bred Thoroughbred racehorse who was the first horse to compete in all three U.S.Triple Crown races.

== Background ==
Bred by Jack Barnato Joel, one of Britain's most prominent Thoroughbred owner/breeders, War Cloud was sold as a yearling and brought to race in the United States.

== Racing career ==
Successful racing at age two, War Cloud was the heavy favorite going into the 1918 Kentucky Derby after the U.S. Two-yr-Old Champion Colt Sun Briar was sidelined with ringbone disease. Ridden by Johnny Loftus, War Cloud finished fourth to longshot Exterminator.

The $17,500 Preakness Stakes attracted a very large field and was in two divisions. In the first division, War Cloud went off as the second favorite at post time at roughly 8/5, carrying 110 pounds (three more than any other runner), behind Lanius, who was the betting favorite at 7/5 and carried 107 pounds. Starting from post position five, War Cloud settled in third, stalking the leaders, George Starr and Flags, as they passed the stands for the first time. War Cloud then moved to the outside and passed the leaders going around the clubhouse turn, going in :48 flat for the first half mile. He widened his lead to two lengths down the backstretch, completing 3/4 mile in 1:13 flat. In the stretch, 53/1 longshot Sunny Slope challenged. War Cloud, ridden hard by jockey Johnny Loftus, held on to win by 3/4 of a length. After War Cloud and Sunny Slope, it was another ten lengths back to favorite Lanius in third, with Johren fourth. The second division was won by Jack Hare, Jr.

In the final leg of the Triple Crown races, the Belmont Stakes, War Cloud finished second to Harry Payne Whitney's colt, Johren. In the Dwyer Stakes at Aqueduct Race Track in July however, War Cloud showed "brilliant speed" to defeat Jack Hare, Jr. and Johren in front of a huge crowd. After racing successfully at age four, War Cloud was shipped to France to race in his five-year-old season but did not perform well.

== Retirement ==
He was brought back to stand at stud at Claiborne Farm in Paris, Kentucky, but broke a leg in 1923 and was euthanized. He is buried in Claiborne's equine cemetery.

== Pedigree ==
Pedigree of War Cloud (GB), bay stallion, 1915
Sire Polymelus (GB) 1902	Cyllene; 1895	Bona Vista	Bend Or
Sire Polymelus (GB) 1902	Cyllene; 1895	Bona Vista	Vista
Sire Polymelus (GB) 1902	Cyllene; 1895	Arcadia	Isonomy
Sire Polymelus (GB) 1902	Cyllene; 1895	Arcadia	Distant Shore
Sire Polymelus (GB) 1902	Maid Marian; 1886	Hampton	Lord Clifden
Sire Polymelus (GB) 1902	Maid Marian; 1886	Hampton	Lady Langden
Sire Polymelus (GB) 1902	Maid Marian; 1886	Quiver	Toxophilite
Sire Polymelus (GB) 1902	Maid Marian; 1886	Quiver	Young Melbourne mare
Dam Dreamy (GB) 1905	Persimmon; 1893	St Simon	Galopin
Dam Dreamy (GB) 1905	Persimmon; 1893	St Simon	St Angela
Dam Dreamy (GB) 1905	Persimmon; 1893	Perdita	Hampton
Dam Dreamy (GB) 1905	Persimmon; 1893	Perdita	Hermione
Dam Dreamy (GB) 1905	Rousseau's Dream; 1893	Saraband	Muncaster
Dam Dreamy (GB) 1905	Rousseau's Dream; 1893	Saraband	Highland Fling
Dam Dreamy (GB) 1905	Rousseau's Dream; 1893	Heloise	Hermit
Dam Dreamy (GB) 1905	Rousseau's Dream; 1893	Heloise	Devotion (Family 4-l)

- War Cloud was inbred 3 × 4 to Hampton, meaning that this stallion appears in both the third and fourth generation of his pedigree.
