= Stone Street (horse) =

American-bred Thoroughbred racehorse

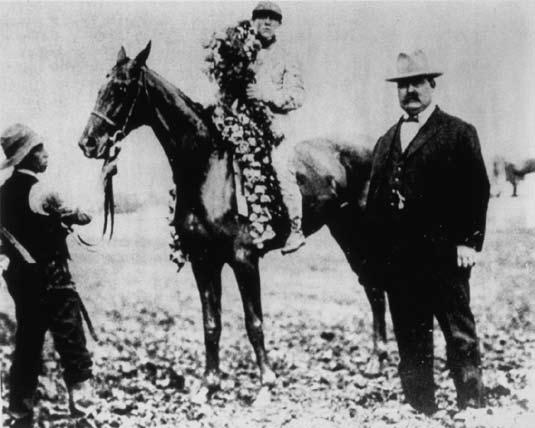
- 1908 Kentucky Derby winner Stone Street
- Sire: Longstreet
- Grandsire: Longfellow
- Dam: Stone Nellie
- Damsire: Stonehenge
- Sex: Stallion
- Foaled: 1905
- Country: United States
- Colour: Bay
- Breeder: James Ben Ali Haggin
- Owner: C. E. "Bud" & John W. Hamilton
- Trainer: John W. Hall
- Record: 92:18-17-9
- Earnings: $12,812

Major wins
- Triple Crown Race wins: Kentucky Derby (1908)

Stone Street (1905 – 1914) was an American Thoroughbred racehorse that is primarily remembered for winning the 1908 Kentucky Derby. He was a bay colt sired by Longstreet out of the mare Stone Nellie (by imported Stonehenge). His grandsire was the great racer and top nineteenth century sire Longfellow, himself a son of the important foundation sire Leamington. Stone Street was bred by noted horseman James Ben Ali Haggin, who had won the Derby in 1886 with his entry Ben Ali. Stone Street has also been called Stonestreet in other racing publications and is named after a combination of his sire and dam's names.

Stone Street Derby was trained by John W. Hall and ridden in the Derby by Arthur Pickens. The colt is notable because he had not won any major stakes races before the Derby and did not win another major stakes race in his entire six year racing career after the Derby.^{[1]} The 1908 Kentucky Derby was run on a wet track, with Stone Street easily creating an early lead over the other seven contenders, who were bogged down in the mud and were in poor racing form that day. The $5 minimum bet paid $123.60 to win for Stone Street at 24 to 1 final odds. ^{[1]} As of 2023, Stone Street's winning time of 2:15 1/5 is the slowest ever recorded at the Derby's current 1 1/4-mile distance. Stone Street was euthanized in January 1914 after becoming entangled in a wire fence. He had been gelded by the time of his death.

== Pedigree ==
Pedigree of Stone Street
| Sire Longstreet 1886 | Longfellow 1867 | Leamington | Faugh-a-Ballagh |
| Sire Longstreet 1886 | Longfellow 1867 | Leamington | Pantaloon Mare |
| Sire Longstreet 1886 | Longfellow 1867 | Nantura | Brawners Eclipse |
| Sire Longstreet 1886 | Longfellow 1867 | Nantura | Quiz |
| Sire Longstreet 1886 | Semper Idem 1881 | Glen Athol | Blair Athol |
| Sire Longstreet 1886 | Semper Idem 1881 | Glen Athol | Greta |
| Sire Longstreet 1886 | Semper Idem 1881 | Semper Vive | Waverly |
| Sire Longstreet 1886 | Semper Idem 1881 | Semper Vive | Semper Felix |
| Dam Stone Nellie 1891 | Stonehenge 1870 | Blair Athol | Stockwell |
| Dam Stone Nellie 1891 | Stonehenge 1870 | Blair Athol | Blink Bonny |
| Dam Stone Nellie 1891 | Stonehenge 1870 | Coimbra | Kingston |
| Dam Stone Nellie 1891 | Stonehenge 1870 | Coimbra | Calcavella |
| Dam Stone Nellie 1891 | Nell 1885 | King Ernest | King Tom |
| Dam Stone Nellie 1891 | Nell 1885 | King Ernest | Ernestine |
| Dam Stone Nellie 1891 | Nell 1885 | Miss Nellie | Eclipse |
| Dam Stone Nellie 1891 | Nell 1885 | Miss Nellie | Laura Farris |
