= William H. Fizer =

American horse trainer

William Fizer
Personal information
- Born: December 23, 1867 Kentucky
- Died: January 14, 1948 (aged 80) New York
- Resting place: Old Gray Cemetery; Knoxville, Tennessee

Horse racing career
- Sport: Horse racing

Major racing wins
- Decoration Handicap (1908); Empire City Handicap (1908); Latonia Derby (1908); Midsummer Stakes (1908); Kentucky Oaks (1909); Latonia Independence Handicap (1910) American Classics wins: Kentucky Derby (1907)

Significant horses
- Floreal, Pink Star, Pinkola

William Henry Fizer (1861 – February 15, 1937) was a trainer of Thoroughbred racehorses who won the 1907 Kentucky Derby with Pink Star, the 1908 Latonia Derby with Pinkola, and the 1909 Kentucky Oaks with Floreal.

Born in Kentucky, as a young man William Fizer made his home in Knoxville, Tennessee. He was in New York when he died on February 15, 1937. His remains were shipped to Knoxville for interment.
