= Typhoon II =

American Thoroughbred racehorse

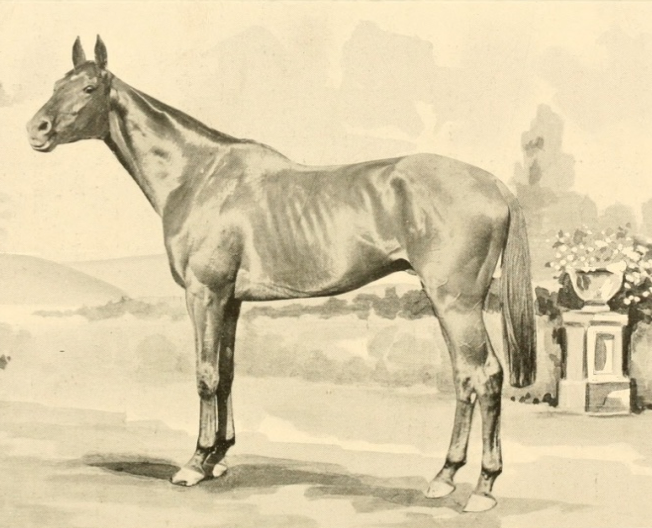
- Sire: Top Gallant
- Grandsire: Sterling
- Dam: Dolly Varden
- Damsire: Glenelg
- Sex: Stallion, eventually Gelding
- Foaled: 1894
- Country: United States
- Colour: Chestnut
- Breeder: John B. Ewing
- Owner: 1) J. C. Cahn; 2) Bromley & Co.
- Trainer: J. C. Cahn
- Record: 39: 19-9-3
- Earnings: $22,325

Major wins
- Westchester Highweight Handicap (1896); Golden Rod Stakes (1896); Brewers' Stakes (1896); St. Louis Club Members Handicap (1897); Memorial Handicap (1897); Peabody Hotel Handicap (1897); Luehrmann Hotel Stakes (1897); Chickasaw Club Handicap (1897); Highweight Handicap (1898) Triple Crown Race wins: Kentucky Derby (1897)

Typhoon II (foaled April 17, 1894) was an American thoroughbred racehorse that was bred in Tennessee and was the winner of the 1897 Kentucky Derby.

Typhoon won the Derby at 11-5 odds against the favored Ornament on a very muddy track. After his Derby win Typhoon II was sold on August 1, 1897, for $12,000 to Bromley & Co., owned by Joseph E. Bromley & Arthur Featherstone. He followed his Derby win by winning the Club Members' Handicap in St. Louis, Missouri but lost many races after his three-year-old season. The stallion's career declined in his fourth season, when he lost a race at Sheepshead Bay Race Track against only one other competitor.

Typhoon II was gelded in 1899 and was thereafter stabled at the Kenmore Farm in Lexington, a farm owned by Bromley & Co., to live the remainder of his life as a pensioner. By 1903, Featherstone ordered his trainer, Julius Bauer, to dispose of Typhoon II, as the horse's paddock was needed for another purpose. Bauer gave the horse to a friend in Lexington, who put him to work as a cart horse hauling hay for livestock.

== Pedigree ==
Pedigree of Typhoon II
Sire Top Gallant 1884	Sterling 1868	Oxford	Birdcatcher
Sire Top Gallant 1884	Sterling 1868	Oxford	Honey Dear
Sire Top Gallant 1884	Sterling 1868	Whisper	Flatcatcher
Sire Top Gallant 1884	Sterling 1868	Whisper	Silence
Sire Top Gallant 1884	Sea Mark 1873	Adventurer	Newminster
Sire Top Gallant 1884	Sea Mark 1873	Adventurer	Palma
Sire Top Gallant 1884	Sea Mark 1873	Sea Gull	Lifeboat
Sire Top Gallant 1884	Sea Mark 1873	Sea Gull	Wild Cherry
Dam Dolly Varden 1877	Glenelg 1866	Citadel	Stockwell
Dam Dolly Varden 1877	Glenelg 1866	Citadel	Sortie
Dam Dolly Varden 1877	Glenelg 1866	Babta	Kingston
Dam Dolly Varden 1877	Glenelg 1866	Babta	Alice Lowe
Dam Dolly Varden 1877	Nannie Black 1873	Virgil	Vandal
Dam Dolly Varden 1877	Nannie Black 1873	Virgil	Hymenia
Dam Dolly Varden 1877	Nannie Black 1873	Nannie Butler	Lexington
Dam Dolly Varden 1877	Nannie Black 1873	Nannie Butler	Tokay
