= Elwood (horse) =

American-bred Thoroughbred racehorse

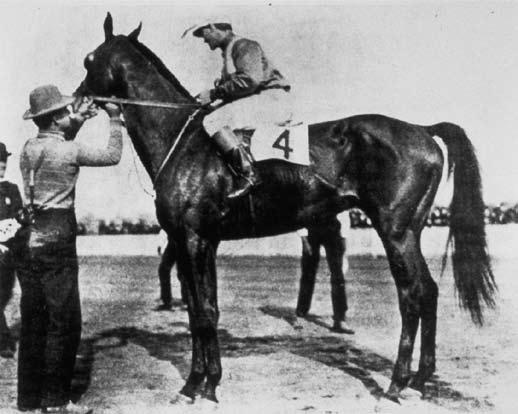
- 1904 Kentucky Derby winner Elwood
- Sire: Free Knight
- Grandsire: Ten Broeck
- Dam: Petticoat
- Damsire: Alarm
- Sex: Stallion, eventually Gelding
- Foaled: 1901
- Country: United States
- Colour: Bay
- Breeder: Emma Holt Prather
- Owner: 1) Lasca Durnell; 2) Burlingame Stables
- Trainer: Charles Elwood Durnell
- Record: 58: 8-7-5
- Earnings: $15,590

Major wins
- Latonia Derby (1904); American Classic Race wins: Kentucky Derby (1904)

Elwood (foaled 1901 in Missouri) was an American Thoroughbred racehorse that is best remembered for winning the 1904 Kentucky Derby and for being the first horse both bred and owned by a woman to win the Derby.

== Pedigree ==
Elwood was a bay colt sired by Free Knight out of the mare Petticoat (by Alarm). Free Knight finished third in the 1886 Kentucky Derby. By the time Elwood won the Derby in 1904, Free Knight had been sold for $45 and was used as a farm horse in southern Kentucky.

Elwood was bred by Emma Holt Prather at Faustiana Stud in Maryville, Missouri and was bought in 1902 by Charles Durnell while on a horse buying trip to San Francisco, where the yearling was being trained. Durnell named the horse Elwood after his mother's maiden name.

== Racing career ==
Elwood was a mediocre racehorse during his two-year-old and early three-year-old season, racing mostly in small stakes and a few $300 claiming races in California. He was second in the Competition Stakes and Youngster Stakes as a two-year-old and in the 1904 California Ascot Derby, which was run on a very muddy track that year.^{[2]}

Elwood was raced in Charles Durnell's wife's name. Lasca Durnell entered the colt in the Kentucky Derby without her husband's knowledge. For the Derby, the Durnells traveled with Elwood by railroad car from California to Kentucky, but Derby spectators did not think the "Missouri mule" would win.^{[2]} The thirtieth Kentucky Derby was run on a fast track with a field of five contenders.^{[1]} Elwood won at 15-1 odds over the favored colt, Proceeds, to win $4,850 in one of the greatest upsets recorded at the Derby to that date.^{[1]}

Elwood went on to win the 1904 Latonia Derby but was 15th of 16 in the more prestigious 1904 American Derby.

Elwood was gelded at some point during his four-year-old season but did race, with marginal success, until he was six years old in California. In 1907, Charles Durnell was banned from racing horses and had to sell 20 horses, including Elwood, from his Burlingame Stables. By 1910, Elwood was being used as a saddle horse in California.

== Pedigree ==
Pedigree of Elwood
Sire Free Knight 1883	Ten Broeck 1872	Phaeton	King Tom
Sire Free Knight 1883	Ten Broeck 1872	Phaeton	Merry Sunshine
Sire Free Knight 1883	Ten Broeck 1872	Fanny Holton	Lexington*
Sire Free Knight 1883	Ten Broeck 1872	Fanny Holton	Nantura
Sire Free Knight 1883	Bell Knight 1866	Knighthood	Knight of St George
Sire Free Knight 1883	Bell Knight 1866	Knighthood	Glycera
Sire Free Knight 1883	Bell Knight 1866	Kentucky Belle	Goodwood*
Sire Free Knight 1883	Bell Knight 1866	Kentucky Belle	Nora
Dam Petticoat 1883	Alarm 1869	Eclipse	Orlando
Dam Petticoat 1883	Alarm 1869	Eclipse	Gaze
Dam Petticoat 1883	Alarm 1869	Maud	Stockwell
Dam Petticoat 1883	Alarm 1869	Maud	Countess of Albemarle
Dam Petticoat 1883	Lady Scarborough 1876	Leamington	Faugh-a-Ballagh
Dam Petticoat 1883	Lady Scarborough 1876	Leamington	Pantaloon Mare
Dam Petticoat 1883	Lady Scarborough 1876	Lady Lumley	Rataplan
Dam Petticoat 1883	Lady Scarborough 1876	Lady Lumley	Schottische

* Elwood is inbred 4S x 5S to the stallion Lexington, meaning that he appears fourth generation and fifth generation (via Goodwood) on the sire side of his pedigree.
