= Lieut. Gibson =

American-bred Thoroughbred racehorse

- Sire: G W Johnson
- Grandsire: Iroquois
- Dam: Sophia Hardy
- Damsire: Glengarry
- Sex: Stallion
- Foaled: 1897
- Country: United States
- Color: Bay
- Breeder: Col. Robert L. Baker & Gentry
- Owner: Charles Head Smith
- Trainer: Charles H. Hughes
- Record: 24: 10 - 5 - 3
- Earnings: $21,490

Major wins
- Flatbush Stakes (1899); Latonia Derby (1900); Clark Handicap (1900); American Classic Race wins: Kentucky Derby (1900)

Lieutenant Gibson (1897–1900) was an American thoroughbred racehorse that was bred in Kentucky and is best remembered for winning the 1900 Kentucky Derby. His winning time of 2:06 1/4 stood as the Derby record for 11 years. Lieut. Gibson also won the Latonia Derby, Clark Stakes and Flatbush Stakes as a three-year-old. He was the crowd favorite for the 1900 running of the American Derby, but ran third.

Shortly after his failure at the American Derby, Lieut. Gibson sustained a bowed tendon and was retired from racing. The condition progressively worsened until surgery was attempted to repair the tendon and reduce the swelling in his leg. However, the colt died during the operation on December 18, 1900, at the Washington Park Race Track, formerly in Chicago, Illinois. The horse was secretly buried with little fanfare, with his death being leaked to the press more than a week after his death. When the New York Times interviewed Lieut. Gibson's owner for comment, Charles Head Smith said the following.

It was not my intention to say anything about Gibson's death, but it is true that he died a week ago Tuesday and was buried without any publicity. I had great confidence in Gibson. His sufferings were far more a matter of regret to me than could have been any pecuniary loss I experienced by the disabling of the colt. He was a brave horse, a well-bred one, and when he died I wanted him buried with just as little publicity as possible.

== Pedigree ==
Pedigree of Lieut. Gibson
Sire G W Johnson 1890	Iroquois 1878	Leamington	Faugh-a-Ballagh
Sire G W Johnson 1890	Iroquois 1878	Leamington	Pantaloon Mare
Sire G W Johnson 1890	Iroquois 1878	Maggie B B	Australian
Sire G W Johnson 1890	Iroquois 1878	Maggie B B	Madeline
Sire G W Johnson 1890	Brunette 1877	Bonnie Scotland	Iago
Sire G W Johnson 1890	Brunette 1877	Bonnie Scotland	Queen Mary
Sire G W Johnson 1890	Brunette 1877	Variella	Vandal
Sire G W Johnson 1890	Brunette 1877	Variella	Nubia
Dam Sophia Hardy 1889	Glengarry 1866	Thormanby	Windhound
Dam Sophia Hardy 1889	Glengarry 1866	Thormanby	Alice Hawthorn
Dam Sophia Hardy 1889	Glengarry 1866	Carbine	Rifleman
Dam Sophia Hardy 1889	Glengarry 1866	Carbine	Troica
Dam Sophia Hardy 1889	Unaka 1884	Enquirer	Leamington
Dam Sophia Hardy 1889	Unaka 1884	Enquirer	Lida
Dam Sophia Hardy 1889	Unaka 1884	Wampee	John Morgan
Dam Sophia Hardy 1889	Unaka 1884	Wampee	Dora
