= Bonnie Scotland (horse) =

British racehorse

- Sire: Iago (GB)
- Grandsire: Don John (GB)
- Dam: Queen Mary (GB)
- Damsire: Gladiator (GB)
- Sex: Stallion
- Foaled: 1853
- Died: February 1, 1880; Belle Meade Stud, Nashville, Tennessee
- Country: Great Britain
- Color: Bay
- Breeder: William l'Anson
- Record: 4: 2-1-0

Major wins
- Liverpool St Leger (1856); Doncaster Stakes (1856)

Awards
- Leading sire in North America (1880, 1882)

Bonnie Scotland (foaled 1853) was a British Thoroughbred racehorse, who finished second in the St Leger Stakes and won the Doncaster Stakes, after which he broke down. After one season at stud in England, he was exported to America where he stood in Ohio. Relatively late in his career, Bonnie Scotland was relocated to Tennessee and became the leading sire in North America, with notable offspring including Hall of Famer Luke Blackburn and Belmont Stakes winner George Kinney. Through his grandson Ben Brush, Bonnie Scotland's sire line produced multiple American Classic winners in the early 20th century.

== Background ==
Bonnie Scotland was a bay horse who was sired by Iago out of Queen Mary by Gladiator. Although Iago was a relatively obscure sire, Queen Mary came to be one of the most influential mares of her time, founding thoroughbred family 10-a. On the racetrack, Queen Mary's best foal was Blink Bonny, who won the Derby and Oaks in 1857. Four of Queen Mary's foals became major producers themselves, with Braxey and Blooming Heather founding families 10-d and 10-e respectively.

Bonnie Scotland stood 16 hands (64 inches, 163 cm) high and was said to be an attractive horse with good conformation. According to horseman Henry Herbert, "he has the longest shoulder, deepest heart-place, best forehand, shortest saddle-place, and the most powerful quarters of any horse now before the public."

== Racing career ==
Bonnie Scotland made only four career starts, recording two wins and one second-place finish. His first win came in the Liverpool St Leger, followed by a second-place finish in the St Leger Stakes at Doncaster. His last start was in the Doncaster Stakes at a distance of 12 furlongs. He won the race but then broke down, prompting his retirement.

== Stud career ==
Bonnie Scotland stood his first year at stud in England but got little support – he sired only two foals in his first crop. He was sold to Eugene Leigh and was imported to the United States in 1857. He stood at Fashion Stud in Ohio from 1858 to 1867, then moved to Kentucky, then Illinois. In 1873 at the advanced age of 20, he was purchased by William G. Harding of Belle Meade Stud in Tennessee, one of the major breeding operations of the time. Bonnie Scotland remained at Belle Meade for the rest of his life, dying on February 1, 1880.

Bonnie Scotland was the leading sire in North America of 1880 and 1882, and finished second in both 1868 and 1871. He is credited with 21 stakes winners, including Belmont Stakes winner George Kinney and Hall of Fame inductee Luke Blackburn. Another son, Bramble, had a solid racing career but is most famous as the sire of champion and leading sire Ben Brush. Ben Brush, himself a winner of the Kentucky Derby, established a sire line that produced Classic winners such as Regret, Sweep and Whiskery. Bonnie Scotland was also a successful broodmare sire, most notably through his daughter Bourbon Belle who produced champion and leading sire Hanover.

== Sire line tree ==
- Bonnie Scotland
  - Dangerous
  - Malcolm
  - Regent
  - Frogtown
  - Lochiel
  - Bombast
  - Bramble
    - Clifford
      - Caughnawaga
      - Blackford
      - Cliff Edge
      - Sea Cliff
    - Ben Brush
      - Broomstick
        - Whisk Broom
        - Meridian
        - Sweeper
        - Holiday
        - Thunderer
        - Cudgel
        - Tippity Witchet
        - Dr Clark
        - Wildair
        - Broomspun
        - Runantell
        - Moonraker
        - Spot Cash
        - Transmute
        - Blondin
        - Bostonian
        - Cantankerous
        - Brooms
        - Halcyon
      - Delhi
        - Outram
        - Dominant
      - Von Tromp
      - Theo Cook
      - Sweep
        - The Porter
        - Eternal
        - Bon Homme
        - Leonardo
        - General Thatcher
        - Mantagna
      - Vandergrift
      - Pebbles
    - Prince Of Melbourne
  - Bulwark
  - Luke Blackburn
    - Proctor Knott
    - Uncle Bob
  - Barrett
  - Springfield
  - Boatman
  - George Kinney

== Pedigree ==
Pedigree of Bonnie Scotland (GB), bay horse, foaled 1853
Sire Iago	Don John	Waverley	Whalebone*
Sire Iago	Don John	Waverley	Margaretta
Sire Iago	Don John	Comus Mare	Comus
Sire Iago	Don John	Comus Mare	Marciana
Sire Iago	Scandal	Selim*	Buzzard
Sire Iago	Scandal	Selim*	Alexander Mare
Sire Iago	Scandal	Haphazard Mare	Haphazard
Sire Iago	Scandal	Haphazard Mare	Princess
Dam Queen Mary	Gladiator	Partisan	Walton
Dam Queen Mary	Gladiator	Partisan	Parasol
Dam Queen Mary	Gladiator	Pauline	Moses
Dam Queen Mary	Gladiator	Pauline	Quadrille*
Dam Queen Mary	Plenipotentiary Mare	Plenipotentiary	Emilius
Dam Queen Mary	Plenipotentiary Mare	Plenipotentiary	Harriet
Dam Queen Mary	Plenipotentiary Mare	Myrrha	Whalebone*
Dam Queen Mary	Plenipotentiary Mare	Myrrha	Gift (family 10-a)

* Bonnie Scotland is inbred 3S x 5D to the stallion Selim, meaning that he appears third generation on the sire side of his pedigree, and fifth generation (via Quadrille) on the dam side of his pedigree.

* Bonnie Scotland is inbred 4S x 4D to the stallion Whalebone, meaning that he appears fourth generation on the sire side of his pedigree, and fourth generation on the dam side of his pedigree.
