= Empire City Derby =

- Class: Discontinued stakes
- Location: Empire City Race Track, Yonkers, New York; United States
- Inaugurated: 1917
- Race type: Thoroughbred – Flat racing

Race information
- Distance: 1¼ miles (10 furlongs)
- Surface: Dirt
- Track: left-handed
- Qualification: Three Years Old

The Empire City Derby was an American Thoroughbred horse race held annually from 1917 through 1933 at Empire City Race Track in Yonkers, New York. A race for three-year-old horses of either sex, the event was contested at a mile and one-eighth at inception until 1920 when it was set at what became known as the "Derby distance" of a mile and one-quarter. With the Brooklyn Derby at Belmont Park having changed its name to the Dwyer Stakes, the Empire City Derby was then the only Derby event in the Northeastern United States.

== Historical notes ==
First run on July 21, 1917, the race was won by Rickety, a colt trained by future Hall of Fame inductee James G. Rowe Sr. Rickety was owned by Harry Payne Whitney, a leading horseman at the time and member of the prominent Whitney family who in 2018 was honored by the National Museum of Racing and Hall of Fame as one of the Pillars of the Turf. Whitney had won the 1915 Kentucky Derby with his Hall of Fame filly Regret and in addition to his 1917 Empire City Derby victory, Whitney would win the race again in 1920 and 1926.

The 1918 edition of the Empire City Derby was won by Jack Hare Jr. who earlier had won the second division of the Preakness Stakes in the only year in the history of that future U.S. Triple Crown race that it was run in two divisions.

Purchase, owned and trained by another future Hall of Fame inductee Sam Hildreth won the 1919 running. The beautiful chestnut son of Ormondale and the good racemare Cherryola was reported by noted racing historian Walter Vosburgh as a horse referred to as the "Adonis of the Turf".

In 1920, Harry Payne Whitney's Wildair had come into the race having easily won the prestigious Metropolitan Handicap at one mile. However, in the mile and an eighth Preakness Stakes he ran third and the "Derby distance" might be too far for the colt. However, Wildair won the mile and a quarter Empire City Derby by a length and a half for owner Harry Payne Whitney and his trainer James G. Rowe Sr. Wildair would go on to become a sire and the damsire of several notable horses including Pot O'Luck and U.S. Racing Hall of Fame inductees Alsab and Bewitch.

Sam Hildreth won his second Empire City Derby in 1921 as the trainer of the Rancocas Stable star runner Grey Lag who would earn retrospective American Horse of the Year honors for 1921 and in 1957 be inducted into the U. S. Racing Hall of Fame.

James Butler, owner of Empire City Race Track, won the 1930 Derby with the colt Questionnaire. This was the first of his two Derby wins.

== Demise ==
Thoroughbred racing had been dealt a severe blow with the 1908 passage of the Hart–Agnew anti-betting legislation by the New York Legislature which led to a state-wide shutdown of racing in 1911 and 1912. Owners, whose horses of racing age had nowhere to go, began sending them, their trainers and their jockeys to race in England and France. Many horses ended their racing careers there and a number remained to become an important part of the European horse breeding industry. Thoroughbred Times reported that more than 1,500 American horses were sent overseas between 1908 and 1913 and of them at least 24 were either past, present, or future Champions. A February 21, 1913 ruling by the New York Supreme Court, Appellate Division saw horse racing return in 1913.

The 1917 creation of the Empire City Derby symbolized the industry's recovery was gaining momentum but the Great Depression of the 1930s reversed much of the gains as breeding and other necessary monetary cutbacks resulted in fewer horses available to compete. As such, in 1932 the purse money for the Empire City Derby was cut by 40 percent and the following year it was cut further by nearly 50 percent. What would turn out to be the race's final running took place on July 15, 1933 and was won by Balios, a colt owned by the Phipps family's Wheatley Stable.

== Records ==
Speed record:

- 2:06.20 @ 1¼ miles: Ordinance (1924)

Most wins by a jockey:

- 3 – Laverne Fator (1921, 1925, 1927)

Most wins by a trainer:

- 3 – James G. Rowe Sr. (1917, 1920, 1926)
- 3 – Sam Hildreth (1919, 1921, 1925)
- 3 – James E. Fitzsimmons (1923, 1931, 1933)

Most wins by an owner:

- 3 – Harry Payne Whitney (1917, 1920, 1926)

== Winners ==
Year	Winner	Age	Jockey	Trainer	Owner	Dist. (Miles)	Time	Win$
1933	Balios	3	Charles Landolt	James E. Fitzsimmons	Wheatley Stable	1 1/4	2:09.40	$1,980
1932	Apprentice	3	Earl Sande	Edward J. Bennett	James Butler	1 1/4	2:05.40	$3,950
1931	Sir Ashley	3	Thomas Malley	James E. Fitzsimmons	Belair Stud Stable	1 1/4	2:07.20	$6,550
1930	Questionnaire	3	Mack Garner	Andy Schuttinger	James Butler	1 1/4	2:05.80	$6,550
1929	Healy	3	Willie Kelsay	Henry McDaniel	Gifford A. Cochran	1 1/4	2:05.80	$6,400
1928	Genie	3	Willie Kelsay	Henry McDaniel	Gifford A. Cochran	1 1/4	2:10.00	$7,550
1927	Bois de Rose	3	Laverne Fator	William J. Speirs	William Ziegler Jr.	1 1/4	2:08.00	$7,000
1926	Blondin	3	Linus McAtee	James G. Rowe Sr.	Harry Payne Whitney	1 1/4	2:06.20	$7,050
1925	Silver Fox	3	Laverne Fator	Sam Hildreth	Rancocas Stable	1 1/4	2:06.80	$6,750
1924	Ordinance	3	John Maiben	Louis Feustel	August Belmont Jr.	1 1/4	2:06.20	$7,650
1923	Pettifogger	3	Edgar Barnes	James E. Fitzsimmons	Quincy Stable (James Francis Johnson)	1 1/4	2:05.60	$7,600
1922	Hephaistos	3	Earl Sande	Frank E. Brown	Frank E. Brown	1 1/4	2:07.00	$6,550
1921	Grey Lag	3	Laverne Fator	Sam Hildreth	Rancocas Stable	1 1/4	2:07.20	$4,450
1920	Wildair	3	Eddie Ambrose	James G. Rowe Sr.	Harry Payne Whitney	1 1/8	1:53.20	$4,650
1919	Purchase	3	Willie Knapp	Sam Hildreth	Sam Hildreth	1 1/8	1:56.40	$3,850
1918	Jack Hare Jr.	3	George Molesworth	Frank D. Weir	William E. Applegate	1 1/8	1:53.40	$3,850
1917	Rickety	3	Frank Robinson	James G. Rowe Sr.	Harry Payne Whitney	1 1/8	1:52.20	$3,850
