= 1927 Kentucky Derby =

Horse race

53rd Kentucky Derby
- Kentucky Derby
- Location: Churchill Downs
- Date: May 14, 1927
- Winning horse: Whiskery
- Jockey: Linus McAtee
- Trainer: Fred Hopkins
- Owner: Harry Payne Whitney
- Conditions: Slow
- Surface: Dirt

The 1927 Kentucky Derby was the 53rd running of the Kentucky Derby. The race was run on May 14, 1927. Whiskery was the winner after defeating Osmand by a nose in the stretch.

== Payout ==
The Kentucky Derby Payout Schedule

Program Number	Horse Name	Win	Place	Show
9	Whiskery	$6.80	$3.80	$3.40
12	Osmand	–	$6.40	$5.80
1	Jock	–	–	$14.20

== Field ==
Position	Post	Horse	Jockey	Trainer	Owner	Final Odds	Stake
1	7	Whiskery	Linus McAtee	Fred Hopkins	Harry Payne Whitney	2.40	$51,000
2	10	Osmand	Earl Sande	Pete Coyne	Joseph E. Widener	6.90	$6,000
3	1	Jock	Chick Lang	John F. Schorr	Edward Beale McLean	37.80	$3,000
4	5	Hydromel	Willie Garner	Daniel E. Stewart	Johnson N. Camden, Jr.	16.00	$1,000
5	12	Bostonian	Whitey Abel	Fred Hopkins	Harry Payne Whitney	2.40	
6	4	Buddy Bauer	Goldie Johnson	Herbert J. Thompson	Edward R. Bradley	15.40	
7	2	Royal Julian	Walter Lilley	Lon Johnson	W. H. Whitehouse	14.70	
8	13	Fred Jr.	Nicholas Burger	Frank A. Stevens	S. W. Grant	18.30	
9	15	Scapa Flow	Frank Coltiletti	Scott P. Harlan	Walter M. Jeffords Sr.	7.00	
10	6	Black Panther	Louis Schaefer	Thomas J. Healey	Walter J. Salmon Sr.	14.70	
11	8	Kiev	Mack Garner	Pete Coyne	Joseph E. Widener	6.90	
12	3	Rolled Stocking	William Pool	Charles C. Van Meter	James W. Parrish	4.70	
13	11	Rip Rap	Steve O'Donnell	Max Hirsch	Sage Stable	11.60	
14	9	Bewithus	Albert Johnson	Herbert J. Thompson	Edward R. Bradley	15.40	
15	14	War Eagle	Eddie Ambrose	John F. Schorr	Edward Beale McLean	37.80	

- Winning Breeder: Harry Payne Whitney; (KY)
- Margins – Head
- Time – 2:06
- Track – Slow
- Horses Saxon, My Son, and Mr. Kirkwood were scratched before the race.
