= Wildair =

American-bred Thoroughbred racehorse

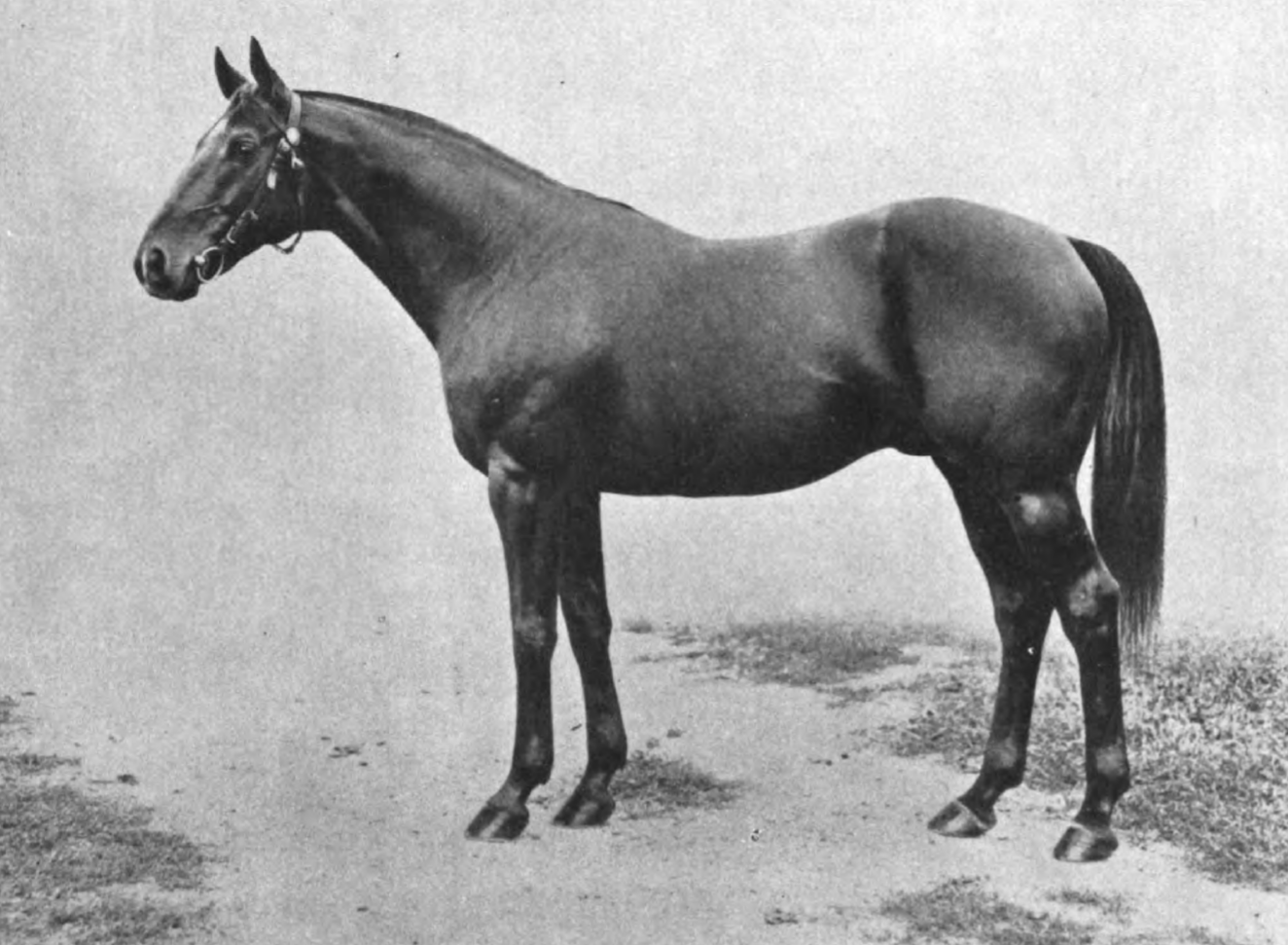
- Wildair
- Sire: Broomstick
- Grandsire: Ben Brush
- Dam: Verdure
- Damsire: Peter Pan
- Sex: Stallion
- Foaled: 1917
- Country: United States
- Colour: Bay
- Breeder: Harry Payne Whitney
- Owner: Harry Payne Whitney
- Trainer: James Rowe Sr.
- Record: 31: 9-10-5
- Earnings: US$$32,136

Major wins
- Metropolitan Handicap (1920); Marathon Handicap (1920); Empire City Derby (1920); Ten Broeck Handicap (1920); Chesapeake Handicap (1920); Delaware Handicap (1921)

Wildair (foaled 1917 in Kentucky) was an American Thoroughbred racehorse bred and raced by Exemplar of Racing Harry Payne Whitney and trained by U.S. Racing Hall of Fame inductee, James Rowe Sr. Wildair's most important race win came in the 1920 Metropolitan Handicap, one of the most prestigious American races outside of the Triple Crown series.

== Breeding ==
Regally bred, Wildair was sired by Hall of Fame inductee Broomstick who was the son of another Hall of Fame inductee, Ben Brush. Wildair's dam was Verdure by yet another Hall of Fame inductee Peter Pan.

== Racing career ==
In his three-year-old season, after running third to the legendary Man o' War in the Preakness Stakes, Wildair won the 1920 Empire City Derby. Among his other notable wins in 1920, Wildair won the Chesapeake Handicap at Pimlico Race Course and defeated the 1919 U.S. Triple Crown champion Sir Barton to win the Marathon Handicap at Havre de Grace Racetrack. Racing at age four, Wildair won the Delaware Handicap.

== Progeny ==
Wildair was modestly successful as a sire. His best was the colt Sir Harry who won the 1927 Coffroth Handicap, the then richest race in North America with a purse of $100,000. That same year Sir Harry ran second to Bostonian in the 1927 Preakness Stakes. Wildair was also the damsire of several very good horses including Pot O'Luck and U.S. Racing Hall of Fame inductees Alsab and Bewitch.

== Sire line tree ==
- Wildair
  - Canter
    - Swashbuckler
      - Third Army
  - Sir Harry

== Pedigree ==
Pedigree of Wildair, bay stallion, 1917
Sire Broomstick	Ben Brush	Bramble	Bonnie Scotland
Sire Broomstick	Ben Brush	Bramble	Ivy Leaf
Sire Broomstick	Ben Brush	Roseville	Reform
Sire Broomstick	Ben Brush	Roseville	Albia
Sire Broomstick	Elf	Galliard	Galopin
Sire Broomstick	Elf	Galliard	Mavis
Sire Broomstick	Elf	Sylvabelle	Bend Or
Sire Broomstick	Elf	Sylvabelle	Saint Editha
Dam Verdure	Peter Pan	Commando	Domino
Dam Verdure	Peter Pan	Commando	Emma C
Dam Verdure	Peter Pan	Cinderella	Hermit
Dam Verdure	Peter Pan	Cinderella	Mazurka
Dam Verdure	Pastorella	Springfield	St Albans
Dam Verdure	Pastorella	Springfield	Viridis
Dam Verdure	Pastorella	Griselda	Strathconan
Dam Verdure	Pastorella	Griselda	Perseverance (family: 19-b)
