= Sir Harry (Canadian horse) =

American-bred Thoroughbred racehorse

- Sire: Wildair
- Grandsire: Broomstick
- Dam: Ballotade
- Damsire: Ballot
- Sex: Stallion
- Foaled: 1924
- Country: Kentucky
- Colour: Chestnut
- Breeder: Charles H. Berryman
- Owner: Seagram Stables
- Trainer: William H. Bringloe
- Record: 87: 14-19-13
- Earnings: US$134,067

Major wins
- Dorval Juvenile Stakes (1926); Blue Bonnets Kindergarten Stakes (1926); Coffroth Handicap (1927); Jockey Club Cup Handicap (1928); Seagram Cup Handicap (1928); King Edward Gold Cup Handicap (1929)

Sir Harry (1924–1930) was an American Thoroughbred racehorse owned by the Seagram family stables who won the 1927 Coffroth Handicap, the then richest race in North America with a purse of $100,000. Race conditioned by future Hall of Fame trainer William Bringloe and ridden by the highly regarded young jockey Ovila Bourassa, that same year Sir Harry ran second in the 1927 Preakness Stakes, the second leg of the U.S. Triple Crown series .

== Breeding ==
Sir Harry was bred by Charles H. Berryman, President of the Tri-State Fair and Racing Association of Lexington, Kentucky. He was sired by Wildair, a son of three-time Leading sire in North America, Broomstick. Wildair was bred and raced by Harry Payne Whitney and trained by U.S. Racing Hall of Fame inductee, James G. Rowe Sr., Wildair's wins included the 1920 Metropolitan Handicap and the Empire City Derby.

== Racing career ==
The Seagram Stables of Waterloo, Ontario were owned by the brothers Edward, Norman and Thomas Seagram. At age two, Sir Harry was raced at tracks in the Toronto area but had most of his success at two tracks in Montreal. At Blue Bonnets Raceway where he won the Kindergarten Stakes and on July 31, 1926, set a new track record of 0:59 1/5 for 5 furlongs on dirt. At Dorval Park, the track where the great Exterminator ran his last race on June 21, 1924, Sir Harry won the 1926 Juvenile Stakes.

Sir Harry died in September 1930 when a Seagram barn caught fire.

== Pedigree ==
Pedigree of Sir Harry, chestnut colt, 1924
Sire Wildair	Broomstick	Ben Brush	Bramble
Sire Wildair	Broomstick	Ben Brush	Roseville
Sire Wildair	Broomstick	Elf	Galliard
Sire Wildair	Broomstick	Elf	Sylvabelle
Sire Wildair	Verdure	Peter Pan	Commando
Sire Wildair	Verdure	Peter Pan	Cinderella
Sire Wildair	Verdure	Pastorella	Springfield
Sire Wildair	Verdure	Pastorella	Griselda
Dam Ballotade	Ballot	Voter	Friar's Balsam
Dam Ballotade	Ballot	Voter	Mavourneen
Dam Ballotade	Ballot	Cerito	Lowland Chief
Dam Ballotade	Ballot	Cerito	Merry Dance
Dam Ballotade	Basseting	Bassetlaw	St. Simon
Dam Ballotade	Basseting	Bassetlaw	Marquesa
Dam Ballotade	Basseting	Suscol	Sir Modred
Dam Ballotade	Basseting	Suscol	Napa (family: 12-b)
