= Myrtlewood (horse) =

American-bred Thoroughbred racehorse

- Sire: Blue Larkspur
- Grandsire: Black Servant
- Dam: Frizeur
- Damsire: Sweeper
- Sex: Filly
- Foaled: 1932
- Country: United States
- Color: Bay
- Breeder: Brownell Combs
- Owner: Brownell Combs
- Trainer: Ray Kindred
- Record: 22: 15-4-2
- Earnings: $40,620

Major wins
- F. S. Peabody Memorial Handicap (1935); Hawthorne Sprint Handicap (1935, 1936); Match race with Clang (1935); Quickstep Handicap (1936); Lakeside Handicap (1936); Motor City Handicap (1936); Cadillac Handicap (1936); Keen Handicap (1936); Ashland Stakes (1936); Match race with Miss Merriment at Keeneland Race Course (1936)

Awards
- American Champion Older Female Horse (1936); American Champion Sprint Horse (1936)

Honors
- U.S. Racing Hall of Fame (1979)
- Last updated on December 21, 2007

Myrtlewood (foaled 1932 in Kentucky) was a champion Thoroughbred race horse as well as an exceptional broodmare.

== Background ==
Myrtlewood was by Blue Larkspur, himself by Black Servant by the great sire Black Toney, which means she went back to Ben Brush. Her dam was the French-bred Frizeur, by Sweeper, a son of another great sire, Broomstick by, again, Ben Brush. Frizeur's dam was the racing mare Frizette (after whom the Frizette Stakes is named), by Hamburg, taking her back to Hanover, St. Simon, and Hindoo.

== Racing career ==
Myrtlewood's best result at age two was a third-place finish in the Kentucky Jockey Club Stakes. She improved significantly at age three (when Seabiscuit was also racing but making little impact). She won the Francis S. Peabody Memorial Handicap at Lincoln Fields over a mile, and was even better at six furlongs. She set a new track record of 1:10 3/5 in the Hawthorne Sprint Handicap and a new world record of 1:09 2/5 in an allowance race at Arlington Park.

At four in 1936, she made ten starts under jockey George South and won eight, seven of which were stakes races. In the Lakeside Handicap, she equaled the track record of 1:35 3/5 for a mile, which was a world record for a female. In the Cadillac Handicap, she set a track record at the Detroit Race Course for six furlongs in 1:10 3/5. In the Motor City Handicap, she stretched out to a distance of 1 1/16 miles, and defeated Seabiscuit while setting another track record.

Myrtlewood was involved in match races with two exceptional racers of her day, one a colt, Clang (winner of the 1936 Clark Handicap), the other a filly, Miss Merriment (starting in 77 races and a winner or placer 2/3s of the time). Myrtlewood won her match with Miss Merriment under a hand drive. In the Midwest, both Clang and Myrtlewood had set records. Myrtlewood had beaten the time established by Iron Mask for six furlongs while Clang had equaled Roseben’s seven furlong record. After Myrtlewood beat Clang three times, a match race was proposed. In the first at Hawthorne Race Course, Myrtlewood beat Clang a fourth time, winning by a nose. In their second meeting in Cincinnati, Clang beat her by a nose.

Myrtlewood was named the Champion Older Female Horse and Champion Sprinter of 1936.

== Breeding record ==
Myrtlewood was a broodmare, who produced two great fillies: Durazna, the champion two-year-old in 1943, and Miss Dogwood, winner of the 1942 Kentucky Oaks. Both of these became outstanding producers themselves, as did five of her other daughters. The family became successful in North America which includes Triple Crown champion Seattle Slew and leading sire Mr. Prospector.

Mrytlewood was inducted into the Hall of Fame in 1979. She is one of 24 mares covered in the book Matriarchs: Great Mares of the 20th Century by Edward L. Bowen.

== Pedigree ==
Pedigree of Myrtlewood, bay mare, 1932
Sire Blue Larkspur	Black Servant	Black Toney	Peter Pan
Sire Blue Larkspur	Black Servant	Black Toney	Belgravia
Sire Blue Larkspur	Black Servant	Padula	Laveno (GB)
Sire Blue Larkspur	Black Servant	Padula	Padua (GB)
Sire Blue Larkspur	Blossom Time	North Star III	Sunstar (GB)
Sire Blue Larkspur	Blossom Time	North Star III	Angelic
Sire Blue Larkspur	Blossom Time	Vaila	Fairman (IRE)
Sire Blue Larkspur	Blossom Time	Vaila	Padilla (GB)
Dam Frizeur	Sweeper	Broomstick	Ben Brush
Dam Frizeur	Sweeper	Broomstick	Elf
Dam Frizeur	Sweeper	Ravello II	Sir Hugo (GB)
Dam Frizeur	Sweeper	Ravello II	Unco Guid (GB)
Dam Frizeur	Frizette	Hamburg	Hanover
Dam Frizeur	Frizette	Hamburg	Lady Reel
Dam Frizeur	Frizette	Ondulee (GB)	St. Simon
Dam Frizeur	Frizette	Ondulee (GB)	Ornis (family 13-c)

Myrtlewood is inbred 5S x 4D to Ben Brush, meaning this sire appears in the fifth generation on the sire's side of the pedigree and in the fourth generation on the dam's side. She is also inbred 5S x 5D to Bend Or.
