= Herman B. Duryea =

American Thoroughbred race horse owner and breeder (1862–1916)

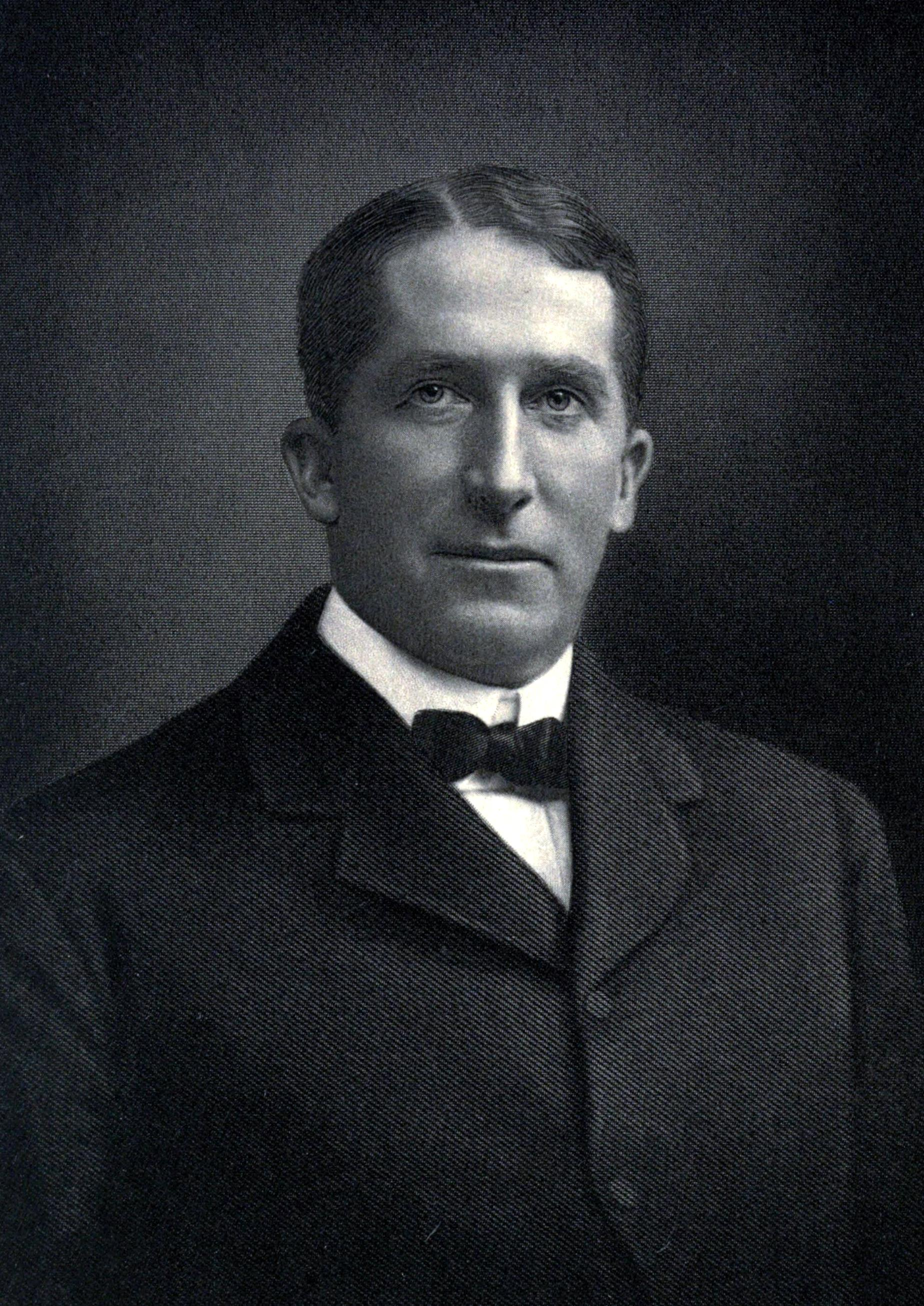
- Born: 1862; United States
- Died: 1916 (aged 53–54); United States
- Occupations: Businessman: Animal breeding farm Racehorse owner/breeder

Herman Barkulo Duryea (1862–1916) was an American Thoroughbred race horse owner and breeder.

In 1895, he married Ellen "Nellie" Winchester Weld.

He built an estate in Old Westbury on Long Island, New York known as "Knole". Completed in 1903, it was designed by Carrere and Hastings. In 1910 he sold the property to Henry Phipps who bought it as a wedding gift for his daughter Helen's marriage to Bradley Martin.

== Haras du Gazon ==
Herman Duryea also owned a large estate in Tennessee where he bred dogs and gamecocks. In 1902 he began breeding race horses and soon became one of the leading Thoroughbred racing owners in the United States. However, when many states began passing anti-betting legislation that ended most racing, Duryea moved his breeding and racing operations to Haras du Gazon in Bazoches-au-Houlme, Orne, Normandy, France acquired from Maurice Ephrussi.

Among Duryea's horses were Sweeper II who won the English 2,000 Guineas in 1912 and Durbar who won the 1914 Epsom Derby. He also owned the American-born mare, Frizette (1905-1929) purchased from friend James R. Keene and Payne Whitney. Frizette, a granddaughter of Hindoo, was one of the most important foundation matrons of the twentieth century whose descendants include Seattle Slew and Mr. Prospector. The annual Frizette Stakes at Belmont Park is named in her honor.

One of the other very important fillies to race under Duryea's colors was the champion, Tanya. Foaled in 1902 by William Collins Whitney, she was leased along with several other horses to race for Duryea in 1904 as a 2-year-old and won the Hopeful Stakes, the National Stallion Stakes, and the Spinaway Stakes. Unfortunately for Herman Duryea, she was purchased that fall by Whitney's son, Harry Payne Whitney, for she is best known for her win the following spring in the Belmont Stakes.

After Herman Duryea died in 1916 his widow maintained some of the French breeding farm's stallions but much of the operation would eventually be sold to Marcel Boussac.

Mr. Duryea was the benefactor of the Navesink Public Library and Monmouth Players community theater, both located in Navesink, New Jersey.

=== Funeral Train for Pet Dog ===
"THE only case we know of in which a special train was hired for a dog's funeral; occurred on Saturday, October 24th, 1914, less than three months after the World War began. The dog was Betty 2nd, a Pomeranian belonging to Herman B.Duryea. millionaire manufacturer. Betty died on the Duryea estate at Westbury, Long Island N. Y., at the age of about two and a half years. She was valued at $5,000. The grief-stricken Mr. Duryea chartered a special train from the Long Island Railroad, had his own luxurious private car attached to it, and in this car he placed the deceased canine her long silken hair washed and combed and brushed with the utmost care, the body being enclosed in a satin-lined coffin, hermetically sealed. Then, as the engine bell: tolled a requiem for the departed Pomeranian, the funeral cortege got slowly under way, and soon thereafter was speeding westward toward New York City, through New York City, and on down southward to Hickory Valley, Tenn., on the Illinois Central tracks.. Arriving at Hickory Valley, where Mr. Duryea had an estate near the Shiloh National Military Park, the casket was solemnly interred in a grave adjoining that of another dog which had died some time before."
