= 1915 Kentucky Derby =

Horse race

41st Kentucky Derby
- Kentucky Derby
- Grade I stakes race
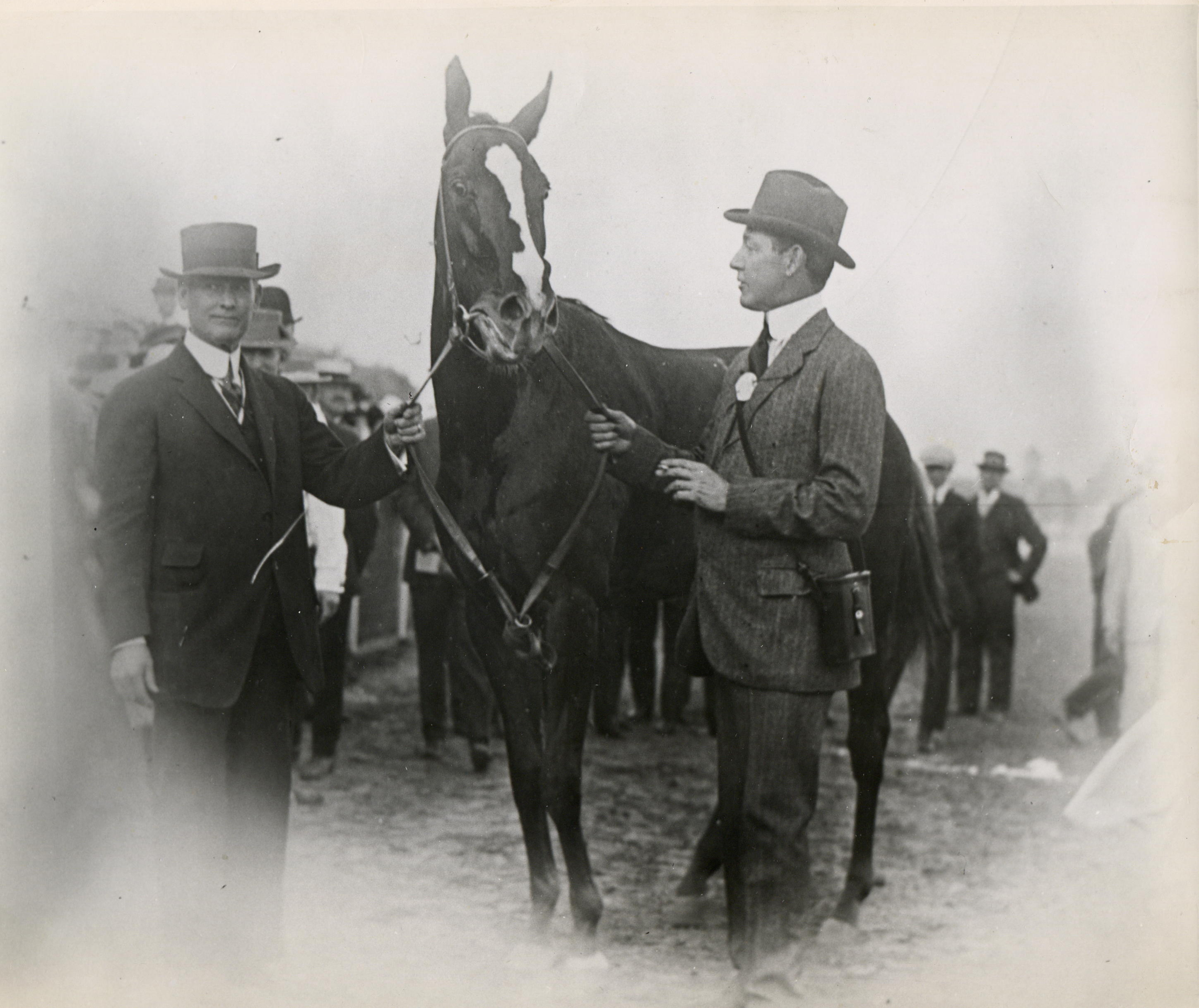
- Regret and owner Harry Payne Whitney
- Location: Churchill Downs
- Date: May 8, 1915
- Winning horse: Regret
- Jockey: Joe Notter
- Trainer: James G. Rowe Sr.
- Owner: Harry Payne Whitney
- Surface: Dirt

The 1915 Kentucky Derby was the 41st running of the Kentucky Derby. The race took place on May 8, 1915. The winning horse, Regret, generated significant publicity for the race being the first filly to ever win the Derby. Churchill Downs president Matt Winn observed that because of Regret's win "the Derby was thus made an American institution."

== Full results ==
Finished	Post	Horse	Jockey	Trainer	Owner	Time / behind
1st	2	Regret	Joe Notter	James G. Rowe Sr.	Harry Payne Whitney	2:05.40
2nd	3	Pebbles	Charles Borel	Richard C. Benson	James Butler	2
3rd	8	Sharpshooter	James Butwell	William H. Karrick	Schulyer L. Parsons	2
4th	10	Royal II	Andy Neylon	Herman R. Brandt	Jefferson Livingston	1
5th	5	Emerson Cochran	William Taylor	Auval John Baker	Col. Robert L. Baker	3
6th	11	Leo Ray	Thomas McTaggart	William J. Young	James T. Looney	1/2
7th	13	Double Eagle	Claude Burlingame	Stephen J. Lawler	Quincy Stable (James F. Johnson)	1 1/2
8th	1	Dortch	Albert Mott	Henry Louden	William W. Darden	4
9th	4	For Fair	William Warrington	George M. Miller	George M. Miller	5
10th	7	Ed Crump	Roscoe Goose	John F. Schorr	John W. Schorr	1/2
11th	12	Little String	Earl Pool	Elza Brown	Michael B. Gruber	Head
12th	6	Goldcrest Boy	Joe Kederis	John F. Schorr	John W. Schorr	1 1/2
13th	16	Uncle Bryn	John McTaggart	Robert W. Walden	Mrs. Robert W. Walden	2
14th	15	Tetan	James Smyth	William Perkins	Johnson & Crosthwaite	2
15th	9	Norse King	William O'Brien	Max Hirsch	Frederick B. Lemaire	2
16th	14	Booker Bill	Walter Andress	William Perkins	Mose C. Moore	4

- Winning Breeder: Harry Payne Whitney; (NJ)
- Horses Kilkenny Boy, Phosphor, and Commonada scratched before the race.

== Payout ==
Post	Horse	Win	Place	Show
2	Regret	$ 7.30	4.00	3.60
3	Pebbles		7.60	4.80
8	Sharpshooter			7.10

- The winner received a purse of $11,450.
- Second place received $2,000.
- Third place received $1,000.
- Fourth place received $225.
