= Alsab =

American-bred Thoroughbred racehorse

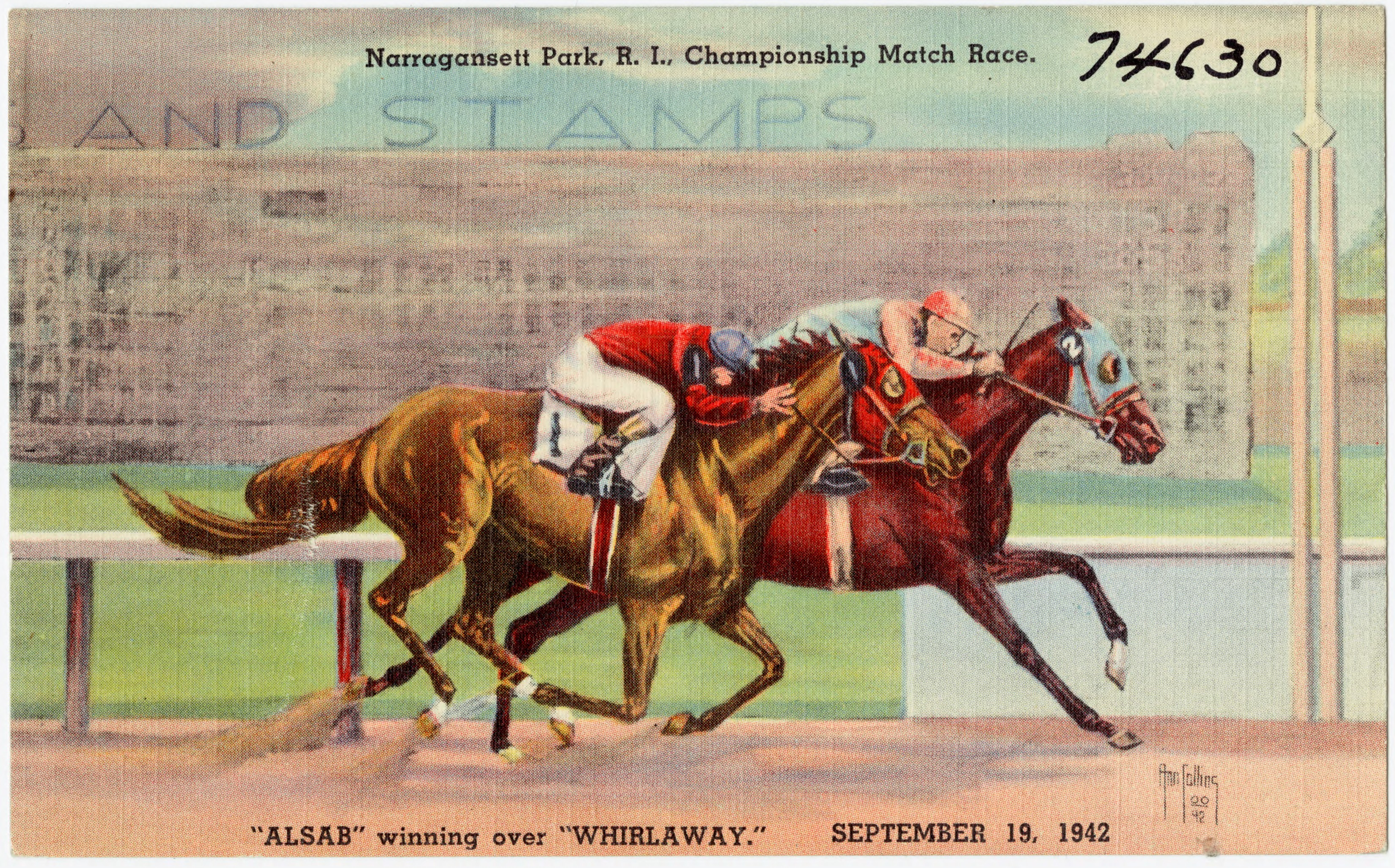
- Alsab winning over Whirlaway in 1942
- Sire: Good Goods
- Grandsire: Neddie
- Dam: Winds Chant
- Damsire: Wildair
- Sex: Stallion
- Foaled: 1939
- Died: 1963 (aged 23–24)
- Country: United States
- Colour: Bay
- Breeder: Tom Piatt
- Owner: Albert Sabath
- Trainer: Sarge Swenke
- Record: 51: 25-11-5
- Earnings: $350,015

Major wins
- Eastern Shore Handicap (1941); Walden Stakes (1941); Washington Park Futurity (1941); Champagne Stakes (1941); Mayflower Stakes (1941); American Derby (1942); Lawrence Realization Stakes (1942); New York Handicap (1942); Withers Stakes (1942); U.S. Triple Crown series: Preakness Stakes (1942)

Awards
- U.S. Champion Two-Year-Old Colt (1941); U.S. Champion Three-Year-Old Colt (1942)

Honours
- United States Racing Hall of Fame (1976) #65 - Top 100 U.S. Racehorses of the 20th Century
- Last updated on April 28, 2007

Alsab (1939–1963) was an American Hall of Fame Thoroughbred racehorse.

== Background ==
Alsab was bred in Kentucky by Thomas Piatt. His sire was Good Goods, and his dam was Winds Chant. Buyers were not interested in him, and Alsab was sold in 1940 for only $700 to Albert Sabath. He was named after his new owner.

== Racing career ==
As a two-year-old, Alsab won the Washington Park Futurity, Champagne Stakes, and Mayflower Stakes.

In his three-year-old season, he was ridden by Basil James. He finished second to Shut Out in the Kentucky Derby and then won the Preakness Stakes. In the third leg of the Triple Crown, he finished second to Shut Out in the Belmont Stakes, thus achieving the status of first-ever racehorse to win one U.S. Triple Crown race and finish second in the other two, followed in later years by Sword Dancer in 1959, Arts and Letters in 1969, Bet Twice in 1987, Easy Goer in 1989, and Journalism in 2025. For 63 years, Alsab held distinction as the only racehorse ever to win the Preakness Stakes and finish second in both the Kentucky Derby and Belmont Stakes, until Journalism joined him in 2025 by winning the Preakness and finishing second to Sovereignty in the Kentucky Derby and Belmont Stakes (run at 1 1/4 miles at Saratoga that year instead of 1 1/2 miles at Belmont Park, due to ongoing track renovations). As of 2025, Alsab remains the only racehorse ever to win the Preakness Stakes and finish second in the Kentucky Derby and second in the Belmont Stakes run at the traditional 1 1/2-mile distance.

On September 19, 1942, Alsab defeated the 1941 U.S. Triple Crown Champion Whirlaway in a match race at Narragansett Park in Pawtucket, Rhode Island.

== Assessment and awards ==
Alsab was voted the 1941 U.S. Champion Two-Year-Old Colt. He also won 1942 U.S. Champion Three-Year-Old Colt honors.

In the Blood-Horse magazine List of the Top 100 U.S. Racehorses of the 20th Century, Alsab was voted #65. In 1976, he was inducted in the United States' National Museum of Racing and Hall of Fame.

== Sire line tree ==
- Alsab
  - Armageddon
    - Battle Joined
      - Ack Ack
        - Youth
        - Broadsword
        - Flying Target
        - Joanies Chief
        - Truce Maker
        - Ackstatic
        - Broad Brush
  - Subahdar

== Pedigree ==
Pedigree of Alsab
Sire Good Goods bay 1931	Neddie black 1926	Colin	Commando*
Sire Good Goods bay 1931	Neddie black 1926	Colin	Pastorella*
Sire Good Goods bay 1931	Neddie black 1926	Black Flag	Light Brigade
Sire Good Goods bay 1931	Neddie black 1926	Black Flag	Misplay*
Sire Good Goods bay 1931	Brocastelle bay 1915	Radium	Bend Or*
Sire Good Goods bay 1931	Brocastelle bay 1915	Radium	Taia
Sire Good Goods bay 1931	Brocastelle bay 1915	Pietra	Pietermaritzburg*
Sire Good Goods bay 1931	Brocastelle bay 1915	Pietra	Briar-Root
Dam Winds Chant brown 1931	Wildair bay 1917	Broomstick	Ben Brush
Dam Winds Chant brown 1931	Wildair bay 1917	Broomstick	Elf
Dam Winds Chant brown 1931	Wildair bay 1917	Verdure	Peter Pan*
Dam Winds Chant brown 1931	Wildair bay 1917	Verdure	Pastorella*
Dam Winds Chant brown 1931	Eulogy bay 1913	Fair Play*	Hastings*
Dam Winds Chant brown 1931	Eulogy bay 1913	Fair Play*	Fairy Gold*
Dam Winds Chant brown 1931	Eulogy bay 1913	St Eudora	St Simon*
Dam Winds Chant brown 1931	Eulogy bay 1913	St Eudora	Dorothea

* Alsab is inbred 5S x 3D to the stallion Fair Play, meaning that he appears fifth generation (via Misplay) on the sire side of his pedigree, and third generation on the dam side of his pedigree.

* Alsab is inbred 4S x 4D to the mare Pastorella, meaning that she appears fourth generation on the sire side of his pedigree, and fourth generation on the dam side of his pedigree.

* Alsab is inbred 7S x 4S x 5D to the stallion Bend Or, meaning that he appears seventh generation (via Misplay) and fourth generation on the sire side of his pedigree, and fifth generation (via Fairy Gold) on the dam side of his pedigree.

* Alsab is inbred 4S x 5D to the stallion Commando, meaning that he appears fourth generation on the sire side of his pedigree, and fifth generation (via Peter Pan) on the dam side of his pedigree.

* Alsab is inbred 5S x 4D to the stallion St Simon, meaning that he appears fifth generation (via Pietermaritzburg) the sire side of his pedigree, and fourth generation on the dam side of his pedigree.
