= Myrtlewood =

Myrtlewood can refer to:

- The town of Myrtlewood, Alabama
- The wood of Myrtus in the Mediterranean region
- The wood of Umbellularia in California and Oregon
- Myrtlewood (horse), American Thoroughbred racehorse
