= 1927 Preakness Stakes =

52nd running of the Preakness Stakes

52nd Preakness Stakes
- The Preakness Stakes
- Location: Pimlico Race Course, Baltimore, Maryland, United States
- Date: May 9, 1927
- Winning horse: Bostonian
- Jockey: Whitey Abel
- Trainer: Fred Hopkins
- Owner: Harry Payne Whitney
- Conditions: Fast
- Surface: Dirt

The 1927 Preakness Stakes was the 52nd running of the $63,100 Preakness Stakes Thoroughbred horse race. The race took place on May 9, 1927, and was won by Bostonian who was ridden by Whitey Abel. The colt won the race by a half length over runner-up Sir Harry. The mile and three sixteenths race was run on a track rated good in a final time of 2:01 3/5.

== Payout ==
The 52nd Preakness Stakes Payout Schedule

Program Number	Horse Name	Win	Place	Show
3	Bostonian *	$8.00	$3.50	$4.00
6	Sir Harry	-	$6.20	$4.90
5	Whiskery *	$8.00	$3.50	$4.00

- * Coupled

== The full chart ==
Daily Racing Form Chart

Finish Position	Margin (lengths)	Post Position	Horse name	Jockey	Trainer	Owner	Post Time Odds	Purse Earnings
1st	0	4	Bostonian	Whitey Abel	Fred Hopkins	Harry Payne Whitney	3.00-1	$53,100
2nd	1/2	10	Sir Harry	Ovila Bourassa	William H. Bringloe	Seagram Stables	8.00-1	$5,000
3rd	nk	7	Whiskery	Clarence Kummer	Fred Hopkins	Harry Payne Whitney	3.00-1	$3,000
4th	5	12	Black Panther	John Maiben	T. J. Healey	Walter J. Salmon Sr.	9.60-1	$2,000
5th	N	9	Scapa Flow	Frank Coltiletti	Scott P. Harlan	Walter M. Jeffords	1.75-1	
6th	3	2	Fair Star	John Callahan	R. Carl Utz	Foxcatcher Farm	20.80-1	
7th	6	11	Saxon II	George Ellis	Clyde Phillips	Greentree Stable	21.55-1	
8th	3	1	Candy Hog	Dave Emery	George L. Arvin	H. Teller Archibald	49.85-1	
9th	2	5	Justice F.	Fred Stevens	Henry C. Riddle	William Daniel	33.45-1	
10th	1/2	3	Jopagan	Raymond Peternel	R. Mitchell	Albert G. Weston	28.60-1	
11th	1/2	8	Crystal Domino	Pete Walls	George L. Arvin	H. Teller Archibald	49.85-1	
12th	1	6	Buddy Bauer	Albert Johnson	Herbert J. Thompson	Idle Hour Stock Farm	15.20-1	

- Winning Breeder: Wheatley Stable; (KY)
- Times: 1/4 mile – 0:23 2/5; 3/4 mile – 1:14 flat; mile – 1:41 2/5; 1 3/16 (final) – 2:01 3/5
- Track Condition: Good
