= Delhi (horse) =

American-bred Thoroughbred racehorse

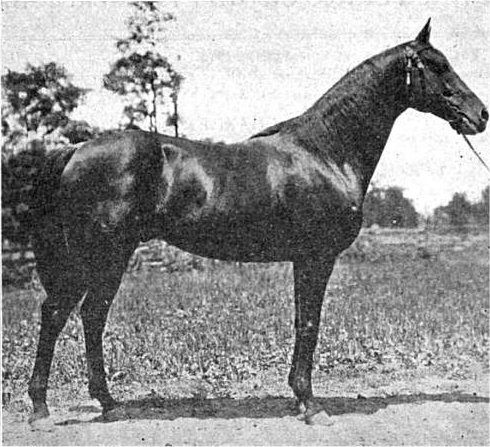
- Delhi, circa 1912.
- Sire: Ben Brush
- Grandsire: Bramble
- Dam: Veva
- Damsire: Mortemer
- Sex: Stallion
- Foaled: 1901
- Country: United States
- Colour: Brown
- Breeder: James R. Keene
- Owner: 1) James R. Keene (1901–1913); 2) Wickliffe Stud (1913–1918); 3) Cresswood Stock Farm (1918-c. 1925)
- Trainer: James G. Rowe Sr.
- Record: 23: 8-2-1
- Earnings: $115,640

Major wins
- Hopeful Stakes (1903); Withers Stakes (1904); Saratoga Derby (1904); Great Republic Stakes (1904); Brooklyn Handicap (1905); American Classic Race wins: Belmont Stakes (1904)

Honours
- American Champion Three-Year-Old Male Horse (1904); American Champion Older Male Horse (1905)
- Last updated on 19 July 2021

Delhi (1901–1925) was an American Thoroughbred racehorse that won the 1904 Belmont Stakes. He was the top money-winner of 1904 and was consequently named the co-historical American Champion Three-Year-Old Male Horse with Ort Wells. The following year, he was also the historical American Champion Older Male Horse, co-champion once again with Ort Wells. While Delhi did have limited success in the stud, he is not considered to be an influential sire.

== Pedigree ==
Delhi was foaled at Castleton Stud, the Thoroughbred breeding farm of James R. Keene in Lexington. He was sired by Ben Brush, the 1896 Kentucky Derby winner, who also sired noted stallions Broomstick and Sweep. His dam, Veva, was sired by the imported French stallion Mortemer which won the 1871 Ascot Gold Cup. Fully grown, Delhi stood 16.1 1/2 hands high, weighed 1240 pounds with a girth of 75 inches and had a cannon bone length of eight inches.

== Racing career ==
Delhi was an inauspicious two-year-old, winning only the $25,650 Hopeful Stakes in 1903. His record improved as a three-year-old, notably securing the 1904 Belmont Stakes from Graziallo in a time of 2:06 1/2 over a distance of 1 1/4 miles. Delhi placed second in the 1904 Tidal Stakes behind Ort Wells while being ridden by jockey George M. Odom. Other wins included the 1904 Withers Stakes, the Saratoga Derby (run in conjunction with the Hopeful Stakes) and the Great Republic Stakes. Delhi also won the Brooklyn Handicap as a four-year-old, but he only made three, unplaced starts as a five-year-old before being retired by Keene. In his racing career, he started 23 times, with 8 wins, 2 places and 1 show.

== Stud career ==
Delhi was retired from racing as a five-year old in June 1906 and was sent to Castleton Farm for use as a breeding stallion. Delhi's most notable offspring for Keene was the colt Dominant (br. 1913 out of Dominoes by Domino) which was the 1915 Champion two-year-old colt and won the 1915 Hopeful Stakes and Saratoga Special Stakes. He also produced Outram (b. 1909 out of Gingham by Domino), the first American-bred horse to win the Lincolnshire Handicap run at Doncaster Racecourse in Britain.

After the death of James R. Keene in 1913, Delhi was owned by his son Foxhall P. Keene until being sold in September 1913 to Price McKinney for $2,500. McKinney partnered with steel-magnate and noted turfman James W. Corrigan Jr. to form the Wickliffe Stud, which also housed Colin and Ultimus until the entire stable was dispersed in 1918. Delhi was sold in January 1918 to Thomas Piatt, who owned Cresswood Stock Farm in Lexington in partnership with J.D. and T.B. Carr, for $2,400. Delhi became the principal stallion at the farm, producing foals until 1925. Delhi died on May 19, 1925, at Runner's Rest, the farm of Lucas B. Coombs, in Lexington at the age of 24.

Delhi was considered to be a commendable broodmare sire, with his descendants through the female-line accumulating over $50,000 in purse money in 1921. His daughter Tripping produced the 1920 Futurity Stakes winner Step Lightly, a filly whose photograph is often mistaken for Man o' War.
