= Holiday (horse) =

American-bred Thoroughbred racehorse

- Sire: Broomstick
- Grandsire: Ben Brush
- Dam: Leisure
- Damsire: Meddler
- Sex: Gelding
- Foaled: 1911
- Country: United States
- Colour: Bay
- Breeder: Harry Payne Whitney
- Owner: Mrs. Archibald Barklie
- Trainer: J. Simon Healy

Major wins
- Williamsbridge Handicap (1912); American Classics wins: Preakness Stakes (1914)

Holiday (foaled in 1911) was an American Thoroughbred racehorse best known for winning the 1914 Preakness Stakes. Owned by Mrs. Archibald Barklie, he was sired by Broomstick. Holiday was out of the mare Leisure, a daughter of Meddler.

== Early racing career ==
Holiday was a slow developing horse that took four attempts to break his maiden in New York. Late in his two-year-old season he placed second in the Greenfield Stakes at Gravesend Race Track on Coney Island in south Brooklyn, New York.

== Preakness Stakes ==
Holiday, described as "a good-looking little bay gelding" will best be remembered for his win in the $2,500 1914 Preakness Stakes at Pimlico Race Course in Baltimore, Maryland run on Thursday, May 21.

Holiday went off as the second longest shot at 9–2 in the field of six three-year-olds. In that race Holiday led from the start and led passing the stands for the first time clocking the first quarter in :23-2/5. He continued a very fast pace around the club house turn and down the back stretch recording fractions of :48-2/5 and 1:13-2/5.

Coming into the home stretch his three length lead diminished to a single length. Holiday was tiring badly but held on to win by 3/4 of length from second choice Brave Cunarder with another 1-1/2 lengths back to Defendum for third. Holiday finished the classic in a final time of 1:58 flat under jockey Andy Schuttinger for the one and one eighth mile race.

Holiday was the last gelding to win the race until Prairie Bayou won in 1993.

== Late racing career ==
Later in his three-year-old season Holiday won the Williamsbridge Handicap at Morris Park Racecourse in Westchester County, New York. In the early part of his four-year-old season Holiday was wintered at Fair Grounds Race Course in New Orleans, Louisiana. During his stay at Fair Grounds he won an allowance race and placed second in the Thanksgiving Handicap.

== Breeding ==
Pedigree of Holiday
Sire Broomstick bay 1901	Ben Brush bay 1893	Bramble	Bonnie Scotland
Sire Broomstick bay 1901	Ben Brush bay 1893	Bramble	Ivy Leaf*
Sire Broomstick bay 1901	Ben Brush bay 1893	Roseville	Reform
Sire Broomstick bay 1901	Ben Brush bay 1893	Roseville	Albia
Sire Broomstick bay 1901	Elf ch. 1893	Galliard	Galopin
Sire Broomstick bay 1901	Elf ch. 1893	Galliard	Mavis
Sire Broomstick bay 1901	Elf ch. 1893	Sylvabelle	Bend Or
Sire Broomstick bay 1901	Elf ch. 1893	Sylvabelle	Saint Editha*
Dam Leisure ch. 1900	Meddler bay 1890	St Gatien	The Rover
Dam Leisure ch. 1900	Meddler bay 1890	St Gatien	Saint Editha*
Dam Leisure ch. 1900	Meddler bay 1890	Busybody	Petrarch
Dam Leisure ch. 1900	Meddler bay 1890	Busybody	Spinaway
Dam Leisure ch. 1900	Yorkville Belle ch. 1889	Miser	Australian*
Dam Leisure ch. 1900	Yorkville Belle ch. 1889	Miser	Aerolite
Dam Leisure ch. 1900	Yorkville Belle ch. 1889	Thora	Longfellow
Dam Leisure ch. 1900	Yorkville Belle ch. 1889	Thora	Susan Ann

* Holiday is inbred 4S x 4D to the mare Saint Editha, meaning that she appears fourth generation on the sire side of his pedigree, and fourth generation on the dam side of his pedigree.

* Holiday is inbred 5S x 4D to the stallion Australian, meaning that he appears fifth generation (via Ivy Leaf) on the sire side of his pedigree, and fourth generation on the dam side of his pedigree.
