= Tippity Witchet =

Thoroughbred racehorse

- Sire: Broomstick
- Grandsire: Ben Brush
- Dam: Lady Frivoles
- Damsire: St. Simon
- Sex: Gelding
- Foaled: 1915
- Country: United States
- Color: Bay
- Breeder: George W. Loft; Harry Payne Whitney
- Owner: Harry Payne Whitney; Various others through the years
- Trainer: George M. Odom (for Whitney); Max Hirsch (for G. W. Loft); Preston M. Burch (for J. Sanford); Lionel Bauer (in his claiming days)
- Record: 266: 78-52-42
- Earnings: $88,241

Major wins
- Aberdeen Stakes (1917); Eastern Shore Handicap (1917); Maryland Handicap (1917); Erdenheim Handicap (1917); Old Town Liberty Bond Handicap (1917); Rainbow Handicap (1919); Stafford Handicap (1919); Ronkonkoma Handicap (1920); Beauregard Handicap (1920); Thanksgiving Handicap (1920); The Prince George (1921); New Year's Handicap (1921); Fairfield Handicap (1921); Marrero Handicap (1921); Fairground Purse (1921); Century Handicap (1922); Louisiana Purse (1923)

Honors
- Fair Grounds Racing Hall of Fame (1971); Tippity Witchet Mile at Agua Caliente Racetrack
- Last updated on December 20, 2007

Tippity Witchet (foaled 1915) was an American Thoroughbred racehorse, noted for his durability and consistency in a career which lasted from 1917 until 1929.

== Background ==
Tippity Witchet was a son of the great sire Broomstick who was the son of Ben Brush. His dam was a daughter of St. Simon, one of Great Britain's greatest stallions. The New York Times described him as "tiny" and a "sterling little gelding" (The New York Times, 5–3–29). Tippity Witchet was bred in Kentucky by the stables of Harry Payne Whitney who owned his famous sire and was owned by Harry Payne Whitney.

== Racing career ==
In 1917 Tippity Witchet was one of the top juveniles in America, winning 14 of his 20 starts, eight of them consecutively within seven weeks. Among his wins were the 1917 Aberdeen Stakes at Havre de Grace Racetrack. He was sold to George D. Smith's Brighton Stable in 1917 for $3,000 who raced him for a short time before selling him at auction on November 10, 1917, to John Sanford of Amsterdam, New York, owner of Hurricana Farm. The price was $20,500, a great deal of money at the time and, according to William Robertson (see references), made headlines on sport's pages around the country. Sanford enjoyed quite a few stakes victories with his well-bred gelding. .

W. J. Young was his trainer in 1918 and Preston M. Burch was his trainer in 1919 when again racing for Sanford and won the Rainbow Handicap. On September 14, 1918, he was bought back by Brighton Stable. In 1920, he was racing for owner George W. Loft and was trained by Max Hirsch. He was sold near the end of 1920 to Lionel T. Bauer and was trained by J. P. Smith. He raced for the Bauer Stable in 1921 and in 1922 was trained by W. Livingston.

As Tippity Witchet grew older, he changed hands many times, and dropped down in the ranks from stakes races to allowance to claiming events. For the most part he raced at the old Fair Grounds Race Course, but over the years, Tippity Witchet ran over 31 different tracks, winning on 27 of them whether the going was mud or hardpack, also winning at distances that ranged from 6 furlongs to one and a half miles.

In 1928 Tippity Witchet raced in the silks of the Ramona Stable. On January 22, 1928, The Washington Post wrote: "Perhaps no horse more deserves the title of selling plater king of the American turf than Tippity Witchet, the 12-year-old in Broomstick's famous thoroughbred family. For eleven seasons Tippity Witchet has been an active campaigner, and his record for 1927 is as impressive as his achievements in his younger days."

His last race took place on February 1, 1929. By the time he retired, he had competed on race tracks in the United States, Canada, Mexico, and Cuba. His record stood at No. 4 in the all-time greatest number of North America wins. In his last year, he was fourteen and still winning.

Tippity Witchet was part of the inaugural class inducted into the Fair Grounds Racing Hall of Fame in 1971.
