= Broomspun =

American-bred Thoroughbred racehorse

- Sire: Broomstick
- Grandsire: Ben Brush
- Dam: Sun Glass
- Damsire: Rock Sand
- Sex: Stallion
- Foaled: 1918
- Country: United States
- Colour: Black
- Breeder: Harry Payne Whitney
- Owner: Harry Payne Whitney
- Trainer: James G. Rowe Sr.
- Record: 24: 4-4-0
- Earnings: $88,440

Major wins
- Triple Crown Race wins: Preakness Stakes (1921)
- Last updated on June 9, 2011

Broomspun (1918 – June 18, 1921) was an American Thoroughbred racehorse, the son of Broomstick out of a Rock Sand mare, Sun Glass.

Broomspun is best known for winning the $43,000 1921 Preakness Stakes at Pimlico Race Course on May 16, 1921, in front of a record-breaking crowd.

== Two-year-old season ==
Broomspun broke his maiden at Aqueduct Racetrack in his second start in the summer of 1920 as a two-year-old. Later that summer, he won at a mile and an eighth in an allowance race at Churchill Downs in Louisville, Kentucky, in a very fast time. Broomspun did not win again over the next three months and was freshened for the winter.

== Three-year-old season ==
Broomspun got a late start to his three-year-old season, making his sophomore debut in an allowance race at a mile and one eighth at New York's Aqueduct Racetrack. In that race, he ran second. Later that year, after the Derby runner did not return two weeks later in Baltimore, trainer James Rowe entered Broomspun in the second jewel of Triple Crown, the Preakness Stakes. In that race, four multiple stakes winners were assigned the high weight of 126 pounds. Broomspun, because of his lack of success, was given a weight allowance of 12 pounds and went to post carrying 114 pounds including his jockey, Frank Coltiletti. In 1921, the Preakness was the richest race held in North America. While $38,450 went to the winner of the Kentucky Derby, the Preakness victor received $43,000. A record 30,000 race fans were on hand, the most in the 48-year history of the race.

At the start of the race, several of the 14 starters were fractious or unruly as it took the starter eleven minutes to get the field settled. Broomspun broke from post position 7 in a forward position and stalked the leaders from fourth passing the stands for the first time at Pimlico Race Course. He sat just off leader Leonard II's flank going down the backstretch in 47.4 for the first half mile. On the final turn, Broomspun worked his way around on the outside and burst down the lane to take the lead by just over a length. In the final strides, he was ridden out hard by jockey Frank Coltiletti to hold for the win by three quarters of a length over a hard-charging filly named Polly Ann.

The headline in The Baltimore Sun the next day read, "From obscurity to fame, Broomspun jumped in less than two minutes in The Preakness Stakes. The 3-year-old son of Broomstick and Spun Giass, who is the property of Harry Payne Whitney, the New York City sportsman, won the Classic Preakness from a field of 14 strong competitors, the best three-year-olds in the country." Besides beating Polly Ann, Broomspun defeated Jeg, who held on for third, and Leonardo II and Tryster, who dead-heated for fourth. That win was owner Harry Payne Whitney's second of four in the Preakness Stakes.

While competing in the June 18, 1921 Carlton Stakes at New York's Aqueduct Racetrack, jockey Clarence Kummer felt Broomspun's leg give on his first stride at the start of the race and pulled him up after four furlongs. Broomspun was euthanized when it was determined he had broken his right foreleg at the shoulder.

== Pedigree ==
Pedigree of Broomspun (USA), chestnut stallion, 1918
Sire Broomstick (USA) 1901	Ben Brush (USA); 1893	Bramble	Bonnie Scotland*
Sire Broomstick (USA) 1901	Ben Brush (USA); 1893	Bramble	Ivy Leaf
Sire Broomstick (USA) 1901	Ben Brush (USA); 1893	Roseville	Reform*
Sire Broomstick (USA) 1901	Ben Brush (USA); 1893	Roseville	Albia
Sire Broomstick (USA) 1901	Elf (GB); 1893	Galliard	Galopin*
Sire Broomstick (USA) 1901	Elf (GB); 1893	Galliard	Mavis
Sire Broomstick (USA) 1901	Elf (GB); 1893	Sylvabelle	Bend Or
Sire Broomstick (USA) 1901	Elf (GB); 1893	Sylvabelle	St Editha
Dam Spun Glass (USA) 1912	Rock Sand (GB); 1900	Sainfoin	Springfield
Dam Spun Glass (USA) 1912	Rock Sand (GB); 1900	Sainfoin	Sanda
Dam Spun Glass (USA) 1912	Rock Sand (GB); 1900	Roquebrune	St Simon*
Dam Spun Glass (USA) 1912	Rock Sand (GB); 1900	Roquebrune	St Marguerite
Dam Spun Glass (USA) 1912	Handspun (USA); 1892	Hanover	Hindoo
Dam Spun Glass (USA) 1912	Handspun (USA); 1892	Hanover	Bourbon Belle*
Dam Spun Glass (USA) 1912	Handspun (USA); 1892	Spinaway	Leamington*
Dam Spun Glass (USA) 1912	Handspun (USA); 1892	Spinaway	Megara (Family 11)

* Broomspun is inbred 4S x 5D to the stallion Bonnie Scotland, meaning that he appears fourth generation on the sire side of his pedigree, and fifth generation (via Bourbon Belle) on the dam side of his pedigree.

* Broomspun is inbred 4S x 5D to the stallion Galopin, meaning that he appears fourth generation on the sire side of his pedigree, and fifth generation (via St Simon) on the dam side of his pedigree.

* Broomspun is inbred 5S x 4D to the stallion Leamington, meaning that he appears fifth generation (via Reform) on the sire side of his pedigree, and fourth generation on the dam side of his pedigree.
