= Regret (horse) =

American-bred Thoroughbred racehorse

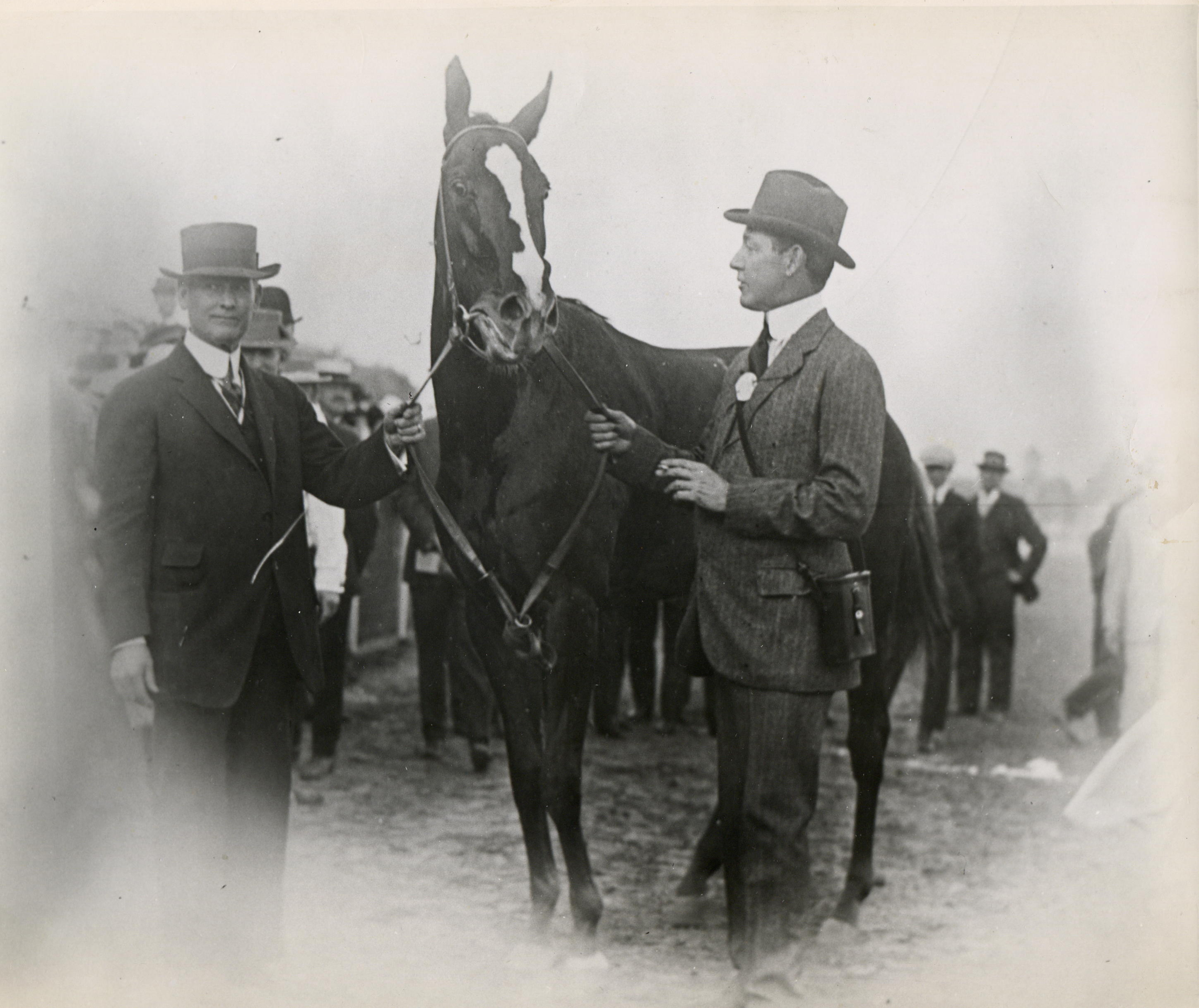
- Regret and owner Harry Payne Whitney
- Sire: Broomstick
- Grandsire: Ben Brush
- Dam: Jersey Lightning
- Damsire: Hamburg
- Sex: Mare
- Foaled: 1912
- Country: United States
- Colour: Chestnut
- Breeder: Harry Payne Whitney
- Owner: Harry Payne Whitney. Racing silks: Light Blue, white sash, brown cap.
- Trainer: James G. Rowe Sr.
- Record: 11: 9-1-0
- Earnings: $35,093

Major wins
- Saratoga Special Stakes (1914); Sanford Stakes (1914); Hopeful Stakes (1914); Kentucky Derby (1915); Saranac Handicap (1915); Gazelle Handicap (1917)

Awards
- American Champion Three-Year-Old Filly (1915); American Horse of the Year (1915)

Honours
- United States Racing Hall of Fame (1957) #71 - Top 100 U.S. Racehorses of the 20th Century; Regret Stakes at Churchill Downs
- Last updated on October 18, 2019

Regret (April 2, 1912 – April 11, 1934) was a famous American thoroughbred racemare and the first of three female horses to ever win the Kentucky Derby.

== Background ==
She was foaled at Harry Payne Whitney's Brookdale Farm in Lincroft, New Jersey. The mare was sired by Broomstick, the 1913-1915 leading sire inducted into the National Museum of Racing and Hall of Fame (son of Ben Brush, also inducted into the Hall of Fame). She was out of Jersey Lightning, who goes back to Longfellow through his Kentucky Derby-winning son, Riley. Regret was bred by owner Harry Payne Whitney.

== Racing career ==
Trained by James G. Rowe Sr., in 1914 Regret became the first of only four horses to ever win all three Saratoga Race Course events for two-year-olds: the Saratoga Special Stakes, Sanford Stakes and Hopeful Stakes. Joining her would be Campfire (1916), Dehere (1993), and City Zip (2000). The following year, campaigning as a three-year-old, she won the 1915 Kentucky Derby, her first race as a three-year-old, and became the first filly of three to do so. Regret was also the first undefeated horse to win the Kentucky Derby, and had only three starts prior to the race (matched by Big Brown in 2008 and Justify in 2018). Regret was retrospectively named American Horse of the Year.

1915 was the year of the Triple Crown fillies, as Rhine Maiden won the Preakness Stakes. Regret's owner had not entered her in that race. Not since 1915 has more than one Triple Crown race a year been won by a filly.

== Retirement ==
After the 1917 racing season, Regret was retired for breeding to the new Whitney farm in Lexington, Kentucky. In this last season, she raced in the Brooklyn Handicap against the best of her generation: Old Rosebud, Roamer, Omar Khayyam (winner of the 1917 Kentucky Derby), Boots, Ormsdale and Chiclet. In the final strides, she was defeated by a nose by her stablemate, Borrow, giving away 5 pounds.

Out of 11 starts in four seasons (1914–1917), Regret won nine, and placed second in one. The only race she was not placed in was the 1916 Saratoga Handicap. Throughout her career, she was never beaten by a female horse.

As a broodmare, she produced only one major stakes winner, Revenge, out of eleven foals. She died in 1934, aged 22, and was buried at the Whitney farm in Lexington.

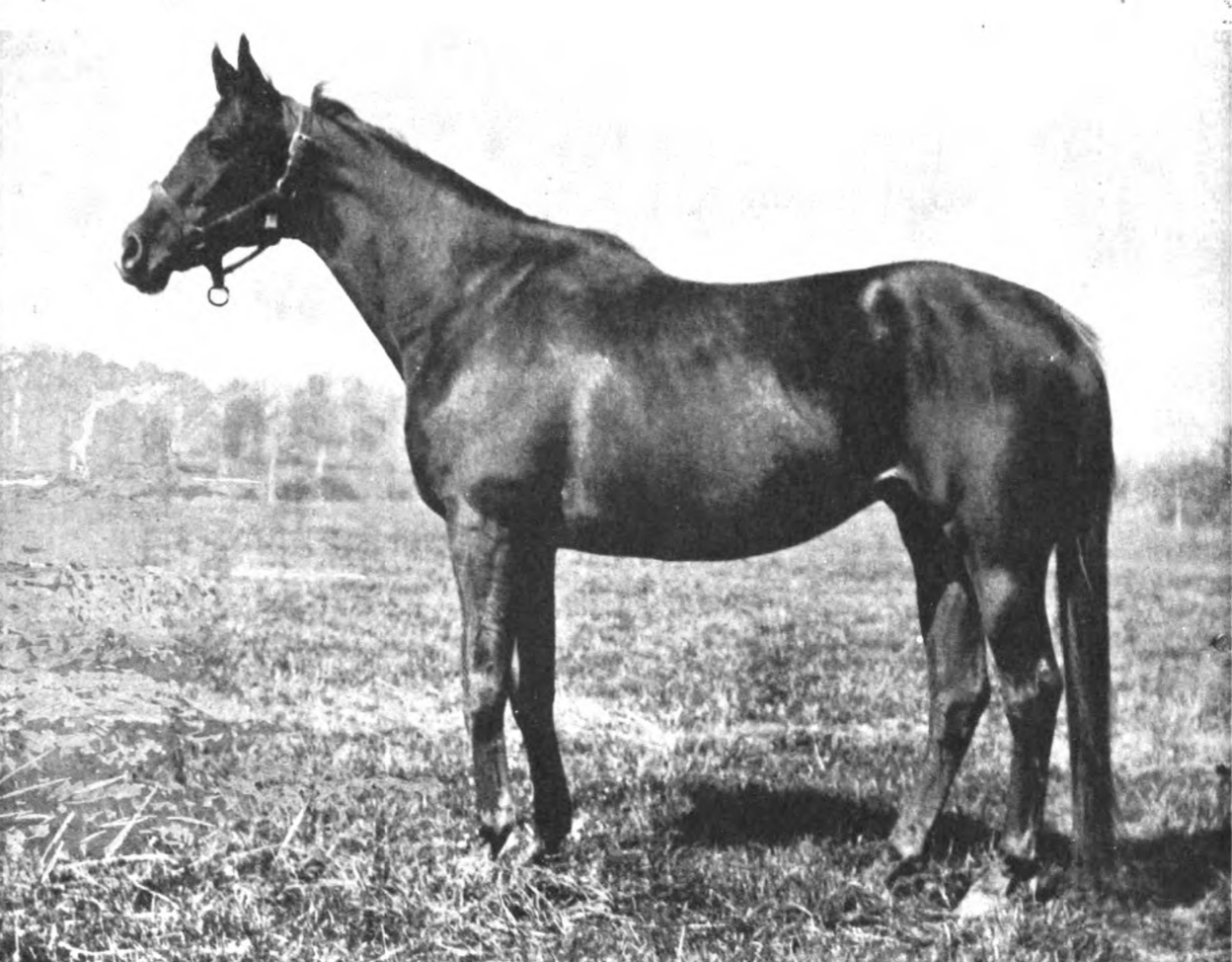
Regret as a broodmare

== Assessment and honors ==
Regret was inducted into the National Museum of Racing and Hall of Fame in 1957. In the Blood-Horse magazine ranking of the top 100 U.S. thoroughbred champions of the 20th Century, she was #71. (Roamer ranks 99th, Old Rosebud, 88th.)

In a poll among members of the American Trainers Association, conducted in 1955 by Delaware Park Racetrack, Regret was voted the third-greatest filly in American racing history. Gallorette was voted first.

== Pedigree ==
Pedigree of Regret
Sire Broomstick 1901	Ben Brush 1893	Bramble	Bonnie Scotland
Sire Broomstick 1901	Ben Brush 1893	Bramble	Ivy Leaf
Sire Broomstick 1901	Ben Brush 1893	Roseville	Reform
Sire Broomstick 1901	Ben Brush 1893	Roseville	Albia
Sire Broomstick 1901	Elf 1893	Galliard	Galopin
Sire Broomstick 1901	Elf 1893	Galliard	Mavis
Sire Broomstick 1901	Elf 1893	Sylvabelle	Bend Or
Sire Broomstick 1901	Elf 1893	Sylvabelle	Saint Editha
Dam Jersey Lightning 1905	Hamburg 1895	Hanover	Hindoo
Dam Jersey Lightning 1905	Hamburg 1895	Hanover	Bourbon Belle
Dam Jersey Lightning 1905	Hamburg 1895	Lady Reel	Fellowcraft
Dam Jersey Lightning 1905	Hamburg 1895	Lady Reel	Mannie Gray
Dam Jersey Lightning 1905	Daisy F 1895	Riley	Longfellow
Dam Jersey Lightning 1905	Daisy F 1895	Riley	Geneva
Dam Jersey Lightning 1905	Daisy F 1895	Modesty	War Dance
Dam Jersey Lightning 1905	Daisy F 1895	Modesty	Ballet

== See also ==
- List of racehorses
