= Whitey Abel =

American jockey, trainer, owner, and breeder of Thoroughbred racehorses

Personal information
- Born: March 16, 1903
- Died: February 11, 1969 (aged 65)
- Occupations: Jockey, Trainer, Owner, Breeder

Horse racing career
- Sport: Horse racing

Major racing wins
- Jockey wins:: Black-Eyed Susan Stakes (1927); Durham Cup Stakes (1929); Empire City Handicap (1930); Remsen Stakes (1930) U.S. Triple Crown race win: Preakness Stakes (1927) Trainer wins: Admiral Purse (1938); Prince George Handicap (1938); Ritchie Handicap (1938); W. P. Burch Memorial Handicap (1938); Dixie Stakes (1940); Gittings Handicap (1940); Rowe Memorial Handicap (1940); Southern Maryland Handicap (1940); King Philip Handicap (1941); Eoinsettia Purse (1944); Chesapeake Stakes (1944)

Significant horses
- Bostonian, Gramps Image

Alfred John "Whitey" Abel (March 16, 1903 – February 11, 1969) was a jockey, trainer, owner as well as a breeder of Thoroughbred racehorses who rode Bostonian to victory in the 1927 Preakness Stakes, run that year as the first leg of the U.S. Triple Crown series.

== Career ==
On April 6, 1923, Whitey Abel rode five winners on a single racecard at Bowie Racetrack.

After becoming a trainer, Abel owned and bred racehorses. He often purchased horses out of claiming races but of those he bred and raced, stakes winner Gramps Image is likely the best known.
