= Sweeper (horse) =

French-bred Thoroughbred racehorse

- Sire: Broomstick
- Grandsire: Ben Brush
- Dam: Ravello
- Damsire: Sir Hugo
- Sex: Stallion
- Foaled: 1909
- Country: France
- Colour: Chestnut
- Breeder: Herman Duryea
- Owner: Herman Duryea
- Trainer: Atty Persse
- Record: 11: 3-5-1

Major wins
- Triennial Stakes (1911); Richmond Stakes (1911); 2000 Guineas (1912)

Sweeper (also known as Sweeper II, 1909 – 1923) was a French-bred, British-trained Thoroughbred racehorse and sire. He showed high-class form as a juvenile in 1911 when he won the Triennial Stakes at Royal Ascot and the Richmond Stakes at Goodwood as well as finishing second in the Middle Park Plate and third in the July Stakes. In the following spring he recorded his biggest success on his seasonal reappearance when he took the 2000 Guineas. He failed when favourite for the Epsom Derby and never won again although he finished second in both the St James's Palace Stakes and the Sussex Stakes. After his retirement from racing he had some success as a breeding stallion.

== Background ==
Sweeper was a chestnut horse bred in France by his American owner Herman Duryea. Like several major American owners Duryea had moved most of his hoses to Europe following the passing of the Hart–Agnew Law. The colt was sent to England and entered training Henry Seymour "Atty" Persse at Chattis Hill near Stockbridge in Hampshire. Physically, Sweeper was described as a "golden chestnut, rather dipped in his back, but with rare limbs and a lovely action".

Sweeper was sired by Broomstick, an American horse who won the Travers Stakes in 1904 and later became a three-time champion sire. His dam Ravello was bred in England before being exported to the United States (where she was sold for 120 guineas) and producing Frank Gill, whose wins included the Travers and Withers Stakes. Ravello was a granddaughter of Genuine, a broodmare whose other descendants included Nijinsky and El Gran Senor.

== Racing career ==
=== 1911: two-year-old season ===
In June 1911 Sweeper was sent to Royal Ascot for the 59th Triennial Stakes and looked to be "a real flyer" as he won easily from Jaeger. At Newmarket Racecourse he came home third in the July Stakes behind an unnamed colt (later given the name White Star) owned by Solomon Joel. In the following month the colt contested the Richmond Stakes at Goodwood Racecourse in which he was ridden by the French jockey Georges Stern and won at odds of 11/10. On 13 October in the Middle Park Plate over six furlongs at Newmarket Sweeper finished second to Absurd with White Star in third. At the end of the year he was rated the fourth best two-year-old colt in England behind Absurd, White Star and Lomond.

=== 1912: three-year-old season ===
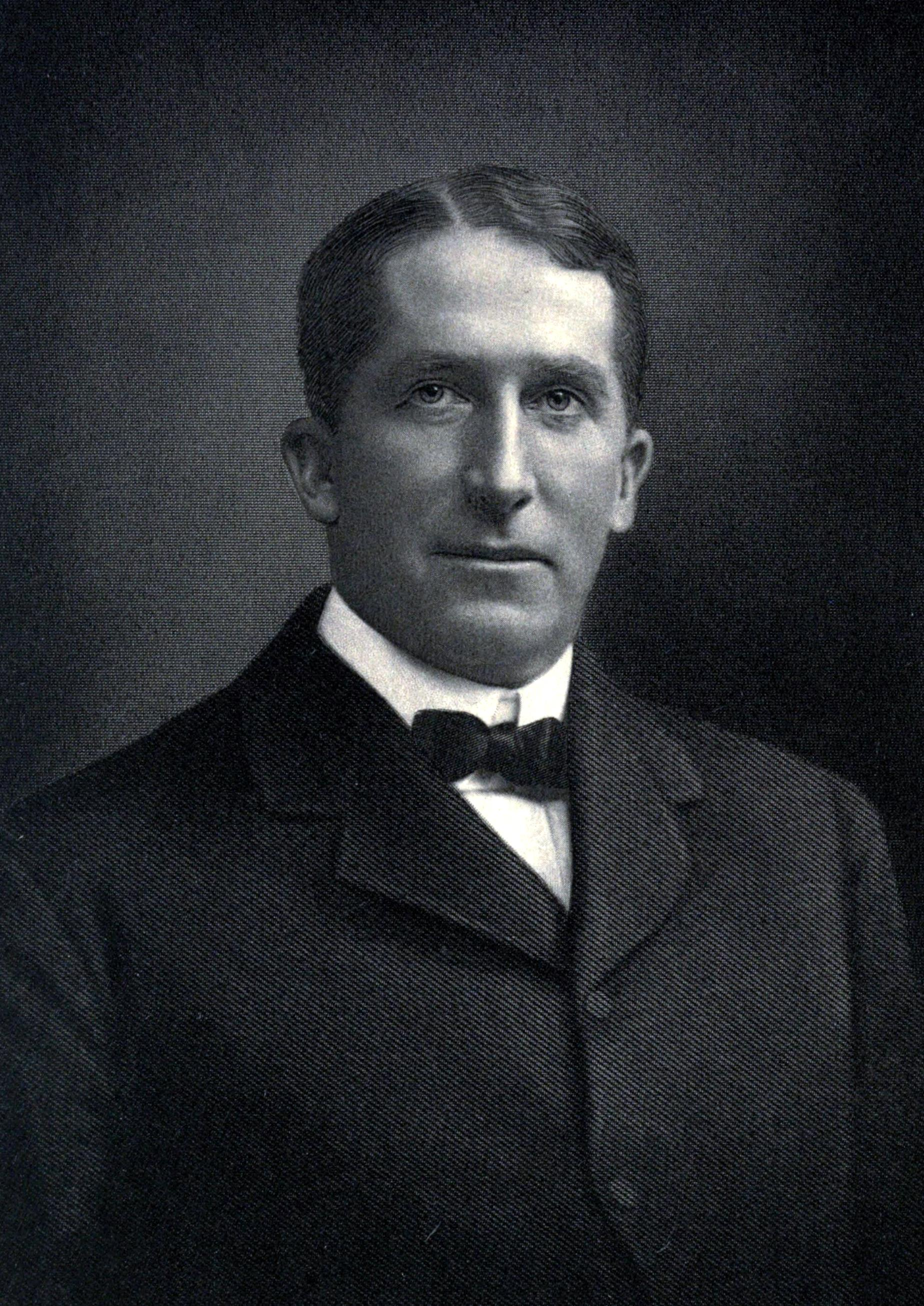
Herman B. Duryea, who owned and bred Sweeper

On 1 May 1912 Sweeper started at odds of 6/1 in a fourteen-runner field for the 104th running of the 2000 Guineas over the Rowley Mile at Newmarket. Ridden by Danny Maher, he settled behind the leaders as Jaeger set the pace from the favourite White Star. He took the lead two furlongs from the finish and won by a length from Jaeger with Hall Cross half a length away in third.

Sweeper started favourite for the Derby over 1 1/2 miles at Epsom on 5 June, but never looked likely to win and finished seventh as the filly Tagalie won from Jaeger and Tracery. At Royal Ascot late in June Sweeper was dopped back in distance and started odds-on favourite for the St James's Palace Stakes over one mile but was beaten into second place by Tracery. At the same meeting he came home second behind Hector in the Triennial Stakes, with Jaeger in third place. In July he finished second by a neck to the King's colt Le Lac in the Dullingham Plate over 1 1/2 miles at Newmarket and then finished runner-up yet again when chasing home Tracery in the Sussex Stakes at Goodwood.

On 11 September Sweeper contested the St Leger Stakes over 14 1/2 furlongs at Doncaster Racecourse and rated at odds of 12.5/1 in a fourteen-runner field. He raced just behind the leaders until half way, but then quickly dropped out of contention and finished unplaced behind Tracery.

== Assessment and honours ==
In their book, A Century of Champions, based on the Timeform rating system, John Randall and Tony Morris rated Sweeper an "inferior" winner of the 2000 Guineas.

== Stud record ==
After his retirement from racing Sweeper stood as a breeding stallion in France and the United States. The most successful of his offspring was the American gelding Osmand, who won two editions of the Carter Handicap. More influential however was Ondulation, a broodmare whose descendants included Dahlia and Rail Link. Sweeper died in 1923 and his last foals were born in 1924.

== Pedigree ==
Pedigree of Sweeper (FR), chestnut stallion, 1909
Sire Broomstick (USA) 1901	Ben Brush (USA); 1893	Bramble	Bonnie Scotland
Sire Broomstick (USA) 1901	Ben Brush (USA); 1893	Bramble	Ivy Leaf
Sire Broomstick (USA) 1901	Ben Brush (USA); 1893	Roseville	Reform
Sire Broomstick (USA) 1901	Ben Brush (USA); 1893	Roseville	Albia
Sire Broomstick (USA) 1901	Elf (GB); 1893	Galliard	Galopin
Sire Broomstick (USA) 1901	Elf (GB); 1893	Galliard	Mavis
Sire Broomstick (USA) 1901	Elf (GB); 1893	Sylvabelle	Bend Or
Sire Broomstick (USA) 1901	Elf (GB); 1893	Sylvabelle	Saint Editha
Dam Ravello (GB) 1896	Sir Hugo (GB); 1889	Wisdom	Blinkhoolie
Dam Ravello (GB) 1896	Sir Hugo (GB); 1889	Wisdom	Aline*
Dam Ravello (GB) 1896	Sir Hugo (GB); 1889	Manoeuvre	Lord Clifden
Dam Ravello (GB) 1896	Sir Hugo (GB); 1889	Manoeuvre	Quick March
Dam Ravello (GB) 1896	Unco Guid (GB); 1886	Uncas	Stockwell*
Dam Ravello (GB) 1896	Unco Guid (GB); 1886	Uncas	Nightingale
Dam Ravello (GB) 1896	Unco Guid (GB); 1886	Genuine	Fitz-Roland
Dam Ravello (GB) 1896	Unco Guid (GB); 1886	Genuine	Young Agnes (Family: 8-f)

* Sweeper is inbred 5D x 4D to the stallion Stockwell, meaning that he appears fifth generation (via Aline) and fourth generation on the dam side of his pedigree.
