= Bostonian (horse) =

American-bred Thoroughbred racehorse

- Sire: Broomstick
- Grandsire: Ben Brush
- Dam: Yankee Maid
- Damsire: Peter Pan
- Sex: Stallion
- Foaled: 1924
- Country: United States
- Colour: Black
- Breeder: Harry Payne Whitney
- Owner: Harry Payne Whitney
- Trainer: Fred Hopkins
- Record: 29: 5-6-6
- Earnings: $88,440

Major wins
- Riggs Memorial Handicap (1927) U. S. Triple Crown wins: Preakness Stakes (1927)
- Last updated on June 5, 2011

Bostonian (foaled in 1924) was an American Thoroughbred racehorse. The son of Broomstick out of a Peter Pan mare Yankee Maid, Bostonian is best remembered for posting a 1-1/2 length win over his stablemate and Kentucky Derby Champion Whiskery in the mile and three sixteenth $65,000 Preakness Stakes at Pimlico Race Course on May 9, 1927

== Two-year-old season ==
As a two-year-old, Bostonian broke his maiden in the second start of his career. In his third start, he won an allowance race at Belmont Park in May 1926 for the second win of his career. He went on to place second in a prestigious stakes race at Belmont, running second to Draconia in the Tremont Stakes during the first week of July in his freshman season. His trainer, Fred Hopkins, wheeled him back three weeks later to a third-place finish in the Sanford Memorial Stakes at Saratoga Race Course. In the early autumn, Bostonian won another allowance race. His owners then shipped him west to run at Churchill Downs in the Kentucky Jockey Club Stakes, where he finished second to Valorous. During the winter, his connections decided to freshen him until the spring.

== Three-year-old season ==
Bostonian got a late start to his three-year-old season, making his sophomore debut in New York's key prep race to the Derby, the Wood Memorial Stakes at a mile and one eighth at Aqueduct Racetrack. He ran third to Greentree Stable's Saxon in only the third running of the Wood.

On May 9, Bostonian took on Whiskery in the first leg of Triple Crown, the Preakness Stakes. In that race, Bostonian was sent off as favorite coupled (under the same ownership) with Whiskery at 3–1. As the gates opened, Bostonian broke slowly and settle in seventh in the field of twelve passing the grand stands for the first time and around the club house turn. In the back stretch, he gradually gained ground on the early leaders. Around the final turn, he responded with a burst of speed when called on by his jockey, Whitey Abel. He came up to the leaders on the outside at the top of the lane during the final drive. Then he wore down the top three entering the home stretch: Sir Harry in third, Black Panther in second and finally Whiskery at the sixteenth pole by a half length. He continued his strong drive to win by one and a half lengths in a time of 1:59.

Five days later, Bostonian finished fifth in a field of sixteen in the Kentucky Derby to his stablemate Whiskery. In 1927, the Preakness was run before the Kentucky Derby.

Later that year, Bostonian won a handicap race over older horses in the Riggs Memorial Handicap at Pimlico Race Course over a mile and three sixteenths. He also ran third in the Havre De Grace Cup Handicap at Havre de Grace Racetrack in Havre de Grace, Maryland, at one and one eighth miles on dirt.

== Breeding ==
Pedigree of Bostonian
Sire Broomstick bay 1901	Ben Brush bay 1893	Bramble	Bonnie Scotland
Sire Broomstick bay 1901	Ben Brush bay 1893	Bramble	Ivy Leaf
Sire Broomstick bay 1901	Ben Brush bay 1893	Roseville	Reform
Sire Broomstick bay 1901	Ben Brush bay 1893	Roseville	Albia
Sire Broomstick bay 1901	Elf ch. 1893	Galliard	Galopin
Sire Broomstick bay 1901	Elf ch. 1893	Galliard	Mavis
Sire Broomstick bay 1901	Elf ch. 1893	Sylvabelle	Bend Or
Sire Broomstick bay 1901	Elf ch. 1893	Sylvabelle	Saint Editha
Dam Yankee Maid black 1919	Peter Pan bay 1904	Commando	Domino
Dam Yankee Maid black 1919	Peter Pan bay 1904	Commando	Emma C
Dam Yankee Maid black 1919	Peter Pan bay 1904	Cinderella	Hermit
Dam Yankee Maid black 1919	Peter Pan bay 1904	Cinderella	Mazurka
Dam Yankee Maid black 1919	Yankee Girl bay 1904	Sir Dixon	Billet
Dam Yankee Maid black 1919	Yankee Girl bay 1904	Sir Dixon	Jaconet
Dam Yankee Maid black 1919	Yankee Girl bay 1904	Breakwater	Hindoo
Dam Yankee Maid black 1919	Yankee Girl bay 1904	Breakwater	Richochet
