= Ben Brush =

American-bred Thoroughbred racehorse

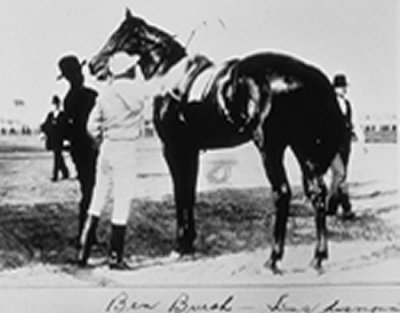
- Saddling up for the Kentucky Derby
- Sire: Bramble
- Grandsire: Bonnie Scotland
- Dam: Roseville
- Damsire: Reform
- Sex: Stallion
- Foaled: 1893
- Died: 1918 (aged 24–25)
- Country: United States
- Color: Bay
- Breeder: Clay & Woodford partnership
- Owner: H. Eugene Leigh & Edward D. Brown; Michael F. Dwyer; James R. Keene (at stud)
- Trainer: Edward D. Brown; Hardy Campbell, Jr.
- Record: 40: 25–5–5
- Earnings: $65,108

Major wins
- Champagne Stakes (1895); Nursery Stakes (1895); Suburban Handicap (1897); Latonia Derby (1896); Brighton Handicap (1897); First Special Stakes (1897); Second Special Stakes (1897) American Classics wins: Kentucky Derby (1896)

Awards
- American Co-Champion Two-Year-Old Colt (1895); American Champion Older Male Horse (1897); Leading sire in North America (1909)

Honors
- United States Racing Hall of Fame (1955)

Ben Brush (1893–1918) was a champion American Thoroughbred racehorse who won the 1896 Kentucky Derby.

== Background ==
Ben Brush was a bay stallion sired by Bramble (the 1879 champion handicap horse) out of Roseville (a sister to Azra, the 1892 Kentucky Derby and Travers Stakes winner) by Reform. Walter Vosburgh (after whom the Vosburgh Stakes was named) spoke highly of Bramble, saying he was "a breed as tough as pine nuts."

Ben Brush's dam, Roseville, was purchased by Ezekiel Clay & Catesby Woodford breeding partnership in 1891 from the horseman H. Eugene Leigh. At the time, she was in foal to Leigh's La Belle Stud stallion Bramble, a son of Bonnie Scotland who was the leading sire in North America in 1880 and 1882. When the resulting thoroughbred colt was offered for sale by Clay and Woodford, Leigh and his new partner, the African-American Hall of Famer Ed Brown, bought him for $1,200.

Ben Brush was bred in Kentucky and foaled at Clay's Runnymede Farm. Leigh and Brown were reportedly offered $5,000 for the yearling colt soon after they purchased him. Leigh was eager to take the deal, but Brown insisted they keep the colt for the early part of his career. Leigh accepted, and the colt remained with his new owners.

Brown named the colt Ben Brush in honor of the superintendent of the old Gravesend Race Track at Sheepshead Bay in Gravesend on Coney Island, New York, who provided them with valuable stall space. The original Ben Brush was a strict disciplinarian, although Leigh and Brown found him very lenient. When others complained of his double standards, Brush said, "Not a damn one of you fellows ever named a horse Ben Brush!"

Joe Palmer said of Ben Brush in his "Names in Pedigrees" that he was "not a particularly impressive-looking animal." The colt was a "rather small horse, a bit longer for his height than Bramble, almost equally coarse about the head."

== Racing career ==
=== 1895: Two-year-old season ===
Under his trainer Brown, Ben Brush began racing in Louisville. He won his first race at two by five lengths. In his second start, he came home by three lengths. His third effort saw him gallop home ahead of Nimrod. Ben Brush then went to Ohio, winning the Emerald Stakes and the Diamond Stakes.

After five wins in five starts, he went to New York, where he came third at Sheepshead Bay but then won an overnight handicap, giving 19 pounds to his nearest rival. He then lost to the high-class Requital in the Flatbush Stakes. He ran out of energy for the first time in the Great Eastern Handicap but then won the Holly Handicap.

Ben Brush was then sold to the famous gambler Mike Dwyer, who had, with his brother Philip, raced his sire Bramble as well as the champions Hindoo, Hanover, Miss Woodford, and Luke Blackburn. Ben Brush was the last champion to carry Mike Dwyer's colours. The reported sale was $18,000. (A race for three-year-olds, the Dwyer Stakes, held at Belmont Park since 1918, was named in their honour.)

Now ridden by Hall of Famer Willie Simms, an African-American considered one of the greatest riders of his day, and trained by Hardy Campbell Jr., Ben Brush won six more races as a two-year-old. He earned $21,398 with 13 wins in 16 starts. He was selected as Co-Champion Two-Year-Old Colt with Requital. At this point, Walter Vosburgh said Ben Brush "could have beaten any three-year-old of that season."

(Willie Simms also rode in England, where he was the first to introduce the short-stirrup style. After his stint in Europe, he was retained by Dwyer as his stable rider, but Simms's stature was such that he had the freedom to accept mounts from other stables as well. The nation's leading rider of 1893–94, he remains the only African-American jockey to win the Derby, Preakness, and Belmont).

=== 1896: Three-year-old season ===
Ben Brush's first race in the 1896 season was the 22nd Kentucky Derby on May 6. The 1896 race was the first to be run at its current, shorter distance of 1¼ miles (at its inception in 1875, the Derby had been staged over 1½ miles, the length of the original Derby at Epsom Downs in England). The race was also the first time a blanket of red roses was draped over the winner's shoulders. The tradition and why the Kentucky Derby is often called "The Run for the Roses" have remained.

Without the benefit of a prep race and having never run farther than seven furlongs in his career, Ben Brush stumbled away from the barrier, nearly unseating Simms. By the time they recovered, the race seemed over. However, Ben Brush made a tremendous move on the backstretch, caught First Mate on the turn for home, and battled fiercely with Ben Elder down the stretch before winning by a nose.

The correspondent for the "Spirit of the Times" wrote, "Simms made one last and desperate rally with Ben Brush, displaying as vigorous a piece of riding as was ever seen, and gradually but surely gaining on the other Ben, he finally beat him out by a nose in a terrific and hair-raising finish, which elicited a wild and spontaneous shout from the grandstand." When Simms saw how deeply his spurs had cut his mount and that his sides were covered in blood, he cried with shame. (Col. Clark, the guiding force behind the development of Churchill and then serving as the track's presiding judge, credited Simms with the victory. "It was a great race—one of the greatest I ever saw," Clark said. "There was no doubt in the world about the finish. Simms simply lifted Brush a foot or so in front at the last jump.")

Ben Brush finished the season with four wins and almost $27,000 in earnings.

=== 1897: Four-year-old season ===
In the view of many, as Palmer put it, Ben Brush's 1897 campaign "perhaps put the stamp of greatness on him more unmistakably than did his performances at two and three." During this last racing season, Ben Brush met Ornament, the American Champion Three-Year-Old Colt and 1897's American Horse of the Year, giving him nine pounds and winning by three lengths. He beat the 1895 Preakness Stakes and Belmont winner Belmar; 1896 Belmont winner Hastings, the grandsire of Man o' War; 1897 Champion Three-Year-Old Ornament, the winner of 20 of 33 lifetime starts; and the high-class Clifford, who twice defeated Henry of Navarre and Domino in 1894–95.

=== Overall racing record ===
Overall, Ben Brush raced 40 times. He won 25 of those races, placed in five, and showed in five, earning prize money of $65,208.

== Stud career ==
Ben Brush was a success at stud, so much so that he became one of the building blocks of the American Thoroughbred. Although his direct male line no longer exists, he continues to influence the breed. Ben Brush appears in the pedigrees of 48 of the last 50 Derby winners, including every Derby winner from 1972 onwards.

As the leading sire of 1909, Ben Brush produced Delhi, the 1904 Belmont Stakes winner and Champion Three Year Old Colt; Pebbles, the Juvenile Champion of 1914; and Broomstick, who won the 1904 Travers Stakes, and set a new American record for a mile and a quarter in the Brighton Handicap, before leading the sire's list from 1913 until 1915 (including siring Regret, the first filly to win the Kentucky Derby). He was ranked 71st in the top 100 U.S. Thoroughbred champions of the 20th Century by Blood-Horse magazine. And Ben Brush produced twice leading sire Sweep, winner of the 1910 Belmont Stakes, and a champion at two and three years-old. His most influential daughter was Belgravia, who produced Black Toney, sire of Black Gold.

Ben Brush died in Versailles, Kentucky on June 8, 1918, at the age of 25. His headstone erroneously reads 1917.

Ben Brush was part of the inaugural class inducted into the National Museum of Racing and Hall of Fame in 1955.

== Sire line tree ==
- Ben Brush
  - Broomstick
    - Whisk Broom
      - John P. Grier
        - Boojum
        - Jack High
        - El Chico
      - Upset
        - Misstep
        - Windy City
      - Whiskaway
      - Whiskery
      - Diavolo
        - Teufel
      - Victorian
        - He Did
        - Cant Wait
      - Halcyon
    - Meridian
      - Carmandale
      - Glen Wild
    - Sweeper
      - Golden Broom
      - Osmand
    - Holiday
    - Thunderer
    - Cudgel
      - Milkman
        - Pasteurized
      - Froth Blower
    - Tippity Witchet
    - Dr Clark
    - Wildair
      - Canter
        - Swashbuckler
      - Sir Harry
    - Broomspun
    - Runantell
    - Moonraker
      - Aloha Moon
        - Jesters Moon
    - Spot Cash
    - Transmute
      - Museum
    - Blondin
    - Bostonian
      - Maedic
    - Cantankerous
    - Brooms
    - Halcyon
  - Delhi
    - Outram
    - Dominant
  - Von Tromp
  - Theo Cook
  - Sweep
    - The Porter
      - Time Maker
        - Time Supply
      - Toro
      - Rosemont
        - Isasmoothie
        - Thinking Cap
      - Aneroid
      - Porters Mite
      - Porters Cap
    - Eternal
      - Nocturnal
      - Ariel
        - Airflame
        - Chicuelo
        - High Breeze
        - Ariel Lad
        - Swiv
        - Education
      - Infinity
      - Trinchera
      - Okapi
      - Xalapa Crown
      - Aletern
    - Bon Homme
    - Leonardo
    - General Thatcher
    - Mantagna
  - Vandergrift
  - Pebbles

== Pedigree ==
Pedigree of Ben Brush, bay horse, 1893
Sire Bramble (USA)	Bonnie Scotland	Iago*	Don John*
Sire Bramble (USA)	Bonnie Scotland	Iago*	Scandal*
Sire Bramble (USA)	Bonnie Scotland	Queen Mary	Gladiator
Sire Bramble (USA)	Bonnie Scotland	Queen Mary	Plenipotentiary mare
Sire Bramble (USA)	Ivy Leaf	Australian	West Australian
Sire Bramble (USA)	Ivy Leaf	Australian	Emilia
Sire Bramble (USA)	Ivy Leaf	Bay Flower	Lexington*
Sire Bramble (USA)	Ivy Leaf	Bay Flower	Bay Leaf
Dam Roseville (USA)	Reform	Leamington	Faugh-a-Ballagh
Dam Roseville (USA)	Reform	Leamington	Pantaloon mare
Dam Roseville (USA)	Reform	Stolen Kisses	Knight of Kars
Dam Roseville (USA)	Reform	Stolen Kisses	Defamation*
Dam Roseville (USA)	Albia	Alarm	Eclipse
Dam Roseville (USA)	Albia	Alarm	Maud
Dam Roseville (USA)	Albia	Elastic	Kentucky*
Dam Roseville (USA)	Albia	Elastic	Blue Ribbon (family: A1)

* Ben Brush is inbred 3S x 5D to the stallion Iago, meaning that he appears third generation on the sire side of his pedigree, and fifth generation (via Defamation) on the dam side of his pedigree.

* Ben Brush is inbred 4S x 5D to the stallion Lexington, meaning that he appears fourth generation on the sire side of his pedigree, and fifth generation (via Kentucky) on the dam side of his pedigree.
