= Whiskery =

American-bred Thoroughbred racehorse

- Sire: Whisk Broom II
- Grandsire: Broomstick
- Dam: Prudery
- Damsire: Peter Pan
- Sex: Stallion, eventually Gelding
- Foaled: 1924
- Country: United States
- Colour: Bay
- Breeder: Harry Payne Whitney
- Owner: Harry Payne Whitney
- Trainer: Fred Hopkins
- Record: 70: 14-16-32
- Earnings: $122,211

Major wins
- Ardsley Handicap (1926); Huron Handicap (1927); Stanley Produce Stakes (1927); Twin City Handicap (1927); Chesapeake Stakes (1927) American Classics wins: Kentucky Derby (1927)

Awards
- American Champion 3-Year-Old Male Horse (1927)
- Last updated on 4/15/2016

Whiskery (foaled 1924 - died 1937) was an American Thoroughbred racehorse. He was the winner of the 1927 Kentucky Derby after defeating Osmand by a nose in the stretch. Whiskery won the Ardsley Handicap at age two and the Chesapeake Stakes at age three. He was third in the 1927 Preakness Stakes and would be named American Champion Three-Year-Old Male Horse that year.

Whiskery was sold in 1927 to the Stone-Hancock-Woodward partnership for $60,000 for use as a stud horse. However, he proved to be sterile and was put back into training as a gelding. Whiskery did not achieve his previous racing success and was finally shipped in 1931 to the Charles Stone's Morven Stud in Charlottesville, Virginia for use as a saddle horse.

Whiskery's time of death was not officially reported to The Jockey Club, but it is assumed that he died around 1936 as the result of a catastrophic leg injury, either sustained by colliding with a tree while fulfilling his duty as the night watchman's horse or as a result of a track injury.
