= Broomstick (horse) =

American-bred Thoroughbred racehorse

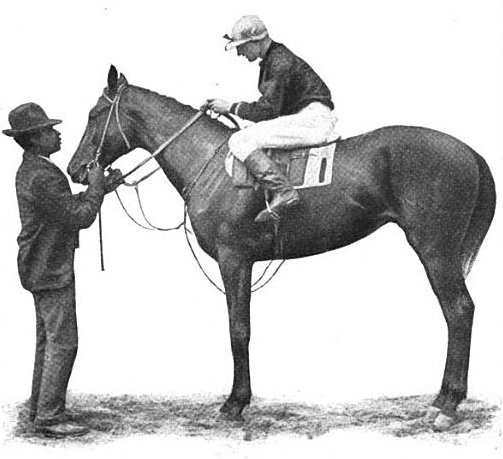
- Broomstick with jockey George M. Odom up.
- Sire: Ben Brush
- Grandsire: Bramble
- Dam: Elf
- Damsire: Galliard
- Sex: Stallion
- Foaled: 1901
- Country: United States
- Colour: Bay
- Breeder: Col. Milton Young (McGrathiana Stud)
- Owner: Samuel S. Brown; Harry Payne Whitney
- Trainer: Peter Wimmer; Robert Tucker (at age 3)
- Record: 39 Starts: 14-11-5
- Earnings: $74,730

Major wins
- Great American Stakes (1903); Juvenile Stakes (1903); Expectation Stakes (1903); Travers Stakes (1904); Brighton Handicap (1904); Flying Handicap (1904)

Awards
- Leading sire in North America (1913, 1914, 1915); Leading broodmare sire in North America (1932, 1933)

Honours
- U.S. Racing Hall of Fame (1956)

Broomstick (1901–1931) was a Thoroughbred race horse whose most important win was in the 1904 Travers Stakes. Broomstick then became one of the great sires in American racing history, leading the North American sire list in 1913, 1914 and 1915. He was inducted into the National Museum of Racing and Hall of Fame in 1956.

== Background ==
The important horseman, James R. Keene (who owned Domino, Kingston, Colin and Sysonby among so many other memorable horses), also owned Elf, Broomstick's dam. He bred her to leading sire Ben Brush, but believing she was barren, he sold her to Milton Young. One year later she foaled Broomstick at the famous McGrathiana Stud in Kentucky. As a yearling Broomstick then went to a Pittsburgh, Pennsylvania, coal millionaire named Captain Samuel S. Brown who was a member of The Jockey Club and the owner of two racetracks.

== Racing career ==
Broomstick was small, but he won his first three stakes at two for trainer Peter Wimmer. Because of this, he was weighted down rather heavily for such a young horse and consequently won fewer races at that age. He placed in the Saratoga Special, the Walden Stakes, the Flatbush Stakes, the Great Trial Stakes and the Spring Stakes.

At three, and under new trainer Robert Tucker, he won the Travers Stakes at Saratoga and the Flying Handicap at Sheepshead Bay. In winning the Brighton Handicap he beat older horses and set a track record that stood for nine years. In that race he was up against the truly game Irish Lad who broke down nearing the wire, but finished on three legs, only barely beaten.

Still heavily weighted, he placed in the Merchants and Citizens Handicap, the Hindoo Handicap, and his second Saratoga Special.

At four his only important effort was a place in the Century Handicap.

== At stud ==
Broomstick was retired to stud duty at Capt. Brown's Senorita Stock Farm near Lexington, Kentucky, where he sired three crops including 1911 Kentucky Derby winner Meridian, Sweeper II who raced in England and in 1912 won the Classic 2,000 Guineas Stakes, and the 1913 American Horse of the Year Whisk Broom II who went on to sire Whiskery, the winner of the 1927 Kentucky Derby. Capt. Brown died in late 1905 and his brother, W. Harry Brown, continued on with the business until November 23, 1908, when he sold Broomstick and twenty-eight other horses at a Fasig-Tipton auction.

Purchased by Harry Payne Whitney, Broomstick was sent to stand at Brookdale Farm in Lincroft, New Jersey. He averaged eleven foals per crop, approximately 25 percent of which were stakes winners. His offspring included Regret, the first filly to win the Kentucky Derby, in 1915, as well as Cudgel and Tippy Witchet. Tippy Witchet raced 266 times over thirteen seasons, winning 78 races, finishing second 52 times, and third 42 times.

Broomstick was America's leading sire from 1913 to 1915 and among the top ten for 17 years: 1910 to 1927. From 280 named foals, he sired 207 winners, of which 67 were stakes winners. He was also an important broodmare sire, leading the North American list in 1932 and 1933.

Broomstick died on March 24, 1931, at age 30 and was buried at the C.V. Whitney Farm in Lexington, Kentucky. In 1956 he was inducted into the U.S. Racing Hall of Fame.

== Sire line tree ==
- Broomstick
  - Whisk Broom
    - John P. Grier
      - Boojum
        - Snark
        - Burg-El-Arab
      - Jack High
        - Knave High
        - Lucky Draw
      - El Chico
    - Upset
      - Misstep
      - Windy City
    - Whiskaway
    - Whiskery
    - Diavolo
      - Teufel
    - Victorian
      - He Did
      - Cant Wait
    - Halcyon
  - Meridian
    - Carmandale
    - Glen Wild
  - Sweeper
    - Golden Broom
    - Osmand
  - Holiday
  - Thunderer
  - Cudgel
    - Milkman
      - Pasteurized
        - Bordeaux
        - Marchized
        - Woodchuck
    - Froth Blower
  - Tippity Witchet
  - Dr Clark
  - Wildair
    - Canter
      - Swashbuckler
        - Third Army
    - Sir Harry
  - Broomspun
  - Runantell
  - Moonraker
    - Aloha Moon
      - Jesters Moon
  - Spot Cash
  - Transmute
    - Museum
  - Blondin
  - Bostonian
    - Maedic
  - Cantankerous
  - Brooms
  - Halcyon

== Pedigree ==
Pedigree of Broomstick, bay stallion, 1901
Sire Ben Brush	Bramble	Bonnie Scotland	Iago
Sire Ben Brush	Bramble	Bonnie Scotland	Queen Mary
Sire Ben Brush	Bramble	Ivy Leaf	Australian
Sire Ben Brush	Bramble	Ivy Leaf	Bay Flower
Sire Ben Brush	Roseville	Reform	Leamington
Sire Ben Brush	Roseville	Reform	Stolen Kisses
Sire Ben Brush	Roseville	Albia	Alarm
Sire Ben Brush	Roseville	Albia	Elastic
Dam Elf	Galliard	Galopin	Vedette
Dam Elf	Galliard	Galopin	Flying Dutchess
Dam Elf	Galliard	Mavis	Macaroni
Dam Elf	Galliard	Mavis	Merlette
Dam Elf	Sylvabelle	Bend Or	Doncaster
Dam Elf	Sylvabelle	Bend Or	Rouge Rose
Dam Elf	Sylvabelle	Saint Editha	Kingley Vale
Dam Elf	Sylvabelle	Saint Editha	Lady Alice (family: 16)
