= Harry Payne Whitney =

American businessman and horse breeder

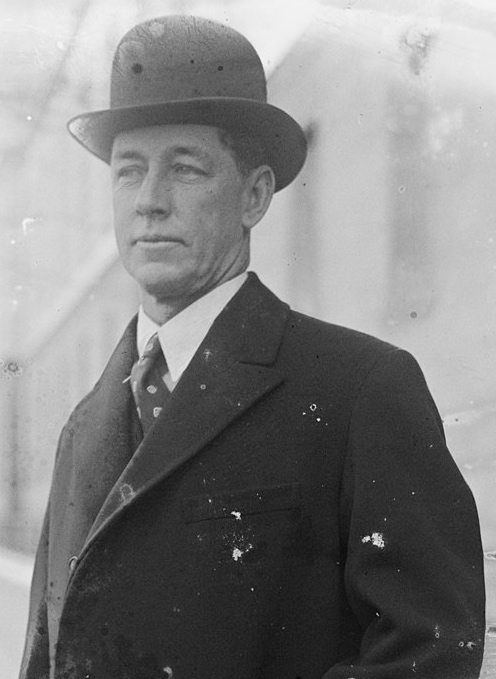
- Whitney in February 1924
- Born: April 29, 1872; New York City, U.S.
- Died: October 26, 1930 (aged 58); Portland, Maine, U.S.
- Resting place: Woodlawn Cemetery, The Bronx, New York
- Education: Groton School
- Alma mater: Yale University; Columbia Law School
- Occupations: Businessman, racehorse owner/breeder, philanthropist
- Political party: Democratic
- Board member of: Long Island Motor Parkway; Hudbay
- Spouse: Gertrude Vanderbilt (m. 1896)
- Children: Flora, Cornelius, and Barbara
- Parent(s): William Collins Whitney; Flora Payne
- Family: Whitney
- Honors: Pillars of the Turf (2018); U.S. Polo Hall of Fame (1990)

Harry Payne Whitney (April 29, 1872 – October 26, 1930) was an American businessman, thoroughbred horse breeder, and member of the prominent Whitney family.

== Early years ==
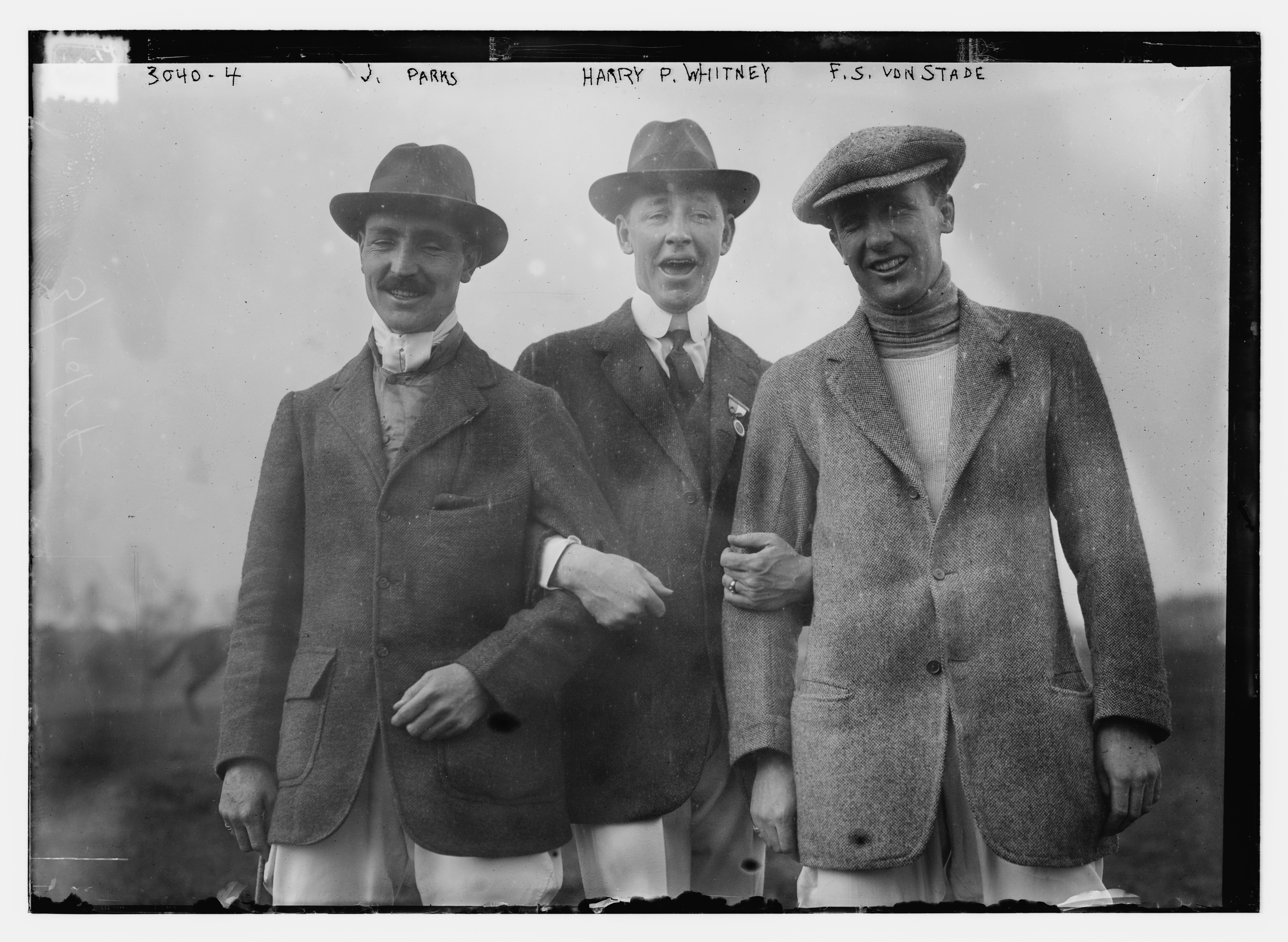
J. Parks, Harry Payne Whitney, and F.S. von Stade, circa 1914

Whitney was born in New York City on April 29, 1872, as the eldest son of Flora Payne and William C. Whitney (1841–1904), a very wealthy businessman and United States Secretary of the Navy. Whitney was the elder brother of William Payne Whitney (1876–1927). His sister Pauline Payne Whitney (1874–1916) married Almeric Hugh Paget, 1st Baron Queenborough (1861–1949), and his youngest sister Dorothy Payne Whitney (1887–1968) was married to Willard Dickerman Straight (1880–1918), and later to Leonard Knight Elmhirst (1893–1974) after Straight's death.

Whitney studied at Groton School in Groton, Massachusetts, then attended Yale University, graduating in 1894. He was a member of the Skull and Bones. After Yale, he spent two years at Columbia Law School, but he never finished his degree and decided to enter the world of sports and business. He was a member of the class of 1898. In 1904, after the death of his father, he inherited $24,000,000, and in 1917, he inherited approximately $12,000,000 along with the large steam yacht Aphrodite from his uncle, Oliver Hazard Payne.

== Sporting career ==
An avid sportsman, Whitney was a ten-goal polo player. His love of the sport was inherited from his father, who had been involved with polo when it was first organized in the United States in 1876 by James Gordon Bennett, Jr. Whitney organized the U.S. polo team that beat England in 1909. "Whitney Field" polo field near Saratoga Springs, New York, is named for him.

He was a board member of the Montauk Yacht Club and competed with his yacht Vanitie in the America's Cup. Whitney also served on the board of directors of the Long Island Motor Parkway, built by his wife's cousin, William Kissam Vanderbilt II.

Whitney enjoyed quail hunting and purchased the 14,000-acre (57 km^{2}) Foshalee Plantation in northern Leon County, Florida, from Sydney E. Hutchinson of Philadelphia, Pennsylvania.

=== Thoroughbred horse racing ===
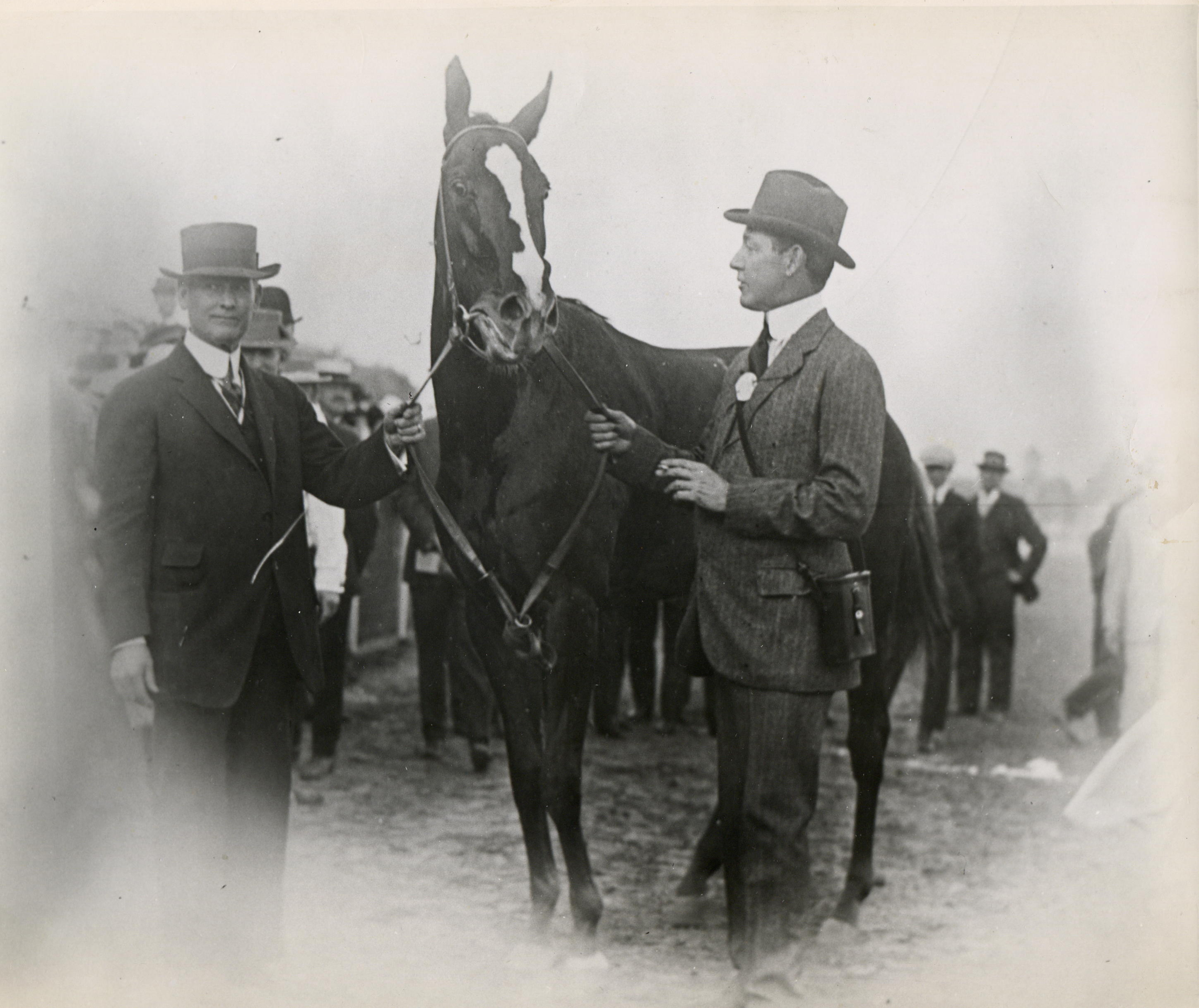
Whitney and his horse Regret

Whitney was a major figure in Thoroughbred racing and in 2018 was voted one of the National Museum of Racing and Hall of Fame's most prestigious honors as one of the Pillars of the Turf.

Harry Whitney inherited a large stable from his father including the great filly Artful and her sire Hamburg, and in 1915 established a horse breeding farm in Lexington, Kentucky where he developed the American polo pony by breeding American Quarter Horse stallions with his thoroughbred mares. He was thoroughbred racing's leading owner of the year in the United States on eight occasions and the breeder of almost two hundred stakes race winners. His leading sire was first Hamburg and then the great sire Broomstick, by Ben Brush. His Kentucky-bred horse Whisk Broom II (sired by Broomstick) raced in England, then at age six came back to the U.S. where he won the New York Handicap Triple. He also owned Upset, who gave Man o' War the only loss of his career.

Whitney had nineteen horses who ran in the Kentucky Derby, winning it the first time in 1915 with another Broomstick foal, Regret, the first filly ever to capture the race. Regret went on to earn Horse of the Year honors and was named to the National Museum of Racing and Hall of Fame. Whitney won the Kentucky Derby for the second time in 1927 with the colt Whiskery. His record of six wins in the Preakness Stakes stood as the most by any breeder until 1968 when Calumet Farm broke the record. Whitney's colt Burgomaster won the 1906 Belmont Stakes and also received Horse of the Year honors. Among the many horses, Whitney's breeding operation produced Equipoise and Johren.

Whitney's stable won the following prestigious U.S. Triple Crown races:

- Kentucky Derby:
  - 1915 : Regret (filly; voted Horse of the Year)
  - 1927 : Whiskery
- Preakness Stakes:
  - 1908 : Royal Tourist
  - 1913 : Buskin
  - 1914 : Holiday
  - 1921 : Broomspun
  - 1927 : Bostonian
  - 1928 : Victorian
- Belmont Stakes:
  - 1905 : Tanya (filly)
  - 1906 : Burgomaster (voted Horse of the Year)
  - 1913 : Prince Eugene
  - 1918 : Johren

His Lexington, Kentucky stud farm was passed on to his son, C.V. Whitney, who owned it until 1989 when it became part of Gainesway Farm.

== Personal life ==
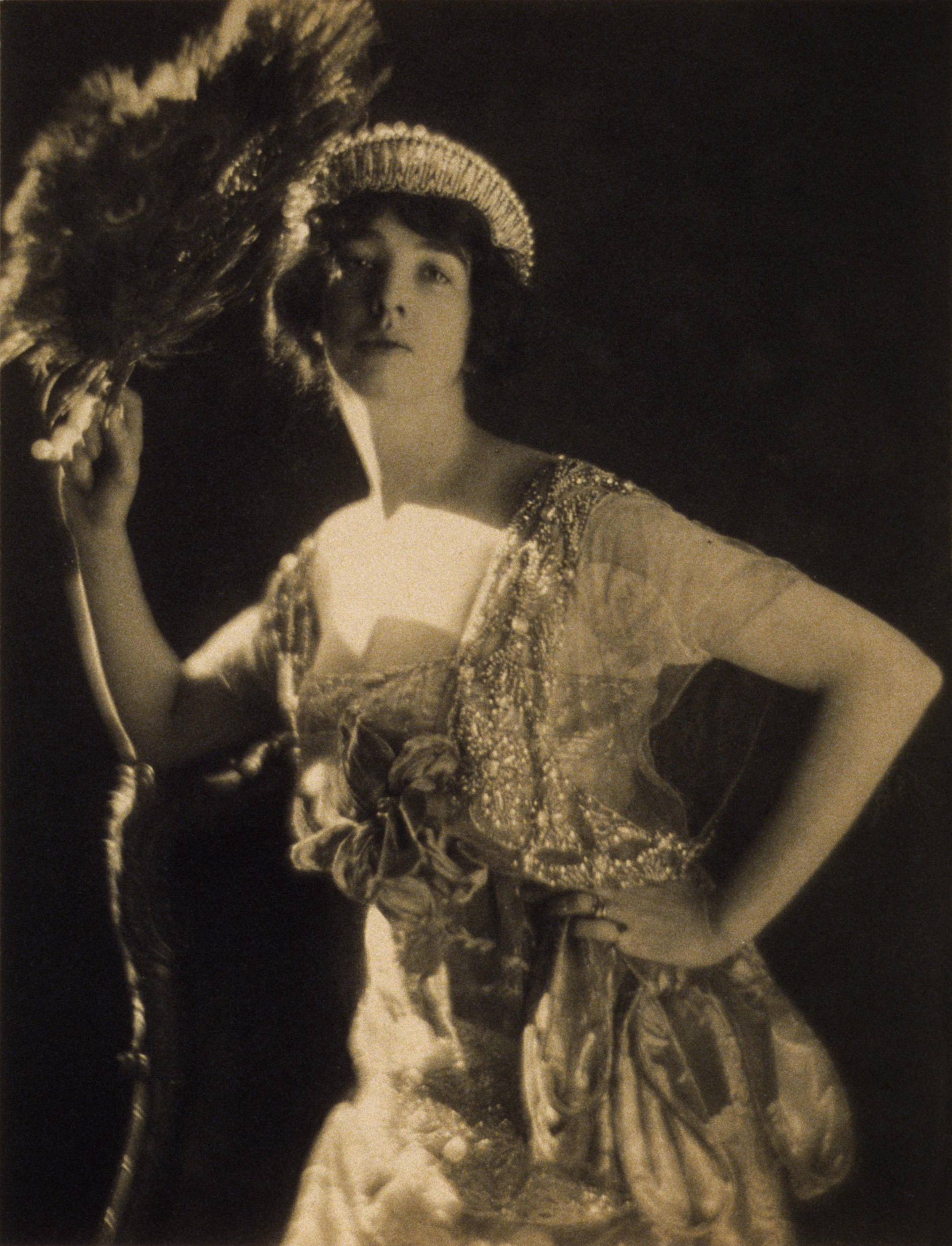
Gertrude Vanderbilt Whitney, in Vogue magazine, by Adolf de Meyer, January 15, 1917

On August 25, 1896, he married Gertrude Vanderbilt (1875–1942), a member of the wealthy Vanderbilt family. In New York, the couple lived in town houses originally belonging to William Whitney, first at 2 East 57th St., across the street from Gertrude's parents, and after William Whitney's death, at 871 Fifth Avenue. They also had a country estate in Westbury, Long Island. Together, they had three children:

- Flora Payne Whitney (1897–1986)
- Cornelius Vanderbilt Whitney (1899–1992)
- Barbara Vanderbilt Whitney (1903–1982).

Harry Whitney died in 1930 at age fifty-eight. He and his wife are interred in the Woodlawn Cemetery, The Bronx.

Whitney owned numerous incarnations of his father's Pullman Wanderer rail car.

=== Philanthropy ===
The benefactor to many organizations, in 1920 H.P. Whitney financed the Whitney South Seas Expedition of the American Museum of Natural History, Rollo Beck's major zoological expedition that sent teams of scientists and naturalists to undertake botanical research and to study the bird population of several thousand islands in the Pacific Ocean.

The Whitney Collection of Sporting Art was donated in his memory to the Yale University Art Gallery.

Whitney also subsidized the moderate-socialist Metropolitan magazine.

=== Estate ===
Following Whitney's death, his estate in New York State was valued at $72,740,000 gross and $62,808,829 net in an appraisal completed by the New York State Tax Commission in 1934. An earlier appraisal filed in the New York County Surrogate's Court in December 1931 had valued the estate at $71,771,303. Debts, taxes and expenses associated with the estate amounted to approximately $21,728,000, including $5,027,000 in debts, $454,000 in administration expenses, $400,000 in legal fees, $4,050,000 in executors' fees, $9,513,000 in New York State inheritance tax and $2,283,000 in federal estate tax.

Under the terms of his will his widow Gertrude Vanderbilt Whitney received his real estate in Nassau County valued at $1,534,000, together with personal property valued at $844,000. She was also granted a life interest, valued at $1,650,000, in their Manhattan home at 871 Fifth Avenue. Following her death, the house was to be demolished and the property sold, with the proceeds to be treated part of his residuary estate. Whitney also bequeathed outright sums of $2,000,000 to his son Cornelius Vanderbilt Whitney, $1,000,000 each to his daughters Flora Whitney Miller and Barbara Whitney Henry, and $500,000 each to his sons-in-law George Macculloch Miller III and Barklie McKee Henry. A further $265,000 worth of outright bequests was made for the benefit of various employees and business associates.

The residue of the estate (valued at approximately $42,000,000) was divided into four equal shares, three of which were placed in trust for the benefit of his children. Cornelius, Flora and Barbara were each entitled to the income from one of these trusts during their lifetimes, with provision for their respective descendants following their deaths. The remaining quarter was to be held in trust for Cornelius until his 35th birthday, when he would become entitled to receive the capital and accumulated income outright.
