= Excelsior Stakes =

- Class: Listed
- Location: Aqueduct Racetrack; Queens, New York, United States
- Inaugurated: 1903
- Race type: Thoroughbred – Flat racing

Race information
- Distance: 1 1/8 miles
- Surface: Dirt
- Track: left-handed
- Qualification: Three-years-old & up
- Weight: Assigned
- Purse: US$150,000 (2018)

The Excelsior Stakes is an American Thoroughbred horse race held annually during the first week of April at Aqueduct Racetrack in Ozone Park, Queens, New York. A Listed event for three-year-olds and up, it is contested over a distance of one-and-one-eighth miles 9 furlong.

"Excelsior" is Latin for "Upward, ever upward", and is the motto of the state of New York.

In 1928, when Hall of Famer Grey Lag was ten years old, he came in third. He'd won this race as a five-year-old in 1923.

The race was run at the old Jamaica Race Course from 1903 to 1910, and then again from 1915 to 1959. In 1913, it was run at Belmont Park. It wasn't run at all in 1909, 1911, 1912, 1914, 1933, 1967, and 2020.

Since inception, the race has been contested at various distances and as initially a handicap as the race was known as the Excelsior Handicap:

- 1 1/16 miles: 1903–1960
- 1 mile: 1960
- 1 mile, 1 furlong: 1961–1978
- 1 1/8 miles: 1994–2014, 2018-2019, 2021
- 1 1/4 miles: 1979–1993, 2015–2017

The event was downgraded from Grade III to Listed in 2022.

== Records ==
Speed record: (at distance of 1 1/8 miles)

- 1:48.10 – Classic Endeavor (2003)
- 1:48.10 – Magna Graduate (2007)

Most wins:

- 2 – King Saxon (1935, 1936)
- 2 – Find (1954, 1956)
- 2 – Lac Ouimet (1987, 1988)

Most wins by a trainer:

- 3 –Todd A. Pletcher (2006, 2007, 2019)
- 3 –William C. Winfrey (1953, 1954, 1956)

Most wins by a jockey:

- 3 – Eric Guerin (1953, 1954, 1956)
- 3 – Ángel Cordero Jr. (1972, 1975, 1976)
- 3 – Bobby Ussery (1958, 1962, 1966)
- 3 – Chuck C. Lopez (1997, 2003, 2008)

Most wins by an owner:

- 3 – Rancocas Stable (1923, 1929, 1931)
- 3 – Alfred G. Vanderbilt II (1953, 1954, 1956)
- 3 – Sigmund & Viola Sommer (1972, 1977, 1980)

== Winners ==
Year	Winner	Age	Jockey	Trainer	Owner	Dist. (Miles)	Time	Win$	Gr.
2025	Phileas Fogg	5	Kendrick Carmouche	Gustavo Rodriguez	Jupiter Stable LLC	11/4 m	2:01.69	$82,000	Listed
2024	Laughing Boy	6	Samy Camacho Jr.	David Jacobson	Lawrence P. Roman & David Jacobson	11/8 m	1:49.91	$82,500	Listed
2023	Law Professor	5	Manuel Franco	Rob Atras	Twin Creeks Racing Stables	11/8 m	1:50.34	$82,500	Listed
2022	Forewarned	7	Dexter Haddock	Uriah St. Lewis	Uriah St. Lewis	11/8 m	1:50.76	$82,500	Listed
2021	Modernist	4	Junior Alvarado	William I. Mott	Pam Wygod and Martin Wygod	11/8 m	1:54.38	$82,500	G3
2019	Life's a Parlay	4	John R. Velazquez	Todd A. Pletcher	Repole Stable & St. Elias Stable	11/8 m	1:51.54	$82,500	G3
2018	Discreet Lover	5	Manuel Franco	Uriah St. Lewis	Uriah St. Lewis	11/8 m	1:50.45	$90,000	G3
2017	Send it in	5	John R. Velazquez	Todd A. Pletcher	Paul P. Pompa Jr.	11/4 m	2:02.07	$90,000	G3
2016	Kid Cruz	5	José Ortiz	Linda L. Rice	Viña del Mar TBs & Black Swan Stable	11/4 m	2:04.52	$120,000	G3
2015	Effinex	4	Angel S. Arroyo	James A. Jerkens	Tri-Bone Stables (Bernice Cohen)	11/4 m	2:02.16	$120,000	G3
2014	Romansh	4	José Ortiz	Thomas Albertrani	Godolphin Racing	11/8 m	1:49.07	$90,000	G3
2013	Last Gunfighter	4	Rajiv Maragh	Chad Brown	John D. Gunther	11/8 m	1:50.78	$90,000	G3
2012	Marilyn's Guy	6	Chuck C. Lopez	Tony Dutrow	Michael Dubb, Bethlehem Stables, Gary Aisquith	11/8 m	1:52.54	$90,000	G3
2011	Inherit the Gold	5	Eddie Castro	James Hooper	Glas-Tipp Stable (Mary Murray) & Susanne Hooper	11/8 m	1:50.34	$60,000	G3
2010	Goldsville	5	Ramon A. Dominguez	Michael E. Hushion	Marc C. Ferrell	11/8 m	1:51.43	$120,000	G3
2009	Giant Moon	4	Edgar Prado	Richard E. Schosberg	Albert Fried Jr.	11/8 m	1:50.90	$120,000	G3
2008	Temporary Saint	5	Chuck C. Lopez	Bruce N. Levine	Maggi Moss	11/8 m	1:51.13	$66,720	G3
2007	Magna Graduate	5	John R. Velazquez	Todd A. Pletcher	Elisabeth Alexander	11/8 m	1:48.10	$125,460	G3
2006	West Virginia	5	Norberto Arroyo Jr.	Todd A. Pletcher	Donald & Roberta Zuckerman	11/8 m	1:48.28	$67,140	G3
2005	Offlee Wild	5	Rafael Bejarano	Richard E. Dutrow Jr.	AZ Azalea Stables LLC	11/8 m	1:50.41	$120,000	G3
2004	Funny Cide	4	José A. Santos	Barclay Tagg	Sackatoga Stable	11/8 m	1:49.57	$120,000	G3
2003	Classic Endeavor	5	Chuck C. Lopez	Scott Schwartz	Herbert T. Schwartz & Scott Schwartz	11/8 m	1:48.10	$90,000	G3
2002	John Little	4	Norberto Arroyo Jr.	Deborah Bodner	Deborah Bodner	11/8 m	1:49.25	$120,000	G3
2001	Cat's At Home	4	Filberto Leon	Mark A. Hennig	Edward P. Evans	11/8 m	1:48.92	$120,000	G3
2000	Lager	6	Heberto Castillo Jr.	James A. Jerkens	Susan & John Moore	11/8 m	1:49.76	$120,000	G3
1999	Smart Coupons	6	René Douglas	Deborah Bodner	Louis J. Porreco	11/8 m	1:49.71	$120,000	G3
1998	Sir Bear	5	Enrique Jurado	Ralph Ziade	Barbara Smollin	11/8 m	1:49.24	$120,000	G3
1997	Ormsby	5	Chuck C. Lopez	Sue Alpers	Woodside Stud	11/8 m	1:47.69	$120,000	G2
1996	May I Inquire	5	Joe Bravo	Gasper Moschera	Barbara J. Davis	11/8 m	1:50.67	$120,000	G2
1995	Iron Gavel	5	José Martínez Jr.	Gasper Moschera	Joques Farm	11/8 m	1:49.28	$90,000	G2
1994	Colonial Affair	4	José A. Santos	Flint S. Schulhofer	Centennial Farm (Donald Little)	11/8 m	1:49.82	$90,000	G2
1993	Devil His Due	4	Mike E. Smith	H. Allen Jerkens	Lion Crest Stable (Edith Libutti)	11/4 m	2:03.05	$72,120	G2
1992	Defensive Play	5	David Flores	Robert J. Frankel	Juddmonte Farm	11/8 m	2:01.95	$102,780	G2
1991	Chief Honcho	4	Mike E. Smith	William I. Mott	Bertram R. Firestone	11/8 m	2:02.60	$102,060	G2
1990	Lay Down	6	Chris Antley	C. R. McGaughey III	Ogden Mills Phipps	11/8 m	2:02.20	$100,980	G2
1989	Forever Silver	5	Julie Krone	Stanley R. Shapoff	Chevalier Stable	11/8 m	2:02.60	$99,720	G2
1988	Lac Ouimet	5	Jerry Bailey	Richard J. Lundy	Virginia Kraft Payson	11/8 m	2:00.20	$140,880	G2
1987	Lac Ouimet	4	Eddie Maple	Richard J. Lundy	Virginia Kraft Payson	11/8 m	2:02.00	$106,380	G2
1986	Garthorn	6	Rafael Meza	Robert J. Frankel	Jerome S. Moss	11/8 m	2:02.40	$101,340	G2
1985	Morning Bob	4	Jacinto Vásquez	Nick Zito	Mike Rich Stable	11/8 m	2:04.20	$87,750	G2
1984	Canadian Factor	4	Jorge Velásquez	Melvin W. Gross	Frank Stronach	11/8 m	2:03.00	$88,650	G2
1983	Fast Gold	4	Jean-Luc Samyn	Sally A. Bailie	Aisco Stable	11/8 m	2:04.00	$67,200	G2
1982	Globe	5	Michael Venezia	Victor J. Nickerson	Nelson Bunker Hunt	11/8 m	2:03.40	$66,480	G2
1981	Irish Tower	4	Jeffrey Fell	Stanley M. Hough	Malcolm H. Winfield	11/8 m	2:00.80	$66,680	G2
1980	Ring of Light	5	Cash Asmussen	Pancho Martin	Viola Sommer	11/8 m	2:01.40	$67,560	G2
1979	Special Tiger	4	George Martens	William F. Schmitt	Albert Fried Jr.	11/4 m	2:03.80	$63,600	G2
1978	Cox's Ridge	4	Eddie Maple	Joseph B. Cantey	Loblolly Stable	11/8 m	1:50.60	$49,005	G2
1977	Turn And Count	4	Steve Cauthen	Pancho Martin	Sigmund Sommer	11/8 m	1:51.00	$48,150	G2
1976	Double Edge Sword	6	Ángel Cordero Jr.	Richard Dutrow Sr.	Aisquith Stable	11/8 m	1:48.00	$51,120	G2
1975	Step Nicely	5	Ángel Cordero Jr.	H. Allen Jerkens	Hobeau Farm	11/8 m	1:48.40	$33,990	G2
1974	Everton II	5	Marco Castaneda	Laz Barrera	Enrique Ubarri	11/8 m	1:49.00	$33,840	G2
1973	Key To The Mint	4	Ron Turcotte	J. Elliott Burch	Rokeby Stable	11/8 m	1:47.80	$32,640	G2
1972	Autobiography	4	Ángel Cordero Jr.	Pancho Martin	Sigmund Sommer	11/8 m	1:49.00	$34,860	
1971	Loud	4	Jacinto Vásquez	James W. Maloney	William Haggin Perry	11/8 m	1:50.80	$34,200	
1970	Hydrologist	4	Chuck Baltazar	Roger Laurin	Meadow Stable	11/8 m	1:48.80	$37,570	
1969	San Roque	4	Heliodoro Gustines	Sherrill W. Ward	Lazy F Ranch	11/8 m	1:49.60	$37,310	
1968	Peter Piper	5	Jorge Velásquez	Paul Healy	Joseph R. Daly	11/8 m	1:48.00	$35,945	
1966	Choker	6	Bobby Ussery	H. Allen Jerkens	Hobeau Farm	11/8 m	1:49.20	$36,010	
1965	Tenacle	5	William Mayorga	Homer C. Pardue	Joseph R. Straus	11/8 m	1:49.40	$35,750	
1964	Uppercut	5	Johnny Sellers	Willard C. Freeman	William L. Harmonay	11/8 m	1:50.00	$17,875	
1963	Greek Money	4	John L. Rotz	Virgil W. Raines	Brandywine Stable	11/8 m	1:48.60	$18,265	
1962	Hitting Away	4	Bobby Ussery	James E. Fitzsimmons	Ogden Phipps	11/8 m	1:50.00	$18,558	
1961	Mail Order	5	Larry Adams	Larry Thompson	Alamode Farm	11/8 m	1:49.20	$19,110	
1960	Talent Show	5	Ray Broussard	Clyde Troutt	Ada L. Rice	1 m	1:34.80	$18,745	
1959	Whitley	4	Sam Boulmetis Sr.	Max Hirsch	W. Arnold Hanger	11/16 m	1:43.80	$18,485	
1958	Kingmaker	5	Bobby Ussery	Frank I. Wright	Happy Hill Farm	11/16 m	1:43.60	$18,615	
1957	Midafternoon	5	Eddie Arcaro	Thomas M. Waller	Mrs. Edward E. Robbins	11/16 m	1:43.60	$19,750	
1956	Find	6	Eric Guerin	William C. Winfrey	Alfred G. Vanderbilt II	11/16 m	1:43.20	$19,800	
1955	Fisherman	4	Hedley Woodhouse	Sylvester Veitch	Cornelius V. Whitney	11/16 m	1:45.00	$20,450	
1954	Find	4	Eric Guerin	William C. Winfrey	Alfred G. Vanderbilt II	11/16 m	1:44.00	$21,250	
1953	First Glance	6	Eric Guerin	William C. Winfrey	Alfred G. Vanderbilt II	11/16 m	1:44.00	$20,500	
1952	Spartan Valor	4	James Stout	Frank Catrone	William G. Helis Jr.	11/16 m	1:44.60	$18,950	
1951	Lotowhite	4	Eddie Arcaro	Lydell T. Ruff	Thomas G. Benson	11/16 m	1:44.20	$20,750	
1950	Arise	4	Douglas Dodson	James C. Bentley	Addison Stable	11/16 m	1:43.80	$17,200	
1949	My Request	4	Claude Erickson	James P. Conway	Florence Whitaker	11/16 m	1:44.80	$16,700	
1948	Knockdown	5	Ferril Zufelt	James W. Smith	Maine Chance Farm	11/16 m	1:46.00	$20,750	
1947	Coincidence	5	Ted Atkinson	John M. Gaver Sr.	Greentree Stable	11/16 m	1:44.00	$15,900	
1946	Fighting Step	4	Johnny Adams	Charles C. Norman	Murlogg Farm (Helen W. Kellogg)	11/16 m	1:45.00	$12,750	
1945	Saguaro	4	Mike Caffarella	Woody Stephens	Jule Fink	11/16 m	1:44.60	$7,070	
1944	Alex Barth	4	Nick Jemas	James R. Hastie	Milbrook Stable	11/16 m	1:46.40	$7,375	
1943	Riverland	5	Steve Brooks	Moody Jolley	Louisiana Farm	11/16 m	1:44.40	$9,300	
1942	Waller	4	Charles Wahler	A. G. Robertson	John C. Clark	11/16 m	1:46.80	$8,775	
1941	Robert Morris	3	Nick Wall	Thomas H. McCreery	J. Frederic Byers	11/16 m	1:43.60	$8,275	
1940	The Chief	5	Irving Anderson	Earl Sande	Maxwell Howard	11/16 m	1:44.20	$6,200	
1939	Thanksgiving	4	Raymond Workman	Mary Hirsch	Anne C. Corning	11/16 m	1:44.20	$6,950	
1938	Caballero II	6	Wayne D. Wright	Hirsch Jacobs	Ethel D. Jacobs	11/16 m	1:45.40	$6,650	
1937	Thorson	5	William Ray	Thomas H. McCreery	Buckley M. Byers	11/16 m	1:43.80	$6,950	
1936	King Saxon	5	Charles Landolt	Charles H. Knebelkamp	Charles H. Knebelkamp	11/16 m	1:45.20	$5,400	
1935	King Saxon	4	Cal Rainey	Charles H. Knebelkamp	Charles H. Knebelkamp	11/16 m	1:43.60	$5,430	
1934	Watch Him	5	Earl Steffen	Willie Knapp	Fannie Hertz	11/16 m	1:46.00	$2,450	
1932	Pompeius	3	Joe Knapp	J. P. "Sammy" Smith	William R. Coe	11/16 m	1:45.20	$4,850	
1931	Mokatam	4	Willie Kelsay	Frank M. Taylor	Rancocas Stable	11/16 m	1:46.00	$5,700	
1930	Minotaur	4	Charles Kurtsinger	Charles Graffagnini	John R. Thompson Jr.	11/16 m	1:45.80	$5,950	
1929	Mowlee	4	Laverne Fator	Sam Hildreth	Rancocas Stable	11/16 m	1:45.20	$7,200	
1928	Brown Flash	4	Virgil Peterson	Jack S. Middleton	Frederick Johnson	11/16 m	1:46.40	$6,200	
1927	Amberjack	4	James McCoy	James E. Fitzsimmons	Belair Stud	11/16 m	1:44.00	$6,200	
1926	Turf Idol	4	Sidney Hebert	Jimmy Johnson	James Butler	11/16 m	1:45.60	$6,400	
1925	Sting	4	Benjamin Breuning	Jimmy Johnson	James Butler	11/16 m	1:42.60	$5,850	
1924	Rialto	4	Johnny Corcoran	James G. Rowe Sr.	Greentree Stable	11/16 m	1:46.00	$5,850	
1923	Grey Lag	5	Laverne Fator	Sam Hildreth	Rancocas Stable	11/16 m	1:45.00	$5,850	
1922	Sennings Park	6	Charles Fairbrother	A. Jack Joyner	Westmont Stable	11/16 m	1:44.80	$5,850	
1921	Blazes	4	Ted Rice	William M. Garth	Joshua S. Cosden	11/16 m	1:47.20	$8,550	
1920	Boniface	5	Earl Sande	H. Guy Bedwell	J. K. L. Ross	11/16 m	1:45.20	$4,850	
1919	Naturalist	5	Charles Fairbrother	Thomas Welsh	Joseph E. Widener	11/16 m	1:45.40	$3,850	
1918	George Smith	5	Willie Kelsay	Hollie Hughes	John Sanford	11/16 m	1:45.40	$3,850	
1917	Roamer	6	Andy Schuttinger	A. J. Goldsborough	Andrew Miller	11/16 m	1:45.40	$2,825	
1916	Sand Marsh	4	James Butwell	Richard O. Miller	Fred E. Rose	11/16 m	1:46.00	$2,425	
1915	Addie M.	4	Joe McCahey	George W. Langdon	John W. Messervy	11/16 m	1:45.80	$1,925	
1913	Meridian	5	Buddy Glass	Albert Ewing	Richard F. Carman	11/16 m	1:44.60		
1906	Merry Lark	4	Walter Miller	Thomas Welsh	Newcastle Stable	11/16 m	1:47.20	$7,350	
1905	Santa Catalina †	3	Walter Miller	R. Wyndham Walden	Albermale Stable	11/16 m	1:46.40	$6,450	
1904	Rostand	4	Herman Phillips	George Cornell	F. R. Docter	11/16 m	1:45.60	$6,600	
1903	Blackstock	4	Grover Fuller	John W. Rogers	William C. Whitney	11/16 m	1:46.60	$6,730	

- † In 1905 Preen finished first but was disqualified.
