= 1930 Belmont Stakes =

American horse race

62nd Belmont Stakes
- Belmont Stakes
- Location: Belmont Park; Elmont, New York, U.S.
- Date: June 7, 1930
- Distance: 1 1/2 mi (12 furlongs; 2,414 m)
- Winning horse: Gallant Fox
- Winning time: 2:31 3/5
- Jockey: Earl Sande
- Trainer: Jim Fitzsimmons
- Owner: Belair Stud
- Conditions: Good
- Surface: Dirt

The 1930 Belmont Stakes was the 62nd running of the Belmont Stakes. It was the 24th Belmont Stakes held at Belmont Park in Elmont, New York and was held on June 7, 1930. With a field of four horses, Gallant Fox, the winner of that year's Preakness Stakes and Kentucky Derby, clinched the U.S. Triple Crown when he won the 1 1/2–mile race (12 f; 2.4 km) by 3 lengths over the odds-on favorite – Whichone.

== Background ==
A June 3, 1930 Daily Racing Form story on the upcoming Belmont Stakes reported on the opinion of various horsemen as to whether it would be Whichone or Gallant Fox that would come out on top. The consensus was that Whichone would be the victor, the DRF stating it was important to note that for the most part the votes for the Whitney colt came from trainers and jockeys while those supporting Gallant Fox were handicappers and others who closely study horseracing. Among those jockeys and trainers who chose Whichone were future Hall of Fame inductees Laverne Fator, Mack Garner, Max Hirsch, Willie Knapp, and "Dick" Thompson.

== Results ==
Finish	PP	Horse	Jockey	Trainer	Owner	Final odds	Stakes
1	1	Gallant Fox	Earl Sande	Jim Fitzsimmons	Belair Stud	8–5	$66,040
2	3	Whichone	Raymond Workman	Thomas J. Healey	Harry Payne Whitney	7–10	$7,500
3	4	Questionnaire	Alfred Robertson	Andy Schuttinger	James Butler	10–1	$3,000
3	2	Swinfield	Louis Schaefer	Patrick F. Dwyer	Walter J. Salmon Sr.	30–1	$1,000

- Winning breeder: Belair Stud (MD)
