= Merchants and Citizens Handicap =

- Class: Discontinued stakes
- Location: Saratoga Race Course; Saratoga Springs, New York, United States
- Inaugurated: 1900–1960
- Race type: Thoroughbred – Flat racing

Race information
- Distance: 1 3/4 miles (14 furlongs)
- Surface: Dirt
- Track: left-handed
- Qualification: Three-years-old and up

The Merchants and Citizens Handicap is a discontinued American Thoroughbred horse race which was first run in 1900 at Saratoga Race Course in Saratoga Springs, New York. Open to horses aged three and older, it was contested on dirt. The inaugural event was won by Orville Richards' gelding Charentus and the final running in 1960 by Gustave Ring's Don Poggio. In between them, some of the races most notable winners include U.S. Racing Hall of Fame inductees Roamer, Sir Barton, Exterminator (1921) and Discovery (1935).

The 1919 U. S. Triple Crown winner Sir Barton set a world record of 1:55 3/5 for 1 3/16 miles on dirt in winning the August 28, 1920 edition of the Merchants and Citizens Handicap.

== Records ==
Speed record:

- 2:55.80 – Don Poggio (1960) at 13/4 miles
- 1:54.60 – Reveille Boy (1932) at 13/16

Most wins:

- 2 – Herbert (1901, 1902)
- 2 – Sir John Johnson (1909, 1910)

Most wins by a jockey:

- 6 – Ted Atkinson (1943, 1945, 1947, 1950, 1953, 1955)

Most wins by a trainer:

- 6 – James E. Fitzsimmons (1914, 1930, 1933, 1934, 1940, 1941)

Most wins by an owner:

- 4 – Belair Stud (1930, 1934, 1940, 1941)

== Winners ==
Year	Winner	Age	Jockey	Trainer	Owner	Dist. (Miles)	Time
1960	Don Poggio	4	Sam Boulmetis Sr.	Pancho Martin	Gustave Ring	13/4 M	2:55.80
1959	Cross Channel	5	Manuel Ycaza	Edward A. Christmas	Howell E. Jackson	13/4 M	2:56.00
1958	Civet	5	Raul Sterling	T. F. McMahon	Byrnalnan Stable (E. Austin Byrne)	13/4 M	2:58.80
1957	Admiral Vee	5	Willie Lester	H. Allen Jerkens	Edward Seinfeld	13/4 M	2:59.60
1956	Thinking Cap	4	Paul J. Bailey	Henry S. Clark	Christiana Stables	13/4 M	3:02.80
1955	First Aid	5	Ted Atkinson	Preston M. Burch	Brookmeade Stable	13/16 M	1:58.00
1954	Capeador	4	Nick Shuk	Preston M. Burch	Brookmeade Stable	13/16 M	1:58.00
1953	One Hitter	7	Ted Atkinson	John M. Gaver Sr.	Greentree Stable	13/16 M	1:56.60
1952	Crafty Admiral	4	Eric Guerin	Robert B. Odom	Charfran Stable (Charles & Frances Cohen)	13/16 M	1:57.40
1951	County Delight	4	Eric Guerin	James E. Ryan	Rokeby Stable	13/16 M	1:57.40
1950	My Request	5	Ted Atkinson	James P. Conway	Florence Whitaker	13/16 M	1:56.60
1949	Chains	4	Gordon Glisson	Preston M. Burch	Brookmeade Stable	13/16 M	1:57.20
1948	Beauchef	5	Ruperto Donoso	Robert B. Odom	Andes Stable	13/16 M	1:59.00
1947	Loyal Legion	3	Ted Atkinson	Oscar White	Walter M. Jeffords Sr.	13/16 M	1:58.00
1946	Lucky Draw	5	Conn McCreary	Bert Mulholland	George D. Widener Jr.	13/16 M	1:55.40
1945	Coronal	5	Ted Atkinson	George P. "Maj" Odom	Dell Stables (Herman Delman)	13/16 M	1:56.20
1944	Princequillo	4	George Woolf	Horatio Luro	Boone Hall Stable	13/16 M	1:56.20
1943	Lochinvar	4	Ted Atkinson	Andy Schuttinger	Joseph M. Roebling	13/16 M	1:55.00
1942	Olympus	7	Don Meade	Eddie Hayward	Barrington Stable	13/16 M	1:58.00
1941	Fenelon	4	James Stout	James E. Fitzsimmons	Belair Stud	13/16 M	1:58.80
1940	Isolater	7	James Stout	James E. Fitzsimmons	Belair Stud	13/16 M	1:56.80
1939	Sickle T	4	Ronnie Nash	Jack Howard	Florence Whitaker	13/16 M	1:58.40
1938	Great Union	3	Sam Renick	Louis Feustel	Elizabeth Graham Lewis	13/16 M	1:57.80
1937	Count Arthur	5	Lester Balaski	Lon Johnson	Fannie Hertz	13/16 M	1:58.00
1936	Esposa	4	Nick Wall	Matthew P. Brady	Middleburg Stable	13/16 M	2:00.40
1935	Discovery	4	John Bejshak	Joseph H. Stotler	Alfred G. Vanderbilt II	13/16 M	1:57.40
1934	Faireno	5	Tommy Malley	James E. Fitzsimmons	Belair Stud	13/16 M	1:58.60
1933	Dark Secret	4	Hank Mills	James E. Fitzsimmons	Wheatley Stable	13/16 M	1:57.40
1932	Reveille Boy	5	Raymond Workman	John A. Best	John A. Best	13/16 M	1:54.60
1931	Curate	5	Mack Garner	Peter W. Coyne	Joseph E. Widener	13/16 M	1:56.60
1930	Frisius	4	Whitey Abel	James E. Fitzsimmons	Belair Stud	13/16 M	1:56.60
1929	Petee-Wrack	4	John Maiben	William M. Booth	John R. Macomber	13/16 M	2:02.20
1928	Chance Shot	4	Earl Sande	Peter W. Coyne	Joseph E. Widener	13/16 M	2:03.20
1927	Chance Play	4	Earl Sande	John I. Smith	Arden Farm Stable	13/16 M	1:59.20
1926	Flagstaff	6	Laverne Fator	Willie Knapp	La Brae Stable (H. H. Cotton)	13/16 M	1:59.00
1925	Spot Cash	5	John Maiben	James W. Healy	Albert C. Bostwick Jr.	13/16 M	1:58.00
1924	Sunsini	4	Willie Kelsay	Frank M. Bray	Lilane Stable (Mrs. William L. Walker)	13/16 M	2:05.20
1923	Bunting	4	Clarence Kummer	James G. Rowe Sr.	Harry Payne Whitney	13/16 M	1:56.40
1922	Devastation	4	Laverne Fator	Max Hirsch	Stephen Petit	13/16 M	2:05.00
1921	Exterminator	6	Willie Kelsay	Willie Knapp	Willis Sharpe Kilmer	13/16 M	1:57.40
1920	Sir Barton	4	Earl Sande	H. Guy Bedwell	J. K. L. Ross	13/16 M	1:55.60
1919	Cudgel	5	Earl Sande	H. Guy Bedwell	J. K. L. Ross	13/16 M	1:57.40
1918	Midway	4	Harold Thurber	John S. Ward	James W. Parrish	13/16 M	1:56.20
1917	Clematis	4	Merritt C. Buxton	Thomas M. Murphy	Oscar Lewisohn	13/16 M	2:02.40
1916	The Finn	4	Andy Schuttinger	Edward W. Heffner	Harry C. Hallenbeck	13/16 M	1:58.00
1915	Roamer	4	James Butwell	Andrew J. Goldsborough	Andrew Miller	13/16 M	1:59.00
1914	Star Gaze	4	John McTaggart	James E. Fitzsimmons	Herbert L. Pratt	13/16 M	2:03.80
1913	Sam Jackson	5	Tommy Davies	Jack L. McGinnis	V. M. McGinnis	13/16 M	2:01.60
1911	– 1912	No racing due to Hart–Agnew Law					
1910	Sir John Johnson	5	George Archibald	David Woodford	Beverwyck Stable (Frank J. Nolan)	13/16 M	2:01.60
1909	Sir John Johnson	4	James Butler Jr.	David Woodford	Beverwyck Stable (Frank J. Nolan)	13/16 M	1:58.00
1908	Dandelion	6	Carroll Shilling	John E. Madden	Francis R. Hitchcock	13/16 M	1:58.80
1907	Running Water	4	Walter Miller	Thomas Welsh	Newcastle Stable	13/16 M	1:58.40
1906	Red Leaf	4	Charles Koerner	J. Oliver Keene	J. Oliver Keene	13/16 M	2:02.00
1905	Outcome	4	Harry W. Baird	Woodford Clay	Woodford Clay	13/16 M	2:02.60
1904	Molly Brant	4	George M. Odom	Hubert H. Hyner	John Sanford	11/8 M	1:51.60
1903	Hermis	4	George M. Odom	William Shields	Edward R. Thomas	11/8 M	1:51.60
1902	Herbert	5	Lewis Smith	Walter C. Rollins	Walter C. Rollins	11/8 M	1:56.40
1901	Herbert	4	Lewis Smith	Walter C. Rollins	Walter C. Rollins	11/8 M	1:51.20
1900	Charentus	6	Willie Shaw	Jim McLaughlin	Orville L. Richards	11/16 M	1:45.50
