= Havre de Grace Handicap =

- Class: Discontinued stakes
- Location: Havre de Grace Racetrack; Harford County, Maryland, United States
- Inaugurated: 1912-1949
- Race type: Thoroughbred - Flat racing

Race information
- Surface: Dirt
- Track: left-handed
- Qualification: Three-year-olds and up

The Havre de Grace Handicap was an American Thoroughbred horse race first run on the August 26, 1912 opening day of the new Havre de Grace Racetrack in Havre de Grace, Maryland. Although most of its runnings would take place in early fall, its final edition was run there on April 30, 1949. Due to Federal government wartime regulations, the 1943 edition was held at Laurel Park and in 1945 at Pimlico Race Course. A race for horses age three old or older, it was run on dirt over a distance of 1 1/8 miles with the exception of 1918 when it was set at 1 mile and 70 yards. From inception through 1939, the race was known as the Havre de Grace Cup Handicap.

== Historical notes ==
The 38 runnings of the Havre de Grace Handicap produced a number of wins by racing's top horses. The 1915 edition saw Life magazine co-founder Andrew Miller win with his future U.S. Racing Hall of Fame inductee, Roamer. The 1916 winner, The Finn, had won the 1915 Belmont Stakes and earned American Champion Three-Year-Old Male Horse honors. The next year saw the 1917 Kentucky Derby winner Omar Khayyam capture the Havre de Grace Handicap, then two years later Cudgel won. Owned by Commander J. K. L. Ross, in a very strong field Cudgel defeated two future U.S. Racing Hall of Fame inductees. The runner-up was Exterminator who was the 1918 Kentucky Derby winner, and in third place was Sir Barton, the 1919 U.S. Triple Crown champion. The 1926 race was won by another future Hall of Famer, Crusader. He beat top horses such as Display, Sarazen and Princess Doreen. Again in 1929 it was another future Hall of Famer Sun Beau who won.

The only time a mare ever won the event occurred in 1931 when Valenciennes defeated a field of eight males for owner Fannie Hertz who also owned Reigh Count, the 1928 Kentucky Derby winner and American Horse of the Year. Reigh Count would sire the great Count Fleet who would win the 1948 U.S. Triple Crown for Mrs. Hertz.

Equipoise, who too would be elected to the U.S. Racing Hall of Fame, won with his usual come-from-behind charge down the homestretch to take the 1932 race going away.

The 1938 running saw future Hall of Famer Seabiscuit put on a performance in the Havre de Grace Handicap that the New York Times described as "one of his most sensational victories." Bumped so hard at the first turn by another horse that jockey George Woolf thought he was going down, Seabiscuit regained his stride, caught up with the field, then took the lead away from the outstanding runner Menow and from there was hand-ridden to victory in a time of 1:50 flat that was just 1/5 of a second off the track record.

In 1940, Challedon would become the only horse to win the Havre de Grace Handicap twice. Ridden by George Woolf, it marked the third straight win of this race for the future Hall of Fame jockey.

Sarah F. Jeffords very fast colt Natchez added a third track record to his racing resumé with his 1948 victory in which he ran the mile and one-eighth in a clocking at 1:49 2/5.

== Records ==
Speed record:

- 1:49 2/5 @ 11/8 miles on dirt - Natchez (1948)

Most wins:

- 2 - Challedon

Most wins by a jockey:

- 3 - George Woolf (1938, 1939, 1940)

Most wins by a trainer:

- 2 - Robert A. Smith (1918, 1935)
- 2 - James E. Fitzsimmons (1921, 1934)
- 2 - James G. Rowe Sr. (1922, 1923)
- 2 - Louis J. Schaefer (1939, 1941)

Most wins by an owner:

- 3 - William L. Brann / Branncastle Farm (1939, 1940, 1941)

== Winners ==
Year	Winner	Age	Jockey	Trainer	Owner	Dist. (Miles)	Time
1949	Lord Grillo	6	Mike Basile	Charles M. Feltner	Gustave Ring	11/8	1:50.20
1948	Natchez	5	Donnie Padgett	Oscar White	Sarah F. Jeffords	11/8	1:49.40
1947	Turbine	5	Mike Basile	P. Da Lee Watts	Estate of Mrs. H. Leibowitz	11/8	1:49.60
1946	Biscailuz	5	Ruperto Donoso	J. H. Logan	J. H. Logan	11/8	1:50.00
1945	Gay Bit	4	Donnie Padgett	Albert Dunne	Bobanet Stable (R. Bruce Livie)	11/8	1:52.20
1944	Some Chance	5	John Gilbert	B. Frank Christmas	Abram S. Hewitt	11/8	1:54.40
1943	Thumbs Up	4	Otto Grohs	Carl A. Roles	Louis B. Mayer	11/8	1:52.60
1942	Tola Rose	5	Warren Mehrtens	Max Hirsch	Arthur J. Sackett	11/8	1:50.00
1941	Pictor	4	Maurice Peters	Louis J. Schaefer	William L. Brann	11/8	1:51.20
1940	Challedon	4	George Woolf	Don Cameron	Branncastle Farm (William L. Brann)	11/8	1:50.40
1939	Challedon	3	George Woolf	Louis J. Schaefer	Branncastle Farm (William L. Brann)	11/8	1:52.60
1938	Seabiscuit	5	George Woolf	Tom Smith	Charles S. Howard	11/8	1:50.00
1937	Eagle Pass	3	Basil James	John J. Flanigan	Valdina Farm Stable	11/8	1:52.00
1936	Roman Soldier	4	Eddie Arcaro	Phil Reuter	Elwood Sachsenmaier & Phil Reuter	11/8	1:51.00
1935	Good Goods	4	Eddie Arcaro	Robert A. Smith	Brookmeade Stable	11/8	1:51.40
1934	Faireno	5	Thomas Malley	James E. Fitzsimmons	Belair Stud	11/8	1:50.20
1933	Osculator	4	Don Meade	Joseph H. Stotler	William R. Coe	11/8	1:49.80
1932	Equipoise	4	Raymond Workman	Fred Hopkins	Cornelius Vanderbilt Whitney	11/8	1:50.20
1931	Valenciennes	4	Earl Steffen	William J. Knapp	Fannie Hertz	11/8	1:50.80
1930	Spinach	3	Alfred Robertson	Clyde Phillips	William Ziegler Jr.	11/8	1:51.00
1929	Sun Beau	4	Frank Coltiletti	William Irvine	Willis Sharpe Kilmer	11/8	1:55.60
1928	Osmand	4	Chick Lang	Pete Coyne	Joseph E. Widener	11/8	1:53.80
1927	Chance Play	4	Louis Morris	John I. Smith	Arden Farm	11/8	1:52.00
1926	Crusader	3	Earl Sande	George H. Conway	Glen Riddle Farm	11/8	1:50.00
1925	Senalado	3	Edgar Barnes	Thomas J. Healey	Richard T. Wilson Jr.	11/8	1:52.80
1924	Valador	4	Bennie Breuning	Tom Moran	William Martin	11/8	1:51.00
1923	Enchantment	3	Linus McAtee	James G. Rowe Sr.	Harry Payne Whitney	11/8	1:50.80
1922	Bunting	3	Frank Keogh	James G. Rowe Sr.	Harry Payne Whitney	11/8	1:53.60
1921	Captain Alcock	4	Linus McAtee	James E. Fitzsimmons	Quincy Stable (James Francis Johnson)	11/8	1:52.40
1920	The Porter	5	Harry Lunsford	William H. Brooks	Edward B. McLean	11/8	1:54.00
1919	Cudgel	5	Johnny Loftus	H. Guy Bedwell	J. K. L. Ross	11/8	1:50.00
1918	Slippery Elm	5	L. Stalker	Robert A. Smith	Woodland Stock Farm	1m, 70 yds.	1:44.00
1917	Omar Khayyam	3	Everett Haynes	Richard F. Carmen	Wilfrid Viau	11/8	1:53.00
1916	The Finn	4	Andy Schuttinger	Edward W. Heffner	Harry C. Hallenbeck	11/8	1:52.20
1915	Roamer	4	James Butwell	A. J. Goldsborough	Andrew Miller	11/8	1:51.20
1914	Robert Bradley	4	Eddie Ambrose	John Naylor	William R. Mizell	11/8	1:52.00
1913	Nightstick	3	Eddie Ambrose	Albert Simons	Harry P. Whitney	11/8	1:53.00
1912	Adams Express	4	Carroll Shilling	Frank M. Taylor	Harry C. Hallenbeck	11/8	1:54.00
