= Saratoga Special Stakes =

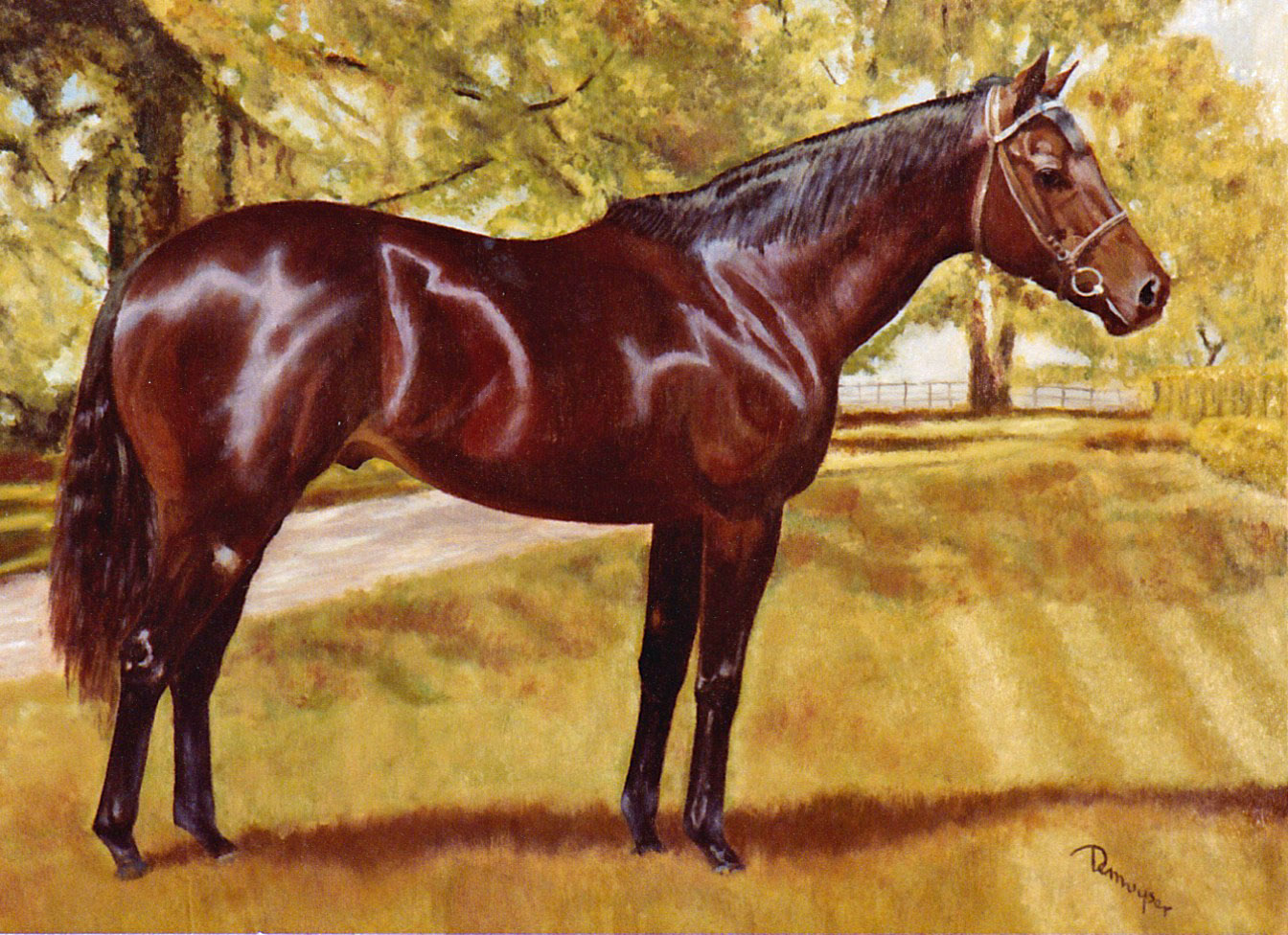
- Our Talisman, oil on canvas Painting by Bob Demuyser (1920–2003)
- Class: Grade II
- Location: Saratoga Race Course; Saratoga Springs, New York, United States
- Inaugurated: 1901
- Race type: Thoroughbred – Flat racing
- Website: www.nyra.com/saratoga

Race information
- Distance: 6 furlongs
- Surface: Dirt
- Track: left-handed
- Qualification: Two-year-olds
- Weight: Assigned
- Purse: $200,000 (since 2012)

The Saratoga Special Stakes is an American grade II thoroughbred horse race run annually in mid-August at Saratoga Race Course in Saratoga Springs, New York. The race is for two-year-olds willing to race six furlongs on the dirt.

With its first run in 1901, the Saratoga Special was a winner-take-all race until 1959 when it became a standard stakes race. The race was held at Belmont Park on the Widener Course in 1943, 1944, and 1945. There was no race in 1911 and 1912 due to the New York State legislated ban on parimutuel betting that led to the closure of all New York racetracks. There was also no race held in 2004.

Since inception it has been contested at various distances:

- 5.5 furlongs : 1901–1906
- 6 furlongs : 1907–1993, 2005, 2020
- 6 1/2 furlongs : 1994–2003, 2006–2019

Only four horses have ever won all three Saratoga Racecourse events for two-year-olds. Regret (1914), Campfire (1916), Dehere (1993), and City Zip (2000) each swept the Saratoga Special, Sanford Stakes and Hopeful Stakes.

== Records ==
Speed record:

- at 6 1/2 furlongs – 1:15.57 Corfu (2013)
- at 6 furlongs – 1:09 – General Assembly (1978)

Largest Margin of Victory:

- 10 1/2 lengths – D' Funnybone (2009)

Most wins by a jockey:

- 7 – Eddie Arcaro (1935, 1947, 1950, 1954, 1955, 1958, 1959)

Most wins by a trainer:

- 6 – James G. Rowe Sr. (1904, 1914, 1915, 1920, 1922, 1929)

Most wins by an owner:

- 4 – Harry Payne Whitney (1914, 1920, 1922, 1929)
- 4 – George D. Widener (1923, 1930, 1950, 1969)

== Winners ==
| Year | Winner | Jockey | Trainer | Owner | Time |
|---|---|---|---|---|---|
| 2026 | Twinkle Town | Jose L. Ortiz | Kenneth G. McPeek | Four G Racing | 1:16.44 |
| 2025 | Ewing | José Ortiz | Mark E. Casse | D. J. Stable, West Point Thoroughbreds & Kenneth Freirich | 1:18.03 |
| 2024 | Showcase | Irad Ortiz Jr. | Todd A. Pletcher | Harrell Ventures LLC | 1:16.40 |
| 2023 | Rhyme Schemes | Ricardo Santana Jr. | Norm Casse | Pura Vida Investments LLC | 1:17.12 |
| 2022 | Damon's Mound | Gabriel Saez | Michelle Lovell | Cliff Love & Michelle Love | 1:17.94 |
| 2021 | High Oak | Junior Alvarado | William I. Mott | LRE Racing and JEH Racing Stable | 1:16.53 |
| 2020 | Jackie's Warrior | Joel Rosario | Steven M. Asmussen | J. Kirk & Judy Robison | 1:09.62 |
| 2019 | Green Light Go | Junior Alvarado | Jimmy Jerkens | Stronach Stables | 1:15.68 |
| 2018 | Call Paul | Irad Ortiz Jr. | Jason Servis | Dubb, Simon, Bethlehem Stables LLC, Irom | 1:16.55 |
| 2017 | Copper Bullet | Irad Ortiz Jr. | Steven M. Asmussen | Winchell Thoroughbreds | 1:16.45 |
| 2016 | Gunnevera | Javier Castellano | Antonio Sano | Peacock Racing | 1:17.00 |
| 2015 | Exaggerator | Junior Alvarado | J. Keith Desormeaux | Big Chief Racing | 1:16.39 |
| 2014 | I Spent It | Javier Castellano | Tony Dutrow | A & J Lieblong | 1:16.79 |
| 2013 | Corfu | John Velazquez | Todd A. Pletcher | M. Tabor/S. Magnier/D. Smith | 1:15.57 |
| 2012 | Spurious Precision | Alan Garcia | Richard Violette Jr. | Klaravich Stables/William H. Lawrence | 1:16.53 |
| 2011 | Union Rags | Javier Castellano | Michael Matz | Chadds Ford Stable | 1:18.33 |
| 2010 | Kantharos | Garrett Gomez | Steven M. Asmussen | Stonestreet Stables | 1:18.63 |
| 2009 | D' Funnybone | Edgar Prado | Richard E. Dutrow Jr. | Paul Pompa Jr. | 1:17.58 |
| 2008 | Run Away and Hide | Robby Albarado | Ronny Werner | Kirk/Riordan/Bates | 1:15.67 |
| 2007 | Kodiak Kowboy | Shaun Bridgmohan | Steven M. Asmussen | Vinery Stables/Fox Hill | 1:15.95 |
| 2006 | Chace City | Edgar Prado | Scott Blasi | Gold Square | 1:16.83 |
| 2005 | Henny Hughes | Gary Stevens | Patrick Biancone | Darley Stable | 1:10.38 |
| 2004 | no race | | | | |
| 2003 | Cuvee | Jerry Bailey | Steven M. Asmussen | Ron Winchell | 1:15.97 |
| 2002 | Zavata | Jerry Bailey | Patrick Biancone | Michael B. Tabor | 1:17.65 |
| 2001 | Jump Start | Pat Day | D. Wayne Lukas | Overbrook Farm | 1:17.35 |
| 2000 | City Zip | José A. Santos | Linda L. Rice | Bowling & Thompson | 1:16.88 |
| 1999 | Bevo | Edgar Prado | William Badgett Jr. | Peter Callahan | 1:17.78 |
| 1998 | Prime Directive | Jorge Chavez | Cynthia G. Reese | Noreen Carpenito | 1:17.18 |
| 1997 | Favorite Trick | Pat Day | Patrick B. Byrne | Joseph LaCombe | 1:17.15 |
| 1996 | All Chatter | Jorge Chavez | Stanley M. Hough | Brodsky/Goslow/Shelley | 1:16.37 |
| 1995 | Bright Launch | José A. Santos | D. Wayne Lukas | James Spence | 1:17.98 |
| 1994 | Montreal Red | José A. Santos | Flint S. Schulhofer | Vendome Stables | 1:17.96 |
| 1993 | Dehere | Eddie Maple | Reynaldo H. Nobles | Due Process Stable | 1:09.92 |
| 1992 | Tactical Advantage | Julie Krone | Flint S. Schulhofer | Philip Teinowitz | 1:10.59 |
| 1991 | Caller I. D. | Jerry Bailey | Stanley M. Hough | Triumviri Stable | 1:09.55 |
| 1990 | To Freedom | Ángel Cordero Jr. | John J. Tammaro Jr. | Herman Heinlein | 1:11.56 |
| 1989 | Summer Squall | Pat Day | Neil J. Howard | Dogwood Stable | 1:09.94 |
| 1988 | Trapp Mountain | Jerry Bailey | George R. Arnold II | Loblolly Stable | 1:10.80 |
| 1987 | Crusader Sword | Robbie Davis | MacKenzie Miller | Rokeby Stable | 1:10.20 |
| 1986 | Gulch | Ángel Cordero Jr. | LeRoy Jolley | Peter M. Brant | 1:10.00 |
| 1985 | Sovereign Don | Jorge Velásquez | D. Wayne Lukas | Eugene V. Klein | 1:11.40 |
| 1984 | Chief's Crown | Don MacBeth | Roger Laurin | Andrew Rosen | 1:10.20 |
| 1983 | Swale | Eddie Maple | Woody Stephens | Claiborne Farm | 1:12.60 |
| 1982 | Victorious | Ángel Cordero Jr. | Gene Jacobs | Herbert A. Allen Sr. | 1:10.60 |
| 1981 | Conquistador Cielo | Eddie Maple | Woody Stephens | Henryk de Kwiatkowski | 1:10.60 |
| 1980 | Well Decorated | Michael Venezia | Gene Jacobs | Herbert A. Allen Sr. | 1:10.20 |
| 1979 | J. P. Brother | Eddie Maple | John P. Campo | Diamond Peg Stable | 1:12.00 |
| 1978 | General Assembly | Darrel McHargue | LeRoy Jolley | Bertram R. Firestone | 1:09.00 |
| 1977 | Darby Creek Road | Ángel Cordero Jr. | Lou Rondinello | James Phillips | 1:10.00 |
| 1976 | Banquet Table | Jacinto Vásquez | George T. Poole Jr. | C. V. Whitney | 1:11.60 |
| 1975 | Bold Forbes | Jorge Velásquez | Lazaro S. Barrera | E. Rodriquez Tizol | 1:09.80 |
| 1974 | Our Talisman | Michael Venezia | Eddie Yowell | Oak Crest Stable | 1:10.40 |
| 1973 | Az Igazi | Michael Venezia | Homer C. Pardue | Joseph R. Straus | 1:11.00 |
| 1972 | Stop The Music | Jacinto Vásquez | John M. Gaver Sr. | Greentree Stable | 1:11.20 |
| 1971 | Tarboosh | Eddie Maple | Reggie Cornell | Calumet Farm | 1:10.40 |
| 1970 | Three Martinis | Ángel Cordero Jr. | Roger Laurin | Edward Sawyer | 1:10.80 |
| 1969 | Pontifex | Pete Anderson | Sylvester E. Veitch | George D. Widener Jr. | 1:11.60 |
| 1968 | Reviewer | Braulio Baeza | Edward A. Neloy | Ogden Phipps | 1:10.40 |
| 1967 | Vitriolic | Braulio Baeza | Edward A. Neloy | Ogden Phipps | 1:10.40 |
| 1966 | Favorable Turn | Bobby Ussery | Eugene Jacobs | Herbert A. Allen Sr. | 1:10.60 |
| 1965 | Impressive | Braulio Baeza | Edward A. Neloy | Ogden Phipps | 1:10.20 |
| 1964 | Sadair | Manuel Ycaza | Les Lear | Mary B. Hecht | 1:10.60 |
| 1963 | Duel | Braulio Baeza | Moody Jolley | Claiborne Farm | 1:10.80 |
| 1962 | Mr. Cold Storage | Johnny Sellers | Sidney Jacobs | Winding Way Farm | 1:12.60 |
| 1961 | Battle Joined | Manuel Ycaza | Woody Stephens | Cain Hoy Stable | 1:10.00 |
| 1960 | Bronzerullah | Raymond York | Lucien Laurin | Frank A. Sherman | 1:11.60 |
| 1959 | Irish Lancer | Eddie Arcaro | Norman McLeod | Pebblebrook Farm | 1:12.00 |
| 1958 | First Landing | Eddie Arcaro | Casey Hayes | Christopher Chenery | 1:12.80 |
| 1957 | Grey Monarch | Jimmy Nichols | Horatio Luro | E. P. Taylor | 1:13.60 |
| 1956 | Nearctic | Gordon McCann | Gordon McCann | E. P. Taylor | 1:13.00 |
| 1955 | Polly's Jet | Eddie Arcaro | Russell Downes | Barclay Stable | 1:11.40 |
| 1954 | Royal Coinage | Eddie Arcaro | Anthony J. Pupino | Clearwater Stable | 1:12.20 |
| 1953 | Turn-To | Henry Moreno | Eddie Hayward | Cain Hoy Stable | 1:12.80 |
| 1952 | Native Dancer | Eric Guerin | William C. Winfrey | Alfred Gwynne Vanderbilt Jr. | 1:13.20 |
| 1951 | Cousin | Eric Guerin | William C. Winfrey | Alfred Gwynne Vanderbilt Jr. | 1:12.00 |
| 1950 | Battlefield. | Eddie Arcaro | Bert Mulholland | George D. Widener Jr. | 1:11.20 |
| 1949 | More Sun | Gordon Glisson | Preston M. Burch | Brookmeade Stable | 1:13.80 |
| 1948 | Blue Peter | Eric Guerin | Andy Schuttinger | Joseph M. Roebling | 1:13.00 |
| 1947 | Better Self | Eddie Arcaro | Max Hirsch | King Ranch | 1:12.80 |
| 1946 | Grand Admiral | Job Dean Jessop | Preston M. Burch | Brookmeade Stable | 1:13.40 |
| 1945 | Mist o'Gold | Wayne D. Wright | Don Cameron | Vera S. Bragg | 1:10.60 |
| 1944 | Pavot | George Woolf | Oscar White | Walter M. Jeffords | 1:09.60 |
| 1943 | Cocopet | Conn McCreary | Oleg Dubassoff | Lazy F Ranch | 1:10.60 |
| 1942 | Halberd | George Woolf | Oscar White | Sarah F. Jeffords | 1:13.00 |
| 1941 | Amphitheatre | Alfred Robertson | John M. Gaver Sr. | Manhasset Stable | 1:11.60 |
| 1940 | Whirlaway | Johnny Longden | Ben A. Jones | Calumet Farm | 1:11.20 |
| 1939 | Bimelech | Fred A. Smith | Bill Hurley | Edward R. Bradley | 1:10.80 |
| 1938 | El Chico | Nick Wall | Matthew P. Brady | William Ziegler Jr. | 1:10.40 |
| 1937 | Pumpkin | John Gilbert | John M. Gaver Sr. | John Hay Whitney | 1:12.60 |
| 1936 | Forty Winks | Raymond Workman | John M. Gaver Sr. | Greentree Stable | 1:13.80 |
| 1935 | Red Rain | Raymond Workman | Thomas J. Healey | C. V. Whitney | 1:13.00 |
| 1935 | Coldstream † | Eddie Arcaro | Albert Gordon | Coldstream Stud | 1:13.00 |
| 1934 | Boxthorn † | Don Meade | Bill Hurley | Edward R. Bradley | 1:13.00 |
| 1933 | Wise Daughter | John Gilbert | Sherrill W. Ward | Frederick A. Burton | 1:12.60 |
| 1932 | Happy Gal | Thomas Malley | Jim Fitzsimmons | Belair Stud | 1:13.00 |
| 1931 | Top Flight | Raymond Workman | Thomas J. Healey | C. V. Whitney | 1:12.00 |
| 1930 | Jamestown | Linus McAtee | A. Jack Joyner | George D. Widener Jr. | 1:11.40 |
| 1929 | Whichone | Linus McAtee | James G. Rowe Jr. | Harry Payne Whitney | 1:13.80 |
| 1928 | Blue Larkspur | Anthony Pascuma | Herbert J. Thompson | Idle Hour Stable | 1:13.60 |
| 1927 | Ariel | Laverne Fator | Sam Hildreth | Rancocas Stable | 1:12.60 |
| 1926 | Chance Shot | Earl Sande | Pete Coyne | Joseph E. Widener | 1:13.00 |
| 1925 | Haste | Earl Sande | G. Hamilton Keene | Joseph E. Widener | 1:12.40 |
| 1924 | Sunny Man | Laverne Fator | J. P. "Sammy" Smith | Willis Sharpe Kilmer | 1:12.40 |
| 1923 | St. James | Earl Sande | A. Jack Joyner | George D. Widener Jr. | 1:11.60 |
| 1922 | Goshawk | Linus McAtee | James G. Rowe Sr. | Harry Payne Whitney | 1:12.20 |
| 1921 | Morvich | Frank Keogh | Fred Burlew | Benjamin Block | 1:12.20 |
| 1920 | Tryster | José Rodriguez | James G. Rowe Sr. | Harry Payne Whitney | 1:12.60 |
| 1919 | Golden Broom | Eddie Ambrose | Mike Daly | Sarah F. Jeffords | 1:12.80 |
| 1918 | Hannibal | Lavelle Ensor | Thomas J. Healey | Richard T. Wilson Jr. | 1:16.20 |
| 1917 | Sun Briar | Willie Knapp | Henry McDaniel | Willis Sharpe Kilmer | 1:15.00 |
| 1916 | Campfire | John McTaggart | Thomas J. Healey | Richard T. Wilson Jr. | 1:13.20 |
| 1915 | Dominant | Thomas McTaggart | James G. Rowe Sr. | Lewis S. Thompson | 1:16.00 |
| 1914 | Regret | Joe Notter | James G. Rowe Sr. | Harry Payne Whitney | 1:11.60 |
| 1913 | Roamer | George Byrne | A. J. Goldsborough | Andrew Miller | 1:13.00 |
| 1910 | Novelty | Cal Shilling | Sam Hildreth | Sam Hildreth | 1:14.40 |
| 1909 | Waldo | David Nicol | Raleigh Colston Jr. | Charles L. Harrison | 1:15.80 |
| 1908 | Sir Martin | Cal Shilling | John E. Madden | John E. Madden | 1:18.80 |
| 1907 | Colin | Walter Miller | Jim Fitzsimmons | James R. Keene | 1:12.00 |
| 1906 | Salvidere | LaVerne Sewell | John E. Madden | Tommy Hitchcock Jr. | 1:12.40 |
| 1905 | Mohawk II | Arthur Redfern | John H. Hynes | John Sanford | 1:07.00 |
| 1904 | Sysonby | Arthur Redfern | James G. Rowe Sr. | James R. Keene | 1:07.00 |
| 1903 | Aristocracy | Frank O'Neill | John E. Madden | John E. Madden | 1:11.80 |
| 1902 | Irish Lad | Nash Turner | John E. Madden | Whitney / Duryea | 1:08.20 |
| 1901 | Goldsmith | Nash Turner | John W. Rogers | William C. Whitney | 1:08.80 |

- In 1953, Porterhouse finished first, but was disqualified and set back to last.
- † In 1935, there was a dead heat for first.
