= Saratoga Handicap =

Defunct American thoroughbred horse race

- Class: Discontinued stakes
- Location: Saratoga Race Course; Saratoga Springs, New York, United States
- Inaugurated: 1901–1961
- Race type: Thoroughbred – Flat racing

Race information
- Distance: 1 1/4 miles (10 furlongs)
- Surface: Dirt
- Track: left-handed
- Qualification: Three-years-old and up

The Saratoga Handicap was an American Thoroughbred horse race run annually at the Saratoga Race Course in Saratoga Springs, New York. It was open to horses three years old and upward and raced at a distance of 1¼ miles on dirt. First run in 1901, after sixty years it had its final running in 1961 that was won by Divine Comedy ridden by future Hall of Fame jockey Bill Shoemaker on his 30th birthday. Government wartime restrictions saw the 1943 edition run at Belmont Park.

== The 1911–1912 statewide shutdown of New York horse racing ==
On June 11, 1908, the Republican controlled New York Legislature under Governor Charles Evans Hughes passed the Hart–Agnew anti-betting legislation with penalties allowing for fines and up to a year in prison. In spite of strong opposition by prominent owners such as August Belmont Jr. and Harry Payne Whitney, reform legislators were not happy when they learned that betting was still going on between individuals at racetracks and they had further restrictive legislation passed by the New York Legislature in 1910 that made it possible for racetrack owners and members of its board of directors to be fined and imprisoned if anyone was found betting, even privately, anywhere on their premises. After a 1911 amendment to the law to limit the liability of owners and directors was defeated, every racetrack in New York State shut down. As a result, the Saratoga Handicap was not run in 1911 and 1912.

== Records ==
Speed record:

- 2:01.60 – 1¼ miles, Lucky Draw (1946)

Most wins:

- 3 – Roamer (1915, 1917, 1918)

Most wins by a jockey:

- 6 – Conn McCreary (1941, 1943, 1945, 1946, 1953, 1956)

Most wins by a trainer:

- 5 – A. J. Goldsborough (1915, 1917, 1918, 1921, 1923)

Most wins by an owner:

- 3 – Andrew Miller (1915, 1917, 1918)

== Winners ==
Year	Winner	Age	Jockey	Trainer	Owner	Dist. (Miles)	Time
1961	Divine Comedy	4	Bill Shoemaker	Stanley T. Greene	Llangollen Farm Stable	1¼ M	2:02.20
1960	Race not held						
1959	Bald Eagle	4	Manuel Ycaza	Woody Stephens	Cain Hoy Stable	1¼ M	2:03.00
1958	Admiral Vee	6	Ted Atkinson	H. Allen Jerkens	Edward Seinfeld	1¼ M	2:06.60
1957	Reneged	4	Bobby Ussery	Homer C. Pardue	Woodley Lane Farm (Joe Straus/Lafayette Ward/Steven B. Wilson)	1¼ M	2:04.60
1956	Paper Tiger	5	Conn McCreary	Hirsch Jacobs	Ethel D. Jacobs	1¼ M	2:04.20
1955	Social Outcast	5	Eric Guerin	Bill Winfrey	Alfred Gwynne Vanderbilt II	1¼ M	2:04.40
1954	Cold Command	5	Hedley Woodhouse	Sylvester Veitch	Cornelius Vanderbilt Whitney	1¼ M	2:05.80
1953	Alerted	5	Conn McCreary	James Penrod	Hampton Stable (Frank Stout)	1¼ M	2:05.60
1952	One Hitter	6	Ted Atkinson	John M. Gaver Sr.	Greentree Stable	1¼ M	2:05.00
1951	Lone Eagle	5	George Hettinger	Charles M. Feltner	Gustave Ring	1¼ M	2:04.00
1950	Better Self	5	William Boland	Max Hirsch	King Ranch	1¼ M	2:05.60
1949	Donor	5	Warren Mehrtens	George "Maje" Odom	W. Deering Howe	1¼ M	2:04.00
1948	Loyal Legion	4	Ted Atkinson	Oscar White	Walter M. Jeffords Sr.	1¼ M	2:03.20
1947	Rico Monte	5	Eddie Arcaro	Horatio Luro	W. Arnold Hanger	1¼ M	2:03.40
1946	Lucky Draw	5	Conn McCreary	Winbert F. Mulholland	George D. Widener Jr.	1¼ M	2:01.60
1945	Olympic Zenith	4	Conn McCreary	William Booth	William G. Helis	1¼ M	2:02.80
1944	Paperboy	6	Warren Mehrtens	Jimmy Coleman	W-L Ranch Co.	1¼ M	2:02.20
1943	Princequillo	3	Conn McCreary	Horatio Luro	Boone Hall Stable	1¼ M	2:01.80
1942	Can't Wait	7	Wendell Eads	J. Thomas Taylor	Myron Selznick	1¼ M	2:05.00
1941	Haltal	4	Conn McCreary	Steve Judge	Royce G. Martin	1¼ M	2:05.80
1940	Sickle T	5	Ronnie Nash	Jack Hayes	Florence D. Whitaker	1¼ M	2:03.00
1939	Eight Thirty	3	Don Meade	Winbert F. Mulholland	George D. Widener Jr.	1¼ M	2:03.60
1938	War Admiral	4	Charles Kurtsinger	George H. Conway	Glen Riddle Farm	1¼ M	2:06.00
1937	Esposa	5	Nick Wall	Matthew P. Brady	Middleburg Stable (William Ziegler Jr.)	1¼ M	2:08.40
1936	Discovery	5	John Bejshak	Joseph H. Stotler	Alfred Gwynne Vanderbilt II	1¼ M	2:05.00
1935	Vicar	4	Willie Saunders	James E. Fitzsimmons	Belair Stud	1¼ M	2:03.80
1934	Watch Him	5	Earl Steffen	Frank S. Hackett	Fannie Hertz	1¼ M	2:06.60
1933	Caesar's Ghost	3	Dominick Bellizi	Robert Augustus Smith	Brookmeade Stable	1¼ M	2:07.20
1932	Faireno	3	Tommy Malley	James E. Fitzsimmons	Belair Stud	1¼ M	2:04.60
1931	St. Brideaux	3	Charles Kurtsinger	William Brennan	Greentree Stable	1¼ M	2:04.00
1930	Marine	4	Frank J. Baker	Harry Giddings Jr.	Mount Royal Stable (Kenneth T. Dawes, et al.)	1¼ M	2:04.20
1929	Diavolo	4	John Maiben	James E. Fitzsimmons	Wheatley Stable	1¼ M	2:03.60
1928	Chance Shot	4	Earl Sande	Peter W. Coyne	Joseph E. Widener	1¼ M	2:06.00
1927	Mars	4	Earl Sande	Scott P. Harlan	Walter M. Jeffords Sr.	1¼ M	2:07.60
1926	Princess Doreen	5	Charlie McTague	Kay Spence	Audley Farm Stable	1¼ M	2:08.40
1925	Valador	5	John Callahan	Tom Moran	William Martin	1¼ M	2:05.60
1924	My Own	4	Earl Sande	William P. Burch	Salubria Stable	1¼ M	2:05.60
1923	Prince James	5	Laverne Fator	A. J. Goldsborough	Charles H. Thieriot	1¼ M	2:09.40
1922	Grey Lag	4	Laverne Fator	Sam Hildreth	Rancocas Stable	1¼ M	2:03.20
1921	Yellow Hand	4	C. H. Miller	A. J. Goldsborough	Charles Stoneham	1¼ M	2:03.80
1920	Sir Barton	4	Earl Sande	H. Guy Bedwell	J. K. L. Ross	1¼ M	2:01.80
1919	Purchase	3	William Knapp	Sam Hildreth	Sam Hildreth	1¼ M	2:02.40
1918	Roamer	7	Frank Robinson	A. J. Goldsborough	Andrew Miller	1¼ M	2:02.20
1917	Roamer	6	James H. Butwell	A. J. Goldsborough	Andrew Miller	1¼ M	2:06.20
1916	Stromboli	5	John McTaggart	Sam Hildreth	August Belmont Jr.	1¼ M	2:05.20
1915	Roamer	4	James H. Butwell	A. J. Goldsborough	Andrew Miller	1¼ M	2:04.40
1914	Borrow	6	Joe Notter	James G. Rowe Sr.	Lewis S. Thompson	1¼ M	2:05.40
1913	Cock O' The Walk	3	Buddy Glass	John P. Mayberry	Frederick Johnson	1¼ M	2:06.00
1912	No races held due to the Hart–Agnew Law.						
1911	No races held due to the Hart–Agnew Law.						
1910	Olambala	4	James H. Butwell	T. J. Healey	Montpelier Stable	1¼ M	2:08.60
1909	Affliction	3	Eddie Martin	James G. Rowe Sr.	James R. Keene	1¼ M	2:05.00
1908	Montfort	4	Joe McCahey	T. J. Healey	Montpelier Stable	1¼ M	2:05.80
1907	McCarter	3	Walter Miller	Thomas Welsh	Newcastle Stable	1¼ M	2:05.60
1906	Dandelion	4	LaVerne Sewell	John E. Madden	Francis R. Hitchcock	1¼ M	2:04.60
1905	Caughnawaga	6	Tommy Burns	Hubert H. Hyner	John Sanford	1¼ M	2:07.00
1904	Lord of the Vale	4	Lucien Lyne	A. Jack Joyner	August Belmont Jr.	1¼ M	2:05.00
1903	Waterboy	4	George M. Odom	A. Jack Joyner	James Ben Ali Haggin	1¼ M	2:05.20
1902	Francesco	3	Harry Michaels	Richard O. Miller	Charles F. Dwyer	13/16 M	1:59.00
1901	Rockton	4	Nash Turner	William Hayward Jr.	W. H. Sealey	11/8 M	1:53.20

- Ŧ Woodley Lane Farm was the nom de course for Joe Straus, Lafayette Ward, and Steven B. Wilson
