= Pierrepont Handicap =

American thoroughbred horse race

- Class: Discontinued stakes
- Location: Jamaica Race Course; Jamaica, Queens, New York; United States
- Inaugurated: 1887–1907
- Race type: Thoroughbred – Flat racing

Race information
- Distance: 1904–1918, 1926–1932 : 1 1/8 miles (9 furlongs); 1919–1925 : 1 1/4 miles (10 furlongs)
- Surface: Dirt
- Track: left-handed
- Qualification: 1904–1909 : two years & older 1910–1932 : three years & older

The Pierrepont Handicap was an American Thoroughbred horse race first run in 1904 at the Jamaica Race Course in Jamaica, Queens, New York operated by the Metropolitan Jockey Club which had begun racing operations the previous year. The race was open to three-year-olds of either sex and run on dirt over a distance of 1 1/8 miles.

== Race history ==
The inaugural running of the Pierrepont was the feature event of the October 17, 1904 racecard and was won by Dolly Spanker who was trained by future U.S. Racing Hall of Fame inductee T. J. Healey. In 1905's second edition, the two time Champion racemare Eugenia Burch set a new track record while carrying top weight in a field of thirteen.

=== Disruption ===
The 1880s saw intense lobbying by a moralist movement to have betting on horse racing banned in the states of New Jersey and New York. They achieved their goals in New Jersey when the 1893 election gave Republicans control of the New Jersey Legislature who then passed legislation on March 21, 1894 that banned betting on horse racing in that state. The bill was signed into law by Democratic Governor George Werts, the effect of which was the complete cessation of horse racing in New Jersey that would last for more than five decades until the law was rescinded in 1946. The moralists then stepped up their activities to obtain the same ban in New York state which caused years of uncertainty. With the state's Hart–Agnew anti-wagering legislation in process, the Jamaica Race Course saw its opening day betting drop from $20,000 in 1907 to just $900 in 1908. For the track's fall racing program, the Pierrepont Handicap had to be dropped from the schedule. Although the race returned in 1909, and was won by James R. Keene's future U.S. Racing Hall of Fame inductee Maskette, it would be the last time it was held until 1918. That year Roamer, another future Hall of Fame inductee, won what was the sixth running of the Pierrepont Handicap.

The severe financial difficulties of the Great Depression would spell the end for the Pierrepont Handicap in 1932. The final running was won by Sonny Whitney's four-year-old horse Halcyon.

== Records ==
Speed record:

- 1 1/8 miles: 1:51.00 – Distraction (1929)
- 1 1/4 miles: 2:04.00 – Blind Play (1925)

Most wins:

- No horse won this race more than once

Most wins by a jockey:

- 3 – Laverne Fator (1923, 1925, 1927)

Most wins by a trainer:

- 4 – T. J. Healey (1904, 1919, 1928, 1932)

Most wins by an owner:

- 2 – Richard T. Wilson Jr. (1904, 1919)
- 2 – James R. Keene (1907, 1909)
- 2 – Belair Stud Stable (1924, 1931)

== Winners ==
Year	Winner	Age	Jockey	Trainer	Owner	Dist. (Miles)	Time	Win$
1932	Halcyon	4	Alfred Robertson	T. J. Healey	C. V. Whitney	11/8 M	1:52.40	$1,700
1931	Ormesby	3	Eddie DeCamillis	James E. Fitzsimmons	Belair Stud Stable	11/8 M	1:55.60	$2,980
1930	Sun Edwin	5	Linus McAtee	George M. Odom	Arden Farms	11/8 M	1:55.00	$5,300
1929	Distraction	4	James H. Burke	James E. Fitzsimmons	Wheatley Stable	11/8 M	1:51.00	$5,950
1928	Black Panther	4	Frank Moon	T. J. Healey	Walter J. Salmon Sr.	11/8 M	1:51.20	$6,100
1927	Kentucky	3	Laverne Fator	Max Hirsch	A. Charles Schwartz	11/8 M	1:51.60	$6,050
1926	Peanuts	4	George Ellis	George M. Odom	Robert L. Gerry	11/8 M	1:51.40	$6,050
1925	Blind Play	4	Laverne Fator	Louis Feustel	Log Cabin Stable (W. A. Harriman & G. H. Walker)	11/4 M	2:04.00	$6,250
1924	Aga Khan	3	Edgar Barnes	James E. Fitzsimmons	Belair Stud Stable	11/4 M	2:01.80	$6,250
1923	Sunsini	3	Laverne Fator	Frank M. Bray	Lilane Stable (Mrs. William L. Walker)	11/4 M	2:04.80	$4,750
1922	Mad Hatter	6	Earl Sande	Sam Hildreth	Rancocas Stable	11/4 M	2:03.40	$4,850
1921	Audacious	5	Clarence Kummer	Sandy McNaughton	Foreign Stable	11/4 M	2:06.80	$4,950
1920	Cirrus	4	Lavelle Ensor	Sam Hildreth	Sam Hildreth	11/4 M	2:06.00	$4,850
1919	Hannibal	3	Clarence Kummer	T. J. Healey	Richard T. Wilson Jr.	11/8 M	2:00.80	$2,550
1918	Roamer	7	Andy Schuttinger	A. J. Goldsborough	Andrew Miller	11/8 M	1:52.60	$2,550
1910	– 1917	Race not held						
1909	Maskette	3	James Butwell	James G. Rowe Sr.	James R. Keene	11/8 M	1:54.40	$2,000
1908		Race not held						
1907	Gretna Green	3	Walter Miller	James G. Rowe Sr.	James R. Keene	11/8 M	1:53.40	$2,925
1906	Belmere	3	James Hennessy	Fred Burlew	Fred Burlew	11/8 M	1:54.80	$3,120
1905	Eugenia Burch	5	William B. Buchanan	W. P. Maxwell	Libby Curtis	11/8 M	1:52.80	$3,075
1904	Dolly Spanker	3	Arthur Redfern	T. J. Healey	Richard T. Wilson Jr.	11/8 M	1:53.40	$2,550
