= Running Water (horse) =

American thoroughbred

- Sire: Sir Dixon
- Grandsire: Billet
- Dam: Breakwater
- Damsire: Hindoo
- Sex: Mare
- Foaled: 1903
- Country: United States
- Colour: Bay
- Breeder: Runnymede Stud
- Owner: 1) Woodford Clay; 2) Newcastle Stable; 3) Herman B. Duryea
- Trainer: Thomas Welsh
- Record: 47: 16-12-5
- Earnings: US$53,565

Major wins
- Great Filly Stakes (1905); Distaff Stakes (1905); Rosebuds Stakes (1905); Alabama Stakes (1906); Edgemere Handicap (1906); Ramapo Handicap (1906); Second Special Stakes (1906); Merchants and Citizens Handicap (1907); Saratoga Cup (1907)

Awards
- American Co-Champion Three-Year-Old Filly (1906)

Running Water (foaled 1903 at Runnymede Farm near Paris, Kentucky) was an American Champion Thoroughbred racemare.

== Breeding ==
Running Water was sired by the 1888 Belmont Stakes winner Sir Dixon who also sired 1905 Kentucky Derby winner Agile and the good filly, Blue Girl. Running Water's mare was Breakwater whose sire was Hindoo, a three-time U.S. Champion, the 1881 Kentucky Derby winner and a U.S. Racing Hall of Fame inductee.

== Racing career ==
Owned and trained by Woodford Clay, he raced Running Water at age two and for most of her three-year-old season until selling her on August 8, 1906, to trainer Thomas Welsh and the Newcastle Stable, a racing and breeding partnership made up of Andrew Miller, Francis R. Bishop and Blair Painter.

The American Co-Champion Three-Year-Old Filly of 1906, Running Water had a redoubtable career in Thoroughbred racing during which she won top races against the best competition including beating male opponents on a regular basis. In winning the Merchants and Citizens Handicap she set a new Saratoga Race Course track record while beating the highly touted John Madden-trained colt Dandelion as well as Preakness Stakes and Brooklyn Derby winner Cairngorm. In the Saratoga Cup, run at a distance of a mile and three-quarters, she defeated the likes of Travers Stakes winner Frank Gill and Suburban Handicap winner Nealon.

== Broodmare in France ==
Due to the Hart–Agnew Law, racing was shut down in all of New York state in 1911 and 1912. As a result, in 1910 Running Water had to be sent to American Herman Duryea's Haras du Gazon stud farm in Bazoches-au-Houlme in France so she could be bred. Running Water's French-born offspring included Boyne, Breakwater, Mayflower, Pierre Qui Roule, Rappahannock, Reprise, Rochebelle, and Runlad.

== Pedigree ==
Pedigree of Running Water, bay mare, 1903
Sire Sir Dixon	Billet	Voltigeur	Voltaire
Sire Sir Dixon	Billet	Voltigeur	Martha Lynn
Sire Sir Dixon	Billet	Calcutta	Flatcatcher
Sire Sir Dixon	Billet	Calcutta	Miss Martin
Sire Sir Dixon	Jaconet	Leamington	Faugh-a-Ballagh
Sire Sir Dixon	Jaconet	Leamington	Pantaloon Mare
Sire Sir Dixon	Jaconet	Maggie B B	Australian
Sire Sir Dixon	Jaconet	Maggie B B	Madeline
Dam Breakwater	Hindoo	Virgil	Vandal
Dam Breakwater	Hindoo	Virgil	Hymenia
Dam Breakwater	Hindoo	Florence	Lexington
Dam Breakwater	Hindoo	Florence	Weatherwitch
Dam Breakwater	Ricochet	Musket	Toxophilite
Dam Breakwater	Ricochet	Musket	West Australian mare
Dam Breakwater	Ricochet	Erycina	Sledmere
Dam Breakwater	Ricochet	Erycina	Atalanta (family: 2-c)
