= Merritt C. Buxton =

American jockey

Personal information
- Born: December 14, 1889 East Aurora, New York
- Died: May 9, 1951 (aged 61) Jamaica, New York
- Occupations: Jockey & Trainer

Horse racing career
- Sport: Horse racing

Major racing wins
- Jockey wins: Santa Cruz Handicap (1907); Michaelmas Handicap (1913); Bashford Manor Stakes (1914, 1915); Carter Handicap (1914)); Champagne Stakes (1914); Demoiselle Stakes (1914, 1915, 1917); Juvenile Stakes (1914, 1915); Mount Vernon Handicap (1914); Chesterbrook Handicap (1915); Golden Rod Stakes (1916); Pimlico Nursery Stakes (1916); Astoria Stakes (1917); Lawrence Realization Stakes (1917); Manhattan Handicap (1917); Merchants and Citizens Handicap (1917); Municipal Handicap (1917) American Classics wins: Belmont Stakes (1914) Trainer wins: Ohio Derby (1931, 1932); Tremont Stakes (1931); Fountain of Youth Stakes (1947, 1948)

Racing awards
- U.S. Champion Jockey by wins (1913); U. S. Champion Jockey by earnings (1913)

Significant horses
- Cock o' the Walk, Luke McLuke, Roamer, Omar Khayyam, War Cloud

Merritt Clifford "Happy" Buxton (December 14, 1889 - May 9, 1951) was a United States Thoroughbred horse racing national champion jockey who in 1913 captured both the National win and the National earnings titles. When his riding career was over, he went on to become a successful trainer and owner.

Merritt Buxton was the brother of Clarence Buxton, also a successful jockey and trainer. Merritt's son, Merritt A. Buxton, would follow in his father and uncle's footsteps and become a jockey and trainer.
