= Mount Vernon Handicap =

- Class: Discontinued stakes
- Location: Empire City Race Track, Yonkers, New York, United States
- Inaugurated: 1907
- Race type: Thoroughbred - Flat racing

Race information
- Distance: 1 mile, 70 yards
- Surface: Dirt
- Track: left-handed
- Qualification: Three-year-olds and up

The Mount Vernon Handicap was an American Thoroughbred horse race run in twenty-one of the years between 1907 and 1930 at Empire City Race Track in Yonkers, New York with one year only in 1915 at Aqueduct Racetrack in Queens, New York. There was no race held from 1911 thru 1913 as a result of anti-betting legislation passed by the New York Legislature under Governor Charles Evans Hughes. Titled the Hart-Agnew, transgressors of the law faced substantial fines and up to a year in prison.

First run on August 7, 1913, the Mount Vernon Handicap was a sprint race of about three-quarters of a mile and was won by Samuel Hyman's five-year-old gelding, Quadrille. The following year the race was changed to one mile, a distance that would continue thru 1924 when it was increased to one mile and seventy yards.

Andrew Miller’s 1918 winner Roamer would have a career that saw him receive American Thoroughbred racing’s highest honor with induction into the National Museum of Racing and Hall of Fame.

In winning the 1924 Mount Vernon Handicap, August Belmont Jr.'s Ordinance broke the track record for the one mile distance on dirt. The three-year-old colt's time of 1:38 flat would hold up as the Mount Vernon Handicap's fastest time at the Empire City track.

== Records ==
Speed record:

- 1:36.60 @ 1 mile : Sam Jackson (1915) (Aqueduct Racetrack)
- 1:38.00 @ 1 mile : Ordinance (1924) (Empire City Race Track)
- 1:42.80 @ 1 mile, 70 yards : Sarazen (1926)

Most wins:

- No horse won this race more than once.

Most wins by a jockey:

- 2 - John Callahan (1925, 1927)

Most wins by a trainer:

- No trainer won this race more than once.

Most wins by an owner:

- 2 - August Belmont Jr. (1909, 1924)

== Winners ==
Year	Winner	Age	Jockey	Trainer	Owner	Dist. (Miles)	Time	Win $
1930	Questionnaire	3	Alfred Robertson	Andy Schuttinger	James Butler	1m, 70yds	1:45.00	$4,570
1929	Light Carbine	6	George C. Rose	Michael J. Dunleavy	Ira B. Humphreys	1m, 70yds	1:44.40	$5,180
1928	Juggler	4	Edward Watters	Stephen J. Lawler	Arthur H. Waterman	1m, 70yds	1:46.00	$5,545
1927	Dolan	3	John Callahan	Edward W. Heffner	Edward F. Cooney	1m, 70yds	1:44.80	$5,130
1926	Sarazen	5	Fritz Weiner	Max Hirsch	Fair Stable	1m, 70yds	1:42.80	$4,845
1925	Sun Pal	4	John Callahan	Selby Burch	Lee Rosenberg	1m, 70yds	1:44.00	$5,250
1924	Ordinance	3	Clarence Kummer	Louis Feustel	August Belmont Jr.	1 m	1:38.00	$6,745
1923	Brainstorm	4	Benny Marinelli	Joseph Edwards	Mirasol Stable (Henry Waterson)	1 m	1:39.00	$6,040
1922	Dr. Clark	5	Mack Garner	Mose Goldblatt	Mose Goldblatt	1 m	1:39.00	$5,205
1921	Naturalist	7	Clarence Turner	Thomas Welsh	Joseph E. Widener	1 m	1:40.40	$4,530
1920	Irish Dream	3	Tommy Rowan	Charles White	Kilrane Stable	1 m	1:40.80	$3,170
1919	Lucullite	4	Laverne Fator	Sam Hildreth	Sam Hildreth	1 m	1:40.40	$2,325
1918	Roamer	7	Lawrence Lyke	A. J. Goldsborough	Andrew Miller	1 m	1:40.20	$2,325
1917	St. Isidore	4	Morris Rowan	George M. Odom	Brighton Stable	1 m	1:40.20	$2,325
1916	Boots	5	Robert Hoffman	Walter C. Jennings	Oscar Lewisohn	1 m	1:39.00	$2,180
1915	Sam Jackson	7	Tommy McTaggart	Jack L. McGinnis	T. J. O'Brien	1 m	1:36.60	$1,875
1914	Surprising	3	Merritt C. Buxton	Richard F. Carman Sr.	Richard F. Carman Sr.	1 m	1:40.60	$1,985
1913	No races held due to New York State’s Hart–Agnew Law							
1911/12	No races held due to New York State’s Hart–Agnew Law							
1910	Hanbridge	5	Frederick Herbert	George Ham	George H. Holle	1 m	1:41.20	$1,925
1909	Half Sovereign	4	Eddie Dugan	John Whalen	August Belmont Jr.	1 m	1:39.00	$1,925
1908	Jack Atkin	4	Joe Notter	Herman R. Brandt	Barney Schreiber	1 m	1:40.80	$2,390
1907	Quadrille	5	Herman Moesel	Richard E. Watkins	Samuel Hyman	6 F (±)	1:09.20	$1,630
