= Blue Peter (American horse) =

American-bred Thoroughbred racehorse

- Sire: War Admiral
- Grandsire: Man o' War
- Dam: Carillon
- Damsire: Case Ace
- Sex: Stallion
- Foaled: 1946
- Country: United States
- Color: Bay
- Breeder: Joseph M. Roebling
- Owner: Joseph M. Roebling
- Trainer: Andy Schuttinger
- Record: 10: 8-0-2
- Earnings: $189,185

Major wins
- Belmont Futurity Stakes (1948); Garden State Futurity (1948); Hopeful Stakes (1948); Sapling Stakes (1948); Saratoga Special Stakes (1948); William Penn Stakes (1948)

Awards
- American Champion Two-Year-Old Colt (1948)

Honors
- Aiken Thoroughbred Racing Hall of Fame (1977)

Blue Peter (1946–1950) was an American Thoroughbred Champion racehorse.

== Background ==
Bred and raced by Joseph M. Roebling, great-grandson of John A. Roebling, who built the Brooklyn Bridge, Blue Peter was out of the mare Carillon, a granddaughter of Teddy. He was sired by 1937 U.S. Triple Crown champion War Admiral, a son of Man o' War, who was ranked No. 1 in the Blood-Horse magazine list of the top 100 U.S. Thoroughbred champions of the 20th Century.

He was trained by former jockey Andy Schuttinger.

== Racing career ==
Blue Peter was sent to the track in 1948 at age two. That year, he compiled a record of eight wins and two thirds from ten starts, with several of his wins coming in the premier events against the best horses in his age group such as the Belmont Futurity Stakes, and the Hopeful Stakes. The colt's performances earned him American Champion Two-Year-Old Colt honors.

Blue Peter did not race again and he died at age four of an illness at the Aiken Training Track on January 12, 1950.

== Honors ==
In 1977, his racing career was honored with an induction in the Aiken Thoroughbred Racing Hall of Fame.

== Pedigree ==
Pedigree of Blue Peter
Sire War Admiral 1934	Man o' War 1917	Fair Play	Hastings
Sire War Admiral 1934	Man o' War 1917	Fair Play	Fairy Gold
Sire War Admiral 1934	Man o' War 1917	Mahubah	Rock Sand
Sire War Admiral 1934	Man o' War 1917	Mahubah	Merry Token
Sire War Admiral 1934	Brushup 1929	Sweep	Ben Brush
Sire War Admiral 1934	Brushup 1929	Sweep	Pink Domino
Sire War Admiral 1934	Brushup 1929	Annette K.	Harry of Hereford
Sire War Admiral 1934	Brushup 1929	Annette K.	Bathing Girl
Dam Carillon 1939	Case Ace 1934	Teddy	Ajax
Dam Carillon 1939	Case Ace 1934	Teddy	Rondeau
Dam Carillon 1939	Case Ace 1934	Sweetheart	Ultimus
Dam Carillon 1939	Case Ace 1934	Sweetheart	Humanity
Dam Carillon 1939	Sunfeathers 1934	Sun Briar	Sundridge
Dam Carillon 1939	Sunfeathers 1934	Sun Briar	Sweet Briar
Dam Carillon 1939	Sunfeathers 1934	Angry Plume	Mad Hatter
Dam Carillon 1939	Sunfeathers 1934	Angry Plume	Burgee
