= John Bejshak =

Canadian jockey (1909–1969)

Personal information
- Born: September 19, 1909 Montreal, Quebec; Canada
- Died: December 26, 1969 (aged 60) Towson, Maryland; United States
- Resting place: Salisbury IOOF Cemetery, Salisbury, Pennsylvania
- Occupation: Jockey

Horse racing career
- Sport: Horse racing
- Career wins: Not found

Major racing wins
- Astoria Stakes (1929); Fall Highweight Handicap (1930); Toboggan Handicap (1930); Rowe Memorial Handicap (1932); Fall Championship Stakes (1933); Brooklyn Handicap (1934, 1935); Potomac Handicap (1934); Butler Handicap (1935); Wilson Stakes (1935, 1936); Whitney Handicap (1935, 1936); Arlington Handicap (1935); Hawthorne Gold Cup Handicap (1935); Merchants and Citizens Handicap (1935); Stars and Stripes Handicap (1935); Saratoga Handicap (1936); Santa Barbara Handicap (1936); San Carlos Handicap (1936)

Significant horses
- Discovery, Pomponius

John Joseph Bejshak (September 19, 1909 – December 26, 1969) was a Canadian-born jockey who competed in American Thoroughbred horse racing best known as the rider of 1935 American Horse of the Year, Discovery.

Bejshak was hired by prominent Canadian horseman J. K. L. Ross who brought him to work at his Maryland breeding farm. His contract was sold to Alfred G. Vanderbilt II where he would meet his future father-in-law, trainer Bud Stotler, whose clients included Vanderbilt and William R. Coe. In 1933 Bejshak rode Coe's colt Pomponius to a fifth-place finish in the Kentucky Derby and to a fourth in the Preakness Stakes. For Vanderbilt and his Sagamore Stable, Bejshak was aboard Discovery for most of his races between 1934 and 1936, winning major handicaps from New York City to Detroit and Chicago and in California.

Plagued by weight gain, Bejshak's career was cut short. He retired from riding in 1936 and in the 1940s went to work for Laurel Park as custodian of the jockey quarters, patrol judge, clerk of scales, and placing judge. He died of a heart attack in 1969 at age sixty.
