= Twin City Handicap =

- Class: Discontinued stakes
- Location: Belmont Park; Elmont, New York, United States
- Inaugurated: 1884–1930
- Race type: Thoroughbred – Flat racing

Race information
- Distance: 1 1/4 miles (10 furlongs)
- Surface: Dirt
- Track: left-handed
- Qualification: Three-years-old and up

The Twin City Handicap was an American Thoroughbred horse race first run in 1884 at Sheepshead Bay Race Track in Sheepshead Bay, New York where it continued annually through 1909. Following passage by the New York State Legislature of the Hart–Agnew Law anti-wagering bill that resulted in the closure of all racetracks in the state of New York. The devastation to the horse racing industry was such that the Sheepshead Bay Race Track never reopened. On September 2, 1909 Olambala won what would prove to be the final running of the Twin City Handicap at the Sheepshead Bay track.

In 1917 the Coney Island Jockey Club, operators of the Sheepshead Bay Race Track, transferred their race titles to The Jockey Club. As a result, in 1924 Belmont Park revived the Twin City Handicap. Won by Spot Cash, the first event at Belmont Park was run on a track made sloppy by a heavy rainstorm that the jockeys and their horses had to endure. Although the next few years saw the race continue to attract top level runners, the Wall Street Crash of October 29, 1929 and ensuing Great Depression brought further setbacks to horse racing and the race would be canceled. The final running of the Twin City Handicap took place on September 11, 1930, when future U.S. Racing Hall of Fame inductee Raymond Workman guided James Butler's three-year-old colt Questionnaire to a two-length victory while being eased up.

== Records ==
Speed record:

- 2:02 4/5 – 1 1/4 miles on dirt: Questionnaire (1930)

Most wins:

- 3 – Exile (1888, 1889)

Most wins by a jockey:

- 5 – Anthony Hamilton (1886, 1888, 1889, 1892, 1894)

Most wins by a trainer:

- 2 – Green B. Morris (1885, 1891)
- 2 – William Lakeland (1888, 1889)
- 2 – John Rogers (1892, 1894)
- 2 – James G. Rowe Sr. (1896, 1905)
- 2 – Frank M. Taylor (1903, 1907)

Most wins by an owner:

- 2 – Green B. Morris (1885, 1891)
- 2 – William Lakeland (1888, 1889)
- 2 – Lucky Baldwin (1893, 1895)

== Winners ==
Year	Winner	Age	Jockey	Trainer	Owner	Dist. (Furlongs)	Time	Win $
1930	Questionnaire	3	Raymond Workman	Andy Schuttinger	James Butler	10 F	2:02.80	$3,875
1929	Petee-Wrack	4	Steve O'Donnell	William M. Booth	John R. Macomber	10 F	2:03.60	$4,173
1928	Sortie	2	George Schreiner	Max Hirsch	Charles Schwartz	10 F	2:04.60	$4,550
1927	Whiskery	3	Raymond Workman	Fred Hopkins	Harry Payne Whitney	10 F	2:04.00	$4,925
1926	Black Maria	3	Laverne Fator	William H. Karrick	William R. Coe	10 F	2:02.80	$4,575
1925	Aga Khan	4	Earl Sande	James E. Fitzsimmons	Belair Stud	10 F	2:04.00	$5,200
1924	Spot Cash	4	Edward Scobie	James W. Healy	Albert C. Bostwick Jr.	10 F	2:05.60	$5,850
1910	– 1923	Race not held						
1909	Olambala	3	James Butwell	T. J. Healey	Montpelier Stable	10 F	2:05.00	$2,300
1908	Dorante	3	James Lee	Raleigh Colston	Fred A. Forsythe	10 F	2:03.40	$2,300
1907	Nealon	4	Willie Knapp	Frank M. Taylor	Patchogue Stable (William DuBois)	10 F	2:05.60	$12,800
1906	Fine Cloth	3	Guy Garner	Barry D. Wood	Thomas L. Watt	10 F	2:07.00	$14,055
1905	Wild Mint	3	David Nicol	James G. Rowe Sr.	James R. Keene	10 F	2:06.80	$6,122
1904	Caughnawaga	5	Tommy Burns	Hubert H. Hyner	John Sanford	10 F	2:05.00	$12,400
1903	McChesney	4	Grover Fuller	Frank M. Taylor	Edward E. Smathers	10 F	2:04.60	$6,250
1902	Gunfire	3	Harry Cochran	John E. Madden	William C. Whitney	10 F	2:05.20	$6,000
1901	Herbert	4	Lewis Smith	Walter C. Rollins	Walter C. Rollins	10 F	2:07.00	$5,300
1900	Ethelbert	4	Henry Spencer	A. Jack Joyner	Perry Belmont & Anthony L. Aste	10 F	2:07.00	$4,600
1899	Previous	4	Winfield O'Connor	Julius Bauer	Bromley & Co. (Joseph E. Bromley & Arthur Featherstone)	10 F	2:10.00	$5,050
1898	The Friar	4	Fred Littlefield	R. Wyndham Walden	Alfred H. & Dave H. Morris	10 F	2:07.40	$3,850
1897	Ornament	3	Fred Taral	Charles T. Patterson	Charles T. Patterson	10 F	2:05.40	$3,850
1896	Requital	3	Alonzo Clayton	James G. Rowe Sr.	Brookdale Stable	10 F	2:10.20	$1,675
1895	Rey El Santa Anita	4	Fred Taral	Henry McDaniel	Lucky Baldwin	10 F	2:07.00	$1,635
1894	Dorian	3	Anthony Hamilton	John W. Rogers	John W. Rogers	10 F	2:08.20	$2,475
1893	Galindo	4	E. Morris	Dow L. Williams	Lucky Baldwin	10 F	2:09.00	$2,580
1892	Lamplighter	3	Anthony Hamilton	John Huggins	Pierre Lorillard IV	10 F	2:09.20	$7,350
1891	Strathmeath	3	George Covington	Green B. Morris	Green B. Morris	10 F	2:10.60	$3,390
1890	Firenze	6	Edward Garrison	Matthew Byrnes	James Ben Ali Haggin	10 F	2:07.00	$3,735
1889	Exile	7	Anthony Hamilton	William Lakeland	William Lakeland	10 F	2:09.80	$4,725
1888	Exile	6	Anthony Hamilton	William Lakeland	William Lakeland	10 F	2:08.00	$4,460
1887	Elkwood	4	William J. Fitzpatrick	James B. Dyer	Walter Gratz	10 F	2:08.00	$4,420
1886	Louisette	5	Anthony Hamilton		Locust Stable	10 F	2:12.25	$4,245
1885	Bersan	3	William J. Fitzpatrick	Green B. Morris	Green B. Morris & James D. Patton	10 F	2:12.50	$4,402
1884	Tom Martin	3	George Church		Peter C. Fox	10 F	2:10.25	$4,367
