= Vito (horse) =

American-bred Thoroughbred racehorse

- Sire: Negofol
- Grandsire: Childwick
- Dam: Forever
- Damsire: Ballot
- Sex: Stallion
- Foaled: 1925; Kentucky, US
- Country: United States
- Color: Bay
- Breeder: Alfred H. Cosden
- Owner: Alfred H. Cosden
- Trainer: Max Hirsch
- Record: 18: 6-3-2
- Earnings: US$82,330

Major wins
- Grand Union Hotel Stakes (1927) U.S. Triple Crown series: Belmont Stakes (1928)

Vito (foaled 1925) was an American Thoroughbred racehorse best known for winning the 1928 Belmont Stakes, the third and oldest leg of the U.S. Triple Crown series. Bred and raced by Alfred H. Cosden, he was sired by Negofol, a French colt owned by American William K. Vanderbilt, who won the 1909 French Derby. His dam was Forever, a daughter of two-time American Champion Older Male Horse Ballot.

Vito was conditioned for racing by future U.S. Racing Hall of Fame inductee Max Hirsch. As a two-year-old, Vito won the prestigious Grand Union Hotel Stakes at Saratoga Race Course.
