= Butler Handicap =

American Thoroughbred horse race

- Class: Discontinued stakes
- Location: Empire City Race Track, Yonkers, New York (1935-1942); Jamaica Race Course, Jamaica, New York (1943-1953)
- Inaugurated: 1935-1953
- Race type: Thoroughbred - Flat racing

Race information
- Distance: 11/16 M
- Surface: Dirt
- Track: left-handed
- Qualification: Three-years-old and up

The Butler Handicap was an American Thoroughbred horse race first run at Empire City Race Track in Yonkers, New York in 1935 as the Butler Memorial Handicap. The race was named in honor of Empire City Race Track owner James Butler who had died in 1934. Due to wartime rationing regulations, in 1943 the race was moved to Jamaica Race Course in Jamaica, New York and would remain there until its cancellation in 1953.

== Historical notes ==
The 1935 inaugural Butler Memorial was won by future U.S. Racing Hall of Fame inductee Discovery. He was owned by Alfred Vanderbilt Jr. who would win this race three times, the most by an owner in its history. Other Butler Handicap winning horses who went on to have Hall of Fame careers were Assault, Seabiscuit, and Stymie.

In 1942, Tola Rose pulled off a major upset in front of more than 34,000 racing fans when he beat 1941 U.S. Triple Crown winner Whirlaway by four lengths. The win by Tola Rose set a new Empire City track record in what would prove to be the last time the race would be run at that facility.

Hall of Fame jockey Johnny Longden won the 1944 Butler Handicap while riding with a broken foot and a back with two broken vertebrae. When Longden finally went to see a doctor about his extreme pain he was told he might never ride again. Six months later he was back in the saddle.

Lucky Draw's win in the 1946 edition of the Butler Handicap marked the first of six track records he would set that year.

The final running of the Butler Handicap took place on November 14, 1953 and was won by Quiet Step, a horse ridden by future Hall of Fame inductee Ted Atkinson for owner Bernard Heiman's Apheim Stable and trainer Kay Jensen.

== Records ==
Speed record:

- 1:55.00 - Loser Weeper (1950) @ 13/16 miles

Most wins:

- No horse ever won this race more than once.

Most wins by a jockey:

- 2 - Nick Wall (1938, 1939)
- 2 - Robert Permane (1945, 1948)
- 2 - Hedley Woodhouse (1946, 1952)

Most wins by a trainer:

- 2 - Bud Stotler (1935, 1936)
- 2 - Max Hirsch (1942, 1947)

Most wins by an owner:

- 3 - Alfred G. Vanderbilt Jr. (1935, 1936, 1950)

== Winners ==
Year	Winner	Age	Jockey	Trainer	Owner	Dist. (Miles)	Time
1953	Quiet Step	4	Ted Atkinson	Kay Jensen	Apheim Stable (Bernard H. Heiman)	13/16 M	1:57.80
1952	Marcador	3	Hedley Woodhouse	Norman R. McLeod	Saxon Stable (Max Prestridge & Riley Allison)	13/16 M	1:56.00
1951	Oil Capitol	4	Lois C. Cook	Harry Trotsek	Hasty House Farm & Cora M. Trotsek	13/16 M	1:56.80
1950	Loser Weeper	5	Eric Guerin	Carey Winfrey	Alfred G. Vanderbilt Jr.	13/16 M	1:55.00
1949	Conniver	5	Arnold Kirkland	William Post	Harry La Montagne	13/16 M	1:57.20
1948	Donor	4	Robert Permane	George P. (Maj) Odom	W. Deering Howe	13/16 M	1:58.00
1947	Assault	4	Eddie Arcaro	Max Hirsch	King Ranch	13/16 M	1:56.60
1946	Lucky Draw	5	Hedley Woodhouse	Bert Mulholland	George D. Widener Jr.	13/16 M	1:55.20
1945	Stymie	4	Robert Permane	Hirsch Jacobs	Ethel D. Jacobs	13/16 M	1:56.60
1944	First Fiddle	5	Johnny Longden	Edward L. Mulrenan	Edward L. Mulrenan	13/16 M	1:56.00
1943	Thumbs Up	4	Otto Grohs	Carl A. Roles	Louis B. Mayer	13/16 M	1:56.20
1942	Tola Rose	5	Warren Mehrtens	Max Hirsch	Arthur J. Sackett	13/16 M	1:56.80
1941	Foxbrough	5	James Stout	James E. Fitzsimmons	Belair Stud	13/16 M	1:58.20
1940	Can't Wait	5	Basil James	J. Thomas Taylor	Myron Selznick	13/16 M	1:57.60
1939	Lovely Night	3	Nick Wall	Henry McDaniel	Florence L. Clark	13/16 M	1:57.40
1938	Esposa	6	Nick Wall	Matthew P. Brady	Middleburg Stable	13/16 M	1:57.60
1937	Seabiscuit	4	Red Pollard	Tom Smith	Charles S. Howard	13/16 M	1:58.60
1936	Good Gamble	4	Lee Fallon	Bud Stotler	Alfred G. Vanderbilt Jr.	13/16 M	1:58.20
1935	Discovery	4	John Bejshak	Bud Stotler	Alfred G. Vanderbilt Jr.	11/8 M	1:53.00
