= Tola Rose =

Thoroughbred racehorse

- Sire: Head Play
- Grandsire: My Play
- Dam: June Rose
- Damsire: Myram
- Sex: Stallion
- Foaled: 1937
- Country: United States
- Colour: Bay
- Breeder: Suzanne Burnett Mason
- Owner: Arthur J. Sackett
- Trainer: Max Hirsch
- Record: 76: 16-13-8
- Earnings: US$96,825

Major wins
- Questionnaire Handicap (1940); Butler Memorial Handicap (1942); Havre de Grace Handicap (1942); Bowie Handicap (1944)

Tola Rose (foaled 1937 in Kentucky) was an American Thoroughbred racehorse who won several stakes races in his career but is best remembered for easily defeating U.S. Triple Crown winner Whirlaway in the 1942 running of the Butler Memorial Handicap. Ridden by Warren Mehrtens in front of a record crowd at Empire City Race Track, Tola Rose won by four lengths and did it in track record time. A year earlier, Tola Rose had finished second in the 1941 Butler Memorial to Belair Stud's Foxbrough.

Tola Rose was owned by Arthur J. Sackett who had been appointed President and Chairman of Mason & Hanger‐Silas Mason Company, Inc. succeeding Silas B. Mason, a fellow horse racing enthusiast who owned and bred Thoroughbreds.

Tola Rose was race-conditioned by future U.S. Racing Hall of Fame trainer, Max Hirsch.

== Pedigree ==
Pedigree of Tola Rose, bay horse, 1937
Sire Head Play	My Play	Fair Play	Hastings
Sire Head Play	My Play	Fair Play	Fairy Gold
Sire Head Play	My Play	Mahubah	Rock Sand
Sire Head Play	My Play	Mahubah	Merry Token
Sire Head Play	Red Head	King Gorin	Transvaal
Sire Head Play	Red Head	King Gorin	Ethel Simpson
Sire Head Play	Red Head	Pimenta	Light Brigade
Sire Head Play	Red Head	Pimenta	Allspice
Dam June Rose	Myram	Flying Fox	Orme
Dam June Rose	Myram	Flying Fox	Vampire
Dam June Rose	Myram	Airs and Graces	Ayrshire
Dam June Rose	Myram	Airs and Graces	Lady Alwyne
Dam June Rose	Pietra	Pietermaritzburg	St. Simon
Dam June Rose	Pietra	Pietermaritzburg	Sea Air
Dam June Rose	Pietra	Brian-Root	Springfield
Dam June Rose	Pietra	Brian-Root	Eglentyne (family: 2-o)
