= Earl Sande =

American jockey and horse trainer (1898–1968)

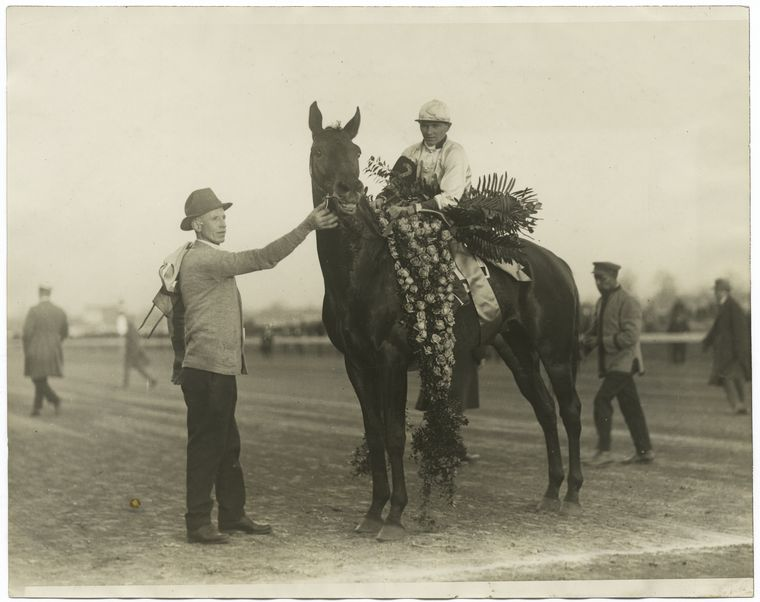
- Sande aboard champion Zev

Personal information
- Born: November 13, 1898 Groton, South Dakota
- Died: August 19, 1968 (aged 69) Jacksonville, Oregon
- Resting place: Belcrest Memorial Park, Salem, Oregon
- Occupation: Jockey / Trainer

Horse racing career
- Sport: Horse racing
- Career wins: 968

Major racing wins
- Dixie Handicap (1918); Sanford Stakes (1918); Black-Eyed Susan Stakes (1919); Kenner Stakes (1919); Merchants and Citizens Handicap (1919); Philadelphia Handicap (1919); Bowie Handicap (1920, 1921, 1923); Clark Handicap (1920); Connaught Cup Handicap (1920); Delaware Handicap (1920); Fall Highweight Handicap (1920, 1923); Ladies Handicap (1920); Saratoga Handicap (1920, 1924, 1927, 1928); Coaching Club American Oaks (1921, 1928); Dwyer Stakes (1921, 1926, 1930); Jockey Club Gold Cup (1921, 1922, 1927, 1930); Keene Memorial Stakes (1921); Metropolitan Handicap; Empire City Derby (1922, 1932) (1921, 1922, 1923); Lawrence Realization Stakes (1922, 1923, 1930); Pierrepont Handicap (1922); Stuyvesant Handicap (1922, 1923); Spinaway Stakes (1922); Alabama Stakes (1923); Brooklyn Handicap (1923, 1938); Champagne Stakes (1923); Edgemere Handicap (1923); Fashion Stakes (1923); Gazelle Handicap (1923); Manhattan Handicap (1923); Saratoga Cup (1923, 1930); Saratoga Special Stakes (1923, 1925, 1926); Suburban Handicap (1923, 1924, 1930); Toboggan Handicap (1923, 1927, 1928); Carter Handicap (1924, 1928); Tremont Stakes (1924, 1927); Fleetwing Handicap (1925, 1932); Great American Stakes (1925); Twin City Handicap (1925); Havre de Grace Cup Handicap (1926); Huron Handicap (1926); National Stallion Stakes (1926, 1927); Potomac Handicap (1926); Jerome Handicap (1927); Saranac Handicap (1927); American Legion Handicap (1928); Wood Memorial Stakes (1930); Santa Anita Derby (1938); Blue Grass Stakes (1937, 1939) American Classics wins: Kentucky Derby (1923, 1925, 1930); Preakness Stakes (1930); Belmont Stakes (1921, 1923, 1924, 1927, 1930); United States Triple Crown (1930)

Racing awards
- United States Champion Jockey by earnings (1921, 1923, 1927); U.S. Champion Trainer by earnings (1938)

Honors
- United States Racing Hall of Fame (1955); Fair Grounds Racing Hall of Fame (1971)

Significant horses
- Chance Play, Chance Shot, Crusader, Gallant Fox, Grey Lag, Mad Play, Mad Hatter, Sarazen, Sir Barton, Stagehand, Zev, Billy Kelly, Cudgel, Milkmaid
- Updated on October 30, 2021

Earl Harold Sande (November 13, 1898 – August 19, 1968) was an American Hall of Fame jockey and thoroughbred horse trainer.

== Early life in South Dakota ==
Born in Groton, South Dakota, Earl Sande started out as a bronco buster in the early 1900s but then became a successful American quarter horse rider before switching to thoroughbred horse racing in 1918.

== Career ==
Sande joined Cal Shilling and Johnny Loftus as a contract rider for Commander J. K. L. Ross. In 1919, he tied an American record with six wins on a single racecard at Havre de Grace Racetrack. He went on to ride for noted owners such as Harry F. Sinclair, and Samuel D. Riddle and was the leading money-winning jockey in the United States in 1921, 1923, and again in 1927. He won both the Belmont Stakes five times and the Jockey Club Gold Cup on four occasions, the Kentucky Derby three times and the Preakness Stakes once. In 1923, he won 39 stakes races for Harry F. Sinclair's Rancocas Stable, ten of which were on ultimate Horse of the Year winner Zev, including the Kentucky Derby, Belmont Stakes, and a match race against England's Epsom Derby winner Papyrus. Sande's most famous wins came aboard Gallant Fox in 1930 when he won the U.S. Triple Crown.

Sande's fame was such that he was immortalized in a number of poems by Damon Runyon.

== Retirement ==
Following his retirement in 1932, Earl Sande remained in the industry as a trainer. In 1938 he was the United States' leading trainer and by the mid-1940s owned and operated his own racing stable.

In 1955, Earl Sande was inducted into the National Museum of Racing and Hall of Fame. His life story was told in the 2004 book by Richard J. Maturi titled "Triple Crown Winner: The Earl Sande Saga" (ISBN 0-9607298-5-2).

Earl Sande died in 1968 in a Jacksonville, Oregon nursing home.
