= Alfred M. Robertson =

American jockey (1911–1975)

Alfred Robertson
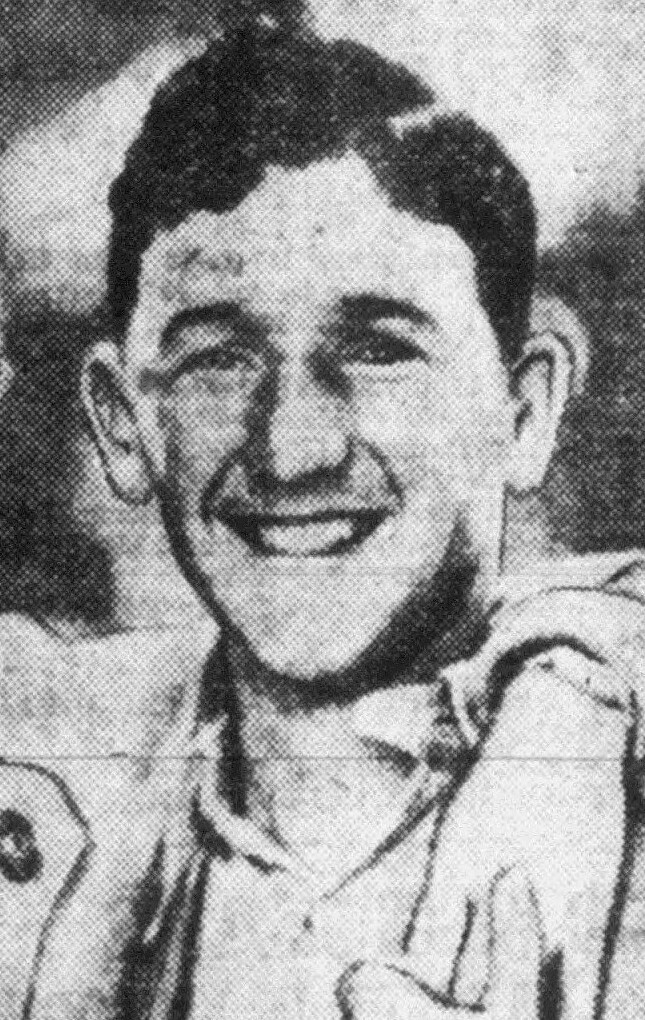
- Robertson, circa 1933

Personal information
- Born: October 20, 1911 Aberdeen, Scotland
- Died: September 4, 1975 (aged 63) Hialeah, Florida, United States
- Occupation: Jockey

Horse racing career
- Sport: Horse racing
- Career wins: 1,856

Major racing wins
- Pimlico Cup (1928); National Stallion Stakes (1929); Travers Stakes (1929, 1941); Black-Eyed Susan Stakes (1930, 1931); Havre de Grace Cup Handicap (1930); Mount Vernon Handicap (1930); Oakdale Handicap (1930); Potomac Handicap (1930); Arlington Classic (1931); Arlington-Washington Lassie Stakes (1931); Keene Memorial Stakes (1931); Suburban Handicap (1931); Aberdeen Stakes (1931); Astoria Stakes (1932); Bowie Handicap (1932); Demoiselle Stakes (1932); Pierrepont Handicap (1932); Youthful Stakes (1932, 1941); Remsen Stakes (1933, 1940); San Carlos Handicap (1935); San Gabriel Handicap (1935); San Felipe Stakes (1936); Hopeful Stakes (1937); Washington Park Futurity (1937); Arkansas Derby (1938); Edgemere Handicap (1938); Jerome Handicap (1938); Matron Stakes (1938); Spinaway Stakes (1938); American Derby (1941); Bahamas Stakes (1941); Peter Pan Stakes (1941); Questionnaire Handicap (1941); Saranac Stakes (1941); Saratoga Special Stakes (1941); Tremont Stakes (1941); Daingerfield Handicap (1942); Diana Handicap (1942)

Honours
- United States Racing Hall of Fame (1971)

Significant horses
- Top Flight, Case Ace, Whirlaway, Mate, Menow, Edith Cavell, Questionnaire
- Updated on August 5, 2008

Alfred Masson Robertson (October 20, 1911 – September 4, 1975) was a Hall of Fame jockey in American Thoroughbred horse racing.

Robertson was born in Aberdeen, Scotland, the son of Georgina Watson and her husband Ross Robertson. The Robertson family emigrated to the United States when Alfred was young. His father became a Thoroughbred racehorse owner/trainer and Alfred began his professional career in 1927 riding for his father. Alfred's mother's family emigrated to Toronto, Ontario, Canada, and her brother, Alexander Watson, was also involved in Thoroughbred racing. Alexander's son, Bobby Watson, was a Canadian Horse Racing Hall of Fame jockey who "absolutely dominated horse racing in Ontario in the 1940s".

Alfred Robertson rode for several top American stables including those of the Whitney family, Ethel V. Mars, Isabel Dodge Sloane and for Calumet Farm he rode U.S. Triple Crown champion Whirlaway to victories in the American Derby, Lawrence Realization Stakes, and the Travers Stakes. Twice during his career he rode six winners in a single day. The first happened in 1928 at Oriental Park Racetrack in Marianao, Havana, Cuba, then in 1941 in the United States at Jamaica Race Course in Jamaica, New York. Remarkably, his six wins at the Jamaica Race Course were all aboard long shots.

The winner of a number of important races at tracks across the United States, Robertson had seven mounts in the Kentucky Derby with his best finish a third in 1937. He competed twice in the Preakness Stakes, finishing third on Snowflake in 1930 and second in 1932 on Tick On. He rode the colt Robert Morris to a win in the Peter Pan Stakes and ran second in the 1941 Belmont Stakes.

Robertson was one of the founding members of the Jockeys' Guild on its formation in 1940. In 1942 he was named best rider by the New York Turf Writers' Association. He retired from competitive riding the following year and in 1971 his career was honored with induction in the National Museum of Racing and Hall of Fame.

Alfred Robertson died in 1975 at age sixty-three in Hialeah, Florida. His grandson, Mark Robertson, is a graduate of the Juilliard School and a noted musician, producer and concertmaster. His granddaughter Kathryn Woolley is a violinist in the Cincinnati Symphony Orchestra.
