= Roamer (horse) =

American-bred Thoroughbred racehorse

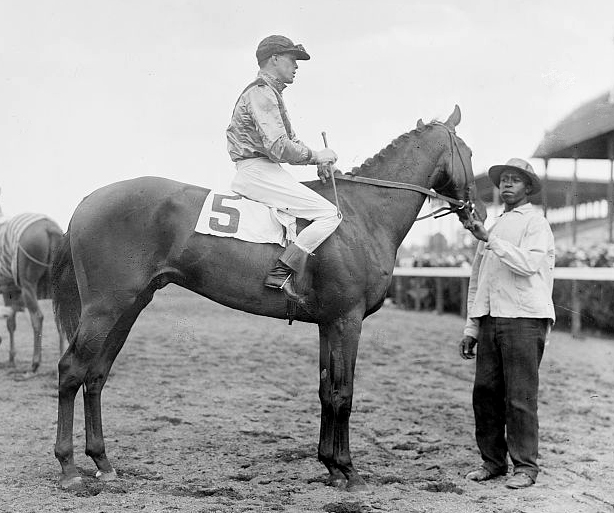
- Roamer mounted by Thomas McTaggart in 1913
- Sire: Knight Errant
- Grandsire: Trenton
- Dam: Rose Tree II
- Damsire: Bona Vista
- Sex: Gelding
- Foaled: 1911
- Country: United States
- Colour: Bay
- Breeder: Runnymede Farm (Clay Brothers)
- Owner: The Clay Brothers; Andrew Miller
- Trainer: A. J. Goldsborough
- Record: 98: 39-26-9
- Earnings: $98,828

Major wins
- Saratoga Special Stakes (1913); Carter Handicap (1914); Brooklyn Derby (1914); Huron Handicap (1914); Midsummer Stakes (1914); Municipal Handicap (1914); Travers Stakes (1914); Washington Handicap (1914); Brookdale Handicap (1915); Havre de Grace Handicap (1915); Merchants and Citizens Handicap (1915); Queens County Handicap (1915, 1918); Saratoga Cup (1915); Saratoga Handicap (1915, 1917, 1918); Excelsior Handicap (1917); Empire City Handicap (1918); Mount Vernon Handicap (1918); Pierrepont Handicap (1918); Against time for a mile (1918); Against time for a mile 1/4 (1918)

Awards
- American Horse of the Year (1914); American Champion Older Male Horse (1915, 1916)

Honours
- United States Racing Hall of Fame (1981) #99 - Top 100 U.S. Racehorses of the 20th Century; Roamer Handicap at Aqueduct Racetrack

Roamer (1911–1920) was a champion American Thoroughbred racehorse who was ranked #99 in the Blood-Horse magazine's list of the Top 100 Racehorses of the 20th Century.

== Background ==
Roamer was bred in Kentucky by the sons of Colonel Ezekiel Clay of Runnymede Farm, who had raced some of the best of American racehorses in the 19th century; Hall of Famer Ben Brush who won the 1896 Kentucky Derby; Hall of Famer Hanover who was the Leading sire in North America four times, Runneymede who was second in the 1882 Kentucky Derby behind Apollo, and Hall of Famer Miss Woodford who won 16 consecutive races and was the first American horse to earn over $100,000.

Roamer's father was a teaser stallion named Knight Errant who jumped a fence to get at Rose Tree II, a blind English-bred claiming mare, hence the name of the unexpected ill-bred foal, Roamer. Roamer was a small bay colt born in 1911 who was gelded almost immediately.

== Racing career ==
Roamer raced for the Clay brothers as a two-year-old. One of the brothers entered him in a $1,000 selling race, only to see him claimed, and had to buy him back for $2,005. He was then sold for $2,500 to New York City publisher Andrew Miller, the secretary/treasurer of Saratoga. (Miller, one of the founders of Life magazine, was a classmate of Teddy Roosevelt at Harvard, and in 1900 helped purchase and revive the Saratoga Race Course.) At that point, Roamer's training was taken over by A. J. Goldsborough.

He could run short races, and long. Any surface suited him. He carried up to 133 pounds and broke more track records than any other American racehorse up to his time. Roamer could carry his early speed. Descriptions of many of his races say that he "cantered home" or "won easing up." At the ages of three and four, he was the undisputed champion.

He won the Saratoga Special Stakes, the Carter Handicap (against older horses and setting a track record), the Brooklyn Derby (an 8 length rout), the Midsummer Stakes, the Travers Stakes (a ten length romp while setting another record), the Huron Handicap, the State Fair Stakes, the Municipal Handicap, the Autumn WFA Stakes, the Washington Handicap at Laurel Park Racecourse (giving away 22 pounds to the runner-up and breaking the American 9-furlong record), the Queens County Handicap (twice), the Brookdale Handicap (twice), the Saratoga Handicap (3 times), the Merchants and Citizens Handicap, the Saratoga Cup, the Havre de Grace Handicap, the National Handicap, the Yonkers Handicap (twice), the Excelsior Handicap, the Aqueduct Handicap, the Arlington Handicap, the Empire City Handicap, the Mount Vernon Handicap, the Pierrepont Handicap, the Edgemere Handicap, and an Overnight 'cap as an 8-year-old, beating the French champion Sun Briar, Roamer's final career win. He also finished ahead of another Hall of Famer, Old Rosebud, in the Yonkers Handicap, placing second in his final start ever.

As his career progressed, Roamer was required to carry more and more weight. In August 1918, at the age of seven, he attempted to beat the great Salvator's 1890 record mile of 1:35 1/4, which was set on a straight course. He came under the wire in 1:34 4/5 on a track with two turns. (Fifty years later, in 1968, Dr. Fager set a new mark of 1:32 1/5 around one turn at Arlington Park. This record stood for over thirty years.)

In 1914, he was the track's leading earner and was named America's Horse of the Year.

Roamer made 98 starts over 7 years, and won 39 of them and finished second in 26 of them. His career earnings were $98,828.

== Retirement ==
Roamer died on the first day of the year 1920. On that New Year's Eve, his owner Andrew Miller suffered a fatal heart attack. A few hours later, Roamer slipped on ice in his paddock and broke his leg. He had to be euthanized.

His jockey for the last three years of his life, Andy Schuttinger, said, "He is as smart as they come, but is as honest as the day is long. He will give up to the last ounce of speed he has on tap."

"His action is what makes him great," said his trainer. "I never expect to see another like him."

Roamer was inducted into the National Museum of Racing and Hall of Fame in Saratoga Springs, New York, in 1981.
