= Mary Hirsch =

American racehorse trainer

Mary Hirsch McLennan (born c. 1913–1976) was an American trainer of thoroughbred racehorses. In 1935 at age 22, Hirsch became the first woman to be granted a trainer's license in the United States. In 1937, she became the first woman to saddle a horse for the Kentucky Derby. In her later life, she bred racehorses at her farm in Maryland, including stakes winner, Royal J.D.

== Early life ==
Mary Hirsch was born in 1913. Hirsch grew up on the grounds of Belmont Park, where her father worked as a trainer. Hirsch was the daughter of Max Hirsch, a racehorse trainer who would be inducted into the National Museum of Racing and Hall of Fame in 1959. Her brother, Buddy also became a racehorse trainer.

In her youth, she learned to ride and work with horses. She apprenticed with her father and began to train a small string of horses. Before she was granted a license, Mary would handle all of the race day preparation of the horses, but was not permitted to race under her own name. Mary was unable to get credit for her work, and her horses would run under her fathers, or brother's name.

== Trainer's license ==
In 1933, Mary Hirsch requested a training license from the New York jockey club. New York's regulatory body put her application on hold, so Mary successfully pursued training licenses elsewhere, including Michigan, Illinois, and Florida. On 7 July 1934 Hirsh became the first woman granted a trainer's license in the United States, when she received her license in Illinois. Hirsch sent out her first runner, Tartan Betsy, at Arlington Heights race track on July 11, 1934.

In 1935, Hirsch had ten winners, and in 1936, she had 17 wins. After saddling her first winner in Florida, Captain Argo, Hirsch successfully petitioned New York racing officials for a trainer's license. Hirsch was granted a New York trainer's license on April 4, 1935. In 1937, she brought one of her horses, No Sir, to contest the 1937 Kentucky Derby, where she became the first woman to train a horse in the Kentucky Derby. No Sir finished the race 13th.

In 1938, Mary Hirsch won the Travers Stakes with Thanksgiving, a horse that was owned by Anne Corning. Reportedly, track writers erroneously reported that her father Max Hirsch had trained the horse.

== Later life ==
In 1940, Mary Hirsch married racing executive Charles J. McLennan, and retired from training. Hirsch returned to training in 1949 after her children started school.

In her later life, Mary Hirsch McLennan and her husband Charles bred horses at their Welcome Here Farm in Maryland. In 1968 she bred Royal J.D., who would go on to win the 1971 Allegheny Stakes and be named to the 1971 Maryland-bred Thoroughbred Honor Roll of Champions. Her husband Charles McLennan died in 1971. Mary Hirsch McLennan died in 1976.

== Legacy ==
In 2019, Hirsch was featured in a Women in Racing Exhibition at the National Museum of Racing and Hall of Fame.
