= Andy Schuttinger =

American jockey & trainer (1892–1971)

Personal information
- Born: July 13, 1892 Brooklyn, New York
- Died: March 5, 1971 (aged 78) Putnam County, Florida
- Occupation: Jockey / trainer / owner

Horse racing career
- Sport: Horse racing
- Career wins: Not found

Major racing wins
- Champagne Stakes (1916); Champlain Handicap (1916); Metropolitan Handicap (1916); Manhattan Handicap (1916); Paumonok Handicap (1916); Havre de Grace Cup Handicap (1916); Carter Handicap (1917); Excelsior Handicap (1917); Potomac Handicap (1917, 1922); Belmont Futurity Stakes (1918); Fashion Stakes (1918); Hopeful Stakes (1918, 1920); Juvenile Stakes (1918); Oakdale Handicap (1918); Pierrepont Handicap (1918); Brooklyn Handicap (1919); Gazelle Handicap (1919); Saratoga Cup (1919); Suburban Handicap (1920); Travers Stakes (1920); Remsen Stakes (1921); Withers Stakes (1921); Edgemere Handicap (1922); Aberdeen Stakes (1923); Jockey Club Gold Cup (1924) American Classic Race wins: Preakness Stakes (1914) As a trainer: Aqueduct Handicap (1929); Hawthorne Gold Cup Handicap (1929, 1930); New Rochelle Handicap (1929); Empire City Derby (1930); Mount Vernon Handicap (1930); Twin City Handicap (1930); Brooklyn Handicap (1931); Metropolitan Handicap (1931); Philadelphia Handicap (1931); Bay Shore Handicap (1932); Paumonok Handicap (1933, 1951); Gazelle Handicap (1938); Champagne Stakes (1943); Top Flight Handicap (1944); Youthful Stakes (1944, 1949); Dwyer Stakes (1945); Peter Pan Stakes (1945); Belmont Futurity Stakes (1948); Hopeful Stakes (1948); Sapling Stakes (1948); Saratoga Special Stakes (1948); William Penn Stakes (1948); Juvenile Stakes (1949); Jersey Derby (1950); Swift Stakes (1950) As an owner: Bay Shore Handicap (1932); Paumonok Handicap (1933); Merchants and Citizens Handicap (1943); Juvenile Stakes (1949); Jersey Derby (1950); Swift Stakes (1950)

Racing awards
- Leading trainer at Monmouth Park Racetrack (1947)

Significant horses
- As a jockey: Eternal, Holiday, Man o' War, Milkmaid, Old Rosebud, Roamer, The Finn As a trainer: Blue Peter, Sun Beau

Andrew Schuttinger (July 13, 1892 – March 5, 1971) was an American jockey, trainer and owner in the sport of thoroughbred horse racing. A highly successful jockey, Andy Schuttinger won numerous important races including the Travers Stakes, Jockey Club Gold Cup, and what would become the second leg of the U.S. Triple Crown series, the Preakness Stakes. Among the many top horses he rode was Man o' War, as well as two-time American Champion Filly, Milkmaid, the 1914 American Horse of the Year and a Hall of Fame inductee, Roamer, and another Horse of the Year in 1917, Old Rosebud,

== Trainer career ==
Schuttinger announced his retirement from riding on July 20, 1926, advising that he would immediately embark on a career as a trainer with W. T. Anderson's stable based at Saratoga Race Course. In September of the following year he took charge of the racing stable of James Butler, the prominent owner of Empire City Race Track. He remained with Butler until December 24, 1930, and on March 28, 1931, he took over the racing stable of Willis Sharpe Kilmer. Among the horses Schuttinger trained for Kilmer was the U.S. Racing Hall of Fame colt, Sun Beau. He later simultaneously trained horses for Cornelius Vanderbilt Whitney and Joseph M. Roebling.

Also successful as a trainer, Andy Schuttinger and his wife owned and raced horses he trained such as Pilate, Key Ring, Red Welt, Fortification, Fleetborough and probably their best runner, multiple stakes winner, Ferd.

Andy Schuttinger began winding down his racing operations in 1952 and retired from the business. He died in 1971 in Florida at age seventy-eight.
