= Sarazen =

American-bred Thoroughbred racehorse

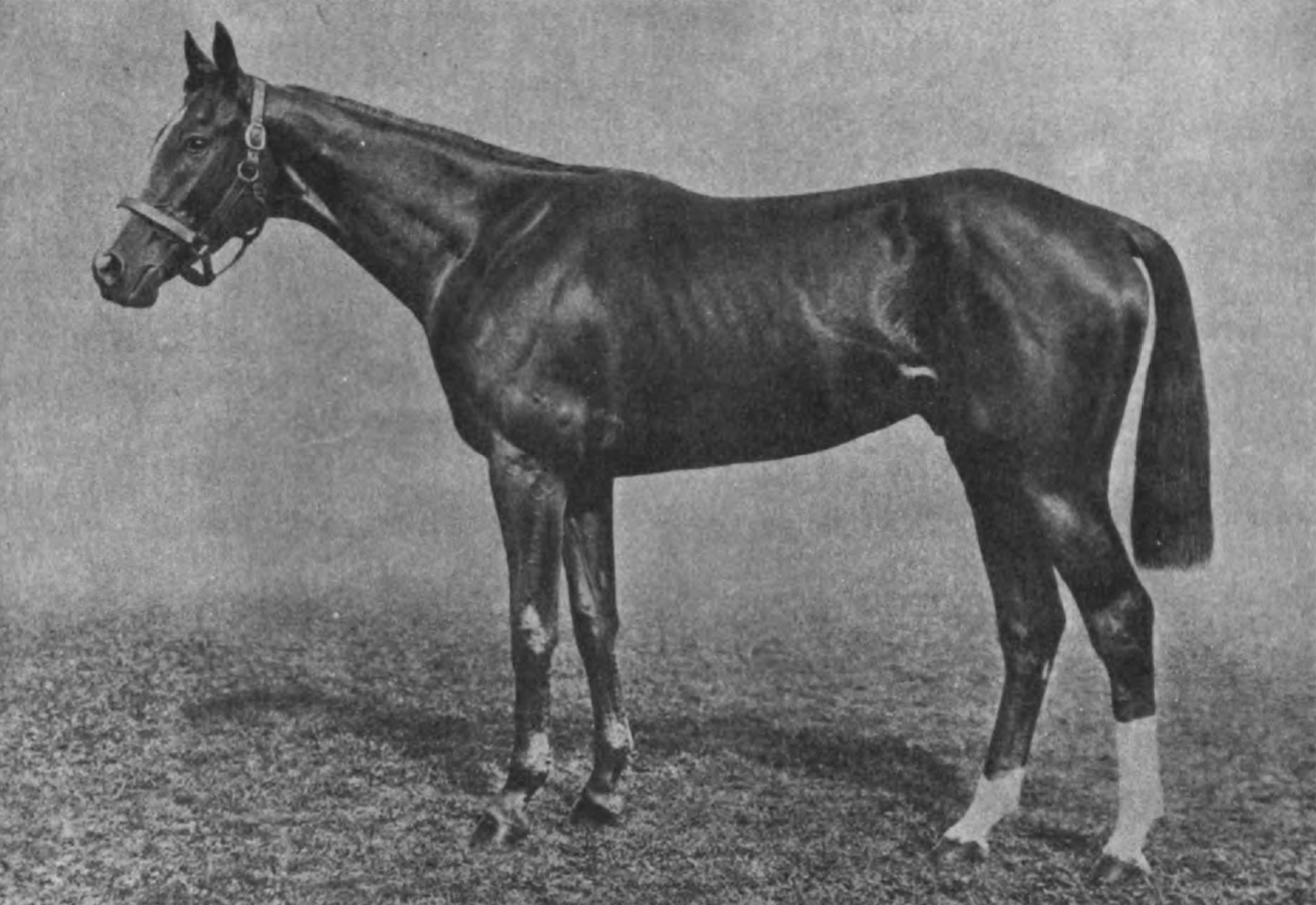
- Sarazen
- Sire: High Time
- Grandsire: Ultimus
- Dam: Rush Box
- Damsire: Box
- Sex: Gelding
- Foaled: 1921
- Country: United States
- Color: Chestnut
- Breeder: Dr. Marius E. Johnston
- Owner: Virginia Fair Vanderbilt
- Trainer: Max Hirsch
- Record: 55: 27-2-6
- Earnings: $225,000

Major wins
- Champagne Stakes (1923); Oakdale Handicap (1923); National Stakes (1923); Laurel Special (1923); Carter Handicap (1924); Manhattan Handicap (1924); Saranac Stakes (1924); International Special No.3 (1924); Averne Handicap (1924, 1925); Fleetwing Handicap (1924, 1925); Dixie Handicap (1925, 1926); Metropolitan Handicap (1926); Mount Vernon Handicap (1926)

Awards
- U.S. Champion 3-Yr-Old Male Horse (1924); U.S. Champion Older Male Horse (1925); United States Horse of the Year (1924, 1925)

Honors
- United States Racing and Hall of Fame (1957) #92 - Top 100 U.S. Racehorses of the 20th Century

Sarazen (1921–1940) was an American Hall of Fame Champion Thoroughbred racehorse. Owned by Colonel Phil T. Chinn's Himyar Stud, Sarazen won his first three starts. Chinn then sold him for a huge profit to Virginia Fair Vanderbilt, who raced him under her Fair Stable banner.

A small horse at fifteen hands tall, Sarazen had a difficult temperament that made him hard to handle, and his original owner had him gelded. After his sale to Fair Stable, Sarazen was trained by Max Hirsch, and he wound up his two-year-old racing season undefeated, capturing all ten races he entered. At age three, health problems saw Sarazen's handlers pass up the U.S. Triple Crown races. When he came back to the track, he dominated racing and earned the first of his two consecutive unofficial United States Horse of the Year awards.

Sarazen's 1925 wins included the Dixie Stakes on Preakness Day on the turf at Pimlico Race Course in Baltimore, Maryland. He also won the International Special No.3 at the Latonia Race Track in Covington, Kentucky, over a field of top American and European horses. While setting a Latonia track record, 3-year-old Sarazen defeated Belmont Stakes winner Mad Play, the future Hall of Fame filly Princess Doreen ("The Princess" came back to beat him in the 1926 Saratoga Handicap), and Pierre Wertheimer's 4-year-old colt Epinard, the champion 2-year-old of France who would retrospectively be named American Champion Older Male Horse.

Sarazen came back the following year and became the only horse to have his name engraved twice on one of the oldest trophies in American sports, "The Annapolis Subscription Plate." The plate is presented to the winner of the Dixie Stakes run at "Old Hilltop" since 1870 (the race was formerly called "The Dinner Party Stakes"). To date, Sarazen is the only repeat winner of the Dixie. He was named Horse of the Year for the second straight time in 1925, winning five of his ten starts.

== Retirement ==
Sarazen was not put out to stud because he had been gelded and could not sire any offspring. He continued to race for another two years but became raucous and unwilling to make much of an effort. He was retired after the 1928 season to Brookdale Farm on Spur Road near Lexington, Kentucky. Sarazen died at age nineteen on December 12, 1940. Following its creation, he was posthumously inducted into the United States' National Museum of Racing and Hall of Fame in 1957.
