= Laverne Fator =

American jockey (1899–1936)

Laverne Andrew Fator
- Laverne Fator, 1918

Personal information
- Born: October 21, 1899 Hailey, Idaho, United States
- Died: May 16, 1936 (aged 36) Jamaica, New York, United States
- Occupation: Jockey

Horse racing career
- Sport: Horse racing
- Career wins: 1,075

Major racing wins
- Edgemere Handicap (1919); Jerome Handicap (1919, 1922); Manhattan Handicap (1919, 1922, 1928); Mount Vernon Handicap (1919); Walden Stakes (1919, 1928); Gazelle Handicap (1920, 1925, 1926); Philadelphia Handicap (1920); Alabama Stakes (1921); Brooklyn Handicap (1921); Champagne Stakes (1921, 1930); Empire City Derby (1921, 1925, 1927); Fleetwing Handicap (1921, 1927); Ladies Handicap (1921, 1926, 1929); Saranac Handicap (1921, 1922); Empire City Handicap (1922, 1925); Saratoga Handicap (1922, 1923); Travers Stakes (1922, 1927); Carter Handicap (1922, 1925, 1926); Phoenix Handicap (1923); Excelsior Breeders' Cup Handicap (1923, 1929); Gallant Fox Handicap (1923, 1926, 1927, 1929, 1933); Paumonok Handicap (1923, 1926, 1927, 1929, 1933); Pierrepont Handicap (1923, 1925, 1927); Saratoga Special Stakes (1924, 1927); Toboggan Handicap (1924); Fall Highweight Handicap (1925); Futurity Stakes (1925, 1926); Hopeful Stakes (1925); Bowie Handicap (1926); Lawrence Realization Stakes (1926); Remsen Stakes (1926); Twin City Handicap (1926); Youthful Stakes (1927, 1933); Champlain Handicap (1928, 1932); Fashion Stakes (1928); Hudson Stakes (1928, 1929, 1931); Keene Memorial Stakes (1928); Southampton Handicap (1928); Whitney Handicap (1928); Tremont Stakes (1930); Wilson Stakes (1931)

Racing awards
- United States Champion Jockey by earnings (1925, 1926)

Honors
- National Museum of Racing and Hall of Fame (1955)

Significant horses
- Grey Lag, Little Chief, Mad Play, Peanuts, Pompey
- Updated on May 8, 2020

Laverne Andrew Fator (October 21, 1899 – May 16, 1936) was an American Hall of Fame jockey.

Born in Hailey, Idaho, Laverne Fator and his brothers Mark and Elmer all became jockeys. The most successful of the three, Laverne Fator's riding career began at small bush tracks in the Western United States. His first major win came in 1918 at Oriental Park Racetrack in Havana, Cuba. Returning to the United States, he raced on the New York State circuit in a professional career that lasted through 1933. A contract jockey for Rancocas Stable, in 1925 and 1926 he was the United States Champion Jockey by earnings.

In the American Classic Races, Laverne Fator rode in the Kentucky Derby four times, earning his best finish in 1926 when he finished fifth aboard Pompey. For the 1932 running, prominent stable owner Edward R. Bradley offered top rider Laverne Fator his choice of the two horses he had entered. Fator chose the colt Brother Joe, leaving Burgoo King for 19-year-old Eugene James who won the race. Of his three mounts in the Preakness Stakes, Fator's best result came aboard Mad Play when he finished third in 1923.

Laverne Fator died in a fall from a Jamaica (N.Y.) Hospital window while awaiting an operation. The cause of death was said by TIME magazine to be suicide but it has been reported that he may have been disoriented from his illness and fell accidentally.

On its creation, Laverne Fator was inducted in the United States' National Museum of Racing and Hall of Fame in 1955.
