= Newcastle Stable =

- Company type: Thoroughbred racing stable & breeding farm
- Industry: Horse racing
- Founded: 1903
- Defunct: 1910
- Headquarters: Lexington, Kentucky
- Key people: Andrew Miller; Blair Painter; Francis "Frank" C. Bishop; Thomas Welsh; Trainer: Thomas Welsh

The Newcastle Stable was a Thoroughbred racing partnership formed in 1903 by Life magazine publisher Andrew Miller, Blair Painter, Francis Cunningham Bishop, and trainer Thomas Welsh. Based in New York City, in January 1907 the partners leased the 350 acre Oakwood Farm near Lexington, Kentucky to be used for breeding their own horses. The partnership began operations with thirty-two broodmares and two stallions, Adam and Handspring. The France-bred Adam was a $75,000 imported son of 1899 English Triple Crown winner Flying Fox. Handspring was a multiple stakes winner sired by Hanover, a four-time Leading sire in North America. In December 1907 the partnership would acquire the entire Millstream Stud breeding farm.

== Demise ==
The 1908 passage of the Hart–Agnew anti-betting legislation by the New York Legislature under Republican Governor Charles Evans Hughes not only led to a state-wide shutdown of racing in 1911 and 1912 but profoundly affected racetracks throughout the United States. Owners, whose horses of racing age had nowhere to go, began sending them, their trainers and their jockeys to race in England, France sand other European countries. Many horses ended their racing careers there and a number remained to become an important part of the European horse breeding industry. Thoroughbred Times reported that more than 1,500 American horses were sent overseas between 1908 and 1913 and of them at least 24 were either past, present, or future Champions.

The situation meant the liquidation of the Newcastle racing stable and breeding operation. The market for Thoroughbreds in the United States was in decline and the stallion Adam along with fifteen broodmares were shipped to France, where the partners believed they would get a much better price. Among other sales of Newcastle Stable's many good horses was Bashti, the American Champion Two-Year-Old Filly of 1910. She was sold at an August 20, 1910 auction to New Yorker Harry Payne Whitney for $30,000. Running Water was the American Champion Three-Year-Old Filly of 1906. She too was sold to another New Yorker Herman B. Duryea who moved her to Haras du Gazon, his newly acquired breeding farm in Bazoches-au-Houlme, Orne, Normandy, France
