= Max Hirsch =

American horse trainer (1880–1969)

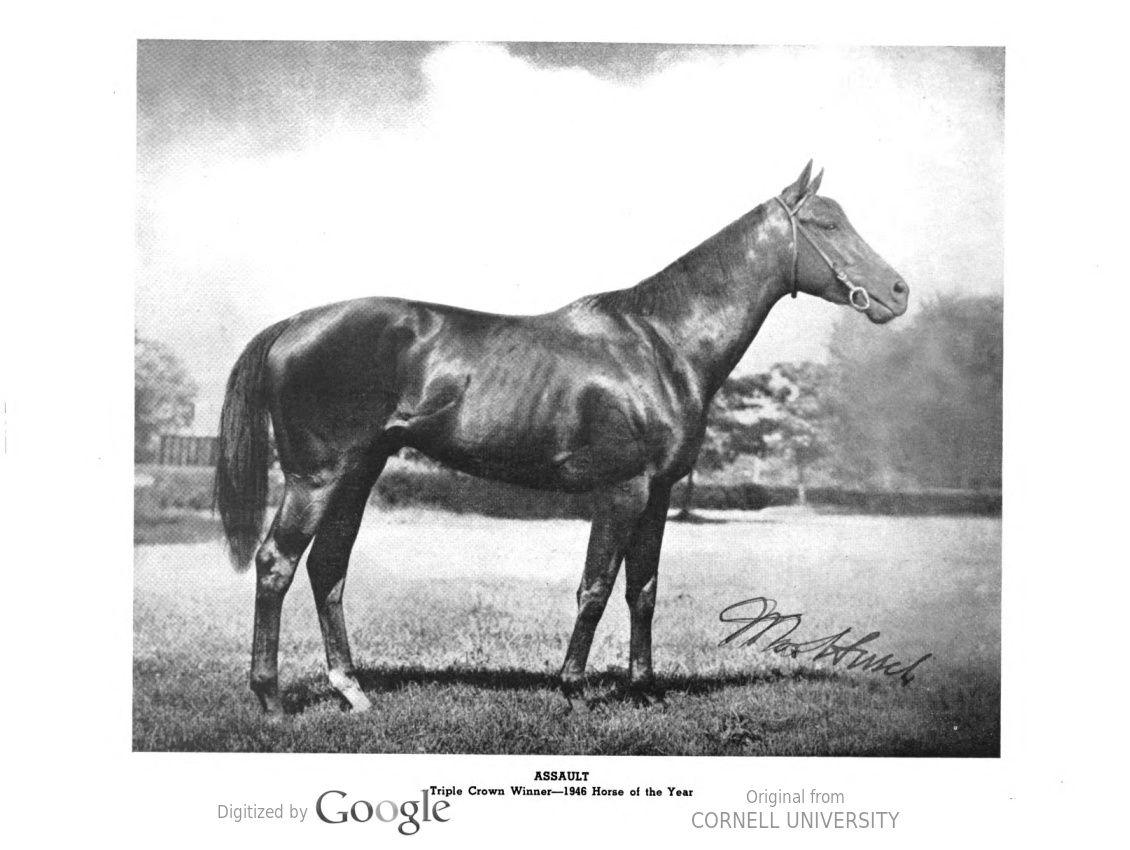
- Max Hirsch signature on Assault photo

Personal information
- Born: July 12, 1880 Fredericksburg, Texas
- Died: April 3, 1969 (aged 89) New Hyde Park, New York
- Occupation: Trainer

Horse racing career
- Sport: Horse racing

Major racing wins
- Flying Handicap (1908); Great Eastern Handicap (1909); Oakdale Handicap (1923); Suburban Handicap (1923, 1946, 1966); Fleetwing Handicap (1924, 1925, 1928); Huron Handicap (1924); International Special No. 3 (1924); Mount Vernon Handicap (1926); Walden Stakes (1926, 1931, 1947); Pierrepont Handicap (1927); Twin City Handicap (1928); Tremont Stakes (1929); Arlington Classic (1932, 1941, 1947); Jockey Club Gold Cup (1932, 1954); Travers Stakes (1934, 1938); Wilson Stakes (1934); Questionnaire Handicap (1938, 1940); New England Futurity (1939); National Stallion Stakes (1940, 1944); Wood Memorial Stakes (1940, 1946); Bahamas Stakes (1941); Bay Shore Handicap (1942); Butler Handicap (1942, 1947); Havre de Grace Handicap (1942); Jersey Derby (1942, 1959, 1968); Metropolitan Handicap (1942, 1955); Juvenile Stakes (1944); Pimlico Special (1946); Daingerfield Handicap (1949); Saratoga Cup (1950); Saratoga Handicap (1950); Whirlaway Handicap (1950); Arlington Handicap (1952); Marguerite Stakes (1952); Edgemere Handicap (1953); Gardenia Stakes (1968) U.S. Triple Crown series: Kentucky Derby (1936, 1946, 1950); Preakness Stakes (1936, 1946); Belmont Stakes (1928, 1946, 1950, 1954); United States Triple Crown (1946)

Honors
- U.S. Racing Hall of Fame (1959)

Significant horses
- Assault, Bold Venture, Bridal Flower; But Why Not, Dawn Play, High Gun, Gallant Bloom, Grey Lag, Middleground, Sarazen, Stymie, Tola Rose, Vito

Maximilian Justice "Max" Hirsch (July 12, 1880 - April 3, 1969) was an American Hall of Fame Thoroughbred racehorse trainer.

== Biography ==
Born in Fredericksburg, Texas, and raised Roman Catholic, Hirsch became one of the most successful trainers in Thoroughbred horse racing history. He spent part of his formative years working as a groom and jockey at Morris Ranch in Gillespie County, Texas. Hirsch conditioned horses for various owners including George W. Loft, Arthur B. Hancock, the infamous Black Sox Scandal gambler Arnold Rothstein, Morton L. Schwartz, Jane Greer, and Virginia Fair Vanderbilt, but is best known for his work with the King Ranch Stable, which he joined in the 1930s and for whom he trained until his death in 1969.

Sarazen was the first Champion Max Hirsch trained and said his win over the French Champion Epinard in the third race of the 1924 International Specials was his greatest thrill in racing. A Hall of Fame inductee, Sarazen was the American Horse of the Year in 1924 and 1925.

Max Hirsch won the first of his four Belmont Stakes in 1928 with Vito. In 1936, he won the Kentucky Derby and Preakness Stakes with Bold Venture and in 1946 captured the U.S. Triple Crown with Bold Venture's son Assault. In 1950, Hirsch won his third Kentucky Derby with another son of Bold Venture, Middleground who also won the Belmont Stakes.

Max Hirsch was inducted into the National Museum of Racing and Hall of Fame in 1959. He died on April 3, 1969, at the Jewish General Hospital on Long Island, New York and was buried next to his wife, Katherine Josephine Clare (1888–1941), in the Cemetery of the Holy Rood in Westbury, Long Island.

His son, Buddy, followed in his footsteps and too was voted into the U.S. Racing Hall of Fame. His daughter, Mary Hirsch, would become the first woman in the United States to be granted a trainer's license.

== In popular culture ==
Hirsch was featured in the eighth episode of season 2 of the HBO Television series Boardwalk Empire, where he was played by Robert Dorfman. There he was seen to be employed by Arnold Rothstein for training his racehorse Sidereal.

== Additional sources ==
- Texas Sports Hall of Fame article on Max Hirsch and the International Special No.3
- Max Hirsch at the United States' National Museum of Racing and Hall of Fame
- Bowen, Edward L. Masters of the Turf: Ten Trainers Who Dominated Horse Racing's Golden Age (2007) Eclipse Press (ISBN 978-1581501490)
