= Andrew Miller (publisher) =

American magazine publisher who co-founded Life magazine (1857-1919)

- Born: February 5, 1857; Hamilton, Province of Canada
- Died: December 31, 1919; Manhattan, New York, US
- Education: Exeter College, Harvard University
- Occupation(s): Magazine publisher, Racehorse owner/breeder
- Known for: Co-founder of Life magazine & owner of Roamer; Partner: Newcastle Stable
- Spouse: Nina LeRoy (d. 1944)
- Children: 2

Andrew Miller (February 5, 1857 – December 31, 1919) was an American magazine publisher and Thoroughbred racehorse owner and breeder. He was a founding partner, secretary and treasurer of Life magazine.

Born in Hamilton, Ontario, Canada, Andrew Miller studied at Exeter College before graduating in 1880 from Harvard University where he was a classmate of Theodore Roosevelt.

Andrew Miller began his career in the publishing industry as an employee at the Daily Graphic, a New York City newspaper that was the first with daily illustrations. He left a year later to found Life magazine with John Ames Mitchell. Miller would hold a twenty-five percent interest in the magazine with Mitchell the remainder. Both men would retain their holdings until their deaths. The success of Life magazine allowed Miller to indulge his passion for horse racing.

== Thoroughbred racing ==
Andrew Miller owned racehorses for more than thirty years, starting with trotters and steeplechase runners before becoming heavily involved with racing Thoroughbreds on the flat. His most famous horse was Roamer, the 1914 American Horse of the Year and a U.S. Racing Hall of Fame inductee. Among his other racing successes, Andrew Miller's filly Lady Rotha won the Amsterdam and Travers Stakes in 1915. His colt, Ticket won the 1916 Tremont Stakes at age two and finished second as the favorite in the 1917 Kentucky Derby.

Miller served in various positions in the horse industry. He was President of the Driving Club of New York which operated the Fleetwood Park Racetrack harness racing track in Westchester County, New York, he was a Steward with the Jockey Club, Secretary and Treasurer of the Saratoga Racing Association, and a Steward at Morris Park Racecourse.

Andrew Miller died on December 31, 1919, at his home in Manhattan at age 62.
