= Commonwealth Handicap =

- Class: Discontinued
- Location: Sheepshead Bay Race Track; Sheepshead Bay, New York
- Inaugurated: 1903
- Race type: Thoroughbred – Flat racing

Race information
- Distance: 1¼ miles
- Surface: Dirt
- Track: left-handed
- Qualification: Three years & older

The Commonwealth Handicap was an American Thoroughbred horse race run annually from 1903 through 1910 at Sheepshead Bay Race Track in Sheepshead Bay, New York. Open to horses age three and older, it was run on dirt over a distance of 1¼ miles on dirt. It was raced in its first year as the "Suburban Renewal Handicap" having been created as a sequel to Suburban Handicap, the most important race in New York at the time for horses aged three and older. In a July 1, 1906 review of upcoming races, the Daily Racing Form referred to the Commonwealth Handicap as a "highly important" race.

== Historical notes ==
Waterboy won the 1903 inaugural edition and would go on to retrospectively be named that year's American Champion Older Male Horse. In the next two years Ort Wells and then Sysonby would similarly be named the American Champion Three-Year-Old Male Horse for the year of their win.

The 1906 winner Sir Huon came into the Commonwealth Handicap as the victor in the May 2 Kentucky Derby. However, New York racing fans thought little of the "western" horse and sent him off as a 15-1 longshot Sir Huron then showed it was no fluke and won the Seagate Stakes at Brighton Beach Race Course.

In winning the 1910 and last running of the Commonwealth Handicap, Richard Wilson Jr.'s speedy Olambala equaled the American record for a mile and one-quarter set by Broomstick six years earlier.

== Closing ==
The race had a short existence as a result of the Hart–Agnew anti-betting legislation passed by the New York Legislature which devastated horse racing. For its first six years the winner's share of the purse for the Commonwealth Handicap averaged more than $12,000 but for its final two runnings in 1909 and 1910 the winner's share was reduced to less than 20% of what it had been. When a February 21, 1913 ruling by the New York Supreme Court, Appellate Division saw horse racing return it was too late for the Sheepshead Bay horse racing facility and it never reopened.

== Records ==
Speed record:

- 2:02 4/5 @ 11/4 miles : Olambala (1910) (equaled American record)

Most wins:

- No horse won this race more than once.

Most wins by a jockey:

- No jockey won this race more than once.

Most wins by a trainer:

- 2 – A. Jack Joyner (1903, 1908)

Most wins by an owner:

- No owner won this race more than once.

== Winners ==
Year	Winner	Age	Jockey	Trainer	Owner	Dist. (Miles)	Time	Win$
1910	Olambala	4	James Butwell	Thomas J. Healey	Montpelier Stable	11/4	2:02.80	$2,250
1909	King's Daughter	6	Stanley B. Page	George Denny	Thomas Clay McDowell	11/4	2:04.00	$1,925
1908	Priscillian	3	Walter Miller	A. Jack Joyner	August Belmont Jr.	11/4	2:08.60	$12,300
1907	Montgomery	3	Guy Garner	Robert Augustus Smith	Emil Herz	11/4	2:06.60	$13,850
1906	Sir Huon	3	Roscoe Troxler	Peter Coyne	Bashford Manor Stable	11/4	2:05.20	$12,900
1905	Sysonby	3	Dave Nicol	James G. Rowe Sr.	James R. Keene	11/4	2:07.00	$12,225
1904	Ort Wells	3	Frank O'Neill	Enoch Wishard	John A. Drake	11/4	2:06.60	$13,425
1903	Waterboy	4	George M. Odom	A. Jack Joyner	James Ben Ali Haggin	11/4	2:04.60	$9,900
