= Bashford Manor Stakes =

- Class: Listed
- Location: Churchill Downs; Louisville, Kentucky, United States
- Inaugurated: 1902
- Race type: Thoroughbred – Flat racing
- Website: www.churchilldowns.com

Race information
- Distance: 6 furlongs
- Surface: Dirt
- Track: left-handed
- Qualification: two-year-olds
- Weight: Assigned
- Purse: US$100,000

The Bashford Manor Stakes is a six furlong sprint for two-year-old thoroughbred horses run each year toward the end of the Spring meet at Churchill Downs. It is a Listed race on the dirt and currently offers a purse of $100,000, (plus $7,500 added from the Breeders' Cup program). It was named in honor of the Bashford Manor Stable owned by George J. Long and which produced several Kentucky Derby contestants plus three Derby winners: Azra (1892), Manuel (1899) and Sir Huon (1906).

== History ==
1902 served as the first running of the Bashford Manor Stakes won by Von Rouse. In 1911, Worth won the Bashford Manor, and the following year won the Kentucky Derby. In 1923 it was won by Black Gold, the winner of the 1924 Kentucky Derby. Other Kentucky Derby winners who ran in the Bashford Manor include Donau, who was third in 1909, Old Rosebud who was second in 1913, Clyde Van Dusen who was unplaced in 1928, and more recently, Grindstone, who finished fourth in 1995. All of them won the Kentucky Derby the following year.

== Records ==
Speed record:

- 0:53.00 @ 4.5 furlongs : Reputation (1924)
- 0:57.80 @ 5 furlongs : Santiago Road (1968)
- 1:09.15 @ 6 furlongs : Kodiak Kowboy (2007)

Most wins by a jockey:

- 4 – Julio Espinoza (1979, 1980, 1990, 1991)
- 4 – Pat Day (1983, 1984, 1989, 1997)

Most wins by a trainer:

- 5 – D. Wayne Lukas (1992, 1996, 1998, 1999, 2000)
- 5 – Steve Asmussen (2004, 2007, 2010, 2014, 2018)

Most wins by an owner:

- 3 – Milky Way Farm (1936, 1937, 1941)
- 3 – T. Alie Grissom (1957, 1961, 1969)
- 3 – Padua Stables (1998, 1999, 2000)

== Winners ==
Year	Winner	Age	Jockey	Trainer	Owner	Dist. (Miles)	Time	Win$	Gr.
2022	Gulfport	2	Brian Hernandez Jr.	Steve Asmussen	L William Heiligbrodt, Corinne Heiligbrodt Et Al	6 F	1:09.25	$175,000	Listed
2021	Double Thunder	2	John Velazquez	Todd Pletcher	Phoenix Thoroughbred, LTD	6 F	1:11.17	$88,350	G3
2020	Cazadero	2	Ricardo Santana Jr.	Steve Asmussen	Stonestreet Farm LLC	6 F	1:09.73	$60,760	G3
2019	Phantom Boss	2	Rafael Bejarano	Jorge Periban	Bada Beng Racing LLC/Tom Beckerle/Terry C. Lovingier	6 F	1:10.78	$75,950	G3
2018	Sir Troubadour	2	Ricardo Santana Jr.	Steve Asmussen	Whispering Oaks Farm LLC	6 F	1:12.77	$57,660	G3
2017	Ten City	2	Robby Albarado	Kenny McPeek	Tommie M. Lewis	6 F	1:10.45	$62,000	G3
2016	Classic Empire	2	Julien Leparoux	Mark E. Casse	John C. Oxley	6 F	1:09.39	$59,520	G3
2015	Comin In Hot	2	Jamie Theriot	W. Bret Calhoun	Douglas Scharbauer	6 F	1:10.90	$60,760	G3
2014	Cinco Charlie	2	Shaun Bridgmohan	Steve Asmussen	William & Corinne Heiligbrodt	6 F	1:10.36	$67,022	G3
2013	Debt Ceiling	2	Eric Camacho	Jerry Robb	Tim O'Donohue	6 F	1:10.66	$67,687	G3
2012	Circle Unbroken	2	Jon Court	Gary Simms	Travis Morgeson V, LLC	6 F	1:11.21	$66,034	G3
2011	Exfactor	2	Calvin Borel	Bernard Flint	Stoneway Farm LLC	6 F	1:10.30	$67,748	G3
2010	Kantharos	2	Robby Albarado	Steve Asmussen	Stonestreet Stables LLC	6 F	1:09.89	$66,413	G3
2009	Backtalk	2	Miguel Mena	Thomas Amoss	Gold Mark Farm LLC	6 F	1:11.08	$66,455	G3
2008	Screen Your Friend	2	Calvin Borel	Bernard Flint	William Carl	6 F	1:10.84	$99,981	G3
2007	Kodiak Kowboy	2	Corey Lanerie	Steve Asmussen	Vinery Stables	6 F	1:09.15	$101,373	G3
2006	Circular Quay	2	Rafael Bejarano	Todd Pletcher	Michael Tabor	6 F	1:09.96	$100,134	G3
2005	Deputy G	2	Gary Stevens	David E. Pate	Spade Stable (James Skaggs)	6 F	1:11.38	$109,275	G3
2004	Lunarpal	2	Shane Sellers	Steve Asmussen	Heiligbrodt Racing Stable	6 F	1:11.54	$101,184	G3
2003	Limehouse	2	Robby Albarado	Todd Pletcher	Dogwood Stable	6 F	1:10.62	$100,905	G3
2002	Lone Star Sky	2	Mark Guidry	Thomas M. Amoss	Walter New	6 F	1:09.68	$84,475	G3
2001	Lunar Bounty	2	Frank Lovato Jr.	Ronny Werner	Tom Durant	6 F	1:09.90	$82,925	G2
2000	Duality	2	Calvin Borel	D. Wayne Lukas	Padua Stables & Phillips Racing Partnership	6 F	1:10.09	$86,258	G2
1999	Dance Master	2	Brian Peck	D. Wayne Lukas	Padua Stables	6 F	1:10.38	$89,280	G2
1998	Time Bandit	2	Charles Woods Jr.	D. Wayne Lukas	Padua Stables	6 F	1:10.78	$68,262	G3
1997	Favorite Trick	2	Pat Day	Patrick Byrne	Joseph LaCombe	6 F	1:09.92	$68,696	G3
1996	Boston Harbor	2	Mike Luzzi	D. Wayne Lukas	Overbrook Farm	6 F	1:09.96	$72,150	G3
1995	A. V. Eight	2	Angelo Trosclair	Robert E. Holthus	Dan Jones	6 F	1:11.40	$71,630	G3
1994	Hyroglyphic	2	Garrett Gomez	James Keefer	Jack Hammer & William Heiligbrodt	6 F	1:10.25	$75,660	G3
1993	Miss Ra He Ra	2	Willie Martinez	Glenn Wismer	Alyce & Joseph Novogratz	6 F	1:12.98	$76,180	G3
1992	Mountain Cat	2	Charles Woods Jr.	D. Wayne Lukas	Overbrook Farm	6 F	1:10.62	$53,869	G3
1991	Pick Up the Phone	2	Julio Espinoza	John J. Tammaro Jr.	Herman Heinlein	6 F	1:12.08	$35,815	G3
1990	To Freedom	2	Julio Espinoza	John J. Tammaro Jr.	Herman Heinlein	6 F	1:10.20	$35,555	L
1989	Summer Squall	2	Pat Day	Neil J. Howard	Dogwood Stable	6 F	1:12.20	$35,068	L
1988	Bio	2	Patrick Johnson	Steve C.Penrod	Dell Hancock	6 F	1:11.80	$37,148	L
1987	Blair's Cove	2	Shane Sellers	Rodney Boatwright	Irish Acres Farm (P. Noel & Margaret Ann Hickey)	6 F	1:11.80	$37,310	L
1986	Faster Than Sound	2	Craig Perret	Edwin K. Cleveland Jr.	H. Joseph Allen & Howard Kaskel	6 F	1:11.20	$46,648	L
1985	Tile	2	Larry Melancon	Steve C. Penrod	Claiborne Farm	5 F	1:04.40	$30,896	L
1984	Jerry F.	2	Pat Day	Larry D. Edwards	Mrs. Harrison Johnson	5.5 F	1:05.80	$17,241	L
1983	Betwixt n' Between	2	Pat Day	Donald R. Winfree	James J. Devaney	5.5 F	1:05.00	$22,897	L
1982	Willow Drive	2	Jack Neagle	Peter M. Vestal	Samuel Hinkle	5.5 F	1:05.00	$20,264	L
1981	T. V. Mark	2	Paul Nicolo	Smiley Adams	Golden Chance Farm	5 F	0:59.60	$18,102	L
1980	Golden Derby	2	Julio Espinoza	Smiley Adams	Fred Lehmann	5 F	0:59.00	$19,338	L
1979	Rajohn Greco	2	Julio Espinoza	Jasper Adams	Mr. & Mrs. Allaine Cassagne	5 F	1:00.20	$19,451	L
1978	Spy Charger	2	Gary Mahon	John Vass	Mr. & Mrs. John Vass	5 F	0:58.40	$14,089	L
1977	Going Investor	2	Bernon Sayler	Donald L. Ball	Donamire Farm (Donald & Mira Ball)	5 F	0:58.40	$14,235	L
1976	Judge John Boone	2	Eddie Delahoussaye	Thomas H. Jolley	Bobby Oldham	5 F	0:58.60	$14,625	L
1975	Khyber King	2	Eddie Delahoussaye	James Eckrosh	Chet & Gerry Herringer	5 F	0:58.60	$15,633	L
1974	Pac Quick	2	Garth Patterson	Dick Fischer	Brownell Combs II	5 F	0:59.60	$16,608	L
1973	Tisab	2	Mike Manganello	Larry Spraker	Mill Ridge Farm (Alice Headley Chandler)	5 F	0:58.80	$16,965	L
1972	Pleasure Castle	2	David Whited	David Vance	Dan Lasater	5 F	0:58.20	$17,160	
1971	Whitesburg	2	Tommy Sisum	Peter Salmen Jr.	Crimson King Farm (Peter W. Salmen)	5 F	0:58.60	$16,315	
1970	Hook It Up	2	Jimmy Nichols	Douglas M. Davis Jr.	Larry Wolken & Miles J. Cooperman	5 F	0:58.40	$16,088	
1969	Spotted Line	2	David Whited	Dewey P. Smith	T. Alie & J. E. Grissom	5 F	0:59.00	$12,448	
1968	Santiago Road	2	Mike Manganello	Harry Trotsek	Hasty House Farm (Allie E. Reuben)	5 F	0:57.80	$12,773	
1967	T. V. Commercial	2	Mike Manganello	Anthony L. Basile	Bwamazon Farm (Millard A. Waldheim)	5 F	0:58.20	$12,724	
1966	Willow Cage	2	Billy Phelps	Stanley M. Rieser	Frank Osborne, Priscilla Willis, Thomas Eddy Jr.	5 F	0:58.60	$13,113	
1965	He Jr.	2	Jack Fieselman	Dick Posey	Everett Lowrance	5 F	0:58.60	$12,123	
1964	Loom	2	Jimmy Nichols	Burton B. Williams	Hugh A. Grant	5 F	0:58.40	$12,480	
1963	Amastar	2	Jimmy Nichols	Norman A. McMaster	Grace Creek Farm (Max Clark)	5 F	0:58.20	$12,318	
1962	Keeper's Choice	2	Jacinto Vásquez	Wilbur Borton	Ben S. Castleman	5 F	1:00.40	$9,100	
1961	Mike G.	2	William M. Cook	Vester R. Wright	T. Alie Grissom	5 F	0:58.40	$9,409	
1960	He's a Pistol	2	Kenneth Church	Chester Bowles	Graham Brown	5 F	0:58.60	$8,759	
1959	Maxinkuckee	2	W. B. Williams	C. H. Edmunds	Preston Madden	5 F	0:59.00	$9,685	
1958	Tribalove	2	Fred Smith	Strother Griffin	Brinkman, Engle & Brewer	5 F	0:58.80	$8,938	
1957	Litte Reaper	2	Johnny Sellers	Vester R. Wright	T. Alie Grissom	5 F	0:58.80	$10,775	
1956	Jet Sub	2	Bobby Baird	Henry Forrest	Exchange Stable	5 F	0:59.20	$13,200	
1955-1	Swoon's Son	2	David Erb	Alexis G. Wilson	E. Gray Drake	5 F	1:01.00	$10,425	
1955-2	Tiger Wander	2	Al Popara	Norman A. McMaster	Sam E. Wilson Jr.	5 F	1:01.00	$10,425	
1954	Royal Note	2	Henry E. Moreno	Frank Gilpin	Wilton Stable (Tilford L. Wilson & Carl T. Houston)	5 F	1:00.20	$13,100	
1953	Mr. Prosecutor	2	John Adams	Henry Forrest	Green Acres Stock Farm (Mark Leach)	5 F	0:59.60	$13,150	
1952-1	Royal Flavor	2	Kenneth Church	Joe Jansen	Sam E. Wilson Jr.	5 F	1:01.60	$9,188	
1952-2	Ace Destroyer	2	Tommy Barrow	E. C. Dobson	Mr. & Mrs. Thomas M. Daniel	5 F	1:01.40	$9,188	
1951	Red Curtice	2	Job Dean Jessop	Robert V. McGarvey	Jean Denemark	5 F	0:58.80	$10,250	
1950	King's Hope	2	Bobby Baird	Freddie Sharpe	Elite Stud Farm	5 F	1:01.20	$10,625	
1949	Old Tom	2	Paul Duff	Harry Trotsek	O. Frank Woodward	5 F	1:00.00	$10,225	
1948	Ky. Colonel	2	Steve Brooks	John Milton Goode	Joseph A. Goodwin	5 F	1:00.20	$10,050	
1947	Phar Mon	2	Steve Brooks	Warren G. Douglass	William H. Veeneman Sr.	5 F	1:00.40	$10,153	
1946	Tweet's Boy	2	Porter Roberts	Warren G. Douglass	William H. Veeneman Sr.	5 F	1:01.60	$10,300	
1945	Fighting Frank	2	George South	H. H. (Pete) Battle	Louise Donovan	5 F	1:00.40	$5,050	
1944	Best Effort	2	Michael Caffarella	Willie Crump	Claud C. Tanner	5 F	1:01.80	$3,005	
1943	Black Swan	2	Michael Caffarella	James McGee	Max Marmorstein	5 F	1:00.80	$2,735	
1942	Navy Cross	2	Jack Richard	Kirby Ramsey	Edward A. Carney & Kirby Ramsey	5 F	0:59.60	$3,045	
1941	Black Raider	2	Arthur Craig	Roy Waldron	Milky Way Farm	5 F	0:59.60	$2,650	
1940	Air Brigade	2	T. Marshall	Jake G. Angner	Jake G. Angner	5 F	1:01.20	$2,525	
1939	Roman	2	Warren Yarberry	Daniel E. Stewart	Joseph E. Widener	5 F	0:59.40	$2,615	
1938	Royal Pam	2	Ira Hanford	Sherrill W. Ward	Johnson N. Camden Jr.	5 F	0:59.00	$5,390	
1937	Sky Larking	2	Alfred Robertson	Robert V. McGarvey	Milky Way Farm	5 F	1:01.60	$5,460	
1936	Murph	2	Eddie Arcaro	Robert V. McGarvey	Milky Way Farm	5 F	0:59.20	$6,015	
1935	Coldstream	2	Paul Keester	Alex B. Gordon	Coldstream Stud (Charles B. Shaffer)	5 F	0:59.40	$3,035	
1934	St. Bernard	2	Herman Schulte	Alex B. Gordon	E. Dale Shaffer	5 F	1:00.60	$3,165	
1933	Miss Patience	2	Gilbert Elston	Joseph F. Patterson	Audley Farm Stable	5 F	1:01.80	$5,590	
1932	In High	2	Clarence McCrossen	Clyde Van Dusen	Dixiana Stable	5 F	1:00.40	$5,710	
1931	Proteus	2	Joseph Smith	Anthony Pelleteri	Anthony Pelleteri	5 F	1:01.00	$7,030	
1930	Back Log	2	Herb Fisher	S. Sewell Combs	Allan B. Gallaher & S. Sewell Combs	5 F	1:00.40	$7,260	
1929	All Upset	2	R. Zucchini	Frank P. Letellier	Southland Stable (Charles Bacharach)	5 F	1:00.00	$7,400	
1928	Roguish Eye	2	Jake Heupal	Danny B. Miller	John J. Coughlin	5 F	1:00.20	$7,580	
1927	Typhoon	2	Albert Johnson	Monk Overton	Kenton Farm Stable (John A. Payne Jr. & Robert H. West Jr.)	5 F	1:00.20	$7,820	
1926	Torchilla	2	Eddie Legere	Clyde Van Dusen	William E. Applegate	5 F	1:00.60	$7,740	
1925	Take a Chance	2	H. Hamilton	John J. Flanigan	George Kirk	4.5 F	0:54.00	$7,860	
1924	Reputation	2	E. Smallwood	Richard D. Williams	Williams Bros.	4.5 F	0:53.00	$6,280	
1923	Black Gold	2	Danny Connelly	Hanley Webb	Rosa M. Hoots	4.5 F	0:53.00	$7,520	
1922	Triumph	2	Albert Johnson	John C. Gallaher	Gallaher Bros.	4.5 F	0:53.80	$6,980	
1921	Casey	2	Danny Connelly	William Perkins	G. F. Baker	4.5 F	0:55.20	$5,900	
1920	United Verde	2	Lavelle Ensor	George V. Barnes	Charles W. Clark	4.5 F	0:55.60	$7,075	
1919	Sam Freedman	2	John Morys	Joseph Umensetter	Oscar Rehm	4.5 F	0:54.20	$4,680	
1918	Billy Kelly	2	E. Simpson	William Perkins	William F. Polson	4.5 F	0:54.00	$2,910	
1917	Escoba	2	Jack Hanover	William J. Young	Kenneth D. Alexander	4.5 F	0:54.00	$2,920	
1916	Harry Kelly	2	Guy Garner	George Land	John W. Schorr	4.5 F	0:53.60	$2,190	
1915	Ellison	2	Roscoe Goose	John F. Schorr	John W. Schorr	4.5 F	0:54.20	$2,350	
1914	Luke	2	William Taylor	Jack Keene	Johnson N. Camden Jr.	4.5 F	0:53.00	$2,710	
1913	Little Nephew	2	Johnny Loftus	Elza Brown	Michael B. Gruber	4.5 F	0:53.00	$700	
1912	Hawthorn	2	Oscar Fain	William S. Trevey	Charles F. Buschemeyer	4.5 F	0:54.00	$1,940	
1911	Worth	2	Ted Koerner	Frank M. Taylor	Harry C. Hallenbeck	4.5 F	0:54.80	$1,990	
1910	La U Mexcian	2	E. Griffin	T. M. Irvin	L. Kelly	4.5 F	0:54.20	$1,800	
1909	Joe Morris	2	Stanley B. Page	Auval John Baker	Robert H. Anderson	4.5 F	0:53.40	$1,690	
1908	Fundamental	2	Sam Heidel	Winfield S. Williams	Winfield S. Williams	4.5 F	0:54.40	$1,415	
1907	John Marrs	2	Roscoe Troxler	William Grater	William Grater & Co.	4.5 F	0:54.00	$1,570	
1906	Zal	2	William Obert	William L. McDaniel	William Gerst	4.5 F	0:56.00	$1,720	
1905	George C. Bennett	2	Dave Nicol	William E. Phillips	Frederick Cook	4.5 F	0:56.25	$1,600	
1904	Oiseau	2	Louis A. Munro	Albert Franklin	John J. Greener & Co.	4.5 F	0:54.50	$1,360	
1903	J. P. Mayberry	2	Hal Booker	John P. Mayberry	Charles Ellison	4.5 F	0:55.00	$1,485	
1902	Von Rouse	2	Jimmy Winkfield	Frank Bruhns	F. Bruhns & Co.	4.5 F	0:55.25	$1,335	
