= Charles Edward (horse) =

American Thoroughbred racehorse

- Sire: Golden Garter
- Grandsire: Bend Or
- Dam: Flora Mac
- Damsire: Falsetto
- Sex: Stallion
- Foaled: 1904
- Country: United States
- Color: Chestnut
- Breeder: James B. A. Haggin
- Owner: Sydney Paget; Sydney Paget & Edward R. Thomas (1906-07-10); Patchogue Stable (William H. DuBois) (1907–06)
- Trainer: A. Jack Joyner; Frank M. Taylor (1907–08)
- Record: 16: 6-5-2
- Earnings: US$31,448

Major wins
- National Stallion Stakes (1906); Brighton Derby (1907); Seagate Stakes (1907); Brighton Mile (1907)

Charles Edward (foaled 1904 in California) was an American Thoroughbred racehorse who in less than a month in 1907 set three track records including a world record. In a 1910 history of one of the three races, the Daily Racing Form wrote that Charles Edward "gave in the Seagate one of the most amazing displays of high-class speed ever witnessed."

== Background ==
James Ben Ali Haggin, an American breeder and owner of a successful racing operation, bred Charles Edward at his Rancho Del Paso stud in California. His English sire was Golden Garter, a son of Bend Or who in 1880 won England's most prestigious race, the Epsom Derby. At stud, Bend Or was the Leading broodmare sire in Great Britain and Ireland in 1901 and 1902. Golden Garter had been imported by Haggin in 1894.

Flora Mac was Charles Edward's dam. Golden Garter's first mating with Flora Mac produced the 1903 colt Jacobite who won six stakes races as a two-year-old. Their second mating brought Charles Edwards.

Flora Mac was a daughter of Falsetto whose wins included the 1879 Travers Stakes and Clark Handicap. Falsetto finished second in the 1879 Kentucky Derby then went on to a performance that would earn him that year's American Champion 3-Year-Old Colt honors. Beyond Falsetto's racing success, he is the only horse in history to sire three Kentucky Derby winners. Sons Chant won the 1894 Derby, His Eminence the 1901 edition and Sir Huon did it in 1906.

== Racing at age two ==
Charles Edward was purchased by Sydney Paget from his breeder's sale in late 1905. Trained by future National Museum of Racing and Hall of Fame inductee Jack Joyner, Charles Edward ran second in two purse races then won the June 2, 1906 National Stallion Stakes at Belmont Park. He was ridden by Walter Miller, another future Hall of Famer who had been the 1906 National Riding Champion and who would repeat as Champion in 1907. On June 30, Charles Edward ran fourth to winner Oran in the Great Trial Stakes at Sheepshead Bay Race Track.

On July 10, 1906, New York businessman Edward R. Thomas paid Sydney Paget $50,000 for a half-interest in Charles Edward plus another successful runner, the two-year-old colt Water Pearl. Subsequently, Charles Edward contracted a skin condition that kept him out of racing for a time but his return in the summer resulted in only a sixth-place performance behind winner Salvidere in the Saratoga Special Stakes. The form chart summed up Charles Edwards with one succinct statement: "Charles Edwards ran poorly." Later, trainer Jack Joyner advised that Charles Edward had suffered from a spread hoof in the race and that he had made the decision to rest the colt for the remainder of the year.

== Racing at age three ==
Charles Edward made his first start of the year on May 23, 1907, a winning one for owner Sydney Paget and trainer Jack Joyner in a handicap of about six furlongs at New York's Gravesend Race Track. On that same racecard, Charles Edward's full brother Jacobite, also trained by Joyner, won the Patchogue Stakes for owner Edward R. Thomas. Two days later Charles Edward finished third in the Carlton Stakes to Dinna Ken and Peter Pan, the mile race run in a track record time of 1:38 4/5.

At Belmont Park, on May 30 Charles Edward finished second by a head to Jack Atkin in the 6 1/2-furlong Claremont Handicap.

On June 24 in the one mile Equality Stakes run in a dense fog at Sheepshead Bay, Charles Edward earned another second-place result, this time to Frank Gill but ahead of third-place finisher Roseben. In his next race he would be second to Baby Wolf over 7 furlongs in the June 26 Swift Stakes

=== Charles Edward sold ===
Sydney Paget and Edward Thomas dissolved their partnership through an auction of their horses at the July 6, 1907 "Horses in Training Sale" at the Sheepshead track. Charles Edwards was purchased by William DuBois for $9,200 who would race him under the nom de course Patchogue Stable. Made fit and ready to race by Jack Joyner, the Patchogue Stable and trainer Frank Taylor would immediately reap the benefits at Coney Island's Brighton Beach Race Course when Charles Edwards set three track records at three different distances:

- July 10, 1907 : Brighton Mile - 1 mile on dirt 1:37 3/5
- July 17, 1907 : Seagate Stakes - 1 1/8 miles on dirt 1:50 3/5
- August 4, 1907 : Brighton Derby - 1 1/2 miles on dirt 2:30 4/5

Ridden by future Hall of Fame inductee Willie Knapp in the three races, Charles Edwards was carrying big weight yet still finished all his record breaking runs in a canter. In a 1910 history of the Seagate Stakes, the Daily Racing Form wrote that Charles Edward "gave in the Seagate one of the most amazing displays of high-class speed ever witnessed."

Charles Edward made his next start in the August 17 Great Republic Stakes at Saratoga Race Course. It would prove a difficult race and one in which the Daily Racing Form believed he should not have participated. Things began going wrong on the morning of the race when Charles Edward was kicked by stablemate Nealon. His next obstacle was a heavy track whose condition was such that several other owners had chosen to withdraw their horses, leaving only three starters. On a taxing racetrack, Charles Edwards ran third behind winner Ballot, a very good horse but one Charles Edward had easily beaten by four lengths in the July 10 Brighton Mile.

Nagging foot and leg problems continued and Charles Edward was again taken out of racing. By the end of 1907 it was hoped he might come back to compete as a four-year-old. Although at one point he was expected to run in several scheduled stakes events, his racing days were over.

== At stud ==
Charles Edward attracted a limited number of breeders because of what might be his inherent health issues. By 1916 Charles Edward was standing at the stud farm of George M. Hendrie in Ontario, Canada but his success was very modest.

== Pedigree ==
Pedigree of Charles Edward, chestnut stallion, 1904
Sire Golden Garter	Bend Or	Doncaster	Stockwell
Sire Golden Garter	Bend Or	Doncaster	Marigold
Sire Golden Garter	Bend Or	Rouge Rose	Thormanby
Sire Golden Garter	Bend Or	Rouge Rose	Ellen Horne
Sire Golden Garter	Sanda	Wenlock	Lord Clifden
Sire Golden Garter	Sanda	Wenlock	Mineral
Sire Golden Garter	Sanda	Sandal	Stockwell
Sire Golden Garter	Sanda	Sandal	Lady Evelyn
Dam Flora Mac	Falsetto	Enquirer	Leamington
Dam Flora Mac	Falsetto	Enquirer	Lida
Dam Flora Mac	Falsetto	Farfaletta	Australian
Dam Flora Mac	Falsetto	Farfaletta	Elkhorna
Dam Flora Mac	Flora MacDonald	Knight of the Garter	The Prime Minister
Dam Flora Mac	Flora MacDonald	Knight of the Garter	Rosa Bonheur
Dam Flora Mac	Flora MacDonald	Lady MacDonald	Touchstone
Dam Flora Mac	Flora MacDonald	Lady MacDonald	Fair Helen (family: 4-e)
