= Tremont Stakes =

- Class: Listed Stakes
- Location: Belmont Park; Elmont, New York, United States
- Inaugurated: 1887
- Race type: Thoroughbred – Flat racing

Race information
- Distance: 5 1/2 furlongs
- Surface: Dirt
- Track: left-handed
- Qualification: Two-year-olds
- Weight: Assigned
- Purse: US$150,000 (2019)

The Tremont Stakes is a Listed American Thoroughbred horse race run annually for two-year-olds over the distance of 5 1/2 furlongs on the dirt in early June at Belmont Park in Elmont, New York. The event carries a purse of US$150,000. (A furlong is 1/8 mi or 0.20 km.)

== History ==
First held in 1887, it is named for the horse Tremont, who, according to the New York Racing Association, was acclaimed by 19th Century horse racing historians as the best two-year-old ever bred in the United States. It was first run at the Gravesend Race Track at Coney Island in Brooklyn until 1910 when racing was no longer viable after the New York State Legislature passed the Hart–Agnew Law which outlawed all racetrack betting. Although the law was repealed in time to resume racing in 1913, the Gravesend Racetrack never reopened. The Tremont Stakes was restarted in 1914.

The race was not run in 1911–1913, 1933–1935 and 2009–2013.

It is the first stakes race on the Belmont Park stakes schedule for two-year-old colts.

In 1975, E. Rodriguez Tizol brought his colt Bold Forbes from the El Comandante racetrack in Puerto Rico to compete against top horses at the big tracks in New York. He made his first start in the Tremont Stakes and won easily won by five lengths while setting a new stakes record of 1:09 2/5 for six furlongs that still stands through 2018. In his first full season in the United States, Bold Forbes would be voted the 1976 Eclipse Award as the American Champion Three-Year-Old Male Horse.

=== Grade ===
Although the Tremont Stake is currently ungraded, after the grading of races came into effect in 1973 it earned Grade III status for 1981–1996 and 1999–2003. In earlier years it was a very important New York race for two-year-olds and was won by some of the great names in Thoroughbred racing such as U.S. Racing Hall of Fame inductees Man o' War, Sarazen, Buckpasser, Foolish Pleasure, and Alydar.

The race was usually held in early June.

Due to the troubled economy in 2008, the Tremont was canceled by the NYRA as they adjusted races to meet the new Grade I standard purse of $300,000. It was reinstated in 2014 in mid June at the same distance. In 2015, the date for the race was moved to the Friday before the Belmont Stakes as part of the Belmont Racing Festival.

=== Venue ===
The Tremont Stakes has also been run at the following tracks

- Gravesend Race Track – 1887 to 1910
- Aqueduct Racetrack – 1914 to 1955, 1960 to 1974 & 1976
- Jamaica Race Course – 1956, 1958
- Saratoga Racetrack – 2024

=== Race distances ===
- 5 furlongs : 1936–1939
- 5 1/2 furlongs : 1940, 1973, 1989–2008, 2014–present
- 5 3/4 furlongs : 1901–1910
- 6 furlongs : 1887- 1900, 1914–1932, 1976–ProNoun 11

== Records ==
Speed record:

- 5 furlongs : Gannet, 0:58.60 (1939)
- 5 1/2 furlongs : More Than Ready, 1:02.56 (1999)
- 5 3/4 furlongs : Fayette, 1:09.60 (1908)
- 6 furlongs : Bold Forbes, 1:09.40 (1975)

Most wins by a jockey:

- 6 – John Velazquez (1999, 2001, 2003, 2006, 2007, 2014, 2016)

Most wins by a trainer:

- 5 – James E. Fitzsimmons (1927, 1932, 1948, 1952, 1953)
- 5 – Todd Pletcher (1999, 2003, 2006, 2007, 2016)

Most wins by an owner:

- 5 – Wheatley Stable (1927, 1952, 1953, 1964, 1966)

== Winners ==
- Tremont Stakes history and chart at the NYRA:

Year	Winner	Jockey	Trainer	Owner	Dist. (Furlongs)	Time	Win$
2025	Mythical	Emisael Jaramillo	Jorge Delgado	Arindel	5 1/2 F	1:03.57	$82,500
2024	Studlydoright	Xavier Perez	John J. Robb	David R. Hughes	5 1/2 F	1:04.22	$82,500
2023	Gold Sweep	Jose Ortiz	Steve Asmussen	Mike McCarty	5 1/2 F	1:03.47	$82,500
2022	Two Of A Kind	Luis Saez	Brian A. Lynch	K and R Racing Stable & Town Branch Racing	5 1/2 F	1:04.35	$82,500
2021	Overbore	Joel Rosario	Wesley A. Ward	Peter Leidel	5 1/2 F	1:05.44	$82,500
2019	Fore Left	Mario Gutierrez	Doug O'Neill	Reddam Racing	5 1/2 F	1:04.44	$87,000
2018	Our Braintrust	Javier Castellano	Cathal A. Lynch	Cathal A. Lynch & Stanton J. Smith Jr.	5 1/2 F	1:04.41	$90,000
2017	He Hate Me	Ricardo Santana Jr.	Horacio DePaz	Sagamore Farm Stable	5 1/2 F	1:04.47	$90,000
2016	Silver Mission	John Velazquez	Todd Pletcher	Twin Creeks Racing Stables LLC	5 1/2 F	1:03.78	$120,000
2015	Cocked and Loaded	Irad Ortiz Jr.	Larry Rivelli	Richard Ravin/Patricia's Hope LLC	5 1/2 F	1:04.17	$150,000
2014	Bessie's Boy	John Velazquez	Wesley A. Ward	Ice Wine Stable	5 1/2 F	1:03.89	$60,000
2009	– 2013	Race not held					
2008	Dagnabit	Cornelio Velásquez	Richard E. Dutrow Jr.	Lansdon Robbins III & Thomas Hansen	5 1/2 F	1:06.68	$64,380
2007	Readys Image	John Velazquez	Todd Pletcher	James T. Scatuorchio	5 1/2 F	1:02.86	$66,360
2006	Out of Gwedda	John Velazquez	Todd Pletcher	Pegasus Dream Stable	5 1/2 F	1:06.66	$63,720
2005	Henny Hughes	Gary Stevens	Patrick L. Biancone	Gulf Coast Farms & Martin L. Cherry	5 1/2 F	1:03.67	$64,620
2004	Gold Joy	Michael Luzzi	Tim Salzman	Ken Taylor & John Salzman Sr.	5 1/2 F	1:04.80	$62,940
2003	Heckle	John Velazquez	Todd Pletcher	Dogwood Stable	5 1/2 F	1:04.60	$66,120
2002	Zavata	Jerry D. Bailey	Patrick L. Biancone	Michael B. Tabor	5 1/2 F	1:02.60	$63,960
2001	Buster's Daydream	John Velazquez	Timothy Tullock	S J Bee Stable	5 1/2 F	1:03.80	$63,780
2000	City Zip	José A. Santos	Linda L. Rice	Thompson & Bowling	5 1/2 F	1:03.80	$64,320
1999	More Than Ready	John Velazquez	Todd Pletcher	James T. Scatuorchio	5 1/2 F	1:02.56	$65,040
1998	Tactical Cat	Jerry D. Bailey	D. Wayne Lukas	Overbrook Farm	5 1/2 F	1:03.33	$50,400
1997	Time Limit	Joe Bravo	D. Wayne Lukas	Overbrook Farm	5 1/2 F	1:06.65	$32,100
1996	Kelly Kip	Jean-Luc Samyn	H. Allen Jerkens	Hobeau Farm	5 1/2 F	1:04.60	$33,210
1995	Rosie Ogreta	José A. Santos	Linda L. Rice	RFT Roses Stable	5 1/2 F	1:07.32	$32,400
1994	De Niro	Eddie Maple	H. Allen Jerkens	Peter M. Brant	5 1/2 F	1:05.05	$63,240
1993	Distinct Reality	Jerry D. Bailey	Stanley M. Hough	Beatrice Oxenberg	5 1/2 F	1:04.76	$67,470
1992	England Expects	Jerry D. Bailey	MacKenzie Miller	Rokeby Stable	5 1/2 F	1:03.20	$69,900
1991	Salt Lake	Randy Romero	D. Wayne Lukas	Mabee Family Trust	5 1/2 F	1:03.16	$68,190
1990	Hansel	Randy Romero	Frank L. Brothers	Lazy Lane Farms	5 1/2 F	1:04.40	$67,650
1989	Eternal Flight	Randy Romero	LeRoy Jolley	Nedlaw Stable	5 1/2 F	1:06.00	$53,640
1988	Mr. Sea Sanders	Jorge Velásquez	Patrick B. Byrne	Petelaine Stable	6 F	1:11.40	$53,730
1987	Morgan's Levee	Robbie Davis	George R. Arnold II	Loblolly Stable	6 F	1:11.40	$42,600
1986	Gulch	Ángel Cordero Jr.	LeRoy Jolley	Peter M. Brant	6 F	1:10.40	$40,620
1985	Sovereign Don	Jorge Velásquez	D. Wayne Lukas	Eugene V. Klein	6 F	1:13.60	$42,355
1984	Beat Me Daddy	Eddie Maple	Robert L. Wheeler	Napton Hill Farm	6 F	1:12.20	$40,140
1983	Track Barron	Jean Cruguet	LeRoy Jolley	Peter M. Brant	6 F	1:10.40	$33,840
1982	Laus' Cause	Jorge Tejeira	Reynaldo H. Nobles	Robert E. Brennan	6 F	1:10.20	$32,760
1981	Regal Stone	Jorge Velásquez	Jose A. Martin	Flying Zee Stable	6 F	1:10.40	$34,740
1980	Golden Derby	Darrel McHargue	Smiley Adams	Frederick Lehmann	6 F	1:11.40	$33,720
1979	Speedup	Ángel Cordero Jr.	Edward I. Kelly Sr.	Brookfield Farm	6 F	1:11.80	$25,950
1978	Tim The Tiger	Ángel Cordero Jr.	John M. Veitch	Calumet Farm	6 F	1:10.00	$22,485
1977	Alydar	Eddie Maple	John M. Veitch	Calumet Farm	6 F	1:10.00	$21,975
1976	Turn of Coin	Ángel Cordero Jr.	William O. Hicks	William O. Hicks	6 F	1:12.40	$22,590
1975	Bold Forbes	Laffit Pincay Jr.	Laz Barrera	E. Rodriguez Tizol	6 F	1:09.40	$16,170
1974	Foolish Pleasure	Chuck Baltazar	LeRoy Jolley	John L. Greer	6 F	1:10.80	$17,280
1973	Raise A Cup	Chuck Baltazar	Reggie Cornell	Calumet Farm	5 1/2 F	1:03.60	$16,800
1972	Linda's Chief	Braulio Baeza	Alfred Scotti	Neil Hellman	5 1/2 F	1:03.60	$16,545
1971	Chauffeur	Eddie Belmonte	Frank "Pancho" Martin	Sigmund Sommer	5 1/2 F	1:04.40	$25,200
1970	Raise Your Glass (DH)	Jorge Velásquez	MacKenzie Miller	Cragwood Stables	5 1/2 F	1:05.00	$15,597
1970	Tamtent (DH)	Eddie Belmonte	Angel Penna Sr.	Gedney Farm	5 1/2 F	1:05.00	$15,597
1969	Very High	Fernando Toro	Harold H. Goodwin	William P. Minnotte	5 1/2 F	1:05.20	$22,603
1968	Buck Run	Heliodoro Gustines	John M. Gaver Sr.	Greentree Stable	5 1/2 F	1:03.20	$22,051
1967	Wise Exchange	Ron Turcotte	Hirsch Jacobs	Isidor Bieber	5 1/2 F	1:04.40	$22,961
1966	Successor	Braulio Baeza	Edward A. Neloy	Wheatley Stable	5 1/2 F	1:04.20	$23,952
1965	Buckpasser	Braulio Baeza	William C. Winfrey	Ogden Phipps	5 1/2 F	1:03.80	$22,344
1964	Bold Lad	Manuel Ycaza	Edward A. Neloy	Wheatley Stable	5 1/2 F	1:06.20	$24,473
1963	Chieftain	Bill Hartack	Frank Y. Whiteley Jr.	Powhatan Stable	5 1/2 F	1:04.40	$23,005
1962	Bonjour	Manuel Ycaza	Hirsch Jacobs	Patrice Jacobs	5 1/2 F	1:04.00	$24,488
1961	Clover Leaf	Robert Ussery	James P. Conway	Mrs. J. W. Galbreath	5 1/2 F	1:05.00	$24,488
1960	Hail To Reason	Robert Ussery	Hirsch Jacobs	Patrice Jacobs	5 1/2 F	1:05.00	$24,295
1959	Vital Force	Bill Hartack	Wilma Kennedy	Tinkham Veale II	5 1/2 F	1:05.20	$23,092
1958	Restless Wind	Eddie Arcaro	Horatio Luro	Llangollen Farm Stable	5 1/2 F	1:04.40	$14,830
1957	Jewel's Reward	Walter Blum	Ivan H. Parke	Maine Chance Farm	5 1/2 F	1:04.80	$16,050
1956	King Hairan	Eddie Arcaro	Leonard H. Hunt	Leo Edwards	5 1/2 F	1:05.00	$14,950
1955	Getthere Jack	Hedley Woodhouse	John J. Weipert Jr.	Lily-Ann Stable	5 1/2 F	1:05.20	$8,450
1954	Right Down	James D. Nichols	Sidney Jacobs	Sidney Jacobs	5 1/2 F	1:05.80	$9,925
1953	Quick Lunch	Nick Wall	James E. Fitzsimmons	Wheatley Stable	5 1/2 F	1:05.60	$10,300
1952	Hilarious	Eric Guerin	James E. Fitzsimmons	Wheatley Stable	5 1/2 F	1:05.40	$9,975
1951	Pintor	Hedley Woodhouse	Dion K. Kerr Jr.	Montpelier Stable	5 1/2 F	1:05.40	$8,450
1950	Battlefield	Eddie Arcaro	Winbert F. Mulholland	George D. Widener Jr.	5 1/2 F	1:05.00	$9,625
1949	Fox Time	Eric Guerin	James W. Healy	Vera S. Bragg	5 1/2 F	1:07.80	$9,000
1948	The Admiral	Robert Permane	James E. Fitzsimmons	Ogden Phipps	5 1/2 F	1:05.00	$17,250
1947	Inseparable	Job Dean Jessop	Preston M. Burch	Brookmeade Stable	5 1/2 F	1:05.00	$17,125
1946	Jet Pilot	Eric Guerin	Tom Smith	Maine Chance Farm	5 1/2 F	1:06.80	$9,375
1945	Degage	Conn McCreary	Sherrill W. Ward	Russell A. Firestone	5 1/2 F	1:05.00	$7,370
1944	Burg-El-Arab	Ted Atkinson	Sylvester E. Veitch	C. V. Whitney	5 1/2 F	1:05.80	$7,755
1943	Lucky Draw	Conn McCreary	Winbert F. Mulholland	George D. Widener Jr.	5 1/2 F	1:05.80	$5,150
1942	Supermont	John Gilbert	Richard E. Handlen	Foxcatcher Farm	5 1/2 F	1:05.80	$6,400
1941	Requested	Alfred Robertson	J. H. "Blackie" McCoole	Ben F. Whitaker	5 1/2 F	1:05.40	$6,200
1940	Chicuelo	Ralph Eccard	Hugh Dufford	Elizabeth Arden	5 1/2 F	1:05.40	$4,500
1939	Gannet	Ronnie Nash	Jack Howard	Ben F. Whitaker	5 F	0:58.60	$4,125
1938	Maeline	Jack Westrope	George E. Phillips	Maemere Farm	5 F	0:59.00	$4,250
1937	Perpetuate	James Stout	George M. Odom	Robert L. Gerry Sr.	5 F	0:59.00	$4,750
1936	Airflame	Sam Renick	Joseph H. Stotler	Alfred G. Vanderbilt II	5 F	0:59.80	$4,650
1933	– 1935	Race not held					
1932	Balios	Hank Mills	James E. Fitzsimmons	Henry C. Phipps	6 F	1:13.00	$8,050
1931	Economic	Frank Catrone	Clarence Buxton	Jerome H. Louchheim	6 F	1:13.60	$11,150
1930	Polydorus	Laverne Fator	Bennett W. Creech	William R. Coe	6 F	1:14.00	$12,300
1929	Sarazen	Willie Garner	Max Hirsch	Fair Stable	6 F	1:14.80	$13,550
1928	Jack High	Linus McAtee	A. Jack Joyner	George D. Widener Jr.	6 F	1:13.00	$12,050
1927	Diavolo	Earl Sande	James E. Fitzsimmons	Wheatley Stable	6 F	1:12.20	$11,200
1926	Draconia	John Maiben	Henry McDaniel	Gifford A. Cochran	6 F	1:12.80	$11,300
1925	Flight of Time	John Maiben	Thomas J. Healey	Walter J. Salmon Sr.	6 F	1:13.00	$7,600
1924	Young Martin	Earl Sande	William S. Walker	John E. Madden	6 F	1:13.80	$7,600
1923	Transmute	Linus McAtee	James G. Rowe Sr.	Harry P. Whitney	6 F	1:12.60	$7,600
1922	Martingale	Clarence Kummer	William M. Garth	Joshua S. Cosden	6 F	1:12.40	$7,600
1921	Olympus	Clarence Kummer	James G. Rowe Sr.	Harry P. Whitney	6 F	1:13.60	$7,600
1920	Inchcape	Albert Johnson	Fred Burlew	John H. Rosseter	6 F	1:12.00	$5,400
1919	Man o' War	Johnny Loftus	Louis Feustel	Glen Riddle Farm	6 F	1:13.00	$4,800
1918	Lord Brighton	Lawrence Lyke	George M. Odom	Brighton Stable	6 F	1:12.80	$5,800
1917	Gold Tassel	A. Collins	William S. Walker	John E. Madden	6 F	1:12.40	$5,250
1916	Ticket	James Butwell	A. J. Goldsborough	Andrew Miller	6 F	1:13.40	$3,900
1915	Tea Caddy	Clarence Turner	Samuel C. Hildreth	August Belmont Jr.	6 F	1:15.00	$2,325
1914	Ed Crump	James Butwell	John F. Schorr	John W. Schorr	6 F	1:15.20	$1,925
1913	Race not held						
1912	No races held due to the Hart–Agnew Law.						
1911	No races held due to the Hart–Agnew Law.						
1910	Footprint	Eddie Dugan	John Whalen	August Belmont Jr.	5 3/4 F	1:11.20	$6,480
1909	Waldo	David L. Nicol	Raleigh Colston	Charles L. Harrison	5 3/4 F	1:11.60	$1,925
1908	Fayette	Walter Miller	John E. Madden	John E. Madden	5 3/4 F	1:09.60	$12,500
1907	King James	Herman Radtke	John E. Madden	John E. Madden	5 3/4 F	1:13.40	$13,200
1906	Water Pearl	Joe Jones	A. Jack Joyner	Sydney Paget	5 3/4 F	1:12.00	$10,200
1905	Bohemian	Lucien Lyne	James G. Rowe Sr.	James R. Keene	5 3/4 F	1:10.60	$9,500
1904	Merry Lark	Jack H. Martin	Thomas Welsh	William B. Leeds	5 3/4 F	1:10.80	$9,800
1903	Magistrate	John Bullman	John J. Hyland	August Belmont Jr.	5 3/4 F	1:13.80	$7,300
1902	Artvis	Samuel Doggett	Green B. Morris	Green B. Morris	5 3/4 F	1:12.00	$9,910
1901	Whiskey King	George M. Odom	Charles Davis	The Pepper Stable	5 3/4 F	1:10.80	$7,750
1900	Blues	Danny Maher	Thomas Welsh	C. Fleishchmann's Sons	6 F	1:15.80	$7,750
1899	Maribert	Danny Maher	Thomas Welsh	C. Fleishchmann's Sons	6 F	1:15.00	$12,645
1898	Jean Bereaud	Tod Sloan	Samuel C. Hildreth	Sydney Paget	6 F	1:15.00	$8,895
1897	Handball	Willie Simms	Frank McCabe	Philip J. Dwyer	6 F	1:15.25	$7,750
1896	Don de Oro	Henry Griffin	John J. Hyland	Blemton Stable	6 F	1:15.00	$8,525
1895	Handspring	Samuel Doggett	Frank McCabe	Philip J. Dwyer	6 F	1:15.00	$7,800
1894	Gotham	Edward H. Garrison	John Campbell	Jacob Ruppert Jr.	6 F	1:15.75	$5,640
1893	Dobbins	John Lamley	Hardy Campbell Jr.	Richard Croker	6 F	1:16.50	$5,620
1892	Don Alonzo	Samuel Doggett	Matthew M. Allen	Frank A. Ehret	6 F	1:17.50	$5,740
1891	Spinalong	Fred Littlefield	R. Wyndham Walden	J. A. & A. H. Morris	6 F	1:18.25	$7,280
1890	Chatham	Edward H. Garrison	R. Wyndham Walden	J. A. & A. H. Morris	6 F	1:15.75	$6,400
1889	Padishah	Edward H. Garrison	James G. Rowe Sr.	August Belmont Sr.	6 F	1:16.00	$6,620
1888	Oregon	Jim McLaughlin	Frank McCabe	Dwyer Brothers Stable	6 F	1:22.75	$4,560
1887	Guarantee	William Fitzpatrick	Matthew Byrnes	J. B. A. Haggin	6 F	1:15.25	$2,605

- In 1970 there was a Dead heat for the win.
