= Sheepshead Bay Stakes =

- Class: Grade III
- Location: Belmont Park; Elmont, New York, United States
- Inaugurated: First: 1888–1910 (as Sheepshead Bay Handicap at Sheepshead Bay Race Track); Renewal: 1957 (at Jamaica Race Course)
- Race type: Thoroughbred – Flat racing
- Website: NYRA

Race information
- Distance: 1 3/8 miles (11 furlongs)
- Surface: Turf
- Track: Left-handed
- Qualification: Fillies & Mares, four-years-old and older
- Weight: 124 lbs with allowances
- Purse: $200,000 (since 2012)

The Sheepshead Bay Stakes is a Grade III American thoroughbred horse race for fillies and mares ages four-years-old and older run over a distance of one and three-eighth miles on the turf scheduled annually in early May at Belmont Park in Elmont, New York.

== History ==
The first Sheepshead Bay Handicap was a race run from 1888 through 1910 at the now defunct Sheepshead Bay Race Track at Sheepshead Bay, New York. When the Sheepshead Bay Race Track closed the event was discontinued.

=== Renewal Sheepshead Bay Handicap (1957–) ===
The event was revived at the Jamaica Race Course on 26 October 1957 as a six furlong sprint named the Sheepshead Bay Handicap for three-year-olds and older and was won by Be Jeepers in a time 1:11 2/5 The event was not held in 1958. In 1959 the event was held at Jamaica Race Course for the last time in mid July at a distance of 1 1/8 miles and was won by the 40-1 longshot Greek Star. With the closure of the Jamaica Race Course the event was transferred to Aqueduct Racetrack and held on the new turf track. In 1962 the conditions of the event were change that the event was for fillies and mares three-years-old or older. The event was scheduled to be run on the turf track but was transferred to the dirt and held over a distance of one mile due to cancellation of all turf racing for the rest of their summer meeting after an incident the previous Saturday.

In 1963 the distance of the event was reduced to 1 1/16 miles and was won by the reigning U.S. Champion Three-Year-Old Filly Cicada who carried an imposing weight of 128 pounds winning by a neck over Nubile. Cicada would later be crowned the 1963 U.S. Champion Older Female Horse.

In 1965 the distance of the event was increased to 1 3/16 miles and was run until 1974 at that journey. The event continued to be held in July during Aqueduct's short summer meeting.

The Sheepshead Bay was run in two divisions five times, four times at Aqueduct and after the event was moved permanently to Belmont Park in 1982. In the running of the Second Division of the event in 1970 the winner Pattee Canyon carried a record 132 pounds.

In 1973 the first year the classification system was enacted, the event was set with Grade II status.

The 1974 running was moved of the turf after a week of prolonged wet weather. In 1975 the event was held at Belmont Park over a distance of 1 1/4 miles.

In 1976 the event was held back at Aqueduct at a distance of 1 1/8 miles and US Hall of Fame jockey Pat Day won both divisions of the event - On Glowing Tribute and Fleet Victress. In 1977 the event was moved to Belmont Park where it has been held since. Glowing Tribute won the event again ridden by US Hall of Fame jockey Jorge Velásquez setting a new track record for the 1 1/4 miles in 1:59 3/5.

In 1980 the distance was increased to the current 1 3/8 miles.

In 1983 Henryk de Kwiatkowski's owned and trained by the US Hall of Fame trainer Woody Stephens Sabin won this event as a three-year-old filly. Sabin won the following year carrying 125 pounds to victory.

In 1990 the event was moved off the turf and was downgraded to Grade III. It held this classification status until 1995 when it was upgraded back to Grade II.

In 1997 Maxzene set a new stakes record in winning in 2:11.57 which stands today. The 2003 longshot winner Mariensky ridden John R. Velazquez by won the event by a record of 8 1/4 lengths on a soft track in a slow time of 2:28.19. In 2009 the conditions of the event were changed from handicap to stakes allowance and the name of the event was modified to the Sheepshead Bay Stakes.

In 2014 the conditions of the event were changed so that three-year-old fillies would not be allowed to enter.

In 2020 due to the COVID-19 pandemic in the United States, NYRA did not schedule the event.

In 2024 the event was downgraded by the Thoroughbred Owners and Breeders Association to Grade III status. Also the event in 2024 was moved to Aqueduct Racetrack due to infield tunnel and redevelopment work at Belmont Park.

=== Records ===
Speed record:

- 1 3/8 miles – 2:11.57 Maxzene (1997)
- 1 1/4 miles – 1:59.60 Glowing Tribute (1977)
- 1 3/16 miles – 1:54.80 Indian Sunlite (1967), Ludham (IRE) (1968)

Margins:

- 8 1/4 lengths – Mariensky (2003)

Most wins:

- 2 – Princess Pout (1970, 1971)
- 2 – Glowing Tribute (1976, 1977)
- 2 – Sabin (1983, 1984)
- 2 – Maxzene (1997, 1998)
- 2 – Honey Ryder (2006, 2007)
- 2 – Sea Calisi (2016, 2017)

Most wins by an owner:

- 4 – Darby Dan Farm & John W. Phillips (1973, 1987, 1989, 1999)

Most wins by a jockey:

- 5 – Mike E. Smith (1991, 1993, 1997, 1999, 2004)

Most wins by a trainer:

- 7 – Chad C. Brown (2015, 2016, 2017, 2019, 2022, 2023, 2024)

=== Winners ===
Year	Winner	Age	Jockey	Trainer	Owner	Distance	Time	Purse	Grade	Ref
At Aqueduct – 'Sheepshead Bay Stakes
2026	No Show Sammy Jo (GB)	6	Jorge Ruiz	H. Graham Motion	Newstead Stables	1 3/8 miles	2:19.67	$169,750	III	
2025	Bellezza (IRE)	4	Jaime Rodriguez	Christophe Clement	Moyglare Stud Farm	1 3/8 miles	2:18.29	$169,750	III	
2024	Royalty Interest (FR)	4	Eric Cancel	Chad C. Brown	Klaravich Stables	1 3/8 miles	2:18.05	$194,000	III	
At Belmont Park
2023	Higher Truth (IRE)	5	Manuel Franco	Chad C. Brown	Team Hanley, Jeff Drown, & Michael J. Ryan	1 3/8 miles	2:23.57	$186,000	II	
2022	Virginia Joy (GER)	5	Trevor McCarthy	Chad C. Brown	Peter M. Brant	1 3/8 miles	2:30.88	$186,000	II	
2021	Magic Attitude (GB)	4	Trevor McCarthy	Arnaud Delacour	Lael Stables	1 3/8 miles	2:14.32	$200,000	II	
2020	Race not held									
2019	Santa Monica (GB)	4	Joe Bravo	Chad C. Brown	R Unicorn Stable	1 3/8 miles	2:26.70	$194,000	II	
2018	Holy Helena	4	Manuel Franco	James A. Jerkens	Stronach Stables	1 3/8 miles	2:15.15	$200,000	II	
2017	Sea Calisi (FR)	5	Irad Ortiz Jr.	Chad C. Brown	Martin S. Schwartz	1 3/8 miles	2:16.83	$200,000	II	
2016	Sea Calisi (FR)	4	Jose L. Ortiz	Chad C. Brown	Martin S. Schwartz	1 3/8 miles	2:18.90	$200,000	II	
2015	Rosalind	4	Joe Bravo	Chad C. Brown	Bethlehem Stables, Michael Dubb & Highclere America	1 3/8 miles	2:14.73	$196,000	II	
2014	Riposte (GB)	4	Joel Rosario	William I. Mott	Juddmonte Farm	1 3/8 miles	2:18.86	$200,000	II	
2013	Tannery (IRE)	4	Luis Saez	Alan E. Goldberg	Richard Santulli	1 3/8 miles	2:20.17	$200,000	II	
2012	Aruna	5	Ramon A. Dominguez	H. Graham Motion	Flaxman Holdings	1 3/8 miles	2:15.47	$200,000	II	
2011	Hibaayeb (GB)	4	John R. Velazquez	Saeed bin Suroor	Godolphin Stable	1 3/8 miles	2:15.92	$150,000	II	
2010	Treat Gently (GB)	5	Kent J. Desormeaux	William I. Mott	Juddmonte Farm	1 3/8 miles	2:14.09	$150,000	II	
2009	Criticism (GB)	5	Javier Castellano	Thomas Albertrani	Darley Stable	1 3/8 miles	2:13.96	$150,000	II	
Sheepshead Bay Handicap
2008	Mauralakana (FR)	5	Kent J. Desormeaux	Christophe Clement	Robert Scarborough	1 3/8 miles	2:14.69	$150,000	II	
2007	Honey Ryder	6	Garrett K. Gomez	Todd A. Pletcher	Glencrest Farm (Lessee)	1 3/8 miles	2:13.00	$150,000	II	
2006	Honey Ryder	5	Garrett K. Gomez	Todd A. Pletcher	Glencrest Farm (Lessee)	1 3/8 miles	2:12.98	$150,000	II	
2005	Sauvage (FR)	4	Javier Castellano	Thomas Albertrani	William Diamant	1 3/8 miles	2:15.65	$150,000	II	
2004	Moscow Burning	4	Mike E. Smith	James M. Cassidy	Jeff Mariani, Michael Nentwig & Dallas Van Kempen	1 3/8 miles	2:18.24	$150,000	II	
2003	Mariensky	4	John R. Velazquez	Christophe Clement	Waterville Lake Stable	1 3/8 miles	2:28.19	$150,000	II	
2002	Tweedside	4	John R. Velazquez	Todd A. Pletcher	Eugene & Laura Melnyk	1 3/8 miles	2:13.63	$150,000	II	
2001	Critical Eye	4	Michael J. Luzzi	Scott M. Schwartz	Herbert T. & Carol A. Schwartz	1 3/8 miles	2:18.18	$150,000	II	Off turf
2000	Lisieux Rose (IRE)	5	Jose A. Santos	Christophe Clement	Moyglare Stud	1 3/8 miles	2:14.16	$150,000	II	
1999	Soaring Softly	4	Mike E. Smith	James J. Toner	Joan G. & John W. Phillips	1 3/8 miles	2:15.11	$150,000	II	
1998	Maxzene	5	Jose A. Santos	Thomas J. Skiffington	Fusao Sekiguchi	1 3/8 miles	2:14.17	$150,000	II	
1997	Maxzene	4	Mike E. Smith	Thomas J. Skiffington	Ken-Mort Stable	1 3/8 miles	2:11.57	$150,000	II	
1996	Chelsey Flower	5	Robbie Davis	Nicholas P. Zito	Farfellow Farm	1 3/8 miles	2:12.64	$112,200	II	
1995	Duda	4	Jerry D. Bailey	William I. Mott	Madeleine A. Paulson	1 3/8 miles	2:13.69	$109,500	II	
1994	Market Booster	5	Jose A. Santos	D. Wayne Lukas	Moyglare Stud	1 3/8 miles	2:11.69	$111,600	III	
1993	Trampoli	4	Mike E. Smith	Christophe Clement	Paul de Moussac	1 3/8 miles	2:14.08	$112,800	III	
1992	§ Ratings	4	Jean Cruguet	Jonathan E. Sheppard	Augustin Stable	1 3/8 miles	2:15.14	$125,000	III	
1991	Crockadore	4	Mike E. Smith	William I. Mott	Timothy Mahony	1 3/8 miles	2:14.80	$119,600	III	
1990	Destiny Dance	4	Jose A. Santos	Flint S. Schulhofer	Mohammed bin Rashid Al Maktoum	1 3/8 miles	2:19.20	$91,800	III	Off turf
1989	Love You by Heart	4	Jean Cruguet	John M. Veitch	Darby Dan Farm	1 3/8 miles	2:12.60	$120,800	II	
1988	Nastique	4	Robbie Davis	Stephen A. DiMauro	Chaus Stable	1 3/8 miles	2:16.40	$118,400	II	
1987	§ Steal a Kiss	4	Eddie Maple	John M. Veitch	Darby Dan Farm	1 3/8 miles	2:23.80	$122,800	II	
1986	Possible Mate	5	Jean-Luc Samyn	Philip G. Johnson	Thomas P. Evans	1 3/8 miles	2:14.00	$125,800	II	
1985	Persian Tiara (IRE)	5	Jorge Velasquez	Adrian J. Maxwell	Mrs. Theodore P. Donahue	1 3/8 miles	2:16.00	$122,000	II	
1984	Sabin	4	Eddie Maple	Woodford C. Stephens	Henryk de Kwiatkowski	1 3/8 miles	2:12.80	$119,800	II	
1983	Sabin	3	Eddie Maple	Woodford C. Stephens	Henryk de Kwiatkowski	1 3/8 miles	2:13.80	$113,200	II	
1982	Castle Royale	4	Jimmy J. Miranda	John P. Campo	Dogwood Stable	1 3/8 miles	2:14.20	$110,100	II	Division 1
1982	Dana Calqui (ARG)	4	Ángel Cordero Jr.	Stephen A. DiMauro	Irwin Feiner	1 3/8 miles	2:13.00	$110,100	II	Division 2
1981	Love Sign	4	Ruben Hernandez	Sidney J. Watters Jr.	Stephen C. Clark Jr.	1 3/8 miles	2:13.00	$112,800	II	
1980	The Very One	5	Charlie Cooke	Stephen A. DiMauro	Helen Polinger	1 3/8 miles	2:13.00	$119,200	II	
1979	Terpsichorist	4	Eddie Maple	Woodford C. Stephens	Hickory Tree Stable	1 1/4 miles	2:01.60	$112,000	II	
1978	Late Bloomer	4	Jorge Velasquez	John M. Gaver Jr.	Greentree Stable	1 1/4 miles	2:01.00	$114,800	II	
1977	Glowing Tribute	4	Jorge Velasquez	MacKenzie Miller	Rokeby Stable	1 1/4 miles	1:59.60	$109,500	II	
At Aqueduct
1976	Glowing Tribute	3	Pat Day	J. Elliott Burch	Rokeby Stable	1 1/8 miles	1:49.20	$84,500	II	Division 1
1976	§ Fleet Victress	4	Pat Day	MacKenzie Miller	Ralph Kercheval	1 1/8 miles	1:49.00	$86,000	II	Division 2
At Belmont Park
1975	Gems And Roses	5	Mike Venezia	Thomas J. Kelly	Townsend B. Martin	1 1/4 miles	2:01.60	$57,900	II	
At Aqueduct
1974	North Broadway	4	Ángel Cordero Jr.	Woodford C. Stephens	Tadao Tamashima	1 3/16 miles	1:56.20	$58,650	II	Off turf
1973	Shearwater	4	Ángel Cordero Jr.	Lou Rondinello	Darby Dan Farm	1 3/16 miles	1:59.80	$59,350	II	
1972	Sydneys Nurse	4	Jacinto Vásquez	Thomas J. Kelly	Brookmeade Stable	1 3/16 miles	1:57.00	$45,850		Division 1
1972	Inca Queen	4	Garth Patterson	George T. Poole	Cornelius Vanderbilt Whitney	1 3/16 miles	1:56.40	$46,350		Division 2
1971	Princess Pout	5	Jean Cruguet	D. Mike Smithwick	June H. McKnight	1 3/16 miles	1:56.60	$58,900		
1970	Princess Pout	4	Jean Cruguet	D. Mike Smithwick	June H. McKnight	1 3/16 miles	1:56.40	$45,600		Division 1
1970	Pattee Canyon	5	John L. Rotz	Stanley M. Rieser	Barbara Hunter	1 3/16 miles	1:57.40	$45,600		Division 2
1969	Symona II (IRE)	3	Jorge Velasquez	Angel Penna Sr.	Gustave Ring	1 3/16 miles	1:55.80	$59,200		
1968	Ludham (IRE)	4	Jacinto Vásquez	Frank I. Wright	Happy Hill Farm	1 3/16 miles	1:54.80	$46,800		Division 1
1968	Politely	5	Ángel Cordero Jr.	George M. Baker	Bohemia Stable	1 3/16 miles	1:55.40	$46,300		Division 2
1967	Indian Sunlite	4	Heliodoro Gustines	Sherrill W. Ward	George M. Humphrey	1 3/16 miles	1:54.80	$57,600		
1966	§ Straight Deal	4	Walter Blum	Hirsch Jacobs	Ethel D. Jacobs	1 3/16 miles	1:55.40	$57,100		
1965	Snow Scene II (ARG)	5	Braulio Baeza	Thomas J. Kelly	Esther D. du Pont	1 3/16 miles	1:56.80	$58,100		
1964	Intervene	4	Manuel Ycaza	William H. Dixon	Baird C. Brittingham	1 1/16 miles	1:46.40	$29,900		
1963	Cicada	4	Larry Adams	Casey Hayes	Meadow Stable	1 1/16 miles	1:42.40	$28,050		
1962	Rose O'Neill	4	Manuel Ycaza	Ted Saladin	Bert W. Martin	1 mile	1:34.20	$28,700		Off turf
1961	Wolfram	5	Ismael Valenzuela	Burley Parke	Harbor View Farm	1 1/8 miles	1:50.60	$28,200		3YO+
1960	Tharp	6	Raymond York	Lucien Laurin	Carleton H. Palmer	1 1/8 miles	1:49.00	$29,550		3YO+
At Jamaica Race Course
1959	Greek Star	4	Hedley Woodhouse	Charles V. Reynolds	Sidney M. Barton	1 1/16 miles	1:42.20	$27,950		3YO+
1958	Race not held									
1957	By Jeepers	4	Jimmy Combest	A. Nicholas Combest	Copalan Stable	6 furlongs	1:11.40	$15,000		3YO+

Legend:
Dirt Turf
Notes:
§ Ran as an entry

== Initial Sheepshead Bay Handicap (1888–1910) ==
The original Sheepshead Bay Handicap was open to horses age three and older and was contested on dirt at a distance of one mile (8 furlongs). It was last run in June 1910 after the Republican controlled New York Legislature under Governor Charles Evans Hughes passed the Hart–Agnew anti-betting legislation on June 11, 1908. The owners of Sheepshead Bay Race Track, and other racing facilities in New York State, struggled to stay in business without betting. However, further restrictive legislation was passed by the New York Legislature in 1910 which resulted in the deepening of the financial crisis for track operators and led to a complete shut down of racing across the state during 1911 and 1912. When a Court ruling saw racing return in 1913 it was too late for the Sheepshead Bay facility and it never reopened.

=== Historical notes ===
Sir Walter finished third in the two editions of the race when it was won by Don Alonzo in 1894 and the following year by future U.S. Racing Hall of Fame inductee, Domino. In 1900, another future Hall of Fame inductee, Imp, finished third to longshot winner Greyfeld. A third future Hall of Fame inductee, the great filly Maskette, ran second to King James in the final edition in 1910.

=== Records ===
Speed record:

- 1:37.60 – Inquisitor (1906) & King James (1910)

Most wins:

- No horse won this race more than once.

Most wins by a jockey:

- 3 – Fred Taral (1895, 1896, 1898)
- 3 – Walter Miller (1905, 1906, 1908)

Most wins by an owner:

- No owner won this event more than once.

=== Winners ===
Year	Winner	Age	Jockey	Trainer	Owner	Dist. (Miles)	Time
1910	King James	4	Carroll Shilling	Sam Hildreth	Sam Hildreth	1 m	1:37.60
1909	Sir John Johnson	4	James Butler Jr.	David Woodford	Beverwyck Stable	1 m	1:39.20
1908	Dandelion	6	Walter Miller	John E. Madden	Francis R. Hitchcock	1 m	1:37.80
1907	Sir Lynnewood	6	Monte Preston	L. Webster	Joseph E. Widener	1 m	1:40.60
1906	Inquisitor	3	Walter Miller	Thomas Welsh	Newcastle Stable	1 m	1:37.60
1905	Woodsaw	3	Walter Miller	A. Jack Joyner	Sydney Paget	1 m	1:42.00
1904	Graziallo	3	Jack Martin	E. H. Hanna	Columbia Stable	1 m	1:38.80
1903	Blues	5	John J. Hoar	Frank D. Weir	Frank Farrell	1 m	1:42.00
1902	Kamara	5	Arthur Redfern	Charles F. Hill	Clarence H. Mackay	1 m	1:38.60
1901	Brigadier	4	Winfield O'Connor	John J. Hyland	August Belmont Jr.	1 m	1:37.80
1900	Greyfeld	4	William Dangman	Robert Augustus Smith	Robert Augustus Smith	1 m	1:41.80
1899	Fly By Night	3	John Bullman	Albert Simons	Patrick Dunne	1 m	1:39.80
1898	Semper Ego	5	Fred Taral	Charles Hughes	Bromley & Co.	1 m	1:42.00
1897	Havoc	5	Henry Lewis	Charles Boyle	Joseph E. Seagram	1 m	1:41.00
1896	St. Maxim	5	Fred Taral	Robert Tucker	Charles Fleischmann & Sons	1 m	1:40.20
1895	Domino	4	Fred Taral	William Lakeland	James & Foxhall Keene	1 m	1:41.20
1894	Don Alonzo	4	Willie Simms	Hardy Campbell Jr.	Michael F. Dwyer	1 m	1:41.00

=== Earlier winners ===
- 1893 – Pickpocket
- 1892 – Tournament
- 1891 – Ridge Morrow
- 1890 – Loantaka
- 1889 – King Crab
- 1888 – Terra Cotta

== See also ==
- List of American and Canadian Graded races
