= Water Pearl =

American Thoroughbred racehorse

- Sire: Watercress
- Grandsire: Springfield
- Dam: Pearl V.
- Damsire: Salvator
- Sex: Stallion
- Foaled: 1904
- Country: United States
- Color: Chestnut
- Breeder: James B. A. Haggin
- Owner: Sydney Paget; Sydney Paget & Edward R. Thomas (1906-07-10)
- Trainer: A. Jack Joyner
- Record: 10: 5-2-0
- Earnings: US$42,560

Major wins
- Double Event Stakes (1906); Eclipse Stakes (1906); Great American Stakes (1906); Tremont Stakes (1909)

Water Pearl (1904 - 1907) was an American Thoroughbred racehorse that won four important stakes races as a two-year-old in 1906 but whose promising career came to an end when he died from an illness on March 10, 1907, in his stall at Sheepshead Bay Race Track.

== Background ==
Water Pearl was a well bred colt sired by the English stallion Watercress, a winner of top races including the 1892 Prince of Wales's Stakes and the 1893 Hardwicke Stakes for trainer John Porter. Watercress was purchased by the prominent American horseman James B. A. Haggin who brought him to the United States in 1894 to stand at his breeding operations in California and later in Kentucky. Among his other progeny, Watercress sired the 1903 U.S. Champion Older Male Horse Waterboy who set a World Record of 2:03 1/5 for 1 1/4 miles on dirt in the Brighton Handicap.

Springfield was the sire of Watercress. He was a successful runner in England who won 14 consecutive races and at stud would become the grandsire of two English Triple Crown winners: Galtee More and Rock Sand, the latter brought to the United States where he became the grandsire of the legendary Man o' War.

Water Pearl's dam was Pearl V., a daughter of Salvator who was a two-time American Horse of the Year and U.S. Racing Hall of Fame inductee. Pearl V.'s dam was the great Firenze, a four-time National Champion racemare and a Hall of Fame inductee.

== Racing career ==
Race conditioned by future Hall of Fame trainer Jack Joyner, Water Pearl made his first start on May 16, 1906, at Belmont Park, finishing unplaced. He won his next start in a Belmont purse race on May 28. He then won that track's June 6 Eclipse Stakes and followed up with two wins at Gravesend Race Track, taking the Great American Stakes and the Tremont Stakes. He then ran second to Ballot in Part 1 of the Double Event Stakes.

On July 10, 1906, New York businessman Edward R. Thomas paid Sidney Paget $50,000 for a half-interest in Water Pearl and another successful two-year-old, Paget's very speedy Charles Edward. The next day the new racing partnership watched Water Pearl win Part 2 of the Double Event Stakes. In his next outing on June 30 Water Pearl ran second to Oran in the Great Trial Stakes with Ballot in third. Oran was a horse that Water Pearl had defeated in winning Part 2 of the Double Event Stakes.

Illness then kept Water Pearl from racing and he did not run in the rich Belmont Futurity Stakes at Sheepshead Bay. In early September his trainer reported he was training satisfactorily after returning from the long layoff. On his return to racing, Water Pearl ran unplaced in two outings and was returned to rest until the racing beginning of the 1907 racing season.

Three-year-old Water Pearl did not return to racing and died from acute inflammation of the bowels on March 10, 1907.

== Pedigree ==
Pedigree of Water Pearl, chestnut colt, 1904
Sire Watercress	Springfield	St. Albans	Stockwell
Sire Watercress	Springfield	St. Albans	Bribery
Sire Watercress	Springfield	Viridis	Marsyas
Sire Watercress	Springfield	Viridis	Maid of Palmyra
Sire Watercress	Wharfedale	Hermit	Newminster
Sire Watercress	Wharfedale	Hermit	Seclusion
Sire Watercress	Wharfedale	Bonnie Doon	Rapid Rhone
Sire Watercress	Wharfedale	Bonnie Doon	Queen Mary
Dam Pearl V.	Salvator	Prince Charlie	Blair Athol
Dam Pearl V.	Salvator	Prince Charlie	Eastern Princess
Dam Pearl V.	Salvator	Salina	Lexington
Dam Pearl V.	Salvator	Salina	Lightsome
Dam Pearl V.	Firenze	Glenelg	Citadel
Dam Pearl V.	Firenze	Glenelg	Babta
Dam Pearl V.	Firenze	Florida	Virgil
Dam Pearl V.	Firenze	Florida	Florence (family: 10-c)
