= Rosebuds Stakes =

- Location: Sheepshead Bay Race Track, Sheepshead Bay, Brooklyn, New York, United States
- Inaugurated: 1898
- Race type: Thoroughbred – Flat racing

Race information
- Distance: 5 furlongs
- Surface: Dirt
- Track: left-handed
- Qualification: 2yo fillies

The Rosebuds Stakes at Sheepshead Bay Race Track in Brooklyn, New York City was a Thoroughbred horse race for two-year-old fillies raced on dirt over a distance of five furlongs. Inaugurated in 1898, the event was run twelve times through 1910 when the racetrack closed following passage of the Hart-Agnew Law. This anti-betting legislation by the New York State Legislature under Governor Charles Evans Hughes led to a complete shutdown of racing in 1911 and 1912 in the state.

The loss of income from wagering, left racetrack operators no choice but to drastically reduce the purse money being paid out which resulted in the purse for the Rosebuds Stakes being cut in 1908 to one-quarter of what it had been in recent years. These small purses made horse racing unprofitable and impossible for even the most successful horse owners to continue in business.

A noted winner of the Rosebuds Stakes was Astarita who won it in 1902. Her career would result in the Astarita Stakes, created in 1946 at Aqueduct Racetrack, being named in her honor.

There was no Rosebuds Stakes run in 1909 and then on June 20, 1910 its final edition took place. Although a February 21, 1913 ruling by the New York Supreme Court, Appellate Division saw horse racing return in 1913, it was too late for the Sheepshead Bay horse racing facility and it never reopened.

== Records ==
Speed Record:

- 5 furlongs: 0:59.60 – Running Water (1905)

Most wins by a jockey:

- 2 – Patrick A. McCue (1899, 1900)
- 2 – Guy Garner (1908, 1910)

Most wins by a trainer:

- to be determined

Most wins by an owner:

- 2 – John Daly (1899, 1900)

== Winners ==
Year	Winner	Jockey	Trainer	Owner	Dist. (Furlongs)	Time	Win$
1910	Herodia	Guy Garner	Thomas Welsh	Newcastle Stable	5 F	1:01.00	$490
1909	Race not held due to Hart-Agnew Law						
1908	Fore	Guy Garner	Thomas Welsh	Louis A. Cella	5 F	1:00.40	$450
1907	Notasulga	Herman Radtke	Albert L. Hamel	Henry Brulatour & Albert L. Hamel	5 F	1:00.60	$1,780
1906	Clare Russell	Leroy Williams	William H. Karrick	Oneck Stable	5 F	1:00.40	$1,835
1905	Running Water	Lucien Lyne	Woodford Clay	Woodford Clay	5 F	0:59.60	$1,880
1904	Belle Sauvage	Al B. Cormack	Thomas J. Healey	Richard T. Wilson Jr.	5 F	1:01.60	$2,960
1903	Hamburg Belle	Frank O'Neill	A. Jack Joyner	Sydney Paget (for J.B.A. Haggin)	5 F	0:59.80	$2,285
1902	Astarita	Willie Shaw	Harry M. Mason	John G. Follansbee	5 F	1:01.00	$1,205
1901	Leonora Loring	Winfield O'Connor	William O. Scully	L. M. Myers	5 F	1:00.20	$645
1900	Glennellie	Patrick A. McCue		John Daly	5 F	1:03.00	$630
1899	Affect	Patrick A. McCue	Edward Feakes	John Daly	5 F	1:01.00	$1,210
1898	Onondaga's Pride	Tod Sloan	Julius Bauer	Joseph E. Bromley & Arthur Featherstone	4.5 F	0:56.60	$1,480
