= Brighton Mile =

- Class: Discontinued stakes
- Location: Brighton Beach Race Course, Brighton Beach, Coney Island, New York, United States
- Inaugurated: 1905
- Race type: Thoroughbred – Flat racing

Race information
- Distance: 1 mile (8 furlongs)
- Surface: Dirt
- Track: left-handed
- Qualification: Three-years-old & up
- Weight: Assigned

The Brighton Mile was an American Thoroughbred horse race run between 1905 and 1910 at Brighton Beach Race Course in Brighton Beach, Coney Island, New York. A handicap event for horses age three and older, it was contested on dirt at a distance of one mile (8 furlongs).

Inaugurated in 1905, the Brighton Mile was not run in 1908 and 1909 due to passage of the Hart–Agnew Law. That would turn out to be the last time the event was run as further restrictions were enacted by the New York State Legislature through amendments to the Hart–Agnew Law that shut down all racing in New York in 1911 and 1912 and ended horse racing permanently at the Brighton Beach track.

A final edition of the Brighton Mile was run at Empire City Race Track in Yonkers, New York and was won by Sam Hildreth's King James.

== Records ==
Speed record:

- 1:37.60 : Charles Edward (1907) (new race and track record)

Most wins:

- No horse ever won this race more than once.

Most wins by a jockey:

- No jockey ever won this race more than once.

Most wins by a trainer:

- No trainer ever won this race more than once.

Most wins by an owner:

- No owner ever won this race more than once.

== Winners ==
Year	Winner	Age	Jockey	Trainer	Owner	Dist. (Miles)	Time	Win $
At Empire City Race Track
1910	King James	5	Carroll Shilling	Sam Hildreth	Sam Hildreth	1 m	1:39.60	$1,420
1908	1909	Race not held						
At Brighton Beach
1907	Charles Edward	3	Willie Knapp	Frank M. Taylor	Patchogue Stable (William H. DuBois)	1 m	1:37.60	$3,120
1906	Hamburg Belle	5	Walter Miller	A. Jack Joyner	Sydney Paget	1 m	1:39.00	$3,170
1905	Ort Wells	4	John Sperling	Enoch Wishard	John A. Drake	1 m	1:38.20	$3,085
