= Double Event Stakes =

Defunct American thoroughbred horse race

- Class: Discontinued stakes
- Location: Sheepshead Bay Race Track, Sheepshead Bay, Brooklyn, New York
- Inaugurated: 1889–1910
- Race type: Thoroughbred – Flat racing

Race information
- Distance: Part 1: 1889–1910, 5.5 F Part 2: 1889–1900, 5.75 F & 1901–1910: 6 F
- Surface: Dirt
- Track: left-handed
- Qualification: Two-year-old colts & fillies

The Double Event Stakes was an American Thoroughbred horse race held annually in two parts from 1889 through 1910 at Sheepshead Bay Race Track in Sheepshead Bay, Brooklyn, New York. A race on dirt for two-year-old colts and fillies, the first part was run on the track's opening day in June and at a distance of 5½ furlongs throughout its term. The second part was run in mid July at a distance of 5 3/4 furlongs until 1901 when it was set at six furlongs. Each race originally carried a guaranteed purse of $10,000 and a bonus of $1,000 to the owners of any horse who won both parts.

== Dual winners ==
The Double Event was run for twenty-two years. In its first eight editions from 1889 through 1896, five horses won both parts but in the last fourteen from 1897 through 1910 there were none. Jockey Tod Sloan won both parts in 1898 on two different horses.

Year	Part 1 winners	Part 2 winners
1910	Housemaid	Footprints
1909	Dalmatian	Lovetie
1908	Fayette	Sir Martin Ŧ
1907	Firestone	Stamina
1906	Ballot	Water Pearl
1905	George C. Bennett	Ironsides
1904	Song and Wine	Veto
1903	Aristocracy	Conjurer
1902	Mexican	Whitechapel
1901	Nasturtium Ŧ	Fly Wheel
1900	Tower of Candles	Elkhorn
1899	Prince of Melbourne	Mesmerist Ŧ
1898	Kingdon	Jean Bereaud Ŧ
1897	Bowling Brook	Hamburg Ŧ
1896	Ornament	Ornament
1895	Handspring	Handspring
1894	Keenan	Cesarion
1893	Hornpipe	Hornpipe
1892	Ajax	Corduroy
1891	His Highness Ŧ	Victory
1890	Russell	Russell
1889	Torso	Torso

- Ŧ Denotes those who would be named an American Champion Two-Year-Old of the year.

== Demise of the Double Event Stakes ==
After years of uncertainty, on June 11, 1908 the Republican controlled New York Legislature under Governor Charles Evans Hughes passed the Hart–Agnew anti-betting legislation with penalties allowing for fines and up to a year in prison. The owners of Sheepshead Bay Race Track, and other racing facilities in New York State, struggled to stay in business without income from betting. Racetrack operators had no choice but to drastically reduce the purse money being paid out which resulted in the Double Event offering a purse in 1909 that was one-sixth of what it had been in earlier years. These small purses made horse racing highly unprofitable and impossible for even the most successful horse owners to continue in business. As such, for the 1910 racing season management of the Sheepshead Bay facility dropped some of its minor stakes races and used the purse money to bolster its most important events. The effect was to restore the purse offered for the Double Event to about half of what it had been. Further restrictive legislation was passed by the New York Legislature in 1910 which deepened the financial crisis for track operators and led to a complete shut down of racing across the state during 1911 and 1912. After a 1911 amendment to the law to limit the liability of owners and directors was defeated, every racetrack in New York State shut down. Owners, whose horses of racing age had nowhere to go, began sending them, their trainers and their jockeys to race in England and France. Many horses ended their racing careers there, and a number remained to become an important part of the European horse breeding industry. Thoroughbred Times reported that more than 1,500 American horses were sent overseas between 1908 and 1913 and of them at least 24 were either past, present, or future Champions. When a February 21, 1913 ruling by the New York Supreme Court, Appellate Division saw horse racing return in 1913 it was too late for the Sheepshead Bay horse racing facility and it never reopened.

== Records ==
John Madden was the dominant figure in both parts of the Double Event, winning the most races as both a trainer and as an owner.

=== Part 1 ===
Speed record:

- 5.5 furlongs: 1:04.20 – Nasturtium (1901)

Most wins by a jockey:

- 2 – Marty Bergen (1891, 1892)

Most wins by a trainer:

- 4 – John E. Madden (1899, 1902, 1903, 1908)

Most wins by an owner:

- 3 – John E. Madden (1899, 1903, 1908)

=== Part 2 ===
Speed record:

- 5.75 furlongs: 1:09.60 – Victory (1891)
- 6 furlongs: 1:11.00 – Conjurer (1903) & Footprint (1910)

Most wins by a jockey:

- 3 – Fred Taral (1891, 1892, 1899)

Most wins by a trainer:

- 3 – John E. Madden (1897, 1901, 1908)

Most wins by an owner:

- 3 – James R. Keene (1893, 1902, 1904)
- 3 – John E. Madden (1897, 1901, 1908)

== Part 1 winners ==
Year	Winner	Age	Jockey	Trainer	Owner	Dist. (Furlongs)	Time	Win$
1910	Housemaid	2	A. Thomas	Raleigh Colston Jr.	Charles L. Harrison	5.5 F	1:08.60	$3,265
1909	Dalmatian	2	Vincent Powers	Sam Hildreth	Sam Hildreth	5.5 F	1:08.00	$1,230
1908	Fayette	2	Walter Miller	John E. Madden	John E. Madden	5.5 F	1:07.00	$7,700
1907	Firestone	2	Tommy Sandy	Henry E. Rowell	Thomas H. Williams	5.5 F	1:07.00	$7,700
1906	Ballot	2	Herman Radtke	James G. Rowe Sr.	James R. Keene	5.5 F	1:06.00	$7,700
1905	George C. Bennett	2	Dave Nicol	William E. Phillips	Frederick Cook	5.5 F	1:07.00	$7,700
1904	Song and Wine	2	Frank O'Neill	Fred Burlew	Newton Bennington	5.5 F	1:07.60	$7,700
1903	Aristocracy	2	Charles Connell	John E. Madden	John E. Madden	5.5 F	1:07.80	$5,110
1902	Mexican	2	Tommy Burns	John E. Madden	Clarence Mackay	5.5 F	1:06.20	$3,800
1901	Nasturtium	2	Winfield O'Connor	James J. McLaughlin	Anthony L. Aste	5.5 F	1:04.20	$3,800
1900	Tower of Candles	2	Carl Mitchell	William M. Rogers	J. M. Murphy	5.5 F	1:07.60	$3,825
1899	Prince of Melbourne	2	Frank O'Leary	John E. Madden	John E. Madden	5.5 F	1:08.40	$4,062
1898	Kingdon	2	Tod Sloan	Hardy Campbell Jr.	Michael F. Dwyer	5.5 F	1:09.00	$3,800
1897	Bowling Brook	2	Fred Littlefield	R. Wyndham Walden	John A. & Alfred H. Morris	5.5 F	1:09.20	$3,800
1896	Ornament	2	Alonzo Clayton	Charles T. Patterson	Charles T. Patterson	5.5 F	1:05.40	$3,950
1895	Handspring	2	Samuel Doggett	Frank McCabe	Philip J. Dwyer	5.5 F	1:06.40	$3,950
1894	Keenan	2	Henry Griffin	John J. Hyland	David Gideon	5.5 F	1:08.80	$3,750
1893	Hornpipe	2	Fred Taral	William Lakeland	James R. & Foxhall P. Keene	5.5 F	1:07.00	$3,900
1892	Ajax	2	Marty Bergen	Charles Leighton	Jacob Ruppert	5.5 F	1:07.40	$3,900
1891	His Highness	2	Marty Bergen	John J. Hyland	David Gideon	5.5 F	1:08.00	$3,800
1890	Russell	2	Edward Garrison	R. Wyndham Walden	John A. Morris & Sons	5.5 F	1:10.00	$3,900
1889	Torso	2	George (Spyder) Anderson	Charles Leighton	William L. Scott	5.5 F	1:09.00	$1,900

== Part 2 winners ==
Year	Winner	Age	Jockey	Trainer	Owner	Dist. (Furlongs)	Time	Win$
1910	Footprint	2	George Archibald	John Whalen	August Belmont Jr.	6 F	1:11.00	$3,765
1909	Lovetie	2	Eddie Dugan	Matthew Feakes	Lily A. Livingston	6 F	1:14.00	$1,285
1908	Sir Martin	2	James Lee	John E. Madden	John E. Madden	6 F	1:13.00	$7,700
1907	Stamina	2	George Mountain	John W. Rogers	Harry Payne Whitney	6 F	1:13.40	$7,700
1906	Water Pearl	2	Lucien Lyne	A. Jack Joyner	Sydney Paget & Edward R. Thomas	6 F	1:13.80	$7,700
1905	Ironsides	2	Jack Martin	John Huggins	Herman B. Duryea	6 F	1:14.00	$7,700
1904	Veto	2	Arthur Redfern	James G. Rowe Sr.	James R. Keene	6 F	1:14.00	$7,700
1903	Conjurer	2	George M. Odom	Peter Wimmer	Samuel S. Brown	6 F	1:11.00	$5,110
1902	Whitechapel	2	Willie Shaw	James G. Rowe Sr.	James R. Keene	6 F	1:14.60	$3,800
1901	Fly Wheel	2	Willie Shaw	John E. Madden	John E. Madden	6 F	1:12.20	$3,800
1900	Elkhorn	2	Nash Turner	Sam Hildreth	William C. Whitney	5.75 F	1:12.00	$3,825
1899	Mesmerist	2	Fred Taral	Julius J. Bauer	Bromley & Co. (Joseph E. Bromley & Arthur Featherstone)	5.75 F	1:12.40	$4,062
1898	Jean Bereaud	2	Tod Sloan	Sam Hildreth	Sydney Paget	5.75 F	1:12.20	$3,800
1897	Hamburg	2	Walter Wilhite	John E. Madden	John E. Madden	5.75 F	1:11.20	$3,800
1896	Ornament	2	Edward Garrison	Charles T. Patterson	Charles T. Patterson	5.75 F	1:12.00	$5,200
1895	Handspring	2	Samuel Doggett	Frank McCabe	Philip J. Dwyer	5.75 F	1:13.20	$4,900
1894	Cesarion	2	Samuel Doggett	Byron McClelland	Byron McClelland	5.75 F	1:12.00	$3,750
1893	Hornpipe	2	Edward Garrison	William Lakeland	James R. & Foxhall P. Keene	5.75 F	1:12.20	$4,900
1892	Corduroy	2	Fred Taral	A. Jack Joyner	August Belmont Jr.	5.75 F	1:13.40	$3,800
1891	Victory	2	Fred Taral	William Lakeland	William Lakeland	5.75 F	1:09.60	$3,900
1890	Russell	2	Fred Littlefield	R. Wyndham Walden	John A. & Alfred H. Morris	5.75 F	1:11.20	$5,000
1889	Torso	2	Jim McLaughlin	Charles Leighton	William L. Scott	5.75 F	1:16.40	$7,445
