= National Stallion Stakes =

- Class: Discontinued stakes
- Location: Belmont Park; Aqueduct Racetrack (1963-1967); Morris Park Racecourse (1898-1904)
- Inaugurated: 1898 at Morris Park Racecourse
- Race type: Thoroughbred – Flat racing

Race information
- Distance: 5 furlongs
- Surface: Dirt
- Track: left-handed
- Qualification: Two-year-old colts & geldings

The National Stallion Stakes was an American Thoroughbred horse race held sixty-two times between 1898 and 1971. Inaugurated as the National Stallion Race at Morris Park Racecourse in The Bronx, the event was open to horses of either sex until 1948 when it became a race exclusively for colts and geldings and a National Stallion Stakes (filly division) was created. Contested on dirt at a distance of five furlongs, from 1905 onward it was hosted by Belmont Park in Elmont, New York except for 1963 through 1967 when it was run at Aqueduct Racetrack in South Ozone Park, Queens, New York.

The race was restricted to horses whose sire had been nominated for the race by its owner before the end of the foal's birth year.

== Historical notes ==
The inaugural running of the National Stallion race took place on May 14, 1898, at Morris Park Racecourse and was won by Jean Bereaud who would go on to win the next year's Belmont Stakes.

In his 1907 win, future Hall of Fame inductee Colin set a new track record of 58 seconds flat for five furlongs on dirt.

Hal Price Headley's Jet Master set a new track and North American record in 1951 of 55 4/5 seconds for five furlongs on dirt.

On June 10, 1953, then forty-year-old future Hall of Fame inductee Charlie Whittingham saddled his first stakes winner when Liz Person's Porterhouse won the National Stallion Stakes.

=== Filly winners 1898–1947 ===
In what would be the last year for racing at Morris Park Racecourse, in 1904 Tanya became the first filly to win the National Stallion Stakes during the time it was open to horses of either sex. Tanya went on to become just the second filly to ever win the Belmont Stakes, an American Classic that would eventually be the third leg of the U.S. Triple Crown series. It would be thirty-four years until another filly was victorious in the National Stallion Stakes when New York City restaurateur Henry Lustig's Donita M won the 1938 race. Five years later Henry Lustig would own the third filly to capture the race when in 1943 his Mrs. Ames defeated the gelding Stir Up owned by the powerful Greentree Stable. Sonny Whitney's Enfilade in 1945 was the last filly to win the National Stallion Stakes before the separate division was created.

=== Owners who won both divisions in the same year ===
1961: Christopher Chenery's Meadow Stable won the colt division with Sir Gaylord and the filly division with their future Hall of Fame inductee Cicada.

1964: Wheatley Stable, owned by Gladys Mills Phipps and her brother Ogden L. Mills, won the colt division with Bold Lad and the filly division with Queen Empress.

1971: Calumet Farm won the colt division with Plum Bold and the filly division with Rondeau in what would prove to be the final running of the National Stallion races.

== Racing shutdown ==
The 1908 passage of the Hart–Agnew anti-betting legislation by the New York Legislature under Republican Governor Charles Evans Hughes threatened the survival of horse racing in the state. In spite of strong opposition by prominent owners such as August Belmont Jr. and Harry Payne Whitney, reform legislators were not happy when they learned that betting was still going on at racetracks between individuals and they had further restrictive legislation passed by the New York Legislature in 1910. The Agnew–Perkins Law, a series of four bills and recorded as the Executive Liability Act, made it possible for racetrack owners and members of its board of directors to be fined and imprisoned if anyone was found betting, even privately, anywhere on their premises. After a 1911 amendment to the law that would limit the liability of owners and directors was defeated in the Legislature, every racetrack in New York State shut down Owners, whose horses of racing age had nowhere to go, began sending them, their trainers and their jockeys to race in England, France and other countries in Europe. Many horses ended their racing careers there and a number remained to become an important part of the European horse breeding industry. Thoroughbred Times reported that more than 1,500 American horses were sent overseas between 1908 and 1913 and of them at least 24 were either past, present, or future Champions. A February 21, 1913 ruling by the New York Supreme Court, Appellate Division saw horse racing return in 1913. However, the number of quality stallions in the United States had diminished to such an extent that it would take several years to get back to normal. The National Stallion Stakes would not be run again until 1926.

== Records ==
Speed record:

- 0:57.40 @ 5 furlongs: Skin Deep (1939)
- 1:04.00 @ 5.5 furlongs: Timbeau (1963)

Most wins by a jockey:

- 7 – Eddie Arcaro (1941, 1950, 1951, 1952, 1955, 1957, 1958)

Most wins by a trainer:

- 3 – James G. Rowe Sr. (1907, 1909, 1927)

Most wins by an owner:

- 4 – Cornelius Vanderbilt Whitney (1930, 1932, 1937, 1945)

== Winners ==
Year	Winner	Age	Jockey	Trainer	Owner	Dist. (Furlongs)	Time	Win$
1971	Plum Bold	2	Eddie Maple	Reggie Cornell	Calumet Farm	5 F	1:01.80	$19,417
1970	Proudest Roman	2	Pete Anderson	Woody Stephens	Mrs. John A. Morris	5.5 F	1:05.20	$20,458
1969	Jackal	2	Eddie Belmonte	Lucien Laurin	Claiborne Farm	5.5 F	1:05.20	$19,607
1968	Maison de Ville	2	Ron Turcotte	Edward L. Holton	Pin Oak Stable	5.5 F	1:05.20	$19,318
1967	What A Pleasure	2	Eddie Belmonte	Edward A. Neloy	Wheatley Stable	5.5 F	1:04.80	$18,933
1966	Great Power	2	Braulio Baeza	Edward A. Neloy	Wheatley Stable	5.5 F	1:04.60	$20,328
1965	Buckpasser (DH)	2	Braulio Baeza	William C. Winfrey	Ogden Phipps	5.5 F	1:04.60	$13,842
1965	Hospitality (DH)	2	Bobby Ussery	Hirsch Jacobs	Ethel D. Jacobs	5.5 F	1:04.60	$13,842
1964	Bold Lad	2	Braulio Baeza	William C. Winfrey	Wheatley Stable	5.5 F	1:04.00	$18,362
1963	Timbeau	2	John L. Rotz	William O. Hicks	Cambridge Stable (Perry Pease/Francis Kiernan)	5.5 F	1:04.00	$19,942
1962	O'Calaway	2	John L. Rotz	Burley E. Parke	Harbor View Farm	5.5 F	1:05.00	$21,086
1961	Sir Gaylord	2	Ismael Valenzuela	Casey Hayes	Meadow Stable	5.5 F	1:04.80	$21,697
1960	Errard King Jr.	2	Sam Boulmetis	Walter U. Ridenour	Joe Gavegnano	5.5 F	1:05.80	$19,857
1959	Ouija Board	2	David Erb	Larry H. Thompson	Modie J. Spiegel	5 F	0:58.00	$19,746
1958	Restless Wind	2	Eddie Arcaro	Horatio Luro	Llangolen Farm	5 F	0:58.80	$20,513
1957	Jester	2	Eddie Arcaro	Winbert F. Mulholland	George D. Widener Jr.	5 F	0:56.40	$20,825
1956	Bureaucracy	2	Sidney Cole	James E. Fitzsimmons	Ogden Phipps	5 F	0:57.20	$25,685
1955	Polly's Jet	2	Eddie Arcaro	Russell M. Downes	Barclay Stable	5 F	0:56.20	$14,725
1954	Islander	2	Hedley Woodhouse	Winbert F. Mulholland	George D. Widener Jr.	5 F	0:58.60	$20,940
1953	Porterhouse	2	Bill Boland	Charles E. Whittingham	Llangollen Farm	5 F	0:57.80	$20,120
1952	Tahitian King	2	Eddie Arcaro	James P. Conway	Ben F. Whitaker	5 F	0:56.00	$17,940
1951	Jet Master	2	Eddie Arcaro	George M. Odom	Marlboro Stud Farm (Joseph Eitinger)	5 F	0:55.80	$16,040
1950	Volt	2	Eddie Arcaro	Frank S. Barnett	Hal Price Headley	5 F	0:59.60	$17,030
1949	The Diver	2	Ovie Scurlock	Sherrill W. Ward	Russell A. Firestone	5 F	0:57.60	$15,080
1948	Mr. Busher	2	Ferrill Zufelt	James W. Smith	Maine Chance Farm	5 F	0:57.40	$18,550
1947	My Request	2	Ronnie Nash	James P. Conway	Ben F. Whitaker	5 F	0:57.80	$15,700
1946	Jet Pilot	2	Eric Guerin	Jimmy Smith	Maine Chance Farm	5 F	0:56.60	$15,690
1945	Enfilade	2	Arnold Kirkland	Lydell T. Ruff	Cornelius Vanderbilt Whitney	5 F	0:58.60	$12,845
1944	Flood Town	2	Warren Mehrtens	Max Hirsch	Edward Lasker	5 F	0:57.40	$12,230
1943	Mrs. Ames	2	Ted Atkinson	Preston M. Burch	Longchamps Farms (Henry Lustig)	5 F	0:58.80	$12,620
1942	Suncap	2	John Gilbert	Richard E. Handlen	Foxcatcher Farm	5 F	0:57.80	$13,410
1941	Some Chance	2	Eddie Arcaro	Ben A. Jones	Calumet Farm	5 F	0:59.00	$12,140
1940	Attention	2	Leon Haas	Max Hirsch	Anna C. Corning	5 F	0:58.40	$15,590
1939	Skin Deep	2	Raymond Workman	Joseph H. Stotler	Alfred Gwynne Vanderbilt Jr.	5 F	0:57.40	$10,380
1938	Donita M	2	Johnny Longden	Phil Reuter	Longchamps Farms (Henry Lustig)	5 F	0:58.20	$11,330
1937	The Chief	2	Raymond Workman	Thomas J. Healey	Cornelius Vanderbilt Whitney	5 F	0:58.00	$12,630
1936	Pompoon	2	Maurice Peters	Cyrus Field Clarke	Jerome H. Louchheim	5 F	0:59.00	$13,850
1935	Delphinium	2	John Gilbert	Robert Augustus Smith	Brookmeade Stable	5 F	0:58.40	$11,720
1934	Plat Eye	2	Silvio Coucci	William Brennan	Greentree Stable	5 F	0:58.40	$14,170
1933	Black Buddy	2	Silvio Coucci	William Brennan	Greentree Stable	5 F	0:58.40	$16,550
1932	Caterwaul	2	Raymond Workman	Thomas J. Healey	Cornelius Vanderbilt Whitney	5 F	0:58.20	$27,405
1931	Osculator	2	Earl Steffen	Bennett W. Creech	William R. Coe	5 F	0:59.60	$25,820
1930	Equipoise	2	Raymond Workman	Fred Hopkins	Cornelius Vanderbilt Whitney	5 F	0:59.60	$25,400
1929	Crazy Coot	2	Alfred Robertson	James G. Rowe Jr.	Harry Payne Whitney	5 F	1:00.20	$25,740
1928	Blue Larkspur	2	Anthony Pascuma	Herbert J. Thompson	Edward R. Bradley	5 F	0:59.00	$25,470
1927	Groucher	2	Earl Sande	James G. Rowe Sr.	Harry Payne Whitney	5 F	0:59.80	$22,710
1926	Chance Shot	2	Earl Sande	Peter W. Coyne	Joseph E. Widener	5 F	0:58.60	$13,095
1913	– 1925	race not held						
1912	No races held due to the Hart–Agnew Law.							
1911	No races held due to the Hart–Agnew Law.							
1910	Semprolus	2	Fred Langan	Frank Ernest	Richard F. Carman Sr.	5 F	0:58.80	$4,925
1909	Sweep	2	Guy Burns	James G. Rowe Sr.	James R. Keene	5.5 F	1:08.20	$13,180
1908	Sir Martin	2	James Lee	John E. Madden	John E. Madden	5 F	0:00.00 †	$9,875
1907	Colin	2	Walter Miller	James G. Rowe Sr.	James R. Keene	5 F	0:58.00	$10,066
1906	Charles Edward	2	Walter Miller	A. Jack Joyner	Sydney Paget	5 F	0:59.40	$8,083
1905	First Water	2	Frank O'Neill	Fred Burlew	Newton Bennington	5 F	1:03.40	$9,879
1904	Tanya	2	Willie Shaw	John W. Rogers	Harry Payne Whitney	5 F	0:58.20	$10,975
1903	Magistrate	2	John Bullman	John J. Hyland	August Belmont Jr.	5 F	0:58.00	$12,483
1902	Mizzen	2	John Bullman	John J. Hyland	August Belmont Jr.	5 F	0:56.50	$10,837
1901	Cunard	2	Winfield O'Connor	Green B. Morris	Green B. Morris	5 F	1:01.00	$11,155
1900	Bonnibert	2	Nash Turner	Thomas Welsh	Charles Fleischman's Sons	5 F	1:00.75	$15,352
1899	Pupil	2	George M. Odom	Green B. Morris	Green B. Morris	5 F	0:58.75	$14,527
1898	Jean Bereaud	2	Tod Sloan	Sam Hildreth	John Daly	5 F	0:59.00	$15,502

- † Due to a "blinding rainstorm", in 1908 there was no time taken.
