= Ort Wells =

American-bred Thoroughbred racehorse

Ort wells
- Sire: King Eric
- Grandsire: King Ernest
- Dam: Tea's Over
- Damsire: Hanover
- Sex: Stallion
- Foaled: 1901
- Country: United States
- Colour: Chestnut
- Breeder: Kinzea Stone
- Owner: John A. Drake
- Trainer: Enoch Wishard
- Record: 26: 13-3-1
- Earnings: US$75,450

Major wins
- Brighton Derby (1904); Lawrence Realization Stakes (1904); Commonwealth Handicap (1904); Tidal Stakes (1904); Brighton Mile (1905)

Awards
- American Champion 3-Year-Old Male Horse (1904); American Champion Older Male Horse (1905)
- Last updated on June 5, 2010

Ort Wells (foaled 1901) was an American Thoroughbred two-time Champion racehorse.

== Background ==
Ort Wells was bred by Col. Kinzea Stone of Scott County, Kentucky. He was sired by Withers Stakes winner King Eric and out of the mare Tea's Over, a daughter of U.S. Racing Hall of Fame inductee, Hanover.

== Racing career ==
Trained by Enoch Wishard for owner John Drake, Ort Wells was selected the retrospective American Champion Three-Year-Old Male Horse of 1904 when his wins included the Brighton Derby. He followed up the next year with performances that saw him named American Champion Older Male Horse of 1905.

== Stud record ==
At stud, Ort Wells met with modest success due in part to the upheaval in the American racing/breeding industry caused by the New York State Legislature's passage of the Hart–Agnew anti-betting laws that resulted in the closure of horse racing tracks in the state. American Thoroughbred owners soon began racing in Europe and then sending and/or selling their horses to European breeding farms. After standing in Kentucky, in December 1912 Ort wells was one of a large number of horses sent overseas where he stood at stud in Germany.
