= Brighton Derby =

- Class: Discontinued horse
- Location: Brighton Beach Race Course; Coney Island, New York, United States
- Inaugurated: 1901
- Race type: Thoroughbred – Flat racing

Race information
- Distance: 1½ miles (12 furlongs)
- Surface: Dirt
- Track: left-handed
- Qualification: Three-year-olds
- Weight: Assigned
- Purse: US$15,000

The Brighton Derby was an American Thoroughbred horse race run annually by the Brighton Beach Racing Association at its Brighton Beach Race Course at Brighton Beach on Coney Island, New York. Open to three-year-olds, it was contested at a distance of one and one half miles (12 furlongs) on dirt. Run during the mid to latter part of July, it was the last of the racing season's thirteen Derby races.

The Brighton Derby was first run at 1½ miles in 1901, then at 1¼ miles in 1902 and 1903 before reverting to the original distance.

During its seven years of existence, Brighton Derby winners Ort Wells, Sysonby and Accountant went on to earn American Champion Three-Year-Old Male Horse honors. Sysonby would also earn the American Horse of the Year title.

== The end of a race and of a racetrack ==
The 1908 Brighton Derby was never run and as such the August 3, 1907 edition was its last. The race's demise was a result of the 1908 passage of the Hart–Agnew anti-betting legislation by the New York Legislature under Republican Governor Charles Evans Hughes that led to a state-wide shutdown of racing in 1911 and 1912. Although a February 21, 1913 ruling by the New York Supreme Court, Appellate Division saw horse racing return in 1913, it was too late for the Brighton Beach horse racing facility and it never reopened.

== Records ==
Speed record: (at 1½ miles) : 2:30 4/5 – Charles Edward (1907) (new race and track record)

Most wins by a jockey:

- 2 – Frank O'Neill (1903, 1904)

Most wins by a trainer:

- No trainer won this race more than once.

Most wins by an owner:

- 2 – James B. A. Haggin (1901, 1903)

== Winners ==
Year	Winner	Age	Jockey	Trainer	Owner	Dist. (Miles)	Time	Win$
1907	Charles Edward	3	Willie Knapp	Frank M. Taylor	Patchogue Stable (William H. DuBois)	11/2 m	2:30.80	$11,750
1906	Accountant	3	Skeets Martin	Matthew M. Allen	James B. Brady	11/2 m	2:37.20	$11,750
1905	Sysonby	3	Dave Nicol	James G. Rowe Sr.	James R. Keene	11/2 m	2:33.20	$11,750
1904	Ort Wells	3	Frank O'Neill	Enoch Wishard	John A. Drake	11/2 m	2:32.60	$9,725
1903	Charles Elwood	3	Frank O'Neill	A. Jack Joyner	James B. A. Haggin	11/4 m	2:05.00	$7,550
1902	Hyphen	3	George Odom	Peter Wimmer	Samuel S. Brown	11/4 m	2:04.20	$7,550
1901	Watercolor	3	Henry Spencer	Charles Littlefield Jr.	James B. A. Haggin	11/2 m	2:34.20	$8,300
