= Frank M. Taylor =

American horse trainer (1869–1941)

Personal information
- Born: May 9, 1869 Missouri
- Died: May 22, 1941 (aged 72) Chicago, Illinois
- Resting place: Saint Joseph Cemetery, River Grove, Illinois
- Occupation: Racehorse trainer / Owner

Horse racing career
- Sport: Horse racing

Major racing wins
- Nursery Handicap (1896); Fall Handicap (1900); Second Special Stakes (1903); Twin City Handicap (1903, 1907); Brighton Derby (1907); Brighton Mile (1907); Municipal Handicap (1907); Suburban Handicap (1907, 1931); Seagate Stakes (1907); Patchogue Stakes (1908); Bashford Manor Stakes (1911); Raceland Stakes (1911); Chesapeake Stakes (1912); Clark Handicap (1912); Havre de Grace Handicap (1912); Juvenile Stakes (1922); Whirl Stakes (1922); Youthful Stakes (1922); Adirondack Stakes (1930); Clover Stakes (1930); Excelsior Stakes (1931); American Classic Race wins: Kentucky Derby (1912)

Significant horses
- Charles Edward, McChesney, Nealon, Worth

Francis Marion Taylor (May 9, 1869 - May 22, 1941) was an American Thoroughbred horse racing trainer who trained Nealon and Worth to National Championship honors, the latter winning the 1912 Kentucky Derby. He also trained Charles Edward, a colt that in 1907 set three track records on dirt including a World record.

Among Taylor's wins were two editions of the Suburban Handicap which at the time was the richest and most important race in the United States open to older horses.

Frank Taylor retired from racing in 1934 after suffering a stroke. He died on May 22, 1941, at his residence in Chicago.

== Champions ==
- American Champion Older Dirt Male Horse (1907) : Nealon
- American Champion Two-Year-Old Male Horse (1911) : Worth
