= Willie Knapp =

American jockey

Personal information
- Born: August 21, 1888 Chicago, Illinois, United States
- Died: October 26, 1972 (aged 84) New Hyde Park, New York, United States
- Occupation: Jockey/Trainer

Horse racing career
- Sport: Horse racing
- Career wins: 649

Major racing wins
- Jockey wins:Municipal Handicap (1905, 1906, 1907); Ocean Handicap (1905); Reapers Stakes (1905); Delaware Handicap (1905, 1918); Advance Stakes (1906); Astoria Stakes (1906, 1919); Brighton Derby (1907); Brighton Mile (1907); Flight Stakes (1907); Matron Stakes (1907); Santa Anita Handicap (Ascot Park) (1907); Seagate Stakes (1907); Spinaway Stakes (1907); Twin City Handicap (1907; Connaught Cup Stakes (1913); Brooklyn Handicap (1917); Empire City Handicap (1917); Great American Stakes (1917, 1919); Saratoga Special Stakes (1917); Keene Memorial Stakes (1918); Manhattan Handicap (1918); Travers Stakes (1918); Champlain Handicap (1919); Demoiselle Stakes (1919); Dwyer Stakes (1919); Empire City Derby (1919); Huron Handicap (1919); Lawrence Realization Stakes (1919); Sanford Memorial Stakes (1919); Saratoga Special Stakes (1919) American Classic Race wins: Kentucky Derby (1918) Trainer wins: Merchants and Citizens Handicap (1921, 1926); Saratoga Cup (1921); Florida Derby (1929); Arlington Lassie Stakes (1930); Havre de Grace Cup Handicap (1931); Queens County Handicap (1949, 1950); Monmouth Handicap (1949); Royal Palm Handicap (1949, 1950, 1951); Westchester Handicap (1949); All American Handicap (1950); Edgemere Handicap (1950); McLennan Handicap (1950)

Honors
- United States' Racing Hall of Fame (1969)

Significant horses
- Charles Edward, Exterminator, Purchase, Sun Briar, Three Rings, Upset
- Updated on May 11, 2011

William J. Knapp (August 21, 1888 – October 26, 1972) was an American thoroughbred horse racing Hall of Fame jockey. He was known for racing horses such as Exterminator and Sun Briar. He became the jockey for Exterminator in the 1918 Kentucky Derby. He was expecting to race Sun Briar, an extremely fast colt, but Sun Briar became ill and he had no choice but to race Exterminator, Sun Briar's training horse. However, Exterminator won the Derby and Knapp became his lifelong jockey.

Knapp is also well remembered as the jockey aboard the aptly named Upset on August 13, 1919, when he handed the legendary Man o' War his only defeat in the Sanford Memorial Stakes.

Among his many success as a jockey, during a period of less than a month in 1907 Knapp guided Charles Edward to three track records including a World record. In a 1910 history of the feat, the Daily Racing Form wrote that Charles Edward "gave in the Seagate one of the most amazing displays of high-class speed ever witnessed."

On September 27, 1914, Knapp married Elizabeth Blute, the daughter of trainer James Blute who was the 1907 United States Co-Champion Thoroughbred Trainer by wins tying with James G. Rowe Sr. and Frank Hanlon.

Willie Knapp died at age 84 on October 26, 1972, at the Long Island Jewish Hospital in New Hyde Park, New York.
