= Seagate Stakes =

American Thoroughbred horse race

- Class: Discontinued stakes
- Location: Brighton Beach Race Course, Brighton Beach, New York (1899-1909); Empire City Race Track, Yonkers, New York (1910)
- Inaugurated: 1899
- Race type: Thoroughbred - Flat racing
- Website: www.pegasusworldcup.com

Race information
- Distance: 1 1/8 miles (9 furlongs)
- Surface: Dirt
- Track: left-handed
- Qualification: Three-year-olds

The Seagate Stakes was an American Thoroughbred horse race held annually from 1899 through 1907 at New York's Brighton Beach Race Course then for a final time in 1910 with a drastically reduced purse at Empire City Race Track in Yonkers, New York. A race for three-year-old horses of either sex, it was run on dirt over a distance of a mile and one-quarter for the first two runnings then at a mile and one-eighth for the remainder.

== Historical notes ==
The Seagate was a popular race won by quality horses of the era. Among the winners, Charles Edward won the 1907 edition in track record time which also set a new American record. The Seagate was one of three track records Charles Edward would set that year. In a 1910 history of the race, the Daily Racing Form wrote that Charles Edward "gave in the Seagate one of the most amazing displays of high-class speed ever witnessed."

For the colt Old England, winning the 1902 Seagate was one of several stakes wins that year which included the Preakness Stakes, one of the American Classics that would become part of the U.S. Triple Crown series.

Sir Huon came into the Seagate Stakes having already won that year's 1906 Kentucky Derby, a race which would also become part of the U.S. Triple Crown series.

== End of a Race and of a Racetrack ==
The Brighton Beach Race Course prospered until 1908 when the New York Legislature passed the Hart–Agnew Law banning gambling in New York State. Motor racing events were held at the facility in an attempt to keep the track from closing permanently but even after horse racing returned to New York it was too late to save the business.

At the time it ceased horse racing operations, the Brighton Beach Race Course was the oldest horse track in steady use in the New York City area.

== Records ==
Speed record:

- 1:50.60 @ 1 1-8 miles: Charles Edward (1907)

Most wins by a jockey:

- No jockey won this race more than once

Most wins by a trainer:

- 2 - Thomas Welsh (1904, 1905)

Most wins by an owner:

- No owner won this race more than once

== Winners ==
Year	Winner	Age	Jockey	Trainer	Owner	Dist. (Miles)	Time	Win $
1910	Dalmatian	3	Carroll Shilling	Sam Hildreth	Sam Hildreth	1 1-8 m	1:53.00	$925
1909	Race not held							
1908	Race not held							
1907	Charles Edward	3	Willie Knapp	Frank M. Taylor	Patchogue Stable (William H. DuBois)	1 1-8 m	1:50.60	$3,315
1906	Sir Huon	3	Roscoe Troxler	Peter W. Coyne	Bashford Manor Stable	1 1-8 m	1:54.00	$3,455
1905	Merry Lark	3	Gene Hildebrand	Thomas Welsh	Andrew Miller	1 1-8 m	1:52.40	$2,860
1904	Knight Errant	3	Jack Martin	Thomas Welsh	Philip J. Dwyer	1 1-8 m	1:52.60	$3,035
1903	Rigodon	3	Willie Gannon	James G. Rowe Sr.	James R. Keene	1 1-8 m	1:53.20	$3,015
1902	Old England	3	Lee Jackson	Green B. Morris	Green B. Morris	1 1-8 m	1:54.20	$2,650
1901	Gold Heels	3	Tommy Burns	Matthew M. Allen	Fred C. McLewee & Diamond Jim Brady	1 1-8 m	1:52.60	$2,675
1900	Prince of Melbourne	3	Henry Spencer	John A. Kyle	Frank D. Beard	1 1-4 m	2:05.20	$2,450
1899	Ethelbert	3	Danny Maher	A. Jack Joyner	Perry Belmont	1 1-4 m	2:09.40	$2,450
