= Worth (horse) =

American-bred Thoroughbred racehorse

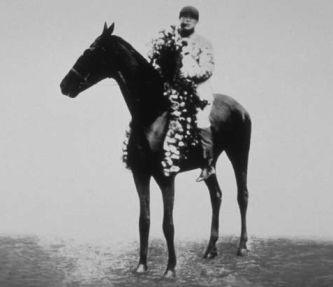
- Jockey Cal Shilling & Worth, 1912 Kentucky Derby
- Sire: Knight of the Thistle
- Grandsire: Rosebery
- Dam: Miss Hanover
- Damsire: Hanover
- Sex: Stallion
- Foaled: 1909
- Country: United States
- Color: Bay
- Breeder: R. H. McCarter Porter
- Owner: 1) C. T. Worthington; 2) Harry C. Hallenbeck
- Trainer: Frank M. Taylor
- Record: 31: 15-7-3
- Earnings: $25,590

Major wins
- Raceland Stakes (1911); Bashford Manor Stakes (1911); Chesapeake Stakes (1912); Latonia Handicap (1912); American Classic Race wins: Kentucky Derby (1912)

Honors
- American Champion Two-Year-Old Colt (1911)
- Last updated on November 4, 2011

Worth (1909–1912) was an American Thoroughbred race horse. He was the winner of the 1912 Kentucky Derby, an achievement he is best known for.

== Background and family ==
Worth was bred in Kentucky by R.H. McCarter Porter.He was sired by Knight of the Thistle, a stakes-winning stallion who was imported to the United States (New Jersey) in 1899. During his racing career, Knight of the Thistle won the inaugural 1843 Royal Hunt Cup, Great Jubilee Handicap, and Limekiln Stakes. Through his grandson King Plaudit (sired by Kentucky Derby winner Plaudit), Knight of the Thistle is an ancestor to American Quarter Horse Hall of Famer Maddon's Bright Eyes.

Worth's dam, Miss Hanover (by Hanover), won her first start at Pimlico in 1899, defeating Pink Domino, the dam of Belmont Stakes winner and prominent sire Sweep and Curiosity, the dam of American Champion Juvenile Novelty. Miss Hanover was also the dam of 1916 Alabama Stakes winner Malachite and multiple stakes winner Hanovia.

Worth's full sister, Fair Atlanta, is the dam of Dangerous, winner of the 1925 Travers Stakes and Belmont Stakes runner-up. Dangerous was trained by Carroll Shilling, the jockey that rode Worth in his Kentucky Derby. Fair Atlanta is also the dam of multiple stakes winners Bondage, Georgie, and Thessaly.

== Racing career ==
Trained by Frank M. Taylor, Worth won the 1912 Bashford Manor Stakes and Raceland Stakes as a juvenile. He was the top racehorse, based on earnings, in 1911 and would earn American Champion Two-Year-Old Colt honors in 1911.

Worth's biggest career win came in 1912 as a three-year-old when he took the 1912 Kentucky Derby. Ridden by jockey C. H. Shilling, the favored frontrunner Worth held off longshot Duval to win by a neck margin. His final time of 2:09.40 is among the slowest in the Derby's history.

His other wins included the 1912 Chesapeake Stakes and 1912 Latonia Handicap.

== Death ==
On November 6, 1912, Worth was severely injured during a race run at the Pimlico Race Course in Baltimore, Maryland. Worth's jockey, McTaggart, rode too closely to another horse, causing a three-horse collision that severely injured two other jockeys and severed two tendons in Worth's leg. Worth was euthanized shortly after this incident due to blood poisoning from his extensive injuries.

== Pedigree ==
Pedigree of Worth
Sire Knight of the Thistle 1893	Rosebery 1872	Speculum	Vedette
Sire Knight of the Thistle 1893	Rosebery 1872	Speculum	Doralice
Sire Knight of the Thistle 1893	Rosebery 1872	Ladylike	Newminster
Sire Knight of the Thistle 1893	Rosebery 1872	Ladylike	Zuleika
Sire Knight of the Thistle 1893	The Empress Maud 1881	Beauclerc	Rosicrucian
Sire Knight of the Thistle 1893	The Empress Maud 1881	Beauclerc	Bonny Bell
Sire Knight of the Thistle 1893	The Empress Maud 1881	Stella	High Treason
Sire Knight of the Thistle 1893	The Empress Maud 1881	Stella	Giltnook
Dam Miss Hanover 1897	Hanover 1884	Hindoo	Virgil
Dam Miss Hanover 1897	Hanover 1884	Hindoo	Florence
Dam Miss Hanover 1897	Hanover 1884	Bourbon Belle	Bonnie Scotland
Dam Miss Hanover 1897	Hanover 1884	Bourbon Belle	Ella D
Dam Miss Hanover 1897	Miss Dawn 1888	Strathmore	Waverly
Dam Miss Hanover 1897	Miss Dawn 1888	Strathmore	Brenna
Dam Miss Hanover 1897	Miss Dawn 1888	Dawn of Day	Ozark
Dam Miss Hanover 1897	Miss Dawn 1888	Dawn of Day	Lottie Moon
