= 1906 Kentucky Derby =

Horse race

32nd Kentucky Derby
- Kentucky Derby
- Grade I stakes race
- Roscoe Troxler and Sir Huon at the 1906 Kentucky Derby
- Location: Churchill Downs
- Date: May 2, 1906
- Winning horse: Sir Huon
- Jockey: Roscoe Troxler
- Trainer: Peter Coyne
- Owner: Bashford Manor Stable
- Surface: Dirt

The 1906 Kentucky Derby was the 32nd running of the Kentucky Derby. The race took place on May 2, 1906. The field was reduced to six competitors when Creel was scratched.

It was the first Kentucky Derby timed to fifths of a second instead of fourths.

== Full results ==
Finished	Post	Horse	Jockey	Trainer	Owner	Time / behind
1st	4	Sir Huon	Roscoe Troxler	Peter Coyne	Bashford Manor Stable	2:08.80
2nd	3	Lady Navarre	Tommy Burns	George P. Brazier	Charles R. Ellison	2
3rd	5	James Reddick	Joseph Dominick	George P. Brazier	Charles R. Ellison	3
4th	2	Hyperion II	Dale Austin	Joseph S. Hawkins	J. S. Hawkins & Co.	5
5th	1	Debar	Dave Nicol	William T. Woodard	H. Shannon & Co.	10
6th	6	Velours	Edward Walsh	Frank Bruhns	H. Franklin	3

- Winning Breeder: George J. Long; (KY)

== Payout ==
- The winner received a purse of $4,850.
- Second place received $700.
- Third place received $300.
