= 1912 Kentucky Derby =

Horse race

38th Kentucky Derby
- Kentucky Derby
- Grade I stakes race
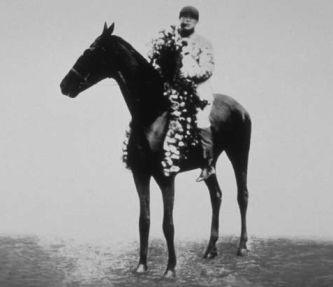
- Jockey Cal Shilling and Worth at the 1912 Kentucky Derby
- Location: Churchill Downs
- Date: May 11, 1912
- Winning horse: Worth
- Jockey: Carroll H. Shilling
- Trainer: Frank M. Taylor
- Owner: Harry C. Hallenbeck
- Surface: Dirt

The 1912 Kentucky Derby was the 38th running of the Kentucky Derby. The race took place on May 11, 1912.

== Full results ==
Finished	Post	Horse	Jockey	Trainer	Owner	Time / behind
1st	5	Worth	Carroll H. Shilling	Frank M. Taylor	Harry C. Hallenbeck	2:09.40
2nd	7	Duval	Oscar Fain	John C. Gallaher	Gallaher Bros.	Neck
3rd	1	Flamma	Johnny Loftus	John J. Duffy	E. F. Condran	5
4th	4	Free Lance	Charles Peak	Peter W. Coyne	George J. Long	4
5th	3	Guaranola	George Molesworth	S. Miller Henderson	Henderson & Hogan	1
6th	6	Sonada	Ted Koerner	John H. "Jack" McCormack	Catesby Woodford	6
7th	2	Wheelwright	George Byrne	J. Oliver Keene	Johnson N. Camden Jr.	20

- Winning Breeder: R. H. McCarter Potter; (KY)
- Horses The Manager and Patruche scratched before the race.

== Payout ==
Post	Horse	Win	Place	Show
5	Worth	$ 3.60	3.90	3.30
7	Duval		14.00	5.70
1	Flamma			4.50

- The winner received a purse of $4,850.
- Second place received $700.
- Third place received $300.
