= A. Jack Joyner =

American racehorse trainer (1861—1943)

Jack Joyner
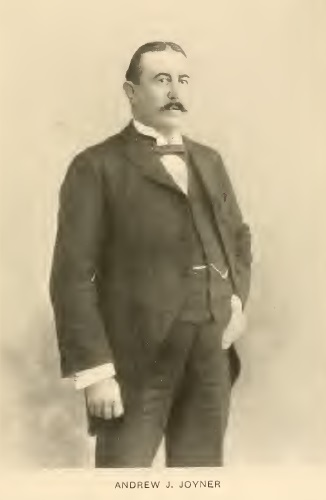

Personal information
- Born: August 4, 1861 Enfield, North Carolina, United States
- Died: September 1, 1943 (aged 82) Chestnut Hill, Pennsylvania, United States
- Resting place: Green-Wood Cemetery, Brooklyn, New York
- Occupation: Trainer / Owner

Horse racing career
- Sport: Horse racing
- Career wins: Not found

Major racing wins
- Belles Stakes (1892, 1904, 1908); Double Event Stakes (part 2) (1892, 1906); Flatbush Stakes (1892, 1898, 1904); Foam Stakes (1892, 1905); Great Eastern Handicap (1892, 1903, 1904); Autumn Maiden Stakes (1893, 1903, 1904); Fall Handicap (1894, 1904); Daisy Stakes (1895); Fashion Stakes (1895); Pansy Stakes (1895); Surf Stakes (1898); Lawrence Realization Stakes (1899, 1908); Seagate Stakes (1899); Spindrift Stakes (1899); Annual Champion Stakes (1900); Islip Handicap (1900); Metropolitan Handicap (1900, 1919, 1930); Municipal Handicap (1900, 1908); Reapers Stakes (1900); Twin City Handicap (1900); Dash Stakes (1902, 1905); Futurity Stakes (1903, 1923, 1930); Brighton Derby (1903); Brighton Handicap (1903); Century Stakes (1903); Neptune Stakes (1903, 1904, 1905); Occidental Handicap (1903); Rancho Del Paso Stakes (1903); Rosebuds Stakes (1903); Saratoga Handicap (1903, 1904); Travers Stakes (1903); Brighton Oaks (1904, 1905); Flight Stakes (1904, 1905, 1908); Vernal Stakes (1904); Winged Foot Handicap (1904); Bay Ridge Handicap (1905); Brighton Cup (1905); Carter Handicap (1905); Brooklyn Derby (1905); Gazelle Handicap (1905); Hudson Stakes (1905, 1930); Mermaid Stakes (1905, 1908); Sheepshead Bay Stakes (1905); Withers Stakes (1905, 1931); Brighton Mile (1906); Eclipse Stakes (1906); Great American Stakes (1906, 1909); National Stallion Stakes (1906); Tremont Stakes (1906, 1928); Manhattan Handicap (1907, 1908); First Special Stakes (1908); Sapphire Stakes (1908); Delaware Handicap (1909); Walden Stakes (1916, 1933); Oakdale Handicap (1917); Coaching Club American Oaks (1918); Empire City Handicap (1919); Excelsior Handicap (1922); Sanford Stakes (1923, 1929); Saratoga Special Stakes (1923, 1930); Paumonok Handicap (1924); Juvenile Stakes (1925); Hopeful Stakes (1928, 1929); Youthful Stakes (1928); Astoria Stakes (1930); Flash Stakes (1930); Grand Union Hotel Stakes (1930); United States Hotel Stakes (1930); Demoiselle Stakes (1931); Jamaica Handicap (1931); Chesapeake Stakes (1932) American Classic Race wins: Preakness Stakes (1905, 1907, 1908); In England: Ayr Gold Cup; Wokingham Handicap; Middle Park Plate (1910); Trial Stakes (1910); Windsor Castle Stakes (1910); Hopeful Stakes (1910); Newmarket Select Stakes (1910); Victoria Cup Handicap (1912); Challenge Stakes (1913)

Racing awards
- U.S. Champion Thoroughbred Trainer by wins (1908)

Honors
- National Museum of Racing and Hall of Fame (1955); A. J. Joyner Handicap at Keeneland

Significant horses
- Borrow, Cairngorm, Charles Edward, Ethelbert, Fair Play, Fitz Herbert, Hamburg Belle, Jamestown, Royal Tourist, St. James, Waterboy, Water Pearl, Whisk Broom II

Andrew Jackson "Jack" Joyner (August 4, 1861 – September 1, 1943) was an American Thoroughbred horse racing Hall of Fame trainer and owner.

Known as "Jack" and reported as "A.J." and "A. Jack", Joyner was born in Enfield, North Carolina, the son of Dr. and Mrs. Henry Joyner. A fan of horse racing, in 1879 the seventeen-year-old Joyner had hung a series of racing pictures on the wall in the small town post office where he was working when they were spotted by future U.S. Racing Hall of Fame trainer William Burch. Joyner's enthusiasm led to Burch offering him a job with his racing stable. From there, Jack Joyner went to work for a short time as a jockey before turning to the training horses. He saddled his first winner in 1884 in a career that would span fifty-nine years. From that, six years were spent in England following passage of State of New York Hart–Agnew anti-betting law in 1908, the year he won more races than any trainer in the United States.

Jack Joyner's abilities led to him training for major owners such as James B. A. Haggin, Sydney Paget, and for Harry Payne Whitney and August Belmont Jr. whose horses he raced in England including Whisk Broom II. In addition, Joyner owned and raced a number of horses for himself both in the United States and in England. Jack Joyner worked in England from the time the racing season opened on March 23, 1909 until November 1915 when he returned to the United States and began a twenty-five-year association as trainer for stable owner George D. Widener Jr.

During his career, Jack Joyner trained five Champions:

- Ethelbert, American Champion Three-Year-Old Male Horse (1899)
- Waterboy, American Champion Older Male Horse (1903)
- Hamburg Belle, American Champion Two-Year-Old Filly (1903)
- St. James, American Champion Two-Year-Old Colt (1923)
- Jamestown, American Champion Two-Year-Old Colt (1930)

Jack Joyner died on September 1, 1943, at age eighty-two at George Widener's Erdenheim Stud at Chestnut Hill, Pennsylvania. Following its creation, he was part of the inaugural class inducted in the National Museum of Racing and Hall of Fame in 1955.

For a time, Keeneland Race Course in Lexington, Kentucky, ran the A. J. Joyner Handicap, a six furlong event that notably was won by Whirlaway in 1941.
