= Carroll H. Shilling =

American jockey

Carroll Shilling
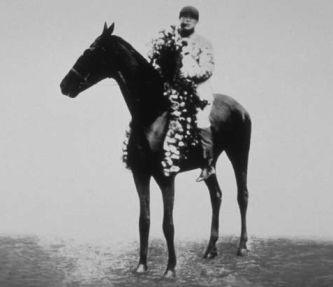
- Jockey Cal Shilling & Worth; 1912 Kentucky Derby

Personal information
- Born: 1885 Texas, United States
- Died: 1950 (aged 64–65)
- Occupation: Jockey

Horse racing career
- Sport: Horse racing
- Career wins: 969

Major racing wins
- Aqueduct Handicap (1904, 1909); Grand Union Hotel Stakes (1907); Louisiana Derby (1907); Alabama Stakes (1908, 1910); Annual Champion Stakes (1908); Autumn Maiden Stakes (1908); Champlain Handicap (1908); Coronation Futurity Stakes (1908); Dash Stakes (1908); Flatbush Stakes (1908); Metropolitan Handicap (1908); Remsen Stakes (1908); Bowie Handicap (1909, 1911); Saratoga Special Stakes (1908, 1910); September Stakes (1908); Brighton Mile (1910); Bay Ridge Handicap (1910); Dwyer Stakes (1910); Gazelle Handicap (1910); Islip Handicap (1910); Paumonok Handicap (1910); Seagate Stakes (1910); Travers Stakes (1910); Van Cortlandt Handicap (1910); Belmont Futurity Stakes (1910); Walden Stakes (1910); Spinaway Stakes (1910); Havre de Grace Cup Handicap (1912) American Classic Race wins: Kentucky Derby (1912) Canada: Breeders' Stakes (1908); Coronation Futurity Stakes (1908); King Edward Gold Cup (1908, 1911); Toronto Cup Handicap (1910); Windsor Hotel Cup Handicap (1911); Woodstock Stakes (1911)

Racing awards
- United States Champion Jockey by earnings (1910)

Honours
- United States' Racing Hall of Fame (1970)

Significant horses
- Colin, King James, Fitz Herbert; Worth, Inferno

Carroll Hugh "Cal" Shilling (1885–1950) was an American Thoroughbred horse racing Hall of Fame jockey. In his 1926 autobiography, The Spell of the Turf, Hall of Fame trainer Sam Hildreth wrote that Shilling was the greatest rider he ever saw.

A native of Texas, Carroll Shilling was frequently referred to as "Cal". He began riding at an early age on bush tracks in the Southwestern United States and embarked on a professional riding career in 1904. The following year he moved to compete at racetracks in the New York and New Jersey areas. In 1910, he was the United States Champion Jockey by earnings. Shilling also would ride in Canada for the prominent stable owned by liquor magnate Joseph E. Seagram, winning a number of important races including what became one of the Canadian Classic Races, the Breeders' Stakes.

== Kentucky Derby ==
During his career, Shilling had two mounts in the Kentucky Derby. He finished second aboard Miami in the 1909 running, then in 1912 he rode Worth to victory in what the National Museum of Racing and Hall of Fame describes as probably his most dramatic win.

== Personal problems and ban from racing ==
On November 19, 1909, The New York Times reported that Shilling severely stabbed stable owner R. L. Thomas after the two got into an argument at Sheepshead Bay Race Track. In the spring of 1910, The Jockey Club (the New York-based association of racehorse owners) set aside Shilling's application for a jockey license.

The Hart–Agnew Law, legislation outlawing parimutuel betting, was passed by the New York Legislature which resulted in the closure of all New York racetracks between 1911 and 1912. On November 2, 1911, The New York Times reported that Carroll Shilling and trainer Sam Hildreth had sailed to England aboard the RMS Mauretania with the intent of riding there for the stable of American owner Charles Kohler. On January 9, 1912, The New York Times reported that Kohler was sailing to England and would apply for a license for Shilling to ride there. However, that did not work out and the Times then reported on March 10 that Shilling would ride for Kohler's American stable under trainer David J. Leary.

In an era when jockeys commonly used dirty tactics, Shilling was notorious for his actions. In 1912, while riding at Havre de Grace Racetrack in Maryland, he was banned from racing for striking another jockey with his whip during a race. The action resulted in his riding career ending after just six full years plus two partial years when the New York racing shutdown meant there was fierce competition for jockeys at tracks outside New York state.

Following his ban from riding, Shilling remained in racing as a stableman and in 1915 his application for a jockey's license was again denied. He eventually went to work for J. K. L. Ross, a major stable owner from Canada with racing and breeding operations there and in the United States. As an assistant to trainer H. Guy Bedwell, Shilling helped condition Sir Barton for his 1919 Triple Crown championship and tutored a young jockey named Earl Sande, who would go on to a Hall of Fame career of his own. However, Shilling's suspension from riding remained an issue for many years. On November 11, 1920, The New York Times reported that Ross had successfully petitioned the Maryland State Racing Commission to lift the ban on Shilling and grant him a temporary jockey's license. The Maryland Jockey Club revolted against the decision and the matter became a major public embarrassment for racing when a mob at Pimlico Race Course, who wanted Shilling to race, attacked and beat up Maryland racing commissioner Joseph P. Kennedy. The issue soon involved The Jockey Club (of New York), whose powerful president August Belmont, Jr. lined up against the attempt by Ross to have Shilling reinstated. Bedwell, the Ross stable trainer, had testified before the Maryland State Racing Commission in support of Shilling and he too would become a central figure in the controversy. The April 21, 1921 issue of The New York Times quoted from a letter by Belmont to Ross saying "the entries of your stable will not be acceptable to this association if ex-Jockey Carroll Shilling or H. G. Bedwell is in any way connected, directly or indirectly, with the same."

The issue threatened the closure of Pimlico, the only one of the four Maryland racetracks that sided with the New York authorities. Maryland's governor, Albert Ritchie, got involved as did state senator William I. Norris, who acted as legal counsel for trainer Bedwell. Pimlico president Charles E. McLane then supported Bedwell and the Maryland State Racing Commission threatened to ban members of The Jockey Club from competing in Maryland. The Commission stood its ground and on June 30, 1921, amended their temporary order to grant Shilling a permanent jockey's license. However, the Commission gave in to the unrelenting political pressure to end the inter-state dispute and on July 9, 1921, it passed a resolution that The New York Times said had the effect of making any license issued by the Commission of doubtful value because the resolution declared its licenses not to be a mandate to any of Maryland's racetracks. The effect of the resolution was that Carroll Shilling never rode again and his ordeal led to a severe drinking problem. In their May 17, 1948, edition, Time magazine reported that in recent years he had been in and out of sanitariums. Two years later, Shilling was found dead under a horse van at Belmont Park.

In a short career, Carroll Shilling won 969 races and in his final three seasons, had a remarkable thirty-four percent winning percentage. In 1970, the National Museum of Racing at Saratoga Springs, New York, recognized Schilling's talent and inducted him into their Hall of Fame.
