= Walter Miller (jockey) =

American jockey

Personal information
- Born: 1890 Brooklyn, New York, United States
- Died: 1959 (aged 68–69)
- Occupation: Jockey

Horse racing career
- Sport: Horse racing
- Career wins: 1,094

Major racing wins
- United States: Excelsior Handicap (1905, 1906); Santa Anita Handicap (Ascot Park) (1905, 1906); Sheepshead Bay Handicap (1905, 1906, 1908); Alabama Stakes (1906); Brighton Mile (1906); Brighton Junior Stakes (1906, 1907); Broadway Stakes (1906); Champagne Stakes (1906, 1907); Daisy Stakes (1906); Edgemere Handicap (1906); Foam Stakes (1906); Flying Handicap (1906); Great Trial Stakes (1906, 1907); Huron Handicap (1906, 1907); Junior Champion Stakes (1906, 1907); Matron Stakes (1906, 1907); National Stallion Stakes (1906, 1907); Pansy Stakes (1906); Russet Stakes (1906); Second Special Stakes (1906); Southampton Handicap (1906); Toboggan Handicap (1906); Travers Stakes (1906); Vernal Stakes (1906, 1907); Zephyr Stakes (1906); Belles Stakes (1907); Belmont Futurity Stakes (1907); Brooklyn Handicap (1907); Dwyer Stakes (1907); Flatbush Stakes (1907); Laureate Stakes (1907); Oakdale Handicap (1907); Pierrepont Handicap (1907); Rancho Del Paso Stakes (1907); Saratoga Cup (1907); Saratoga Handicap (1907); Saratoga Special Stakes (1907); Double Event Stakes (part 1) (1908); Spindrift Stakes (1908); Tidal Stakes (1908); Juvenile Stakes (1909) Europe: Preis des Winterfavoriten (1909) American Classic race wins: Preakness Stakes (1906)

Racing awards
- United States Champion Jockey by wins (1906, 1907)

Honors
- U.S. Racing Hall of Fame (1955); International Jewish Sports Hall of Fame (1983)

Significant horses
- Ballot, Charles Edward, Colin, Peter Pan, Running Water, Whimsical

Walter Miller (1890–1959) was an American jockey. In 1906, he won 388 races, becoming the first jockey to win more than 300 races in a single year, a record not broken until 1952. He was inducted for his achievements into the U.S. Racing Racing Hall of Fame, the Jockey Hall of Fame, and the International Jewish Sports Hall of Fame.

== Early life ==
Miller was born in Brooklyn, New York. He was an Orthodox Jew.

== Racing career ==
He rode in his first race at age 14.

At the age of 16, in 1906, he won 388 races, and became the first jockey to win more than 300 races in a single year (the following year he won 334 races). It was a record not broken until Willie Shoemaker exceeded it in 1952. He led the U.S. in victories in both 1906 and 1907, winning the United States National Riding Championship both years. Between 1905 and 1908, Miller won 1,094 races from 4,336 mounts which is an extraordinary 25.2 winning percentage.

In his career, more than half the time his horse finished "in the money". On July 29, 1906, Walter Miller rode five winners on a single racecard at Brighton Beach Race Course. He set a record by riding eight consecutive winners, over a two-day period at Benning Race Track.

In 1906, he won the Preakness on Whimsical. He also won the Travers Stakes, Alabama Stakes, Champagne Stakes, Saratoga Special Stakes, and Brooklyn Handicap.

Writer Sam Elias described Miller as “a better rider than Tod Sloan.” He rode at times for James R. Keene’s stable, Newcastle Stables. Most of his career, he was managed by "Sunny Jim" Fitzimmons.

His career ended in the United States after he gained weight as a late teenager. He grew to 5’ 8.5” and 160 pounds. In 1909 and 1910, he rode primarily in Australia and Europe where weight restrictions were less stringent.

== Honors ==
Miller was inducted into the U.S. Racing Racing Hall of Fame in 1955, into the Jockey Hall of Fame in 1957, and into the International Jewish Sports Hall of Fame in 1983.
