= Roscoe Troxler =

American jockey (1883–1976)

- Roscoe Troxler on Sir Huon, 1906 Kentucky Derby

Personal information
- Born: June 15, 1883 Nashville, Tennessee
- Died: July 7, 1976 (aged 83)
- Occupation: Jockey/Trainer

Horse racing career
- Sport: Horse racing
- Career wins: not found

Major racing wins
- As a jockey: Gentilly Handicap (1899); Arkansas Derby (1904); Autumn Stakes (1906); Islip Handicap (1906); Seagate Stakes (1906); American Turf Association Handicap (1907); Aberdeen Stakes (1913); Toboggan Handicap (1913); Adirondack Handicap (1916); Fleetwing Handicap (1916); East View Stakes (1917); Stuyvesant Handicap (1917) American Classic Race wins: Kentucky Derby (1906); Belmont Stakes (1913) As a trainer: McLennan Handicap (1948); Widener Handicap (1948)

Significant horses
- Cairngorm, El Mono, Prince Eugene, Sir Huon
- Updated on October 22, 2020

Roscoe Troxler (June 15, 1883 – July 7, 1976) was an American jockey in the sport of thoroughbred horse racing who began riding in his early teens and by age fifteen was making an impression competing at the Crescent City Jockey Club's Fair Grounds Race Course in New Orleans. He was born in Nashville in 1883 and was orphaned by the age of 10. He rode for and was apprenticed by T.P. Hayes, the owner of Donerail. He went on to ride for another two decades during which time he had two mounts in the Kentucky Derby, winning in 1906 aboard Sir Huon and finishing second on Governor Gray in 1911. Troxler won his second American Classic in 1913, capturing the Belmont Stakes with H. P. Whitney's Prince Eugene in which he set a new track record of 2:18 flat for one and three-eighths miles.

Recognized for his ability to handle inexperienced two-year-olds, Roscoe Troxler rode at tracks across the United States as well as the 1916-17 winter meet at Agua Caliente Racetrack in Tijuana, Mexico where he had victories with nineteen of his fifty-seven mounts for a 33% winning percentage.

== As a trainer ==
Roscoe Troxler retired from riding in 1920 after seriously injuring himself in a fall at Pimlico Race Course. He then worked as a trainer until retiring in 1953. As a trainer, he enjoyed his best success with El Mono in 1948 at Florida's Hialeah Park Race Track. A four-year-old colt owned by Daniel Lamont of Altoona, Pennsylvania, El Mono won the McLennan Handicap and then the Widener Handicap in track record time beating U.S. Triple Crown Champion and future Hall of Fame inductee Assault plus another Hall of Fame inductee, Armed.

Thoroughbred racing was a way of life for Roscoe Troxler and in his nineties he was still working six days a week as a steward's aide at racetracks in the South Florida metropolitan area. He retired in May 1976, a few weeks before his ninety-third birthday and died at his home in Miami on July 7.
