= Sir Huon =

American-bred Thoroughbred racehorse

- Roscoe Troxler & Sir Huon, 1906 Kentucky Derby
- Sire: Falsetto
- Grandsire: Enquirer
- Dam: Ignite
- Damsire: Woodlands
- Sex: Stallion
- Foaled: 1903
- Country: United States
- Colour: Bay
- Breeder: George James Long
- Owner: Bashford Manor Stable
- Trainer: Peter Coyne
- Record: 18: 10-3-0
- Earnings: $38,980

Major wins
- Harold Stakes (1905); Queen City Handicap (Cincinnati) (1906); Latonia Derby (1906); Commonwealth Handicap (1906); Seagate Stakes (1906); American Classics race wins: Kentucky Derby (1906)

Sir Huon (foaled 1903 in Kentucky) was an American Thoroughbred racehorse that was the winner of the 1906 Kentucky Derby and Latonia Derby. Sir Huon was named after a character in the German opera Oberon and was bred at George J. Long's stud farm, Bashford Manor Stable. He was sired by the great turf-racer Falsetto, who was greatly aged by then at near thirty years old, out of the mare Ignite (by Woodlands).

Sir Huon won the 1906 Kentucky Derby, with Roscoe Troxler as his jockey, by two lengths over the filly Lady Navarre. His win was notable because it marked the first time since 1902 that a horse had won the Derby without racing as a three-year-old prior to running in the Derby. Sir Huon also won the 1905 Harold Stakes and in 1906 the Cincinnati Queen City Handicap, Commonwealth Handicap and Seagate Stakes.

Sir Huon was nominated to run in the 1908 Suburban Handicap but did not run in that race due to an injury. He was retired to stud in 1908 but did not produce any noteworthy offspring. However, he is an ancestor of a few Quarter horse lineages. In 1918, Sir Huon was given by George Long to the United States Army cavalry remount service as a sire for military horses.

== Pedigree ==
Pedigree of Sir Huon
Sire Falsetto 1876	Enquirer 1867	Leamington	Faugh-a-Ballagh
Sire Falsetto 1876	Enquirer 1867	Leamington	Pantaloon Mare
Sire Falsetto 1876	Enquirer 1867	Lida	Lexington
Sire Falsetto 1876	Enquirer 1867	Lida	Lize
Sire Falsetto 1876	Farfaletta 1867	Australian	West Australian
Sire Falsetto 1876	Farfaletta 1867	Australian	Emilia
Sire Falsetto 1876	Farfaletta 1867	Elkhorna	Lexington
Sire Falsetto 1876	Farfaletta 1867	Elkhorna	Glencona
Dam Ignite 1889	Woodlands 1872	Nutbourne	The Nabob
Dam Ignite 1889	Woodlands 1872	Nutbourne	Princess
Dam Ignite 1889	Woodlands 1872	Whiteface	Turnus
Dam Ignite 1889	Woodlands 1872	Whiteface	Nan Darrell
Dam Ignite 1889	Luminous 1883	Alarm	Eclipse
Dam Ignite 1889	Luminous 1883	Alarm	Maud
Dam Ignite 1889	Luminous 1883	Lady Lumley	Rataplan
Dam Ignite 1889	Luminous 1883	Lady Lumley	Schottische
