= Sydney Paget =

British racehorse owner (1857–1916)

- Born: 19 April 1857; Suffolk, England
- Died: 16 September 1916 (aged 59); London, England
- Spouse: Mary Elizabeth Dolan
- Parent(s): Alfred Paget & Cecilia Wyndham
- Relatives: Alexandra, Lady Colebrooke (d. 1944); Arthur Henry Fitzroy (1851–1928); Almeric Hugh (1861–1949)

Sydney Augustus Paget (19 April 1857 – 16 September 1916) was an English aristocrat who owned and raced Thoroughbred racehorses in the United States and who managed the racing operations for prominent owners, William C. Whitney and James Ben Ali Haggin.

== Background ==
Sydney Paget was the fifth son and twelfth child of Cecilia Wyndham and her husband, Lord Alfred Paget.

== Army ==
Sydney Paget served with the British Army in the Second Boer War, achieving the rank of Lieutenant with the machine gun section of the XIIth Yeomanry.

== Horse racing and management ==
Paget's brother, Almeric, married Pauline Payne Whitney, daughter of the enormously wealthy William C. Whitney who hired Sydney Paget to manage his New York Thoroughbred racing stable. Paget ran a ranch at Big Horn, Wyoming for William Whitney where he raised Thoroughbreds on the open range.

Among the other top horses Paget was involved with was the filly Hamburg Belle who won the prestigious Belmont Futurity Stakes in 1903. Hamburg Belle was owned by James Ben Ali Haggin but raced in Paget's name.

=== Paget racing stable ===
Near the end of the 1890s, Paget left the employ of W.C. Whitney to go on his own. In July 1898 he bought Kentucky Derby winner Plaudit from John E. Madden for $25,000. The horse continued to race successfully that year but broke down while training in early 1899 and was retired from racing. Paget sold Plaudit back to Madden for $12,000 who sent him to stand at stud at his Hamburg Place breeding farm near Lexington, Kentucky.

In the pre-U.S. Triple Crown era, Paget owned the American Champion Two-Year-Old Colt of 1898, Jean Bereaud. The colt went on to win the 1899 Belmont Stakes. Paget also won the 1905 Preakness Stakes with Cairngorm.

Paget died in London on 16 September 1916 at age 59.
