= 1920 Kentucky Derby =

Horse race

46th Kentucky Derby
- Kentucky Derby
- Grade I stakes race
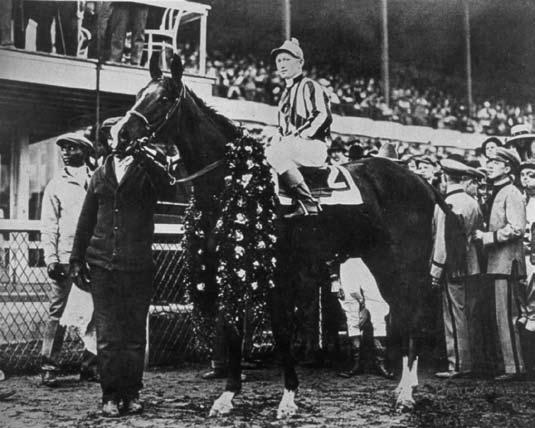
- Paul Jones after winning the 1920 Kentucky Derby
- Location: Churchill Downs
- Date: May 8, 1920
- Winning horse: Paul Jones
- Jockey: Ted Rice
- Trainer: William Garth
- Owner: Ral Parr
- Surface: Dirt

The 1920 Kentucky Derby was the 46th running of the Kentucky Derby. The race took place on May 8, 1920, and was run at a mile and one-quarter. Paul Jones won the race by a nose after staving off Upset, who showed impressive speed on the home stretch, and On Watch, who was a close third.

== Full results ==
Finished	Post	Horse	Jockey	Trainer	Owner	Time / behind
1st	2	Paul Jones	Ted Rice	William M. Garth	Ral Parr	2:09.00
2nd	5	Upset	José Rodriguez	James G. Rowe Sr.	Harry P. Whitney	Head
3rd	13	On Watch	Newton Barrett	Max Hirsch	George W. Loft	4
4th	8	Damask	Eddie Ambrose	Mose Goldblatt	Harry P. Whitney	4
5th	7	Donnacona	William O'Brien	Max Hirsch	George W. Loft	2
6th	15	Blazes	Clarence Kummer	William M. Garth	Ral Parr	4
7th	4	By Golly	Lawrence Lyke	Herbert J. Thompson	Edward R. Bradley	1/2
8th	14	Wildair	Laverne Fator	James G. Rowe Sr.	Harry P. Whitney	Head
9th	9	Bersagliere	Thomas Murray	James N. Evans	Gifford A. Cochran	Head
10th	6	Patches	Jack Hanover	Albert B. "Alex" Gordon	F. C. Bain	1/2
11th	1	Herron	James Butwell	William J. Daly	E. Alvarez	4
12th	10	Sandy Beal	J. Williams	Nathanial K. Beal	W. S. Murray	1/2
13th	3	Prince Pal	Andy Schuttinger	William M. Wallace	Simms & Oliver	1/2
14th	11	David Harum	Charles Fairbrother	William H. Karrick	William R. Coe	2
15th	12	Cleopatra	Linus McAtee	William H. Karrick	William R. Coe	1 1/2
16th	17	Peace Pennant	Mack Garner	Joseph S. Hawkins	William F. Polson	5
17th	16	Sterling	John Callahan	Charles C. Van Meter	Charles C. Van Meter	20

- Winning Breeder: John E. Madden; (KY)
- Horses Golden Broom, Kinnoul, Simpleton, Ethel Gray, and Westwood scratched before the race.

== Payout ==
Post	Horse	Win	Place	Show
2	Paul Jones	$ 34.40	12.30	6.60
5	Upset		3.20	3.00
13	On Watch			4.00

- The winner received a purse of $30,375.
- Second place received $4,000.
- Third place received $2,000.
- Fourth place received $275.
