= Whirl Stakes =

- Location: Empire City Race Track, Yonkers, New York, United States
- Inaugurated: 1908
- Race type: Thoroughbred - Flat racing

Race information
- Distance: 5.5 furlongs
- Surface: Dirt
- Track: left-handed
- Qualification: Two-year-olds
- Purse: $4,000 added

The Whirl Stakes was an American Thoroughbred horse race held annually at Empire City Race Track in Yonkers, New York. First run in 1908, it was created as a contest for three-year-old horses at a distance of one mile on dirt. Following the track's closure from 1911 through 1913 due to the passage of the Hart-Agnew Law by the New York State Legislature, there was no racing in New York state in 1911, 1912, and 1913. The Whirl Stakes returned in 1914 as a sprint race for two-year-old horses at a distance of five and a half furlongs. By 1925 the Whirl Stakes had become one of the Empire City Race Track's richest and most important races of its type run during its summer meet.

== Historical race notes ==
Friar Rock, a colt ridden by Clarence Turner, won the 1915 running in track record time.

In 1930 Vander Pool won what turned out to be the final edition of the Whirl Stakes. The victory marked the undefeated colt's ninth career win in a row and would keep his win streak going into 1931. Returning to Empire City Race Track, on July 25, 1931 the still undefeated Vander Pool won the Greenfield Purse, giving him fifteen straight races without a loss which equaled a twenty-three-year-old American record set by Colin during 1907/08.

== Records ==
Speed record:

- 1:03.80 @ 5½ furlongs : Friar Rock (1915)

Most wins by a jockey:

- 2 - Joe McCahey (1909, 1910)
- 2 - Clarence Turner (1915, 1925)
- 2 - Laverne Fator (1919, 1929)

Most wins by a trainer:

- 3 - Sam Hildreth (1915, 1921, 1929)

Most wins by an owner:

- 2 - James Butler (1914, 1926)
- 2 - Rancocas Stable (1921, 1929)
- 2 - Willis Sharpe Kilmer (1924, 1927)

== Winners ==
Year	Winner	Age	Jockey	Trainer	Owner	Dist. (Miles)	Time	Win $
1930	Vander Pool	2	Danny McAuliffe	Dave Robb McDaniel	Tennessee Stable (Agnes Allen)	5.5 F	1:07.60	$6,650
1929	Mokatam	2	Laverne Fator	Sam Hildreth	Rancocas Stable	5.5 F	1:08.00	$8,190
1928	Dr. Freeland	2	John Maiben	Thomas J. Healey	Walter J. Salmon Sr.	5.5 F	1:07.20	$8,610
1927	Sun Edwin	2	Eddie Ambrose	Henry McDaniel	Willis Sharpe Kilmer	5.5 F	1:07.00	$5,600
1926	Charade	2	Edgar Barnes	John Johnson	James Butler	5.5 F	1:06.00	$5,600
1925	Canter	2	Clarence Turner	Harry Rites	J. Edwin Griffith	5.5 F	1:06.40	$5,600
1924	Sunny Man	2	Ray Carter	Charles J. Casey	Willis Sharpe Kilmer	5.5 F	1:07.00	$5,500
1923	Lord Baltimore	2	George Babin	William M. Garth	Joshua S. Cosden	5.5 F	1:07.20	$5,550
1922	Bud Lerner	2	Earl Sande	Frank M. Taylor	John E. Madden	5.5 F	1:07.60	$5,050
1921	Little Chief	2	Laverne Fator	Sam Hildreth	Rancocas Stable	5.5 F	1:07.40	$5,450
1920	Pluribus	2	Ted Rice	Thomas J. Shannon	Thomas W. O'Brien	5.5 F	1:07.80	$4,675
1919	Carmandale	2	Laverne Fator	Richard F. Carman Sr.	Richard F. Carman Sr.	5.5 F	1:10.00	$3,900
1918	Sweep On	2	Charles Fairbrother	William H. Karrick	William R. Coe	5.5 F	1:06.00	$5,050
1917	Papp	2	Roscoe Troxler	Max Hirsch	George W. Loft	5.5 F	1:07.60	$4,150
1916	Harry Kelly	2	Guy Garner	George Land	John W. Schorr	5.5 F	1:07.20	$3,900
1915	Friar Rock	2	Clarence Turner	Sam Hildreth	August Belmont Jr.	5.5 F	1:03.80	$1,925
1914	Pebbles	2	John McCabe	Richard C. Benson	James Butler	5.5 F	1:08.00	$1,925
1913	No races held due to the Hart–Agnew Law							
1911/12	No races held due to the Hart–Agnew Law							
1910	Everett	3	Joe McCahey	George Cornnell	Quincy Stable (James Francis Johnson)	8 F	1:40.00	$1,150
1909	Arondack	3	Joe McCahey	James J. McLaughlin	Mrs. James J. McLaughlin	8 F	1:40.80	$870
1908	Golden Pearl	3	James Butler Jr.	John Schlosser	A. Jack Joyner	8 F	1:42.40	$3,045
