= 1923 Kentucky Derby =

Horse race

49th Kentucky Derby
- Kentucky Derby
- Location: Churchill Downs
- Date: May 19, 1923
- Winning horse: Zev
- Jockey: Earl Sande
- Trainer: David J. Leary
- Owner: Rancocas Farm
- Surface: Dirt

The 1923 Kentucky Derby was the 49th running of the Kentucky Derby. The race took place on May 19, 1923.

== Full results ==
Finished	Post	Horse	Jockey	Trainer	Owner	Time / behind
1st	11	Zev	Earl Sande	David J. Leary	Rancocas Farm	2:05.40
2nd	22	Martingale	Clarence Kummer	William M. Garth	Joshua S. Cosden	11/2
3rd	5	Vigil	Benny Marinelli	T. J. Healey	Walter J. Salmon Sr.	1
4th	8	Nassau	Mack Garner	Will Buford	Fred Johnson	1
5th	1	Chittagong	Jake Heupel	G. Hamilton Keene	Fannie Herz	Nose
6th	12	Enchantment	Linus McAtee	James G. Rowe Sr.	Harry Payne Whitney	11/2
7th	17	Rialto	Frank Coltiletti	James G. Rowe Sr.	Greentree Stable	2
8th	10	Aspiration	Bert Kennedy	Auval John Baker	Benjamin Block	2
9th	4	Prince K.	Willie Kelsay	L. F. Marshall	Marshall Bros.	11/2
10th	7	Bright Tomorrow	Clyde Ponce	Herbert J. Thompson	Edward R. Bradley	1/2
11th	21	In Memoriam	J. D. Mooney	George Land	Carl Weidemann	1/2
12th	20	Bo McMillan	Danny Connelly	Louis Cahn	T. J. Pendergast	1/2
13th	6	Better Luck	Albert Johnson	Fred Burlew	Benjamin Block	1
14th	13	Wida	August Yerrat	James H. Moody	T. E. Mueller	1
15th	18	Picketer	John Corcoran	James G. Rowe Sr.	Harry Payne Whitney	8
16th	14	General Thatcher	Clifford Robinson	Preston M. Burch	Nevada Stock Farm	2
17th	16	Calcutta	Granville Yeargin	Granville R. Allen	Granville R. Allen	2
18th	2	The Clown	Harry Lunsford	Kay Spence	Audley Farm Stable	1
19th	15	Golden Rule	Chick Lang	William M. Garth	Joshua S. Cosden	4
20th	3	Cherry Pie	Lester Penman	James G. Rowe Sr.	Greentree Stable	10
21st	14	Pravus	John Owens	C. R. Richards	F. Wieland	2

- Winning Breeder: John E. Madden; (KY)
- Horses Anna M. Humphrey, Chickvale, and Everhart scratched before the race.

== Payout ==
Post	Horse	Win	Place	Show
11	Zev	$ 40.40	30.60	18.40
22	Martingale		25.80	16.60
5	Vigil			12.30

- The winner received a purse of $53,600 and $5,000 Gold Cup.
- Second place received $6,000.
- Third place received $3,000.
- Fourth place received $1,000.
