= Nursery Handicap (Belmont Park) =

Nursery Stakes/Handicap
- Class: Discontinued stakes
- Location: Belmont Park, Elmont, New York, USA
- Inaugurated: 1866
- Race type: Thoroughbred - Flat racing

Race information
- Distance: 6 furlongs
- Surface: Dirt
- Track: Left-handed
- Qualification: Two-year-olds

The Nursery Stakes/Handicap was an American Thoroughbred horse race run in New York State for the first time on October 1, 1866 at Jerome Park Racetrack. Following the closure of that track after New York City had announced its decision to build the Jerome Park Reservoir on the property, the race was taken over by the Morris Park Racecourse. When that track closed after the 1904 running, it was transferred to Belmont Park where it would remain until its final running on September 27, 1938.

== Historical notes ==
The 1866 inaugural running of the Nursery Stakes was won by the filly Ruthless owned by Francis Morris whose son John would own the Morris Park Racecourse. The following year Ruthless would win the first edition of the Belmont Stakes, a race that would become the third leg of the U.S. Triple Crown series, ensuring her induction into the U.S. Racing Hall of Fame. Through 2020, Ruthless, Tanya (1905), and Rags to Riches (2007) are the only fillies to ever win the Belmont Stakes.

=== Locations ===
- 1866 - 1889: Jerome Park
- 1890 - 1904: Morris Park
- 1905 - 1938: Belmont Park

=== Distances ===
- 1 mile 1866 - 1876
- 3/4 mile 1877 - 1938

== Records ==
Speed record:

- 1:10.00 @ 6 furlongs: Dauber (1937)

Most wins by a jockey:

- 2 - Willie Simms (1893, 1895)
- 2 - John McTaggart (1915, 1916)

Most wins by a trainer:

- 4 - Jim McLaughlin (1902, 1903, 1904, 1909)

Most wins by an owner:

- 2 - John E. Madden (1897, 1924)
- 2 - Roslyn Dorothy McLaughlin (1904, 1909)
- 2 - Harry Payne Whitney (1905, 1919)
- 2 - Greentree Stable (1922, 1927)
- 2 - Belair Stud Stable (1931, 1938)

== Winners (1891-1938) ==
Year	Winner	Jockey	Trainer	Owner	Dist. (Miles)	Time	Win $
1938	Johnstown	James Stout	James E. Fitzsimmons	Belair Stud Stable	6 f	1:10.60	$
1937	Dauber	Ira Hanford	John A. Healey	Cornelius Vanderbilt Whitney	6 f	1:10.00	$
1936	Race not held						
1935-1	Hollyrood	Willie Saunders	Duval A. Headley	Hal Price Headley	6 f	1:11.00	$
1935-2	Coldstream	Paul Keester	Alex Gordon	Coldstream Stud (E. Dale Shaffer)	6 f	1:10.80	$
1934	Sound Advice	John Gilbert	James Rushton	Barbara M. West	6 f	1:11.60	$2,445
1933	Kawagoe	Pete Walls	A. Jack Joyner	George D. Widener Jr.	6 f	1:11.20	$1,825
1932	Quel Jeu	J. Long	George M. Odom	Arden Farms Stable	6 f	1:10.80	$3,600
1931	Faireno	Anthony Pascuma	James E. Fitzsimmons	Belair Stud Stable	6 f	1:11.20	$5,275
1930	Sunny Lassie	R. J. Fisher	Clyde Phillips	Middleburg Stable (Helen Murphy Ziegler)	6 f	1:11.20	$6,450
1929	Flying Heels	Willie Kelsay	Henry McDaniel	Gifford A. Cochran	6 f	1:11.00	$6,200
1928	Dr. Freeland	John Maiben	Thomas J. Healey	Walter J. Salmon Sr.	6 f	1:14.60	$5,725
1927	Prate	Sidney P. Hebert	Clyde Phillips	Greentree Stable	6 f	1:12.00	$6,100
1926	Osmand	Earl Sande	G. Hamilton Keene	Joseph E. Widener	6 f	1:13.00	$5,975
1925	Bubbling Over	Albert Johnson	Herbert J. Thompson	Idle Hour Farm Stable	6 f	1:11.40	$4,925
1924	Repulse	Edward J. Legere	William S. Walker	John E. Madden	6 f	1:12.80	$6,175
1923	Infinite	Mr. Smith	William James McKnight	Frederick Johnson	6 f	1:11.80	$3,750
1922	Cherry Pie	Lawrence Lyke	Scott P. Harlan	Greentree Stable	6 f	1:11.40	$4,950
1921	Snob II	Clifford Robinson	Hollie Hughes	John Sanford	6 f	1:11.20	$4,650
1920	Hildur	Clarence Kummer	H. Guy Bedwell	J. K. L. Ross	6 f	1:10.60	$4,925
1919	Dr. Clark	Ted Rice	James G. Rowe Sr.	Harry Payne Whitney	6 f	1:11.20	$3,600
1918	The Trump	George Walls	George Zeigler	Beverwyck Stable (Frank J. Nolan)	6 f	1:11.00	$2,700
1917	Jack Hare Jr.	Charles Peak	Frank D. Weir	William E. Applegate	6 f	1:11.40	$1,985
1916	Straight Forward	John McTaggart	Thomas J. Healey	Richard T. Wilson Jr.	6 f	1:11.00	$1,645
1915	Whimsy	John McTaggart	Frank Regan	Cleveland Stable (George W. Lebolt)	6 f	1:11.80	$1,065
1914	Sharpshooter	Kenneth Karrick	William H. Karrick	Schuyler L. Parsons	6 f	1:12.00	$1,340
1913	No races held due to the effects of the Hart–Agnew Law.						
1912	No races held due to the effects of the Hart–Agnew Law.						
1911	No races held due to the effects of the Hart–Agnew Law.						
1910	No races held due to the effects of the Hart–Agnew Law.						
1909	Fauntleroy	Joe McCahey	Jim McLaughlin	Roslyn Dorothy McLaughlin	6 f	1:12.00	$1,060
1908	Trance	Walter Miller	George M. Odom	George M. Odom	6 f	1:10.20	$6,650
1907	Dorante	Herbert Sumter	Raleigh Colston Jr.	Frederick W. Forsythe	6 f	1:13.60	$8,200
1906	W. H. Daniel	Joseph A. Jones	Henry McDaniel	Edmund S. Burke Jr.	6 f	1:11.80	$5,875
1905	Perverse	Willie Shaw	John W. Rogers	Harry Payne Whitney	6 f	1:12.40	$6,950
1904	Pasadena	Jack Martin	Jim McLaughlin	Roslyn Dorothy McLaughlin	6 f	1:12.00	$4,825
1903	Race King	Willie Gannon	Jim McLaughlin	Orville L. Richards	6 f	1:10.75	$7,125
1902	Eugenia Burch	Henry Spencer	Jim McLaughlin	Libby Curtis	6 f	1:12.50	$6,900
1901	King Hanover	Nash Turner	John W. Rogers	William C. Whitney	6 f	1:11.00	$6,735
1900	Bellario	Milton Henry	Fred Burlew	Newton Bennington	6 f	1:10.20	$5,920
1899	King's Courier	Clem J. Jenkins	H. Eugene Leigh	The Pepper Stable (Ella O. & James E. Pepper)	6 f	1:10.25	$6,560
1898	Ethelbert	John Cunningham	Edward Feakes	James Galway	6 f	1:12.25	$3,855
1897	Plaudit	Robert "Tiny" Williams	John E. Madden	John E. Madden	6 f	1:13.00	$3,850
1896	Celoso	Tod Sloan	Frank M. Taylor	Santa Anita Stable	6 f	1:14.00	$3,050
1895	Ben Brush	Willie Simms	Hardy Campbell Jr.	Michael F. Dwyer	6 f	1:11.75	$2,787
1894	Brandywine	Henry Griffin	John W. Rogers	Perry Belmont	6 f	1:12.00	$5,390
1893	Patrician	Willie Simms	Frank McCabe	Philip J. Dwyer	6 f	1:13.00	$6,980
1892	Runyon	John Lamley	Matthew M. Allen	Frank A. Ehret	6 f	1:13.00	$4,290
1891	Yorkville Belle	Isaac Burns Murphy	Matthew M. Allen	Fred C. McLewee	6 f	1:11.00	$13,880
