= Spring Juvenile Stakes =

- Class: Discontinued stakes
- Location: Pimlico Race Course; Baltimore, Maryland, USA
- Inaugurated: 1917
- Race type: Thoroughbred – Flat racing

Race information
- Distance: 4.5 furlongs
- Surface: Dirt
- Track: left-handed
- Qualification: Two-year-olds

The Spring Juvenile Stakes was an American Thoroughbred horse race held annually during the first part of May from 1917 through 1930 at Pimlico Race Course in Baltimore, Maryland. A race for two-year-olds of either sex, it was run on dirt over a distance of four and one-half furlongs. At the time the Spring Juvenile Stakes was created Pimlico already had the Nursery Stakes which was run under the exact same terms and distance. Careful in 1920 and Lord Baltimore in 1921 marked the only two times the Spring Juvenile winner also won the Pimlico Nursery Stakes.

== Historical notes ==
The inaugural running of the Spring Juvenile Stakes took place on May 12, 1917, and was won by Edward McBride's colt Charlie Leydecker who defeated Quietude, the betting favorite owned by Alfred H. Morris.

In 1920 Walter J. Salmon Sr.'s Careful won the race under Hall of Fame jockey James Butwell. Careful would be named that year's American Co-Champion Two-Year-Old Filly, sharing the honor with Harry Payne Whitney's Prudery. Careful went on to earn a second national title as the American Champion Older Female Horse of 1922. Lord Baltimore set a new track record time in winning the 1921 race. In so doing, the Daily Racing Form noted he had beaten the best two-year-olds at Pimlico. Careful and Lord Baltimore were the only winners of the Spring Juvenile who also won the Pimlico Nursery Stakes.

== Demise ==
The Wall Street crash of 1929 marked the beginning of the Great Depression which would soon force racetrack owners to cut purse money for all races and to cancel others. Pimlico already had the Nursery Stakes open to all, and the Home-Bred Stakes for Maryland-bred two-year-olds, both of which were at the same distance as the Spring Juvenile Stakes. Because the Nursery Stakes had the higher profile as a stakes first run in 1909, and the importance of promoting breeding in the state of Maryland, it would be the Spring Juvenile Stakes that would be dropped from the schedule.

== Records ==
Speed record:

- 53 3/5 – Up (1930)

Most wins by a jockey:

- 2 – Edgar Barnes (1924, 1925)

Most wins by a trainer:

- No trainer won this race more than once.

Most wins by an owner:

- 2 – Walter J. Salmon Sr. (1920, 1928)

== Winners ==
Year	Winner	Age	Jockey	Trainer	Owner	Dist. (Miles)	Time	Win$
1930	Up	2	Frank Coltiletti	Preston M. Burch	James Nugent Crofton	0:53.60	4.5 F	$5,610
1929	Mint Olga	2	George Fields	Andrew G. Blakely	Willis Sharpe Kilmer	0:55.00	4.5 F	$6,280
1928	Dunkirk	2	Louis Schaefer	Thomas J. Healey	Walter J. Salmon Sr.	0:56.20	4.5 F	$6,220
1927	All Callao	2	Ovila Bourassa	Clyde Phillips	Greentree Stable	0:54.60	4.5 F	$5,740
1926	The Heathen	2	John Callahan	William R. Midgley Sr.	C. Harvey Pierce	0:54.00	4.5 F	$4,840
1925	Silver Finn	2	Edgar Barnes	William Durnan	Flamingo Stable	0:54.40	4.5 F	$4,820
1924	Extreme	2	Edgar Barnes	Matthew Smart	Samuel Ross	0:55.80	4.5 F	$3,750
1923	June Flower	2	Andy Schuttinger	Roy Waldron	Xalapa Farm Stable	0:54.20	4.5 F	$4,050
1922	St. Valentine	2	Frank Keogh	Harry Rites	J. Edwin Griffith	0:54.00	4.5 F	$2,050
1921	Lord Baltimore	2	Ted Rice	William M. Garth	Joshua S. Cosden	0:53.60	4.5 F	$2,150
1920	Careful	2	Willie Kelsay	Eugene Wayland	Walter J. Salmon Sr.	0:54.40	4.5 F	$2,150
1919	Kallipolis	2	George Corey	Nathaniel K. Beal	John H. Shreeve	0:55.00	4.5 F	$2,200
1918	Madam Byng	2	Lawrence Lyke	Arthur Brent	W. A. Gamble	0:54.80	4.5 F	$3,250
1917	Charlie Leydecker	2	John Metcalf	William Livingston	Edward McBride	0:59.60	4.5 F	$1,680
