= Willie Kelsay =

Personal information
- Born: October 20, 1892 Antelope, Oregon, United States
- Died: April 26, 1952 (aged 59) Miami Beach, Florida; United States
- Resting place: Woodlawn Park North, Miami, Florida

Horse racing career
- Sport: Horse racing

Major racing wins
- Coffroth Handicap (1917); Latonia Independence Handicap (1917); Latonia Autumn Inaugural Handicap (1917); Excelsior Stakes (1918, 1931); Laurel Handicap (1918); Schuylerville Stakes (1919, 1920); Aberdeen Stakes (1920, 1930); Clover Stakes (1920); Colorado Stakes (1920); Pimlico Nursery Stakes (1920); Spring Juvenile Stakes (1920); Autumn Stakes (1921); Paumonok Handicap (1921); Saratoga Cup (1921); Merchants and Citizens Handicap (1921, 1924); Cuban Derby (1922); Cuban Grand National Handicap (1922); Breeders' Futurity Stakes 1923); Delaware Handicap (1924, 1930); Fashion Stakes (1927); Highland Stakes (1927); Bowie Handicap (1928); Champagne Stakes (1928); Dwyer Stakes (1928); Empire City Derby (1928, 1929); Scarsdale Handicap (1928, 1931); Demoiselle Stakes (1929); Pimlico Futurity (1929); Nursery Handicap (1929); Remsen Stakes (1929); Tijuana Futurity (1929); Westchhester Handicap (1929); Carter Handicap (1930); Hopeful Stakes (1930); Fleetwing Handicap (1930); Manhattan Handicap (1930); Youthful Stakes (1930, 1931); Montana Handicap (1932)

Significant horses
- Bateau, Billy Barton, Careful, Cudgel, Exterminator, George Smith, Milkmaid, Spinaway, Vander Pool

William Lloyd Kelsay (October 20, 1892 – April 26, 1952) was one of the top jockeys in American Thoroughbred racing during the 1920s who was widely respected for his ability to handle two-year-old horses during their first year of racing.

== Racing career highlights ==
In 1917 Kelsay won the inaugural running of the Coffroth Handicap in Tijuana, a race run in February that became a major event for horsemen on the West Coast of the United States. The race would attract such star runners as Australia's superhorse Phar Lap and the popular future U.S. Racing Hall of Fame inductees Seabiscuit and Round Table.

Riding for the stable of Walter Salmon, in 1920 Kelsay was aboard the filly Careful in nine of her starts and won all of them. Included in those nine starts were stakes race wins in the Aberdeen, Clover, Colorado, Pimlico Nursery, Schuylerville and the Spring Juvenile Stakes en route to her earning American Co-Champion Two-Year-Old Filly honors.

In 1921, former jockey turned trainer Willie Knapp put Kelsay on the future Hall of Fame gelding Exterminator to win the Autumn Stakes at the Old Woodbine Race Course in Toronto, Canada.

Competing at Havana's Oriental Park Racetrack in 1922, Willie Kelsay had wins in two premier events that regularly drew some of the top American stables. On February 12 he rode the Goldapple Stables' colt Billy Barton to victory in the Cuban Grand National Handicap for trainer Frank Bray. Then, on March 27 Kelsay won the Cuban Derby aboard Thomas Monahan's colt Rebuke, again for trainer Frank Bray.

Willie Kelsay suffered a broken kneecap on March 2, 1926, while competing at Tijuana for the stable owned by Gifford Cochran. His injury did not heal and he returned to the East Coast where in June he underwent surgery at Roosevelt Hospital in Midtown Manhattan. By the end of October he was back to riding and winning.

Among Kelsay's other significant wins, in 1928 and 1929 he rode the winner of the Empire City Derby and in 1930 won the Carter, Fleetwing and Manhattan Handicaps, plus the Hopeful Stakes, all of which were for Gifford Cochran's stable under future Hall of Fame trainer, Henry McDaniel.

In 1929 Willie Kelsay played a significant role in the development of Gifford Cochran's two-year-old colt Flying Heels, winning the Nursery Handicap, Pimlico Futurity, and Remsen Handicap. The following year, Kelsay was part of another success story with a two-year-old horse when he rode the undefeated Vander Pool to win the 1930 editions of the Youthful, Bowie Kindergarten and Aberdeen Stakes, the latter a race he had earlier won with Careful.

Willie Kelsay was retired and living in Miami Beach, Florida when he died at age 59 on April 26, 1952.
