= Paumonok Handicap =

- Class: Discontinued Stakes
- Location: Aqueduct Racetrack; Queens, New York, United States
- Inaugurated: 1906
- Race type: Thoroughbred – Flat racing
- Website: www.nyra.com

Race information
- Distance: 6 furlong sprint
- Surface: Dirt
- Track: left-handed
- Qualification: Three-years-old & up
- Weight: Handicap
- Purse: $65,000

The Paumonok Handicap was an American Thoroughbred horse race held annually at Aqueduct Racetrack in Queens, New York. A six furlong sprint race, it was open to horses aged three years and older.

The race was inaugurated in 1906 at the now defunct Jamaica Racetrack in Jamaica, Queens, New York. It was hosted by the Jamaica track from 1906 to 1908 and from 1915 to 1959.

Belmont Park hosted it in 1913.

Due to the passage by the New York Legislature of the Hart–Agnew Law outlawing gambling in New York State, there was no race run in 1909, 1911, 1912, and 1914.

The Paumonok Handicap was run in two divisions in 1943 and again in 1975.

== Records ==
Speed record:

- 1:08.86 Don Six (2005)
- 1:08.80 Duck Dance (1972)

Most wins:

- 2 – Red River (1907, 1908)
- 2 – Silver Fox (1926, 1927)
- 2 – Devil Diver (1944, 1945)
- 2 – True And Blue (1990, 1991)
- 2 – Bishop Court Hill (2006, 2007)

Most wins by a jockey:

- 5 – Laverne Fator (1923, 1926, 1927, 1929. 1933)

Most wins by a trainer:

- 5 – Sam Hildreth (1910, 1923, 1926, 1927, 1929)
- 5 – James E. Fitzsimmons (1938, 1939, 1940, 1941, 1943)

Most wins by an owner:

- 4 – Rancocas Stable (1923, 1926, 1927, 1929)

== Winners ==
Year	Winner	Age	Jockey	Trainer	Owner	Dist. (Miles)	Time	Win $	Gr.
2010	Wall Street Wonder	4	Channing Hill	John Terranova II	Stetson Stables	6 f	1:09.40	$39,000	
2009	True Quality	4	Chuck Lopez	John P. Campo Jr.	Paraneck Stable	6 f	1:10.92	$41,598	
2008	Lord Snowdon	5	Ramon Domínguez	Anthony W. Dutrow	Dubb, Goldfarb, Robbins	6 f	1:10.20	$48,960	
2007	Bishop Court Hill	7	José A. Santos	Todd A. Pletcher	Melnyk Racing Stables	6 f	1:09.20	$41,535	
2006	Bishop Court Hill	6	José A. Santos	Todd A. Pletcher	Melnyk Racing Stables	6 f	1:09.47	$42,066	
2005	Don Six	5	Aaron Gryder	Scott A. Lake	Patricia A. Generazio	6 f	1:08.86	$49,620	
2004	Peeping Tom	7	Ariel Smith	Patrick L. Reynolds	Flatbird Stable	6 f	1:10.40	$49,815	
2003	Crossing Point	6	Ryan Fogelsonger	Benjamin Feliciano Jr.	Nancy Clark & Fred Heyman	6 f	1:09.80	$48,330	
2002	Wrangler	4	Aaron Gryder	James A. Jerkens	Stronach Stable	6 f	1:09.00	$48,435	
2001	Lexicon	6	Aaron Gryder	Richard E. Mandella	Jerry Moss	6 f	1:09.00	$48,555	
2000	Falkenburg	5	Joe Bravo	Joseph Orseno	Stronach Stable	6 f	1:09.80	$49,170	
1999	Esteemed Friend	5	Mike Luzzi	Joseph Imperio	Chi Ki Liu & Imperio	6 f	1:09.60	$40,032	
1998	King Roller	7	Aaron Gryder	Mitchell Friedman	Christopher Hagedorn	6 f	1:10.80	$38,916	
1997	Cold Execution	6	Julio Pezua	Pancho Martin	Viola Sommer	6 f	1:10.40	$32,730	
1996	Hay Cody	4	Joe Bravo	John F. Dowd	Carolyn Hulak	6 f	1:09.60	$33,060	
1995	Crafty Alfel	7	Julio Pezua	Charles Carlesimo	James Fabricatore	6 f	1:10.20	$33,000	
1994	Secret Odds	4	Mike Luzzi	Lawrence Murray	Sondra D. Bender	6 f	1:10.40	$33,210	
1993	R.D. Wild Whirl	5	Mike E. Smith	Steve E. Rowan	Robert W. Dommel	6 f	1:09.60	$52,560	
1992	Shuttleman	6	Ángel Cordero Jr.	Richard E. Dutrow	Jose A. Birriel Jr.	6 f	1:11.00	$51,210	
1991	True And Blue	6	Julie Krone	Anthony W. Dutrow	Robert J. Bauer	6 f	1:10.40	$52,200	
1990	True And Blue	5	José A. Santos	Gasper S. Moschera	Barbara J. Davis	6 f	1:11.00	$51,750	
1989	High Brite	5	Ángel Cordero Jr.	D. Wayne Lukas	H. Joseph Allen	6 f	1:09.20	$51,120	
1988	Vinnie The Viper	5	Julie Krone	Robert P. Klesaris	Lazer II Stable	6 f	1:10.20	$51,120	
1987	Best By Test	5	José A. Santos	John J. Lenzini Jr.	Cedar Valle Stable	6 f	1:09.40	$41,880	
1986	Bolting Holme	5	Eddie Maple	Robert L. Wheeler	Herman M. Braude	6 f	1:10.20	$41,100	
1985	Entropy	5	Jerry D. Bailey	Jan H. Nerud	Tartan Stable	6 f	1:10.40	$41,640	
1984	Space Mountain	5	Antonio Graell	Michael Sedlacek	Oak Manor Farm	6 f	1:11.00	$42,540	
1983	In From Dixie	6	Angel Santiago	Edward I. Kelly Sr.	Brookfield Farms	6 f	1:11.40	$32,880	
1982	Contare	6	Eric Beitia	Sidney Watters Jr.	Stephen C. Clark Jr.	6 f	1:10.20	$32,520	
1981	Dr. Blum	4	Ruben Hernandez	Howard M. Tesher	H. Joseph Allen	6 f	1:10.40	$32,580	
1980	Amadevil	6	Herb McCauley	Orville Kemling	Paul Kemling	6 f	1:11.40	$33,420	
1979	Vencedor	5	Ruben Hernandez	Luis Barrera	Armando Cosme	6 f	1:10.00	$32,460	
1978	Great Above	6	Eddie Maple	Pancho Martin	Sigmund Sommer	6 f	1:11.20	$32,040	G3
1977	Whatsyourpleasure	4	Menotti Aristone	Benjamin W. Perkins Sr.	Mrs. Arnold Willcox	6 f	1:10.60	$31,680	G3
1976	Gallant Bob	4	Gerland Gallitano	Joseph Marguette	Robert Horton	6 f	1:10.80	$33,180	G3
1975-1	Hudson County	4	Eddie Maple	Stanley R. Shapoff	Robert B. Cohen	6 f	1:10.40	$26,970	G3
1975-2	Princely Native	4	Braulio Baeza	Lazaro S. Barrera	Harbor View Farm	6 f	1:10.80	$27,420	G3
1974	Torsion	4	Jorge Velásquez	John P. Campo	Buckland Farm	6 f	1:09.60	$33,840	G3
1973	North Sea	4	Robyn Smith	Robert P. Lake	Alfred G. Vanderbilt II	6 f	1:09.60	$16,470	G3
1972	Duck Dance	5	John Ruane	H. Allen Jerkens	Hobeau Farm	6 f	1:08.80	$17,040	
1971	Forum	4	Robert Woodhouse	Eugene Jacobs	Herbert A. Allen Sr.	6 f	1:09.80	$20,070	
1970	Best Turn	4	Chuck Baltazar	Frank A. Bonsal	Calumet Farm	6 f	1:10.20	$17,907	
1969	Pappa Steve	4	Jorge Velásquez	Raymond Metcalf	Steven B. Wilson	6 f	1:09.80	$17,485	
1968	Air King 2d	6	Sandino Hernandez	Angel Penna Sr.	Stud Quito	6 f	1:10.00	$17,745	
1967	Our Michael	4	Robert Ussery	John Gainer	Edgehill Farm	6 f	1:12.60	$17,745	
1966	Seaman	4	John L. Rotz	Max Hirsch	King Ranch	6 f	1:10.20	$18,200	
1965	Cupid	4	William Mahorney	Theodore Saladin	Bert W. Martin	6 f	1:11.20	$18,005	
1964	Ahoy	4	Howard Grant	J. Bowes Bond	Jaclyn Stable	6 f	1:09.20	$18,005	
1963	Kisco Kid	5	Hedley Woodhouse	George C. Frostad	George C. Frostad	6 f	1:09.20	$18,135	
1962	Rideabout	4	Jack Leonard	John A. Nerud	Tartan Stable	6 f	1:11.40	$19,045	
1961	Pied d'or	4	John L. Rotz	Horace A. Jones	Calumet Farm	6 f	1:10.80	$18,070	
1960	Sir Salonga	4	Henry Moreno	Tommy Root	Stella G. Steckler	6 f	1:11.00	$18,907	
1959	Isendu	4	Bill Shoemaker	Edward I. Kelly Sr.	Brookfeld Farms	6 f	1:10.80	$17,672	
1958	Admiral Vee	6	Willie Lester	H. Allen Jerkens	Edward Seinfeld	6 f	1:11.20	$15,285	
1957	Jet Action	6	Eric Guerin	W. L. "Duke" McCue	Maine Chance Farm	6 f	1:11.20	$16,000	
1956	Nance's Lad	4	John Choquette	Hilton Dabson	Hilton Dabson	6 f	1:11.60	$15,450	
1955	Bobby Brocato	4	Ray Broussard	William Molter	Joe W. Brown	6 f	1:10.60	$20,500	
1954	White Skies	5	Eddie Arcaro	Tommy Root	William M. Wickham	6 f	1:10.80	$21,100	
1953	Squared Away	4	Jimmy Nichols	G. Carey Winfrey	Mrs. Jan Burke	6 f	1:10.20	$20,650	
1952	Woodchuck	4	James Stout	Joseph H. Pierce Sr.	Palatine Stable (Frank Rosen)	6 f	1:09.80	$20,400	
1951	Ferd	4	Ted Atkinson	Andy Schuttinger	Mrs. Andy Schuttinger	6 f	1:11.20	$20,650	
1950	Olympia	4	Eddie Arcaro	Ivan H. Parke	Fred W. Hooper	6 f	1:10.80	$21,400	
1949	Rippey	6	Eddie Arcaro	Edward L. Snyder	William G. Helis	6 f	1:12.40	$21,050	
1948	Better Self	6	Warren Mehrtens	Max Hirsch	King Ranch	6 f	1:11.80	$24,650	
1947	Fighting Frank	4	Paul Glidewell	H. H. "Pete" Battle	Mrs. Louise S. Donovan	6 f	1:11.20	$15,500	
1946	Fighting Step	4	George South	Charles C. Norman	Murlogg Farm (Helen Kellogg)	6 f	1:10.80	$8,000	
1945	Devil Diver	6	Eddie Arcaro	John M. Gaver Sr.	Greentree Stable	6 f	1:10.80	$5,730	
1944	Devil Diver	5	Ted Atkinson	John M. Gaver Sr.	Greentree Stable	6 f	1:11.20	$6,625	
1943-1	With Regards	4	James Stout	Ted D. Grimes	Mrs. J. Grimes	6 f	1:12.20	$5,900	
1943-2	Apache	4	Johnny Longden	James E. Fitzsimmons	Belair Stud	6 f	1:12.00	$6,100	
1942	Potranco	5	Paul Keiper	Leonard J. Wilson	M. A. & L. D. Kern	6 f	1:14.00	$7,000	
1941	King Cole	3	Porter Roberts	James E. Fitzsimmons	Ogden Phipps	6 f	1:11.80	$6,600	
1940	Fighting Fox	5	James Stout	James E. Fitzsimmons	Belair Stud	6 f	1:11.80	$6,400	
1939	Johnstown	3	James Stout	James E. Fitzsimmons	Belair Stud	6 f	1:11.20	$6,850	
1938	Snark	5	Johnny Longden	James E. Fitzsimmons	Wheatley Stable	6 f	1:11.60	$6,450	
1937	Pompoon	3	Harry Richards	Cyrus Field Clarke	Jerome H. Louchheim	6 f	1:11.00	$7,250	
1936	Cycle	5	Robert Merritt	Philip M. Walker	Howe Stable	6 f	1:11.40	$5,650	
1935	King Saxon	4	Cal Rainey	Charles H. Knebelkamp	Charles H. Knebelkamp	6 f	1:10.80	$6,690	
1934	Sgt. Byrne	3	Sam Renick	James Ritchie	John Simonetti	6 f	1:11.60	$2,440	
1933	Pilate	5	Laverne Fator	Andy Schuttinger	Andy Schuttinger	6 f	1:12.60	$2,090	
1932	Questionnaire	5	Alfred Robertson	Edward J. Bennett	James Butler	6 f	1:12.20	$5,900	
1931	Protractor	5	Sidney P. Herbert	Louis Feustel	Leo Perry	6 f	1:12.00	$6,300	
1930	Sarazen	3	Pete Walls	Max Hirsch	Fair Stable	6 f	1:13.00	$6,700	
1929	Mei Foo	3	Laverne Fator	Sam Hildreth	Rancocas Stable	6 f	1:14.00	$6,650	
1928	Polydor	3	Mack Garner	William J. Spiers	William Ziegler Jr.	6 f	1:14.00	$6,950	
1927	Silver Fox	5	Laverne Fator	Sam Hildreth	Rancocas Stable	6 f	1:12.60	$7,850	
1926	Silver Fox	4	Laverne Fator	Sam Hildreth	Rancocas Stable	6 f	1:12.00	$6,900	
1925	Worthmore	4	Earl Sande	John S. Ward	Everglade Stable	6 f	1:12.00	$6,000	
1924	St. James	3	Clarence Kummer	A. Jack Joyner	George D. Widener Jr.	6 f	1:11.60	$4,650	
1923	Zev	3	Laverne Fator	Sam Hildreth	Rancocas Stable	6 f	1:12.00	$4,650	
1922	Tryster	4	L. Penman	James G. Rowe Jr.	Harry Payne Whitney	6 f	1:11.40	$4,650	
1921	On Watch	4	Willie Kelsay	Max Hirsch	George W. Loft	6 f	1:13.20	$4,800	
1920	Dunboyne	4	Ted Rice	James H. McCormick	Philip A. Clark	6 f	1:12.40	$3,850	
1919	Flags	4	Lawrence Lyke	G. Carey Winfrey	Beach Stable	6 f	1:12.40	$4,850	
1918	Old Koenig	5	George Byrne	George Zeigler	Beverwyck Stable	6 f	1:12.40	$3,850	
1917	Kewessa	7	Eddie Ambrose	William L. Oliver	William L. Oliver	6 f	1:12.00	$2,325	
1916	Sand Marsh	4	Andy Schuttinger	Richard O. Miller	Fred E. Rose	6 f	1:12.20	$1,925	
1915	Coquette	3	George Byrne	A. Jack Goldsborough	Matthew Corbett	6 f	1:13.00	$1,475	
1914	Race not held								
1913	Spring Board	4	Tommy Davies	J. Simon Healy	Edward B. Cassatt	6 f	1:12.80	$1,730	
1911	1912	Race not held							
1910	Restigouche	5	Carroll Shilling	Sam Hildreth	Sam Hildreth	6 f	1:12.00	$1,050	
1909	Race not held								
1908	Red River	4	Eddie Dugan	Thomas J. Healey	Richard T. Wilson Jr.	6 f	1:12.60	$1,705	
1907	Red River	3	R. Lowe	Thomas J. Healey	Richard T. Wilson Jr.	6 f	1:13.20	$1,770	
1906	Inquisitor	3	Walter Miller	Thomas Welsh	Thomas Welsh	6 f	1:13.20	$1,730	
