= Juvenile Stakes (United States) =

- Class: Discontinued stakes
- Location: Belmont Park; Elmont, New York, United States
- Inaugurated: 1874–1984
- Race type: Thoroughbred – Flat racing

Race information
- Distance: 5.5 furlongs (0.69 mi)
- Surface: Dirt
- Track: left-handed
- Qualification: Two years-old

The Juvenile Stakes was a Thoroughbred horse race run for 110 years between 1874 and 1984. First run on June 13, 1874, it was an important part of Jerome Park's "Spring Meeting." The race was designed to show which were the top two-year-olds at that point in the calendar.

== Historical notes ==
The Juvenile Stakes was run at four different tracks:
Jerome Park Racetrack (1874–1888)
Morris Park Racecourse (1889–1904)
Belmont Park (1905–1959, 1968–1973, 1975, 1977–1984)
Aqueduct Racetrack (1960–1967, 1974, 1976)

A field of fifteen competed in the inaugural edition won by Meco, a colt owned and trained by South Carolina native Thomas Puryear.

In 1888, French Park and Fides finished in a dead heat for first. It would remain as the only such occurrence in the 109 runnings of the event.

With the implementation of the Graded Stakes system in 1973, for that first year and again in 1974 the Juvenile Stakes was given Grade 3 status.

=== Selected notable winners ===
The 1886 running of the Juvenile Stakes was won by Tremont who would finish the year, and career, the undefeated winner of all his thirteen starts.

Broomstick won the 1903 edition of the Juvenile and continued with a stellar career in racing. At stud, he was the Leading sire in North America three times and would be inducted into U.S. Racing Hall of Fame.

In 1919, the filly Bonnie Mary won the Juvenile in which she beat twelve male and three female competitors including the very good runner-up On Watch, a colt owned by George W. Loft and trained by U.S. Racing Hall of Fame inductee Max Hirsch. The third-place finisher was Upset, the only horse to ever defeat the legendary Man o' War.

Following a win in his career debut at Florida's Hialeah Park, on May 4, 1963 Raise a Native made his second start at New York's Aqueduct Racetrack. The colt, owned by Louis Wolfson and trained by Burley Parke, was ridden by future Hall of Fame jockey Bobby Ussery in an Allowance race for two-year-olds. In what the New York Times described as a breathtaking performance, Raise a Native won by eight lengths while setting a new Aqueduct track record of 57 4/5 for five furlongs on dirt. On May 31, Raise a Native equaled his own track record in winning Aqueduct's Juvenile Stakes. The colt would go on to be named that year's American Champion Two-Year-Old Male Horse.

Four winners of the Juvenile Stakes went on to earn American Horse of the Year honors as well as a place in the U.S. Racing Hall of Fame:
Blue Larkspur (1928)
Equipoise (1930)
Nashua (1954)
Bold Ruler (1956)

== Records ==
Speed record:

- 0:47.25 @ 4 furlongs – Osric (1891)
- 0:53.80 @ 5 furlongs – Bally Ache (1959)
- 1:03.40 @ 5.5 furlongs – Tilt Up (1977)

Most wins by a jockey:

- 7 – Eddie Arcaro (1939, 1946, 1953, 1954, 1955, 1956, 1958)

Most wins by a trainer:

- 6 – James G. Rowe Sr. (1881, 1885, 1888, 1900, 1920, 1924)

Most wins by an owner:

- 4 – George L. Lorillard (1879, 1880, 1883, 1884)
- 4 – Dwyer Brothers Stable (1881, 1885, 1886, 1887)
- 4 – Greentree Stable (1933, 1934, 1962, 1974)
- 4 – Calumet Farm (1941, 1971, 1975, 1978)

== Winners ==
Year	Winner	Age	Jockey	Trainer	Owner	Dist. (Furlongs)	Time	Win$
1984	Sky Command	2	Garth Patterson	James A. Padgett	Warren Kemper	5.5 F	1:05.60	$44,640
1983	Fight Over	2	Don MacBeth	John Parisella	Bwamazon Farm	5.5 F	1:05.60	$33,840
1982	Victorious	2	Ángel Cordero Jr.	Eugene Jacobs	Herbert A. Allen Sr.	5.5 F	1:05.60	$32,940
1981	Center Cut	2	Gene St. Leon	Al W. Hinson	Charles Neal	5.5 F	1:04.00	$33,240
1980	Lord Avie	2	Jerry D. Bailey	Daniel Perlsweig	S.K.S. Stable (Michael Kay et al.)	5.5 F	1:04.60	$32,280
1979	Muckraker	2	Ruben Hernandez	Roger Laurin	Leone J. Peters	5.5 F	1:04.00	$24,765
1978	Tim The Tiger	2	Jeffrey Fell	John M. Veitch	Calumet Farm	5.5 F	1:03.80	$21,000
1977	Tilt Up	2	Jacinto Vásquez	LeRoy Jolley	Bertram R. Firestone	5.5 F	1:03.40	$21,900
1976	To The Quick	2	Eddie Maple	Anthony L. Basile	Bwamazon Farm	5.5 F	1:04.80	$22,155
1975	Turn To Turia	2	Ángel Cordero Jr.	Reggie Cornell	Calumet Farm	5.5 F	1:03.60	$16,440
1974	Knightly Sport	2	Jacinto Vásquez	John M. Gaver Sr.	Greentree Stable	5.5 F	1:04.40	$17,790
1973	Who Duzzit	2	Chuck Baltazar	Reggie Cornell	Mrs. Moody Jolley	5.5 F	1:05.00	$16,185
1972	Linda's Chief	2	Braulio Baeza	Alfred A. Scotti	Neil Hellman	5.5 F	1:03.80	$16,440
1971	Plum Bold	2	Eddie Maple	Reggie Cornell	Calumet Farm	5.5 F	1:04.20	$23,850
1970	Helio Rise	2	Chuck Baltazar	David Erb	Roger W. & R. T. Wilson Jr.	5.5 F	1:05.80	$23,667
1969	Prize Silver	2	Manuel Ycaza	Ivor G. Balding	Cornelius Vanderbilt Whitney	5.5 F	1:05.40	$22,928
1968	Cicada's Pride	2	Braulio Baeza	Casey Hayes	Meadow Stable	5.5 F	1:06.00	$22,213
1967	Kaskaskia	2	Bill Shoemaker	Del W. Carroll	William S. Farish III	5 F	0:58.00	$24,748
1966	Native Prince	2	Ray Broussard	Raymond Metcalf	Edward R. Scharps	5 F	0:58.20	$24,765
1965	Our Michael	2	Johnny Sellers	Jimmy Pitt	Edgehill Farm (Leonard & Morris Fruchtman)	5 F	0:58.20	$23,806
1964	Golden Joey	2	Bobby Ussery	Buddy Jacobson	Marion R. Frankel	5 F	0:59.00	$23,010
1963	Raise a Native	2	John L. Rotz	Burley Parke	Louis Wolfson	5 F	0:57.80	$23,010
1962	Catullus	2	Braulio Baeza	John Gaver Sr.	Greentree Stable	5 F	0:58.40	$24,001
1961	Sunrise County	2	Bobby Ussery	Tommy Kelly	Townsend B. Martin	5 F	0:59.40	$24,488
1960	Iron Rail	2	Herb Hinojosa	Stanley M. Rieser	Donald G. Ford Sr.	5 F	0:58.00	$24,082
1959	Bally Ache	2	Sam Boulmetis Sr.	Jimmy Pitt	Edgehill Farm (Leonard & Morris Fruchtman)	5 F	0:53.80	$22,657
1958	First Landing	2	Eddie Arcaro	Casey Hayes	Meadow Stable	5 F	0:57.00	$22,360
1957	Li'l Fella	2	Bill Hartack	Sidney Jacobs	Jaclyn Stable (William S. Paley & Leon Levy)	5 F	0:56.60	$23,575
1956	Bold Ruler	2	Eddie Arcaro	James E. Fitzsimmons	Wheatley Stable	5 F	0:56.00	$21,700
1955	Polly's Jet	2	Eddie Arcaro	Russell M. Downes	Barclay Stable	5 F	0:56.80	$14,725
1954	Nashua	2	Eddie Arcaro	James E. Fitzsimmons	Belair Stud	5 F	0:58.00	$12,150
1953	Catspaw	2	Eddie Arcaro	Sylvester Veitch	Cornelius Vanderbilt Whitney	5 F	0:57.20	$11,750
1952	Fort Salonga	2	Sam Boulmetis Sr.	E. W. King	Samuel P. Steckler	5 F	0:58.40	$13,075
1951	Primate	2	Ted Atkinson	James R. Hastie	Starmount Stable (Edward & Blanche Benjamin)	5 F	0:57.20	$11,550
1950	Liberty Rab	2	Patterson Milligan	Harris B. Brown	Lillian B. Christopher	5 F	0:57.20	$11,800
1949	Ferd	2	Basil James	Andy Schuttinger	Mary E. Schuttinger	5 F	0:57.80	$11,125
1948	Marabout	2	Hedley Woodhouse	Bert Mulholland	George D. Widener Jr.	5 F	0:59.20	$10,275
1947	My Request	2	Ronnie Nash	Jimmy Conway	Ben F. Whitaker	5 F	0:57.60	$12,100
1946	Eternal War	2	Eddie Arcaro	Frank Catrone	Allen T. Simmons	5 F	0:57.60	$11,215
1945	They Say	2	John Adams	Tom Smith	Maine Chance Farm	5 F	0:59.40	$4,860
1944	Flood Town	2	Warren Mehrtens	Max Hirsch	Edward J. Lasker	5 F	0:57.80	$9120
1943	Lucky Draw	2	Conn McCreary	Bert Mulholland	George D. Widener Jr.	5 F	0:59.00	$7,925
1942	Suncap	2	Don Meade	Richard E. Handlen	Foxcatcher Farm	5 F	0:59.20	$9,400
1941	Sun Again	2	Wendell Eads	Ben A. Jones	Calumet Farm	5 F	0:58.20	$8,175
1940	High Breeze	2	Basil James	Anthony Pelleteri	Millsdale Stable (Anthony Pelleteri & Melvin Emerich)	5 F	0:57.00	$5,975
1939	Cockerel	2	Eddie Arcaro	Hugh Dufford	Alvin Untermyer	5 F	0:57.80	$4,775
1938	Maeline	2	John Gilbert	George E. Phillips	Maemere Farm Stable (DeWitt Page)	5 F	0:57.60	$5,900
1937	Perpetuate	2	James Stout	George M. Odom	Robert L. Gerry Sr.	5 F	0:57.80	$6,665
1936	Scintillator	2	Harry Richards	Hugh Dufford	Alvin Untermyer	5 F	1:00.80	$6,500
1935	Maeriel	2	Eddie Litzenberger	George E. Phillips	Maemere Farm Stable (DeWitt Page)	5 F	0:58.20	$7,255
1934	Plat Eye	2	Silvio Coucci	William Brennan	Greentree Stable	5 F	0:59.00	$5,710
1933	Black Buddy	2	Silvio Coucci	William Brennan	Greentree Stable	5 F	0:59.80	$5,680
1932	Happy Gal	2	Earl Steffen	James E. Fitzsimmons	Belair Stud Stable	5 F	0:57.00	$12,800
1931	Irene's Bob	2	Linus McAtee	James W. Healy	James E. Gaffney	5 F	0:59.00	$14,500
1930	Equipoise	2	Raymond Workman	Fred Hopkins	Harry Payne Whitney	5 F	0:59.00	$15,400
1929	Black Majesty	2	Virgil Peterson	Bennet W. Creech	William Robertson Coe	5 F	0:59.80	$17,250
1928	Blue Larkspur	2	Edgar Barnes	Herbert J. Thompson	Edward R. Bradley	5 F	0:59.60	$17,750
1927	Dice	2	Danny McAuliffe	James E. Fitzsimmons	Wheatley Stable	5 F	1:01.00	$15,700
1926	Draconis	2	John Maiben	Henry McDaniel	Gifford A. Cochran	4.5 F	0:53.00	$16,150
1925	Galetian	2	Tommy McTaggart	A. Jack Joyner	George D. Widener Jr.	5 F	0:57.40	$14,250
1924	Arcady	2	Linus McAtee	James G. Rowe Sr.	Harry Payne Whitney	5 F	1:01.80	$11,000
1923	Peter King	2	Clarence Turner	Fred Taral	Riviera Stable (Victor Vivadou)	5 F	0:58.20	$13,250
1922	McKee	2	Laverne Fator	Frank M. Taylor	John E. Madden	5 F	0:57.60	$13,200
1921	Column	2	Clarence Kummer	Joe Notter	Morton L. Schwartz	5 F	0:57.80	$13,800
1920	Tryster	2	Eddie Ambrose	James G. Rowe Sr.	Harry Payne Whitney	5 F	0:58.60	$5,850
1919	Bonnie Mary	2	Lavelle Ensor	William Hogan	Phillip A. Clark	5 F	0:59.40	$5,850
1918	Elfin Queen	2	Andy Schuttinger	William H. Karrick	Oneck Stable	5 F	0:58.60	$7,100
1917	Lucullite	2	James Butwell	Sam Hildreth	August Belmont Jr.	5 F	0:59.00	$6,050
1916	Hourless	2	Everett Haynes	Sam Hildreth	August Belmont Jr.	5 F	0:59.20	$3,900
1915	Lena Misha	2	Merritt C. Buxton	Frank Toner	Beverwyck Stable (Frank J. Nolan)	5 F	0:59.00	$2,325
1914	Hauberk	2	Merritt C. Buxton	H. I. Marshall	James L. Holland	5 F	1:00.40	$3,020
1913	Punch Bowl	2	James Butwell	Edward W. Heffner	E. F. Cooney	5 F	0:59.60	$2,395
1912	No races held due to the Hart–Agnew Law.							
1911	No races held due to the Hart–Agnew Law.							
1910	Seth	2	Joe Notter	Thomas Welsh	Newcastle Stable	5 F	1:02.00	$2,400
1909	Waldo	2	Walter Miller	Raleigh Colston Jr.	Charles L. Harrison	5 F	0:59.00	$1,925
1908	Joe Madden	2	Guy Garner	John E. Madden	John E. Madden	5 F	1:01.00	$5,495
1907	Smoker	2	Herman Radtke	John E. Madden	Francis R. Hitchcock	5 F	1:04.40	$3,720
1906	De Mund	2	Jack Martin	John W. May	Paul J. Rainey	5 F	0:59.80	$3,780
1905	First Water	2	Frank O'Neill	Fred Burlew	Newton Bennington	5 F	0:59.40	$3,700
1904	Song and Wine	2	Arthur Redfern	Fred Burlew	Newton Bennington	5 F	0:57.75	$3,570
1903	Broomstick	2	George M. Odom	Peter Wimmer	Samuel S. Brown	5 F	0:59.00	$4,860
1902	Mizzen	2	John Bullman	John J. Hyland	August Belmont Jr.	5 F	1:00.50	$6,540
1901	Blue Girl	2	Tommy Burns	John E. Madden	William C. Whitney	5 F	0:59.00	$4.935
1900	Tommy Atkins	2	Henry Spencer	James G. Rowe Sr.	James R. & Foxhall P. Keene	5 F	0:59.75	$5,900
1899	Doublet	2	Henry Spencer	Frank E. Brown	James R. & Foxhall P. Keene	5 F	1:01.50	$5,410
1898	Glenheim	2	Willie Simms	John E. Madden	John E. Madden	5 F	1:01.75	$6,050
1897	Firearm	2	Samuel Doggett	John J. Hyland	August Belmont Jr.	5 F	1:00.00	$4,275
1896	Casseopia	2	Fred Littlefield	R. Wyndham Walden	Alfred H. & Dave H. Morris	5 F	1:00.00	$3,150
1895	Race not held							
1894	Prince of Monaco	2	Willie Simms	Robert Tucker	C. Fleischmann & Sons	5 F	1:00.50	$6,035
1893	Senella	2	Lilly	Robert Tucker	C. Fleischmann & Sons	5 F	1:02.00	$6,750
1892	Dr. Rice	2	William J. Fitzpatrick	John J. Hyland	David Gideon & John Daly	5 F	1:00.00	$5,510
1891	Osric	2	Fred Taral	John Campbell	Alfred F. Walcott & John S. Campbell	4 F	0:47.25	$8,260
1890	St. Charles	2	Anthony Hamilton	James G. Rowe Sr.	August Belmont Sr.	4 F	0:48.25	$2,875
1889	Druidess	2	Johnny Reagan	R. Wyndham Walden	John A. & Alfred H. Morris	4 F	0:49.25	$1,375
1888	French Park (DH)	2	William J. Fitzpatrick	Andrew Thompson	J. D. Morrissey	4 F	0:51.00	$1,375
1888	Fides (DH)	2	P. Godfrey	James G. Rowe Sr.	August Belmont Sr.	4 F	0:51.00	$1,375
1887	King Fish	2	Jim McLaughlin	Frank McCabe	Dwyer Brothers Stable	4 F	0:51.50	$2,425
1886	Tremont	2	Jim McLaughlin	Frank McCabe	Dwyer Brothers Stable	4 F	0:00.00	$2,400
1885	Portland	2	Jim McLaughlin	James G. Rowe Sr.	Dwyer Brothers Stable	4 F	0:50.00	$1,850
1884	Triton	2	Brennan	R. Wyndham Walden	George L. Lorillard	4 F	0:49.75	$1,650
1883	Reveller	2	L. Urall	R. Wyndham Walden	George L. Lorillard	4 F	0:50.00	$1,300
1882	Henlopen	2	J. Brophy		Charles Reed	4 F	0:50.00	$2,225
1881	Onondaga	2	Jim McLaughlin	James G. Rowe Sr.	Dwyer Brothers Stable	4 F	0:50.50	$1,800
1880	Spinaway	2	Lloyd Hughes	R. Wyndham Walden	George L. Lorillard	4 F	0:49.75	$2,200
1879	Sensation	2	Lloyd Hughes	R. Wyndham Walden	George L. Lorillard	4 F	0:50.00	$2,750
1878	Plevna	2	Sayers		Francis Morris	4 F	0:54.25	$2,700
1877	Perfection	2	William Barret	William Brown	Pierre Lorillard IV	4 F	0:51.00	$2,700
1876	Idalia	2	John Sparling	William Brown	Pierre Lorillard IV	4 F	0:49.50	$2,100
1875	Faithless	2	John Sparling	William Brown	Pierre Lorillard IV	4 F	0:50.00	$2,450
1874	Meco	2	N. Heywood	Thomas Puryear	Thomas Puryear	4 F	0:50.50	$2,650
