= Delaware Handicap (Saratoga) =

- Class: Discontinued handicap
- Location: Saratoga Race Course, Saratoga Springs, New York, United States
- Inaugurated: 1901
- Race type: Thoroughbred - Flat racing

Race information
- Distance: 1 mile (8 furlong)
- Surface: Dirt
- Track: left-handed
- Qualification: 3-year-olds and up

The Delaware Handicap was an American Thoroughbred horse race held between 1901 and 1937 at Saratoga Race Course in Saratoga Springs, New York. An event for horses of either sex age three and older, it was contested on dirt over a distance of one mile. While fillies accounted for just under a third of the winners, their victories were marked by a number of dominating performances.

== Historical notes ==
First run on August 17, 1901, the race was won by Frank Farrell's three-year-old colt, Blues. The distance for this inaugural event was set at a mile and one-sixteenth after which it would be permanently shortened to one mile.

The sole two-time winner of the Delaware Handicap was John Sanford's very good filly Molly Brant who won in 1904 and 1905. Owner John Sanford, in partnership with father Stephen Sanford, had won the 1902 edition and John would win it for a record fourth time in 1907.

The 1908 passage of the Hart–Agnew anti-betting legislation by the New York Legislature under Republican Governor Charles Evans Hughes led to a state-wide shutdown of racing in 1911 and 1912. A February 21, 1913 ruling by the New York Supreme Court, Appellate Division saw horse racing return in 1913.

Gifford Cochran's fleet filly Fairy Wand, ridden by future U.S. Racing Hall of Fame inductee Clarence Kummer, won the 1919 Delaware Handicap in a time of 1:36 1/5 which equaled the American record for the one-mile distance.

On August 13, 1937, William Ziegler Jr.'s Esposa easily captured the thirty-fifth and final running of the Delaware Handicap. Esposa would go on to earn recognition as that year's American Champion Older Female Horse featured by her win in November's Bowie Handicap, a mile and five-eighths endurance test in which she broke the Pimlico track record while beating the mighty Seabiscuit. Esposa would prove herself again in 1938 when she would repeat as the U.S. Champion.

== Records ==
Speed record:

- 1:36.20 @ 1 mile: Sun Briar (1918)
- 1:36.20 @ 1 mile: Fairy Wand (1919)

Most wins:

- 2 - Molly Brant (1904,1905)

Most wins by a jockey:

- 2 - Willie Knapp (1905,1918)
- 2 - Joe McCahey (1908, 1909)
- 2 - Clarence Kummer (1919, 1922)
- 2 - Willie Kelsay (1924, 1930)

Most wins by a trainer:

- 3 - Henry McDaniel (1918, 1930, 1931)
- 3 - Thomas J. Healey (1908, 1914, 1923)

Most wins by an owner:

- 4 - John Sanford (1902*, 1904, 1905, 1907)

== Winners ==
Year	Winner	Age	Jockey	Trainer	Owner	Dist. (Miles)	Time	Win $
1937	Esposa	5	Nick Wall	Mathew P. Brady	William Ziegler Jr.	1 m	1:37.80	$3,025
1936	Vicaress	4	Tommy Malley	James E. Fitzsimmons	Belair Stud Stable	1 m	1:38.20	$3,125
1935	Only One	6	Robert Merritt	Philip M. Walker	Polly Brooks Howe	1 m	1:38.00	$3,150
1934	Kievex	3	Wayne D. Wright	George E. Phillips	William Graham	1 m	1:39.60	$3,050
1933	Tambour	5	John Gilbert	Preston M. Burch	Preston M. Burch	1 m	1:38.40	$3,270
1932	Flagstone	4	Robert Leischman	William H. Brooks	Linton Farms Stable (George M. Seglin)	1 m	1:37.80	$3,600
1931	Mr. Sponge	4	Mack Garner	Henry McDaniel	Joseph E. Widener	1 m	1:36.60	$4,150
1930	Flying Heels	3	Willie Kelsay	Henry McDaniel	Gifford A. Cochran	1 m	1:38.60	$4,150
1929	Buddy Bauer	5	Eddie Legere	Herbert J. Thompson	Edward R. Bradley	1 m	1:37.00	$4,450
1928	Byrd	4	Anthony Pascuma	Alex Gordon	Fair Stable	1 m	1:42.00	$4,475
1927	Light Carbine	4	Fred Stevens	Michael J. Dunlevy	Ira B. Humphreys	1 m	1:40.60	$4,475
1926	Single Foot	4	Clarence Turner	Harry Rites	J. Edwin Griffith	1 m	1:40.00	$4,875
1925	Blind Play	4	John Maiben	Louis Feustel	Log Cabin Stable	1 m	1:38.80	$4,600
1924	Sunsini	4	Willie Kelsay	Frank M. Bray	Lilane Stable (Mrs. William L. Walker)	1 m	1:40.40	$5,025
1923	Wilderness	3	Benny Marinelli	Thomas J. Healey	Richard T.Wilson Jr.	1 m	1:41.00	$4,650
1922	Blazes	5	Clarence Kummer	William M. Garth	Joshua S. Cosden	1 m	1:43.40	$4,375
1921	Idle Dell	3	George W. Penman	Scott P. Harlan	Greentree Stable	1 m	1:38.20	$4,975
1920	Boniface	5	Earl Sande	H. Guy Bedwell	J. K. L. Ross	1 m	1:40.80	$3,800
1919	Fairy Wand	5	Clarence Kummer	James N. Evans	Gifford A. Cochran	1 m	1:36.20	$2,675
1918	Sun Briar	3	Willie Knapp	Henry McDaniel	Willis Sharpe Kilmer	1 m	1:36.20	$2,675
1917	Old Rosebud	6	George Molesworth	Frank D. Weir	Hamilton C. Applegate	1 m	1:38.40	$2,950
1916	Pennant	5	Joe Notter	James G. Rowe Sr.	Harry Payne Whitney	1 m	1:37.60	$1,950
1915	Star Jasmine	6	Jack Martin	Thomas Clay McDowell	Thomas Clay McDowell	1 m	1:43.40	$1,050
1914	Tartar	4	Walter Taylor	Thomas J. Healey	Montpelier Stable	1 m	1:37.60	$1,655
1913	Lahore	5	Charles Borel	Walter S. House	John O. Talbott	1 m	1:39.80	$2,285
1912	No races held due to the Hart–Agnew Law.							
1911	No races held due to the Hart–Agnew Law.							
1910	Sir John Johnson	5	Vincent Powers	Dave Woodford	Beverwyck Stable (Frank J. Nolan)	1 m	1:40.00	$2,845
1909	Field Mouse	3	Joe McCahey	A. Jack Joyner	August Belmont Jr.	1 m	1:42.40	$1,385
1908	Beaucoup	3	Joe McCahey	Thomas J. Healey	Montpelier Stable	1 m	1:40.20	$530
1907	Vails	3	Louis Beckman	William Hayward Jr.	John Sanford	1 m	1:38.00	$2,200
1906	Dandelion	4	LaVerne Sewell	John E. Madden	Francis R. Hitchcock	1 m	1:38.60	$1,835
1905	Molly Brant	5	Willie Knapp	Hubert H. Hyner	John Sanford	1 m	1:39.40	$2,200
1904	Molly Brant	4	Lucien Lyne	Hubert H. Hyner	John Sanford	1 m	1:39.60	$2,535
1903	Gimcrack	3	Willie Gannon	James G. Rowe Sr.	James R. Keene	1 m	1:46.40	$2,400
1902	Chuctanunda	4	George M. Odom	William Hayward Sr.	S. Sanford & Son *	1 m	1:38.00	$2,305
1901	Blues	3	Willie Shaw	Thomas Welsh	Frank J. Farrell	1-1/16 m	1:47.60	$1,910

- * "Son of Stephen is John Sanford
