= William M. Garth =

American racehorse owner (1863–1934)

William Garth
Personal information
- Born: September 12, 1863 United States
- Died: June 15, 1934 (aged 70) Charlottesville, Virginia, US
- Resting place: Garth Chapel Cemetery, Owensville, Virginia
- Occupations: Trainer, owner, breeder

Horse racing career
- Sport: Horse racing

Major racing wins
- Walden Stakes (1906); Fall Handicap (1907); Washington Nursery Stakes (1907); Tyro Stakes (1909); Minto Selling Stakes (1911); Pimlico Nursery Stakes (1913, 1921, 1923); Aberdeen Stakes (1919); Suburban Handicap (1920); Excelsior Handicap (1921); Spring Juvenile Stakes (1921); Youthful Stakes (1921); Delaware Handicap (1922); Hopeful Stakes (1922); Tremont Stakes (1922); United States Hotel Stakes (1922); Withers Stakes (1922); Gazelle Handicap (1923); Carlton Stakes (1923); Dwyer Stakes (1923, 1929); Knickerbocker Handicap (1923); Laurel Handicap (1923); Potomac Handicap (1923); Chesapeake Stakes (1924); Keene Memorial Stakes (1924); Astoria Stakes (1928); Victoria Stakes (1932) U.S. Triple Crown race wins: Kentucky Derby (1920)

Significant horses
- Dunlin, Paul Jones, Martingale

William M. Garth (September 12, 1863 - June 15, 1934) was an American trainer, owner, and breeder of Thoroughbred racehorses best known as the winning trainer of 1920 Kentucky Derby victor Paul Jones for owner Ral Parr. He also trained Martingale to a second-place finish behind Zev in the 1923 Kentucky Derby.

== Garth family background ==
William M. Garth was a descendant of the prosperous family of Thomas Garth, the first of the Garth family to settle in Albemarle County, Virginia in 1762. One of several in the family named William, he owned Ingleside Stock Farm which had its own training track and a 5,000 square-foot horse barn. The property was on Garth Road outside Charlottesville, Virginia which was named for his family. In 1923 he purchased 1911 Kentucky Derby winner Meridian to stand as a sire at his stud farm.

William Garth is buried in the Garth Chapel Cemetery on Garth Road in Owensville, Virginia.

His son, J. Woods Garth, followed in his father's footsteps and is best known as the trainer of Snob II, a multiple stakes winner who ran second to Pillory in the 1922 Belmont Stakes.
