= St. James Church (Charlottesville, Virginia) =

Historic church in Virginia, United States

- U.S. National Register of Historic Places
- Virginia Landmarks Register
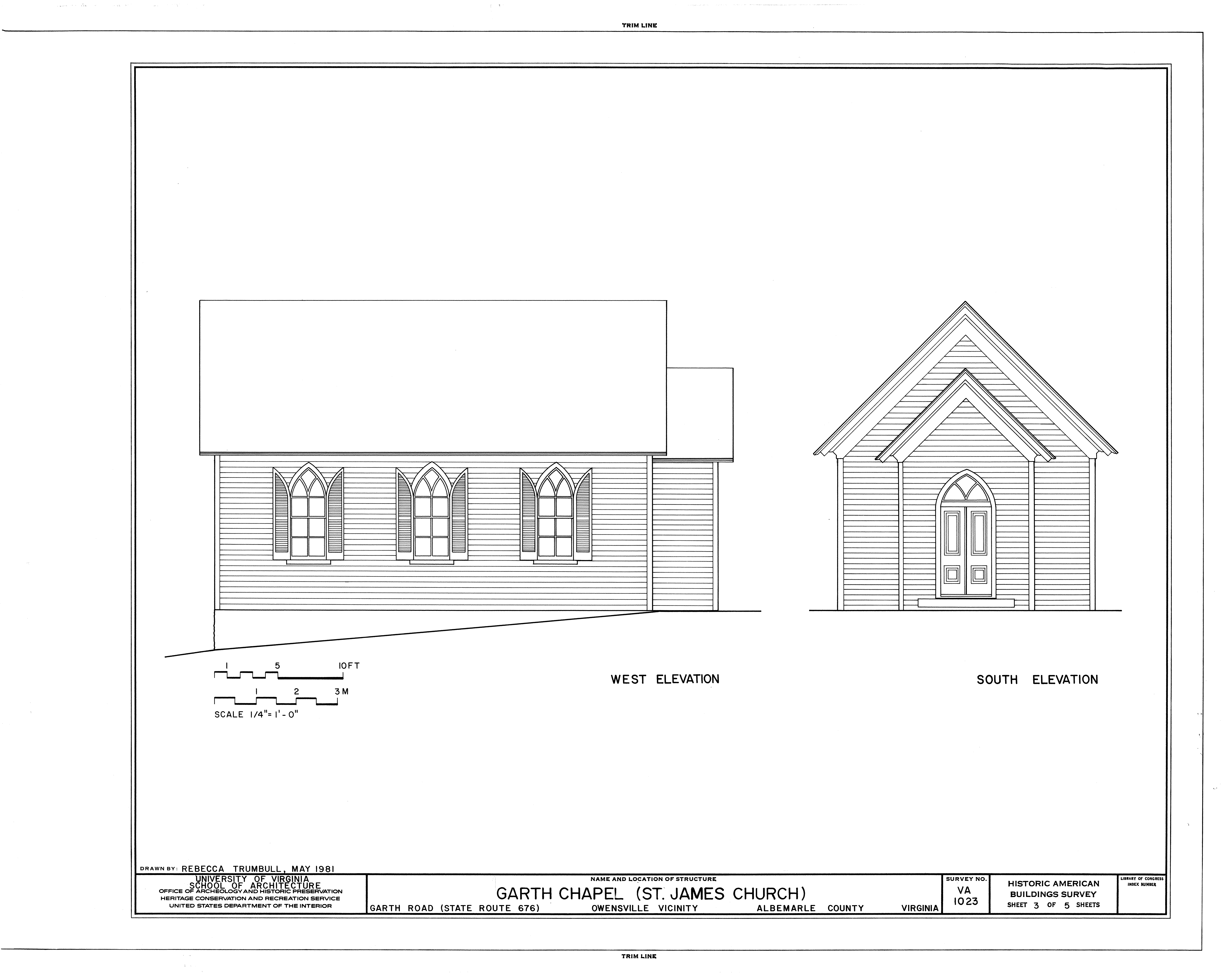
- Drawing of the front and side

- Location within Virginia Location within the United States
- Location: VA 614, Owensville, Virginia (Charlottesville vicinity)
- Coordinates: 38°06′08″N 78°34′22″W
- Area: 1 acre (0.40 ha)
- Built: 1896
- Architectural style: Vernacular Gothic Revival
- NRHP reference No.: 12001186
- VLR No.: 002-0582

Significant dates
- Added to NRHP: January 14, 2013
- Designated VLR: September 20, 2012

St. James Church (also known as Garth Chapel) is a historic church located northwest of Charlottesville near Owensville, Albemarle County, Virginia, United States on VA 614 east of VA 676. The vernacular Gothic Revival chapel was constructed in 1896 with the help of the Garth Family and the sponsorship of Christ Episcopal Church in Charlottesville. The church served a congregation of between 25–30 people at its construction. Regular worship services were held up until the 1940s, after which only graveside funeral services were held. Beginning in 1974 and continuing to the present day, christenings, weddings, and funerals were held in the church. Although there is no active congregation, St. James Church continues to be a consecrated Episcopal Church.

It was added to the National Register of Historic Places on January 14, 2013.

== See also ==
- Episcopal Diocese of Virginia
- National Register of Historic Places listings in Albemarle County, Virginia
