= Aberdeen Stakes =

20th-century American Thoroughbred horse race

- Class: Discontinued stakes
- Location: Havre de Grace Racetrack, Havre de Grace, Maryland, United States
- Inaugurated: 1913
- Race type: Thoroughbred - Flat racing

Race information
- Distance: 4.5 furlongs
- Surface: Dirt
- Track: Left-handed
- Qualification: Two-years-old

The Aberdeen Stakes was an American Thoroughbred horse race held annually from 1913 through 1947 at Havre de Grace Racetrack in Havre de Grace, Maryland. Open to two-year-olds of either sex, it was run on dirt over a distance of four-and-a-half furlongs.

At one time an important event for juveniles, 1915 winner George Smith and 1919 winner Paul Jones both went on to win the Kentucky Derby.

The Aberdeen Stakes was last run in 1947, a year in which Saggy won and set a new World Record for the four-and-a-half furlong distance on dirt around one turn.

== Records ==
- Time for 4.5 furlongs on dirt: 0:51.80, Saggy (1947) - New World Record

Most wins by a jockey:

- 2 - Willie Kelsay (1920, 1930)

Most wins by a trainer:

- 2 - John P. "Doc" Jones (1926, 1946)
- 2 - Clyde Phillips (1932, 1933)

Most wins by an owner:

- 2 - Harry P. Whitney (1917, 1922)
- 2 - William Ziegler Jr. (1932, 1933)

== Winners ==
Year	Winner	Jockey	Trainer	Owner	Dist. (F)	Time
1947	Saggy	Alan Gray	Leonard E. Ogle	Stanley Sagner	4.5 F	0:51.80
1946	Shaffie	Sammy Walters	John P. "Doc" Jones	Rock Hill Farm	4.5 F	0:53.60
1943	no race					
1944	Flying Bridge	Glen Smith	George Alexandra	Weston W. Adams	4.5 F	0:55.00
1943	no race					
1942	True North	Albert Schmidl	Preston M. Burch	W. Deering Howe	4.5 F	0:53.20
1941	Chiquita Mia	Leon Haas	Tom Smith	Charles S. Howard	4.5 F	0:54.00
1940	Becomly	Max Berg	H. Guy Bedwell	Hazel M. Babylon	4.5 F	0:54.60
1939	Imprudent	Irving Anderson	Joseph Serio Jr.	Ella K. Bryson	4.5 F	0:54.00
1938	Charlotte Girl	Johnny Longden	Phil Reuter	Elwood Sachsenmaier	4.5 F	0:53.60
1937	Benjam	Willie Saunders	R. Emmett Potts	Bomar Stable (Bohn & Markey)	4.5 F	0:53.60
1936	Goldey F.	Harry Richards	W. A. Bridges	Mrs. W. A. Bridges	4.5 F	0:54.00
1935	Wise Duke	Louis Schaefer	Sherrill W. Ward	Harry H. Hector	4.5 F	0:53.60
1934	Stainforth	James H. Burke	William Irvine	Sylvester W. Labrot	4.5 F	0:53.20
1933	Bonanza	Anthony Pascuma	Clyde Phillips	William Ziegler Jr.	4.5 F	0:53.00
1932	Cattail	Eddie Watters	Clyde Phillips	William Ziegler Jr.	4.5 F	0:55.00
1931	Fall Apple	Alfred M. Robertson	T. J. Healey	C. V. Whitney	4.5 F	0:54.20
1930	Vander Pool	Willie Kelsay	D. R. (Puddin) McDaniel	Tennessee Stable	4.5 F	0:53.00
1929	Good As Gold	Eddie Ambrose	Scott P. Harlan	Sarah F. Jeffords	4.5 F	0:54.00
1928	Click	Fritz Weiner	Max Hirsch	Eben M. Byers	4.5 F	0:55.40
1927	Rose Eternal	Ovila Bourassa	George Arvin	H. Teller Archibald	4.5 F	0:54.20
1926	Club Steak	Jimmy Chalmers	John P. "Doc" Jones	John P. "Doc" Jones	4.5 F	0:54.40
1925	Rock Man	John Maiben	Joseph H. Stotler	Margaret Emerson	4.5 F	0:53.00
1924	Single Foot	Edward Scobie	Harry Rites	J. Edwin Griffith	4.5 F	0:53.00
1923	June Flower	Andy Schuttinger	Roy Waldron	Xalapa Farm (Edward F. Simms)	4.5 F	0:54.60
1922	Woodland	Leslie Penman	Fred Hopkins	Harry P. Whitney	4.5 F	0:54.40
1921	St. Maurice	Everett C. Haynes	J. G. Wagnon	Pelican Stable	4.5 F	0:53.40
1920	Careful	Willie Kelsay	Eugene Wayland	Walter J. Salmon Sr.	4.5 F	0:54.40
1919	Paul Jones	Donald Mergler	William M. Garth	Ral Parr	4.5 F	0:55.60
1918	Ormonda	Clarence Kummer	Max Smart	Samuel Ross	4.5 F	0:55.40
1917	Tippity Witchet	Frank Robinson	James G. Rowe Sr.	Harry P. Whitney	4.5 F	0:54.60
1916	Nonesuch	Thomas Parrington	Kimball Patterson	J. E. McGrath	4.5 F	0:54.80
1915	George Smith	James Butwell	Thomas J. Shannon	Eddie Mcbride	4.5 F	0:53.80
1914	Jesse Jr.	Joe McCahey	L. Blume	J. W. Hendrick Jr.	4.5 F	0:55.00
1913	Enver Bey	Roscoe Troxler	Albert Simons	Lewis S. Thompson	4.5 F	0:55.00
