= Triplicate (horse) =

American Thoroughbred racehorse

- Sire: Reigh Count
- Grandsire: Sunreigh
- Dam: Fairday
- Damsire: Fair Play
- Sex: Stallion
- Foaled: 1941
- Country: United States
- Colour: Chestnut
- Owner: Fred Astaire
- Trainer: Clyde Phillips; Lloyd Campion (1947)
- Record: 90: 13-10-14
- Earnings: US$244,600

Major wins
- San Juan Capistrano Handicap (1946); Hollywood Gold Cup (1946); Golden Gate Handicap (1947); Palette Purse (1947); Regatta Handicap (1947)

Triplicate (foaled 1941) was an American Thoroughbred racehorse.

== Background ==
Triplicate was sired by the 1928 American Horse of the Year and U.S. Racing Hall of Fame inductee, Reigh Count. His dam was Fairday, a daughter of another Hall of Fame inductee, Fair Play.

== Racing career ==
Triplicate was purchased as an unsuccessful three-year-old for $6,000 by actor/dancer Fred Astaire who owned Blue Valley Ranch, a Thoroughbred breeding farm in the San Fernando Valley. Under veteran trainer Clyde Phillips, Triplicate had his best year in 1946 at age five. In March he defeated Howard Hawks' horse and won the 1 1/2-mile San Juan Capistrano Handicap in track record time and on July 27 beat the best horses on the West Coast in the $100,000 Hollywood Gold Cup.

Trainer Clyde Phillips died on December 17, 1946, and Triplicate's race conditioning was taken over by Lloyd Campion. In 1947, Triplicate's most important win came under superstar jockey Johnny Longden in the $75,000 Golden Gate Handicap at Golden Gate Fields. In his last year of racing at age seven in 1949, he met with only modest success.

== Sire line tree ==
- Triplicate
  - Better Bee
    - Abes Hope
    - Better Sea
    - Del Bee
      - Sugar Bee
    - Bee Bee Bee
