= Pimlico Nursery Stakes =

- Class: Discontinued stakes
- Location: Pimlico Race Course; Baltimore, Maryland
- Inaugurated: 1910-1947
- Race type: Thoroughbred, Flat racing

Race information
- Distance: 5 furlongs
- Track: Dirt, left-handed
- Qualification: Two-year-olds

The Pimlico Nursery Stakes was a race for Thoroughbred horses run at Pimlico Race Course from 1909 through 1947. Open to two-year-old horses of either sex, it was run on a dirt track.

Distances:

- 1909-1937, 1943, 1945: 4½ furlongs
- 1938-1942, 1944, 1946-1947: 5 furlongs

== Records ==
Speed record:

- Lady Gunner - 0:53.00 for 4½ furlongs in 1945
- Dockstader - 1:00.20 for 5 furlongs in 1944

Most wins by a jockey:

- 4 - Eddie Ambrose (1915, 1917, 1919, 1929)

Most wins by a trainer:

- 3 - William M. Garth (1913, 1921, 1923)
- 3 - Preston M. Burch (1928, 1932, 1936)

Most wins by an owner:

- 3 - Samuel Ross (1909,1916, 1930)
- 3 - Sarah F. Jeffords (1926, 1929, 1936)
- 3 - Ella K. Bryson (1940, 1941, 1947)

== Winners ==
Year	Winner	Age	Jockey	Trainer	Owner	Dist. (Furlongs)	Time	Win$
1947	Equibit	2	Nick Jemas	Frederick W. Case	Ella K. Bryson	5 F	1:01.40	$8,095
1946	Jet Pilot	2	Douglas Dodson	Tom Smith	Maine Chance Farm	5 F	1:02.20	$4,250
1945	Lady Gunner	2	John Breen	James McGee	Morris Wexler	4.5 F	0:53.00	$3,870
1944	Dockstader	2	Eddie Arcaro	John M. Gaver Sr.	Greentree Stable	5 F	1:00.20	$6,190
1943	Galactic	2	George Woolf	James E. Ryan	Esther D. du Pont Weir	4.5 F	0:54.80	$3,010
1942	Teentee	2	Albert Schmidl	Michael M. Harrison	J. L. Collins	5 F	1:00.80	$5,720
1941	Joe Ray	2	Conn McCreary	Joseph Serio Jr.	Ella K. Bryson	5 F	1:02.00	$5,150
1940	Nannykins	2	Albert Shelhamer	Joseph Serio Jr.	Ella K. Bryson	5 F	1:01.00	$5,530
1939	Cockerel	2	Hilton Dabson	Hugh Dufford	Alvin Untermyer	5 F	1:01.00	$4,820
1938	Charlotte Girl	2	Johnny Longden	Phil Reuter	Elwood Sachsenmaier	5 F	1:00.40	$4,810
1937	Rehearsal	2	Joe Wagner	John A. Boniface	Mrs. Robert H. Heighe	4.5 F	0:54.40	$2,500
1936	Golden Era	2	Harry Richards	Preston M. Burch	Sarah F. Jeffords	4.5 F	0:55.00	$2,830
1935	Grand Slam	2	Raymond Workman	R. Emmett Potts	BoMar Stable (Charles B. Bohn & Peter A. Markey)	4.5 F	0:56.60	$2,780
1934	Surveyor	2	Raymond Workman	Thomas J. Healey	C. V. Whitney	4.5 F	0:54.60	$3,770
1933	Wise Daughter	2	Buddy Hanford	Sherrill W. Ward	Everglade Stable	4.5 F	0:55.80	$3,770
1932	Garden Message	2	J. Smith	Preston M. Burch	Thomas H. Somerville	4.5 F	0:55.20	$6,340
1931	Election Day	2	Edward Watters	Thomas D. Rodrock	Katherine E. Hitt	4.5 F	0:54.40	$6,150
1930	Happy Scot	2	Jason Eaby	Matthew Smart	Samuel Ross	4.5 F	0:53.80	$5,920
1929	Good As Gold	2	Eddie Ambrose	Scott P. Harlan	Sarah F. Jeffords	4.5 F	0:55.40	$5,440
1928	Chicleight	2	Raymond Peternell	Preston M. Burch	Nevada Stock Farm (George Wingfield)	4.5 F	0:54.20	$5,950
1927	Rose Eternal	2	Pete Walls	George L. Arvin	H. Teller Archibald	4.5 F	0:55.00	$6,020
1926	Triton	2	Albert Johnson	Scott P. Harlan	Sarah F. Jeffords	4.5 F	0:54.40	$5,860
1925	Rock Man	2	Albert Johnson	Joseph H. Stotler	Sagamore Stable	4.5 F	0:54.00	$6,070
1924	Single Foot	2	Edward Scobie	Harry Rites	J. Edwin Griffith	4.5 F	0:54.00	$3,850
1923	Yankee Princess	2	Clarence Kummer	William M. Garth	Joshua S. Cosden	4.5 F	0:54.80	$1,950
1922	Frank G.	2	Clyde Ponce	James E. Fitzsimmons	Quincy Stable (James Francis Johnson)	4.5 F	0:53.80	$2,150
1921	Lord Baltimore	2	Ted Rice	William M. Garth	Joshua S. Cosden	4.5 F	0:56.00	$2,050
1920	Careful	2	Willie Kelsay	Eugene Wayland	Walter J. Salmon Sr.	4.5 F	0:56.00	$2,100
1919	Kinnoul	2	Eddie Ambrose	Michael J. Daly	Walter M. Jeffords Sr.	4.5 F	0:55.00	$1,225
1918	Blue Laddie	2	Frank Robinson	Albert Simons	Harry P. Whitney	4.5 F	0:54.80	$1,200
1917	Virginia Yell	2	Eddie Ambrose	Lewis W. Garth	John Porter Jones	4.5 F	0:57.00	$1,655
1916	Crank	2	Merritt Buxton	William H. Brooks	Samuel Ross	4.5 F	0:55.00	$1,440
1915	Tina-A-Ling	2	Eddie Ambrose	Edward Phelan	Quincy Stable (James Francis Johnson)	4.5 F	0:55.60	$1,210
1914	The Masquerader	2	James Butwell	Lewis W. Garth	Ral Parr	4.5 F	0:54.40	$1,600
1913	Executor	2	Clarence Turner	William M. Garth	Ral Parr	4.5 F	0:56.00	$1,685
1912	Rock View	2	John McTaggart	Louis Feustel	August Belmont Jr.	4.5 F	0:54.60	$1,610
1911	Overman	2	Eddie Dugan	John Whelan	August Belmont Jr.	4.5 F	0:55.40	$1,880
1910	Stinger	2	Charles Grand	Theodore F. Coles	C. C. Smithson	4.5 F	0:56.80	$2,070
1909	Tom Melton	2	Richard Scoville	Matthew Smart	Samuel Ross	4.5 F	0:56.20	$1,675
