= Golden Gate Fields Turf Stakes =

- Class: Discontinued
- Location: Golden Gate Fields; Albany, California, United States
- Inaugurated: 1947
- Race type: Thoroughbred - Flat racing
- Website: www.goldengatefields.com

Race information
- Distance: 1 3/8 miles (11 furlongs)
- Surface: Turf
- Track: left-handed
- Qualification: Four-year-olds & up
- Purse: $100,000

The Golden Gate Fields Turf Stakes was an American Thoroughbred horse race run annually at Golden Gate Fields in Albany, California. The race was open to horses four years old and up willing to race one and three-eighth miles on the turf and offered a purse of $250,000 at its last running.

First run on October 18, 1947 as the Golden Gate Handicap, the inaugural race was won by Triplicate owned by Fred Astaire and ridden by future U.S. Racing Hall of Fame inductee Johnny Longden.

Over the years it was given a number of different names:

- Golden Gate Fields Turf Stakes : 2008-2009
- Golden Gate Fields Breeders' Cup Stakes : 2007
- Golden Gate Fields Handicap : 2006
- Stanford Breeders' Cup Handicap : 2005 (at Bay Meadows)
- Golden Gate Breeders' Cup Handicap : 2001-2003
- Golden Gate Handicap : 1947 - 2000

The race has been run at a number of distances; 1 1/4 miles from 1947-1950, 1952, 1955 and 1959-1961. It was run at 1 1/8 miles in 1951, 1954, 1956-1958, 1965-1967, 1993, 1997, 2001-2004 and 2006.

== Records ==
Speed record:

- 1 3/8 miles - 2:13.00 - John Henry (1984)
- 1 1/8 miles - 1:46.28 - Adreamisborn (2005)

Most wins by a jockey:

- 4 - Russell Baze (1982, 2000, 2005 & 2009)

== Winners of the Golden Gate Fields Turf Stakes ==
Year	Winner	Age	Jockey	Trainer	Owner	Distance (Miles)	Time	Grade
2010	No Race	-	No Race	No Race	No race	no race	0:00.00	III
2009	Spring House	7	Russell Baze	Julio Canani		1 3/8	2:19.62	III
2008	Sudan	5	David Flores	Robert J. Frankel		1 3/8	2:16.86	III
2007	Fantastic Spain	7	Chad P. Schvaneveldt	Neil D. Drysdale		1 3/8	2:17.64	III
2006	Cosmonaut	4	Tony Farina	Patrick Biancone		1 1/8	1:48.75	III
2005	Adreamisborn	6	Russell Baze	Jerry Hollendorfer		1 1/8	1:46.28	III
