= Upset (horse) =

American-bred Thoroughbred racehorse

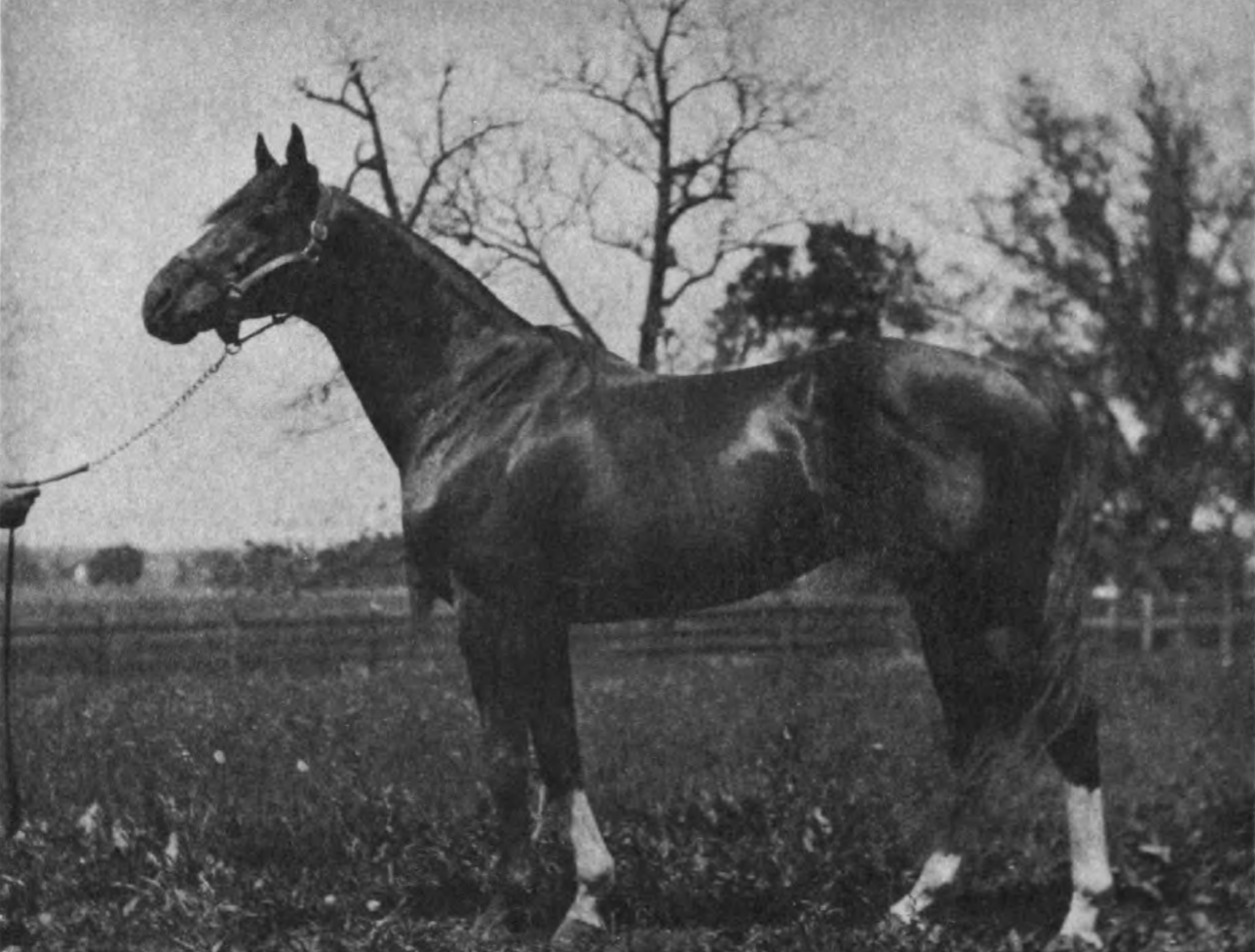
- Upset
- Sire: Whisk Broom
- Grandsire: Broomstick
- Dam: Pankhurst
- Damsire: Voter
- Sex: Colt
- Foaled: 1917
- Country: United States
- Color: Chestnut
- Breeder: Brookdale Stud Farm (Harry P. Whitney)
- Owner: Harry Payne Whitney
- Trainer: James G. Rowe Sr.
- Earnings: $37,504

Major wins
- Sanford Memorial Stakes (1919); Havre de Grace Consolation Handicap (1920); Latonia Derby (1920)

Upset (foaled 1917 in New Jersey) was an American Thoroughbred racehorse, notable as the only horse to have ever defeated Man o' War, who would go on to a career in which he won 20 of his 21 starts. Additionally, Upset finished in second place in both the 1920 Kentucky Derby and the 1920 Preakness Stakes.

Upset was owned by Harry Payne Whitney and trained by future Hall of Fame inductee James G. Rowe Sr..

== Two-year-old season ==
Upset's victory over Man o' War occurred early in their two-year-old season in the seventh running of the Sanford Memorial Stakes at Saratoga Race Course on August 13, 1919. Upset won the race by a neck. On this occasion, Man o' War had been fractious at the starting line and got a bad start, leaving close to last. He also carried 15 pounds more than Upset. The two horses would go on to race several more times in their careers, with Man o' War victorious on all other occasions.

Upset's victory in the Sanford Memorial was his only stakes win of his 1919 campaign. However, he did very well in other important events, running third in the Juvenile Stakes then had three runner-up finishes in the United States Hotel Stakes, Grand Union Hotel Stakes and the Champagne Stakes.

== Three-year-old season ==
As a three-year-old, the colt won the Havre de Grace Consolation Handicap for Whitney's assistant trainer Abner Clopton then for Rowe Sr. finished second by a head to Paul Jones in the mile and one-quarter Kentucky Derby. He then ran second to Man o' War in the Preakness Stakes, run at a mile and one-eighth. Competing in Kentucky with Clopton handling him, in mid-June Upset won the Latonia Derby over a distance of a mile and one-half.

== At stud ==
Upset sired a number of winners, the most noteworthy of which were Misstep (1925), who won numerous mid-level stakes and had career earnings of $182,815, and Windy City (1926), winner of the American Derby in 1929.

== Name ==
While it is widely believed that the term "upset", referring to a surprising loss, originated with this horse, that is not the case. The use of the word in horse racing dates to at least 1877, and the meaning "to overturn" or "overthrow" appears to be even older.
