= Vander Pool =

American-bred Thoroughbred racehorse

- Sire: Campfire
- Grandsire: Olambala
- Dam: Bramble Rose
- Damsire: Von Tromp
- Sex: Stallion
- Foaled: 1928
- Country: United States
- Color: Bay/Brown
- Breeder: Claiborne Farm
- Owner: 1) Tennessee Stable; 2) William A. Moore
- Trainer: Dave Robb McDaniel
- Record: 32: 19-3-6
- Earnings: US$$52,095

Major wins
- Aberdeen Stakes (1930); Bowie Kindergarten Stakes (1930); Miami Juvenile Stakes (1930); Whirl Stakes (1930); Mad Hatter Handicap (1930); Remsen Handicap (1930); Youthful Stakes (1930); St. James Purse (1931); Rialto Purse (1931); Greenfield Purse (1931); Arverne Handicap (1932); Interborough Handicap (1932)

Vander Pool (foaled 1928 in Kentucky) was an American Thoroughbred racehorse who won all eleven of his starts at age two in 1930 and won his first four races in 1931, tying the twenty-three-year-old North American record for most consecutive wins without a loss set by Colin in 1907/1908.

== Breeding and ownership ==
Bred by Claiborne Farm in Kentucky, Vander Pool was out of the California-bred mare Bramble Rose and was sired by the 1916 American Champion Two-Year-Old Colt, Campfire. Vander Pool was purchased as a yearling for $2,600 by Mrs. Agnes Allen at the 1929 Saratoga Sales. She raced him under the nom de course, Tennessee Stable.

== Undefeated at two ==
Trained by D. R. "Puddin" McDaniel, nephew of U.S. Racing Hall of Fame trainer Henry McDaniel, Vander Pool made his racing debut in January 1930 with a win in a condition race for two-year-olds at a Miami, Florida racetrack. Among his eleven wins in his undefeated 1930 campaign, in April Vander Pool won the Aberdeen Stakes at Havre de Grace Racetrack in which he beat Equipoise. Injured in July, he did not race again until October 15, when he got his tenth win without a loss in the Mad Hatter Handicap at Jamaica Race Course. Three days later, he closed out his racing year with a victory in the Remsen Handicap at the same Jamaica, New York, track.

Vander Pool spent the winter of 1930–31 at Charles Becker's farm in what was then the City of Baltimore, Maryland countryside. At the end of February 1931, he was sent to Pimlico Race Course to begin preparations for a spring campaign that culminated with the May 1 Preakness Stakes and the May 16 Kentucky Derby.

== Three-year-old campaign ==
The January 25, 1932, issue of the Fredericksburg, Virginia Free Lance-Star recounted that Vander Pool had been "rated by many as the Kentucky Derby favorite before suffering an injury in training." That injury kept him from competing in the U.S. Triple Crown races. His first start came on July 6, 1931, and Vander Pool earned his twelfth straight win in the St. James Purse at Aqueduct Racetrack in New York in which he defeated Flying Heels, a horse the New York Times called "one of the best sprinters in training." Vander Pool won again before capturing the Rialto Purse at Empire City Race Track for his fourteenth win. On the same racetrack on July 25, 1931, he won the Greenfield Purse, giving him fifteen straight races without a loss, which tied a twenty-three-year-old record set by Colin in 1907/08. In his sixteenth career race on November 26, 1931, Vander Pool suffered his first defeat in the six-furlong Aero Handicap at Bowie Racetrack.

In December 1931, Mrs. Agnes Allen sold Vander Pool to William A. Moore who raced him for the rest of his career, notably winning the 1932 Arverne and Interborough Handicaps. Following an unsuccessful career at stud, in 1938 William Moore sold Vander Pool to the United States Army Cavalry Remount Service.

== Pedigree ==
Pedigree of Vander Pool
Sire Campfire	Olambala	Ornus	Bend Or
Sire Campfire	Olambala	Ornus	Ashgrove
Sire Campfire	Olambala	Blue and White	Virgil
Sire Campfire	Olambala	Blue and White	Madam Dudley
Sire Campfire	Nightfall	Voter	Friar's Balsam
Sire Campfire	Nightfall	Voter	Mavourneen
Sire Campfire	Nightfall	Sundown	Springfield
Sire Campfire	Nightfall	Sundown	Sunshine
Dam Bramble Rose	Von Tromp	Ben Brush	Bramble
Dam Bramble Rose	Von Tromp	Ben Brush	Roseville
Dam Bramble Rose	Von Tromp	Cinderella	Hermit
Dam Bramble Rose	Von Tromp	Cinderella	Mazurka
Dam Bramble Rose	Rosegal	Galveston	Galopin
Dam Bramble Rose	Rosegal	Galveston	Hamptonia
Dam Bramble Rose	Rosegal	Rosormonde	Ormonde
Dam Bramble Rose	Rosegal	Rosormonde	Fairy Rose
