= Youthful Stakes =

- Class: Discontinued stakes
- Location: Belmont Park; Elmont, New York, USA
- Inaugurated: 1903–1982
- Race type: Thoroughbred – Flat racing

Race information
- Distance: 1⅛ miles (9 furlongs)
- Track: Dirt, left-handed
- Qualification: Two-year-olds

The Youthful Stakes was an American Thoroughbred horse race for two-year-old horses run between 1903 and 1982. It was raced on dirt at three different tracks in the New York City area beginning with the Jamaica and Aqueduct Racetracks, then in 1972 to Belmont Park where it remained until being canceled after the 1982 running. The inaugural edition in 1903 was won by Hazelwood with the race suspended until 1913.

The Youthful Stakes was established in an era when North American races like the Belmont Futurity Stakes, Tremont Stakes, Remsen Stakes, Arlington-Washington Futurity Stakes, Laurel Futurity Stakes, and Coronation Futurity Stakes for two-year-old horses were often the richest and most prestigious of the year. Among its most notable winners were U.S. Racing Hall of Fame inductees Man O' War, Native Dancer, and Affirmed.

In 1950, the Youthful Stakes was run in two divisions.

== Records ==
Speed record:

- 5 furlongs at Aqueduct Racetrack : 0:57.60, Golden Joey (1964)
- 5 ½ furlongs at Belmont Park: 1:03.00, Raise A Cup (1973)

Most wins by a jockey:

- 4 – Ted Atkinson (1944, 1945, 1948, 1956)
- 4 – Eric Guerin (1947, 1952, 1954, 1958)

Most wins by a trainer:

- 3 – James G. Rowe Sr. (1916, 1920, 1924)
- 3 – Sam Hildreth (1917, 1923, 1927)
- 3 – James W. Healy (1936, 1937, 1945)
- 3 – Winbert F. Mulholland (1942, 1943, 1950)

Most wins by an owner:

- 4 – George D. Widener Jr. (1928, 1942, 1943, 1950)

== Winners ==
Year	Winner	Jockey	Trainer	Owner	Dist. (Miles)	Time
1982	Flying Pocket	David Clark	Tony Mattine	Three Of Us Stable	5.5 F	1:04.40
1981	Deputy Minister	Lloyd Duffy	Bill Marko	Morton Levy	5.5 F	1:04.80
1980	Proud Appeal	Jeffrey Fell	Stanley M. Hough	Malcolm H. Winfield et al.	5.5 F	1:05.00
1979	Blues Alley	Craig Perret	Douglas Dodson	V. N. Green	5.5 F	1:05.20
1978	Coup de Kas	Steve Cauthen	Del W. Carroll	William S. Farish III	5.5 F	1:03.60
1977	Affirmed	Steve Cauthen	Laz Barrera	Harbor View Farm	5.5 F	1:05.00
1976	Medieval Man	Ángel Cordero Jr.	Thomas J. Kelly	Live Oak Plantation	5.5 F	1:04.00
1975	Turn To Turia	Eddie Maple	Reggie Cornell	Calumet Farm	5.5 F	1:04.40
1974	High Steel	Chuck Baltazar	LeRoy Jolley	William P. Minnotte	5.5 F	1:03.20
1973	Raise A Cup	Chuck Baltazar	Reggie Cornell	Calumet Farm	5.5 F	1:03.00
1972	Linda's Chief	Braulio Baeza	Alfred Scotti	Neil Hellman	5.5 F	1:05.20
1971	Rest Your Case	Chuck Baltazar	MacKenzie Miller	Cragwood Stables	5 F	0:59.20
1970	Cool Moon	Jorge Velásquez	Casey Hayes	Buckland Farm	5 F	0:58.80
1969	Insubordination	Mike Miceli	William J. Resseguet Jr.	Gerald Robins	5 F	0:58.20
1968	Night Invader	Eddie Belmonte	Joseph H. Pierce Jr.	Sheila Pierce	5 F	0:59.40
1967	Kaskaskia	Braulio Baeza	Del W. Carroll	William S. Farish III	5 F	0:58.60
1966	Tumiga	Ben Feliciano	Lucien Laurin	Frank Holbrook	5 F	0:59.00
1965	Timely Move	Braulio Baeza	Eugene Jacobs	Herbert A. Allen Sr.	5 F	0:59.20
1964	Golden Joey	Robert Ussery	Buddy Jacobson	Marion R. Frankel	5 F	0:57.60
1963	Dark King	Larry Adams	Harris B. Brown	Mrs. Harris B. Massey	5 F	0:58.00
1962	Be Somebody	John L. Rotz	Thomas J. Kelly	David P. Reynolds	5 F	0:59.40
1961	Su Ka Wa	John L. Rotz	Morris Lacy	Walnut Hill Farms	5 F	0:58.40
1960	Hail To Reason	Robert Ussery	Hirsch Jacobs	Patrice Jacobs	5 F	0:58.60
1959	Race not held					
1958	Royal Anthem	Eric Guerin	Lucien Laurin	Reginald N. Webster	5 F	0:59.60
1957	Bolero U	John Choquette	William R. Mitchell	John L. McKnight	5 F	1:00.20
1956	Bold Ruler	Ted Atkinson	James E. Fitzsimmons	Wheatley Stable	5 F	0:59.80
1955	Smooth Stride	Douglas Dodson	Merritt A. Buxton	Trio Stables	5 F	1:00.20
1954	Summer Tan	Eric Guerin	Sherril W. Ward	Dorothy Firestone Galbreath	5 F	0:59.40
1953	Revolt	Ben Green	Frank Barnett	Hal Price Headley	5 F	0:59.80
1952	Native Dancer	Eric Guerin	William C. Winfrey	Alfred G. Vanderbilt II	5 F	0:59.40
1951	Primate	Eddie Arcaro	James R. Hastie	Starmount Stable	5 F	0:59.00
1950-1	Iswas *	John Gilbert	D. W. Kerns	Brookfield Farms	5 F	1:00.80
1950-2	Battlefield	Eddie Arcaro	Winbert F. Mulholland	George D. Widener Jr.	5 F	0:59.80
1949	Ferd	Basil James	Andy Schuttinger	Mrs. Andy Schuttinger	5 F	0:57.80
1948	Eternal World	Ted Atkinson	Frank Catrone	Allen T. Simmons	5 F	1:00.40
1947	Nearway	Eric Guerin	Tommy Heard	Claude C. Tanner	5 F	0:59.80
1946	Eternal War	Basil James	Frank Catrone	Allen T. Simmons	5 F	0:59.60
1945	Twenty-Six	Ted Atkinson	James W. Healy	Vera S. Bragg	5 F	1:00.60
1944	Jeep	Ted Atkinson	Andy Schuttinger	C. V. Whitney	5 F	0:59.80
1943	Lucky Draw	Walter Mann	Winbert F. Mulholland	George D. Widener Jr.	5 F	1:00.60
1942	Red Sonnet	Jack Breen	Winbert F. Mulholland	George D. Widener Jr.	5 F	0:59.40
1941	Requested	Alfred Robertson	J. H. "Blackie" McCoole	Ben F. Whitaker	5 F	0:59.80
1940	Zacharias	Basil James	Patrick F. Dwyer	Millsdale Stable	5 F	0:59.20
1939	Gannet	Ronnie Nash	Jack Howard	Ben F. Whitaker	5 F	0:59.40
1938	El Chico	Nick Wall	Matthew P. Brady	William Ziegler Jr.	5 F	1:00.00
1937	Inhale	John Gilbert	James W. Healy	John Hay Whitney	5 F	0:59.00
1936	Court Scandal	John Gilbert	James W. Healy	John Hay Whitney	5 F	1:01.60
1935	White Cockade	George Ellis	James E. Fitzsimmons	Ogden Phipps	5 F	0:59.40
1934	Angelic	Anthony Tipton	Hirsch Jacobs	Mrs. Damon Runyon	5 F	0:59.40
1933	Billy M	Laverne Fator	Ernest Sietas	Samuel R. Rosoff	5 F	0:59.60
1932	Disdainful	Alfred Robertson	Fred Hopkins	C. V. Whitney	5 F	1:00.00
1931	Universe	Willie Kelsay	Joseph Bauer	Thomas M. Cassidy	5 F	0:59.60
1930	Vander Pool	Willie Kelsay	D. R. "Puddin" McDaniel	Mrs. Agnes Allen	5 F	1:01.80
1929	Sarazen	Willie Garner	Max Hirsch	Virginia Fair Vanderbilt	5 F	0:59.60
1928	Kopeck	Frank Moon	A. Jack Joyner	George D. Widener Jr.	5 F	1:01.00
1927	Ariel	Laverne Fator	Sam Hildreth	Rancocas Stable	5 F	0:59.00
1926	Thrace	George Ellis	Clyde Phillips	Greentree Stable	5 F	1:00.40
1925	Chance Play	Clarence Kummer	Louis Feustel	Log Cabin Stable	5.5 F	1:05.20
1924	Elf	James H. Burke	James G. Rowe Sr.	Harry Payne Whitney	5.5 F	1:05.60
1923	Tester	Mark Fator	Sam Hildreth	Rancocas Stable	5.5 F	1:06.00
1922	Bud Lerner	Earl Sande	Frank M. Taylor	John E. Madden	5.5 F	1:06.20
1921	Lord Baltimore	Ted Rice	William M. Garth	Joshua S. Cosden	5.5 F	1:07.20
1920	Tryster	Eddie Ambrose	James G. Rowe Sr.	Harry Payne Whitney	5.5 F	1:07.20
1919	Man O' War	Johnny Loftus	Louis Feustel	Glen Riddle Farm	5.5 F	1:06.60
1918	Lord Brighton	Lawrence Lyke	George M. Odom	Brighton Stable	5.5 F	1:06.20
1917	Lucullite	James Butwell	Sam Hildreth	August Belmont Jr.	5.5 F	1:06.80
1916	Tumbler	Thomas McTaggart	James G. Rowe Sr.	Harry Payne Whitney	5.5 F	1:07.60
1915	Paddy Whack	George Byrne	Richard C. Benson	James Butler	5.5 F	1:07.00
1914	Race not held					
1913	Gainer	John Wilson	H. I. Marshall	James L. Holland	6 F	1:13.60
1904	– 1912	Race not held				
1903	Hazelwood	John Bullman	William L. Oliver	William L. Oliver	6 F	1:14.00

* 1930 - Equipose won by was disqualified for twice impeding runner-up Vander Pool.
* 1950 - 1st division - Bank Account finished first but was disqualified to last.
