= Ted Rice =

American jockey

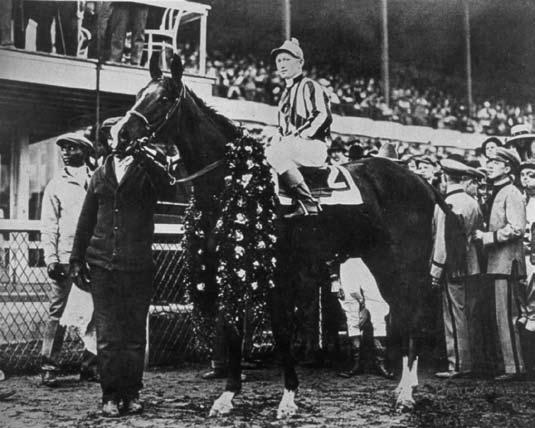
- Ted Rice at the 1920 Kentucky Derby

Personal information
- Died: October 6, 1923 Jamaica, Queens, New York
- Occupation: Jockey

Horse racing career
- Sport: Horse racing

Major racing wins
- Latonia Derby (1909, 1911); Louisville Handicap (1911); Blue Bonnets Breeders Stakes (1916); Durham Cup Stakes (1916); Ontario Jockey Club Cup (1916); Windsor Hotel Cup Handicap (1917); Bouquet Selling Stakes (1919); Nursery Handicap (1919); Paumonok Handicap (1920); Whirl Stakes (1920); Excelsior Handicap (1921); Susquehanna Handicap (1921); Maryland Handicap (1921); Pimlico Nursery Stakes (1921); Spring Juvenile Stakes (1921); Youthful Stakes (1921) Canadian Classic Race wins: Breeders' Stakes (1915); American Classic Race wins: Kentucky Derby (1920)

Significant horses
- Paul Jones, Lord Baltimore, Hermis

Ted R. Rice was an American jockey. He rode the winning horse Paul Jones in the 1920 Kentucky Derby. Rice received a $5,000 bonus from owner Capt. Ral Parr for winning the race.

Ted Rice died after a fall from a horse on October 6, 1923. To add to the tragedy, his mother was in the stands.
