= Clyde Phillips (horse trainer) =

American horse trainer

Personal information
- Born: July 3, 1891 Oklahoma
- Died: December 15, 1946 (aged 55) San Fernando, California
- Occupation: Trainer

Horse racing career
- Sport: Horse racing

Major racing wins
- Potomac Handicap (1916, 1930); Woodstock Stakes (1923); Albany Handicap (1925); Aqueduct Handicap (1925); Great American Stakes (1925, 1932); Kings County Handicap (1925); Momus Handicap (1925); Philadelphia Handicap (1925); Bouquet Stakes (1926); Hiawatha Handicap (1926); New Orleans Handicap (1926); Southampton Handicap (1926); Youthful Stakes (1926); Nursery Handicap (1927); Remsen Stakes (1927); Havre de Grace Handicap (1930); Latonia Championship Stakes (1930); Aberdeen Stakes (1932, 1933); Fashion Stakes (1932); San Pasqual Handicap (1935); Santa Catalina Handicap (1935); Del Mar Handicap (1940); Hollywood Derby (1940); San Gabriel Handicap (1945); Hollywood Gold Cup (1946)

Significant horses
- Triplicate, Spinach

Clyde Stonewall Phillips (July 3, 1891 - December 15, 1946) was an American Thoroughbred racehorse trainer and owner who trained for some of the top owners in the sport including Helen Hay Whitney and her daughter Joan Whitney Payson, the actor/dancer Fred Astaire, William Ziegler Jr. and William R. Coe.

Clyde Phillips got the most important win of his career in 1946 when Fred Astaire's horse Triplicate won the Hollywood Gold Cup.
