= Owensville, Virginia =

Unincorporated community in Virginia, United States

Owensville
- Unincorporated community
- Location within the Commonwealth of Virginia Owensville (the United States)
- Coordinates: 38°06′04″N 78°34′30″W
- Country: United States
- State: Virginia
- County: Albemarle
- Time zone: UTC−5 (Eastern (EST))
  - Summer (DST): UTC−4 (EDT)
- GNIS feature ID: 1477601

Owensville is an unincorporated community in Albemarle County, Virginia, United States.

St. James Church is listed on the National Register of Historic Places.
