= Paul Jones (horse) =

American-bred Thoroughbred racehorse

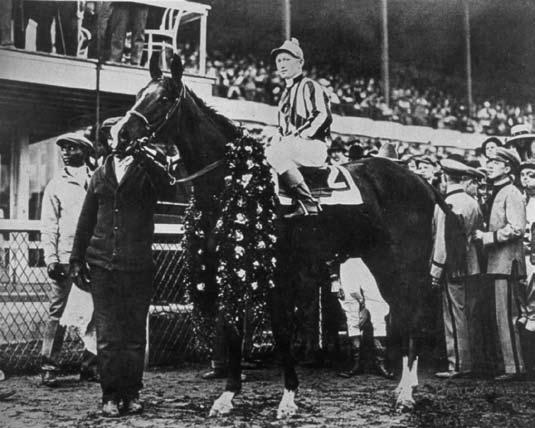
- Paul Jones after winning the 1920 Kentucky Derby
- Sire: Sea King
- Grandsire: Persimmon
- Dam: May Florence
- Damsire: Hamburg
- Sex: Gelding
- Foaled: 1917
- Country: United States
- Colour: Brown
- Breeder: John E. Madden
- Owner: 1) Ral Parr and Joshua S. Cosden (1920); 2) William M. Garth (1922); 3) Dr. John Paul Jones (1926)
- Trainer: William M. Garth
- Record: 65: 14-12-13
- Earnings: $64,171

Major wins
- Aberdeen Stakes (1919); Bouquet Selling Stakes (1919); Endurance Handicap (1919); Newark Handicap (1920); Suburban Handicap (1920); Susquehanna Handicap (1921); Triple Crown Race wins: Kentucky Derby (1920)

Paul Jones (1917–1930) was an American Thoroughbred racehorse that was the sixth gelding to win the Kentucky Derby. Paul Jones was foaled in the same year as Man o' War, winner of the 1920 Preakness and Belmont Stakes and one of the most influential sires of the 20th century. Man o' War was not entered in the 1920 Kentucky Derby because it was thought that a race so early in the season would be too taxing for him. Upset, the only horse ever to defeat Man o' War, did make it to the Derby.

== Background ==
Paul Jones was foaled in Lexington, Kentucky at Hamburg Place, the stud farm of John E. Madden. He was sired by the imported British stallion, Sea King, and was out of the Hamburg bred mare, May Florence. He was named after famous Admiral John Paul Jones and a popular brand of whiskey at the time.

== Racing career ==
The 1920 Kentucky Derby was run on an overcast day on a slow track with a field of seventeen horses. Ridden by Ted Rice, he won the race by a nose after staving off Upset, who showed impressive speed on the home stretch, and On Watch, who was a close third.

Paul Jones proved his Derby win was not a fluke by winning the 1920 Suburban Handicap. Paul Jones raced for a total of five years and, being a gelding with no career at stud, was given to his trainer, William Garth, for use as an exercise pony. Garth spoke favorably of his former charge, complimenting the gelding's gentle disposition and work ethic. Paul Jones did race in a few pony races at the Pimlico Race Course and was entered in a number of steeplechase races in the late 1920s under the name of Garth's son-in-law, Dr. John Paul Jones. Dr. Jones also trained Paul Jones as a hunter and rode him in fox hunts.

== Retirement ==
In 1929, Paul Jones was pensioned by Garth to live the remainder of his life at the Inglecress Farm near Charlottesville, Virginia, also the final home of 1911 Kentucky Derby winner Meridian.

Paul Jones was euthanized in April 1930 due to physical infirmities and was buried at Dr. John Paul Jones's Inglecress Farm near Charlottesville, Virginia.
