= Eddie Ambrose =

American jockey

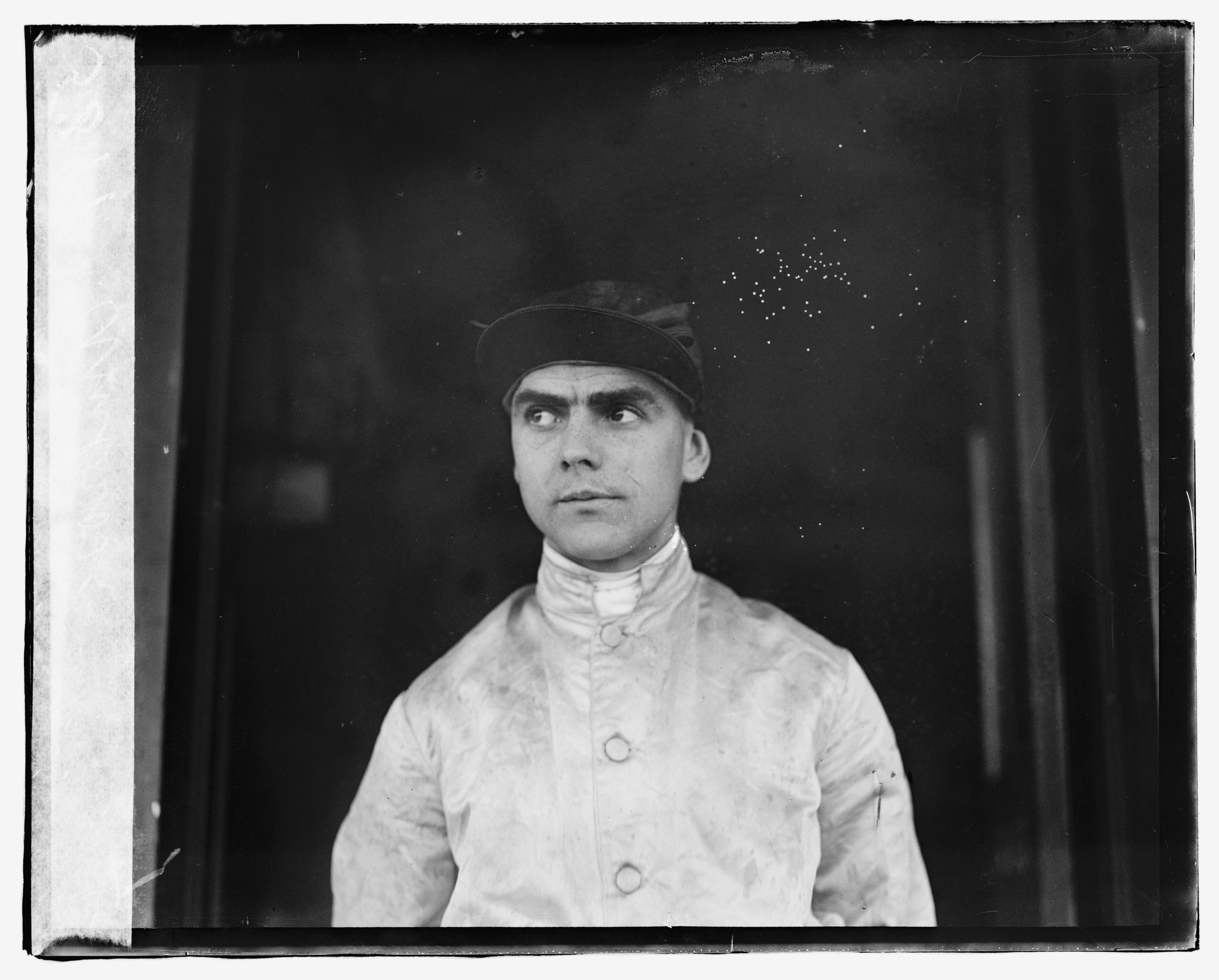

Personal information
- Full name: Edward Elbert Ambrose
- Born: April 13, 1894 St. Louis, Missouri, United States
- Died: June 8, 1994 (aged 100) Towson, Maryland, United States
- Resting place: Stenger Hill Cemetery, Fort Loudon, Pennsylvania

Horse racing career
- Sport: Horse racing
- Career wins: Not found

Major racing wins
- Havre de Grace Cup Handicap (1913, 1914); Hamilton Derby (1914); Pimlico Nursery Stakes (1915, 1917, 1919, 1929); Toronto Cup Stakes (1915); Walden Stakes (1916); Paumonok Handicap (1917); Adirondack Stakes (1918, 1920); Alabama Stakes (1919); Bowie Handicap (1919); Saratoga Special Stakes (1919); Astoria Stakes (1920, 1927); Edgemere Handicap (1920); Empire City Derby (1920); Fashion Stakes (1920); Grand Union Hotel Stakes (1920); Juvenile Stakes (1920); Keene Memorial Stakes (1920); Metropolitan Handicap (1920); Spinaway Stakes (1920); Toboggan Handicap (1920); Youthful Stakes (1920); Schuylerville Stakes (1926); East View Stakes (1927); Potomac Handicap (1927); American Derby (1928); Clark Handicap (1928); Latonia Derby (1928); Aberdeen Stakes (1929); Suburban Handicap (1929); Whitney Handicap (1929); Remsen Stakes (1931)

Significant horses
- Prudery, Toro, Wildair
- Updated on July 27, 2008

Edward Elbert Ambrose (April 13, 1894 – June 8, 1994) was an American jockey in Thoroughbred horse racing. In the 1910s and 1920s he rode for top owners such as Harry Payne Whitney, Willis Sharpe Kilmer, and Walter M. Jeffords.

During his career Ambrose had four mounts in the Kentucky Derby and seven in the Preakness Stakes with his best result in both aboard Toro when he finished third in the 1928 Derby and second in the 1928 Preakness for owner Edward B. McLean, publisher of The Washington Post. Among his best mounts was Wildair with whom he won the 1920 Metropolitan Handicap and ran third in the 1920 Preakness and Prudery, considered in retrospect as the American Champion Two and Three-Year-Old, Filly.

In a famous 1920 edition of the Dwyer Stakes involving just two entrants, Ambrose rode John P. Grier to a strong second-place finish against Man o' War.

Ambrose lived to be 100. He was a resident of Towson, Maryland at the time of his death in 1994.
