= George W. Loft =

American politician (1865–1943)

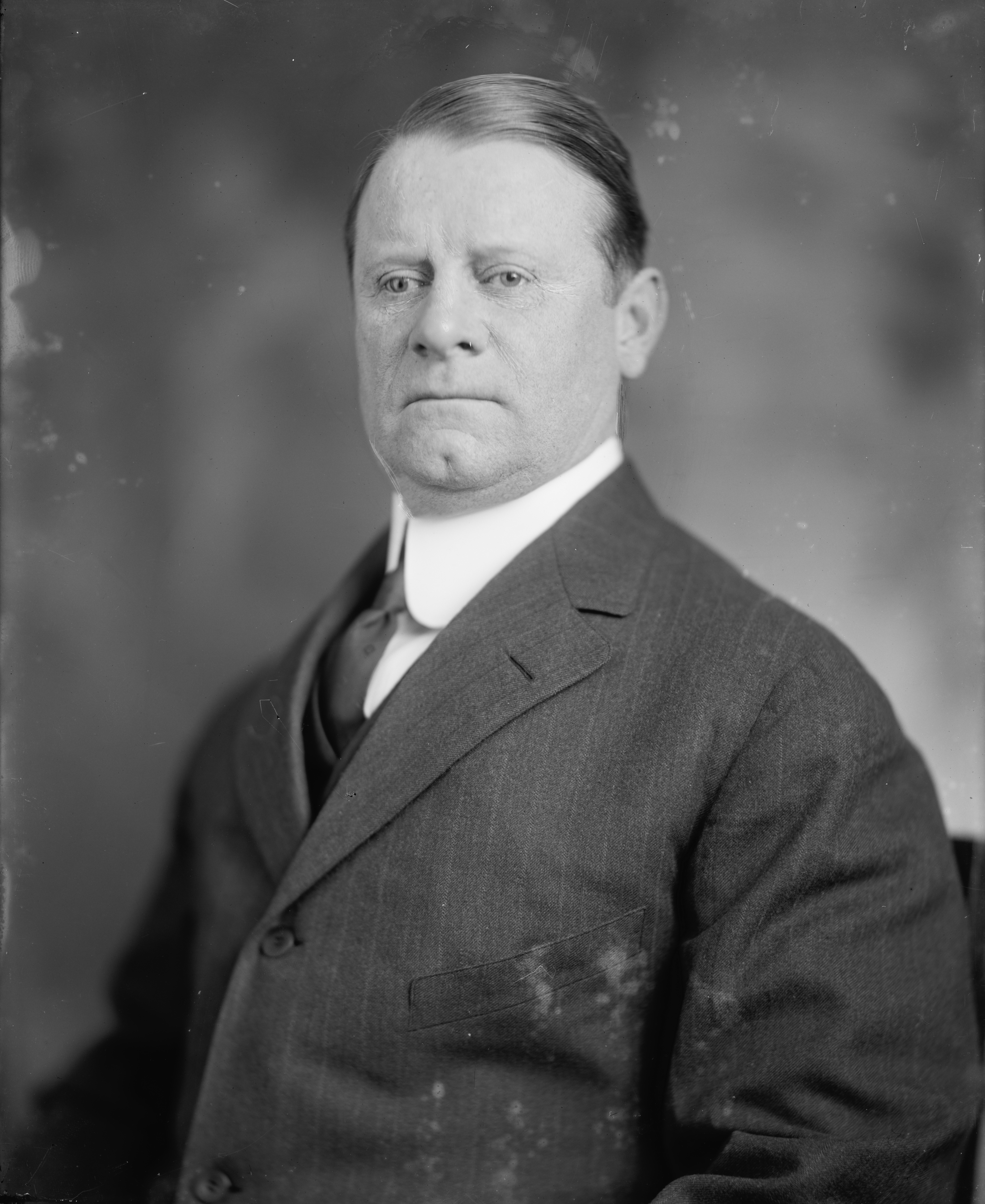

Member of the U.S. House of Representatives from New York's 13th district
- In office November 4, 1913 – March 3, 1917
- Preceded by: Timothy Sullivan
- Succeeded by: Christopher D. Sullivan

Personal details
- Born: George William Loft; February 6, 1865 New York City, New York, U.S.
- Died: November 6, 1943 (aged 78) Baldwin, New York, U.S.
- Resting place: Saint Raymond's Cemetery
- Party: Democratic
- Spouses: Elizabeth Marie Lyons (died 1910) Julia McMahon (m. 1911)
- Children: George Leon Loft (1895-1935)
- Occupation: Businessman; banker; real estate developer; racehorse breeder

George William Loft (February 6, 1865 – November 6, 1943) was an American businessman, politician, real estate developer, and owner/breeder of thoroughbred racehorses.

== Biography ==
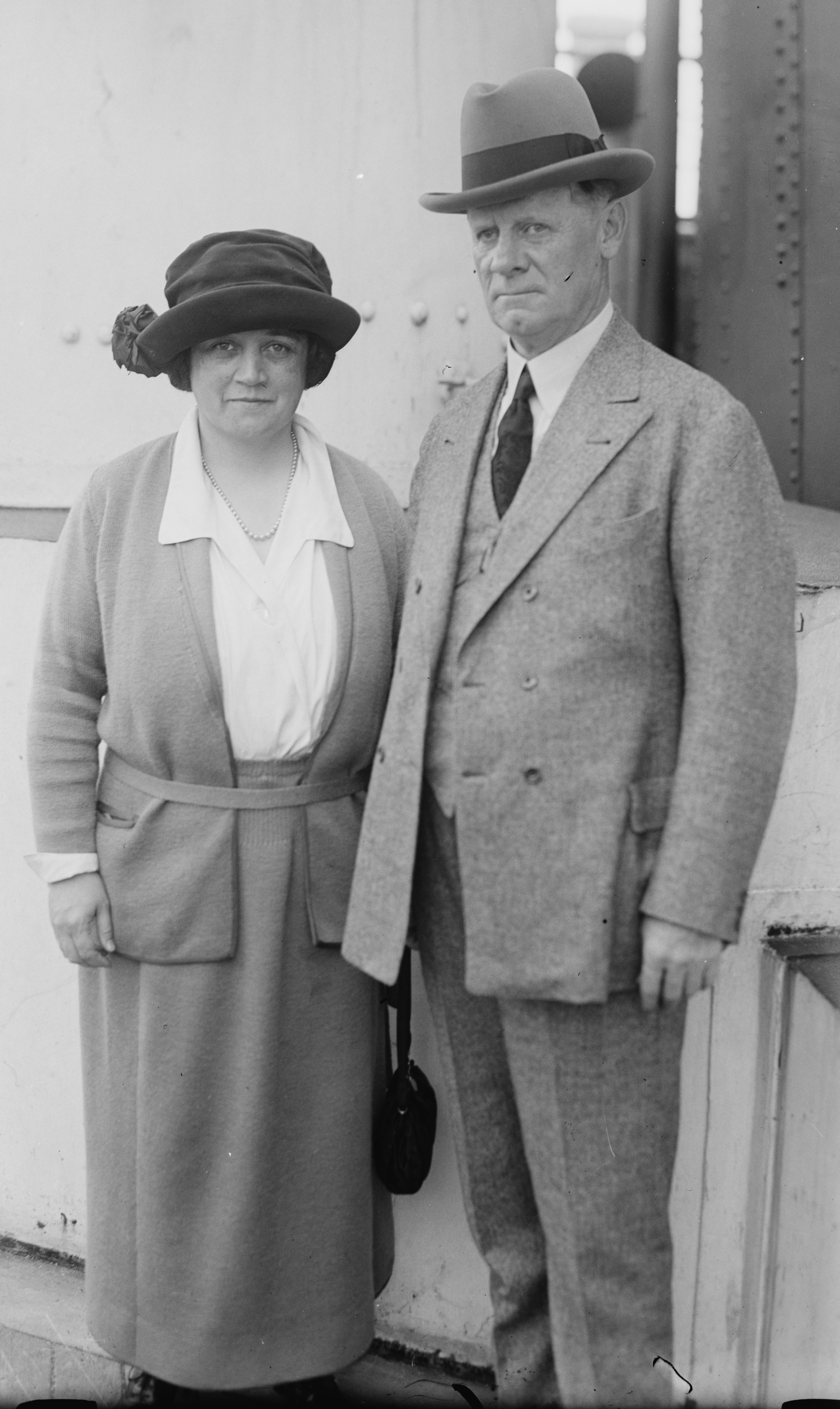
Loft with his wife Julia c. 1922

He was born in New York City on February 6, 1865, to English immigrant William Loft (1828–1919), 1860 founder of Loft, Inc. candymakers. Loft attended public schools. He gained considerable wealth in the candy manufacturing business and expanded into retailing, banking, and real estate.

=== Family ===
His first wife Elizabeth Marie Loft (nee Lyons), who was born in 1871, died in 1910. Loft remarried in 1911 to Julia McMahon (1883-1962) whom he met when she was a salesclerk working at his store at 54 Barclay Street in New York. The couple made their home in Baldwin, New York, on Long Island. On May 12, 1921, Julia Loft was appointed an honorary Deputy Police Commissioner for the City of New York and announced she would be active in her position and would fulfill her duties on a full-time basis.

=== Congress ===
A member of the United States House of Representatives from New York, Loft was elected as a Democrat to the Sixty-third Congress to fill the vacancy caused by the 1906 death of Timothy D. Sullivan. He was reelected in 1914 to the Sixty-fourth Congress and served from November 4, 1913, to March 3, 1917. He was not a candidate for renomination in 1916.

=== Later life ===
In 1923, the City of New York honored him by naming one of its Staten Island Ferry boats the George W. Loft.

He formed George W. Loft Markets Inc. as a retail store operator and George W. Loft Realty Company to handle all real estate transactions, primarily for leasing retail space. In 1938 Loft sub-divided forty acres of his estate at Baldwin, Long Island, erecting twelve luxury homes.

In 1927 George Loft founded the Emerald National Bank & Trust Co. in a building he owned at Seventh Avenue and 33rd Street in Manhattan. In 1929 he founded the South Shore Trust Co. in Rockville Centre, New York, and served as president until his death. Following his death, Frank W. Breitbach was elected to succeed George W. Loft as president of the South Shore Trust Company.

== Thoroughbred racing ==
Beginning around 1915, Loft became involved in the sport of Thoroughbred horse racing. His stable of horses in flat racing were trained by future U.S. racing Hall of Fame trainer, Max Hirsch.

Loft owned a number of quality racehorses including the very good colt, Papp. In 1917 Papp won the most important race for two-year-olds, the Belmont Futurity Stakes and that same year his filly, Julialeon, won the 1917 Stuyvesant Handicap at Jamaica Race Course. In 1920, he purchased Tippity Witchet, a gelding who raced through age fourteen and after being sold would later retire with seventy-eight wins, fourth all-time among American horses. In 1925, Loft won the prestigious Manhattan Handicap with the gelding, Pepp. In steeplechase racing, his horse Sweepment was the 1921 the Champion timber-topper.

=== Death and burial ===
George W. Loft died in Baldwin, New York, on November 6, 1943, and was interred in St. Raymond's Cemetery in The Bronx.

U.S. House of Representatives
| Preceded by Timothy D. Sullivan | Member of the U.S. House of Representatives from New York's 13th congressional district November 4, 1913 – March 3, 1917 | Succeeded by Christopher D. Sullivan |
