= Clarence Kummer =

American jockey (1899–1930)

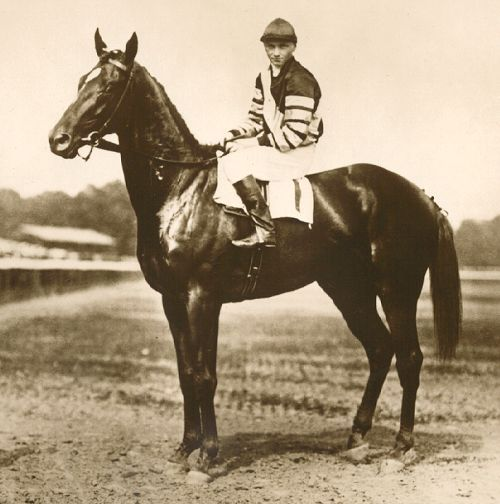
- Clarence Kummer on Man o' War, 1920

Personal information
- Born: August 8, 1899 New York City, New York, U.S.
- Died: December 18, 1930 (aged 31) Flushing, Queens, New York
- Occupation: Jockey

Horse racing career
- Sport: Horse racing
- Career wins: 464 (18.8%)

Major racing wins
- Aberdeen Stakes (1918); Champlain Handicap (1918); Delaware Handicap (1919, 1922); Westchester Handicap (1919); Pierrepont Handicap (1919, 1921); Aqueduct Handicap (1920); Dwyer Stakes (1920); Great American Stakes (1920); Jerome Handicap (1920); Jockey Club Gold Cup (1920); Manhattan Handicap (1920); Saranac Handicap (1920); Saratoga Handicap (1920); Stuyvesant Handicap (1920); Withers Stakes (1920, 1922); Astoria Stakes (1921); Carter Handicap (1921); Demoiselle Stakes (1921); Huron Handicap (1921); Juvenile Stakes (1921); Suburban Handicap (1921, 1927); Toboggan Handicap (1921); Tremont Stakes (1921, 1922); Adirondack Stakes (1922); Hopeful Stakes (1922); Maryland Handicap (1922); Oakdale Handicap (1923); Edgemere Handicap (1924); Paumonok Handicap (1924); Mount Vernon Handicap (1924); International Special No.2 (1924); Travers Stakes (1925); Youthful Stakes (1925) American Classic Race wins: Preakness Stakes (1920, 1925); Belmont Stakes (1920, 1928)

Racing awards
- United States Champion Jockey by earnings (1920)

Honours
- United States' Racing Hall of Fame (1972)

Significant horses
- Sir Barton, Man o' War, Exterminator, Sarazen; Zev, Chance Play, St. James, Coventry, Vito

Clarence Joseph Kummer (August 8, 1899 – December 18, 1930) was a U.S. Racing Hall of Fame jockey who won four American Classic Races.

In early 1920, Kummer rode the 1919 Triple Crown Champion Sir Barton to a new Saratoga track record in winning the Saratoga Handicap. In May 1920 he was given the opportunity to ride Man o' War. He rode the horse to nine wins in nine starts. Kummer's successes in 1920 made him that year's top money-winning jockey in the United States.

Clarence Kummer won the Preakness and Belmont Stakes twice each and had four mounts in the Kentucky Derby with his best result a second-place finish in 1923. In a relatively short career he won numerous important races, including the 1925 edition of the prestigious Travers Stakes, but by the end of the latter part of the 1920s constantly battled weight gains and was forced to retire after the 1928 racing season in which he had won his second Belmont Stakes. He then worked as an exercise rider for trainer Sunny Jim Fitzsimmons but was attempting a comeback in 1930 when he died from pneumonia believed to have been as a result of his weakened physical condition brought on by a harsh dieting regimen.

On December 1, 1921, Clarence Kummer married Marion Gascoyne. They had one daughter, Jacqueline (died 2007) In 1932, his widow married another future Hall of Fame jockey, Earl Sande.

Clarence Kummer was inducted in the United States' Racing Hall of Fame in 1972.
