= Henry McDaniel (racehorse trainer) =

American racehorse trainer

Personal information
- Born: September 10, 1867 Secaucus, New Jersey
- Died: January 24, 1948 (aged 80) Coral Gables, Florida
- Occupation: Trainer

Horse racing career
- Sport: Horse racing

Major racing wins
- Twin City Handicap (1895); Dash Stakes (1906); Sapphire Stakes (1906); Victoria Stakes (1910); Connaught Cup Stakes (1914, 1922, 1924); Great American Stakes (1917); Hopeful Stakes (1917, 1930); Saratoga Special Stakes (1917); Delaware Handicap (1918, 1930, 1931); Travers Stakes (1918); Ben Ali Handicap (1919); Champlain Handicap (1919, 1931, 1933); Saratoga Cup (1919); Pimlico Cup Handicap (1919, 1920, 1921); Autumn Gold Cup (1920); Toronto Autumn Cup (1920); Brookdale Handicap (1920); Jockey Club Cup Handicap (1920); Bowie Handicap (1921, 1928); Grey Stakes (1921, 1922, 1923, 1924, 1925, 1926); King Edward Stakes (1921, 1923, 1924); King's Plate (Quebec) (1921,1926); Merchants and Citizens Handicap (1921); Philadelphia Handicap (1921,1922, 1923); Windsor Hotel Cup Handicap (1921, 1922); Brooklyn Handicap (1922); Clark Handicap (1922); Brooklyn Handicap (1922); Hamilton Derby (1922); Rennert Handicap (1922); Coffroth Handicap (1923); Durham Cup Stakes (1923); Juvenile Stakes (1926); Quebec Derby (1926); Tremont Stakes (1926); Demoiselle Stakes (1927, 1929); Dwyer Stakes (1928); Empire City Derby (1928, 1929); Laurel Futurity Stakes (1929); Woodhaven Stakes (1929); Carter Handicap (1930); Fleetwing Handicap (1930); Jerome Stakes (1930); Manhattan Handicap (1930, 1931); Shevlin Stakes (1930); Bay Shore Handicap (1931); Cowdin Stakes (1935); Walden Stakes (1935); Fashion Stakes (1937); Butler Handicap (1939); Toboggan Handicap (1939); Queens County Handicap (1939); Empire City Handicap (1939) American Classic Race wins: Kentucky Derby (1918); Belmont Stakes (1933)

Racing awards
- U.S. Co-Champion Trainer by wins (1922)

Honours
- U.S. Racing Hall of Fame (1956) (Inaugural class)

Significant horses
- Exterminator, Flying Heels, Rey del Carreres, Reigh Count, Sun Beau, Sun Briar

Henry Ernest McDaniel (September 10, 1867 – January 24, 1948) was an American Hall of Fame and national Champion trainer of Thoroughbred racehorses. He was the brother of trainer William Lee McDaniel. Their father was the prominent New Jersey trainer Col. David McDaniel who won three straight editions of the Belmont Stakes and who bred horses at his Stony Brook stud farm at Princeton, New Jersey.

In a career that spanned 64 years (1884–1947), the most famous of the horses Henry McDaniel trained was Exterminator, winner of the 1918 Kentucky Derby and an American Horse of the Year honoree as well as Champion Older Horse three times. With Hurryoff, McDaniel won the 1933 Belmont Stakes, a race that would become the third leg of the U. S. Triple Crown series.

One of the most sought after trainers of his generation, Henry McDaniel was hired by major industry figures such as Lucky Baldwin, Gifford A. Cochran, F. Ambrose Clark, Robert T. Davies, Hope Goddard Iselin, Willis Sharpe Kilmer, J. K. L. Ross, Walter P. Chrysler Jr., Robert T. Davies and Joseph E. Widener.

Henry McDaniel died at a hospital in Coral Gables, Florida on January 24, 1948, at age 80. He was buried next to his wife Leonora in the Forest Home Cemetery in Chicago.

Following its formation, Henry McDaniel was inducted in the United States' National Museum of Racing and Hall of Fame in 1956.
