= HMCS Tuna =

Steam yacht and Canadian Navy torpedo boat

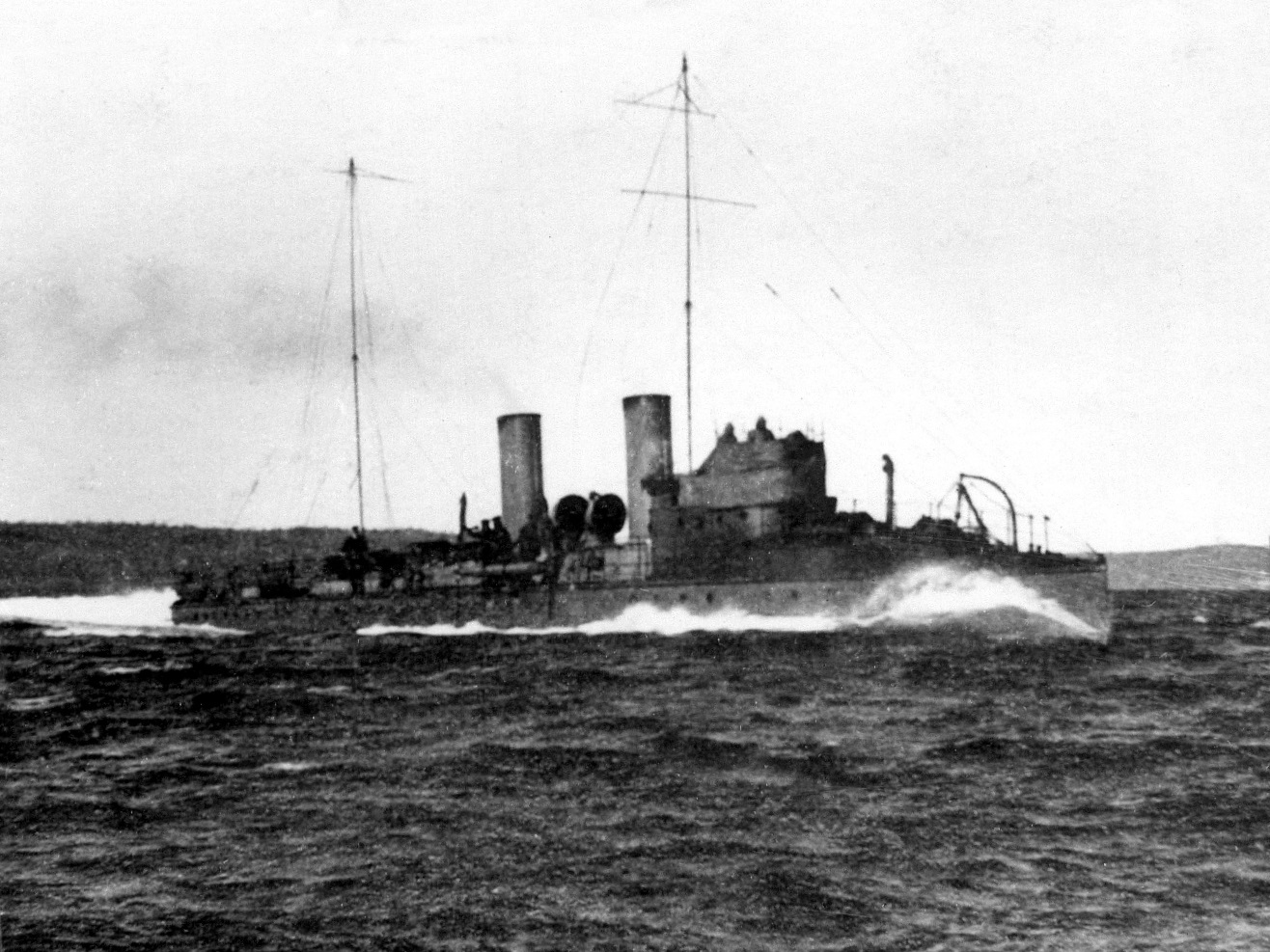
- HMCS Tuna under way

History
- Name: 1902: Tarantula; 1914: Tuna
- Namesake: 1902: tarantula; 1914: tuna
- Owner: 1902: Harry McCalmont; 1903: WK Vanderbilt, Jr; 1914: George Lawley & Son; 1914: JKL Ross; 1914: Minister of Naval Service
- Operator: 1914: (United Kingdom) Royal Canadian Navy
- Port of registry: 1902: (United Kingdom) London; 1903: (United States) New York; 1914: (United Kingdom) Montreal
- Builder: Yarrow Shipbuilders, Poplar
- Completed: 1902
- Commissioned: into RCN, 5 December 1914
- Decommissioned: from RCN, 10 May 1917
- Identification: 1902: UK official number 115849; 1903: code letters TLFR; 1907: code letters KTQD; 1914: pennant number QW-2; 1916: code letters TMJQ
- Fate: hulked, 1918

General characteristics
- Type: steam yacht
- Tonnage: 124 GRT, 84 NRT
- Length: 152.7 ft (46.5 m)
- Beam: 15.35 ft (4.68 m)
- Draught: 5 ft (1.5 m)
- Depth: 8.7 ft (2.7 m)
- Decks: 1
- Propulsion: 1902: 3 × steam turbines; 3 × shafts; 1904: 2 × steam turbines; 2 × shafts
- Speed: 26.75 knots (49.5 km/h)
- Armament: in First World War: 2 × 14 in (360 mm) torpedo tubes; 1 × 3-pounder gun

HMCS Tuna was a steam yacht that was converted into a Royal Canadian Navy torpedo boat. She was the first turbine-powered steam yacht ever built. She was built in London, England in 1902 as Tarantula for Colonel Harry McCalmont. He died soon after she was completed, and in 1903 William Kissam Vanderbilt II acquired her. In 1914 JKL "Jack" Ross bought her and transferred her to the Minister of Naval Service for Canada, who had her converted into a torpedo boat. She served in the First World War until 1917, when she became irreparably unfit for service. She was sold for scrap in 1918, and her hulk survived in Halifax, Nova Scotia until the 1930s.

== Built for Harry McCalmont ==
Cox & King of Pall Mall, London designed the yacht. Yarrow Shipbuilders of Poplar, London built her in 1902 for Harry McCalmont, who was a colonel in the British Army; a Conservative Member of Parliament; and a member of the Royal Yacht Squadron. Her length was 152.7 ft (46.5 m), her beam was 15.35 ft (4.68 m), and her depth was 8.7 ft (2.7 m). Her tonnages were 124 GRT, 84 NRT, and 172 Thames Measurement. Like Charles Parsons' Turbinia, she had three drive shafts, each driven by a steam turbine, and with more than one screw on each shaft. She was the first turbine-driven steam yacht ever built. She was reputed to be capable of 24 knots (44 km/h). Her lines were similar to those of a destroyer of her era, and quite unlike most steam yachts of the first decade of the 20th century. She was registered in London. Her United Kingdom official number was 115849, and by 1903 her code letters were TLFR.

== Bought by William K Vanderbilt ==
McCalmont died in December 1902. By March 1903 WK Vanderbilt II had acquired Tarantula. He had her delivered from England to the United States that July and August. Her coal bunkers were too small for her to cross the North Atlantic entirely under her own power, so Vanderbilt had her towed as far as Bermuda. From there she steamed to Newport News, Virginia under her own power. At times she developed up to 26.75 knots (49.5 km/h). She reached Newport News on 5 August. He registered her in New York. By 1907 her code letters were KTQD.

Experiments suggested that Tarantula would be just as swift without her middle turbine. Toward the end of 1903, Vanderbilt decided to have the middle turbine removed to save weight. The work was undertaken at Tebo's Pier in South Brooklyn in January 1904. At the same time, her forward deckhouse was converted into a dining saloon, and her after deckhouse was converted into a lounge. On 7 May, Tarantula was at anchor off Robert Jacob's shipyard on City Island, Bronx, being overhauled by a party of 32 men, when the lead-acid batteries for her electric lighting system exploded. Her battery room was in her forward hold. The explosion injured three men, one with serious acid burns to his face. He was admitted to Fordham Hospital, where it was feared that he would lose his eyesight. The explosion tore out the bulkheads of her battery room and galley; caused a fire that burned for a few minutes; and caused damage worth an estimated $2,000.

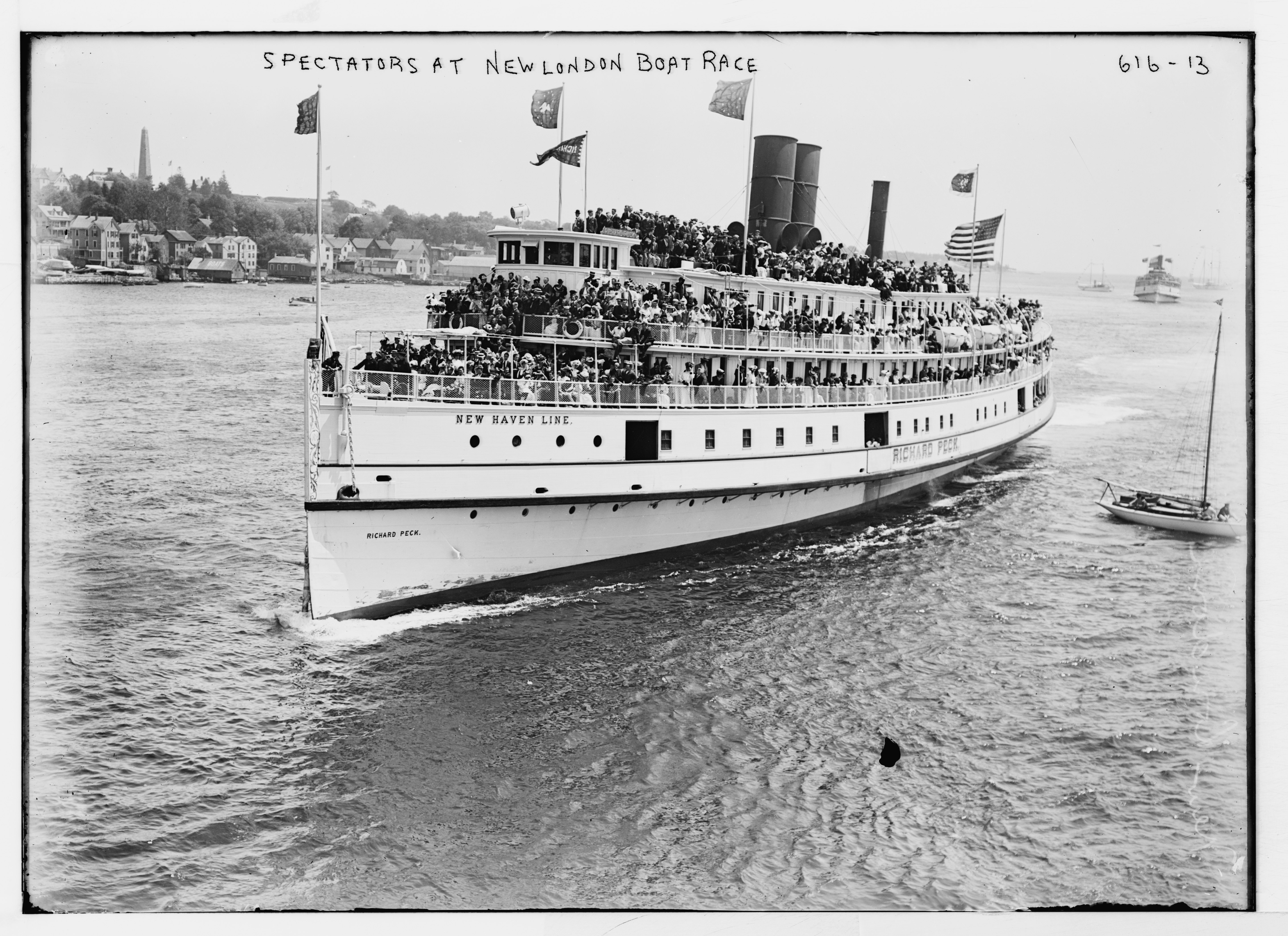
The New Haven Railroad steamship Richard Peck

Some fast steam yachts would informally race fast coastal passenger steamships. On 18 May 1904, Vanderbilt tried to use Tarantula to race the New York, New Haven and Hartford Railroad steamship Richard Peck in Long Island Sound. The two steamers were neck and neck until Hart Island, where Vanderbilt broke off the race and turned Tarantula back toward his private anchorage in Great Neck, Long Island. In June, Vanderbilt offered to sell Tarantula to the United States Department of the Navy, for research into turbine propulsion. His offer was declined. Opponents of the purchase noted that since Tarantula was built in 1902, turbine propulsion had been further developed. The department should therefore buy a brand new turbine craft, rather than one built two years ago. On 28 September, Howard Gould's steam yacht Niagara IV raced Tarantula in a formal race over a 39-nautical-mile (72 km) course in Long Island Sound from Stepping Stones Light, turning at a buoy at Eatons Neck Light. Niagara IV had triple-expansion reciprocating engines, but beat the turbine steamer by 3 minutes and 50 seconds.

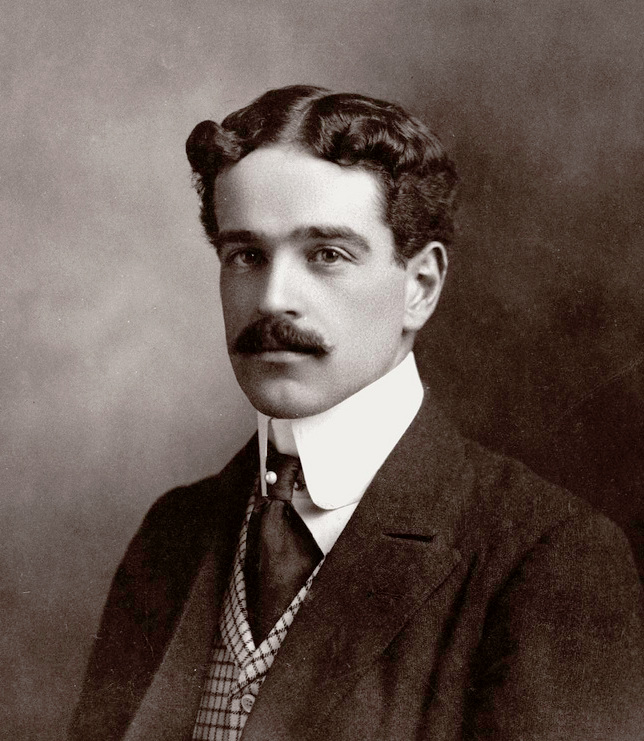
WK Vanderbilt Jr

In February 1905, the Seawanhaka Corinthian Yacht Club elected WK Vanderbilt Jr as its Commodore. He made his sloop Virginia his flagship, and Tarantula her tender. In 1905 Vanderbilt had had Tarantula's original Yarrow boilers removed, and replaced with new ones with twice the heating capacity and furnace grate area. On 9 May that year, Tarantula ran a set of sea trials over the Government course at Great Neck, on which she averaged 25 knots (46 km/h).

Around the beginning of June 1905, Tarantula broke one of her propeller shafts while racing Niagara IV, which then took Tarantula in tow. When Vanderbilt had her middle turbine removed, he replaced the small screws on the port and starboard shafts with one large screw on each, contrary to Parsons' recommendation. This may have increased the strain on the shafts, and contributed to the breakage. On 26 June, Tarantula accidentally collided with the yacht Norman in Long Island Channel. The collision stove in Tarantula's bow, deeply scored Norman's hull, and tore a "naphtha launch" (i.e. motorboat) from its davits aboard Norman. Both yachts remained afloat, and Tarantula went to Robert Jacob's shipyard on City Island for repair. On 20 July, Charles Ranlett Flint's yacht Arrow beat Tarantula in an impromptu race from Great Neck to the New York Yacht Club station at the foot of East 23rd Street. On 15 September, Niagara IV and Tarantula raced each other in Long Island Sound again. The course was 40 nautical miles (74 km), from Bridgeport to New Haven and back. Each owner staked $5,000 in a sweepstake, and this time Tarantula won.

On 21 May 1906, Tarantula was entering Hampton Roads when she suffered an accident to her machinery. She limped into Newport News, but was back in service by 6 July. On 21 July, Tarantula broke one of her propeller shafts and lost two of her screws after colliding with an unidentified submerged object between Point Judith Light and Beavertail Lighthouse. She reached Newport, Rhode Island under her own power, but at reduced speed.

On 1 January 1909, WK Vanderbilt and guests left either Havana or Cárdenas (reports differ), Cuba aboard Tarantula for a fishing trip to Nuevitas. On the trip, one of the yacht's boiler tubes failed, scalding two members of her crew. She returned to Havana on 4 January for repairs.

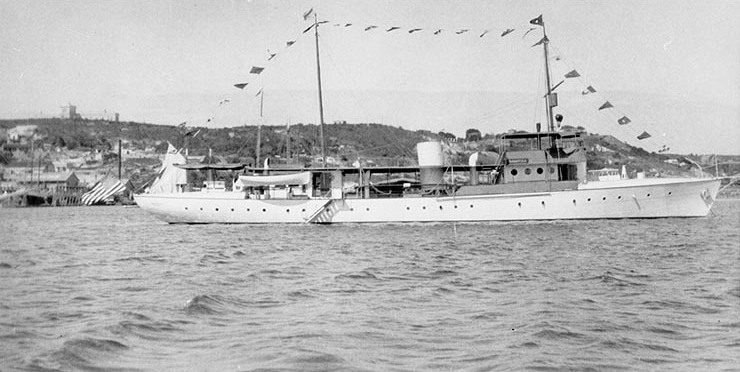
Vanderbilt's second Tarantula

By November 1912, Vanderbilt had ordered a new yacht, also to be named Tarantula. George Lawley & Son in Neponset, Boston were building her, and she was to be a motor yacht. By May 1914, Vanderbilt had taken delivery of the new yacht, and had traded in the 1902 Tarantula to Lawley & Son.

== Bought by Jack Ross ==
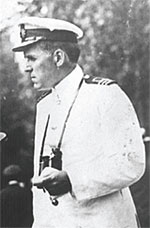
Commander J. K. L. Ross

In August 1914, after the First World War began, the Canadian industrialist Jack Ross acquired the 1902 Tarantula from Lawley & Son. The United States, being neutral, forbade the sale to any belligerent country in the war of any ship that could be adapted for naval use. Ross circumvented this by having Tarantula fitted out in secret in the US, and delivered to Canada by a civilian crew. She reached Halifax, Nova Scotia, on 10 September 1914. Ross sold her to the Canadian Naval Ministry for $1, and offered to buy her back at the end of the war if she were still functional. She was registered in Montreal as a merchant ship, with the code letters TMJQ.

The yacht was armed with two 14 in (360 mm) torpedo tubes and one 3-pounder gun, and commissioned on 5 December 1914 as HMCS Tuna, with the pennant number QW-2, and Ross as her commanding officer. She was based at Halifax, and patrolled from there.

In July 1916, Tuna was overhauled at Sorel, Quebec. On 10 May 1917, she was decommissioned due to an irreparable fracture in one of her engine mounts. In June 1918 she was sold for scrap, and hulked. One shipping register continued to list Ross as her owner until 1921. Her hulk remained in Halifax's Northwest Arm until the 1930s.

== Bibliography ==
- Johnston, William; Rawling, William GP; Gimblett, Richard H; MacFarlane, John (2010). The Seabound Coast: The Official History of the Royal Canadian Navy, 1867–1939. Vol. 1. Toronto, ON: Dundurn Press. ISBN 978-1-55488-908-2.
- Macpherson, Ken & Barrie, Ron (2002). The Ships of Canada's Naval Forces 1910–2002 (Third ed.). St Catharines, ON: Vanwell Publishing. ISBN 1-55125-072-1.
- Mercantile Navy List. London. 1903 – via Crew List Index Project.
- Mercantile Navy List. London. 1916 – via Crew List Index Project.
- Mercantile Navy List. London. 1921 – via Crew List Index Project.
- Milner, Marc (2010). Canada's Navy: The First Century (Second ed.). Toronto, ON: University of Toronto Press. ISBN 978-0-8020-9604-3.
- Register of Yachts. London: Lloyd's Register of Shipping. 1906 – via Internet Archive.
- Register of Yachts. London: Lloyd's Register of Shipping. 1907 – via Internet Archive.
- Register of Yachts. London: Lloyd's Register of Shipping. 1914 – via Internet Archive.
- Yacht Register. London: Lloyd's Register of Shipping. 1904 – via Internet Archive.
