= Fair Stable =

American Thoroughbred horse racing stable

- Type: Nom de course
- Industry: Thoroughbred horse racing
- Founded: c.1920
- Defunct: 1935
- Headquarters: United States
- Key people: Virginia Graham Fair (owner); Max Hirsch, Alex Gordon (trainers)

Fair Stable was an American Thoroughbred horse racing stable owned by heiress Virginia Graham Fair that operated during the 1920s and the first half of the 1930s. Ms. Fair was the daughter of the wealthy mining magnate James Graham Fair. In 1899, she married William Kissam Vanderbilt II of the prominent Vanderbilt family of New York City who in 1920 inherited the Haras du Quesnay Thoroughbred breeding farm and racing stable near Deauville in France's famous horse region of Lower Normandy. Interested in horse racing, but separated from her husband, Virginia Graham Fair established her own racing stable.

Fair Stable employed future Hall of Fame trainer Max Hirsch until 1928 when Alex Gordon took over. They won a number of important Graded stakes races including the 1923, 1927, and 1931 Champagne Stakes at Belmont Park. The stable had only one horse run in the Kentucky Derby with Chicatie finishing 14th in the 1929 edition.

By far the most famous horse owed by Fair Stable was Sarazen, a gelding acquired in 1923 who would earn back-to-back U.S. Horse of the Year honors in 1924 and 1925 and who was posthumously inducted into the United States' National Museum of Racing and Hall of Fame.

As part of a program honoring important horse racing tracks and racing stables, the Pennsylvania Railroad named its baggage car #5853 the "Fair Stable".

Virginia Graham Fair Vanderbilt died in 1935 and her estate sold off the racing stable but daughter Muriel Vanderbilt would follow in her mother's footsteps and set up her own racing operation which would include the Hall of Fame filly, Desert Vixen.
