= Kissam =

Kissam is a surname. Notable people with the surname include:

- William Kissam Vanderbilt (1849–1920), American heir, businessman, philanthropist and horsebreeder
- William Kissam Vanderbilt II (1878–1944), American heir, motor racing enthusiast and yachtsman
