= Jumbolair Airport =

Airport in Florida, U.S.

Coordinates: 29°16′49″N 082°07′29″W

Jumbolair
- IATA: none; ICAO: none; FAA LID: 17FL

Summary
- Airport type: Private
- Owner: Jumbolair Development LLC
- Operator: Robert Bull
- Serves: Ocala, Florida
- Location: Anthony, Florida
- Elevation AMSL: 100 ft (30 m)
- Website: jumbolair.com
- Interactive map of Jumbolair

Runways
Direction	Length		Surface
Direction	ft	m	Surface
18/36	7,380	2,249	Asphalt
9/27 (closed indefinitely)	3,457	1,054	Turf
- Source: Federal Aviation Administration

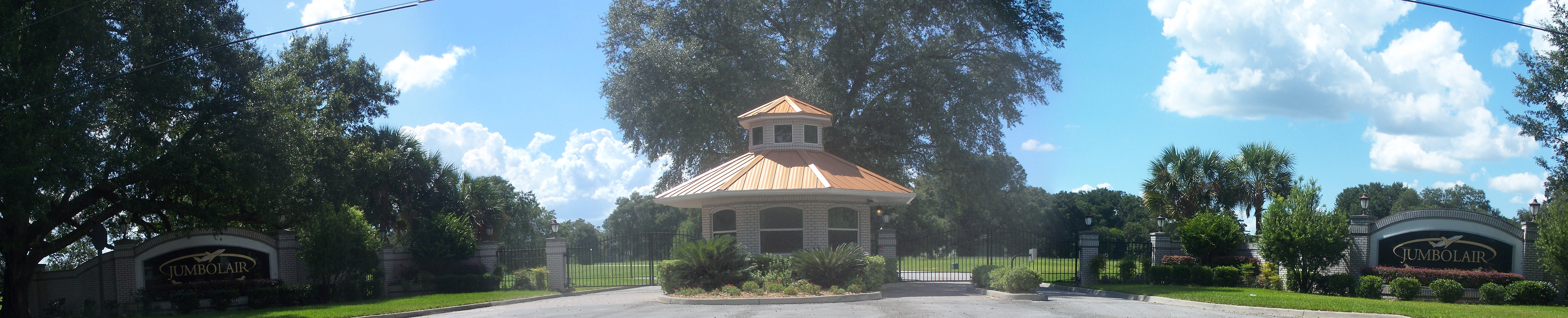
Entrance to Jumbolair

Jumbolair Airport (FAA LID: 17FL) is a private-use airport. It is located in the unincorporated community of Anthony, which is seven miles (11 km) northeast of Ocala, Florida, United States. Frank Merschman owned and operated Jumbolair until 2019, when it was sold to Jumbolair Development LLC, managed by Robert and Debra Bull. The airport has two runways: 18/36 with an asphalt pavement measuring 7,380 ft × 190 ft (2,249 m × 58 m) and 9/27 with a grass surface measuring 3,457 ft × 100 ft (1,054 m × 30 m), which is now closed indefinitely. According to FAA documents, 9/27 ""Greystone"" grass airstrip was once degraded to the point that only the smallest aircraft could use it.

== Jumbolair ==
Jumbolair Aviation & Equestrian Estates is an aviation-related gated community and airpark situated alongside the airport's runway, the largest private paved airfield in the United States. A 380-acre (150 ha) horse ranch built by Muriel Vanderbilt, which was purchased by Arthur Jones (inventor of the Nautilus cam) in 1980, sits at the community's center. The 550-acre (220 ha) development contains multiple 3-acre (1.2 ha) lots connected by taxiways which lead to the runways.

John Travolta and his wife Kelly Preston were some of the first land purchasers. The runway length allowed Travolta, a pilot, to operate his ex-Qantas Airlines Boeing 707 jetliner. Travolta announced in May 2017 that the aircraft had been donated to the Historical Aircraft Restoration Society near Wollongong, Australia. In January 2007, litigation prevented all property owners in the subdivision from accessing the runway with their aircraft. The access issue was resolved when Jumbolair purchased the adjacent land and remaining airport rights.

== Accidents and incidents ==
On August 26, 1985, a Luscombe 8E Silvaire, registration number N47BM, was observed to make two steep turns and enter a spin at an altitude of about 200 feet (61 m) AGL immediately after takeoff from Runway 9 at Greystone; the ensuing crash killed the pilot and passenger and destroyed the airplane. Witnesses reported to investigators that the pilot had previously exhibited a lack of control coordination in the aircraft and had engaged in reckless flying on previous occasions. The accident is attributed to the pilot's loss of control and his subsequent stall/spin and uncontrolled descent. The pilot's "ostentatious display", "improper use of procedure", "overconfidence in [his] personal ability", and "overconfidence in [the] aircraft's ability" are noted in the report.

== See also ==
- List of airports in Florida
