= Virginia Fair Vanderbilt =

American socialite, hotel builder/owner and philanthropist

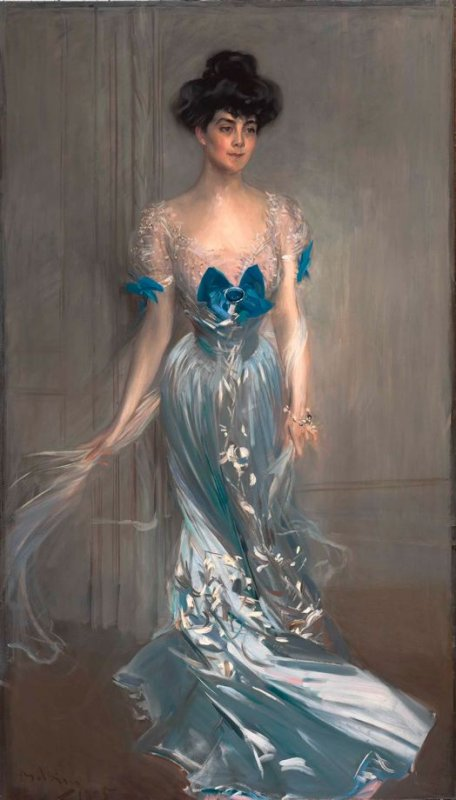
- Portrait by Giovanni Boldini, c. 1900
- Born: Virginia Graham Fair; January 2, 1875; San Francisco, California
- Died: July 7, 1935 (aged 60); Manhattan, New York
- Resting place: Woodlawn Cemetery Bronx, New York
- Occupations: Hotel builder/owner Racehorse owner
- Spouse: William Kissam Vanderbilt II (m. 1899; div. 1927)
- Children: William Kissam Vanderbilt III; Muriel Vanderbilt; Consuelo Vanderbilt Earl
- Parent(s): James Graham Fair; Theresa Rooney
- Relatives: Theresa Fair Oelrichs (sister)

Virginia Fair Vanderbilt (January 2, 1875 – July 7, 1935) was an American socialite, hotel builder/owner, philanthropist, owner of Fair Stable, a Thoroughbred racehorse operation, and a member of the prominent Vanderbilt family by marriage.

== Early life ==
Virginia was born on January 2, 1875, in San Francisco, California. She was the daughter of James Graham Fair (1831–1894) and his wife, Theresa Rooney (1838–1891). Her parents divorced when she was six. She was known throughout her life as "Birdie". She had three siblings, Theresa Fair Oelrichs, James Fair Jr. (1861–1892), and Charles Lewis Fair (1867–1902).

Her father, James Graham Fair, was an Irish immigrant who made a fortune from mining the Comstock Lode and the Big Bonanza mine in Virginia City and Carson City, Nevada respectively. A United States Senator from Nevada from 1881 to 1887, James Graham Fair died in 1894, leaving his daughter a fortune.

== Society life ==
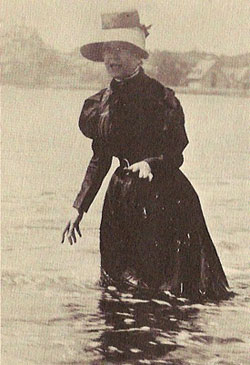
Virginia wading in the water at Bailey's Beach

In 1899, Birdie Vanderbilt and her sister Theresa "Tessie" Fair Oelrichs built the Rosecliff mansion in Newport, Rhode Island. In 1902, the sisters began construction of the Fairmont Hotel in San Francisco but sold their interests in 1906, days before the 1906 San Francisco earthquake. However, following the death of her husband, Tessie Fair Oelrichs repurchased the property in 1908, retaining ownership until 1924. In 1910, Birdie set up the Virginia Fair Legacy Fund that rebuilt and endowed the Holy Family Day Home, a Roman Catholic school residence for children in San Francisco that had been damaged by the 1906 earthquake.

Birdie Vanderbilt also spent considerable time in Paris, France, where tragedy struck in 1902 when her brother Charles and his wife were killed in an automobile accident. In 1920, her estranged husband, who also maintained a home in the Parisian suburb of Passy, inherited the Haras du Quesnay Thoroughbred breeding farm and racing stable near Deauville in France's famous horse region of Lower Normandy. Interested in horse racing herself, Birdie established her own racing stable in the United States. Named Fair Stable, she met with great success with the Thoroughbred Sarazen, who earned back-to-back U.S. Horse of the Year honors in 1924 and 1925 and would be inducted into the United States' National Museum of Racing and Hall of Fame.

In 1933, tragedy struck her family again when her 26-year-old son, William Kissam Vanderbilt III, was killed in an automobile accident in South Carolina while driving home to New York City from his father's Florida estate.

== Personal life ==
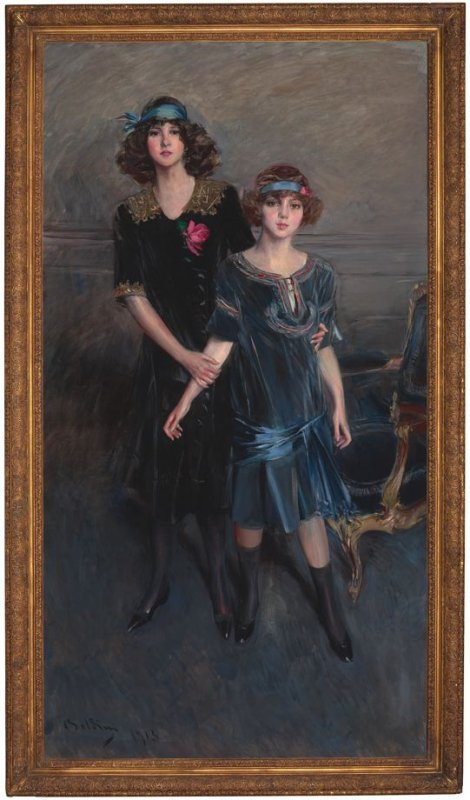
Portrait of her daughters, Consuelo and Muriel by Giovanni Boldini.

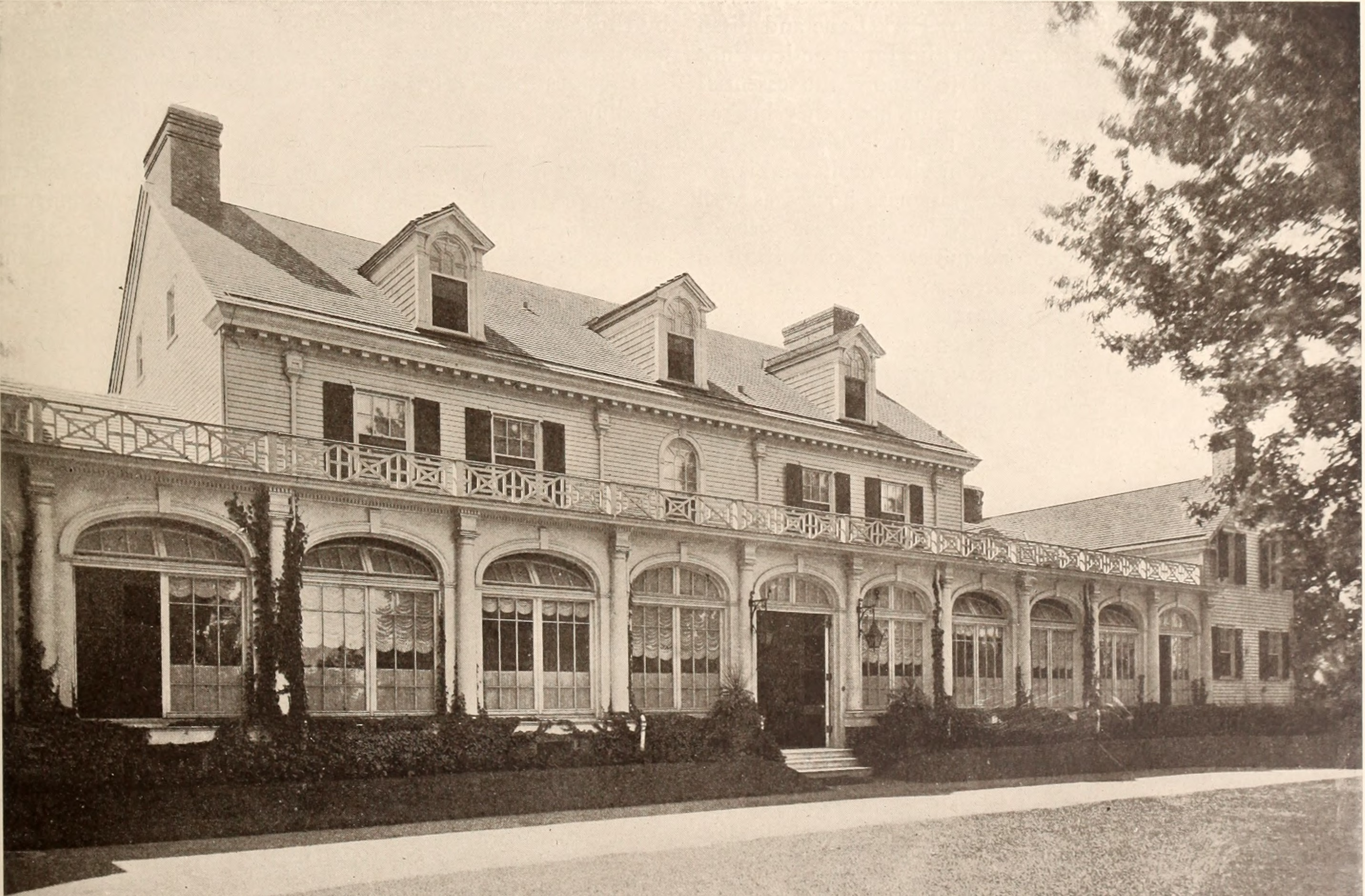
Deepdale

On March 26, 1899, Virginia Graham Fair married William Kissam Vanderbilt II, a sportsman and president of the New York Central Railroad. They spent their honeymoon at the Idle Hour estate, but disaster struck when fire broke out and the mansion burned to the ground. They settled in a mansion at 666 Fifth Avenue in New York City and had three children before their separation and divorce:

- Muriel Vanderbilt (1900–1972), who married three times, the first in 1925 to Frederic Cameron Church Jr. She later married Henry Delafield Phelps in 1931. They divorced in 1936, and in 1944 she married John Payson Adams.
- Consuelo Vanderbilt (1903–2011) who first married Earl E. T. Smith (1903–1991), the U.S. Ambassador to Cuba, in 1926. They divorced in 1935 and she married Henry Gassaway Davis III (1902–1984), who was and the grandson of Henry G. Davis and recently divorced from her cousin, Grace Vanderbilt. They divorced in 1940 and she married William John Warburton III (1895–1979) in 1941. They divorced in 1946 and in 1951, she married Noble Clarkson Earl Jr. (1900–1969).
- William Kissam Vanderbilt III (1907–1933), who inherited his father's love of fast cars and exotic travel was killed in an automobile accident in South Carolina while driving home to New York City from his father's Florida estate.

The couple separated around 1909, but because she was a devout Roman Catholic and they had been married by the Church, they did not formally divorce until 1927, when her husband wanted to remarry. After their separation, she continued to use the Vanderbilt name but also did much under her maiden name. She began dividing her time between homes in Manhattan, Jericho, Long Island, and in her native California. Her mansion at 60 East 93rd Street later became the Permanent Mission of Romania to the United Nations, then part of the Lycée Français de New York until 2000, when it was sold to be converted back to a private residence.

She died in Manhattan from pneumonia on July 7, 1935. She is buried at Woodlawn Cemetery in the Bronx.
