= J. K. L. Ross =

Canadian businessman (1876–1951)

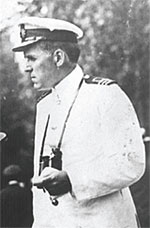
- Born: John Kenneth Leveson Ross; 31 March 1876; Lindsay, Ontario, Canada
- Died: 25 July 1951 (aged 75); Montego Bay, Jamaica
- Education: Bishop's College School
- Alma mater: McGill University
- Occupations: Businessman, philanthropist and racehorse owner/breeder
- Spouse(s): Ethel Matthews (m. 1902; div. 1930) Iris de Lisser (m. 1931)
- Children: James K. M. Ross; Hylda A. M. Ross Hodgson
- Parent(s): James Ross and Annie Kerr

Commander John Kenneth Leveson "Jack" Ross, CBE (31 March 1876 – 25 July 1951) was a Canadian businessman, sportsman, thoroughbred racehorse owner/breeder, and philanthropist. He is best remembered for winning the first United States Triple Crown of Thoroughbred Racing in 1919 with his Hall of Fame colt, Sir Barton. In 1911, he set the world record for catching the largest tuna (680 lb; 308 kg) by rod and line at St. Anns, Nova Scotia. After his father, he was the second Canadian to be made a member of the Royal Yacht Squadron.

== Early life ==
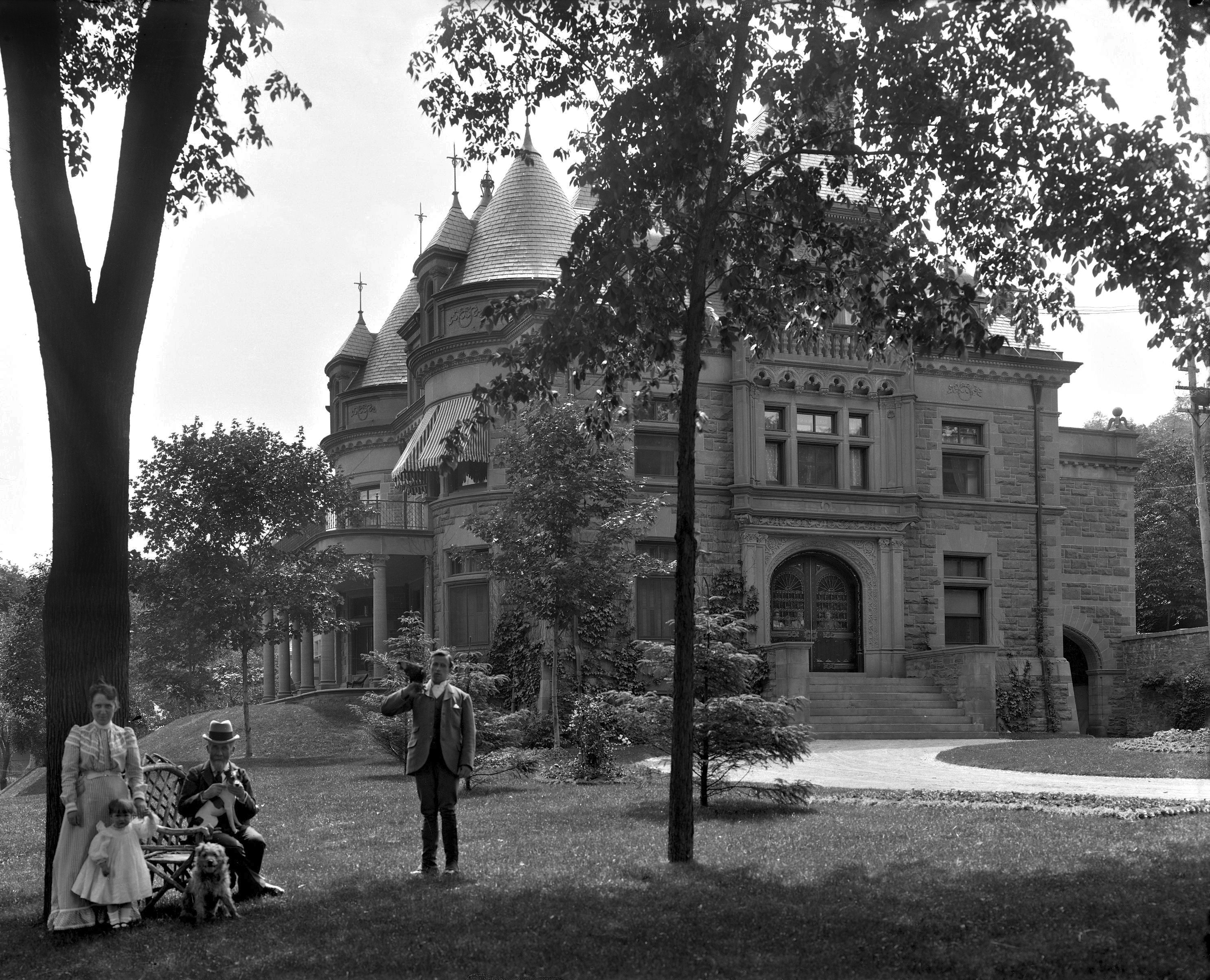
The James Ross mansion on Peel Street in Montreal, with J. K. L. Ross standing at right, c. 1910

Ross was born in Lindsay, Ontario, the only child of James Leveson Ross, who made his fortune constructing the Canadian Pacific Railway and become a prominent art collector and the first Canadian to be made a member of the Royal Yacht Squadron. His mother, Annie Kerr (1847–1915), was the daughter of John W. Kerr (1824–1904) of Kingston, New York, a prominent politician with the Democratic Party and formerly the Sheriff of Ulster County, New York.

Known as "Jack" to his friends, Ross grew up in Montreal's Golden Square Mile at his parents' French château-style mansion at 3644 Peel Street, designed by architect Bruce Price. The home was later bought by John W. McConnell and donated to McGill University, when it was renamed Chancellor Day Hall. Ross was educated at Bishop's College School in Lennoxville, Quebec, and at McGill University. He was an enthusiastic squash and racquets player, and was on the McGill ice hockey team and a member of the university's Canadian football championship team.

== Business ventures ==
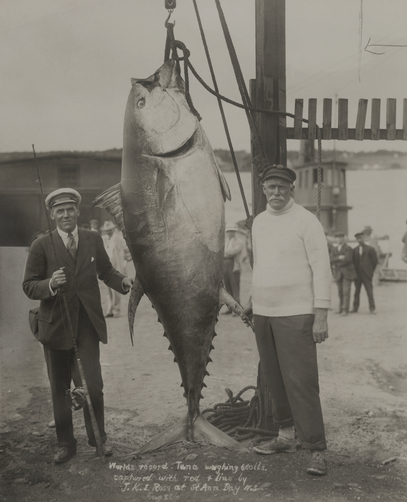
Ross with his catch, the largest tuna (680 lbs) in the world ever caught by rod and line, at St. Anns, Nova Scotia, 1911

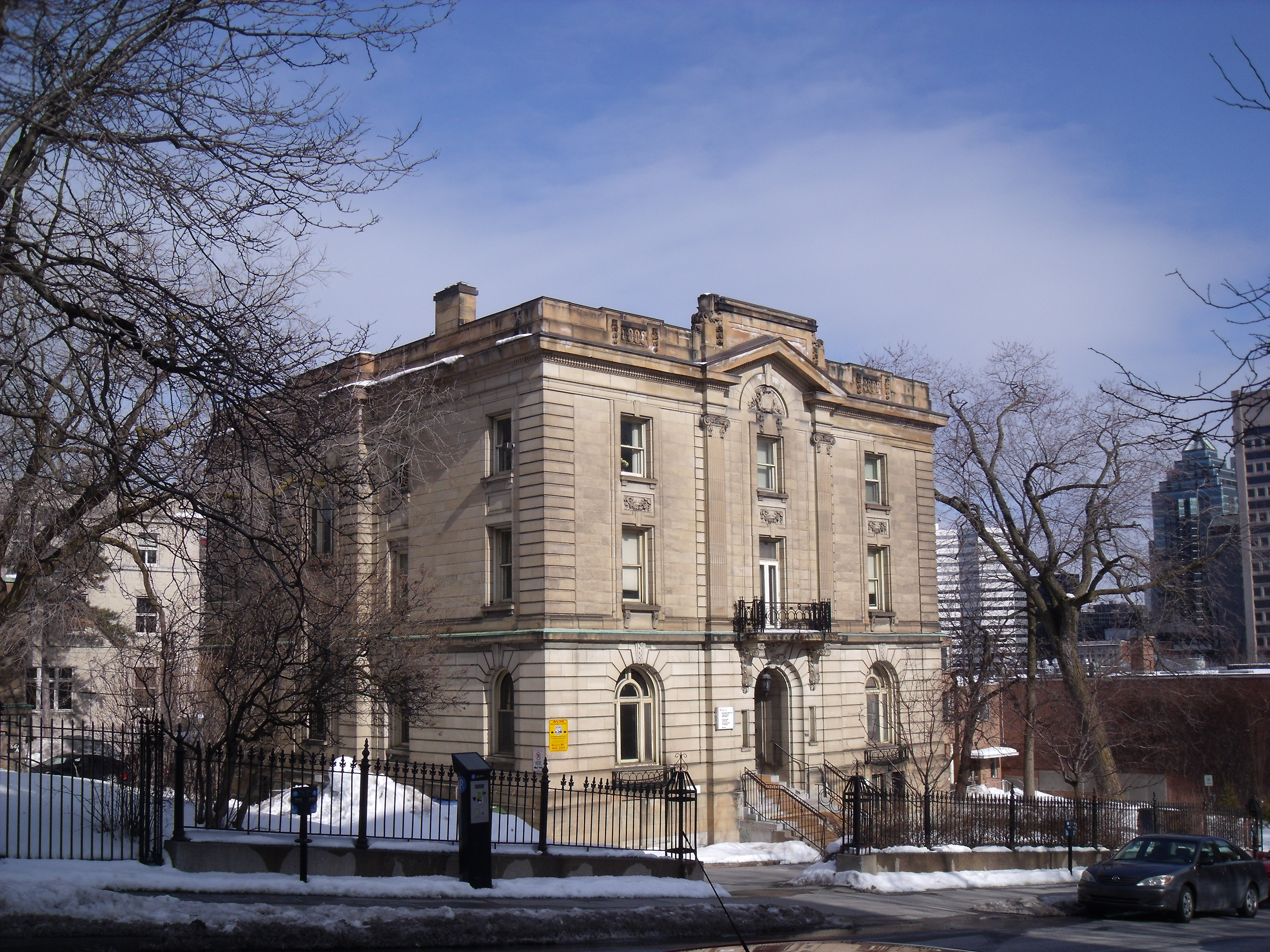
J.K.L. Ross House on Peel Street in Montreal, built in 1909

In co-operation with prominent Montreal businessman Sir Herbert Holt and others, Ross established Côte St. Luc Realties in 1911, which built the town of Hampstead, Quebec. In 1909, a house was built for Ross in Montreal at 3647 Peel Street, opposite his father's mansion. Designed by Edward Maxwell and his brother William Maxwell, it is now known as J.K.L. Ross House and is occupied by the Biomedical Ethics Unit and the Department of Social Studies of Medicine of the McGill University Faculty of Medicine. After his father's death in 1913 (when he inherited $16 million), he moved back to his childhood home and used the second one to house guests, the newer one being too small for parties. It was purchased by Marianopolis College in 1961 and used as administration offices until 1976, when McGill University acquired the property.

At one time, his father owned a controlling interest in Dominion Coal Company and Dominion Iron and Steel Company. As a result, Ross built a summer home at St. Anns Bay in the northern part of Victoria County, Nova Scotia, on Cape Breton Island. After his father's death, Ross moved to Nova Scotia, where for a time he was involved in the management of the companies.

== Tuna fishing ==
It was at St. Anns Bay that Ross developed a passion for the sport of deep-sea fishing. He tackled the sport scientifically and was a pioneer among tuna anglers, developing fishing techniques that later became standard practice. He wrote two books on the subject, describing various discoveries and adventures. He had remarkable tenacity, bearing in mind that harnesses were not yet invented, on one occasion he fought a tuna for 19 hours before being forced to cut his line. On 28 August 1911, after a struggle of a mere four hours and forty five minutes, Ross landed a 680-pound (308 kg) tuna which set a record for the largest fish caught with a rod and reel. The record held for several years until he himself bettered it by catching a 720-pound (327 kg) tuna. That record was broken in 1950 by his son-in-law, Commander Duncan Hodgson, who in the same way landed a 997-pound (452 kg) tuna off Cape Breton.

== World War I ==
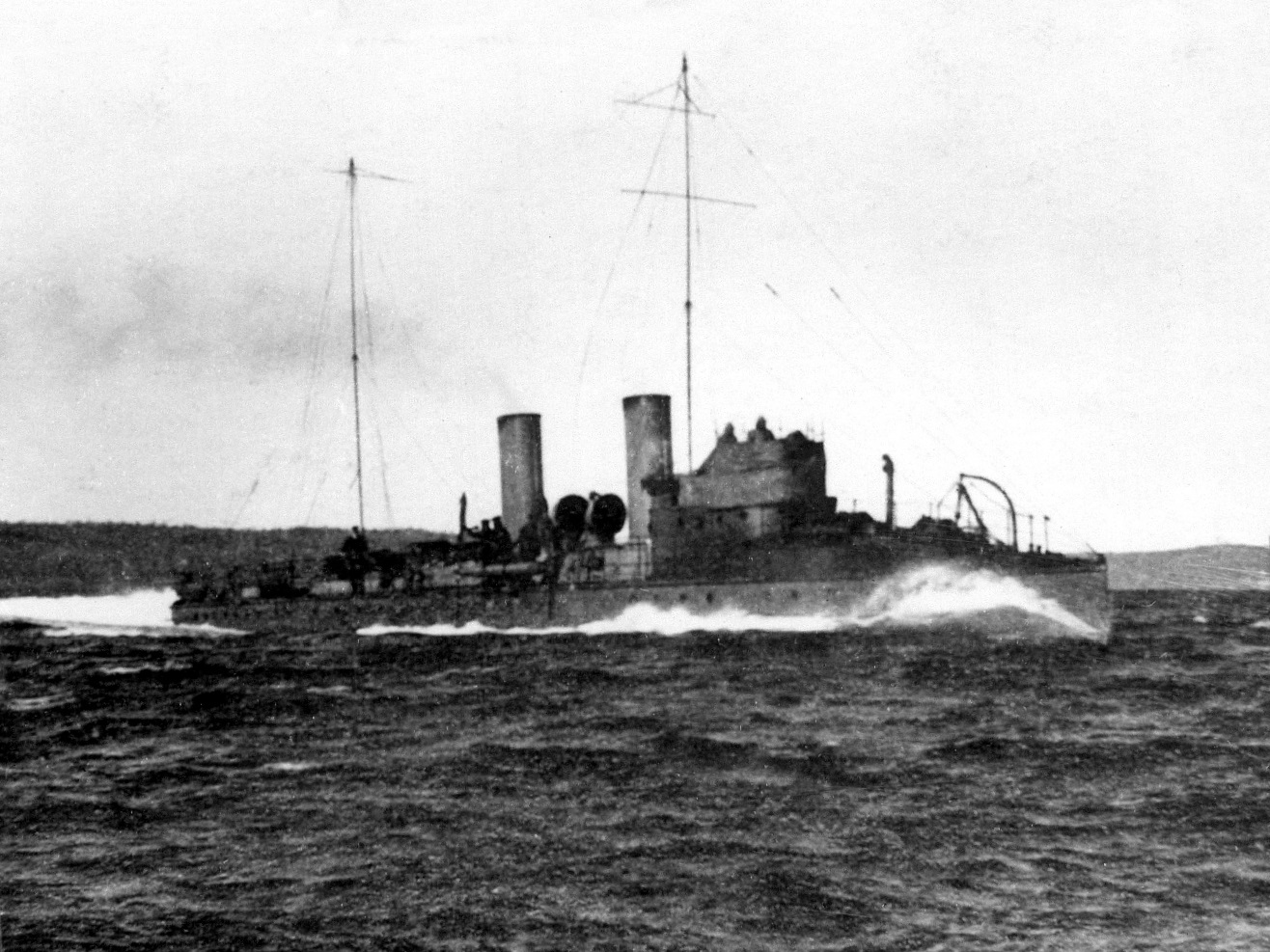
HMCS Tuna

In World War I, Ross donated three large yachts for use in the war effort by the Royal Canadian Navy and took command of one of them, the turbine steamship HMCS Tuna, in the North Atlantic. He was made a Commander of the Order of the British Empire for distinguished naval service. Afterwards, news media commonly referred to him as "Commander J.K.L. Ross." Ross was the second Canadian (after his father) to be made a member of the Royal Yacht Squadron.

== Philanthropy ==
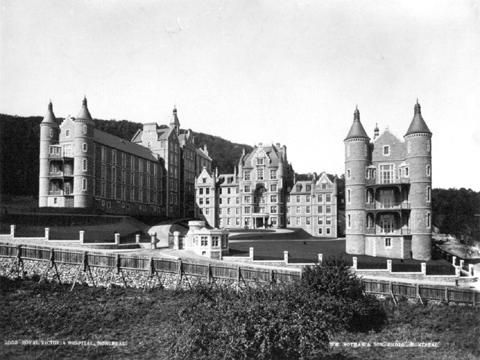
Royal Victoria Hospital, Montreal

James Ross had used his enormous wealth to become a major benefactor to Montreal, and his son continued the family's philanthropy. In 1916, acting on his late father's desire to support the Royal Victoria Hospital, Ross donated $1 million for the building of the first major addition to the hospital, which became known as the Ross Memorial Pavilion, one of Canada's first private patient pavilions.

During World War I, Ross donated $500,000 in cash to the Royal Navy. He also gave a further $500,000 to be distributed between the families of enlisted men killed in the war. He donated money to fund a new building (Ross Boarding House) at his alma mater, Bishop's College School, Lennoxville, and also gave liberally to McGill University.

== Thoroughbred racing ==
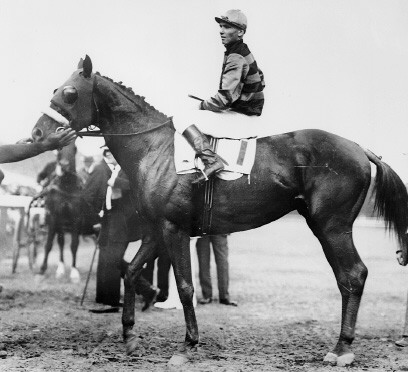
Sir Barton and jockey Johnny Loftus, Preakness Stakes, 1919

Ross owned several riding horses that led to an interest in Thoroughbred horse racing and breeding. In 1915, he purchased twelve Thoroughbreds that immediately paid dividends when Damrosch won the 1916 Preakness Stakes. Later that year, he acquired a 2,000-acre (8.1 km^{2}) farm property at Vercheres, Quebec where he established his own breeding operation. Ross contracted jockeys Earl Sande, Carroll Shilling and Johnny Loftus, all of whom went on to be elected to the United States Racing Hall of Fame, plus he hired H. Guy Bedwell who became one of America's leading trainers and who, too, was inducted in the US Racing Hall of Fame. Running one of the most successful racing stables in North America, at Toronto's Old Woodbine Race Course, his horses won numerous races including five editions each of the Maple Leaf Stakes, the Connaught Cup, and the Grey Stakes. Racing success led Jack Ross to build a second breeding and racing stable near Toronto that he called Agincourt Farms, and a third such operation in Maryland called the Yarrow Brae Stud Farm.

=== Sir Barton ===
In 1919, Ross owned two of the best three-year-olds in North America. Sir Barton and the 1918 American Champion Two-Year-Old Colt, Billy Kelly, finished one-two in the 1919 Kentucky Derby. Sir Barton then went on to win the Preakness Stakes and the Belmont Stakes to become the first-ever winner of the US Triple Crown. For 1919, Sir Barton was voted American Horse of the Year.

The following year, Sir Barton set a world record for 1 3/16 miles on dirt in winning the 28 August 1920, Merchants and Citizens Handicap at the Saratoga Race Course. However, plagued by tender hooves, Sir Barton was beaten in a now-famous match race on the hard dirt surface of Kenilworth Park in Windsor, Ontario by Man o' War. In 1957, Sir Barton was inducted into the US Racing Hall of Fame.

In addition to Sir Barton, notable among the Ross stable of racehorses were:

- Damrosch (b. 1913), won 1916 Preakness Stakes
- Cudgel (b. 1914), American Champion Older Male Horse (1918, 1919)
- Milkmaid (b. 1916), American Co-Champion 3-Year-Old Filly (1919), American Champion Older Female Horse (1920)
- Constancy (b. 1917), American Champion Two-Year-Old Filly
- Hallucination (b. 1920), multiple stakes winner including the Autumn and Durham Cups

Financial reverses forced Ross to disband his entire racing operations in 1928. In 1920, he had been appointed president of Blue Bonnets Raceway in Montreal, and although no longer a stable owner after 1928, he held the position until 1931, when he retired to a home in Jamaica.

== Reputation ==
Ross was widely respected for his good manners and sportsmanship, and the Canadian Horse Racing Hall of Fame says that the United States press called him "the best sportsman Canada has ever sent to this country." On one race he put down $20,000 and won back $160,000, but he spotted an irregularity, and although legally he was allowed to keep his winnings, he gave $40,000 back to the bookies. Though he betted frequently, he won as often as he lost, but he is remembered on one occasion for winning $50,000 from a notoriously sharp New Yorker.

The Rosses lived lavishly, even by many of his contemporaries' standards. Princess Patricia of Connaught became engaged to Alexander Ramsay at Ross's fishing lodge on the Bay of St. Anns, Nova Scotia. She was heard to remark that the Rosses lived more royally than royalty. He did keep thirty servants, but many of his supposed trappings were fictional: he had one or sometimes two Rolls-Royces, not eight, and his single private railway car was not an entire private train.

== Bankruptcy ==
There was no doubt that Ross was very generous with his money and spent a fortune on parties, horse racing and yachts, but there was no single cause for the financial downfall that befell him in 1928, when he was down to his final $300 after inheriting $16 million fifteen years earlier. His investments in oil wells in Turner Valley, Alberta and in Mexico had been premature, and he had been exceedingly generous in his philanthropy and to many friends alike. His saddest memory was when his friends to whom he'd been so generous before crossed the street when they saw him coming. Certainly his passion for horse racing cost him dearly, as his only son, Jim Ross, explained: "To own a few mediocre horses is an expensive luxury. To own many good ones demands a truly vast sum of money. In those days a large racing establishment, even a highly successful one, never made back its expenses."

== Family and final years ==
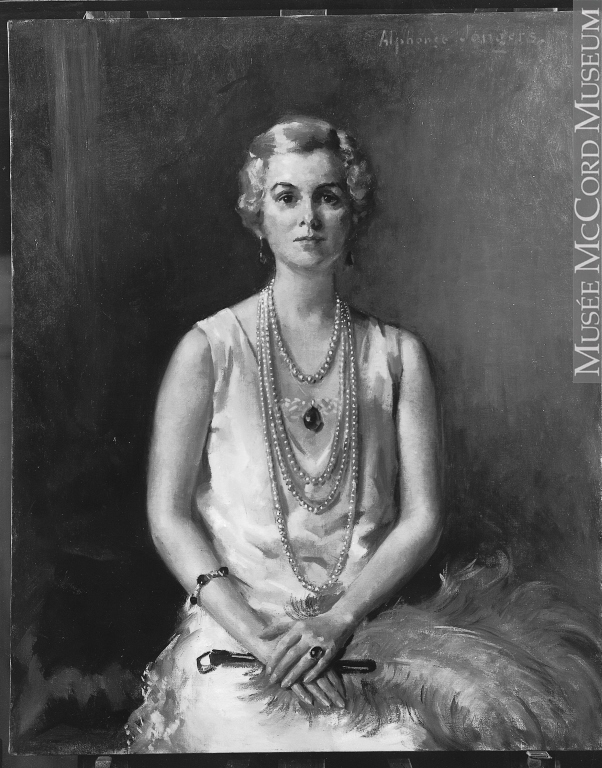
Mrs Ethel (Matthews) Ross, c. 1924

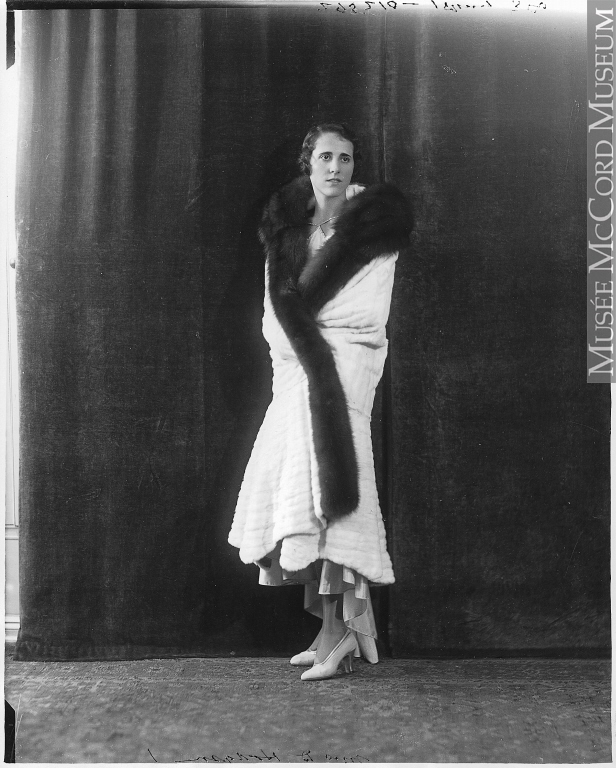
Mrs Hylda (Ross) Hodgson, 1929

In 1902, at St. James Cathedral, Toronto, Ross married his first wife, Etheldine (Ethel) Alice Matthews, daughter of Wilmot Deloui Matthews (1850–1919), one of Toronto's most influential businessmen, and his wife Annie Jane Love. One of Ethel's brothers was married to Annabel Osler, daughter of Sir Edmund Boyd Osler, and the other married the New York City socialite Constance Greening. Ethel's sister lived with the Rosses for some time in Nova Scotia before marrying Bruce MacKinnon and moving to Switzerland. The Rosses were the parents of a son and a daughter:

- James Kenneth Matthews Ross (1903–1966). Known as Jim, he was educated at Bishop's College School. He shared his father's passion for racing and in 1956 published a book entitled Boots and Saddles: The Story of the Fabulous Ross Stable in the Golden Days of Racing. He married Marjorie Arnott Ballantyne (d. 1974), of Montreal. Following her husband's death, she took up residence at the Ritz-Carlton, Montreal. They had one daughter, Joan.
- Hylda Anne May Ross, married Commander Duncan McIntyre Hodgson, RCN, of Montreal, and had three daughters. He was the son of 'Archie' Archibald Arthur Hodgson (1869–1960), the scorer of the winning goal for the Montreal Hockey Club in the first Stanley Cup Final. His mother, Mary, was a first cousin of his father and a daughter and co-heiress of Duncan McIntyre. As mentioned earlier, Duncan Hodgson broke his father-in-law's world record by catching a 997-lb. Bluefin tuna from a rowing boat with rod and line, without a harness.

In 1930, two years after Ross was declared bankrupt, Ethel divorced him. She continued to live in Montreal, remarrying a Boston attorney, which also ended in divorce. Ross was saved from penury by a trust fund. A few years before, the home he had built for himself on Peel Street was valued at over a million dollars but by 1930, with Montreal in a recession following the Wall Street crash, there were no takers for a mansion that size. As an act of charity Ross's friend, the 2nd Lord Shaughnessy, purchased it from him for $51,000 in 1935.

Ross briefly moved into an apartment before leaving for Jamaica, where he met and married in 1931 his new wife, Iris de Lisser, the daughter of a Jamaican planter and sister of H. G. de Lisser. He bought a house on Montego Bay (that after his death was purchased by Lord Beaverbrook) and was made deputy governor of the island. Apart from occasional visits to Montreal, he remained in Jamaica, fishing and sailing until his death at his home in 1951 – happier (he told his confidantes), than when he was rich. In accordance with his wishes, J. K. L. Ross was buried at sea. On its formation in 1976, he was inducted posthumously into the Canadian Horse Racing Hall of Fame.

== See also ==
- List of Bishop's College School alumni
