= Muriel Vanderbilt =

American socialite and thoroughbred racehorse owner/breeder

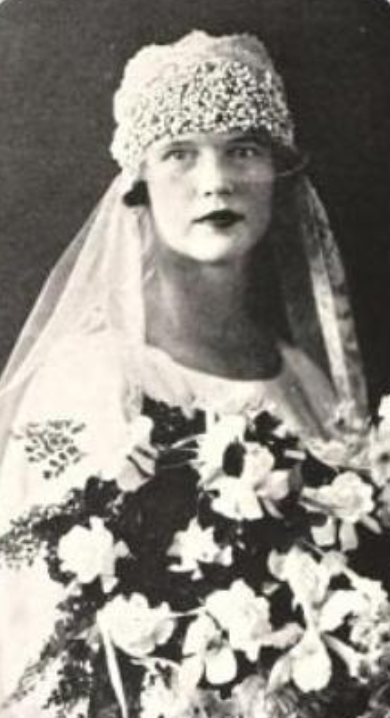
- Vanderbilt in 1925
- Born: November 23, 1900; New York City, U.S.
- Died: February 3, 1972 (aged 71); Florida, U.S.
- Occupations: Heiress, racehorse owner/breeder
- Spouses: Frederic Cameron Church, Jr. (m. 1925; div. 1929) Henry Delafield Phelps (m. 1931; div. 1936) John Payson Adams (m. 1944, died)
- Parent(s): William Kissam Vanderbilt II; Virginia Graham Fair
- Family: Vanderbilt

Muriel Vanderbilt (November 23, 1900 – February 3, 1972) was an American socialite and a thoroughbred racehorse owner/breeder who was a member of the wealthy Vanderbilt family.

== Early life ==
Muriel was born on November 23, 1900, in New York City. She was the daughter of William Kissam Vanderbilt II (1878–1944) and Virginia Graham Fair (1875–1935). Her paternal grandparents were William Kissam Vanderbilt and Alva Erskine Smith. Harold Stirling Vanderbilt was her uncle and Consuelo Vanderbilt, the Duchess of Marlborough until her divorce from Charles Spencer-Churchill, 9th Duke of Marlborough in 1921, was her aunt.

Her maternal grandfather, James Graham Fair, was a United States senator from Nevada who made a large fortune investing in silver mines on the Comstock Lode.

Her parents separated when she was a small girl and she would grow up on Long Island and on the West Coast of the United States where her mother had been born.

== Career ==
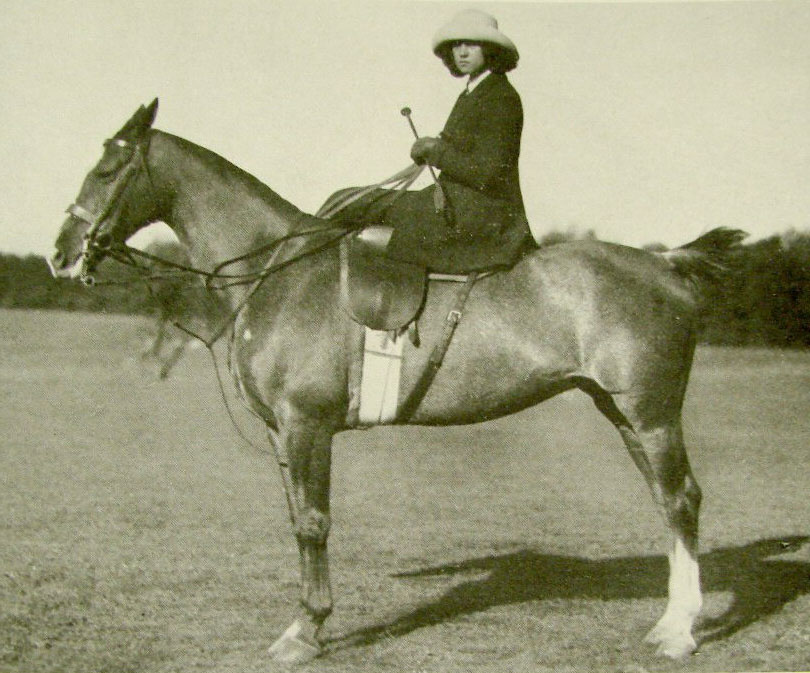
Muriel Vanderbilt in 1915

She shared her father and grandfather Vanderbilt's love of horses. Her mother was also a fan of Thoroughbred horse racing and established Fair Stable that in 1924 and 1925 won back-to-back Horse of the Year honors with Sarazen.

She owned a ranch in Carmel Valley, California, where she built stables and kept thoroughbred racehorses. In 1930, it was reported that she received permission by the Chief of police of Middletown to carry a pistol after riding breeches were stolen from her. In May 1946, Frank B. Porter and his son Paul bought the 1,100 acres (450 ha) farm from Vanderbilt for an estimated $200,000 (equivalent to $3,302,048 in 2025).

In 1947, with her third husband, she bought Edenvale Farms, a horse farm south of San Jose, California, where she bred and raised Thoroughbreds and built her own private training track. Her horse, Miche, won the 1952 Santa Anita Handicap and Desert Trial captured several important West Coast stakes including back-to-back editions of the Ramona Handicap. In 1956, she sold Edenvale Farm to Samuel Hamburger of San Francisco, for $650,000, who in turn sold it to real estate developers for approximately $1 million.

Later in life, Muriel Vanderbilt Adams owned an 80-acre (320,000 m^{2}) horse farm in Marion County, Florida. Bred and trained at her Ocala farm in 1970, Desert Vixen was the most famous horse she ever owned and bred and in 1979 the filly was inducted into the United States' National Museum of Racing and Hall of Fame. The farm is now part of the exclusive gated community, Jumbolair.

== Personal life ==
Muriel Vanderbilt married three times, the first in 1925 to Frederic Cameron Church, Jr., a Boston insurance executive. The marriage ended in divorce in 1929 and in September 1931, she married New Yorker Henry Delafield Phelps (1902–1976). Divorced from her second husband in 1936, she married for a third time in 1944 to John Payson Adams.

Muriel died in Florida on February 3, 1972, at the age of seventy-one.
