= William Kissam Vanderbilt II =

American heir and racing driver (1878–1944)

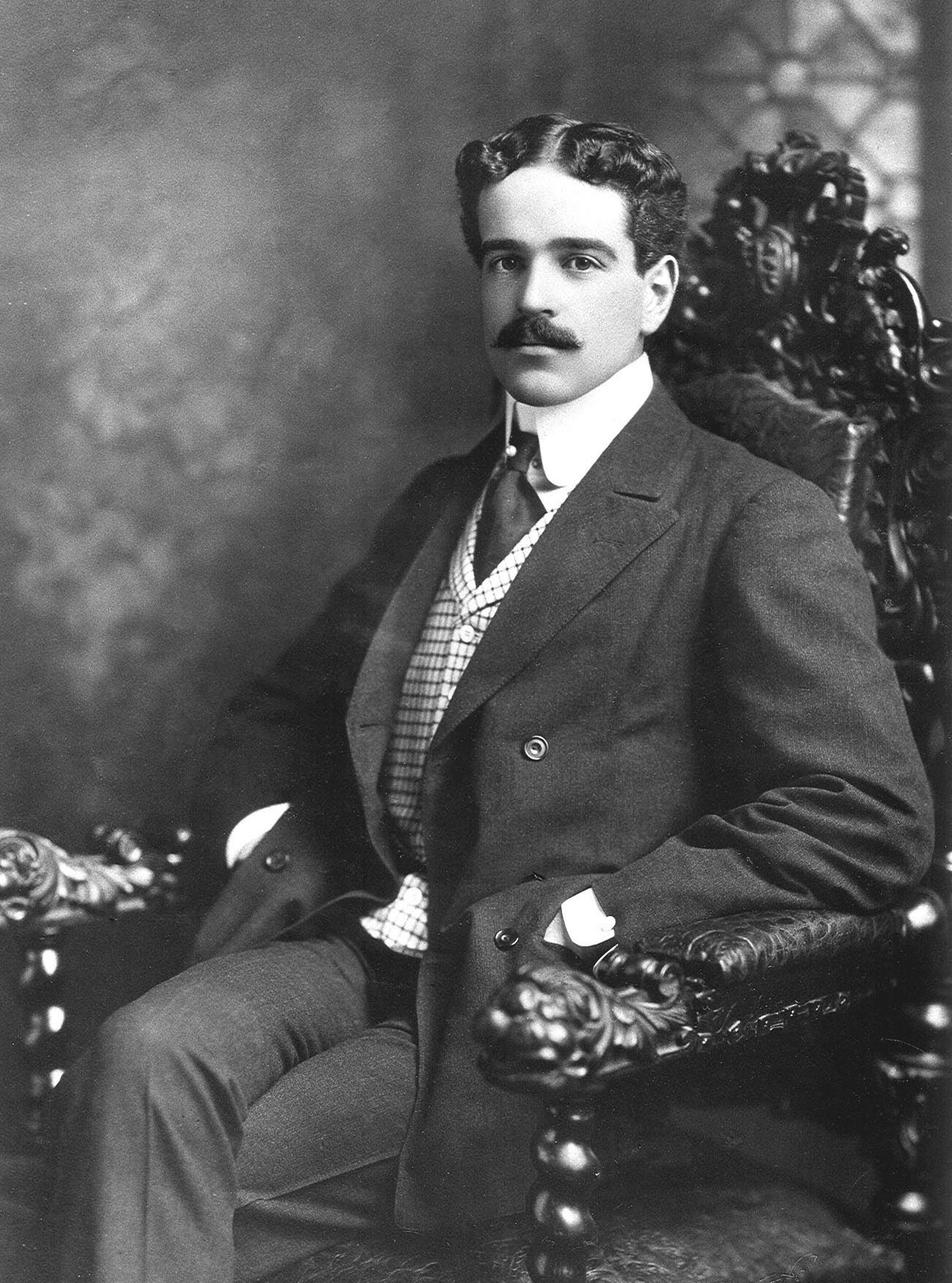
- Vanderbilt photographed by Theodore C. Marceau, 1903
- Born: October 26, 1878; New York City, US
- Died: January 8, 1944 (aged 65); New York City, US
- Burial place: Vanderbilt Family Cemetery and Mausoleum, Staten Island, New York, U.S.
- Education: St. Mark's School; Harvard University
- Spouses: Virginia Graham Fair (m. 1899; div. 1927) Rosamund Lancaster Warburton (m. 1927)
- Children: 3, including Muriel Vanderbilt
- Parent(s): William Kissam Vanderbilt; Alva Erskine Smith

William Kissam Vanderbilt II (October 26, 1878 – January 8, 1944) was an American motor racing enthusiast and yachtsman, and a member of the prominent Vanderbilt family.

== Early life ==
He was born on October 26, 1878, in New York City, the second child and first son of William Kissam Vanderbilt and Alva Erskine Smith. His maternal grandfather was Murray Forbes Smith. Known as Willie K., he was a brother to Harold Stirling Vanderbilt and Consuelo Vanderbilt. Born to a life of luxury, he was raised in Vanderbilt mansions, traveled to Europe frequently, and sailed the globe on yachts owned by his father.

Willie was educated by tutors and at St. Mark's School. He attended Harvard University but dropped out after two years.

== Career ==
While a great part of his life was filled with travel and leisure activities, Willie's father put him to work at the family's New York Central Railroad offices at Grand Central Terminal in Manhattan. As such, in 1905 he joined other Vanderbilts on Fifth Avenue, hiring the architectural firm McKim, Mead & White to design a mansion at 666 Fifth Avenue.

Already extremely wealthy from a trust fund and from his income as president of the New York Central Railroad Company, on his father's death in 1920 Willie inherited a multimillion-dollar fortune.

=== Life as an heir ===
Although he developed an interest in horse racing and yachting, he was particularly fascinated with automobiles. At age 10, during a stay in the south of France he had ridden in a steam-powered tricycle from Beaulieu-sur-Mer the 7 kilometers to Monte Carlo. As a twenty-year-old, in 1898 he ordered a French De Dion-Bouton motor tricycle and had it shipped to New York. Soon, he acquired other motorized vehicles and before long began to infuriate citizens and officials alike as he sped through the towns and villages of Long Island, New York, en route to Idle Hour, his parents' summer estate at Oakdale.

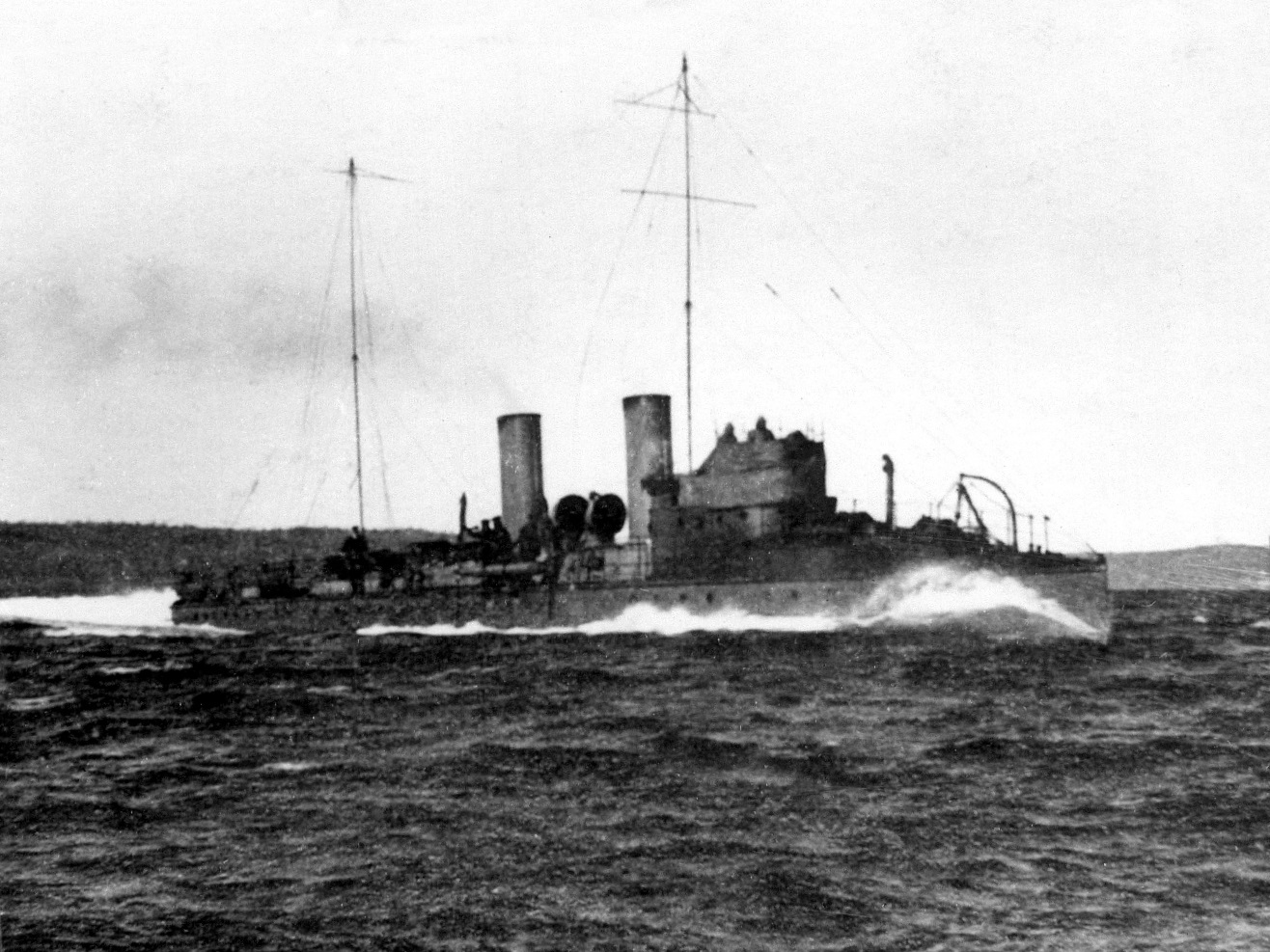
Tarantula (1902)

A skilled sailor, he took part in yacht racing, winning the Sir Thomas Lipton Cup in 1900 with his new 70-foot (21 m) sailing yacht he had named Virginia in honor of his new bride. In 1902, Vanderbilt began construction on his own country place at Lake Success on Long Island that he named "Deepdale." In 1903 he bought Tarantula, the first turbine-powered steam yacht in the World.

However, sailing took second place to his enthusiasm for fast cars. In 1904, Willie set a new land speed record of 92.30 mph (148.54 km/h) in a Mercedes-Benz at the Daytona Beach Road Course at Ormond Beach, Florida. That same year, he launched the Vanderbilt Cup, the first major trophy in American auto racing. An international event, designed to spur American manufacturers into racing, the race's large cash prize drew the top drivers and their vehicles from across the Atlantic Ocean who had competed in Europe's Gordon Bennett Cup. Held at a course set out in Nassau County on Long Island, New York, the race drew large crowds hoping to see an American car defeat the mighty European vehicles. However, a French Panhard vehicle won the race and fans would have to wait until 1908 when 23-year-old George Robertson of Garden City, New York, became the first American to win the Vanderbilt Cup.

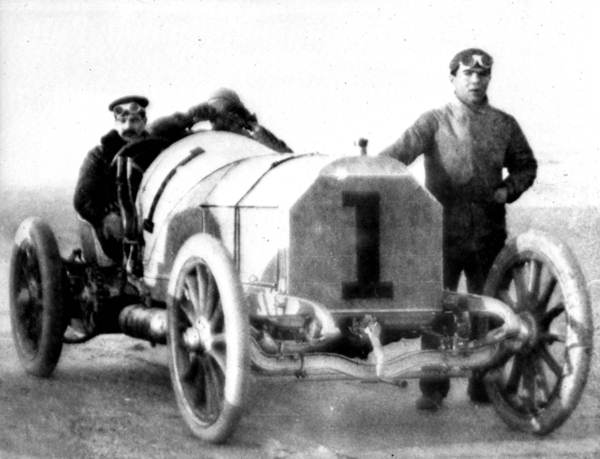
Vanderbilt and his powerful Mercedes-Benz at Daytona (1904). Courtesy Florida Photographic Collection

The Vanderbilt Cup auto races repeatedly had crowd control problems and at the 1906 race a spectator was killed. Seeing the potential to solve the safety issue as well as improve attendance to his race, and with encouragement from AAA official A. R. Pardington, Vanderbilt formed a corporation to build the Long Island Motor Parkway, one of the country's first modern paved parkways that could not only be used for the race but would open up Long Island for easy access and economic development. Construction began in 1907 of the multimillion-dollar toll highway that was to run from the Kissena Corridor in Queens County over numerous bridges and overpasses to Lake Ronkonkoma, a distance of 48 miles (77 km). However, the toll road was never able to generate sustainable profits and in 1938 it was formally ceded to the county governments in lieu of the $80,000 due in back taxes.

His new high-speed road complemented a train service that allowed a rapid exit from Manhattan. Becoming the first suburban automobile commuter, in 1910 Willie began work on the much more elaborate and costly "Eagle's Nest" estate at Centerport, Long Island. An avid collector of natural history and marine specimens as well as other anthropological objects, he traveled extensively aboard his yacht as well as overland to numerous destinations around the globe. He acquired a vast array of artifacts for his collection during his well-documented travels and after service with the United States Navy during World War I, he published a book titled "A Trip Through Sicily, Tunisia, Algeria, and Southern France." A few years later, he engaged William Belanske, an artist from the American Museum of Natural History to take part with him in a scientific voyage to the Galapagos Islands. By 1922, Vanderbilt had commissioned the construction of a single-story building on his Long Island estate to serve as a public museum, and less than a decade later a second story was added on to accommodate the growing collection. William Belanske, who had accompanied Vanderbilt on his Galapagos voyage, was employed as the full-time curator of this museum.

=== Military service ===
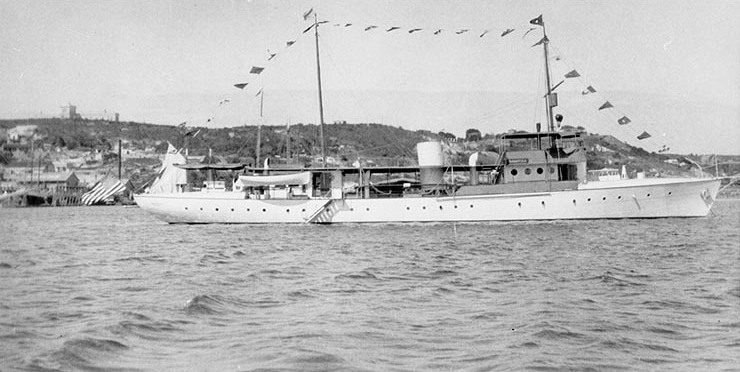
USS Tarantula (1913)

In 1913, Vanderbilt traded in his steam turbine yacht Tarantula for a new motor yacht, also named Tarantula. On May 9, 1917, the United States Navy commissioned the second Tarantula at Brooklyn Navy Yard as a patrol boat, with the hull number SP-124, and appointed Lieutenant Vanderbilt as its commander. The Navy chartered the yacht from him for the duration of the war. He was assigned to patrol duty in the waters of the 3rd Naval District, and escorted convoys in waters off New York and New Jersey. On October 1, 1917, he was released from active duty and given a temporary leave of absence to resume his duties of vice-president of the New York Central Railroad. A few months later, he was elected president of the New York Central Railroad and acted in this capacity for the remainder of the war.

After the war, Vanderbilt was promoted to the rank of lieutenant commander in the Naval Reserve on May 17, 1921. He remained in the Naval Reserve until he was transferred to the Honorary Retired List on January 1, 1941, for physical disability.

=== Residences ===
In 1925, he traded the luxury yacht Eagle for ownership of Fisher Island, Florida, a place he used as a winter residence. He built a mansion complete with docking facilities for his yacht, a seaplane hangar, tennis courts, swimming pool, and an eleven-hole golf course. This home was called Alva Base and the architect was Maurice Fatio. In addition to this property, and his Long Island estate, Eagle's Nest, which was designed by Warren & Wetmore, Vanderbilt also owned a farm in Tennessee and Kedgwick Lodge, a hunting lodge designed for his father by architect Stanford White, on the Restigouche River in New Brunswick, Canada.

== Personal life and death ==
In 1899, Vanderbilt married Virginia Graham Fair (1875–1935), a wealthy heiress whose father, James Graham Fair, had made a fortune in mining the famous Comstock Lode. They spent their honeymoon at the Idle Hour estate but disaster struck when fire broke out and the mansion burned to the ground. Before their separation and divorce, Vanderbilt and his wife had a son and two daughters, the younger of whom was named for his sister:

- Muriel Vanderbilt (1900–1972), who married three times, the first in 1925 to Frederic Cameron Church, Jr. She later married Henry Delafield Phelps and John Payson Adams.
- Consuelo Vanderbilt (1903–2011) who first married Earl E. T. Smith (1903–1991), the U.S. Ambassador to Cuba, in 1926. They divorced in 1935 and she married Henry Gassaway Davis III (1902–1984), who was and the grandson of Henry G. Davis and recently divorced from her cousin, Grace Vanderbilt. They divorced in 1940 and she married William John Warburton III (1895–1979) in 1941. They divorced in 1946 and in 1951, she married Noble Clarkson Earl Jr. (1900–1969).
- William Kissam Vanderbilt III (1907–1933), who inherited his father's love of fast cars and exotic travel, was killed in an automobile accident in South Carolina while driving home to New York City from his father's Florida estate.

The Vanderbilts separated after ten years of marriage but did not formally divorce until 1927 when he wanted to remarry. Divorce proceedings were handled by his New York lawyers while he and Rosamund Lancaster Warburton (1897–1947), a former wife of Barclay Harding Warburton II and an heir to the John Wanamaker department store fortune, waited discreetly away from the media at a home in the Parisian suburb of Passy, France. When the divorce was final, the couple were married at the Hotel de Ville (city hall) in Paris on September 5, 1927. Vanderbilt became a legal stepfather to Barclay Harding Warburton III once they wed.

Vanderbilt died on January 8, 1944, of a heart ailment. He was interred in the Vanderbilt Family Cemetery and Mausoleum on Staten Island, New York.

=== Wealth ===
After his father died in 1920, Vanderbilt's share of the estate was valued around $21,253,000, after the deduction of taxes and debts.

In 1935 he was named as a co-executor of the will of his first wife, Virginia Fair Vanderbilt; despite their divorce in 1927, the Will had been executed on 5 June 1930. Vanderbilt did not inherit any of her $7,000,000 fortune, though the will established several trust funds which provided for annuities of $150,000 to their daughter Consuelo Vanderbilt Smith, $75,000 to Muriel Vanderbilt Phelps and $50,000 to their son William K. Vanderbilt III (though he had predeceased his mother).

After his own death in 1944, newspaper articles reported that the preliminary valuation of his gross estate was about $36,323,000.

Later reports gave a net figure of $35,815,614, from which were deducted about $18,845,000 in federal estate taxes and $5,600,000 in New York estate taxes, as well as $1.6 million in charitable requests, $1,286,000 in administration and funeral expenses, and $220,000 in debts. By 1945 his widow had applied for a reduction in the valuation of his estate, claiming that only $5,000,000 remained from her late husband's fortune after the payment of state and federal income taxes. The will bequeathed his Long Island estate Eagle's Nest and a $2,000,000 trust fund to Suffolk County, New York to create a museum.

He provided a life interest in his residuary estate to his second wife, after which it would be divided into 18 shares, which were to be allocated among his surviving descendants:

- A life interest in 9 shares (or 50%) to his daughter Muriel Vanderbilt Phelps; after her death, 5 of these shares to be transferred to the Eagle's Nest Park Maintenance Fund, and the remaining 4 shares to vest into the ownership of any children she might have, or failing this, to the children of her sister Consuelo;
- 2 shares each to his granddaughters Iris Smith and Virginia Smith (daughters of Consuelo Vanderbilt Smith);
- 3 shares to his step-daughter Rosemary Warburton Gaynor; and,
- 2 shares to his step-son Barclay K. Warburton III

=== Legacy ===
In 1931, Vanderbilt ordered the 264-foot diesel yacht Alva from the Krupp Germaniawerft in Kiel, Germany. The Alva was donated by Vanderbilt to the U.S. Navy on November 4, 1941. The Alva was converted to a gunboat and commissioned as the USS Plymouth (PG-57) on December 29, 1941. The Plymouth was primarily employed as a convoy escort on the East Coast and in the Caribbean and was sunk by a torpedo from a German U-boat on August 5, 1943, at 21.39 with the loss of 95.

By the 1940s, Vanderbilt had organized his will so that, upon his death, the Eagle's Nest property along with a $2 million upkeep fund would be given to Suffolk County, New York, to serve as a public museum. Since 1950, the site has operated as the Suffolk County Vanderbilt Museum.

In 2025, Vanderbilt was inducted into the Motorsports Hall of Fame of America.
