= USS Tarantula (SP-124) =

Former yacht and US Navy patrol boat (1912–1918)

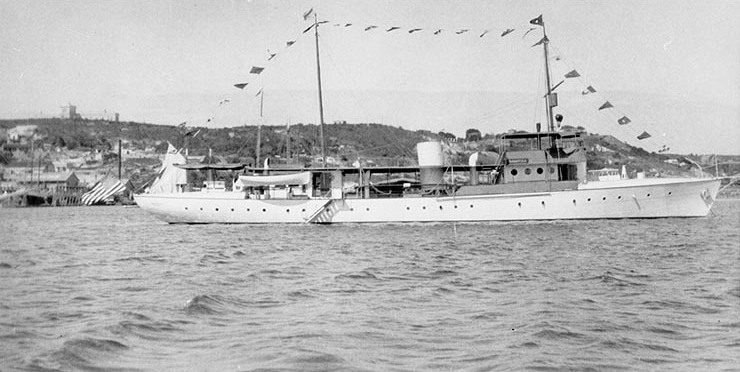
- USS Tarantula dressed overall

History

United States
- Name: USS Tarantula
- Namesake: tarantula
- Owner: WK Vanderbilt
- Port of registry: New York
- Builder: George Lawley & Son, Neponset
- Launched: 1912
- Completed: 1913
- Acquired: 25 April 1917
- Identification: US official number 210956; 1913: code letters LCTH; 1917: hull symbol SP-124
- Fate: Sank after collision, 28 October 1918

General characteristics
- Type: motor yacht
- Tonnage: 159 GRT, 90 NRT
- Displacement: 159.97 long tons (162.54 t)
- Length: 128 ft 9 in (39.24 m) overall; 116.6 ft (35.5 m) registered
- Beam: 19.3 ft (5.9 m)
- Draft: 9 ft (2.7 m)
- Depth: 10.7 ft (3.3 m)
- Speed: 14 kn (26 km/h)
- Armament: 2 × 6-pounder guns; 2 × .303 in (7.7 mm) machine guns

USS Tarantula (SP-124) was motor yacht that was converted into a United States Navy patrol boat. She was named after the tarantula.

== East Coast assignment ==
Tarantula was built as a motor yacht in 1912 at Neponset, Boston, by George Lawley & Son. She was acquired by the US Navy on 25 April 1917 from WK Vanderbilt of New York City. Assigned to section patrol in the 3rd Naval District in World War I, Tarantula patrolled coastal waters of Connecticut, New York, and New Jersey until October 1918.

== Collision and sinking ==
On 28 October 1918, Tarantula sank about 8 mi (13 km) southwest of the Fire Island lightship after colliding with the Royal Holland Lloyd steamship Frisia. Her name was subsequently struck from the Naval Vessel Register.

Tarantula′s owner subsequently was paid $75,000 to cover her value.
