= Bubba Cascio =

American race horse trainer (1932–2022)

C.W. "Bubba" Cascio
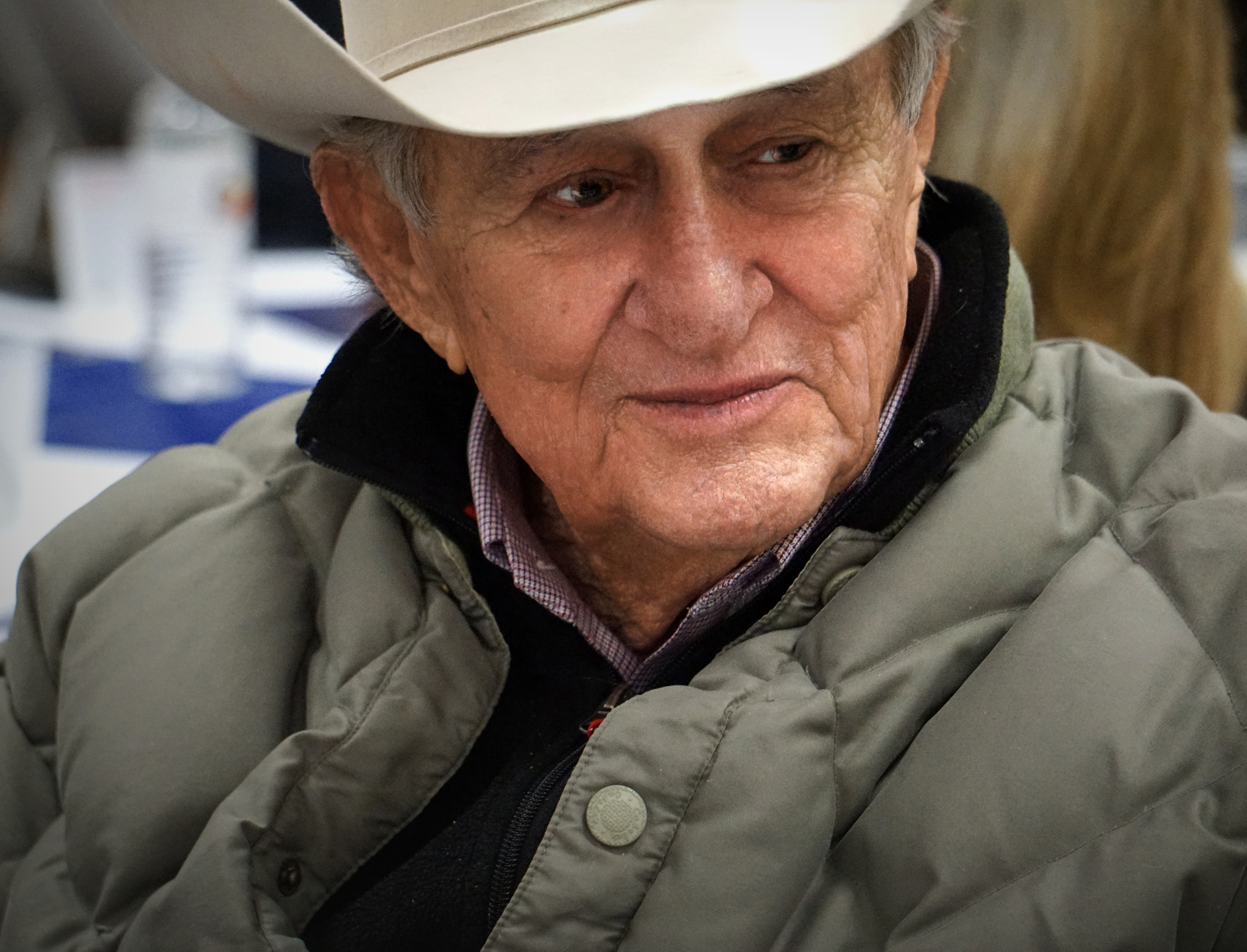

Personal information
- Native name: Charles William Cascio
- Born: August 7, 1932 Houston, Texas, U.S.
- Died: November 2, 2022 (aged 90)
- Occupation: Horse trainer
- Spouse: Judy Severinsen Cascio

Horse racing career
- Sport: Horse racing

Honours
- Two-time winner of the All American Futurity (1968, 1970); Texas Racing Hall of Fame (2002); American Quarter Horse Hall of Fame (2008); Texas Cowboy Hall of Fame (2016)

Significant horses
- Dash For Cash, Three Oh's, Rocket Wrangler, Dashingly, Justanold Love

Charles William Cascio (August 7, 1932 – November 2, 2022), better known as Bubba Cascio or C. W. Cascio, was an American race horse trainer, and two-time winner of the All American Futurity, having won in 1968 with Three Oh's, and again in 1970 with Rocket Wrangler. He also trained Dash For Cash, twice Champion of Champions winner sired by Rocket Wrangler. In 2002, Cascio was inducted into the Texas Racing Hall of Fame, and in 2008, into the American Quarter Horse Hall of Fame. He has been referred to as a "Texas racing legend". In 2016, he was inducted into the Texas Cowboy Hall of Fame as "one of the most successful trainers in the horse racing industry for over 40 years."

Cascio died on November 2, 2022, at the age of 90.

== Early life ==
Bubba Cascio was born in Houston, Texas into a life of horse racing. His uncle managed Epsom Downs, located on Jensen Drive in northeast Harris County, until parimutuel racing became illegal in Texas in 1937. His father Jake Cascio (1907–1988) was a highly regarded racehorse trainer throughout the Southwest. Bubba began his lifelong career in horse racing at age 10 when he hot-walked horses for racehorse trainer Will McKown. A few years later he was galloping racehorses, and by age 16 was a jockey for approximately three years during which time he outgrew the required weight limit. While still in his teens, Bubba worked for Lester Goodson's J3 Ranch in Magnolia, Texas. He said, "My dad was training race horses and I was riding ‘em." When he became too heavy to jockey, he started riding cutting horses under the tutelage of his idol Matlock Rose who, at the time, also worked for J3 Ranch training AQHA performance horses.

== Career ==
Cascio credits Lester Goodson as having been a positive influence in his life and career stating that "[Goodson] believed in me, got me connections and recommended me to people.” Cascio also recalled a time in 1956 when he went with Goodson to the White House to present two American Quarter Horses to President Eisenhower. Cascio rode one of them in a reining pattern on the White House lawn. The horses' names were Doodle De Do and Sporty Miss.

Cascio trained many winning race horses but among the most notable are the two All American Futurity winners Three Oh's and Rocket Wrangler, and twice Champion of Champions winner Dash For Cash, an American Quarter Horse Hall of Fame inductee.
