= Moonist =

American Quarter Horse racehorse

- Sire: Separatist
- Grandsire: Chicks Beduino
- Dam: Your First Moon
- Damsire: First Down Dash
- Sex: Gelding
- Foaled: January 28, 2011
- Country: United States
- Colour: Bay
- Breeder: Vessels Stallion Farm
- Owner: Ron Hartley
- Trainer: John Cooper
- Record: 34: 24–4–1
- Earnings: $878,468

Major wins
- El Primero Del Ano Derby (2014); Governors Cup Derby (2014); Golden State Derby (2014); Kaweah Bar Handicap(2015); Spencer L. Childers California Breeders Championship (2015); Go Man Go Handicap (2015); Robert L. Boniface Los Alamitos Invitational Championship (2015); Los Alamitos Winter Championship (2016)

Awards
- AQHA Champion three-year-old (2014); AQHA Champion aged horse (2015)

Moonist (28 January 2011 – 21 June 2016) was an American Quarter Horse who was known for winning multiple Grade I races, including two Champion of Champion qualifying races. He was the American Quarter Horse Association (AQHA) Champion three-year-old of 2014 and Champion aged horse of 2015. In 2016, Moonist was undefeated in four starts before dying due to a bout of colic.

== Background ==
Moonist was bred by Vessel Stallion Farm of Bonsall California. He was sired by Separatist out of the First Down Dash mare Your First Moon, herself a champion. He was sold as a yearling at the 2012 Los Alamitos Equine Sale for $21,500 to Ron Hartley of Canyon Lake, California and trained by John Cooper. He was based at Los Alamitos Race Course, where he made all his starts.

== Career ==
=== 2013: 2-year-old-season ===
Moonist lost his first two starts, then won for the first time on June 21, 2013. He next won the Governor's Cup Futurity Trial on July 13 before placing second in the Governor's Cup Futurity on July 27. This was followed by two fifth place finishes in the Breeders' Futurity Trial and the Golden State Juvenile Invitational Trial before he rebounded with a win in the Golden State Juvenile Invitational. At the end of his two-year-old season, he placed fourth in the Los Alamitos Two Million Futurity Trial before winning the Los Alamitos Juvenile Invitational. He finished the year with a record of four wins and two seconds from ten starts.

=== 2014: 3-year-old-season ===
Moonist started his three-year-old campaign by winning the Los Alamitos Winter Derby Trial on January 25, but finished fourth in the Grade I Los Alamitos Winter Derby. He then won the next eight straight races, including the G1 Golden State Derby on August 24 and two G3 events, the El Primero Del Ano Derby and Governors Cup Derby. His nine wins were the most of any Quarter Horse in 2014 and led to Moonist being named the AQHA champion three-year-old.

=== 2015: 4-year-old-season ===
Moonist started the year by winning the Los Alamitos Winter Championship Trial on January 25, 2015 to extend his winning streak to nine. His qualifying time of 19.74 for 400 yards was the fastest in the Trials. Favored in the actual Los Alamitos Winter Championship on February 15, he was upset by Matabari, who had been the champion three-year-old filly of 2013 before losing her next five starts.

Moonist then won three straight races, including the G3 Kaweah Bar Handicap on May 2. On July 5, he was the 1-10 favorite in the G1 Vessels Maturity but finished third to Far Niente and Well and Good after a poor break. "He was trying to beat the doors and he false fired," said jockey Cesar De Alba. "He's done that before. He was moving back right when they kicked it and otherwise he's gone. He was coming on strong. Other than the false break he ran his race. He would have been 2nd with another step."

On July 25, Moonist rebounded with a win in the G1 Spencer L. Childers California Breeders Championship, winning by 2 1/2 lengths over Well and Good. "Moonist is a once in a lifetime type of a horse," said Hartley. "Without a doubt, he's just something very special. He always has his focus on running. He's very calm and he knows his business."

Moonist earned his tenth stakes victory and third G1 win in the Go Man Go Handicap on September 25, beating Separate Interest by 1 1/4 lengths. He became only the 13th horse to earn 10 stake wins at Los Alamitos in its 64-year history. The win also earned Moonist a berth in the Champion of Champions, to be held at the end of the year. He followed up with a wire-to-wire victory in the G1 Robert L. Boniface Los Alamitos Invitational Championship on October 17, defeating Far Niente by half a length.

The most prestigious race in Quarter Horse racing for older horses is the Champion of Champions. The 2015 renewal, held on December 15, featured a highly anticipated match-up between the top three-year-old, Heza Dasha Fire, and Moonist, the top older horse in the country. Heza Dasha Fire took the lead shortly after the break and held off Moonist to win by 1 1/4 lengths. "I can’t knock that trip," said Cooper. "We got outrun. I can live with it. That horse of Flores (Heza Dasha Fire) just went 440 yards in :21.20. There’s no shame in running second to a horse like that. That horse is just a fast horse and being younger didn't hurt him."

Moonist finished the year with seven wins, two seconds and a third from ten starts and was named the AQHA champion aged horse of 2015.

=== 2016: 5-year-old-season ===
Moonist started the year by winning the Los Alamitos Winter Trial on January 24, 2016, defeating Heza Dasha Fire, who had just been named the 2015 World Champion Quarter Horse. In the Los Alamitos Winter Championship on February 14, he faced off once again with Heza Dasha Fire and again triumphed in a time of 19.49 seconds for 400 yards.

Moonist was given a brief layoff, then returned with a "decisive" win in an allowance race on May 20, posting a time :17.466 seconds for 350 yards. On June 12, Moonist was the fastest qualifier in the Vessels Maturity Trials, completing the 400 yard race in :19.486. "Hopefully, he pulls up well after this race," said Cooper. "That's always the next worry after they run. You don't have to do much with the good ones. We'll pony him a little bit and just take it real easy with him."

== Death ==
Moonist started to feel unwell on the afternoon of June 21 and quickly deteriorated from what turned out to be a bout of colic. Emergency surgery found bleeding in his organs that could not be helped. To prevent further suffering, Moonist was euthanized that evening. It was also only 9 days after his last victory in the Vessels Maturity Trial.

There was a large outpouring from his fans. "My grandson was telling me about all the messages he was getting and seeing on social media about Moonist and it's quite overwhelming and touching to see how much this horse was liked and enjoyed by so many people," said Hartley. "Moonist has been a member of our family and loved by so many in the horse racing family as well. Bonnie Vessels, who bred Moonist, was one of the first call me this morning after she heard the news. We've heard from so many people from all over the country. It's been touching. There'll never be another one like him for me. He’s one in two million."

He finished his career with 24 wins, including 12 stakes victories, from 34 starts and earnings of $878,468.

== Pedigree ==
Pedigree of Moonist (USA), bay gelding, 2011
Sire Separatist (USA) 1997	Chicks Beduino (USA); 1984	Beduino (TB)	Romany Royal
Sire Separatist (USA) 1997	Chicks Beduino (USA); 1984	Beduino (TB)	Jo-Ann-Cat
Sire Separatist (USA) 1997	Chicks Beduino (USA); 1984	A Classy Chick	Chicks Deck
Sire Separatist (USA) 1997	Chicks Beduino (USA); 1984	A Classy Chick	Mayshego
Sire Separatist (USA) 1997	Separate Ways (USA); 1978	Hempen (TB)	Indian Hemp
Sire Separatist (USA) 1997	Separate Ways (USA); 1978	Hempen (TB)	Serra
Sire Separatist (USA) 1997	Separate Ways (USA); 1978	Jet Together	Jet Deck
Sire Separatist (USA) 1997	Separate Ways (USA); 1978	Jet Together	Go Together
Dam Your First Moon (USA) 1999	First Down Dash (USA); 1984	Dash For Cash	Rocket Wrangler
Dam Your First Moon (USA) 1999	First Down Dash (USA); 1984	Dash For Cash	Find A Buyer (TB)
Dam Your First Moon (USA) 1999	First Down Dash (USA); 1984	First Prize Rose	Gallant Jet
Dam Your First Moon (USA) 1999	First Down Dash (USA); 1984	First Prize Rose	Rose Bug
Dam Your First Moon (USA) 1999	Moon Arisen (USA); 1991	Beduino (TB)	Romany Royal
Dam Your First Moon (USA) 1999	Moon Arisen (USA); 1991	Beduino (TB)	Jo-Ann-Cat
Dam Your First Moon (USA) 1999	Moon Arisen (USA); 1991	Goin For Cash	Dash For Cash
Dam Your First Moon (USA) 1999	Moon Arisen (USA); 1991	Goin For Cash	Ought To Go

- Moonist was inbred 3 × 3 to Beduino, meaning that this stallion appears twice in the third generation of his pedigree. He was also inbred 3 × 4 to Dash For Cash.
