= Easy Date =

Quarter Horse racehorse and broodmare

- Breed: Quarter Horse
- Discipline: Racing
- Sire: Easy Jet
- Grandsire: Jet Deck
- Dam: Spot Cash (TB)
- Maternal grandsire: Roman Sandal
- Sex: Mare
- Foaled: 1972
- Country: United States
- Color: Bay

Record
- 29-22-4-0

Earnings
- $849,710.00

Major wins
- 1975 Rainbow Derby; 1975 Golden State Derby; 1974 All American Futurity (1975) Champion of Champions

Awards
- AQHA Superior Race Horse; 1974 AQHA Champion Two-Year-Old Quarter Running Filly; 1975 World Champion Quarter Running Horse

Honors
- American Quarter Horse Hall of Fame

Easy Date (born 1972) was an outstanding Quarter Horse racehorse and broodmare.

== Life ==
Easy Date was a 1972 bay daughter of American Quarter Horse Association (or AQHA) Hall of Fame member Easy Jet out of a Thoroughbred mare named Spot Cash. Spot Cash was a descendant of Teddy and Man o' War.

== Racing career ==
Easy Date won the 1974 All American Futurity as well as the 1975 Rainbow Derby and the 1975 Golden State Derby. She was named AQHA World Champion Quarter Running Horse in 1975, and the 1974 AQHA Champion Quarter Running Two-Year-Old Filly. During her race career, she won 22 races and $849,710.00 in earnings along with an AQHA Superior Race Horse award.

== Breeding record and honors ==
After the end of Easy Date's racing career, she was the mother of eleven foals, eight of whom earned their Race Register of Merit with the AQHA. Three of her foals won stakes races and one was a Superior Race Horse award winner. Her offspring earned a total of $101,931.00 on the racetrack.

Easy Date was inducted into the AQHA Hall of Fame in 2002.

== Pedigree ==
Top Deck (TB)
Moon Deck
Moonlight Night
Jet Deck
Barred
Miss Night Bar
Belle of Midnight
Easy Jet
Percentage (TB)
Three Bars (TB)
Myrtle Dee (TB)
Lena's Bar (TB)
Gray Dream (TB)
Lena Valenti (TB)
Perhobo (TB)
Easy Date
*Sir Gallahd III (TB)
Roman (TB)
Buckup (TB)
Roman Sandal (TB)
The Porter (TB)
Alaport (TB)
Alouette (TB)
Spot Cash (TB)
Teddys Comet (TB)
Warmonger (TB)
War Hysteria (TB)
Les Price (TB)
By Pass (TB)
Paso Grande (TB)
Grande Duchesse (TB)
