= G. R. Carter =

American jockey

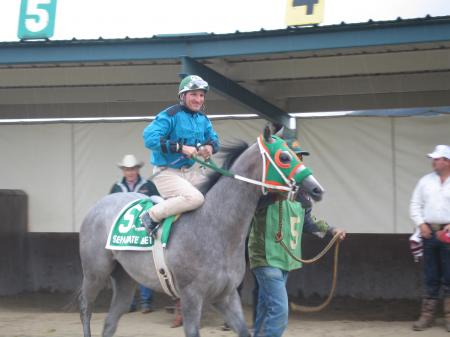
- G. R. Carter on Separate Bet

Personal information
- Born: February 6, 1968 (age 58) Pawhuska, Oklahoma, U.S.
- Occupation: Jockey

Horse racing career
- Sport: Horse racing
- Career wins: 4,001

Major racing wins
All American Derby (1997)
All American Futurity (1998, 2008)
Additional races
All American Gold Cup (1995)
Bank of America Challenge Championship (2000)
Bayer Legend Derby Challenge Championship(1997, 2005)
Black/Gold Futurity (2002)
Blue Ribbon Derby (1995, 1998)
Blue Ribbon Futurity (1997, 2007)
Bob Moore Memorial Stakes (2018)
Championship at Sunland Park (2005)
Dash For Cash Derby (1997, 2006, 2007)
Dash For Cash Futurity (2001, 2011)
Decketta Stakes (1998, 2008, 2015)
Eastex Handicap (2004, 2006, 2011, 2013)
Ed Burke Million Futurity (2006)
El Primero Ano Derby (2010)
Firecracker Futurity (2010)
Ford Juvenile Challenge Championship (1995)
Go Man Go Handicap (2006)
Golden State Futurity (2002, 2003, 2018)
Governor's Cup Derby (2007,2012)
Governor's Cup Futurity (2006)
Harrah's Entertainment Derby (2009)
Heritage Place Derby
(1989, 1998, 2004, 2007)
Heritage Place Futurity
(1988, 1989, 1994, 1997, 2002)
Higheasterjet Handicap (2012, 2014)
Hobbs America Futurity (2009, 2011, 2012)
Kansas Derby (2007)
Kansas Futurity (2007)
Kansas Jackpot Derby (2005)
Kansas Jackpot Futurity (2005, 2009)
Kindergarten Futurity (1993)
La Fiesta Derby (2018)
Lazy E Derby (1996)
Leo Stakes (1999, 2006, 2011, 2015)
Los Alamitos Invitational Championship (1998)
Los Alamitos Super Derby (2003, 2004)
Los Alamitos Two Million Futurity (2002, 2005, 2018)
Los Alamitos Winter Derby (2004, 2010)
Merial Distaff Challenge Championship (2012)
Mildred Vessels Memorial Handicap
(1993, 2003)
Mile High Derby (2002)
Namehimastreaker New Mexico Classic Quarterhorse Championship (2012)
Oklahoma Derby (1989, 2007, 2009)
Oklahoma Futurity (1992)
Oklahoma Horsemen's Association Derby
(2000, 2003)
Oklahoma Horsemen's Association Futurity (2004)
PCQHA Breeders Futurity (2004)
PCQHA Breeders Derby (2009)
Rainbow Derby (1998, 2015)
Rainbow Futurity (1996, 2012)
Red Cell Distance Challenge Championship
(1996, 2003, 2010)
Refrigerator Handicap (2006, 2011)
Remington Park Derby
(1998, 2004, 2007, 2014)
Remington Park Distance Handicap
(1998, 1999, 2011)
Remington Park Futurity
(1997, 2001, 2007, 2009, 2011, 2012)
Remington Park Invitational Championship (2007, 2011, 2015)
Ruidoso Derby (2011)
Ruidoso Futurity (2004)
Shue Fly Stakes (2003, 2012)
Sooner State Stakes
(1996, 2001, 2005, 2006, 2007, 2008, 2011)
Southern California Derby (1995)
Speedhorse Gold & Silver Cup Derby
(2002, 2002, 2005, 2014)
Speedhorse Gold & Silver Cup Futurity
(2002, 2008, 2013)
Spencer Childers California Breeders Championship (2004, 2005, 2006)
Sunland Park Winter Derby
(2003, 2004, 2007)
Sunland Park Winter Futurity (2005)
Texas Classic Derby
(1997, 2006, 2009, 2016, 2017)
Texas Classic Futurity (2006,)
Vessels Maturity (2005, 2006))
West Texas Derby (2015)
West Texas Futurity (2008)
West Texas Maturity (2007)
Zia Derby (1997, 2004, 2018)

Racing awards
- AQHA World Champion Jockey (1993, 1997, 2003, 2004, 2005, 2006, 2007, 2008, 2011, 2012) APHA World Champion Jockey (1997, 1998, 2000, 2002, 2004, 2005, 2007, 2010, 2011, 2012) Remington Park Horse Racing Hall of Fame; Ruidoso Downs Race Horse Hall of Fame (2008); Lone Star Park Racing Hall of Fame (2017); Sam Thompson Memorial Jockey Award (2013); Oklahoma Quarter Horse Hall of Fame (2016); American Quarter Horse Hall of Fame (2023)

Significant horses
- Apolltical Chad, Barbs Bounce, Be A Bono, Bigg Daddy, Carters Cookie, Country Chicks Man, Dashin Is Easy, Dashing Perfection, De Passem Okey, Falling In Loveagain, Fast First Prize, Fast Prize Zoom, FDD Dynasty, First Place Queen, First Valiant Sign, Flash and Roll, Fredaville, Hez Ramblin Man, Got Country Grip, Jess Cuervo, Jess Good Candy, Jess Zoomin, Llano Teller, Lota PYC, Louisiana Senator, Mighy B Valiant, Noblesse Six, PYC Paint Your Wagon, Skuze Pleeze, Stolis Winner, Terrific Synergy, Valiant Hero
- Updated on August 22, 2013

George Robert "G. R." Carter Jr. (born February 6, 1968) is a retired professional American Quarter Horse jockey. On June 1, 2008, he became the all-time leading money-earning jockey in American Quarter Horse racing history surpassing the previous record of $41,405,207 in mount earnings. He continued to add to the record and retired with $75,799,513 in mount earnings. On July 6, 2013, Carter became the jockey with the most mounts in AQHA racing history after he piloted his 22,294th horse. Carter finished his career with 25,586 mounts on American Quarter Horses. On May 23, 2014, Carter became the all-time leader in wins aboard American Quarter Horses when he won his 3,632nd race passing Alvin "Bubba" Brossette. His final tally was 4,001 wins.

Carter has been named the American Quarter Horse Association (AQHA) World Champion Jockey ten times in his career including six years consecutively from 2003 to 2008. No other jockey has won more than five titles.

== Early life ==
Carter has Osage heritage and grew up in Pawhuska, Oklahoma. As a teenager, he was a competitive gymnast and won the state championship. During his Senior year at Pawhuska High School, Carter won the Class A State Wrestling Championship at 108 pounds. Growing up, Carter was involved in ranching and rodeos, which helped develop his love of horses. At age 14, he began galloping race horses for a local trainer to help fund his rodeo participation. Throughout his Senior year in high school, he would occasionally ride races on the weekends at Blue Ribbon Downs and Eureka Downs.

== Professional career ==
After graduating from high school in 1986, Carter moved to Sallisaw, Oklahoma to become a full-time jockey at Blue Ribbon Downs. He continued to ride primarily in the central part of the United States until the early 1990s when he moved his tack to Los Alamitos Race Course in Southern California. After a couple of successful years in California, Carter moved his home base back to Oklahoma.

Carter won the All American Futurity twice, in 1998 aboard Falling In Loveagain and again in 2008 aboard Stolis Winner. In 2008, Carter set a new AQHA single-season earnings record by reaching the $5,027,173 mark in mount earnings. This eclipsed the previous record of $4.5 million which he had also set. Also in 2008, Carter broke his own single-meet record for wins at Remington Park in Oklahoma City, Oklahoma with a total of 98. Also in 2008, he rode Fast Prize Zoom to a World Record for 300 yards with a final time of 14.87 seconds at Sunland Park in Sunland, New Mexico. May 31, 2009 was declared by Governor Brad Henry as G. R. Carter Day in Oklahoma.

Carter holds the record for most wins for three different breeds of horses. He leads the all-time standing for American Quarter Horses, American Paint Horses, and Appaloosas. He has been named American Paint Horse Association (APHA) World Champion Jockey ten times in his career. He is the Paint Racing all-time leader in wins as well as mount earnings. He was the jockey for the record-setting paint horse Got Country Grip, who tied a North American racing record for any breed in 2008 by winning 16 consecutive races.

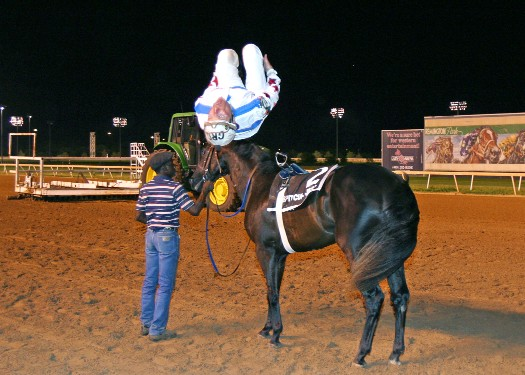
Doing a backflip after winning aboard Spit Curl Jess

Carter was known throughout the racing world for his "back-flip" dismounts. After winning a stakes race, he often used his gymnastics background to celebrate by performing a back-flip off of the horse from the saddle. He also has served as the Vice Chairman on the Board of Directors of the Jockey's Guild.

== Personal ==
Carter and his wife Shaena reside in Oklahoma City, Oklahoma. His father-in-law, Jerry Burgess, also won the All American Futurity as a jockey in 1975 aboard Bugs Alive In 75. In his spare time, Carter is an avid team roper. He will occasionally enter professional rodeos, and won the Pro-Am at the 2007 World Series of Team Roping.

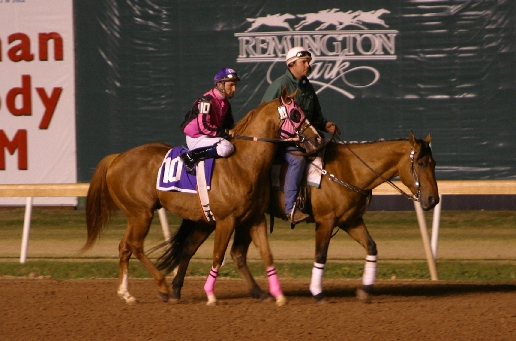
Carter aboard Country Chicks Man

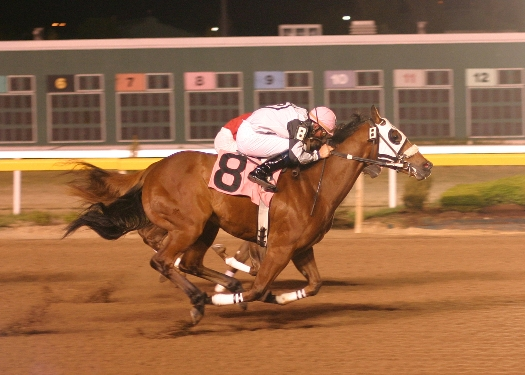
Carter aboard Got Country Grip'
