= Charger Bar =

Quarter Horse racehorse and broodmare

- Breed: Quarter Horse
- Discipline: Racing
- Sire: Tiny Charger
- Grandsire: Depth Charge (TB)
- Dam: La Ree Bar
- Maternal grandsire: Rocket Bar (TB)
- Sex: Mare
- Foaled: 1968
- Country: United States
- Color: Bay
- Breeder: Wayne Charlton
- Owner: Dr. Edward Allred

Record
- 43 starts: 28-3-6

Earnings
- $495,437.00

Major wins
- Los Alamitos Championship; Champion of Champions; Los Alamitos Derby; Go Man Go Handicap (twice); Vessel Maturity

Awards
- 1971 World Champion Quarter Running Horse; 1972 Champion Quarter Running Mare; 1973 Champion Quarter Running Mare; 1974 Champion Quarter Running Mare; Superior Race Horse

Honors
- American Quarter Horse Hall of Fame

An outstanding Quarter Horse racehorse, Charger Bar (1968–1997) was the 1971 World Champion Quarter Running Horse and an American Quarter Horse Association (or AQHA) Superior Race Horse. She was posthumously inducted into the American Quarter Horse Hall of Fame.

== Background ==
Charger Bar was foaled in 1968, a bay filly sired by Tiny Charger and out of a daughter of Rocket Bar (TB) named La Ree Bar. Her sire was a son of Depth Charge (TB) out of a descendant of Clabber.

== Racing career ==
Charger Bar's racing record was forty-three starts in six years. She won twenty-eight of her races, and placed second in three and third in six. She earned a total of $495,437.00 in purse money. Charger Bar beat Kaweah Bar three times in her racing career. She was undefeated in 1971, and was named World Champion Quarter Running Horse. Other honors included being named Champion Quarter Running Mare in 1972, 1973 and 1974. She also earned 144 AQHA racing points, which earned her the title of Superior Race Horse from the AQHA.

== Breeding record and honors ==
Charger Bar went on to produce fourteen foals. Of those foals, twelve started races, and ten earned Register of Merits and ten won races. Among her foals were Proud Heritage, Go Proudly, and Blushing By. Her offspring earned a total of $626,076.00 on the racetrack. She died November 26, 1997, and her ashes were scattered over the infield at the Los Alamitos racetrack.

In 2001 Charger Bar was inducted into the AQHA Hall of Fame.

== Pedigree ==
* St. Germans (TB)
Bold Venture
Possible (TB)
Depth Charge (TB)
Haste (TB)
Quickly (TB)
Stephanie (TB)
Tiny Charger
Clabber
Clabber II
Do Good
Clabber Tiny
Perifox (TB)
Tiny Iny (TB)
Tiny Rose (TB)
Charger Bar
Percentage (TB)
Three Bars (TB)
Myrtle Dee (TB)
Rocket Bar (TB)
Cartago (TB)
Golden Rocket (TB)
Morshion (TB)
La Ree Bar
Wayward Irving (TB)
Tinky Poo
Little Peach
Tinky Ann
High Step (TB)
Annahi (TB)
Verda Ann (TB)
