= Phar Lap (film) =

- Theatrical release poster
- Directed by: Simon Wincer
- Written by: David Williamson
- Produced by: John Sexton
- Starring: Tom Burlinson; Martin Vaughan; Judy Morris; Celia De Burgh; Ron Leibman
- Cinematography: Russell Boyd
- Edited by: Tony Paterson
- Music by: Bruce Rowland
- Production company: Hoyts Edgley
- Distributed by: Hoyts Distribution (Australia); 20th Century Fox (United States)
- Release dates: 11 August 1983 (Australia); 13 April 1984 (United States)
- Running time: 107 minutes
- Country: Australia
- Language: English
- Budget: A$5 million
- Box office: $2,879,333 (US & Canada) $9,258,884 (Australia)

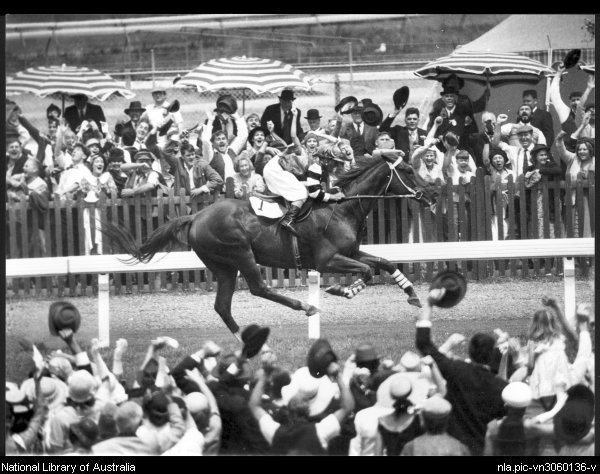
From the 1983 movie "Phar Lap" using a chestnut lookalike horse named "Towering Inferno".

Phar Lap (also released as Phar Lap: Heart of a Nation) is a 1983 Australian biographical drama film about the racehorse Phar Lap. The film stars Tom Burlinson and was written by David Williamson.

== Plot ==
A chestnut Thoroughbred horse called Phar Lap, known as Bobby by his strapper Tommy Woodcock (Tom Burlinson), collapses and dies in Tommy's arms at Menlo Park in California in 1932. The news is greeted with great sadness in Australia. The remainder of the film is done as flashback.

Five years earlier, Phar Lap arrives in Australia, purchased for £168 sight unseen from New Zealand. His trainer Harry Telford (Martin Vaughan), along with his wife Vi (Celia De Burgh) and young son Cappy, watch as Phar Lap is lowered onto the wharf in a sling, underweight with warts all over his face. Mrs. Telford comments that she "wonders what his (Telford's) American friend (Phar Lap's owner David Davis (Leibman)) will think?" Mr. Davis is not impressed with the underweight colt, calling him a cross between a sheep dog and a kangaroo, and orders Telford to sell him immediately. Telford protests, saying that the horse's pedigree is exceptional, with Carbine "The greatest horse of them all" on both sides of his bloodlines. So Mr. Davis agrees to lease him to Telford for three years and just keep one third of the horse's winnings, though Telford must pay for Phar Lap's upkeep and keep Davis's name out of it.

As Phar Lap is brought into the stables, he and a young strapper Tommy Woodcock form a strong bond. After Telford gallops Phar Lap hard up and down sand dunes, Tommy finds Phar Lap exhausted in his stable and immediately goes to Telford's home and confronts him about how hard he rode Phar Lap, saying that "he looked half dead." Telford sacked Tommy Woodcock, but then he was soon forced to give Tommy his job back when Phar Lap missed Tommy and stopped eating and wouldn't let anyone near him without ripping their shirt off.

Phar Lap lost his first few races, but Tommy Woodcock educated the horse by holding him back when they were training, sensing that the horse liked to come from behind. When Phar Lap started training well, Telford took the credit, telling Mr. Davis that he has "knocked that lazy streak out of him at last." He convinced Mr. Davis to pay the £30 entry fee into 1929 Australian Derby to be run at Randwick Racecourse in Sydney. The film shows the Australian Derby as Phar Lap's first win, although his first win was actually six months earlier in the RRC Maiden Juvenile Handicap at Sydney's other main racecourse Rosehill Racecourse. The win saves Phar Lap from being sold and the winnings, £7,135 (⅓ of which went to Davis) saves Telford from bankruptcy.

As the Great Depression hits, Phar Lap wins every race he enters. Mr. Davis attempts to capitalize on Phar Lap's success through shady betting schemes with known gambling identity Eric Connolly (John Stanton), something that Telford wants no part of. In preparation for the Melbourne Cup, the premier race in Australia, Mr. Davis pressures Telford to scratch Phar Lap from the Caulfield Cup to maximize Davis's betting returns. Under financial pressure, Telford reluctantly agrees.

As Tommy Woodcock walks Phar Lap across the street after a workout, someone tries to shoot the horse, and Tommy puts himself in between the gun and Phar Lap. Tommy Woodcock and Phar Lap go into hiding at a stud farm outside Melbourne, arriving at Flemington Racecourse at the last minute for the 1930 Melbourne Cup. Phar Lap wins, ridden by champion jockey Jim Pike (James Steele).

The horse is now back under Mr. Davis's control after the three-year agreement runs out. Mr. Davis then offers half of Phar Lap's ownership to Telford for £20,000, which Telford can't afford. Telford then fakes a hoof injury on Phar Lap and hoodwinks Mr. Davis into thinking that Phar Lap is lame, and Mr. Davis agrees to sell the half share of Phar Lap for only £4,000. Mr. Davis realizes he's been tricked when Phar Lap easily wins his next race.

The Victoria Racing Club, led by its Chairman Lachlan McKinnon (Vincent Ball), imposes an unprecedented weight of 10 stone 10 pounds (68 kg) for Phar Lap to carry in his next Melbourne Cup in 1931. And they threaten to permanently ban Mr. Davis and Phar Lap from racing if Mr. Davis takes Phar Lap out of the Melbourne Cup. Phar Lap surges to the lead but fades and finishes eighth, and the racing authorities face jeering crowds.

After the 1931 Melbourne Cup, Mr. Davis is approached by Jim Crofton (Roger Newcombe) about racing Phar Lap in the Agua Caliente Handicap at the Agua Caliente Racetrack in Tijuana, Mexico. Mr. Davis, knowing that Phar Lap would always be too heavily weighted in Australian handicap races and knowing that Weight for Age races offered less prize money, agrees to take Phar Lap to Mexico, but has to convince Telford it's worthwhile. Telford initially disagrees citing Australia's Quarantine Laws, but reluctantly agrees knowing that the Agua Caliente Handicap was the richest race in the world. Telford, saying that Phar Lap has brought him "nothing but trouble" refuses to go himself, preferring to concentrate on his new stud and stables at Braeside, south of Melbourne. He promotes Tommy to be Phar Lap's trainer, knowing the horse wouldn't do anything without Tommy there with him. Also traveling with Phar Lap is Tommy's friend Cashy Martin (Richard Morgan) as his new strapper, veterinarian Bill Nielsen (Robert Grubb), and jockey Billy Elliot (Paul Riley).

After arriving in the United States, Mr. Davis is forced to confront Crofton after finding that the race's purse has been halved from US$100,000 to $50,000. Tommy Woodcock soon clashes with Mr. Davis over Tommy's softer training methods and sometimes non-cooperative ways, including taking Phar Lap away from a press conference and back to his stable before the conference was finished. When questioned by Crofton about sacking Tommy Woodcock, Mr. Davis explains that "If I did, the goddamn horse would sit in his stall for the next month and cry." Tommy Woodcock also doesn't listen to advice about different horse shoes to suit the different track surface and Phar Lap badly cracks his front right hoof further hampering his preparation for the big race. Before the race, word gets out that some jockeys may have been bribed to keep Phar Lap boxed into the rails during the race, not allowing him to win and keep gamblers from losing large amounts of money. So before the race, Davis instructs jockey Billy Elliot to lead from the start, but Tommy Woodcock immediately counters this by telling Elliot to run Phar Lap's normal race of starting slow and finishing fast. Using Tommy Woodcock's advice (which initially angers Davis), Elliot rides Phar Lap to win the Agua Caliente Handicap, not knowing that blood was streaming from Phar Lap's hoof that had split.

== Cast ==
In order of appearance (Australian release)

- Tom Burlinson as Tommy Woodcock
- Towering Inferno as Phar Lap
- Richard Morgan as 'Cashy' Martin
- Robert Grubb as Bill Nielsen
- Martin Vaughan as Harry Telford
- Celia De Burgh as Vi Telford
- Ron Leibman as David J. Davis
- Henry Duvall as Aubrey Ping
- Pat Thomson as Edith Bone
- Gia Carides as Emma Bone / Woodcock (credited as Georgia Carr)
- Judy Morris as Bea Davis
- James Steele as Jim Pike
- Vincent Ball as Lachlan McKinnon
- Redmond Phillips as Sir Samuel Hordern
- Peter Whitford as Bert Wolfe
- John Stanton as Eric Connolly
- Maggie Millar as May Holmes
- Tim Robertson as Policeman
- Roger Newcombe as Jim Crofton
- Tommy Woodcock as trainer
- Len Kaserman as Baron Long
- Paul Riley as Billy Elliot

== Soundtrack ==
A soundtrack was released by EMI in 1983.

=== Charts ===
Chart (1983)	Peak position
Australia (Kent Music Report)	72

== Production ==
Producer John Sexton bought the rights to Phar Lap, a 1980 book by Michael Wilkinson. Extensive research was undertaken by David Williamson and Sexton, then Simon Wincer became involved.

The Thoroughbred gelding who played Phar Lap was Towering Inferno. He was bred by Shirley Pye-Macmillan at Walcha, New South Wales and later owned by Heath Harris. Towering Inferno was killed by lightning on 15 April 1999. The real Tommy Woodcock played a trainer in the movie.

== Differences from country to country ==
The United States' version of the film plays out differently. 20th Century Fox, who bought the rights to release the film in the US, edited the movie to play out in a more traditional way. Instead of starting with his death as seen in the Australian version, the film opens with Phar Lap getting off the boat in Australia. The film continues like the original version and ends with his death. This was done to make the ending more dramatic, since residents of the United States were unfamiliar with the story of Phar Lap.

== Box office ==
Phar Lap grossed $9,258,884 at the box office in Australia, which is equivalent to $24,443,454 in 2009 dollars.

Wincer later admitted he was disappointed the film did not attract the 14- to 22-year-old audience, and thought it might have been due to the movie's relative lack of romance. However, it remains one of the most popular Australian films.

Disney Studios wanted to release the film in the US but John Sexton and Wincer decided to go with 20th Century-Fox because they had done The Man from Snowy River (1982). Fox spent $300,000 on changes to the film, and released it in summer. "We got killed in the rush," says Wincer. "It got nice reviews, but didn't go much business."

== DVD release ==
The "2 Disc Collector's Edition" released in Australia as Phar Lap: Hero to a Nation by Roadshow Entertainment includes among the "extras" on the second disc a long audio recording of a conversation between Aaron Treve "Tommy" Woodcock and director Simon Wincer on 4 July 1984, and a short newsreel documentary The Mighty Conqueror, which would have been first screened c. December 1931.

== See also ==
- Cinema of Australia
- List of films about horses
- List of films about horse racing
