= Gold Coast Express =

Gold Coast Express may refer to

- Gold Coast Express (horse), a race horse and winner of the Champion of Champions horse race
- Gold Coast Express (Zürich), a precursor to the Zürich S-Bahn rail service in Switzerland
