= Refrigerator (horse) =

Quarter Horse racehorse

- Breed: Quarter Horse
- Discipline: Racing
- Sire: Rare Jet
- Grandsire: Fast Jet
- Dam: Native Parr
- Maternal grandsire: Heisanative
- Sex: Gelding
- Foaled: 1988
- Country: United States
- Color: Bay

Record
- 22 wins, 11 stakes wins SI-115

Earnings
- $2,126,309.00

Major wins
- All American Futurity (1990); Champion of Champions (1992, 1993, 1994)

Awards
- AQHA Superior Race Horse

Honors
- American Quarter Horse Hall of Fame

Refrigerator (1988–1999) was an Appendix Quarter Horse racehorse who won the Champions of Champions race three times. He was a 1988 bay gelding sired by Rare Jet and out of Native Parr. Rare Jet was a grandson of Easy Jet and also a double descendant of both Depth Charge (TB) and Three Bars (TB). His dam was a daughter of Heisanative, a son of Raise a Native (TB) and a grandson of Native Dancer (TB). During his race career he earned over $2 million and won twenty-two races, eleven of them stakes races. He won the 1990 All American Futurity. Nine of the stakes races were Grade I races. He was bred by Sonny Vaughn, and died in February 1999.

Refrigerator was inducted into the AQHA Hall of Fame in 2000.
