= Top Moon =

Quarter Horse racehorse and sire

- Breed: Quarter Horse
- Discipline: Racing
- Sire: Moon Deck
- Grandsire: Top Deck (TB)
- Dam: Rica Bar
- Maternal grandsire: Barred
- Sex: Stallion
- Foaled: 1960 died 1984
- Country: United States
- Color: Black
- Breeder: James V. A. Carter

Record
- 40 starts: 15-9-5; AAAT speed rating

Earnings
- $40,636.00

Major wins
- PCQHRA Futurity, Bardella Stakes

Honors
- American Quarter Horse Hall of Fame

Top Moon (1960–1984) was a Quarter Horse racehorse and leading racehorse sire.

== Life ==
Top Moon was a 1960 black stallion sired by Moon Deck out of Rica Bar. Rica Bar was a granddaughter of Three Bars (TB).

== Racing career ==
Top Moon raced for three years, starting forty times. In those starts he won fifteen times, came in second nine times and placed third five times. He attained a top speed rating of AAAT alongside earnings of $40,636.00. He won two stakes races, the PCQHRA Futurity and the Bardella Stakes.

== Breeding record ==
As a breeding stallion, Top Moon sired Top Bug, Bug's Alive in 75, Moon Lark, Lady Bug's Moon, Casady Casanova, and Full Moon Zestee. Bugs Alive in 75 won the 1975 All American Futurity as well as being named 1975 Champion Quarter Running Stallion. Moon Lark won the All American Futurity in 1978 and was named 1978 Champion Quarter Running Two Year Old Colt, and 1979 World Champion Quarter Running Horse.

== Death and honors ==
Top Moon died in 1984 when he developed complications from an ear infection.

Top Moon was inducted into the American Quarter Horse Association's (or AQHA) AQHA Hall of Fame in 1999.

== Pedigree ==
Equipoise (TB)
Equestrian (TB)
Frilette (TB)
Top Deck (TB)
Chicaro (TB)
River Boat (TB)
Last Boat (TB)
Moon Deck
*Under Fire (TB)
Peace Pipe (TB)
Loving Cup (TB)
Moonlight Night
The Dun Horse
Mae
La Bergeron
Top Moon
Percentage (TB)
Three Bars (TB)
Myrtle Dee (TB)
Barred
Red Joe Of Arizona
Ready
Ruby by Red Cloud
Rica Bar
John P. Grier (TB)
Nassak (TB)
Ethel D (TB)
Caprica
Pankey's Lucky
Puzzle
Pankey mare
