= Red Pollard =

Canadian horse racing jockey

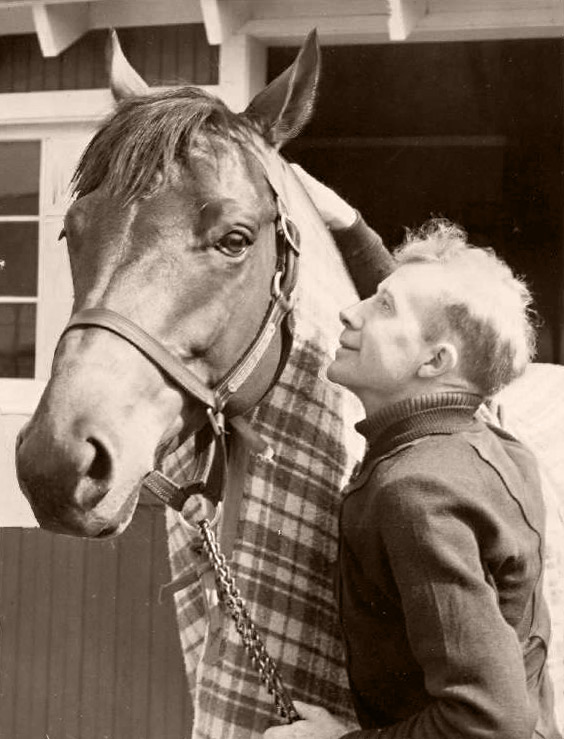
- Red Pollard with Seabiscuit

Personal information
- Born: October 27, 1909 Edmonton, Alberta, Canada
- Died: March 7, 1981 (aged 71) Pawtucket, Rhode Island
- Occupation: Jockey

Horse racing career
- Sport: Horse racing

Major racing wins
- Dade County Handicap (1932); Prince of Wales Stakes (1933); King Edward Gold Cup (1933); Agua Caliente Handicap (1934); Governor's Handicap (1936); Bay Bridge Handicap (1936); World's Fair Handicap (1936); Bay Meadows Handicap (1937); Brooklyn Handicap (1937); Yonkers Handicap (1937); Butler Handicap (1937); Massachusetts Handicap (1937); San Juan Capistrano Handicap (1937); San Carlos Handicap (1937); Riggs Handicap (1937); San Antonio Handicap (1940); Santa Anita Handicap (1940)

Honours
- Canadian Horse Racing Hall of Fame (1982)

Significant horses
- Gallant Sir, Pompoon, Seabiscuit
- Updated on April 1, 2007

John M. "Red" Pollard (October 27, 1909 – March 7, 1981) was a Canadian horse racing jockey. A founding member of the Jockeys' Guild in 1940, Pollard rode at racetracks in the United States and is best known for riding Seabiscuit.

== Family history ==
Red Pollard was the grandson of Michael Pollard, born in 1834 in Ireland. Michael immigrated to New Jersey in 1850, moved to Illinois by 1855, and in 1863 married Irish immigrant Bridget Moloney. They moved to Iowa in 1870, where Red's father, John A., was born in 1875.

John A. immigrated to Edmonton, Alberta, in 1898. After the turn of the century, he and his brother Frank founded the Pollard Bros Brickyard.

John M. "Red" Pollard was born in Edmonton in 1909. He spent his early years in affluence, but the family brickyard was destroyed when the North Saskatchewan River flooded in 1915, instantly throwing the family into poverty.

== Career ==
Red Pollard stood 5 ft 7 in (1.70 m) and weighed 115 lb (52 kg), which is considered big for a jockey. In 1933, Pollard rode in Ontario at the Fort Erie racetrack. Early in his career, he lost the vision in his right eye due to a traumatic brain injury. This injury occurred when he was hit in the head by a rock thrown up by another horse during a training ride. Because he would not have been allowed to ride had the full extent of his injury been known, he kept his vision loss a secret for the rest of his riding career.

Down and out in Detroit in 1936, Pollard was hired by horse trainer Tom Smith to ride Charles S. Howard's Seabiscuit. The team's first stakes win came in the 1936 Governor's Handicap. Pollard and Seabiscuit won numerous important races, including the 1937 Brooklyn Handicap at Old Aqueduct Racetrack in New York City, the 1937 Massachusetts Handicap at Suffolk Downs in Boston, and famously lost by a nose at the 1937 Santa Anita Handicap. Pollard and Seabiscuit were considered by most as the best pairing of race horse and jockey in the US at that time. In 1940, Pollard jockeyed the then 7-year-old Seabiscuit to a win in the Santa Anita Handicap at Santa Anita Park in Arcadia, California. It was Seabiscuit's last race. Pollard rode Seabiscuit 30 times with 18 wins - all of them stakes or handicaps.

Following the 1940 season, Pollard bought a house in Pawtucket, Rhode Island. Pollard continued to ride into the 1950s, mostly in New England. Eventually, he became a jockey's valet at Narragansett Park in Rhode Island.

== Honours, awards and portrayals ==
In 1982, Pollard was inducted into the Canadian Horse Racing Hall of Fame.

Actor Tobey Maguire portrays Pollard in the 2003 film Seabiscuit.

== Personal life ==
Besides the previously referenced damage to his vision, Pollard was known for other severe injuries that he suffered. In February 1938, Pollard fell while racing on Fair Knightess, another horse owned by Howard. His chest was crushed by the weight of the falling animal, and his ribs and arm were broken. He had extensive surgery, and almost did not survive. He recovered, and was working again by the July of the same year, when he had a compound fracture in his leg from a runaway horse. When he had nearly recovered, while walking the hills of Howard's estate, he broke his leg again when he stepped into a hole. Howard, who thought of Pollard as a son, paid for his hospital stays throughout their time together.

While recuperating from his July 1938 injuries, Pollard fell in love with his nurse, Agnes Conlon. They were married the following year and had two children, Norah (1940-) and John Jr (1945–2006).

Pollard died on March 7, 1981, in Pawtucket, Rhode Island. He is buried at Notre Dame Cemetery, a mile north of Narragansett Park racetrack, beside his wife who died of cancer two weeks after his death.

== See also ==
- List of Canadian sports personalities
