= Three Oh's =

American Quarter Horse racehorse

- Breed: Quarter Horse
- Discipline: Racing
- Sire: Three Chicks
- Grandsire: Three Bars (TB)
- Dam: Oh My Oh
- Maternal grandsire: Spotted Bull (TB)
- Sex: Stallion
- Foaled: 1966
- Country: United States
- Color: brown
- Breeder: Henry R. Hurd

Record
- 16-10-2-1; SI-100

Earnings
- $201,716

Major wins
- All American Futurity

Honors
- Texas Horse Racing Hall of Fame

Three Oh's (foaled 1966) was a brown Quarter Horse stallion, AQHA #0458120, winner of the 1968 All American Futurity. He sired Maskeo Lad, a 1972 brown Quarter Horse stallion, AQHA #0835539, who was the 1975 AQHA Racing Champion Three-Year-Old Colt, and Oh Shiney, a 1976 black Quarter Horse stallion, AQHA #1431631, who was the 1981 AQHA Racing Champion Aged Stallion. Three Oh's sired seven crops before his death in 1976 at age 10. All totaled, he sired earners of over $4.7 million including 57 stakes winners. He set track records in 1968–1969 at several tracks in the Southwest, and was inducted into the Texas Horse Racing Hall of Fame. He was owned by Dr. & Mrs. D. G. Strole of Abilene, Texas and trained by C.W. "Bubba" Cascio.

== Pedigree ==
Percentage (TB)
Three Bars (TB)
Myrtle Dee (TB)
Three Chicks
Chicaro Bill
Chicado V
Do Good
Three Oh's
Bull Dog (TB)
Spotted Bull (TB)
Spotted Beauty (TB)
Oh My Oh
Leo
Miss Meyers
Star's Lou
