= Dash For Cash =

Quarter Horse racehorse and sire

- Breed: Quarter Horse
- Sire: Rocket Wrangler
- Grandsire: Rocket Bar (TB)
- Dam: Find A Buyer (TB)
- Damsire: To Market (TB)
- Sex: Stallion
- Foaled: 17 April 1973
- Died: 20 May 1996 (aged 23)
- Country: United States
- Color: Sorrel
- Breeder: B. F. Phillips, Jr.
- Trainer: C.W. “Bubba” Cascio
- Record: 25–21–3–0
- Earnings: $507,687.00

Major wins
- Sun Country Futurity, Lubbock Downs Futurity, Los Alamitos Derby, Champion of Champions (twice)

Awards
- 1976 World Champion Quarter Running Horse, 1977 World Champion Quarter Running Horse

Honors
- American Quarter Horse Hall of Fame
- Last updated on January 11, 2008

Dash For Cash (April 17, 1973 – May 20, 1996) was an American Quarter Horse racehorse and an influential sire in the Quarter Horse breed.

== Racing career ==
Dash For Cash won $507,688 during his career and was the Racing World Champion in 1976 and 1977.

Dash For Cash victories came in the Champion of Champions (1976, 1977), Sun Country Futurity, Los Alamitos Invitational Champ, Los Alamitos Derby, Vessels Maturity, and the Lubbock Downs Futurity.

In May 1996, Dash for Cash developed complications from equine protozoal myeloencephalitis (EPM) and was euthanized.

Dash For Cash was inducted into the AQHA Hall of Fame in 1997.

== Sire line tree ==
- Dash For Cash
  - Cash Rate
  - Calyx
  - First Down Dash
    - Dash Ta Fame
      - Real Claim To Fame
      - Dash Ta Diamonds
      - Cuatro Fame
    - Royal Quick Dash
    - Dash Thru Traffic
    - A Classic Dash
      - Drop Your Sox
      - Classified As Dash
      - Egos Classic Dash
    - A Ransom
    - The Down Side
    - Ocean Runaway
      - Runaway Tyme
    - Wave Carver
    - No Secrets Here
    - Half Pipe
    - Oceans Apart
  - Cash Legacy
  - Dashing Val
  - Dash For Perks
    - Dash N Sparks
  - Takin On The Cash
  - Some Dasher

== Pedigree ==
Percentage (TB)
Three Bars (TB)
Myrtle Dee (TB)
Rocket Bar (TB)
Cartago (TB)
Golden Rocket (TB)
Morshion (TB)
Rocket Wrangler
Top Deck (TB)
Go Man Go
Lightfoot Sis
Go Galla Go
Direct Win (TB)
La Galla Win
La Gallina V
Dash For Cash
Brokers Tip (TB)
Market Wise (TB)
On Hand (TB)
To Market (TB)
Johnstown (TB)
Pretty Does (TB)
Creese (TB)
Find a Buyer (TB)
=Hyperion (TB)
*Alibhai (TB)
=Teresina (TB)
Hide And Seek (TB)
Whirlaway (TB)
Scattered (TB)
Imperatrice (TB)
