= Michael Wrona =

Australian racecaller

Michael Wrona (born 3 February 1966 (age 59)) is an announcer from Brisbane, Australia specializing in Quarter Horse and Thoroughbred horse racing.

== Background ==
Michael Wrona began calling races in Australia at the age of 17. The first track at which he called was Kilcoy, situated about 40 miles from the Queensland capital, Brisbane. and has worked at race tracks in the United States since 1990. His move to the USA was prompted by an invitation from iconic Australian track announcer John Tapp. The management at now-defunct Hollywood Park were interested in signing Tapp as their full-time announcer. However, Tapp did not want to leave Australia but knew that the very talented Wrona would be an ideal person for Hollywood Park. Wrona thought it was a prankster joke when Tapp called him on the phone with the Hollywood Park proposal. The opportunity for a budding young racecaller to join Tapp was the stepping stone to Wrona's now long time of living and working in the United States.

Wrona has called races at the Sonoma County Fairgrounds since 2009. He was hired as the voice of Santa Anita Park in March 2016, replacing Trevor Denman, and remained there until he was succeeded by Frank Mirahmadi following the 2018 Autumn meet. He has previously called races at Golden Gate Fields, and has also worked at Arlington Park, Fair Grounds, Turf Paradise, Lone Star Park, Retama Park, Del Mar, and the old Hollywood Park and Bay Meadows race tracks.

In 2019, Wrona would begin calling races at Kentucky Downs. He made an appearance in January 2019 at Keeneland as an announcer for the January Sale horse auction. He is currently calling the races at Grants Pass Downs for the fall meet, plus Los Alamitos for the summer meets in June–July & September.

== Historical calls ==
Michael Wrona has called some historic thoroughbred races during his calling career in the United States.

In 1996, Wrona called the Arlington Citation Challenge at Arlington Park (telecast live, nationwide, on CBS), in which Cigar won his 16th consecutive race. The win tied the previous record of nearly 50 years held by Citation.

On December 10, 1999, at Hollywood Park, Wrona called the race that saw Laffit Pincay Jr pass Bill Shoemaker for most career victories by a jockey. Nearly seven years later, on December 1, 2006, Wrona was the announcer for the race at Bay Meadows in which Russell Baze passed Pincay for the same honors.

On November 11, 2008, as one of five announcers invited to audition for the job at Churchill Downs, Wrona called all seven of Julien Leparoux's winners. Leparoux became only the second jockey in the 134-year history of Churchill Downs to win seven races in a single day. He tied the record set by Pat Day set when he won seven of the eight races on June 20, 1984. Wrona remarked during the race just after crossing the line in the fourth consecutive win on the card by Leparoux: "I tell you, he'd win on a broomstick!". On his fifth day of calling the races, Wrona had to step out due to vocal issues leading to John Asher calling the final two races of the day.

== Other noteworthy credits ==
Wrona voiced a race call for the 1992 Seinfeld episode titled "The Subway," in which Kramer overhears a tip while riding a subway train.

Wrona called the 2000 Preakness on a national radio network, filling in for Tom Durkin.

In 2012, Wrona called South America's biggest race, the Gran Premio Carlos Pellegrini, from the Hipodromo de San Isidro in Buenos Aires, Argentina for the HRTV network. This marked the fourth country in which Wrona had broadcast - apart from his two countries of citizenship, Australia and the United States, he was invited to share the announcing duties when thoroughbred racing returned to historic Agua Caliente in Tijuana, Mexico, in 1991.

In 2020, he began calling Quarter Horse and Thoroughbred races at Los Alamitos.
