= Lena's Bar =

20th-century American Thoroughbred mare

- Sire: Three Bars
- Grandsire: Percentage
- Dam: Lena Valenti
- Damsire: Gray Dream
- Sex: Mare
- Foaled: 1954
- Country: United States
- Breeder: Walter Merrick
- Owner: Walter Merrick
- Record: 76 starts: 24-28-10
- Earnings: $28,311.00

Major wins
- Bright Eyes Stakes; Buttons and Bows Handicap; Bright Eyes Handicap

Awards
- AQHA Racing Register of Merit

Honours
- American Quarter Horse Hall of Fame

A registered Thoroughbred mare, Lena's Bar (1954–1969) raced on the Quarter Horse racetracks and was the dam of Jet Smooth, Double Dancer and Easy Jet, three outstanding Quarter Horse stallions.

== Life ==
A Thoroughbred daughter of the stallion Three Bars, Lena's Bar was out of Lena Valenti, a granddaughter of Percentage. Thus, Lena's Bar had Percentage, Three Bar's sire, on both sides of her pedigree. Lena Valenti raced on the Quarter tracks, ending with a record of two starts, one win, one third with an AA speed rating.

== Racing career ==
Lena's Bar raced mainly in Quarter Horse races. She started seventy-six times, winning twenty-four races. She placed second eighteen times and was third ten times. Her total earnings were $28,308.00 with 67 racing points with the American Quarter Horse Association (or AQHA). She rated an AAA speed rating in those races, and was a stakes race winner. She once outran Go Man Go, Double Bid, Tidy Too, Miss Louton, Vandy's Flash and Vanetta Dee in one race. Her sister Little Lena's Bar set four world records at four different distances.

== Breeding record ==
After Lena's Bar retired from racing, she produced the Quarter Horse stallions Double Dancer, Jet Smooth, and Easy Jet, along with two Quarter Horse mares – Delta Ann and Mayflower Ann. Her offspring earned $557,199.00 on the track, with all five being winners and Register of Merit earners. Lena's Bar died in 1969.

Lena's Bar was inducted into the AQHA's Hall of Fame in 2003.

== Pedigree ==
Ballot
Midway
Thirty-third
Percentage
Bulse
Gossip Avenue
Rosewood
Three Bars
Ultimus
Luke McLuke
Midge
Myrtle Dee
Patriot
Civil Maid
Civil Rule
Lena's Bar
=Tetratema
*Gino
=Teresina
Gray Dream
Traumer
Dark Love
Sunny Love
Lena Valenti
Midway
Percentage
Gossip Avenue
Perhobo
General Thatcher
Homebody
Scramble
