= Rocket Wrangler =

Quarter Horse racehorse and sire

- Breed: Quarter Horse
- Discipline: Racing
- Sire: Rocket Bar (TB)
- Grandsire: Three Bars (TB)
- Dam: Go Galla Go
- Maternal grandsire: Go Man Go
- Sex: Stallion
- Foaled: 1968
- Country: United States
- Color: Sorrel

Record
- 23-10-4-4; SI-97

Earnings
- $252,167

Major wins
- All American Futurity; Rainbow Futurity

Honors
- American Quarter Horse Hall of Fame; 1970 Champion Quarter Running 2-year-old Colt

Winner of the All American Futurity, Rocket Wrangler (1968–1992) went on to sire Dash For Cash.

== Life ==
Rocket Wrangler was a 1968 son of American Quarter Horse Hall of Fame member Rocket Bar a Thoroughbred stallion. Rocket Wrangler was out of Go Galla Go, a daughter of another Hall of Fame member Go Man Go.

== Racing career ==
Rocket Wrangler won ten times on the racetrack, finishing second four times and third another four times, earning $252,167 in race earnings. His highest speed index was 97. He won the All American Futurity and the Rainbow Futurity, and finished second in the All American Congress Futurity.

== Breeding record ==
After retiring, Rocket Wrangler went on to sire 56 stakes winners, including Hall of Fame member Dash For Cash. His foals earned over $9,400,000 on the racetrack.

== Death and honors ==
Rocket Wrangler died on November 29, 1992. He was inducted into the AQHA Hall of Fame in 2010.

== Sire line tree ==
- Rocket Wrangler
  - Dash For Cash
    - Cash Rate
    - Calyx
    - First Down Dash
      - Dash Ta Fame
        - Real Claim To Fame
        - Dash Ta Diamonds
        - Cuatro Fame
      - Royal Quick Dash
      - Dash Thru Traffic
      - A Classic Dash
        - Drop Your Sox
        - Classified As Dash
        - Egos Classic Dash
      - A Ransom
      - The Down Side
      - Ocean Runaway
        - Runaway Tyme
      - Wave Carver
      - No Secrets Here
      - Half Pipe
      - Oceans Apart
    - Cash Legacy
    - Dashing Val
    - Dash For Perks
      - Dash N Sparks
    - Takin On The Cash
    - Some Dasher

== Pedigree ==
Percentage (TB)
Three Bars (TB)
Myrtle Dee (TB)
Rocket Bar (TB)
Cartago (TB)
Golden Rocket (TB)
Morshion (TB)
Rocket Wrangler
Top Deck (TB)
Go Man Go
Lightfoot Sis
Go Galla Go
Direct Win (TB)
La Galla Win
La Gallina V
