= Equipoise (horse) =

American-bred Thoroughbred racehorse

- Equipoise, by Franklin Brooke Voss
- Sire: Pennant
- Grandsire: Peter Pan
- Dam: Swinging
- Damsire: Broomstick
- Sex: Stallion
- Foaled: 1928
- Country: United States
- Colour: Chestnut
- Breeder: Harry Payne Whitney
- Owner: Cornelius Vanderbilt Whitney
- Trainer: Fred Hopkins; Thomas J. Healey
- Record: 51: 29-10-4
- Earnings: $338,610

Major wins
- Eastern Shore Handicap (1930); Great American Stakes (1930); Juvenile Stakes (1930); Keene Memorial Stakes (1930); National Stallion Stakes (1930); Pimlico Futurity (1930); Harford Handicap (1932); Havre de Grace Handicap (1932); Whitney Handicap (1932); Stars and Stripes Handicap (1932); The Toboggan (1932); Metropolitan Handicap (1932, 1933); Wilson Stakes (1932, 1933); Arlington Handicap (1933); Philadelphia Handicap (1933, 1934); Suburban Handicap (1933); Hawthorne Gold Cup Handicap (1933); Saratoga Cup (1933); Dixie Handicap (1934)

Awards
- U.S. Champion 2-Year-Old Colt (1930); U.S. Champion Older Horse (1932, 1933, 1934); U. S. Horse of the Year (1932, 1933); Leading sire in North America (1942)

Honours
- United States Racing Hall of Fame (1957); Equipoise Mile Handicap at Arlington Park #21 - Top 100 U.S. Racehorses of the 20th Century

Equipoise (1928–1938) was an American Thoroughbred racehorse and sire. In a career which lasted from 1930 until 1935, he ran fifty-one times and won twenty-nine races. A leading two-year-old in 1930, he missed most of the next season, including two of the three American Triple Crown races through injury and illness. "Ekky" returned to the track in 1934 and proved to be a dominant champion, winning numerous important stakes races in the next three years. Equipoise died in 1938 after a short but promising stud career.

== Background ==
Equipoise was a chestnut bred in the United States by Harry Payne Whitney and owned by his son, Cornelius Vanderbilt Whitney. He was called the "Chocolate Soldier" by his fans, due to his elegance and symmetry. His sire, Pennant, won the Belmont Futurity Stakes for Harry Payne Whitney in 1913. Equipoise's dam, Swinging, was a descendant of The Oaks winner Miami, placing him in the same Thoroughbred family as the 1897 English Triple Crown winner Galtee More and the 1902 Epsom Derby winner Ard Patrick as well as some well-known American runners, such as Intentionally and Seabiscuit.

As a yearling, Equipoise was an unimpressive individual. C. V. Whitney thought so little of the duckling that he sent him to his second-string trainer, Fred Hopkins.

== Racing career ==
=== 1930–1931: early career ===
As a two-year-old, Equipoise ran sixteen times, claiming his first stakes victory when he won the Keene Memorial Stakes at Belmont Park. In September, he ran in the Belmont Futurity the most valuable two-year-old race of the season in which he was beaten a nose by Jamestown. Although Jamestown's victory was regarded by some as having decided the identity of the best two-year-old, he did not race again in 1930, while Equipoise went on to further success. On November 5, he beat Twenty Grand by half a length with Mate a neck away in third in the Pimlico Futurity. After starting slowly, he settled the race in the straight with what the New York Times described as "a brilliant burst of speed" to reverse two earlier defeats by Twenty Grand. When his jockey, Sonny Workman, was asked if this was his greatest race, Workman replied: "My greatest race? Hell, it may have been the greatest race anybody ever saw."

Although there were no formal awards for Thoroughbred racing in 1930, press opinion was that Equipoise's win at Pimlico entitled him to "a share of the 2 year old championship honors"

Equipoise started 1931 as the favorite for the Kentucky Derby and won on his reappearance at Havre de Grace, Maryland. At the same track on April 26, he finished last of the six runners in the Chesapeake Stakes, after which he was reported to be suffering from a kidney ailment described as "azoturia" or "blackwater". Later reports ascribed his defeat to problems with his "shelly" feet. In the Preakness Stakes, which was the first of the Triple Crown races in 1931, he finished fourth behind Mate. A week later, he was withdrawn from the Derby on the day of the race and did not race again that year.

=== 1932–1935: later career ===
As a four-year-old in 1932, Equipoise won ten of his fourteen starts. On May 21, he won the Metropolitan Handicap at Belmont Park from Sun Meadow, with Mate third. Equipoise, who started 3/5 favorite, won by two and a half lengths despite being eased down by Workman near the finish and was received with "thunderous applause". On May 31 at Arlington Park, Chicago, Equipoise set a world record of 1:34.4 for a mile when winning the Delavan Purse. In the Stars and Stripes Handicap at the same course four days later, he "outclassed" his opponents. On August 13, Equipoise led all the way to win the Whitney Stakes by three lengths from the three-year-old Gusto. According to the New York Times report, the win confirmed his status as the best horse in the handicap division.

At five, Equipoise won seven more races. On June 3, he gave 26 pounds to the runner-up, Okapi, in again winning the Metropolitan, living up to his reputation as the "king of the handicap horses". Four days later, he ran in the Suburban Handicap carrying 132 pounds over a mile and a quarter. He won by two lengths from Osculator, with Apprentice five lengths back in third. In August, he faced the highly regarded Gallant Sir in the Hawthorne Gold Cup and won a "thrilling" race by two lengths to record his sixth successive win. His other wins included April's Philadelphia Handicap at Havre de Grace Racetrack which he won again in 1934. In September he won the Saratoga Cup in which he raced beyond a mile and a quarter for the first time and won from Gusto and Keep Out.

As a six-year-old, Equipoise was kept in training with the aim of beating Sun Beau's earnings record. In the spring, he won the Philadelphia Handicap at Havre de Grace and the Dixie Handicap at Pimlico before being rested till autumn. On November 6, he overcame a wet and muddy Belmont track (described as a "sea of slop") to beat Faireno in the Whitney Gold Trophy. At the start of 1935, the seven-year-old Equipoise was sent to California for the inaugural running of the world's richest race, the Santa Anita Handicap, which was to be his final race. He showed some promise in defeat in two prep races and started favorite despite top weight of 130 pounds against what was described as "the greatest field of horses ever assembled". Equipoise's challenge ended in disappointment: according to Sonny Workman, he "simply wouldn't run" as he finished seventh to the Irish-bred Steeplechase specialist Azucar. Whitney later revealed that Equipoise had suffered a recurrence of the tendon injury which had kept him off the track in the previous summer. He was retired to stud with earnings of $338,610, the second highest in racing history up to that time.

== Assessment ==
His career was greatly restricted by hoof problems, but he was still regarded by contemporary observers as the outstanding American horse of his era. Although there were no formal awards at this time, he was regarded as United States Horse of the Year in both 1932 and 1933 and as the best older horse in 1932, 1933, and 1934.

In the Blood-Horse magazine ranking of the top 100 thoroughbred champions of the 20th Century, which ranked only horses that ran in North America, Equipoise was ranked #21. In their book A Century of Champions, the British writers Tony Morris and John Randall placed Equipoise at #163 in their global ranking of 20th Century Thoroughbreds. Equipoise was also inducted into the National Museum of Racing and Hall of Fame in Saratoga Springs, New York, in 1957.

== Stud record ==
Equipoise stood as a stallion for only four seasons before his death on August 4, 1938, at the age of ten. Four years later, the success of his progeny, notably the Kentucky Derby and Belmont Stakes winner Shut Out, saw him become America's Champion sire.

== References in popular culture ==
In "Fugue for Tinhorns," the opening number of the musical Guys and Dolls, Equipoise is referred to as the great-grandfather of one of the song's fictional racehorses.

"...he..streaked down the street like Equipoise after a sack of oats." The Masterful Mind of Mortimer Meek, Fantastic Adventures, May 1941; reprinted in The First William P. McGivern Science Fiction MEGAPACK, Wildside Press.

Equipoise is one of the racing mice in the movie Stalag 17.

== Sire line tree ==
- Equipoise
  - Attention
  - Equestrian
    - Stymie
      - Joe Jones
    - Flying Missel
      - Man Of Iron
    - Top Deck
      - Moon Deck
        - Caprideck
        - Cue Deck
        - Jet Deck
        - Top Moon
        - Jet Too
      - Ridge Butler
      - Play Deck
      - Go Man Go
        - Mr Meyers
        - Hustling Man
        - Duplicate Copy
        - Story Man
      - Rebel Cause
      - Mighty Deck
      - War Machine
  - Bolingbroke
  - Swing And Sway
    - Saggy
      - Carry Back
        - Sharp Gary
    - Fluctuate
  - Shut Out
    - One Hitter
    - Hall Of Fame
    - Closed Door
    - Social Outcast

== Pedigree ==
Pedigree of Equipoise (USA), chestnut stallion, 1928
Sire Pennant (USA) 1911	Peter Pan (USA); 1904	Commando (USA)	Domino (USA)
Sire Pennant (USA) 1911	Peter Pan (USA); 1904	Commando (USA)	Emma C (USA)
Sire Pennant (USA) 1911	Peter Pan (USA); 1904	Cinderella (GB)	Hermit (GB)
Sire Pennant (USA) 1911	Peter Pan (USA); 1904	Cinderella (GB)	Mazurka (GB)
Sire Pennant (USA) 1911	Royal Rose (GB); 1894	Royal Hampton (GB)	Hampton* (GB)
Sire Pennant (USA) 1911	Royal Rose (GB); 1894	Royal Hampton (GB)	Princess (GB)
Sire Pennant (USA) 1911	Royal Rose (GB); 1894	Belle Rose (GB)	Beaudesert (GB)
Sire Pennant (USA) 1911	Royal Rose (GB); 1894	Belle Rose (GB)	Monte Rosa (GB)
Dam Swinging (USA) 1922	Broomstick (USA); 1901	Ben Brush (USA)	Bramble (USA)
Dam Swinging (USA) 1922	Broomstick (USA); 1901	Ben Brush (USA)	Roseville (USA)
Dam Swinging (USA) 1922	Broomstick (USA); 1901	Elf (GB)	Galliard (GB)
Dam Swinging (USA) 1922	Broomstick (USA); 1901	Elf (GB)	Sylvabelle (GB)
Dam Swinging (USA) 1922	Ballancoire (FR); 1911	Meddler (GB)	St Gatien (GB)
Dam Swinging (USA) 1922	Ballancoire (FR); 1911	Meddler (GB)	Busybody (GB)
Dam Swinging (USA) 1922	Ballancoire (FR); 1911	Ballantrae (GB)	Ayrshire* (GB)
Dam Swinging (USA) 1922	Ballancoire (FR); 1911	Ballantrae (GB)	Abeyance (GB)(Family: 5-j)

* Equipoise is inbred 4S x 5D to the stallion Hampton, meaning that he appears fourth generation on the sire side of his pedigree, and fifth generation (via Ayrshire) on the dam side of his pedigree.
