= Tommy Woodcock =

Professional Australian racehorse trainer and handler

Aaron Treve Woodcock Jr. (8 October 1905 – 27 April 1985) professionally Tommy Woodcock, was the Australian racehorse trainer and handler of the thoroughbred racehorse Phar Lap.

== Early life ==
Tommy Woodcock was born in 1905 at Uralgurra in Bellbrook, near Kempsey, New South Wales. He was the third of four children to Aaron Treve Woodcock and Annie Catherine Smith.

Tommy Woodcock first worked as an apprentice jockey for Barney Quinn, who was based at Randwick, New South Wales. Woodcock won several races, and worked as a jockey until 1927, when he was 22 years old. However, his size and weight increased, and he gave up jockeying in favour of being a groom and exercise rider.

It was in this way that he met trainer Harry Telford and his horse Phar Lap, widely regarded as the greatest Australian racehorse of all time. In 1929, Telford employed Woodcock as Phar Lap's strapper. From then on, Tommy and Phar Lap were virtually inseparable. Before big races, Woodcock would sleep outside Phar Lap's stable, and it was said that Phar Lap refused food from anyone but Woodcock.

== Career ==
Phar Lap was shipped to America, and Woodcock was employed as his trainer while he was in America. Woodcock trained Phar Lap and he won the rich Agua Caliente Handicap. Shortly afterwards, on 5 April 1932, Phar Lap suddenly died in Menlo Park, California. Always devoted to the horse, Woodcock was with Phar Lap in his final moments.

In 1946, Woodcock was initiated into Freemasonry, within the Smithfield Lodge. Other famous names in that Lodge were Billy Guyatt and William Angliss.

Woodcock continued to work with horses until his retirement in 1983. In his later years he achieved fame through training the horse Reckless, who won the Sydney Cup, Adelaide Cup, and Brisbane Cup in 1977, and ran second in the Melbourne Cup.

== Personal life ==
On 21 January 1931, Tommy Woodcock married Emma Jane Bone at St Stephen’s Presbyterian Church in Sydney. While the couple would have no children, they cared for a number of children from broken homes while their home was also residence to a number of Woodcock's apprentice jockeys over the years.

== Death ==
Emma Woodcock died in 1983. Tommy Woodcock died at Yarrawonga on 27 April 1985, aged 79, where he was cared for in his last years by his lifelong friends, the Hinchliffe family. His cremated remains were interred at the Springvale Botanical Cemetery in Melbourne.

In 2012, a mother and daughter from Wagga Wagga, Louise Clayton and Tegan Ellis, became aware that the tenure on his ashes and memorial plaque had expired on 31 December 2011. Louise and Tegan, along with Margaret Benson who wrote Tommy Woodcock: The Story of Australia's Most Remarkable Trainer in 1978, collected $465 to pay for Woodcock's ashes to remain in perpetuity in his original resting place.

== Other ==
- Tommy had a cameo appearance in the film Phar Lap, playing a trainer. The role of Phar Lap's strapper in the film was played by Tom Burlinson.
- The strapper of the horse that wins the Melbourne Cup each year gets the Tommy Woodcock Award named in his honour.
