= Go Man Go =

Quarter Horse champion stallion

- Go Man Go being exercised by jockey Robert Strauss, Los Alamitos Racetrack, about 1956
- Breed: Quarter Horse
- Discipline: Racing
- Sire: Top Deck (TB)
- Grandsire: Equestrian (TB)
- Dam: Lightfoot Sis
- Maternal grandsire: Very Wise (TB)
- Sex: Stallion
- Foaled: 1953
- Country: United States
- Color: Roan
- Breeder: J. B. Ferguson

Record
- 47-27-9-3, AAAT speed rating

Earnings
- $86,151.00 (equivalent to $987,600 in 2025)

Major wins
- PCQHRA Futurity, Autumn Championship (twice), Wonder Lad Stakes (twice), Clabbertown G stakes (three times); Winner Take All Stakes; Barbara B Handicap; Champion Stakes; Ruidoso Derby; State Fair Stallion Stakes; Gold Bar Stakes; New Mexico State Fair

Awards
- 1955 World Champion Quarter Running Horse; 1956 World Champion Quarter Running Horse; 1957 World Champion Quarter Running Horse; Superior Race Horse; 1957 High Money Earning Race Horse; 1956 High Money Earning Horse

Honors
- AQHA Hall of Fame
- Last updated on: April 29, 2009.

Go Man Go (1953–1983) was an American Quarter Horse stallion and race horse. He was named World Champion Quarter Running Horse three times in a row, one of only two horses to achieve that distinction. He was considered to be of difficult temperament. While waiting in the starting gate for his first race, he threw his jockey, broke down the gate, and ran alone around the track; he was eventually caught and went on to win the race. During his five years of competition until he retired from racing in 1960, he had 27 wins, earning more than $86,000 (equivalent to $988,000 in 2025).

Neither of Go Man Go's parents raced. His sire (father), the Thoroughbred stallion Top Deck, was bred by the King Ranch. His dam (mother) hailed from Louisiana; Go Man Go is thought to have gained his swiftness on the track from her. For the first years of his racing career, his owner faced difficulty in registering him with the American Quarter Horse Association (AQHA), a matter that remained unresolved until 1958.

Go Man Go sired two All American Futurity winners and seven Champion Quarter Running Horses. He was inducted into the American Quarter Horse Hall of Fame, as were two of his offspring. His daughters also produced several race winners, including Hall of Fame members Kaweah Bar and Rocket Wrangler. The director of racing for the AQHA once compared his impact on Quarter Horse racing and breeding to that of Man o' War in Thoroughbred racing or that of human athletes such as Ben Hogan and Babe Ruth.

== Background and early life ==
Go Man Go was foaled in Wharton, Texas in 1953, as a result of the second breeding between the Thoroughbred stallion Top Deck and the Appendix Quarter Horse mare Lightfoot Sis. Top Deck was bred by the King Ranch, and was unraced. J. B. Ferguson had purchased Lightfoot Sis when her then-owner, Octave Fontenot of Prairie Ronde, Louisiana, decided to get out of the horse breeding business. Ferguson paid $350 for her (equivalent to $4,200 in 2025) and bred her in 1952 to Top Deck (TB), resulting in Go Man Go's birth the next year. (Note: Other sources give a sale price of $300 for Lightfoot Sis.) (Note: A horse's pregnancy lasts 11 months and two weeks.) Ferguson also purchased Top Deck after the stallion injured himself as a yearling.

Lightfoot Sis showed classic short speed in her pedigree, although she was unraced due to an injury as a filly that left her blind in one eye. Her sire was the Thoroughbred stallion Very Wise, and her dam was a Quarter Horse mare named Clear Track. (Note: Quarter Horses are closely related to Thoroughbreds, and many Quarter Horse racehorses are descended mostly from Thoroughbred bloodlines. The AQHA allows the registration of the offspring of a Thoroughbred and a Quarter Horse, but they are registered into a special section of the AQHA's stud book, the Appendix Section. To qualify for full registration in the main section of the stud book, the horse must prove itself in competition, either racing or in the show ring. Once it does so, the horse is considered a full-blooded Quarter Horse. It is possible, and often happens, that an Appendix-registered horse will qualify for a regular registration number and then be bred back to a Thoroughbred, starting the cycle once more. This explains how horses such as Easy Jet or Go Man Go can have many more Thoroughbred ancestors than Quarter Horses but still be considered Quarter Horses.)

Scott Wells, a racing correspondent, wrote in The Speedhorse Magazine that Go Man Go "grew up lean and hard-boned, long-bodied and long-hipped, but not the best-looking horse in the world. Not the best looking, just the best." Go Man Go had a reputation for being difficult to handle. His trainer once told Walt Wiggins, Sr. that Go Man Go was "jes plain mean as a bear most of the time". Throughout his racing career, Go Man Go stayed mean. One of his jockeys, Robert Strauss, recalled later that Go Man Go "was ornery from the day I met him, but he was the greatest horse I ever rode".

== Racing career ==
In his five-year racing career, Go Man Go competed in 47 races. He appeared to take naturally to racing; during his training, he ran off with his rider—his eventual jockey Robert Strauss—before he was supposed to run. As Strauss said, "When we were breaking him, he ran off with me before we ever wanted him to run. I mean, just flat ran off with me." Robert's brother Eldridge, who was the trainer, once worked the colt minus half a shoe and Go Man Go still managed a time of 18.9 seconds for a 350-yard (320 m) distance.

In the moments before his very first race began, Go Man Go flipped over in the starting gate, unseated his rider, crashed through the front, and ran around the whole track. He finally allowed himself to be caught and reloaded into the starting gate and went on to win that race. He won his next five races with a total lead of nine horse-lengths. He faced Vandy's Flash, himself a World Champion Quarter Racing Horse, twelve times. Their last meeting, on September 6, 1959 at Ruidoso Downs, was also Go Man Go's final race, and was the only one of their races won by Vandy's Flash.

Go Man Go won 27 times, placed second 9 times, and was third 3 times. Because he placed so regularly, by the end of his racing career, tracks had difficulty filling races if other racing stables knew he was entered. His race earnings were $86,151 (equivalent to $987,600 in 2025) with 88 AQHA racing points, which earned him a Superior Race Horse award as well as a Race Register of Merit from the AQHA. The best speed rating, or racing grade, he achieved was AAAT, the highest grade awarded at the time. Go Man Go was named World Champion Quarter Running Horse for three years running, from 1955 to 1957. He was the first two-year-old to win the title. He was a multiple stakes winner, and his wins included the Pacific Coast Quarter Racing Association Futurity, LA Autumn Championship, and the Clabbertown G Stakes, which he won three times in a row. At his retirement, he held the world records at 440 yards (400 m) and 350 yards (320 m), as well as age and sex records at 400 yards (370 m). Go Man Go is still the only stallion who has been World Champion Quarter Running Horse three times, and, along with the mare Woven Web (TB), is one of only two horses to be three-time winners of the award.

== Ownership and registration problems ==
In 1955, when Go Man Go was a two-year-old, A.B. Green bragged that he intended to buy the horse from Ferguson. Although Ferguson did not want to sell, he felt he had to at least set a price. After hearing rumors that Green was prepared with a cashier's check for $40,000 (equivalent to $480,700 in 2025), Ferguson set the price at $42,000 cash (equivalent to $504,800 in 2025) and twenty-one breedings to the stallion. To Ferguson's surprise, Green had that much cash available; Ferguson felt compelled to sell Go Man Go. Two years later, at a Los Alamitos race meet, Green claimed that his newest horse, Double Bid, could outrace Go Man Go. This incensed Ferguson, who had just entered Go Man Go's full brother Mr Mackay in a race with Double Bid. Ferguson bet Green $42,000 (equivalent to $481,500 in 2025) against Go Man Go that Mr Mackay would beat Double Bid in the upcoming race. Mr Mackay won the race, and Ferguson regained ownership of Go Man Go. Later in 1960, because he also owned Go Man Go's full brother, father, and mother, he sold Go Man Go to Frank Vessels Sr. and Bill and Harriet Peckham for $125,000 (equivalent to $1,360,400 in 2025). Later, however, all three horses retained by Ferguson died prematurely. (Note: Top Deck died of an illness in 1965, after heroic efforts by vets to save his life. The cause of death of Go Man Go's mother and siblings is not given in the sources.)

Green ran into problems with Go Man Go's registration. At that time, the AQHA had two types of registration, the Appendix and the Tentative. Appendix-registered horses were the offspring of Thoroughbreds and either Tentative-registered Quarter Horses or Appendix-registered Quarter Horses. Go Man Go was originally registered in the Appendix, as his dam was an Appendix-registered mare. The way to advance out of the Appendix into the Tentative registry was to qualify on performance grounds and pass a conformation examination conducted by the AQHA. Go Man Go certainly qualified under the performance criteria, but his conformation was such that he resembled a Thoroughbred more than he resembled a Quarter Horse. Green knew that to increase his stud fees—the price paid for the right to breed a mare to a stallion—Go Man Go needed to acquire a regular registration number instead of his Appendix number. So Green appealed to the Executive Committee of the AQHA, which had the authority to award Tentative numbers to horses regardless of conformation exam results. In both 1956 and 1957, the committee declined to take action, waiting to evaluate the quality of Go Man Go's first foals before making a decision. Finally, in 1958, they awarded Go Man Go number 82,000 in the Tentative registry.

== Breeding career and legacy ==
Retired to the breeding shed, Go Man Go early on proved his worth as a stallion. Of his first foal crop, born in 1958, three reached the finals of the All American Futurity: Mr Meyers, Dynago Miss and Angie Miss. (Note: They finished fifth, sixth and eighth, respectively.) His stud fee in 1960 was $500 (equivalent to $5,442 in 2025), but by 1963 it had risen to $2,500 (equivalent to $26,291 in 2025). He sired 942 foals, of which 552 earned their Race Register of Merit. Seventy-two of his offspring were awarded a Superior Race Horse award. Among his get, or offspring, were Go Josie Go, Dynago Miss, Duplicate Copy, Story Man, and Hustling Man. His daughter Goetta won the All American Futurity and was inducted into the American Quarter Horse Hall of Fame. Another daughter, Ought To Go was also inducted into the AQHA Hall of Fame. Two grandget were also inducted into the AQHA Hall of Fame: Kaweah Bar and Rocket Wrangler. Eight of his offspring won Champion Quarter Running Horse awards. His entry listing his offspring who won Race Register of Merits in the Quarter Racing Digest covers five full pages plus part of another. As a broodmare sire, or maternal grandsire, his daughters have produced Rocket Wrangler, Mr Kid Charge, Kaweah Bar, and Go Together. As of April 2008, his offspring had earned over $7,000,000 on the racetrack.

As a breeding stallion, Go Man Go continued to have a reputation as a scoundrel, although Kathlyn Green, wife of A. B. Green, disputed that image. She said that he liked to have his lip tugged, and would lean over the stall door waiting for people to come along and tug on it for him. However, she said of him "he absolutely hated getting his feet dirty". Go Man Go passed through several hands after Green owned him, including Les Gosselin, Frank Vessels, and Harriett Peckham, who was his owner by 1972. In 1967, when Vessels sold his half-interest in Go Man Go to Briarwood Farms, the deal was said to be a record price for a Quarter Horse. Go Man Go died in 1983 and was buried near the headquarters of the Buena Suerte Ranch in Roswell, New Mexico. His crown-shaped granite headstone is engraved: "Go Man Go, The King."

Go Man Go was inducted into the American Quarter Horse Hall of Fame in 1990. A further honor was the naming of a stakes race after him, the Grade I Go Man Go Handicap run in September at Los Alamitos. Walt Wiggins, a racing commentator and author, said of Go Man Go: "He was a brilliant speedhorse, some say the fastest ever. He was wild and reckless, a rogue at first, and often a clown who seldom saw the uniqueness of his talents or the seriousness of his commission. He had intrinsic greatness and couldn't care less." Dan Essary, who was Director of Racing for the AQHA for many years, described Go Man Go's impact on the Quarter Horse breed as "He was to Quarter Horse racing what Babe Ruth was to baseball, what Ben Hogan was to Golf and what Man o'War was to Thoroughbred racing. Horses may have run faster, and horses have earned more money, but the fame of Go Man Go lingers."

== Pedigree ==
Pennant (TB)
Equipoise (TB)
Swinging (TB)
Equestrian (TB)
Man o' War (TB)
Frilette (TB)
*Frillery (TB) (Note: An asterisk means the horse was imported into North America.)
Top Deck (TB) (Note: (TB) is an abbreviation for Thoroughbred.)
*Chicle (TB)
Chicaro (TB)
Wendy (TB)
River Boat (TB)
*Sir Gallahad 3rd (TB)
Last Boat (TB)
Taps (TB)
Go Man Go
Mentor (TB)
Wise Counsellor (TB)
Rustle (TB)
Very Wise (TB)
*Ormond (TB)
Omona (TB)
Simona (TB)
Lightfoot Sis
Dewey (TB)
The Dun Horse
Mais
Clear Track
Old DJ
Ella
mare by Beauregard
