= Easy Jet (horse) =

Quarter Horse champion race stallion

- Easy Jet
- Breed: American Quarter Horse
- Discipline: Racing
- Sire: Jet Deck
- Grandsire: Moon Deck
- Dam: Lena's Bar (TB)
- Maternal grandsire: Three Bars (TB)
- Sex: Stallion
- Foaled: 1967
- Country: United States
- Color: Sorrel
- Breeder: Walter Merrick

Record
- 38–27–7–2, AAAT speed rating

Earnings
- $445,721.00 (equivalent to $3,695,200 in 2025)

Major wins
- 1969 All American Futurity; All American Quarter Horse Congress Futurity; Kansas Futurity; Laddie Stakes; Rocky Mountain Quarter Horse Derby; Sunland Park Fall Futurity; Blue Ribbon Futurity; Columbus Triple Crown Futurity; Lubbock Downs Futurity; Raton Derby; Rocky Mountain Quarter Horse Futurity; Colorado Wonderland Handicap

Awards
- 1969 World Champion Quarter Running Horse, 1970 Champion Quarter Running Stallion

Honors
- American Quarter Horse Hall of Fame
- Last updated on: April 29, 2009.

Easy Jet (1967–1992) was a racing champion American Quarter Horse. He was one of only two horses to have been a member of the American Quarter Horse Association (AQHA) Hall of Fame as well as being an offspring of members. Easy Jet won the 1969 All American Futurity, the highest race for Quarter Horse racehorses, and was named World Champion Quarter Race Horse in the same year. He earned the highest speed rating awarded at the time—AAAT. After winning 27 out of his 38 races in two years of racing, he retired from the race track and became a breeding stallion.

As a sire, he was the first All American Futurity winner to sire an All American Futurity winner, and went on to sire three winners of that race, and nine Champion Quarter Running Horses. Ultimately, his ownership and breeding rights were split into 60 shares worth $500,000 each—a total of $30 million. By 1993, the year after his death, his foals had earned more than $25 million on the racetrack.

== Early life ==
Longtime Quarter Horse breeder and racehorse owner Walter Merrick of Sayre, Oklahoma, bred Easy Jet from two future AQHA Hall of Fame members, Jet Deck and Thoroughbred mare Lena's Bar in 1967. His dam, or mother, Lena's Bar, had produced a small number of other offspring, but Easy Jet was her last; she died shortly after he was weaned, or removed from his mother's milk. Both of his parents were descended from Three Bars, who was the sire of Lena's Bar and the grandsire of Jet Deck's dam. Easy Jet is one of only two horses in the American Quarter Horse Hall of Fame to have both parents in the Hall of Fame; his two grandsires, Moon Deck and Three Bars, are also in the Hall of Fame. (Note: The other horse of this distinction is Doc O'Lena.)

Easy Jet was of sorrel color, a light yellowish-red. When fully grown, he stood about 15.3 hands high (63 inches; 160 cm) and weighed about 1,300 pounds (590 kg). He had a large star and a stripe on his face.

Of Easy Jet's stamina and busy training regimen, Merrick said, "I guess he ate at night; I don't know when else. It was unbelievable the amount of energy he had". Training for the race track generally begins when a horse is a long yearling—between one and a half and two years of age. Easy Jet was so easy to train that Merrick decided to oversee the training himself rather than send the horse away to a professional trainer. In a practice race at the ranch, Merrick matched the yearling against Jet Smooth. Although his elder brother had the advantage of previous race experience, Easy Jet won the 350-yard (320 m) race. Easy Jet's performance prompted Merrick to enter him in a yearling race at Blue Ribbon Downs, which the colt won by more than a length. (Note: Yearling races are unofficial and do not count towards American Quarter Horse Association records.)

== Racing career ==
Easy Jet raced for two years, starting 38 races. He won 27 of his races, came in second seven times and third twice, and placed below third only twice, with race earnings totaling $445,721 (equivalent to $3,695,200 in 2025). He earned an AQHA Superior Race Horse award along with his Race Register of Merit. A Superior Race horse must have earned at least 200 AQHA racing points by winning races, and even more in stakes races. A Race Register of Merit is the lowest level of racing award earned from the AQHA, and is gained when a horse attains a speed rating of 80 in a race, whether or not it wins the race. His best speed rating was AAAT, which was the highest grade awarded at the time he was racing. Over his two-year career, he won 12 stakes races, and placed second in four and third in one.

In 1969, his first official year on the track, he won the All American Futurity and eight other stakes races. In winning the All American, he led from the start on a sloppy, muddy track. His jockey, Willie Lovell, explained that he needed to do very little to win: "In the stretch, when I saw Easy Jet had it, I let him run his own race. All I had to do was just sit there and let him roll." His time of 20.46 seconds to cover 400 yards (370 m) was remarkable considering that three days of rain before the start of the race had turned the track into a muddy quagmire. (Note: For reference, the current world record for the distance, set in 2013, is 18.613 seconds.) At another stakes, the Ribbon Futurity at Sallisaw, Oklahoma, Easy Jet won by three-quarters of a length and set a new track record of 16.92 seconds for 330 yards (300 m). The only time in 1969 he did not finish first, second, or third, he had issues in the starting gate, false-started, broke some teeth loose against the front of the gate, and was struggling to stand up again when the gates opened; he still managed to finish fifth out of ten horses.

At the end of the 1969 racing season, he was named World Champion Quarter Running Horse, Champion Quarter Running Stallion, and Champion Quarter Running Two-Year Old Colt by the AQHA. He was also the highest money-earning horse and only the fourth two-year-old to be named World Champion. During his first year of racing, he started 26 times, won 22 and placed (came in second) in another three. Most two-year-old Quarter Horses race on average under five times in their first year of racing, and the average for all ages is just over five starts per year. Many people criticized Merrick for starting Easy Jet so often. Merrick said, however, "You had to run him about once every ten days or he'd have got so high you couldn't hardly stand to be around him. As long as we were going to run him, we figured we might as well make it count for something." Despite all of the starts, Easy Jet had enough energy to be difficult to handle; in this respect, he was considered high-spirited rather than mean.

In 1970, he started 12 times, won five times, placed second four times, and earned third place twice. His only unplaced finish was in the Rainbow Derby finals, where he came in dead last. Before he started racing that year, he stood at stud to a full book of mares, breeding as many mares as his owners would allow, which limited his racing time. During the Rocky Mountain Quarter Horse Derby at Centennial Park in Denver, Colorado, on October 4, 1970, which Easy Jet won without ever relinquishing the lead, the stallion became the highest-earning Quarter Horse racer of all time, with earnings of more than $440,000 (equivalent to $3,647,815 in 2025). At the end of the year, he was named Champion Quarter Running Stallion and Champion Quarter Running Three-Year Old Colt.

== Retirement and career at stud ==
Before his retirement from racing in 1970, Easy Jet had already started standing at stud, returning to the track only after the breeding season. In 1971, his first foals arrived. His offspring began racing in 1973 and soon put Easy Jet on the AQHA Leading Sires of Race Winners list. With their success, his stud fee, or the cost of breeding a mare to him, rose from $2,000 (equivalent to $15,900 in 2025) in 1971 to $5,000 (equivalent to $36,263 in 2025) in 1973; by 1980, it was $30,000 (equivalent to $117,200 in 2025).

In 1971, Merrick sold a half-interest in Easy Jet and his full brother Jet Smooth to Joe McDermott, and five years later, in 1976, the partners sold Easy Jet to the Buena Suerte Ranch for $3.57 million (equivalent to $20,198,700 in 2025). Later, after two of the partners in the ranch died unexpectedly, Merrick re-purchased Easy Jet and bought a controlling share in the ranch. In 1980, the stallion was syndicated for $30 million (equivalent to $117,225,400 in 2025), a record amount at the time. The syndicate had 50 shares, each costing $600,000 (equivalent to $2,344,500 in 2025). The oil bust of the 1980s, and changes in US tax laws affecting horse operations, led to financial problems for the horse market in general and the syndicate, which led to financial difficulties for Merrick and resulted in many changes of ownership for Easy Jet until the death of the champion in 1992.

After retiring to stud full-time, he had a very successful career. He became the first All American Futurity winner to sire another winner when his daughter Easy Date won the All American Futurity in 1974. Easy Date was later named 1975 World Champion Quarter Running Horse. He also sired Pie In the Sky, the 1979 All American Futurity winner, and Mr Trucka Jet, the 1985 All American Futurity winner. More than 1,500 of his offspring earned their AQHA Race Register of Merit, and nine became World Champion Quarter Running Horses. Besides the horses already mentioned, the champions include My Easy Credit, Extra Easy, Easily Smashed, Easy Angel, Easy Move, and Megahertz. His foal Sunset Gallant Jet was the 1979 and 1980 AQHA High Point Cutting & Chariot Racing Co-Champion. At various points in time, Easy Jet has led the AQHA's lists of All-time leading sires of sires, All-time leading sires of Register of Merit qualifiers, All-time leading sires of stakes winners, and All-time leading broodmare sires. In March 2008, he still led the list of All-time leading sires of Quarter Horse racehorses by winners, and on the corresponding list ordered by earnings, he ranks fourth. As a broodmare sire, or maternal grandsire, of racehorses, Easy Jet led the All-time leading lists by winners in March 2008, and the same list ordered by earnings had him second. As of 2008, his offspring had earned over $26,000,000 on the racetrack. In total, he sired 2,507 foals in 25 years of breeding.

Easy Jet was euthanized in 1992 due to laminitis, a disease of the hoof. He was buried in his paddock on Walter Merrick's 14 Ranch near Sayre, Oklahoma. Merrick was unable to bring himself to see the horse before he was put down. He said, "I couldn't go, I just couldn't see him like that. He was too good a friend." Easy Jet was inducted into the AQHA Hall of Fame in 1993.

== Pedigree ==
Equestrian (TB)
Top Deck (TB)
River Boat (TB)
Moon Deck
Peace Pipe (TB)
Moonlight Night
Mae
Jet Deck
Three Bars (TB)
Barred
Ready
Miss Night Bar
Midnight Jr
Belle of Midnight
Myrna Loy
Easy Jet
Midway (TB)
Percentage (TB)
Gossip Avenue (TB)
Three Bars (TB)
Luke McLuke (TB)
Myrtle Dee (TB)
Civil Maid (TB)
Lena's Bar (TB)
*Gino (TB)
Gray Dream (TB)
Dark Love (TB)
Lena Valenti (TB)
Percentage (TB)
Perhobo (TB)
Homebody (TB)
