= Rocket Bar =

20th-century American Thoroughbred racehorse and sire

- Sire: Three Bars
- Grandsire: Percentage
- Dam: Golden Rocket
- Damsire: Cartago
- Sex: Stallion
- Foaled: 1951
- Country: United States
- Colour: Chestnut
- Record: 36 starts: 16-6-5; AA speed rating
- Earnings: $22,904.00

Major wins
- Phoenix Gold Cup Handicap (twice)

Awards
- AQHA Race Register of Merit

Honours
- American Quarter Horse Hall of Fame

Rocket Bar (1951–1970) was a registered Thoroughbred stallion that made his mark on the Quarter Horse racetracks and as a breeding stallion.

== Life ==
Rocket Bar was a registered Thoroughbred son of Three Bars that foaled in Arizona in 1951. He raced until 1958, when he was sold and started a career in the breeding shed.

== Racing career ==
On the Quarter Horse tracks, Rocket Bar started once and came in third. He reached an AA speed rating in that one start, earning him a Race Register of Merit with the American Quarter Horse Association (or AQHA). On the Thoroughbred tracks, he started 35 times in six years. From those starts, he won 16 times, came in second 6 times and was third 4 times. He earned a total of $22,904.00 and won the 1956 and 1957 Phoenix Gold Cup Handicap.]

== Breeding record ==
During Rocket Bar's breeding career, he sired AQHA Supreme Champions Fire Rocket, He Rocket, and Sugar Rocket along with other notable horses including Rocket Wrangler, Osage Rocket, Mr Tinky Bar, and Top Rockette.

== Death and honors ==
Rocket Bar died on October 23, 1970, after colic surgery.

Rocket Bar was inducted into the AQHA Hall of Fame in 1992.

== Sire line tree ==
- Rocket Bar
  - Mr Tinky Bar
  - Nug Rock
  - Fire Rocket
  - Sugar Rocket
  - Rocket Wrangler
    - Dash For Cash
      - Cash Rate
      - Calyx
      - First Down Dash
        - Dash Ta Fame
        - Royal Quick Dash
        - Dash Thru Traffic
        - A Classic Dash
        - A Ransom
        - The Down Side
        - Ocean Runaway
        - Wave Carver
        - No Secrets Here
        - Half Pipe
        - Oceans Apart
      - Cash Legacy
      - Dashing Val
      - Dash For Perks
        - Dash N Sparks
      - Takin On The Cash
      - Some Dasher
  - He Rocket

== Pedigree ==
Ballot
Midway
Thirty-third
Percentage
Bulse
Gossip Avenue
Rosewood
Three Bars
Ultimus
Luke McLuke
Midge
Myrtle Dee
Patriot
Civil Maid
Civil Rule
Rocket Bar
=St. Amant
*Atwell
=Doro
Cartago
Heno
Polly H
Polly
Golden Rocket
Runnymede
Morvich
Hymir
Morshion
Non Pareil
Cushion
Hassock
