= Billy Elliot (jockey) =

Australian jockey

Billy Elliot (16 October 1907 – 21 September 1941) was an Australian jockey. He rode the Thoroughbred racehorse Phar Lap on seven occasions for seven wins, including his last race in the 1932 Agua Caliente Handicap in Mexico. Billy Elliot built a solid double-brick home at 198 Kambrook Road Caulfield South, not far from Caulfield racecourse, and it stands to this day. Modern in its time, it had a hydraulic operated clothesline plus pop-up lawn sprinklers and a fishpond out the back yard. In 1941, Billy Elliot died after falling ill following breaking his leg in an incident at the Caulfield racecourse.

== Bibliography ==
- Armstrong, Geoff and Peter Thompson (2005). Melbourne Cup 1930: How Phar Lap Won Australia's Greatest Race. London: Allen and Unwin.
