= Moon Deck =

Quarter Horse racehorse and sire

- Breed: Quarter Horse
- Discipline: Racing
- Sire: Top Deck (TB)
- Grandsire: Equestrian (TB)
- Dam: Moonlight Night
- Maternal grandsire: Peace Pipe (TB)
- Sex: Stallion
- Foaled: 1950
- Died: January 13, 1974
- Country: United States
- Color: Brown
- Breeder: J. B. Ferguson

Record
- 62 starts: 11-11-6; AAA speed rating

Earnings
- $22,087.00

Major wins
- Los Alamitos Championship; Albuquerque Derby

Honors
- American Quarter Horse Hall of Fame

Moon Deck (1950–1974) was an influential Quarter Horse sire and racehorse.

== Life ==
Moon Deck was a brown stallion foaled on March 28, 1950 at J. B. Ferguson's Wharton, Texas ranch, the son of Top Deck (TB) and a Quarter Horse race mare named Moonlight Night. Moonlight Night was bred in Louisiana, a daughter of Peace Pipe (TB) and out of a descendant of Dewey (TB) and Doc Horn (TB) named Mae.

== Racing career ==
Moon Deck started 62 times in six years. He won 11 of his races, placed second 11 times, and was third six times. He earned 75 racing points with the American Quarter Horse Association (or AQHA), qualifying for the Superior Race Horse Award. His highest speed rating was AAA. After six years of racing, Moon Deck was sold to James V. A. Carter, for $9000.

== Breeding record ==
During his career at stud, he sired such horses as Jet Deck, Top Moon, Solar Fancy, Cue Deck, Caprideck, and Jet Too.

== Death and honors ==
Moon Deck died of a twisted intestine in the ownership of Don Keith and J. Ralph Bell on January 13, 1974.

Moon Deck was inducted into the AQHA Hall of Fame in 1996.

== Sire line tree ==
- Moon Deck
  - Caprideck
  - Cue Deck
  - Jet Deck
    - Jet Smooth
    - Easy Jet
      - Sunset Gallant Jet
      - Megahertz
      - My Easy Credit
      - Easy Move
      - Extra Easy
      - Pie In The Sky
      - Easily Smashed
      - Mr Trucka Jet
    - Jet Threat
    - Jet Charger
    - Tony B Deck
    - Jet Royale
    - Mr Jet West
  - Top Moon
    - Moon Lark
  - Jet Too

== Pedigree ==
Pennant (TB)
Equipoise (TB)
Swinging (TB)
Equestrian (TB)
Man o' War (TB)
Frilette (TB)
*Frillery (TB)
Top Deck (TB)
*Chicle (TB)
Chicaro (TB)
Wendy (TB)
River Boat (TB)
*Sir Gallahad III (TB)
Last Boat (TB)
Taps (TB)
Moon Deck
=Swynford (TB)
*Under Fire (TB)
=Startling (TB)
Peace Pipe (TB)
His Majesty (TB)
Loving Cup (TB)
Golden Drop (TB)
Moonlight Night
Dewey (TB)
The Dun Horse
Mais
Mae
Doc Horn (TB)
La Bergeron
mare by Old DJ
