= Champion of Champions (horse race) =

Horse race in California, US

- Class: Grade 1
- Location: Los Alamitos Race Course; Cypress, California, USA
- Inaugurated: 1972
- Race type: Quarter Horse

Race information
- Distance: 440 Yards (1/4 Mile)
- Surface: Dirt
- Track: Straight
- Qualification: 3-year-olds and Up
- Purse: US$750,000

The Champion of Champions is a stakes race annually held at Los Alamitos Race Course in Cypress, California. It is the championship race for Quarter Horses.

The field is determined by the winners of qualifying races held around the United States. The races currently are:

- Los Alamitos Winter Championship,
- Remington Park Championship,
- Vessels Maturity,
- All American Derby,
- Mildred Vessels Memorial,
- Robert L. Boniface Los Alamitos Invitational Championship,
- Los Alamitos Super Derby, and the
- Bank of America Challenge Championship.

The two fastest times in the Z. Wayne Griffin Directors Trials receive the last two berths. The winner of the Go Man Go Handicap qualifies as the first alternate if one of the qualifying race winners does not compete.

The Champion of Champion was not held in 2014 due to concerns over the widespread use of clenbuterol, a drug not permitted at Los Alamitos.

== Records ==
Speed record:

- :20.939 - Apollitical Jess (2010)

Most wins by a jockey:

- 4 - Jerry Nicodemus (1976, 1977, 1980, 1981)
- 4 - Bruce Pilkenton (1983, 1988, 1983, 1984)

Most wins by a trainer:

- 9 - Blane Schvaneveldt (1978, 1980, 1985, 1987, 1990, 1992, 1993, 1994, 1995)

Most wins by a horse:

- 3 - Refrigerator (1992, 1993, 1994)
- 2 - Dash For Cash (1976, 1977)
- 2 - SLM Big Daddy (1997, 1998)
- 2 - Tailor Fit (1999, 2001)
- 2 - Apollitical Pence (2020, 2021)
- 2 - Empressum (2022, 2024)

== Winners of the Champion of Champions ==
Year	Winner	Jockey	Trainer	Owner	Time
2025	Fdd Dreams	Luis Martinez	Manuel Rodolfo Rodriguez	La Feliz Montana Ranch LLC	21.40
2024	Empressum	Rodrigo Vallejo	Heath Taylor	Jeff Jones and Steve Holt	21.30
2023	Flash Bak	Francisco Calderon	Heath Taylor	Valeriano Racing	21.57
2022	Empressum	Rodrigo Vallejo	Heath Taylor	Jeff Jones and Steve Holt	21.089
2021	Apollitical Pence	Armando Cervantes	Monty Arrosa	Dunn Ranch	21.352
2020	Apollitical Pence	Raul Valenzuela	John Cooper	Dunn Ranch and Valeriano Racing Stables LLC	21.442
2019	He Looks Hot	Vinny Bednar	Scott Willoughby	Ed Allred	21.38
2018	Bodacious Eagle	Cody Jensen	Justin Joiner	Johnny Trotter	21.472
2017	My Pyc To You	Carlos M. Huerta	Jose Antonio Flores	Flores, Jose Antonio, Van Amburgh, Denise and Van Amburgh, Ronald	21.61
2016	Zoomin For Spuds	Jesus Aylala	Monty Arrossa	Jim Walker	21.30
2015	Heza Dasha Fire	Cruz Mendez	Jose Antonio Flores	S-Quarter K LLC	21.20
2014	not run				
2013	Last to Fire	Eduardo Nicasio	Jose De La Torre	Jesus Avila & Jesus Cuevas	21.10
2012	Rylees Boy	Ramon Sanchez	Paul Jones	Lorena Velazquez Rodriguez	21.38
2011	Good Reason SA	Eduardo Nicasio	Paul Jones	Gianni Samaja	21.44
2010	Apollitical Jess	Eduardo Nicasio	Juan Aleman	Rancho El Cabresto	20.939
2009	Freaky	Francisco Rubio	Adan Farias	Armando Aguirre	21.06
2008	Jess You and I	Alejandro Luna	Jamie Gomez	Double Bar S Ranch	:20.94
2007	Blues Girl Too	Saul Ramirez	Joe Bassett	Lucky Seven Ranch	:21.13
2006	Wave Carver	Ramon Sanchez	Paul Jones	Vaughn Cook, Dan Lucas, Muller Racing and Vessels Stallion Farm	:21.18
2005	Ocean Runaway	Alex Bautista	Denny Ekins	Muller Racing LLC	:21.20
2004	Cash For Kas	G. R. Carter	Paul Jones	E.D. Calvert	:21.28
2003	The Down Side	Ramon Sanchez	Paul Jones	Johnny T.L. Jones, R.D. Hubbard and Toby Keith	:21.19
2002	Whosleavingwho	Joe Badilla	Paul Jones	Jim Geiler and Kim Kessinger	:21.27
2001	Tailor Fit	Alvin Brossette	Janet VanBebber	Betty Jane Burlin	:21.47
2000	A Ransom	Carlos Bautista	Connie Hall	John and Kathie Bobenrieth	:21.46
1999	Tailor Fit	Steve Fuller	Steve VanBebber	Betty Jane Burlin	:21.46
1998	SLM Big Daddy	Jacky Martin	Don Mourning	Steve and Lindsey Mitchell	:21.53
1997	SLM Big Daddy	Jacky Martin	Don Mourning	Steve and Lindsey Mitchell	:21.20
1996	Dashing Folly	Tami Purcell	Donna McArthur	Jaramar Ltd.	:21.70
1995	My Debut	Roman Figueroa	Blane Schvaneveldt	C.R. Potts	:21.74
1994	Refrigerator	Bruce Pilkenton	Blane Schvaneveldt	Jim and Marilyn Helzer	:21.67
1993	Refrigerator	Bruce Pilkenton	Blane Schvaneveldt	Jim and Marilyn Helzer	:21.59
1992	Refrigerator	Kip Didericksen	Blane Schvaneveldt	Jim and Marilyn Helzer	:21.37
1991	Special Leader	Kenneth Hart	Mike Robbins	Joe Kirk Fulton	:21.39
1990	Dash for Speed	Kip Didericksen	Blane Schvaneveldt	Bob Blakeman and Tom Bradbury	:21.32
1989	See Me Do It	Larry Layton	Bobby Turner	Jean Dillard	:21.47
1988	Shawnes Favorite	Bruce Pilkenton	Bob Baffert	Salinas Ranch	21.63
1987	First Down Dash	James Lackey	Blane Schvaneveldt	Vessels Stallion Farm	:21.41
1986	Gold Coast Express	Danny Cardoza	Bob Baffert	Bill and Louella Mitchell	:21.56
1985	Cash Rate	James Lackey	Blane Schvaneveldt	B.F. Phillips Jr. and Minnie Rhea Wood	:21.31
1984	Dashs Dream	Danny Cardoza	Mike Robbins	Joe Kirk Fulton	21.84
1983	Justanold Love	Bruce Pilkenton	Charles Cascio	J.E. Jumonville Jr.	:21.68
1982	Sgt. Pepper Feature	John Creager	Mike Robbins	Tom Neff	:21.59
1981	Denim N Diamonds	Jerry Nicodemus	Don Farris	R.D. Hubbard	:21.74
1980	Lady Juno	Jerry Nicodemus	Blane Schvaneveldt	Ivan Ashment	:21.59
1979	Mr. Doty Bars	Robert Adair	John Cooper	George and Shirley Loeb	:21.78
1978	Miss Thermolark	Kenneth Hart	Blane Schvaneveldt	Ronny Schliep	:21.66
1977	Dash For Cash	Jerry Nicodemus	Charles Cascio	B.F. Phillips Jr. and The King Ranch of Texas	:21.63
1976	Dash For Cash	Jerry Nicodemus	Charles Cascio	B.F. Phillips Jr. and The King Ranch of Texas	:21.17
1975	Easy Date	Donald Knight	James McArthur	Walter Merrick	:21.71
1974	Don Guerro	Robert Adair	Don Francisco	Robert Mitchum	:21.73
1973	Charger Bar	James Dreyer	Wayne Charlton	Ed Allred and Kenneth Wright	:22.15
1972	Mr. Jet Moore	Terry Lipham	Earl Holmes	Bob Moore	:21.86

== Notes ==
In 2010, Apollitical Jess set a new track record with a time of :20.939. Prior in 2008, Jess You and I set a new track record, becoming the first to break the 21 second barrier in the race when he recorded a time of :20.94. The second-place finisher, Little Bit of Baja, also eclipsed the old world record turning in a time of :20.97. In 2009, Freaky ran in 21.06 and in 2013 Last to Fire's time was :21.09. The previous record of :21.13 had been established in the 2007 running won by World Champion Blues Girl Too, which broke Dash For Cash's 1976 track record of :21.17.

2007's victory by Blues Girl Too made her the sport's all-time leading female earner.

2005's renewal saw the first time the first four finishers of the Champion of Champions were three-year-olds.

1993 saw Refrigerator become the sport's all-time leading money earner with his victory.

During the summer of 1986, eight-year-old Sgt Pepper Feature was claimed for $12,500 and immediately retired. The superstar gelding ran fifth in his 62nd race, retiring with just over $900,000 in career earnings. The group who claimed him includes Bob Baffert and Mike Pegram.

1983's running was the first running to feature Grade I status.

1979 saw Mr Doty Bars win at 22-1.

2017 saw Mr PYC To You win at 60-1.
