= Gallant Sir =

American Thoroughbred racehorse

- Sire: Sir Gallahad III
- Grandsire: Teddy
- Dam: Sun Spot
- Damsire: Omar Khayyam
- Sex: Stallion
- Foaled: 1929
- Country: United States
- Colour: Bay
- Breeder: Claiborne Farm
- Owner: Northway Stable
- Trainer: Elwood L. Fitzgerald
- Record: 42: 16-9-3
- Earnings: $115,965

Major wins
- Latonia Championship Stakes (1932); Maryland Handicap (1932); Agua Caliente Handicap (1933, 1934); Hawthorne Handicap; Detroit Inaugural Handicap

Gallant Sir (foaled 1929) was an American Thoroughbred racehorse bred by renowned horseman Arthur B. Hancock at his Claiborne Farm in Paris, Kentucky. He was sired by the outstanding American Champion sire, Sir Gallahad III. His dam, Sun Spot, was a daughter of Omar Khayyam, the 1917 Kentucky Derby winner and Co-Champion 3-Yr-Old Colt.

Norman W. Church purchased Gallant Sir and raced him under his Northway Stable. Trainer E. L. "Lying Fitz" Fitzgerald trained the horse. In the 1932 Kentucky Derby, Gallant Sir was ridden by Hall of Fame jockey George Woolf but was never in the race. He broke from the 19th spot and finished eighth, more than a dozen lengths behind winner Burgoo King. After that, though, the colt began to win consistently and by 1933 he won eleven straight races in the American midwest until finishing second to Equipoise in the Hawthorne Gold Cup Handicap.

Gallant Sir won two consecutive runnings of the Agua Caliente Handicap, the first as a four-year-old in 1933 when he broke the Agua Caliente track record set by Phar Lap the previous year. He was retired to stud in 1935 but met with limited success as a sire.
