= Agua Caliente Handicap =

Mexican horse race in Tijuana (1917–1934; 1938; 1958)

- Class: discontinued stakes
- Location: Agua Caliente Racetrack; Tijuana, Mexico
- Inaugurated: 1917
- Race type: Thoroughbred - Flat racing

Race information
- Distance: 11/16 miles (8.5 furlongs)
- Surface: Dirt
- Track: left-handed
- Qualification: Three-year-olds and up

The Agua Caliente Handicap is a defunct thoroughbred horse race that was once the premier event at Agua Caliente Racetrack in Tijuana, Baja California, Mexico, and the richest race in North America. Inaugurated in 1917 as the Coffroth Handicap, it was named in honor of James Wood Coffroth, President of the Lower California Jockey Club. It was run at the Tijuana Racetrack through 1929 after which it was hosted by the newly built Agua Caliente Racetrack.

In the 1930s the event offered a $100,000 purse which drew high-profile stable owners from the United States and Canada such as Adolph B. Spreckels, J. K. L. Ross, Charles Howard, Suzanne Mason and the Seagram family stables. Among the champions to win the race were Round Table, Gallant Sir, who won it twice and in record time, Seabiscuit, and Phar Lap, who won the 1932 race, ridden by Billy Elliot, in track record time. It was the great Australian champion's only North American appearance.

After the 1934 racing season, the government of Mexico outlawed gambling until 1938 by which time the track had been effectively replaced by the new Santa Anita Park in Arcadia, California, United States, the choice of convenience for owners as a place to train, stable, and race their horses. The Agua Caliente Handicap was only run twice more: in 1938, when it was won by Seabiscuit, and in 1958, when it was won by Round Table.

Distances:

- 1917–1934 : 1¼ miles
- 1938 : 11/8 miles
- 1958 : 11/16 miles

== Records ==
Speed record: (at 1¼ miles)

- Gallant Sir in 1933, 2:02 3/5

Most wins:

- 2 - Gallant Sir (1933, 1934)

Most wins by a jockey:

- no jockey won this race more than once

Most wins by a trainer:

- 2 - Harry M. Unna (1921, 1929)
- 2 - Elwood L. Fitzgerald (1933, 1934)

Most wins by an owner:

- 2 - Northway Stable (1933, 1934)

== Winners ==
Year	Winner	Age	Jockey	Trainer	Owner	Dist. (Miles)	Time	Win$
1958	Round Table	4	Bill Shoemaker	William Molter	Kerr Stable	11/16 M	1:41.20	$31,800
1939	1957	Race not held						
1938	Seabiscuit	5	Noel Richardson	Tom Smith	Charles S. Howard	11/8 M	1:50.40	$8,600
1935	1937	Race not held						
1934	Gallant Sir	5	Red Pollard	Elwood L. Fitzgerald	Northway Stable (Norman W. Church)	11/4 M	2:02.80	$23,300
1933	Gallant Sir	4	George Woolf	Elwood L. Fitzgerald	Northway Stable (Norman W. Church)	11/4 M	2:02.60	$24,200
1932	Phar Lap	6	Billy Elliot	Tommy Woodcock	David Davis & Harry R. Telford	11/4 M	2:02.80	$50,050
1931	Mike Hall	7	Steve O'Donnell	Walter W. Taylor	Robert M. Eastman	11/4 M	2:03.00	
1930	Victorian	5	George Ellis	J. Thomas Taylor	Warm Stable (Suzanne Mason & W. A. Hanger)	11/4 M	2:03.20	$98,400
1929	Golden Prince	5	Jack Parmalee	Harry M. Unna	Harry M. Unna	13/16 M	2:03.60	$98,250
1928	Crystal Pennant	4	Tommy Luther	Earl Linnell	R. C. Stable (Walter H. Hoffman)	11/4 M	2:05.00	$92,700
1927	Sir Harry	3	Ovila Bourassa	William H. Bringloe	Seagram Stables	11/4 M	2:03.40	$84,400
1926	Carlaris	3	Willie Munden	Fred Kraft	Chula Vista Stable	11/4 M	2:02.60	$70,700
1925	Atherstone	5	Harry Wakoff	David R. McDaniel	Mrs. Victor Vivaudou	11/4 M	2:07.40	$56,425
1924	Runstar	5	Edgar Barnes	Charles W. Carroll	Adolph B. Spreckels	11/4 M	2:05.40	$43,650
1923	Rebuke	4	William Pool	Henry McDaniel	J. K. L. Ross	11/4 M	2:06.20	$29,475
1922	Mulciber	4	Jack Huntamer	Gribley R. Allen	Gribley R. Allen	11/4 M	2:06.40	$15,000
1921	Be Frank	5	W. McIntyre	Harry M. Unna	Bronx Stable (George P. Fuller)	11/4 M	2:05.60	$14,775
1918	1920	Race not held						
1917	Sasin	4	Willie Kelsay	Clarence Buxton	Clarence Buxton	11/4 M	2:22.00	$4,000
