= Los Alamitos Race Course =

Horse racing track in Cypress, California

Coordinates: 33°48′31″N 118°02′37″W

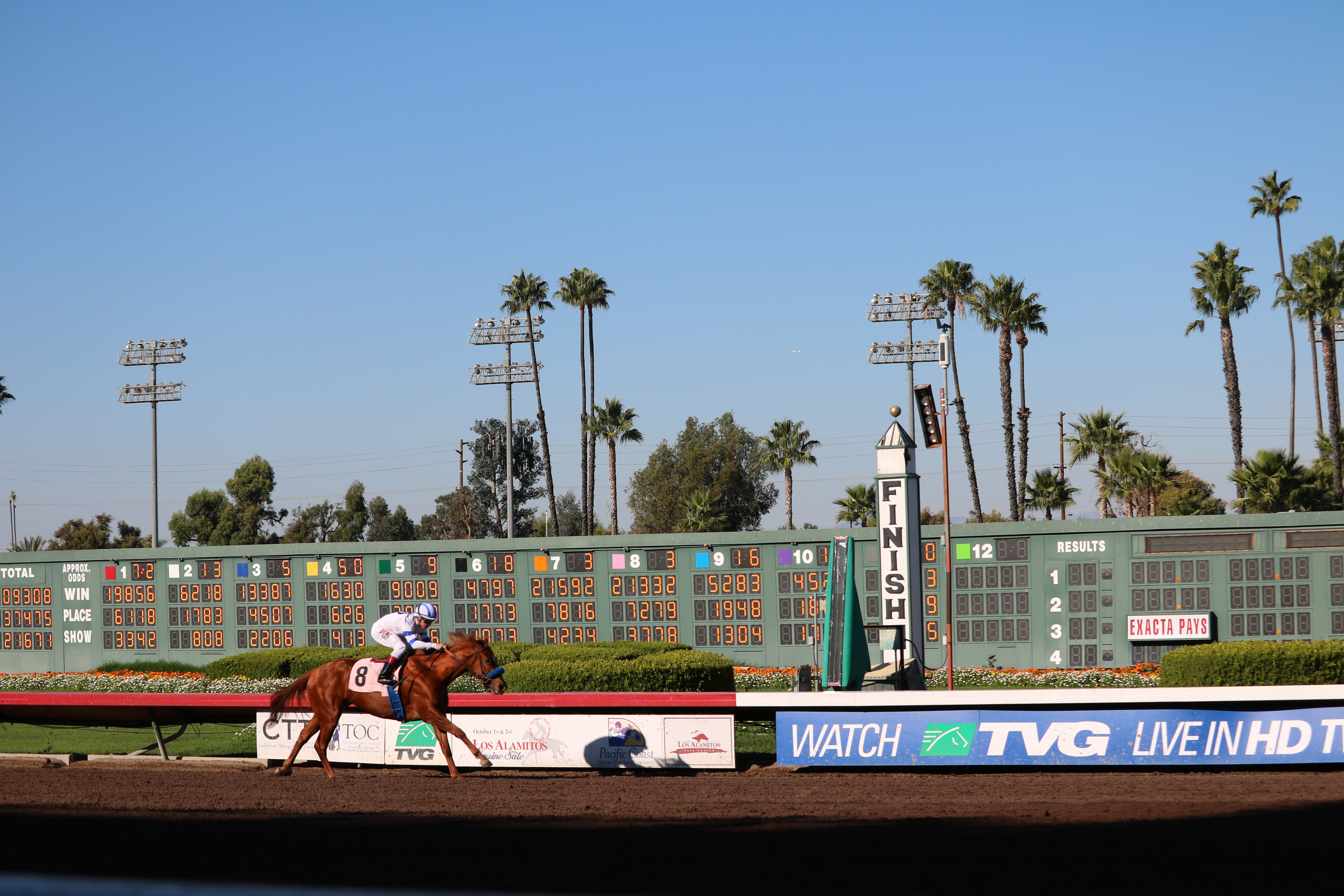
- Los Alamitos, 2016
- Location: City of Cypress, at 4961 Katella Avenue, (postal address) Los Alamitos, California
- Owned by: Ed Allred
- Date opened: 1951
- Race type: Thoroughbred, Quarter Horse
- Course type: Dirt
- Notable races: Champion of Champions; Los Alamitos $2 Million Futurity; Ed Burke Memorial Futurity; Kindergarten Futurity; Golden State Million Futurity; Mildred Vessels Memorial; Los Alamitos Super Derby; Los Alamitos Derby, Los Alamitos Futurity

Los Alamitos Race Course is a horse racing track in Cypress, California. The track hosts both thoroughbred and quarter horse racing. The track has the distinction of holding four quarter horse stakes races with purses over $1 million, more than any other track in the United States. Although the track is geographically located in the city of Cypress, it has a Los Alamitos postal address (ZIP Code 90720). Los Alamitos lies just across Katella Avenue to the south.

Michael Wrona is the track announcer.

== Early history ==
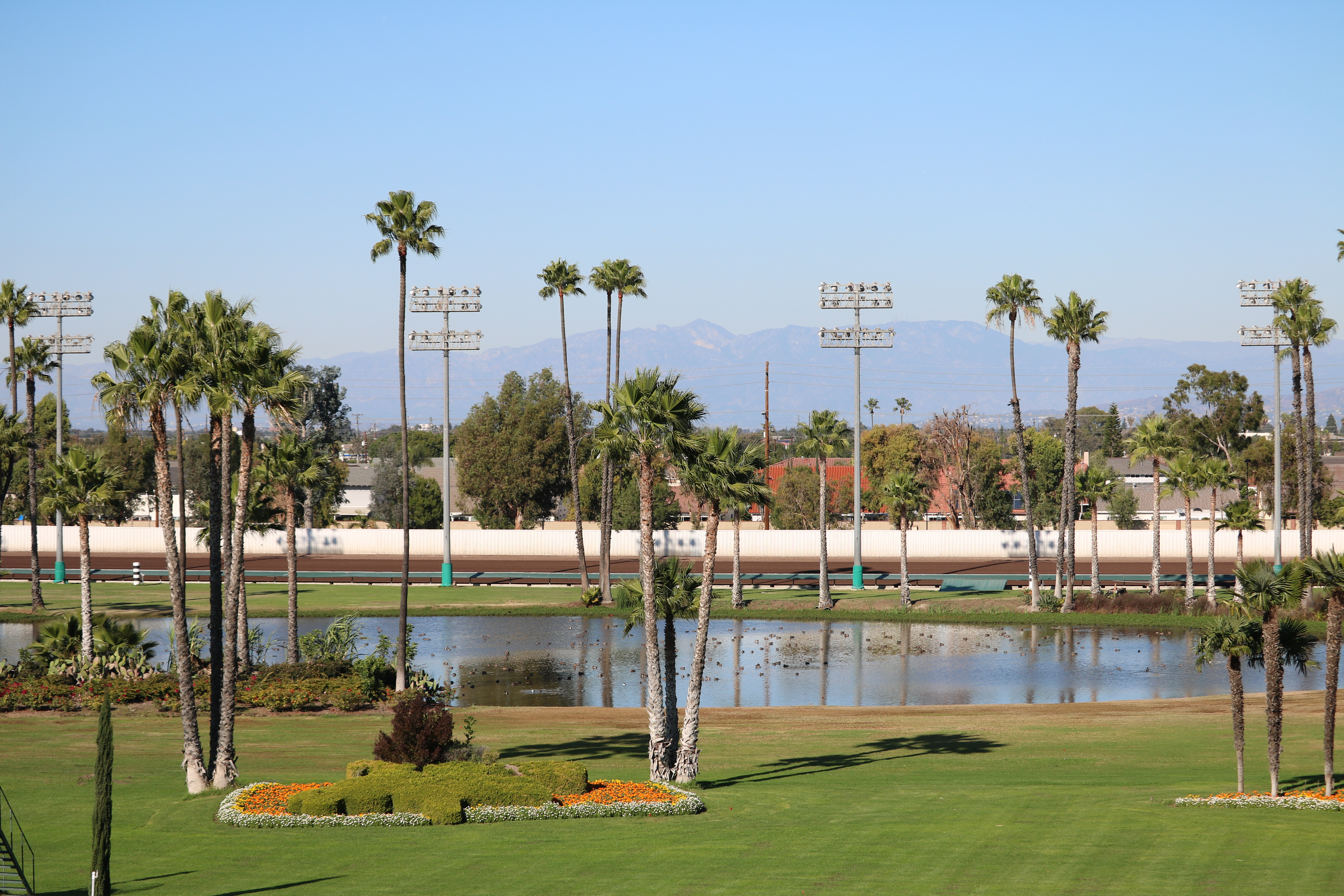
Track infield, 2016

Arriving from Kentucky with only $19 to his name, Frank Vessels Sr. built a fortune in the construction industry and eventually purchased a 435-acre (176 ha) ranch in Orange County. Racing at what is today Los Alamitos started off as match races contested on the Vessels Ranch in 1947.

The first parimutuel meet at Los Alamitos was held in 1951. The meet lasted 11 days, closing on 15 December. It rained for ten of the eleven days of the inaugural meet. Frank Vessels and his family spent many hours during this first meet repairing rain-induced damage to the racecourse. The closing night festivities featured a world-record performance by the mare Bart B S in the Miss Princess Handicap. She covered the 400 yd (365.8 m) in a time of :20.3.

Following the first meet, Mr. Vessels sank $100,000 of his personal funds into improvements at the track and lobbied the California Horse Racing Board for a total of 16 days of racing, which he was granted. The 1952 season saw financial success as business doubled over the initial meet. Los Alamitos hosted the $5,000 Clabbertown G. Stake at 350 yards.

== Go Man Go ==
The 1955 season saw the first true superstar of Los Alamitos. A coon-tailed, roan quarter horse with a distinctive look and noticeable personality, Go Man Go was so popular that huge crowds would pack the grandstands and chant his name as he notched victory after victory.

== Ed Allred ==
Dr. Ed Allred's first appearance as a law student at Los Alamitos was an unheralded event. He was only at the track because he had read that the Allred Brothers (who were no relations) were racing a horse at Los Alamitos. This one day started a lifelong love affair that would eventually see Dr. Allred as the sole owner of Los Alamitos.

Until the 1990s, the Vessels Family had always owned Los Alamitos. However, the 1980s proved a time of great change, as the track passed from one owner to another. Finally, when Los Alamitos was put up for sale in 1990, Allred, having made his fortune owning and operating the largest privately held chain of abortion clinics in the country, was able to acquire 50 per cent ownership, with help from R. D. Hubbard. 1995 saw the opening of the $5 million Vessels Club, the lavish turf club restaurant which has gained fame for the decor and food alike. The Vessels Club has even been named the top sports park restaurant in Southern California. In addition to the Vessels Club, the track has also opened such fan favorites as the Player's Club, Rodney's Bar (named after trainer Rodney Hart) and Schwanie's Grill (named for trainer Blane Schvaneveldt) under Dr. Allred's tenure.

1995 also saw the beginnings of the Los Alamitos $2 Million, a championship race for two-year-olds. The 2008 running was the richest non-Breeders' Cup race ever contested in California with a purse of $2,038,250. It is also the only quarter horse race in the country with a guaranteed $2,000,000 purse. Los Alamitos also offers the richest three-year-old quarter horse race in the country, the Los Alamitos Super Derby.

== Thoroughbreds ==
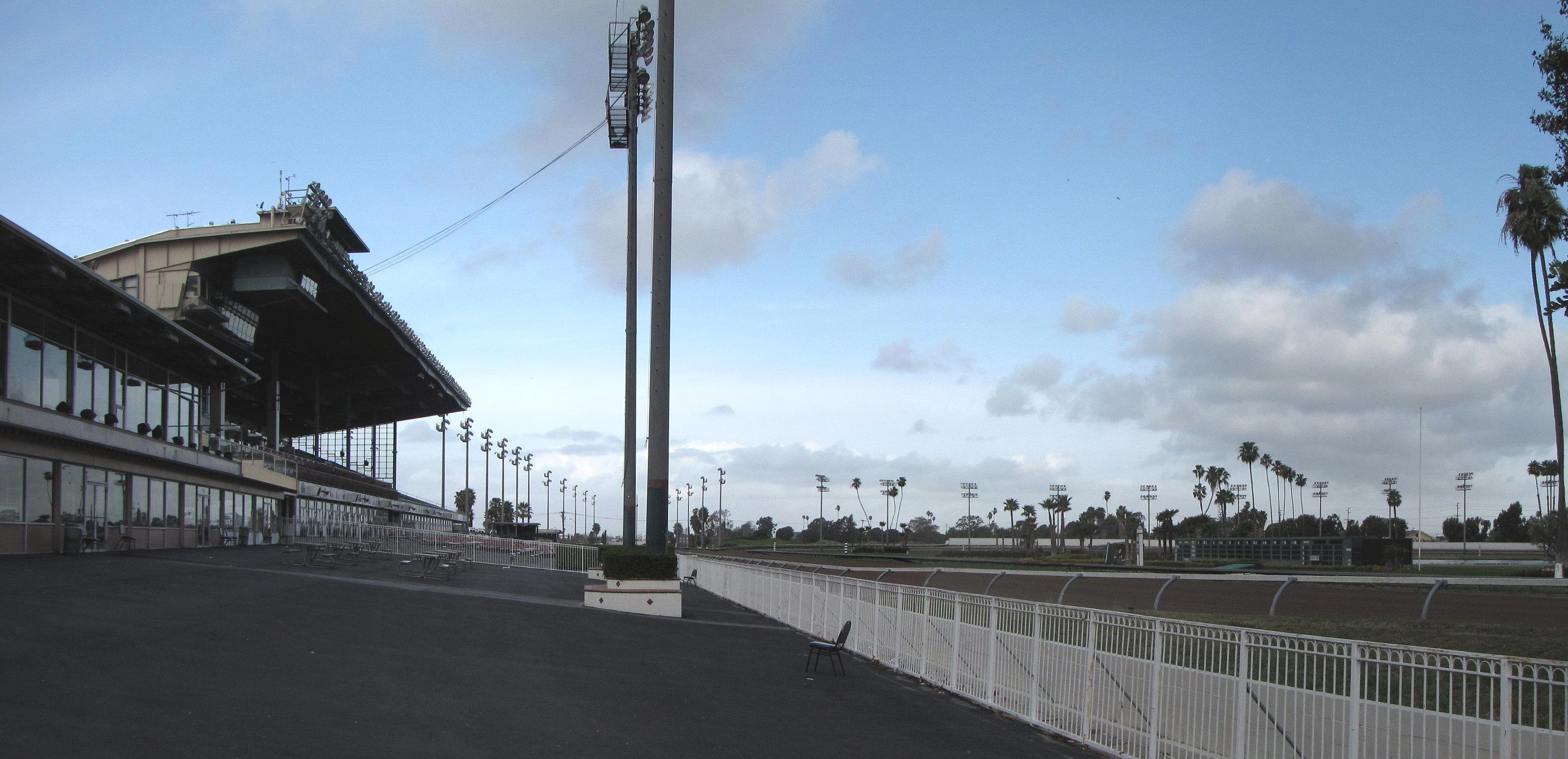
Grandstand

In 2014, with the 2013 closure of Hollywood Park, the Los Alamitos track was expanded to 1 mile (1.6 km) and hosted two Thoroughbreds-only meets. The track got considerable publicity when Art Sherman relocated his training stable's home base from Hollywood Park to Los Alamitos, and his trainee, the colt California Chrome won the 2014 Kentucky Derby and Preakness Stakes, developing a large fan base and was dubbed "America's Horse". Sherman Racing Stables' lodgings at Los Alamitos, away from the better-known Santa Anita Park, contributed to the horse's populist appeal. The Los Alamitos winter 2014 meet featured the relocated Grade I Starlet Stakes, won by Take Charge Brandi, giving trainer D. Wayne Lukas his eighth win in the Starlet, and also making him one of the few trainers to win at Los Alamitos with both Quarter Horses and Thoroughbreds.

=== Graded events ===
The following Graded Thoroughbred events were held at Los Alamitos in 2019.

Grade II

- Great Lady M. Stakes
- Los Alamitos Futurity
- Starlet Stakes

Grade III

- Bayakoa Stakes

The following graded Quarter Horse events were held at Los Alamitos in 2023.

Grade 1

- Brad McKenzie Winter Championship
- Champion of Champions
- Charger Bar Handicap
- Ed Burke Million Futurity
- Go Man Go Handicap
- Golden State Million Futurity
- Los Alamitos Super Derby
- Los Alamitos 2 Million Futurity
- Los Alamitos Winter Derby
- Mildred Vessels Memorial Handicap
- Robert Boniface Invitational Championship
- Vessels Maturity
- Spencer Childers Cal Breeders Championship

Grade 2

- El Primero De Año Derby
- Golden State Derby
- Las Damas Handicap
- Los Alamitos Championship Challenge
- Los Alamitos Oaks
- PCQHRA Breeders Derby
- PCQHRA Breeders Futurity
- Robert Adair Kindergarten Futurity
- Southern California Derby
- Governor's Cup Derby
- Governor's Cup Futurity

Grade 3

- First Down Dash Handicap
- Independence Day Handicap
- Kaweah Bar Handicap
- Miss Princess Handicap
- Cal Breeders Matron Oaks
- Denim N Diamonds Handicap
- Wild West Futurity
- Los Alamitos Distaff Challenge

== Quarter Horses ==
Notable Quarter Horses to have raced at Los Alamitos include Moonist, Sass Me Blue, and EC Jet One.
