= Jet Deck =

Quarter Horse racehorse and sire

- Breed: Quarter Horse
- Discipline: Racing
- Sire: Moon Deck
- Grandsire: Top Deck (TB)
- Dam: Miss Night Bar
- Maternal grandsire: Barred
- Sex: Stallion
- Foaled: 1960
- Died: August 26, 1971
- Country: United States
- Color: Bay
- Breeder: William and James Carter

Record
- 31 starts: 22-4-2; AAAT speed rating

Earnings
- $200,625.00

Major wins
- Los Alamitos Futurity; PCQHRA Futurity; Los Alamitos Championship; PCQHRA Derby

Awards
- 1963 World Champion Quarter Running Horse

Honors
- American Quarter Horse Hall of Fame

Jet Deck (1960–1971) was a Quarter Horse racehorse and sire.

== Life ==
Foaled April 19, 1960, in California, Jet Deck was the offspring of Moon Deck and a daughter of Barred named Miss Night Bar. Miss Night Bar was a granddaughter of Three Bars (TB).

== Racing career ==
Jet Deck was a multiple stakes winner and was named by the American Quarter Horse Association (or AQHA) the 1962 Champion Quarter Running Two Year Old Colt and Stallion, as well as the 1963 World Champion Quarter Running Horse. He raced for two years, with thirty-one starts. He won twenty-two of his starts, four times coming in second and placing third twice. He earned forty-two AQHA racing points to go with his money earnings of $200,625.00. His highest speed rating was AAAT.

== Breeding record and death ==
After Jet Deck's racing career, he was retired to stud duties, but died on August 26, 1971, from an injection of barbiturates into his bloodstream. The identity of the person who injected him has never been determined. Before his death, he sired 383 race Register of Merit earning horses, several world champion Quarter running horses, two AQHA High Point horses, and five AQHA Champions. Among his offspring are Easy Jet, Jet Smooth, Jet Threat, and Mr Jet West.

== Honors ==
Jet Deck was inducted into the AQHA Hall of Fame in 1991.

== Sire line tree ==
- Jet Deck
  - Jet Smooth
  - Easy Jet
    - Sunset Gallant Jet
    - Megahertz
    - My Easy Credit
    - Easy Move
    - Extra Easy
    - Pie In The Sky
    - Easily Smashed
    - Mr Trucka Jet
  - Jet Threat
  - Jet Charger
  - Tony B Deck
  - Jet Royale
  - Mr Jet West

== Pedigree ==
Equipoise (TB)
Equestrian (TB)
Frilette (TB)
Top Deck (TB)
Chicaro (TB)
River Boat (TB)
Last Boat (TB)
Moon Deck
*Under Fire (TB)
Peace Pipe (TB)
Loving Cup (TB)
Moonlight Night
The Dun Horse
Mae
La Bergeron
Jet Deck
Percentage (TB)
Three Bars (TB)
Myrtle Dee (TB)
Barred
Red Joe Of Arizona
Ready
Ruby by Red Cloud
Miss Night Bar
Midnight
Midnight Jr
Salty
Belle of Midnight
Pankey's Lucky
Myrna Loy
Pankey mare
