= Blue Ribbon Downs =

Defunct horse racing track in Oklahoma, US

Coordinates: 35.4593°N 94.8446°W

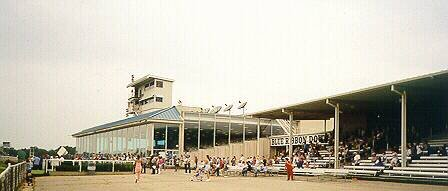
- Location: Sallisaw, Oklahoma, United States
- Owned by: Cherokee Nation
- Date opened: 1963 (62 years ago)
- Date closed: 2009
- Race type: Thoroughbred; Quarter horse
- Course type: Flat

Blue Ribbon Downs was an American horse racing track located in Sallisaw, Sequoyah County, Oklahoma. The facility hosted American Quarter Horse, and Thoroughbred flat racing events until it closed permanently in 2009.

== History ==
Blue Ribbon Downs started when Bill Hedge bought 102 acres just west of Sallisaw in 1960. The track soon became known as a proving ground and gained recognition from the American Quarter Horse Association in 1963. Hedge sold the track to an investment group in 1973.it permanently closed in 2009.and the grandstands we're demolished in 2022. only the track and barns remain as a training facility.

== Parimutuel wagering ==
In 1982, Oklahoma voters approved pari-mutuel betting and the first pari-mutuel race at Blue Ribbon Downs occurred August 30, 1984, before twelve thousand spectators in a sweltering temperature above 100 degrees. The advent of legal gambling at the track caused a local construction boom with motels, restaurants, and other businesses locating near the track.

== Bankruptcy ==
Over time, the popularity of gambling on horse racing waned and the track struggled financially with several owners, filing bankruptcy in 1997 and again in 2002. In 2003 the Cherokee Nation bought Blue Ribbon Downs and infused it with capital. In 2005 the new owners converted it to a "racino," a combination horse racetrack and casino. The track continued to struggle, and closed permanently after their races on November 28, 2009.
