= Top Deck (horse) =

20th-century American Thoroughbred sire

- Sire: Equestrian
- Grandsire: Equipoise
- Dam: River Boat
- Damsire: Chicaro
- Sex: Stallion
- Foaled: 1945
- Country: United States
- Colour: Brown
- Breeder: King Ranch
- Owner: J. B. Ferguson
- Record: unraced
- Earnings: unraced

Major wins
- unraced

Awards
- unraced

Honours
- American Quarter Horse Hall of Fame

Unraced as a Thoroughbred, the stallion Top Deck (1945–1965) went on to become a famous sire of Quarter Horses.

== Life ==
Top Deck was foaled in 1945 and was injured as a young foal, preventing a racing career. His sire was a grandson of Man o' War named Equestrian. His dam was a daughter of Chicaro, a horse known for speed at the short distances.

== Breeding record ==
He was the sire of Go Man Go, Rebel Cause, Top Ladybug, Mighty Deck, Decketta, War Machine and Moon Deck. Two of his sons were inducted into the American Quarter Horse Hall of Fame – Go Man Go and Moon Deck. He sired 440 Quarter Horse foals, with four AQHA Champions, 219 Race Registers of Merit, twelve Performance Registers of Merit and twenty-one Superior Race Horse awards. Two of his offspring earned the AQHA Supreme Champion award – Astro Deck and War Machine. Top Deck was 20 years old when he died in 1965.

== Death and Honors ==
Top Deck died in 1965 in Purcell, Oklahoma.

Top Deck was inducted into the American Quarter Horse Hall of Fame in 1990.

== Sire line tree ==
- Top Deck
  - Moon Deck
    - Caprideck
    - Cue Deck
    - Jet Deck
      - Jet Smooth
      - Easy Jet
        - Sunset Gallant Jet
        - Megahertz
        - My Easy Credit
        - Easy Move
        - Extra Easy
        - Pie In The Sky
        - Easily Smashed
        - Mr Trucka Jet
      - Jet Threat
      - Jet Charger
      - Tony B Deck
      - Jet Royale
      - Mr Jet West
    - Top Moon
      - Moon Lark
    - Jet Too
  - Ridge Butler
  - Go Man Go
    - Mr Meyers
      - Go Leo Go
    - Hustling Man
    - Duplicate Copy
    - Story Man
  - Rebel Cause
  - Play Deck
  - Mighty Deck
  - War Machine

== Pedigree ==
Peter Pan I
Pennant
*Royal Rose
Equipoise
Broomstick
Swinging
*Balancoire II
Equestrian
Fair Play
Man o' War
Mahubah
Frilette
Broomstick
*Frillery
Petticoat
Top Deck
=Spearmint
*Chicle
=Lady Hamburg II
Chicaro
Peter Pan I
Wendy
Remembrance
River Boat
*Teddy
*Sir Gallahad 3rd
=Plucky Liege
Last Boat
Man o' War
Taps
Shady
