= All American Futurity =

Race for two-year-old Quarter Horses in New Mexico, US

- Class: All American Futurity
- Location: New Mexico State Fair in Albuquerque, New Mexico
- Inaugurated: Labor Day, 1959

The All American Futurity is a race for two-year-old American Quarter Horse racehorses traditionally run on Labor Day. It is the last leg of the AQHA Triple Crown that has only been won once, by Special Effort in 1981. A $4 million bonus was once offered to the horse that could sweep all three Triple Crown races. It started in 1959, with a purse of $129,686.85. It has always billed itself as the richest race in American Quarter Horse racing; in 1978, the purse was over a million dollars and in 1982, the winner's portion of the purse totaled over a million dollars for the first time. The 1980 edition was carried live in prime-time on CBS. The 2024 version of the race had a purse of $3 million and a winner's share of $1.5 million, making it one of the richest races in North America.

Ruidoso Downs Race Track in Ruidoso Downs, New Mexico held the All American Futurity through 2023. The race was moved to the New Mexico State Fair at The Downs at Albuquerque in 2024 due to flood damage at Ruidoso Downs, and was moved again in 2025 due to additional flood damage. The Downs at Albuquerque will host the race for a third time in 2026. Prior to the 2026 race, it was announced by Ruidoso Downs officials that the All American Futurity and its supporting races would be moved to Lone Star Park in Grand Prairie, Texas for the foreseeable future starting in 2027.

The track record was set at this race in 2006, when No Secrets Here finished in 20.886 seconds for 440 yards, for an average speed of 43.091 miles/hr.

== Winners by year ==
Year	Horse
1959	Galobar
1960	Tonto Bars Hank
1961	Pokey Bar
1962	Hustling Man
1963	Goetta
1964	Decketta
1965	Savannah Jr
1966	Go Dick Go
1967	Laico Bird
1968	Three Oh's
1969	Easy Jet
1970	Rocket Wrangler
1971	Mr Kid Charge
1972	Possumjet
1973	Timeto Thinkrich
1974	Easy Date
1975	Bugs Alive In 75
1976	Real Wind
1977	Hot Idea
1978	Moon Lark
1979	Pie In The Sky
1980	Higheasterjet
1981	Special Effort
1982	Mr Master Bug
1983	On A High
1984	Eastex
1985	Mr Trucka Jet
1986	Ronas Ryon
1987	Elans Special
1988	Merganser
1989	Strawberry Silk
1990	Refrigerator
1991	Royal Quick Dash
1992	Dash Thru Traffic
1993	A Classic Dash
1994	Noblesse Six
1995	Winalota Cash
1996	Streakin Flyer
1997	Corona Cash
1998	Falling In Loveagain
1999	A Delightful Dasher
2000	Eyesa Special
2001	Ausual Suspect
2002	AB What A Runner
2003	By By JJ
2004	DM Shicago
2005	Teller Cartel
2006	No Secrets Here
2007	HeartsWideOpen
2008	Stolis Winner
2009	Running Brook Gal
2010	Mr Piloto
2011	Ochoa
2012	One Dashing Eagle
2013	Handsome Jack Flash
2014	JM Miracle
2015	Jess Good Candy
2016	Imperial Eagle
2017	Fly Baby Fly
2018	Apocalyptical Jess
2019	Mr. Jess Jenkins
2020	Whistle Stop Cafe
2021	KJ Desperado
2022	Hes Judgeandjury
2023	Cowboys Gun Z
2024	Hezgothelook Z
2025	King of the Tide
