= Purchase (horse) =

American-bred Thoroughbred racehorse

- Sire: Ormondale
- Grandsire: Ormonde
- Dam: Cherryola
- Damsire: Tanzmeister
- Sex: Stallion
- Foaled: 1916
- Country: USA
- Colour: Chestnut
- Breeder: W. B. Miller
- Owner: Sam Hildreth
- Trainer: Sam Hildreth
- Record: 23 Starts: 14 wins
- Earnings: $39,706

Major wins
- Jockey Club Gold Cup (1919); Southampton Handicap (1919); Stuyvesant Handicap (1919); Brooklyn Derby (1919); Empire City Derby (1919); Huron Handicap (1919); Saratoga Handicap (1919); Saranac Handicap (1919)
- Last updated on September 14, 2008

Purchase (foaled in 1916, died 1936), an American Thoroughbred racehorse, was called "The Adonis of the Turf." Walter Vosburgh, the official handicapper for The Jockey Club as well as a turf historian for many years (and for whom the Vosburgh Stakes were named), wrote: "…one of the most exquisitely beautiful of racehorses…to describe Purchase would be to exhaust the superlative."

== Background ==
Purchase was the best son of Ormandale, the only foal in the 1903 crop of Ormonde. Racing, Ormonde went undefeated, an English Triple Crown winner, but as an imported sire he was almost infertile. As for his son, Ormandale (born in Menlo Park, California), he was not the runner his father was, but as a sire, he was much the better horse. Sent to Kentucky in 1912 at the death of his California breeder, he entered the second half of his stud career as an immediate success. The dam of Purchase was Cherryola whose racing career was more than respectable, winning 26 races between the years 1909 to 1913. (On April 15, 1923, along with forty other horses, she died in a barn fire at Harry F. Sinclair's Rancocas Stable, New Jersey.)

Eventually standing 16 hands 1 inch, Purchase was a long-legged golden chestnut, sold as a yearling to the Brighton Stable which was shortly thereafter dispersed. The trainer Sam Hildreth bought Purchase for $12,500. By the end of his racing career, Hildreth said that Purchase was one of the greatest racehorses he ever trained…"and I say that without any strings to it."

== Racing career ==
Racing at two, he went winless in at least seven races, including the Futurity Stakes (coming in third) basically due to what Hildreth described as a "bad break." But Sam Hildreth thought all that would change with maturity, especially as the colt had injured his leg just before another two-year-old race. And Hildreth was right. Racing at the age of three, Purchase was barely beaten out of winning the three-year-old colt division by Sir Barton even though Purchase had won nine races of 11 that year, including the inaugural running of the Jockey Club Gold Cup. Hildreth would have entered Purchase in the 1919 Kentucky Derby as well as the Preakness Stakes, but just before the Derby, Purchase reared up in his stall and caught a front hoof in a hay rack. This delayed his third year campaign until he beat the first Triple Crown winner Sir Barton by three lengths in the Dwyer Stakes on July 10, 1919.

In the Saratoga Handicap, Purchase bested Eternal who was co-favorite for Sir Barton's Kentucky Derby and had been American Champion Two-Year-Old Colt as well as America's top earner in 1918. Purchase came in second to Eternal in the Brooklyn Handicap and second to Exterminator in the Saratoga Cup. (Exterminator won the Saratoga Cup four years in row: 1919 through 1922 as well as the 1918 Kentucky Derby.) Purchase took the Saranac Stakes carrying 133 pounds and the Huron Stakes carrying 134. In the two races he lost, he came in a good second, and in the race against Exterminator, it was his jockey, claimed Hildreth, who rode Purchase badly, as well as losing his whip. Otherwise, Sam Hildreth was sure he would have won.

Sometime during this streak, Hildreth was offered $100,000 for the colt (or, depending on the source, $300,000), but turned it down.

At the end of his three-year-old season, Hildreth, feeling he had nothing else to beat (and the connections of Man o' War only racing their horse against three-year-olds; by then Purchase was four), still kept Purchase in training. Breezing at Laurel Park, the horse struck a rock on the track, tearing the ligaments loose in his off front leg. He did not race again until he was five years old. In this last season he ran under the colors of Harry Sinclair. Beginning in July 1921, he appeared at the Empire City track in a sprint race, causing a sensation among racing fans. He won that race and the one after, but on his way to Saratoga Springs, New York, to continue that year's campaign, once again ill luck struck. On the train he wrenched one of his hind legs, ending his racing career

== Stud record ==
Produce was retired to stud at Rancocas Stable and stood in the largest box stall next to Zev, Grey Lag and Lucullite.

When Rancocas Stable was itself dispersed in 1930, Purchase was 14 years old. He sold for only $2,000. At stud he had been a disappointment, but like other horses trained by Hildreth it was probably due to Fowler's solution, a concoction Hildreth gave all his horses which contained arsenic and strychnine. Even so, he did get a few winners. His daughter Orissa won the Fashion Stakes and the Clover Stakes. Sabine, Semba, Miss Purray, and a number of others won lesser races.

Purchase died at William Elder's Merryland Farm in Maryland in 1936.

== Pedigree ==
Pedigree of Purchase, chestnut colt, 1916
Sire Ormondale	Ormonde	Bend Or	Doncaster
Sire Ormondale	Ormonde	Bend Or	Rouge Rose
Sire Ormondale	Ormonde	Lily Agnes	Macaroni
Sire Ormondale	Ormonde	Lily Agnes	Polly Agnes
Sire Ormondale	Santa Bella	St. Serf	St. Simon
Sire Ormondale	Santa Bella	St. Serf	Feronia
Sire Ormondale	Santa Bella	Maiden Belle	Beau Brummel
Sire Ormondale	Santa Bella	Maiden Belle	Maidenhair
Dam Cherryola	Tanzmeister	Saraband	Muncaster
Dam Cherryola	Tanzmeister	Saraband	Highland Fling
Dam Cherryola	Tanzmeister	Mizpah	Macgregor
Dam Cherryola	Tanzmeister	Mizpah	Underhand Mare
Dam Cherryola	Last Cherry	Sir Dixon	Billet
Dam Cherryola	Last Cherry	Sir Dixon	Jaconet
Dam Cherryola	Last Cherry	Cherry Blossom	Powhattan
Dam Cherryola	Last Cherry	Cherry Blossom	Atalanta (family: 37)
