= Continental Handicap =

- Class: Defunct stakes race
- Location: Jamaica Race Course, Jamaica, New York; United States
- Inaugurated: 1903
- Race type: Thoroughbred - Flat racing

Race information
- Distance: 1 1/16 miles: 1903, 1926-1945; 1 1/8 miles: 1918-1925, 1947
- Surface: Dirt
- Track: left-handed
- Qualification: Three-year-olds and up
- Purse: $15,000 added

The Continental Handicap was an American thoroughbred horse race hosted by Jamaica Race Course in Jamaica, Queens. The event was first run in 1903, the year in which the Jamaica track opened. A race on dirt for horses of all ages over a distance of a mile and a sixteenth, it was not run again until 1918 when the distance was increased to a mile and an eighth with two-year-old horses no longer eligible to compete.

The inaugural running of November 14, 1903 was won by Hurstbourne on a muddy track under jockey Arthur Redfern. After being run twenty-nine times at the Jamaica track, the October 27, 1947 edition would be the last for the Continental Handicap.

== Historical notes ==
While the Continental Handicap would frequently draw small fields, it nevertheless regularly attracted top quality entries from some of the major racing stables in the country. The October 12, 1918 reinstatement edition of the race provided an upset when A. Kingsley Macomber's Star Master defeated both the future Hall of Fame inductee Roamer and the heavily favored 1916 Kentucky Derby winner George Smith. Star Master set a new track record for a mile and an eighth with a winning time of 1:51 3/5. The following year, Star Master made a successful return to ultimately become the only horse in the twenty-nine-year history of the race to win the Continental Handicap more than once.

Future Hall of Fame jockey Laverne Fator won the 1923 running of the Continental Handicap aboard Little Chief. It would be Fator's first of four wins which would prove to be the most for any jockey. With Laverne Fator aboard the next year, Mad Play became the second Continental Handicap winner to break the Jamaica track record for the mile and an eighth distance when he won the 1924 race in the then very fast time of 1:49.60.

The four-year-old racemare Black Maria came into the 1927 Continental Handicap as the American Champion Three-Year-Old Filly. After five scheduled starters were scratched, she was left to defeat only the Sage Stable's colt Rip Rap. Black Maria's continued success saw her go on to be recognized as the American Champion Older Dirt Female Horse for that year and again in 1928.

The 1928 running was won by the previous year's American Horse of the Year, Chance Play. Retired to stud after his productive 1928 campaign, Chance Play would twice earn Leading sire in North America status.

The 1935 Continental Handicap was described by the September 29 edition of the New York Times as "the greatest race of King Saxon's career."

After finishing second to King Saxon in the 1935 Continental Handicap, Count Arthur won the 1936 edition for owner Fannie Hertz. Count Arthur would win multiple stakes races during his career including top-level events such as the Manhattan Handicap (1935), Jockey Club Gold Cup (1936), Merchants and Citizens Handicap (1937), and twice the Saratoga Cup (1935, 1937).

As a result of the 1999 book Seabiscuit: An American Legend by Laura Hillenbrand, and the ensuing motion picture in 2003, today the victor by five lengths over eleven other runners in the 1937 Continental is the best known winner of this race.

Riverland, a gelding owned by Howard A. Clark's Louisiana Farm, crossed the finish line first by a nose in the 1942 race. Jockey Darrell Clingman aboard second-place finisher Boysy filed a complaint that he had been interfered with by Wayne Wright, the jockey aboard Riverland. A Patrol Judge had noted the incident and confirmed Clingman's claim that jockey Wright had grabbed his leg and saddle cloth as the two raced side-by-side down the homestretch. Riverland was disqualified and Boysy declared the winner with track officials immediately suspending jockey Wright and referring the matter to the Jockey Club.

The Continental Handicap of 1945 went to Stymie who won by six lengths in a time of 1:43 2/5 that equaled the stakes record for a mile and a sixteenth. Stymie went on to win 1945 American Champion Handicap Horse honors. On June 2, 1943, Stymie had been claimed by trainer Hirsch Jacobs for $1,500 for his wife Ethel to race. Stymie would retire as America's all-time leading money earner with $918,485 and, following its creation, would be inducted into the U.S. Racing Hall of Fame.

== Records ==
Speed record:

- 1:49.60 @ 1 1/8 miles : Mad Play (1924)
- 1:43.40 @ 1 1/16 miles : Some Chance (1944), Stymie (1945)

Most wins:

- 2 - Star Master (1918, 1919)

Most wins by a jockey:

- 4 - Laverne Fator (1923, 1924, 1926, 1927)

Most wins by a trainer:

- 4 - Sam Hildreth (1920, 1921 1923, 1924)

Most wins by an owner:

- 3 - Belair Stud (1925, 1932, 1934)

== Winners ==
Year	Winner	Age	Jockey	Trainer	Owner	Dist. (Miles)	Time	Win $
1947	Our Tommy	3	Conn McCreary	Hirsch Jacobs	Isadore Bieber	11/8 m	1:52.60	$3,280
1946	Race not held							
1945	Stymie	4	Robert Permane	Hirsch Jacobs	Ethel D. Jacobs	11/16 m	1:43.40	$11,425
1944	Some Chance	5	Albert Snider	B. Frank Christmas	Abram Stevens Hewitt II	11/16 m	1:43.40	$8,175
1943	First Fiddle	4	Warren Mehrtens	Edward Mulrenan	Jean W. Mulrenan	11/16 m	1:45.40	$8,075
1942	Boysy	6	Darrell Clingman	Tommy Heard	Tommy Heard	11/16 m	1:44.60	$8,475
1941	Dit	4	Carroll Bierman	Max Hirsch	W. Arnold Hanger	11/16 m	1:45.80	$8,650
1940	Can't Wait	5	Alfred M. Robertson	J. Thomas Taylor	Myron Selznick	11/16 m	1:44.20	$9,250
1939	Kayak II	4	John Adams	Tom Smith	Charles S. Howard	11/16 m	1:45.00	$8,800
1938	Roguish Girl	5	Warren Yarberry	Julius Wessler	Benjamin Deutch	11/16 m	1:45.00	$8,750
1937	Seabiscuit	4	Red Pollard	Tom Smith	Charles S. Howard	11/16 m	1:44.80	$9,250
1936	Count Arthur	4	Sam Renick	Lon Johnson	Fannie Hertz	11/16 m	1:44.60	$4,910
1935	King Saxon	4	Raymond Workman	Charles H. "Pat" Knebelkamp	Charles H. "Pat" Knebelkamp	11/16 m	1:43.60	$3,740
1934	Fleam	3	James Stout	James E. Fitzsimmons	Belair Stud	11/16 m	1:45.60	$2,740
1933	Sweeping Light	4	Frank Catrone	Fred E. Kraft	Arthur Kram	11/16 m	1:44.00	$1,330
1932	Pardee	3	Thomas Malley	James E. Fitzsimmons	Belair Stud	11/16 m	1:45.60	$1,700
1931	Halcyon	3	Alfred M. Robertson	Thomas J. Healey	C. V. Whitney	11/16 m	1:45.00	$3,120
1930	Starpatic	3	Frank Catrone	William H. Karrick	Sanford Stud Farm	11/16 m	1:47.80	$4,900
1929	Light Carbine	6	Charles Kurtsinger	Michael J. Dunleavy	Ira B. Humphreys	11/16 m	1:46.00	$5,100
1928	Chance Play	5	Linus McAtee	George M. Odom	Log Cabin Stable	11/16 m	1:46.20	$5,400
1927	Black Maria	5	Laverne Fator	William H. Karrick	William R. Coe	11/16 m	1:45.20	$5,650
1926	Catalan	5	Laverne Fator	John J. Hastings	Bedford Farms Stable	11/16 m	1:44.00	$5,500
1925	Aga Khan	4	Fred J. Stevens	James E. Fitzsimmons	Belair Stud	1-1/8 m	1:52.80	$5,050
1924	Mad Play	3	Laverne Fator	Sam Hildreth	Rancocas Stable	1-1/8 m	1:49.60	$5,900
1923	Little Chief	4	Laverne Fator	Sam Hildreth	Colorado Stable (Ira B. Humphreys)	1-1/8 m	1:53.00	$4,850
1922	Brainstorm	3	Edward Bell	Joseph E. Edwards	Mirasol Stable (Henry Waterson)	1-1/8 m	1:51.00	$4,750
1921	Thunderclap	5	Earl Sande	Sam Hildreth	Rancocas Stable	1-1/8 m	1:52.00	$3,300
1920	Cirrus	4	Lavelle Ensor	Sam Hildreth	Sam Hildreth	1-1/8 m	1:51.60	$3,275
1919	Star Master	5	Merritt Buxton	Walter B. Jennings	A. Kingsley Macomber	1-1/8 m	1:53.40	$2,175
1918	Star Master	4	Edward Taplin	Walter B. Jennings	A. Kingsley Macomber	1-1/8 m	1:51.60	$2,225
1904	1917	Race not held						
1903	Hurstbourne	3	Arthur Redfern	Thomas Welsh	William B. Leeds	11/16 m	1:49.00	$1,995
