= Southampton Handicap =

- Location: Jamaica Race Course, Jamaica, New York, United States
- Inaugurated: 1904
- Race type: Thoroughbred - Flat racing

Race information
- Distance: 1 1/16 miles
- Surface: Dirt
- Track: left-handed
- Qualification: Three-year-olds

The Southampton Handicap was a Thoroughbred horse race first run on October 19, 1904 at Jamaica Race Course in Jamaica, New York. A race for three-year-old horses it was contested on dirt over a distance of a mile and a sixteenth through to its last edition on May 10, 1932. There was no race held in 1908, 1910-1912, and 1914 due to the effects of the 1908 passage of the Hart-Agnew anti-betting legislation by the New York Legislature.

For 1913 only, the Southampton Handicap was hosted by Belmont Park.

== Records ==
Speed record: 1:44.00 – Samaritan 1924 ; Bright Steel 1925 (both on a track rated fast)

Most wins by a jockey:

- 2 – Lawrence Lyke (1918, 1919)
- 2 – John D. Mooney (1921, 1923)

Most wins by a trainer:

- 3 - James E. Fitzsimmons (1921, 1922, 1923)
- 3 – Bennett W. Creech (1929, 1930, 1932)

Most wins by an owner:

- 3 – Quincy Stable (James Francis Johnson) (1921, 1922, 1923)

== Winners ==
Year	Winner	Jockey	Trainer	Owner	Dist. (Miles)	Time	Win $
1932	Pompeius	Lavelle Ensor	Bennett W. Creech	Bennett W. Creech	11/16 M	1:46.80	$3,925
1931	Clock Tower	Pete Walls	Max Hirsch	Morton L. Schwartz	11/16 M	1:45.00	$4,100
1930	Cesare	Alfred Schenk	Bennett W. Creech	William R. Coe	11/16 M	1:46.40	$4,050
1929	Begorra	Donald Lyons	Bennett W. Creech	William R. Coe	11/16 M	1:44.60	$4,200
1928	Mowlee	Laverne Fator	Sam Hildreth	Rancocas Stable	11/16 M	1:45.40	$4,850
1927	Premier	Linus McAtee	George M. Odom	Aknusti Stable	11/16 M	1:45.60	$5,650
1926	Navigator	George Ellis	Clyde S. Phillips	Greentree Stable	11/16 M	1:45.00	$5,850
1925	Bright Steel	Frank Coltiletti	John Johnson	James Butler	11/16 M	1:44.00	$5,600
1924	Samaritan	John Maiben	Hollie Hughes	Sanford Stud Farms	11/16 M	1:44.00	$5,900
1923	Carol	John D. Mooney	James E. Fitzsimmons	Quincy Stable (James Francis Johnson)	11/16 M	1:48.20	$6,350
1922	Relay	Clyde Ponce	James E. Fitzsimmons	Quincy Stable (James Francis Johnson)	11/16 M	1:44.80	$6,200
1921	Knobbie	John D. Mooney	James E. Fitzsimmons	Quincy Stable (James Francis Johnson)	11/16 M	1:45.00	$5,650
1920	Gladiator	Newton Barrett	William J. Booth	Redstone Stable	11/16 M	1:47.40	$3,625
1919	Purchase	Lawrence Lyke	Sam Hildreth	Sam Hildreth	11/16 M	1:46.60	$3,850
1918	Jack Hare Jr.	Lawrence Lyke	Frank D. Weir	William E. Applegate	11/16 M	1:47.20	$2,825
1917	Hourless	James Butwell	Sam Hildreth	August Belmont Jr.	11/16 M	1:45.60	$3,625
1916	Spur	Johnny Loftus	John H. McCormack	James Butler	11/16 M	1:48.00	$2,075
1915	The Finn	George Byrne	Edward W. Heffner	Harry C. Hallenbeck	11/16 M	146.40	$2,325
1914	Race not held						
1913	Strenuous	Kenneth Karrick	William H. Karrick	Oneck Stable	11/16 M	1:47.00	$1,580
1910	1912	Race not held					
1909	May River	A. Nicolai	Thomas J. Healey	Montpelier Stable	11/16 M	1:48.20	$1,050
1908	Race not held						
1907	Faust	Guy Burns	Frank E. Brown	Frank E. Brown	11/16 M	1:47.00	$1,530
1906	Hot Toddy	Walter Miller	Kimball Patterson	W. Hopson Laudeman	11/16 M	1:48.20	$1,505
1905	Gamara	W. G. Perrine	Roger Minton	Morris L. Hayman	11/16 M	1:47.20	$1,690
1904	Dolly Spanker	Arthur Redfern	Thomas J. Healey	Richard T. Wilson Jr.	11/16 M	1:46.80	$1,475
