= Queens County Handicap =

- Class: Ungraded
- Location: Aqueduct Racetrack; Queens, New York, United States
- Inaugurated: 1902
- Race type: Thoroughbred – Flat racing
- Website: www.nyra.com/aqueduct/Stakes/QueensCounty.shtml

Race information
- Distance: 1 3/8 miles (9 furlongs)
- Surface: Dirt
- Track: left-handed
- Qualification: Three-years-old & up
- Weight: Assigned
- Purse: US$125,000 (2016)

The Queens County Handicap is an American Ungraded Thoroughbred horse race run annually during the second week of December at Aqueduct Racetrack in Queens, New York. Open to horses age three years and older, it is contested on dirt at a distance of one and three-sixteenths miles (9.5 furlongs).

Inaugurated in 1902, the Queens County Handicap is one of America's oldest races still running. It was hosted by Belmont Park in 1946 and at the old Jamaica Racetrack in Jamaica, Queens, New York from 1956 to 1958. Since inception it has been contested at various distances:

- 1 mile, 70 yards : 1902–1903
- 1 mile : 1904–1939, 1959–1963
- 1 1/16 miles : 1940–1958, 1993
- 1 1/8 miles: 1964–1971, 2012 – present
- 1 3/16 miles : 1972–1992, 1994–2011

The Queens County is, like many races at Aqueduct, named for a New York City borough. Queens is the borough that includes the Aqueduct race track. It is also the largest of New York City's five boroughs.

There was no race run in 1909, and from 1911 through 1913. The race, once a graded stakes, has lost that status.

== Historical notes ==
In winning the 1916 Queens County Handicap, Short Grass set a new United States record of 1:36 2/5 for one mile over a dirt course with a turn.

In 2001, three-year-old Evening Attire won the race. Six years later he came back to win it again at age nine, making him the oldest horse to ever win the Queens County Handicap.

== Records ==
Speed record: (at distance of 1 3/16 miles)

- 1:54.40 – Sunny And Mild (1972)

Most wins:

- 2 – Roamer (1915, 1918)
- 2 – Halcyon (1931, 1932)
- 2 – Three Rings (1949, 1950)
- 2 – Evening Attire (2001, 2007)

Most wins by a jockey:

- 5 – Eddie Maple (1977, 1979, 1985, 1986, 1991)

Most wins by a trainer:

- 5 – Sam Hildreth (1920, 1922, 1923, 1924, 1925)
- 5 – Lou Rondinello (1973, 1975, 1978, 1980, 1983)

Most wins by an owner:

- 4 – Rancocas Stable (1922, 1923, 1924, 1925)

== Winners ==
Year	Winner	Age	Jockey	Trainer	Owner	Dist. (Miles)	Time	Gr.
2023	Law Professor	5	Manuel Franco	Rob Atras	Twin Creeks Racing Stables	1-1/8	1:51.00	
2022	No Race							
2021	Forewarned	6	Dexter Haddock	Uriah St.Lewis	Uriah St.Lewis	1-1/8	1:51.90	
2020	Backsideofthemoon	8	Jose Lezcano	Rudy R. Rodriguez	Repole Stable	1-1/8	1:50.72	
2019	Stan The Man	5	Dylan Davis	John P. Terranova II	Long Lake Stable LLC	1-1/8	1:50.72	
2018	Name Changer	5	David Cohen	Alan E. Goldberg	Colts Neck Stables LLC	1-1/8	1:53.87	
2017	Zanotti	4	Jorge A. Vargas Jr.	Juan Carlos Guerrero	Ten Strike Racing	1-1/8	1:51.64	
2016	War Story	4	Antonio A. Gallardo	Mario Serey Jr.	Loooch Racing Stables & Imaginary Stables et al.	1-1/8	1:52.56	
2015	Financial Modeling	4	Irad Ortiz Jr.	Chad C. Brown	Klaravich Stables/William Lawrence	1-1/8	1:49.60	
2014	Micromanage	4	Manuel Franco	Todd Pletcher	Repole Stable	1-1/8	1:51.76	
2013	Jonesy Boy	4	Rajiv Maragh	Kelly Breen	George & Lori Hall	1-1/8	1:52.02	
2012	San Pablos	4	Chris DeCarlo	Todd Pletcher	Burning Sands Stable	1-1/8	1:51.84	
2011	Ron the Greek	4	Junior Alvarado	Bill Mott	Brous Stable/Wachtel Stable/Hammer	1-3/16	1:56.84	G3
2010	More Than a Reason	5	Eddie Castro	Randy Persaud	Anthony Calabrese	1-3/16	1:57.69	G3
2009	Rodman	4	Javier Castellano	Michael E. Hushion	Barry K. Schwartz	1-3/16	1:57.00	G3
2008	Researcher	4	Mike Luzzi	Jeff C. Runco	Rutledge Farm	1-3/16	1:55.87	G3
2007	Evening Attire	9	Edgar Prado	Patrick J. Kelly	T. J. Kelly/Joseph & Mary Grant	1-3/16	1:58.01	G3
2006	Magna Graduate	4	John Velazquez	Todd Pletcher	Elisabeth Alexander	1-3/16	1:55.19	G3
2005	Philanthropist	4	Eibar Coa	Claude R. McGaughey III	Phipps Stable	1-3/16	1:56.99	G3
2004	Classic Endeavor	6	Aaron Gryder	Richard E. Dutrow Jr.	Sullivan Lane, Scuderi	1-3/16	1:57.13	G3
2003	Thunder Blitz	5	Jorge F. Chavez	Richard E. Dutrow Jr.	Stronach Stable	1-3/16	1:55.90	G3
2002	Snake Mountain	4	José A. Santos	James A. Jerkens	Berkshire Stud, et al.	1-3/16	1:56.84	G3
2001	Evening Attire	3	Shaun Bridgmohan	Patrick J. Kelly	Mary Grant	1-3/16	1:55.08	G3
2000	Boston Party	4	Norberto Arroyo Jr.	Leonard Imperio	Ann Fostock	1-3/16	1:56.32	G3
1999	Early Warning	4	Jorge F. Chavez	Todd Pletcher	Dogwood Stable	1-3/16	1:55.03	G3
1998	Fire King	5	Frank Lovato Jr.	Michael E. Hushion	Schwartz & Hauman	1-3/16	1:56.88	G3
1997	Mr. Sinatra	3	Richard Migliore	Gasper Moschera	Barbara J. Davis	1-3/16	1:55.68	G3
1996	Topsy Robsy	4	Paula-Keim Bruno	H. Allen Jerkens	Hobeau Farm	1-3/16	1:55.30	G3
1995	Aztec Empire	5	Jean-Luc Samyn	H. Allen Jerkens	Hobeau Farm	1-3/16	1:55.56	G3
1994	Federal Funds	5	Dennis Carr	Murray M. Garren	Murray M. Garren	1-3/16	1:56.42	G3
1993	Repletion	4	Mike E. Smith	William I. Mott	Bud C. Hatfield	1-3/16	1:44.35	G3
1992	Shots Are Ringing	5	John Velazquez	Peter Ferriola	Jewel E. Stable	1-3/16	1:54.90	G3
1991	Nome	5	Eddie Maple	Peter Ferriola	James Riccio	1-3/16	1:56.00	G3
1990	Sport View	3	Craig Perret	D. Wayne Lukas	Edward A. Cox Jr.	1-3/16	1:57.00	G3
1989	Its Academic	5	Jerry D. Bailey	Luis Barrera	Marcus Vogel	1-3/16	1:58.00	G3
1988	Lay Down	4	Jean-Luc Samyn	Claude R. McGaughey III	Ogden Mills Phipps	1-3/16	1:57.20	G3
1987	Personal Flag	4	Randy Romero	Claude R. McGaughey III	Ogden Phipps	1-3/16	1:59.00	G3
1986	Pine Belt	4	Eddie Maple	George R. Arnold II	Loblolly Stable	1-3/16	1:57.20	G3
1985	Late Act	6	Eddie Maple	Robert Reinacher	Greentree Stable	1-3/16	1:55.80	G3
1984	Puntivo	4	Robbie Davis	Edward I. Kelly	Kalmia Hill Stable	1-3/16	1:58.00	G3
1983	Country Pine	3	Jerry Bailey	Lou Rondinello	Daniel M. Galbreath	1-3/16	1:58.00	G3
1982	Bar Dexter	5	Jeffrey Fell	Lou Mondello	Woodside Stud	1-3/16	1:58.20	G3
1981	French Cut	4	Don MacBeth	Robert DeBonis	Gertrude A. Martin	1-3/16	1:56.40	
1980	Fool's Prayer	5	Jorge Velásquez	Lou Rondinello	Darby Dan Farm	1-3/16	1:56.00	
1979	Dewan Keys	4	Eddie Maple	Philip G. Johnson	Joseph O. Morrissey	1-3/16	1:56.80	G3
1978	Cum Laude Laurie	4	Ángel Cordero Jr.	Lou Rondinello	Daniel M. Galbreath	1-3/16	1:55.80	G3
1977	Cox's Ridge	3	Eddie Maple	Joseph B. Cantey	Loblolly Stable	1-3/16	1:55.80	G3
1976	It's Freezing	4	Jacinto Vásquez	Anthony L. Basile	Bwamazon Farm	1-3/16	1:56.60	G3
1975	Hail The Pirates	5	Ron Turcotte	Lou Rondinello	Daniel M. Galbreath	1-3/16	1:55.60	G3
1974	Free Hand	4	Jose Amy	Pancho Martin	Sigmund Sommer	1-3/16	1:55.00	G2
1973	True Knight	4	Ángel Cordero Jr.	Lou Rondinello	Darby Dan Farm	1-3/16	1:55.00	G2
1972	Sunny And Mild	3	Michael Venezia	W. Preston King	Harry Rogosin	1-3/16	1:54.40	
1971	Red Reality	5	Jorge Velásquez	MacKenzie Miller	Cragwood Stables	1-1/8	1:49.60	
1970	Best Turn	4	Larry Adams	Reggie Cornell	Calumet Farm	1-1/8	1:50.00	
1969	Vif	4	Larry Adams	Clarence Meaux	Harvey Peltier Sr.	1-1/8	1:49.20	
1968	Irish Dude	4	Sandino Hernandez	Jack Bradley	Richard W. Taylor	1-1/8	1:49.60	
1967	Mr. Right	4	Heliodoro Gustines	Evan S. Jackson	Cheray Duchin	1-1/8	1:49.60	
1966	Amberoid	3	Walter Blum	Lucien Laurin	Reginald N. Webster	1-1/8	1:50.60	
1965	Prairie Schooner	4	Eddie Belmonte	James W. Smith	High Tide Stable	1-1/8	1:50.20	
1964	Third Martini	5	William Boland	H. Allen Jerkens	Hobeau Farm	1-1/8	1:50.60	
1963	Uppercut	4	Manuel Ycaza	Willard C. Freeman	William Harmonay	1-1/8	1:35.40	
1962	Grid Iron Hero	3	Manuel Ycaza	Laz Barrera	Emil Dolce	1 mile	1:34.00	
1961	Manassa Mauler	5	Braulio Baeza	Pancho Martin	Emil Dolce	1 mile	1:36.20	
1960	Cranberry Sauce	3	Heliodoro Gustines	Walter A. Kelley	Elmendorf Farm	1 mile	1:36.20	
1959	Whitley	4	Eric Guerin	Max Hirsch	W. Arnold Hanger	1 mile	1:36.40	
1958	Oh Johnny	5	William Boland	Norman R. McLeod	Mrs. Wallace Gilroy	1-1/16	1:43.40	
1957	Bold Ruler	3	Eddie Arcaro	James E. Fitzsimmons	Wheatley Stable	1-1/16	1:42.80	
1956	Blessbull	5	Willie Lester	Woody Stephens	Morris Sims	1-1/16	1:42.00	
1955	Fabulist	4	Ted Atkinson	William C. Winfrey	High Tide Stable	1-1/16	1:43.60	
1954	Find	4	Eric Guerin	William C. Winfrey	Alfred G. Vanderbilt II	1-1/16	1:44.00	
1953	Flaunt	4	Sidney Cole	Hubert W. Williams	Arnold Skjeveland	1-1/16	1:44.20	
1952	County Delight	5	Dave Gorman	James E. Ryan	Rokeby Stable	1-1/16	1:43.60	
1951	Sheilas Reward	4	Ovie Scurlock	Eugene Jacobs	Mrs. Louis Lazare	1-1/16	1:44.60	
1950	Three Rings	5	Hedley Woodhouse	Willie Knapp	Mrs. Evelyn L. Hopkins	1-1/16	1:44.60	
1949	Three Rings	4	Ted Atkinson	Willie Knapp	Mrs. Evelyn L. Hopkins	1-1/16	1:47.40	
1948	Knockdown	5	Ferril Zufelt	Tom Smith	Maine Chance Farm	1-1/16	1:44.60	
1947	Gallorette	5	Job Dean Jessop	Edward A. Christmas	William L. Brann	1-1/16	1:45.40	
1946	Helioptic	4	Paul Miller	Harris B. Brown	William Goadby Loew	1-1/16	1:43.20	
1945	Olympic Zenith	4	Conn McCreary	William M. Booth	William G. Helis	1-1/16	1:45.60	
1944	First Fiddle	5	Johnny Longden	Edward Mulrenan	Mrs. Edward Mulrenan	1-1/16	1:44.20	
1943	The Rhymer	5	Conn McCreary	John M. Gaver Sr.	Greentree Stable	1-1/16	1:45.00	
1942	Waller	4	Billie Thompson	A. G. "Bob" Robertson	John C. Clark	1-1/16	1:44.00	
1941	Salford II	5	Don Meade	T Murphy	Ralph B. Strassburger	1-1/16	1:44.20	
1940	He Did	7	Eddie Arcaro	J. Thomas Taylor	W. Arnold Hanger	1-1/16	1:43.20	
1939	Lovely Night	3	Johnny Longden	Henry McDaniel	Mrs. F. Ambrose Clark	1 mile	1:36.40	
1938	War Admiral	4	Charles Kurtsinger	George Conway	Glen Riddle Farm	1 mile	1:36.80	
1937	Snark	4	Johnny Longden	James E. Fitzsimmons	Wheatley Stable	1 mile	1:37.40	
1936	Good Gamble	4	Sam Renick	Joseph H. Stotler	Alfred G. Vanderbilt II	1 mile	1:37.20	
1935	King Saxon	4	Calvin Rainey	Charles Shaw	Charles H. Knebelkamp	1 mile	1:37.20	
1934	Singing Wood	3	Robert Jones	James W. Healy	Liz Whitney	1 mile	1:38.60	
1933	Kerry Patch	3	Robert Wholey	Joseph A. Notter	Lee Rosenberg	1 mile	1:38.00	
1932	Halcyon	4	Hank Mills	T. J. Healey	C. V. Whitney	1 mile	1:38.00	
1931	Halcyon	3	G. Rose	T. J. Healey	C. V. Whitney	1 mile	1:38.40	
1930	Kildare	4	John Passero	Norman Tallman	Newtondale Stable	1 mile	1:38.60	
1929	Comstockery	3	Sidney Hebert	Thomas W. Murphy	Greentree Stable	1 mile	1:39.60	
1928	Kentucky II	4	George Schreiner	Max Hirsch	A. Charles Schwartz	1 mile	1:38.80	
1927	Light Carbine	4	James McCoy	Michael Joseph Dunleavy	Ira B. Humphreys	1 mile	1:36.80	
1926	Macaw	3	Linus McAtee	James G. Rowe Sr.	Harry Payne Whitney	1 mile	1:37.00	
1925	Mad Play	4	Laverne Fator	Sam Hildreth	Rancocas Stable	1 mile	1:36.60	
1924	Mad Hatter	8	Earl Sande	Sam Hildreth	Rancocas Stable	1 mile	1:36.60	
1923	Zev	3	Earl Sande	Sam Hildreth	Rancocas Stable	1 mile	1:37.00	
1922	Grey Lag	4	Laverne Fator	Sam Hildreth	Rancocas Stable	1 mile	1:38.00	
1921	John P. Grier	4	Frank Keogh	James G. Rowe Sr.	Harry Payne Whitney	1 mile	1:36.00	
1920	Cirrus	4	Lavelle Ensor	Sam Hildreth	Sam Hildreth	1 mile	1:38.00	
1919	Star Master	5	Merritt C. Buxton	Walter B. Jennings	A. Kingsley Macomber	1 mile	1:37.60	
1918	Roamer	7	Lawrence Lyke	A. J. Goldsborough	Andrew Miller	1 mile	1:36.60	
1917	Old Rosebud	6	Frank Robinson	Frank D. Weir	F. D. Weir & Hamilton C. Applegate	1 mile	1:37.60	
1916	Short Grass	8	Frank Keogh	not found	Emil Herz	1 mile	1:36.40	
1915	Roamer	4	James Butwell	A. J. Goldsborough	Andrew Miller	1 mile	1:39.20	
1914	Flying Fairy	4	Tommy Davies	J. Simon Healy	Edward B. Cassatt	1 mile	1:42.20	
1913	No Race							
1912	No Race							
1911	No Race							
1910	Arasee	5	Buddy Glass	Andrew G. Blakely	Samuel Emery	1 mile	1:39.80	
1909	No Race							
1908	Jack Atkin	4	Phil Musgrave	Herman R. Brandt	Barney Schreiber	1 mile	1:39.00	
1907	W. H. Carey	4	George Mountain	James Blute	Richard F. Carman	1 mile	1:40.00	
1906	Ram's Horn	4	L. Perrine	W. S. "Jim" Williams	W. S. "Jim" Williams	1 mile	1:39.40	
1905	St. Valentine	4	William Crimmins	John Shields	Alexander Shields	1 mile	1:39.20	
1904	Rosetint	4	Tommy Burns	James Boden	John Boden	1 mile	1:39.20	
1903	Yellow Tail	6	Willie Shaw	Henry E. Rowell	John Hackett	1m, 70 yd	1:45.20	
1902	Margraviate	4	Otto Wonderly	M. Wolfe	Charles Fleischmann Sons	1m, 70 yd	1:46.00	
