= Mad Play =

American-bred Thoroughbred racehorse

- Sire: Fair Play
- Grandsire: Hastings
- Dam: Mad Cap
- Damsire: Rock Sand
- Sex: Stallion
- Foaled: 1921
- Country: USA
- Colour: Chestnut
- Breeder: August Belmont, Jr.
- Owner: Rancocas Stable
- Trainer: Sam Hildreth
- Earnings: $139,769

Major wins
- Belmont Stakes (1924); Brookdale Handicap (1924); Continental Handicap (1924); Yorktown Handicap (1924); Long Beach Handicap (1925); Brooklyn Handicap (1925); Queens County Handicap (1925); Empire City Handicap (1925); Chicago Special (1925); Saratoga Cup (1925); Triple Crown Race wins: Belmont Stakes (1924)
- Last updated on September 21, 2007

Mad Play (foaled 1921 in Kentucky) was an American-bred Thoroughbred racehorse. Bred by August Belmont, Jr., he was sired by Fair Play, who also sired Man o' War, out of a Rock Sand mare, Mad Cap. He was a full brother to 1921 U.S. Champion Older Male Horse Mad Hatter.

== Race career ==
Mad Play was trained by Sam Hildreth and he was ridden by Earl Sande. As a three-year-old, Mad Play came in third in the Preakness Stakes and second in the Dwyer Stakes, but is best known for winning the Belmont Stakes as the favorite to win by 1½ lengths, making it a third win for his owner, Harry Sinclair, of Rancocas Stable. He then won the Brookdale Handicap, the Continental Handicap, and the Yorktown Handicap.

He placed third in the International Special No. 3 that year at Latonia Race Track in Convington, Kentucky, losing to Sarazen.

At four, he won the Long Beach Handicap, Brooklyn Handicap, the Queens County Handicap, the Empire City Handicap, the Chicago Special and the Saratoga Cup to be the leading handicapper with a 13-7-3-3 record.

== Retirement ==
Upon retirement Mad Play, was found to be completely sterile. He was put back into training in 1928 and raced until 1933.

== Resources ==
- Pedigree & Part Stats
- TB Heritage Fairplay - Mad Play
- Time Mad Play's Belmont
