= Evening Attire Stakes =

- Class: Ungraded stakes
- Location: Aqueduct Racetrack; Queens, New York, United States
- Inaugurated: 1902
- Race type: Thoroughbred – Flat racing
- Website: www.nyra.com/index_aqueduct.html

Race information
- Distance: 1 1/16 miles (8.5 furlongs)
- Surface: Dirt
- Track: left-handed
- Qualification: Three-year-olds and up
- Weight: Handicap
- Purse: $100,000 Added

The race is an American Thoroughbred horse race held annually at Aqueduct Racetrack in Queens, New York. It was called the Aqueduct Handicap, but beginning in 2009, the name was changed to the Evening Attire Stakes in honor of the great grey gelding Evening Attire. He raced until he was 10 years old, retiring in 2008. The race is an ungraded stakes event run on dirt at a distance of 1 1/16 miles, it is open to horses three years old and up.

On November 28, 2007, this Grade III stakes race was downgraded to an ungraded stakes by the American Graded Stakes Committee.

Originally named for the racetrack where the inaugural race took place in 1902, until recently, it was mostly run on Labor Day but now is held in January. (It was run in late February in 2015.) The race did not take place from 1910 through 1916, 1924, 1956 through 1958, 1969 through 1972, 1974–1975, and in 1979. The 2010 edition marked its 91st running.

In 1961, the Aqueduct Handicap was run at Belmont Park.

The race was renamed the Aqueduct Stakes from 1962 to 1965 and in 1967 and 1968. In 1973 it was restricted to 2-year-old horses and was won by Cannonade who went on to win the 1974 Kentucky Derby.

On January 17, 2009, it was run as the Evening Attire Stakes.

The race's distance has been altered four times:

- 1 5/16 miles : 1920 through 1924
- 1 1/8 miles : 1917 through 1919, 1926 through 1932, and from 1961 through 1973
- 1 mile : 1976
- 1 1/16 miles : 1977 to present

== Winners of the Evening Attire Stakes since 1959 ==
| Year | Winner | Age | Jockey | Trainer | Owner | Time |
|---|---|---|---|---|---|---|
| 2015 | North Slope | 5 | Junior Alvarado | Kiaran McLaughlin | Godolphin Racing | 1:45.45 |
| 2014 | Long River | 4 | Irad Ortiz Jr. | Kiaran McLaughlin | Darley Stable | 1:44.71 |
| 2013 | Last Gunfighter | 4 | Irad Ortiz Jr. | Chad C. Brown | John D. Gunther | 1:43.54 |
| 2012 | Redding Colliery | 6 | Alan Garcia | Kiaran McLaughlin | Mrs. Fitriani Hay | 1:43.05 |
| 2011 | Heart Butte | 4 | David Cohen | Todd Pletcher | Claude Paul | 1:46.08 |
| 2010 | Understatement | 5 | David Cohen | Todd Pletcher | Paul Pompa Jr. | 1:42.94 |
| 2009 | Barrier Reef | 4 | Ramon A. Dominguez | Thomas Albertrani | Darley Stable | 1:43.81 |
| 2008 | Angliana | 6 | Alan Garcia | Kiaran McLaughlin | Alvin D. Haynes | 1:43.25 |
| 2007 | Liquor Cabinet | 6 | Ramon A. Dominguez | Richard E. Dutrow Jr. | Edward P. Evans | 1:43.66 |
| 2006 | Happy Hunting | 5 | Norberto Arroyo Jr. | C. R. McGaughey III | Phipps Stable | 1:44.56 |
| 2005 | Country Be Gold | 8 | Jose Espinoza | Steven Kappes | B. Seinfeld & E. Dodson | 1:44.80 |
| 2004 | Seattle Fitz | 5 | Aaron Gryder | Kiaran McLaughlin | West Point Stable | 1:42.00 |
| 2003 | Snake Mountain | 5 | Michael Luzzi | James A. Jerkens | Berkshire Stud et al. | 1:44.00 |
| 2002 | Evening Attire | 4 | Shaun Bridgmohan | Patrick J. Kelly | Grant, Grant, Kelly | 1:42.60 |
| 2001 | Liberty Gold | 7 | Joe Bravo | George Arnold II | John Peace | 1:42.20 |
| 2000 | Sky Approval | 6 | Cornelio Velásquez | Patrick J. Kelly | Live Oak Plantation | 1:44.40 |
| 1999 | Mr. Sinatra | 5 | Aaron Gryder | Gasper Moschera | Barbara J. Davis | 1:43.11 |
| 1998 | Star of Valor | 5 | Aaron Gryder | John Terranova II | Team Valor | 1:42.48 |
| 1997 | Pacific Fleet | 5 | Jorge Chavez | Alfredo Callejas | Robert Perez | 1:43.45 |
| 1996 | Mighty Magee | 4 | Michael Luzzi | Leon Blusiewicz | Allan H. Spath | 1:43.89 |
| 1995 | Danzig's Dance | 6 | Jorge Chavez | John Parisella | Karen S. Zablowitz | 1:41.13 |
| 1994 | As Indicated | 4 | Robbie Davis | Richard Schosberg | Heatherwood Farm | 1:45.60 |
| 1993 | Shots Are Ringing | 6 | John Velazquez | Peter Ferriola | Jewel E Stable | 1:44.40 |
| 1992 | Formal Dinner | 5 | Julio Pezua | D. Wayne Lukas | Leonard D. Mathis | 1:43.60 |
| 1991 | Sports View | 4 | Jerry D. Bailey | D. Wayne Lukas | Edward A. Cox Jr. | 1:43.40 |
| 1990 | Congeleur | 5 | Ángel Cordero Jr. | Richard O'Connell | Cap-Rus Stable | 1:44.80 |
| 1989 | Lord Of The Night | 6 | Herb McCauley | Dominick Galluscio | Winbound Farms | 1:42.80 |
| 1988 | Clever Secret | 4 | E. T. Baird | D. Wayne Lukas | Eugene V. Klein | 1:45.20 |
| 1987 | King's Swan | 7 | José A. Santos | Richard E. Dutrow Sr. | Alvin Akman | 1:41.80 |
| 1986 | Aggressive Bid | 5 | Michael Venezia | Robert G. Dunham | Four Fifths Stable | 1:43.80 |
| 1985 | Fight Over | 4 | Ángel Cordero Jr. | John Parisella | Theodore M. Sabarese | 1:42.60 |
| 1984 | Moro | 5 | Jean-Luc Samyn | Gasper S. Moschera | Albert Davis | 1:43.40 |
| 1983 | Fort Monroe | 4 | Victor Molina | Sidney Watters Jr. | Stephen C. Clark Jr. | 1:42.40 |
| 1982 | Reef Searcher | 5 | Ángel Cordero Jr. | Jack D. Ludwig | John A. Franks | 1:48.40 |
| 1981 | Irish Tower | 4 | Jeffrey Fell | Stanley M. Hough | Malcolm H. Winfield | 1:44.60 |
| 1980 | Charlie Coast | 5 | Jimmy Miranda | Warren J. Pascuma | Bette S. Karlinsky | 1:44.80 |
| 1978 | Wise Philip | 5 | Jacinto Vásquez | William Boland | Domino Stable | 1:43.80 |
| 1977 | Magnetizer | 4 | Angel Santiago | H. Allen Jerkens | Peter E. Blum | 1:45.40 |
| 1976 | Right Mind | 5 | Ron Turcotte | Joseph Kronovich | Deronjo Stable | 1:38.80 |
| 1973 | Cannonade | 2 | Pete D. Anderson | Woody Stephens | John M. Olin | 1:51.60 |
| 1968 | Damascus | 4 | Braulio Baeza | Frank Y. Whiteley Jr. | Edith W. Bancroft | 1:48.40 |
| 1967 | Damascus | 3 | Bill Shoemaker | Frank Y. Whiteley Jr. | Edith W. Bancroft | 1:48.20 |
| 1966 | Tom Rolfe | 4 | Bill Shoemaker | Frank Y. Whiteley Jr. | Powhatan Stable | 1:52.20 |
| 1965 | Malicious III | 4 | Bobby Ussery | John M. Gaver Sr. | Greentree Stable | 1:49.00 |
| 1964 | Kelso | 7 | Ismael Valenzuela | Carl Hanford | Bohemia Stable | 1:48.60 |
| 1963 | Kelso | 6 | Ismael Valenzuela | Carl Hanford | Bohemia Stable | 1:49.80 |
| 1962 | Crozier | 4 | Braulio Baeza | Julius E. Tinsley Jr. | Fred W. Hooper | 1:48.80 |
| 1961 | Tompion | 4 | John L. Rotz | Robert L. Wheeler | C. V. Whitney | 1:47.40 |
| 1960 | Bald Eagle | 5 | Manuel Ycaza | Woody Stephens | Cain Hoy Stable | 1:34.80 |
| 1959 | Hillsdale | 4 | Tommy Barrow | Martin L. Fallon | Clarence Whitted Smith | 1:36.40 |

* Sun Edwin (1930), Dominus (1933), King's Swan (1988), and Shots Are Ringing (1992) all finished first but were disqualified.

== Earlier winners ==
- 1955 – Icarian
- 1954 – Crash Drive
- 1953 – First Aid
- 1952 – Bryan G.
- 1951 – Bryan G.
- 1950 – Wine List
- 1949 – Wine List
- 1948 – Stymie
- 1947 – Stymie
- 1946 – Coincidence
- 1945 – New Moon
- 1944 – Alex Barth
- 1943 – With Regards
- 1942 – Pictor
- 1941 – Ponty
- 1940 – War Dog
- 1939 – Volitant
- 1938 – Isolater
- 1937 – Caballero II
- 1936 – Action
- 1935 – Good Gamble
- 1934 – Coequel
- 1933 – Golden Way
- 1932 – Blenheim III
- 1931 – Curate
- 1930 – Black Mammy
- 1929 – Sun Beau
- 1928 – Chance Play
- 1927 – Black Maria
- 1926 – Black Maria
- 1925 – Dazzler
- 1923 – My Play
- 1922 – Prince James
- 1921 – Damask
- 1920 – John P. Grier
- 1919 – Lucullite
- 1918 – Corn Tassel
- 1917 – Roamer
- 1909 – Firestone
- 1908 – Monfort
- 1907 – Brookdale Bymph
- 1906 – Rye
- 1905 – Bedouin
- 1904 – Israelite
- 1903 – Wild Thyme
- 1902 – Glenwater
