= Mad Hatter (horse) =

American-bred Thoroughbred racehorse

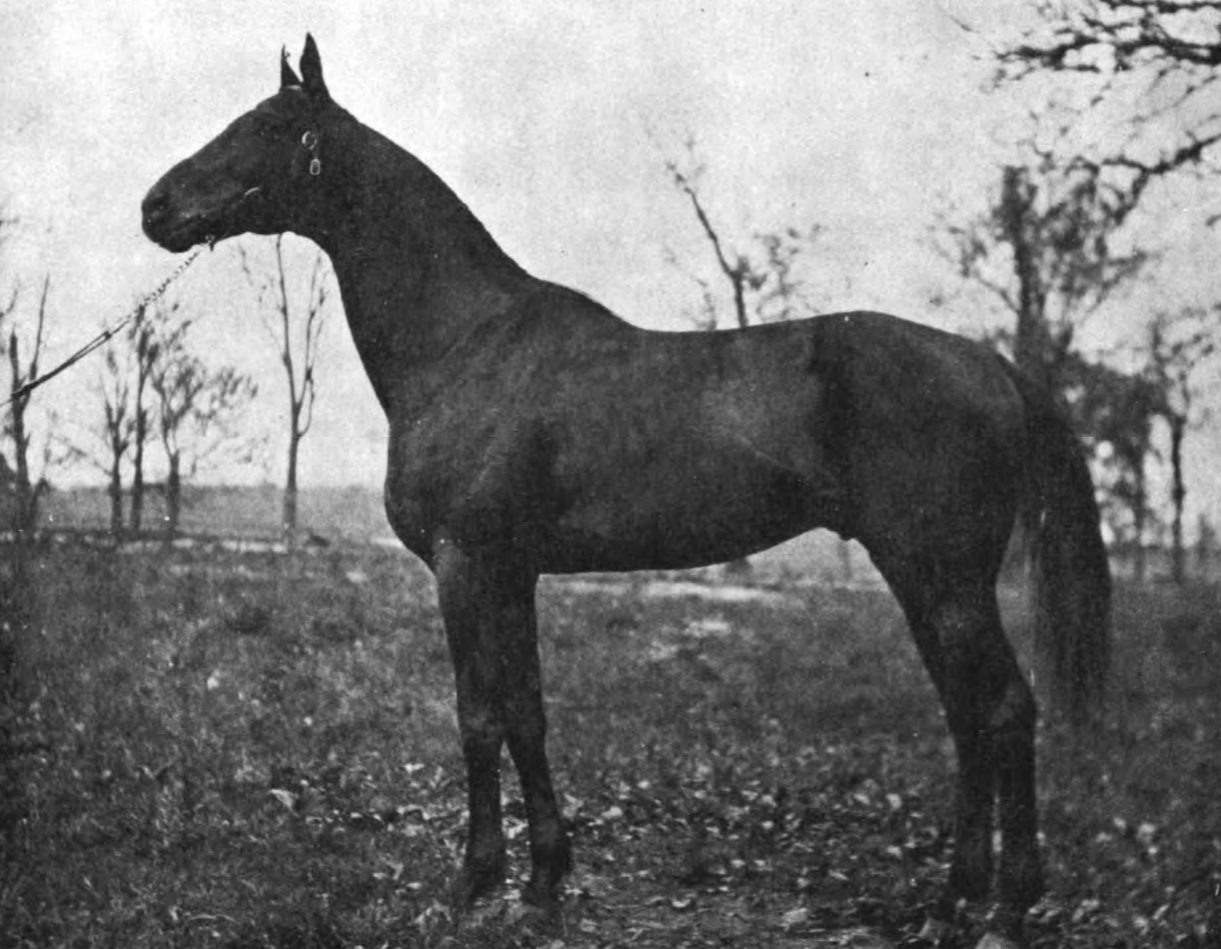
- Mad Hatter
- Sire: Fair Play
- Grandsire: Hastings
- Dam: Mad Cap
- Damsire: Rock Sand
- Sex: Stallion
- Foaled: 1916
- Country: United States
- Colour: Dark bay/Brown
- Breeder: August Belmont, Jr.
- Owner: Rancocas Stable
- Trainer: Sam Hildreth
- Record: 41: 16-10-4
- Earnings: $70,290

Major wins
- Bellerose Stakes (1918); Pimlico Autumn Handicap (1919); Minneola Handicap (1919); Latonia Championship Stakes (1919); Yorktown Handicap (1920); Bowie Handicap (1920); Jockey Club Gold Cup (1921, 1922); Metropolitan Handicap (1921, 1922); Champlain Handicap (1922); Pierrepont Handicap (1922); Toboggan Handicap (1923); Suburban Handicap (1924); Queens County Handicap (1924)

Awards
- U.S. Champion Older Male Horse (1921)
- Last updated on September 20, 2006

Mad Hatter (foaled 1916 in Kentucky) was an American-bred Thoroughbred racehorse who was named U.S. Champion Older Male Horse in 1921.

== Background ==
Bred by August Belmont, Jr., he was sired by the great Fair Play, the sire of Man o' War, out of another Rock Sand mare, Mad Cap. He was foaled one year earlier than Man o' War and was a full brother to Belmont Stakes winner Mad Play.

Trained by Sam Hildreth and ridden for most of his career by the great jockey Earl Sande, Mad Hatter was known as much for his erratic temperament as for his racing ability. Sande was one of the few jockeys that understood Mad Hatter, especially in his later years.

== Racing career ==
Late to mature, Mad Hatter was lightly raced and won the Bellerose Stakes as a two-year-old.

At three, he won the Minneola Handicap easily, having only been to the post twice before and never at more than a mile. Then he lost to Sir Barton in the Maryland Handicap at Laurel Park Racecourse, placing second after running fractions of :22 2/5, and :46 3/5. Sir Barton beat him by two lengths.

After winning the inaugural Latonia Championship Stakes over a muddy track by 8 lengths, Mad Hatter went to Pimlico Race Course in November in the Pimlico Autumn Handicap, beating Sir Barton, who placed a distant third, twelve lengths behind him. In his next race, the Saratoga Handicap, again against Sir Barton and Exterminator, he got into a speed duel with The Porter and placed last.

Mad Hatter won the 1920 Yorktown and Bowie Handicaps. In 1921, Mad Hatter had victories in the Jockey Club Gold Cup and the Metropolitan Handicap and was named U.S. Champion Older Male Horse.

Mad Hatter continued to win graded stakes races as a campaigner with a win in the Champlain Handicap plus a repeat win of the Jockey Club Gold Cup in 1922, the Toboggan Handicap in 1923, and the Suburban and Queens County Handicaps in 1924.

== Stud career ==
Fertility problems were reported for Mad Hatter. His brother, Belmont Stakes winner Mad Play, was completely sterile. However, out of 177 foals, Mad Hatter sired 23 graded stakes winners such as The Nut, Cocked Hat, Cresta Run, and the champion filly Snowflake.

== Resources ==
- Pedigree & Part Stats
- Thoroughbred Heritage: Fairplay - Mad Hatter
- New York Times Mad Hatter Minneola
