= Stymie (horse) =

American Thoroughbred racehorse

- Sire: Equestrian
- Grandsire: Equipoise
- Dam: Stop Watch
- Damsire: On Watch
- Sex: Stallion
- Foaled: 1941
- Country: United States
- Colour: Chestnut
- Breeder: Max Hirsch
- Owner: Ethel D. Jacobs
- Trainer: Max Hirsch; Hirsch Jacobs (from 4/43)
- Record: 131:35-33-28
- Earnings: $918,485

Major wins
- Brooklyn Handicap (1945); Butler Handicap (1945); Westchester Handicap (1945); Pimlico Cup (1945); Riggs Handicap (1945); Saratoga Cup (1945, 1946); Continental Handicap (1945); Grey Lag Handicap (1945, 1946); Gallant Fox Handicap (1946, 1947); New York Handicap (1946); Manhattan Handicap (1946); Edgemere Handicap (1946); Whitney Stakes (1946); Empire City Gold Cup (1947); Massachusetts Handicap (1947); Aqueduct Handicap (1947, 1948); Metropolitan Handicap (1947, 1948); Sussex Handicap (1947, 1948); Questionnaire Handicap (1947)

Awards
- U.S. Champion Handicap Horse (1945)

Honours
- U.S. Racing Hall of Fame (1975) #41 - Top 100 U.S. Racehorses of the 20th Century; The Stymie Handicap at Aqueduct Racetrack
- Last updated on February 7, 2007

Stymie (April 4, 1941 − 1962) was an American Thoroughbred racehorse.

== Background ==
Stymie, a chestnut horse with a narrow white blaze was bred by Max Hirsch and was born on King Ranch in Texas.

As a young horse, Stymie possessed so terrible a disposition that his ability to race was hampered; his trainer did not see much in him. Therefore, two of Stymie's first three starts were claiming races.

On June 2, 1943, Stymie was bought by Hirsch Jacobs, one of the time's leading trainers. Jacobs claimed the horse for $1,500 for his wife Ethel Jacobs.

Stymie raced ten more times before winning again. At that point, his record consisted of seven wins out of fifty starts.

== Racing career and wins ==
At age two, Stymie lost every race he ran in except one. He also placed in the Ardsley Handicap and showed in the Thomas K. Lynch Memorial Handicap. At age three, he lost most of his races. However, he came in second in the Wood Memorial Stakes and third in the Gallant Fox Handicap, Westchester Handicap, Riggs Handicap, Pimlico Cup Handicap, Flamingo Stakes, and Shevlin Stakes.

In 1945, the US government shut down racing for four months. Stymie was given a seven-month rest. He then won the Brooklyn Handicap, Butler Handicap, Westchester Handicap, Pimlico Cup, Riggs Handicap, Saratoga Cup, Continental Handicap, and Grey Lag Handicap. In addition, he came in second in the Suburban Handicap, Queens County Handicap, and Yonkers Handicap, and finished third in the Pimlico Special, Jockey Club Gold Cup, Whitney Stakes, and Merchants' and Citizens' Handicap. At age five, he won the Gallant Fox Handicap (beating the winner of the Triple Crown of Thoroughbred Racing, Assault), New York Handicap, Grey Lag Handicap, Manhattan Handicap, Edgemere Handicap, Whitney Stakes, and Saratoga Cup. He also placed in the Brooklyn Handicap, Dixie Handicap, Jockey Club Gold Cup, Monmouth Handicap, and Pimlico Special, and showed in the Suburban Handicap, Butler Handicap, Saratoga Handicap and Sussex Handicap.

At age six, Stymie won the Gold Cup, Gallant Fox Handicap, Massachusetts Handicap, Aqueduct Handicap, Metropolitan Handicap, Sussex Handicap, and Questionnaire Handicap, placed in the Brooklyn Handicap, Butler Handicap, Edgemere Handicap, Manhattan Handicap, and Queens County Handicap, and finished third in the Jockey Club Gold Cup and Whitney Stakes. When he was seven, he won the Aqueduct Handicap, Metropolitan Handicap, and Sussex Handicap, took second in the Suburban Handicap, Dixie Handicap, and Queens County Handicap, and was third in the Brooklyn Handicap and Excelsior Handicap. In his last year at eight, he was second in the New York Handicap.

In the 1948 Monmouth Handicap suffered a fractured sesamoid bone in his right foreleg. He returned in 1949 to continue his career as an eight year old but did not win in five starts.

== Career starts and wins ==
Out of 131 lifetime starts, Stymie won 35, placed in 33, and showed in 28. His career winnings were $918,485. That made him, at the time, the richest race horse in America.

At Suffolk Downs on July 7, 1947, Stymie became the first horse ever to eclipse the $700,000 earnings mark. He was so heavily bet that a minus show pool of $25,887 was created that day, and the tote board briefly jammed due to the flood of money wagered on him.

== Legacy ==
A grandson of Equipoise and inbred to Man O' War, Stymie died in 1962. He was elected to the National Museum of Racing and Hall of Fame in 1975. In The Blood-Horse magazine ranking of the top 100 U.S. thoroughbred champions of the 20th Century, he is ranked #41.

Jacobs, who died in 1970, was elected as a trainer to the National Museum of Racing and Hall of Fame in 1958. He and his wife named their Sparks, Maryland, breeding operation Stymie Manor.
