= Saratoga Breeders' Cup Handicap =

- Class: Discontinued stakes
- Location: Saratoga Race Course; Saratoga Springs, New York, United States
- Inaugurated: 2017
- Race type: Thoroughbred - Flat racing

Race information
- Distance: 1 1/4 miles
- Surface: Dirt
- Track: left-handed
- Qualification: Three-year-olds and up
- Purse: $250,000

The Saratoga Breeders' Cup Handicap was a Grade II Thoroughbred race for horses three-years-old and up run on dirt at Saratoga Race Course in New York from 1994 through 2005. From 1994 through 1996, it was run as the Saratoga Cup Handicap, the name of another race that was run from 1865 through 1955.

A Grade II event, it was set at a distance of 1 1/8 miles for its inaugural running but changed in 1995 to 1 1/4 miles. It offered a purse of $250,000.

== Records ==
Speed record:

- 2:00.83 @ 1¼ miles - Evening Attire (2004)

Most wins:

- 2 - L'Carriere (1995, 1996)
- 2 - Evening Attire (2002, 2004)

Most wins by a jockey:

- 3 - Jorge Chavez (1996, 2000, 2003)

Most wins by a trainer:

- 3 - H. James Bond (1995, 1996, 2000)

Most wins by an owner:

- 2 - Virginia Kraft Payson (1995, 1996)
- 2 - Joseph & Mary Grant, Tommy J. Kelly

== Winners ==
Year	Winner	Age	Jockey	Trainer	Owner	Dist. (Miles)	Time	Purse
2005	Suave	4	John Velazquez	Paul J. McGee	Jay Em Ess Stable (Mace & Samantha Siegel)	11/4	2:03.38	$250,000
2004	Evening Attire	6	Cornelio Velásquez	Patrick J. Kelly	Joseph & Mary Grant, Tommy J. Kelly	11/4	2:00.83	$250,000
2003	Puzzlement	4	Jorge Chavez	H. Allen Jerkens	Joseph V. Shields Jr.	11/4	2:03.54	$300,000
2002	Evening Attire	4	Shaun Bridgmohan	Patrick J. Kelly	Joseph & Mary Grant, Tommy J. Kelly	11/4	2:02.95	$300,000
2001	Aptitude	4	Jerry Bailey	Robert J. Frankel	Juddmonte Farms	11/4	2:01.55	$300,000
2000	Pleasant Breeze	5	Jorge Chavez	H. James Bond	William L. Clifton Jr.	11/4	2:02.17	$300,000
1999	Running Stag	5	Shane Sellers	Philip Mitchell	Richard Cohen	11/4	2:01.11	$300,000
1998	Awesome Again	4	Pat Day	Patrick B. Byrne	Stronach Stables	11/4	2:03.14	$300,000
1997	Cairo Express	5	Jean-Luc Samyn	Mohammed Moubarak	Buckram Oak Farm (Mahmoud Fustok)	11/4	2:03.99	$200,000
1996	L'Carriere	5	Jorge Chavez	H. James Bond	Virginia Kraft Payson	11/4	2:01.67	$200,000
1995	L'Carriere	4	Jerry Bailey	H. James Bond	Virginia Kraft Payson	11/4	2:02.87	$200,000
1994	Thunder Rumble	5	Richard Migliore	Richard O'Connell	Braeburn Farm (Konrad & Ursula Widner)	11/8	1:48.52	$250,000

== See also ==
- New York Racing Association
