= Black Maria (horse) =

American-bred Thoroughbred racehorse

- Sire: Black Toney
- Grandsire: Peter Pan
- Dam: Bird Loose
- Damsire: Sardanapale
- Sex: Mare
- Foaled: 1923
- Country: United States
- Color: Black
- Breeder: William R. Coe
- Owner: William R. Coe
- Trainer: William H. Karrick
- Record: 52: 18–14–6
- Earnings: US$110,350

Major wins
- Kentucky Oaks (1926); Twin City Handicap (1926); Ladies Handicap (1926, 1927); Illinois Oaks (1926); Aqueduct Handicap (1926, 1927); Saratoga Sales Stakes (1926); Metropolitan Handicap (1927); Continental Handicap (1927); Edgemere Handicap (1927); Whitney Handicap (1928)

Awards
- American Champion Three-Year-Old Filly (1926); American Champion Older Female Horse (1927, 1928)

Black Maria (/məˈraɪə/ mə-RY-ə; 1923–1932) was an American Thoroughbred racing filly who earned national Champion honors three times.

== Background ==
Bred in Kentucky by William R. Coe, she was sired by Black Toney, the great foundation stallion of Idle Hour Stock Farm. Her dam was Bird Loose, a daughter of the French stallion Sardanapale, a two-time Leading sire in France who won the 1914 Prix du Jockey Club and, at the time France's most important race, the Grand Prix de Paris.

== Racing career ==
Black Maria raced as a two-year-old and won but did not claim victory in any of the top races for her age group. A filly who regularly raced against male horses, after winning the Kentucky Oaks for fillies, she defeated males in the Saratoga Sales Stakes and the Aqueduct Handicap. Her performances at age three earned her American Champion Three-Year-Old Filly honors. Black Maria was voted the 1927 and 1928 American Champion Older Female Horse, highlighted by her defeat of males in the preeminent race on the U.S. East Coast for milers, the Metropolitan Handicap in a performance that made The New York Times call her "a great race mare." At age five, she beat her male counterparts again to win the Whitney Handicap.

In 1932, Black Maria suffered a broken leg as a result of a paddock accident and was humanely destroyed.

== Name ==
She was named after an earlier world-famous black racehorse, the second element of whose name was pronounced /məˈraɪə/ mə-RY-ə in accordance with the traditional English pronunciation of Latin and Latin-based names always used at that time. The first Black Maria was foaled in Harlem, New York in 1826. She won so many races her purse winnings alone amounted to nearly $15,000, a very large sum for the period. Her most famous exploit occurred on 13 October 1832 when she won the race for the Jockey Club purse of $600 at the Union Course. In 1870, an article about her in Harper's New Monthly Magazine said: "The track was heavy, and yet, to achieve a victory, twenty miles had to be run. We wonder if there is a horse on the turf to-day that could stand up under such a performance as this?."

Her speed was implied in the nickname given to horse-drawn black (or dark blue) police prisoner vans of the period, swiftly whisking felons away from the scene of a crime. This name for a police van was adopted in Britain and even France where a similar term was already in use.

== Pedigree ==
Pedigree of Black Maria (USA), black mare, 1923
Sire Black Toney (USA) 1911	Peter Pan (USA); 1904	Commando	Domino
Sire Black Toney (USA) 1911	Peter Pan (USA); 1904	Commando	Emma C.
Sire Black Toney (USA) 1911	Peter Pan (USA); 1904	Cinderella	Hermit
Sire Black Toney (USA) 1911	Peter Pan (USA); 1904	Cinderella	Mazurka
Sire Black Toney (USA) 1911	Belgravia (USA); 1903	Ben Brush	Bramble
Sire Black Toney (USA) 1911	Belgravia (USA); 1903	Ben Brush	Roseville
Sire Black Toney (USA) 1911	Belgravia (USA); 1903	Bonnie Gal	Galopin
Sire Black Toney (USA) 1911	Belgravia (USA); 1903	Bonnie Gal	Bonnie Doon
Dam Bird Loose (FR) 1916	Sardanapale (FR); 1911	Prestige	Le Pompon
Dam Bird Loose (FR) 1916	Sardanapale (FR); 1911	Prestige	Orgueilleuse
Dam Bird Loose (FR) 1916	Sardanapale (FR); 1911	Gemma	Florizel II
Dam Bird Loose (FR) 1916	Sardanapale (FR); 1911	Gemma	Agnostic
Dam Bird Loose (FR) 1916	Poule Au Pot (FR); 1912	Verdun	Rabelais
Dam Bird Loose (FR) 1916	Poule Au Pot (FR); 1912	Verdun	Vellena
Dam Bird Loose (FR) 1916	Poule Au Pot (FR); 1912	Fouilleopo	Palais Royal
Dam Bird Loose (FR) 1916	Poule Au Pot (FR); 1912	Fouilleopo	Fourchette (Family: 14-a)
