= Hourless =

British-bred Thoroughbred racehorse

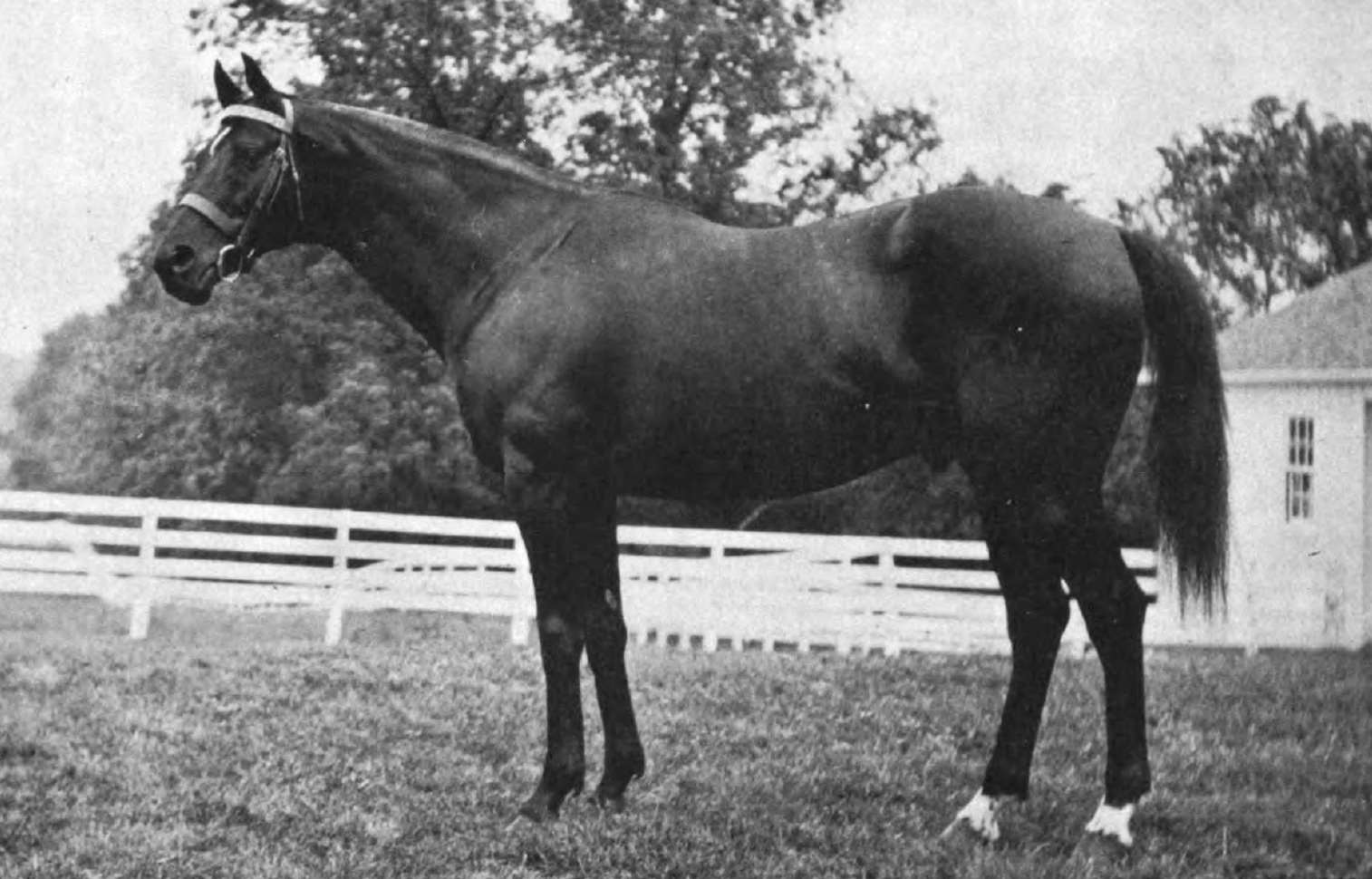
- From Thoroughbred types, 1900-1925
- Sire: Negofol
- Grandsire: Childwick
- Dam: Hour Glass
- Damsire: Rock Sand
- Sex: Stallion
- Foaled: 1914
- Country: Great Britain
- Colour: Dark Bay/Brown
- Breeder: August Belmont, Jr.
- Owner: August Belmont, Jr.
- Trainer: Sam Hildreth
- Record: 15: 9-1-2
- Earnings: $45,175

Major wins
- Juvenile Stakes (1916); Grand Union Hotel Stakes (1916); Eastern Shore Handicap (1916); Hopeful Stakes (1916); Annapolis Stakes (1916); Southampton Handicap (1917); Withers Stakes (1917); John R. McLean Memorial Championship (1917); American Classics wins: Belmont Stakes (1917)

Awards
- American Co-Champion 3-Yr-Old Male Horse (1917)
- Last updated on February 15, 2011

Hourless (1914–1935) was a British-born Thoroughbred racehorse who raced in the United States where he won the 1917 Belmont Stakes.

== Background ==
Bred at August Belmont, Jr.'s Haras de Villers in Foucarmont in Upper Normandy, France, he was foaled in England. He was sired by the French-bred Negofol; Negofol would later be imported to stand at Xalapa Farm in Kentucky, where he would sire the Preakness Stakes winner Coventry. His dam was Hour Glass, bred in France but then sent to England. Hourless was foaled at Southcourt Stud in Southcote, Bedfordshire, which was owned by Leopold de Rothschild. With World War I raging in Europe, in 1915 both Hour Glass and Hourless were exported to the United States.

== Racing career ==
Raced by August Belmont, Jr., Hourless was trained by future U.S. Racing Hall of Fame inductee Sam Hildreth. In 1916 he was one of the top two-year-olds in the United States and won a number of important races, including the Grand Union Hotel Stakes at Saratoga Race Course. For the year, he was ranked second only to Campfire.

In his three-year-old season no U.S. Triple Crown series had yet been formalized and Hourless did not run in the Kentucky Derby or the Preakness Stakes, which were held on the same day. Ridden in 1917 by another future Hall of Fame inductee, Jimmy Butwell, Hourless won the one–mile Withers Stakes and set a new record in winning the (then) 1 3/8–mile Belmont Stakes. After the other entrants were scratched, the October 18, 1917 John R. McLean Memorial Championship at Laurel Park Racecourse in Maryland turned into a match race between Hourless and Wilfrid Viau's Kentucky Derby winner, Omar Khayyam. Earlier that year, Omar Khayyam had beaten Hourless in the Lawrence Realization Stakes and in the Brooklyn Derby. This time, however, Hourless won by a length He retrospectively was named 1917 American Champion Three-Year-Old Male Horse, jointly with Omar Khayyam.

== Stud career ==
Retired to stud, Hourless sired Mike Hall, 1928 American Champion Older Male Horse and Charley O., winner of the 1930 Florida Derby. One of his best sons was Canadian Horse Racing Hall of Fame inductee and 1934 King's Plate winner, Horometer. Among Hourless' daughters was Late Date, 1935 American Champion Older Female Horse.

== See also ==
- Horometer
- Omar Khayyam (horse)
- Sam Hildreth
