= James H. Butwell =

American jockey

Jimmy Butwell
- James Butwell (1913)

Personal information
- Born: c. 1892 Michigan, United States
- Died: 1956
- Occupation: Jockey

Horse racing career
- Sport: Horse racing
- Career wins: 1,402

Major racing wins
- Flying Handicap (1909); Belmont Futurity Stakes (1909); Great Filly Stakes (1909); Flight Stakes (1909); Ladies Handicap (1909); Municipal Handicap (1909, 1914); Omnium Handicap (1909); Pierrepont Handicap (1909); Saratoga Cup (1909, 1915, 1917); Toboggan Handicap (1909, 1914); Twin City Handicap (1909); Withers Stakes (1909, 1913, 1917); Zephyr Stakes (1909); Adirondack Stakes (1910); Champlain Handicap (1910); Saratoga Handicap (1910, 1915, 1917); Surf Stakes (1910); Hamilton Derby (1912); Kentucky Oaks (1912); Juvenile Stakes (1913, 1917); Philadelphia Handicap (1913, 1921); Fleetwing Handicap (1914); Huron Handicap (1914, 1915); Matron Stakes (1914); Travers Stakes (1914, 1917); Tremont Stakes (1914, 1916); Aberdeen Stakes (1915); Havre de Grace Cup Handicap (1915); Queens County Handicap (1915); Excelsior Handicap (1916); Hudson Stakes (1917); Saranac Handicap (1917); Southampton Handicap (1917); Youthful Stakes (1917); Chesapeake Stakes (1920, 1923); Fall Highweight Handicap (1922); Remsen Stakes (1922) American Classic Race wins Preakness Stakes (1913); Belmont Stakes (1910, 1917) Canadian race wins: Victoria Stakes (1912); King Edward Stakes (1920); King's Plate (1921); Windsor Hotel Cup Handicap (1925); Toronto Cup Handicap (1926)

Racing awards
- United States Champion Jockey by earnings (1912); United States Champion Jockey by wins (1920)

Honours
- United States' Racing Hall of Fame (1984)

Significant horses
- Buskin, Jack Atkin, King James, Maskette, Sweep, Roamer, Olambala, Omar Khayyam, Herendesy, Hourless
- Updated on October 27, 2018

James H. "Jimmy" Butwell (c. 1892–1956) was an American Racing Hall of Fame jockey. His birth year placed at the Family Search.org website is stated as 1896. However, although there were no child labor laws in the United States, it seems unlikely that he would have been a professional jockey at age twelve. A Michigan native, before his successful time riding in the New York City area, Jimmy Butwell began his career at small race tracks in Nebraska and Colorado. Butwell rode for several prominent owners and in 1912, a year he led all North American riders in earnings, he rode Monocacy to victory for Harry Payne Whitney in the Victoria Stakes at Woodbine Racetrack in Toronto, Ontario, Canada. Of his four mounts in the Kentucky Derby, Butwell's best finish was third in the 1915 running. He won the 1913 Preakness Stakes and captured the 1910 Belmont Stakes and the 1917 Belmont Stakes. In 1920 Butwell had more race wins than any jockey in the United States and the following year rode Herendesy to victory in Canada's most prestigious race, the King's Plate.

Jimmy Butwell retired after riding in the 1928 season, then worked as a racing official. Living in Florida, he was working at Gulfstream Park when he died in 1956. He was inducted in the United States' Racing Hall of Fame in 1984.
