= Evening Attire (horse) =

American-bred Thoroughbred racehorse

- Sire: Black Tie Affair
- Dam: Concolour
- Damsire: Our Native
- Sex: Gelding
- Foaled: February 14, 1998
- Died: January 20, 2019 (aged 20)
- Country: United States
- Colour: Dappled Gray
- Breeder: Joseph M. Grant & Thomas J. Kelly
- Owner: Joseph & Mary Grant, Thomas J. Kelly
- Trainer: Timothy Kelly; Patrick J. Kelly
- Record: 69: 15-16-9
- Earnings: $2,977,130

Major wins
- Queens County Handicap (2001, 2007); Discovery Handicap (2001); Aqueduct Handicap (2002); Saratoga Breeders' Cup Handicap (2002, 2004); Jockey Club Gold Cup (2002); Red Smith Handicap (2002); Stuyvesant Handicap (2005); Stymie Handicap (2007); Greenwood Cup Stakes (2008)

Honours
- The Evening Attire Stakes at Aqueduct
- Last updated on December 29, 2008

Evening Attire (February 14, 1998 – January 20, 2019) was an American Thoroughbred racehorse who won 15 of his 65 starts in a 10-year racing career with earnings of nearly $3 million. A staple of the New York racing circuit, he scored his biggest victory in the Grade 1 2002 Jockey Club Gold Cup.

== History ==
Bred by Joseph M. Grant and Hall of Famer Thomas J. Kelly, and owned by Kelly along with his longtime clients Joe and Mary Grant, Evening Attire was first trained by Tommy's son Tim Kelly. When Tim retired, the horse was taken over by another of Tommy's sons, Pat Kelly. The first time Tommy Kelly watched him breeze, he said, "That's a special horse. He'll be a stakes winner."

Evening Attire was the son of 1991 Horse of the Year Black Tie Affair. Kelly purchased Evening Attire's dam, Concolor, from Doe Run Farm, one of his former clients. He invited Joe Grant, an old friend, to become a 50/50 partner in her offspring. Because of back and heart problems, he usually watched Evening Attire's races on television instead of attending them in person.

A dappled gray, Evening Attire was gelded before the start of his three-year-old racing season. As a gelding, Evening Attire raced until the age of ten. He raced well off the pace, often closing dramatically.

== Racing career ==
Evening Attire made his first start on July 16, 2000, in a maiden special weight race at Belmont Park, finishing second. He broke his maiden in his next start at Saratoga on August 6. He then stepped up in class to enter the Grade I Hopeful Stakes at Saratoga on September 2 but finished seventh. He then lost five straight races in allowance company in a 13-month span, during which time he was gelded. He finally returned to the winner's circle on October 31, 2001, in the Discovery Handicap, then followed up with a win in the Queen's County Handicap.

In 2002, he earned his most important win in the Jockey Club Gold Cup. That year, he also won the Aqueduct Handicap, Saratoga Breeders' Cup Handicap and Red Smith Handicap while also finishing fourth in the Breeders' Cup Classic. In 2003, Evening Attire earned only two allowance race wins but was second in both the Clark and Queens County Handicap and was third in both the Whitney and Jockey Club Gold Cup.

In 2004, the then six-year-old gelding made 11 starts with one win in the Saratoga Breeders' Cup Handicap and six runner-up placings. In 2005, he won the Stuyvesant Handicap, but he was winless in five starts.

On March 3, 2007, at odds of 8–1 and at the age of 9, he took the 52nd running of The Stymie by two and a half length, making a move at the 8th pole. The Aqueduct track writer wrote, "Evening Attire proved that age means little if you have class."

Evening Attire finished third in the 2007 Stuyvesant Handicap after hesitating at the start, a trait his trainer said the 10-year-old gelding developed in 2007. Evening Attire was entered in the 2007 Queens County Handicap at Aqueduct (a race he won in 2001) and took it by a head under veteran jockey Edgar Prado. He became the oldest horse ever to win the Queens County, which has been run since 1902. After the race (in which he defeated Hunting, who had won the 2007 Stuyvesant), Prado said: "He knows his way around the track. When he's right, he's pretty tough."

Though his trainer, Patrick Kelly, had thought to take Evening Attire out of stakes competition, NYRA stakes coordinator Andrew Byrnes convinced him to enter the horse in the June 6, 2008, Brooklyn Handicap at Belmont Park contested at a mile and a half. With Cornelio Velásquez aboard, ten-year-old Evening Attire placed, coming from sixteen lengths behind at the quarter pole and going down the center of the track to rapidly close on five-year-old Delosvientos. Delosvientos went wire to wire, but the slowly breaking Evening Attire got within two lengths of the winner. Patrick Kelly said, "In the barn today, he had his game face on early. I’m always happy when he's in the money. It was fun to try."

On July 19, 2008, in his first win outside the state of New York, Evening Attire won the Greenwood Cup Stakes at Philadelphia Park Racetrack by 8¼-lengths, breaking the 16-year-old track record. The previous track record of 2:31 flat for 1½ miles was set on January 4, 1992, by Laugh a Minute. Evening Attire's time was 2:29.90. Evening Attire was retired after the race.

=== Highlights ===
Although he was bred in Kentucky, Evening Attire seldom raced outside New York. He won at least one graded stakes race win over all three New York Racing Association dirt tracks. At Aqueduct, he was a seven-time stakes winner.

- 2001: 1st Queens County Handicap Grade III and Discovery Handicap (GIII)
- 2002: 1st Jockey Club Gold Cup (earning a 92 Speed Figure) (GI), Saratoga Breeders Cup Handicup (GII), Aqueduct Handicap (GIII), Red Smith Handicap (GII), and 2nd in Massachusetts Handicap (GII)
- 2003: 2nd in Queens County Handicap (GIII), Clark Handicap (GII), 3rd in the Jockey Club Gold Cup (GI) and Whitney Handicap (GI)
- 2004: 1st Saratoga Breeders' Cup Handicap (beating Funny Cide and Bowman's Band with a 90 Equibase Speed Figure) (GII), 2nd Knickerbocker Handicap (GII), Excelsior Breeders' Cup Handicap (GIII), Queens County Handicap (GIII), Ben Ali Stakes (GIII), Aqueduct Handicap (GIII), and John B. Campbell Handicap.
- 2005: 1st Stuyvesant Handicap (GIII)
- 2006: 2nd Aqueduct Handicap (GIII), 3rd Stymie Handicap.
- 2007: 1st Queens County Handicap (for the second time). 1st The Stymie Handicap, 3rd the Stuyvesant Handicap.
- 2008: 1st in the Greenwood Cup Stakes at Philadelphia Park Racetrack, setting a new track record for a mile and a half. 2nd in the Aqueduct Handicap. 2nd in the Fit to Fight Stakes. 2nd in the Grade II Brooklyn Handicap.

Quoted from The Daily Racing Form: "From June 2002 to November 2003, Evening Attire ran in 11 Grade 1 and Grade 2 races. In that span he ran against such stars as 2003's Horse of the Year Mineshaft, dual classic winner Funny Cide, and Medaglia d'Oro."

== Retirement ==
On September 28, 2008, his owners and trainer announced that Evening Attire would retire due to a suspensory injury.

His trainer, Tommy Kelly, said, "He was one of a kind. He had to be castrated early on because he couldn’t break from the gate. Still to this day, he didn’t break like any other racehorse. But at the final end when it counted, from the quarter pole to the wire, he always put in his run. I’ve never seen him back down once. He might have finished second, third, fourth, or fifth, but he was already running at the end, where the best part of a racehorse manifests itself. We’re all going to miss him."

On October 25, 2008, Evening Attire was brought to Belmont Park one last time. He was walked around the paddock, and a celebration was held in the Belmont Park winner's circle.

His next stop was Akindale Farm in Pawling, New York. Akindale is a farm dedicated to the rescue, rehab, and retraining of retired thoroughbred racehorses. Evening Attire died on January 21, 2019.

== Honors ==
Aqueduct Race Track renamed its Aqueduct Handicap as the Evening Attire Stakes in his honor. The first Evening Attire took place on January 17, 2009.
