= Blessbull =

American-bred Thoroughbred racehorse

- Sire: Bless Me
- Grandsire: Sickle
- Dam: Edabull
- Damsire: Bull Dog
- Sex: Gelding
- Foaled: 1951
- Country: United States
- Color: Bay
- Breeder: Paragon Stable
- Owner: 1) Maurice Simms; 2) Travis M. Kerr (11/1956)
- Trainer: George R. Handy; Herbert E. Lewis (1955)
- Record: 60: 18-11-4
- Earnings: US$141,950

Major wins
- Constitution Handicap (1954); Hialeah Inaugural Handicap (1955); Palm Beach Handicap (1955); Fresh Meadows Handicap (1956); Queens County Handicap (1956)
- Last updated on January 22, 2011

Blessbull (1951 -) was a Thoroughbred race horse, the son of Bless Me by Edabull. He was owned by Maurice Sims of Brockton, Massachusetts and raced out of Bull Dog Stables. On September 6, 1956 Blessbull tied the course record for one mile in the feature race at Belmont Park. In 60 career starts Blessbull had 18 wins, places, and shows and total earnings of $141,950.

== 1954 - 1956 stats and milestones ==
Blessbull set three new track records and in another race equaled three others.

- May 30, 1954: NTR, Suffolk Downs, 1:35 2/5, 1 mile on dirt, Constitution Handicap.
- January 17, 1955: NTR, Hialeah Park, 1:09 2/5, 6 furlongs on dirt, Inaugural Handicap.
- September 6, 1956: ETR, Belmont Park, 1:34 2/5, 1 mile on dirt, Fresh Meadows Classified Handicap.
- October 20, 1956: NTR, Jamaica, 1:42 flat, 1 1/16 miles on dirt, Queens County Handicap.

In winning the Fresh Meadows Classified Handicap, Blessbull covered the distance in 1:34 4/5. That winning time that Blessbull not only equaled the 14-year-old Belmont Park record for one mile (eight furlongs) set by the great Count Fleet, but also in that race Blessbull's fractional time of 1:09 4/5 for six furlongs and then his next clocking of 1:22 flat at the seven furlong point equaled the track record for both distances.

Blessbull won the $21,700 Inaugural Handicap at Hialeah Park Race Track on January 17, 1955. Coming off a second-place run at Tropical Park in Miami, Florida, the thoroughbred was ridden by Jack Skelly. The victory was worth $16,125 and his payoff was $25.20 for $2.

Under the guidance of jockey Willie Lester, the thoroughbred achieved victory in the October 20, 1956 Jamaica, New York $29,350 Queens County Handicap. He took 1:42 to place first over the mile and 1/16 track, to establish a track record. In thirteen 1956 starts Blessbull won $28,425.
