= Jamaica Race Course =

Horse racing course/ track in Queens, New York

Coordinates: 40°40′40″N 73°46′31″W

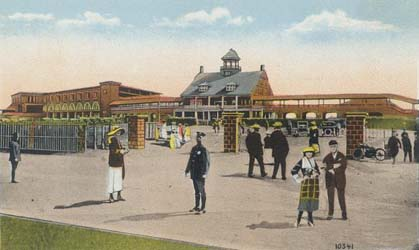
- Jamaica Race Course, c.1907
- Interactive map of Jamaica Race Course
- Location: Jamaica, Queens, New York City, New York; United States
- Owned by: Metropolitan Jockey Club
- Date opened: April 1903 (123 years ago)
- Date closed: August 1959 (67 years ago)
- Course type: Flat
- Notable races: Bed O' Roses Handicap; Continental Handicap; Daingerfield Handicap; Excelsior Handicap; Frizette Stakes; Jamaica Handicap; Long Beach Handicap; Paumonok Handicap; Pierrepont Handicap; Prioress Stakes; Remsen Handicap; Sheepshead Bay Handicap; Southampton Handicap; Wood Memorial Stakes

Jamaica Race Course, also called the Jamaica Racetrack, was a thoroughbred horse racing facility operated by the Metropolitan Jockey Club in Jamaica, Queens, New York City, United States.

== History ==
The 1-mile (1.6 km) track opened on April 27, 1903, a day which featured the inaugural running of the Excelsior Handicap. Eugene D. Wood, one of the founders and largest stockholder, served as its first president. Upon Wood's death in April 1924, Dr. Edward P. Kilroe was appointed president to replace him. The Wood Memorial Stakes is named in Eugene Wood's honor.

Legendary Hall of Fame horse trainer Sunny Jim Fitzsimmons was the first to train at Jamaica Race Course and Native Dancer made a winning debut here on April 19, 1952. The facility's attendance record of 64,679 was set on Memorial Day, 1945. It was home to ongoing races such as the Prioress Stakes, Frizette Stakes, Paumonok Handicap, Excelsior Handicap, Wood Memorial Stakes, Remsen Handicap, Bed O' Roses Handicap, and the Jamaica Handicap.

In 1955, the Greater New York Association took over management of Jamaica Race Course along with Aqueduct Racetrack, Belmont Park, and Saratoga Race Course and decided to undertake renovations to Aqueduct in South Ozone Park, the other track in the Greater Jamaica area. Jamaica took on the Big A dates during Aqueduct's four year renovation, after which it would be sold for redevelopment as a housing project. With Aqueduct slated to reopen in the fall of 1959, Jamaica ceased operations on August 1 and was torn down the following year. Today Rochdale Village a middle income cooperative occupies the former site of the Jamaica Race Course.

The racetrack was served by the adjacent Locust Manor station where the Long Island Rail Road runs

== Gallery ==
Jamaica Racecourse 1903

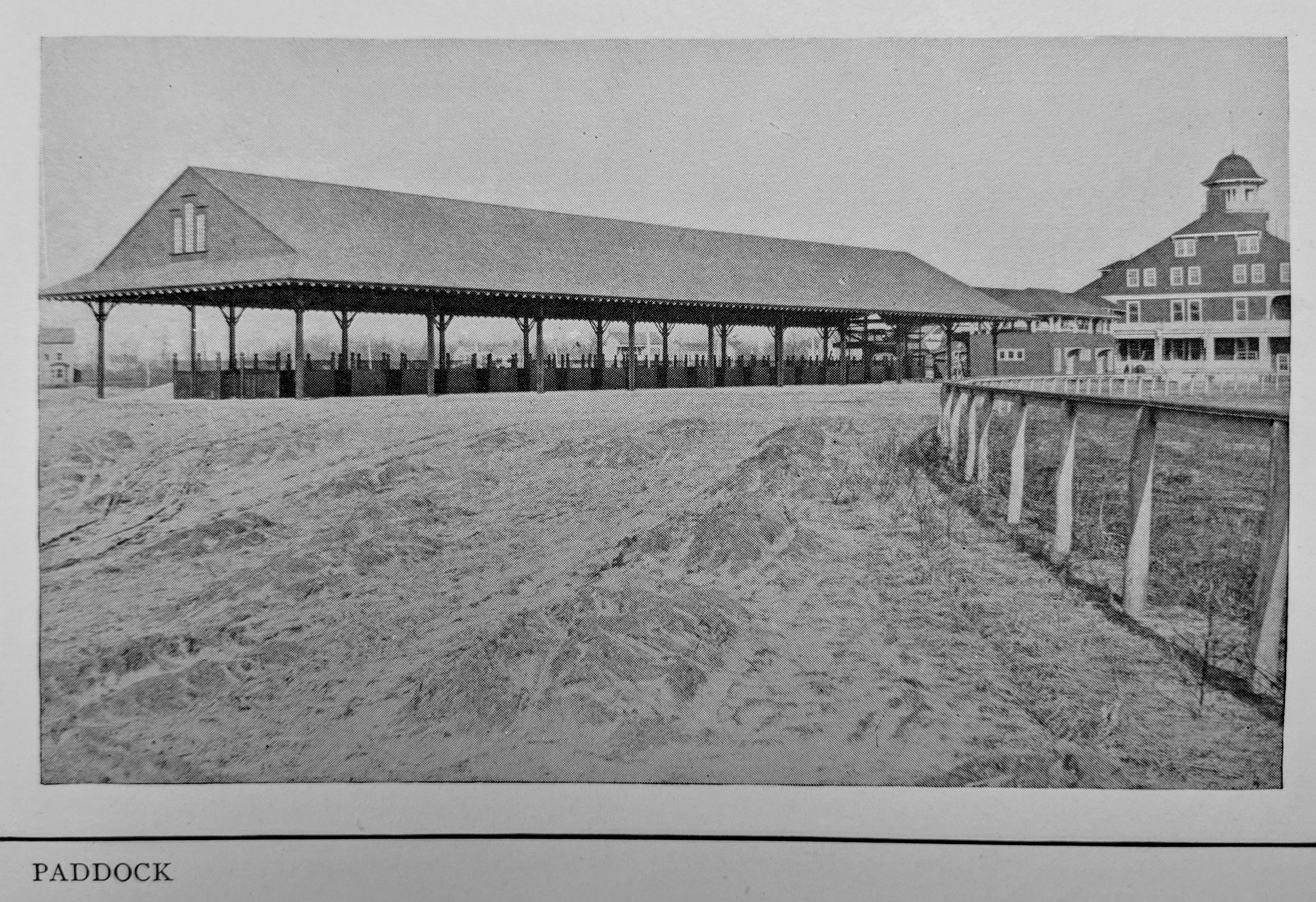

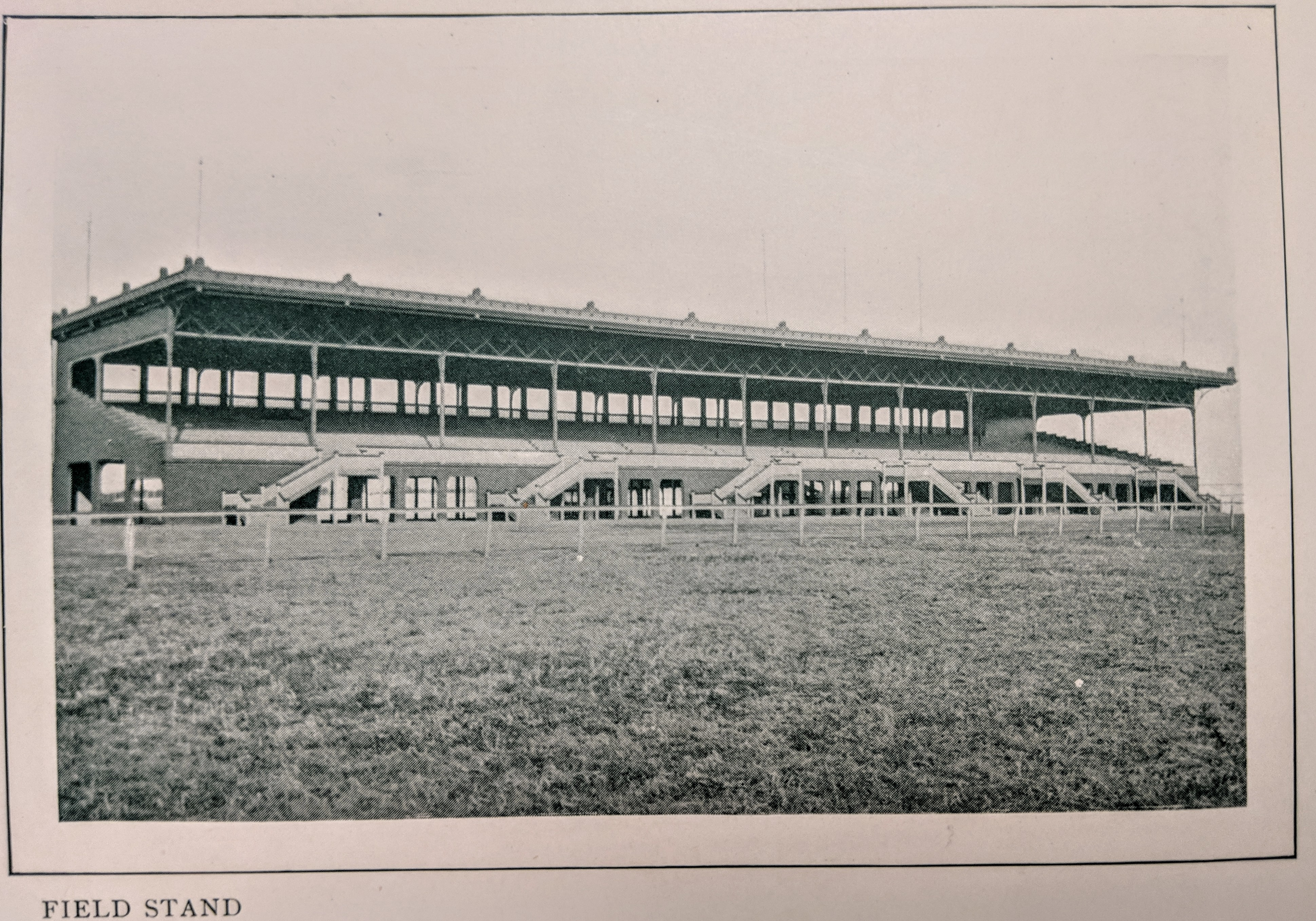
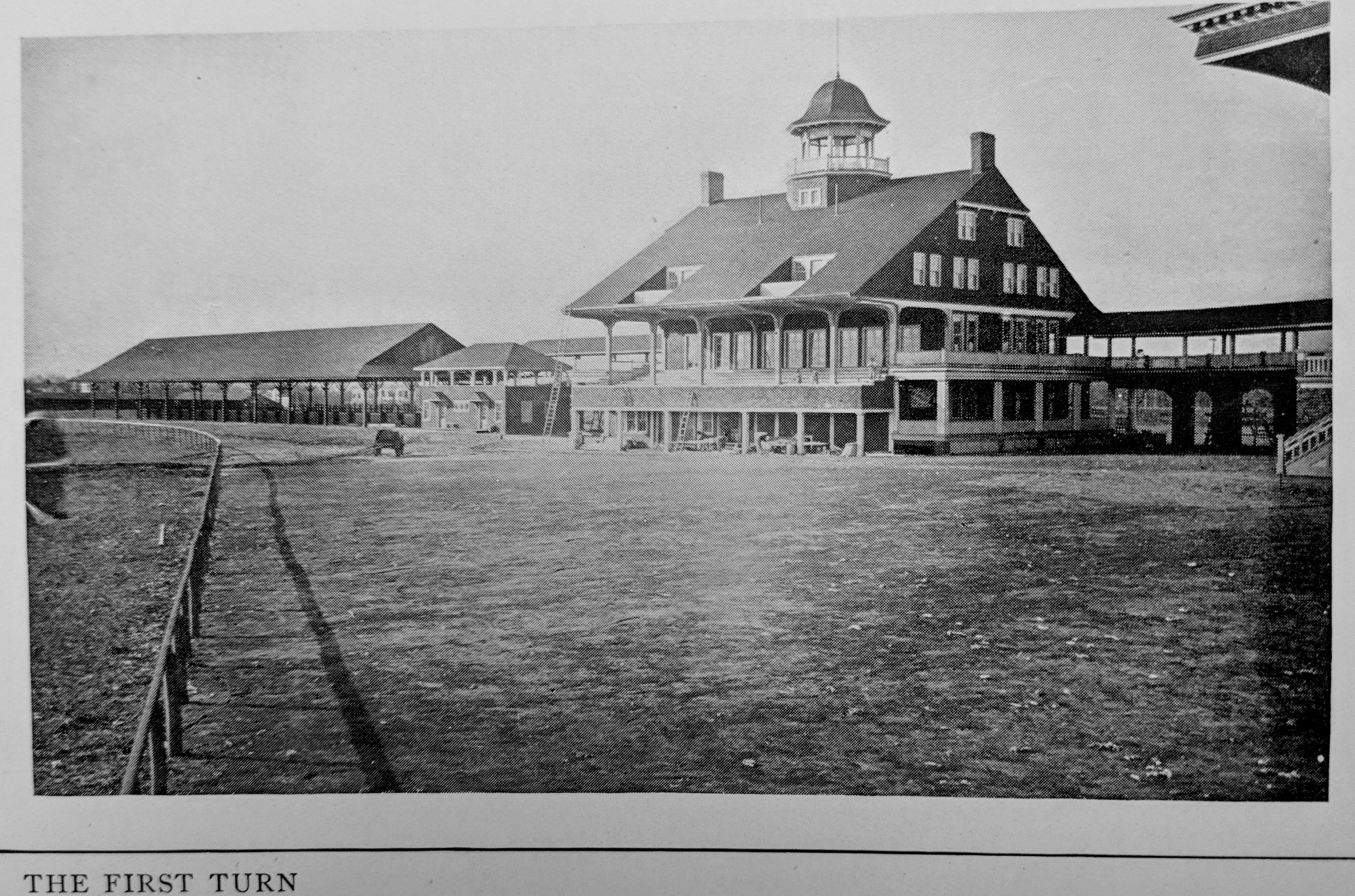

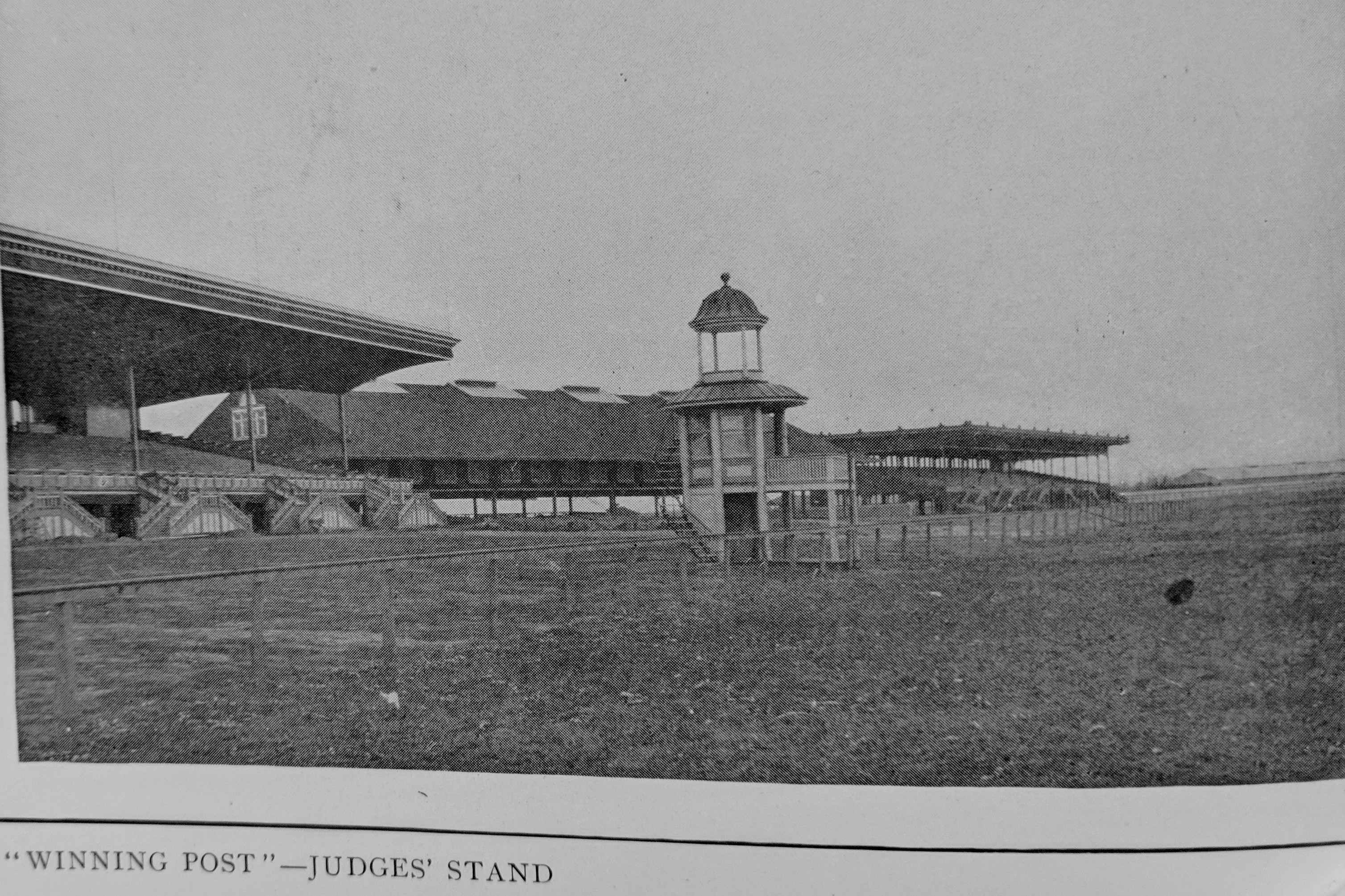
