= Lavelle Ensor =

American jockey

Personal information
- Born: April 27, 1900 Baltimore, Maryland, United States
- Died: November 13, 1947 (aged 47) New York City, New York, United States
- Resting place: Greenridge Cemetery, Saratoga Springs, New York
- Occupation: Jockey

Horse racing career
- Sport: Horse racing
- Career wins: 411

Major racing wins
- Coaching Club American Oaks (1918, 1919); Fleetwing Handicap (1918); Potomac Handicap (1918); Saratoga Special Stakes (1918); Fashion Stakes (1919); Juvenile Stakes (1919, 1922); Suburban Handicap (1919); Travers Stakes (1919); Bashford Manor Stakes (1920); Champagne Stakes (1920); Brooklyn Handicap (1920); Pierrepont Handicap (1920); Pimlico Cup Handicap (1920); Queens County Handicap (1920); Remsen Stakes (1920)

Honours
- United States Racing Hall of Fame (1962)

Significant horses
- Lucullite, Grey Lag, Exterminator

Emory Lavelle "Buddy" Ensor (April 27, 1900 – November 13, 1947) was an American Thoroughbred horse racing Hall of Fame jockey.

== Biography ==
A native of Maryland, Lavelle Ensor got his first professional riding job in 1918 with future Hall of Fame trainer H. Guy Bedwell. A naturally gifted talent, in 1918 he won a number of important races including the Coaching Club American Oaks, Saratoga Special Stakes and the Potomac Handicap when it was held at Laurel Park Racecourse. Within two years he had twice won five races on a single day and in 1920 he led all American jockeys with a 31% winning percentage. Ensor competed in the Kentucky Derby only twice, his best result a third in 1932 with Liz Whitney's colt, Stepenfetchit.

Lavelle Ensor's career was plagued by alcohol abuse and his misconduct eventually led to his suspension by The Jockey Club. In the early 1930s he returned to racing for a few years then came back to the track again in 1942. He retired permanently in 1945 with a career 21.1 winning percentage and in 1962 he was inducted posthumously in the National Museum of Racing and Hall of Fame.

Lavelle Ensor was married to Daisy Bennett (1902–1976) and they made their home in Saratoga Springs, New York. They are buried together in Saratoga Springs's Greenridge Cemetery.
