= Harry Ford Sinclair =

American businessman and oilman (1876–1956)

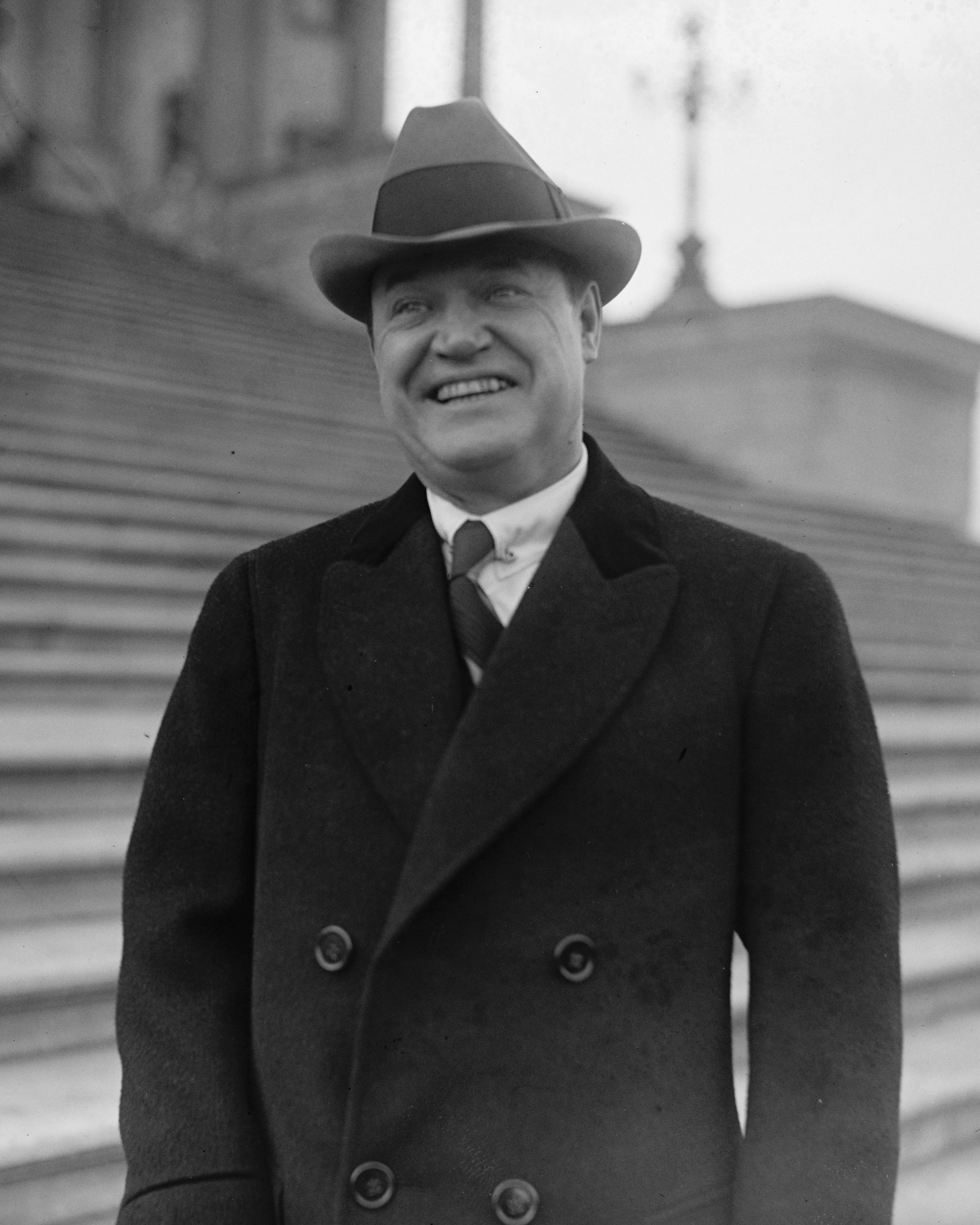
- Sinclair in 1923
- Born: July 6, 1876; Benwood, West Virginia, U.S.
- Died: November 10, 1956 (aged 80); Pasadena, California, U.S.
- Resting place: Calvary Cemetery
- Occupations: Businessman; oilman
- Years active: 1901–1949
- Known for: Founder of Sinclair Oil
- Spouse: Elizabeth Farrell (m. 1904)

Harry Ford Sinclair (July 6, 1876 – November 10, 1956) was an American industrialist, and the founder of Sinclair Oil. He was implicated in the 1920s Teapot Dome scandal, and served six months in prison for contempt of Congress. Although this harmed his reputation, he returned to his former life and enjoyed its prosperity until his death.

Sinclair was an avid owner of sports properties, one of the principal financial backers of baseball's Federal League and a force in U.S. thoroughbred racing. Horses from his stable won the Kentucky Derby and three Belmont Stakes.

== Early life ==
Harry Sinclair was born in Benwood, West Virginia, now a suburb of the city of Wheeling. Sinclair grew up in Independence, Kansas. The son of a pharmacist, after finishing high school, he entered the pharmacy department of the University of Kansas, at Lawrence. He was working as a pharmacist in 1901 when the business failed. He then began selling lumber for derricks in the oil fields of southeastern Kansas. On the side, he started speculating in oil leases. The opportunity in the rapidly expanding oil industry saw him become a lease broker and acquire an interest in the White Oil Company. In 1904, Sinclair married Elizabeth Farrell of Independence, Kansas. By the time he was thirty, he had become a millionaire.

== Oil business ==
In 1910, four businessmen: Eugene Frank Blaise, Charles J. Wrightsman, William Connelly, and Harry F. Sinclair bought the failed Farmers National Bank in Tulsa. They created a new entity, Exchange National Bank, and named Sinclair as president. This bank, later renamed as the National Bank of Tulsa, was a forerunner of the present Bank of Oklahoma.

On May 1, 1916, the highly successful Sinclair formed Sinclair Oil from the assets of eleven small petroleum companies. In the same year, he bought the Cudahy Refining Company of Chicago, owner of several oil pipelines and refineries. By the end of the 1920s, Sinclair Oil refineries had a production capacity of 80,000 barrels a day and had built almost 900 miles (1,400 km) of oil pipelines. Operations were expanded in various areas including a 12,000-acre (49 km^{2}) coal mining property. The company was ranked as the seventh largest oil company in the United States and the largest in the Midwest. Harry Sinclair's business acumen made him an important member of the local business community and he helped organize the State Bank of Commerce, which later was acquired by the First National Bank of Independence, of which Sinclair served on the board of directors.

His brother, Earle W. Sinclair, served as president of Sinclair Refining Company until his death at age 70 of heart disease on September 21, 1944.

== Organized sports ==
Sinclair was one of the main financiers of baseball's Federal League. He was the principal owner of that league's Indianapolis franchise. Following the 1914 season, he purchased the remainder of the team and moved them to Newark, New Jersey, where they became the Newark Peppers. After the season, the Federal League cut a deal with the other two baseball leagues. Sinclair reportedly made $2 million on his investment. Sinclair offered Helene Hathaway Britton $200,000 for the St. Louis Cardinals in 1916 ($5,917,431 in current dollar terms), but she declined.

Sinclair invested a substantial amount of money in thoroughbred race horses, acquiring the prestigious Rancocas Stable in Jobstown in southwest New Jersey from the estate of Pierre Lorillard IV. One of the most successful stables in the late 19th century, the farm continues to operate today as the Helis Stock Farm. The more than 2,000-acre (8.1 km2) farm includes a training barn with 1,100 windows enclosing a half-mile oblong indoor track. Sinclair again made it a major force in thoroughbred racing during the 1920s. Under trainer Sam Hildreth, Sinclair's stable won the Kentucky Derby and three Belmont Stakes. Such was the fame of Rancocas Stable that the Pennsylvania Railroad named baggage car #5858 in its honor. Two of the stable's colts, Grey Lag and Zev, are in the National Museum of Racing and Hall of Fame. (Note: Zev, then 3 years old, won the Kentucky Derby on May 19, 1923, beating out Martingale, which was owned by another Oklahoma oilman, J. F. Cosden. This race was seen by the largest crowd ever to visit the opening race at the Derby up to that time. It also occurred a few weeks after the Rancocas Stable burned to the ground, also destroying two valuable stallions, eleven colts and 29 brood mares.)

== Scandal ==
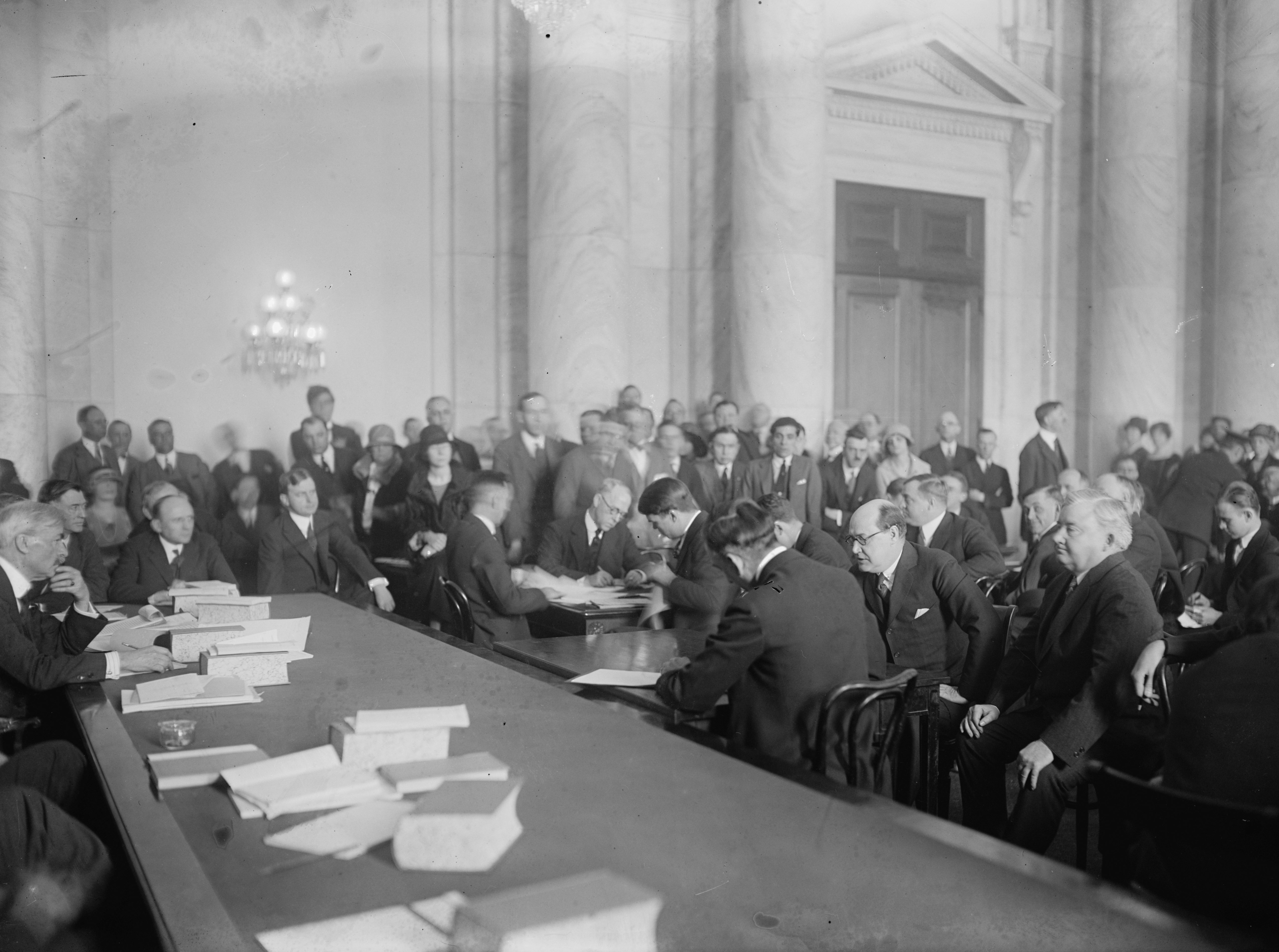
Sinclair and his attorneys on the state at the Teapot Dome hearing

Harry Sinclair's high-profile image as a reputable American business leader and sportsman came into question in April 1922 when The Wall Street Journal reported that, Albert B. Fall, the United States secretary of the interior, had granted an oil lease to Sinclair Oil without competitive bidding. The oil field lease was for government land in Wyoming that had been created as an emergency reserve for the United States Navy. What became known as the Teapot Dome scandal, ultimately led to a United States Senate establishing a Committee on Public Lands and Surveys to conduct hearings into the circumstances surrounding the government oil lease. The result was a finding of fraud and corruption which led to a number of civil lawsuits and criminal charges against Harry Sinclair and others. In 1927 the United States Supreme Court declared the Sinclair oil lease had been corruptly obtained and ordered it canceled.

Two weeks after Harry Sinclair's trial began in October 1927, it abruptly ended when the judge declared a mistrial following evidence presented by the government prosecutors showing that Sinclair had hired a detective agency to shadow each member of the jury. Sinclair was charged with contempt of court, the case eventually winding up before the Supreme Court who, on June 3, 1929 upheld Sinclair's conviction. He was fined and sentenced to six and a half months in prison, which he served as prisoner #10,520, at the District of Columbia jail.

While in prison, Sinclair was allowed to work as both pharmacist and physician's assistant, and it was while working within these capacities that he was allowed to be taken by car to attend to the prisoners assigned to work details at the city wharfs. Public attention and perceived favoritism prompted George S. Wilson, district director of Public Welfare, to order an end to these rides, but rumors of Sinclair's preferential treatment continued.

In October 1929, Secretary Fall was found guilty of bribery, fined $100,000 and sentenced to one year in prison, making him the first Cabinet member to go to prison for his actions in office.

== Later life ==
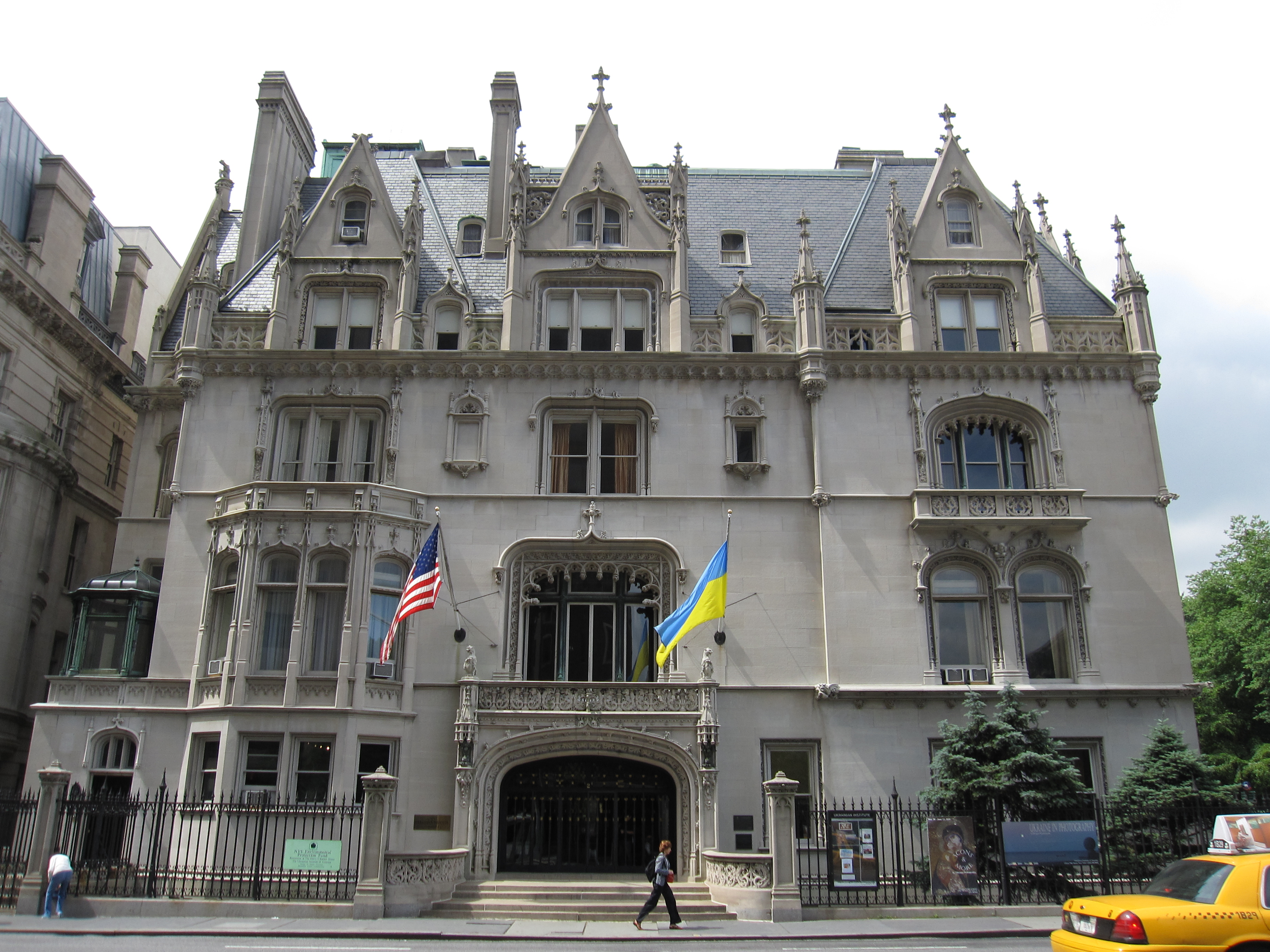
At one time, Sinclair owned this C. P. H. Gilbert designed mansion now known as the Harry F. Sinclair House, in New York City

After serving his short prison term Sinclair returned to his successful business. He had owned a luxurious French Renaissance-style château on the southeast corner of Fifth Avenue and 79th Street in New York City. His reputation destroyed there, Sinclair sold the property in 1930. Located in the same area as several major museums, it was eventually acquired by the Ukrainian Institute of America and is now open to the public.

Harry Ford Sinclair retired as president of Sinclair Oil and Gas Company in January 1949. He died a wealthy man in Pasadena, California in 1956, at age 80, and was interred in the Roman Catholic Calvary Cemetery, East Los Angeles.
