= Grey Lag =

American-bred Thoroughbred racehorse

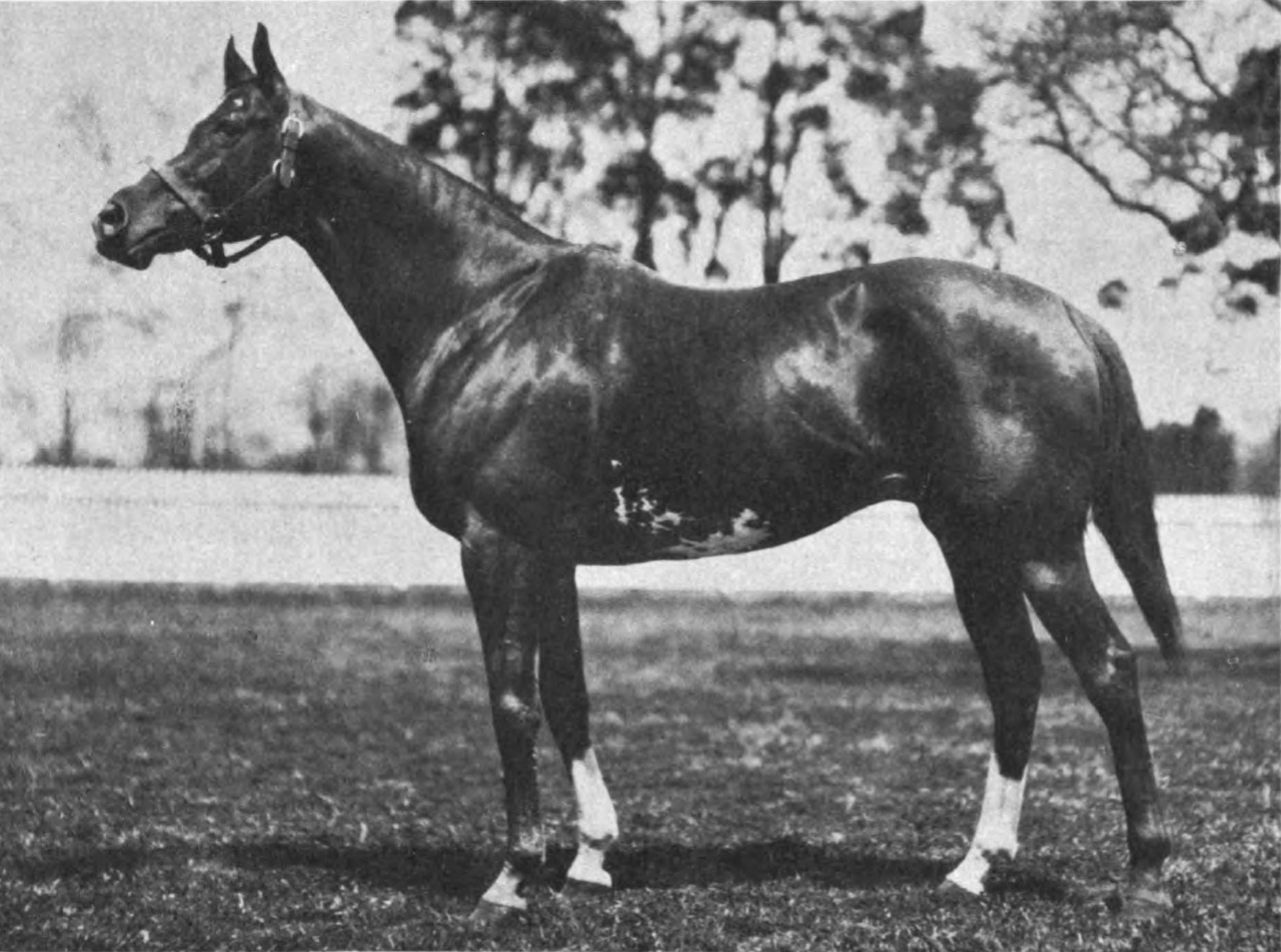
- Grey Lag
- Sire: Star Shoot
- Grandsire: Isinglass
- Dam: Miss Minnie
- Damsire: Meddler
- Sex: Stallion
- Foaled: 1918
- Country: United States
- Colour: Chestnut
- Breeder: John E. Madden
- Owner: Max Hirsch; Rancocas Stable
- Trainer: Max Hirsch; Sam Hildreth
- Record: 47: 25-9-3
- Earnings: $136,375

Major wins
- Champagne Stakes (1920); Remsen Stakes (1920); Autumn Days Stakes (1920); Islip Handicap (1920); Belmont Stakes (1921); Dwyer Stakes (1921); Empire City Derby (1921); Knickerbocker Handicap (1921); Devonshire International Handicap (1921); Mount Kisco Stakes (1921); Brooklyn Handicap (1921); Empire City Handicap (1922); Queens County Handicap (1922); Saratoga Handicap (1922); Excelsior Handicap (1923); Metropolitan Handicap (1923)

Awards
- Unofficial U.S. Champion Three-Year-Old Colt (1921); Unofficial United States Horse of the Year (1921)

Honours
- United States' Racing Hall of Fame (1957) #54 - Top 100 U.S. Racehorses of the 20th Century; Grey Lag Handicap at Aqueduct Racetrack
- Last updated on October 14, 2006

Grey Lag (1918–1942) was a Thoroughbred race horse born in Kentucky and bred by John E. Madden. At his Hamburg Place near Lexington, Kentucky, Madden had a good stallion called Star Shoot which he bred to all of his mares. Out of a failed racemare called Miss Minnie who had produced no previous winners, he got Grey Lag. In his later days, Madden said Grey Lag was the best horse he ever bred.

== Color ==
Sired by Star Shoot (going back to Stockwell and Beeswing, out of Miss Minnie (by Meddler), Grey Lag was not a grey. He was a chestnut with a few small grey patches on his belly, hidden when he was saddled. With three white feet and a large white blaze, Grey Lag displayed Sabino markings.

== Racing career ==
=== 1920: two-year-old season ===
Grey Lag (whose name came from a type of wild European goose) stood 16 and a half hands tall when he was sold as a yearling to Hall of Fame trainer Max Hirsch. He remained a maiden until his fifth start. Hirsch raced him until he won the Champagne Stakes for two-year-olds, then sold him to Harry F. Sinclair of Sinclair Oil (famous for his close connection to the 29th President of the United States, Warren G. Harding, and involved in the infamous Teapot Dome scandal). Sinclair took enormous pleasure in his recently purchased no-expense-spared Rancocas Stable in New Jersey while buying every horse that took his fancy. The trainer, Hall of Famer Sam Hildreth, not as well-heeled as Sinclair nor as happy about the horse—a superstitious man, he hated the grey patches—nevertheless remained in the partnership. They paid $60,000 for the two-year-old once he won the Champagne. (Hirsch added $20,000 to his price because Hildreth had earlier snubbed Grey Lag and his grey patch.)

Grey Lag raced the remainder of his two-year-old season in Hildreth's name, but after that he was a Rancocas Stable entry every time. He wasn't an outstanding youngster, even with his wins in the Champagne, the Remsen Stakes, the Autumn Days Stakes, and the Islip Handicap, but at three he came into his own.

=== 1921: three-year-old season ===
In 1921, Grey Lag won the Belmont Stakes with Earl Sande up (this was the year after Man o' War's win and two years after Sir Barton's), the Dwyer Stakes, the Empire Derby, the Knickerbocker Handicap, the Devonshire International Handicap, and the Mount Kisco Stakes. He placed in the Lawrence Realization Stakes, Brooklyn Handicap, Queens County Handicap, Empire City Handicap, Saratoga Handicap, Kings County Handicap, Excelsior Handicap, Metropolitan Handicap, Suburban Handicap, and Jockey Club Gold Cup. He came home third in the Withers Stakes.

At three, he matched the American record for 1 and 1/8 mile, and beginning with the Belmont, he won eight straight stakes races, six of them in July. During this streak, he beat Exterminator as well as other older horses and set a Canadian record. (Later he won the Brooklyn, and then in a further running, Exterminator reversed the form to beat Grey Lag.)

Grey Lag was unofficially named Champion Three Year Old Colt of 1921 and Horse of the Year.

Grey Lag winning the 1921 Brooklyn Handicap

=== Later career ===
Grey Lag suffered from bad feet. After losing a few races at ages 4 and 5, he retired to stud. Like several other notable horses before and after him (Black Gold, for example), he had fertility problems at stud and so was returned to the track at 9 and 10 years of age. He won his two starts at 9 and one of his starts at 10, then was again retired. This time he was given to a veterinarian as a riding horse, but the vet died soon afterwards, and Grey Lag was sold at the estate auction.

Grey Lag changed ownership quite a few times until he ended up competing in $1,000 claiming races in Canada. He seldom won one, and he wasn't claimed. The last purse money ever recorded for a son of Star Shoot was the $40 Grey Lag earned in one of those races—he finished third. Harry F. Sinclair, who'd gone to prison for his role in the Teapot Dome oilfield scandal, was not anxious for more bad publicity. There was an outcry, and Sinclair bought the horse back.

== Retirement ==
At 13, Grey Lag found a home at Rancocas. When Sinclair sold the farm, as well as his mansion in New York City, he was still a wealthy man, and Grey Lag remained protected. He died 11 years later in 1942. He was inducted into the Hall of Fame in 1957.

In The Blood-Horse magazine ranking of the top 100 U.S. thoroughbred champions of the 20th century, Grey Lag is #54.
