= David Cohen (jockey) =

American jockey (born 1984)

Personal information
- Born: October 29, 1984 (age 41) California
- Occupation: Jockey
- Weight: 115
- Children: 2

Horse racing career
- Sport: Horse racing
- Career winnings: $65 million (as of March 20, 2024)
- Career wins: 1,644 (as of March 20, 2024)

Honors
- 2018 Comeback Jockey of the Year; 2019 Oaklawn Champion Jockey; Southern California Jewish Sports Hall of Fame (inducted 2022)

David Cohen (born October 29, 1984) is an American jockey. He won the 2018 Comeback Jockey of the Year Award, and was the 2019 Oaklawn Racing Casino Resort Champion Jockey. In 2022, he was inducted into the Southern California Jewish Sports Hall of Fame. As of March 20, 2024, he had 1,644 career wins, and earnings of $65 million.

== Personal ==
Cohen is Jewish and was born and raised in California, where he had his bar mitzvah, lived in Arcadia, California, then in Las Vegas, Nevada, where he graduated from Bonanza High School, and his hometown is New York. His father, Morry Cohen, died of cancer. He had a fiancée, rider Maria Remedio (aka Maria Charles), and they have two children. In 2017 he was living in Louisville, Kentucky, with his fiancée, Ashley. He is 5 feet 6 inches tall, and weighs 115 pounds.

== Career ==
=== Early career ===
Cohen was introduced to racing by his father, an owner and breeder in Southern California. He began riding professionally in 2004, at 19 years of age. On December 26, 2005, he won his first Grade 1 race on the opening-day program at Santa Anita Park.

In 2009, Cohen ranked 6th nationally in wins (288), and 24th in purse earnings ($7,357,326), competing in New York and the Mid-Atlantic. He had a 24% win percentage, and a 55% win-place-show percentage.

In 2010, he had purse earnings of $6,982,006, 28th-highest in the nation. On October 13, 2011, at 26 years of age he rode his 1,000th career winner. In 2012 he won the $1 million Travers Stakes (G1) for 3-year-olds at Saratoga Race Course aboard Golden Ticket. He then won riding titles at Delaware Park Racetrack and Parx Racing.

On February 1, 2014, he suffered a leg fracture. He was kicked by a horse at Aqueduct Racetrack which broke his lower right leg's tibia and fibula, and underwent major surgery in which doctors inserted a plate and six screws in his leg.

=== Recent career ===
Cohen returned to racing on November 30, 2017, at Fair Grounds Race Course, following an absence of over three years during which time he rehabbed.

In 2018 Cohen ranked 23rd nationally in purse earnings ($6,775,883). He was named 2018 Comeback Jockey of the Year by JockeyTalk360.com after amassing 114 victories.

In 2019 Cohen won 75 races at Oaklawn Racing Casino Resort in Arkansas to end Ricardo Santana Jr.’s six-year reign as leading rider. Cohen ranked second to Santana in purse earnings in 2019 at Oaklawn ($2,580,456). Among his highlights in 2020 were riding Selflessly to victory in the Lake George Stakes (G3) at Saratoga, and winning the Kentucky Jockey Club Stakes (G2) aboard Keepmeinmind at Churchill Downs.

In 2021, at the Kentucky Derby he finished 7th aboard 50-1 shot Keepmeinmind. In 2022, he was inducted into the Southern California Jewish Sports Hall of Fame.

As of March 20, 2024, he had 1,644 career wins, and earnings of $65 million.
