= Sam Hildreth =

American horse trainer (1866–1929)

- Sam Hildreth, 1910

Personal information
- Born: May 16, 1866 Independence, Missouri, United States
- Died: September 24, 1929 (aged 63)
- Occupation: Trainer

Horse racing career
- Sport: Horse racing
- Career wins: Not found

Major racing wins
- Bowie Handicap (1909, 1911, 1915, 1920); Brooklyn Handicap (1909, 1910, 1916, 1920, 1921, 1923, 1924); Metropolitan Handicap (1909, 1915, 1921, 1922, 1923); Suburban Handicap (1909, 1915, 1916, 1923, 1924); Travers Stakes (1910, 1922); Jockey Club Gold Cup (1919, 1921, 1922) American Classic Race wins: Belmont Stakes (1899, 1909, 1916, 1917, 1921, 1923, 1924)

Racing awards
- United States Champion trainer by wins (1921, 1927); United States Champion trainer by earnings (1909, 1910, 1911, 1916, 1917; 1921, 1922, 1923, 1924); U.S. Leading Thoroughbred owner by earnings (1909, 1910, 1911)

Honors
- United States' Racing Hall of Fame (1955); Fair Grounds Racing Hall of Fame (1971)

Significant horses
- Jean Bereaud, Fitz Herbert, King James, Novelty, Dalmatian, Friar Rock, Hourless, Mad Hatter, Mahubah, Purchase, Grey Lag, Zev, Mad Play
- Updated on September 26, 2007

Samuel Clay Hildreth (May 16, 1866 – September 24, 1929) was an American Thoroughbred horse racing Hall of Fame trainer and owner.

== Biography ==
Born in Independence, Missouri, Sam Hildreth began his training career in 1887, competing at racetracks in the Midwestern United States with such horses as the good racemare Hurley Burley, the dam of Burgomaster. In 1898 he moved to New York City where thoroughbred racing was a leading sport offering the largest purses. He was first hired to train horses owned by wealthy businessman William Collins Whitney, but soon set out on his own, buying horses for himself and training for others. He won his first of seven Belmont Stakes in 1899 with the horse Jean Bereaud for owner Sydney Paget.

By the turn of the 20th century, Samuel Hildreth had expanded his New York operations and owned the largest racing stables at the Fair Grounds Race Course in New Orleans. That year, he appointed former outlaw Frank James as his betting commissioner at the track. Among the horses Hildreth owned was Fitz Herbert (b. 1906) who won the Brooklyn Handicap, Suburban Handicap, and the Jerome Handicap en route to being voted the Horse of the Year in 1909, and again in 1910. Another of his horses, King James, won other important races in 1909, including the Metropolitan Handicap, Sheepshead Bay Handicap, and the California Handicap, and went on to win the Brooklyn Handicap in 1910. In 1909, Hildreth also won his second Belmont Stakes with his own horse, Joe Maddon, and went on to capture the first of three consecutive leading owner and trainer honors in the United States.

The Hart–Agnew Law which banned parimutuel betting was passed by the New York Legislature and resulted in the closure of all New York racetracks between 1911 and 1912. Hildreth and numerous other racing stables went to race in Canada where he won the 1911 Windsor Hotel Cup Handicap at Blue Bonnets Raceway in Montreal. On November 2, 1911, The New York Times reported that Sam Hildreth and jockey Carroll Shilling had sailed to England aboard the RMS Mauretania with the intent of racing there for the stable of American owner, Charles Kohler. However, Kohler subsequently set up operations in France and in 1912 Sam Hildreth trained a stable of horses for him at Val-d'Oise, near Paris.

Sam Hildreth's stable trained for other prominent owners such as August Belmont Jr. for whom he won back-to-back Belmont Stakes in 1916 and 1917. He also met with great success training for Rancocas Stable owned by wealthy oil industrialist Harry F. Sinclair. For Sinclair he won three Belmont Stakes with Grey Lag in 1921, Zev in 1923 and Mad Play in 1924. In an era before the Triple Crown had any significance, Hildreth only entered a few horses in the Kentucky Derby because of the time restraints for the long journey to Kentucky. As such, David J. Leary is listed as the trainer of Zev for his win in the 1923 Kentucky Derby. Back in New York, in October of that year, Zev defeated Epsom Derby winner Papyrus, marking the first time a Kentucky Derby winner defeated an English Derby winner.

Twice Sam Hildreth won more races in a year than any other trainer in the United States and was the top money-earning trainer nine times, a record that stood for more than sixty years until broken by D. Wayne Lukas in 1992. Hildreth's seven Belmont Stakes victories ranks him second only to James G. Rowe Sr. and five times his horses were chosen American Horse of the Year, the highest honor in thoroughbred horse racing.

In 1925, Hildreth co-wrote an article with James R. Crowell titled "Down the Stretch" for The Saturday Evening Post. The two then collaborated on a history of American racing in a book titled "The Spell of the Turf" published in 1926 by J. B. Lippincott & Co. of Philadelphia. In this book, he named Purchase as one of the greatest horses he ever trained.

After forty-three years as a horse trainer, Sam Hildreth died at a hospital in Manhattan, New York following an unsuccessful operation for an intestinal disorder. He was buried in Greenridge Cemetery, Saratoga Springs, New York.

In 1955, Sam Hildreth was posthumously inducted into the newly formed National Museum of Racing and Hall of Fame.
