= Rancocas Farm =

American horse racing stud farm and racing stable

Coordinates: 40°02′34.0″N 74°40′59.5″W

Rancocas Farm & Racing Stable
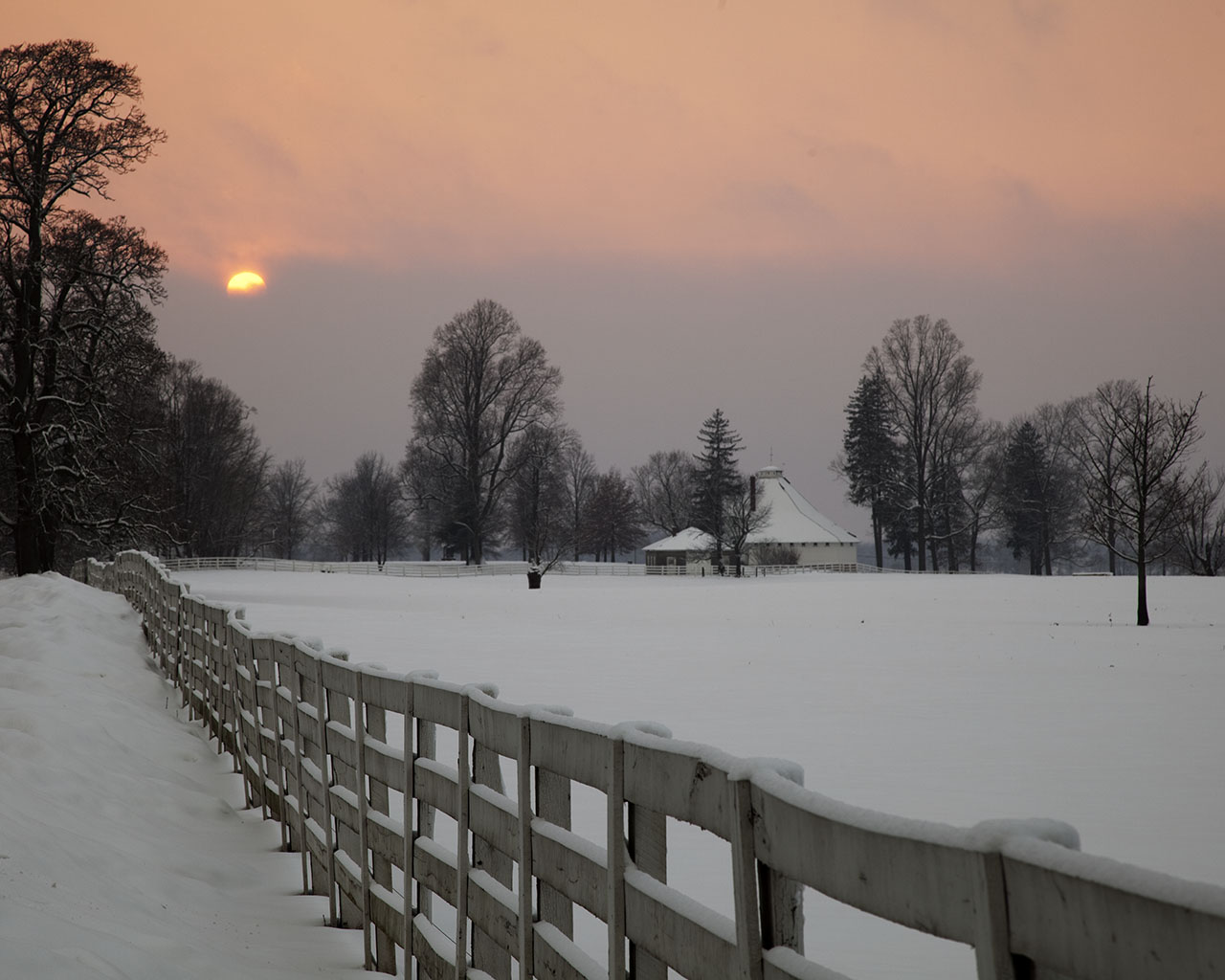
- caption =Helis Stock Farm, January 2011 Helis Stock Farm, January 2011
- Type: Horse breeding/Racing stable
- Industry: Thoroughbred horse racing
- Founded: c. 1873
- Headquarters: Jobstown, New Jersey, U.S.
- Key people: Owners: Pierre Lorillard IV; Lily A. Livingston; Harry F. Sinclair; William G. Helis, Sr.

Rancocas Farm was an American thoroughbred horse racing stud farm and racing stable located on Monmouth Road (County Road 537) in the Jobstown section of Springfield Township, Burlington County, New Jersey.

== Pierre Lorillard IV ==
The farm was founded in the 1870s by the wealthy tobacco manufacturer Pierre Lorillard IV (1833–1901) who had a home in the town of Rancocas, now a part of Westampton Township, New Jersey. Lorillard built his stable into one of the premier thoroughbred breeding and training operations in the United States. Lorillard bred Parole, one of the three greatest runners of the 1870s. In 1881, Lorillard's horse Iroquois became the first American-owned and -bred horse to win a European classic race. Ridden by the champion English jockey, Fred Archer, Iroquois won The Derby then went on to also capture the St. Leger Stakes.

== Lily A. Livingston ==
On the death of Pierre Lorillard, Rancocas Stable was inherited by Sarah "Lily" Barnes-Allien-Livingston. She sold it in 1919 to Kansas oil industrialist Harry F. Sinclair and moved to Canada where she set up her own breeding and racing operation that would see her inducted into the Canadian Horse Racing Hall of Fame in 2011.

== Harry Ford Sinclair ==
Harry Sinclair would invest considerable funds to continue the Rancocas breeding and racing success, making it one of the dominant racing stables in the United States during the 1920s. For Sinclair, trainer Sam Hildreth brought the stable victories in the Kentucky Derby and in three Belmont Stakes. Between 1923 and 1929 the stable had six horses compete in the Preakness Stakes but never managed a win. Two of the stable's colts, Grey Lag and Zev, are in the National Museum of Racing and Hall of Fame. After their racing careers, both Purchase and Lucullite stood there. Such was the fame of Rancocas Stable that the Pennsylvania Railroad named baggage car #5858 in its honor.

Among the jockeys who rode for Rancocas Stable were Hall of Famers Earl Sande and Laverne Fator. Sinclair's Rancocas Stable set the record as top money winner in a single season in 1923 that stood until 1941 when it was broken by Calumet Farm.

Personal problems culminating in a prison term for his part in what became known in American history as the Teapot Dome scandal (Sinclair sold US oil reserves to private interests for his own aggrandizement), forced Harry Sinclair to sell his horses and the farm.

== William Helis ==
In 1943, William Helis purchased the 1,300-acre (5.3 km^{2}) farm and in 1946 acquired adjoining acreage to bring it up to 2,040 acres (8.3 km^{2}). On his death in 1950, management of the property was taken over by his son, William Jr. who was also involved in racing.

The site continues to operate as the Helis Stock Farm, and is run by Linda and Ed Lovenduski. The more than 2,000-acre (8.1 km^{2}) farm includes a number of original Rancocas Stable-era buildings that can be seen from the roadside; including a training barn with 1,100 windows enclosing a half-mile oblong indoor track.
