= 1919 Preakness Stakes =

44th running of the Preakness Stakes

44th Preakness Stakes
- Preakness Stakes
- Location: Pimlico Race Course, Baltimore, Maryland, United States
- Date: May 14, 1919
- Winning horse: Sir Barton
- Winning time: 1:53.00
- Jockey: Johnny Loftus
- Trainer: H. Guy Bedwell
- Owner: J. K. L. Ross
- Conditions: Fast
- Surface: Dirt

The 1919 Preakness Stakes was the 44th running of the $50,000 added Preakness Stakes, a horse race for three-year-old Thoroughbreds. The event took place on May 14, 1919, and was run four days after the Kentucky Derby. Ridden by Johnny Loftus, the Derby winner Sir Barton easily won the mile and an eighth race by four lengths over runner-up Eternal. The race was run on a track rated fast in a final time of 1:53 flat.

Sir Barton's Preakness would become what is known as the second leg of the U.S. Triple Crown series.

== Payout ==
The 44th Preakness Stakes Payout Schedule

Program Number	Horse Name	Win	Place	Show
3	Sir Barton	$4.80	$3.20	$2.70
1	Eternal	-	$7.50	$6.00
2	Sweep On			$5.00

== The full chart ==
Daily Racing Form Chart

Finish Position	Margin (lengths)	Post Position	Horse name	Jockey	Trainer	Owner	Post Time Odds	Earnings
1st	0	8	Sir Barton	Johnny Loftus	H. Guy Bedwell	J. K. L. Ross	1.40-1	$24,500
2nd	4	2	Eternal	Andy Schuttinger	Kimball Patterson	James W. McClelland	9.20-1	$3,000
3rd	3	3	Sweep On	Linus McAtee	William H. Karrick	William R. Coe	15.55-1	$2,000
4th	11/2	9	King Plaudit	Lawrence Lyke	George M. Odom	Brookside Stable	53.25-1	$1,000
5th	11/2	4	Over There	Harold Myers	William H. Karrick	William R. Coe	15.55-1 †	
6th	NK	12	Routledge	Eddie Ambrose	Michael J. Daly	Walter M. Jeffords, Sr.	70.80-1	
7th	HD	1	Vulcanite	Roscoe Troxler	John Hogan	William F. Polson	39.45-1	
8th	11/2	6	Milkmaid	Earl Sande	H. Guy Bedwell	J. K. L. Ross	1.40-1 †	
9th	3	7	Drummond	Albert Johnson	Raleigh Colston Jr.	M. Shea	145.00-1	
10th	1/2	11	Yurucari	Ted Rice	James E. Fitzsimmons	Quincy Stable	125.40-1	
11th	15	5	Dunboyne	Lavelle Ensor	John H. McCormack	Philip A. Clark	4.20-1	
12th	Left at post	10	Vindex	Willie Knapp	James G. Rowe Sr.	Harry Payne Whitney	3.65-1	

- Winning Breeder: John E. Madden & Vivian A. Gooch; (KY)
- Times: 1/4 mile 0:23 2/5; 1/2 mile – 0:47 1/5; 3/4 mile – 1:13 0/0; mile – 1:39 1/5; 1 3/16 (final) – 1:59 0/0.
- Track condition: fast
- † - denotes entry
