= Joe McCahey =

American jockey

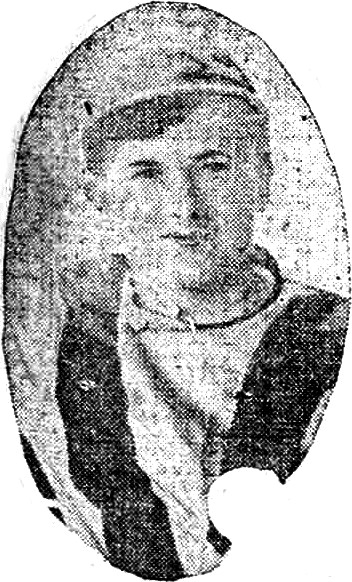

Personal information
- Born: May 11, 1888 Philadelphia, Pennsylvania
- Died: March 17, 1917 (aged 28) Asheville, North Carolina
- Resting place: Old Cathedral Cemetery, Cathedral Park, Philadelphia
- Occupation: Jockey

Horse racing career
- Sport: Horse racing
- Career wins: 837 (1909-1916)

Major racing wins
- Delaware Handicap (1908, 1909); Saratoga Handicap (1908); Zephyr Stakes (1908); Champagne Stakes (1909); Walden Stakes (1909); Bowie Handicap (1910); Invincible Handicap (1910); Test Handicap (1910); Grey Stakes (1911); Keene Memorial Stakes (1913, 1915); Aberdeen Stakes (1914); Astoria Stakes (1914, 1915); Blue Point Stakes (1914); Brooklyn Handicap (1914); Empire City Handicap (1914); Fall Highweight Handicap (1914); Garden City Handicap (1914); Hudson Stakes (1914); Saratoga Cup (1914); Troy Stakes (1914, 1915); Excelsior Handicap (1915); Great American Stakes (1915); Kentucky Stakes (1915)

Racing awards
- United States Champion Jockey by earnings (1914)

Significant horses
- Addie M., Buckhorn, Comely, Montfort, Ormesdale

Joseph M. McCahey (May 11, 1888 – March 13, 1917) was an American champion jockey in Thoroughbred horse racing who won a national riding title in 1914.

Joe McCahey began his career as a stableboy and jockey in training for an up-and-coming young trainer named Jim Fitzsimmons who loaned him to stable owner and trainer Tom Mannix to ride in Louisiana and Florida during the winter. When Mannix died in the fall of 1910 Fitzsimmons began giving McCahey more rides and loaning him to other top level trainers such as T. J. Healey.

In 1913 McCahey finished second in wins nationally behind Merritt Buxton and the following year when he led the nation in earnings he finished second in wins nationally behind John McTaggart. In 1915, health problems forced McCahey to reduce his number of mounts by more than 25% but still had an impressive win to start rate of 18%. A September 10, 1915 article in the New York Times referred to McCahey as "one of the foremost jockeys on the American turf" and someone "often referred to as the Hans Wagner of the turf".

Failing health forced McCahey to retire in 1916 after a limited number of mounts and in March 1917 he died at age 28 from tuberculosis. In their post-mortem review of his career, the Daily Racing Form wrote that throughout his career McCahey "was an honest, upright sportsman."
