= Hudson Stakes =

- Class: Discontinued stakes
- Location: Gravesend Race Track, Gravesend, New York (1887–1910); United States; Aqueduct Racetrack, South Ozone Park, Queens, New York, United States (1914–1932)
- Inaugurated: 1887
- Race type: Thoroughbred – flat racing

Race information
- Distance: 5 furlongs (5/8 mile)
- Surface: Dirt
- Track: left-handed
- Qualification: Two-year-olds

The Hudson Stakes was an American Thoroughbred horse race first run in 1887 at Gravesend Race Track in Gravesend, New York. A race for two-year-old horses of either sex, it was run on dirt over a distance of five furlongs.

The Hudson Stakes carries the name of the early 17th century explorer, Henry Hudson, for whom New York's Hudson River was named. An annual event, the it was last run at the Gravesend track in 1910, at a time when New York state racetrack owners were struggling to survive following the June 11, 1908 passage of the Hart–Agnew anti-betting legislation. Implemented by the Republican controlled New York Legislature under Governor Charles Evans Hughes. the law contained penalties that allowed for fines and up to a year in prison. Further restrictive legislation was passed by the New York Legislature in 1910 which deepened the financial crisis for track operators and led to a complete shutdown of racing across the state during 1911 and 1912. A February 21, 1913 ruling by the New York Supreme Court, Appellate Division saw horse racing return in 1913. However, it was too late for the Gravesend horse racing facility and it never reopened.

In 1914 the running of the Hudson Stakes was taken up by Aqueduct Racetrack in Queens, New York. It was won by Sea Shell under jockey Joe McCahey who would go on to win that year's national riding title with the most purse money won by any American jockey.

== Historical race notes ==
The 1918 edition of the Hudson Stakes saw the Aqueduct track record for five furlongs on dirt broken when High Time won in a time 58 2/5. High Time would have a very successful career at stud, becoming the Leading sire in North America in 1928 and the Leading broodmare sire in North America in 1936 and again in 1940.

The legendary Man o' War won the 1919 Hudson Stakes carrying at least 15 pounds more than any of his rivals. Although on a track rated as fast, he winning time of 1:01 3/5 was the slowest of any winner during the 19 years it was hosted by the Aqueduct track.

The Great Depression brought difficult times once again for Thoroughbred racing and it would lead to the final running of the Hudson Stakes taking place on June 18, 1932. The event was won by Jerome H. Louchheim's Sandy Bill in a time of 58 seconds, the fastest in the history of the race.

In 1978, Belmont Park revived usage of the Hudson name with the Hudson Handicap, a mile race for New York-bred horses age three and older. It has since been renamed the Hudson Stakes.

== Records ==
Speed record:

- 0:58 flat @ 5 furlongs: Sandy Bill (1932)

Most wins by a jockey:

- 3 – Linus McAtee (1923, 1926, 1930)
- 3 – Laverne Fator (1928, 1929, 1931)

Most wins by a trainer:

- 4 – Sam Hildreth (1898, 1917, 1928, 1929)

Most wins by an owner:

- 4 – Harry P. Whitney (1916, 1923, 1924, 1926)

== Winners ==
Year	Winner	Age	Jockey	Trainer	Owner	Dist. (Miles)	Time	Win $
1932	Sandy Bill	2	Francis Horn	Clarence Buxton	Jerome H. Louchheim	5 F	0:58.00	$4,625
1931	Makalu	2	Laverne Fator	Alex Gordon	Fair Stable	5 F	0:59.60	$6,075
1930	Sovietta	2	Linus McAtee	A. Jack Joyner	George D. Widener Jr.	5 F	1:00.00	$6,275
1929	Grattan	2	Laverne Fator	Sam Hildreth	Rancocas Stable	5 F	1:00.00	$7,300
1928	Mei Foo	2	Laverne Fator	Sam Hildreth	Rancocas Stable	5 F	1:01.00	$6,175
1927	Dice	2	Danny McAuliffe	James E. Fitzsimmons	Wheatley Stable	5 F	0:59.20	$5,700
1926	Witchmount	2	Linus McAtee	James G. Rowe Jr.	Harry P. Whitney	5 F	1:00.20	$5,150
1925	Sarmaticus	2	Frank Coltiletti	George M. Odom	Robert L. Gerry Sr.	5 F	1:00.00	$5,200
1924	Elf	2	James H. Burke	James G. Rowe Jr.	Harry P. Whitney	5 F	0:59.20	$5,150
1923	Transmute	2	Linus McAtee	Fred Hopkins	Harry P. Whitney	5 F	0:58.80	$5,500
1922	Sunference	2	Albert Johnson	Eugene Wayland	Willis Sharpe Kilmer	5 F	0:59.40	$5,525
1921	Sweep By	2	José Rodriguez	Walter S. House	Mrs. A. R. Lawson	5 F	0:59.20	$5,275
1920	General J M Gomez	2	Tommy Murray	William L. McDaniel	Alfredo H. Diaz	5 F	0:59.00	$3,150
1919	Man o' War	2	Johnny Loftus	Louis Feustel	Glen Riddle Farm	5 F	1:01.60	$2,825
1918	High Time	2	Edward Taplin	Harry A. Morrissey	Henry A. Porter	5 F	0:58.40	$3,650
1917	Drastic	2	James Butwell	Sam Hildreth	August Belmont Jr.	5 F	1:00.20	$3,050
1916	Tumbler	2	Thomas McTaggart	James G. Rowe Sr.	Harry P. Whitney	5 F	1:00.60	$1,925
1915	Paddy Whack	2	Charles B. Borel	Richard Benson	James Butler	5 F	1:01.00	$1,525
1914	Sea Shell	2	Joe McCahey	Jack D. Adkins	Roderick J. MacKenzie	5 F	1:00.00	$8,050
1911	1913	No races held due to the Hart–Agnew Law.						
1910	Trap Rock	2	Eddie Dugan	Thomas Welsh	August Belmont Jr.	5 F	1:02.40	$3,560
1909	No race held due to the Hart–Agnew Law.							
1908	Lawton Wiggins	2	James Lee	John E. Madden	John E. Madden	5 F	1:01.00	$5,690
1907	Royal Vane	2	George Mountain	Fred Burlew	Fred Burlew	5 F	1:00.60	$5,895
1906	Gretna Green	2	LaVerne Sewell	James G. Rowe Sr.	James R. Keene	5 F	1:01.80	$4,660
1905	Jacobite	2	Willie Davis	A. Jack Joyner	Sidney Paget	5 F	1:02.00	$4,080
1904	Glorifier	2	Willie Gannon	James H. McCormick	Louis V. Bell	5 F	1:00.60	$3,720
1903	Palmbearer	2	Willie Gannon	James G. Rowe Sr.	Foxhall P. Keene	5 F	1:01.00	$5,080
1902	River Pirate	2	George M. Odom	Peter G. Wimmer	Samuel S. Brown	5 F	1:00.40	$3,950
1901	Hanover Queen	2	Henry Spencer	R. Wyndham Walden	Alfred H. & Dave H. Morris	5 F	1:02.20	$2,910
1900	Prince Charles	2	Nash Turner	Peter G. Wimmer	William Collins Whitney	5 F	1:01.60	$3,900
1899	High Order	2	Patrick A. McCue	Peter G. Wimmer	Augustus Eastin & Samuel Edward Larabie	5 F	1:01.50	$4,530
1898	Jean Bereaud	2	Tod Sloan	Sam Hildreth	John Daly	5 F	1:02.50	$4,040
1897	George Keene	2	Samuel Doggett	Edward L. Graves	E. L. Graves & Co.	5 F	1:02.75	$2,980
1896	Arbuckle (DH) George Kessler	2 2	John J. McCafferty Fred Taral	John J. McCafferty Matthew Byrnes	John J. McCafferty Matthew Byrnes	5 F	1:03.00	$2,335 $2,335
1895	Applegate	2	Lester Reiff	John J. McCafferty	John J. McCafferty	5 F	1:03.00	$4,000
1894	Gotham	2	John Lamley	John E. Campbell	Jacob Ruppert Jr.	5 F	1:02.25	$3,430
1893	Halton	2	Tod Sloan	Charles Boyle	Charles Boyle & Charles Littlefield Sr.	5 F	1:03.50	$5,680
1892	Wallace	2	Fred Taral		Kanataka Stable	5 F	1:05.00	$4,020
1891	Georgia	2	Fred Littlefield	R. Wyndham Walden	John A. & Alfred H. Morris	5 F	1:03.00	$6,500
1890	Grey Rock	2	Marty Bergen	W. H. Roller	Hoboken Stable (Gottfried F. Walbaum)	5 F	1:05.75	$5,470
1889	Ballarat	2	Anthony Hamilton	Matthew M. Allen	George Hearst	5 F	1:02.50	$5,840
1888	Oregon	2	Jim McLaughlin	Frank McCabe	Dwyer Brothers Stable	5 F	1:04.00	$2,535
1887	King Fish	2	Jim McLaughlin	Frank McCabe	Dwyer Brothers Stable	5 F	1:02.75	$2,160
