= Demoiselle Stakes =

Horse race in New York, US

- Class: Grade II
- Location: Aqueduct Racetrack; Queens, New York
- Inaugurated: 1908
- Race type: Thoroughbred – Flat racing
- Website: www.nyra.com/index_aqueduct.html

Race information
- Distance: 1 1/8 miles (9 furlongs)
- Surface: Dirt
- Track: left-handed
- Qualification: Two-year-old fillies
- Weight: Assigned
- Purse: $250,000

The Demoiselle Stakes is a stakes race for thoroughbred horses open to two-year-old fillies who are willing to race the one and one-eighth miles on dirt. The Grade II event is run at Aqueduct Racetrack every November for a current purse of $250,000.

The Demoiselle is part of the Road to the Kentucky Oaks, a points system developed by Churchill Downs to determine eligibility for the Kentucky Oaks. The Demoiselle is one of the most important races for juvenile fillies, rivalling the Spinaway Stakes, the Oak Leaf Stakes and the Breeders' Cup Juvenile Fillies in establishing the early favorite for the Oaks.

The Demoiselle, named for the French word for young woman, was run at Empire City Race Track at its inauguration in 1908, then in 1910, 1914, and from 1917 to 1942. It then moved to Jamaica Racetrack from 1943 to 1953 and from there to Aqueduct. Since inception, the Demoiselle Stakes has been contested at various distances:

- 5.5 furlongs: 1908–1936
- 5.75 furlongs: 1936–1942
- 6 furlongs: 1943–1947
- 7 furlongs: 1958–1959
- 8.5 furlongs: 1948–1953
- 8 furlongs: 1963–1974
- 9 furlongs: 1975–present

== Records ==
Speed record: (at current distance of 1 1/8 miles)

- 1:49.84 - Muhimma

Most wins by a jockey:

- 5 – Ángel Cordero Jr. (1970, 1980, 1981, 1987, 1988)

Most wins by a trainer:

- 10 – Todd A. Pletcher (2001, 2003, 2011, 2012, 2013, 2020, 2021, 2022, 2023, 2025)

Most wins by an owner:

- 4 – Harry Payne Whitney (1919, 1922, 1924, 1926)
- 4 – Cornelius V. Whitney (1932, 1941, 1947, 1970)
- 4 – Wheatley Stable (1942, 1944, 1959, 1964)

== Winners ==
Year	Winner	Jockey	Trainer	Owner	Time
2025	Zany	Irad Ortiz Jr.	Todd A. Pletcher	Repole Stable	1:50.55
2024	Muhimma	Florent Geroux	Brad H. Cox	Shadwell Stable	1:49.84
2023	Life Talk	Irad Ortiz Jr.	Todd A. Pletcher	Repole Stable	1:51.10
2022	Julia Shining	Luis Saez	Todd A. Pletcher	Stonestreet Stables	1:53.05
2021	Nest	Irad Ortiz Jr.	Todd A. Pletcher	Michael House, Eclipse Thoroughbred Partners, Repole Stable	1:55.07
2020	Malathaat	John R. Velazquez	Todd A. Pletcher	Shadwell Racing	1:52.36
2019	Lake Avenue	Junior Alvarado	William I. Mott	Godolphin, LLC	1:54.55
2018	Positive Spirit	Manny Franco	Rodolphe Brisset	Michael J. Ryan	1:56.01
2017	Wonder Gadot	John Velazquez	Mark E. Casse	Gary Barber	1:53.91
2016	Miss Sky Warrior	Paco Lopez	Kelly J. Breen	Arlene's Sun Star Stable	1:53.34
2015	Lewis Bay	Irad Ortiz Jr.	Chad C. Brown	Alpha Delta Stables	1:53.41
2014	Condo Commando	Joel Rosario	Rudy R. Rodriguez	Michael Dubb, Bethlehem Stables & Elkstone Group	1:50.40
2013	Stopchargingmaria	Javier Castellano	Todd A. Pletcher	Repole Stable	1:52.62
2012	Unlimited Budget	John Velazquez	Todd A. Pletcher	Repole Stable	1:52.16
2011	Disposablepleasure	Ramon Domínguez	Todd A. Pletcher	Glencrest Farm	1:53.10
2010	Dixie City	Jose Lezcano	Anthony W. Dutrow	Edward P. Evans	1:52.84
2009	Tizahit	Edgar Prado	George Weaver	Jim & Susan Hill	1:53.09
2008	Springside	Garrett Gomez	Josie Carroll	James & Alice Sapara	1:51.71
2007	Mushka	John Velazquez	William I. Mott	Zayat Stables LLC	1:51.61
2006	Boca Grande	Mike E. Smith	C. R. McGaughey III	Phipps Stable	1:50.17
2005	Wonder Lady Anne L.	Cornelio Velásquez	Richard E. Dutrow Jr.	IEAH Stables, Sanford H. Robbins, Orchard Kids Stable, & Steve B. Simon	1:52.85
2004	Sis City	John Velazquez	Richard E. Dutrow Jr.	Joe Torre, Michael Dubb, Ira Davis, & Sanford Goldfarb	1:50.39
2003	Ashado	Jerry Bailey	Todd A. Pletcher	Starlight Stables	1:52.88
2002	Roar Emotion	John Velazquez	Jose A. Martin	H. Joseph Allen	1:51.43
2001	Smok'n Frolic	John Velazquez	Todd A. Pletcher	Dogwood Stable	1:50.57
2000	Two Item Limit	Richard Migliore	Stephen L. DiMauro	Joseph F. Graffeo	1:52.25
1999	Jostle	Stewart Elliott	John Servis	Fox Hill Farms Inc.	1:51.51
1998†	Better Than Honour	Richard Migliore	John C. Kimmel	Robert K. Waxman	1:52.70
1997	Clark Street	Mike E. Smith	William Badgett Jr.	Shortleaf Stable	1:53.98
1996	Ajina	Pat Day	William I. Mott	Allen E. Paulson	1:53.74
1995	La Rosa	Julie Krone	Nick Zito	Michael G. Rutherford	1:50.92
1994	Minister Wife	Jerry Bailey	D. Wayne Lukas	Fares Farms	1:53.48
1993	Strategic Maneuver	Jerry Bailey	Flint S. Schulhofer	Phillip Teinowitz	1:53.62
1992	Fortunate Faith	Art Madrid Jr.	Lisa L. Lewis	Penny Lewis Whitney	1:53.59
1991	Stolen Beauty	Chris Antley	Richard A. DeStasio	Albert Fried Jr.	1:52.08
1990	Debutant's Halo	Craig Perret	Guadalupe Preciado	Jack G. Mondel	1:53.80
1989	Rootentootenwooten	Jerry Bailey	George R. Arnold III	Alex G. Campbell	1:51.60
1988	Open Mind	Ángel Cordero Jr.	D. Wayne Lukas	Eugene V. Klein	1:52.00
1987	Goodbye Halo	Ángel Cordero Jr.	Jose A. Martin	Lone Star Stable	1:53.00
1986	Tappiano	Jean Cruguet	Flint S. Schulhofer	Frances A. Genter	1:53.20
1985	I'm Sweets	Eddie Maple	Woody Stephens	Mrs. Elizabeth Moran	1:50.20
1984	Diplomette	Ruben Hernandez	Jose A. Martin	Kenneth Brausen	1:54.60
1983	Qualique	Michael Venezia	Harold B. Brice Jr.	Marc Keller	1:51.20
1982	Only Queens	Miguel A. Rivera	Joseph A. Trovato	Barry K. Schwartz	1:52.00
1981	Snow Plow	Ángel Cordero Jr.	Leon Blusiewicz	Stephen D. Peskoff	1:53.00
1980	Rainbow Connection	Ángel Cordero Jr.	Gerry Belanger	R. Cameron Edgar	1:50.80
1979	Genuine Risk	Laffit Pincay Jr.	LeRoy Jolley	Diana M. Firestone	1:51.20
1978	Plankton	Ruben Hernandez	Roger Laurin	Mrs. Roger Laurin	1:50.00
1977	Caesar's Wish	Danny Ray Wright	Richard W. Small	Sally Gibson	1:50.60
1976	Bring Out The Band	Donald Brumfield	John W. Murphy	Hickory Tree Stable	1:50.80
1975	Free Journey	Laffit Pincay Jr.	John P. Campo	Elmendorf Farm	1:50.20
1974	Land Girl	Jacinto Vásquez	John A. Nerud	Tartan Stable	1:36.20
1973	Chris Evert	Laffit Pincay Jr.	Joseph A. Trovato	Carl Rosen	1:36.40
1972	Protest	Angel Santiago	John P. Campo	Elmendorf Farm	1:37.60
1971	Dresden Doll	Gene St. Leon	Frank Catrone	Ada L. Rice	1:35.80
1970	Inca Queen	Ángel Cordero Jr.	Ivor G. Balding	Cornelius V. Whitney	1:36.40
1969	Native Fern	John Ruane	William Boland	Hardly Able Stable	1:38.80
1968	Queen's Double	Braulio Baeza	J. Homer Hayes	Meadow Stable	1:39.20
1967	Allie's Serenade	John L. Rotz	Max Hirsch	Mereworth Farm	1:40.40
1966	Woozem	Kenny Knapp	Willard L. Proctor	J. Graham Brown	1:35.60
1965	Indian Sunlite	William Boland	Sherrill W. Ward	George M. Humphrey	1:38.20
1964	Discipline	Ismael Valenzuela	William C. Winfrey	Wheatley Stable	1:39.20
1963	Windsor Lady	Bill Hartack	Warren J. Pascuma	Raymond Karlinsky	1:37.40
1960	– 1962	Race not held			
1959	Irish Jay	Eddie Arcaro	James E. Fitzsimmons	Wheatley Stable	1:23.60
1958	Khalita	Eddie Arcaro	Malcolm Anderson	W. N. Modglin	1:25.60
1954	– 1957	Race not held			
1953	O'Alison	Jimmy Nichols	Philip Godfrey	Philip Godfrey	1:46.40
1952	Grecian Queen	Eric Guerin	James P. Conway	Florence Whitaker	1:46.60
1951	Rose Jet	Hedley Woodhouse	Richard E. Handlen	Foxcatcher Farm	1:46.20
1950	Aunt Jinny	Nick Wall	Duval A. Headley	Duval A. Headley	1:45.80
1949	Bed o'Roses	Eric Guerin	William C. Winfrey	Alfred G. Vanderbilt II	1:45.80
1948	Lithe	Willie Garner	Frank S. Barnett	Hal Price Headley	1:48.20
1947	Ghost Run	Ruperto Donoso	Sylvester Veitch	Cornelius V. Whitney	1:13.60
1946	Carolyn A.	Eddie Arcaro	James P. Conway	Florence Whitaker	1:12.60
1945	War Kilt	Arnold Kirkland	Tom Smith	Maine Chance Farm	1:12.40
1944	Drumuir	Robert Permane	James E. Fitzsimmons	Wheatley Stable	1:13.00
1943	Thread o'Gold	James Stout	James E. Fitzsimmons	Belair Stud	1:13.80
1942	Optimism	Johnny Longden	James E. Fitzsimmons	Wheatley Stable	1:09.40
1941	Pig Tails	Jack Skelly	Sylvester Veitch	Cornelius V. Whitney	1:10.20
1940	Level Best	Basil James	John P. (Doc) Jones	Crispin Oglebay	1:09.20
1939	Now What	Raymond Workman	Bud Stotler	Alfred G. Vanderbilt II	1:09.00
1938	Donita M.	Wayne D. Wright	Phil Reuter	Longchamps Farm	1:11.40
1937	Inhale	John Gilbert	Thomas J. Healey	John Hay Whitney	1:11.20
1936	Broad Ripple	John Gilbert	John P. (Doc) Jones	Mrs. Raymond A. Van Clief	1:10.60
1933	– 1935	Race not held			
1932	Disdainful	Alfred Robertson	Thomas J. Healey	Cornelius V. Whitney	1:07.00
1931	Straightlace	Edgar Barnes	A. Jack Joyner	George D. Widener Jr.	1:08.40
1930	Straying	Linus McAtee	George M. Odom	Robert L. Gerry Sr.	1:06.60
1929	The Beasel	Willie Kelsay	Henry McDaniel	Gifford A. Cochran	1:07.00
1928	Toki	Linus McAtee	Max Hirsch	George W. Loft	1:07.60
1927	Fair Mist	Charles Craigmile	Henry McDaniel	Willis Sharpe Kilmer	1:07.00
1926	Pandera	Linus McAtee	James G. Rowe Sr.	Harry Payne Whitney	1:06.00
1925	Ethereal	Frank Coltiletti	Thomas J. Healey	Richard T. Wilson Jr.	1:07.00
1924	Maud Muller	Linus McAtee	James G. Rowe Sr.	Harry Payne Whitney	1:06.60
1923	Fluvanna	George Babin	Max Hirsch	Salubria Stable	1:06.40
1922	Cresta	Leslie Penman	James G. Rowe Sr.	Harry Payne Whitney	1:07.60
1921	My Reverie	Clarence Kummer	D. R. McDaniel	R. J. Brown	1:07.60
1920	Nancy Lee	Lawrence Lyke	James H. McCormick	P. A. Clark	1:07.80
1919	Panoply	Willie Knapp	James G. Rowe Sr.	Harry Payne Whitney	1:09.20
1918	Lady Rosebud	J. Collins	Rody Patterson	Robert L. Gerry Sr.	1:07.60
1917	Wawbeek	Merritt C. Buxton	Hollie Hughes	John Sanford	1:09.00
1916	Tragedy	T. Davis	William H. Karrick	Oneck Stable	1:07.00
1915	Celandria	Merritt C. Buxton	James A. McLaughlin	Elkwood Park Stable	1:07.00
1914	Coquette	Merritt C. Buxton	George M. Odom	Brookside Stable	1:07.00
1913	Race not held				
1912	No races held due to the Hart–Agnew Law.				
1911	No races held due to the Hart–Agnew Law.				
1910	Round the World	Frederick Herbert	J. H. Armstrong	William G. Yanke	1:08.60
1909	no race				
1908	Melisande	Joe Notter	James G. Rowe Sr.	James R. Keene	1:06.40

† In 1998, Tutorial finished first but was disqualified and placed fifth.

== See also ==
- Road to the Kentucky Oaks
