= Keene Memorial Stakes =

- Class: Discontinued stakes
- Location: Belmont Park, Elmont, New York, United States
- Inaugurated: 1913
- Race type: Thoroughbred - Flat racing

Race information
- Distance: 4.5 furlongs
- Surface: Dirt
- Track: left-handed
- Qualification: Two years old

The Keene Memorial Stakes was an American Thoroughbred horse race run for twenty years from 1913 through 1932 at Belmont Park, in Elmont, New York. The race was created to honor James R. Keene who died on January 3, 1913. A Wall Street stockbroker, Keene was a major owner and breeder of Thoroughbred racehorses and would become one of the U.S. Racing Hall of Fame's Pillars of the Turf.

== Historical notes ==
The distance for the first two editions of the Keene Memorial Stakes were set at six furlongs over the main course. Then, in 1915 the race was shortened to 5 1/2 furlongs and transferred to the track's straight course. In 1926 the distance was reduced to 4 1/2 furlongs.

Reflecting a recognition by stable owners of James R. Keene's place in Thoroughbred racing history, every single winner of the Keene Memorial Stakes during the twenty years it was run was owned by one of the Who's Who of that era.

The inaugural running of the Keene Memorial Stakes took place on July 5, 1913 and was won by the filly Stake and Cap. She was owned by the prominent Virginia businessman Thomas Fortune Ryan who raced under the nom de course Oak Ridge Stable.

The 1914 Keene Memorial was won by James Butler's filly Comely for whom the Comely Stakes at Aqueduct Racetrack would be named. James R. Keene was the breeder of Comely and sold her in a package deal to James Butler who bought the entire 1912 crop produced by his Castleton Stud.

The 1917 Keene Memorial Stakes was run in a heavy rainstorm and no time was recorded.

Just three days after winning his career debut the legendary Man o' War easily won the 1919 edition.

The 1925 winner Friar's Carse went on to earn American Champion Two-Year-Old Filly honors.

In 1930, that year's American Champion Two-Year-Old Colt Equipoise would have a career that saw him earn at total of six National Championship honors including twice as the American Horse of the Year and become a National Museum of Racing and Hall of Fame inductee.

The 1932 Keene Memorial Stakes was won by Sonny Whitney's colt Caterwaul who defeated ten other two-year-olds.

By late fall of 1932 the Great Depression saw economic conditions worsening which forced the Westchester Racing Association, operators of Belmont Park, to eliminate five races. As a result, the May 14, 1932 race would prove to be the Keene Memorial's final running.

== Records ==
Speed record:

- 1:05 0/0 @ 5.5 furlongs : Ormsdale
- 0:51 2/5 @ 4.5 furlongs : Afterglow

Most wins by a jockey:

- 2 - Joe McCahey (1913, 1915)
- 2 - Albert Johnson (1923, 1925)
- 2 - Johnny Loftus (1917, 1919)
- 2 - Linus McAtee (1924, 1926)
- 2 - Raymond Workman (1930, 1932)

Most wins by a trainer:

- 4 - Thomas J. Healey (1915, 1918, 1930, 1932)

Most wins by an owner:

- 3 - Rancocas Stable (1921, 1928, 1929)
- 3 - Harry Payne Whitney (1920, 1926, 1930)

== Winners ==
Year	Winner	Age	Jockey	Trainer	Owner	Dist. (Furlongs)	Time	Win$
1932	Caterwaul	2	Raymond Workman	Thomas J. Healey	Cornelius Vanderbilt Whitney	4.5 F	0:52.40	$7,500
1931	Fall Apple	2	Alfred Robertson	Fred Hopkins	Cornelius Vanderbilt Whitney	4.5 F	0:54.80	$7,075
1930	Equipoise	2	Raymond Workman	Fred Hopkins	Cornelius Vanderbilt Whitney	4.5 F	0:52.60	$7,625
1929	Mokatam	2	Earl Steffen	Sam Hildreth	Rancocas Stable	4.5 F	0:52.40	$8,100
1928	Simba	2	Laverne Fator	Sam Hildreth	Rancocas Stable	5.5 F	1:07.80	$7,825
1927	Dice	2	Danny McAuliffe	James E. Fitzsimmons	Wheatley Stable	4.5 F	0:52.00	$7,575
1926	Afterglow	2	Linus McAtee	James G. Rowe Sr.	Harry Payne Whitney	4.5 F	0:51.40	$6,625
1925	Friar's Carse	2	Albert Johnson	Gwyn R. Tompkins	Glen Riddle Farm	5.5 F	1:05.40	$6,750
1924	Laplander	2	Linus McAtee	William M. Garth	Joshua S. Cosden	5.5 F	1:07.20	$5,577
1923	Mint Briar	2	Albert Johnson	John I. Smith	Willis Sharpe Kilmer	5.5 F	1:05.40	$6,050
1922	Cherry Pie	2	Lawrence Lyke	Scott P. Harlan	Greentree Stable	5.5 F	1:05.40	$6,200
1921	William A	2	Earl Sande	Sam Hildreth	Rancocas Stable	5.5 F	1:05.20	$6,525
1920	Tryster	2	Eddie Ambrose	James G. Rowe Sr.	Harry Payne Whitney	5.5 F	1:05.60	$5,150
1919	Man o' War	2	Johnny Loftus	Louis Feustel	Glen Riddle Farm	5.5 F	1:05.60	$4,200
1918	Hannibal	2	Willie Knapp	Thomas J. Healey	Richard T. Wilson Jr.	5.5 F	1:05.00	$6,850
1917	Tracksend	2	Johnny Loftus	Walter B. Jennings	A. Kingsley Macomber	5.5 F	0:00.00	$5,350
1916	Ivory Black	2	Frank Keogh	John H. McCormack	James Butler	5.5 F	1:04.40	$3,900
1915	Ormesdale	2	Joe McCahey	Thomas J. Healey	Richard T. Wilson Jr.	5.5 F	1:05.00	$2,325
1914	Comely	2	John McCabe	Richard C. Benson	James Butler	6 F	1:13.20	$4,600
1913	Stake and Cap	2	Joe McCahey	William M. Carter	Oak Ridge Stable	6 F	1:14.20	$3,275
