= Hopeful Stakes =

Annual American Thoroughbred horse race in Saratoga Springs, New York, USA

- Class: Grade I
- Location: Saratoga Race Course; Saratoga Springs, New York, United States
- Inaugurated: 1903
- Race type: Thoroughbred – Flat racing
- Website: https://www.nyra.com/saratoga/racing/stakes-schedule/hopeful/

Race information
- Distance: 7 furlongs
- Surface: Dirt
- Track: left-handed
- Qualification: Two-year-olds
- Weight: 120 lbs.
- Purse: $300,000 (2021)

The Hopeful Stakes is an American Thoroughbred horse race run annually at Saratoga Race Course in Saratoga Springs, New York. Open to two-year-old horses, the Hopeful is the first Grade I stakes for two-year-olds each season and historically has been a showcase for some of the top East Coast horses at that age group. Raced on the dirt over a distance of seven furlongs, the Grade I event currently offers a purse of $350,000.

Inaugurated in 1903, the first edition was won by Delhi who went on to win the 1904 Belmont Stakes. In 1904, the Hopeful Stakes was won by the filly Tanya. She would go on to win the 1905 Belmont Stakes.

Initially raced at a distance of six furlongs, from 1925 through 1993 it was run at 6 1/2 furlongs and since 1994 at seven furlongs. Currently, the Hopeful Stakes is the first influential prep race leading up to the Breeders' Cup Juvenile and since 1925 has been a competition that marks the first time two-year-olds are tested at a distance beyond six furlongs. The name stems from the hope that every two-year-old handler has for their horse's racing future.

Due to the State of New York's legislated ban on parimutuel betting, there was no race in 1911 and 1912. During World War II, the Hopeful Stakes was run at Belmont Park in 1943, 1944, and 1945.

Only four horses have ever won all three Saratoga stakes events for two-year-olds. Regret (1914), Campfire (1916), Dehere (1993), and City Zip (2000) each swept the Hopeful Stakes, Saratoga Special Stakes, and the Sanford Stakes.

In 2008, the race was sponsored by Three Chimneys Farm of Midway, Kentucky.

== Records ==
Time record: (at current 7 furlong distance)

- 1:21.29 – Jackie's Warrior (2020)

Most wins by an owner:

- 4 – George D. Widener Jr. (1928, 1950, 1961, 1966)

Most wins by a jockey:

- 6 – Jerry D. Bailey (1982, 1983, 1999, 2000, 2003, 2005)

Most wins by trainer:

- 8 – D. Wayne Lukas (1990, 1991, 1995, 1999, 2000, 2009, 2013, 2017)

== Winners ==
Year	Winner	Jockey	Trainer	Owner	Distance	Time	Gr.
2026	The Good Life	Manuel Franco	Brad H. Cox	WinStar Farm	7 f	1:24.08	G1
2025	Ted Noffey	John R. Velazquez	Todd A. Pletcher	Spendthrift Farm	7 f	1:22.35	G1
2024	Chancer McPatrick	Flavien Prat	Chad C. Brown	Flanagan Racing	7 f	1:23.44	G1
2023	Nutella Fella	Junior Alvarado	Gary C. Contessa	Bell Gable Stable	7 f	1:24.41	G1
2022	Forte (Note: Forte was disqualified from his win in the 2022 Hopeful Stakes due to a medication violation. The connections are appealing through the New York State Courts. As of the latest ruling in December 2023, Equibase still lists Forte as the winner.)	Irad Ortiz Jr.	Todd A. Pletcher	Repole Stable & St. Elias Stable	7 f	1:22.58	G1
2021	Gunite	Ricardo Santana Jr.	Steven M. Asmussen	Winchell Thoroughbreds	7 f	1:23.08	G1
2020	Jackie's Warrior	Joel Rosario	Steven M. Asmussen	J. Kirk & Judy Robison	7 f	1:21.29	G1
2019	Basin	José Ortiz	Steven M. Asmussen	Jackpot Farm (Terry Green)	7 f	1:23.48	G1
2018	Mind Control	John R. Velazquez	Gregory D. Sacco	Red Oak Stable (Steve Brunetti) & Madaket Stables, LLC	7 f	1:22.99	G1
2017	Sporting Chance	Luis Saez	D. Wayne Lukas	Robert C. Baker & William L. Mack	7 f	1:23.71	G1
2016	Practical Joke	José Ortiz	Chad Brown	Klaravich Stables & William Lawrence	7 f	1:23.39	G1
2015	Ralis	Javier Castellano	Doug F. O'Neill	Reddam Racing	7 f	1:22.30	G1
2014	Competitive Edge	John R. Velazquez	Todd A. Pletcher	Nancy Favreau, Kathy Psoinos LLC, Michael Tabor	7 f	1:24.11	G1
2013	Strong Mandate	José Ortiz	D. Wayne Lukas	Robert C. Baker & William L. Mack	7 f	1:23.55	G1
2012	Shanghai Bobby	Rosie Napravnik	Todd A. Pletcher	Starlight Racing (Jack & Laurie Wolf)	7 f	1:22.72	G1
2011	Currency Swap	Rajiv Maragh	Terri Pompay	Klaravich Stables & William Lawrence	7 f	1:26.16	G1
2010	Boys At Tosconova	Ramon Domínguez	Richard E. Dutrow Jr.	Jay Em Ess Stable, et al.	7 f	1:23.27	G1
2009	Dublin	Jamie Theriot	D. Wayne Lukas	Robert C. Baker & William L. Mack	7 f	1:23.52	G1
2008	Vineyard Haven	Alan Garcia	Robert J. Frankel	Robert J. Frankel, Louis Lazzinnaro, Diamond Pride LLC	7 f	1:23.40	G1
2007	Majestic Warrior	Garrett Gomez	William I. Mott	Kinsman Stable	7 f	1:23.04	G1
2006	Circular Quay	Garrett Gomez	Todd A. Pletcher	Michael & Doreen Tabor	7 f	1:23.00	G1
2005	First Samurai	Jerry D. Bailey	Frank L. Brothers	Bruce Lunsford & Lansdon B. Robbins III	7 f	1:23.25	G1
2004	Afleet Alex	Jeremy Rose	Tim Ritchey	Cash is King LLC	7 f	1:23.58	G1
2003	Silver Wagon	Jerry D. Bailey	Ralph Ziadie	Buckram Oak Farm	7 f	1:23.47	G1
2002	Sky Mesa	Edgar Prado	John T. Ward	John C. Oxley	7 f	1:23.08	G1
2001	Came Home	Chris McCarron	J. Paco Gonzalez	Trudy McCaffery	7 f	1:21.94	G1
2000	Yonaguska (DH)	Jerry D. Bailey	D. Wayne Lukas	Michael Tabor	7 f	1:24.52	G1
2000	City Zip (DH)	José A. Santos	Linda L. Rice	Charles R. Thompson & Carl T. Bowling	7 f	1:24.52	G1
1999	High Yield	Jerry D. Bailey	D. Wayne Lukas	Bob & Beverly Lewis	7 f	1:22.85	G1
1998	Lucky Roberto	Robbie Davis	Frank A. Alexander	Jesse Robinson	7 f	1:23.81	G1
1997	Favorite Trick	Pat Day	Patrick B. Byrne	Joseph LaCombe	7 f	1:23.87	G1
1996	Smoke Glacken	Craig Perret	Henry L. Carroll	Karkenny Levy et al.	7 f	1:23.63	G1
1995	Hennessy	Gary Stevens	D. Wayne Lukas	Bob & Beverly Lewis	7 f	1:23.44	G1
1994	Wild Escapade	Jorge F. Chavez	Leo O'Brien	Dogwood Stable	7 f	1:23.24	G1
1993	Dehere	Chris McCarron	Reynaldo Nobles	Due Process Stable	6.5 f	1:15.80	G1
1992	Great Navigator	Aaron Gryder	John F. Mazza	Roron Stables (Ron & Rosemary Shockley)	6.5 f	1:15.71	G1
1991	Salt Lake	Mike E. Smith	D. Wayne Lukas	William T. Young	6.5 f	1:17.74	G1
1990	Deposit Ticket	Gary Stevens	D. Wayne Lukas	Overbrook Farm	6.5 f	1:16.20	G1
1989	Summer Squall	Pat Day	Neil J. Howard	Dogwood Stable	6.5 f	1:16.80	G1
1988	Mercedes Won	Robbie Davis	Arnold Fink	Christopher Spencer	6.5 f	1:16.60	G1
1987	Crusader Sword	Randy Romero	MacKenzie Miller	Rokeby Stable	6.5 f	1:18.60	G1
1986	Gulch	Ángel Cordero Jr.	LeRoy Jolley	Peter M. Brant	6.5 f	1:16.40	G1
1985	Papal Power	Don MacBeth	Charles Peoples	Bayard Sharp	6.5 f	1:18.40	G1
1984	Chief's Crown	Don MacBeth	Roger Laurin	Star Crown Stable (Andrew Rosen, et al.)	6.5 f	1:16.00	G1
1983	Capitol South	Jerry D. Bailey	Lou Rondinello	Darby Dan Farm	6.5 f	1:17.40	G1
1982	Copelan	Jerry D. Bailey	Mitchell Griffin	Fred W. Hooper	6.5 f	1:16.60	G1
1981	Timely Writer	Roger Danjean	Dominic Imprescia	Peter Martin	6.5 f	1:16.20	G1
1980	Tap Shoes	Ruben Hernandez	Howard M. Tesher	Leone J. Peters	6.5 f	1:17.00	G1
1979	J.P. Brother (Note: In 1979, Rockhill Native finished first but was disqualified and placed sixth.)	Joseph Imparato	John P. Campo	Diamond Peg Stable (Mrs. John P. Campo)	6.5 f	1:16.20	G1
1978	General Assembly	Darrel McHargue	LeRoy Jolley	Bertram R. Firestone	6.5 f	1:16.40	G1
1977	Affirmed	Steve Cauthen	Laz Barrera	Harbor View Farm	6.5 f	1:15.40	G1
1976	Banquet Table	Jean Cruguet	George T. Poole Jr.	Cornelius Vanderbilt Whitney	6.5 f	1:16.20	G1
1975-1	Jackknife	Jean Cruguet	John P. Campo	Elmendorf Farm	6.5 f	1:16.60	G1
1975-2	Eustace	James Nichols	Wayne Rose	Eugene Cashman	6.5 f	1:16.40	G1
1974-1	The Bagel Prince	Ángel Cordero Jr.	John Pappalardo	Edward Shamie	6.5 f	1:16.80	G1
1974-2	Foolish Pleasure	Braulio Baeza	LeRoy Jolley	John L. Greer	6.5 f	1:16.00	G1
1973	Gusty O'Shay	Robert Kotenko	Harrison E. Johnson	Helen Hopkins	6.5 f	1:16.40	G1
1972	Secretariat	Ron Turcotte	Lucien Laurin	Meadow Stable	6.5 f	1:16.20	
1971	Rest Your Case	Jacinto Vásquez	MacKenzie Miller	Cragwood Stables	6.5 f	1:17.40	
1970	Proudest Roman	John L. Rotz	Woody Stephens	Mrs. John A. Morris	6.5 f	1:18.60	
1969	Irish Castle	Braulio Baeza	Edward A. Neloy	Wheatley Stable	6.5 f	1:17.20	
1968	Top Knight	Manuel Ycaza	Raymond Metcalf	Steven B. Wilson	6.5 f	1:16.00	
1967	What A Pleasure	Braulio Baeza	Edward A. Neloy	Wheatley Stable	6.5 f	1:16.40	
1966	Bold Hour	John L. Rotz	Bert Mulholland	George D. Widener Jr.	6.5 f	1:17.20	
1965	Buckpasser	Braulio Baeza	Edward A. Neloy	Ogden Phipps	6.5 f	1:16.00	
1964	Bold Lad	Braulio Baeza	Edward A. Neloy	Wheatley Stable	6.5 f	1:15.60	
1963	Traffic	Manuel Ycaza	Lucien Laurin	Reginald N. Webster	6.5 f	1:18.60	
1962	Outing Class	Donald Pierce	John M. Gaver Sr.	Greentree Stable	6.5 f	1:17.00	
1961	Jaipur	Bill Shoemaker	Bert Mulholland	George D. Widener Jr.	6.5 f	1:16.40	
1960	Hail To Reason	Bobby Ussery	Hirsch Jacobs	Patrice Jacobs	6.5 f	1:16.00	
1959	Tompion	Bill Shoemaker	Sylvester Veitch	C. V. Whitney	6.5 f	1:17.40	
1958	First Landing	Eddie Arcaro	Casey Hayes	Christopher Chenery	6.5 f	1:17.80	
1957	Rose Trellis	Frank Lovato	Richard E. Handlen	Foxcatcher Farm	6.5 f	1:18.40	
1956	King Hairan	Eddie Arcaro	Raymond Metcalf	Leo Edwards	6.5 f	1:18.40	
1955	Needles	John Choquette	Hugh L. Fontaine	D & H Stable (Jack Dudley & Bonnie Heath)	6.5 f	1:18.20	
1954	Nashua	Eddie Arcaro	Jim Fitzsimmons	Belair Stud	6.5 f	1:17.80	
1953	Artismo	Dave Gorman	Robert L. Dotter	James Cox Brady Jr.	6.5 f	1:18.00	
1952	Native Dancer	Eric Guerin	William C. Winfrey	Alfred G. Vanderbilt Jr.	6.5 f	1:18.80	
1951	Cousin	Eric Guerin	William C. Winfrey	Alfred G. Vanderbilt Jr.	6.5 f	1:19.20	
1950	Battlefield	Eric Guerin	Bert Mulholland	George D. Widener Jr.	6.5 f	1:18.00	
1949	Middleground	Dave Gorman	Max Hirsch	King Ranch	6.5 f	1:18.40	
1948	Blue Peter	Eric Guerin	Andy Schuttinger	Joseph M. Roebling	6.5 f	1:19.20	
1947	Relic	John H. Adams	George P. "Maj" Odom	Circle M. Farm (Edward S. Moore)	6.5 f	1:17.40	
1946	Blue Border	Abelardo DeLara	James W. Smith	Edward R. Bradley	6.5 f	1:17.00	
1945	Star Pilot	Arnold Kirkland	Tom Smith	Maine Chance Farm	6.5 f	1:16.60	
1944	Pavot	George Woolf	Oscar White	Walter M. Jeffords	6.5 f	1:18.80	
1943	Bee Mac	Sterling Young	James W. Smith	Beatrice MacGuire	6.5 f	1:18.40	
1942	Devil's Thumb	Conn McCreary	Cecil Wilhelm	William Edward Boeing	6.5 f	1:18.40	
1941	Devil Diver	Jack Skelly	John M. Gaver Sr.	Greentree Stable	6.5 f	1:18.60	
1940	Whirlaway	Johnny Longden	Ben A. Jones	Calumet Farm	6.5 f	1:18.00	
1939	Bimelech	Fred A. Smith	William A. Hurley	Edward R. Bradley	6.5 f	1:18.80	
1938	El Chico	Nick Wall	Matthew Peter Brady	William Ziegler Jr.	6.5 f	1:18.40	
1937	Sky Larking	Alfred Robertson	Robert McGarvey	Milky Way Farm Stable	6.5 f	1:20.80	
1936	Maedic	Eddie Litzenberger	William A. Hurley	Maemere Farm (DeWitt Page)	6.5 f	1:20.20	
1935	Red Rain	Raymond Workman	Thomas J. Healey	C. V. Whitney	6.5 f	1:19.80	
1934	Psychic Bid	Mack Garner	Robert A. Smith	Brookmeade Stable	6.5 f	1:18.80	
1933	Bazaar	Don Meade	Herbert J. Thompson	Edward R. Bradley	6.5 f	1:19.00	
1932	Ladysman	Robert Jones	Bennett W. Creech	William R. Coe	6.5 f	1:19.40	
1931	Tick On	Pete Walls	Max Hirsch	Loma Stable (Marie Kaufman)	6.5 f	1:20.40	
1930	Epithet	Willie Kelsay	Henry McDaniel	Gifford A. Cochran	6.5 f	1:17.60	
1929	Boojum	Raymond Workman	James G. Rowe Jr.	Harry Payne Whitney	6.5 f	1:17.00	
1928	Jack High	George Ellis	A. Jack Joyner	George D. Widener Jr.	6.5 f	1:19.40	
1927	Brooms	John Maiben	Gwyn R. Tompkins	Brookmeade Stable	6.5 f	1:20.00	
1926	Lord Chaucer	Frank Coltiletti	J. H. "Bud" Stotler	Sagamore Farm	6.5 f	1:19.80	
1925	Pompey	Laverne Fator	William H. Karrick	Shoshone Stable	6.5 f	1:17.80	
1924	Master Charlie	George Babin	Andrew G. Blakely	William Daniel	6 f	1:13.00	
1923	Diogenes	Clyde Ponce	Robert A. Smith	Walter M. Jeffords	6 f	1:12.60	
1922	Dunlin	Clarence Kummer	William M. Garth	Joshua S. Cosden	6 f	1:12.40	
1921	Morvich	Albert Johnson	Fred Burlew	Benjamin Block	6 f	1:12.60	
1920	Leonardo II	Andy Schuttinger	Kimball Patterson	Xalapa Farm (Edward F. Simms)	6 f	1:12.40	
1919	Man o' War	Johnny Loftus	Louis Feustel	Glen Riddle Farm	6 f	1:13.00	
1918	Eternal	Andy Schuttinger	Kimball Patterson	James W. McClelland	6 f	1:13.60	
1917	Sun Briar	Willie Knapp	Henry McDaniel	Willis Sharpe Kilmer	6 f	1:15.60	
1916	Campfire	John McTaggart	Thomas J. Healey	Richard T. Wilson Jr.	6 f	1:14.60	
1915	Dominant	Joe Notter	James G. Rowe Sr.	Lewis S. Thompson	6 f	1:13.80	
1914	Regret	Joe Notter	James G. Rowe Sr.	Harry Payne Whitney	6 f	1:16.40	
1913	Bringhurst	Johnny Loftus	J. Oliver Keene	Johnson N. Camden Jr.	6 f	1:12.40	
1912	No races held due to the Hart–Agnew Law.						
1911	No races held due to the Hart–Agnew Law.						
1910	Novelty	A. Thomas	Sam Hildreth	Sam Hildreth	6 f	1:14.00	
1909	Rocky O'Brien	Vincent Powers	Kimball Patterson	James MacManus	6 f	1:13.20	
1908	Helmet	Joe Notter	James G. Rowe Sr.	James R. Keene	6 f	1:12.20	
1907	Jim Gaffney	David Nicol	Frank D. Weir	Frank J. Farrell	6 f	1:15.00	
1906	Peter Pan	Willie Knapp	James G. Rowe Sr.	James R. Keene	6 f	1:12.20	
1905	Mohawk II	Arthur Redfern	Hubert H. Hyner	John Sanford	6 f	1:13.40	
1904	Tanya	Gene Hildebrand	John W. Rogers	Herman B. Duryea	6 f	1:13.20	
1903	Delhi	Willie Gannon	James G. Rowe Sr.	James R. Keene	6 f	1:13.20	
