= Fall Highweight Stakes =

- Location: Aqueduct Racetrack; Queens, New York; United States
- Inaugurated: 1914
- Race type: Thoroughbred, Flat racing

Race information
- Distance: 6 furlongs
- Surface: Dirt
- Track: Left-handed
- Qualification: Three years old & up
- Weight: Allowance (high weights)
- Purse: $150,000 (2024)

The Fall Highweight Stakes (formerly the Fall Highweight Handicap) is an American Thoroughbred horse race held annually near the end of November at Aqueduct Racetrack in Queens, New York. Currently run at a distance of 6 furlongs (1,207 m), it is open to horses three years of age and older. As the name implies, the race is known for the unusually high weights assigned to each of the horses. The race was run under handicap weights until 2024, when it was changed to allowance conditions with a maximum weight of 136 pounds (62 kg).

In the past the top-weighted horse was assigned a minimum of 140 pounds (64 kg). Although the 140 pound rule is no longer in place, horses still carry more weight than they normally would. The highweight in the 2015 renewal, for example, carried 134 pounds.

Run at Belmont Park from its inception in 1914 to 1959 and again from 1963 to 1993, the Fall Highweight was open to horses of any age until 1959 when it was changed to its present format. It was raced on a straight course prior to 1921, from 1926 to 1939, and again from 1942 to 1957. A large field resulted in the 1976 edition being run in two divisions.

The inaugural running of the Fall Highweight in 1914 was a remarkable victory for Comely who was not only a filly that defeated male rivals, but the only two-year-old to ever win the race.

== Records ==
Speed record:

- 1:08.40 - Ariel Lad (1944)
- 1:08.40 - Hitex (1952)

Most wins:

- 2 - Miss Merriment (1934, 1936)
- 2 - Cassis (1943, 1946)
- 2 - Ta Wee (1969, 1970)
- 2 - Honorable Miss (1975, 1976)
- 2 - What A Summer (1977, 1978)

Most wins by a jockey:

- 5 - Eddie Arcaro (1937, 1944, 1948, 1952, 1958)
- 5 - John L. Rotz (1964, 1967, 1969, 1970, 1972)
- 5 - Jorge Chavez (1991, 1995, 1996, 1998, 1999)

Most wins by a trainer:

- 5 - D. Wayne Lukas (1985, 1990, 1992, 1994, 2001)

Most wins by an owner:

- 4 - Joseph E. Widener (1919, 1929, 1931, 1941)

== Winners ==
Year	Winner	Age	Jockey	Trainer	Owner	Dist. (Furlongs)	Time	Win $	Gr.
2024	Giant Mischief	4	Manuel Franco	Brad H. Cox	Spendthrift Farm, Stonestreet Stables, Martin S. Schwartz, et al.	6 f	1:09.20	$82,500	
2023	Bold Journey	4	José Ortiz	William I. Mott	Gary Barber, Pantofel Stable LLC & Wachtel Stable	6 f	1:10.91	$110,000	G3
2022	Greeley and Ben	8	Manuel Franco	Faith Wilson	Darryl E. Abramowitz	6 f	1:11.95	$175,000	G3
2021	Hopeful Treasure	4	Mychel Sanchez	Michael Catalano Jr.	Just In Time Racing	6 f	1:11.19	$110,000	G3
2020	Share The Ride	5	José Ortiz	Antonio Arriaga	Dixiana Farms LLC (William & Donna Shively)	6 f	1:10.62	$100,000	G3
2019	Happy Farm	5	Jorge A. Vargas Jr.	Jason Servis	M and A Racing Ltd.	6 f	1:11.91	$115,500	G3
2018	Life in Shambles	7	Irad Ortiz Jr.	Jason Servis	Ara Aprahamian	6 f	1:12.07	$115,500	G3
2017	Stallwalkin' Dude	7	Joel Rosario	David Jacobson	David Jacobson & Head of Plains Partners (Sol Kumin)	6 f	1:11.11	$120,000	G3
2016	Heaven's Runway	6	Junior Alvarado	Rudy R. Rodriguez	Michael Dubb & Michael Imperio	6 f	1:10.19	$120,000	G3
2015	Green Gratto	5	Kendrick Carmouche	Gaston Grant	Gaston & Anthony Grant	6 f	1:09.95	$120,000	G3
2014	Salutos Amigos	4	Cornelio Velásquez	David Jacobson	David Jacobson & Southern Equine Stable LLC (Mike Moreno)	6 f	1:10.78	$180,000	G3
2013	Palace	4	Cornelio Velásquez	Linda L. Rice	Antonino Miuccio	6 f	1:09.82	$180,000	G3
2012	Caixa Eletronica	7	Javier Castellano	Todd Pletcher	Mike Repole	6 f	1:08.69	$90,000	G3
2011	Sunrise Smarty	4	Ramon Domínguez	Michael Hushion	West Point Thoroughbreds, Donald Brooks, Nick Cammarano	6 f	1:09.97	$60,000	G3
2010	Endless Circle	6	Edgar Prado	Rudy R. Rodriguez	Vincent S. Scuderi & James A. Riccio	6 f	1:09.79	$60,000	G3
2009	Cherokee Country	5	Jose Lezcano	Ramon Preciado	Victory Thoroughbreds LLC (Lou Cacchio)	6 f	1:09.29	$66,000	G3
2008	Fabulous Strike	5	Ramon Domínguez	Todd Beattie	Walter Downey	6 f	1:09.02	$66,720	
2007	Grand Champion	4	Eibar Coa	James A. Jerkens	Susan & John Moore	6 f	1:09.90	$65,520	
2006	Afrashad	4	Richard Migliore	Saeed bin Suroor	Godolphin Racing	6 f	1:11.05	$64,980	
2005	Attila's Storm	3	Pablo Morales	Richard Schosberg	Barry K. Schwartz	6 f	1:09.30	$67,500	
2004	Thunder Touch	3	Rafael Bejarano	Kiaran McLaughlin	Stronach Stables	6 f	1:09.83	$66,960	
2003	Bossanova	3	Edgar Prado	H. James Bond	Lorraine & Rod Rodriguez	6 f	1:10.06	$64,980	
2002	True Direction	3	Javier Castellano	Carlos Morales	Morton & Marisol Binn	6 f	1:09.62	$66,960	
2001	Yonaguska	3	José A. Santos	D. Wayne Lukas	Michael Tabor	6 f	1:09.60	$67,320	
2000	Kashatreya	6	Octavio Vergara	John O. Hertler	Seymour Cohn	6 f	1:11.03	$67,140	
1999	Richter Scale	5	Jorge Chavez	Mary Jo Lohmeier	Nancy & Richard Kaster	6 f	1:09.05	$66,060	
1998	Punch Line	8	Jorge Chavez	William H. Turner Jr.	Althea D. Richards	6 f	1:10.07	$66,840	
1997	Royal Haven	5	Richard Migliore	Gasper Moschera	Barbara Davis	6 f	1:10.68	$65,820	
1996	Victor Avenue	3	Jorge Chavez	Dale Romans	Greg James	6 f	1:09.24	$67,440	
1995	Jess C's Whirl	5	Jorge Chavez	John H. Forbes	Ted & Larry Oleck	6 f	1:09.87	$66,180	
1994	Chimes Band	3	Jerry D. Bailey	D. Wayne Lukas	Fares Farms (Issam Michael Fares)	6 f	1:11.37	$65,940	
1993	Fly So Free	5	Jerry D. Bailey	Flint S. Schulhofer	Tommy Valando	6 f	1:09.41	$72,360	
1992	Salt Lake	3	Mike E. Smith	D. Wayne Lukas	William T. Young	6 f	1:09.07	$68,520	
1991	Senor Speedy	4	Jorge Chavez	Alfredo Callejas	Robert Perez	6 f	1:08.62	$70,920	
1990	Carson City	3	Jerry D. Bailey	D. Wayne Lukas	William T. Young	6 f	1:09.80	$51,030	
1989	Sewickley	4	Randy Romero	Flint S. Schulhofer	Robert S. Evans	6 f	1:09.60	$68,880	
1988	Parlay Me	3	Randy Romero	James E. Picou	Marshall E. Sigel	6 f	1:09.60	$69,000	
1987	Purple Mountain	5	Richard Migliore	Woodrow Sedlacek	Jacques Wimpfheimer	6 f	1:08.80	$85,500	
1986	Funistrada	3	Robbie Davis	Jan H. Nerud	John A. Nerud	6 f	1:09.40	$68,640	
1985	Mt. Livermore	4	Jorge Velásquez	D. Wayne Lukas	Lloyd R. French Jr.	6 f	1:10.60	$89,460	
1984	Mamaison	4	Chris McCarron	Richard Mandella	Harold P. Oliver	6 f	1:10.20	$77,040	
1983	Chas Conerly	3	Jimmy Miranda	H. Allen Jerkens	Hobeau Farm	6 f	1:10.40	$50,670	
1982	Gold Beauty	3	Don Brumfield	William D. Curtis	Georgia E. Hoffman	6 f	1:09.20	$50,940	
1981	Piedmont Pete	5	Kenny Black	Ron Alfano	Mel Hewitt	6 f	1:10.40	$50,490	
1980	King's Fashion	5	Jean-Luc Samyn	H. Allen Jerkens	Bohemia Stable	6 f	1:10.60	$51,120	
1979	Whatsyourpleasure	6	Ángel Cordero Jr.	John W. Russell	Murty Farm (Duane & Wayne Murty)	6 f	1:09.60	$49,095	
1978	What A Summer	5	Ángel Cordero Jr.	LeRoy Jolley	Diana M. Firestone	6 f	1:09.40	$48,195	
1977	What A Summer	4	Jacinto Vásquez	LeRoy Jolley	Diana M. Firestone	6 f	1:10.00	$50,490	
1976-1	Relent	5	Ruben Hernandez	Sidney Watters Jr.	Stephen C. Clark	6 f	1:09.80	$39,105	
1976-2	Honorable Miss	6	Bill Shoemaker	Frank Y. Whiteley Jr.	Pen-Y-Bryn Farm	6 f	1:10.00	$39,780	
1975	Honorable Miss	5	Jacinto Vásquez	Frank Y. Whiteley Jr.	Pen-Y-Bryn Farm	6 f	1:09.80	$54,720	
1974	Piamem	4	Miguel A. Rivera	Lazaro S. Barrera	Miguel Alfonzo	6 f	1:10.40	$22,575	
1973	King's Bishop	4	Eddie Maple	H. Allen Jerkens	Bohemia Stable	6 f	1:09.40	$17,310	
1972	Chou Croute	4	John L. Rotz	Robert G. Dunham	Emmanuel Victor Benjamin III	6 f	1:10.00	$17,340	
1971	Shut Eye	5	Ángel Cordero Jr.	Jack M. Bradley	Kev-Hill Stable	6 f	1:10.80	$20,280	
1970	Ta Wee	4	John L. Rotz	Flint S. Schulhofer	Tartan Stable	6 f	1:10.40	$18,395	
1969	Ta Wee	3	John L. Rotz	Flint S. Schulhofer	Tartan Stable	6 f	1:10.20	$18,622	
1968	More Scents	4	Ángel Cordero Jr.	Philip G. Johnson	Meadowhill (Morton Rosenthal & Alfred Green)	6 f	1:11.80	$18,460	
1967	Indulto	4	John L. Rotz	Max Hirsch	Jane Greer	6 f	1:12.60	$18,200	
1966	Impressive III	3	Kenneth Knapp	Edward A. Neloy	Little M Farm (syndicate, John R. Murrell, manager)	6 f	1:10.40	$18,752	
1965	Pack Trip	5	Manuel Ycaza	John A. Nerud	Joseph M. Roebling	6 f	1:13.80	$18,167	
1964	Delta Judge	4	John L. Rotz	Clyde Troutt	Ada L. Rice	6 f	1:10.60	$18,005	
1963	Accordant	3	Paul Kallai	Joseph Kulina	Colonial Farm (John & Sam Fieramosca)	6 f	1:10.20	$14,788	
1962	Be On Time	3	Pete D. Anderson	Eddie Hayward	Circle M Farm (Edward S. Moore)	6 f	1:09.40	$18,752	
1961	Smashing Gail	3	Bobby Ussery	Nicholas Combest	Edith Baily Dent	6 f	1:10.00	$18,655	
1960	Four Lane	3	Sam Boulmetis Sr.	Thomas M. Waller	William Ewing	6 f	1:09.00	$18,192	
1959	Mystic II	5	Michael A. Sorrentino	Morris H. Dixon	C. Mahlon Kline	6 f	1:11.00	$18,095	
1958	Bull Strength	4	Eddie Arcaro	Jack J. Carrara	Brookfield Farm	6 f	1:10.00	$19,135	
1957	Itobe	4	Eldon Nelson	Edward I. Kelly Sr.	Brookfield Farm	6 f	1:09.40	$20,600	
1956	Impromptu	4	Conn McCreary	Edward I. Kelly Sr.	Brookfield Farm	6 f	1:09.00	$21,550	
1955	Sailor II	3	Hedley Woodhouse	Preston M. Burch	Brookmeade Stable	6 f	1:10.00	$17,050	
1954	Pet Bully	6	Bill Hartack	Thomas Joseph Kelly	Ada L. Rice	6 f	1:11.20	$17,800	
1953	Kaster	4	Augustine Catalano	Morris H. Dixon	C. Mahlon Kline	6 f	1:09.80	$16,600	
1952	Hitex	3	Eddie Arcaro	James P. Conway	Florence D. Whitaker	6 f	1:08.40	$17,300	
1951	Guillotine	4	Ted Atkinson	John M. Gaver Sr.	Greentree Stable	6 f	1:09.00	$18,700	
1950	Arise	4	Douglas Dodson	James C. Bentley	Addison Stable (Harry Addison, Sr. & Mrs. Jack Addison)	6 f	1:08.80	$17,800	
1949	Royal Governor	5	Eric Guerin	James E. Ryan	Esther D. du Pont	6 f	1:12.00	$17,150	
1948	First Flight	4	Eddie Arcaro	Sylvester E. Veitch	C. V. Whitney	6 f	1:08.60	$22,650	
1947	Rippey	4	Ovie Scurlock	Willie Booth	William G. Helis Sr.	6 f	1:10.80	$21,300	
1946	Cassis	7	Basil James	Preston M. Burch	W. Deering Howe	6 f	1:08.80	$16,750	
1945	True North	5	Ted Atkinson	Preston M. Burch	Howe Stable (W. Deering Howe)	6 f	1:08.80	$7,370	
1944	Ariel Lad	5	Eddie Arcaro	J. Thomas Taylor	Selznick Stable	6 f	1:08.40	$7,285	
1943	Cassis	4	Ted Atkinson	Preston M. Burch	Howe Stable (W. Deering Howe)	6 f	1:11.20	$6,725	
1942	Imperatrice	4	Conn McCreary	George M. Odom	William H. La Boyteaux	6 f	1:10.20	$5,925	
1941	Roman	4	Don Meade	Peter W. Coyne	Joseph E. Widener	6 f	1:10.00	$4,500	
1940	T. M. Dorsett	4	Raymond Workman	John B. Theall	Joe W. Brown	6 f	1:11.40	$4,500	
1939	Rough Time	5	Fred Faust	J. Yancy Christmas	J. Yancy Christmas	6 f	1:09.40	$6,100	
1938	The Fighter	5	Raymond Workman	Edward L. Snyder	William F. Morgan	6 f	1:10.00	$4,750	
1937	Preeminent	5	Eddie Arcaro	Duval A. Headley	Hal Price Headley	6 f	1:10.80	$2,975	
1936	Miss Merriment	5	Raymond Workman	J. P. "Sammy" Smith	Victor Emanuel	6 f	1:09.60	$3,200	
1935	Sation	5	Jim Hunter	Winbert F. Mulholland	George D. Widener Jr.	6 f	1:10.20	$3,075	
1934	Miss Merriment	3	Earl Steffen	J. P. "Sammy" Smith	Dorwood Stable (Victor Emanuel)	6 f	1:10.40	$2,750	
1933	Microphone	4	Silvio Coucci	Phillip M. Walker	Sage Stable (Harry W. Sage)	6 f	1:11.00	$1,845	
1932	Larranga	3	Raymond Workman	Edward J. Bennett	Anall Stable (Allan A. Ryan)	6 f	1:10.40	$2,450	
1931	Mr. Sponge	4	Mack Garner	Henry E. McDaniel	Joseph E. Widener	6 f	1:11.60	$3,025	
1930	Balko	5	John Bejshak	Joseph H. Stotler	Sagamore Stable (Margaret Emerson)	6 f	1:09.40	$3,375	
1929	Osmand	5	Willie Garner	Peter W. Coyne	Joseph E. Widener	6 f	1:10.60	$3,600	
1928	Finite	3	Frank S. Moon	A. Jack Joyner	George D. Widener Jr.	6 f	1:12.60	$3,700	
1927	Happy Argo	4	Steve O'Donnell	Max Hirsch	Kershaw Stable (Bernard M. Baruch)	6 f	1:11.20	$4,050	
1926	Powhatan	3	John Maiben	Thomas J. Healey	Walter J. Salmon Sr.	6 f	1:12.00	$3,800	
1925	Superlette	3	Laverne Fator	Sam Hildreth	Rancocas Stable	6 f	1:12.40	$3,400	
1924	Worthmore	3	Steve O'Donnell	John S. Ward	John S. Ward	6 f	1:11.60	$4,225	
1923	Fair Phantom	4	Earl Sande	C. Kay Spence	Audley Farm	6 f	1:10.40	$3,275	
1922	Careful	4	James Butwell	Thomas J. Healey	Walter J. Salmon Sr.	6 f	1:12.60	$3,300	
1921	Crocus	3	Frank Coltiletti	James G. Rowe Sr.	Harry Payne Whitney	6 f	1:11.40	$2,725	
1920	Lion d'Or	4	Earl Sande	H. Guy Bedwell	J. K. L. Ross	6 f	1:09.80	$3,100	
1919	Naturalist	5	Charles Fairbrother	Thomas Welsh	Joseph E. Widener	6 f	1:11.60	$2,900	
1918	Hollister *	4	Johnny Loftus	Walter B. Jennings	A. Kingsley Macomber	6 f	1:10.00	$2,100	
1917	Ima Frank	4	John McTaggart	George Ziegler	Beverwyck Stable (Frank J. Nolan)	6 f	1:11.80	$1,410	
1916	Mont d'Or	5	Joe Notter	Thomas Welsh	L. Wood	6 f	1:13.20	$1,230	
1915	Harmonicon	5	Joe Notter	James G. Rowe Sr.	Lewis S. Thompson	6 f	1:10.80	$1,195	
1914	Comely	2	Joe McCahey	Richard C. Benson	James Butler	6 f	1:12.00	$1,275	

* In 1918, Fairy Wand finished first, but was disqualified.
