= Great American Stakes =

- Class: Discontinued stakes
- Location: Belmont Park, Elmont NY
- Inaugurated: 1889–1992
- Race type: Thoroughbred – Flat racing

Race information
- Distance: 5½ furlongs
- Surface: Dirt
- Track: left-handed
- Qualification: Two-years-old

The Great American Stakes is a discontinued American Thoroughbred horse race last run annually at Belmont Park in Elmont, New York. Raced on dirt and open to two-year-old horses only, it was last run at a distance of five and a half furlongs.

== Historical notes ==
The race was inaugurated as a five furlong event at the Gravesend Race Track at Gravesend on Coney Island, New York. Passage off the Hart–Agnew Law that banned parimutuel betting. Enacted by the Republican controlled New York Legislature under Governor Charles Evans Hughes, left owners of Gravesend Race Track and other racing facilities in New York State struggling to stay in business without income from betting. Further restrictive legislation was passed by the New York Legislature in 1910 which deepened the financial crisis for track operators and led to a complete shut down of racing across the state during 1911 and 1912. When a February 21, 1913 ruling by the New York Supreme Court, Appellate Division saw horse racing return in 1913, the Great American Stakes was revived and over the years would be hosted by three different New York racetracks. While at Aqueduct Racetrack, the Great American Stakes earned Grade 3 status in 1973 and 1974.

=== Success and failure of some Hall of Fame greats ===
While at Gravesend, the Great American Stakes attracted many of the top two-year-olds of the day including 1893 winner and future U.S. Racing Hall of Fame inductee Domino.

Over the years there were a number of upsets in the running of the Great American Stakes. In 1936, Fairy Hill defeated War Admiral and in 1977, in what became one of the great rivalries in the history of American racing, Alydar easily beat Affirmed.

Chronology of racetracks:

- Gravesend Race Track (1889–1910)
- Belmont Park (1913, 1957, 1975–1982)
- Aqueduct Racetrack (1914–1955, 1960–1974)
- Jamaica Race Course (1956, 1958–1959)

== Records ==
Speed record:

- 5 furlongs: 1:00.20 – Snark (1935)
- 5 1/2 furlongs: 1:03.80 – Laus' Cause (1982)
- 6 furlongs: 1:12.00 – Getthere Jack (1955)

Most wins by a jockey:

- 5- Eddie Arcaro (1937, 1941, 1949, 1956, 1958)

Most wins by a trainer:

- 4 – James G. Rowe Sr. (1889, 1902, 1921, 1926)
- 4 – James E. Fitzsimmons (1927, 1933, 1934, 1935)

Most wins by an owner:

- 4- Wheatley Stable (1927, 1933, 1934, 1935)
- 4- Harry Payne Whitney (1905, 1921, 1922, 1926)

== Winners ==
Year	Winner	Age	Jockey	Trainer	Owner	Dist. (Furlongs)	Time
1982	Laus' Cause	2	Jorge Tejeira	Reynaldo H. Nobles	Robert E. Brennan	5.5 F	1:03.80
1981	Full Venture	2	Donald Brumfield	Benjamin W. Perkins Jr.	Elkcam Stables (Mackle brothers)	5.5 F	1:04.60
1979	J. P. Brother	2	Joe Imparato	John P. Campo	John P. Campo	5.5 F	1:05.60
1978	Jose Binn	2	Ángel Cordero Jr.	Jose A. Martin	Morton Binn	5.5 F	1:04.00
1977	Alydar	2	Eddie Maple	John M. Veitch	Calumet Farm	5.5 F	1:03.60
1976	Banquet Table	2	Jean Cruguet	George T. Poole Jr.	Cornelius Vanderbilt Whitney	5.5 F	1:04.60
1975	Great Contractor	2	Laffit Pincay Jr.	Roger Laurin	Howard P. Wilson	8.5 F	1:47.00
1974	I'm In Business	2	Vincent Bracciale Jr.	James J. Toner	Brookfield Farm	8.5 F	1:45.00
1973	Cannonade	2	Pete Anderson	Woody Stephens	John M. Olin	8 F	1:34.60
1972	Decimator	2	Ron Turcotte	John P. Campo	Buckland Farm	8 F	1:37.00
1971	Chevron Flight	2	Martin Fromin	Thomas H. Heard Jr.	Caesar P. Kimmel	5.5 F	1:04.40
1970	Three Martinis	2	Rudy Turcotte	Roger Laurin	Edward Sawyer	5.5 F	1:04.20
1969	Hagley	2	Manuel Ycaza	J. Woods Garth	Hickory Tree Stable	5.5 F	1:04.20
1968	Prevailing	2	Ray Broussard	Warren A. Croll Jr.	Aisco Stable	5.5 F	1:03.80
1967	Subpet	2	Ray Broussard	Warren A. Croll Jr.	Thomas Leclair	5.5 F	1:04.00
1966	Native Prince	2	Ray Broussard	Raymond F. Metcalf	Edward R. Scharps	5.5 F	1:04.40
1965	Our Michael	2	Johnny Sellers	Jimmy Pitt	Edgehill Farm (Leonard & Morris Fruchtman)	5.5 F	1:03.60
1964	Time Tested	2	Braulio Baeza	Bill Winfrey	Ogden Mills Phipps	5.5 F	1:05.00
1963	Raise A Native	2	Manuel Ycaza	Burley Parke	Louis Wolfson	5.5 F	1:02.60
1962	Ahoy	2	Herb Hinojosa	J. Bowes Bond	Leon Levy	5.5 F	1:04.60
1961	Sir Gaylord	2	Ismael Valenzuela	Casey Hayes	Christopher Chenery	5.5 F	1:04.00
1960	Hail To Reason	2	Bobby Ussery	Hirsch Jacobs	Patrice Jacobs	5.5 F	1:05.00
1959	Bally Ache	2	Sam Boulmetis Sr.	Jimmy Pitt	Edgehill Farm (Leonard & Morris Fruchtman)	5.5 F	1:04.40
1958	First Landing	2	Eddie Arcaro	Casey Hayes	Christopher Chenery	5.5 F	1:04.00
1957	Li'L Fella	2	Bobby Ussery	J. Bowes Bond	Jaclyn Stable (William S. Paley & Leon Levy)	5.5 F	1:05.40
1956	King Hairan	2	Eddie Arcaro	Leonard H. Hunt	Leo Edwards & Harry B. Massey	5.5 F	1:04.40
1955	Getthere Jack	2	Hedley Woodhouse	John J. Weipert Jr.	Lily-Ann Stable	6 F	1:12.00
1954	Royal Coinage	2	Jack Skelly	Anthony J. Pupino	Clearwater Stable (F.L. Leatherbury & E.A. Roberts)	6 F	1:12.20
1953	Fisherman	2	Claude Erickson	Sylvester Veitch	Cornelius Vanderbilt Whitney	6 F	1:12.20
1952	Bradley	2	Ted Atkinson	William Post	Hope Iselin	6 F	1:11.20
1951	Cousin	2	Nick Combest	Bill Winfrey	Alfred G. Vanderbilt II	6 F	1:13.00
1950	Silver Wings	2	Glenn Laswell	Tom Smith	Maine Chance Farm	6 F	1:10.80
1949	Navy Chief	2	Eddie Arcaro	Albert E. "Bert" Alexandra	E. P. Taylor	6 F	1:11.20
1948	Prince Quest	2	Charles Leblanc	James Conway	Ben F. Whitaker	6 F	1:12.40
1947	Star Bout	2	Ted Atkinson	John M. Gaver Sr.	Greentree Stable	6 F	1:11.00
1946	I Will	2	Eric Guerin	George M. Odom	Jay Paley	6 F	1:13.20
1945	Mist o' Gold	2	Wayne D. Wright	Don Cameron	Vera S. Bragg	6 F	1:12.80
1944	Fighting Don	2	Ferrill Zufelt	William O. Hicks	Gertrude Donovan	6 F	1:11.80
1943	Lucky Draw	2	Conn McCreary	Bert Mulholland	George D. Widener Jr.	6 F	1:12.00
1942	Breezing Home	2	Vincent Nodarse	Matthew P. Brady	William Ziegler Jr.	6 F	1:11.60
1941	Requested	2	Eddie Arcaro	J. H. "Blackie" McCoole	Ben F. Whitaker	6 F	1:12.40
1940	Omission	2	Don Meade	J. P. "Sammy" Smith	Victor Emanuel	6 F	1:13.00
1939	Johnnie J.	2	Sam Renick	Edward J. Legere	Carrie Hardin	6 F	1:11.80
1938	El Chico	2	Nick Wall	Matthew P. Brady	William Ziegler Jr.	6 F	1:13.20
1937	Maetall	2	Eddie Arcaro	George E. Phillips	Maemere Farm Stable (Dewitt Page)	6 F	1:13.00
1936	Fairy Hill	2	Maurice Peters	Richard E. Handlen	Foxcatcher Farm	6 F	1:12.60
1935	Snark	2	Francis Horn	James E. Fitzsimmons	Wheatley Stable	5 F	1:00.20
1934	Dasher	2	Charles Kurtsinger	James E. Fitzsimmons	Wheatley Stable	5 F	1:00.40
1933	Slapdash	2	Hank Mills	James E. Fitzsimmons	Wheatley Stable	5 F	1:01.20
1932	Puchero	2	Buddy Hanford	Clyde Phillips	William Ziegler Jr.	5 F	1:00.40
1931	Osculator	2	Pete Walls	Bennett W. Creech	William R. Coe	5 F	1:00.20
1930	Equipoise	2	Raymond Workman	Fred Hopkins	Cornelius Vanderbilt Whitney	5 F	1:00.20
1929	Grattan	2	Earl Steffen	Sam Hildreth	Rancocas Stable	5 F	1:00.00
1928	Soul of Honor	2	George Fields	Robert A. Smith	Audley Farm Stable	5 F	0:59.40
1927	Dice	2	Danny McAuliffe	James E. Fitzsimmons	Wheatley Stable	5 F	1:00.00
1926	Pantella	2	Linus McAtee	James G. Rowe Sr.	Harry Payne Whitney	5 F	0:59.80
1925	Navigator	2	Earl Sande	Clyde Phillips	Greentree Stable	5 F	1:00.00
1924	Swope	2	Clarence Turner	Albert B. "Alex" Gordon	Bud Fisher	5 F	1:00.40
1923	Rustic	2	George W. Carroll	Robert J. Walden	Alfred Hennen Morris	5 F	0:58.80
1922	Goshawk	2	Lewis Morris	Fred Hopkins	Harry Payne Whitney	5 F	0:59.20
1921	Broomster	2	Leslie Penman	James G. Rowe Sr.	Harry Payne Whitney	5 F	0:59.60
1920	Touch Me Not	2	Clarence Kummer	William R. Midgley	Greentree Stable	5 F	0:59.20
1919	Bonnie Mary	2	Willie Knapp	William Hogan	Philip A. Clark	5 F	0:58.40
1918	Dunboyne	2	George Byrne	William Hogan	Philip A. Clark	5 F	0:59.60
1917	Sun Briar	2	Willie Knapp	Henry McDaniel	Willis Sharpe Kilmer	5 F	1:01.40
1916	Campfire	2	John McTaggart	T. J. Healey	Richard T. Wilson Jr.	5 F	1:00.00
1915	Ormesdale	2	Joe McCahey	T. J. Healey	Richard T. Wilson Jr.	5 F	1:01.80
1914	Lady Barbary	2	Clarence Turner	Richard F. Carman	Richard F. Carman	5 F	1:01.60
1913	Gainer	2	John Wilson	H. I. Marshall	James L. Holland	5 F	0:59.60
1912	No races held due to the Hart–Agnew Law.						
1911	No races held due to the Hart–Agnew Law.						
1910	Babbler	2	Eddie Dugan	John Whalen	August Belmont Jr.	5 F	1:02.20
1909	Starbottle	2	Eddie Dugan	A. Jack Joyner	August Belmont Jr.	5 F	1:02.80
1908	Sir Martin	2	James Lee	John E. Madden	John E. Madden	5 F	1:00.60
1907	Cohort	2	R. Lowe	William H. Karrick	Oneck Stable	5 F	1:00.00
1906	Water Pearl	2	Joseph A. Jones	A. Jack Joyner	Sydney Paget	5 F	1:01.00
1905	Burgomaster	2	Lucien Lyne	John W. Rogers	Harry Payne Whitney	5 F	1:01.00
1904	Song and Wine	2	Frank O'Neill	Fred Burlew	Newton Bennington	5 F	1:02.60
1903	Broomstick	2	George M. Odom	Peter Wimmer	Samuel S. Brown	5 F	1:00.00
1902	Dalesman	2	Willie Shaw	James G. Rowe Sr.	J. R. & F. P. Keene	5 F	1:00.00
1901	Blue Girl	2	Tommy Burns	John E. Madden	John E. Madden	5 F	1:02.80
1900	Prince Charles	2	Nash Turner	John W. Rogers	William C. Whitney	5 F	1:02.20
1899	Vulcain	2	Nash Turner	H. Eugene Leigh	H. Eugene Leigh	5 F	1:02.60
1898	Jean Bereaud	2	Tod Sloan	Sam Hildreth	David Gideon & John Daly	5 F	1:01.75
1897	Previous	2	Tod Sloan	Hardy Campbell Jr.	Michael F. Dwyer	5 F	1:01.75
1896	George Kessler	2	Fred Taral	Matthew Byrnes	Matthew Byrnes	5 F	1:02.25
1895	Applegate	2	John J. McCafferty	John J. McCafferty	John J. McCafferty	5 F	1:02.00
1894	Waltzer	2	Henry Griffin	John J. Hyland	David Gideon & John Daly	5 F	1:04.25
1893	Domino	2	Fred Taral	William Lakeland	J. R. & F. P. Keene	5 F	1:01.75
1892	Sir Walter	2	Edward Garrison	Walter C. Rollins	Oneck Stable	5 F	1:01.25
1891	St. Florian	2	George Taylor	R. Wyndham Walden	John A. & Alfred H. Morris	5 F	1:03.50
1890	Russell	2	Edward Garrison	R. Wyndham Walden	John A. & Alfred H. Morris	5 F	1:02.00
1889	St. Carlo	2	Edward Garrison	James G. Rowe Sr.	August Belmont	5 F	1:02.25
