= Laureate Stakes =

- Class: Discontinued stakes
- Location: Morris Park Racecourse (1896–1904); Westchester County, New York; Belmont Park (1905–1910, 1914); Elmont, New York
- Inaugurated: 1896–1913
- Race type: Thoroughbred – Flat racing

Race information
- Distance: 5.5 furlongs (0.69 mi)
- Surface: Dirt
- Track: left-handed
- Qualification: Two-year-olds

The Laureate Stakes was a race for two-year-old Thoroughbred horses run at Morris Park Racecourse in Westchester County, New York from inception in 1896 through 1904. The racecourse was located in a part of Westchester County, New York that was annexed into the Bronx in 1895 and later developed as the neighborhood of Morris Park.

Financial difficulties saw Morris Park cease operations and the race was transferred to the newly opened Belmont Park in Elmont, New York where it was run from 1905 through 1910 and for a final time in 1914. The Laureate was run on dirt and for all but its final edition at 5½ furlongs was contested at a distance of five furlongs.

== The 1911–1912 statewide shutdown of horse racing ==
On June 11, 1908, the Republican-controlled New York Legislature under Governor Charles Evans Hughes passed the Hart–Agnew anti-betting legislation with penalties allowing for fines and up to a year in prison.

In spite of strong opposition by prominent owners such as August Belmont, Jr. and Harry Payne Whitney, reform legislators were not happy when they learned that betting was still going on at racetracks between individuals and they had further restrictive legislation passed by the New York Legislature in 1910 that made it possible for racetrack owners and members of its board of directors to be fined and imprisoned if anyone was found betting, even privately, anywhere on their premises. After a 1911 amendment to the law to limit the liability of owners and directors was defeated, every racetrack in New York State shut down. As a result, the Laureate Stakes was not run in 1911 and 1912.

== Records ==
Speed record: (5 furlongs)

- 0:58.80 – Song and Wine (1904)

Most wins by a jockey:

- 2 – Tod Sloan (1897–1898)
- 2 – George M. Odom (1900, 1903)
- 2 – Joe Notter (1908, 1914)

Most wins by a trainer:

- 3- James G. Rowe Sr. (1896, 1907, 1908)

Most wins by an owner:

- 2- August Belmont Jr. (1906, 1910)
- 2- James R. Keene (1907, 1908)

== Winners ==
| Year | Winner | Age | Jockey | Trainer | Owner | Dist. (Furlongs) | Time | Win$ |
|---|---|---|---|---|---|---|---|---|
| 1914 | Comely | 2 | Joe Notter | Richard C. Benson | James Butler | 5.5 F | 1:07.00 | $6,025 |
| 1913 | Race not held | | | | | | | |
| 1912 | No races held due to the Hart–Agnew Law. | | | | | | | |
| 1911 | No races held due to the Hart–Agnew Law. | | | | | | | |
| 1910 | Babbler | 2 | Eddie Dugan | John Whalen | August Belmont Jr. | 5 F | 1:00.40 | $2,375 |
| 1909 | Waldo | 2 | Dave Nicol | Raleigh Colston Jr. | Charles L. Harrison | 5 F | 1:01.00 | $1,925 |
| 1908 | Melisande | 2 | Joe Notter | James G. Rowe Sr. | James R. Keene | 5 F | 0:59.60 | $2,885 |
| 1907 | Frizette | 2 | Walter Miller | James G. Rowe Sr. | James R. Keene | 5 F | 0:00.00* | $3,425 |
| 1906 | Okenite | 2 | Herman Radtke | John Whalen | August Belmont Jr. | 5 F | 0:59.00 | $2,975 |
| 1905 | Penrhyn | 2 | Willie Shaw | Charles H. Hughes | Henry M. Zeigler | 5 F | 1:01.00 | $2,460 |
| 1904 | Song and Wine | 2 | Arthur Redfern | Fred Burlew | Newton Bennington | 5 F | 0:58.80 | $2,395 |
| 1903 | Boxwood | 2 | George M. Odom | Green B. Morris | Green B. Morris | 5 F | 0:59.75 | $2,850 |
| 1902 | Charles Elwood | 2 | Otto Wonderly | Charles Littlefield Jr. | James B. A. Haggin | 5 F | 0:59.25 | $2,675 |
| 1901 | Oom Paul | 2 | Milton Henry | William Heuston | Jacob Worth | 5 F | 1:01.00 | $1,805 |
| 1900 | Bonnibert | 2 | George M. Odom | Thomas Welsh | Fleischmann sons | 5 F | 0:59.80 | $2,015 |
| 1899 | Prince of Melbourne | 2 | Jesse Everett | Charles T. Patterson | Charles T. Patterson | 5 F | 0:59.80 | $2,150 |
| 1898 | Dr. Eichberg | 2 | Tod Sloan | Amos Turney | Turney Bros. | 5 F | 0:59.75 | $2,005 |
| 1897 | Frohman | 2 | Tod Sloan | David Gideon | David Gideon | 5 F | 1:00.00 | $2,250 |
| 1896 | Bastion | 2 | Alonzo Clayton | James G. Rowe Sr. | Brookdale Farm Stable | 5 F | 1:03.00 | $2,500 |

- no time taken
