= Raymond Workman =

American jockey (1909–1966)

Personal information
- Born: May 24, 1909 Hoboken, New Jersey, United States
- Died: August 21, 1966 (aged 57)
- Occupation: Jockey

Horse racing career
- Sport: Horse racing
- Career wins: 1,169

Major racing wins
- Huron Handicap (1927); Spinaway Stakes (1927, 1931, 1939); Ladies Handicap (1928, 1932); Withers Stakes (1928, 1930); Futurity Stakes (1929, 1931); Hopeful Stakes (1929, 1935); Great American Stakes (1930); Fashion Stakes (1930, 1934); Juvenile Stakes (1930); Keene Memorial Stakes (1930, 1932); National Stallion Stakes (1930, 1932, 1937, 1939); Victoria Stakes (1930); Pimlico Futurity (1930, 1931); Whitney Handicap (1930, 1932); Yonkers Handicap (1930); Brooklyn Handicap (1931); Empire City Handicap (1931); Fleetwing Handicap (1931); Gazelle Stakes (1931); Matron Stakes (1931); Metropolitan Handicap (1931, 1932, 1933); Saratoga Special Stakes (1931, 1935, 1936); Acorn Stakes (1932); Alabama Stakes (1932); Arlington Oaks (1932); Arlington Lassie Stakes (1932, 1934, 1939); Coaching Club American Oaks (1932); Fall Highweight Handicap (1932, 1936, 1938, 1940); Havre de Grace Cup Handicap (1932); Jerome Handicap (1932); Manhattan Handicap (1932, 1933); Sanford Stakes (1932); Suburban Handicap (1932, 1933); Stars and Stripes Handicap (1932); Toboggan Handicap (1932); Wilson Stakes (1932, 1933); Arlington Handicap (1933); Hawthorne Gold Cup Handicap (1933); Philadelphia Handicap (1933, 1934); Saratoga Cup (1933); Bay Shore Handicap (1935); San Vicente Stakes (1935); Wood Memorial Stakes (1935); Massachusetts Handicap (1936); Kentucky Oaks (1936); Carter Handicap (1938); Chesapeake Stakes (1938); Santa Barbara Handicap (1938); San Felipe Stakes (1938); Astoria Stakes (1939); Demoiselle Stakes (1939) American Classic Race wins: Preakness Stakes (1928)

Racing awards
- United States Champion Jockey by earnings (1930, 1932); United States Champion Jockey by wins (1930)

Honors
- U.S. Racing Hall of Fame (1956); Washington Hall of Stars

Significant horses
- Discovery, Equipoise, Ladysman, Menow, Questionnaire, Seabiscuit, Top Flight, Victorian, Whichone, Whiskery

Raymond "Sonny" Workman (May 24, 1909 – August 21, 1966) was an American National Champion and Hall of Fame jockey in Thoroughbred horse racing. During his fifteen years as a professional rider from 1926 through 1940, he won an exceptional twenty percent of his starts.

Born in Hoboken, New Jersey, Raymond Workman's mother was a native of Washington, D.C., and after her husband's death she and the children returned to live there. Workman studied to be a member of the clergy before deciding to embark upon a career as a jockey. He began riding at age seventeen at racetracks in Ohio where he quickly demonstrated a natural riding ability combined with a strong desire to excel. Widely known by the nickname "Sonny," his competitiveness was such that the Chicago Tribune called him a "riding demon" and the New York Times called him a "bulldog in silks." His abilities quickly reached a level that in just his second year of racing he signed a contract to go to New York City to ride for one of the country's preeminent owners, Harry Payne Whitney. He was also the regular rider for Cornelius Vanderbilt Whitney's stables and in 1932 and 1933 he and Whitney's handicap runner, Equipoise, were the idols of New York racing.

In 1930, Sonny Workman was both the United States Champion Jockey by earnings and Champion by total wins while achieving it with a 27% rate of wins to mounts. In 1932 he was the earnings leader a second time.

On January 21, 1930, he was married to Marion Elizabeth Burch of Washington, D.C.

== Triple Crown races ==
During his career, Sonny Workman competed in four Kentucky Derbys with his best result two fourth-place finishes. He made eight starts in the Preakness Stakes, winning it in his first try in 1928 at age eighteen. From his other Preakness mounts, his best results were a second with Ladysman in 1933 and a third aboard Menow in 1938. He rode in the Belmont Stakes on eight occasions, finishing second five times. He was runner-up with Whichone in 1930, Osculator in 1932, Nimbus in 1933, Firethorn in 1935, and Belay in 1939.

=== 1928 Preakness Stakes ===
Not entered in that year's Kentucky Derby, Harry Whitney's colt, Victorian with Sonny Workman aboard, won the May 11, 1928, Preakness Stakes at Pimlico Race Course. Making his debut in the Belmont Stakes, Workman rode Victorian to a fifth-place finish.

In 1937, Sonny Workman signed to ride for Alfred Gwynne Vanderbilt Jr. However, for years he had battled weight gain and his exceptional riding skills were increasingly being hampered by the need for constant dieting. Those weight problems led to his early retirement in 1940, a year in which he became a founding vice-president of the Jockeys' Guild. In 1941 he returned to live in Washington, D.C., where he managed his real estate investments.

In 1956, Raymond Workman was inducted in the United States' National Museum of Racing and Hall of Fame. He died at Georgetown University Hospital in 1966 at age fifty-seven. His second wife and widow, Louise Bryant Workman, died on August 9, 1997.
