= Dice (horse) =

American-bred Thoroughbred racehorse

- Sire: Dominant
- Grandsire: Delhi
- Dam: Frumpery
- Damsire: Chicle
- Sex: Stallion
- Foaled: 1925
- Country: United States
- Colour: Bay
- Breeder: Harry Payne Whitney
- Owner: Wheatley Stable
- Trainer: Sunny Jim Fitzsimmons
- Record: 5: 5-0-0
- Earnings: $42,625

Major wins
- Hudson Stakes (1927); Great American Stakes (1927); Juvenile Stakes (1927); Keene Memorial Stakes (1927)

Awards
- American Co-Champion Two-Year-Old Colt (1927)

Dice (1925–1927) was an American Champion Thoroughbred racehorse. Bred by Harry Payne Whitney, he was purchased as a yearling by Gladys Mills Phipps who raced him under her Wheatley Stable banner.

After making a winning debut in an overnight race at Jamaica Race Course in New York, Dice went on to win four straight important races for his age group. After a one-mile workout at Saratoga Race Course in preparation for the following weeks Saratoga Special Stakes, Dice suddenly began bleeding from the nostrils and died.

Dice was retrospectively voted co-winner with Reigh Count as the American Champion Two-Year-Old Colt for 1927, an award won by his sire Dominant in 1915.

== See also ==
- List of leading Thoroughbred racehorses
