= Oakdale Handicap =

- Class: Discontinued stakes
- Location: Aqueduct Racetrack, Ozone Park, New York, United States
- Inaugurated: 1902
- Race type: Thoroughbred – Flat racing

Race information
- Distance: 6 furlongs (3/4 mile)
- Surface: Dirt
- Track: left-handed
- Qualification: Two-year-olds

The Oakdale Handicap was an American Thoroughbred horse race run in twenty-four years between 1902 and 1932 at Aqueduct Racetrack in Ozone Park, New York. A six furlong event run in the fall, it was open for two-year-old horses of either sex. Fillies won it in 1905, 1924, and 1927.

== Historical notes ==
First run on November 7, 1902, the distance for that year only was set at seven furlongs. It was won by Lyman Hay, a colt owned by Charles Ellison and trained by John Mayberry. The owner and trainer had hoped Lyman Hay might be a "Derby" horse for 1903. He was not, but as luck would have it they had Judge Himes in their stable with which they would win the 1903 Kentucky Derby.

=== Hart-Agnew Law interruption ===
The 1908 passage of the Hart-Agnew anti-betting legislation by the New York Legislature under Republican Governor Charles Evans Hughes led to a state-wide shutdown of racing in 1911 and 1912. A February 21, 1913 ruling by the New York Supreme Court, Appellate Division saw horse racing return in 1913. However, the Oakdale Handicap was not restored to the track's schedule until 1917.

=== Grey Lag's loss ===
The biggest upset in the history of the Oakdale occurred in 1920 when J. D. Mooney rode Knobbie to victory over Grey Lag. A recent purchase by trainer Sam Hildreth for the Rancocas Stable, Grey Lag's career would see him earn four National Champion titles, including American Horse of the Year, and induction into the U.S. Racing Hall of Fame.

== A casualty of the Great Depression ==
The Wall Street crash of 1929 marked the beginning of the Great Depression, the effects of which saw racetrack owners and all businesses across the United States scrambling to reduce costs to prevent closing. Aqueduct Racetrack would begin shuffling its races to cut purse money for some in order to enhance it for others. While the September 18, 1929 Oakdale was modified to claiming race status, it maintained its purse money until the economic downturn became so severe they had to cut the purse for the 1931 edition by 35% and for 1932 that new lower amount was cut in half. Still not enough to ensure the track's survival, the Oakdale had to be dropped from the fall schedule.

== Records ==
Speed record:

- 1:12.00 @ 6 furlongs: Ray Jay (1921)
- 1:12.00 @ 6 furlongs: Sarazen (1923)
- 1:12.00 @ 6 furlongs: Teheran (1926)

Most wins by a jockey:

- no jockey won this race more than once.

Most wins by a trainer:

- 5 – James E. Fitzsimmons (1920, 1921, 1924, 1927, 1931)

Most wins by an owner:

- 2 – Harry Payne Whitney (1907, 1930)
- 2 – Quincy Stable (James Francis Johnson) (1920, 1921)
- 2 – Belair Stud Stable (1924, 1931)

== Winners ==
Year	Winner	Age	Jockey	Trainer	Owner	Dist. (Furlongs)	Time	Win $
1932	Garden Message	2	George H. Bostwick	J. P. (Sammy) Smith	George H. Bostwick	6 f	1:12.80	$1,425
1931	Pardee	2	Tommy Malley	James E. Fitzsimmons	Belair Stud Stable	6 f	1:13.40	$3,050
1930	Smear	2	Alfred M. Robertson	James G. Rowe Jr.	Harry Payne Whitney	6 f	1:13.20	$4,625
1929	Martis	2	Charles Kurtsinger	Frank J. Kearns	Walter Schuttler	6 f	1:14.00	$4,375
1928	Calwick	2	Frank Moon	John Hastings	George M. Sidenberg	6 f	1:12.60	$4,450
1927	Nixie	2	Phil Goodwin	James E. Fitzsimmons	Wheatley Stable	6 f	1:12.60	$4,775
1926	Teheran	2	John Maiben	T. J. Healey	Walter J. Salmon Sr.	6 f	1:12.00	$4,750
1925	Sarmaticus	2	Frank Coltiletti	George P. Odom	Robert L. Gerry	6 f	1:13.40	$4,075
1924	Beatrice	2	George Fields	James E. Fitzsimmons	Belair Stud Stable	6 f	1:12.60	$4,650
1923	Sarazen	2	Clarence Kummer	Max Hirsch	Fair Stable	6 f	1:12.00	$4,500
1922	Runviso	2	Clifford Robinson	Johnny Loftus	Oak Ridge Stable	6 f	1:12.20	$2,550
1921	Ray Jay	2	Linus McAtee	James E. Fitzsimmons	Quincy Stable (James Francis Johnson)	6 f	1:12.00	$4,700
1920	Knobbie	2	J. D. Mooney	James E. Fitzsimmons	Quincy Stable (James Francis Johnson)	6 f	1:13.00	$4,025
1919	Krewer	2	Laverne Fator	Samuel C. Hildreth	Samuel C. Hildreth	6 f	1:13.00	$2,625
1918	Eternal	2	Andy Schuttinger	Kimball Patterson	James W. McClelland	6 f	1:14.40	$1,825
1917	Lanius	2	John McTaggart	A. Jack Joyner	George D. Widener Jr.	6 f	1:13.20	$1,755
1910	– 1916	Race not held						
1909	Hampton Court	2	Guy Garner	John E. Madden	John E. Madden	6 f	1:14.00	$
1908	Race not held							
1907	Royal Tourist	2	Walter Miller	John W. Rogers	Harry Payne Whitney	6 f	1:14.00	$1,555
1906	Stray	2	R McDaniel	Matthew Byrnes	Matthew Byrnes	6 f	1:14.00	$1,580
1905	Flip Flap	2	Roche Romanelli	A. J. Goldsborough	Jack A. Bennet	6 f	1:14.40	$1,745
1904	Jim Beattie	2	William Crimmins	T. J. Slattery	C. A. lnwick	6 f	1:14.80	$1,210
1903	Dick Turpin	2	Harry Cochran	Frank Regan	Frank Regan	6 f	1:13.40	$1,225
1902	Lyman Hay	2	Lucien Lyne	John P. Mayberry	Charles R. Ellison	7 f	1:28.00	$1,130
