= United States Champion Jockey by earnings =

Thoroughbred racing achievement

There is recognition for the United States Champion Jockey by earnings but no formal award is given to the jockey whose mounts earned the most purse money in American Thoroughbred racing.

== Most years won ==
1. Bill Shoemaker (10)
2. Laffit Pincay Jr. (7)
3. Eddie Arcaro, Jerry Bailey (6)

| Year | Jockey | Mounts | Wins | Earnings |
| 1908 | Joe Notter | 872 | 249 | $464,322 |
| 1910 | Carroll H. Shilling | 506 | 172 | $176,030 |
| 1911 | Ted Koerner | 813 | 162 | $88,308 |
| 1912 | James Butwell | 684 | 144 | $79,843 |
| 1913 | Merritt C. Buxton | 887 | 146 | $82,552 |
| 1914 | Joe McCahey | 824 | 155 | $121,845 |
| 1915 | Mack Garner | 775 | 151 | $96,628 |
| 1916 | John McTaggart | 832 | 150 | $155,055 |
| 1917 | Frank Robinson | 731 | 147 | $148,057 |
| 1918 | Lawrence Lyke | 756 | 178 | $201,864 |
| 1919 | Johnny Loftus | 177 | 65 | $252,707 |
| 1920 | Clarence Kummer | 353 | 87 | $292,376 |
| 1921 | Earl Sande | 340 | 112 | $263,043 |
| 1922 | Albert Johnson | 297 | 43 | $345,054 |
| 1923 | Earl Sande | 430 | 122 | $569,394 |
| 1924 | Ivan H. Parke | 844 | 205 | $290,395 |
| 1925 | Laverne Fator | 315 | 81 | $305,775 |
| 1926 | Laverne Fator | 511 | 143 | $361,435 |
| 1927 | Earl Sande | 179 | 49 | $277,877 |
| 1928 | Linus McAtee | 235 | 55 | $301,295 |
| 1929 | Mack Garner | 274 | 57 | $314,975 |
| 1930 | Raymond Workman | 571 | 152 | $420,438 |
| 1931 | Charley Kurtsinger | 519 | 93 | $392,095 |
| 1932 | Raymond Workman | 378 | 87 | $385,070 |
| 1933 | Robert Jones | 471 | 63 | $226,285 |
| 1934 | Wayne D. Wright | 919 | 174 | $287,185 |
| 1935 | Silvio Coucci | 749 | 141 | $319,760 |
| 1936 | Wayne D. Wright | 670 | 100 | $264,000 |
| 1937 | Charley Kurtsinger | 765 | 120 | $384,202 |
| 1938 | Nick Wall | 658 | 97 | $385,161 |
| 1939 | Basil James | 904 | 191 | $353,333 |
| 1940 | Eddie Arcaro | 783 | 132 | $343,661 |
| 1941 | Don Meade | 1164 | 210 | $398,627 |
| 1942 | Eddie Arcaro | 687 | 123 | $481,949 |
| 1943 | Johnny Longden | 871 | 173 | $573,276 |
| 1944 | Ted Atkinson | 1539 | 287 | $899,101 |
| 1945 | Johnny Longden | 778 | 180 | $981,977 |
| 1946 | Ted Atkinson | 1377 | 233 | $1,036,825 |
| 1947 | Douglas Dodson | 646 | 141 | $1,429,949 |
| 1948 | Eddie Arcaro | 726 | 188 | $1,686,230 |
| 1949 | Steve Brooks | 906 | 209 | $1,316,817 |
| 1950 | Eddie Arcaro | 888 | 195 | $1,410,160 |
| 1951 | Bill Shoemaker | 1161 | 257 | $1,329,890 |
| 1952 | Eddie Arcaro | 807 | 188 | $1,859,591 |
| 1953 | Bill Shoemaker | 1683 | 485 | $1,784,187 |
| 1954 | Bill Shoemaker | 1251 | 380 | $1,876,760 |
| 1955 | Eddie Arcaro | 820 | 158 | $1,864,796 |
| 1956 | Bill Hartack | 1387 | 347 | $2,343,955 |
| 1957 | Bill Hartack | 1238 | 341 | $3,060,501 |
| 1958 | Bill Shoemaker | 1133 | 300 | $2,961,693 |
| 1959 | Bill Shoemaker | 1285 | 347 | $2,843,133 |
| 1960 | Bill Shoemaker | 1227 | 274 | $2,123,961 |
| 1961 | Bill Shoemaker | 1256 | 304 | $2,690,819 |
| 1962 | Bill Shoemaker | 1126 | 311 | $2,916,844 |
| 1963 | Bill Shoemaker | 1203 | 271 | $2,526,925 |
| 1964 | Bill Shoemaker | 1056 | 246 | $2,649,553 |
| 1965 | Braulio Baeza | 1245 | 270 | $2,582,702 |
| 1966 | Braulio Baeza | 1341 | 298 | $2,951,022 |
| 1967 | Braulio Baeza | 1064 | 256 | $3,088,888 |
| 1968 | Braulio Baeza | 1089 | 201 | $2,835,108 |
| 1969 | Jorge Velásquez | 1442 | 258 | $2,542,315 |
| 1970 | Laffit Pincay Jr. | 1328 | 269 | $2,626,526 |
| 1971 | Laffit Pincay Jr. | 1627 | 380 | $3,784,377 |
| 1972 | Laffit Pincay Jr. | 1388 | 289 | $3,225,827 |
| 1973 | Laffit Pincay Jr. | 1444 | 350 | $4,093,492 |
| 1974 | Laffit Pincay Jr. | 1278 | 341 | $4,251,060 |
| 1975 | Braulio Baeza | 1190 | 196 | $3,674,398 |
| 1976 | Ángel Cordero Jr. | 1534 | 274 | $4,709,500 |
| 1977 | Steve Cauthen | 2075 | 487 | $6,151,750 |
| 1978 | Darrel McHargue | 1762 | 375 | $6,188,353 |
| 1979 | Laffit Pincay Jr. | 1708 | 420 | $8,183,535 |
| 1980 | Chris McCarron | 1964 | 405 | $7,666,100 |
| 1981 | Chris McCarron | 1494 | 326 | $8,397,604 |
| 1982 | Ángel Cordero Jr. | 1838 | 397 | $9,702,520 |
| 1983 | Ángel Cordero Jr. | 1792 | 362 | $10,116,807 |
| 1984 | Chris McCarron | 1565 | 356 | $12,038,213 |
| 1985 | Laffit Pincay Jr. | 1409 | 289 | $13,415,049 |
| 1986 | José A. Santos | 1636 | 329 | $11,329,297 |
| 1987 | José A. Santos | 1639 | 305 | $12,407,355 |
| 1988 | José A. Santos | 1867 | 370 | $14,877,298 |
| 1989 | José A. Santos | 1459 | 285 | $13,847,003 |
| 1990 | Gary Stevens | 1504 | 283 | $13,881,198 |
| 1991 | Chris McCarron | 1440 | 265 | $14,456,073 |
| 1992 | Kent Desormeaux | 1568 | 361 | $14,193,006 |
| 1993 | Mike E. Smith | 1510 | 343 | $14,024,815 |
| 1994 | Mike E. Smith | 1484 | 317 | $15,979,820 |
| 1995 | Jerry Bailey | 1367 | 287 | $16,311,876 |
| 1996 | Jerry Bailey | 1187 | 298 | $19,465,376 |
| 1997 | Jerry Bailey | 1136 | 269 | $18,206,013 |
| 1998 | Gary Stevens | 869 | 178 | $19,358,840 |
| 1999 | Pat Day | 1265 | 254 | $18,092,845 |
| 2000 | Pat Day | 1219 | 267 | $17,479,838 |
| 2001 | Jerry Bailey | 912 | 227 | $22,597,720 |
| 2002 | Jerry Bailey | 833 | 214 | $22,871,814 |
| 2003 | Jerry Bailey | 776 | 206 | $23,354,960 |
| 2004 | John Velazquez | 1327 | 335 | $22,248,661 |
| 2005 | John Velazquez | 1148 | 251 | $24,459,923 |
| 2006 | Garrett Gomez | 1273 | 261 | $21,922,592 |
| 2007 | Garrett Gomez | 1258 | 265 | $22,800,074 |
| 2008 | Garrett Gomez | 1023 | 214 | $23,344,351 |
| 2009 | Garrett Gomez | 967 | 210 | $18,536,105 |
| 2010 | Ramon Domínguez | 1474 | 369 | $16,911,880 |
| 2011 | Ramon Domínguez | 1424 | 348 | $20,267,032 |
| 2012 | Ramon Domínguez | 1398 | 342 | $25,639,432 |
| 2013 | Javier Castellano | 1617 | 362 | $26,219,907 |
| 2014 | Javier Castellano | 1365 | 315 | $25,056,464 |
| 2015 | Javier Castellano | 1507 | 344 | $28,120,809 |
| 2016 | Javier Castellano | 1418 | 300 | $26,826,241 |
| 2017 | José Ortiz | 1408 | 270 | $27,318,875 |
| 2018 | Irad Ortiz Jr. | 1616 | 346 | $27,727,039 |
| 2019 | Irad Ortiz Jr. | 1516 | 324 | $34,109,019 |
| 2020 | Irad Ortiz Jr. | 1266 | 300 | $21,050,726 |
| 2021 | Joel Rosario | 1083 | 228 | $32,956,215 |
| 2022 | Irad Ortiz Jr. | 1362 | 325 | $37,075,772 |
| 2023 | Irad Ortiz Jr. | 1,560 | 366 | $39,193,365 |
| 2024 | Flavien Prat | 1,040 | 230 | $37,286,176 |
| 2025 | Irad Ortiz Jr. |

== See also ==
- United States Champion Jockey by wins
