= Wayne D. Wright =

American jockey (1916–2003)

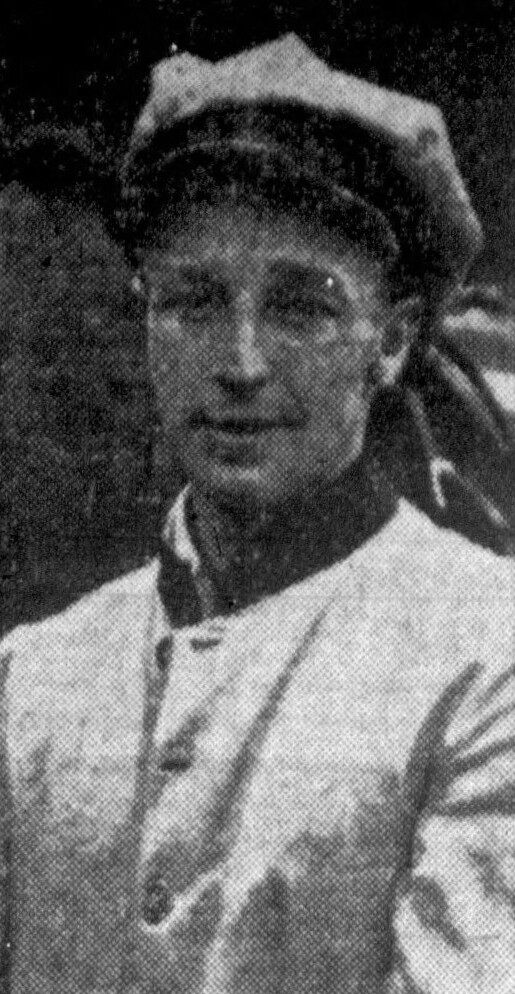
- Wright, circa 1943

Personal information
- Born: August 21, 1916 Rexburg, Idaho
- Died: March 11, 2003 (aged 86) Yerington, Nevada
- Occupation: Jockey

Horse racing career
- Sport: Horse racing

Major racing wins
- Belmont Futurity Stakes (1934); Champagne Stakes (1934, 1935); Derby Trial Stakes (1934); Jerome Handicap (1934, 1940); Saranac Handicap (1934); Walden Stakes (1934, 1935); Arlington Classic (1935, 1938); Dwyer Stakes (1935, 1940); Manhattan Handicap (1935); Narragansett Special (1935); Saratoga Cup (1935); Spinaway Stakes (1935); Withers Stakes (1935, 1945); Gazelle Handicap (1936); Santa Anita Derby (1936); Santa Anita Handicap (1936); Laurel Futurity (1937); Maryland Handicap (1937); Travers Stakes (1937); Fashion Stakes (1938, 1939); Flash Stakes (1938); Jockey Club Gold Cup (1938); Toboggan Handicap (1938, 1946); Whitney Handicap (1938); Matron Stakes (1940); Yonkers Handicap (1940, 1945); Wood Memorial Stakes (1942); Remsen Stakes (1943); Wilson Stakes (1943); Jersey Handicap (1944, 1946); Comely Stakes (1945); Edgemere Handicap (1945); Great American Stakes (1945); William Penn Stakes (1948) American Classic Race wins: Kentucky Derby (1942); Preakness Stakes (1945); Belmont Stakes (1934)

Racing awards
- United States Champion Jockey by earnings (1934, 1936)

Honors
- National Museum of Racing and Hall of Fame (2016)

Significant horses
- Blue Peter, Burning Star, Peace Chance, Omaha, Firethorn, Pompoon, War Admiral, Shut Out, Polynesian

Wayne Danforth Wright (August 21, 1916 – March 11, 2003) was an American Hall of Fame and National Champion Thoroughbred horse racing jockey who won all three of the Triple Crown races in different years.

Wayne Wright began riding in his small town of Rexburg, Idaho, and by age ten was riding in area fairground races. He began his professional career at age fourteen at a racetrack in Reno, Nevada, where he got his first win on July 15, 1931. Soon his skills saw him move to the race with the best on the New York State racing circuit where in 1934 he was the United States Champion Jockey by earnings and won the first of his three Triple Crown races. In 1936 he again led all American jockeys in earnings, winning stakes races on the U.S. East Coast plus in California where he won the West's most prestigious races at Santa Anita Park, the Santa Anita Derby and Santa Anita Handicap.

In 1939, Wright appeared in the Columbia Pictures film, Columbia World of Sports: Jockeys Up in which future National Radio Hall of Fame and American Sportscasters Hall of Fame inductee Bill Stern went to Santa Anita Park and spent the day visiting the stables and meeting with several jockeys, trainers, and horses.

== Triple Crown wins ==
At age seventeen, Wayne Wright won his first Classic race, taking the 1934 Belmont Stakes with Peace Chance. The following year he got his best result out his other four Belmont rides when he finished third on Rosemont.

Wright had six mounts in the Kentucky Derby, finishing second in 1936 and third in 1935 before winning the race in 1942 aboard Shut Out. Wright got the ride on Shut Out after Greentree Stable's star jockey Eddie Arcaro chose to ride the stable's top colt Devil Diver who finished sixth.

Wayne Wright also had six rides in the Preakness Stakes. In addition to his win in the 1945 Preakness Stakes on Polynesian, of his five other rides he had second-place finishes in 1935 and in 1937.

=== Aboard two Triple Crown champions ===
Wayne Wright was recognized as one of the best jockeys in North America and as such two owners and their trainers entrusted their Triple Crown champions to him. In 1935, Wright rode the Triple Crown winner Omaha to a win in the Dwyer Stakes and the Arlington Classic. In 1937, after Charley Kurtsinger was sidelined with an injury, Wright rode Triple Crown champion War Admiral to victory in the 1938 Jockey Club Gold Cup, Whitney Handicap and Saratoga Cup.

== Retirement ==
Battling weight gains throughout his career, Wayne Wright retired from riding in 1950. He then spent some time training horses until 1956 when he and his wife Nadia purchased an 80-acre (320,000 m^{2}) farm next to where his sister lived near Wellington in Smith Valley, Nevada.

Eighty-six-year-old Wayne Wright died in 2003 in hospital at Yerington, Nevada.

In 2016, Wayne Wright received Thoroughbred racing's highest honor with induction into the National Museum of Racing and Hall of Fame.
