= John McTaggart (jockey) =

American jockey

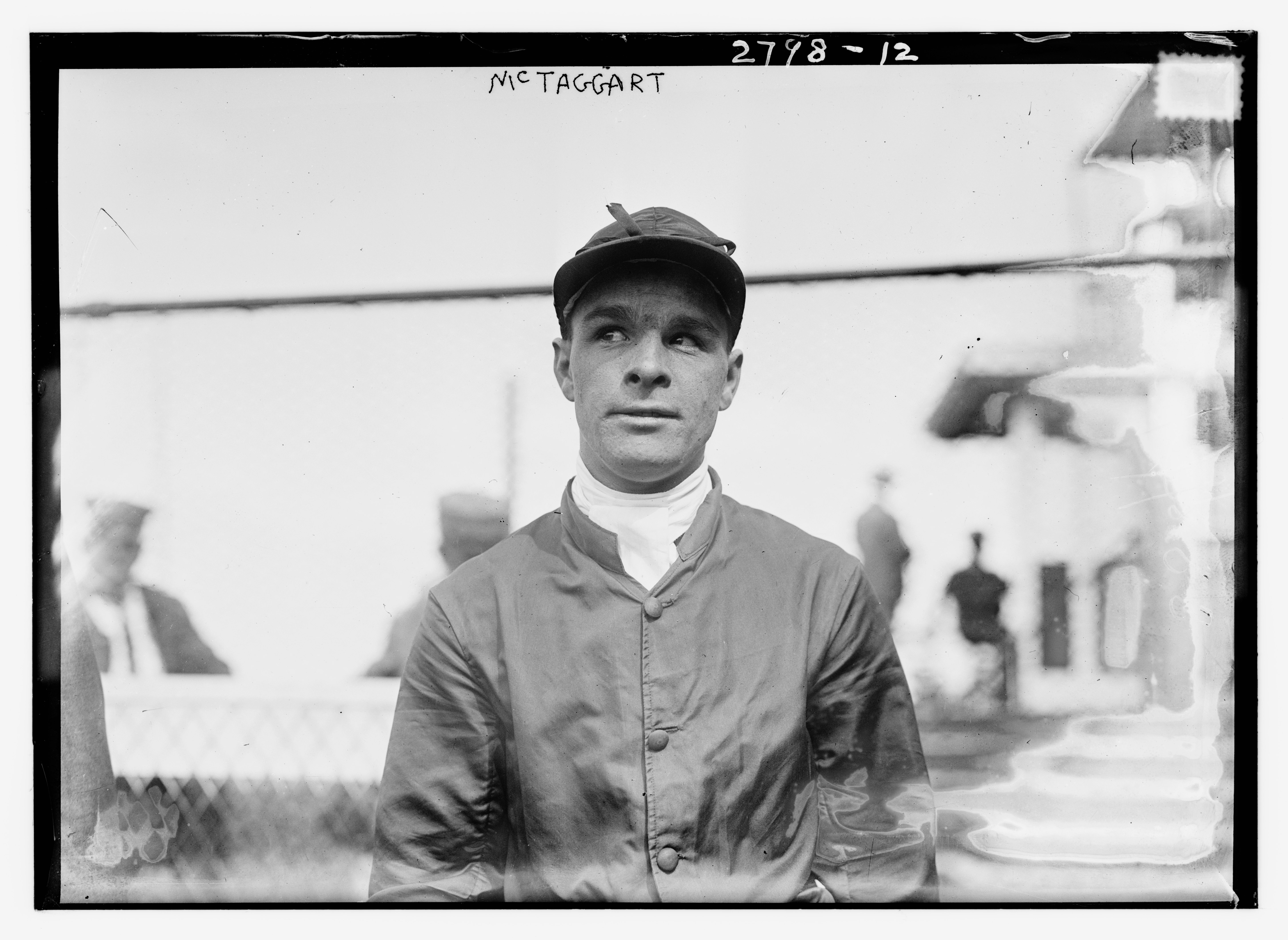

Personal information
- Born: 1896 New York City, New York, U.S.
- Died: April 18, 1946 (aged 49–50) Pikesville, Maryland, U.S.
- Occupation: Jockey

Horse racing career
- Sport: Horse racing
- Career wins: not found

Major racing wins
- Bowie Handicap (1914, 1915); Harford Handicap (1914, 1918); Matron Stakes (1914); Merchants and Citizens Handicap (1914); Brooklyn Handicap (1915); Potomac Handicap (1915); Belmont Futurity Stakes (1916); Great American Stakes (1916); Hopeful Stakes (1916); Municipal Handicap (1916); Saratoga Special Stakes (1916); Sanford Stakes (1916); Saratoga Cup (1916); Saratoga Handicap (1916); Bellrose Stakes (1917); Fall Highweight Handicap (1917); Glens Falls Handicap (1917); Metropolitan Handicap (1917); Oakdale Handicap (1917); Toboggan Handicap (1917); Mantague Handicap (1918); Coronation Futurity Stakes (1921, 1922, 1927); King Edward Gold Cup (1922); Toronto Cup Stakes (1922); Victoria Stakes (1922); Prince Georges Handicap (1926); Grey Stakes (1927, 1928)

Racing awards
- United States Champion Jockey by wins (1914); United States Champion Jockey by earnings (1916)

Significant horses
- Campfire, Stromboli

John McTaggart (1896 – April 18, 1946) was an American Champion jockey in the sport of Thoroughbred horse racing. He began his riding career in 1913 and rode for a quarter century until retiring in 1937. In 1914 he led all jockeys in the United States with 157 wins and in 1916 finished first in money earned and second in total wins to Frank Robinson.

McTaggart rode in the Kentucky Derby twice with his best result a second in the 1917 edition aboard Andrew Miller's colt, Ticket. He competed in the Preakness Stakes four times with his best finish a third in both 1912 and 1918. McTaggart was the regular jockey for Richard Wilson, Jr.'s outstanding colt Campfire. During his two-year-old season in 1916, McTaggart guided Campfire to wins in nearly all of the top races for juveniles, culminating with the Belmont Futurity Stakes and earning American Champion Two-Year-Old Colt honors. Among his other successes, McTaggart rode in Canada where he notably was a three-time winner of that country's premier race for two-year-olds, the Coronation Futurity Stakes at Old Woodbine Racetrack.

Afflicted with tuberculosis, John McTaggart died at age fifty in 1946 at a sanitarium in Pikesville, Maryland. His brother Tommy, also a former top jockey, had died a few months earlier in February 1946 in a paddock accident while working at Hialeah Park Race Track in Florida.
