= Albert Johnson (jockey) =

American jockey & trainer (1900–1966)

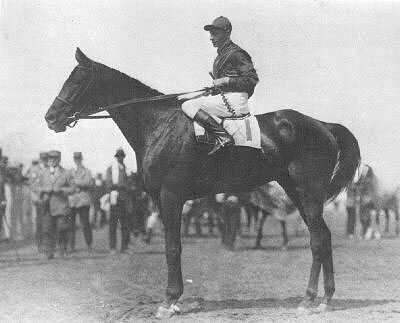
- Albert Johnson aboard Exterminator, 1922

Personal information
- Born: November 18, 1900 Oslo, Norway
- Died: September 18, 1966 (aged 65)
- Occupation: Jockey / Trainer

Horse racing career
- Sport: Horse racing
- Career wins: 503 (15.7%)

Major racing wins
- Tremont Stakes (1920); Hopeful Stakes (1921); Laurel Futurity (1921, 1922); Black-Eyed Susan Stakes (1922, 1925); Brooklyn Handicap (1922); Clark Handicap (1922); Hudson Stakes (1922); Kentucky Handicap (1922); Saratoga Cup (1922); Belmont Futurity Stakes (1922); Toronto Autumn Cup (1922); Coaching Club American Oaks (1923); Keene Memorial Stakes (1923, 1925); Adirondack Stakes (1925); Alabama Stakes (1925); Champagne Stakes (1925); Champlain Handicap (1925); Dwyer Stakes (1925); Fashion Stakes (1925); Ladies Handicap (1925); Maryland Handicap (1925); Matron Stakes (1925); Schuylerville Stakes (1925); Withers Stakes (1925); American Derby (1926); Ohio Derby (1926) American Classic Race wins: Kentucky Derby (1922, 1926); Belmont Stakes (1925, 1926)

Racing awards
- United States Champion Jockey by earnings (1922)

Honors
- National Museum of Racing and Hall of Fame (1971); Washington Racing Hall of Fame (2006); State of Washington Sports Hall of Fame (2018)

Significant horses
- Morvich, Exterminator, Bubbling Over; American Flag, Crusader

Albert M. Johnson (November 18, 1900 - September 18, 1966) was an American Hall of Fame jockey and trainer. Born in the rural community of Milan, Washington, Albert Johnson began his career in 1917 at Playfair Race Track in nearby Spokane.

Owner/trainer Stuart Polk recognized Johnson's potential and signed him to a contract. A year later, Polk sold Johnson's contract for a reported $15,000 to California horseman John H. Rosseter. The astute Polk would then sign another future Hall of Famer, Laverne Fator and in 1920 his brother Mark Fator who would become the 1922 American National Champion jockey by wins.

Albert Johnson's success at local racetracks led to a move to tracks in the New York City area where he was the principal jockey for Morvich in his undefeated two-year-old season in 1921 and with whom he won the 1922 Kentucky Derby. Johnson was hired by prominent owner/breeder Willis Sharpe Kilmer, whose racing stable had included Sun Briar and Exterminator. Riding for Kilmer brought Albert Johnson rode Exterminator to a number of important wins and ended 1922 as the United States Champion Jockey by earnings.

In all, Albert Johnson won four American Classic Races. In 1925, riding for Glen Riddle Farm, he won the Belmont Stakes aboard a son of Man o' War named American Flag. The following year Johnson won his second Kentucky Derby on Col. Edward R. Bradley's colt, Bubbling Over. Back in New York a few weeks later, he won his second straight Belmont Stakes for Glen Riddle Farm with Crusader, another colt sired by Man o' War. In the Preakness Stakes, Johnson had five career mounts with his best finish a fourth in 1926 and again in 1929.

Fighting to maintain his weight, in 1929 Johnson traveled to France where he rode in steeplechase races that accommodate heavier weight limits for jockeys. Returning home, he turned to training and in the mid-1930s was hired by longtime friend Bing Crosby to help condition horses for his Binglin Stable partnership. In 1937, Johnson was the trainer of record for Crosby's High Strike that won the Chula Vista Handicap.

Johnson went on to work as a timer at various major racetracks in California and was living in Millbrae at the time of his death in 1966. In 1971 he was inducted in the United States' Racing Hall of Fame, the Washington Racing Hall of Fame in 2006, and in 2018, the State of Washington Sports Hall of Fame.
