= Johnny Loftus =

American jockey (1895–1976)

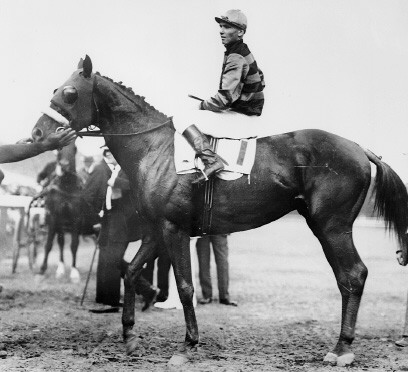
- Johnny Loftus aboard Sir Barton at the 1919 Preakness Stakes

Personal information
- Born: October 13, 1895 Chicago, Illinois, United States
- Died: March 23, 1976 (aged 80) Carlsbad, California, United States
- Occupation: Jockey/Trainer

Horse racing career
- Sport: Horse racing
- Career wins: 721

Major racing wins
- Hopeful Stakes (1913, 1919); Saratoga Cup (1913); Fleetwing Handicap (1915); Huron Handicap (1916); Jerome Handicap (1916); Southampton Handicap (1916); Travers Stakes (1916); Toboggan Handicap (1916, 1919); Withers Stakes (1916, 1919); Alabama Stakes (1917); Gazelle Handicap (1917); Kentucky Oaks (1917); Keene Memorial Stakes (1917, 1919); Walden Stakes (1917, 1918); Stuyvesant Handicap (1918, 1919); Remsen Stakes (1918); Fall Highweight Handicap (1918); Empire City Handicap (1919); Havre de Grace Cup Handicap (1919); Hudson Stakes (1919); Tremont Stakes (1919); Youthful Stakes (1919); United States Triple Crown (1919) American Classic Race wins: Kentucky Derby (1916, 1919); Preakness Stakes (1918, 1919); Belmont Stakes (1919) As a trainer: Oakdale Handicap (1922); Metropolitan Handicap (1924); Dixie Handicap (1938); San Carlos Handicap (1938)

Racing awards
- United States Champion Jockey by earnings (1919)

Honours
- United States' Racing Hall of Fame (1959)

Significant horses
- War Cloud, Regret, Pan Zareta, Pompoon, Man o' War, Sir Barton
- Updated on March 5, 2007

John Patrick Loftus (October 13, 1895 – March 23, 1976) was an American thoroughbred horse racing Hall of Fame jockey.

Born in Chicago, Illinois, Johnny Loftus was the first jockey to win the United States Triple Crown of Thoroughbred Racing. During his career, between 1909 and 1919, he won 580 races out of the 2,449 he competed in, for a very notable 23.7% success rate. In 1916, he won the Travers Stakes and Withers Stakes on "Spur" then captured the Kentucky Derby aboard George Smith. In 1917, he won the Kentucky Oaks with the filly Sunbonnet and the next year he rode War Cloud to victory in the Preakness Stakes. As well, Loftus rode Man o' War to victory in eight races, and to the only defeat in the horse's career, a second-place finish at the Sanford Memorial Stakes.

For trainer H. Guy Bedwell and Canadian owner J. K. L. Ross, who owned a farm in Maryland, in 1919 Johnny Loftus rode Sir Barton to victory in the Kentucky Derby then only four days later won the Preakness Stakes. They went on to win the Belmont Stakes becoming the first-ever American Triple Crown winner. Loftus ended up as 1919's top money-winning jockey in the US and retired at the end of the racing season to become a horse trainer. In 1938 and 1939, he enjoyed success as the trainer of Pompoon who was voted American Champion Two-Year-Old Colt in 1936. In 1959, he was inducted into the National Museum of Racing and Hall of Fame.

Johnny Loftus died in Carlsbad, California in 1976.
