= Comely =

American-bred Thoroughbred racehorse

- Sire: Disguise
- Grandsire: Domino
- Dam: Pretty Maiden
- Damsire: Kingston
- Sex: Filly
- Foaled: 1912
- Country: United States
- Colour: Brown
- Breeder: James R. Keene
- Owner: James Butler
- Trainer: Richard C. Benson
- Record: 22: 7-8-3
- Earnings: $17,355

Major wins
- Fall Highweight Handicap (1914); Keene Memorial Stakes (1914); Laureate Stakes (1914)

Honors
- Comely Stakes at Aqueduct Racetrack
- Last updated on 2008-12-22

Comely (foaled 1912) was an American Thoroughbred racehorse. She was bred by James R. Keene who sold her in a package deal to James Butler, owner of the Empire City Race Track. Butler had bought the entire 1912 crop produced by Keene's Castleton Stud.

== Background ==
Comely's sire was Disguise who raced in England for owner/breeder James R. Keene. Disguise was the winner of the 1900 Jockey Club Stakes and ran third in that year's Epsom Derby. Both her grandsire and damsire were elected to the U.S. Racing Hall of Fame.

Comely is best remembered from her racing days for a remarkable performance as a two-year-old when she defeated older male horses to win the first running of the Fall Highweight Handicap in 1914. Going into 2019, she remains the only two-year-old to win the Fall Highweight Handicap and one of only a few two-year-olds to defeat older horses in a major stakes race.

The Comely Stakes at Aqueduct Racetrack in Queens, New York is named in her honor.
