= Frank Coltiletti =

American jockey

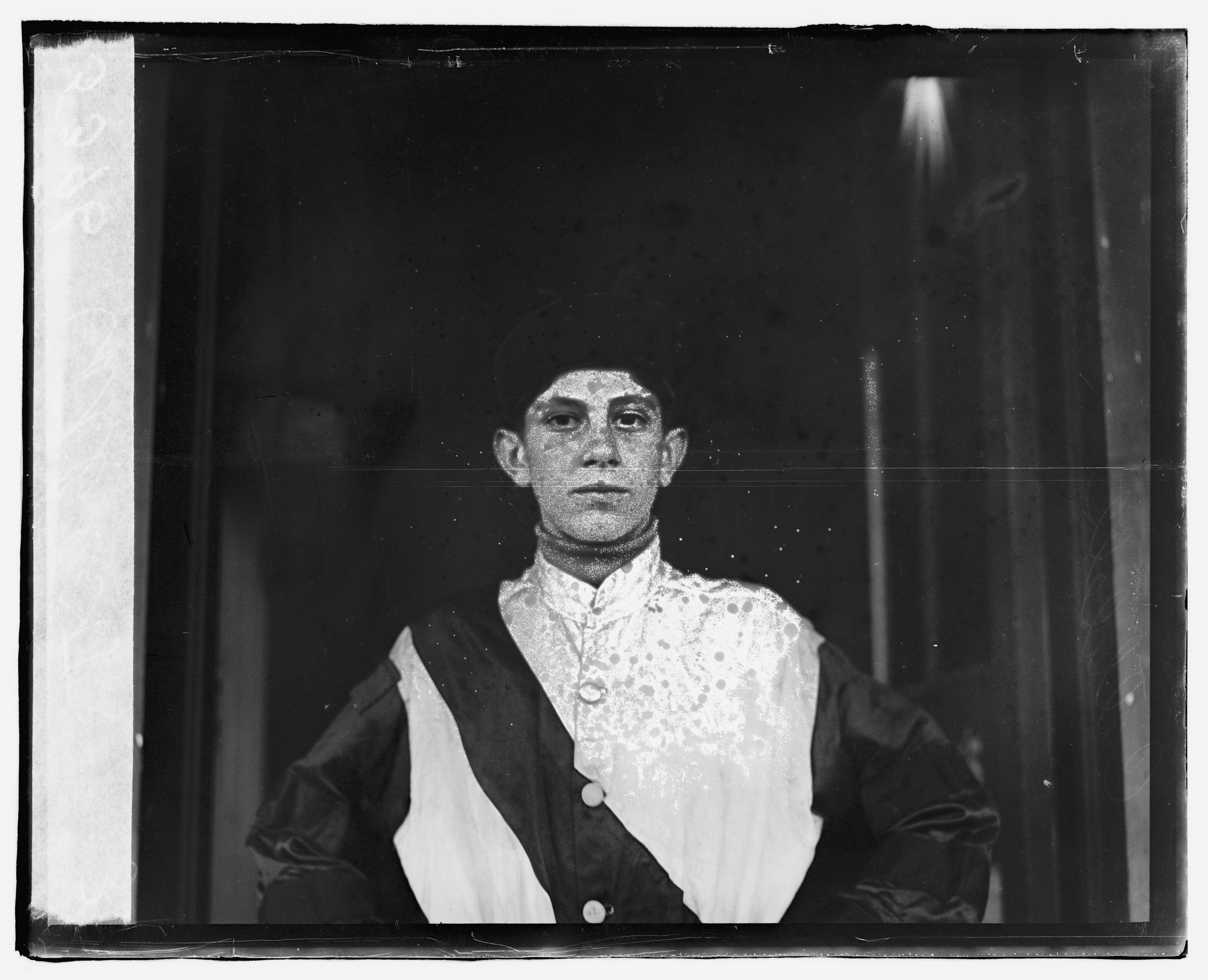

Personal information
- Born: April 23, 1904 New York City, U.S.
- Died: March 1987 (aged 82)
- Occupation: Jockey

Horse racing career
- Sport: Horse racing
- Career wins: 667

Major racing wins
- Stuyvesant Handicap (1921); Futurity Stakes (1921); Jerome Handicap (1921, 1923); Potomac Handicap (1921, 1931); Matron Stakes (1923); Demoiselle Stakes (1925); Hudson Stakes (1925); Huron Handicap (1925); Oakdale Handicap (1925); Southampton Handicap (1925); Chesapeake Stakes (1926); Travers Stakes (1926); Hopeful Stakes (1926); Coaching Club American Oaks (1926, 1931); Edgemere Handicap (1927); Metropolitan Handicap (1927); Ladies Handicap (1927); Aqueduct Handicap (1929); Coronation Futurity Stakes (1929); Havre de Grace Cup Handicap (1929); Hawthorne Gold Cup Handicap (1929, 1930); Toronto Autumn Cup (1930) American Classics Race wins: Preakness Stakes (1921)

Honors
- National Museum of Racing and Hall of Fame (1970); National Italian American Sports Hall of Fame (1985)

Significant horses
- Broomspun, Black Maria, Sun Beau, Mars
- Updated on November 24, 2007

Frank Coltiletti (April 23, 1904 – March 1987) was an American Hall of Fame jockey in Thoroughbred horse racing.

Coltiletti began his professional riding career in 1919 when he was just fifteen years old. Almost immediately he became one of the top jockeys in the country, competing two years after he began racing in his first American Classic Races. Of his eight mounts in the Kentucky Derby, his best finishes were a second aboard Sweep All to winner Twenty Grand in the 1931 running and third-place finishes in the 1926 and 1929 editions.

Coltiletti made seven appearances in the Preakness Stakes. After his fourth-place finish in his 1921 Derby debut, the seventeen-year-old won the Preakness aboard Broomspun. In addition to his 1921 win, his next best result was a third with Rialto in 1923 on whom he also finished third in the Belmont Stakes.

Coltiletti retired in 1934 after fifteen years in racing. He was inducted into National Museum of Racing and Hall of Fame in 1970 and the National Italian American Sports Hall of Fame in 1985.

Frank Coltiletti was living in Jamaica, Queens when he died in 1987 just a month shy of his 83rd birthday.
