= J. Linus McAtee =

American jockey (1898–1963)

Linus McAtee
Personal information
- Born: October 5, 1898 Frenchtown, New Jersey, U.S.
- Died: November 15, 1963 (aged 65)
- Occupation: Jockey

Horse racing career
- Sport: Horse racing
- Career wins: 930

Major racing wins
- Connaught Cup (1916); Woodstock Stakes (1916); Metropolitan Handicap (1918, 1930); Champagne Stakes (1919, 1926, 1929); Alabama Stakes (1920, 1926, 1930); Black-Eyed Susan Stakes (1920, 1923); Coaching Club American Oaks (1920); Huron Handicap (1920, 1923); Edgemere Handicap (1921, 1928); Havre de Grace Cup Handicap (1921, 1923); Kentucky Oaks (1921); Oakdale Handicap (1921); Saratoga Special Stakes (1922, 1929, 1930); Test Stakes (1922); Brookdale Handicap (1923, 1926, 1930); Champlain Handicap (1923); Hudson Stakes (1923, 1926, 1930); Philadelphia Handicap (1923); Tremont Stakes (1923, 1928); Washington Handicap (1923); Astoria Stakes (1924, 1925, 1926, 1930); Belmont Futurity (1924, 1928, 1930); Demoiselle Stakes (1924, 1926, 1928, 1930); Juvenile Stakes (1924, 1931); Keene Memorial Stakes (1924, 1926); Sanford Stakes (1924, 1929); Bay Shore Handicap (1926); Carter Handicap (1926); Empire City Derby (1926); Fashion Stakes (1926); Fleetwing Handicap (1926); Great American Stakes (1926); Jerome Handicap (1926, 1928); Manhattan Handicap (1926, 1929); Matron Stakes (1926, 1929); Queens County Handicap (1926); Southampton Handicap (1927); Flash Stakes (1928, 1930 +1 more); Gazelle Stakes (1928); Laurel Futurity (1928); Schuylerville Stakes (1928); Adirondack Stakes (1929); Empire City Handicap (1929); Pierrepont Handicap (1930); Jamaica Handicap (1931); Saratoga Cup (1931); Travers Stakes (1931); Whitney Handicap (1931); Withers Stakes (1931); Wood Memorial Stakes (1932) American Classic Race wins: Preakness Stakes (1916); Kentucky Derby (1927, 1929)

Racing awards
- United States Champion Jockey by earnings (1928)

Honours
- United States Racing Hall of Fame (1956)

Significant horses
- Damrosch, Mother Goose, Clyde Van Dusen, Whiskery, Jamestown, Twenty Grand
- Updated on August 11, 2008

John Linus McAtee (October 5, 1898 – November 15, 1963) was an American Hall of Fame jockey in Thoroughbred horse racing.

== Biography ==
Born in Frenchtown, New Jersey on October 5, 1898, he went by his middle name, Linus, but was nicknamed "Pony" by friends and would be called that by some in the press. While still an apprentice, he rode for Commander J. K. L. Ross in Canada then was aboard his colt Damrosch for the win in the 1916 Preakness Stakes.

Called one of the best riders of his era by the National Museum of Racing and Hall of Fame, McAtee developed into a superior tactician who won two Kentucky Derbys and who was the United States Champion Jockey in money earned for 1928. After retiring from racing in 1932, a comeback attempt three years later ended after he suffered a serious foot injury. In 1956, he was inducted in the United States' Racing Hall of Fame. McAtee died on November 15, 1963.
