= James E. Fitzsimmons =

American horse trainer

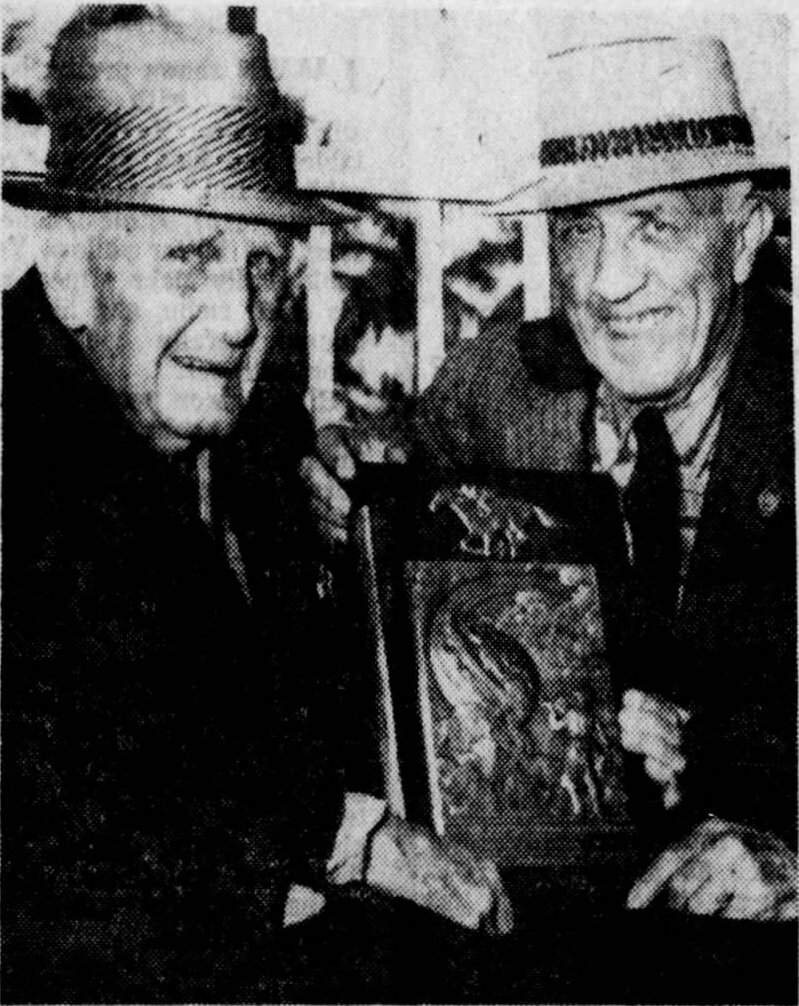
- Fitzimmons in 1960 (left)

Personal information
- Born: July 23, 1874 Sheepshead Bay, New York, U.S.
- Died: March 11, 1966 (aged 91) Miami, Florida, U.S.
- Occupation: Trainer

Horse racing career
- Sport: Horse racing
- Career wins: 2,275

Major racing wins
- Oakdale Handicap (1920, 1921, 1924, 1927, 1931); Southampton Handicap (1921, 1922, 1923); Suburban Handicap (1922, 1938, 1951, 1956, 1958); Juvenile Stakes (1927, 1932, 1954, 1956); Tremont Stakes (1927, 1932, 1948, 1952, 1953); Jockey Club Gold Cup (1929, 1930, 1933, 1934, 1944, 1955, 1956); Empire City Handicap (1930, 1932, 1934, 1940, 1942, 1946); Wood Memorial Stakes (1928, 1930, 1936, 1937, 1938, 1939, 1955, 1957) American Classic Race wins: Kentucky Derby (1930, 1935, 1939); Preakness Stakes (1930, 1935, 1955, 1957); Belmont Stakes (1930, 1932, 1935, 1936, 1939, 1955); United States Triple Crown (1930, 1935)

Racing awards
- U.S. Champion Trainer by earnings (1930, 1932, 1936, 1939, 1955)

Honours
- United States' Racing Hall of Fame (1958); National Turf Writers Association annual Mr. Fitz Award

Significant horses
- Hard Tack, Seabiscuit, Gallant Fox, Granville, Omaha, Johnstown, Nashua, Misty Morn, Dice, Bold Ruler
- Updated on September 28, 2007

James Edward "Sunny Jim" Fitzsimmons (July 23, 1874 – March 11, 1966) was an American Thoroughbred racehorse trainer.

== Early life ==
Fitzsimmons was born in Sheepshead Bay, Brooklyn in 1874. In 1877, the Sheepshead Bay Race Track was built, encircling his house, which remained in the infield of the track. Fitzsimmons began his career in 1885 working at the racetrack as a stable boy, dishwasher, exercise boy, reinsman, and jockey. After nearly ten unsuccessful years as a jockey, he became too heavy for the job and became a trainer. He went on to have one of the most successful careers in racing history, spanning seventy years from 1894 to 1963 with 2,275 race wins.

== Professional career ==
Known as both "Sunny Jim" and as "Mr. Fitz", he trained three Kentucky Derby winners, four Preakness Stakes winners, and six Belmont Stakes winners. Included were two U.S. Triple Crown champions: Gallant Fox in 1930 and his son Omaha in 1935. Fitzsimmons's total of thirteen Classic wins was broken by D. Wayne Lukas in 2013. Five times, Fitzsimmons was the season's top money-winning trainer. He also trained Hard Tack and his famous son, Seabiscuit.

In 1923, Fitzsimmons took over training at Belair Stud. Following the 1955 death of William Woodward, Jr., Belair's owner, Fitzsimmons continued to train for the Wheatley Stable, where he conditioned Preakness winner and 1957 American Horse of the Year Bold Ruler, who sired Secretariat.

== Accolades ==
In recognition of his accomplishments, in 1958 Fitzsimmons was inducted in the National Museum of Racing and Hall of Fame.

The National Turf Writers Association created an award in his name called the "Mr. Fitz Award" to honor a member of the horse racing fraternity each year.

== Personal life and death ==
Fitzsimmons suffered from arthritis, which caused his upper back to become severely bent, giving him a hunchbacked appearance. Fitzsimmons died in 1966 in Miami. He is buried in the Holy Cross Cemetery, Brooklyn.

== Selected wins ==
Selected other major stakes race wins:

- Saratoga Cup: 10
- Dwyer Stakes: 9
- Lawrence Realization: 8
- Alabama Stakes: 8
- Suburban Handicap: 5
- Withers Stakes: 4

== Sources ==
- Breslin, Jimmy Sunny Jim: The life of America's most beloved horseman, James Fitzsimmons (1962) Doubleday & Company, Inc.
- Bowen, Edward L. Masters of the Turf: Ten Trainers Who Dominated Horse Racing's Golden Age (2007) Eclipse Press (ISBN 978-1581501490)
- James Fitzsimmons at the United States' National Museum of Racing and Hall of Fame
- James Fitzsimmons and the Kentucky Derby
