= J. Thomas Taylor =

American horseman (1889–1966)

Personal information
- Born: September 24, 1889 Lexington, Kentucky
- Died: March 18, 1966 (aged 76) Arcadia, California
- Occupations: Trainer, thoroughbred owner, jockey

Horse racing career
- Sport: Horse racing

Major racing wins
- Cincinnati Enquirer Handicap (1929); Huron Handicap (1929); Hyde Park Stakes (1929); Latonia Championship Stakes (1929); Agua Caliente Handicap (1930); Flamingo Stakes (1933); Bay Meadows Handicap (1935); Illinois Derby (1935); San Antonio Handicap (1935); San Juan Capistrano Handicap (1935); Suburban Handicap (1935); Derby Trial (1936); Santa Anita Derby (1936); Bay Shore Handicap (1937); Jerome Handicap (1937); Christmas Handicap (1938); Interborough Handicap (1938, 1940); Junior Champion Stakes (1937); Butler Handicap (1940); Carter Handicap (1940); Continental Handicap (1940); Fleetwing Handicap (1940); Queens County Handicap (1940); Washington Handicap (1940); Wilmington Handicap (1940); Walter Connelly Handicap (1940); Saratoga Handicap (1942); Fall Highweight Handicap (1944); Gideon Putman Stakes (1944); Del Mar Derby (1952); Brandywine Handicap (1955); California Breeders' Trial Stakes (1956); California Breeders' Champion Stakes (1957)

Significant horses
- Ariel Lad, Can't Wait, Charlie O, Head Play, He Did, Pasha, Prince Khaled, South Arlington, Sun Portland, The Nut, Try Too, Victorian

John Thomas Taylor (September 24, 1889 – March 18, 1966), was an American horseman (thoroughbred jockey, trainer, breeder, and owner).

== Early life ==
Taylor was born in Lexington, Kentucky, on September 24, 1889. He was the son of Reuben and Margaret Taylor. The early part of his childhood was spent on a small two-acre farm near Brighton, Ky, where he first learned to ride on the family livestock.

== Career ==
=== Jockey ===
Taylor's first horse was a mare named Maggie Felix, whom his father purchased in 1898. Taylor was only 9 years old at the time, but shortly began galloping her on the nearby racetrack owned by Baker and Hines. His older brother, Jerry, had already been racing horses and decided to take Maggie Felix to Newport, Kentucky, the following year to test her racing abilities. She ended up placing second in her first race, and went on to win the next four consecutive races. Maggie's success at the track was the first indication of Taylor's skill with horses. In 1902, Jerry put him under contract to work with Mr. Inghram's horses. The following year, Taylor officially started his career as a riding apprentice. He was only 14 at the time, and as a result of his youth and inexperience, he was placed on bad horses until he could prove himself as a rider. It was not until 1904, when Taylor was placed on his first good horse, named Lady Charlotte, at Fort Erie, Canada. Taylor was told it was his "make it or break it" moment. If he couldn't handle a good horse, he would never get another chance. In spite of his nerves, he managed to win his first important race. That year, he ended up being the top apprentice in both Kentucky and Canada.

In 1905, Taylor was leased to Charley McCafferty and began racing for the first time in California. No longer an apprentice, he raced in meets at Lucky Baldwin's Old Santa Anita, the Fort Erie Racetrack, and Juarez Mexico up until 1909. Some of the top trainers Taylor rode for were: Johnny Ferris, Grover Baker, Peter Coyne, William J. Young, George Strate, Henry and Bill Daniels, and Ed Corrigan. As a result of "weighing out" as a jockey in 1909, Taylor turned to training horses. Taylor spent the following year in France as a wagoner, hauling ammunition to the war-front during WWI.

=== Trainer ===
When Taylor returned from France, he began conditioning top horses for such legendary owners as Hal Price Headley (co-founder of Keeneland Race Course), Robert M. Eastman, W. Arnold Hanger, Silas B. Mason, Myron Selznick and Clifford Moores.

Training Career (1920–1956)
Horse	Owner	Race Wins w/ Jockey
Try Too	Silas B. Mason & W. Arnold Hanger	Hyde Park Stakes (Willie Fronk, 1929), Cincinnati Enquirer Handicap (J. Smith, 1929)
The Nut	Silas B. Mason & W. Arnold Hanger	Latonia Championship Stakes (Joseph Smith, 1929), Huron Handicap (Mack Garner, 1929)
Victorian	Silas B. Mason & W. Arnold Hanger	Agua Caliente Handicap (George Ellis, 1930)
Head Play	Silas B. Mason	Bay Meadows Handicap (Charles Kurtsinger, 1935), San Antonio Handicap (Charles Kurtsinger, 1935), San Juan Capistrano (Charles Kurtsinger, 1935), Suburban Handicap (Charles Kurtsinger, 1935)
He Did	Silas B. Mason & W. Arnold Hanger	Derby Trial (Charles Kurtsinger, 1936), Santa Anita Derby (W. Wright, 1936), Bay Shore Handicap (Lester Balaski, 1937), Interborough Handicap (Leon Haas, 1938), Christmas Handicap (Lester Balaski, 1938), Fleetwing Handicap (Eddie Arcaro, 1940), Carter Handicap (George Woolf, 1940), Queens County Handicap (Eddie Arcaro, 1940), Wilmington Handicap (Basil James,1940)
Charlie O	Robert M. Eastman	Flamingo Stakes (John Gilbert, 1933)
Sun Portland	Silas B. Mason	Illinois Derby (Charles Kurtsinger, 1935)
Can't Wait	Myron Selznick	Junior Champion Stakes (Lester Balaski, 1937), Washington Handicap (Alfred Robertson, 1940), Walter Connelly Handicap (J. Rodriguez, 1940), Continental Handicap (Alfred Robertson, 1940), Butler Handicap (Basil James, 1940), Saratoga Handicap (Wendell Eads, 1942)
Pasha	Myron Selznick	Jerome Handicap (Lester Balaski, 1937)
Ariel Lad	Myron Selznick	Interborough Handicap (Eddie Arcaro, 1940), Fall Highweight Handicap (Eddie Arcaro, 1944), Gideon Putman Stakes (Eddie Arcaro, 1944)
South Arlington	J. Ross Clark II	Del Mar Derby (Robert Summers, 1952), Brandywine Handicap (William Boland, 1955)
Prince Khaled	General Winston Kratz	California Breeders' Trial Stakes (Eddie Arcaro, 1956), California Breeders' Champion Stakes (Eddie Arcaro, 1957)

Taylor's fortunes turned bright in 1930 when he took over Warm Stables, owned by Silas B. Mason and W. Arnold Hanger. That same year he conditioned Victorian to win the inaugural Agua Caliente Handicap in Tijuana, Mexico, then the world's richest race. His brother, Walter, won the same race the next year with Hal Price Headley's horse, Mike Hall.

Taylor was approached by Charles H. Strub (a.k.a. "Doc Strub") in 1933. Strub sought Taylor's assistance in helping him recruit other owners and trainers to come out to his new track out West, called Santa Anita Park. By that time, Taylor had a reputation as a legendary trainer and held the respect of his peers. Taylor, along with the owners/trainers he persuaded to come to Strub's track, made the track a success. In response, Strub gave Taylor his choice of Barns and stock. While Taylor rejected the stock option, due to his experience of the 1929 stock market crash and the Great Depression, he ended up choosing Barn 17 and Box 227. Later on, when Tommy was down on his luck, he turned over his box to Charles E. Whittingham; who was his close friend.

Success continued in 1934 with Preakness winner Head Play. After the racehorse was sidelined by an injury, Taylor took over as head trainer in 1934, and was able to condition Head Play, so he was able to return from his injury as a five year old to win four stakes races. Head Play was the son of My Play - full brother to Man o' War, one of the most famous race horses in the industry.

Taylor later trained, He Did, for Silas B. Mason. Together, they were able to get the win in the Santa Anita Derby in 1936. Controversy later surrounded He Did, when he was singled out years later by Laura Hildebrand, author of Seabiscuit: An American Legend. In her book, the horse was blamed for causing the catastrophic injury to jockey, Red Pollard (famous jockey of Seabiscuit). His horse, Fair Knightness, clipped heels with He Did, causing the horse to topple over Pollard in the San Carlos Handicap. Such accusations were later disputed by Taylor's family as unfounded, since the horse's stumble couldn't be blamed solely on He Did or the jockey.

Taylor next trained, Can't Wait, who ended up racing against Seabiscuit numerous times - including the famous 1940 Santa Anita Handicap, where he placed 8th.

Taylor's last major stakes race was with Prince Khaled, in the 1956 Del Mar Futurity - a race he won in 1950 with Patch. "Prince" set the world record only to be disqualified by a foul claimed early on the backstretch by legendary rider, Johnny Longden. Taylor was so disappointed by the stewards ruling, he left training to concentrate full time on breeding.

In spite of his frustrations later in his career, Taylor said:

“I was born with horses, they've been in my blood all my life. My ambitions were always to be a good rider and a good trainer. I think I've fulfilled them both.”

=== Breeder/Owner ===
Taylor began his breeding career with a foundation mare named, Planetoid. Taylor considered her and her progeny his best success, as it made him more money than his riding and training careers.

"I got her in 1936," Tommy said. "and, in a way, you can say she supported me ever since."

Planetoid was a small grey filly by Ariel out of La Chica, she by Sweep. Taylor liked her prospects as a broodmare because she had two crosses of Sweep in her bloodline.

Pedigree of Planetoid, grey filly, 1934
Sire Ariel	Eternal	Sweep	Ben Brush
Sire Ariel	Eternal	Sweep	Pink Domino
Sire Ariel	Eternal	Hazel Burke	Sempronius
Sire Ariel	Eternal	Hazel Burke	Retained
Sire Ariel	Adana	Adam	Flying Fox
Sire Ariel	Adana	Adam	Amie
Sire Ariel	Adana	Mannie Himyar	Himyar
Sire Ariel	Adana	Mannie Himyar	Mannie Grey
Dam La Chica	Sweep	Ben Brush	Bramble
Dam La Chica	Sweep	Ben Brush	Roseville
Dam La Chica	Sweep	Pink Domino	Domino
Dam La Chica	Sweep	Pink Domino	Belle Rose
Dam La Chica	La Grisette	Roi Herode	Le Samaritain
Dam La Chica	La Grisette	Roi Herode	Roxelane
Dam La Chica	La Grisette	Miss Fiora	Melton
Dam La Chica	La Grisette	Miss Fiora	Fiona

Noted Progeny by Planetoid:

- Grey Flight (one of the top broodmares of all time)
- Just-a-Minute (who produced three stakes winners for Taylor in Patch, Threesome, and On the Move)
- Boss Man - while not noteworthy as a racehorse, he was bred from Planetoid to Head Play and owned in partnership with Louis B Mayer, co-founder of MGM.

Taylor strongly believed a trainer was not a true horseman until he bred his own stock and won stake races in his own colors. To that end, Taylor was an accomplished breeder and owner. He was known for his singular style of breeding - owning one mare at a time and winning stakes races with her progeny. For example, in addition to Grey Flight, Taylor's Planetoid produced Just-a-Minute who foaled three stakes winners in Patch (winner of Del Mar Futurity), Threesome (winner of La Jolla Handicap) and On the Move (winner of the Los Flores Handicap).

Taylor died in 1966 in Arcadia, CA and is buried in Lexington, Kentucky. Success continued with the Taylors through his son John Thomas Taylor Jr. and cousin Joseph Lannon Taylor, well-known farm manager at Gainesway Farm. Even Joseph Taylor's sons, known as the "Taylor brothers," went on to success in the horse industry through Taylor Made Farm, a 1,600-acre Thoroughbred racehorse breeding farm and leading consignor of Thoroughbred horses, in Nicholasville, KY.
