= Fernando Fernandez (jockey) =

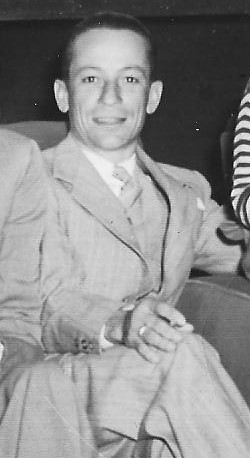
- Fernando Fernandez, 1945

Personal information
- Born: December 25, 1906 Havana, Cuba
- Died: November 30, 1988 (aged 81) Miami, Florida, United States
- Occupation: Jockey

Horse racing career
- Sport: Horse racing
- Career wins: 2,500+

Major racing wins
- Fleetwing Handicap (1950)

Racing awards
- Cuba National Riding Champion (1935-1942)

Honors
- Oriental Park Hall of Fame (1979) (Calder Racecourse)

Significant horses
- Armageddon, Jabato, Mi Preferido, Sheilas Reward, Spartan Valor

Fernando Fernandez (December 25, 1906 – November 30, 1988) was a Cuban-born, American champion thoroughbred horse racing jockey, who retired in 1953 as one of winningest riders of his era. Along with Ruperto Donoso of Chile, and, later, his younger brother Antonio Fernandez, he was among the first Latin American jockeys to find major success in the United States.

He was born in Havana in 1906, and went to work at the nearby Oriental Park Racetrack, in Marianao, as a teenager.

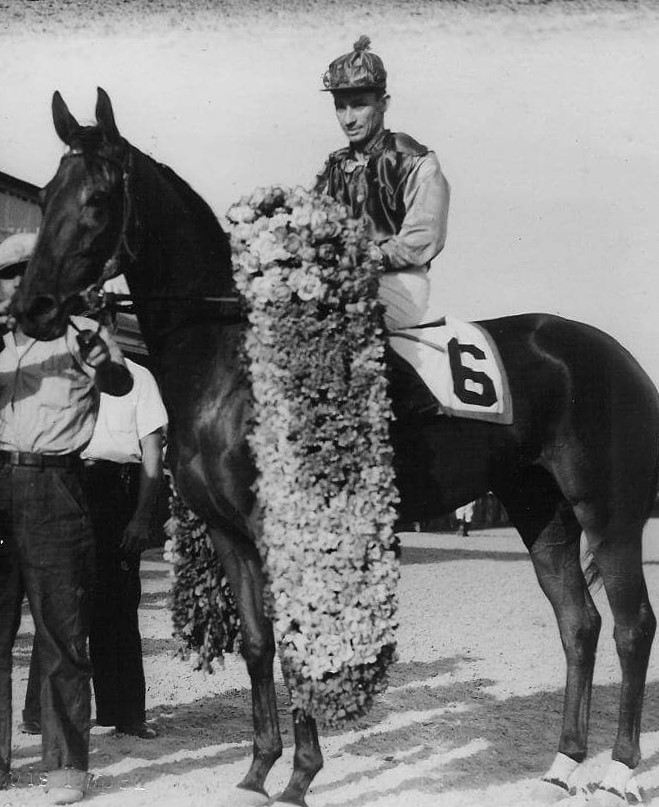
Cuban champion Fernando Fernandez, aboard Juanita, winner of the S.S. Washington Handicap, March 16, 1941, Oriental Park Racetrack, Havana, Cuba.

Beginning as an exercise rider for trainer Henry "Pepito" Torriente, he took out his jockey's license in 1931. His first big break came when he travelled to the United States with Torriente's large stable in May 1934. Fernandez won his first American race at Beulah Park in Ohio and was an immediate riding sensation, winning races at various meets across the Midwest. A favorite of both fans and the press, his successes were regularly reported in local and national newspapers. He was famously involved in a physical altercation with jockey George Woolf, who slashed him across the back with a whip during a race at the Fair Grounds Race Course in New Orleans. In the jockey's room later, Woolf again attacked Fernandez, bruising his face and blackening an eye before being restrained by other riders. The beating resulted in Woolf's 10 day suspension and a fine by the racing authorities. By September 13 of that year, he led the nations riders in races won with 108 winners, 147 seconds and 151 thirds, but ultimately finished in third place, with 21% winners from mounts average.

Fernandez returned to Cuba, hired agent Camilo Marin, and was the national riding champion from 1935 until 1942 When Hipodromo de las Americas opened in Mexico City, in March 1943, Fernandez accompanied Cuban trainer Leopoldo Sierra's large stable to the modern, new facility and dominated the standings there for the next several years. He was the contract rider for Mexican president Manuel Avila Camacho's Rancho Herradura, and set what was reported to be a world record by winning five consecutive races in a row on one card, for the same trainer He also garnered much attention when he flew 7500 miles to Argentina for a single race, having accepted a mount from prominent Cuban businessman and diplomat Eugenio de Sosa, in the prestigious Carlos Pelegrini Handicap.

He returned to the United States in 1948, where the Associated Press, stated that he had the unique distinction of having led the standings at every single meet he had ridden at for the previous ten years. He won riding championships at Rockingham Park, Atlantic City Race Course, Garden State Park and Monmouth Park. He rode for many of the days prominent trainers, including Hirsch Jacobs and Moody Jolley, and large stables such as Brookemeade (Isabel Dodge Sloane), Wheatley (The Phipps family) and Cain Hoy (Harry Guggenheim). He set a course record at Jamaica Race Course on Sheilas Reward, the American Champion Sprint Horse of 1950 and 1951. At the end of the 1951 racing season, and with over two–thousand winners to his name, only five other jockeys had won more races than Fernando Fernandez. He had won the Cuban and Mexican Derbies, the Sapling and numerous other stakes. He rode Jampol to a second-place finish in the 1952 Preakness Stakes at Pimlico.

In the summer of 1953 Fernando Fernandez retired with more than 2500 winners, and seventh on the list of racing's all-time leaders, which included Johnny Longden, Eddie Arcaro, Ted Atkinson, James Stout, Jack Westrope and John H. Adams, all future members of the National Racing Hall of Fame. He was one of the first five inducted into the Oriental Park Hall of Fame, honoring Cuban horsemen at Calder Racecourse in 1979, along with Avelino Gomez and Lazaro Barrera. Camilo Marin told the Daily Racing Form that in the 18 years he represented Fernandez, the rider was never once suspended for riding carelessly by track stewards, and that he had been a gentleman both on and off the track.

Fernando Fernandez died on November 30, 1988, in Miami, Florida, coincidentally only several hours before the death of his longtime agent, Camilo Marin, in California.

== Selected Stake Races Won ==
1952 New Jersey Futurity (Mon) High Hatter

1952 Benjamin Franklin Stakes (GS) Armageddon

1950 All American Handicap (Atl) Dart By

1949 Commonwealth Handicap (Suf) Mesmer

1949 Cuban Derby (OP) Mi Preferido

1951 Mexican Derby (HdLA) Jabato

1950 Fort Lauderdale Purse Sallequilo (ARG)

1950 Fleetwing Handicap (Emp) Sheila's Reward

1948 Lowell Handicap (Rkm) Agrarian-U

1947 Narragansett Nursery Stakes (NP) Tally

1947 General Greene Handicap (RkP) Agrarian-U

1951 Gran Premio Nacional (HdLA) Jabato

1950 Select Handicap (Mon) Sheila's Reward

1951 Select Handicap (Mon) Northern Star

1941 S.S. Washington Handicap (Ori) Juanita

1941 Miramar Yacht Club Handicap (Ori) Juanita

1952 Mermaid Handicap (AC) Landmark

1952 Omnibus Handicap (MON) Joey Boy

1952 Ventnor Handicap (AC) Armageddon

1952 Tyro Stakes (MON) South Point

1952 Sapling Stakes (MON) Landlocked

1951 Pageant Handicap (Atl) Spartan Valor
