= Eugene Jacobs =

American horse trainer (b. 1912, d. 1999)

Gene Jacobs
Personal information
- Born: November 9, 1912 New York City, USA
- Died: May 20, 1999 (aged 86) Kew Gardens, New York, USA
- Occupations: Trainer, Owner

Horse racing career
- Sport: Horse racing

Major racing wins
- Lamplighter Stakes (1949); Shevlin Stakes (1949); Fleetwing Handicap (1950); Interborough Handicap (1950); Select Handicap (1950); Bay Shore Handicap (1951); Long Branch Handicap (1951); Queens County Handicap (1951); Champlain Handicap (1954); Bougainvillea Handicap (1957); Lawrence Realization Stakes (1958); Salvator Mile Handicap (1960); Bay Shore Stakes (1964, 1972); Youthful Stakes (1965); Saratoga Special Stakes (1966, 1980, 1982); Donn Handicap (1968); Seminole Handicap (1968); Garden State Stakes (1969); Governor Stakes (1970); Paumonok Handicap (1971); Prince Georges Stakes (1972); Swift Stakes (1972); American Derby (1974); Florida Derby (1977); Fountain of Youth Stakes (1977); Champagne Stakes (1979); New York Stakes (1979); True North Stakes (1981); Iroquois Handicap (1982); Juvenile Stakes (1982); Hutcheson Stakes (1987)

Significant horses
- Colonel Mike, Explodent, Favorable Turn, Sheilas Reward, Victorious

Eugene Jacobs (November 9, 1912 – May 20, 1999) was an American trainer and owner of Thoroughbred racehorses who conditioned Sheilas Reward to back-to-back American Champion Sprint Horse national honors in 1950 and 1951. He was a brother to trainer Sidney Jacobs and to U.S. Racing Hall of Fame trainer Hirsch Jacobs.

== Career ==
Jacobs began working in 1939 at age seventeen as a groom for the stable of older brother Hirsch. In 1944 he went out on his own and over the years trained for prominent owners such as Herbert A. Allen Sr., Louis Lazare, and Perne L. Grissom. Jacobs retired from racing on September 1, 1989.
