= Select Stakes =

Select Stakes may refer to one of the following races:

- Select Stakes (Great Britain), a discontinued flat horse race in Great Britain
- Select Stakes (United States), a horse race in the United States
- Select Stakes (English greyhound race), a competition held at Nottingham Greyhound Stadium
- Select Stakes (Irish greyhound race), a competition held at Kilcohan Park
