= Turfway Park Fall Championship Stakes =

Fall Championship Stakes
- Class: Discontinued stakes
- Location: Turfway Park; Florence, Kentucky, United States
- Inaugurated: 1919
- Race type: Thoroughbred – Flat racing
- Website: www.turfway.com

Race information
- Distance: 1 1/2 miles (12 furlongs)
- Surface: Polytrack synthetic dirt
- Track: Left-handed
- Qualification: Three-years-old & up
- Weight: Assigned
- Purse: US$100,000

The Fall Championship Stakes was an American Grade III Thoroughbred horse race held annually at Turfway Park in Florence, Kentucky. Open to horses age three and older, it was contested on Polytrack synthetic dirt. It had been part of the Breeders' Cup Challenge series from 2008 through 2010 when the distance was changed to one and one half miles (12 furlongs) with the winner automatically qualifying for the Breeders' Cup Marathon at a similar distance.

The Latonia Championship Stakes was created in 1919 by the Kentucky Jockey Club as a race for three-year-olds at the now defunct Latonia Race Track in Latonia, Kentucky. During the height of the Great Depression the race was suspended in 1934 and the racetrack closed permanently in 1939. In 1964, the race was revived by the newly built (1959) Turfway Park.

The Fall Championship was run in two divisions in 1971 and there was no race in 1972.

Distances:

- 1 3/4 miles : 1919–1933
- 1 1/16 miles : 1968–1987
- 1 1/8 miles : 1964–1967, 1988–2002
- 1 mile 2003–2007
- 1 1/2 miles : 2008–2009

== Records ==
Speed record: (at current distance of 1 1/2 miles)

- 2:32.25 – Delightful Kiss (2008)

Most wins

- 2 – Crafty Shaw (2002, 2003)

Most wins by a jockey

- 5 – Mike Manganello (1966, 1967, 1968, 1969, 1971)

Most wins by a trainer

- 3 – Thomas H. Stevens (1967, 1969, 1978)
- 3 – William I. Mott (1996, 1998, 2007)

Most wins by an owner

- 2 – William R. Coe (1920, 1933)
- 2 – Charles J. Cella (2002, 2003)

== Winners ==
Year	Winner	Age	Jockey	Trainer	Owner	Time
2010	Eldaafer	5	Jon Court	Diane Alvarado	Alghuwayriyah Stable	2:32.55
2009	Nite Light	5	Jon Court	Todd A. Pletcher	Edward P. Evans	2:32.55
2008	Delightful Kiss	4	Calvin Borel	Pete D. Anderson	Hobeau Farm	2:32.25
2007	Istan	5	Larry Melancon	William I. Mott	Darpat S. L. Stables	1:38.81
2006	Gouldings Green	5	Corey Lanerie	Anthony Reinstedler	Melnyk Racing Stables	1:38.15
2005	Artemus Sunrise	4	Jesus Castanon	Steven Flint	Thad Ackel	1:37.31
2004	Cappuchino	5	Dean Sarvis	Jerry Hollendorfer	G. Todaro/H. Litt/J. Hollendorfer	1:37.19
2003	Crafty Shaw	5	Craig Perret	Peter M. Vestal	Charles J. Cella	1:36.89
2002	Crafty Shaw	4	James Lopez	Peter M. Vestal	Charles J. Cella	1:52.60
2001	Generous Rosi	6	Lonnie Meche	Niall O'Callaghan	Flying Column Stable	1:49.83
2000	Mount Lemon	6	Robby Albarado	Jere R. Smith Jr.	Panic Stable	1:51.14
1999	Phil the Grip	5	Robby Albarado	Niall O'Callaghan	Paul H. Saylor	1:52.15
1998	Acceptable	4	Craig Perret	William I. Mott	Kinsman Stable	1:51.95
1997	Tejano Run	5	Willie Martinez	Kenneth McPeek	Roy K. Monroe	1:49.44
1996	Strawberry Wine	4	Brian Peck	William I. Mott	G. Hudson & B. Lunsford	1:50.15
1995	Bound by Honor	4	Randy Romero	Carl Nafzger	Mr. & Mrs. James W. Phillips	1:51.54
1994	Meena	6	Willie Martinez	Bobby C. Barnett	John A. Franks	1:52.92
1993	Powerful Punch	4	Curt Bourque	Harvey L. Vanier	Russell Reineman Stable	1:50.51
1992	Flying Continental	6	Jorge Velásquez	Jesse Wigginton	Ross Harris & Nancy Yearsley	1:48.67
1991	Allijeba	5	James Bruin	Larry Robideaux	Robert Allensworth	1:49.60
1990	Aly Mar	4	Dean Kutz	William H. Fires	Calumet Farm	1:49.20
1989	Currentsville Lane	4	W. John Neagle	Frank Faircloth	W. Crump & P. Crump	1:51.60
1988	Mr. Odie	4	Steve Neff	David Burgan	JoJo Farm	1:52.40
1987	Lord Glacier	4	Mickey Solomone	Donald B. Plummer	Hugh M. Crombie	1:43.60
1986	Big Pistol	5	Larry Melancon	Lynn S. Whiting	W. Cal Partee	1:42.80
1985	Country Hick	4	Julio Espinoza	Alois W. Best	Alois W. Best	1:43.00
1984	Immediate Reaction	4	Michael McDowell	Gregory Foley	Heslop Stables	1:43.80
1983	Cad	5	Don Brumfield	Dave Kassen	Double Eagle Stables	1:44.00
1982	Leader Jet	4	Charles Woods Jr.	Neil J. Howard	Robert G. Kluener	1:44.00
1981	Exterminate	4	Darrell Foster	Toni Needs	F. B. Frasier	1:44.40
1980	Silver Shears	3	Reyes Matias	Glen Wismer	Mary M. Zimmerman	1:43.20
1979	Lotta Honey	4	Julio Espinoza	Jasper Adams	Golden Chance Farm	1:42.40
1978	Likely Exchange	4	Mark Sellers	Thomas H. Stevens	Pamela S. Humphrey	1:45.60
1977	Certain Roman	4	Michael McDowell	Winston Neil	C. L. Collins Jr.	1:44.80
1976	Brustigert	6	Al Herrara	Pat B. Devereaux	T. F. Devereaux	1:45.40
1975	Eager Wish	6	Clyde Bramble	Raymond W. Toole	Robert Harden	1:44.40
1974	Bootlegger's Pet	4	G. Solomon	Charles C. Patrick	Patrick & Victor McGinnis	1:47.60
1973	Knight Counter	5	Don Brumfield	Vic A. Doleski	Robert Huffman	1:46.80
1972	Race not held					
1971	Man of Parts	4	Joe McIntosh	Sandra Nowacki	Carl C. Nowacki	1:44.20
1971	Tesart	3	Mike Manganello	Francis W. Newbrough	Francis W. Newbrough	1:44.20
1970	Tort-Feazor	3	Oswaldo Torres	D. Evans	Court House Farm	1:44.40
1969	DeMito	4	Mike Manganello	Thomas H. Stevens	S. S. Scheidman	1:46.60
1968	T. V.'s Princess	4	Mike Manganello	Herman K. Goodpaster	Mrs. J. A. Goodwin	1:45.40
1967	Likely Swap	5	Mike Manganello	Thomas H. Stevens	G. M. Humphrey	1:51.00
1966	Brochazo	5	Mike Manganello	Anthony L. Basile	Bwamazon Farm	1:52.20
1965	Basking	7	Jimmy Lynch	Dennis R. Noviello	Noviello-Carr	1:51.60
1964	Sought After	3	J. Warner	Walter U. Ridenour	Campbell-Ridenour	1:58.00
1933	Pomposity	3	John Bejshak	Bud Stotler	William R. Coe	3:02.00
1932	Gallant Sir	3	George Woolf	Woody Fitzgerald	Northway Stables	3:12.40
1931	St. Brideaux	3	Charles Kurtsinger	Marshall C. Lilly	Greentree Stable	3:01.40
1930	Spinach	3	George Ellis	Clyde Phillips	William Ziegler Jr.	2:59.60
1929	The Nut	3	Joseph Smith	Joe Notter	Warm Stable (Silas B. Mason & W. Arnold Hanger)	3:26.00
1928	Sun Beau	3	John Craigmyle	Andrew G. Blakely	Willis Sharpe Kilmer	3:00.60
1927	Rolled Stocking	3	Willie Crump	Charles C. Van Meter	James W. Parrish	2:55.60
1926	Display	3	John Maiben	Thomas J. Healey	Walter J. Salmon Sr.	2:58.80
1925	King Nadi	3	Earle Sande	John J. Troxler	John J. Troxler	3:06.40
1924	Chilhowee	3	Mack Garner	John C. Gallaher	John & Allen Gallaher	2:54.60
1923	In Memoriam	3	Mack Garner	Robert J. Gilmore	C. Wiedermann	3:00.80
1922	Rockminister	3	Mack Garner	Kay Spence	Monfort Jones	2:55.60
1921	Sporting Blood	3	Frank Keogh	William M. Booth	H. C. "Bud" Fisher	3:05.60
1920	Cleopatra	3	Charles Fairbrother	William H. Karrick	William R. Coe	2:56.80
1919	Mad Hatter	3	Laverne Fator	David J. Leary	Sam Hildreth	3:06.00
