= 1928 Preakness Stakes =

53rd running of the Preakness Stakes

53rd Preakness Stakes
- The Preakness Stakes
- Location: Pimlico Race Course; Baltimore, Maryland, U.S.
- Date: May 11, 1928
- Distance: 1 3/16 mi (9.5 furlongs; 1,900 m)
- Winning horse: Victorian
- Winning time: 2:00 1/5
- Final odds: 9.35-1
- Jockey: Raymond Workman
- Trainer: James G. Rowe Jr.
- Owner: Harry Payne Whitney
- Conditions: Fast
- Surface: Dirt

The 1928 Preakness Stakes was the 53rd running of the Preakness. The race took place on Friday, May 11, 1928, eight days before the Kentucky Derby making it the first leg of the U.S. Triple Crown series. A horse race for three-year-old thoroughbreds, it carried a total purse of $71,370. It was run on a track rated fast in a final time of 2:00 1/5. Ridden by future U.S. Racing Hall of Fame inductee Raymond Workman, Victorian won the race by a nose over runner-up Toro. Nassak, the betting favorite from the powerful Rancocas Stable finished a distant 11th. The fifth-place finisher, Sun Beau, went on to a brilliant racing career and was voted U.S. Champion Older Horse in three straight years culminating with his 1996 induction into the U.S. National Museum of Racing and Hall of Fame.

== No Triple Crown attempt ==
The owners of the Preakness winner chose not to send the colt to Louisville, Kentucky to compete in the May 19th Kentucky Derby. The Daily Racing Form reported that Victorian's owner made a statement by telephone saying the colt had gone through a very tough Preakness and did not do well after the race. Plans called for transporting Victorian to Belmont Park where he would run in the Withers Stakes if his trainer thought the colt was healthy. Victorian won the Withers Stakes.

== Record crowd ==
The Daily Racing Form reported there was a record crowd in attendance on Preakness day which included notables such as Belgium's Prince Ernest and Princess Marguerite de Ligne, Joseph P. Kennedy Sr., father of a future President of the United States, the British Ambassador Sir Esmé Howard, Bernard Baruch, George Saportas, and James Wood Colt, among others.

Maryland Governor Albert Ritchie presented the Woodlawn Vase to James G. Rowe Jr., the winning trainer who accepted it on behalf of the absent Harry Payne Whitney.

== Death of scheduled Preakness rider ==
Twenty-five-year-old jockey Ovila Bourassa was scheduled to ride Solace in the 1928 Preakness. The colt, who would finish third, was owned by the Seagram Stables for whom jockey Bourassa had ridden Sir Harry to a second-place finish in the 1927 Preakness Stakes. Three weeks prior to the running of the 1928 Preakness, the young jockey died from a fractured skull after the saddle girth slipped on a horse he was breezing in the early morning hours at Havre de Grace Racetrack in Havre de Grace, Maryland.

A champion Canadian jockey, and very popular with his racing fraternity and race fans in the United States, Ovila Bourassa's death received wide coverage in newspapers in both countries. The New York Times wrote that Bourassa "rode winners of many classics" and was "one of the best-known riders in the country". The New York Daily News called him a "rider of great promise" and someone who was "in the first rank of riders." In his native Canada, the Calgary Daily Herald said Ovila Bourassa was "one of the outstanding figures in Canadian racing."

== Payout ==
The 51st Preakness Stakes Payout Schedule

Program Number	Horse Name	Win	Place	Show
7	Victorian	$20.70	$10.20	$7.50
8	Toro	-	$22.00	$14.20
3	Solace	-	-	$19.50

== The full chart ==
Daily Racing Form Charts

Finish Position	Margin (lengths)	Post Position	Horse name	Jockey	Trainer	Owner	Post Time Odds	Earnings
1st	0	7	Victorian	Raymond Workman	James G. Rowe Jr.	Harry Payne Whitney	9.35-1	$60,000
2nd	NO	8	Toro	Eddie Ambrose	John F. Schorr	Edward Beale McLean	21.70-1	$5,000
3rd	21/2	3	Solace	Leslie Pichon	William H. Bringloe	Seagram Stables	37.25-1	$3,000
4th	3	4	Strolling Player	George Fields	Robert A. Smith	Salubria Stable	4.55-1 †	$2,000
5th	HD	6	Sun Beau	John Craigmyle	Charles W. Carroll	Willis Sharpe Kilmer	17.85-1	
6th	6	17	Penalo	Willie Kelsay	Robert A. Smith	Lawrence Waterbury II	15.55-1 Ŧ	
7th	HD	14	Typhoon	Louis Schaefer	H. Guy Bedwell	Kenton Farm stable	21.30-1	
8th	4	1	Bateau	Fred Stevens	Scott P. Harlan	Walter M. Jeffords, Sr.	25.35-1	
9th	1/2	12	Distraction	Danny McAuliffe	George Tappen	Wheatley Stable	11.35-1	
10th	NK	13	Don Q.	Pete Walls	Joseph H. Stotler	Sagamore Stable	61.35-1	
11th	NK	9	Nassak	Laverne Fator	Sam Hildreth	Rancocas Stable	2.35-1	
12th	11/2	11	Sortie	Clarence Kummer	Max Hirsch	A. Charles Schwartz	15.55-1 Ŧ	
13th	1	15	Bobashela	Herb Fisher	S. Miller Henderson	Audley Farm Stable	4.55-1 †	
14th	11/2	10	Friar's Hope	Edgar Barnes	James S. Butler	Mrs. J. Simpson Dean	143.95-1	
15th	1	16	Knapsack	Steve O'Donnell	William M. Garth	Salubria Stable	4.55-1 †	
16th	11/2	2	Oh Say	Anthony Pascuma	Albert B. Gordon	Fair Stable	92.65	
17th	1/2	18	Petee-Wrack	Mack Garner	Willie Booth	John R. Macomber	18.65	
18th	8	5	Brooms	Harvey Elston	Gwyn R. Tompkins	Brookmeade Stable	18.85	

- Ŧ coupled and † coupled
- Winning Breeder: Harry Payne Whitney; (KY)
- Times: 1/4 mile – 23 2/5; 1/2 mile – 47 2/5; 3/4 mile – 1:13 0/0; mile – 1:38 4/5; 1 3/16 (final) – 2:00 1/5
- Track condition: fast
