= Head Play =

American Thoroughbred racehorse

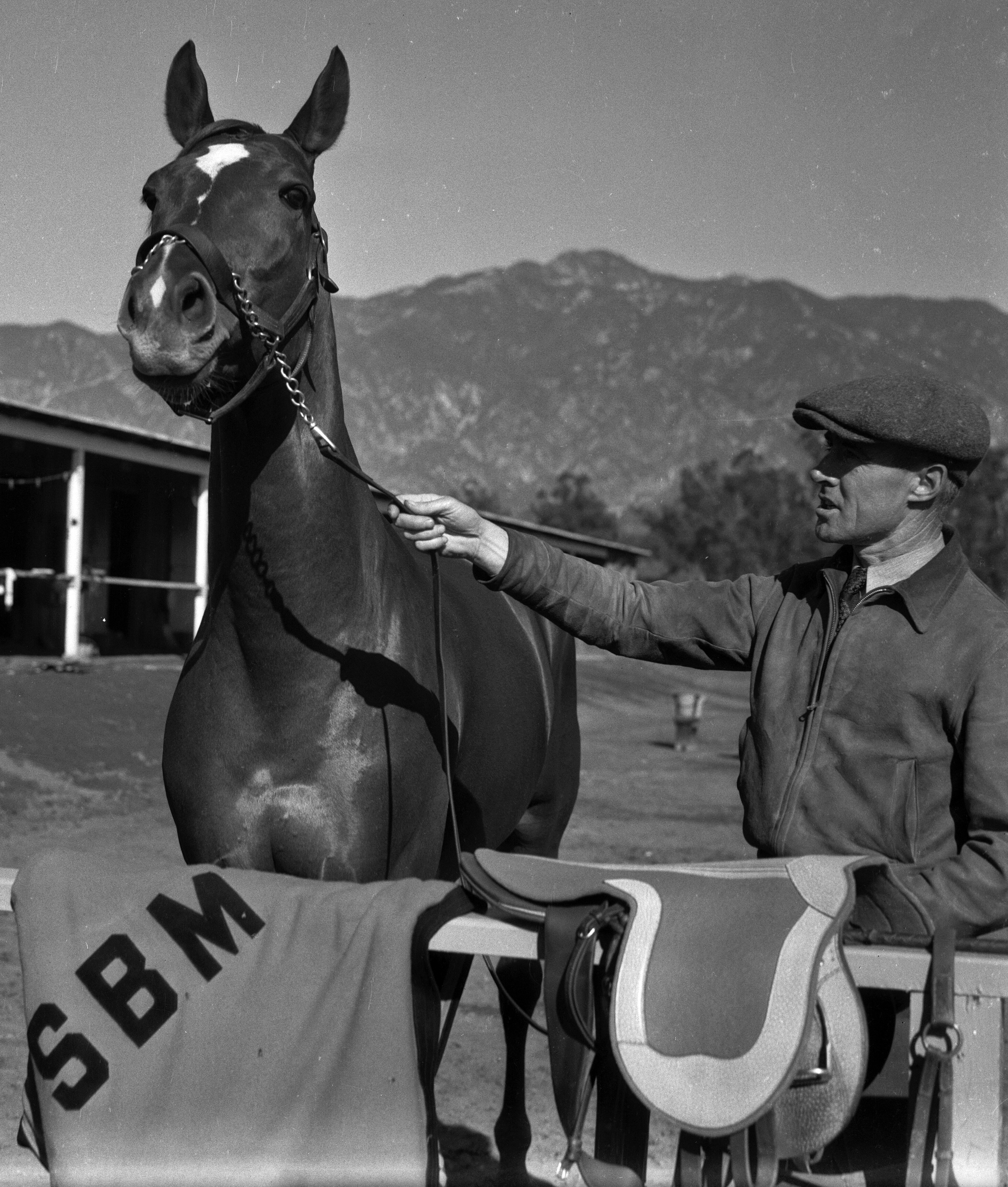
- Head Play in the late 1930s
- Sire: My Play
- Grandsire: Fair Play
- Dam: Red Head
- Damsire: King Gorin
- Sex: Stallion
- Foaled: 1930
- Country: United States
- Colour: Chestnut (color)
- Breeder: Col. Robert L. Baker
- Owner: 1) Ruth Clark Crump; 2) Suzanne Mason
- Trainer: 1) Willie Crump; 2) Thomas P. Hayes (1933); 3) J. Thomas Taylor (1934)
- Record: 38: 14-5-5
- Earnings: $109,315

Major wins
- Hawthorne Juvenile Stakes (1932); Cincinnati Trophy Stakes (1932); Derby Trial Stakes (1933); Suburban Handicap (1935); San Juan Capistrano Handicap (1935); San Antonio Handicap (1935); Bay Meadows Handicap (1935); U.S. Triple Crown wins: Preakness Stakes (1933); Kentucky Derby 2nd (1933)

Awards
- American Champion Three-Year-Old Male Horse (1933)
- Last updated on June 14, 2018

Head Play (April 2, 1930 – December 11, 1954) was an American Thoroughbred racehorse best known for winning the 1933 Preakness Stakes, the second leg of the U.S. Triple Crown series of races and as the horse on the losing end of the "Fighting Finish" of the 1933 Kentucky Derby.

== Early racing career ==
Trainer Willie Crump, a former top jockey, bought Head Play for $500 at a yearling sale and gave him to his wife Ruth to race under her name. At age two, Head Play broke his maiden in his second start. He went on to win the one and one sixteenth mile Hawthorne Juvenile Stakes in December at Hawthorne Race Course in Cicero, Illinois, before being freshened over the winter. In his three-year-old season, with jockey Herb Fisher aboard he won the Derby Trial Stakes at one mile at Churchill Downs on opening weekend. After that impressive win, in which he beat a number of the Kentucky Derby eligibles, the Crumps accepted a $30,000 offer for the colt from Suzanne Mason, wife of construction contractor Silas B. Mason whose consortium built the Grand Coulee Dam. With jockey Fisher on Head Play again, he finished second by a nose to Brokers Tip ridden by Don Meade after a battle between the two jockeys so severe they would both be suspended by the racing authorities.

Convinced that Head Play would have won had it not been for the jockeys antics, his new connections entered Head Play in the $25,000 Preakness Stakes run at a mile and three sixteenth at Baltimore's Pimlico Race Course. In the time leading up to the race, he began uneasy in the paddock, bucking and exhibiting fractious behavior and was unable to be placed in the stall for saddling. In the race, he broke from gate four as the post time 2-1 favorite. He was immediately sent by his jockey Charles Kurtsinger to the outside, shifting across several other paths to the middle of the track. He outran all others, including Kentucky Derby winner Brokers Tip, to the first turn, completing the first quarter mile in :23-3/5. He rated by slowing down the pace on the back stretch but was still in front comfortably. He shook off several challenges from Ladysman and then drew off in the last quarter mile to win by four lengths. He won the Preakness in a final time of 2:02, paying $5.60 to win. The Derby winner, Brokers Tip, finished last in the field of ten. Tom Hayes had taken over as the trainer for the new owner after the Derby and the Preakness win with Head Play marked his second win in the event, having won in 1897 with the colt Paul Kauvar. Only a few months after, Hayes died on August 28, 1933, at his home in Lexington, Kentucky.

== Later racing career ==
Head Play was injured and did not win another race in the remainder of his three-year-old or four-year-old seasons. As a five-year-old, he came back into form from his injury and won four stakes races on separate coasts of the country. Early in 1935, he won both the inaugural running of the San Antonio Handicap in the first week of February at one and one eighth mile on the dirt and the San Juan Capistrano Handicap in the second half of April at the same distance at Santa Anita Park outside Los Angeles in California. Then he won the Bay Meadows Handicap at one and one eighth miles in the San Francisco Area in Northern California at Bay Meadows Racetrack. In May, he ran against the 1934 Kentucky Derby winner, Cavalcade, at Belmont and recorded an upset victory over the younger horse. On the fourth of July weekend, Head Play won the prestigious Suburban Handicap at 1 1/4 miles on the dirt at Belmont Park in New York over Discovery with Cavalcade losing his rider at the start. He won the Derby Week Special at one and one eighth miles at Detroit in mid-June over Stand Pat and Azucar. He bowed slightly after this and never regained his form, racing only twice the next year unsuccessfully.

== Breeding ==
Pedigree of Head Play
Sire My Play bay 1919	Fair Play ch. 1905	Hastings	Spendthrift
Sire My Play bay 1919	Fair Play ch. 1905	Hastings	Cinderella
Sire My Play bay 1919	Fair Play ch. 1905	Fairy Gold	Bend Or
Sire My Play bay 1919	Fair Play ch. 1905	Fairy Gold	Dame Masham
Sire My Play bay 1919	Mahubah bay 1910	Rock Sand	Sainfoin
Sire My Play bay 1919	Mahubah bay 1910	Rock Sand	Roquebrune
Sire My Play bay 1919	Mahubah bay 1910	Merry Token	Merry Hampton
Sire My Play bay 1919	Mahubah bay 1910	Merry Token	Mizpah
Dam Red Head ch. 1923	King Gorin ch. 1913	Transvaal	Commando
Dam Red Head ch. 1923	King Gorin ch. 1913	Transvaal	Royal Rose
Dam Red Head ch. 1923	King Gorin ch. 1913	Ethel Simpson	Deceiver
Dam Red Head ch. 1923	King Gorin ch. 1913	Ethel Simpson	Excellent
Dam Red Head ch. 1923	Pimenta ch. 1918	Light Brigade	Picton
Dam Red Head ch. 1923	Pimenta ch. 1918	Light Brigade	Bridge of Sighs
Dam Red Head ch. 1923	Pimenta ch. 1918	Allspice	Oddfellow
Dam Red Head ch. 1923	Pimenta ch. 1918	Allspice	Witch Hazel
