= Huron Handicap =

Horse race held in New York, US

- Class: Discontinued stakes
- Location: Saratoga Race Course; Saratoga Springs, New York, United States
- Inaugurated: 1901
- Race type: Thoroughbred – Flat racing

Race information
- Distance: 1 3/16 miles (9.5 furlongs)
- Surface: Dirt
- Track: left-handed
- Qualification: Three-year-olds

The Huron Handicap was an American Thoroughbred horse race run between 1901 and 1940 at Saratoga Race Course in Saratoga Springs, New York. Raced on dirt, it was run at a distance of 1 3/16 miles (9.5 furlongs) with the exception of 1914 when the distance was set at 1 1/4 miles (10 furlongs).

== Historical notes ==
The 1920 edition of the Huron Handicap saw William Coe's outstanding filly Cleopatra equal the track record in winning the race under future U.S. Racing Hall of Fame jockey Linus McAtee. While not a major event, the Huron nonetheless drew top horses and was won by other stellar runners such as Roamer, an American Horse of the Year and a U.S. Racing Hall of Fame inductee, The Finn, a 1915 Champion and Belmont Stakes winner, Johren who won the Latonia Derby and the Belmont Stakes, Sarazen, a two-time American Horse of the Year, plus both Whiskery and Reigh Count who each won the Kentucky Derby.

On August 25, 1938, the Huron Handicap was won by a female trainer for the first time in its history. Mary Hirsch, daughter of future U.S. Racing Hall of Fame inductee Max Hirsch, won the race with the colt Thanksgiving owned by another female, Anne Corning. Just 13 days earlier Mary Hirsch won the most important race of her career when she became the first female trainer to ever win the very prestigious Travers Stakes, also with Thanksgiving.

The final running on August 30, 1940, was won by Jacomar, a colt owned by "Cosmetics Queen" Elizabeth Arden. Previously, Jacomar had set a new Aqueduct track record on June 15 of 1:42 4/5 for 1 1/16 miles on dirt in winning the Shevlin Stakes.

== The 1911–1912 statewide shutdown of horse racing ==
On June 11, 1908, the Republican controlled New York Legislature under Governor Charles Evans Hughes passed the Hart–Agnew anti-betting legislation. The owners of Saratoga Race Course, and other racing facilities in New York State, struggled to stay in business without income from betting. Racetrack operators had no choice but to drastically reduce the purse money being paid out which resulted in the Huron Handicap offering a purse in 1908 that was less than one-quarter of what it had been in earlier years. These small purses made horse racing unprofitable and impossible for even the most successful horse owners to continue in business. As such, for the 1909 and 10 racing seasons management of the Saratoga racing facility dropped some of its minor stakes races and used the purse money to bolster its most important events.

In spite of strong opposition by prominent owners such as August Belmont Jr. and Harry Payne Whitney, reform legislators were not happy when they learned that betting was still going on at racetracks between individuals and they had further restrictive legislation passed by the New York Legislature in 1910. The Agnew–Perkins Law, a series of four bills and recorded as the Executive Liability Act, made it possible for racetrack owners and members of its board of directors to be fined and imprisoned if anyone was found betting, even privately, anywhere on their premises. After a 1911 amendment to the law that would limit the liability of owners and directors was defeated in the Legislature, every racetrack in New York State shut down. As a result, the Great Trial Stakes was not run in 1911 and 1912.

Owners, whose horses of racing age had nowhere to go, began sending them, their trainers and their jockeys to race in England and France. Many horses ended their racing careers there and a number remained to become an important part of the European horse breeding industry. Thoroughbred Times reported that more than 1,500 American horses were sent overseas between 1908 and 1913 and of them at least 24 were either past, present, or future Champions. With a February 21, 1913 ruling by the New York Supreme Court, Appellate Division, horse racing and the Huron Handicap returned in 1913.

== Records ==
Speed record:

- 1:56.00 @ 9.5 Furlongs (1 3/16 miles) – Cleopatra (1920) & Maeda (1939)

Most wins by a jockey:

- 2 – Walter Miller (1906, 1907)
- 2 – James Butwell (1914, 1915)
- 2 – Frank Robinson (1917, 1918)
- 2 – Linus McAtee (1920, 1923)
- 2 – Mack Garner (1922, 1929)
- 2 – Sidney Hebert (1931, 1937)

Most wins by a trainer:

- 3 – James G. Rowe Sr. (1917, 1918, 1923)

Most wins by an owner:

- 3 – Harry P. Whitney (1917, 1918, 1927)

== Winners ==
Year	Winner	Age	Jockey	Trainer	Owner	Dist. (Furlongs)	Time	Win$
1940	Jacomar	3	Ruperto Donoso	H. Hugh Dufford	Elizabeth Arden	9.5 F	1:57.40	$3,550
1939	Maeda	3	Basil James	George E. Phillips	Maemere Farm (Dewitt Page)	9.5 F	1:56.00	$3,150
1938	Thanksgiving	3	Eddie Arcaro	Mary Hirsch	Anne C. Corning	9.5 F	1:58.40	$3,375
1937	Sammie	3	Sidney Hebert	Peter W. Coyne	Joseph E. Widener	9.5 F	1:58.60	$2,410
1936	Jean Bart	3	Harry Richards	Preston M. Burch	Walter M. Jeffords Sr.	9.5 F	1:58.60	$2,410
1935	Mantagna	3	Eddie Litzenberger	George E. Phillips	William H. Furst	9.5 F	1:59.20	$2,410
1934	Vicar	3	Tommy Malley	James E. Fitzsimmons	Belair Stud Stable	9.5 F	2:02.00	$2,135
1933	Caesar's Ghost	3	Dominick Bellizzi	Robert Augustus Smith	Brookmeade Stable	9.5 F	2:00.00	$2,135
1932	War Hero	3	John Gilbert	George H. Conway	Glen Riddle Farm	9.5 F	1:57.00	$2,850
1931	Hillsborough	3	Sidney Hebert	Harry M. Unna	Arthur Bartelstein	9.5 F	2:01.80	$3,800
1930	Spinach	3	Charles Kurtsinger	William J. Spiers	William Ziegler Jr.	9.5 F	1:57.60	$3,800
1929	The Nut	3	Mack Garner	Joe Notter	Warm Stable (S. B. Mason & A. W. Hanger)	9.5 F	1:58.00	$4,700
1928	Reigh Count	3	Chick Lang	Bert S. Michell	Fannie Hertz	9.5 F	2:00.80	$4,300
1927	Whiskery	3	Raymond Workman	Fred Hopkins	Harry P. Whitney	9.5 F	1:59.40	$3,800
1926	Crusader	3	Earl Sande	George H. Conway	Glen Riddle Farm	9.5 F	1:59.60	$4,050
1925	Peanuts	3	Frank Coltiletti	George P. Odom	Robert L. Gerry Sr.	9.5 F	1:58.80	$3,000
1924	Sarazen	3	John Maiben	Max Hirsch	Fair Stable	9.5 F	2:02.80	$3,850
1923	Rialto	3	Linus McAtee	James G. Rowe Sr.	Greentree Stable	9.5 F	1:57.60	$3,850
1922	Rockminister	3	Mack Garner	Kay Spence	Montfort Jones	9.5 F	1:57.40	$3,900
1921	Smoke Screen	3	Clarence Kummer	James N. Evans	Gifford A. Cochran	9.5 F	1:58.20	$3,800
1920	Cleopatra	3	Linus McAtee	William H. Karrick	William R. Coe	9.5 F	1:56.00	$2,325
1919	Purchase	3	Willie Knapp	Sam Hildreth	Sam Hildreth	9.5 F	1:59.20	$2,325
1918	Johren	3	Frank Robinson	James G. Rowe Sr.	Harry P. Whitney	9.5 F	1:57.40	$2,075
1917	Rickety	3	Frank Robinson	James G. Rowe Sr.	Harry P. Whitney	9.5 F	2:00.40	$1.925
1916	Spur	3	Johnny Loftus	John H. McCormack	James Butler	9.5 F	1:58.60	$1,425
1915	The Finn	3	James Butwell	Edward W. Heffner	Harry C. Hallenbeck	9.5 F	2:03.00	$1,050
1914	Roamer	3	James Butwell	A. J. Goldsborough	Andrew Miller	10 F	2:06.80	$2,200
1913	Cock O' The Walk	3	J. "Buddy" Glass	John P. Mayberry	Frederick Johnson	9.5 F	1:59.20	$1,630
1912	No races held due to the Hart–Agnew Law.							
1911	No races held due to the Hart–Agnew Law.							
1910	Countless	3	Ted Koerner	John W. May	John G. Greener	9.5 F	1:59.20	$2,375
1909	Choirmaster of Chesterbrook	3	James Mulligan	J. Simon Healy	Edward B. Cassatt	9.5 F	2:06.00	$1,170
1908	Sir John Johnson	3	S. Sweet	William Hayward Jr.	Stephen Sanford	9.5 F	1:58.60	$500
1907	Kennyetto	3	Walter Miller	William Hayward Jr.	John Sanford	9.5 F	2:00.00	$2,300
1906	Content	3	Walter Miller	Thomas Welsh	Newcastle Stable	9.5 F	2:00.00	$1,705
1905	Bedouin	3	Willie Shaw	John Huggins	Herman B. Duryea	9.5 F	2:00.60	$1,795
1904	Fort Hunter	3	Gene Hildebrand	John Dyment Jr.	Nathaniel Dyment	9.5 F	2:01.60	$2,060
1903	Shorthose	3	William E. Haack	Albert G. Weston	Goughacres Stable	9.5 F	2:02.40	$1,985
1902	Sombrero	3	Tommy Burns	Green B. Morris	Green B. Morris	9.5 F	2:04.00	$1.755
1901	The Rhymer	3	Harry Cochran	James J. McLaughlin	John A. Monahan	9.5 F	2:03.00	$1,600
