= Long Branch Stakes =

- Class: Grade III
- Location: Monmouth Park Racetrack; Oceanport, New Jersey, United States
- Inaugurated: 1878
- Race type: Thoroughbred – Flat racing
- Website: www.monmouthpark.com

Race information
- Distance: 1 1/16 miles (8.5 furlongs)
- Surface: Dirt
- Track: left-handed
- Qualification: Three-year-olds
- Weight: Assigned
- Purse: $100,000

The Long Branch Stakes is an American Thoroughbred horse race held annually at Monmouth Park Racetrack in Oceanport, New Jersey. Open to three-year-olds, it is contested on dirt over a distance of 1 1/16 miles (8.5 furlongs). It is generally viewed as a prep race for the Haskell Invitational. The race is named after nearby Long Branch, New Jersey.

First run in 1878, it was raced annually through 1893 as the Long Branch Handicap after which the race track closed its gates. The race was revived in 1947, following the 1946 reopening of the new Monmouth Park. The race was discontinued after the 1958 running—as a handicap, it was not drawing large fields. In 1963, it was restarted as the Long Branch Stakes.

== Past winners ==
The race was run annually from 1878 to 1893 (16 editions), and was later run annually from 1947 to 1958 (12 editions). After a four-year hiatus, the race was resumed in 1963, and has been run annually since then. The 2019 running was the 85th edition of the race.

=== 1963–present ===
Since being resumed in 1963, the race has been open to three-year-olds. In 1963, the distance was three-quarters of a mile (six furlongs). From 1964 through 1989, the distance was one mile, some years run on dirt and some years run on turf. Since 1990, the race has been run at a 1 1/16 mile distance on dirt.

- 2026 – Hedge Ratio (Samuel Marin)
- 2025 – Kentucky Outlaw (Paco Lopez)
- 2024 – Sea Streak (Jairo Rendon)
- 2023 – Howgreatisnate (Jairo Rendon)
- 2022 – Dash Attack (Samuel Marin)
- 2019 – Joevia (Nik Juarez)
- 2018 – Navy Commander (Ángel Arroyo)
- 2017 – Phat Man (Wilmer Garcia)
- 2016 – No Distortion (Gabriel Saez)
- 2015 – Stanford (Joe Bravo)
- 2014 – Irish You Well (Orlando Bacochica)
- 2013 – Micromanage (Joe Bravo)
- 2012 – My Adonis (Elvis Trujillo)
- 2011 – Rattlesnake Bridge (Eddie Castro)
- 2010 – Trappe Shot (Alan Garcia)
- 2009 – Atomic Rain (Joe Bravo)
- 2008 – Truth Rules (Stewart Elliott)
- 2007 – First Defence (Javier Castellano)
- 2006 – Praying for Cash (José A. Vélez Jr.)
- 2005 – Park Avenue Ball (Chris DeCarlo)
- 2004 – Lion Heart (Joe Bravo)
- 2003 – Max Forever (José C. Ferrer)
- 2002 – Puck (Manuel Aguilar)
- 2001 – Burning Roma (Rick Wilson)
- 2000 – Thistyranthasclass (José A. Vélez Jr.)
- 1999 – Ghost Story
- 1998 – Favorite Trick
- 1997 – Jules (sire of Peace Rules)
- 1996 – Dr. Caton
- 1995 – Pyramid Peak
- 1994 – Meadow Flight
- 1993 – Bert's Bubbleator
- 1992 – Scudan (By 13 3/4 lengths over odds-on choice)
- 1991 – Sultry Song
- 1990 – Tees Prospect
- 1989 – Orange Sunshine
- 1988 – Mi Selecto
- 1987 – I'm So Bad
- 1986 – Lyphard Line
- 1985 – Bea Quality
- 1984 – Dr Schwarztsman
- 1983 – Smart Style (1st division), Princilian (2nd division)
- 1982 – Prince Westport (1st division), Play for Love (2nd division)
- 1981 – De La Rose (filly)
- 1980 – No Bend
- 1979 – Commodore
- 1978 – Mac Diarmida
- 1977 – P R Man
- 1976 – Pastry
- 1975 – Lee Gary
- 1974 – Silver Florin (1st Division), Hat Full (2nd Division)
- 1973 – Bemo
- 1972 – Deep Cut
- 1971 – Gleaming
- 1970 – Summer Resort
- 1969 – North Flight
- 1968 – Royal Trace
- 1967 – Blasting Charge (1st Division), Fort Marcy (2nd Division)
- 1966 – Assagai
- 1965 – Carry Forward
- 1964 – Phantom Shot
- 1963 – Gray Pet (Steve Brooks)

=== Mid-20th century ===
These races were run over a distance of 1 1/16 miles, open to three-year-olds and up.

- 1958 – Little Hermit (Karl Korte)
- 1957 – Beau Fond (Howard Grant)
- 1956 – Skipper Bill (Joe Regalbuto)
- 1955 – Revolt (Henry Moreno)
- 1954 – Brown Booter (Bill Hartack)
- 1953 – Bit O Fate (Nick Shuk)
- 1952 – General Staff (James Stout)
- 1951 – Sheilas Reward (Dave Gorman)
- 1950 – Reveille (Ovie Scurlock)
- 1949 – Whirling Fox (Bobby Bernhardt)
- 1948 – Beauchef (Ruperto Donoso)
- 1947 – Polynesian (W. D. Wright)

=== 19th century ===
These races were run at a distance of 1 1/4 mile (10 furlongs), and not restricted to three-year-olds.

- 1893 – Candelabra
- 1892 – Demuth
- 1891 – Eon
- 1890 – Reporter
- 1889 – Tarragon
- 1888 – Belvidere
- 1887 – Hidalgo
- 1886 – Rupert
- 1885 – Richmond
- 1884 – Eolist
- 1883 – Monitor
- 1882 – Monitor
- 1881 – Ripple
- 1880 – Report
- 1879 – Jericho
- 1878 – Little Reb
