= John Maiben =

American jockey

Personal information
- Born: February 13, 1898 Mount Pleasant, Utah
- Died: July 28, 1969 (aged 71) San Diego County, California
- Occupation: Jockey

Horse racing career
- Sport: Horse racing

Major racing wins
- Alabama Stakes (1924); Brooklyn Handicap (1924, 1928); Dwyer Stakes (1924, 1927); Empire City Derby (1924); Fleetwing Handicap (1924); Gazelle Stakes (1924); Huron Handicap (1924); Jerome Handicap (1924, 1925); Lawrence Realization Stakes (1924); Manhattan Handicap (1924); Southampton Handicap (1924); Aberdeen Stakes (1925); Breeders' Futurity Stakes (1925); Chesapeake Stakes (1925); Delaware Handicap (1925); Jockey Club Gold Cup (1925, 1929); Pimlico Fall Serial #3 (1925); Tremont Stakes (1925, 1926); Juvenile Stakes (1926); Latonia Championship Stakes (1926); Oakdale Handicap (1926); Sanford Stakes (1926); Scarsdale Handicap (1926, 1927); Champlain Handicap (1927); Connaught Cup Handicap (1927, 1929); Durham Cup Handicap (1927); Hopeful Stakes (1927); Saratoga Cup (1927, 1929); Jockey Club Cup Handicap (1927); Washington Handicap (1927); Autumn Stakes (1928); Hawthorne Gold Cup Handicap (1928); Breeders' Stakes (1929); Coaching Club American Oaks (1929); Cowdin Stakes (1929); King Edward Gold Cup (1929); Saratoga Handicap (1929); Toronto Cup Handicap (1930) U.S. Triple Crown wins: Preakness Stakes (1926)

Significant horses
- Display, Exterminator, Gallant Fox, Ladkin, Sarazen, Sir Harry, Sun Beau

John Maiben (February 13, 1898 - July 28, 1969) was "one of America's top jockeys during the 1920s" in the sport of Thoroughbred horse racing who won the 1926 Preakness Stakes, run that year as the first leg of the U.S. Triple Crown series.

Maiben was a late comer to the professional jockey trade, winning his first race at age 23 in 1922 at Thorncliffe Park Raceway in Toronto, Canada. He retired from riding in 1937 but remained in the industry as a racetrack official. In 1953 he was the presiding steward at Playfair Race Course in Spokane, Washington.
