= Fleetwing Handicap =

- Location: Empire City Race Track (1908-1914, 1916, 1942); Belmont Park (1915); Jamaica Race Course 1943-1953
- Inaugurated: 1908
- Race type: Thoroughbred - Flat racing

Race information
- Distance: 1 1/16 miles
- Surface: Dirt
- Track: left-handed
- Qualification: Three-year-olds and up

The Fleetwing Handicap was an American Thoroughbred race for horses age three and older that was run between 1908 and 1953. Inaugurated at Empire City Race Track in Yonkers, New York it remained there through 1942 with the exception of 1915 when it was temporarily hosted by Belmont Park. In 1942 the Empire City Racetrack ended Thoroughbred racing, reverting to its origins as a facility exclusively for harness racing. As such, in 1943 the Fleeting Handicap was transferred to the Jamaica Race Course in Jamaica, Queens, New York.

== Historical notes ==
The inaugural running of the Fleetwing took place on August 27, 1908 and was won by Richard Carman's Magazine who returned to win it for a second time in 1910.

Some of the top level horses of their era that won the Fleetwing include Jack Atkin (1909), Hall of Fame inductee Sarazen (1924 and 1925), Tryster (1922), Polydor (1929), Flying Heels (1931), Fighting Fox who broke the Empire City track record while winning the 1939 race, and Sheilas Reward who in his 1950 victory at Jamaica set another new track record.

== Records ==
Speed record:

- 1:07.40 @ 5¾ furlongs: Fighting Fox (1939) & Doublrab (1942)
- 1:09.40 @ 6 furlongs: Sheilas Reward (1950)

Most wins:

- Magazine (1908, 1910)
- Sarazen (1924, 1925)
- The Beasel (1930, 1932)

Most wins by a jockey:

- 3 - James Stout (1939, 1943, 1944)

Most wins by a trainer:

- 3 - Max Hirsch (1924, 1925, 1928)
- 3 - James E. Fitzsimmons (1939, 1943, 1944)

Most wins by an owner:

- 3 - Belair Stud (1939, 1943, 1944)

== Winners ==
Year	Winner	Age	Jockey	Trainer	Owner	Dist. (furlongs)	Time	Win $
1953	Eatontown	7	Chris Rogers	Betty Block Roberts	Betty Block Roberts	6 f	1:11.00	$14,950
1952	Tea-Maker	9	Hedley Woodhouse	J. Dallet Byers	F. Ambrose Clark	6 f	1:10.20	$14,600
1951	More Sun	4	Hedley Woodhouse	Preston M. Burch	Brookmeade Stable	6 f	1:11.40	$15,200
1950	Sheilas Reward	3	Fernando Fernandez	Eugene Jacobs	Louis Lazare	6 f	1:09.40	$15,425
1949	Mangohick	5	Douglas Dodson	Casey Hayes	Christopher Chenery	6 f	1:12.20	$15,800
1948	Buzfuz	6	Conn McCreary	Joseph B. Rosen	Mose Rauzin	6 f	1:12.20	$20,200
1947	Brown Mogul	4	Eric Guerin	John B. Theall	Joe W. Brown	6 f	1:11.80	$15,700
1946	Scholarship	4	Arnold Kirkland	Kenneth L. W. Force Jr.	George G. Gilbert Jr.	6 f	1:10.40	$8,500
1945	First Fiddle	6	Johnny Longden	Edward Mulrenan	Mrs. Edward Mulrenan	6 f	1:11.00	$8,025
1944	Bossuet	4	James Stout	James E. Fitzsimmons	Belair Stud	6 f	1:11.00	$7,617
1943	Apache	4	James Stout	James E. Fitzsimmons	Belair Stud	6 f	1:11.60	$6,225
1942	Doublrab	4	Billie Thompson	Harris Brown	Lillian Christopher	5.75 f	1:07.40	$4,575
1941	Roman	4	Don Meade	Daniel E. Stewart	Joseph E. Widener	5.75 f	1:08.20	$5,350
1940	He Did	7	Eddie Arcaro	J. Thomas Taylor	W. Arnold Hanger	5.75 f	1:08.20	$5,050
1939	Fighting Fox	4	James Stout	James E. Fitzsimmons	Belair Stud	5.75 f	1:07.40	$5,050
1938	Preeminent	6	Nick Wall	Duval A. Headley	Hal Price Headley	5.75 f	1:09.40	$5,850
1937	Jay Jay	4	John Gilbert	Frank Garrett	Howard Bruce	5.75 f	1:08.40	$5,200
1936	Mower	3	Eddie Yager	George M. Odom	Elsie Cassatt Stewart	5.75 f	1:08.20	$3,950
1933	1935	Race not held						
1932	The Beasel	5	Earl Sande	J. P. "Sammy" Smith	J. P. "Sammy" Smith	5.75 f	1:10.00	$2,320
1931	Flying Heels	4	Raymond Workman	J. Simon Healy	John J. Curtis	5.75 f	1:09.60	$3,420
1930	The Beasel	3	Willie Kelsay	Henry McDaniel	Gifford A. Cochran	5.75 f	1:09.20	$3,470
1929	Polydor	4	Mack Garner	William J. Speirs	William Ziegler Jr.	5.75 f	1:09.20	$3,700
1928	Happy Argo	5	George Fields	Max Hirsch	Kershaw Stable	5.75 f	1:09.60	$4,190
1927	Sweepster	3	Laverne Fator	Sam Hildreth	Rancocas Stable	5.75 f	1:09.40	$4,170
1926	Noah	4	Linus McAtee	James G. Rowe Sr.	Harry Payne Whitney	5.75 f	1:08.80	$3,910
1925	Sarazen	4	Earl Sande	Max Hirsch	Virginia Fair Vanderbilt	5.75 f	1:08.40	
1924	Sarazen	3	John Maiben	Max Hirsch	Virginia Fair Vanderbilt	5.75 f	1:08.40	$4,490
1923	Runantell	4	Clarence Turner	Thomas Welsh	Joseph E. Widener	5.75 f	1:08.80	$4,910
1922	Tryster	4	Lewis Norris	James G. Rowe Sr.	Harry Payne Whitney	5.75 f	1:09.60	$4,530
1921	Dominique	4	Laverne Fator	Sam Hildreth	Rancocas Stable	5.75 f	1:09.60	$4,230
1920	Irish Dream	3	Clarence Turner	Charles White	Kilrane Stable	5.75 f	1:09.40	$2,770
1919	Ticklish	3	Charles Fairbrother	Richard E. Watkins	Richard E. Watkins	5.75 f	1:08.80	$2,325
1918	Old Koenig	5	Lavelle Ensor	George Ziegler	Beverwyck Stable	5.75 f	1:07.80	$2,325
1917	Top o' th' Morning	5	Merritt Buxton	William Shields	Paul Powers	6 f (±)	1:10.20	$2,325
1916	He Will	4	Roscoe Troxler	Louis Feustel	Louis Feustel	6 f	1:12.00	$1,345
1915	Phosphor	3	Johnny Loftus	William H. Karrick	Schuyler L. Parsons	6 f	1:11.40	$1,250
1914	Ten Point	4	James Butwell	Anthony L. Aste	Anthony L. Aste	6 f	1:13.00	$1,355
1911	1913	Race not held						
1910	Magazine	5	George Archibald	Frank Ernest	Richard F. Carman	6 f	1:12.00	$1,150
1909	Jack Atkin	5	Vincent Powers	John Powers	Barney Schreiber	6 f	1:12.00	$1,165
1908	Magazine	3	Dalton McCarthy	Frank Regan	Richard F. Carman	6 f	1:15.20	$2,370
