= Cleopatra (horse) =

American-bred Thoroughbred racehorse

- Sire: Corcyra
- Grandsire: Polymelus
- Dam: Gallice
- Damsire: Gallinule
- Sex: Filly
- Foaled: 1917
- Country: United States
- Colour: Chestnut
- Breeder: Claiborne Farm
- Owner: William R. Coe
- Trainer: William H. Karrick
- Record: 20: 8-6-4
- Earnings: US$$55,937

Major wins
- Champagne Stakes (1919); Alabama Stakes (1920); Coaching Club American Oaks (1920); Pimlico Oaks (1920); Huron Handicap (1920); Sun Bonnet Handicap (1920); Latonia Championship Stakes (1920)

Awards
- American Champion Three-Year-Old Filly (1920)
- Last updated on July 9, 2019

Cleopatra (foaled 1917 in Kentucky) was an American Champion Thoroughbred racehorse. The filly's sire was Corcyra, a son of three-time the Leading sire in Great Britain and Ireland Polymelus. Her dam was Gallice, a daughter of Gallinule. Cleopatra is probably best remembered for her easy victory in the second running of the Pimlico Oaks on May 17, 1920. She was retrospectively named the American Champion Three-Year-Old Filly for 1920 after a season that included victories in the Coaching Club American Oaks, Alabama Stakes, and Latonia Championship Stakes.

== Racing career ==
=== Two-year-old season ===
Cleopatra broke her maiden race in her first outing. In her second race, she raced against males in the Hopeful Stakes. In that race at Saratoga Race Course, she placed second to Man o' War in the six furlong sprint. Cleopatra's next start came in the prestigious Champagne Stakes. She won the mile race on dirt going away over males, including the colt Upset.

=== Three-year-old season ===
At age three, Cleopatra strung together six stakes wins and finished in the money in 13 of 15 starts. In April, she finished second in the Ladies Handicap to inaugural Pimlico Oaks winner Milkmaid at Aqueduct Racetrack. On the first Saturday of May, Cleopatra ran 15th as the only filly in the 1920 Kentucky Derby.

In mid-May, trainer William Karrick and owner William R. Coe decided to wheel Cleopatra back 13 days after the Derby and run in the $6,000 the Pimlico Oaks. In only the second running of that race, she was sent off as the morning line favorite and won the mile and a sixteenth race in 1:53.00 flat against a field of nine stakes-winning fillies, including runner-up Arethusa and Rubidium.

While not a top level race, nonetheless Cleopatra's performance in winning the Sun Bonnet Handicap over older mares in June at Belmont Park was described by the Daily Racing Form as sensational.

In July, Cleopatra won the Coaching Club American Oaks, setting a new track record at Belmont Park for the 11-furlong race in 2:18.80. Early in the Saratoga meet, she won the Huron Handicap. In late August, she won the prestigious Alabama Stakes at Saratoga Race Course. In the late autumn, Cleopatra came back to win the Latonia Championship Stakes (in what is now Turfway Park), setting a new track record for the marathon 1 3/4 mile race in 2:56.80. It would turn out to be her last race and she was retired to stand for her owner as a broodmare.

Cleopatra's record in 1920 was 6-5-3 in 15 starts. That year, she accumulated the fourth highest annual earnings for a racehorse ever. She was retrospectively named American Champion Three-Year-Old Filly for 1920 by The Blood-Horse magazine.
