= Victorian (horse) =

American-bred Thoroughbred racehorse

- Sire: Whisk Broom
- Grandsire: Broomstick
- Dam: Prudery
- Damsire: Peter Pan
- Sex: Stallion
- Foaled: 1925
- Country: United States
- Color: Bay
- Breeder: Harry P. Whitney
- Owner: Harry P. Whitney, Warm Stable (Silas B. Mason & Arnold Hanger)
- Trainer: James G. Rowe Jr., J. Thomas Taylor
- Record: 39: 18-9-1
- Earnings: $253,425

Major wins
- Brookdale Handicap (1928); Champlain Handicap (1928); Withers Stakes (1928); Manhattan Handicap (1928); W. P. Burch Memorial Handicap (1929); Agua Caliente Handicap (1930) Triple Crown wins: Preakness Stakes (1928)
- Last updated on July 23, 2020

Victorian (1925–1934) was an American Thoroughbred racehorse that was bred in Kentucky. He was bred and raced by Harry P. Whitney and is best known as the winner of the 1928 Preakness Stakes in which he was ridden by future Hall of Fame jockey Sonny Workman.

== New owners ==
In April 1929 the Warm Stable racing partnership of Silas Mason and Arnold Hanger purchased Victorian from Harry Whitney as part of a three-horse deal. A four-year old at the time, he was acquired primarily for breeding purposes. For the Warm Stable, Victorian raced into 1930 under trainer J. Thomas Taylor. Among his wins, he captured the 1929 W. P. Burch Memorial Handicap at Bowie Race Track and in 1930 the Agua Caliente Handicap in Tijuana, Mexico, which carried a guaranteed purse of $100,000, an amount second only to that offered to the winner of the Belmont Futurity Stakes.

When his racing career ended, Victorian proved reasonably successful as a sire while standing at Silas Mason's Duntreath Farm in Lexington, Kentucky. His best runners included 1937 Junior Champion Stakes winner Can't Wait, and the 1936 Santa Anita Derby winner He Did. Victorian was the broodmare sire of 1948 Kentucky Oaks winner Challe Anne.^{[4]} His stud career was cut short when he died on July 30, 1934, from an intestinal obstruction having sired less than three full crops.

== Breeding ==
Pedigree of Victorian
Sire Whisk Broom II ch. 1907	Broomstick bay 1901	Ben Brush	Bramble
Sire Whisk Broom II ch. 1907	Broomstick bay 1901	Ben Brush	Roseville
Sire Whisk Broom II ch. 1907	Broomstick bay 1901	Elf	Galliard
Sire Whisk Broom II ch. 1907	Broomstick bay 1901	Elf	Sylvabelle
Sire Whisk Broom II ch. 1907	Audience ch. 1901	Sir Dixon	Billet
Sire Whisk Broom II ch. 1907	Audience ch. 1901	Sir Dixon	Jaconet
Sire Whisk Broom II ch. 1907	Audience ch. 1901	Sallie McClelland	Hindoo
Sire Whisk Broom II ch. 1907	Audience ch. 1901	Sallie McClelland	Red and Blue
Dam Prudery drk.brn 1918	Peter Pan I bay 1904	Commando	Domino
Dam Prudery drk.brn 1918	Peter Pan I bay 1904	Commando	Emma C.
Dam Prudery drk.brn 1918	Peter Pan I bay 1904	Cinderella	Hermit
Dam Prudery drk.brn 1918	Peter Pan I bay 1904	Cinderella	Mazurka
Dam Prudery drk.brn 1918	Polly Flinders bay 1912	Burgomaster	Hamburg
Dam Prudery drk.brn 1918	Polly Flinders bay 1912	Burgomaster	Hurley Burley
Dam Prudery drk.brn 1918	Polly Flinders bay 1912	Slippers	Meddler
Dam Prudery drk.brn 1918	Polly Flinders bay 1912	Slippers	Cinderella (family: 21-a)
