= Bay Shore Handicap =

- Class: Discontinued stakes
- Location: Aqueduct Racetrack; Queens, New York, USA
- Inaugurated: 1925 - 1955
- Race type: Thoroughbred - Flat racing

Race information
- Distance: 7 furlongs
- Track: Dirt, left-handed
- Qualification: Three-years & older

The Bay Shore Handicap is a discontinued Thoroughbred horse race run from 1925 through 1955 at Aqueduct Racetrack in Queens, New York City. The race was open to horses age three and older and run on dirt. From 1956 to 1959 there was no Bay Shore Handicap but in 1960 Aqueduct Racetrack created the Bay Shore Handicap/Stakes as a race for three-year-olds.

The 1940 race was won by Jacomar, recorded as being owned by Mrs. E. Graham Lewis. Better known as the highly successful cosmetics magnate Elizabeth Arden, she would establish Maine Chance Farm three years later and build it into one of the most successful breeding and racing operations of that era.

The 1943 and 1944 Bay Shore Handicap winners, Wait A Bit and Brownie, were two of the three horses involved in the only triple dead heat on record in a Thoroughbred stakes race when they joined Bossuet to win the 1944 Carter Handicap at Aqueduct Racetrack.

== Records ==
Speed record: (at 7 furlongs)

- 1:22.40 - Wait A Bit (1943)

Most wins:

- No horse ever won this race more than once

Most wins by a jockey:

- 3 - Eric Guerin (1944, 1949, 1952)

Most wins by a trainer:

- 3 - James E. Fitzsimmons (1929, 1933, 1945)

Most wins by an owner:

- 2 - Alfred G. Vanderbilt II (1949, 1952)
- 2 - Belair Stud (1933, 1945)
- 2 - Greentree Stable (1939, 1948)
- 2 - Rancocas Stable (1925, 1927)
- 2 - William L. Brann (1941, 1946)

== Winners ==
Year	Winner	Age	Jockey	Trainer	Owner	Dist. (F)	Time
1955	Red Hannigan	4	Eddie Arcaro	Homer C. Pardue	Woodley Lane Farm	7 F	1:24.00
1954	Joe Jones	4	Conn McCreary	Hirsch Jacobs	Ethel D. Jacobs	7 F	1:23.20
1953	Squared Away	6	James Nichols	Carey Winfrey	Jan Winfrey Burke	7 F	1:23.80
1952	Next Move	5	Eric Guerin	Bill Winfrey	Alfred G. Vanderbilt II	7 F	1:24.00
1951	Sheilas Reward	4	Dave Gorman	Gene Jacobs	Mrs. Louis Lazare	7 F	1:23.40
1950	Piet	5	Nick Combest	R. Emmett Potts	BoMar Stable	7 F	1:23.20
1949	Loser Weeper	4	Eric Guerin	Bill Winfrey	Alfred G. Vanderbilt II	7 F	1:25.00
1948	Coincidence	6	Ted Atkinson	John M. Gaver Sr.	Greentree Stable	7 F	1:26.40
1947	Rippey	4	Ovie Scurlock	William M. Booth	William G. Helis	7 F	1:24.00
1946	Gallorette	4	Job Dean Jessop	Edward A. Christmas	William L. Brann	7 F	1:23.40
1945	Apache	6	James Stout	James E. Fitzsimmons	Belair Stud	7 F	1:24.00
1944	Brownie	5	Eric Guerin	John B. Theall	Joe W. Brown	7 F	1:24.00
1943	Wait A Bit	4	Wayne Wright	Matthew P. Brady	William Ziegler Jr.	7 F	1:22.40
1942	Salto	3	Warren Mehrtens	Max Hirsch	King Ranch	7 F	1:23.20
1941	Pictor	4	George Woolf	Frank Walker	William L. Brann	7 F	1:23.80
1940	Jacomar	3	Ruperto Donoso	Albert B. (Alex) Gordon	Mrs. E. Graham Lewis	7 F	1:24.00
1939	Third Degree	3	Eddie Arcaro	John M. Gaver Sr.	Greentree Stable	6.5 F	1:16.60
1938	The Fighter	5	Basil James	Edward L. Snyder	William F. Morgan	6.5 F	1:17.60
1937	He Did	4	Lester Balaski	J. Thomas Taylor	W. Arnold Hanger	6.5 F	1:18.00
1936	Emileo	3	Ira Hanford	C. H. "Pat" Knebelkamp	Orienta Stable	6.5 F	1:18.00
1935	Miss Merriment	4	Raymond Workman	J. P. "Sammy" Smith	Dorwood Stable (Victor Emanuel)	6 F	1:11.40
1934	Open Range	3	Eddie Litzenberger	George E. Phillips	William Graham	6 F	1:12.80
1933	Dominus	3	James Stout	James E. Fitzsimmons	Belair Stud	8 F	1:38.20
1932	Halcyon	4	Alfred Robertson	T. J. Healey	C. V. Whitney	7 F	1:24.00
1931	Mr. Sponge	4	Mack Garner	Henry McDaniel	Joseph E. Widener	7 F	1:25.60
1930	Black Majesty	3	Charles Kurtsinger	Bennett W. Creech	William R. Coe	7 F	1:24.60
1929	Distraction	4	James H. Burke	James E. Fitzsimmons	Wheatley Stable	7 F	1:24.20
1928	Buddy Bauer	4	Anthony Pascuma	Herbert J. Thompson	Edward R. Bradley	7 F	1:24.60
1927	Black Curl	3	Frank Catrone	Sam Hildreth	Rancocas Stable	7 F	1:26.80
1926	Backbone	4	Linus McAtee	James G. Rowe Sr.	Harry Payne Whitney	7 F	1:23.40
1925	Superlette	3	Laverne Fator	Sam Hildreth	Rancocas Stable	7 F	1:24.20
