= Marianao =

- Municipality of Havana
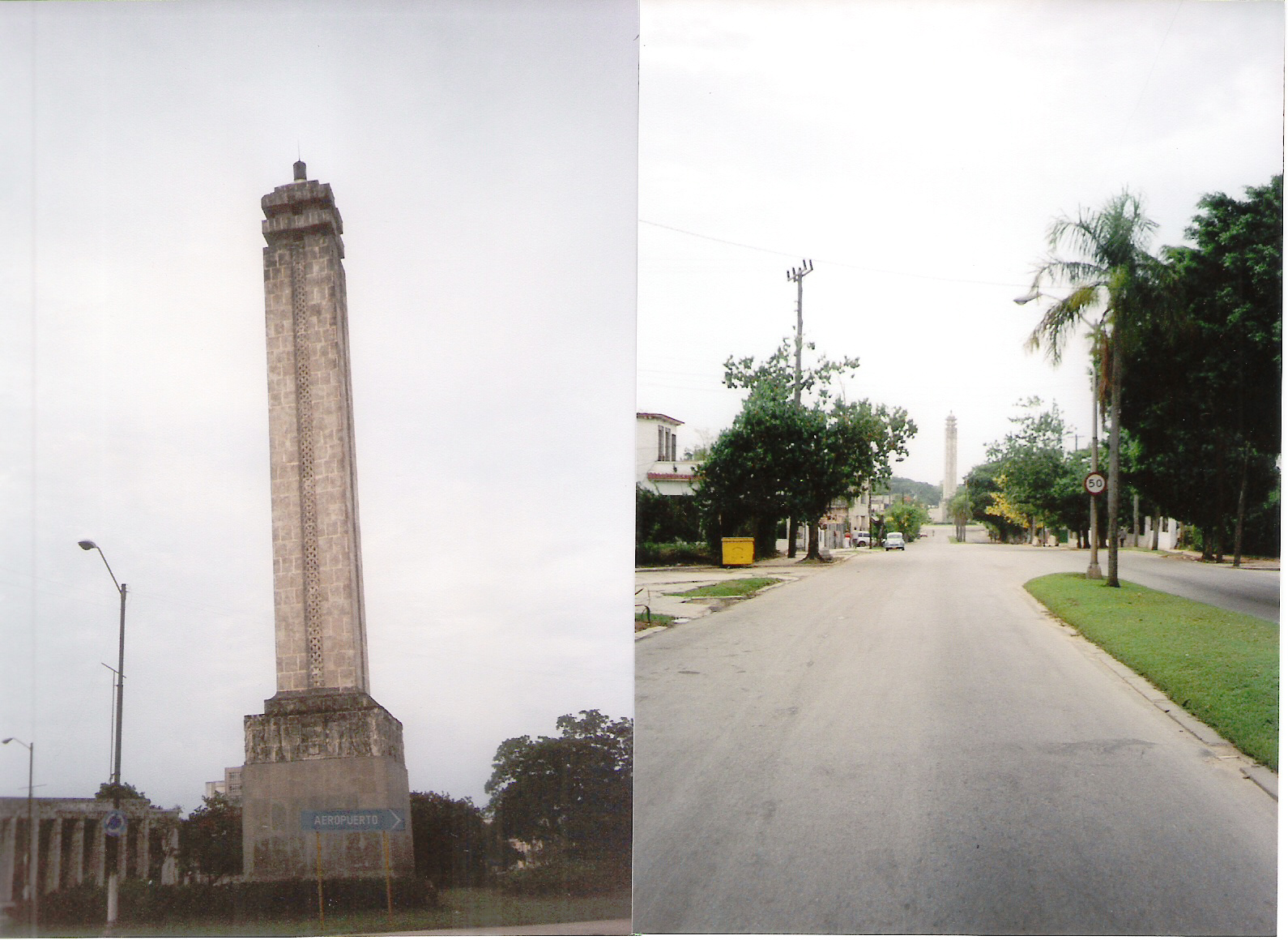
- "El Obelisco", Carlos J. Finlay Memorial

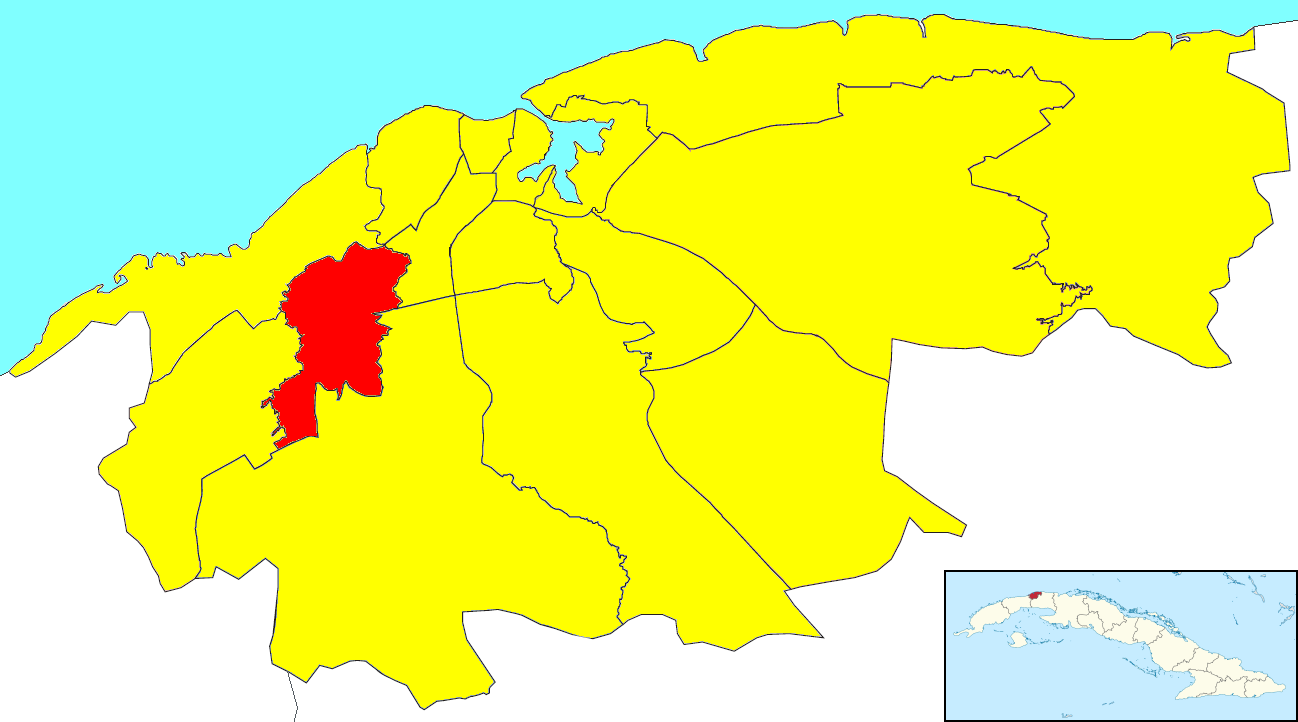
- Location of Marianao in Havana
- Coordinates: 23°05′0″N 82°26′0″W
- Country: Cuba
- Province: La Habana
- Wards (Consejos Populares): CAI-Los Ángeles, Libertad, Pocito-Palmas, Pogoloti-Belén-Finlay, Santa Felicia, Zamora-Cocosolo

Area
  - Total: 22 km^{2} (8.5 sq mi)

Population (2022)
  - Total: 134,057
  - Density: 6,100/km^{2} (16,000/sq mi)
- Time zone: UTC-5 (EST)
- Area code: +53-7

Marianao is one of the 15 municipalities or boroughs (municipios in Spanish) in the city of Havana, Cuba. It lies 10 kilometres southwest of the original city of Havana, with which it is connected by the Marianao railway. In 2022 the municipality had a population of 134,057. Marianao is on a range of hills of about 1500 above sea level and is noted for its salubrious climate. The city dates back to 1830.

== Overview ==
As Havana expanded during the 1930s and 1940s, Marianao became a suburb of the city.

A famous landmark is the monument built to honor Carlos Juan Finlay, a doctor who helped eradicate yellow fever in Cuba in the 19th century. It is shaped like a syringe. The monument is at the junction of Calles 100 and 31, close to several major hospitals.

Marianao is home to the famous Tropicana Club and was home to the Oriental Park Racetrack. In 1928 Chicagoan gangster Al Capone opened a pool hall near the racetrack, but it closed not long after.

One of the most notable foods made in Marianao is "Pollo A La Barbacoa"

== Personalities ==
- Alicia Alonso, prima ballerina assoluta
- Camilo Marin, jockey agent
- Maria Teresa, Grand Duchess of Luxembourg, spouse of Henri, Grand Duke of Luxembourg
- Jorge Enrique González Pacheco, poet and cultural entrepreneur
- Luis Tiant, baseball player

== Twin towns ==
- Carmen (Campeche, Mexico)
- Zapopan (Jalisco, Mexico)
