= Doublrab =

American Thoroughbred racehorse

- Sire: Sherab
- Grandsire: Tetratema
- Dam: Double Shamrock
- Damsire: Double Entendre
- Sex: Stallion
- Foaled: 1938
- Country: United States
- Color: Gray
- Breeder: Chappel Brothers (Philip M. & Earl J. Chappel)
- Owner: Chappel Brothers; Frank Campagna; Lillian Christopher
- Trainer: J. C. Humes; T. A. Janicki; Harris B. Brown
- Record: 101: 25-20-17
- Earnings: US$84,842

Major wins
- Colinsville Handicap (1941); Army and Navy Handicap (1942); Bristol Handicap (1942); Carter Handicap (1942); Fleetwing Handicap (1942); Narragansett Spring Handicap (1942); New Rochelle Handicap (1942); Prince George Autumn Handicap (1942); Wilmington Handicap (1942); W. P. Burch Memorial Handicap (1942); Jamaica Handicap (1944); Massachusetts Governor's Handicap (1944)

Doublrab (foaled 1938 in Illinois) was an American Thoroughbred racehorse that broke one track record and equaled two others when trained by former undertaker Harris Brown.

== Background ==
Doublrab was sired by Sherab, an English foal bred and raced by the Aga Khan III. One of the most successful Thoroughbred breeders and owners in the history of English racing, the Aga Khan III was British flat racing Champion Owner thirteen times. A son of Tetratema, a top class runner and a Leading sire in Great Britain and Ireland, Sherab had little success racing in England and was sold to American interests who followed the example of the very prominent breeder C. V. Whitney who held Tetratema in high regard as a stallion and had imported many of his progeny to the United States.

Doublrab was bred at the Rockford, Illinois farm of Thoroughbred racing enthusiasts, the Chappel Brothers. Philip Chappel and his younger brother Earl were the owners of a successful pet food company widely known for its Ken-L Ration brand. However, the year Doublrab was born the Chappel's dissatisfaction with their breeding results to date saw them make the decision to sell off their entire bloodstock and start over with different bloodlines. At their dispersal, Doublrab was sold to Frank Campagna for only $100.

== Racing career ==
Sent to the track as a two-year-old in 1940, Doublrab won two of eleven starts and earned $1,010. At three, competing at Sportsman's Park Racetrack in Chicago, Doublrab finished second in both the six and one-half furlong Grant Park Purse and the five furlong Arlington Heights Purse. Race conditioned by Campagna's new trainer, T. A. Janicki, on June 11, 1941, Doublrab won the Colinsville Handicap, a six furlong event at Fairmount Park Racetrack in Collinsville, Illinois. At the same track, a few days later he won again in another six furlong handicap. Racing success was modest for the remainder of the year but over the winter the colt had come to the attention of Harris Brown, the successful trainer of a stable owned by Lillian Christopher of Miami, Florida whose husband was a wealthy automobile dealer and real estate investor.

== New owner, trainer, jockey ==
On behalf of his employer, at the end of March 1942 Harris Brown made an offer of $6,000 for the now four-year-old Doublrab which was quickly accepted. A new trainer and new training regimen, along with a new jockey in the form of Billie Thompson, saw Doublrab have an outstanding four-year-old campaign in 1942.

=== Track records ===
Tetratema's offspring were notable for their speed and although Doublrab won at distances as long as a mile and one-eighth, all three of his track record performances were at different sprint distances and Billie Thompson was the jockey each of those record runs. Thompson's handling of Doublrab drew praise from the widely respected Daily Racing Form which told its readers that "If there was a perfect combination at Aqueduct it was Doublrab and Thompson".

June 13, 1942:
Doublrab defeated the 1941 U.S. Triple Crown winner Whirlaway while equaling the Aqueduct track record in winning the seven furlong Carter Handicap.

June 27, 1942
Winning his fourth straight race in the June 27, 1942 Army and Navy Handicap, Doublrab broke another Aqueduct track record, this time for six furlongs with a clocking of 1:10 2/5. In doing so, he beat a strong field that included C. V. Whitney's Parasang, George Widener's Overdrawn as well as Imperatrice, owned by William H. LaBoyteaux.

On July 18, 1942, Doublrab equaled the track record with a time of 1:07 2-5 for 5 3/4 furlongs when winning the Fleetwing Handicap at Empire City Race Track.

In addition to these track record wins, that year Doublrab also won the W. P. Burch Memorial Handicap and Prince George Autumn Handicap at Bowie Race Track, both the Bristol and Spring Handicaps at Narragansett Park, the New Rochelle Handicap at Empire City Race Track and the Wilmington Handicap at Delaware Park Racetrack.

Doublrab raced in 1943 and 1944 but did not match his 1942 success, winning only the Jamaica Handicap and the Massachusetts Governor's Handicap before being retired to stud where he met with limited success as a breeding stallion.

== Pedigree ==
Pedigree of Doublrab, gray stallion, 1938
Sire Sherab	Tetratema	The Tetrarch	Roi Herode
Sire Sherab	Tetratema	The Tetrarch	Vahren
Sire Sherab	Tetratema	Scotch Gift	Symington
Sire Sherab	Tetratema	Scotch Gift	Maund
Sire Sherab	Sherry	Maintenon	Le Sagittaire
Sire Sherab	Sherry	Maintenon	Marcia
Sire Sherab	Sherry	Sweetie	William the Third
Sire Sherab	Sherry	Sweetie	Sweetnule
Dam Double Shamrock	Double Entendre	Bachelor's Double	Tredennis
Dam Double Shamrock	Double Entendre	Bachelor's Double	Lady Bawn
Dam Double Shamrock	Double Entendre	Equitable	St. Frusquin
Dam Double Shamrock	Double Entendre	Equitable	Themis
Dam Double Shamrock	Avisack	Leonardo	Sweep
Dam Double Shamrock	Avisack	Leonardo	Ethel Pace
Dam Double Shamrock	Avisack	Bastante	Oddfellow
Dam Double Shamrock	Avisack	Bastante	Half-A-Sovereign (family: 8-j)
