= Camilo Marin =

American sports agent (1913–1988)

Camilo Marin (January 6, 1913 – December 1, 1988) was a Cuban-born jockey's agent who is widely regarded as one of horse racing's most successful agents.

Marin began his career in his native Cuba, working as a groom and an exercise rider at the Oriental Park Racetrack, in Havana. In 1935, he signed on as the agent for Fernando Fernández, and the rider was Cuban champion for the next seven years. In 1943, the pair moved to Mexico City to compete at Hipodromo de Las Americas, and Fernández led the nation's riders there for three years straight. When a riding contract for Mexican president Avila Camacho expired, the pair headed to the United States, where Fernandez became a leading rider on the East Coast circuit until 1953. Retiring that same year, Fernandez ranked seventh on the list of world's winningest riders, with over 2,500 career wins.

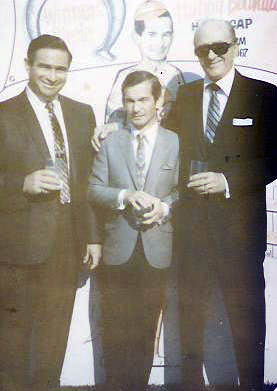
Agent Harry Silbert, Bill Shoemaker, and Marin, Chicago, 1967

For the next several years, Marin represented riding stars Don Brumfield and Manuel Ycaza, both future U.S. Racing Hall of Fame inductees, as well as "Milo" Valenzuela, winner of the 1958 Kentucky Derby and Preakness Stakes on Tim Tam, for Calumet Farm.

In 1960, Marin discovered Panamanian jockey Braulio Baeza while on vacation, secured a riding contract for him with Alabama sportsman Fred W. Hooper, and represented him for the next four years. During this time together they won the 1963 Kentucky Derby aboard Chateaugay, two Belmonts, two Jeromes and a host of other stakes . Baeza was elected to the U.S. Racing Hall of Fame in 1976.

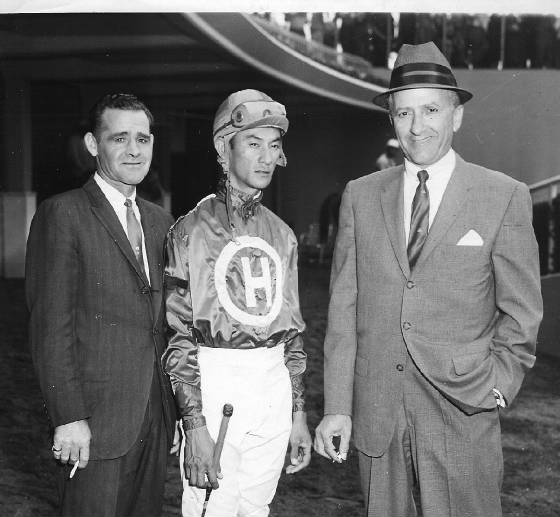
Trainer Chuck Parke, Braulio Baeza and Marin, at New York's Aqueduct Racetrack, 1961

In 1966, Marin introduced nineteen-year-old Laffit Pincay Jr. to the American Turf. Pincay was elected to the U.S. Racing Hall of Fame less than nine years later, and retired in 2003 as the world's winningest jockey.

Other well known riders that Marin worked for included Jorge Velásquez, Bobby Ussery, Ángel Cordero Jr. and Steve Cauthen, all U.S. Racing Hall of Fame inductees, as well as Eddie Belmonte, Álvaro Pineda, Joe Culmone, Ruperto Donoso, Glen Brogan and Heliodoro Gustines.

In 1973, Marin told the Orange County Register "So far I have been fortunate. I have had almost every top rider in America, and I have won just about every major stake (race). I have no complaints."

Marin was inducted into the Oriental Park/Cuban Horse Racing Hall of Fame Exhibit at Calder Race Course in Miami, Florida, in October 1986. He died December 1, 1988, in Arcadia, California, only several hours after the death of his first jockey and lifelong friend, Fernando Fernández.
