= Charles Kurtsinger =

American jockey

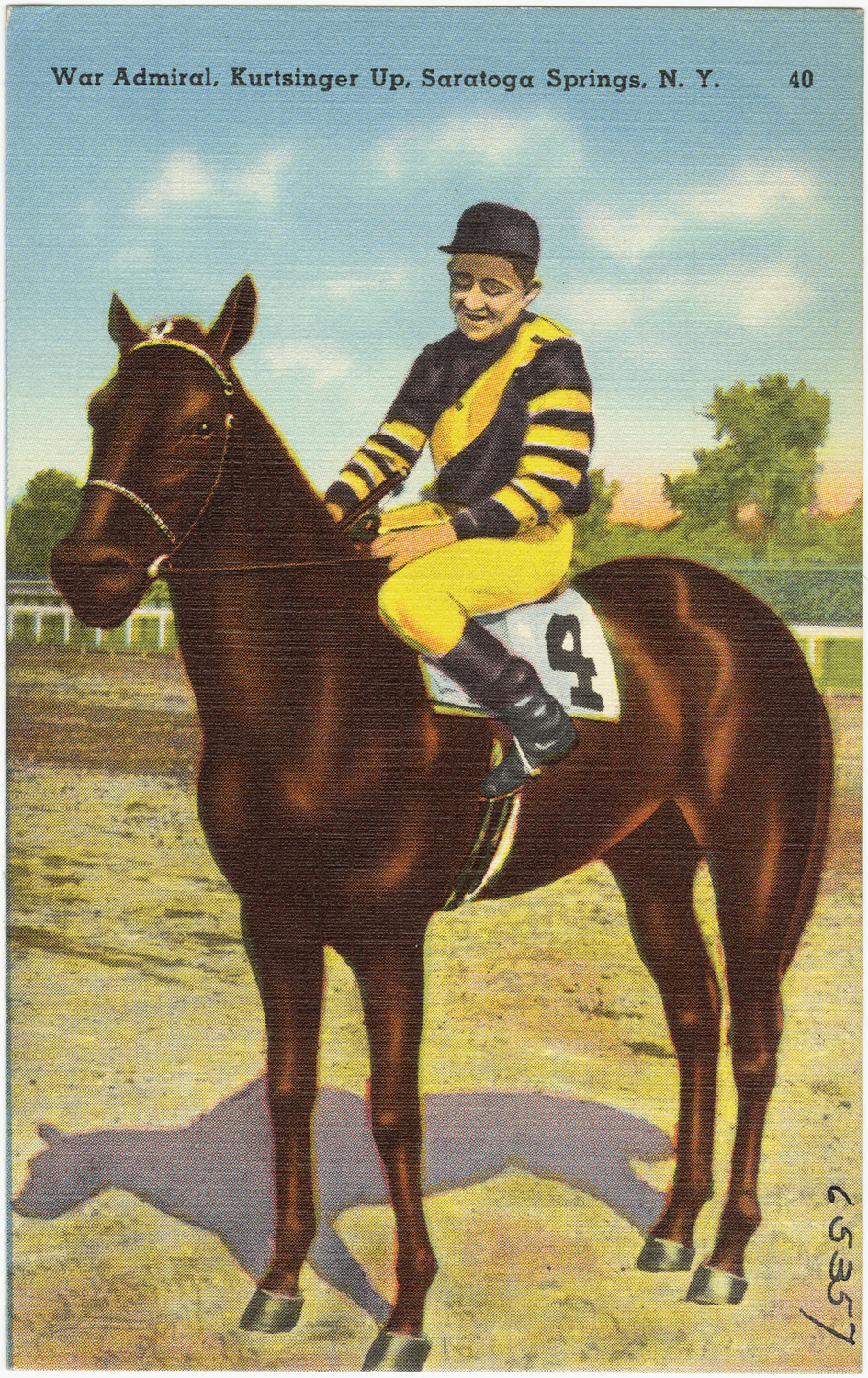

Personal information
- Born: November 16, 1906 Shepherdsville, Kentucky, U.S.
- Died: September 24, 1946 (aged 39) Louisville, Kentucky
- Resting place: Saint Michael Cemetery, Louisville, Kentucky
- Occupation: Jockey

Horse racing career
- Sport: Horse racing
- Career wins: 721

Major racing wins
- Oakdale Handicap (1929); Bay Shore Handicap (1930); Cowdin Stakes (1930); Huron Handicap (1930); Chesapeake Stakes (1931, 1937); Lawrence Realization Stakes (1931); Hawthorne Gold Cup Handicap (1931); Wood Memorial Stakes (1931); Jockey Club Gold Cup (1931, 1934); Ladies Handicap (1931, 1937); Philadelphia Handicap (1931); Saratoga Handicap (1931, 1938); Champagne Stakes (1932, 1937); Great American Stakes (1934); Saratoga Cup (1934); Clark Handicap (1936); Belmont Futurity (1937); Pimlico Special (1937); Remsen Stakes (1937); Wilson Stakes (1938); Withers Stakes (1938) U.S. Triple Crown series: Kentucky Derby (1931, 1937); Preakness Stakes (1933, 1937); Belmont Stakes (1931, 1937)

Racing awards
- U.S. Champion Jockey by earnings (1931, 1937)

Honors
- United States' Racing Hall of Fame (1967)

Significant horses
- Twenty Grand, Head Play, Sun Beau, War Admiral, Menow
- Updated on March 6, 2007

Charles Kurtsinger (November 16, 1906 – September 24, 1946) was an American Hall of Fame and National Champion jockey who won the Triple Crown in 1937.

Known as "Charley" and nicknamed "The Flying Dutchman", Kurtsinger was born in Shepherdsville, Kentucky and learned race riding from his jockey father and from veteran rider Mack Garner. Among his career achievements, he won the 1931 Kentucky Derby and Belmont Stakes aboard Twenty Grand and the Preakness Stakes in 1933 with Head Play. However, he is best known as the jockey of U.S. Triple Crown champion War Admiral. In 1931 and 1937, Kurtsinger was the leading U.S. jockey in earnings. Over his career, he won 12.8% of his starts.

Kurtsinger was the jockey on War Admiral in the famous 1938 match race with Seabiscuit. Laura Hillenbrand's bestselling book Seabiscuit: An American Legend recounts the story. In the movie version, Kurtsinger was played by retired Hall of Fame jockey Chris McCarron.

Dealing with an injury that was not healing properly, Kurtsinger retired in 1939. He turned to training but died of complications from pneumonia in 1946 at the age of 39 and was inducted into the United States' National Museum of Racing and Hall of Fame in 1967.
