= George Woolf =

Canadian-born race horse jockey (1910–1946)

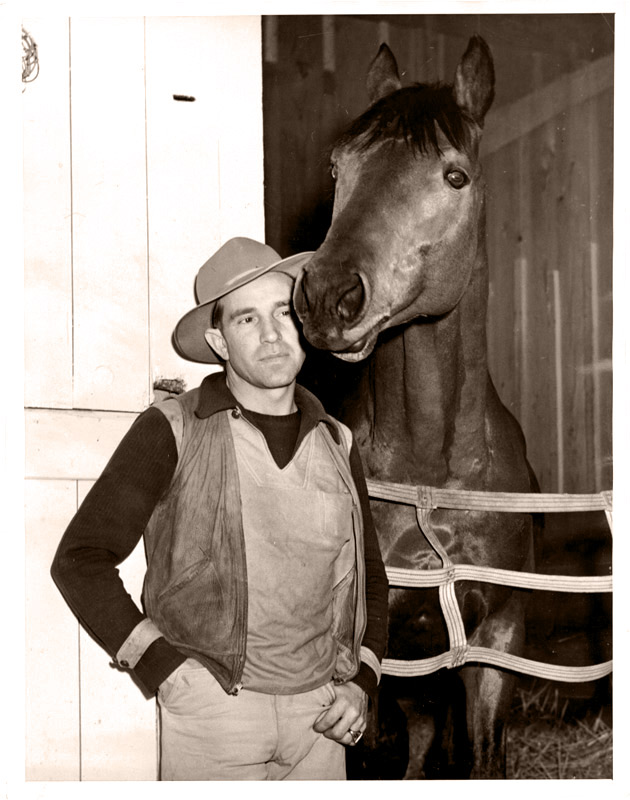
- George Woolf and Seabiscuit

Personal information
- Nickname: The Ice Man
- Born: May 31, 1910 Cardston, Alberta, Canada
- Died: January 4, 1946 (aged 35) Arcadia, California, U.S.
- Occupation: Jockey

Horse racing career
- Sport: Horse racing
- Career wins: 721

Major racing wins
- Arlington Handicap (1932); Hawthorne Gold Cup Handicap (1932); Latonia Championship (1932); Agua Caliente Handicap (1933); Santa Anita Handicap (1935); San Felipe Stakes (1937); Bay Meadows Handicap (1937, 1938); San Gabriel Handicap (1937, 1945); Potomac Handicap (1937); Havre de Grace Handicap (1938, 1939, 1940); Hollywood Gold Cup (1938, 1939, 1940); Pimlico Special (1938, 1940, 1942); Dwyer Stakes (1938); Los Angeles Handicap (1939); Chesapeake Stakes (1940, 1942); Correction Handicap (1940); Walden Stakes (1940); Whitney Handicap (1940); Carter Handicap (1940, 1943); Bay Shore Handicap (1941); Hollywood Derby (1941); Aqueduct Handicap (1942); Jockey Club Gold Cup (1942); Brooklyn Handicap (1942); Lawrence Realization Stakes (1942, 1944); Philadelphia Handicap (1942); Rowe Memorial Handicap (1942); Saratoga Special Stakes (1942, 1944); American Derby (1942, 1943, 1944); Belmont Futurity Stakes (1942, 1943, 1944); Narragansett Special (1942); Metropolitan Handicap (1943); Toboggan Handicap (1943); Coaching Club American Oaks (1943); Hopeful Stakes (1944); Stars and Stripes Handicap (1944); Beverly Handicap (1945); Black-Eyed Susan Stakes (1945); Santa Anita Derby (1945) American Classics wins: Preakness Stakes (1936)

Honours
- George Woolf Memorial Jockey Award; United States Racing Hall of Fame (1955); Canadian Horse Racing Hall of Fame (1976); Canada's Sports Hall of Fame (1956); Cardston Sports Hall of Fame; Alberta Sports Hall of Fame (2004); Life-sized bust at Santa Anita Park; Life-sized statue (with Seabiscuit) in Cardston, Alberta

Significant horses
- Seabiscuit, Kayak II, Bold Venture, Challedon; Alsab, Pavot, Whirlaway, Devil Diver

George Monroe Woolf (May 31, 1910 – January 4, 1946), nicknamed "The Iceman", was a Canadian thoroughbred race horse jockey. An annual jockey's award given by the United States Jockeys' Guild is named in his honor. He became known for riding the people's champion Seabiscuit to victories in 1938.

After his early death resulting from a racing accident, Woolf was inducted into newly founded honorary institutions: the National Museum of Racing and Hall of Fame, Canada's Sports Hall of Fame and the Canadian Horse Racing Hall of Fame.

== Early life and education ==
Woolf was born on a ranch in Cardston, Alberta to horse people - his mother had been a trick rider in a circus and his father rode in rodeos. Woolf learned to ride horses as a child and as a teenager he rode in horse races and competed in rodeo events in Alberta and Montana.

George's mother, Rosina Parker, was born in Wales, and his maternal grandmother was from England. His father, Frank Henry Woolf, was a Utah pioneer born before 1869 and an Alberta pioneer coming to Canada before 1890. His paternal grandfather Absalom Woolf and great-grandfather J.A. Woolf were Mormon pioneers, both settlers of Cache Valley, Utah. Absalom Woolf was a soldier in the Utah militia serving in the Walkara Indian War and also the Utah War.

Woolf's ancestor, Peter Woolf, was an early settler of New York, immigrating from Germany.

On the Newell and Olmstead side of his family, Woolf was related to the fur trapper and mountain man Robert "Doc" Newell, and related as well to Charles O. Card, the founder of the town of Cardston, Alberta.

Woolf's rodeo and horse training associates included the Bascom brothers - Raymond, Melvin, Earl and Weldon Bascom.

== Career ==
He began racing thoroughbreds professionally in 1928 in Vancouver, British Columbia. He also raced in Tijuana, Mexico before going to Arcadia, California, where he made his permanent home.

Using Santa Anita Park as his home base, Woolf became one of the premier jockeys of his era; he was known by fellow jockeys and fans as "The Iceman". He earned the nickname for displaying the patience in waiting for the right time to have his horse make a move in a race, as well as his calm attitude before major races, when he could take a nap while other jockeys nervously paced about.

While establishing himself as one of America's leading jockeys, he was diagnosed with what is now known as type 1 diabetes. Only a few years earlier, before the discovery of insulin, such a diagnosis would have been fatal. Because of his condition, and the nature of diabetes management in the 1930s and 1940s, Woolf had to regulate his weight to avoid rapid dieting. His racing success allowed him to accept only a few mounts each week, riding only 150–200 races each year compared to as many as a thousand rides other jockeys might undertake, and for years he maintained top physical condition. Despite his limited number of races and a relatively short career, Woolf won ninety-seven major stakes races around the United States, including the Hollywood Gold Cup Stakes, the American Derby and the Belmont Futurity Stakes three years running.

He made history in 1935 when he rode Azucar to victory in the first $100,000 horse race, the Santa Anita Handicap, defeating such greats as Equipoise and Twenty Grand. Woolf finished second twice at the Kentucky Derby and won the 1936 Preakness Stakes.

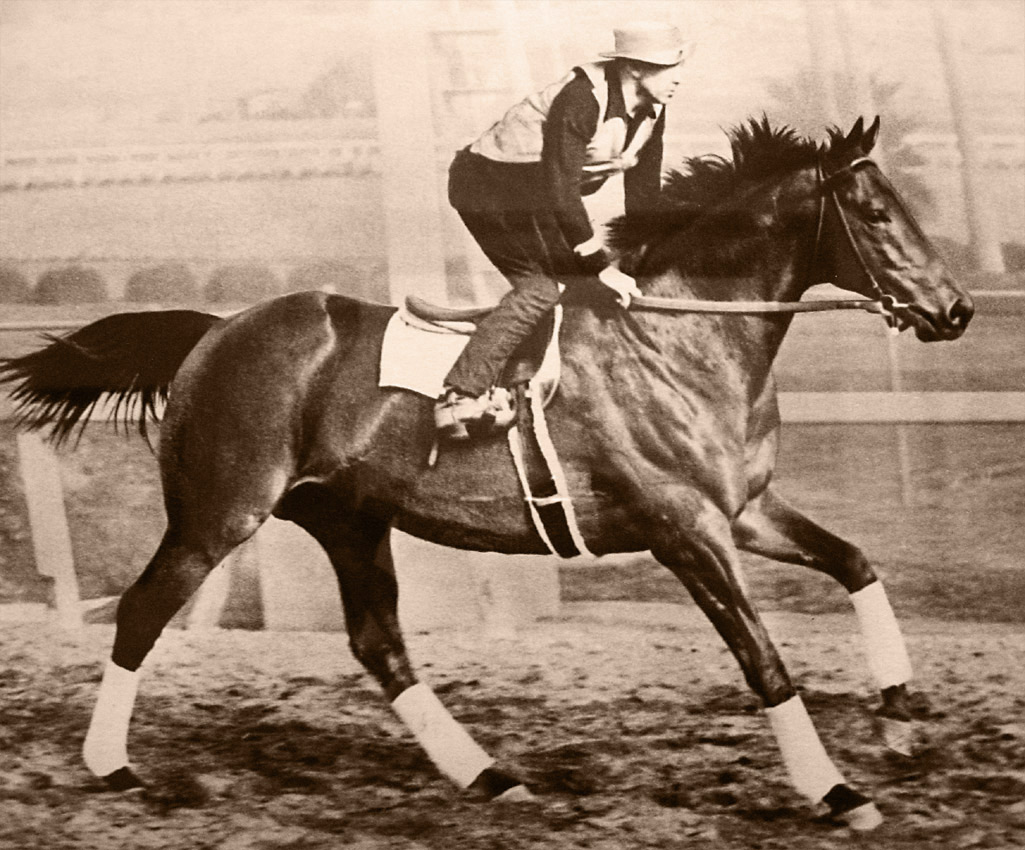
George Woolf on Seabiscuit

He is remembered for his tactical performance in the 1938 match race when he rode Seabiscuit to victory over the heavily favored U.S. Triple Crown champion, War Admiral, in the Pimlico Special at Baltimore, based on advice from his friend, Seabiscuit's injured regular jockey Red Pollard. When asked which was the best racehorse he had ever ridden, Woolf answered immediately, "Seabiscuit".

== Death ==
During the running of the fourth race at Santa Anita Park on January 3, 1946, Woolf fell from his horse, Please Me, as he rounded the clubhouse turn. Suffering from a concussion, he was taken to the hospital, where he died the following day. The jockeys in the race and the track stewards reported that they had not witnessed any incident during the race to have caused such a fall. Most observers think his diabetic condition may have resulted in his suffering a dizzy spell or fainting.

Western singing star Gene Autry sang at his funeral service.

== Legacy and honors ==
The death at age 35 of one of the country's best and most respected jockeys, and a favorite of fans, led to the creation of the George Woolf Memorial Jockey Award. During his career (1928–1946), Woolf had 3,784 mounts, 721 wins (19.1%), 589 seconds and 468 thirds, finishing in the money 46% of the time.

- In 1950, a life-size bronze statue of Woolf was erected in his honor near the walking ring at Santa Anita Park. It was funded by donations from fans starting in 1948. It was sculpted by Hughlette Wheeler.
- In 1955 Woolf was an inaugural inductee into the National Museum of Racing and Hall of Fame.
- In 1956 he was inducted into Canada's Sports Hall of Fame.
- In 1976, he was one of the inaugural class inducted into the Canadian Horse Racing Hall of Fame.
- On July 17, 2010, marking the 100th anniversary of Woolf's birth, a life-size equestrian statue was erected in his home town of Cardston, Alberta at its Remington Carriage Museum. The bronze work was donated by ranchers Jack and Ida Lowe, who had it made by the sculptor Don Toney. It depicts Woolf riding Seabiscuit to victory in the 1938 match race upset against War Admiral.

== Representation in other media ==
- Woolf is mentioned as one of the greatest jockeys of all times in the movie The Black Stallion (1979), directed by Carroll Ballard. The film was adapted from Walter Farley's 1941 children's novel of the same name.
- In the film, Seabiscuit (2003), Woolf was portrayed by the jockey Gary Stevens, who has also been inducted into the National Museum of Racing and Hall of Fame. Stevens had won the George Woolf Memorial Jockey Award in 1996.

== See also ==
- List of Canadian sports personalities
