= Sheilas Reward =

American-bred Thoroughbred racehorse

- Sire: Reaping Reward
- Grandsire: Sickle
- Dam: Smart Sheila
- Damsire: Jamestown
- Sex: Stallion
- Foaled: 1947
- Country: United States
- Color: Bay
- Breeder: Mrs. Louis Lazare
- Owner: Mrs. Louis Lazare
- Trainer: Eugene Jacobs
- Record: 33: 13-12-3
- Earnings: US$119,020

Major wins
- Select Handicap (1950); Fleetwing Handicap (1950); Interborough Handicap (1950); Bay Shore Handicap (1951); Queens County Handicap (1951); Long Branch Handicap (1951)

Awards
- American Champion Sprint Horse (1950, 1951)

Sheilas Reward (foaled 1947 in Kentucky) was an American Thoroughbred Champion racehorse who was voted the American Champion Sprint Horse of 1950 and 1951. He was sired by multiple stakes winner Reaping Reward and out of the mare Smart Sheila, a daughter of 1930 American Champion Two-Year-Old Colt Jamestown.

== Three-year-old season ==
Sheilas Reward was bred and raced by Mrs. Louis Lazare, who owned his dam, Smart Sheila. Louis Lazare was president and major shareholder of Duplex Fabrics Corporation, a distributor of finished rayon fabrics to the dress trade. Lazare, a past President of the Textile Converters Association of America, Inc., sold his company to Burlington Mills Corporation of New York in 1947 and was appointed a vice-president and Director. Sheilas Reward was trained by Eugene Jacobs who guided the three-year-old to wins in the 1950 Select and Interborough Handicaps plus the July 5, 1950 Fleetwing Handicap at Jamaica Race Course in which Sheilas Reward broke the track record by a sizeable 3/5 of a second with a time of 109 2/5 for six furlongs. His performances earned him his first American Champion Sprint Horse honors.

== Four-year-old season ==
Wins at age four in the 1951 Bay Shore, Queens County, and Long Branch Handicaps brought Sheilas Reward his second straight American Champion Sprint Horse title.

== Pedigree ==
Pedigree of Sheilas Reward
Sire Reaping Reward	Sickle	Phalaris	Polymelus
Sire Reaping Reward	Sickle	Phalaris	Bromus
Sire Reaping Reward	Sickle	Selene	Chaucer
Sire Reaping Reward	Sickle	Selene	Serenissima
Sire Reaping Reward	Dustwhirl	Sweep	Ben Brush
Sire Reaping Reward	Dustwhirl	Sweep	Pink Domino
Sire Reaping Reward	Dustwhirl	Ormonda	Superman
Sire Reaping Reward	Dustwhirl	Ormonda	Princess Ormonde
Dam Smart Sheila	Jamestown	St. James	Ambassador
Dam Smart Sheila	Jamestown	St. James	Bobolink
Dam Smart Sheila	Jamestown	Mlle. Dazie	Fair Play
Dam Smart Sheila	Jamestown	Mlle. Dazie	Toggery
Dam Smart Sheila	Ship Ablaze	Man o' War	Fair Play
Dam Smart Sheila	Ship Ablaze	Man o' War	Mahubah
Dam Smart Sheila	Ship Ablaze	Golden Haze	Golden Broom
Dam Smart Sheila	Ship Ablaze	Golden Haze	Smoky Lamp
