= Select Stakes (United States) =

Annual thoroughbred horse race held in the United States

- Class: Ungraded stakes
- Location: Monmouth Park Racetrack; Oceanport, New Jersey; United States
- Inaugurated: 1883
- Race type: Thoroughbred - Flat racing
- Website: monmouthpark.com

Race information
- Distance: 5 1/2 furlongs
- Surface: Dirt
- Track: Left-handed
- Qualification: Three-years-old
- Purse: $60,000 (2015)

The Select Stakes is an American Thoroughbred horse race run annually at Monmouth Park Racetrack in Oceanport, New Jersey. First run in 1883, the race is open to three-year-olds and is run over a distance of six furlongs on dirt.

Among the notable winners of the Select are Champions Sheilas Reward in 1950, Decathlon in 1956, Nadir in 1958. Shecky Greene in 1973, Gallant Bob in 1975 plus in 1979, the Florida-bred Canadian Horse Racing Hall of Fame inductee, Bold Ruckus.

== Winners ==
Year	Winner	Jockey	Trainer	Owner	Distance	Time
2024	Smithwick's Spice	Jorge Luis Gonzalez	Douglas Nunn	New Spice Stable	5 1/2 F	1:04.18
2023	Eamonn	Paco Lopez	Joseph F. Orseno	Robert Cotran	5 1/2 F	1:02.96
2022	Belgrano	Jorge Vargas, Jr.	Frank Russo	Peace Sign Stables	5 1/2 F	1:02.12
2021	No race					
2020	No race					
2019	No race					
2018	No race					
2017	No race					
2016	Full Salute	Paco Lopez	Edward Plesa Jr.	Morris Bailey	5 1/2 F	1:03.02
2015	Fast Flying Rumor	Samuel Camacho Jr.	Gerald S. Bennett	Winning Stables/Midnight Rider	5 1/2 F	1:02.26
2014	No race?					
2013	No race?					
2012	No race?					
2011	Chipshot	Corey Nakatani	Steve Asmussen	Vinery Stables, LLC	6 F	1:08.72
2010	Out of Respect	Paco Lopez	Scott J. Volk	JMJ Racing Stables	6 F	1:10.00
2009	Prince Joshua	Paco Lopez	Barry Rose	Rose Family Stables	6 F	1:09.68
2008	M J's Enchanteur	Eddie Castro	Scott A. Lake	Ben Mondello & Adam Russo	6 F	1:09.26.
2007	Cobalt Blue	Garrett Gomez	Douglas F. O'Neill	The Merv Griffin Ranch Co.	6 F	1:10.54
2006	Yes He's The Man	Eddie Castro	J. David Braddy	J. David Braddy & Joel Sainer	6 F	1:04.85
2005	More Smoke	Clinton Potts	John C. Zimmerman	Thomas McClay & Harry Nye	6 F	1:10.04
