= Bay Meadows Handicap =

American horse race

Bay Meadows Breeders' Cup Handicap was an American Thoroughbred horse race held annually since 1934 at Bay Meadows Racetrack in San Mateo, California. Held in late September, the Bay Meadows Breeders' Cup Handicap is currently an ungraded stakes event for 3-year-olds and up, raced on turf at a distance of 1 1/8-miles with a purse of $150,000.

Inaugurated in 1934 as the Bay Meadows Handicap, on November 28, 2007 this Grade III stakes race was downgraded to ungraded status by the American Graded Stakes Committee.

== Partial list of past winners ==
- 2008 : Bold Chieftain
- 2007 : Now Victory
- 2006 : Flamethrowintexan
- 2005 : Adreamisborn
- 2004 : Needwood Blade
- 2003 : Mister Acpen
- 2002 : David Copperfield
- 2001 : Super Quercus
- 2000 : Devine Wind
- 1999 : Kirkwall
- 1998 : Hawksley Hill
- 1997 : El Angelo
- 1996 : Gentlemen (ARG)
- 1995 : Caesour
- 1994 : Blues Traveller
- 1993 : Slew of Damascus
- 1992 : Forty Niner Days
- 1991 : French Seventyfive
- 1990 : Robinski
- 1989 : Ten Keys
- 1988 : Wait Till Monday
- 1987 : Show Dancer
- 1986 : Palace Music
- 1985 : Drumalis
- 1984 : Scruples
- 1983 : Interco
- 1982 : Super Moment
- 1981 : Super Moment
- 1980 : Super Moment
- 1979 : Leonotis
- 1978 : Bywayofchicago
- 1977 : Painted wagon
- 1976 : Lifes Hope
- 1975 : Bahia Key
- 1974 : Indefatigable
- 1973 : Partners Hope
- 1972 : Timoteo
- 1971 : Silver Double
- 1970 : Traffic Beat
- 1969 : Field Master
- 1968 : Praise Jay
- 1967 : No Host
- 1966 : Diamond Lou
- 1965 : Maker's Mark
- 1964 : Biggs
- 1963 : Mustard Plaster
- 1962 : Sea Orbit
- 1961 : Mr. Wag
- 1960 : Prize Host
- 1959 : Promised Land
- 1958 : Battle Dance
- 1957 : Count Chic
- 1956 : Holandes
- 1955 : Arrogate
- 1954 : Decorated
- 1953 : Stranglehold
- 1952 : Moonrush
- 1951 : Moonrush
- 1950 : Frankly
- 1949 : Moonrush
- 1948 : Mafosta
- 1947 : Artillery
- 1946 : Adrogue (Run twice in 1946)
- 1946 : Occupy (Run twice in 1946)
- 1945 : No Wrinkles
- 1944 : Okana
- 1943 : Put In
- 1942 : Stinging Bee
- 1941 : No Competition
- 1940 : Sweepida
- 1938 : Seabiscuit
- 1937 : Seabiscuit
- 1936 : Special Agent
- 1935 : Head Play
- 1934 : Time Supply
