= James Stout =

- Jimmy Stout and wife, Aileen "Billie" Stout, c. 1939

Personal information
- Born: May 6, 1914 Lakewood, New Jersey, United States
- Died: July 12, 1976 (aged 62) Harrisburg, Pennsylvania, United States
- Resting place: Junior Mechanics Cemetery; Tabernacle, New Jersey
- Occupation: Jockey

Horse racing career
- Sport: Horse racing
- Career wins: 2,056

Major racing wins
- Champlain Handicap (1936); Jockey Club Gold Cup (1936, 1940); Travers Stakes (1936, 1940); Lawrence Realization Stakes (1936, 1940); Saratoga Cup (1936, 1939, 1940); Juvenile Stakes (1937); Tremont Stakes (1937); Spinaway Stakes (1937); Gazelle Handicap (1937, 1938, 1942); Lane's End Breeders' Futurity (1938); Remsen Stakes (1938); Stuyvesant Handicap (1938); Wood Memorial Stakes (1938, 1939); Carter Handicap (1939, 1944, 1945, 1954); Fleetwing Handicap (1939, 1943, 1944); Jamaica Handicap (1939, 1946); Withers Stakes (1939); Cowdin Stakes (1940); Brooklyn Handicap (1940, 1941); Butler Handicap (1941); Whitney Handicap (1941); Yonkers Handicap (1941, 1942, 1943); Beldame Stakes (1942); Wilson Stakes (1942); Edgemere Handicap (1943); Bay Shore Handicap (1945); Toboggan Handicap (1945); Frizette Stakes (1945); Narragansett Special (1952); Sport Page Handicap (1953); Oceanport Handicap (1953) American Classic Race wins: Kentucky Derby (1939); Belmont Stakes (1936, 1938, 1939)

Honors
- United States' Racing Hall of Fame (1968)

Significant horses
- Seabiscuit, Granville, Johnstown, Fenelon; Assault, Fighting Fox, Stymie, Omaha

James Stout (May 6, 1914 - July 12, 1976) was an American Hall of Fame thoroughbred horse racing jockey who won four Triple Crown races.

Known as "Jimmy," he began working at a racetrack as a stable boy then in 1930 became a professional jockey. Stout became most famous riding for Belair Stud and trainer Sunny Jim Fitzsimmons. He rode Seabiscuit in his first race in January 1935 before the colt was sold. In 1936 Stout rode in his first Kentucky Derby. His highly touted colt Granville was a victim of one of the roughest starts in Derby history, and he was thrown from the horse. However, Jimmy Stout and Granville came back to finish second to the Derby winner Bold Venture in the Preakness Stakes then won the Belmont Stakes and went on to earn the Eclipse Award for Horse of the Year. Jimmy Stout won the Belmont two more times, aboard Pasteurized in 1938 and the following year he rode future Hall of Famer Johnstown to victory in both the 1939 Kentucky Derby and the 1939 Belmont Stakes. Among his other major racing successes, he won the Jockey Club Gold Cup on two occasions.

Jimmy Stout became part of racing history when he rode Bousset to a share of the victory in racing's only triple dead heat in the June 10, 1944 Carter Handicap. In 1946 he returned to his native New Jersey to ride at Monmouth Park Racetrack in Oceanport where he was the leading rider for four years. After a twenty-five-year career as a jockey, in which he won 2,056 races, Stout retired from riding in 1954 following which he worked as a race official.

In 1968 Jimmy Stout was inducted into the National Museum of Racing and Hall of Fame.

Jimmy Stout died on July 12, 1976, of a heart attack in Harrisburg, Pennsylvania, where he had been working as a racetrack steward.
