= Silas B. Mason =

American construction executive

Silas B. Mason II
- Born: October 22, 1879; Orange County, Virginia, U.S.
- Died: April 14, 1936 (aged 56); Grand Coulee, Washington, U.S.
- Resting place: Frankfort Cemetery
- Education: Princeton University
- Occupation(s): Construction businessman, racehorse owner & breeder
- Board member of: Mason & Hanger, Keeneland Association
- Spouse: Suzanne Dallam Burnett

Silas Boxley Mason II (October 22, 1879 – April 14, 1936) was an American construction executive and racehorse owner, born in Orange County, Virginia. He was part of a Mason family that had been involved with the construction business since 1827. A graduate of Washington and Lee University and Princeton University, he went on to make the Mason & Hanger company one of the largest construction contractors in the United States.

His first high-profile venture came in 1927 when he was awarded the contract for the George Washington Bridge foundation on the New Jersey side. During the 1930s Mason would cement his reputation as a master builder when in 1933 he headed the M. W. A. K. consortium (Mason-Walsh-Atkinson, Kier) that built the Grand Coulee Dam in Mason City, Washington. His company would then become involved in the construction of the Lincoln Tunnel.

== Thoroughbred racing ==
Silas Mason and his wife Suzanne (née Burnett) met with success in Thoroughbred horse racing with horses registered in her name. A native Kentuckian, she was a descendant of Colonel Richard Henderson, who, along with General George Rogers Clark, Daniel Boone, and others, were Kentucky pioneers who formed the Transylvania Land Company. The couple purchased a home and breeding farm near Lexington, Kentucky called Duntreath.

During his tenure, Silas Mason's partner in the construction business was Arnold Hanger. They also teamed up to race horses together under the nom de course Warm Stable. In April 1929, the Warm Stable partnership purchased Preakness Stakes winner Victorian from Harry Payne Whitney as part of a three-horse deal. A four-year-old at the time, Victorian raced and won into 1930, but the stallion had been acquired primarily for breeding purposes and stood at stud at the Masons’ Duntreath Farm near Lexington, Kentucky. Victorian died in 1934 having sired less than three full crops. However, five years later the colt Head Play made his owners famous with a second-place finish in the Kentucky Derby and a win in the Preakness Stakes. The Masons also owned He Did, winner of the 1936 Santa Anita Derby.

== Mason & Hanger ==
Silas Boxley Mason II took over the leadership of Mason & Hanger with the death of Harry Hanger in 1925. Silas was the grandson of the company founder, Claiborne Rice Mason, and the son of its second president, Horatio Pleasants Mason. Silas Boxley Mason II's uncle, a younger brother of Horatio, was also named Silas Boxley Mason.

Claiborne Mason had been born in Chesterfield County, Virginia in 1800 and founded the Mason Syndicate in 1827, when contracted to work on a section of what became the Chesapeake and Ohio Railway. In 1870, the company's name was changed to Mason & Hoge. Railroad work was its main construction business, including bridges and tunnels. Notable projects included the Rays Hill Tunnel and the Dingess Tunnel.

Horatio took over the presidency after the death of Claiborne in 1885. Besides specializing in tunneling, notable construction projects included portions of the Chicago Drainage Canal. Harry Hanger took over the presidency after the death of Horatio in 1906. Notable construction projects included the Moodna Siphon Tunnel part of the Catskill Aqueduct, the Nelson Tunnel in Colorado, and portions of the Brooklyn subway. Key WWI contracts included the construction of Camp Zachary Taylor, the Port Newark Terminal, the Port Charleston Terminal, Gerstner Field, and the Old Hickory Powder Plant.

In 1927, the company was awarded the contract for the compressed air tunneling of the twin Fulton Street tunnels. Parallel projects operated on both the Manhattan and the Brooklyn side of the East River. Construction was completed by the spring of 1931. Soon after, the company was awarded the Rutgers Street Tunnel project, which was completed in 1932. Then in 1937, the company started work on the first tube of the Lincoln Tunnel, completing it that year. The third tube was completed in 1957. In 1941, the company started work on the twin tubes for the Brooklyn-Battery tunnel, which was completed in 1947.

In 1940, Mason & Hanger started work on the Radford Ordnance Works, which was operational by March 1941, and then the New River Ordnance plant, which was completed by January 1942. Additionally, the company completed its work on the Badger Ordnance Works in 1944.

In 1947 the United States Atomic Energy Commission (AEC) approached the company regarding atomic bomb production. Mason & Hanger was awarded a contract to rehabilitate, construct new facilities, and eventually operate the Iowa Ordnance Plant. In 1949, the plant started producing explosive components for atomic weapons and in 1950 began assembling atomic bombs, except for the nuclear component.

In 1951, the company was awarded a contract for the rehabilitation, and construction, of a second AEC facility at Pantex, which opened in 1953. The Iowa plant started handling fissionable material in 1956, when it assembled the AIR-2 Genie, in addition to other missiles and artillery shells. The company started operating Pantex in October 1956, and opened a development lab in 1960. From 1958 until 1966, the company operated AEC Modification Centers at Medina Base, near San Antonio, and Clarksville Base, near Clarksville, Tennessee. Pantex assumed stockpile surveillance in 1985, and the Iowa facility was merged into Pantex by 1975. At that time, Pantex became the sole final assembly plant for finished nuclear weapons.

== Silas Mason Company ==
A subsidiary to Mason & Hanger, the Silas Mason Company was incorporated in 1926 to construct sections of New York's third subway system. The company was then awarded construction of the George Washington Bridge's tower pier on the New Jersey side of the Hudson River. The underwater foundation was built using one of the deepest cofferdam operations ever attempted. The piers were complete by April 1928.

Silas Mason became chairman of the board of Mason & Hanger and the Silas Mason Company in 1929. Arthur Sackett became president of Mason & Hanger, while Sam A. Mason II became president of the Silas Mason Company. The Silas Mason Company started construction of the Sumner Tunnel in March 1931, which was completed in December 1932, setting a record for tunneling in soft earth. In 1942, after eight years, Coulee Dam construction was completed by a partnership consisting of Mason, Walsh, Atkinson & Kier (MWAK).

The Silas Mason Company built and operated the Louisiana Ordnance Plant during World War II. In 1949, they drilled the twelve tunnels needed for the Fort Randall Dam, eight for the penstocks, and four for Missouri River flood control. Then between 1954 and 1957, the company built the Harvey Tunnel in a joint venture with R.P. Farnsworth & Co. In 1955, the company merged with Mason & Hanger to become Mason & Hanger-Silas Mason Company, Inc.

== Legacy ==
Silas Mason suffered a heart attack on 14 April 1936 and died at the Mason City hospital 15 hours later. He was interred in the Frankfort Cemetery in Frankfort, Kentucky the following Sunday. The Lexington Herald wrote, "Throughout the last three decades, Silas B. Mason had been a leader in the building of railroads, aqueducts, docks, dams, tunnels, subways, skyscrapers, highways-in fact, nearly every branch of construction work in which leadership and the genius of a man like Silas Mason could serve nation, state, or private industry."

== See also ==
- Masonite
- Day & Zimmermann
