= Mack Garner =

American jockey (1898–1936)

Personal information
- Born: December 23, 1898 Centerville, Iowa, US
- Died: October 28, 1936 (aged 37) Covington, Kentucky, US
- Resting place: Linden Grove Cemetery, Covington, Kentucky
- Occupation: Jockey

Horse racing career
- Sport: Horse racing
- Career wins: 1,346

Major racing wins
- Travers Stakes (1915); Spinaway Stakes (1915, 1921); Suburban Handicap (1916); Ben Ali Handicap (1920, 1922); Sanford Stakes (1921, 1934); Huron Handicap (1922, 1929); Mount Vernon Handicap (1922); Latonia Championship Stakes; (1923, 1924, 1925); Dixie Stakes (1924); Derby Trial Stakes (1925, 1926); Clark Handicap (1926); Paumonok Handicap (1928); American Legion Handicap (1929, 1930); Arlington Classic (1929, 1934); Fleetwing Handicap (1929); Jamaica Handicap (1929); Lawrence Realization Stakes (1929); United States Hotel Stakes (1929); Withers Stakes (1929); Wood Memorial Stakes (1929); Empire City Derby (1930); Jerome Stakes (1930, 1933); Astoria Stakes (1931); Bay Shore Handicap (1931); Champlain Handicap (1931); Delaware Handicap (1931); Edgemere Handicap (1931); Manhattan Handicap (1931); Test Stakes (1931, 1932); Hopeful Stakes (1934); American Derby (1934); Chesapeake Stakes (1934); Toboggan Handicap (1934) U.S. Triple Crown series: Kentucky Derby (1934) Belmont Stakes (1929, 1933)

Racing awards
- United States Champion Jockey by wins (1915); United States Champion Jockey by earnings (1915, 1929)

Honors
- National Museum of Racing and Hall of Fame (1969); Fair Grounds Racing Hall of Fame (1971)

Significant horses
- Calvacade; Blue Larkspur; Friar Rock
- Updated on October 30, 2021

Andrew Mack Garner (December 23, 1898 – October 28, 1936) was an American jockey who won the 1934 Kentucky Derby as well as the 1929 and 1933 Belmont Stakes. He was inducted in the National Museum of Racing and Hall of Fame in 1969. Mack Garner made his professional racing debut on July 16, 1914, at a Butte, Montana racetrack.

== Personal life ==
Always known by Mack, Garner was born in Centerville, Iowa on December 23, 1898, to Theodore Garner and Sarah Clements Garner. He learned how to ride horses from his father. When he was 15 years old, Garner wanted to ride race horses because the Garners were all jockeys at one time, including his father and uncle. Once Garner learned the basics of horse riding, he and his father began working for William Cain. Garner was married in 1920 to Willis M. Leslie and they had four girls and one boy. His brothers Guy, Harry and Wayne were all jockeys as was their sister's son William Garner Rinehart who rode under the name Willie Garner.

== Career ==
Garner was 5 feet three inches tall and 67 pounds when he started his professional career. He debuted professionally on July 16, 1914, at a Butte, Montana racetrack on the horse Gold Ball. His first winning race was with the horse Sam Connor on August 15, 1914. Garner said of his winning race, "Was I tickled? Well, I'll say I was. Imagine a kid my size and weight riding a winner at one mile and sixteenth!" In 1915, he won more races and more prize money than any jockey in the United States. In 1929, he again led all jockeys in earnings with $314,975.

Garner went from riding for Cain to riding for J. L. Holland. He then rode for Price and Corrigan who paid $25,000 for his contract. The next people he rode for were R. L. Baker, J. C. Milan, Pete Coyne, and then Moe Lowenstein. In 1921, he won the Latonia Derby on the horse Brother Bach. He gained more attention when he beat the famous horse Morvich in a race while using a then unknown horse named Surf Rider in August 1922 in Saratoga Springs, New York.

A 1923 article from The Des Moines Register stated that Garner "has ridden for every important horse racer in the country". The same article proclaimed Garner and his rival Earl Sande as the world's greatest horse racers. In November 1923, Garner and Sande raced each other at the Latonia Derby with Garner riding In Memoriam and Sande riding Zev. Despite injuring his chest and breaking his shoulder shortly before the race began, he won the race against Sande. The two of them used the same horses two weeks later at Churchill Downs in Louisville, Kentucky to race again. Garner and In Memorium were originally stated to be the winners, but it was later decided that it was a tie. In 1929, Garner won the American Classic at Arlington Park in Illinois. Garner entered the Kentucky Derby in 1929 on the horse Blue Larkspur and won fourth place. Later, Garner and Blue Larkspur won the Belmont Stakes and Blue Larkspur was named horse of the year. He won the Belmont Stakes again in 1933. He won the 1934 Kentucky Derby while riding the horse Cavalcade. Garner stated that his Kentucky Derby win with Cavalcade was the happiest day of his life.

When asked what he considered the best horse that he has ever ridden by The Brooklyn Daily Eagle in 1929, Garner said, "I have ridden a number of fast horses - Polydor, Miss Joy, Iron Mask, Pan Zaretta, Rockminster and others. But Blue Larkspur, I'm certain, is the best horse I ever rode over a distance of ground." During his lifetime, Garner rode in 8,128 races and won 1,346 of them.

== Death ==
Garner had two heart attacks on October 28, 1936, and then had his third one on the same day at St. Elizabeth Hospital in Covington, Kentucky after competing earlier in the day at River Downs racetrack near Cincinnati, Ohio. The third blood clot of the heart killed Garner at 37 years old. Garner was buried at Linden Grove Cemetery in Covington, Kentucky.

In 1954, Garner was put in the Des Moines Register Sports Hall of Fame. In 1969, he was posthumously inducted into the National Museum of Racing and Hall of Fame. On September 9, 1995, Garner's great-granddaughter Karen O' Brien said in a speech to the Northern Kentucky University literature class that she was in, "I know most of you have heard of, and some of you might have attended at least one Derby. Although I doubt that any of you have ever heard of Mack Garner, I am proud to tell you that he was my great-grandfather."
