= Ruperto Donoso =

Chilean jockey (1914–2001)

Personal information
- Born: November 10, 1914 Santiago, Chile
- Died: August 16, 2001 (aged 86)
- Occupation: Jockey

Horse racing career
- Sport: Horse racing
- Career wins: Not found

Major racing wins
- Newport Purse (1938); Chesapeake Stakes (1939); New Castle Handicap (1939); Brandywine Handicap (1940); Huron Handicap (1940); McLennan Memorial Handicap (1940); Spinaway Stakes (1940); Schuylerville Stakes (1940); Widener Challenge Cup Handicap (1940); Arlington-Washington Lassie Stakes (1941); Matron Stakes (1941); Cowdin Stakes (1946); Daingerfield Handicap (1946); Havre de Grace Handicap (1946); Remsen Stakes (1946); American Legion Handicap (1947); Empire City Handicap (1947); Whitney Handicap (1947); Demoiselle Stakes (1947); Dwyer Stakes (1947); Jockey Club Gold Cup (1947); Long Branch Handicap (1948); Massachusetts Handicap (1948); Merchants and Citizens Handicap (1948) American Classic Race wins: Belmont Stakes (1947)

Significant horses
- Phalanx, Take Wing

Ruperto Donoso (November 10, 1914 - August 16, 2001) was a Chilean jockey in the sport of Thoroughbred horse racing. He is best known for guiding Phalanx to victory in the 1947 Belmont Stakes. He also rode Gilded Knight to a second-place finish in the 1939 Preakness Stakes.

Born in Santiago, Chile, Donoso began his career riding in Santiago and at the Hipódromo de Monterrico in Lima, Peru. He later moved to the United States and rode under contract for Alfred G. Vanderbilt's racing stable.

Ruperto Donoso was required to do mandatory service with the Chilean Army and as such did not race in 1942 and 1943, returning on July 24, 1944, to compete at New York's Belmont Park. In the 1947 U.S. Triple Crown series, superstar jockey Eddie Arcaro rode Phalanx to a second-place finish in the Kentucky Derby and to a third in the Preakness Stakes. It was then that trainer Syl Veitch decided to replace Arcaro with the C. V. Whitney stable's secondary jockey in the Belmont Stakes. Donoso had ridden Phalanx to two wins in 1946 but as the stable's first string jockey, Arcaro had had first choice on all mounts.

Among his other success, Donoso guided Many Stings to a half-length victory over Big Pebble and fourteen other runners in the Widener Challenge Cup at Hialeah Park. The win brought Leo J. Mark's Le Mar Stock Farm the $52,000 winner's share of the purse.
