= Travers Stakes =

American Grade I Thoroughbred horse race

- 139th Travers Stakes logo (2008)
- Class: Grade 1
- Location: Saratoga Race Course; Saratoga Springs, New York, United States
- Inaugurated: 1864
- Race type: Thoroughbred
- Website: NYRA / Travers

Race information
- Distance: 1 1/4 miles (10 Furlongs)
- Surface: Dirt
- Track: Left-handed
- Qualification: 3-year-olds
- Weight: Colt/Gelding: 126 lb (57 kg); Filly: 121 lb (55 kg)
- Purse: US$1,250,000

The Travers Stakes is an American Grade I Thoroughbred horse race held at Saratoga Race Course in Saratoga Springs, New York. It is nicknamed the "Midsummer Derby" and is the third-ranked race for American three-year-olds according to international classifications, behind only the Kentucky Derby and Belmont Stakes. First held in 1864, it is the oldest stakes race in the United States specifically for 3-year-olds, and was named for William R. Travers, the president of the old Saratoga Racing Association. His horse, Kentucky, won the first running of the Travers. The race was not run in 1896, 1898, 1899, 1900, 1911, and 1912. From 1943 to 1945, it was run at Belmont Park instead of Saratoga due to World War II.

The race is the highlight of the summer race meeting at Saratoga, just as the Belmont Stakes is the highlight of the spring meeting at Belmont Park. The purse was increased to $1,000,000 in 1999 and then to $1,250,000 in 2014. The purse for the 2015 renewal was increased to $1,600,000 due to the presence of Triple Crown winner American Pharoah.

From 2018 until 2022 the Travers Stakes was sponsored by Jim McIngvale under the name of retired stallion Runhappy.

The 157th Travers Stakes was run on Saturday, August 29, 2026.

== Overview ==
The Travers is run at scale weights: colts and geldings carry 126 pounds (57 kg) and fillies carry 121 pounds (55 kg).

The Travers has been run at four different distances:

- 1 3/4 miles (2.8 km): 1864 to 1889
- 1 1/2 miles (2.4 km): 1890 to 1892
- 1 1/4 miles (2.0 km): 1893, 1894, 1897 and 1904 to present
- 1 1/8 miles (1.8 km): 1895 and 1901 to 1903

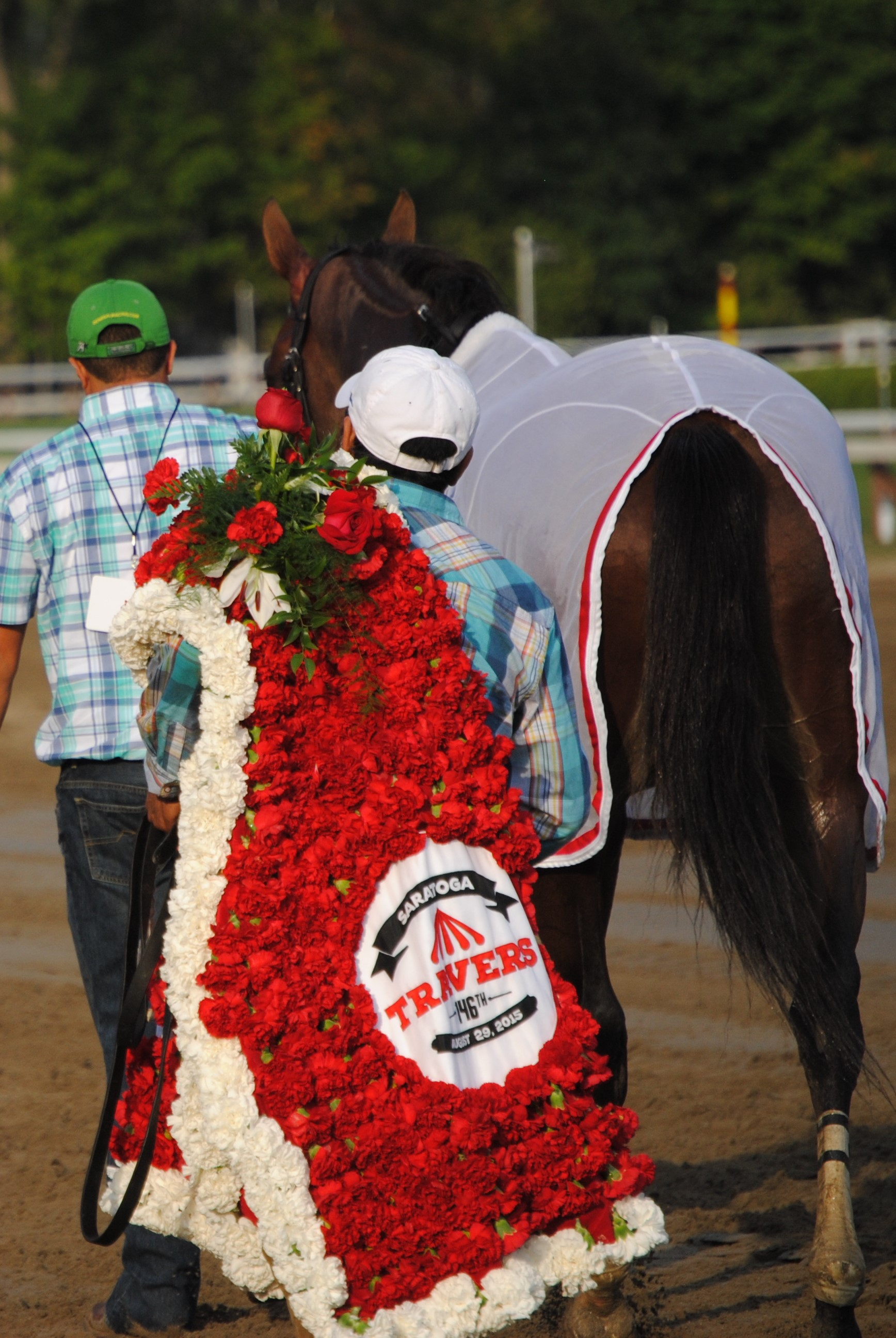
A blanket of flowers is presented to the winner

== Awards for winner ==
The winner's trophy, known as the Man o' War Cup, was designed by Tiffany & Co. Its namesake, Man o' War, won this race in 1920. The trophy was won by Man o' War in a special match race in 1920 against Sir Barton, the 1919 American Triple Crown winner. The wife of owner Samuel Riddle donated the trophy in 1936 as the permanent award for winning the race. Each year, the name of the winner is inscribed on the Cup. A gold-plated replica is presented to the winner each year by a member of the Riddle family.

The winner of the race is presented with a blanket of carnations, which is approximately 10 feet long and requires about 1,500 flowers and is draped over the withers of the winner. The blanket is red in color outlined with a fringe of white carnation and a large "T" also in white. The carnations are red and white, which are the colors of Saratoga Race Track. The blanket is prepared the night before the race by a Saratoga florist.

Winning connections are also given a lawn jockey statue custom-painted in the silk colors of the winning owner to be displayed at the racecourse entrance for the next year.

Since 1961, the colors of the Travers winner have been painted onto a canoe which sits on a pond in the infield. The canoe itself has been a fixture at the track since 1926.

== Notable moments ==
The 1921 Travers Stakes is known for a betting scandal. In those days, bookmaking rather than parimutuel wagering was the primary method of taking bets on horse races.

The original field was fairly light with the favorite, the filly Prudery, owned by Harry Payne Whitney, facing no serious competition. Then Arnold Rothstein entered his colt, Sporting Blood, ostensibly to pick up second place. A few days before the race, however, Rothstein had learned that Prudery was off her feed. He knew he might have a real chance to win. Initially, the odds on the filly were 1-4, while Rothstein's colt was 5–2. On the day of the race, however, a leading three-year-old, Grey Lag, was entered by trainer Sam Hildreth. Grey Lag immediately became the favorite, with Prudery the second choice, driving the odds on Sporting Blood up to 3–1. Rothstein bet $150,000 on his horse. Just before post time, Grey Lag was scratched with no explanation. During the race, Sporting Blood overtook the ailing Prudery, gaining his owner nearly half a million dollars, including wagers and the purse.

Although many smelled foul play, it was never proven that Hildreth received any payoff or that there was a conspiracy between him and Rothstein.

In 1941, Whirlaway became the only horse ever to win both the American Triple Crown and the Travers Stakes, sometimes referred to as a " superfecta".

In 1962, Jaipur won by a nose-bob in track record time over the arguably more talented Ridan after a long, head-to-head battle over the entire mile and a quarter. Still written and talked about today, the race is listed in the 2006 book Horse Racing's Top 100 Moments written by the staff of Blood-Horse Publications. The race result determined which colt would be named the 1962 U.S. Champion 3-Year-Old Horse.

In 1978, Affirmed finished the Travers ahead of rival Alydar but was disqualified for crowding Alydar off the rail. Alydar was awarded the win. It was the last of 10 times the two would race each other in one of the sport's greatest rivalries.

In 1982, Runaway Groom, the Champion Canadian Three year old arrived at Saratoga after competing in the Canadian Triple Crown, having won the Prince of Wales Stakes and Breeders' Stakes, and finishing second in the Queen's Plate. At the Travers that year, Runaway Groom became the second horse in racing history to beat the three winners of the Triple Crown series in the same race, defeating Kentucky Derby winner Gato Del Sol, Preakness Stakes winner Aloma's Ruler, and Belmont Stakes winner Conquistador Cielo. Sun Briar was the first to do so in the 1918 Travers Stakes.

The 1997 Travers saw U.S. Racing Hall of Fame jockeys Jerry Bailey and Chris McCarron (aboard Behrens and Deputy Commander respectively) in a home-stretch duel wherein Deputy Commander prevailed. Adding to the drama was a thunderstorm which produced hail 24 hours before the race, and the uncertainty around whether or not McCarron would be present after the recent death of his mother.

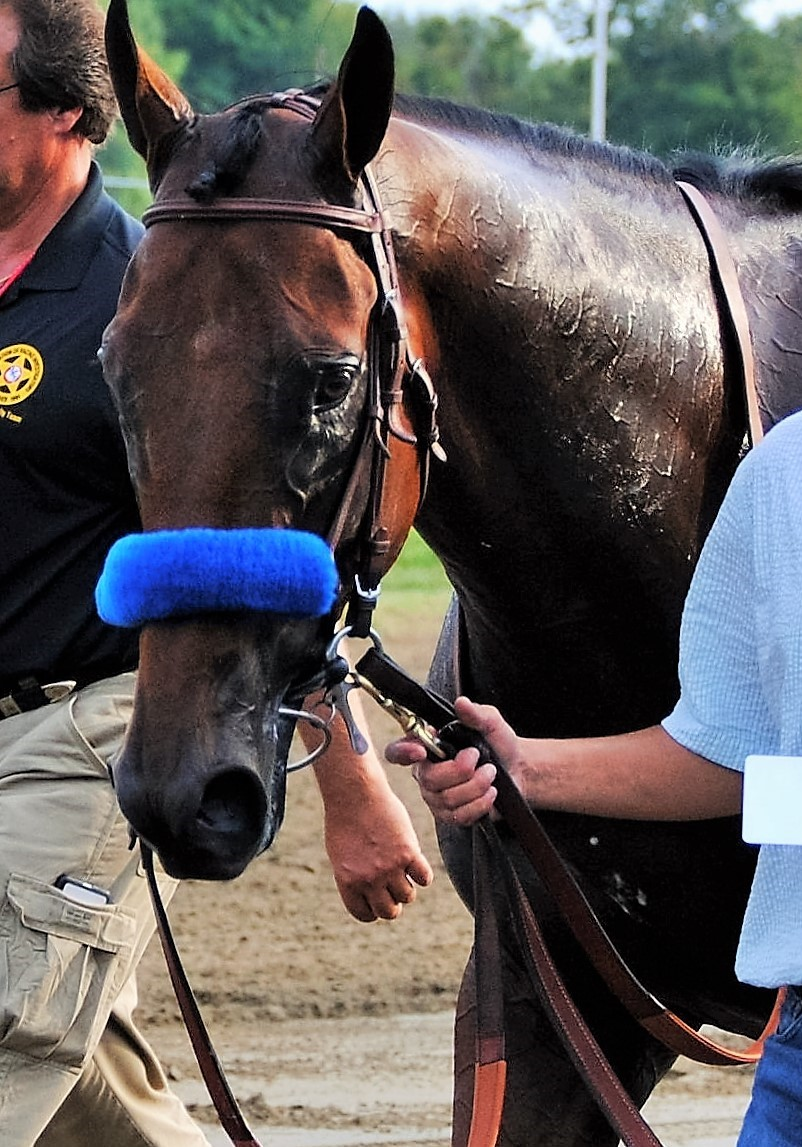
American Pharoah after his defeat in the 2015 Travers

In 2001, Point Given won the Travers before a record Travers Stakes day attendance of 60,486. The total betting handle was $34,529,273, which was a Saratoga record at that time.

On August 25, 2012, Alpha and Golden Ticket finished in a dead heat for first place – meaning they could not be separated in the photo finish. Following the race, two canoes were put in the infield pond to commemorate the winners. It was the first official tie in the race's history and the winning owners split the $800,000 first-place prize money. In 1874, Attila and Acrobat dead heated but were forced to run off to break the tie.

On August 29, 2015, the 146th Travers Stakes saw Triple Crown winner American Pharoah race in front of a NYRA capped crowd of 50,000, making the event a sellout for the first time ever. In addition, the purse was raised to $1.6 million. The race reaffirmed Saratoga's reputation as the "graveyard of champions" when Keen Ice defeated American Pharoah.

In 2016, The 147th Travers was equally notable as Arrogate rolled home to win by 13 1/2 lengths and set a new stakes record, finishing the race in 1:59:36. Arrogate's victory helped Bob Baffert to avenge his loss the previous year with American Pharoah.

In 2023, Arcangelo by Arrogate won the 154th Travers trained by Jena Antonucci, the first woman to have a horse she trained win one of the three races in American horse racing's triple crown. The horse was ridden in the 2023 Belmont Stakes by jockey Javier Castellano, winner aboard Mage in the 2023 Kentucky Derby. Arcangelo was shipped to the Saratoga Race Course where he won the Travers. by one length in a time of 2:02.23 over a muddy track making Antonucci the second female to win the race in its 154-year history. The horse was ridden by jockey Javier Castellano who set a record of seven winnings in the race.

In 2024, Thorpedo Anna competed in the 155th Travers looking to become the first filly to win this race since 1915. Despite a late challenge down the home stretch, Fierceness ended up winning the race, defeating her by a nose at the wire.

In 2025, Sovereignty become the first horse to win the Kentucky Derby, Belmont Stakes & Travers Stakes in the same year since 1995. Only five horses were entered in to the 2025 race, making it the smallest field since 1994.

== Records ==
Speed record: (at current distance of 1 1/4 miles)

- 1:59.36 – Arrogate (2016)

Most wins by a jockey:

- 7 – Javier Castellano (2006, 2010, 2011, 2014, 2015, 2018, 2023)

Most wins by a trainer:

- 5 – Bert Mulholland (1939, 1950, 1951, 1962, 1963)

Most wins by an owner:

- 5 – Dwyer Brothers Stable (1881, 1883, 1886, 1888, 1890)
- 5 – George D. Widener Jr. (1939, 1950, 1951, 1962, 1963)
- 5 – Rokeby Stable (1964, 1969, 1972, 1987, 1993)

Record victory margin:

- 22 lengths – Damascus (1967)

== Winners ==
Year	Winner	Jockey	Trainer	Owner	Distance (Miles)	Time	Win $	Gr.
2026	Leading Change	Manuel Franco	Brad H. Cox	Wathnan Racing	1-1/4 m	2:02.98	$687,000	G1
2025	Sovereignty	Junior Alvarado	William I. Mott	Godolphin	1-1/4 m	2:00.84	$687,000	G1
2024	Fierceness	John R. Velazquez	Todd A. Pletcher	Repole Stable	1-1/4 m	2:01.79	$687,000	G1
2023	Arcangelo	Javier Castellano	Jena Antonucci	Blue Rose Farm	1-1/4 m	2:02.23	$687,500	G1
2022	Epicenter	Joel Rosario	Steven M. Asmussen	Winchell Thoroughbreds	1-1/4 m	2:00.72	$670,000	G1
2021	Essential Quality	Luis Saez	Brad H. Cox	Godolphin	1-1/4 m	2:01.96	$670,000	G1
2020	Tiz the Law	Manuel Franco	Barclay Tagg	Sackatoga Stable	1-1/4 m	2:00.95	$535,000	G1
2019	Code of Honor	John R. Velazquez	Claude R. McGaughey III	William S. Farish III	1-1/4 m	2:01.05	$670,000	G1
2018	Catholic Boy	Javier Castellano	Jonathan Thomas	Robert V. LaPenta, Madaket Stables, Siena Farm, Twin Creeks Racing Stables	1-1/4 m	2:01.94	$670,000	G1
2017	West Coast	Mike E. Smith	Bob Baffert	Gary & Mary West	1-1/4 m	2:01.19	$670,000	G1
2016	Arrogate	Mike E. Smith	Bob Baffert	Juddmonte Farms	1-1/4 m	1:59.36	$670,000	G1
2015	Keen Ice	Javier Castellano	Dale Romans	Donegal Racing	1-1/4 m	2:01.57	$670,000	G1
2014	V.E. Day	Javier Castellano	James A. Jerkens	Magalen Bryant	1-1/4 m	2:02.98	$670,000	G1
2013	Will Take Charge	Luis Saez	D. Wayne Lukas	Willis D. Horton	1-1/4 m	2:02.68	$600,000	G1
2012	Alpha; Golden Ticket (DH)	Ramon Domínguez; David Cohen	Kiaran McLaughlin; Ken McPeek	Godolphin; Magic City Thoroughbreds	1-1/4 m	2:02.74	$400,000 $400,000	G1
2011	Stay Thirsty	Javier Castellano	Todd A. Pletcher	Repole Stable	1-1/4 m	2:03.03	$600,000	G1
2010	Afleet Express	Javier Castellano	James A. Jerkens	Gainesway Farm	1-1/4 m	2:03.28	$600,000	G1
2009	Summer Bird	Kent Desormeaux	Tim Ice	Kalarikkal & Vilasini Jayaraman	1-1/4 m	2:02.83	$600,000	G1
2008	Colonel John	Garrett K. Gomez	Eoin G. Harty	WinStar Farm	1-1/4 m	2:03.20	$600,000	G1
2007	Street Sense	Calvin Borel	Carl Nafzger	James B. Tafel	1-1/4 m	2:02.69	$600,000	G1
2006	Bernardini	Javier Castellano	Thomas Albertrani	Darley Stable	1-1/4 m	2:01.60	$600,000	G1
2005	Flower Alley	John R. Velazquez	Todd A. Pletcher	Melnyk Racing Stables	1-1/4 m	2:02.76	$600,000	G1
2004	Birdstone	Edgar Prado	Nick Zito	Marylou Whitney Stables	1-1/4 m	2:02.45	$600,000	G1
2003	Ten Most Wanted	Pat Day	Wallace Dollase	J. Paul Reddam	1-1/4 m	2:02.14	$600,000	G1
2002	Medaglia d'Oro	Jerry Bailey	Robert J. Frankel	Edmund A. Gann	1-1/4 m	2:02.53	$600,000	G1
2001	Point Given	Gary Stevens	Bob Baffert	The Thoroughbred Corp.	1-1/4 m	2:01.40	$600,000	G1
2000	Unshaded	Shane Sellers	Carl Nafzger	James B. Tafel	1-1/4 m	2:02.59	$600,000	G1
1999	Lemon Drop Kid	José A. Santos	Flint S. Schulhofer	Jeanne G. Vance	1-1/4 m	2:02.00	$600,000	G1
1998	Coronado's Quest	Mike E. Smith	Claude R. McGaughey III	Stuart S. Janney III	1-1/4 m	2:03.40	$450,000	G1
1997	Deputy Commander	Chris McCarron	Wallace Dollase	Horizon Stable	1-1/4 m	2:04.00	$450,000	G1
1996	Will's Way	Jorge F. Chavez	H. James Bond	William Clifton Jr.	1-1/4 m	2:02.40	$450,000	G1
1995	Thunder Gulch	Gary Stevens	D. Wayne Lukas	Michael Tabor	1-1/4 m	2:03.40	$450,000	G1
1994	Holy Bull	Mike E. Smith	Warren A. Croll Jr.	Warren A. Croll Jr.	1-1/4 m	2:02.00	$450,000	G1
1993	Sea Hero	Jerry Bailey	MacKenzie Miller	Rokeby Stable	1-1/4 m	2:01.80	$600,000	G1
1992	Thunder Rumble	Herb McCauley	Richard O'Connell	Braeburn Farm	1-1/4 m	2:00.99	$600,000	G1
1991	Corporate Report	Chris McCarron	D. Wayne Lukas	William T. Young	1-1/4 m	2:01.20	$600,000	G1
1990	Rhythm	Craig Perret	Claude R. McGaughey III	Ogden Phipps	1-1/4 m	2:02.60	$707,100	G1
1989	Easy Goer	Pat Day	Claude R. McGaughey III	Ogden Phipps	1-1/4 m	2:00.80	$653,100	G1
1988	Forty Niner	Chris McCarron	Woody Stephens	Claiborne Farm	1-1/4 m	2:01.40	$653,500	G1
1987	Java Gold	Pat Day	MacKenzie Miller	Rokeby Stable	1-1/4 m	2:02.00	$673,800	G1
1986	Wise Times	Jerry Bailey	Phil Gleaves	Russell L. Reineman Stables	1-1/4 m	2:03.40	$203,700	G1
1985	Chief's Crown	Ángel Cordero Jr.	Roger Laurin	Star Crown Stable	1-1/4 m	2:01.20	$202,800	G1
1984	Carr de Naskra	Laffit Pincay Jr.	Richard J. Lundy	Virginia Kraft Payson	1-1/4 m	2:02.60	$184,500	G1
1983	Play Fellow	Pat Day	Harvey L. Vanier	Carl Lauer	1-1/4 m	2:01.00	$135,000	G1
1982	Runaway Groom	Jeffrey Fell	John A. DiMario	Albert Coppola Sr.	1-1/4 m	2:02.60	$132,900	G1
1981	Willow Hour	Eddie Maple	James E. Picou	Marcia Whitney Schott	1-1/4 m	2:03.60	$135,600	G1
1980	Temperence Hill	Eddie Maple	Joseph B. Cantey	Loblolly Stable	1-1/4 m	2:02.80	$100,980	G1
1979	General Assembly	Jacinto Vásquez	LeRoy Jolley	Bertram R. Firestone	1-1/4 m	2:00.00	$80,850	G1
1978	Alydar	Jorge Velásquez	John M. Veitch	Calumet Farm	1-1/4 m	2:02.00	$62,880	G1
1977	Jatski	Sam Maple	William A. Cole	William H. Murray	1-1/4 m	2:01.60	$68,160	G1
1976	Honest Pleasure	Craig Perret	LeRoy Jolley	Bertram R. Firestone	1-1/4 m	2:00.20	$65,040	G1
1975	Wajima	Braulio Baeza	Stephen A. DiMauro	East-West Stable	1-1/4 m	2:02.00	$65,220	G1
1974	Holding Pattern	Michael Miceli	James J. Sarner Jr.	John Gerbas Jr.	1-1/4 m	2:05.20	$69,660	G1
1973	Annihilate 'Em	Ron Turcotte	Douglas Davis Jr.	Patricia B. Blass	1-1/4 m	2:02.40	$68,280	G1
1972	Key To The Mint	Braulio Baeza	J. Elliott Burch	Rokeby Stable	1-1/4 m	2:01.20	$66,600	
1971	Bold Reason	Laffit Pincay Jr.	Angel Penna Sr.	William A. Levin	1-1/4 m	2:02.40	$66,420	
1970	Loud	Jacinto Vásquez	James W. Maloney	William Haggin Perry	1-1/4 m	2:01.00	$73,385	
1969	Arts and Letters	Braulio Baeza	J. Elliott Burch	Rokeby Stable	1-1/4 m	2:01.60	$69,290	
1968	Chompion	Jean Cruguet	Ivor G. Balding	Cornelius V. Whitney	1-1/4 m	2:04.80	$55,802	
1967	Damascus	Bill Shoemaker	Frank Y. Whiteley Jr.	Edith W. Bancroft	1-1/4 m	2:01.60	$52,065	
1966	Buckpasser	Braulio Baeza	Edward A. Neloy	Ogden Phipps	1-1/4 m	2:01.60	$53,690	
1965	Hail To All	Johnny Sellers	Eddie Yowell	Zelda Cohen	1-1/4 m	2:02.20	$56,777	
1964	Quadrangle	Manuel Ycaza	J. Elliott Burch	Rokeby Stable	1-1/4 m	2:04.40	$52,033	
1963	Crewman	Eric Guerin	Bert Mulholland	George D. Widener Jr.	1-1/4 m	2:02.40	$52,910	
1962	Jaipur	Bill Shoemaker	Bert Mulholland	George D. Widener Jr.	1-1/4 m	2:01.60	$53,722	
1961	Beau Prince	Steve Brooks	Horace A. Jones	Calumet Farm	1-1/4 m	2:03.00	$54,210	
1960	Tompion	Bill Hartack	John J. Greely Jr.	Cornelius V. Whitney	1-1/4 m	2:03.40	$53,165	
1959	Sword Dancer	Manuel Ycaza	J. Elliott Burch	Brookmeade Stable	1-1/4 m	2:04.20	$51,962	
1958	Piano Jim	Bobby Ussery	Oscar White	Sarah F. Jeffords	1-1/4 m	2:05.80	$29,920	
1957	Gallant Man	Bill Shoemaker	John A. Nerud	Ralph Lowe	1-1/4 m	2:04.00	$29,500	
1956	Oh Johnny	Hedley Woodhouse	Norman R. McLeod	Helene D. Gilroy	1-1/4 m	2:06.20	$33,200	
1955	Thinking Cap	Paul J. Bailey	Henry S. Clark	Christiana Stable	1-1/4 m	2:06.40	$19,150	
1954	Fisherman	Hedley Woodhouse	Sylvester Veitch	Cornelius V. Whitney	1-1/4 m	2:06.00	$19,500	
1953	Native Dancer	Eric Guerin	William C. Winfrey	Alfred G. Vanderbilt II	1-1/4 m	2:05.60	$18,850	
1952	One Count	Eric Guerin	Oscar White	Sarah F. Jeffords	1-1/4 m	2:07.40	$16,450	
1951	Battlefield	Eddie Arcaro	Bert Mulholland	George D. Widener Jr.	1-1/4 m	2:06.20	$15,000	
1950	Lights Up	George Hettinger	Bert Mulholland	George D. Widener Jr.	1-1/4 m	2:03.00	$16,350	
1949	Arise	Con Errico	James C. Bentley	Addison Stable (Harry Addison Sr. & Mrs. Jack Addison)	1-1/4 m	2:06.20	$16,600	
1948	Ace Admiral	Ted Atkinson	James W. Smith	Maine Chance Farm	1-1/4 m	2:05.00	$19,650	
1947	Young Peter	Thomas May	George M. Odom	Cornelia Gerry	1-1/4 m	2:06.20	$19,375	
1946	Natchez	Ted Atkinson	Oscar White	Sarah F. Jeffords	1-1/4 m	2:08.00	$24,750	
1945	Adonis	Conn McCreary	Willie Booth	William G. Helis	1-1/4 m	2:02.80	$28,680	
1944	By Jimminy	Eddie Arcaro	James W. Smith	Alfred P. Parker	1-1/4 m	2:03.40	$25,015	
1943	Eurasian	Steve Brooks	Sol Rutchick	Mill River Stable	1-1/4 m	2:03.80	$19,850	
1942	Shut Out	Eddie Arcaro	John M. Gaver Sr.	Greentree Stable	1-1/4 m	2:04.40	$17,825	
1941	Whirlaway*	Alfred Robertson	Ben A. Jones	Calumet Farm	1-1/4 m	2:05.80	$16,900	
1940	Fenelon	James Stout	Jim Fitzsimmons	Belair Stud	1-1/4 m	2:04.40	$17,425	
1939	Eight Thirty	Harry Richards	Bert Mulholland	George D. Widener Jr.	1-1/4 m	2:06.60	$16,575	
1938	Thanksgiving	Eddie Arcaro	Mary Hirsch	Anne Corning	1-1/4 m	2:03.60	$14,400	
1937	Burning Star	Wayne D. Wright	John J. Greely	Shandon Farm Stables (Patrick A. & Richard J. Nash)	1-1/4 m	2:04.80	$14,550	
1936	Granville	James Stout	James E. Fitzsimmons	Belair Stud	1-1/4 m	2:05.80	$14,700	
1935	Gold Foam	Silvio Coucci	John M. Milburn	Starmount Stable (Edward Benjamin)	1-1/4 m	2:04.60	$14,675	
1934	Observant	Lee Humphries	Max Hirsch	Morton L. Schwartz	1-1/4 m	2:05.60	$14,650	
1933	Inlander	Robert Jones	Robert A. Smith	Brookmeade Stable	1-1/4 m	2:08.00	$21,050	
1932	War Hero	John Gilbert	George Conway	Glen Riddle Farm	1-1/4 m	2:05.80	$23,150	
1931	Twenty Grand	Linus McAtee	James G. Rowe Jr.	Greentree Stable	1-1/4 m	2:04.60	$33,000	
1930	Jim Dandy	Frank Baker	James B. McKee	Chaffee Earl	1-1/4 m	2:08.00	$27,050	
1929	Beacon Hill	Alfred Robertson	James G. Rowe Jr.	Harry P. Whitney	1-1/4 m	2:04.20	$31,825	
1928	Petee-Wrack	Steve O'Donnell	Willie Booth	John R. Macomber	1-1/4 m	2:08.00	$30,555	
1927	Brown Bud	Laverne Fator	Alfred J. Gunther	Frederick Johnson	1-1/4 m	2:05.60	$29,925	
1926	Mars	Frank Coltiletti	Scott P. Harlan	Sarah F. Jeffords	1-1/4 m	2:04.60	$15,050	
1925	Dangerous	Clarence Kummer	William B. Duke	Gifford A. Cochran	1-1/4 m	2:10.80	$13,425	
1924	Sun Flag	Frank Keogh	Carroll H. Shilling	Gifford A. Cochran	1-1/4 m	2:04.40	$14,675	
1923	Wilderness	Benny Marinelli	Thomas J. Healey	Richard T. Wilson Jr.	1-1/4 m	2:04.00	$13,500	
1922	Little Chief	Laverne Fator	Sam Hildreth	Rancocas Stable	1-1/4 m	2:13.40	$11,325	
1921	Sporting Blood	Lawrence Lyke	Willie Booth	Redstone Stable	1-1/4 m	2:05.80	$10,275	
1920	Man o' War	Andy Schuttinger	Louis Feustel	Glen Riddle Farm	1-1/4 m	2:01.80	$9,275	
1919	Hannibal	Lavelle Ensor	Thomas J. Healey	Richard T. Wilson Jr.	1-1/4 m	2:02.80	$9,835	
1918	Sun Briar	Willie Knapp	Henry McDaniel	Willis Sharpe Kilmer	1-1/4 m	2:03.20	$7,700	
1917	Omar Khayyam	James Butwell	Richard F. Carmen	Wilfrid Viau	1-1/4 m	2:08.80	$5,350	
1916	Spur	Johnny Loftus	John H. McCormack	James Butler	1-1/4 m	2:05.00	$3,125	
1915	Lady Rotha	Mack Garner	A. J. Goldsborough	Andrew Miller	1-1/4 m	2:11.40	$2,150	
1914	Roamer	James H. Butwell	A. J. Goldsborough	Andrew Miller	1-1/4 m	2:04.00	$3,000	
1913	Rock View	Thomas McTaggart	Louis Feustel	August Belmont Jr.	1-1/4 m	2:06.60	$2,725	
1911 - 1912	Race not held							
1910	Dalmatian	Carroll H. Shilling	Sam Hildreth	Sam Hildreth	1-1/4 m	2:10.00	$4,825	
1909	Hilarious	Richard Scoville	James G. Rowe Sr.	James R. Keene	1-1/4 m	2:06.00	$5,800	
1908	Dorante	James Lee	Raleigh Colston Jr.	Frederick A. Forsythe	1-1/4 m	2:09.60	$5,800	
1907	Frank Gill	Joe Notter	John I. Smith	Jack L. McGinnis	1-1/4 m	2:07.00	$5,800	
1906	Gallavant	Walter Miller	Thomas J. Healey	Richard T. Wilson Jr.	1-1/4 m	2:08.20	$5,800	
1905	Dandelion	Willie Shaw	John E. Madden	Francis R. Hitchock	1-1/4 m	2:08.00	$8,350	
1904	Broomstick	Tommy Burns	Robert Tucker	Samuel S. Brown	1-1/4 m	2:06.80	$5,850	
1903	Ada Nay	Frank O'Neill	A. Jack Joyner	James B. A. Haggin	1-1/8 m	1:57.00	$8,150	
1902	Hermis	Bruce Rice	John H. McCormack	Henry M. Ziegler	1-1/8 m	1:54.80	$6,750	
1901	Blues	Willie Shaw	Thomas Welsh	C. Fleischmann Sons	1-1/8 m	1:56.60	$6,750	
1900	Race not held							
1899	Race not held							
1898	Race not held							
1897	Rensselaer	Fred Taral	Henry Harris	John E. McDonald	1-1/8 m	1:56.60	$1,425	
1896	Race not held							
1895	Liza	Henry Griffin	John Huggins	Pierre Lorillard IV	1-1/8 m	1:55.50	$1,125	
1894	Henry of Navarre	Fred Taral	Byron McClelland	Byron McClelland	1-1/4 m	2:10.25	$2,350	
1893	Stowaway	Lawrence McDermott	H. H. Brandt	Woodland Stable	1-1/4 m	2:10.75	$2,450	
1892	Azra	Alonzo Clayton	John H. Morris	Bashford Manor Stable	1-1/2 m	2:43.75	$2,750	
1891	Vallera	Robert Williams	Enoch Wishard	Scoggan Bros. (George W., Hiram J., John)	1-1/2 m	2:49.00	$2,900	
1890	Sir John	Marty Bergen	Frank McCabe	Dwyer Brothers Stable	1-1/2 m	2:39.00	$4,925	
1889	Long Dance	Shelby Barnes	G. M. Rye	G. M. Rye	1-3/4 m	3:08.75	$3,700	
1888	Sir Dixon	Jim McLaughlin	Frank McCabe	Dwyer Brothers Stable	1-3/4 m	3:07.75	$4,625	
1887	Carey	Harry Blaylock	Edward Corrigan	Edward Corrigan	1-3/4 m	3:17.75	$4,625	
1886	Inspector B	Jim McLaughlin	Frank McCabe	Dwyer Brothers Stable	1-3/4 m	3:10.25	$3,825	
1885	Bersan	John Spellman	Green B. Morris	Green B. Morris	1-3/4 m	3:08.25	$4,025	
1884	Rataplan	William Fitzpatrick	Frank Midgley	Norman W. Kittson	1-3/4 m	3:07.50	$4,150	
1883	Barnes	Jim McLaughlin	James G. Rowe Sr.	Dwyer Brothers Stable	1-3/4 m	3:18.00	$3,400	
1882	Carley B	George Quantrell	H. Welch	A. Burnham	1-3/4 m	3:28.75	$3,450	
1881	Hindoo	Jim McLaughlin	James G. Rowe Sr.	Dwyer Brothers Stable	1-3/4 m	3:07.50	$2,950	
1880	Grenada	Lloyd Hughes	R. Wyndham Walden	George L. Lorillard	1-3/4 m	3:12.50	$3,750	
1879	Falsetto	Isaac Burns Murphy	Eli Jordan	J. W. Hunt Reynolds	1-3/4 m	3:09.25	$4,950	
1878	Duke of Magenta	Lloyd Hughes	R. Wyndham Walden	George L. Lorillard	1-3/4 m	3:08.00	$4,250	
1877	Baden-Baden	Tom Sayres	James Williams	William Astor Jr.	1-3/4 m	3:15.50	$3,700	
1876	Sultana	William Hayward	John W. McClelland	August Belmont Sr.	1-3/4 m	3:15.50	$3,700	
1875	D'Artagnan	George Barbee	J. B. Pryor	James A. Grinstead	1-3/4 m	3:06.50	$4,850	
1874	Attila	George Barbee	William Pryor	Pierre Lorillard IV	1-3/4 m	3:09.50	$5,050	
1873	Tom Bowling	Robert Swim	Ansel Williamson	H. Price McGrath	1-3/4 m	3:09.75	$5,400	
1872	Joe Daniels	James G. Rowe Sr.	David McDaniel	David McDaniel	1-3/4 m	3:08.25	$5,500	
1871	Harry Bassett	W. Miller	David McDaniel	David McDaniel	1-3/4 m	3:21.60	$5,600	
1870	Kingfisher	Charles Miller	Raleigh Colston Sr.	Daniel Swigert	1-3/4 m	3:15.25	$4,950	
1869	Glenelg	Charles Miller	Jacob Pincus	August Belmont	1-3/4 m	3:14.00	$3,000	
1868	The Banshee	Smith	J. H. Davis	John M. Clay	1-3/4 m	3:10.75	$3,150	
1867	Ruthless	Gilbert W. Patrick	A. Jackson Minor	Francis Morris	1-3/4 m	3:18.25	$2,850	
1866	Merrill	Abe Hawkins	Ansel Williamson	Robert A. Alexander	1-3/4 m	3:29.00	$3,500	
1865	Maiden	W. Sewell	T. G. Moore	T. G. Moore	1-3/4 m	3:18.50	$3,400	
1864	Kentucky	Gilbert W. Patrick	A. Jackson Minor	John Hunter & William R. Travers	1-3/4 m	3:18.75	$2,950	

- To date, Whirlaway is the only Triple Crown winner to win the Travers Stakes.

== Sire lines ==
Winners of the Travers Stakes can be connected to each other due to the practice of arranging horse breeding based on their previous success. All of the horses can be traced back to the three foundational sires, with Godolphin Arabian the ancestor of 14 winners, Byerley Turk the ancestor of 14 winners, and Darley Arabian the ancestor of 130 winners, including all winners since 2009.

The Mr Prospector direct sire line has won three of the last four Travers Stakes, most recently Leading Change in 2026.

=== Darley Arabian sire line ===
- the Darley Arabian (1700c) sire line (all branched through the Eclipse (1764) line) produced 130 Stakes winners (123 colts, 4 geldings, 3 fillies), including all winners from 2009 to present. The main branches of this sire line are:
  - the King Fergus (1775) branch (all branched through the Voltigeur (1847) line), produced 15 winners. His sire line continued primarily through his son Vedette (1854) with 12 winners, due primarily to his son Galopin (1872) with 8 winners (exclusively through St. Simon (1881), most recently Thunder Rumble in 1992)
  - the Potoooooooo (1773) branch produced 115 winners (all branched through the Waxy (1790) line). The primary branch of this sire line is through Whalebone (1807), which has produced 112 winners. In turn, the primary branch continues through Sir Hercules (1826), which has produced 86 winners, and then the Birdcatcher (1833) branch which produced 78 winners. From Birdcatcher, the branch of The Baron (1842) has produced 76 winners (exclusively through the Stockwell (1849) line). Birdcatcher's grandson Doncaster (1870) sired Bend Or (1877), whose sire line accounts for 68 winners. The main branch of the Bend Or sire line continued through his son Bona Vista (1889) with 56 winners, exclusively through the Phalaris (1913) line, which has dominated in the last several decades (including all winners from 2009 to present) through the following sons:
    - the Pharamond (1925) branch (4 winners, most recently Chompion in 1968);
    - the Sickle (1924) branch (24 winners exclusively through Native Dancer (1950) with his win in the 1953 Travers Stakes, exclusively through his son Raise a Native (1961) with 23 winners, down through Mr Prospector (1970) with 20 winners through 9 different sons: Rhythm, with his win in the 1990 Travers Stakes, and 8 other sons through their progeny, with his son Fappiano (1977) (exclusively through his son Unbridled (1987)) with 7 winners, most recently Leading Change in 2026);
    - the Pharos (1920) branch, (28 winners all branched through the Nearco (1935) line, through his sons Royal Charger (1942), Nearctic (1954), and Nasrullah (1940)). The Royal Charger branch (exclusively through the Hail To Reason (1958) line) produced 5 winners (most recently Catholic Boy in 2018), the Nearctic branch produced 8 winners (exclusively through his son Northern Dancer (1961), most recently Sovereignty in 2025), while the Nasrullah branch produced 15 winners primarily due to his son Bold Ruler (1954) with 10 winners (primarily through his son Boldnesian (1963) with 6 winners (exclusively through the A.P. Indy (1989) line), most recently Essential Quality in 2021).
    - special notes:
      - the Whalebone (1807) branch produced two main lines: the primary branch of Sir Hercules (1826), and the secondary branch of Camel (1822) which produced 21 winners (exclusively through the Touchstone (1831) line). The Camel branch continued primarily through two of this grandsons: the Orlando (1841) branch (8 winners, primarily through Himyar (1875) with 6 winners, most recently Holy Bull in 1994) and the Newminster (1848) branch (11 winners, primarily through the Bay Ronald (1893) line with 6 winners, most recently Loud in 1970). A third branch through Whalebone is via Waverley (exclusively through the Ben Brush (1893) line) which produced 5 winners, most recently Thinking Cap in 1955.
      - the Sir Hercules (1826) branch produced two main lines: the primary branch of Birdcatcher (1833), and the secondary branch of Faugh-a-Ballagh (1841) which produced 6 winners (exclusively through the Leamington (1853) line), most recently 1894 Travers Stakes winner Henry of Navarre.
      - the Stockwell (1849) branch produced two main lines: the primary branch of Doncaster (1870), and the secondary branch of St Albans (1857) which produced 5 winners (exclusively through the Rock Sand (1900) line), most recently 1963 Travers Stakes winner Crewman.
      - the Bend Or (1877) branch produced two main lines: the primary branch of Bona Vista (1889), and the secondary branch of Ormonde (1883) which produced 8 winners (exclusively through the Teddy (1913) line), most recently 1991 Travers Stakes winner Corporate Report.

=== Godolphin Arabian sire line ===
- the Godolphin Arabian (1724c) sire line produced 14 winners (13 colts, 1 filly). The main branches of this sire (all branched through the West Australian (1850) line) are:
  - the Solon (1861) branch produced 3 winners, most recently Thanksgiving in 1938)
  - the Australian (1858) branch produced 11 winners, including:
    - Joe Daniels (1869), winner of the 1872 Travers Stakes
    - Attila (1871), winner of the 1874 Travers Stakes
    - Baden-Baden (1874), winner of the 1877 Travers Stakes
    - the Springbok (1870) branch produced 1 winner (most recently of the Vallera in 1891)
    - the Spendthrift (1876) branch produced 7 winners including:
      - Stowaway (1890), winner of the 1893 Travers Stakes
      - the Hastings (1893) branch produced 6 winners (exclusively through the Fair Play (1905) line), including 1921 Travers Stakes winner Sporting Blood (1918) and 5 winners through the Man o' War (1917) line, including his win in the 1920 Travers Stakes, and 4 direct male progeny, most recently Colonel John in 2008.

=== Byerley Turk sire line ===
- the Byerley Turk (1680c) sire line produced 14 winners (10 colts, 1 gelding, 3 fillies). The main branches of this sire (all branched through the Herod (1758) line) are:
  - the Woodpecker (1773) branch produced 4 winners (all branched through the Buzzard (1787) line). The main branches of this sire line are:
    - the Castrel (1801) branch produced 1 winner, most recently Sir John in 1890
    - the Selim (1802) branch produced 3 winners (all branched through the Virgil (1864) line). The main branches of this sire are:
      - Carley B (1879), winner of the 1882 Travers Stakes
      - the Hindoo (1878) branch produced 2 winners, including his win in the 1878 Travers Stakes, and 1 direct sire line progeny, most recently Dandelion in 1905
  - the Florizel (1768) branch produced 10 winners, all branched through the Lexington (1850) line. Lexington sired 9 winners plus one additional direct sire line progeny, including:
    - Kentucky, winner of the 1864 Travers Stakes
    - Maiden, winner of the 1865 Travers Stakes
    - Merrill, winner of the 1866 Travers Stakes
    - The Banshee, winner of the 1868 Travers Stakes
    - Kingfisher, winner of the 1870 Travers Stakes
    - Harry Bassett, winner of the 1871 Travers Stakes
    - Tom Bowling, winner of the 1873 Travers Stakes
    - the Lightning branch produced 1 winner (most recently D' Artagnan in 1875)
    - Sultana, winner of the 1876 Travers Stakes
    - Duke of Magenta, winner of the 1878 Travers Stakes

Travers Stakes winners with male-line descendants including other Travers Stakes winners

- Native Dancer (1953 winner) – 20 colts; most recently Arrogate (2015)
- Man o' War (1920 winner) – 4 colts; most recently Colonel John (2008)
- Broomstick (1904 winner) – 3 colts; most recently Arise (1949)
- Eight Thirty (1939 winner) – 2 colts; most recently Crewman (1963)
- Sword Dancer (1959 winner) – 2 colts; most recently Corporate Report (1991)
- Alydar (1988 winner) – 2 colts; most recently Will's Way (1996)
- Forty Niner (1988 winner) – 2 colts; most recently Flower Alley (2005)
- Bernardini (2006 winner) – 2 colts; most recently Alpha (2012)
- Sir Dixon (1888 winner) – 1 colt; Blues (1901)
- Hindoo (1881 winner) – 1 colt; Dandelion (1905)
- Sun Briar (1918 winner) – 1 colt; Sun Flag (1924)
- Tompion (1960 winner) – 1 colt; Chompion (1968)
- Jaipur (1962 winner) – 1 colt; Jatski (1977)
- Key to the Mint (1972 winner) – 1 colt; Java Gold (1987)
- Damascus (1967 winner) – 1 colt; Corporate Report (1991)
- Spur (1916 winner) – 1 colt; Holy Bull (1994)
- Easy Goer (1989 winner) – 1 colt; Will's Way (1996)
- Thunder Gulch (1995 winner) – 1 colt; Point Given (2001)
- Deputy Commander (1997 winner) – 1 colt; Ten Most Wanted (2003)
- Birdstone (2004 winner) – 1 colt; Summer Bird (2009)

== See also ==
- Travers Stakes top three finishers and starters
- American thoroughbred racing top attended events
- Grand Slam of Thoroughbred Racing
