= Kingfisher (horse) =

19th-century American Thoroughbred racehorse

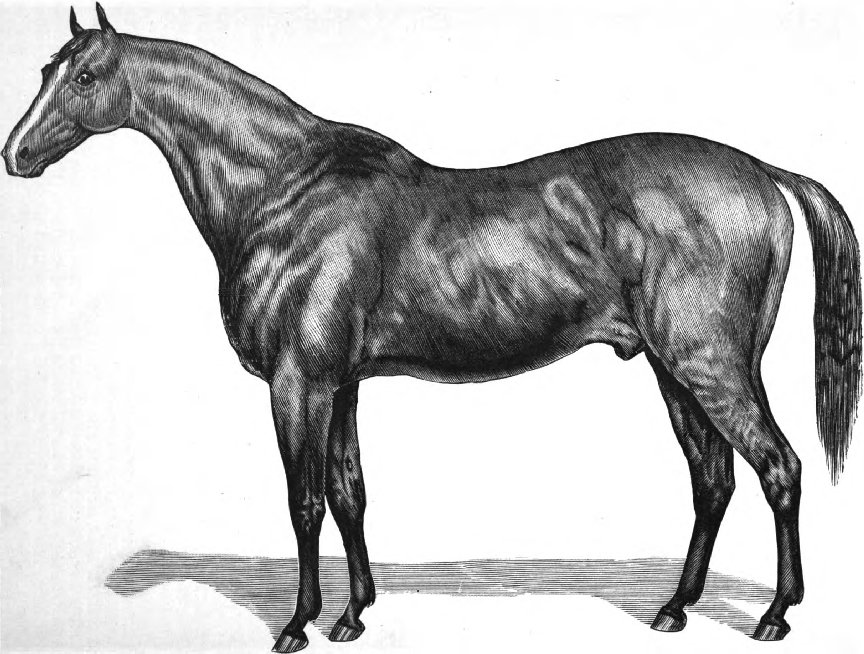
- 1877 etching by C. Lloyd
- Sire: Lexington
- Grandsire: Boston
- Dam: Eltham Lass
- Damsire: Kingston
- Sex: Stallion
- Foaled: 1867
- Country: United States
- Colour: Bay
- Breeder: Robert A. Alexander
- Owner: 1) Daniel Swigert; 2) August Belmont
- Trainer: Raleigh Colston Sr.
- Record: 13: 7-?-?
- Earnings: $26,750

Major wins
- Annual Stakes (1870); Champion Stakes (1870); Travers Stakes (1870) American Classics wins: Belmont Stakes (1870)

Kingfisher (1867–1890) was an American Thoroughbred racehorse who won the 1870 Belmont Stakes.

Kingfisher was bred by Robert A. Alexander at his Woodburn Stud in Woodford County, Kentucky, Kingfisher was out of the imported mare Eltham Lass, a daughter of Kingston. Kingfisher's sire was Lexington. He was a bay stallion.

In 1868 Kingfisher was auctioned at the 1868 Woodburn Stud yearling sale. He was purchased for $490 by Woodburn's former manager, Daniel Swigert who entrusted his race conditioning to trainer Raleigh Colston Sr. In 1870, the three-year-old Kingfisher won the Belmont Stakes at New York's Jerome Park Racetrack, in which he was ridden by Edward D. Brown. Besides the Belmont, Kingfisher won the 1870 Travers Stakes, Champion Stakes, and Annual Stakes. Daniel Swigert sold the horse to August Belmont, for $15,000.

Kingfisher raced for August Belmont in 1871 but was injured in the Saratoga Cup and did not return to racing until the following year when he met with little success.

Kingfisher started a total of 13 races, winning 7 of them, with total race earnings of $26,750.

Retired to stud duty, he sired 7 stakes winners: Belinda out of Bellona, both Lady Rosebery and Duchess out of Lady Blessington, King Crab out of Carita, King Cadmus also out of Carita, Oriole out of My Maryland, and Prince Royal out of imported mare Princess. Belinda, an 1885 chesnut mare, won the 1887 Colleen Stakes. Lady Rosebery, an 1878 chestnut mare, won the 1880 Champagne Stakes. Duchess, an 1881 bay mare, won the 1883 Sapling Stakes, the 1884 Ladies' Handicap, Monmouth Oaks, and Mermaid Stakes. King Crab, an 1885 bay stallion, won the 1888 Oceanview Handicap. King Cadmus, an 1889 bay stallion, won the 1891 Sapphire Stakes. Oriole, an 1874 chestnut mare, won the 1878 Maturity Stakes. Prince Royal, an 1885 chestnut stallion, won the 1888 Jerome Handicap, Stevens Stakes and Stockton Stakes.

He was the maternal grandsire of the following:

- Fides, the 1889 American Champion Three-Year-Old Filly.
- Clifford, the 1893 American Champion Three-Year-Old Male Horse and 1894 American Champion Older Male Horse
- George W. Jenkins, winner of the 1902 American Grand National

Kingfisher died on June 30, 1890, in Kentucky.

== Sire line tree ==
- Kingfisher
  - Turco
  - King Crab
  - Prince Royal
    - Yankee Doodle
    - The Mighty
  - King Cadmus

== Pedigree ==
Pedigree of Kingfisher
Sire Lexington 1850	Boston 1833	Timoleon	Sir Archy
Sire Lexington 1850	Boston 1833	Timoleon	Saltram Mare
Sire Lexington 1850	Boston 1833	Sister to Tuckahoe	Balls Florizel
Sire Lexington 1850	Boston 1833	Sister to Tuckahoe	Alderman Mare
Sire Lexington 1850	Alice Carneal 1836	Sarpedeon	Emilius
Sire Lexington 1850	Alice Carneal 1836	Sarpedeon	Icaria
Sire Lexington 1850	Alice Carneal 1836	Rowena	Sumpter
Sire Lexington 1850	Alice Carneal 1836	Rowena	Lady Grey
Dam Eltham Lass 1859	Kingston 1849	Venison	Partisan
Dam Eltham Lass 1859	Kingston 1849	Venison	Fawn
Dam Eltham Lass 1859	Kingston 1849	Queen Anne	Slane
Dam Eltham Lass 1859	Kingston 1849	Queen Anne	Garcia
Dam Eltham Lass 1859	Maid of Palmyra 1855	Pyrrhus The First	Epirus
Dam Eltham Lass 1859	Maid of Palmyra 1855	Pyrrhus The First	Fortress
Dam Eltham Lass 1859	Maid of Palmyra 1855	Palmyra	Sultan
Dam Eltham Lass 1859	Maid of Palmyra 1855	Palmyra	Hester

== Bibliography ==
- Bruce, S. D. (1884). American Stud Book. Vol. 1 (Revised ed.). New York: Turf, Field, and Farm. OCLC 228769751.
- Hewitt, Abram S. (1982). The Great Breeders and Their Methods. Lexington, KY: Thoroughbred Owners and Breeders Association. OCLC 12739523.
- Hogan, Clio D. (n.d.). Index to Stakes Winners 1865–1967. Solvang, CA: Flag Is Up Farms. OCLC 29213840.
- New York Racing Association (2010). "1874 Belmont Stakes" (PDF). The Belmont Stakes. New York Racing Association. Archived from the original (PDF) on October 7, 2011.
- New York Racing Association (2010). "Belmont Stakes". New York Racing Association. Archived from the original on July 7, 2011.
- Staff (1893). "1890" (PDF). The New York Clipper Annual.
