= George Barbee =

American jockey (1850–1939)

George Joseph Barbee
Personal information
- Born: 12 December 1849 Norfolk, England
- Died: October 30, 1939 (aged 89) Long Island, New York
- Occupation: Jockey
- Spouse: Hannah Barbee (1878-1939)
- Children: Neta Barbee, Willet Barbee, Beulah Barbee, Helen Barbee

Horse racing career
- Sport: Horse racing
- Career wins: 136

Major racing wins
- Monmouth Oaks (1873); Travers Stakes (1874, 1875); Saratoga Cup (1874, 1876); Champagne Stakes (1877); Ladies Handicap (1877); Long Branch Handicap (1880); Foam Stakes (1881); Champion Stakes (1882) American Classic Race wins: Belmont Stakes (1874); Preakness Stakes (1873, 1876, 1883)

Honours
- National Museum of Racing and Hall of Fame (1996)

Significant horses
- Survivor, Jacobus, Tom Ochiltree, Springbok, Shirley, Duke of Magenta, D'Artagnan, Attila, Saxon, Eole

George Joseph Barbee (December 12, 1849 – October 30, 1939) was an English-born jockey who was inducted into the National Museum of Racing and Hall of Fame in 1996. Published reports indicate Barbee lived to be 89, and is buried near Belmont Park in Elmont, New York.

Barbee began his racing career as an apprentice to Tom Jennings, Sr., for whom he exercised the 1865 English Triple Crown winner Gladiateur.

Barbee moved to the United States in 1872 specifically to ride for John Chamberlain. He began his stateside career riding at Monmouth Park Racetrack.

== Racing career ==
In 1873 Barbee won the inaugural Preakness Stakes aboard Survivor who won by 10 lengths, a record until Smarty Jones 11½ length victory in 2004. He later won two other Preakness Stakes aboard Shirley (1876) and Jacobus (1883).

His record three Preakness victories was not surpassed until Eddie Arcaro won his fourth in 1951.

In addition to the Preakness victories, Barbee won the 1874 Belmont Stakes aboard Saxon, and the 1874 and 1875 Travers Stakes aboard Attila and D'Artagnan, respectively.

Tom Ochiltree was one of Barbee's most important mounts. He took the colt to victory in the Saratoga, Monmouth, Centennial, Westchester and Baltimore Cups. Other significant horses ridden by Barbee include Springbok, Duke of Magenta, Eole, and Uncas.

== Legacy ==
George Barbee was inducted in the Hall of Fame in 1996, chosen by the Hall of Fame's Historical Review Committee.

== Riding career at a glance ==
- Years Active: 1872–1884, in this country
- Number of Mounts: Approximately 500
- Number of Winners: 136
- Winning Percentage: 27
- Stakes Victories: 65
