= Australian (horse) =

British-bred Thoroughbred racehorse

- Sire: West Australian
- Grandsire: Melbourne
- Dam: Emilia
- Damsire: Young Emilius
- Sex: Stallion
- Foaled: 1858
- Died: 15 October 1879 (aged 20–21)
- Country: United Kingdom of Great Britain and Ireland
- Colour: Chestnut
- Breeder: William E. Duncombe
- Owner: Alexander Keene Richards; Robert A. Alexander
- Record: 8: 2-2-3

Major wins
- Doswell Stakes (1861); Produce Stakes (1861)

Australian (1858 – 15 October 1879) was a British-bred Thoroughbred racehorse and sire. He was exported to the United States where he had modest success as a racehorse but became a very successful and influential breeding stallion.

== Background ==
Australian was a chestnut horse with no white markings, standing 15.3 hands high in maturity bred in England by W. E. Duncombe. William Ernest Duncombe, later to become 1st Earl of Feversham was a member of a family which owned a long-established stud at Helmsley in Yorkshire. As a foal, he was acquired by Alexander Keene Richards of Scott County, Kentucky and was exported to the United States. The colt was initially given the name Millington.

He was from the third crop of foals sired by West Australian who won the 2000 Guineas, Epsom Derby, St Leger and the Ascot Gold Cup in 1853 and has been retrospectively recognised as the first Triple Crown winner. West Australian was regarded by contemporary experts as one of the best British horses of the nineteenth century. After his retirement from racing he had some success as a sire of winners in England and France and, through his son Solon was largely responsible for the survival of the Godolphin Arabian sire-line in Europe. Australian's dam Emilia, who was imported to the United States along with her son, became the female-line ancestor of many other major winners including Tanya, Ben Ali, Rhine Maiden and Broomspun. Her line continues to have an impact as her direct descendants include the influential broodmares Gaily, Hasili and Mariah's Storm.

== Racing career ==
=== 1861: three-year-old season ===
In April 1861 at New Orleans, racing under his original name, Millington, Australian made a successful racecourse debut when he defeated Regret, Tom Ready, Uncle True and Ninette to win the Doswell Stakes. In May and June he contested four races at Louisville Racecourse starting with a fifth-place finish behind the Lillie Ward in the Association Stakes and then coming home third behind the same filly in the Galt House Stakes. He subsequently ran second to Lillie Ward in another Association Stakes before finishing second to Kansas in the Citizen's Stakes. After a three-month break Millington returned at Lexington, Kentucky on 23 September for the Produce Stakes which, like many races at the time, was scheduled for a series of heats, with the prize going to the first horse to win twice. He won one of the first three heats, but in the final run-off he ran third behind John Morgan and Myrtle. Four days later at the same track he defeated John Morgan and Myrtle to win another Produce Stakes.

=== 1862: four-year-old season ===
Following the outbreak of the American Civil War Richards, who supported the Confederacy, moved to Louisiana and sold off many of his Kentucky-based stock including Millington who was bought by Robert A. Alexander of Woodford County and renamed Australian. In his only race for his new owner he contested an event in heats in which he finished fourth and fifth in the first two heats before running third behind John Morgan and Ella D. in the decider.

== Stud career ==
At the end of racing career Australian was retired to become a breeding stallion and spent most of his stud career at Alexander's Woodburn Stud. He sired the winners of 410 races and was runner-up to Lexington for the title of Leading sire in North America on six occasions between 1871 and 1877. His offspring included:

- Maudina, foaled 1864, dam of Cloverbrook.
- Abd El Kader, foaled 1865. Sire of Algerine.
- Maggie B B, foaled 1867, dam of Iroquois, Harold and Panique (Belmont Stakes) and the female-line ancestor of numerous major winners.
- Joe Daniels, foaled 1869, Belmont Stakes, Travers Stakes, Saratoga Cup
- Springbok, foaled 1870, Belmont Stakes, Saratoga Cup
- Attila, foaled 1871, Travers Stakes. Sire of Tecumseh.
- Letty, foaled 1873, dam of Refund.
- Baden-Baden, foaled 1874, Kentucky Derby, Jersey Derby, Travers Stakes
- Adele, foaled 1875, dam of Belmar.
- Spendthrift, foaled 1876, Belmont Stakes, Jersey Derby. His descendants have been instrumental in preserving the Godolphin Arabian sire line in modern times.
- Spirit, foaled 1876, dam of Paul Kauvar.

Australian died at the Woodburn Stud on October 15, 1879.

== Sire line tree ==
- Australian
  - Abd-El-Kader
    - Algerine
  - Helmbold
  - Joe Daniels
    - Hidalgo
    - Hoodlum
  - Fellowcraft
  - Springbok
    - Audrain
    - Vallera
  - Waverly
    - Strathmore
      - Plohn
    - Duke of Montrose
      - Montrose
      - Duke of the Highlands
        - Peter McCue
  - Attila
    - Tecumseh
  - Rutherford
  - Barricade
  - Baden-Baden
  - Spendthrift
    - Bankrupt
    - Kingston
      - Ildrim
      - Kings Courier
      - Hurst Park
        - Brousseau
      - Novelty
    - Lamplighter
      - Arsenal
      - Holscher
    - Assignee
    - Lazzarone
    - Hastings
      - Leonid
        - Lytle
      - Masterman
      - Glorifier
      - Don Enrique
      - Fair Play
        - Stromboli
        - Earlocker
        - Mad Hatter
        - Man o' War
        - Chatterton
        - My Play
        - Dunlin
        - Fairmount
        - Ladkin
        - Mad Play
        - Chance Play
        - Display
        - Chance Shot
        - Best Play
      - Flittergold

== Pedigree ==
Pedigree of Australian (GB), chestnut stallion, 1858
Sire West Australian (GB) 1850	Melbourne (GB); 1832	Humphrey Clinker	Comus
Sire West Australian (GB) 1850	Melbourne (GB); 1832	Humphrey Clinker	Clinkerina
Sire West Australian (GB) 1850	Melbourne (GB); 1832	Cervantes mare (1825)	Cervantes
Sire West Australian (GB) 1850	Melbourne (GB); 1832	Cervantes mare (1825)	Golumpus mare (1818)
Sire West Australian (GB) 1850	Mowerina (GB); 1843	Touchstone	Camel
Sire West Australian (GB) 1850	Mowerina (GB); 1843	Touchstone	Banter
Sire West Australian (GB) 1850	Mowerina (GB); 1843	Emma	Whisker*
Sire West Australian (GB) 1850	Mowerina (GB); 1843	Emma	Gibside Fairy
Dam Emilia (GB) 1840	Young Emilius (GB); 1833	Emilius	Orville
Dam Emilia (GB) 1840	Young Emilius (GB); 1833	Emilius	Emily
Dam Emilia (GB) 1840	Young Emilius (GB); 1833	Shoveler	Scud
Dam Emilia (GB) 1840	Young Emilius (GB); 1833	Shoveler	Goosander
Dam Emilia (GB) 1840	Persian (GB); 1829	Whisker*	Waxy
Dam Emilia (GB) 1840	Persian (GB); 1829	Whisker*	Penelope
Dam Emilia (GB) 1840	Persian (GB); 1829	Variety	Soothsayer
Dam Emilia (GB) 1840	Persian (GB); 1829	Variety	Sprite (Family: 11)

* Australian is inbred 4S × 3D to the stallion Whisker, meaning that he appears fourth generation on the sire side of his pedigree and third generation on the dam side of his pedigree.
