= Woodburn Stud =

Former American horse breeding farm

Coordinates: 38°08′24″N 84°44′24″W

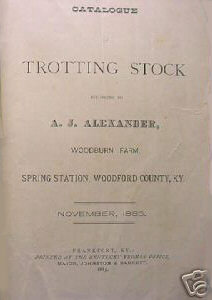
1885 Woodburn Farm sales catalogue

Woodburn Stud was an American horse breeding farm located in Woodford County, Kentucky about ten miles (16 km) from the city of Lexington. It was established in the 18th century as an original land grant property of General Hugh Mercer to whom it had been granted for his military services during the American Revolutionary War. Robert Alexander (1767–1841), a Scottish immigrant, came to Virginia from Scotland in 1786. Around 1790 he purchased the Mercer estate in Kentucky. Under the guidance of his son, Robert A. Alexander, during the 19th century, Woodburn Stud became the birthplace of Kentucky's Thoroughbred industry.

== History ==
Robert A. Alexander was the first to establish a systematic design method for horse breeding. Woodburn Stud was home to the stallion Lexington (1850–1875), America's leading sire for sixteen years. Lexington sired numerous champions and winners of major races including Duke of Magenta, Kentucky and Preakness, for whom the Preakness Stakes is named. Woodburn breeding yielded 18 winners of U.S. Triple Crown race winners and other major winners including Lexington's grandson Foxhall.

Some of the notable Thoroughbreds buried at Woodburn farm include Asteroid (1861–1886), Planet (c. 1855–1875), and Australian (1858–1879), a son of the 1853 English Triple Crown winner West Australian.

Although Lexington's success as a sire made Woodburn Stud near synonymous with flat racing Thoroughbreds, in fact during the mid- to late 19th century, Woodburn was where the Standardbred horse originated and the farm was best known for these trotting horses for harness racing.

After the death of Robert A. Alexander in December 1867, the operation prospered under his brother Alexander John "A.J." Alexander. But after A.J.'s death in 1902, it went into decline. Not long into the 20th century, the farm was no longer in the horse business and had been converted to cattle land.

In 1867 A.J. Alexander bred Preakness, who would be purchased by Milton H. Sanford and for whom the Preakness Stakes is named. The American Classic Race winners bred by the Alexanders' Woodburn Stud are:

- Kentucky Derby (4):
  - Baden-Baden (1877)
  - Fonso (1880)
  - Joe Cotton (1885)
  - Chant (1894)
- Preakness Stakes (4):
  - Tom Ochiltree (1875)
  - Shirley (1876)
  - Duke of Magenta (1878)
  - Grenada (1880)
- Belmont Stakes (10):
  - General Duke (1868)
  - Kingfisher (1870)
  - Harry Bassett (1871)
  - Joe Daniels (1872)
  - Springbok (1873)
  - Duke of Magenta (1878)
  - Spendthrift (1879)
  - Grenada (1880)
  - Burlington (1890)
  - Patron (1892)

== Airdrie Stud ==
Today the Woodburn name is long gone but the horse breeding business was revived in 1972 as Airdrie Stud Inc. which now operates on 2,500 acres (10 km^{2}), much of which is part of the original Woodburn Stud lands. Airdrie Stud, Inc. is owned by former Kentucky Governor Brereton Jones and his wife Libby. Mrs. Jones is a descendant of the Alexander family. In 2000, the Airdrie-bred filly Caressing won the Breeders' Cup Juvenile Fillies.

== Stallions at Airdrie Stud ==
As of 2026, Airdrie currently stands eleven stallions, including-

- Cairo Prince: From the first crop of his sire Pioneerof the Nile, Cairo Prince became the early favorite for the 2014 Kentucky Derby after his impressive wins in the Gr.II Nashua Stakes and Gr.III Holy Bull Stakes. His suffered an injury in his sophomore year, ending his career. He commands a stud fee of $15,000.
- Creative Cause: A standout son of Giant's Causeway, Creative Cause won several graded stakes races, including the Gr.I FrontRunner Stakes, Gr.II Best Pal Stakes, and Gr.II San Felipe Stakes, while also placing in the Gr.I Del Mar Futurity, Gr.I Breeders' Cup Juvenile, Gr.I Santa Anita Derby, Gr.II San Vicente Stakes, and Gr.I Preakness Stakes. He was also fifth in the 2012 Kentucky Derby and defeated every horse he ran against at least once. A full brother to graded stakes winner Destin, he commands a stud fee of $15,000.
- Include: A Gr.I winning son of Broad Brush and sire of multiple graded stakes winners, he commands a stud fee of $10,000.
- Istan: A globetrotting son of Gone West, Istan won two graded stakes races and several ungraded. He commands a stud fee of $5,000.
- Majesticperfection: A Gr.I winning son of Harlan's Holiday, he commands a stud fee of $15,000.
- Mark Valeski: A multiple graded stakes winner of Proud Citizen, his stud fee is private.
- Summer Front: A son of top sire War Front, he was an undefeated stakes winner as a juvenile and commands a stud fee of $10,000.
- Upstart: His sire Flatter's best juvenile son, he won the Funny Cide Stakes, Gr.II Holy Bull Stakes and Gr.III Razorback Handicap throughout his career. A millionaire, he commands a stud fee of $10,000.

== Bibliography ==
- Bundy, Diane; Howard, Jennifer (Autumn 2009). "The Alexander Family of Woodburn Farm, Woodford County, Kentucky" (PDF). Kentucky Ancestors: 4–14.
