= Harry Bassett =

19th-century American Thoroughbred racehorse

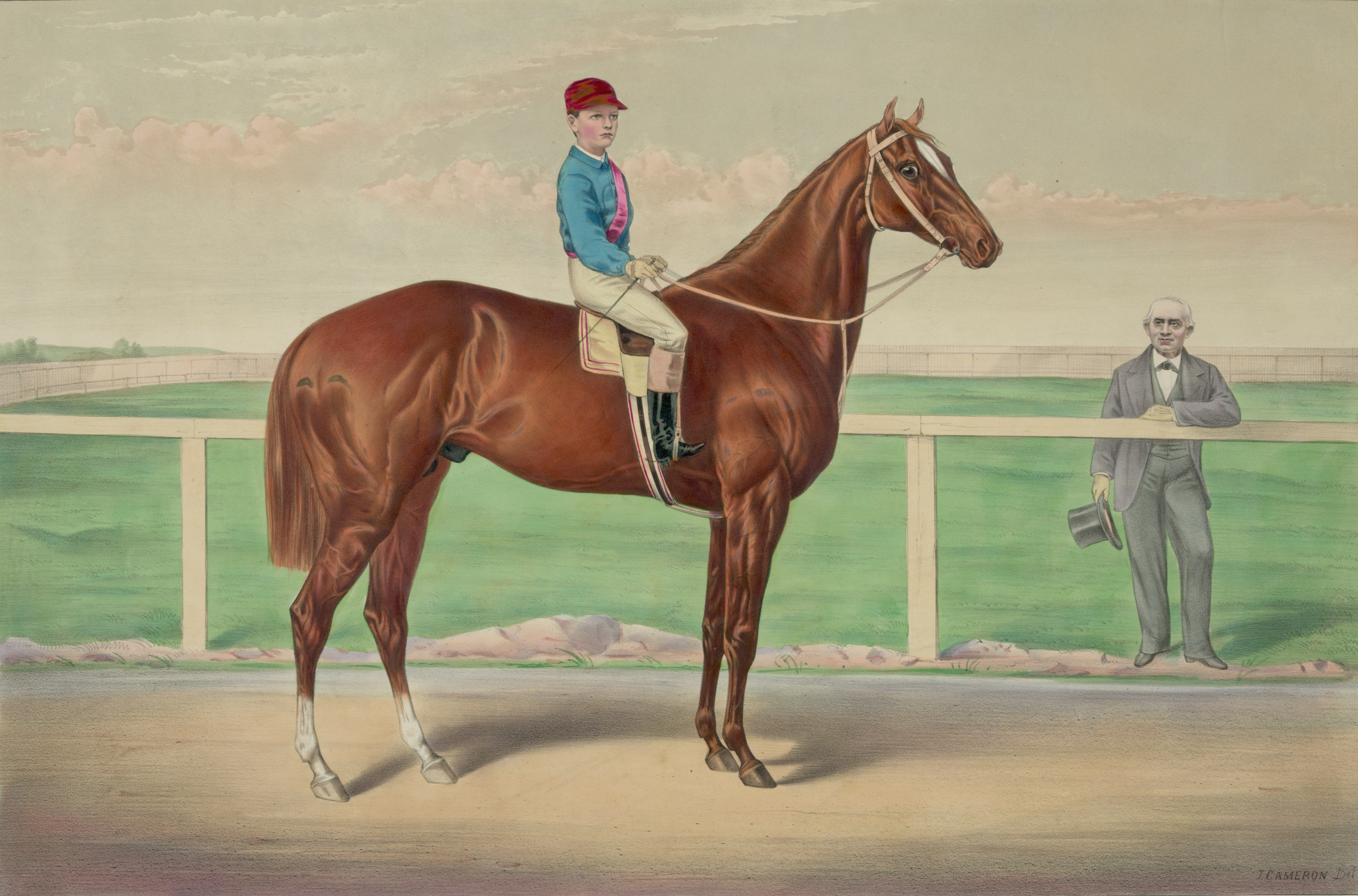
- Sire: Lexington
- Grandsire: Boston
- Dam: Canary Bird
- Damsire: Albion
- Sex: Stallion
- Foaled: 1868
- Country: United States
- Color: Chestnut
- Breeder: A. J. Alexander
- Owner: David McDaniel
- Trainer: David McDaniel
- Jockey: W. Miller
- Record: 36: 23-5-3
- Earnings: $55,920 (equivalent to $1,424,000 in 2025)

Major wins
- Nursery Stakes (1870); Renunion Stakes (1871); Travers Stakes (1871); Jerome Handicap (1871); Jersey Derby (1871); Kenner Stakes (1872); Saratoga Cup (1872); American Classics Race wins: Belmont Stakes (1871)

Awards
- American Champion Two-Year-Old Colt (1870); American Champion Three-Year-Old Colt (1871); American Champion Older Male Horse (1872)

Honors
- United States Racing Hall of Fame (2010)

Harry Bassett (1868–1878) was an American Thoroughbred racehorse, winner of the 1871 Belmont Stakes and an outstanding racehorse of the 19th century. He also won a number of other stakes races, and was named the Champion male of his age group in 1870, 1871 and 1872. He was retired to stud duties in New Jersey when his five-year racing career ended, having recorded 23 wins from 36 starts. Harry Bassett died in New Jersey in 1878 and was inducted into the United States Racing Hall of Fame in 2010.

== Breeding and early life ==
Harry Bassett was a chestnut stallion, foaled on 27 April 1868, that was sired by Lexington and out of the mare Canary Bird. Canary Bird was by the imported stallion Albion and out of the mare Panola, who was sired by the imported stallion Ainderby. Canary Bird's second dam, or maternal grandmother, was the imported mare Sweetbriar by Recovery. Harry Basset was bred either by R. A. Alexander or by A. J. Alexander, both of the Woodburn Stud of Woodburn, Kentucky, and was the second of Canary Bird's foals. He was sold at the 1869 S. D. Bruce yearling sale to trainer David McDaniel for $315 (equivalent to $7,600 in 2025).

== Racing career ==
Harry Bassett was trained by his owner David McDaniel; his jockey was W. Miller. As a two-year-old he won the 1870 Nursery Stakes at Jerome Park Racetrack, the Central Stakes, the Kentucky Stakes, and the Saratoga Stakes. He made a total of four starts as a two-year-old of which he won three, placing third in the other.

Harry Bassett won the fifth running of the Belmont Stakes in 1871 at Jerome Park Racetrack in a time of 2 minutes 56 seconds. He carried 110 pounds (50 kilograms) pounds in the race, and won $5,400 (equivalent to $145,000 in 2025) for his owner. The race was run on June 10 over a distance of 1 5/8 miles (13 furlongs/2,600 meters) on a fast track. Harry Bassett won by three lengths from the second-placed finisher Stockwood; the third place went to August Belmont's By The Sea. This was the first of three consecutive wins of the Belmont Stakes by David McDaniel as both owner and trainer, as he went on to win the 1872 race with Joe Daniels and the 1873 race with Springbok.

As a three-year-old, Harry Bassett also won the Jerome Handicap, the Travers Stakes, the Reunion Stakes, the Kenner Stakes, the Champion Stakes and the Jersey Derby. During his three-year-old year Harry Bassett started 11 times and won eight, finishing second in the remaining three. At four he increased his win record to 14, with wins in the Westchester Cup and a victory in a 2 miles (3,200 m) heat, before he was beaten in the Monmouth Cup by Longfellow. He then won the 2 1/4 mile Saratoga Cup, in which he defeated Longfellow. His jockey in that race was James Rowe Sr., who went on to become a leading trainer for James R. Keene. At age five, Harry Bassett started eight times, winning two, placing second in two, and third once. At six, he started four times, winning once and placing third once.

Harry Bassett's racing career spanned five years and ended with 23 wins from 36 starts; he finished second five times and third three times. His total earnings on the racetrack were $55,920 (equivalent to $1,424,000 in 2025). He was awarded the title of Champion Two-Year-Old Male in 1870, the title of Champion Three-Year-Old Male in 1871, and the Champion Older Horse title in 1872.

== Stud record ==
When his racing career ended Harry Bassett was retired to McDaniel's stud farm in Trenton, New Jersey, where he sired stakes winners such as Bowstring and Lettina out of the imported mare Letty by imported Australian. Lettina won the Young America Stakes (Nashville), the Jackson Stakes and the Ladies Stakes in 1881, when she was two years old.

Harry Bassett died on October 27, 1878, at McDaniel's farm in New Jersey. He was inducted into the United States' National Museum of Racing and Hall of Fame in 2010.

== Pedigree ==
Pedigree of Harry Bassett
Sire Lexington 1850	Boston 1833	Timoleon	Sir Archy
Sire Lexington 1850	Boston 1833	Timoleon	Saltram Mare
Sire Lexington 1850	Boston 1833	Sister to Tuckahoe	Balls Florizel
Sire Lexington 1850	Boston 1833	Sister to Tuckahoe	Alderman Mare
Sire Lexington 1850	Alice Carneal 1836	Sarpedeon	Emilius
Sire Lexington 1850	Alice Carneal 1836	Sarpedeon	Icaria
Sire Lexington 1850	Alice Carneal 1836	Rowena	Sumpter
Sire Lexington 1850	Alice Carneal 1836	Rowena	Lady Grey
Dam Canary Bird 1860	Albion 1837	Actaeon	Scud
Dam Canary Bird 1860	Albion 1837	Actaeon	Diana
Dam Canary Bird 1860	Albion 1837	Panthea	Comus
Dam Canary Bird 1860	Albion 1837	Panthea	Manuella
Dam Canary Bird 1860	Penola 1849	Ainderby	Velocipede
Dam Canary Bird 1860	Penola 1849	Ainderby	Kate
Dam Canary Bird 1860	Penola 1849	Sweetbriar	Recovery
Dam Canary Bird 1860	Penola 1849	Sweetbriar	Primrose
