= Joe Daniels (horse) =

19th-century American Thoroughbred racehorse

- Sire: Australian
- Grandsire: West Australian
- Dam: Dolly Carter
- Damsire: Glencoe
- Sex: Stallion
- Foaled: 1869
- Country: United States
- Color: Chestnut
- Breeder: A. J. Alexander
- Owner: David McDaniel
- Trainer: David McDaniel
- Jockey: James G. Rowe Sr.
- Record: 29 starts, 16 wins
- Earnings: $45,870 (equivalent to $1,305,000 in 2025)

Major wins
- Nursery Stakes (1871); Jerome Handicap (1872); Travers Stakes (1872); Kenner Stakes (1872); Saratoga Cup (1873) American Classics wins: Belmont Stakes (1872)

Joe Daniels (1869–1896) was an American Thoroughbred racehorse and stallion who won the sixth Belmont Stakes in 1872. Bred in Kentucky, Joe Daniels won two stakes races as a two-year-old and then the Belmont as a three-year-old when he also won a number of other stakes races, and some match races in California. As a four-year-old, he won one further stakes race before retiring with a record of 29 starts for 16 wins. He sired two stakes-winning horses during his breeding career.

== Early life ==
Joe Daniels was sired by the imported stallion Australian and out of the mare Dolly Carter. She was by the imported stallion Glencoe out of the mare Mavis, who was sired by Wagner. Joe Daniels was foaled in 1869 and was a chestnut stallion, bred by A. J. Alexander of Woodburn Stud in Kentucky. He was the second of three of Dolly Carter's stakes-winning horses. Sanford, an 1865 stallion, won the 1869 Fordham Handicap, and her 1875 filly won the 1877 Kentucky Stakes. Joe Daniels was one of 26 stakes-winning foals sired by Australian.

== Racing career ==
As a two-year-old, Joe Daniels won the 1871 Nursery Stakes at Jerome Park Racetrack in New York, and the Central Stakes. His time for the 1 mile (1,600 meters) Nursery while carrying 100 pounds (45 kilograms) was 1 minute 53 seconds. He defeated Alarm (second) and Woodbine (third) to win $2,750 (equivalent to $74,000 in 2025).

Joe Daniels won the sixth running of the Belmont Stakes in 1872 at Jerome Park Racetrack, carrying 110 pounds (50 kilograms), in 2 minutes 56.24 seconds, to win $4,500 (equivalent to $121,000 in 2025). The race was run on June 1 over a distance of 1 5/8 miles (i.e. 13 furlongs (2,600 meters)) on a fast track. He finished 1 3/4 lengths in front of Meteor, with Shylock third. His jockey, James Rowe Sr., later became a noted trainer. This was the second of three consecutive wins of the Belmont Stakes by David McDaniel as owner/trainer. He was successful in the 1871 event with Harry Bassett and later in 1873 with Springbok.

Also in 1872, Joe Daniels won the Jerome Handicap, Travers Stakes, Kenner Stakes and Annual Stakes. He carried 110 pounds (50 kg) in the 2 miles (3,200 m) Jerome which was for three-year-olds at Jerome Park. He defeated Mate (second) and Meteor (third) in a time of 3 minutes and 49 1/4 seconds for a prize of $4450 (equivalent to $120,000 in 2025). In the Kenner Stakes that year at Saratoga, New York, also over two miles for three-year-olds, Joe Daniels again carried 110 pounds (50 kg) to victory, in 3 minutes and 49 seconds. Second place went to Meteor and third to London. The race was worth $4,400 (equivalent to $118,000 in 2025) to the winner. He won the 1872 Travers from Silent Friend (second) and Wade Hampton (third), carrying 110 pounds (50 kg) again over 1 1/4 miles (2,000 m) in 3 minutes 8 1/4 seconds for a purse of $5,500 (equivalent to $148,000 in 2025).

During the later part of Joe Daniels' three-year-old year, he was sold to G. A. Johnson, who sent him west to California to race against Thad Stevens. On October 18, 1872, the two horses raced in a three-heat race, each heat run at the distance of 4 miles (6,400 m). Joe Daniels captured the first heat, but Thad Stevens triumphed in the second and third heats to win the race. The two horses met again on November 15, where there were four heats of 4 miles (6,400 m) each. Two other horses raced with Thad Stevens and Joe Daniels: True Blue and Mamie Hall. Joe Daniels won the first heat, came in second to True Blue in the second heat, second in the third heat to Thad Stevens, and again was second in the last heat to Thad Stevens. On Christmas Day, 1873, Joe Daniels beat Nell Flaherty in a match race held in San Francisco at a distance of 1 1/2 miles (2,400 m), winning in a time of 2 minutes, 46 seconds.

At four years of age, Joe Daniels won the 1873 Saratoga Cup. This was a race restricted to three-year-olds and older and run at Saratoga, New York. The distance was 2 1/2 miles (4,000 m) and he carried 108 pounds (49 kg) in his win. Coming in second was Harry Bassett, and third place went to True Blue. The winning time was 4 minutes 10 3/4 seconds. The victory netted Joe Daniel's owner $1,700 (equivalent to $46,000 in 2025). Over his racing career, he started a total of 29 races and won 16 of them, with total earnings of $45,870 (equivalent to $1,305,000 in 2025).

== Breeding career ==
During his breeding career, Joe Daniels sired two stakes-winning horses: Hidalgo and Hoodlum. Hidalgo was out of Electra, a daughter of American Eclipse. He was an 1882 colt and won the 1885 September Stakes, the 1886 Monmouth Handicap, and the 1887 Long Beach Handicap. Hoodlum was out of Miss Clay, a daughter of Hindoo. He was an 1888 colt and won the 1890 Champagne Stakes.

Joe Daniels died in November 1896 at Rancho del Paso in California.

== Pedigree ==
Pedigree of Joe Daniels
Sire Australian 1858	West Australian 1850	Melbourne	Humphrey Clinker
Sire Australian 1858	West Australian 1850	Melbourne	Cervantes Mare
Sire Australian 1858	West Australian 1850	Mowerina	Touchstone
Sire Australian 1858	West Australian 1850	Mowerina	Emma
Sire Australian 1858	Emilia 1840	Young Emilius	Emilius
Sire Australian 1858	Emilia 1840	Young Emilius	Shoveler
Sire Australian 1858	Emilia 1840	Persian	Whisker
Sire Australian 1858	Emilia 1840	Persian	Variety
Dam Dolly Carter 1854	Glencoe I 1831	Sultan	Selim
Dam Dolly Carter 1854	Glencoe I 1831	Sultan	Bacchante
Dam Dolly Carter 1854	Glencoe I 1831	Trampoline	Tramp
Dam Dolly Carter 1854	Glencoe I 1831	Trampoline	Web
Dam Dolly Carter 1854	Mavis 1843	Wagner	Sir Charles
Dam Dolly Carter 1854	Mavis 1843	Wagner	Maria West
Dam Dolly Carter 1854	Mavis 1843	Medoc Mare	Medoc
Dam Dolly Carter 1854	Mavis 1843	Medoc Mare	Whip Mare
