= Preakness (horse) =

American-bred Thoroughbred racehorse

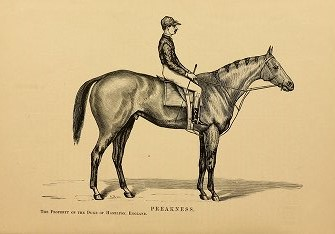
- Preakness
- Sire: Lexington
- Grandsire: Boston
- Dam: Bay Leaf
- Damsire: Yorkshire
- Sex: Stallion
- Foaled: 1867
- Country: United States
- Colour: Dark Bay
- Breeder: Robert A. Alexander
- Owner: Milton H. Sanford; Duke of Hamilton
- Trainer: William Hayward Sr. Charles Littlefield Sr. (1871)
- Record: 39: 18-12-2
- Earnings: $39,820

Major wins
- Dinner Party Stakes (1870); Maturity Stakes (1871); Westchester Cup (1871); Pimlico Stakes (1871); Grand National Handicap (1873); Jockey Club Handicap (1873); Long Branch Stakes (1873); Manhattan Handicap (1873); Jockey Club Stakes (1874); Baltimore Cup (1875); Saratoga Cup (1875)

Honors
- U.S. Racing Hall of Fame (2018); Preakness Stakes at Pimlico Race Course (2nd leg of the U.S. Triple Crown series)

Preakness (1867–1881) was an American Thoroughbred racehorse. He was sired by the famed leading sire Lexington out of a mare named Bay Leaf. Preakness was from Milton Holbrook Sanford's Preakness Stud in Preakness, Wayne Township, New Jersey.

== Racing career ==
Preakness upset the heavily favored colt, Foster, to win the inaugural running of the Dinner Party Stakes on October 25, 1870, the opening day of Pimlico Race Course in Baltimore, Maryland. He continued his racing career until age 9 with a record of 18-12-2 in 39 starts.

== Death ==
After his retirement from racing, Preakness was sold to stand at stud in England. He later became temperamental, as did his new owner, the Duke of Hamilton. After an altercation where Preakness refused to obey the Duke during a breeding session, he retrieved a gun and killed the colt, leading to a public outcry. As a result, there was a reform in the laws regarding the treatment of animals. Mr Sanford, the previous owner of Preakness, donated his trophy from the Dinner Party Stakes to the new race named in honour of the horse.

== Preakness Stakes ==
In honor of winning the first Dixie Stakes, a new stakes race was named in honor of Preakness: The Preakness Stakes.

In 2018, Preakness was inducted into the National Museum of Racing and Hall of Fame.

== Sire line tree ==
- Preakness
  - Fiddler
    - Jummy

== Pedigree ==
Pedigree of Preakness, dark bay colt, 1867
Sire Lexington	Boston	Timoleon	Sir Archy
Sire Lexington	Boston	Timoleon	Saltram mare
Sire Lexington	Boston	Sister to Tuckahoe	Balls Florizel
Sire Lexington	Boston	Sister to Tuckahoe	Alderman mare
Sire Lexington	Alice Carneal	Sarpedon	Emilius*
Sire Lexington	Alice Carneal	Sarpedon	Icaria
Sire Lexington	Alice Carneal	Rowena	Sumpter
Sire Lexington	Alice Carneal	Rowena	Lady Grey
Dam Bay Leaf	Yorkshire	St Nicholas	Emilius*
Dam Bay Leaf	Yorkshire	St Nicholas	Sea Mew
Dam Bay Leaf	Yorkshire	Miss Rose	Tramp
Dam Bay Leaf	Yorkshire	Miss Rose	Sancho mare
Dam Bay Leaf	Maria Black	Filho da Puta	Haphazard
Dam Bay Leaf	Maria Black	Filho da Puta	Mrs. Barnet
Dam Bay Leaf	Maria Black	Smolensko mare	Smolensko
Dam Bay Leaf	Maria Black	Smolensko mare	Sir Peter mare (family: 9)

* Preakness is inbred 4S x 4D to the stallion Emilius, meaning that he appears fourth generation on the sire side of his pedigree and fourth generation on the dam side of his pedigree.
