= George Mountain (jockey) =

Personal information
- Born: 1878
- Died: January 14, 1948 (aged 69–70) Los Angeles, California
- Resting place: Inglewood Park Cemetery, Inglewood, California
- Occupation: Jockey

Horse racing career
- Sport: Horse racing

Major racing wins
- Arverne Stakes (1907); Astoria Stakes (1907); Bedford Stakes (1907); Carter Handicap (1907); City Park Derby (1907); Corona Stakes (1907); Double Event Stakes (1907); Dunton Stakes (1907); Eclipse Stakes (1907); Flash Stakes (1907); Gaiety Stakes (1907); Hudson Stakes (1907); Lawrence Realization Stakes (1907); Old Hickory Handicap (1907); Montauk Stakes (1907); Parkway Handicap (1907); Queens County Handicap (1907); Standard Stakes (1907); Sterling Stakes (1907); Surf Stakes (1907); Tulane Stakes (1907); Undergraduate Stakes (1907); Clipsetta Stakes (1910); Fashion Stakes (1921) American Classics wins: Preakness Stakes (1907); Belmont Stakes (1907)

Racing awards
- Canadian National Champion Jockey by wins (1906)

Significant horses
- Colin, Don Enrique, Fair Play, Peter Pan, Stamina

George E. Mountain (1878 – January 14, 1948) was an American jockey in Thoroughbred racing who was one of the top jockeys in the country during the first decade of the 20th century as well as a National Champion in Canada.

== Racing career ==
In late 1906, a group of top jockeys from the north came to ride during the winter months at the racetracks in Louisiana. Among them was George Mountain along with Dave Nicol, Jimmy Lee, Joe Notter, Jack Martin, and Roscoe Troxler. With 118 wins in 1906, George Mountain ranked 10th in total wins in American racing.

In early January 1907, George Mountain was still competing in New Orleans and had already suffered a few minor injuries before he was badly hurt when his horse fell during a January 17 race at City Park Race Track. Missing nearly two months from racing contributed to Mountain not finishing among 1907's top ten winning jockeys. Nevertheless, he won 24 stakes races, the best of his career, and finished 1907 second for the year behind only Walter Miller.

George Mountain's wins in 1907 included the Preakness Stakes aboard Don Enrique and the ensuing Belmont Stakes with Peter Pan. Both races would become part of the U. S. Triple Crown series upon its creation in 1919.

During his career, George Mountain rode the great Colin including for his 1907 Belmont Stakes win. However, the most talked about was his June 5, 1907 win aboard Colin over Beaucoup in that year's Eclipse Stakes. The Daily Racing Form (DRF), a leading Thoroughbred racing publication, wrote that "In the Eclipse Stakes Colin showed one of the smartest performances ever seen in America." In an interview a few years later, George Mountain was quoted as saying Colin was "easily the greatest horse I ever rode." Mountain's belief in the horse would be fully recognized decades later when in 1956 Colin would be voted into the U.S. Racing Hall of Fame.

In addition to competing in the United States, Mountain would ride in Mexico and South America. Nearly twenty years after his best season, in April 1926 the nearly 48-year-old George Mountain was a leading jockey in Venezuela. It was in that country where he would ride for the last time in 1927 after which he retired to his home in Los Angeles, California where he died on January 14, 1948, at age 69.
