= Assignee (horse) =

American-bred Thoroughbred racehorse

- Sire: Spendthrift
- Grandsire: Australian
- Dam: Maid of Athol
- Damsire: Clanronald
- Sex: Stallion
- Foaled: 1891
- Country: United States
- Colour: Chestnut
- Breeder: R. T. Holloway
- Owner: James R. Keene; Foxhall P. Keene
- Trainer: William Lakeland

Major wins
- American Classics Wins; Preakness Stakes (1894)

Assignee (foaled 1891) was an American Thoroughbred racehorse. He won the 1894 Preakness Stakes.

== Pedigree ==
Pedigree of Assignee
Sire Spendthrift 1876	Australian 1858	West Australian	Melbourne
Sire Spendthrift 1876	Australian 1858	West Australian	Mowerina
Sire Spendthrift 1876	Australian 1858	Emilia	Young Emilius
Sire Spendthrift 1876	Australian 1858	Emilia	Persian
Sire Spendthrift 1876	Aerolite 1862	Lexington	Boston
Sire Spendthrift 1876	Aerolite 1862	Lexington	Alice Carneal
Sire Spendthrift 1876	Aerolite 1862	Florine	Glencoe I
Sire Spendthrift 1876	Aerolite 1862	Florine	Melody
Dam Maid of Athol 1880	Clanronald 1873	Blair Athol	Stockwell
Dam Maid of Athol 1880	Clanronald 1873	Blair Athol	Blink Bonny
Dam Maid of Athol 1880	Clanronald 1873	Isilia	Newminster
Dam Maid of Athol 1880	Clanronald 1873	Isilia	Isis
Dam Maid of Athol 1880	My Nannie O 1874	The Palmer	Beadsman
Dam Maid of Athol 1880	My Nannie O 1874	The Palmer	Madame Eglentine
Dam Maid of Athol 1880	My Nannie O 1874	Jenny Jones	Weatherbit
Dam Maid of Athol 1880	My Nannie O 1874	Jenny Jones	Mrs. Dodds
