= Don Enrique =

American-bred Thoroughbred racehorse

- Sire: Hastings
- Grandsire: Spendthrift
- Dam: Bella Donna
- Damsire: Hermit
- Sex: Gelding
- Foaled: 1904
- Country: United States
- Color: Bay
- Breeder: August Belmont Jr.
- Owner: August Belmont Jr. Patchogue Stable (William H. DuBois)
- Trainer: John Whalen; Frank M. Taylor
- Record: 226: 35-28-37
- Earnings: $27,663

Major wins
- Ravenswood Handicap (1907); Patchogue Stakes (1908) American Classics wins: Preakness Stakes (1907)

Don Enrique (foaled in 1904) was an American Thoroughbred racehorse best known for winning the 1907 Preakness Stakes. Owned and bred by August Belmont Jr., he was sired by Hastings and out of the mare Bella Donna, a daughter of Hermit.

== Early racing career ==
Don Enrique started his racing career as a two-year-old in June 1906 in a Maiden race in New York. In his third start he placed second to Salvidere in the six furlong Adirondack Handicap at Saratoga Race Course. During that same summer meet he placed third to Penarris in the six furlong Grand Union Hotel Stakes also at Saratoga. Later that fall he finished second in the six furlong Autumn Stakes at Sheepshead Bay Race Track in Sheepshead Bay, Brooklyn.

== Preakness Stakes ==
The thirty-second running of the Preakness Stakes was held on Tuesday, May 21, 1907. On that day Don Enrique went off as 15-1 longshot in the field of seven after three colts scratched. In the race, he broke poorly in fourth place under jockey George Mountain but as they reached Pimlico's famous "Clubhouse Turn" he had edged up into third place. The pace was moderate with the first quarter run in :24-1/5 seconds and the half in :48-4/5. As the race progressed, Don Enrique was part of a group of stalkers behind the leaders. He made his move on the final turn with some urging from George Mountain and rounded the field.

Near the top of the lane he passed most of the leaders and wore down front runner Ethon. In the last sixteenth of a mile he emerged in front and beat the second favorite and now runner-up by only one length. That day Ethon finished second at 3-1 way out in front over the favorite Zambesi by three lengths who finished third at 2-1.

The final time for the one mile and 70 yard race on dirt was 1:45-2/5 over a heavy track. Don Enrique won almost half of the total purse $5,000 netting earnings $2,260.

== Later racing career ==
Later in his three-year-old season Don Enrique won the six furlong Ravenswood Handicap at Jamaica Race Course. He also finished third in the mile and one eighth Saranac Handicap at Saratoga Race Course.

In his four-year-old season Don Enrique won the six furlong Patchogue Stakes at Gravesend Race Track on Coney Island, New York. He also finished second in the mile and one-eighth Brookdale Handicap also at Gravesend.

== Breeding ==
Pedigree of Don Enrique
Sire Hastings br. 1893	Spendthrift ch. 1876	Australian	West Australian
Sire Hastings br. 1893	Spendthrift ch. 1876	Australian	Emilia
Sire Hastings br. 1893	Spendthrift ch. 1876	Aerolite	Lexington
Sire Hastings br. 1893	Spendthrift ch. 1876	Aerolite	Florine
Sire Hastings br. 1893	Cinderella bay 1885	Tomahawk	King Tom
Sire Hastings br. 1893	Cinderella bay 1885	Tomahawk	Mincemeat
Sire Hastings br. 1893	Cinderella bay 1885	Manna	Brown Bred
Sire Hastings br. 1893	Cinderella bay 1885	Manna	Tartlet
Dam Bella Donna bay 1885	Hermit ch. 1864	Newminster	Touchstone
Dam Bella Donna bay 1885	Hermit ch. 1864	Newminster	Beeswing
Dam Bella Donna bay 1885	Hermit ch. 1864	Seclusion	Tadmor
Dam Bella Donna bay 1885	Hermit ch. 1864	Seclusion	Miss Sellen
Dam Bella Donna bay 1885	Bonnie Doon bay 1870	Rapid Rhone	Young Melbourne
Dam Bella Donna bay 1885	Bonnie Doon bay 1870	Rapid Rhone	Lanercost Mare
Dam Bella Donna bay 1885	Bonnie Doon bay 1870	Queen Mary	Gladiator
Dam Bella Donna bay 1885	Bonnie Doon bay 1870	Queen Mary	Plenipotentiary Mare
