= Springbok (horse) =

19th-century American Thoroughbred racehorse

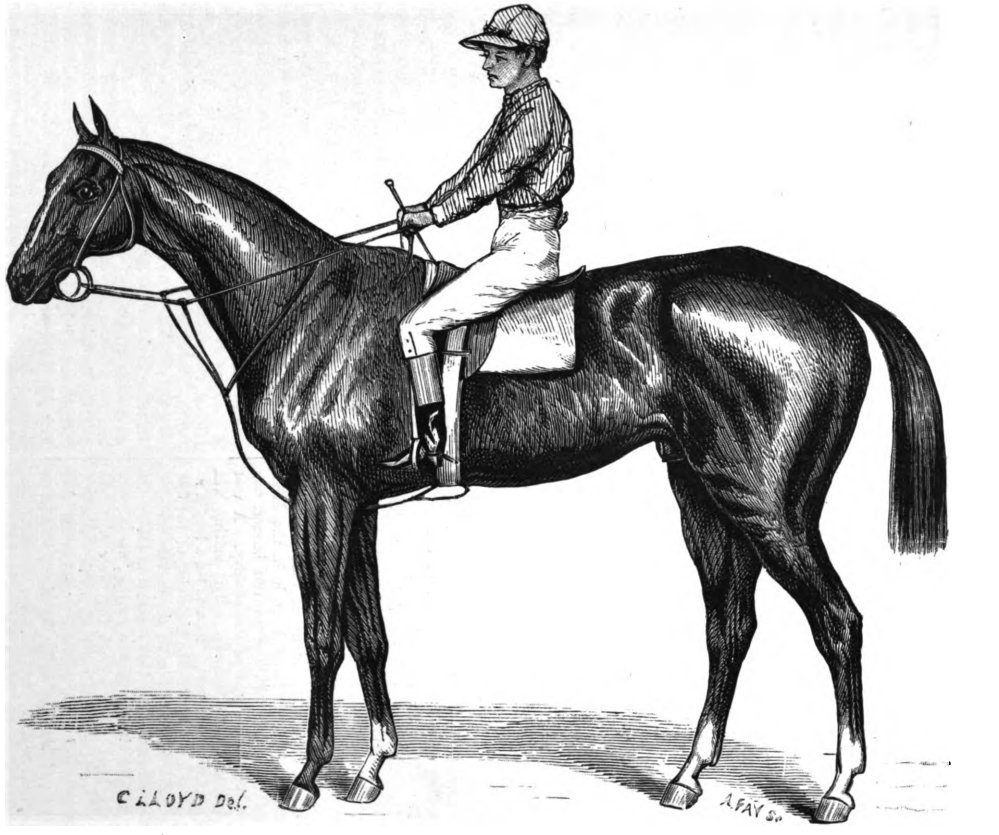
- 1877 etching by C. Lloyd.
- Sire: Australian
- Grandsire: West Australian
- Dam: Hester
- Damsire: Lexington
- Sex: Stallion
- Foaled: 1870
- Country: United States
- Color: Chestnut
- Breeder: A. J. Alexander
- Owner: Daniel Swigert; David McDaniel
- Trainer: David McDaniel
- Jockey: James G. Rowe Sr.
- Record: 25 starts, 17 wins
- Earnings: $20,020 (equivalent to $587,000 in 2025)

Major wins
- Saratoga Cup (1874, 1875); Citizen Stakes (1874) American Classics wins: Belmont Stakes (1873)

Awards
- American Champion Older Male Horse (1874); American Co-Champion Older Male Horse (1875)
- Last updated on 1 February 2011

Springbok (1870–1897) was an American Thoroughbred racehorse who won the seventh Belmont Stakes in 1873. Foaled in 1870, he was sired by the imported stallion Australian, his dam was a daughter of Lexington. During his racing career, he started 25 races, winning 17 of them. Besides the Belmont, Springbok won the Saratoga Cup twice, in 1874 and 1875 and was named Champion Older Male horse in 1874 and 1875. After retiring from the racetrack, he sired five stakes winners and died in 1897.

== Early life ==
Springbok was sired by the imported horse Australian and out of the mare Hester. Hester was by Lexington and out of a mare named Heads I Say by imported stallion Glencoe. Springbok was foaled in 1870, and was a chestnut stallion, bred by A. J. Alexander of Woodburn, Kentucky. Springbok was one of 26 stakes winning foals sired by Australian. Springbok was Hester's only stakes winning foal.

At two years of age, Springbok was owned and raced by Daniel Swigert, but was sold that year to David McDaniel for $2,000 (equivalent to $54,000 in 2025).

== Racing career ==
Springbok won the seventh running of the Belmont Stakes in 1873 at Jerome Park Racetrack. He carried 110 pounds (50 kilograms) in the race, which had a winning time of 3 minutes 1 1/4 seconds. He won $5,200 (equivalent to $140,000 in 2025) for his owner from the race. The race was run on June 7 over a distance of 1 5/8 miles (i.e. 13 furlongs (2,600 meters)) on a fast track. He won the race by four lengths from the second-placed finisher, Count D'Orsay, and the third place was Strachino. The winning jockey was James Rowe Sr., later to be a noted trainer. This was the third of three consecutive wins of the Belmont Stakes by David McDaniel as both owner and trainer, as he had already won the 1871 race with Harry Bassett and the 1872 race with Joe Daniels.

Besides the Belmont, Springbok won the 1874 and 1875 Saratoga Cup and the 1874 Citizens Stakes. During the 1870s, the Saratoga Cup was a 2 1/4 miles (3,600 m) race. In 1874, Springbok won the race while carrying 108 pounds (49 kg), beating Preakness who came in second, and Katie Pease, who placed third. The winning time was 4 minutes 11 3/4 seconds, with a value to the winner of $2,450 (equivalent to $70,000 in 2025). His 1875 Saratoga Cup win was a (DH) with the horse Preakness. In that race, Springbok carried 114 pounds (52 kg), and the winning time was 3 minutes 56 1/4 seconds. Grinstead secured third place. The win paid $2,250 (equivalent to $66,000 in 2025) to Springbok's owner.

Springbok's total race career was 25 starts with 17 wins for a total earnings of $20,020 (equivalent to $587,000 in 2025). He is considered to be the 1874 American Champion Older Male Horse, and also the Champion Older Male Horse for 1875, a title he shared with Preakness.

== Breeding career ==
In his breeding career, Springbok sired the stakes winners Audrain, East Lynne, Ethel, Huntress, and Vallera. Audrain, an 1881 stallion out of Alme by Planet, won the 1884 Latonia Derby, 1884 St. Louis Derby and the 1884 Hindoo Stakes. East Lynne was an 1882 mare out of Easter Planet by Planet. East Lynne won the 1885 Dixie Stakes and the 1885 Hunter Handicap. Ethel, an 1888 mare out of La Vena by Planet, won the 1890 Clipsetta Stakes and the 1891 Ashland Oaks. Huntress was an 1885 mare out of Edith by the imported stallion Saxon. Huntress won the 1887 Clipsetta Stakes, the 1888 St. Louis Oaks, and the 1889 Cincinnati Hotel Handicap. Vallera, an 1888 stallion out of Valasco by Pat Malloy, won the 1891 Tennessee Derby, 1891 Travers Stakes, and the 1891 Kenner Stakes.

Springbok died on March 19, 1897, at the Megibben-Edgewater farm in Kentucky.

== Pedigree ==
Pedigree of Springbok
| Sire Australian 1858 | West Australian 1850 | Melbourne | Humphrey Clinker |
| Sire Australian 1858 | West Australian 1850 | Melbourne | Cervantes Mare |
| Sire Australian 1858 | West Australian 1850 | Mowerina | Touchstone |
| Sire Australian 1858 | West Australian 1850 | Mowerina | Emma |
| Sire Australian 1858 | Emilia 1840 | Young Emilius | Emilius |
| Sire Australian 1858 | Emilia 1840 | Young Emilius | Shoveler |
| Sire Australian 1858 | Emilia 1840 | Persian | Whisker |
| Sire Australian 1858 | Emilia 1840 | Persian | Variety |
| Dam Hester 1866 | Lexington 1850 | Boston | Timoleon |
| Dam Hester 1866 | Lexington 1850 | Boston | Sister to Tuckahoe |
| Dam Hester 1866 | Lexington 1850 | Alice Carneal | Sarpedon |
| Dam Hester 1866 | Lexington 1850 | Alice Carneal | Rowena |
| Dam Hester 1866 | Heads I Say 1851 | Glencoe I | Sultan |
| Dam Hester 1866 | Heads I Say 1851 | Glencoe I | Trampoline |
| Dam Hester 1866 | Heads I Say 1851 | Heads or Tails | Lottery |
| Dam Hester 1866 | Heads I Say 1851 | Heads or Tails | Active |
