= William R. Travers =

American businessman

William Riggin Travers
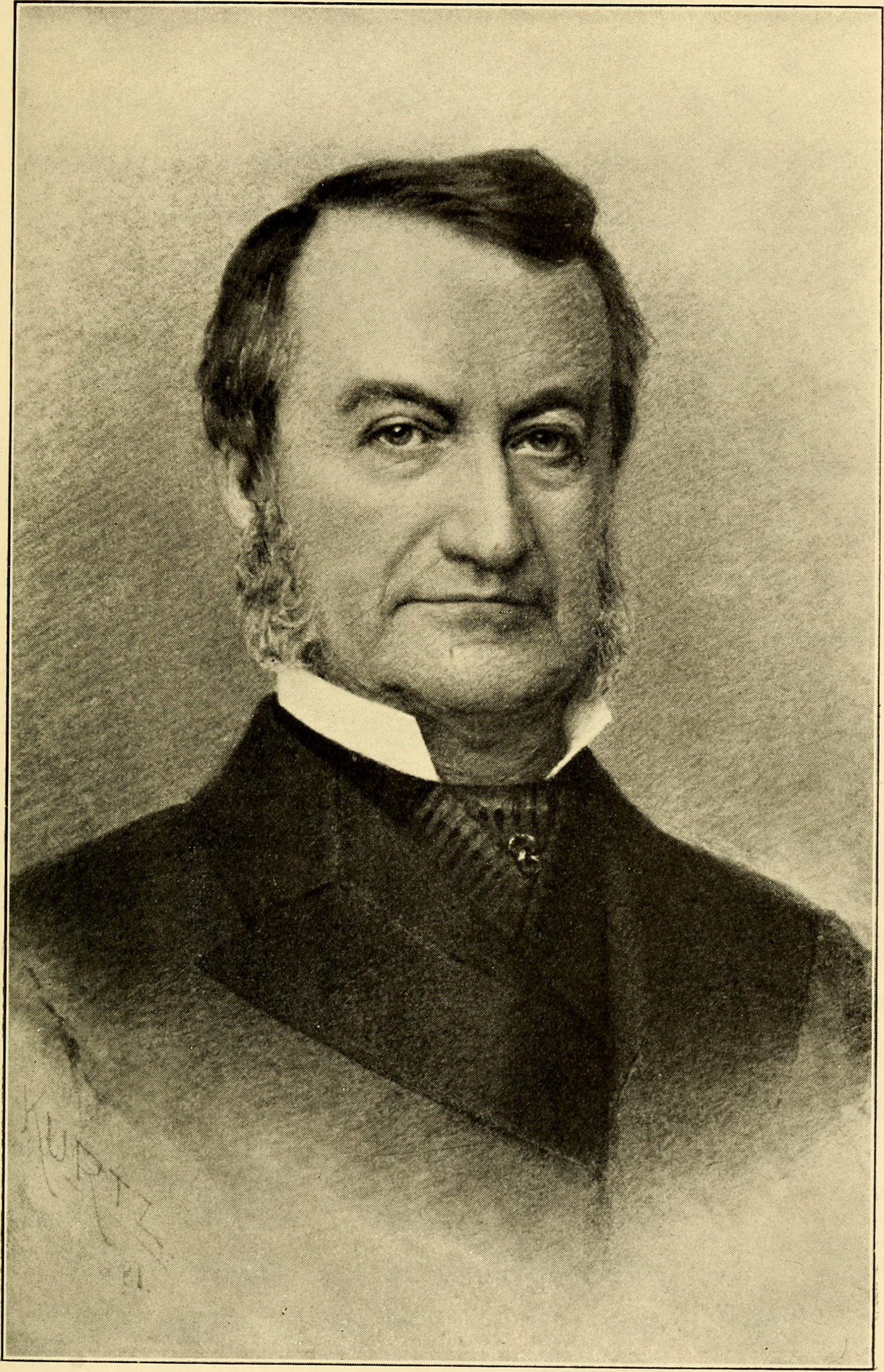
- Born: July 1819; Baltimore, Maryland
- Died: March 19, 1887 (aged 67); Hamilton, Bermuda
- Occupation: Lawyer
- Children: Three sons: William R. Travers, Jr. John Travers; Reverdy J. Travers; Six daughters: Mary Mackall Travers Hecksher; Maria Louisa Travers Wadsworth; Harriet Travers Fearing; Ellen T. Travers Duer; Matilda E. Travers Gay; Susan B. Travers

William Riggin Travers (July 1819 – March 19, 1887) was an American lawyer who was highly successful on Wall Street. A well-known cosmopolite, Travers was a member of 27 private clubs, according to Cleveland Amory in his book Who Killed Society?

== Early life ==
Travers was born in 1819 and graduated in 1838 from Columbia College, where he was a member of the Philolexian Society.

== Career ==
John Morrissey in 1863 enlisted Travers' help along with John Hunter to found Saratoga Race Course where Travers served as the first president. Saratoga's Travers Stakes is named in his honor and is the oldest major Thoroughbred horse race in the United States. In 1884, William Travers became one of the backers of the Sheepshead Bay Race Track on Coney Island.

Travers was a partner in Annieswood Stable with John Hunter and George Osgood. The operation had considerable success both in racing runners and with breeding at their Annieswood Stud farm in Westchester County, New York. Their horse, the Hall of Famer Kentucky won the first running of the Travers Stakes in 1864. One of their most famous horses was Alarm, considered one of the best sprint race horses in American Thoroughbred horse racing history.

Travers was a long-time president of the New York Athletic Club. On January 13, 1887, the club purchased Hogg Island in Long Island Sound and Pelham, New York, shoreline from the estate of John Hunter and renamed it Travers Island in his honor.

== Personal life ==
He married Maria Louisa Johnson (1827–1893), the fourth daughter of Reverdy Johnson (1796–1876). They had nine children, including:

- William R. Travers, Jr. (1861-1905), who married Laura Lillie Harriman (1870-1953), a daughter of Oliver Harriman in 1889.
- Reverdy J. Travers.
- Mary Mackall Travers (1847–1900), who married Henry Winthrop Gray (1839–1906) in 1865. They divorced and she remarried to John Gerard Heckscher (1837–1908).
- Maria Louisa Travers (1848–1931), who married U.S. Representative James Wolcott Wadsworth (1846–1926)
- Harriet Travers (d. 1931), who married George Richmond Fearing (1839–1920) Mother of George R. Fearing.
- Ellen T. Travers (1850–1902), who married William Alexander Duer (1848–1905), son of Willam Duer
- John Travers (1851–1888)
- Matilda E. Travers (d. 1943), who married Walter Gay (1856–1937), the painter, and moved to Paris, France, in 1876 where she remained until her death in 1943.
- Susan B. Travers

Travers died in Bermuda on March 19, 1887, from complications of diabetes. In his obituary, The New York Times wrote that he was "probably the most popular man in New York." He was known for having wit and a charming stutter.
