= Kenner Stakes =

- Class: Discontinued stakes
- Location: Saratoga Race Course; Saratoga Springs, New York, United States
- Inaugurated: 1870-1942
- Race type: Thoroughbred - Flat racing

Race information
- Distance: 1 3/16 miles (9.5 furlongs)
- Surface: Dirt
- Track: left-handed
- Qualification: Three-year-olds
- Weight: Assigned

The Kenner Stakes was an American Thoroughbred horse race run from 1870 through 1942 at Saratoga Race Course in Saratoga Springs, New York. Open to three-year-old horses, it was last contested at a distance of a mile and three sixteenths on dirt. It was run as the Miller Stakes from 1920 through 1930 in honor of prominent horseman and co-founder of Life magazine, Andrew Miller.

== Winners ==
(partial list)

- 1942 - Buckskin
- 1941 - War Relic
- 1940 - Your Chance
- 1939 - Hash
- 1938 - Bull Lea
- 1937 - Rex Flag
- 1936 - Granville
- 1935 - St. Bernard
- 1934 - Discovery
- 1933 - War Glory
- 1932 - Dark Secret
- 1931 - Mate
- 1930 - Whichone
- 1929 - Marine
- 1928 - Reigh Count
- 1927 - Brown Bud
- 1926 - Rock Star
- 1925 - Stirrup Cup
- 1924 - Klondyke
- 1923 - Martingale
- 1922 - Sweep By
- 1921 - Prudery
- 1920 - Man o' War
- 1919 - Milkmaid
- 1918 - Enfilade
- 1917 - Omar Khayyam
- 1903 - Injunction
- 1902 - Cunard
- 1901 - Baron Pepper
- 1897 - Don de Oro
- 1893 - Stowaway
- 1892 - Ronald
- 1891 - Vallera
- 1890 - English Lady
- 1889 - Long Dance
- 1888 - Los Angeles
- 1887 - Swarthmore
- 1886 - Elkwood
- 1885 - Irish Pat
- 1884 - Powhattan
- 1883 - George Kinney
- 1882 - Boatman
- 1881 - Hindoo
- 1880 - Luke Blackburn
- 1879 - Falsetto
- 1878 - Duke of Magenta
- 1877 - Bazil
- 1876 - Charley Howard
- 1875 - Ozark
- 1874 - Stampede
- 1873 - The Ill-Used
- 1872 - Joe Daniels
- 1871 - Harry Bassett
- 1870 - Enquirer
