= Tecumseh (horse) =

American Thoroughbred racehorse

- Sire: Attila
- Grandsire: Australian
- Dam: The Squaw
- Damsire: Leamington
- Sex: Stallion
- Foaled: 1882
- Country: United States
- Color: Bay
- Breeder: Harriet Brown
- Owner: Charles S. Littlefield
- Trainer: Charles S. Littlefield

Major wins
- Vernal Stakes (Pimlico) (1885) American Classics wins: Preakness Stakes (1885)

Tecumseh was an American Thoroughbred racehorse. He won the 1885 Preakness Stakes.
