= West Australian (horse) =

British-bred Thoroughbred racehorse

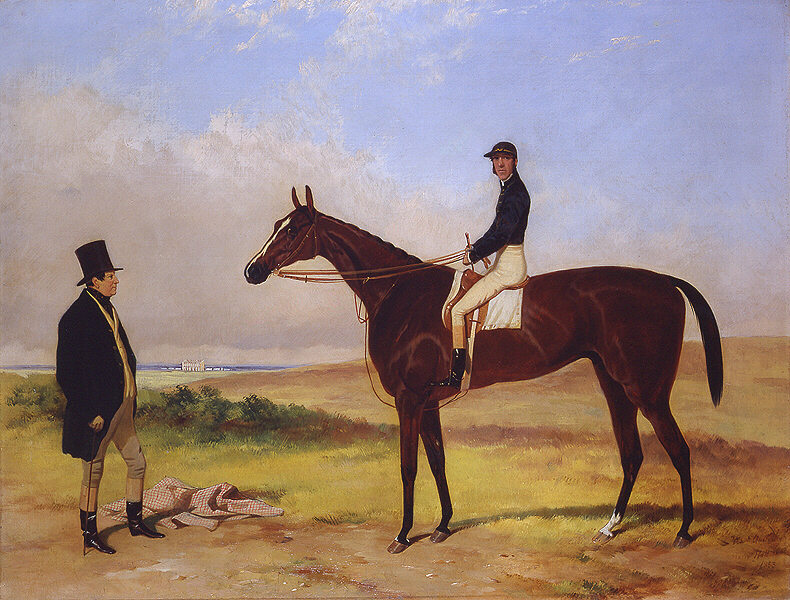
- 1853 painting by Harry Hall of West Australian with jockey up and trainer
- Sire: Melbourne
- Grandsire: Humphrey Clinker
- Dam: Mowerina
- Damsire: Touchstone
- Sex: Stallion
- Foaled: 1850
- Died: 1870 (aged 19–20)
- Country: United Kingdom of Great Britain and Ireland
- Colour: Bay
- Breeder: John Bowes of Streatlam Castle
- Owner: John Bowes; Albert Denison, 1st Baron Londesborough (age 4); Duc de Morny; Emperor Napoleon III
- Trainer: John Scott
- Record: 10: 9–1–0 (including 2 walkovers)
- Earnings: £13,640

Major wins
- 2,000 Guineas (1853); Epsom Derby (1853); St. Leger Stakes (1853); Grand Duke Michael Stakes (1853); Ascot Gold Cup (1854)

Honours
- 1st English Triple Crown Champion
- Last updated on 25 September 2010

West Australian (1850–1870) was a British Thoroughbred racehorse and sire. In a racing career which lasted from October 1852 until June 1854 he ran ten times and won nine races. After being beaten on his debut, he won all his remaining starts including the 2000 Guineas, The Derby the St Leger and the Ascot Gold Cup. He has been retrospectively recognised as the first Triple Crown winner. West Australian was regarded by contemporary experts as one of the best British horses of the nineteenth century. After his retirement from racing he had some success as a sire of winners in England and France and was largely responsible for the survival of the Godolphin Arabian sire-line.

== Background ==
West Australian was a "hard, yellow" bay horse standing 15.3 hands high with a narrow white blaze bred by John Bowes of Streatlam Castle, County Durham. He was described as having a "blood-like head... peculiar ears... good shoulders... clean-looking legs" and "plenty of bone". The New Sporting Magazine called him "one of the finest specimens of English racehorse ever seen". He was foaled in 1850, being by Melbourne the sire of seven classic winners. He was the second foal of his dam Mowerina, a daughter of Touchstone, who had finished second in the 1,000 Guineas Stakes and was a sister of the Derby winners Mundig and Cotherstone. Apart from West Australian Mowerina produced the winners Marley Hill (bl c 1851), Victoria (b f 1853), Go-Ahead Nassau Stakes, The Old Orange Girl (b f 1860 Kingston) thrice winner of the Bentinck Memorial Stakes, Baragah (ch c 1861 Stockwell) twice winner of the Bentinck Memorial Stakes and Ebor Handicap and Westwick (b c 1863 Stockwell).

Bowes sent West Australian into training with John Scott who trained forty classic winners at his base at Whitewall stables, Malton, North Yorkshire. He was ridden in most of his races by Frank Butler.

== Racing record ==
=== 1852: two-year-old season ===
West Australian was highly tried by Scott on the gallops at Malton before he appeared on a public course. In August 1852 he was pitted against the three-year-old Stewards' Cup winner Longbow in a trial race over six furlongs at weight-for-age terms and won easily by several lengths. Bowes was so impressed that he immediately took the express train to London where he backed his colt to win £30,000 in the following year's Derby.

The colt made his racecourse debut at the Newmarket Houghton meeting in late October when he started at odds of 5/2 and finished second to Speed-the-Plough in the Criterion Stakes. He was beaten by one length having been apparently unsuited by the slow early pace. Later in the same week he reversed the form with Speed-the-Plough when he started Evens favourite for the £700 Glasgow Stakes and won a more strongly run race by two lengths.

=== 1853: three-year-old season ===
In the 2,000 Guineas Stakes on 26 April West Australian started 4/6 favourite in a field of seven runners. The race was run in heavy rain and the second favourite, Orinoco took an early lead with the rest of the field closely grouped. Inside the last quarter mile West Australian moved into the lead with the Duke of Bedford's colt Sittingbourne emerging as his only challenger. The two pulled clear of the field before West Australian gained the advantage and won comfortably by half a length.

On 25 May West Australian started 6/4 favourite for The Derby against twenty-seven opponents, despite having "tender feet" which made him unsuited by the prevailing hard ground. West Australian was ridden as usual by Frank Butler, who insisted on being the last to leave the paddock– a superstition he had acquired after Daniel O'Rourke's win in the previous year. The race began with an even start, and the very early running was made by Cheddar and Cineas, before Umbriel took the lead, with Butler settling West Australian towards the middle of the field. Early in the straight Umbriel began to tire and the lead was taken first by Rattle and then Cineas, while Butler moved into contention on the favourite closely followed by Sittingbourne. In the final furlong West Australian and Sittingbourne pulled clear of the rest and after a "very exciting" race, the favourite prevailed by a neck. Rataplan finished strongly to take third ahead of Honeywood and Rattle. Bowes, who was winning the race for the fourth time, won a first prize of £5,425.

On 13 September at Doncaster, West Australian attempted to become the first horse to win the 2000 Guineas, the Derby and the St. Leger Stakes. Although these three races were recognised as the most important races of the season for three-year-old colts, the term Triple Crown was not used until some years later. The only previous attempt by a winner of the Guineas and Derby to win the Leger had been ten years earlier, when Cotherstone, also trained by John Scott, had started odds-on favourite but had been beaten a head by Nutwith. When Frank Butler was told that some had expressed doubts about the Derby winner staying the distance he replied that "he'll stay a thundering deal too long for any of them: the faster they go the sooner it will be over". The race attracted nine other runners, including Sittingbourne who was accompanied by his pacemaker Feversham, and West Australian was made the 6/4 favourite. Sittingbourne took the early lead as Feversham struggled to reach the front and Butler settled the favourite towards the back of the field. The Reiver and Rataplan moved past Sittingbourne on the turn into the straight, with West Australian moving steadily closer. Butler moved the favorite up to challenge The Reiver a furlong from the finish and West Australian went clear "without the slightest effort" to win by three lengths with the rest of the runners finishing at wide intervals. The Yorkshire-trained winner was received with "a perfect hurricane of cheers" by the local supporters.

Bowes was able to claim two further prizes in the autumn of 1853 without having to run his colt in a race. Three days after his St Leger win, West Australian was allowed to walk over for a £200 Sweepstakes over the same course and distance when his twelve opponents were all withdrawn by their owners. At Newmarket in October the Derby winner again walked over, this time for the £850 Grand Duke Michael Stakes.

West Australian ended the season as the leading English money-winner with earnings of £10,950.

=== 1854: four-year-old season ===
West Australian was scheduled to begin his four-year-old season with a match at Newmarket against Lord Glasgow's horse Barbatus, but Bowes was able to collect 250 guineas forfeit when Barbatus was withdrawn. West Australian was then sold for 5,000 guineas to Lord Londesborough.

At Royal Ascot in June West Australian beat Lord Eglington's horse Vanderdecken to win a Triennial Stakes. On the Thursday of the same meeting, West Australian ran in the Ascot Gold Cup in front of a crowd which included the Queen, Prince Albert and the Duke of Wellington. He won by a head from the five-year-old Kingston, with Rataplan third and was paraded past the Royal Stand after the race. At Goodwood on 25 July West Australian beat Mr Barber's horse Cobnut by twenty lengths to win a £300 Sweepstakes, but missed a race against the filly Virago in the Goodwood Cup.

== Assessment ==
In May 1886 The Sporting Times carried out a poll of one hundred racing experts to create a ranking of the best British racehorses of the 19th century. West Australian was ranked in the top ten by sixty-three of the contributors, placing him second to Gladiateur who received sixty-five votes. In a related poll, the electors were asked to choose the single greatest horse they had ever seen. In this poll, West Australian finished third behind Gladiateur and Isonomy. John Scott regarded him either the best horse he had trained or as the second best after Touchstone while Frank Butler believed him to be the best horse he had ridden.

== Stud record ==
West Australian was retired to stud for breeding purposes and stood at Kirkby, near Tadcaster, for a fee of 30 guineas, beside Stockwell. Here he sired The Oaks winner, Summerside and the 2,000 Thousand Guineas winner, The Wizard. In 1860 West Australian was sold for 4,000 guineas to Charles Auguste Louis Joseph, duc de Morny and sent to Haras de Viroflay in France. After Morny died in 1862, West Australian was moved to the French National Stud at Haras du Pin.

His best progeny included:

Foaled	Name	Sex	Major Wins/Achievements
1858	Australian	Stallion	Exported to the US. Sired Baden-Baden (1877 Kentucky Derby), Spendthrift
	Juene Premiere	Mare	Prix de Diane
	Ruy Blas	Stallion	Won 14 of 19 starts. Retired to stud in France. Sire of Destinee (Prix de Diane), Nubienne (Prix de Diane), Serpolette II (Prix de Diane)
1861	Solon	Stallion	Sired Barcaldine
	Summerside	Mare	Epsom Oaks
	The Wizard	Stallion	2000 Guineas Stakes

West Australian died on 2 May 1870 at Haras du Pin in France. A small stone memorial commemorating his victories was erected on the grounds of Bowes' Streatlam Castle.

== Sire line tree ==
- West Australian
  - The Wizard
  - Australian
    - Abd-El-Kader
      - Algerine
    - Helmbold
    - Joe Daniels
      - Hidalgo
      - Hoodlum
    - Fellowcraft
    - Springbok
      - Audrain
      - Vallera
    - Waverly
      - Strathmore
        - Plohn
      - Duke of Montrose
        - Montrose
        - Duke of the Highlands
    - Attila
      - Tecumseh
    - Rutherford
    - Barricade
    - Baden-Baden
    - Spendthrift
      - Bankrupt
      - Kingston
        - Ildrim
        - Kings Courier
        - Hurst Park
        - Novelty
      - Lamplighter
        - Arsenal
        - Holscher
      - Assignee
      - Lazzarone
      - Hastings
        - Leonid
        - Masterman
        - Glorifier
        - Don Enrique
        - Fair Play
        - Flittergold
  - Michael Scott
  - Solon
    - Controller
    - Arbitrator
      - Kilwarlin
        - Hebron
        - Kilcock
        - Ogden
        - Cherry Picker
        - Longford Lad
        - Kroonstad
    - Barcaldine
      - Winkfield
        - Winkfields Pride
        - Bachelors Button
      - Barmecide
      - Goodfellow
        - Chaleureux
      - Morion
      - Espoir
      - Wolfs Crag
        - Linacre
      - Dumbarton
      - Marco
        - Mark Time
        - Sansovino
        - Beppo
        - Marcovil
        - Moscato
        - Bronzino
        - Neil Gow
        - Varco
        - Ashore
        - Mark Minor
        - Omar Khayyam
        - Sprig
      - Sir Visto
      - The Rush
      - Prince Barcaldine
    - Whisper Low
  - Ruy Blas
    - Verdun
      - Boissy
    - Mourle
      - Fleurissant

== Pedigree ==
Pedigree of West Australian (GB), bay 1850
Sire Melbourne bay 1834	Humphrey Clinker bay 1822	Comus	Sorcerer
Sire Melbourne bay 1834	Humphrey Clinker bay 1822	Comus	Houghton Lass
Sire Melbourne bay 1834	Humphrey Clinker bay 1822	Clinkerina	Clinker
Sire Melbourne bay 1834	Humphrey Clinker bay 1822	Clinkerina	Pewett
Sire Melbourne bay 1834	Cervantes Mare bay 1825	Cervantes	Don Quixote
Sire Melbourne bay 1834	Cervantes Mare bay 1825	Cervantes	Evelina
Sire Melbourne bay 1834	Cervantes Mare bay 1825	Golumpus mare (1818)	Golumpus
Sire Melbourne bay 1834	Cervantes Mare bay 1825	Golumpus mare (1818)	Paynator mare (1810)
Dam Mowerina bay 1843	Touchstone bay 1831	Camel	Whalebone
Dam Mowerina bay 1843	Touchstone bay 1831	Camel	Selim mare (24) (1812)
Dam Mowerina bay 1843	Touchstone bay 1831	Banter	Master Henry
Dam Mowerina bay 1843	Touchstone bay 1831	Banter	Boadicea
Dam Mowerina bay 1843	Emma chestnut 1824	Whisker	Waxy
Dam Mowerina bay 1843	Emma chestnut 1824	Whisker	Penelope
Dam Mowerina bay 1843	Emma chestnut 1824	Gibside Fairy	Hermes
Dam Mowerina bay 1843	Emma chestnut 1824	Gibside Fairy	Vicissitude (family: 7-a)

== See also ==
- List of leading Thoroughbred racehorses
