= Duke of Magenta (horse) =

19th-century American Thoroughbred racehorse

- Sire: Lexington
- Grandsire: Boston
- Dam: Magenta
- Damsire: Yorkshire
- Sex: Stallion
- Foaled: 1875
- Country: United States
- Color: Bay
- Breeder: Woodburn Stud
- Owner: George L. Lorillard
- Trainer: R. Wyndham Walden
- Record: 19: 15–3–1
- Earnings: $45,412

Major wins
- Flash Stakes (1877); Nursery Stakes (1877); Dixie Stakes (1878); Kenner Stakes (1878); Withers Stakes (1878); Travers Stakes (1878); Jerome Handicap (1878) American Classics wins: Preakness Stakes (1878); Belmont Stakes (1878)

Honors
- American Co-Champion 2-Year-Old Colt (1877); U.S. Champion 3-year-Old Colt (1878); United States Racing Hall of Fame (2011)
- Last updated on June 4, 2011

Duke of Magenta (1875–1899) was one of the most successful racehorses in the United States in the 19th century.

== Background ==
Foaled in 1875 at the Woodburn Stud near Lexington, Kentucky, Duke of Magenta was owned by New York City tobacco tycoon George L. Lorillard and trained by Hall of Famer R. Wyndham Walden. Duke of Magenta was one of the last sons of the Thoroughbred sire Lexington.

== Racing career ==
In 1878, Duke of Magenta won the Preakness Stakes, the Withers Stakes, the Belmont Stakes, and the Travers Stakes, a feat accomplished since by only two other colts: Man o' War and Native Dancer. Excluding the Withers, he is also one of only seven horses to have won the Preakness, Belmont, and Travers.

In Duke of Magenta's day, the Derby was a recently established race not yet considered important by East Coast breeders. Duke of Magenta died on September 20, 1899, at the farm of J. McCloud in Brookline, Massachusetts.

== Honors ==
In 2011, Duke of Magenta was inducted into the National Museum of Racing and Hall of Fame.

== Sire line tree ==
- Duke of Magenta
  - Leo
  - Young Duke
  - Duke of Kent
  - Eric

== Pedigree ==
Pedigree of Duke of Magenta
Sire Lexington 1850	Boston 1833	Timoleon	Sir Archy
Sire Lexington 1850	Boston 1833	Timoleon	Saltram Mare
Sire Lexington 1850	Boston 1833	Sister to Tuckahoe	Balls Florizel
Sire Lexington 1850	Boston 1833	Sister to Tuckahoe	Alderman Mare
Sire Lexington 1850	Alice Carneal 1836	Sarpedeon	Emilius
Sire Lexington 1850	Alice Carneal 1836	Sarpedeon	Icaria
Sire Lexington 1850	Alice Carneal 1836	Rowena	Sumpter
Sire Lexington 1850	Alice Carneal 1836	Rowena	Lady Grey
Dam Magenta 1857	Yorkshire 1834	St. Nicholas	Emilius
Dam Magenta 1857	Yorkshire 1834	St. Nicholas	Sea Mew
Dam Magenta 1857	Yorkshire 1834	Miss Rose	Tramp
Dam Magenta 1857	Yorkshire 1834	Miss Rose	Sancho Mare
Dam Magenta 1857	Miriam 1851	Glencoe I	Sultan
Dam Magenta 1857	Miriam 1851	Glencoe I	Trampoline
Dam Magenta 1857	Miriam 1851	Minerva Anderson	Luzborough
Dam Magenta 1857	Miriam 1851	Minerva Anderson	Sir Charles Mare
