= Saratoga Cup =

- Class: Discontinued stakes
- Location: Saratoga Race Course; Saratoga Springs, New York, United States
- Inaugurated: 1865
- Race type: Thoroughbred – Flat racing

Race information
- Distance: 1 3/4 miles
- Surface: Dirt
- Track: left-handed
- Qualification: Three years and older

The Saratoga Cup was an American Thoroughbred horse race open to horses of either sex age three and older although geldings were not eligible from 1865 through 1918. Between 1865 and 1955 it was hosted by Saratoga Race Course, in Saratoga Springs, New York with the exception of 1943 through 1945 when wartime restrictions were in place and the race was held at Belmont Park in Elmont, New York.

The race was not run from 1887 to 1890, from 1892 to 1900, in 1908, 1911, 1912, from 1956 to 1962, and from 1964 to 1993. The 75 editions of the race were contested at four different distances:

- 1865–1886 : 2 1/4 miles
- 1891 : 2 miles
- 1901: 15/8 miles
- 1902–1955 : 1 3/4 miles

== "The seventy-sixth running Saratoga Cup" ==
In 1963, track owner/operator New York Racing Association held a one-time only commemorative event they called "The seventy-sixth running Saratoga Cup 'The Centennial Season Running.'" It was run at a distance of 1 5/8 miles and was won by Fitz Eugene Dixon, Jr.'s three-year-old gelding, Will I Rule.

== Historical notes ==
During his Hall of Fame career James E. "Sunny Jim" Fitzsimmons won numerous top races more than five times each including the Belmont Stakes. With ten wins, the Saratoga Cup was most and the race was also among his most memorable as the 1914 edition marked his first important major race win as a trainer.

Exterminator, the 1918 Kentucky Derby winner and a U. S. Racing Hall of Fame inductee, won this race four years in row from 1919 to 1922. In his 1920 win, Exterminator set a world record of 2:56 4/5 for 1 3/4 miles on dirt. Exterminator's owner Willis Sharpe Kilmer was a notoriously difficult employer and for each of the four wins, Exterminator had a different jockey and a different trainer.

In 1875 a very rare event in horse racing occurred when Preakness and Springbok together set a new American record for the 2 1/4 mile distance in winning the Saratoga Cup in a dead heat.

There were three walkovers in the 75-year history of the Saratoga Cup. Long-distance races were declining in popularity and by the 1920s the number of entrants was regularly only four or five horses. As such, the first walkover came in 1921 when Exterminator's dominance in racing scared away the competition. The second occurred in 1940 and was unique in that it involved two horses, Isolater and Fenelon. Both horses were owned by the powerful Belair Sud Stable who declared Isolater to win. The third time there was a walkover happened in 1946 with Ethel Jacob's Stymie. The future U. S. Racing Hall of Fame inductee had won the 1945 edition of the Saratoga Cup with ease in a year when it was held at Belmont Park. Stymie's continued dominance in racing saw his competition avoiding him in the race's return to Saratoga in 1946.

== The 1911–1912 statewide shutdown of horse racing ==
On June 11, 1908, the Republican controlled New York Legislature under Governor Charles Evans Hughes passed the Hart–Agnew anti-betting legislation. The owners of Saratoga Race Course, and other racing facilities in New York State, struggled to stay in business without income from betting. In spite of strong opposition by prominent owners such as August Belmont Jr. and Harry Payne Whitney, reform legislators were not happy when they learned that betting was still going on at racetracks between individuals and they had further restrictive legislation passed by the New York Legislature in 1910. The Agnew–Perkins Law, a series of four bills and recorded as the Executive Liability Act, made it possible for racetrack owners and members of its board of directors to be fined and imprisoned if anyone was found betting, even privately, anywhere on their premises. After a 1911 amendment to the law that would limit the liability of owners and directors was defeated in the Legislature, every racetrack in New York State shut down. As a result, the Saratoga Cup was not run in 1911 and 1912.

A February 21, 1913 ruling by the New York Supreme Court, Appellate Division saw horse racing return in 1913. However, it was too late for some racing facilities and financial difficulties meant that Brighton Beach Race Course, Gravesend Race Track and Sheepshead Bay Race Track never reopened.

== Records ==
Speed record:

- 1 3/4 miles – 2:55 flat : Reigh Count (1928)
- 2 1/4 miles – 3:56 1/4 : Preakness & Springbok (1875) Dead heat

Most wins:

- Exterminator (1919, 1920, 1921, 1922)

Most wins by a jockey:

- 3 – James Butwell (1909, 1915, 1917)
- 3 – James Stout (1936, 1939, 1940)

Most wins by a trainer:

- 10 – James E. Fitzsimmons (1914, 1929, 1930, 1934, 1936, 1939, 1940, 1951, 1952, 1954)

Most wins by an owner:

- 4 – David McDaniel (1872, 1873, 1874, 1875)
- 4 – Willis Sharpe Kilmer (1919, 1920, 1921, 1922)

== Winners ==
Year	Winner	Age	Jockey	Trainer	Owner	Dist. (Miles)	Time	Win$
1955	Chevation	4	Eric Guerin	Richard E. Handlen	Foxcatcher Farm	13/4	3:02.60	$10,525
1954	Great Captain	5	Eddie Arcaro	James E. Fitzsimmons	Ogden Phipps	13/4	3:02.60	$11,075
1953	Alerted	5	Conn McCreary	Ray De Stefano	Hampton Stable (Frank Stout)	13/4	3:01.40	$10,875
1952	Busanda	5	Ted Atkinson	James E. Fitzsimmons	Ogden Phipps	13/4	2:59.80	$11,325
1951	Busanda	4	Eric Guerin	James E. Fitzsimmons	Ogden Phipps	13/4	2:59.00	$10,950
1950	Cochise	4	Eddie Arcaro	Virgil W. Raines	Brandywine Stable (Donald P. Ross	13/4	2:57.60	$11,900
1949	Doubtless	5	Ted Atkinson	John M. Gaver Sr.	Greentree Stable	13/4	2:57.40	$11,650
1948	Snow Goose	4	Job Dean Jessop	Oscar White	Walter M. Jeffords Sr.	13/4	2:57.80	$11,000
1947	Talon	5	John Adams	Horatio Luro	Richard N. Ryan	13/4	2:58.40	$12,300
1946	Stymie	5	Basil James	Hirsch Jacobs	Ethel D. Jacobs	13/4	3:07.40	$5,975
1945	Stymie	4	Johnny Longden	Hirsch Jacobs	Ethel D. Jacobs	13/4	2:58.00	$18,700
1944	Bolingbroke	7	Robert Permane	Walter Burrows	Townsend B. Martin	13/4	2:57.60	$18,000
1943	Princequillo	3	Steve Brooks	Horatio Luro	Boone Hall Stable	13/4	2:56.60	$18,200
1942	Bolingbroke	5	Herb Lindberg	Walter Burrows	Townsend B. Martin	13/4	2:58.20	$9,550
1941	Dorimar	4	Conn McCreary	James W. Healy	Woodvale Farm (Royce G. Martin)	13/4	2:58.40	$9,850
1940	Isolater	7	James Stout	James E. Fitzsimmons	Belair Stud Stable	13/4	3:02.00	$4,825
1939	Isolater	6	James Stout	James E. Fitzsimmons	Belair Stud Stable	13/4	2:56.20	$6,400
1938	War Admiral	4	Maurice Peters	George H. Conway	Glen Riddle Farm	13/4	2:55.80	$6,600
1937	Count Arthur	5	Lester Balaski	Lon Johnson	Fannie Hertz	13/4	3:02.20	$6,425
1936	Granville	3	James Stout	James E. Fitzsimmons	William Woodward Sr.	13/4	3:00.80	$6,520
1935	Count Arthur	3	Wayne Wright	Frank S. Hackett	Fannie Hertz	13/4	2:58.40	$7,145
1934	Dark Secret	5	Charles Kurtsinger	James E. Fitzsimmons	Wheatley Stable	13/4	2:59.20	$5,525
1933	Equipoise	5	Raymond Workman	T. J. Healey	Cornelius Vanderbilt Whitney	13/4	3:00.00	$6,050
1932	War Hero	3	John Gilbert	George H. Conway	Glen Riddle Farm	13/4	2:59.20	$7,825
1931	Twenty Grand	3	Linus McAtee	James G. Rowe Jr.	Greentree Stable	13/4	3:01.20	$8,250
1930	Gallant Fox	3	Earl Sande	James E. Fitzsimmons	Belair Stud Stable	13/4	2:56.00	$9,275
1929	Diavolo	4	John Maiben	James E. Fitzsimmons	Wheatley Stable	13/4	2:58.00	$7,350
1928	Reigh Count	3	Chick Lang	Bert S. Michell	Fannie Hertz	13/4	2:55.00	$6,500
1927	Chance Play	4	John Maiben	John I. Smith	Log Cabin Stable	13/4	3:03.60	$6,850
1926	Espino	3	Laverne Fator	William J. Speirs	William Ziegler Jr.	13/4	3:00.40	$7,650
1925	Mad Play	4	Laverne Fator	Sam Hildreth	Rancocas Stable	13/4	2:59.40	$7,150
1924	Mr. Mutt	3	Harold Thurber	Alex Gordon	Bud Fisher	13/4	3:00.80	$8,300
1923	My Own	3	Earl Sande	William H. Brooks	Salubria Stable (Cary T. Grayson)	13/4	2:57.20	$6,850
1922	Exterminator	7	Albert Johnson	Eugene Wayland	Willis Sharpe Kilmer	13/4	3:00.40	$6,550
1921	Exterminator	6	Willie Kelsay	Willie Knapp	Willis Sharpe Kilmer	13/4	3:04.60	$4,500
1920	Exterminator	5	Charles Fairbrother	J. Simon Healy	Willis Sharpe Kilmer	13/4	2:56.80	$4,950
1919	Exterminator	4	Andy Schuttinger	Henry McDaniel	Willis Sharpe Kilmer	13/4	2:58.00	$5,350
1918	Johren	3	Frank Robinson	Albert Simons	Harry Payne Whitney	13/4	3:02.20	$5,250
1917	Omar Khayyam	3	James Butwell	Richard F. Carman Sr.	Wilfrid Viau	13/4	3:07.60	$5,050
1916	Friar Rock	3	John McTaggart	Sam Hildreth	August Belmont Jr.	13/4	3:03.00	$3,375
1915	Roamer	4	James Butwell	A. J. Goldsborough	Andrew Miller	13/4	3:01.80	$2,225
1914	Star Gaze	4	Joe McCahey	James E. Fitzsimmons	Herbert L. Pratt	13/4	3:10.00	$1,925
1913	Sam Jackson	5	Johnny Loftus	Jack L. McGinnis	V. M. McGinnis	13/4	3:08.40	$1,650
1912	No races held due to the Hart–Agnew Law.							
1911	No races held due to the Hart–Agnew Law.							
1910	Countless	3	Vincent Powers	John W. May	John G. Greener	13/4	2:58.60	$3,850
1909	Olambala	3	James Butwell	T. J. Healey	Montpelier Stable	13/4	2:58.00	$2,175
1908	Race not held							
1907	Running Water	4	Walter Miller	Thomas Welsh	Newcastle Stable	13/4	3:06.20	$6,050
1906	Go Between	5	Willie Shaw	William Shields	Edward R. Thomas	13/4	3:05.40	$6,050
1905	Caughnawaga	6	Arthur Redfern	Hubert H. Hyner	John Sanford	13/4	3:00.80	$5,800
1904	Beldame	3	Frank O'Neill	Fred Burlew	Newton Bennington (Lessee)	13/4	3:03.80	$8,100
1903	Africander	3	Grover Fuller	Richard O. Miller	Hampton Stable (Simon Deimel & Charles F. Dwyer)	13/4	2:58.00	$3,350
1902	Advance Guard	5	Patrick A. McCue	Alexander Shields	James Carruthers & Alexander Shields	13/4	3:01.80	$3,350
1901	Blues	3	Willie Shaw	Thomas Welsh	Frank J. Farrell	15/8	2:52.40	$3,350
1892	1900	Race not held						
1891	Los Angeles	6	Isaac E. Lewis	Albert Cooper	Santa Anita Stable	20/0	3:43.50	$2,900
1887	1990	Race not held						
1886	Volante	4	Isaac Burns Murphy	Albert Cooper	Santa Anita Stable	21/4	4:25.00	$1,700
1885	Bob Miles	4	William J. Fitzpatrick	Abraham Perry	James T. Williams	21/4	4:02.00	$2,150
1884	General Monroe	6	Harry Blaylock	Walter C. Rollins	Edward J. McElmeel	21/4	4:05.00	$1,650
1883	General Monroe	5	William J. Fitzpatrick	Walter C. Rollins	Edward J. McElmeel	21/4	4:21.50	$1,950
1882	Thora	4	Brophy		Charles Reed	21/4	4:05.50	$1,850
1881	Checkmate	6	Isaac Burns Murphy		James T. Williams	21/4	4:09.75	$1,800
1880	Long Taw	5	G. Wolfe	Green B. Morris	Green B. Morris	21/4	4:08.00	$1,300
1879	Bramble	4	Jim McLaughlin	James G. Rowe Sr.	Dwyer Brothers Stable	21/4	4:11.75	$1,500
1878	Parole	5	William Barrett	William Brown	Pierre Lorillard	21/4	4:08.50	$1,700
1877	Parole	4	William Barrett	William Brown	Pierre Lorillard	21/4	4:04.50	$2,150
1876	Tom Ochiltree	4	George Barbee	R. Wyndham Walden	George L. Lorillard	21/4	4:06.50	$1,850
1875 (DH)	Preakness; Springbok	6; 5	William Hayward Sr. W. Clark	Charles Littlefield Sr. David McDaniel	Milton H. Sanford; David McDaniel	21/4; 21/4	3:56.25; 3:56.25	$1,125 $1,125
1874	Springbok	4	George Barbee	David McDaniel	David McDaniel	21/4	4:11.75	$2,450
1873	Joe Daniels	4	Frank McCabe	David McDaniel	David McDaniel	21/4	4:10.75	$1,700
1872	Harry Bassett	4	James G. Rowe Sr.	David McDaniel	David McDaniel	21/4	3:59.00	$1,550
1871	Longfellow	4	Robert Swim	John Harper	John Harper	21/4	4:02.75	$1,550
1870	Helmbold	4	Robinson		W. R. Babcock	21/4	4:03.75	$1,850
1869	Bayonet	4	Miller		T. G. Moore	21/4	4:10.00	$2,250
1868	Lancaster	5	William Hayward Sr.		Milton H. Sanford	21/4	4:14.00	$1,950
1867	Muggins	4	Clark		Douglas & Co.	21/4	4:03.00	$1,850
1866	Kentucky	5	Charles Littlefield Sr.	A. Jackson Minor	Annieswood Stable (Belmont/Hunter/Jerome/Cameron/Travers)	21/4	4:04.00	$2,250
1865	Kentucky	4	Gilbert W. Patrick	A. Jackson Minor	John Hunter, William R. Travers, George Osgood	21/4	4:01.50	$1,850
