= Robert A. Alexander =

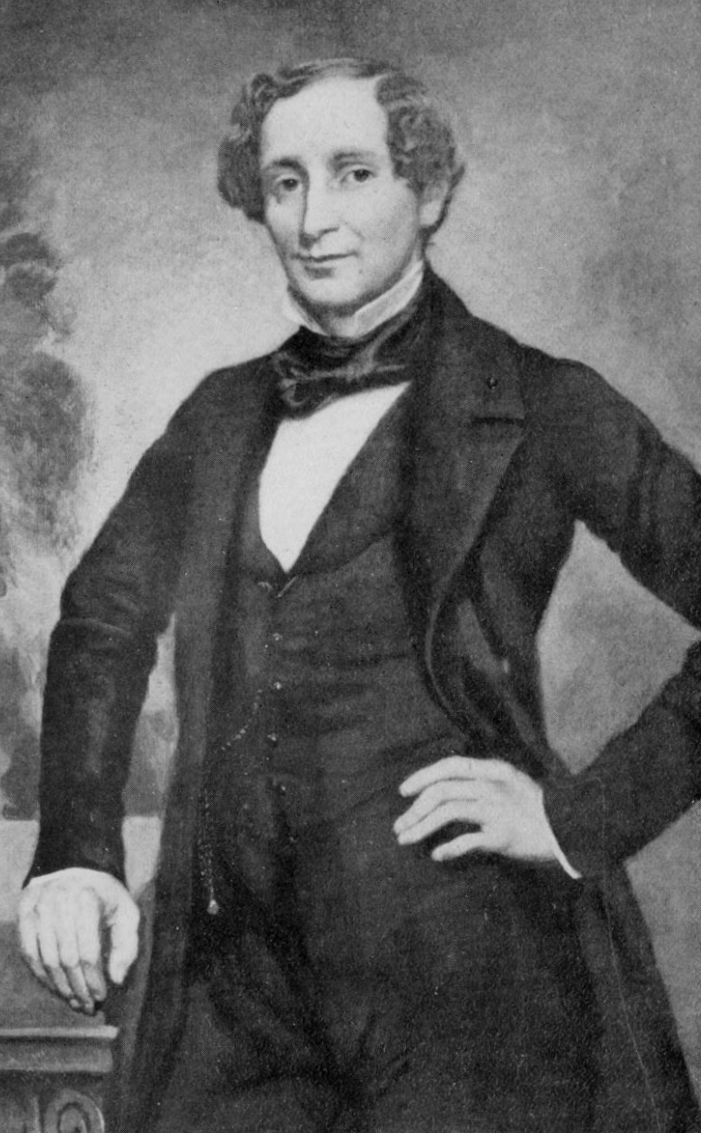
- Born: c. 1819; Midway, Kentucky, U.S.
- Died: December 3, 1867 (aged 47–48); Spring Station, Kentucky, U.S.
- Occupations: Businessman: Racehorse breeder

Robert Aitcheson Alexander aka Robert S. C. (Spreul Crawford) Aitcheson Alexander (c. 1819 – December 1, 1867) was an American breeder of Thoroughbred and Standardbred horses.

== Biography ==
Born on a farm near Midway, Woodford County, Kentucky, he and his siblings inherited the property on his father's death.

Alexander was sent to study in England, where he earned a degree at Trinity College, Cambridge. While there he became the beneficiary of the Scottish estate of Sir William Alexander, his uncle, at Airdrie and Cowdenhill. His mother Eliza died in 1840, his father Robert died in 1841, and his uncle Sir William died in 1842. This made R. A. the head of his family. In order to inherit the estate had to be a citizen of Great Britain, so he became one and changed his name to "Robert Spruel Crawford Aitcheson Alexander" (Spruel and Crawford being family names associated with the estates.) He lived on this estate for nine years, then in 1849 returned to Kentucky.

Back home, Alexander set about establishing a stud farm, and in the early 1850s returned to Europe to spend two years studying the techniques of breeding farms in Germany, France, and England. Starting with 921 acres (3.73 km^{2}) purchased from his family, Robert Alexander built his Woodburn Stud at Spring Station, Kentucky into the leading horse breeding operation in the United States. He also founded Airdrie, Kentucky in 1855 to mine for iron ore, a project he shortly abandoned and returned to his stud farm.

Alexander purchased two African-American enslaved people, Ansel Williamson and Edward D. Brown, who were taught the business of breeding and training horses. Both became horse trainers and had careers. After they were freed by the 13th Amendment to the U.S. Constitution, they remained as employees of Alexander until his death. Each went on to train Kentucky Derby winners and had outstanding careers that led to Brown's 1984 induction into the National Museum of Racing and Hall of Fame and Williamson's in 1998.

In February 1865, soldiers of the Confederate Army attacked the village of Midway. They burned down the railroad station, robbed its residents, and stole fifteen of Alexander's prized thoroughbred horses.

Alexander died on December 1, 1867. His brother, Alexander John Alexander (known as "A.J."), took over the management of Woodburn Stud and further enhanced its reputation.

Alexander is portrayed in the best selling novel Horse by Geraldine Brooks, published in 2022, which is based upon the life of the racehorse Lexington. A depiction of the Confederate attack is included in the book.

== Bibliography ==
- Bundy, Diane; Howard, Jennifer (Autumn 2009). "The Alexander Family of Woodburn Farm, Woodford County, Kentucky" (PDF). Kentucky Ancestors: 4–14. Archived from the original (PDF) on December 21, 2016.
