= Leading sire in North America =

The list below shows the leading sire of Thoroughbred racehorses in North America for each year since 1830. This is determined by the amount of prize money won by the sire's progeny during the year. It is restricted to stallions which are based in North America, but currently includes earnings from overseas races in Great Britain, Ireland, France, Italy, Germany and the United Arab Emirates as well as domestic earnings.

Prior to 2015, the Leading Sire Lists published by The Blood-Horse excluded earnings from Hong Kong and Japan due to the disparity in purses. Starting in 2015, earnings from Hong Kong and Japan are included on an adjusted basis.

The 2016 novel Mount! by Jilly Cooper describes the process to gain the fictional title for global leading sire.

== List ==
- 1830: Sir Charles (1)
- 1831: Sir Charles (2)
- 1832: Sir Charles (3)
- 1833: Sir Charles (4)
- 1834: Monsieur Tonson (1)
- 1835: Bertrand (1)
- 1836: Sir Charles (5)
- 1837: Leviathan (1)
- 1838: Leviathan (2)
- 1839: Leviathan (3)
- 1840: Medoc (1)
- 1841: Medoc (2)
- 1842: Priam (1)
- 1843: Leviathan (4)
- 1844: Priam (2)
- 1845: Priam (3)
- 1846: Priam (4)
- 1847: Glencoe (1)
- 1848: Leviathan (5) / Trustee (1)
- 1849: Glencoe (2)
- 1850: Glencoe (3)
- 1851: Boston (1)
- 1852: Boston (2)
- 1853: Boston (3)
- 1854: Glencoe (4)
- 1855: Glencoe (5)
- 1856: Glencoe (6)
- 1857: Glencoe (7)
- 1858: Glencoe (8)
- 1859: Albion (1)
- 1860: Revenue (1)
- 1861: Lexington (1)
- 1862: Lexington (2)
- 1863: Lexington (3)
- 1864: Lexington (4)
- 1865: Lexington (5)
- 1866: Lexington (6)
- 1867: Lexington (7)
- 1868: Lexington (8)
- 1869: Lexington (9)
- 1870: Lexington (10)
- 1871: Lexington (11)
- 1872: Lexington (12)
- 1873: Lexington (13)
- 1874: Lexington (14)
- 1875: Leamington (1)
- 1876: Lexington (15)
- 1877: Leamington (2)
- 1878: Lexington (16)
- 1879: Leamington (3)
- 1880: Bonnie Scotland (1)
- 1881: Leamington (4)
- 1882: Bonnie Scotland (2)
- 1883: Billet (1)
- 1884: Glenelg (1)
- 1885: Virgil (1)
- 1886: Glenelg (2)
- 1887: Glenelg (3)
- 1888: Glenelg (4)
- 1889: Rayon d'Or (1)
- 1890: St. Blaise (1)
- 1891: Longfellow (1)
- 1892: Iroquois (1)
- 1893: Himyar (1)
- 1894: Sir Modred (1)
- 1895: Hanover (1)
- 1896: Hanover (2)
- 1897: Hanover (3)
- 1898: Hanover (4)
- 1899: Albert (1)
- 1900: Kingston (1)
- 1901: Sir Dixon (1)
- 1902: Hastings (1)
- 1903: Ben Strome (1)
- 1904: Meddler (1)
- 1905: Hamburg (1)
- 1906: Meddler (2)
- 1907: Commando (1)
- 1908: Hastings (2)
- 1909: Ben Brush (1)
- 1910: Kingston (2)
- 1911: Star Shoot (1)
- 1912: Star Shoot (2)
- 1913: Broomstick (1)
- 1914: Broomstick (2)
- 1915: Broomstick (3)
- 1916: Star Shoot (3)
- 1917: Star Shoot (4)
- 1918: Sweep (1)
- 1919: Star Shoot (5)
- 1920: Fair Play (1)
- 1921: Celt (1)
- 1922: McGee (1)
- 1923: The Finn (1)
- 1924: Fair Play (2)
- 1925: Sweep (2)
- 1926: Man o' War (1)
- 1927: Fair Play (3)
- 1928: High Time (1)
- 1929: Chicle (1)
- 1930: Sir Gallahad III (1)
- 1931: St. Germans (1)
- 1932: Chatterton (1)
- 1933: Sir Gallahad III (2)
- 1934: Sir Gallahad III (3)
- 1935: Chance Play (1)
- 1936: Sickle (1)
- 1937: The Porter (1)
- 1938: Sickle (2)
- 1939: Challenger II (1)
- 1940: Sir Gallahad III (4)
- 1941: Blenheim (1)
- 1942: Equipoise (1)
- 1943: Bull Dog (1)
- 1944: Chance Play (2)
- 1945: War Admiral (1)
- 1946: Mahmoud (1)
- 1947: Bull Lea (1)
- 1948: Bull Lea (2)
- 1949: Bull Lea (3)
- 1950: Heliopolis (1)
- 1951: Count Fleet (1)
- 1952: Bull Lea (4)
- 1953: Bull Lea (5)
- 1954: Heliopolis (2)
- 1955: Nasrullah (1)
- 1956: Nasrullah (2)
- 1957: Princequillo (1)
- 1958: Princequillo (2)
- 1959: Nasrullah (3)
- 1960: Nasrullah (4)
- 1961: Ambiorix (1)
- 1962: Nasrullah (5)
- 1963: Bold Ruler (1)
- 1964: Bold Ruler (2)
- 1965: Bold Ruler (3)
- 1966: Bold Ruler (4)
- 1967: Bold Ruler (5)
- 1968: Bold Ruler (6)
- 1969: Bold Ruler (7)
- 1970: Hail to Reason (1)
- 1971: Northern Dancer (1)
- 1972: Round Table (1)
- 1973: Bold Ruler (8)
- 1974: T.V. Lark (1)
- 1975: What a Pleasure (1)
- 1976: What a Pleasure (2)
- 1977: Dr. Fager (1), Northern Dancer (2) (Note: The leading sire title for 1977 was given to Dr. Fager by the Thoroughbred Daily Times as at the time they counted North American earnings only. Northern Dancer was given the title by The Blood-Horse as they also included international earnings.)
- 1978: Exclusive Native (1)
- 1979: Exclusive Native (2)
- 1980: Raja Baba (1)
- 1981: Nodouble (1)
- 1982: His Majesty (1)
- 1983: Halo (1)
- 1984: Seattle Slew (1)
- 1985: Buckaroo (1)
- 1986: Lyphard (1)
- 1987: Mr. Prospector (1)
- 1988: Mr. Prospector (2)
- 1989: Halo (2)
- 1990: Alydar (1)
- 1991: Danzig (1)
- 1992: Danzig (2)
- 1993: Danzig (3)
- 1994: Broad Brush (1)
- 1995: Palace Music (1)
- 1996: Cozzene (1)
- 1997: Deputy Minister (1)
- 1998: Deputy Minister (2)
- 1999: Storm Cat (1)
- 2000: Storm Cat (2)
- 2001: Thunder Gulch (1)
- 2002: El Prado (1)
- 2003: A.P. Indy (1)
- 2004: Elusive Quality (1)
- 2005: Saint Ballado (1)
- 2006: A.P. Indy (2)
- 2007: Smart Strike (1)
- 2008: Smart Strike (2)
- 2009: Giant's Causeway (1)
- 2010: Giant's Causeway (2)
- 2011: Distorted Humor (1)
- 2012: Giant's Causeway (3)
- 2013: Kitten's Joy (1)
- 2014: Tapit (1)
- 2015: Tapit (2)
- 2016: Tapit (3)
- 2017: Unbridled's Song (1)
- 2018: Kitten's Joy (2)
- 2019: Into Mischief (1)
- 2020: Into Mischief (2)
- 2021: Into Mischief (3)
- 2022: Into Mischief (4)
- 2023: Into Mischief (5)
- 2024: Into Mischief (6)
- 2025: Into Mischief (7)

Sire lines and selected dam lines of the leading sires, color-coded by sire line

Darley Arabian	Godolphin Arabian	Byerley Turk
Bartlett's Childers
Squirt	Blank	Cade	Jigg
Marske	Matchem	Partner
Eclipse	Conductor	Tartar
Pot-8-Os	King Fergus	Mercury	Trumpator	Herod
Waxy	Hambletonian	Beningbrough	Gohanna	Pacolet	Sorcerer	Florizel	Woodpecker
Whalebone	Whitelock	Scud	Orville	Golumpus	Citizen	Comus	Diomed	Buzzard
Waverley	Sir Hercules	Camel	Blacklock	Actaeon	Muley	Emilius	Catton	Jackson's Pacolet	Humphrey Clinker	Sir Archy	Duroc	Selim	Castrel
Don John	Faugh-a-Ballagh	Birdcatcher	Albion; 1859	Leviathan; 1837, 1838; 1839, 1843; 1848 (tie)	Priam; 1842, 1844; 1845, 1846	Trustee; 1848 (tie)	Monsieur Tonson; 1834	Sir Charles; 1830, 1831; 1832, 1833; 1836	Bertrand; 1835	Timoleon	American Eclipse	Pantaloon
Iago	Leamington; 1875, 1877; 1879, 1881	Oxford	The Baron	Touchstone	Voltaire	Revenue; 1860	Medoc; 1840, 1841	Sultan	The Libel
Iroquois; 1892	Longfellow; 1891	Sterling	Stockwell	Rataplan	Orlando	Newminster	Ithuriel	Voltigeur	Vedette	Melbourne	Boston; 1851, 1852; 1853	Glencoe I 1847, 1849; 1850, 1854; 1855, 1856; 1857, 1858	Bay Middleton	Traducer
Bonnie Scotland; 1880, 1882	Isonomy	Doncaster	Citadel	Blinkhooley	Eclipse (II)	Trumpeter	Marsyas	Hermit	Lord Clifden	Longbow	Billet; 1883	Speculum	West Australian	Lexington; 1861, 1862; 1863, 1864; 1865, 1866; 1867, 1868; 1869, 1870; 1871, 1872; 1873, 1874; 1876, 1878	Vandal	The Flying Dutchman	Sir Modred; 1894
Bramble	Isinglass	Bend Or	Glenelg; 1884, 1886; 1887, 1888	Wisdom	Alarm	Plutus	Albert Victor	St. Blaise; 1890	Hampton	Sir Dixon; 1901	Rosebery	Solon	Australian	Aerolite	Florence	Virgil; 1885	Dollar
Ben Brush; 1909	Star Shoot; 1911, 1912; 1916, 1917; 1919	Ben Strome; 1903	Ormonde	Bona Vista	Blair Athol	Sir Hugo	Himyar; 1893	Flageolet	Albert; 1899	Bay Ronald	Toxophilite	Amphion	Arbitrator	Galopin	Spendthrift	Hindoo	Androcles
Broomstick; 1913, 1914; 1915	Sweep; 1918, 1925	John O'Gaunt	Orme	Cyllene	The Rover	McGee; 1922	Domino	Plaudit	Rayon d'Or; 1889	Bayardo	Musket	Sundridge	Kilwarlin	St. Simon	Hastings; 1902, 1908	Kingston; 1900, 1910	Hanover; 1895, 1896; 1897, 1898	Cambyse
The Porter; 1937	Swynford	Flying Fox	Polymelus	St. Gatien	Commando; 1907	King James	Gainsborough	Carbine	Sunreigh	Ogden	Persimmon	Rabelais	Fair Play; 1920, 1924; 1927	Hamburg; 1905	Gardefeu
Blandford	Challenger; 1939	Ajax	Phalaris	Meddler; 1904, 1906	Celt; 1921	Ultimus	Peter Pan	Colin	Spearmint	Reigh Count	The Finn; 1923	Prince Palatine	Man o' War; 1926	Chance Play; 1935, 1944	Chouberski
Blenheim; 1941	Teddy	Sickle; 1936, 1938	Pharos	Pharamond	High Time; 1928	Pennant	Neddie	Hyperion	Chicle; 1929	Count Fleet; 1951	Rose Prince	War Admiral; 1945	Bruleur
Mahmoud; 1946	Bull Dog; 1943	Sir Gallahad; 1930, 1933; 1934, 1940	Unbreakable	Nearco	Menow	Equipoise; 1942	Good Goods	Spur	Heliopolis; 1950, 1954	Stardust	Prince Rose	Havresac	Ksar
Bull Lea; 1947, 1948; 1949, 1952; 1953	Polynesian	Tom Fool	Sting	Alsab	Star Kingdom	Princequillo; 1957, 1958	Cavaliere d'Arpino	Tourbillon
Native Dancer	Nasrullah; 1955, 1956; 1959, 1960; 1962	Royal Charger	Buckpasser	Questionnaire	Armageddon	Noholme	Round Table; 1972	Bellini	Ambiorix; 1961
Raise a Native	Natalma	Nearctic	Bold Ruler; 1963, 1964; 1965, 1966; 1967, 1968; 1969, 1973	Grey Sovereign	Indian Hemp	Turn-To	Buckaroo; 1985	Free For All	Battle Joined	Nodouble; 1981	Tenerani
Mr. Prospector; 1987, 1980	Alydar; 1990	Exclusive Native; 1978, 1979	Northern Dancer; 1971, 1977	Raja Baba; 1980	What a Pleasure; 1975, 1976	Boldnesian	T.V. Lark; 1974	Hail To Reason; 1970	Rough'n Tumble	Ack Ack	Ribot
Gulch	The Minstrel	Storm Bird	Lyphard; 1986	Danzig; 1991, 1992; 1993	Vice Regent	Bold Reasoning	Fortino	Halo; 1983, 1989	Dr. Fager; 1977	His Majesty; 1982
Thunder Gulch; 2001	Palace Music; 1995	Storm Cat; 1999, 2000	Sadler's Wells	Deputy Minister; 1997, 1998	Seattle Slew; 1984	Caro	Broad Brush; 1994
Smart Strike; 2007, 2008	Gone West	Forty Niner	Giant's Causeway; 2009, 2010; 2012	El Prado; 2002	Harlan	A.P. Indy; 2003, 2006	Cozzene; 1996	Saint Ballado; 2005
Fappiano	Elusive Quality; 2004	Distorted Humor; 2011	Kitten's Joy; 2013, 2018	Harlan's Holiday	Pulpit
Unbridled	Into Mischief; 2019, 2020, 2021, 2022, 2023, 2024, 2025.	Tapit; 2014, 2015; 2016
Unbridled's Song; 2017

== See also ==
- Leading sire in Australia
- Leading sire in France
- Leading sire in Germany
- Leading sire in Great Britain & Ireland
- Leading sire in Japan
- Leading broodmare sire in Japan
- Leading broodmare sire in Great Britain & Ireland
- Leading broodmare sire in North America

== Sources ==
- bloodhorse.com
- tbheritage.com
