= Culpepper (horse) =

American Thoroughbred racehorse

- Sire: Revolver
- Grandsire: Revenue
- Dam: Gentle Annie
- Damsire: Kinggold
- Sex: Stallion
- Foaled: 1871
- Country: United States
- Colour: Bay
- Breeder: D. J. Crouse
- Owner: Hugh Gaffney
- Trainer: Hugh Gaffney

Major wins
- Triple Crown wins: Preakness Stakes (1874)

Culpepper was an American Thoroughbred racehorse. He won the 1874 Preakness Stakes.

== Background ==
Culpepper was bred by D. J. Crouse in the state of Ohio. His sire was Revolver, and his dam was Gentle Annie.

== Racing career ==
As a two-year-old, Culpepper ran in the July Stakes, coming in third. At some point after the two-old-season, Culpepper was sold to trainer Hugh Gaffney. As a three-year-old, he ran in the Preakness Stakes, ridden by William Donohue. The favorite to win the race was Saxon, a British-bred horse who would go on to win that year's Belmont Stakes. He ended up coming in last in the Preakness, and Culpepper won the race.

Culpepper's success was not replicated in the Withers Stakes, in which he came 13th. He then came fifth in the Sequel Stakes. His performance started to pick up again when he came second in the Summer Handicap, won a sweepstakes at Prospect Park in Buffalo, New York on August 18, came second in another sweepstakes on September 9, came second in a mile heat two days later, and won another sweepstakes on September 14.

== Pedigree ==
Pedigree of Culpepper
Sire Revolver 1862	Revenue 1843	Trustee	Catton
Sire Revolver 1862	Revenue 1843	Trustee	Emma
Sire Revolver 1862	Revenue 1843	Rosalie Somers	Sir Charles*^
Sire Revolver 1862	Revenue 1843	Rosalie Somers	Mischief
Sire Revolver 1862	Balloon 1852	Yorkshire	St Nicholas
Sire Revolver 1862	Balloon 1852	Yorkshire	Miss Rose
Sire Revolver 1862	Balloon 1852	Heraldry	Herald
Sire Revolver 1862	Balloon 1852	Heraldry	Margaret Wood
Dam Gentle Annie 1862	Ringgold 1842	Boston	Timoleon*^
Dam Gentle Annie 1862	Ringgold 1842	Boston	Sister to Tuckahoe
Dam Gentle Annie 1862	Ringgold 1842	Flirtilla	Sir Archy*
Dam Gentle Annie 1862	Ringgold 1842	Flirtilla	Old Flirtilla*^
Dam Gentle Annie 1862	Anna Farris 1850	Altorf	Flyde
Dam Gentle Annie 1862	Anna Farris 1850	Altorf	Countess Plater
Dam Gentle Annie 1862	Anna Farris 1850	Phoebe	Prince Richard
Dam Gentle Annie 1862	Anna Farris 1850	Phoebe	Buzzard Mare

*^ Culpepper is inbred 5S x 5D x 4D x 5D to the stallion Sir Archy, meaning that he appears fifth generation (via Sir Charles)^ on the sire side of his pedigree and fourth generation once and fifth generation twice (via Timoleon and Old Flirtilla)^ on the dam side of his pedigree.
