= Lord Murphy =

American-bred Thoroughbred racehorse

- Sire: Pat Malloy
- Grandsire: Lexington
- Dam: Wenonah
- Damsire: Captain Elgee
- Sex: Stallion
- Foaled: 1876
- Country: United States
- Colour: Bay
- Breeder: J. T. Carter
- Owner: 1) George W. Darden & Co. 2) James R. Keene
- Trainer: George Rice
- Record: 14: 6-5-0
- Earnings: $11,400

Major wins
- Belle Meade Stakes (1879); Kentucky St. Leger Stakes (1879); January Stakes (1879) American Classics race wins: Kentucky Derby (1879)

Lord Murphy (1876 – after 1881) was an American thoroughbred racehorse that was bred in Tennessee and is best known for winning the 1879 Kentucky Derby. He was originally named Patmus and was a grandson of Lexington. He descended from the Byerly Turk.

The 5th Kentucky Derby was run on a fast track with a field of nine horses, including the notable racer and future leading sire Falsetto. Lord Murphy was knocked almost to his knees by Ada Glenn on the first turn, but managed to pull himself up from 7th to 1st place at the mile marker to win over the fast approaching Falsetto.

Lord Murphy was bought soon after his Derby win by horseman James R. Keene, who promptly shipped him overseas to the British racing circuit. His arrival was greeted with interest in Britain, as he was "purely American", rather than being bred from relatively recent European exports. Lord Murphy did not race well in Britain, being unplaced in the 1880 Chatsworth Handicap Plate at Derby and the 1881 Visitors Plate run at the Craven meeting. He acquired a "savage" temper and became a "roarer", an ailment that Keene thought developed secondary to the change in weather between the United States and England. Keene sold Lord Murphy to Richard Ten Broeck in May 1881. He was later sold at a British public auction in Newmarket on July 6, 1881, the horse fetching a small sum of 10 guineas ($50).

== Pedigree ==
Pedigree of Lord Murphy
Sire Pat Malloy 1865	Lexington 1850	Boston	Timoleon
Sire Pat Malloy 1865	Lexington 1850	Boston	Sister to Tuckahoe
Sire Pat Malloy 1865	Lexington 1850	Alice Carneal	Sarpedon
Sire Pat Malloy 1865	Lexington 1850	Alice Carneal	Rowena
Sire Pat Malloy 1865	Gloriana 1846	American Eclipse	Duroc
Sire Pat Malloy 1865	Gloriana 1846	American Eclipse	Millers Damsel
Sire Pat Malloy 1865	Gloriana 1846	Trifle	Sir Charles
Sire Pat Malloy 1865	Gloriana 1846	Trifle	Cicero Mare
Dam Wenonah 1863	Captain Elgee 1846	Leviathan	Muley
Dam Wenonah 1863	Captain Elgee 1846	Leviathan	Windle Mare
Dam Wenonah 1863	Captain Elgee 1846	Reel	Glencoe I
Dam Wenonah 1863	Captain Elgee 1846	Reel	Gallopade
Dam Wenonah 1863	Albion Mare Unknown	Albion	Actaeon
Dam Wenonah 1863	Albion Mare Unknown	Albion	Panthea
Dam Wenonah 1863	Albion Mare Unknown	Pacific Mare	Pacific
Dam Wenonah 1863	Albion Mare Unknown	Pacific Mare	Bet Bosley Jr.
