= Leviathan (horse) =

British racehorse

- Sire: Muley
- Grandsire: Orville
- Dam: Windle Mare (GB)
- Damsire: Windle (GB)
- Sex: Stallion
- Foaled: 1823
- Country: Great Britain
- Color: Chestnut
- Breeder: John Painter
- Owner: John Painter (1825); Thomas Giffard (1826-1827)
- Record: 21: 16-4-0

Major wins
- Dee Stakes (1826); Wrottesley Stakes (1826); Bradby Stakes (1826); Staffordshire Stakes (1826); Ludlow Gold Cup (1827); Derby Gold Cup (1827); Warwick Gold Cup (1827); Lichfield Gold Cup (1827)

Awards
- Leading sire in North America (1837, 1838, 1839, 1843, 1848)

Leviathan (1823–1846) was a British Thoroughbred racehorse who won 16 of 21 starts before injury prompted his retirement. Imported into Tennessee in 1830, he was the leading sire in North America of 1837, 1838, 1839, 1843 and 1848, and also finished second five times. He was also an important broodmare sire, with modern descendants through the female line including Affirmed, Alydar and Dance Smartly.

== Background ==
Leviathan was a chestnut stallion of a "peculiar shade of deep red or mahogany" with a narrow blaze as his sole white marking. He was bred by John Painter and foaled in 1823 at Dean's Hill stud in Staffordshire. He was sired by Muley, who won two of five starts in his racing career. Muley originally received little support at stud until Leviathan helped establish his reputation. Muley would subsequently sire three classic winners: Margrave, Vespa and Little Wonder. Leviathan's dam was an unnamed daughter of Windle.

Originally named Mezereon, the horse was renamed Leviathan after he was sold to Thomas Giffard at age three. The name reflected his size of 16 hands (64 inches, 163 cm), then considered very large for a Thoroughbred, and build. A later stallion advertisement said, "His shoulder-blades are longer, more capacious... than in any other large horse; and, in fact I have seen no horse 15 hands high, whose back is shorter... The sweep in the hind-quarter... is incomparably greater than in any other horse that has been offered to the citizens of Tennessee... He has fine withers, great depth of brisket, great depth of flank, great frame; great length and substance in the bones and muscles of all his quarters, with the very best adaptation of all the parts; and though some object to the too great length of his neck, I am satisfied that seeming defect arises from the great obliquity of his shoulders... The whole assemblage of parts gives him, if not the most beautiful, at least the most grand and majestic appearance."

== Racing career ==
Leviathan (then named Mezereon) raced twice at age two for Painter. He won his first start, a six-furlong sweepstakes at Burton-on-Trent. He then finished second to Little Bo-peep at Wolverhampton.

At age three, Leviathan was undefeated in nine starts for his new owner Giffard. In May, he won the Dee Stakes at Chester at a distance of just over one mile. The next day, he won a sweepstakes over his only rival, Cestus. He made his next start in August at Wolverhampton in the Wrottesley Stakes, defeating his only competitor, Granby, over a distance of about a mile. He then traveled to Burton-on-Trent, where he beat Little Bo-peep in a one-mile sweepstakes. Soon afterwards, he won the Bradby Stakes over about two miles. In September, he traveled to Warwick, where he won both the St. Leger Stakes (Note: Not to be confused with the classic St Leger Stakes at Doncaster) by walkover and another sweepstakes. He made his final start of the year in late September at Shrewsbury, beating Sancredo in the St. Leger Stakes.

At age four, Leviathan won six of nine starts, finishing second the other three times. In his first start at Chester, he finished second to Dr. Faustus in the Stand Cup. He won his next start, a two-mile sweepstakes at Chester, over Flexible. Traveling to Ludlow, he was beaten by Paul Fry in a 1 1/2-mile sweepstakes, then won the Ludlow Gold Cup over three miles, defeating Cain, Paul Pry and Palatine. In July, he won the Derby Gold Cup at Derby. At Wolverhampton, he finished second to Euxton in the Darlington Cup over 3 miles. He made his only start over 4 miles in the Gold Cup at Warwick, in which he defeated Euxton in a time of seven minutes flat. His final start was the Gold Cup at Lichfield over 3 miles, which he won by walkover.

Leviathan was then sold for 2,000 guineas to King George IV, who was interested in winning the Ascot Gold Cup, which was rapidly increasing in prestige. However, Leviathan became unsound and was given a year off to recuperate. He made one last start in 1829 in the Wokingham Stakes at Ascot but was unplaced.

== Stud career ==
Leviathan first stood for stud in 1830 at Bretby Park for George Stanhope, 6th Earl of Chesterfield. His first crop included four winners with two stakes winners, Alexis and Banquet. In July 1830, Leviathan was sold to James Jackson of Alabama. Leviathan arrived on November 14 at the stud farm of Jackson's racing partner George Elliot in Gallatin, Tennessee. He became the first imported stallion to stand in the "west" since the Revolutionary War and helped establish Tennessee as the center of the southern bloodstock breeding industry. He led the North America sire list in 1837, 1838, 1839, 1843 and 1848, and also finished second five times. He sired many winners who "had almost unprecedented success at all distances, from Nashville to Orleans". In his book Making the American Thoroughbred, James Douglas Anderson stated, "Throughout the entire country he was regarded as "the modern Sir Archy. If you don't know the story of Leviathan you don't know the history of Tennessee."

Leviathan's notable progeny include:

- Angora (filly, 1832), an "elite" racehorse, especially over the four-mile heat racing format that was common at the time
- Lilac (filly, 1832), "one of the fastest horses on earth"
- Linnet (filly, 1832), multiple stakes winner including the Jockey Club Purse in Nashville and New Orleans
- Zelina (filly, 1832), winner of 14 heat races at distances from one to four miles, with earnings of $13,000
- Wacousta (colt, 1832), multiple wins including the Jockey Club Purse at Florence, Alabama
- Othello (colt, 1832), winner of the Jockey Club Purse at Gallatin, Nashville and Huntsville
- The Poney (colt, 1834), multiple wins including the Jockey Club Purse at Alabama
- Sarah Bladen (filly, 1834), considered his best daughter, with multiple wins from 1836 to 1842 including the Jockey Club Purse at Natchez and New Orleans
- Beeswing (filly, 1835), winner of eight races including the Jockey Club Purse at New Orleans
- Fandango (filly, 1836), winner of the Champagne Stakes and Jockey Club Purse in Mobile
- Celerity (filly, 1837), winner of the New Orleans Plate and others
- Flight (filly, 1837), won the Barry Sweepstakes after Celerity fell
- John R. Grymes (colt, 1837), won the Proprietor's Purse and Jockey Club Purse at New Orleans
- Jeannettau (filly, 1840), won the Association Purse and Proprietor's Purse at St. Louis
- Ann Hayes (filly, 1840), successful from two to four miles, wins include Jockey Club Purse at Oakley, Mississippi and New Orleans

Some of Leviathan's sons showed promise at stud but the southern breeding industry was disrupted by the American Civil War and his male line became extinct. Several of Leviathan's daughters became important broodmares, and some of their families still exist. Among his most important producers were:

- Fandango (1836, out of Galopade by Catton). Female line descendants include Domino, Hamburg, Twilight Tear and Affirmed
- Cotillion (1837, also out of Galopade by Catton). Female line descendants include Discovery, Crozier and important broodmare No Class, whose descendants include Dance Smartly and Smart Strike
- Flight (1837, out of Charlotte Hamilton by Sir Charles). Third dam of Himyar
- Leviathan Mare (1842, out of Anna Marie by Truffle). Descendants include Alydar, Our Mims, Codex and Forward Pass.

== Sire line tree ==
- Leviathan
  - Othello
    - Iago
    - Jumping Mullet
    - Argo
    - Corbia
  - Hugh L French
  - The Poney
  - Wacousta
  - Pete Whetstone
  - Boyd McNairy
  - John R Grymes
  - Outrage
  - Stanley
  - Tom Marshall
  - John Ross
  - Envoy
  - Black Satin
  - Ebony
  - Stafford
  - Capt Elgee
  - Jack Hays

== Pedigree ==
Pedigree of Leviathan, chestnut horse, 1823
Sire Muley 1810	Orville; 1799	Beningbrough*	King Fergus*
Sire Muley 1810	Orville; 1799	Beningbrough*	Herod mare^
Sire Muley 1810	Orville; 1799	Evelina	Highflyer*^
Sire Muley 1810	Orville; 1799	Evelina	Termagant
Sire Muley 1810	Eleanor; 1798	Whiskey	Saltram^
Sire Muley 1810	Eleanor; 1798	Whiskey	Calash^
Sire Muley 1810	Eleanor; 1798	Young Giantess	Diomed
Sire Muley 1810	Eleanor; 1798	Young Giantess	Giantess
Dam Windle mare 1809	Windle; 1804	Beningbrough*	King Fergus*
Dam Windle mare 1809	Windle; 1804	Beningbrough*	Herod mare^
Dam Windle mare 1809	Windle; 1804	Mary Ann	Sir Peter Teazle^
Dam Windle mare 1809	Windle; 1804	Mary Ann	Young Marske Mare (Note: The names of several horses in Leviathan's pedigree are not recorded in The Jockey Club's online pedigree database Equineline. The names shown are from other sources including Pedigreequery.com)
Dam Windle mare 1809	Anvil mare 1888	Anvil	Herod
Dam Windle mare 1809	Anvil mare 1888	Anvil	Feather mare
Dam Windle mare 1809	Anvil mare 1888	Virago*^	Snap
Dam Windle mare 1809	Anvil mare 1888	Virago*^	Regulus mare

* Leviathan is inbred 3S x 3D to the stallion Beningbrough, meaning that he appears third generation on the sire side of his pedigree and third generation on the dam side of his pedigree.

*^ Leviathan is inbred 5S x 3D to the mare Virago, meaning that she appears fifth generation (via Saltram)^ on the sire side of his pedigree and third generation on the dam side of his pedigree.

*^ Leviathan is inbred 4S x 5D to the stallion Highflyer, meaning that he appears fourth generation on the sire side of his pedigree and fifth generation (via Sir Peter Teazle)^ on the dam side of his pedigree.

*^ Leviathan is inbred 5S x 5S x 5S x 5D x 4D to the stallion Herod, meaning that he appears fifth generation thrice (via Herod mare, Highflyer, and Calash)^ on the sire side of his pedigree and fifth generation once (via Herod mare)^ and fourth generation once on the dam side of his pedigree.
