= Lady Lightfoot =

American Thoroughbred racehorse

- Sire: Sir Archy
- Grandsire: Diomed
- Dam: Black Maria
- Damsire: Shark
- Sex: Filly
- Foaled: 1812
- Country: United States
- Colour: Brown
- Breeder: Col. John Tayloe III
- Owner: several over the years
- Trainer: General William Wynn
- Record: Unknown
- Earnings: Unknown
- Last updated on January 6, 2008

Lady Lightfoot (born 1812), was an American Thoroughbred racing mare.

== Background ==
A product of the very first crop of one of America's foremost stallions, Sir Archy, Lady Lightfoot was almost certainly his best daughter. Lady Lightfoot was bred by John Tayloe III and foaled at Belair Stud in Maryland. (Tayloe had a hand in many a great horse's life, especially in her sire's life. Though Sir Archy would eventually "stand" in North Carolina, in those days, sires often traveled from farm to farm selling their "services.")

== Racing career ==
In the filly's very first race, a three heat effort of four miles per heat, she went up against a horse called Hermaphrodite. He won the first heat, and she won the next two. The time clocked for Hermaphrodite's win was 7 minutes 52 seconds. Lady Lightfoot's time for the last two heats was 7 minutes 53 seconds and 7 minutes 52 seconds. These are the fastest times for four miles in Maryland in her day.

The racing records during Lady Lightfoot's life are incomplete. Some say she started 23 times, 15 of these starts in 4 mile heats. Others say there is evidence she could have won 30 or 40 races. It's for certain that in the year 1817 when she was five years old, under her trainer William Wynn (known as "Racing Billy"), she and her half-brother Timoleon, won five of the six races in the Charleston, Virginia winter meet.

One of the few races Lady Lightfoot lost was to one of America's greats, American Eclipse. On October 15, 1821 at the Union Course on Long Island, New York when Lady Lightfoot was nine, American Eclipse at age 7 beat her in straight heats.

Lady Lightfoot raced right through her eleventh year.

== Breeding record ==
When Lady Lightfoot produced she dropped eight foals in nine years. Several of her foals achieved fame, especially her great daughter, Black Maria by her old rival American Eclipse. (Not to be confused with Lady Lightfoot's dam, also called Black Maria.) Many consider Black Maria a greater runner than her dam.

Lady Lightfoot seems to have died soon after her last foal, making the date 1832 or 1833. She would have been 19 or 20 years old.
