= 1879 Kentucky Derby =

Horse race

5th Kentucky Derby
- Kentucky Derby
- Grade I stakes race
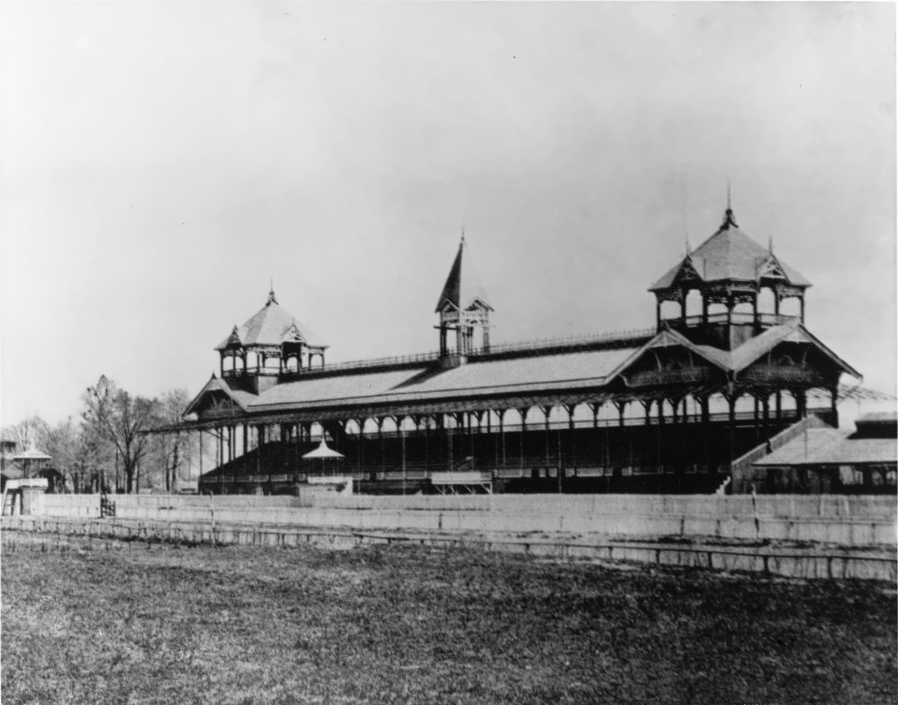
- Grandstands at the Louisville Jockey Club and Driving Park Association, later known as Churchill Downs
- Location: Churchill Downs
- Date: May 20, 1879
- Winning horse: Lord Murphy
- Jockey: Charlie Shauer
- Trainer: George Rice
- Owner: Geo. W. Darden & Co.
- Surface: Dirt

The 1879 Kentucky Derby was the 5th running of the Kentucky Derby. The race took place on May 20, 1879. The winning horse Lord Murphy set a new Derby record with a winning time of 2:37.00. Lord Murphy was not the first horse out of the starting gate. He then dramatically collided with another horse and stumbled badly. However he recovered and achieved his note-worthy finish. He was the first horse foaled in Tennessee to win the Derby. Two more natives of that state would go on to win future Derbys.

== Full results ==
Finished	Post	Horse	Jockey	Trainer	Owner	Time / behind
1st		Lord Murphy	Charles Shauer	George Rice	Geo. W. Darden & Co.	2:37.00
2nd		Falsetto	Isaac Murphy		J.W.H. Reynolds	
3rd		Strathmore	Hightower		George Cadwallader	
4th		Trinidad	Alonzo Allen		Daniel Swigert	
5th		One Dime	L. Jones		G. W. Bowen & Co.	
6th		General Pike	John Stoval		Gen. Abe Buford	
7th		Ada Glenn	Ramey		G. D. Wilson	
8th		Buckner	D. Edwards		H. W. Farris	
9th		Wissahickon	L. Hawkins		H. Price McGrath	

== Payout ==
- The winner received a purse of $3,550.
- Second place received $200.
