= Fashion (horse) =

19th-century American Thoroughbred race mare

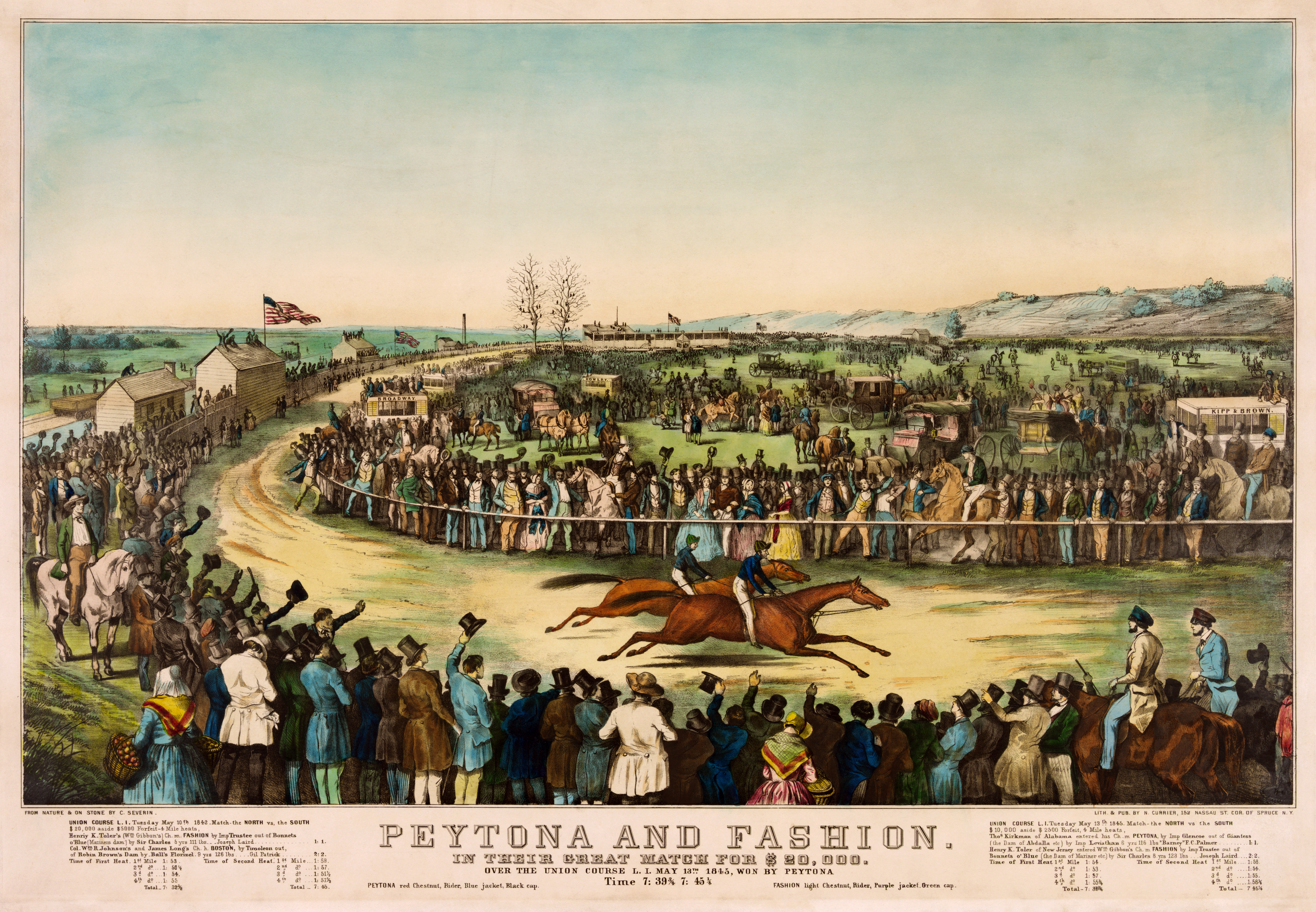
- "Fashion meets Peytona"
- Sire: Trustee (GB)
- Grandsire: Catton
- Dam: Bonnets o' Blue
- Damsire: Sir Charles
- Sex: Mare
- Foaled: 1837
- Country: United States
- Colour: Chestnut
- Breeder: William Gibbons
- Owner: 1. William Gibbons; 2. John Reber
- Trainer: Samuel Laird
- Record: 36: 32-4-0
- Earnings: $41,500

Honours
- United States Racing Hall of Fame inductee (1980)

Fashion (1837–1860) was a Thoroughbred four-mile (6,400 meter) racemare that defeated Boston and set a record of 7:32½, for that distance, before the American Civil War. Until her meeting with Peytona, Fashion had started 24 times, and won 23 races, 14 of which were of four-mile heats, 6 of 3-mile heats and 3 of 2-mile heats for earnings of $35,600.

She was sired by Trustee out of Bonnets o' Blue.

== Racing career ==
Owned and bred by William Gibbons in Madison, New Jersey (the farm was located on land that today accommodates Drew University), the chestnut Fashion was considered the best race mare of her generation, or any generation that came before her. In 36 starts, Fashion won 32 times and defeated Boston twice. She was sired by Trustee (foaled in Great Britain in 1829) out of Bonnets o' Blue (foaled in 1827 and by Sir Charles by Sir Archy). Trustee was taken out of retirement at the age of twenty to prove to the young folks how good he had been in his racing days. At that age, he ran a four-mile heat in eight minutes flat. Bonnets O'Blue won the National Colt Stakes and a $10,000 match race against Goliah, by Eclipse, over the Union Course in 1831. Her dam was Reality, by Sir Archy, making Bonnets O'Blue inbred to Sir Archy (by Diomed) in the second generation.

In Fashion's day, races were four miles (6,400 meters) long and run in grueling heats with each heat usually covering four miles. These races were not contested on tracks; they could be set anywhere the race organizers decided to set them.

William Gibbons was a modest man who only raced horses he'd bred himself, and he never bet. He disliked ostentation, but the public demand for Fashion's match races was huge and he gave in to their pressure more than once. It is said that 70,000 people showed up for the match between Boston and Fashion. Carrier pigeons carried the news of each heat to New York City newspapers.

Samuel Laird of Colts Neck Inn, Colts Neck, New Jersey, trained Fashion throughout her career, and Laird's son, Joseph T Laird, always rode as jockey.

=== North versus South Match Race ===
On 10 May 1842, at the age of five years, Fashion met Boston in a well-publicized match race at the Union Course on Long Island, New York, with 70,000 people witnessing the event. In the first heat, the nine-year-old Boston (carrying 126 pounds) cut open a long, jagged gash on his hip against a rail. He and five-year-old Fashion (carrying 124 pounds) were upset by the crowd often surging onto the track. Boston led for three miles, but Fashion won by 35 lengths setting a new world record of 7:32½ for a four-mile race.

=== Peytona versus Fashion ===
Boston and Fashion did not meet again, although there was pressure to do so. Instead a new rival from the south, a mare called Peytona who had amassed more money over a shorter career than Fashion, appeared. Peytona won her stake money by racing in one particular event, an affair very reminiscent of today's "futurities" where bets are placed well in advance of a race, in this case years in advance. Peytona was an undefeated mare with a long stride of 27 feet (8.2 m), which would have rivaled the great Longfellow's stride.

The match was set for May 15, 1845, again at the Union Course. It was the last epic match race held at that location. The crowd estimate was a possible 100,000 people. Fashion was the slight favorite. The biggest betting was not on who might win, but on the time the race would be run in. By the day of Peytona's winning race, only four horses showed up, Peytona won a huge stake, and the organizer lost money.

On the morning of the match, reports came down that Fashion was under the influence of her estrous cycle, but the race went on. The smaller Fashion carried 123 pounds. The larger mare, Peytona, carried 116 pounds. Peytona won in straight heats. However, Fashion came out of the match in good condition, while Peytona came out feverish in both front legs. Both mares had been entered in the Jockey Club Purse a few days later but only Fashion competed, winning easily. When Peytona and Fashion met again, this time Fashion won.

Fashion continued racing until she was eleven years old. She ran in a total of 68 heats and won 55, with earnings of $41,500.

== Stud record ==
Fashion produced seven foals in nine years, three of which were by her half-brother, Mariner (by Shark). The two fillies by him, Etiquette (1853) and A la Mode (1854), were winners.

In 1855 Fashion was sold in foal to Monarch, along with her weanling filly, Young Fashion (by Monarch), and A La Mode, to John Reber of Lancaster, Ohio.

Young Fashion produced ten foals, six of which were winners, and the mares continued the family for several generations. Her daughter, Bonnie Kate, produced the speedy stakes mare, Bonnie Lizzie. Another Young Fashion daughter, Columbia, was the dam of Double Cross, the sire of Guido, an American record holder for mile heats.

Fashion died in 1860.

== Honors ==
Ladies' gloves were devised in Fashion's name, as were men's cigars. She had more than one steamboat named after her and more than one hotel. Fashion was inducted into the National Museum of Racing and Hall of Fame in 1980, 120 years after her death.

== Pedigree ==
Pedigree of Fashion, chestnut mare, foaled 1837
Sire Trustee ch. 1829	Catton b. 1809	Golumpus b. 1802	Gohanna
Sire Trustee ch. 1829	Catton b. 1809	Golumpus b. 1802	Catherine
Sire Trustee ch. 1829	Catton b. 1809	Lucy Grey ch. 1804	Timothy
Sire Trustee ch. 1829	Catton b. 1809	Lucy Grey ch. 1804	Lucy
Sire Trustee ch. 1829	Emma ch. 1824	Whisker b. 1812	Waxy
Sire Trustee ch. 1829	Emma ch. 1824	Whisker b. 1812	Penelope
Sire Trustee ch. 1829	Emma ch. 1824	Gibside Fairy b. 1811	Hermes
Sire Trustee ch. 1829	Emma ch. 1824	Gibside Fairy b. 1811	Vicissitude
Dam Bonnets O'Blue gr. 1827	Sir Charles ch. 1816	Sir Archy* b. 1805	Diomed*
Dam Bonnets O'Blue gr. 1827	Sir Charles ch. 1816	Sir Archy* b. 1805	Castianira*
Dam Bonnets O'Blue gr. 1827	Sir Charles ch. 1816	Citizen mare ch. 1810	Citizen
Dam Bonnets O'Blue gr. 1827	Sir Charles ch. 1816	Citizen mare ch. 1810	Commutation mare
Dam Bonnets O'Blue gr. 1827	Reality gr. 1813	Sir Archy* b. 1805	Diomed*
Dam Bonnets O'Blue gr. 1827	Reality gr. 1813	Sir Archy* b. 1805	Castianira*
Dam Bonnets O'Blue gr. 1827	Reality gr. 1813	Medley mare gr. 1792	Medley
Dam Bonnets O'Blue gr. 1827	Reality gr. 1813	Medley mare gr. 1792	Centinel mare (Family A44)

* Fashion is inbred 3D x 3D to the stallion Sir Archy, meaning that he appears third generation twice on the dam side of her pedigree.

== See also ==
- List of leading Thoroughbred racehorses
