= What a Pleasure =

American-bred Thoroughbred racehorse

What A Pleasure
- Sire: Bold Ruler
- Grandsire: Nasrullah
- Dam: Grey Flight
- Damsire: Mahmoud
- Sex: Stallion
- Foaled: 1965
- Country: United States
- Colour: Chestnut
- Breeder: Wheatley Stable
- Owner: Wheatley Stable
- Trainer: Edward A. Neloy
- Record: 18: 6-5-2
- Earnings: $164,935

Major wins
- National Stallion Stakes (1967); Hopeful Stakes (1967)

Awards
- Leading sire in North America (1975, 1976)

Honours
- What a Pleasure Stakes

What a Pleasure (1965–1983) was a Thoroughbred stallion bred at Claiborne Farm in Kentucky for the Wheatley Stables of Glady Phipps. Sired by the leading stallion Bold Ruler, and out of a Mahmoud mare Grey Flight, he excelled on the track and in his stud career. Like his sire, he would go on to become a leading North American stallion; producing Eclipse Award winners and Kentucky Derby winners.

== Race career ==
What A Pleasure, trained by Edward Neloy, would peak as a juvenile winning the National Stallion Stakes in the summer of his two-year-old season. In August of that same year he would run second in the Monmouth Park Sapling Stakes in preparation for the Hopeful Stakes later in that same month. He would win this showing and it is considered his best performance. What A Pleasure would go on to race as a three-year-old and ran a decent third in the Gotham Stakes, but he never regained his two-year-old form. Richard Ulbrich of 'Peerage of Racehorses' claims the colt had wrenched his hip after his victory in the Hopeful and this may have dampened his form as a three-year-old. He was retired to stud in 1969 at Florida's Waldemar Farms.

== Stud career ==
As a sire, What A Pleasure would be the leading sire consecutively in 1975 and 1976 by producing horses like Derby winner Foolish Pleasure, Eclipse Two-Year-Old Colt Honest Pleasure, Gr.1 winner For the Moment, Gr.1 winner Fairway Phantom, and the extensive stakes winner Gene's Lady. Out of four hundred and ninety-eight foals over ten percent were stakes winners. What A Pleasure stood in Florida until his death in March 1983 from a heart attack.

== Pedigree ==
Pedigree of What a Pleasure, chestnut stallion, April 24, 1965
Sire Bold Ruler	Nasrullah	Nearco	Pharos
Sire Bold Ruler	Nasrullah	Nearco	Nogara
Sire Bold Ruler	Nasrullah	Mumtaz Begum	Blenheim
Sire Bold Ruler	Nasrullah	Mumtaz Begum	Mumtaz Mahal
Sire Bold Ruler	Miss Disco	Discovery	Display
Sire Bold Ruler	Miss Disco	Discovery	Ariadne
Sire Bold Ruler	Miss Disco	Outdone	Pompey
Sire Bold Ruler	Miss Disco	Outdone	Sweep Out
Dam Grey Flight	Mahmoud	Blenheim	Blandford
Dam Grey Flight	Mahmoud	Blenheim	Malva
Dam Grey Flight	Mahmoud	Mah Mahal	Gainsborough
Dam Grey Flight	Mahmoud	Mah Mahal	Mumtaz Mahal
Dam Grey Flight	Planetoid	Ariel	Eternal
Dam Grey Flight	Planetoid	Ariel	Adana
Dam Grey Flight	Planetoid	La Chica	Sweep
Dam Grey Flight	Planetoid	La Chica	La Grisette (family: 5-f§)

§ What a Pleasure Native Dancer is shown as descending from (family 5-f), which traces back to the Bazajet Mare. However, the female descendants of his third-dam La Chica have a type of mitochondrial DNA that is inconsistent with other descendants of this family. As mitochondrial DNA is passed exclusively in the female line, this indicates a pedigree error occurred at some point between the Bazajet Mare's foaling in 1754 and La Chica's in 1930.

What a Pleasure was inbred 4S x 3D to Blenheim, meaning this stallion appears in the fourth generation of the sire's side of his pedigree and in the third generation of the dam's side. What a Pleasure is also inbred 4S x 4D to Mumtaz Mahal.
