= General Duke (horse) =

19th-century American Thoroughbred racehorse

- Sire: Lexington
- Grandsire: Boston
- Dam: Lilla
- Damsire: Yorkshire
- Sex: Stallion
- Foaled: 1865
- Died: 1888
- Country: United States
- Colour: Chestnut
- Breeder: Robert A. Alexander; Woodburn Stud
- Owner: McConnell & Harness
- Trainer: A. Thompson
- Record: 32 starts, 18 wins in 6 years
- Earnings: $17,915 (equivalent to $413,000 in 2025)

Major wins
- Providence Stakes (1868) American Classics wins: Belmont Stakes (1868)

Honours
- American Champion Three-Year-Old Colt (1868)

General Duke (born 1865) was an American Thoroughbred racehorse who won the second running of the Belmont Stakes in 1868. A son of Lexington, he was bred by Robert A. Alexander in Kentucky. He raced as a two-year-old, winning twice, including a stakes race. As a three-year-old, he raced nine times, winning six races, including several stakes. His final racing record was 18 wins from 32 starts. He was later known as Judge Curtis, and after his racing career ended he was a breeding stallion in Canada before dying in Illinois in 1888. Three of his daughters won stakes races.

== Early life ==
General Duke was sired by Lexington, and out of Lilla, who was by the imported stallion Yorkshire. General Duke was foaled in 1865 and was a chestnut stallion. He was bred by Robert A. Alexander at Woodburn Stud in Kentucky. Both of his back legs were white to the pastern.

== Racing career ==
General Duke's first start on the racetrack was in 1867, in the Saratoga Stakes on August 9. He placed third in that race, which was 3/4 mile (1,200 meters) and limited to two-year-old horses. He carried 90 pounds (41 kilograms) and raced for McConnell and Harness. He then raced on August 12, for the same owners at the same distance in a race for two-year-olds, which he won in 1 minute 20 1/4 seconds. Both of these races were at Saratoga Race Course in New York. On September 26, 1867, General Duke started in a race at Cincinnati, Ohio, the Cincinnati Stakes. This was a 1 mile (1,600 m) race for two-year-olds, which General Duke won in 1 minute 45 1/2 seconds carrying 86 pounds (39 kg). He was at that time still owned by McConnell and Harness.

As a three-year-old, General Duke first started at the Secaucus Racetrack in New Jersey on May 29, 1868. This race was a mile-heat race, run as three separate 1 mile (1,600 m) races. Racing again for McConnell and Harness, General Duke finished 3rd in each of the three heats. The next race he started was the Belmont Stakes on June 10, 1868, which was run at the Jerome Park Racetrack. The Belmont was run at a 1 5/8 miles (2,600 m). General Duke won while carrying 110 pounds (50 kg), in a time of 3 minutes and 2 seconds. His jockey for the race was Robert Swim, and the trainer was A. Thompson. The horse led from the start, even though he had reared up with his jockey before the beginning of the race. He was the first of four winners of the Belmont sired by Lexington.

On June 17, General Duke came in second in a sweepstakes race at 2 miles (3,200 m) distance. On July 2, he won a sweepstakes race for three-year-olds at a distance of a 1 3/4 miles (2,800 m). On August 10, at Saratoga, he won the Sequel Stakes over 2 miles (3,200 m) in a time of 3 minutes 40 3/4 seconds. He carried 115 pounds (52 kg) in that race. On August 25, 1868, he won the Providence Stake at Narragansett Race Track, in Rhode Island. This race was a 1 1/2 miles (2,400 m), and he carried 110 pounds (50 kg) during his winning time of 2 minutes and 44 seconds. The same day, he won a heat race, with two 2 miles (3,200 m) heats, placing first in both heats. He next started at the Jerome Park Racetrack in New York on October 7, 1868, in a cup race over 2 1/8 miles (3,400 m). He placed second while carrying 95 pounds (43 kg). His last start of the year was on October 8, when he won a 1 3/4 miles (2,800 m) race with a time of 3 minutes and 13 seconds.

General Duke's final racing career totals were 32 starts and 18 wins, with total earnings on the track of $17,915 (equivalent to $413,000 in 2025). His career spanned six years on the track. He was named Champion Three-Year-Old in 1868. In 1870, he was the first horse to run a mile in 1 minute, 4.5 seconds. When he was four and five, he was owned by Charles Littlefield, but was subsequently sold to Joseph O'Donnell. O'Donnell changed the horse's name to Judge Curtis; something that has never happened to any other winner of a United States Triple Crown race.

As Judge Curtis, he was used as a breeding stallion in Canada but died in 1888 in Monmouth, Illinois. Three of his daughters won stakes races: His daughter Bonnie Bird, foaled in 1876, won the Queen's Plate at Woodbine Racetrack in 1880. Her full sister Bonnie Duke, foaled in 1882, won the same race in 1887. His 1882 daughter Curtolima won the 1885 Woodstock Plate Handicap, now called the Woodstock Stakes.

== Pedigree ==
Pedigree of General Duke
Sire Lexington 1850	Boston 1833	Timoleon	Sir Archy
Sire Lexington 1850	Boston 1833	Timoleon	Saltram Mare
Sire Lexington 1850	Boston 1833	Sister to Tuckahoe	Balls Florizel
Sire Lexington 1850	Boston 1833	Sister to Tuckahoe	Alderman Mare
Sire Lexington 1850	Alice Carneal 1836	Sarpedeon	Emilius
Sire Lexington 1850	Alice Carneal 1836	Sarpedeon	Icaria
Sire Lexington 1850	Alice Carneal 1836	Rowena	Sumpter
Sire Lexington 1850	Alice Carneal 1836	Rowena	Lady Grey
Dam Lilla 1856	Yorkshire 1834	St. Nicholas	Emilius
Dam Lilla 1856	Yorkshire 1834	St. Nicholas	Sea Mew
Dam Lilla 1856	Yorkshire 1834	Miss Rose	Tramp
Dam Lilla 1856	Yorkshire 1834	Miss Rose	Sancho Mare
Dam Lilla 1856	Victoire 1847	Margrave	Muley
Dam Lilla 1856	Victoire 1847	Margrave	Election Mare
Dam Lilla 1856	Victoire 1847	Argentile	Bertrand
Dam Lilla 1856	Victoire 1847	Argentile	Allegrante
