= Steel Dust =

Early Quarter Horse stallion

- Breed: American Quarter Horse
- Discipline: Race horse, stock horse
- Sire: Harry Bluff
- Sex: Stallion
- Foaled: 1843
- Country: United States
- Color: Bay

Major wins
- Match race against Monmouth

Steel Dust was one of the founding sires of the American Quarter Horse. Very little is verifiable about his history and there is much conjecture and disagreement amongst sources.

== Life ==
Steel Dust was foaled about 1843 in Kentucky. His sire was Harry Bluff, whose sire was Short Whip (or Short's Whip) and dam was Big Nance, a descendant of Timoleon. It is believed that he was taken to Texas in 1845 by Middleton Perry and Jones Greene, where he was used as a work horse and was run in match races. He was bay in color, just over fifteen hands high, and weighed about 1,200 pounds.

Steel Dust won his most important race, held in Collin County, Texas, as a three-year-old against a horse named Monmouth. He was retired after an injury, and died sometime between 1864 and 1874.

== See also ==
- List of historical horses
