= Glenelg (horse) =

American-bred Thoroughbred racehorse

- Sire: Citadel
- Grandsire: Stockwell
- Dam: Babta
- Damsire: Kingston
- Sex: Stallion
- Foaled: 1866
- Country: United States
- Colour: Bay
- Breeder: Sir Roderick W. Cameron
- Owner: M. H. Sanford
- Record: 18: 10-4-3
- Earnings: $25,700

Major wins
- Travers Stakes (1869); Jerome Stakes (1869); Maturity Stakes (1870); Breakfast Stakes (1870); Bowie Stakes (1870); Excelsior Stakes (1870)

Awards
- Leading sire in North America (1884, 1886-1888)

Glenelg (foaled 1866) was a thoroughbred conceived in England but born in the United States after his dam was imported into the US in 1866. Bred from two horses of no notable talent, he became one of the most influential sires of his time. He excelled both on the track and in the breeding shed.

== On the Track ==
As a yearling, Glenelg was purchased by August Belmont for $2,000. Due to his size and temperament it was decided that he should not race as a two-year-old. To give him time to mature, he was not started until well into his three-year-old season, his first start being in the Belmont Stakes. Belmont wanted Glenelg's stable-mate, Fenian, to win, so Glenelg was held back in second. He went on to the Jerome Stakes, beating Vespucius but lost to that colt a week later in the Annual Stakes. He then won the Travers Stakes and finished his three-year-old season with one more victory, giving him three wins and two seconds in five starts. Glenelg was generally considered the best three-year-old of 1869.

During his four-year-old season, he was the Older Male Champion. Early in the year, he ran third in the Westchester Cup and then was third again to Helmbold and Hamburg in the Saratoga Cup, but he later beat Helmbold in Maturity Stakes. He also won the Excelsior Stakes, Breakfast Stakes, and Bowie Stakes, which rounded off his four-year-old campaign. At age five, Glenelg started as favorite in the Westchester Cup but lost and came up lame after the race. Sent home to recuperate, he never raced again.

== Stud career ==
Despite Glenelg's slow start at racing, as a stallion he eventually ranked among the best in the country and dominated the West Coast. He was initially given little attention when he stood for August Belmont, who directed most of his focus to the more highly valued of his stallions, Kentucky. During his early years at stud, Glenelg performed poorly. He was later sold to Milton H. Sanford for $10,000 in a package deal along with two mares and improved his stud performance. After Glenelg was sold again to Daniel Swigert, he hit his stride and became the first horse since Lexington to dominate the sire list in consecutive years. While Glenelg mixed best with Lexington mares, his best runner was the Hall of Famer Firenze, out of a Virgil mare, who won Champion Female for four years (1887-1890).

== Pedigree ==
Pedigree of Glenelg, bay horse, 1866
Sire Citadel (GB)	Stockwell (GB)	The Baron (IRE)	Birdcatcher (IRE)
Sire Citadel (GB)	Stockwell (GB)	The Baron (IRE)	Echidna (IRE)
Sire Citadel (GB)	Stockwell (GB)	Pocahontas (GB)	*Glencoe
Sire Citadel (GB)	Stockwell (GB)	Pocahontas (GB)	Marpessa (GB)
Sire Citadel (GB)	Sortie (GB)	Melbourne (GB)	Humphry Clinker (GB)
Sire Citadel (GB)	Sortie (GB)	Melbourne (GB)	Cervantes Mare (GB)
Sire Citadel (GB)	Sortie (GB)	Escalade (GB)	Touchstone (GB)
Sire Citadel (GB)	Sortie (GB)	Escalade (GB)	Ghuznee (GB)
Dam Babta (GB)	Kingston (GB)	Venison (GB)	Partisan (GB)
Dam Babta (GB)	Kingston (GB)	Venison (GB)	Fawn (GB)
Dam Babta (GB)	Kingston (GB)	Queen Anne (GB)	Slane (GB)
Dam Babta (GB)	Kingston (GB)	Queen Anne (GB)	Garcia (GB)
Dam Babta (GB)	Alice Love (GB)	Defence (GB)	Whalebone (GB)
Dam Babta (GB)	Alice Love (GB)	Defence (GB)	Defiance (GB)
Dam Babta (GB)	Alice Love (GB)	Pet (GB)	Gainsbourough (GB)
Dam Babta (GB)	Alice Love (GB)	Pet (GB)	Topsy Turvy Mare (GB) (family 26)
