= Shirley (horse) =

American-bred Thoroughbred racehorse

- Sire: Lexington
- Grandsire: Boston
- Dam: Miss Carter
- Damsire: Sovereign
- Sex: Gelding
- Foaled: 1873
- Country: United States
- Colour: Bay
- Breeder: A. J. Alexander
- Owner: Pierre Lorillard IV
- Trainer: William Brown

Major wins
- American Classics wins: Preakness Stakes (1876)

Shirley was an American Thoroughbred racehorse. Ridden by future U. S. Racing Hall of Fame inductee George Barbee, Shirley won the 1876 Preakness Stakes.

== Background ==
Shirley was bred at Woodburn Stud by Alexander John Alexander. His father was the leading sire Lexington, and his dam was Miss Carter. Shirley was sold to Pierre Lorillard IV, and was trained by William Brown.

== Racing career ==
Ridden by jockey George Barbee, Shirley won the Preakness Stakes as a three-year-old.

== Pedigree ==
Pedigree of Shirley
Sire Lexington 1850	Boston 1833	Timoleon	Sir Archy
Sire Lexington 1850	Boston 1833	Timoleon	Saltram Mare
Sire Lexington 1850	Boston 1833	Sister to Tuckahoe	Balls Florizel
Sire Lexington 1850	Boston 1833	Sister to Tuckahoe	Alderman Mare
Sire Lexington 1850	Alice Carneal 1836	Sarpedeon	Emilius
Sire Lexington 1850	Alice Carneal 1836	Sarpedeon	Icaria
Sire Lexington 1850	Alice Carneal 1836	Rowena	Sumpter
Sire Lexington 1850	Alice Carneal 1836	Rowena	Lady Grey
Dam Miss Carter 1861	Sovereign 1836	Emilius	Orville
Dam Miss Carter 1861	Sovereign 1836	Emilius	Emily
Dam Miss Carter 1861	Sovereign 1836	Fleur-de-lis	Bourbon
Dam Miss Carter 1861	Sovereign 1836	Fleur-de-lis	Lady Rachel
Dam Miss Carter 1861	Dolly Carter 1854	Glencoe I	Sultan
Dam Miss Carter 1861	Dolly Carter 1854	Glencoe I	Trampoline
Dam Miss Carter 1861	Dolly Carter 1854	Mavis	Wagner
Dam Miss Carter 1861	Dolly Carter 1854	Mavis	Medoc Mare
