= Cloverbrook =

American-bred Thoroughbred racehorse

- Sire: Vauxhall
- Grandsire: Lexington
- Dam: Maudina
- Damsire: Australian
- Sex: Stallion
- Foaled: 1874
- Country: United States
- Colour: Chestnut
- Breeder: Edwin Augustus Clabaugh
- Owner: Edwin Augustus Clabaugh
- Trainer: Jeter Walden

Major wins
- Woodburn Stakes (1878) American Classics wins: Preakness Stakes (1877); Belmont Stakes (1877)
- Last updated on April 14, 2020

Cloverbrook was an American Thoroughbred racehorse that won the 1877 Preakness Stakes and Belmont Stakes, races that would become the second and third legs of the U.S. Triple Crown series.

Cloverbrook was the first horse to win the Preakness Stakes that had been bred and trained in Maryland. He was bred and raced by Edwin Augustus Clabaugh of Carroll County, Maryland and trained by Jeter Walden, a brother to Hall of Fame trainer R. Wyndham Walden.

== Pedigree ==
Pedigree of Cloverbrook, chestnut colt, 1874
Sire Vauxhall	Lexington	Boston	Timoleon
Sire Vauxhall	Lexington	Boston	Sister to Tuckahoe
Sire Vauxhall	Lexington	Alice Carneal	Sarpedon
Sire Vauxhall	Lexington	Alice Carneal	Rowena
Sire Vauxhall	Verona	Yorkshire	St. Nicholas
Sire Vauxhall	Verona	Yorkshire	Miss Rose
Sire Vauxhall	Verona	Britannia	Muley
Sire Vauxhall	Verona	Britannia	Nancy
Dam Maudina	Australian	West Australian	Melbourne
Dam Maudina	Australian	West Australian	Mowerina
Dam Maudina	Australian	Emilia	Young Emilius
Dam Maudina	Australian	Emilia	Persian
Dam Maudina	Maud	Stockwell	The Baron
Dam Maudina	Maud	Stockwell	Pocahontas
Dam Maudina	Maud	Countess of Albemarle	Lanercost
Dam Maudina	Maud	Countess of Albemarle	Velocipede mare (family: 15-d)
