= Sir Charles (horse) =

American racehorse

- Sire: Sir Archy
- Grandsire: *Diomed
- Dam: mare by Citizen
- Damsire: *Citizen
- Sex: Stallion
- Foaled: 1816
- Country: United States
- Color: Chestnut
- Breeder: James J. Harrison
- Owner: James J. Harrison
- Record: 26: 20-4-?

Awards
- Leading sire in North America (1830, 1831, 1832, 1833, 1836)

Sir Charles (foaled 1816) was an American Thoroughbred racehorse and an important sire in the early development of the breed in North America. In 1830, he became the first horse to earn the title of Leading sire in North America, followed by wins in 1831, 1832, 1833 and 1836.

== Background ==
Sir Charles was a chestnut stallion bred in Virginia by James J. Harrison and foaled at Harrison's Diamond Grove plantation in Brunswick County. He was sired by Sir Archy, who is generally regarded as the first great American-bred racehorse and sire. In addition to Sir Charles, Sir Archy sired Bertrand (who also became a leading sire) and Timoleon (the sire of Boston who in turn sired the great Lexington). Sir Archy was by Diomed, who won the first Epsom Derby in 1780 but had little success at stud in England. Imported into America in 1798 at the advanced age of 21, Diomed proved himself "utterly revolutionary" as a stallion in his new country. His sire line dominated the North American breeding lists through the 19th century.

Little is known about the dam of Sir Charles, a mare by Citizen. She is a member of American Family 19, which descends from Jenny Dismal, imported from England in 1756. Jenny Dismal is thought to descend from Sister to Leedes, though this is not documented in the English Stud Book.

== Racing career ==
Sir Charles won twenty times from twenty six starts, and finished second four times. He raced mainly in the heat races that were the fashion of the time, at distances ranging from two to four miles. In heat racing, a horse had to win two heats on the same day to be considered the winner of the race. If different horses won the first two heats, a third heat was required to determine the winner. His wins were broken down by distance as "four at four-mile heats, four of three-mile heats, six of two-mile heats, in six, distances not given."

Sir Charles' last race was his most famous, even though it was a loss. Sir Charles was considered the champion of the South and American Eclipse was the champion of the North. Harrison issued a challenge to the owner of Eclipse on September 30, 1822, referring to Sir Charles as "this Golden horse, that commanded the wind to stand still, and all creation to bend before him," while conceding that Eclipse was said to be a fine horse who "would be benefitted [sic] by southern fame". The two were set to race on November 22 at the Washington, D.C. course in the first of what became a series of North-South challenge races. Sir Charles "struck a tendon" the day before the race and Harrison had to pay a $5,000 forfeit. Harrison agreed to one heat, which American Eclipse then won with ease.

== Stud career ==
After retirement from racing, Sir Charles was purchased by Col. William Ransom Johnson of Chesterfield County, Virginia, who owned the Oaklands plantation on the Appomattox River. Sir Charles first stood at Oaklands and was later moved to a nearby stud owned by George W. Johnson, William Johnson's son. John Charles Craig purchased a half interest.

In 1830, Sir Charles headed the American sire list, compiled by pedigree consultant Anne Peters, in the first year for which specific data was available. Prior to 1830, the list was not broken down by year, and win totals were not available. In 1830, horses sired by Sir Charles won 38 races, with Bonnets o' Blue being his top earner. Sir Charles led the sire list four more times, in 1831 with 19 wins, 1832 with 43 wins, 1833 with 23 wins and 1836 with 28 wins. His best runners include Wagner (winner of 14 of 20 races), Bonnets O'Blue and Trifle.

Sir Charles' sire line persisted through Wagner until the end of the century, but he proved most influential through his daughters. Bonnets O'Blue produced Hall of Fame inductee Fashion, Rosalie Somers produced Revenue (who himself was a leading sire) and Charlotte Hamilton was an ancestor of the great Himyar.

Sir Charles died on June 7, 1833.

== Sire line tree ==
- Sir Charles
  - Collier
  - Andrew
    - Count Zaldivar
  - Frank
    - Jim Bell
  - Wagner
    - Oliver
    - Voucher
      - Whale
      - Rupee
        - Bill Tevis
        - Rupert McGregor
      - Restless
    - Monte
    - Cary Bell
    - Ashland
    - Charley Ball
    - Wagner Joe
    - Jack Gamble
      - Jack Gamble Jr
    - Red Jacket
    - Starke
      - Wissehrad
    - Endorser
      - Excel
    - Joe Stoner
    - Neil Robinson
    - Rynodyne
      - Blarnestone

== Pedigree ==
Pedigree of Sir Charles, chestnut, 1816
| Sire Sir Archy b. 1805 | *Diomed ch. 1777 | Florizel | Herod*^ |
| Sire Sir Archy b. 1805 | *Diomed ch. 1777 | Florizel | mare by Cygnet |
| Sire Sir Archy b. 1805 | *Diomed ch. 1777 | Sister to Juno | Spectator |
| Sire Sir Archy b. 1805 | *Diomed ch. 1777 | Sister to Juno | Horatia |
| Sire Sir Archy b. 1805 | *Castianira br. 1796 | Rockingham | Highflyer^ |
| Sire Sir Archy b. 1805 | *Castianira br. 1796 | Rockingham | Purity |
| Sire Sir Archy b. 1805 | *Castianira br. 1796 | Tabitha | Trentham |
| Sire Sir Archy b. 1805 | *Castianira br. 1796 | Tabitha | mare by Bosphorus |
| Dam mare by Citizen ch. 1810 | *Citizen b. 1785 | Pacolet | Blank |
| Dam mare by Citizen ch. 1810 | *Citizen b. 1785 | Pacolet | Whitneck |
| Dam mare by Citizen ch. 1810 | *Citizen b. 1785 | Princess | Turk |
| Dam mare by Citizen ch. 1810 | *Citizen b. 1785 | Princess | Fairy Queen |
| Dam mare by Citizen ch. 1810 | mare by Commutation; 1791 | Commutation | Symmes' Wildair |
| Dam mare by Citizen ch. 1810 | mare by Commutation; 1791 | Commutation | mare by *Yorick |
| Dam mare by Citizen ch. 1810 | mare by Commutation; 1791 | mare by Dare Devil | *Dare Devil |
| Dam mare by Citizen ch. 1810 | mare by Commutation; 1791 | mare by Dare Devil | Sally Shark (family A19) |

An asterisk before a horse's name means they were imported into America.

*^ Sir Charles is inbred 4S x 5S to the stallion Herod, meaning that he appears fourth and fifth generation (via Highflyer)^ once each on the sire side of his pedigree.
