= Timoleon (horse) =

American Thoroughbred racehorse

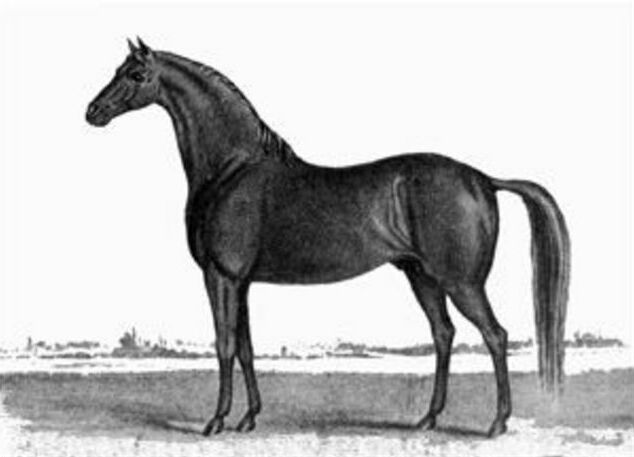
- Sire: Sir Archy
- Grandsire: Diomed
- Dam: Saltram mare (A24) (1801)
- Damsire: Saltram (GB)
- Sex: Stallion
- Foaled: 1813 or 1814
- Country: United States
- Colour: Chestnut
- Breeder: Benjamin Jones
- Owner: J.J. Harrison Colonel William Wynn; Robert R. Johnson Colonel David Dancy
- Record: about 15 starts for 13 wins, 2 seconds
- Last updated on 2 October 2010

Timoleon (foaled in either 1813 or 1814, depending on source*), was an American Thoroughbred racehorse and notable sire.

== Background ==
A chestnut horse whose only marking was a small white star and standing 15 hands 3 inches high, Timoleon was bred by Benjamin Jones in Greensfield County, Virginia. He was described as "a red sorrel, with a star in his forehead, and no other mark. His limbs are clean and hoofs firm and deep. He is very stout and of great length and remarkable for the proximity of his hips to the point of his shoulder. The bridge of his nose, though bony, is too large for elegance; and his ears, when pricked, are too near a horizontal position agreeable to the notion of beauty; but a better moth, nostril, trottle or eye can't be found on any animal of the species...His form, his appearance, nay, everything about him, evince that he is genuine." He was by one of America's greatest foundation stallions and a National Museum of Racing and Hall of Fame inductee, Sir Archy. Timoleon's dam was the Saltram mare (A24) (1801) by the imported British stallion, Saltram, from the Wildair mare (1795) by Syme's Wildair. In 1800, when Saltram was 20 years old he was imported to Virginia, then the heart of Thoroughbred breeding in the United States, by the Virginian "gentleman," William Lightfoot. Through this pedigree Timoleon combined the blood of the three Thoroughbred sirelines: Eclipse, Herod and Matchem.

== Racing record ==
At three, Timoleon was purchased by William Wynn of Petersburg, Virginia who seems to have regretted his purchase because Timoleon was rapidly sold on to Robert R. Johnson. Wynn then went through an immediate change of heart. Ten days after selling the horse, he offered to buy him back for a thousand dollars more than his selling price, saying he was, "...superior to any race horse that ever turned a gravel on any race course in the United States". Of his racing career at age three, it is known that he won the colt purse at Petersburg in straight heats, covering the mile in 1:47 and 1:48, distancing the field in the second heat. Earlier that same day, he had won a half mile match against a Potomac colt. Later that same year, he lost the Post Stake at Petersburg to Reality, winning the first heat in 3:46 before losing the next two "for want of strength in the rider."

Timoleon was the "Pride of Virginia." But racing so long ago, the actual statistics on his career on the track are hard to trace. It seems he might have started 15 times and that he won 13 of those starts, which were over the then-usual distances of three or four miles. It also seems he might have won all fifteen if he'd been entered in better form. Four of his wins were "walk-overs." In his day if a horse like Timoleon was scheduled to compete but no horse could be found to challenge him, then he (or she) would be allowed to canter the course, winning the purse and the race. It is certain he defeated some of the best horses of his time. He defeated the two best daughters of Sir Archy: Reality and Lady Lightfoot, who were both highly regarded. The only horses that ever beat him were the aforementioned Reality and the highly regarded mare Transport.

His final race took place in February 1818. He'd suffered with equine distemper (also called Strangles) a week before, was still entered, but had to be pulled up with respiratory problems, his second and last defeat.

== Stud record ==
Timoleon then stood briefly at stud at the farm of Johnson and Wynn's stables in North Carolina. In 1819 he was sold to Colonel David Dancy who took him first to General Hunter's plantation in Madison County, Alabama, and then, in 1829, to Nashville, Tennessee and one year later, to Charles City County, Virginia. He stood there for $50, compared to the $75 stud fee for Leviathan, then the most expensive stallion standing in America.

Timoleon proved to be a good sire, even if only by producing Boston who sired the outstanding sire Lexington. He also sired:

- Sally Walker, his best filly, was considered one of the best in her day
- Washington who defeated the great Henry
- Hotspur, a notable four-mile horse

He was also an influential sire in the development of the American Quarter Horse breed, as one of his descendants was American Quarter Horse foundation sire Steel Dust.

He died in 1836, at the age of 23 years.

== Sire line tree ==
Timoleon descendants (click to expand)
- Timoleon
  - Washington
  - Marquis
  - Sir John Falstaff
  - Hotspur
  - Jackson
  - Boston
    - Arlington
    - Cost Johnson
    - Ringgold
      - Woodford
      - Ringmaster
      - Tipperary
        - Aaron Pennington
        - Calvin
    - Commodore
      - Gen Rosseau
    - Red Eye
    - Cracker
      - Billy Cheatham
      - Bruce
    - Big Boston
    - Jack Hawkins
      - Odd Fellow
    - Arrow
    - Bob Johnson
    - Wade Hampton
    - Lecomte
      - Sherrod
      - Umpire
        - Not Out
        - Decider
    - Piketon
    - Zero
      - Judge Leonard
    - Lexington
      - Daniel Boone
        - Cottrill
      - Goodwood
      - Colton
        - Monday
      - Lightning
        - D'Artagnan
      - Optomist
        - Mars
        - Osman
      - Uncle Vic
        - Victory
        - Harry Edwards
        - Uncle Tom
      - Bulletin
      - Jack Malone
        - Chickamauga
        - Muggins
        - Camargo
        - Damon
        - Bazar
      - Lexington (Embry)
      - Thunder
      - Avalanche
      - Censor
      - Frank Boston
      - Harper
        - Bay Jack
      - Jim Sherwood
        - Dan Heaney
      - Lexington (Hunter)
        - Joe Johnson
        - Judge Wickliffe
      - War Dance
        - Ramadan
        - Wheatly
        - St George
        - Big Fellow
        - Monmouth
        - Stampede
        - Bullion
        - Chance
      - Union Jack
      - Copec
      - Rogers
      - Asteroid
        - George Wilkes
        - Harvey Villain
        - Aerolite
        - Artist
        - Asteroid
        - Astral
        - Ballinkeel
        - Ceylon
        - Creedmore
      - Beacon
      - Chesapeake
      - Cincinnati
      - Donerail
      - Kentucky
        - Silk Stocking
        - Scratch
        - Bertram
      - Loadstone
      - Norfolk
        - Norfall
        - Bradley
        - Flood
        - Duke of Norfolk
        - Prince of Norfolk
        - Alta
        - Estil
        - Emperor of Norfolk
        - The Czar
        - El Rio Rey
      - Ulverston
        - Keene Richards
      - Woodburn
        - Hardwood
      - Ansel
      - Bay Dick
      - Gilroy
        - Grinstead
        - John M Clay
      - Harry of the West
      - Luther
        - Sharpcatcher
      - Veto
      - Edinborough
      - Jonesboro
      - King Lear
      - Lee Paul
      - Lever
        - Leveller
        - Apollo
      - Merrill
      - Norway
      - Red Dick
      - Watson
      - Baywood
      - Concord
        - Galway
      - King Tom
        - King George
      - Marion
        - Logan
      - Newry
      - Bayonet
      - Crossland
      - General Duke
        - Bonnie Duke
      - Hazard
      - Paris
      - Pat Malloy
        - Ozark
        - Lord Murphy
        - Blue Grass
        - Bob Miles
        - Favor
      - Vauxhall
        - Viator
        - Cloverbrook
      - Barney Willams
      - Chillecothe
      - Foster
        - Jim Brown
      - Kingfisher
        - Turco
        - Prince Royal
      - Pilgrim
      - Preakness
        - Fiddler
      - Creole Dance
      - Harry Bassett
        - George McCullough
        - King Nero
      - Monarchist
        - Longfield
        - Storey
        - Monarch
        - Loftin
      - Pimlico
      - Wanderer
      - Tom Bowling
        - Black Prince
        - General Monroe
        - Sligo
        - Tacoma
      - Acrobat
      - Breathitt
        - Melikoff
      - Jack Boston
      - King Bolt
      - Tom Ochiltree
        - Tattler
        - Cynosure
        - Major Domo
        - Sluggard
      - Charley Howard
      - Fiddlesticks
      - Shirley
      - Brown Prince
        - Shillelagh
        - Kilsallaghan
      - Frederick the Great
      - Duke of Magenta
        - Leo
        - Young Duke
        - Duke of Kent
        - Eric
      - Uncas
        - Dunboyne
        - Oneko
        - Sorcerer
        - Fake

== Pedigree ==
Pedigree of Timoleon, chestnut stallion, 1813
Sire Sir Archy 1805	Diomed; 1777	Florizel	Herod
Sire Sir Archy 1805	Diomed; 1777	Florizel	Cygnet mare
Sire Sir Archy 1805	Diomed; 1777	Sister to Juno	Spectator
Sire Sir Archy 1805	Diomed; 1777	Sister to Juno	Horatia
Sire Sir Archy 1805	Castianira; 1796	Rockingham	Highflyer
Sire Sir Archy 1805	Castianira; 1796	Rockingham	Purity
Sire Sir Archy 1805	Castianira; 1796	Tabitha	Trentham
Sire Sir Archy 1805	Castianira; 1796	Tabitha	Bosphorus mare
Dam Saltram mare 1801	Saltram; 1780	Eclipse	Marske
Dam Saltram mare 1801	Saltram; 1780	Eclipse	Spilleta
Dam Saltram mare 1801	Saltram; 1780	Virago	Snap
Dam Saltram mare 1801	Saltram; 1780	Virago	Regulus Mare
Dam Saltram mare 1801	Wildair mare 1794	Wildair	Fearnaught
Dam Saltram mare 1801	Wildair mare 1794	Wildair	Kitty Fisher
Dam Saltram mare 1801	Wildair mare 1794	Driver Mare	Driver
Dam Saltram mare 1801	Wildair mare 1794	Driver Mare	Fallower mare

== See also ==
- List of leading Thoroughbred racehorses
