= Florizel =

British Thoroughbred racehorse

- Sire: Herod
- Grandsire: Tartar
- Dam: Cygnet mare
- Damsire: Cygnet
- Sex: Stallion
- Foaled: 1768
- Died: 1791 (aged 22–23)
- Country: Great Britain
- Colour: Bay
- Breeder: Sir John Moore
- Owner: Christopher Blake; Richard Vernon
- Record: 23: 16-?-?
- Last updated on 26 August 2007

Florizel (1768–1791) was a British Thoroughbred racehorse. He was a bay son of Herod foaled in 1768.

As a sire, he produced 175 winners who won a total of 75,901 pounds. Offspring included Eager (winner of the 1791 Derby), Tartar (St. Leger), Ninety-three (St. Leger), Brilliant, Diomed (winner of the Derby and a great sire in the US, producing Sir Archy), Ulysses, Moustrap, and Admiral. Important daughters included Leveret (dam of Lilliput), Fancy (dam of Rattle), Lucy (dam of Skylark), and the dam of Clifden.

Florizel died in 1791. 'Florizel' is on the permanent list, of The International List of Protected Names. Lester Piggott, retired jockey, named his house 'Florizel'.

== Sire line tree ==
- Florizel
  - Moustrap
  - Crookshanks
  - Ulysses
    - Play or Pay
  - King William
  - Admiral
  - Fortunio
    - King Bladud
    - Prince Frederick
  - Fidget
    - Fidget Colt
  - Brilliant
  - Bustler
  - Prizefighter
    - Swordsman
      - Spartacus
    - Buffer
      - Lenox
      - Abundance
      - The Curragh Guide
      - Master Robert
        - Skeleton
        - Drone
        - Regulator
        - Bags
        - Rust
          - Polish
  - Florizel
  - Eager
  - Slapbang
  - Tartar
  - Ninety-three
  - Diomed
    - Grey Diomed
    - Glaucus
    - Anthony
    - Cedar
    - Greyhound
    - Wrangler
    - Poplar
    - Albemarle
    - Peacemaker
    - Top Gallant
    - Truxton
    - Wonder
      - Tennessee Oscar
    - Florizel (Ball)
    - Vingt'un
    - Stump-the-Dealer
    - Potomac
      - Little John
    - Sir Archy
      - Cicero
      - Sir Arthur
      - Director
        - Aratus
      - Grey Archy
      - Spring Hill
      - Tecumseh
      - Young Sir Archy
      - Columbus
      - Reap Hook
      - Warbler
      - Walk-In-The-Water
      - Timoleon
        - Washington
        - Marquis
        - Sir John Falstaff
        - Hotspur
        - Jackson
        - Boston
      - Lawrence
      - Carolinian
      - Contention
      - Kosciusko
        - Pulaski
        - Clermont
        - Woodford
        - Romulus
        - Greybeard
      - Napoleon
      - Virginian
        - Byron
        - Mercury
        - Sidi Hamet
      - Sir Solomon
      - Rattler
        - Marylander
      - Sir Charles
        - Collier
        - Andrew
        - Frank
        - Wagner
      - Sir William
      - Childers
      - Roanoke
        - Grey Beard
        - John Hancock
      - Muckle John
      - Sumpter
        - Almanzor
        - Brunswick
      - Henry
        - Robin Hood
        - Gerow
      - John Richards
        - Corsica
      - Stockholder
        - Pumpkin Boy
      - Arab
        - Union
      - Bertrand
        - McDonough
        - Richard Singleton
        - Woodpecker
        - Bertrand Jr
        - John Bascombe
        - Arbaces
        - Gauglion Gangle
      - Cherokee
        - Whalebone
      - Marion
        - Cymon
        - John Blount
      - Phoenomenon
      - Sir Richard
      - Sir William of Transport
        - Sir Leslie
        - Plato
      - Janus
      - Rinaldo
      - Robin Adair
      - Gohanna
      - Occupant
        - Waxy
      - Pacific
        - Epsilon
      - Saxe Weimer
      - Crusader
      - Pirate
      - Sir Archy Montorio
        - Rodolph
      - Giles Scroggins
      - Industry
        - Goldboy
      - Merlin
      - Red Gauntlet
      - Tariff
      - Hyazim
      - Wild Bill
        - Gandor
      - Copperbottom
        - Rock
      - Longwaist
      - Zinganee
        - George Martin
    - Duroc
      - Sir Lovell
      - Trouble
      - Marshal Duroc
        - Marshall Bertrand
      - American Eclipse
        - Lance
        - Eclipse (Monmouth)
        - Goliah
        - Medoc
        - Shark
        - Mingo
        - Paul Clifford
        - Forward
        - Gano
        - Ten Broeck
        - Zenith
        - Eclipse (Brawner)
      - Cock of the Rock
      - Romp
      - Messenger Duroc
      - American Star (Stockholm)
        - American Star 14 (Seely)
    - Hampton

== Pedigree ==
Pedigree of Florizel, bay stallion, 1768
Sire Herod 1758	Tartar; 1743	Partner (Old); 1718	Jigg
Sire Herod 1758	Tartar; 1743	Partner (Old); 1718	Sister One To Mixbury
Sire Herod 1758	Tartar; 1743	Meliora 1729	Fox
Sire Herod 1758	Tartar; 1743	Meliora 1729	Milkmaid
Sire Herod 1758	Cypron; 1750	Blaze; 1733	Flying Childers*
Sire Herod 1758	Cypron; 1750	Blaze; 1733	Confederate Filly
Sire Herod 1758	Cypron; 1750	Salome; 1733	Bethel's Arabian
Sire Herod 1758	Cypron; 1750	Salome; 1733	Champion mare
Dam Cygnet mare 1761	Cygnet; 1753	Godolphin Arabian; 1724	(unknown)
Dam Cygnet mare 1761	Cygnet; 1753	Godolphin Arabian; 1724	(unknown)
Dam Cygnet mare 1761	Cygnet; 1753	Blossum c. 1742	Crab
Dam Cygnet mare 1761	Cygnet; 1753	Blossum c. 1742	Sister Three to Steady
Dam Cygnet mare 1761	Young Cartouch mare 1750	Young Cartouch; 1731	Cartouch
Dam Cygnet mare 1761	Young Cartouch mare 1750	Young Cartouch; 1731	Sister to Red Rose
Dam Cygnet mare 1761	Young Cartouch mare 1750	Ebony 1728	Flying Childers*
Dam Cygnet mare 1761	Young Cartouch mare 1750	Ebony 1728	Old Ebony

* Florizel is inbred 4S x 4D to the stallion Flying Childers, meaning that he appears fourth generation on the sire side of his pedigree and fourth generation on the dam side of his pedigree.
