= Wallace's Monthly =

- First issue: Oct 1875
- Final issue: February 1894 (Vol. 19, No. 12)
- Country: United States
- Language: English

Wallace's Monthly was an American sporting magazine founded by John H. Wallace (1822–1903) and published out of New York from 1875–1894. It was dedicated to the coverage of horse racing.

The publication debuted in October 1875 with Wallace as editor and Benjamin Singerly as publisher. After Singerly's death in 1876, Wallace also became publisher. In 1891, Wallace sold the publication to the American Trotting Registration Association.
