= Boston (horse) =

American-bred Thoroughbred racehorse

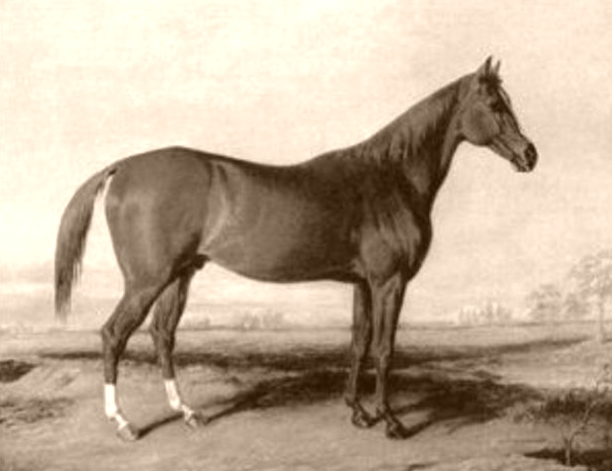
- Boston, from the painting by Edward Troye
- Sire: Timoleon
- Grandsire: Sir Archy
- Dam: Sister to Tuckahoe
- Damsire: Ball’s Florizel
- Sex: Stallion
- Foaled: 1833
- Died: January 31, 1850 (aged 16 or 17)
- Country: United States
- Colour: Chestnut
- Breeder: John Wickham
- Owner: Nathaniel Rives, 2. Col. William R. Johnson & James Long
- Trainer: Capt. John Blecher; 2. Arthur Taylor
- Record: 45: 40-2-1
- Earnings: $51,700

Honours
- United States Racing Hall of Fame inductee (1955)

Boston (1833–1850) was an outstanding Thoroughbred racehorse and a leading sire in North America three times from 1851 to 1853. He started in about 45 races, winning 40, including 15 in succession. Boston was later one of the initial inductees into the Hall of Fame.

== Breeding ==
He was a chestnut stallion with a white blaze on his nose, and he was foaled in Richmond, Virginia. Boston was bred by Virginia attorney John Wickham (who had been Aaron Burr's counsel in his trial for treason). He was by Timoleon (by the Sir Archy); his dam was a sister to Tuckahoe, by Ball's Florizel. Boston was inbred to Diomed in the third generation (3m x 3f). He was a half-brother to the Shylock mare who founded a successful family. They were from the number 40 family, which traced back to the imported mare Kitty Fisher.

Boston was described as "[A] glowing chestnut, with a blazed face and both hind ankles white; his coat being lustrous and satiny in texture. While well-shaped, the expression of his head and neck were such that they were often though coarse and ugly, which actually they were not. The eye was large and full, the ear small and well-placed and carried, the nostril flaring. His neck was of medium length and very clean at the throttle. He rose high on the withers, was deep-breasted and the shoulders obliquely laid. For a horse of his height his carcass was immense. He was slab-sided, flat-bodied and stood over a lot of ground, his back-ribs were wonderful and coupling arched with the power of suspension bridge, while his entire hind quarter was a prodigy of brawn and muscle. Boston was a heavy limbed horse, with knees and hocks let down close the ground and unusually short pasterns that were at the same time extremely flexible. No set of measurements seems ever to have been taken of him, but his forearm was abnormal in its size, as were his stifle and gaskin, his length from point of hip to point of hock superior to any other celebrity since American Eclipse. His fiery temperament alternately flamed and smouldered and from moods of passion he would lapse into inert, sluggish ones, but at all times he had the quickness of a cat when aroused which made his gigantic strength all the more formidable. Led out he usually dropped his head almost on a level with his withers; and at the beginning of a heat carried it so low that he seemed to stretch himself along the ground, but as the miles were put behind him and the climax came, would gradually lift it higher and higher and finish 'looking for horses.'"

As a two-year-old, Boston was lost by his breeder in a card game and was given to Wickham's friend Nathaniel Rives of Richmond to repay his debt of $800. He was named after a popular card game and later given the nickname of "Old Whitenose". Boston had a wilful temperament and was difficult to train. He was sent to the stable of John Belcher, and then to the trainer L. White, and then back to Belcher. White said, "The horse should either be castrated or shot—preferably the latter."

== Racing record ==
On April 20, 1836, he was entered into a sweepstakes in Richmond facing only a colt of White's. Boston ran away with the race, gaining a long lead, only to stop halfway through, refusing to move. His rider dismounted and a heavier one, named Ned, mounted, who eventually got Boston moving again, but the other colt had crossed the wire and won while Boston was still balking on the back stretch.

After this race, Boston was given to Ned to use as a common hack in Richmond with an iron hand. Boston's temperament caused multiple wild scenes, but afterwards he was more amenable to a rider.

Back under saddle, Boston won fifteen races in succession. From Georgia to New York, he raced until he was a ten-year-old, winning 40 of his 45 starts. In those days, races weren't stakes, graded or otherwise, and they weren't run on specially prepared racecourses. They were heats across open country and 30 of Boston's victories were in these four-miles heats, while another 9 wins were in three-mile heats. Boston had established himself as a great—if tempestuous—race horse and more than once, his then owner (Colonel W. R. Johnson, called the "Napoleon of the Turf") was paid good money not to race, in order to encourage other owners to enter their horses in an event.

=== Boston versus Fashion Match Race ===
The accepted wisdom is that Boston lost on his merit only once. In May 1842, he met the filly Fashion, the daughter of Trustee and Bonnets o' Blue, in a well-touted match race at the Union Course on Long Island, New York. Seventy thousand people witnessed the event. In the first heat, the nine-year-old Boston (carrying 126 pounds) cut open a long, jagged gash on his hip against a rail, and both he and five-year-old Fashion (carrying 111 pounds) were upset by the crowd often surging onto the track. Boston led for three miles, but Fashion won by 60 yards, setting a new world record of 7:32½ for a four-mile heat. During the match he twice tried to savage Fashion.

=== Complete race record ===
Date	Location	Distance	Race	Finish	Earnings
April 20, 1836	Broad Rock, VA	Mile heats	Sweepstakes	Distanced	$0
October 12, 1836	Petersburg, VA	2 mile heats	Purse	1st	$300
November 3, 1836	Hanover C. H., VA	3 mile heats	Purse	1st	$400
May 4, 1837	Washington, D.C.	3 mile heats	Purse	1st	$500
October 5, 1837	Washington, D.C.	3 mile heats	Purse	1st	$500
October 19, 1837	Baltimore, MD	3 mile heats	Purse	1st	$500
October 26, 1837	Camden, NJ	3 mile heats	Purse	1st	$500
May 3, 1838	Union Course, NY	3 mile heats	Purse	1st	$500
May 18, 1838	Beacon Course, NJ	4 mile heats	Purse	1st	$1,000
May 25, 1838	Camden, NJ	4 mile heats	Purse	1st	$1,000
June 1, 1838	Union Course, NY	4 mile heats	Purse	1st	$1,000
June 8 1838	Beacon Course, NJ	4 mile heats	Purse	1st	$1,000
October 4, 1838	Petersburg, VA	4 miles heats	Purse	1st	$700
October 13, 1838	Baltimore, MD	4 mile heats	Purse	1st	$700
October 19, 1838	Baltimore, MD	4 mile heats	Purse	Walked over	$500
October 27, 1838	Camden, NJ	4 mile heats	Purse	Walked over	$500
November 2, 1838	Union Course, NY	4 mile heats	Purse	1st	$1,000
November 9, 1838	Beacon Course, NJ	4 mile heats	Purse	1st	$1,000
April 16, 1839	Petersburg, VA	2 mile heats	Match	2nd	$0
April 27, 1839	Broad Rock, VA	3 mile heats	Purse	1st	$500
May 9, 1839	Washington, D. C.	4 mile heats	Purse	1st	$800
May 24, 1839	Camden, NJ	4 mile heats	Purse	1st	$1,000
May 31, 1839	Trenton, NJ	4 mile heats	Purse	1st	$1,000
June 7, 1839	Union Course, NY	4 mile heats	Purse	1st	$1,000
September 26, 1839	Petersburg, VA	4 mile heats	Stake	1st	$7,000
October 17, 1839	Camden, NJ	4 mile heats	Stake	1st	$7,000
October 23, 1839	Trenton, NJ	4 mile heats	Purse	1st	$1,000
May 1, 1840	Petersburg, VA	4 mile heats	Purse	1st	$700
May 8, 1840	Washington, D.C.	4 mile heats	Purse	1st	$1,000
May 22, 1840	Camden, NJ	4 mile heats	Purse	Walked over	$1,000
October 2, 1840	Petersburg, VA	4 mile heats	Purse	1st	$700
October 8, 1840	Broad Rock, VA	3 mile heats	Purse	1st	$500
December 7, 1840	Augusta, GA	4 mile heats	Match	1st	$10,000
December 17, 1840	Augusta, GA	4 mile heats	Purse	1st	$8,000
September 30, 1841	Petersburg, VA	4 mile heats	Purse	1st	$700
October 8, 1841	Alexandria, VA	4 mile heats	Purse	1st	$800
October 15, 1841	Washington D.C.	4 mile heats	Purse	1st	$800
October 21, 1841	Baltimore, MD	4 mile heats	Purse	1st	$600
October 28, 1841	Camden, NJ	4 mile heats	Purse	Distanced	$0
May 10, 1842	Union Course, NY	4 mile heats	Match	2nd	$0
May 13, 1842	Union Course, NY	4 mile heats	Purse	1st	$1,000
May 26, 1842	Camden, NJ	4 mile heats	Purse	1st	$800
October 6, 1842	Alexandria, VA	4 mile heats	Purse	3rd	$0
October 21, 1842	Baltimore, MD	4 mile heats	Purse	1st	$600
September 28, 1843	Petersburg, VA	4 mile heats	Purse	1st	$800

== Stud record ==
Boston was the leading sire in 1851, 1852 and 1853, and second in 1854 to Glencoe, beginning his stud career even before he raced against Fashion. (He'd covered 42 mares before the match at $100 each.) During his race career he stood at the stable of W. R. Johnson, in Petersburg, VA. He stood at Spring Grove, Hanover County, Virginia for $70 in 1843, then in Washington, D.C. for $60 in 1844, 1845, and 1846, and was then led over the mountains to Kentucky where he spent his last seasons in Woodford County, Kentucky, standing for $50 in 1847-1849. He thus stood only eight full season. It was in Kentucky that he was finally bred with mares of good quality, which enabled him to become a leading sire. His first progeny first raced in 1845 as three-year-olds. He was also a sire of trotters, producing Jay-Eye-See, the first trotter to reach 2:10 for a mile.

Boston eventually sired 95 winners of 293 races, including 26 at 4-mile heats and 61 at 3-mile heats. Some of Boston’s noted progeny were:

- Ringgold, an outstanding galloper and sire of Tipperary (sire of Belmont Stakes winner Calvin)
- Commodore, who became a good sire
- Attila, winner of five races in California and Oregon in 1860 and 17 over his career
- Red Eye, winner of 33 races, 11 at 4-mile heats and 13 at 3-mile heats
- Bostona, winner of 12 races, 2 at 4-mile heats and 6 at 3-mile heats, a noted racemare
- Arrow, winner of 10 races
- Wade Hampton, winner of 12 races
- Nina, an outstanding racehorse at distances from two to four miles and a notable broodmare. dam of Planet, Exchequer, Algerine, Ecliptic, Ninette, etc.
- Madeline, dam of Maggie B. B., who produced three American classic winners: Iroquois, Panique and Harold
- Lexington, foaled in 1850 after Boston's death. He was the greatest American racehorse of his era and became the leading sire for 16 years. Lexington maintained Boston's sire-line through Norfolk 1861—Emperor Of Norfolk 1885—Americus 1892 to Golden Rod (GB) 1906. Lexington's offspring captured a record seven Classic races as well as a nine Travers Stakes races.
- Lecomte, won 16 races and was the only horse to ever beat Lexington

By 1849, Boston was blind and in such poor health he could stand only with the aid of a harness. He was found dead in his stall, still warm, on January 31, 1850, blind and emaciated from illness. The stall and his body were splattered with blood, presumably from thrashing in his final moments. His two best sons, Lexington and Lecomte, were born in the spring after his death.

Boston was one of the first groups of horses inducted into the National Museum of Racing and Hall of Fame in 1955.

== Sire line tree ==
Boston descendants (click to expand)
- Boston
  - Arlington
  - Cost Johnson
  - Ringgold
    - Woodford
    - Ringmaster
    - Tipperary
      - Aaron Pennington
      - Calvin
  - Commodore
    - Gen Rosseau
  - Red Eye
  - Cracker
    - Billy Cheatham
    - Bruce
  - Big Boston
  - Jack Hawkins
    - Odd Fellow
  - Arrow
  - Bob Johnson
  - Wade Hampton
  - Lecomte
    - Sherrod
    - Umpire
      - Not Out
      - Decider
        - Wild Man From Borneo
  - Piketon
  - Zero
    - Judge Leonard
  - Lexington
    - Daniel Boone
      - Cottrill
    - Goodwood
    - Colton
      - Monday
        - Joe Hooker
        - Shannon
        - California
        - Mark L
        - Argyle
        - Duke of Monday
        - Guardsman
        - Peel
    - Lightning
      - D'Artagnan
    - Optomist
      - Mars
        - Jongleur
        - Promethee
      - Osman
    - Uncle Vic
      - Victory
      - Harry Edwards
      - Uncle Tom
    - Bulletin
    - Jack Malone
      - Chickamauga
      - Muggins
      - Camargo
      - Damon
      - Bazar
    - Lexington (Embry)
    - Thunder
    - Avalanche
    - Censor
    - Frank Boston
    - Harper
      - Bay Jack
    - Jim Sherwood
      - Dan Heaney
    - Lexington (Hunter)
      - Joe Johnson
      - Judge Wickliffe
    - War Dance
      - Ramadan
        - Judge Arnett
      - Wheatly
      - St George
      - Big Fellow
      - Monmouth
      - Stampede
      - Bullion
      - Chance
    - Union Jack
    - Copec
    - Rogers
    - Asteroid
      - George Wilkes
      - Harvey Villain
      - Aerolite
      - Artist
      - Asteroid
      - Astral
      - Ballinkeel
        - Blarney
      - Ceylon
      - Creedmore
    - Beacon
    - Chesapeake
    - Cincinnati
    - Donerail
    - Kentucky
      - Silk Stocking
      - Scratch
      - Bertram
    - Loadstone
    - Norfolk
      - Norfall
      - Bradley
      - Flood
      - Duke of Norfolk
      - Prince of Norfolk
      - Alta
      - Estil
      - Emperor of Norfolk
        - Americus
        - Norford
        - Cruzados
        - Norito
      - The Czar
      - El Rio Rey
        - Scarborough
        - Bonus Res
    - Ulverston
      - Keene Richards
    - Woodburn
      - Hardwood
    - Ansel
    - Bay Dick
    - Gilroy
      - Grinstead
        - Gano
        - Volante
        - Silver Cloud
        - Clio
        - Santiago
      - John M Clay
    - Harry of the West
    - Luther
      - Sharpcatcher
    - Veto
    - Edinborough
    - Jonesboro
    - King Lear
    - Lee Paul
    - Lever
      - Leveller
      - Apollo
    - Merrill
    - Norway
    - Red Dick
    - Watson
    - Baywood
    - Concord
      - Galway
    - King Tom
      - King George
    - Marion
      - Logan
    - Newry
    - Bayonet
    - Crossland
    - General Duke
      - Bonnie Duke
    - Hazard
    - Paris
    - Pat Malloy
      - Ozark
      - Lord Murphy
      - Blue Grass
      - Bob Miles
        - Manuel
      - Favor
    - Vauxhall
      - Viator
      - Cloverbrook
    - Barney Willams
    - Chillecothe
    - Foster
      - Jim Brown
    - Kingfisher
      - Turco
      - Prince Royal
        - Yankee Doodle
        - The Mighty
    - Pilgrim
    - Preakness
      - Fiddler
        - Jummy
    - Creole Dance
    - Harry Bassett
      - George McCullough
      - King Nero
    - Monarchist
      - Longfield
      - Storey
        - Fib
      - Monarch
      - Loftin
    - Pimlico
    - Wanderer
    - Tom Bowling
      - Black Prince
      - General Monroe
      - Sligo
      - Tacoma
    - Acrobat
    - Breathitt
      - Melikoff
    - Jack Boston
    - King Bolt
    - Tom Ochiltree
      - Tattler
      - Cynosure
      - Major Domo
      - Sluggard
    - Charley Howard
    - Fiddlesticks
    - Shirley
    - Brown Prince
      - Shillelagh
      - Kilsallaghan
    - Frederick the Great
    - Duke of Magenta
      - Leo
      - Young Duke
      - Duke of Kent
      - Eric
    - Uncas
      - Dunboyne
      - Oneko
      - Sorcerer
      - Fake

== Pedigree ==
Pedigree of Boston, chestnut stallion, foaled 1833
Sire Timoleon ch. 1813/1814	Sir Archy br. 1805	Diomed*	Florizel*
Sire Timoleon ch. 1813/1814	Sir Archy br. 1805	Diomed*	Sister to Juno*
Sire Timoleon ch. 1813/1814	Sir Archy br. 1805	Castianira	Rockingham
Sire Timoleon ch. 1813/1814	Sir Archy br. 1805	Castianira	Tabitha
Sire Timoleon ch. 1813/1814	Saltram mare br. 1801	Saltram	Eclipse
Sire Timoleon ch. 1813/1814	Saltram mare br. 1801	Saltram	Virago
Sire Timoleon ch. 1813/1814	Saltram mare br. 1801	Wildair mare	Symmes' Wildair
Sire Timoleon ch. 1813/1814	Saltram mare br. 1801	Wildair mare	Driver mare
Dam Sister to Tuckahoe ch. 1814	Ball's Florizel ch. 1801	Diomed*	Florizel*
Dam Sister to Tuckahoe ch. 1814	Ball's Florizel ch. 1801	Diomed*	Sister to Juno*
Dam Sister to Tuckahoe ch. 1814	Ball's Florizel ch. 1801	Shark mare	Shark
Dam Sister to Tuckahoe ch. 1814	Ball's Florizel ch. 1801	Shark mare	Eclipse mare
Dam Sister to Tuckahoe ch. 1814	Alderman mare b. 1799	Alderman	Potoooooooo
Dam Sister to Tuckahoe ch. 1814	Alderman mare b. 1799	Alderman	Lady Bolingbroke
Dam Sister to Tuckahoe ch. 1814	Alderman mare b. 1799	Clockfast mare	Clockfast
Dam Sister to Tuckahoe ch. 1814	Alderman mare b. 1799	Clockfast mare	Wildair mare (Family 40)

* Boston is inbred 3S x 3D to the stallion Diomed, meaning that he appears third generation on the sire side of his pedigree and third generation on the dam side of his pedigree.

== See also ==
- List of leading Thoroughbred racehorses
