= Diomed =

British Thoroughbred racehorse

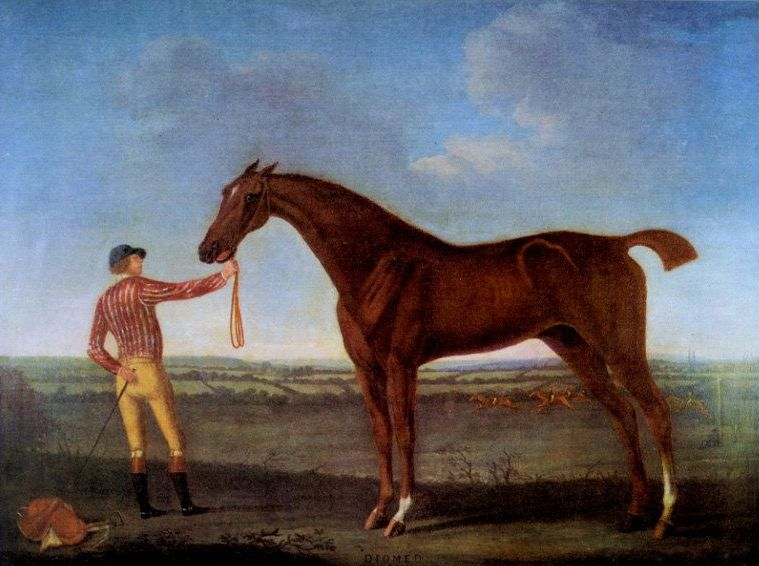
- Diomed "the Marvel"
- Sire: Florizel
- Grandsire: Herod
- Dam: Mare (1763) by Spectator
- Damsire: Spectator
- Sex: Stallion
- Foaled: 1777
- Died: 1808 (aged 30–31)
- Country: Kingdom of Great Britain
- Colour: Chestnut
- Breeder: Honorable Richard Vernon of Newmarket
- Owner: Sir Charles Bunbury, 6th Baronet
- Record: 20: 11-5-3

Major wins
- Epsom Derby (1780)

Honours
- Diomed Stakes at Epsom Downs Racecourse
- Last updated on August 24, 2007

Diomed (1777–1808) was an English Thoroughbred race horse who won the inaugural running of the Epsom Derby in 1780. Sold and imported to Virginia, he was subsequently a successful sire in the United States after the American Revolutionary War.

== Racing years ==
A bright chestnut standing 15 hands (60 inches, 152 cm), he was named after the Ancient Greek hero Diomedes. By the unraced Florizel out of the unraced Pastorella's Dam, also known as "Sister to Juno" (both going back to the Godolphin Arabian, and Sister to Juno going back as well to the Darley Arabian), Diomed was bred by the Hon. Richard Vernon and owned by Sir Charles Bunbury, 6th Baronet, then trained by him at Hilton Hall. He was started 19 times, winning 11 races, finishing second in 4, and third in 3.

Of these 11 wins, ten were consecutive, which included the inaugural running of the Epsom Derby in 1780. During these early bright years of Diomed's life, he was considered by many to be the best colt seen in the Britain since Eclipse in 1769 and 1770.

He was allowed to rest for a while, but when he was brought back to the races, he had mixed results. Sometimes he would win, and sometimes he wouldn't win, more often the latter than the former. His last win was a King's Plate in 4-mile heats, carrying 168 pounds.

== Stud career in England ==
Sir Charles retired Diomed to stud in 1784. Due to Diomed's tarnished reputation, his fee was only about five guineas, or about $25.

In England, Diomed sired Grey Diomed (b. 1785), a gray stallion out of the mare Grey Dorimant, by Dorimant (b. 1772) either of the Darley Arabian sire line or the St. Victor Barb sire line. Grey Diomed was exported to Russia, where he was a great success, and more Diomed offspring were exported to Russia, where some were likely used as foundation stock for the Orlov Trotter.

Diomed also sired the mare Young Giantess (b. 1790), who foaled Sorcerer and Eleanor, also owned by Sir Charles. Young Giantess also produced two sisters to Eleanor, Julia and Cressida, who produced the Epsom Derby winners Priam and Phantom, as well as the 2000 Guineas winner Antar.

Diomed also sired the notable broodmares Young Noisette (b. 1789), who produced the stallion Marmion (b. 1806), and Fanny (b. 1790).

Over the next decade or so, interest in Diomed as a sire declined, as several of his sons became known for having temperament problems, stubbornness, and too much excitability. Diomed's fertility as a sire also began to decline as he aged. Diomed's fee went down and down until, by the age of 21, it was two guineas. By then, there were virtually no takers, so the old stallion did nothing but graze alone.

== In the United States ==
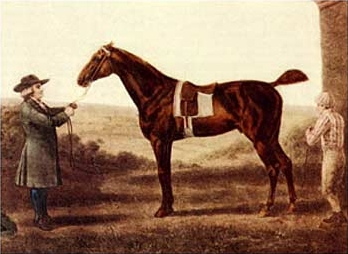
Diomed

Sir Charles offered Diomed for sale when the stallion was 21 years old. Colonel John Hoomes of Bowling Green, Virginia bought him for $250, and then shipped him to Virginia, where he was returned to stud in 1798. Aside from importing bloodstock into the United States, Hoomes also maintained his own racing stable and stud service in which his good friend, the leading national horseman of the time, John Tayloe III, was a partner. Although Hoomes and Tayloe's English agent wrote Hoomes a letter stating very clearly that Diomed was "...a tried and true bad foal-getter", and strongly recommending he not be put to stud, they were unswayed. Besides being personally impressed with the horse, a stallion of Tayloe's had also recently hurt himself, and Tayloe was in immediate need of a stud to replace him. Diomed went to work.

In those days, stallions did not stand in one place, but moved from stud farm to stud farm, doing live covers of mares. Diomed lived like this until he was 31 years old, and was active to his final days in 1808. His fee increased with his fame and his fame increased so quickly that Hoomes was able to sell a share in him for six times his purchase price soon after he landed on American soil.

Diomed - along with the gray stallion Medley (b. 1776), the brown stallion Shark (b. 1771), and the gray stallion Messenger (b. 1780) - was one of the four most important stallions introduced into early American Thoroughbred foundation stock. Diomed was also subsequently bred to several daughters of Medley and Shark. Diomed's offspring competed with many of the greatest horses in American turf history: Haynie's Maria (b. 1808), about whom Andrew Jackson said, "...Haynie's Maria can beat anything in God's whole creation"; Ball's Florizel (b. 1801); Potomac (b. 1803); Duroc (b. 1806), the sire of American Eclipse; and his most influential son of all, Sir Archy (b. 1805).

Sir Archy had a huge influence on Thoroughbred history in the United States, siring the line which led to Timoleon, Boston, and Lexington. His descendants include Black Caviar, Phar Lap, Secretariat and American Pharoah. Other famous descendants of Diomed included Traveller, the war mount of Confederate general Robert E. Lee, as well as Cincinnati, the war mount of Union general Ulysses S. Grant. Diomed and Sir Archy also had strong influence on many U.S. Cavalry war mounts in the American Civil War.

Furthermore, Diomed's influence has been felt through his sons regarding the development of the breeds American Quarter Horse (Sir Archy) and Standardbred (Duroc).

At Diomed's death at the age of 31 in 1808, it was reported, "...there was as much mourning over his demise as there was at the death of George Washington."

== Sire line tree ==
- Diomed
  - Grey Diomed
  - Glaucus
  - Anthony
  - Cedar
  - Greyhound
  - Wrangler
  - Poplar
  - Albemarle
  - Peacemaker
  - Top Gallant
  - Truxton
  - Wonder
    - Tennessee Oscar
      - Columbus
      - Bolivar
  - Florizel (Ball)
    - Tuckahoe
    - Orphan
    - Florizel (Turpin)
    - Richmond
    - Enterprise
  - Vingt'un
  - Stump-the-Dealer
  - Potomac
    - Little John
  - Duroc
    - Sir Lovell
    - Trouble
    - Marshal Duroc
      - Marshall Bertrand
    - American Eclipse
      - Lance
      - Eclipse (Monmouth)
        - Hornblower
        - Prospect
      - Goliah
      - Medoc
        - Grey Medoc
        - Mirabeau
        - Sir Halpin
        - Bendigo
        - Blacknose
        - Cripple
        - Red Bill
        - Telamon
        - Bob Letcher
      - Shark
        - Mariner
      - Mingo
      - Paul Clifford
      - Forward
      - Gano
      - Ten Broeck
      - Zenith
      - Eclipse (Brawner)
    - Cock of the Rock
    - Romp
    - Messenger Duroc
    - American Star (Stockholm)
      - American Star 14 (Seely)
        - Star (Wallace)
        - American Star (Goldsmith)
        - Star (Carpenter)
        - American Star Jr
        - American Star 37
        - King Pharoah
        - Magnolia
        - Sir Henry
        - Star of Catskill
    - Hampton
  - Sir Archy
    - Cicero
    - Sir Arthur
    - Director
      - Aratus
        - John Henry
    - Grey Archy
    - Spring Hill
    - Tecumseh
    - Young Sir Archy
    - Columbus
    - Reap Hook
    - Warbler
    - Walk-In-The-Water
    - Timoleon
      - Washington
      - Marquis
      - Sir John Falstaff
      - Hotspur
      - Jackson
      - Boston
        - Arlington
        - Cost Johnson
        - Ringgold
        - Commodore
        - Red Eye
        - Cracker
        - Big Boston
        - Jack Hawkins
        - Wade Hampton
        - Arrow
        - Bob Johnson
        - Lecomte
        - Lexington
        - Piketon
        - Zero
    - Lawrence
    - Carolinian
    - Contention
    - Kosciusko
      - Pulaski
      - Clermont
        - Minor
      - Woodford
      - Romulus
      - Greybeard
    - Napoleon
    - Virginian
      - Byron
      - Mercury
      - Sidi Hamet
        - Berthune
        - Andrew Hamet
    - Sir Solomon
    - Rattler
      - Marylander
    - Sir Charles
      - Collier
      - Andrew
        - Count Zaldivar
      - Frank
        - Jim Bell
      - Wagner
        - Oliver
        - Voucher
        - Monte
        - Cary Bell
        - Ashland
        - Charley Ball
        - Wagner Joe
        - Jack Gamble
        - Red Jacket
        - Starke
        - Endorser
        - Joe Stoner
        - Neil Robinson
        - Rynodyne
    - Sir William
    - Childers
    - Roanoke
      - Grey Beard
        - Santa Anna
      - John Hancock
    - Muckle John
    - Sumpter
      - Almanzor
      - Brunswick
    - Henry
      - Robin Hood
      - Gerow
    - John Richards
      - Corsica
    - Stockholder
      - Pumpkin Boy
        - Tempest
    - Arab
      - Union
    - Bertrand
      - McDonough
      - Richard Singleton
      - Woodpecker
        - Grey Eagle
      - Bertrand Jr
        - Hero
      - John Bascombe
      - Arbaces
      - Gauglion Gangle
    - Cherokee
      - Whalebone
        - Arnold Harris
    - Marion
      - Cymon
      - John Blount
    - Phoenomenon
    - Sir Richard
    - Sir William of Transport
      - Sir Leslie
        - Celestian
        - Gazan
      - Plato
    - Janus
    - Rinaldo
    - Robin Adair
    - Gohanna
    - Occupant
      - Waxy
    - Pacific
      - Chesterfield
      - Epsilon
        - Castor
        - Bill Alexander
        - Memnon
    - Saxe Weimer
    - Crusader
    - Pirate
    - Sir Archy Montorio
      - Rodolph
    - Giles Scroggins
    - Industry
      - Goldboy
    - Merlin
    - Red Gauntlet
    - Tariff
    - Hyazim
    - Wild Bill
      - Gandor
    - Copperbottom
      - Rock
        - Rocket
    - Longwaist
    - Zinganee
      - George Martin

== Pedigree ==
Pedigree of Diomed, Chestnut Stallion, 1777
Sire Florizel	Herod	Tartar	Partner*
Sire Florizel	Herod	Tartar	Meliora
Sire Florizel	Herod	Cypron	Blaze
Sire Florizel	Herod	Cypron	Salome
Sire Florizel	Cygnet Mare	Cygnet	Godolphin Arabian*
Sire Florizel	Cygnet Mare	Cygnet	Godolphin Blossom
Sire Florizel	Cygnet Mare	Young Cartouch Mare	Young Cartouch
Sire Florizel	Cygnet Mare	Young Cartouch Mare	Ebony
Dam Sister to Juno	Spectator	Crab	Alcock's Arabian
Dam Sister to Juno	Spectator	Crab	Sister to Soreheels
Dam Sister to Juno	Spectator	Partner Mare	Partner*
Dam Sister to Juno	Spectator	Partner Mare	Bonny Lass
Dam Sister to Juno	Horatia	Blank	Godolphin Arabian*
Dam Sister to Juno	Horatia	Blank	Amorett
Dam Sister to Juno	Horatia	Sister to Steady	Flying Childers
Dam Sister to Juno	Horatia	Sister to Steady	Miss Belvoir

* Diomed is inbred 4S x 4D to the stallion Partner, meaning that he appears fourth generation on the sire side of his pedigree and fourth generation on the dam side of his pedigree.

* Diomed is inbred 4S x 4D to the stallion Godolphin Arabian, meaning that he appears fourth generation on the sire side of his pedigree and fourth generation on the dam side of his pedigree.
