= American Eclipse (horse) =

American-bred Thoroughbred racehorse

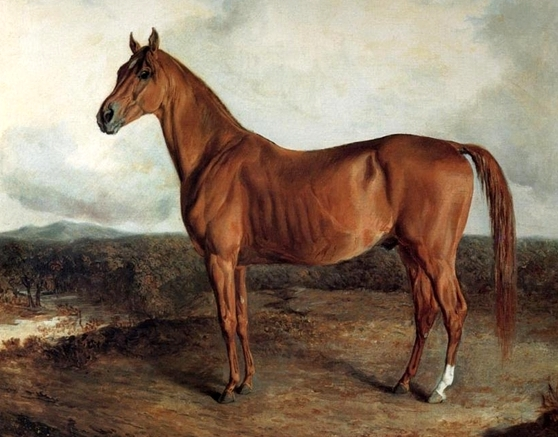
- American Eclipse, by Edward Troye
- Sire: Duroc
- Grandsire: Diomed
- Dam: Miller's Damsel
- Damsire: Messenger
- Sex: Stallion
- Foaled: 25 May 1814
- Country: United States
- Colour: Chestnut
- Breeder: Nathaniel Coles
- Owner: Cornelius W. Van Ranst; Walter Livingstone
- Trainer: No record exists, probably his owners
- Record: 8 starts, 8 wins
- Earnings: $25,000

Honours
- United States Racing Hall of Fame inductee (1970)

American Eclipse (1814–1847) was an undefeated American Thoroughbred racehorse, who raced when three- to four-mile heats were common.

== Breeding ==
American Eclipse was bred on West Island (Dosoris Island) in Glen Cove on Long Island, New York by General Nathaniel Coles. He was by Duroc (by the founding stallion Diomed), out of Miller's Damsel (known as the "Queen of the Northern Turf," by Messenger). Miller’s Damsel’s dam was a mare (foaled in 1792) by Pot8os, who was by the original Eclipse.

The horse was a chestnut stallion that stood 15 hands 1 inch high and was named after the great English champion Eclipse. The original Eclipse (1764 to 1789), about whom it was said: "Eclipse first—the rest nowhere," was so outstanding that many people named their horses Eclipse in the hope that they had another horse of his quality.

== Racing record ==
Coles didn't start American Eclipse until he was a three-year-old, and then he raced him sparingly. He had a few race starts at four and was victorious each time. He was, according to many who saw him, the greatest American racehorse of his day.

At five, he raced for Cornelius W. Van Ranst, who had purchased him from Coles for $3,000. At five, he maintained his form, but Van Ranst put him out to stud at six. At ages six and seven, he bred to a number of mares for a fee of $12.50. To assist the newly opened Union Course, Van Ranst put the horse back into training. In his next start, he defeated the good mare Lady Lightfoot (a winner of 31 races), by Sir Archy, in the first heat. He distanced her in the second heat when they were the only starters since all others had withdrawn. In his next race, all other horses scratched after contesting American Eclipse in the first heat, except Sir Walter who lost.

At this point, a match race was organized between American Eclipse and James J. Harrison’s noted horse Sir Charles. Sir Charles, with 20 wins to his credit, injured himself in a workout, and Harrison was required to forfeit the match, which American Eclipse won. A second match was arranged only a single heat, and this time Sir Charles raced but broke down, leaving American Eclipse an easy winner.

=== American Eclipse versus Sir Henry match Race ===
When American Eclipse was nine years old, another challenge was issued with the intent to race five top horses against American Eclipse, who would represent the North. The race was to be run six months from the date of the challenge over the old Long Island Union Course. (This kind of thing was often done, with no one knowing what condition a horse might be in after six months, and in this case, with the South not having to name the horses challenging.) The South's noted horseman William Johnson trained six horses from the South before deciding that Henry was to race American Eclipse. The race was to be decided with the best two of three four-mile heats for a purse of $10,000. Over 60,000 people attended to see American Eclipse contest Henry (three years old and by Sir Archy). Also racing were John Richards and Washington, not tested at such a distance, but with so much time before the race, their owners intended that they would be. By the time the race came round, two Southern horses had pulled out: Washington for proving not good enough in his training, and John Richards for injury.

Among the great crowd at Union Course on May 27, 1823 was Andrew Jackson, then American governor of Florida. So were the Vice-President of the United States, Daniel Tompkins, and the infamous Aaron Burr, who had shot and killed Alexander Hamilton in a duel about 19 years earlier (July 11, 1804).

Racing against Henry and ridden by William Crafts, American Eclipse lost the first heat by a length (the only time he was ever beaten) to Henry, whose time of 7.37 was the best yet seen in America over four miles. American Eclipse, at nine, carried 126 pounds (57 kg), while his much younger rival carried 108 pounds (49 kg). The famed turf historian Cadwallader R. Colden (who wrote under the name "An Old Turfman”) said that American Eclipse was ridden badly by Crafts, who whipped and spurred him in the first heat. William Crafts was replaced after this heat by the noted Samuel Purdy, who had retired but gladly rode a horse he'd ridden in his youth. In the second heat, American Eclipse raced close to Henry and won this heat. In the third and last heat, the horses were exhausted, but American Eclipse was more seasoned and won by three lengths, to the jubilation of the North.

In his eight race starts, he won eight times, earning $25,000.

== Stud record ==
American Eclipse was sold at a public auction for $8,050 to Walter Livingstone, who permanently retired him to stud in New York. There he sired his best son, Medoc. Then he was sent to Virginia and finally, in 1837, to Kentucky. American Eclipse produced numerous stakes winners and others including Ariel, a filly who won 42 of 57 starts, including 18 four-mile heats; Black Maria (out of Lady Lightfoot, his old rival) who won 11 races with three- and four-mile heats; Lize (second dam of Enquirer); Ten Broeck (not the Nantura Farm Ten Broeck); Monmouth Eclipse; Bay Maria; and Gano.

Last owned by Jilson Yates, American Eclipse died in Shelby County, Kentucky, in August 1847, when he was 33 years old.

One hundred and twenty-three years later, in 1970, he was inducted into the National Museum of Racing and Hall of Fame.

== Sire line tree ==
- American Eclipse
  - Lance
  - Eclipse (Monmouth)
    - Hornblower
    - Prospect
  - Goliah
  - Medoc
    - Grey Medoc
    - Mirabeau
    - Sir Halpin
    - Bendigo
    - Blacknose
    - Cripple
    - Red Bill
    - Telamon
    - Bob Letcher
  - Shark
    - Mariner
  - Mingo
  - Paul Clifford
  - Forward
  - Gano
  - Ten Broeck
  - Zenith
  - Eclipse (Brawner)

== Pedigree ==
Pedigree of American Eclipse
Sire Duroc 1806	Diomed; 1777	Florizel	Herod
Sire Duroc 1806	Diomed; 1777	Florizel	Cygnet mare, 1761
Sire Duroc 1806	Diomed; 1777	Sister to Juno, 1763	Spectator
Sire Duroc 1806	Diomed; 1777	Sister to Juno, 1763	Horatia
Sire Duroc 1806	Amanda; 1800	Tayloe's Grey Diomed	Medley
Sire Duroc 1806	Amanda; 1800	Tayloe's Grey Diomed	Sloe Mare
Sire Duroc 1806	Amanda; 1800	Virginia Cade mare	Virginia Cade
Sire Duroc 1806	Amanda; 1800	Virginia Cade mare	Independence Mare
Dam Millers Damsel 1802	Messenger; 1780	Mambrino	Engineer
Dam Millers Damsel 1802	Messenger; 1780	Mambrino	Cade mare, 1751
Dam Millers Damsel 1802	Messenger; 1780	Turf mare, 1774	Turf
Dam Millers Damsel 1802	Messenger; 1780	Turf mare, 1774	Regulus mare, 1761
Dam Millers Damsel 1802	Potoooooooo mare 1792	Potoooooooo	Eclipse
Dam Millers Damsel 1802	Potoooooooo mare 1792	Potoooooooo	Sportsmistress
Dam Millers Damsel 1802	Potoooooooo mare 1792	Gimcrack mare, 1778	Gimcrack
Dam Millers Damsel 1802	Potoooooooo mare 1792	Gimcrack mare, 1778	Snapdragon (Family: 3-a)

== See also ==
- List of leading Thoroughbred racehorses
