= Sir Archy =

19th-century American Thoroughbred stallion

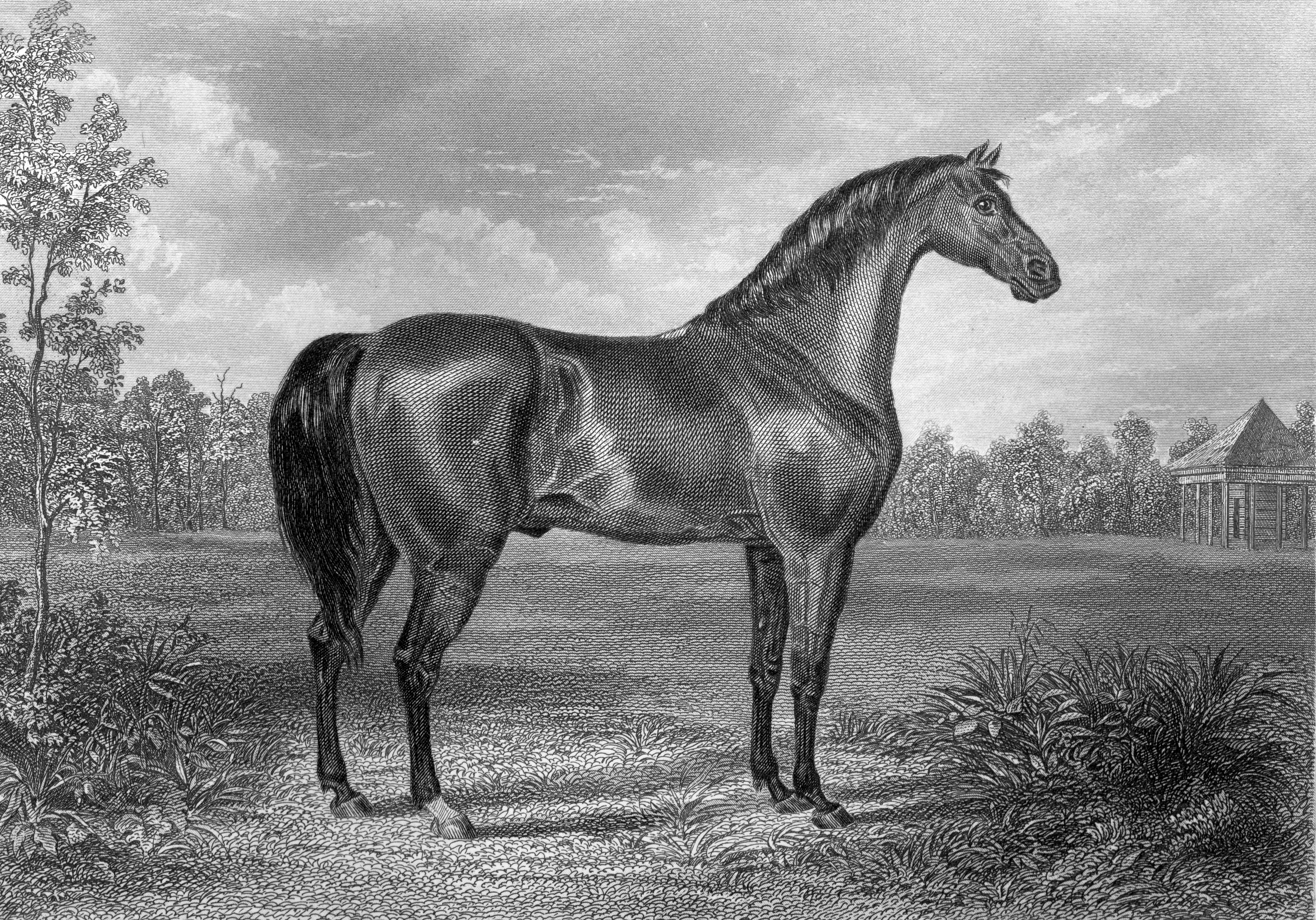
- Engraving of Sir Archy from Frank Forester's Horse and Horsemanship of the United States vol. 1, published 1857
- Sire: Diomed GB
- Grandsire: Florizel GB
- Dam: Castianira GB
- Damsire: Rockingham GB
- Sex: Stallion
- Foaled: 1805
- Country: United States (Virginia)
- Colour: Dark Bay
- Breeder: Capt. Archibald Randolph; Col. John Tayloe III
- Owner: Ralph Wormely VI Col. William R. Johnson at 3 Gen. William R. Davie, William Amis at stud at Mowfield Plantation
- Trainer: Thomas Larkin; Arthur Taylor
- Record: 7 Starts: 4-1-0
- Earnings: Unknown

Major wins
- Post Stakes (1809); Jockey Club Purse, Fairfield (1809); Jockey Club Purse, Petersburg (1809); Match race with the splendid four-miler, Blank (1809)

Honours
- U.S. Racing Hall of Fame (1955)
- Last updated on December 19, 2007

Sir Archy (or Archy, Archie, or Sir Archie; 1805–1833) was an American Thoroughbred racehorse considered one of the best racehorses of his time and later one of the most important sires in American history. He was inducted into the National Museum of Racing and Hall of Fame in the inaugural class of 1955.

== Early life ==
Born and bred in Virginia by two Americans, Capt. Archibald Randolph and Col. John Tayloe III, Sir Archy's sire was the inaugural Epsom Derby winner Diomed, who had been imported from England as an older horse by Tayloe. His dam, a blind mare named Castianira, had been purchased in England by Tayloe for his own Mount Airy Farm, but was bred on shares with his friend Randolph. Sir Archy, Castianira's second foal, was born on Randolph's Ben Lomond Plantation on the James River in Goochland County. The colt, dark bay with a small patch of white on his right hind pastern, was originally named "Robert Burns"; Tayloe changed the colt's name in honor of Randolph.

== On the track ==
When Sir Archy was two, Tayloe and Randolph sold him to Ralph Wormely IV for $400 and an unknown filly. When Wormely later decided to quit horse racing Sir Archy was offered for sale, but there were no takers. Still owned by Wormely, Sir Archy made his first start in the Washington Jockey Club Sweepstakes late in his three-year-old season. At this point, he already stood 16 hands (64 inches, 163 cm) high. Though Sir Archy had not yet recovered from a case of strangles, Wormely ran him rather than pay a forfeit fee. Still unwell, Sir Archy made his second start a month later at the Fairfield Sweepstakes in Richmond, Virginia. Though he won only the third heat and finished third overall to Col. William Ransom Johnson's colt True Blue, Johnson promptly bought Sir Archy for $1,500.

Now in the hands of Johnson's trainer, Arthur Taylor, Sir Archy became one of the greatest runners of his day, excelling in four-mile heats. Johnson wrote, "I have only to say that, in my opinion, Sir Archy is the best horse I ever saw, and I well know that I never had any thing to do with one that was at all his equal; and this I will back; for, if any horse in the world, will run against him at any half way ground, four mile heats, according to the rules of racing, you may consider me $5000 with you on him. He was in good condition this fall, (1809) and has not run with any horse that could put him to half speed towards the end of the race."

One of his most important matches was with Blank, in which Sir Archy won the first heat in 7:53 – the fastest time ever run to that point south of the James River. Following that race, he was purchased for $5,000 by General William Richardson Davie, the governor of North Carolina. Davie retired the horse to stud because there were no opponents willing to race against him. His record on the racetrack was 7 starts, with 4 wins and 1 second.

== At stud ==
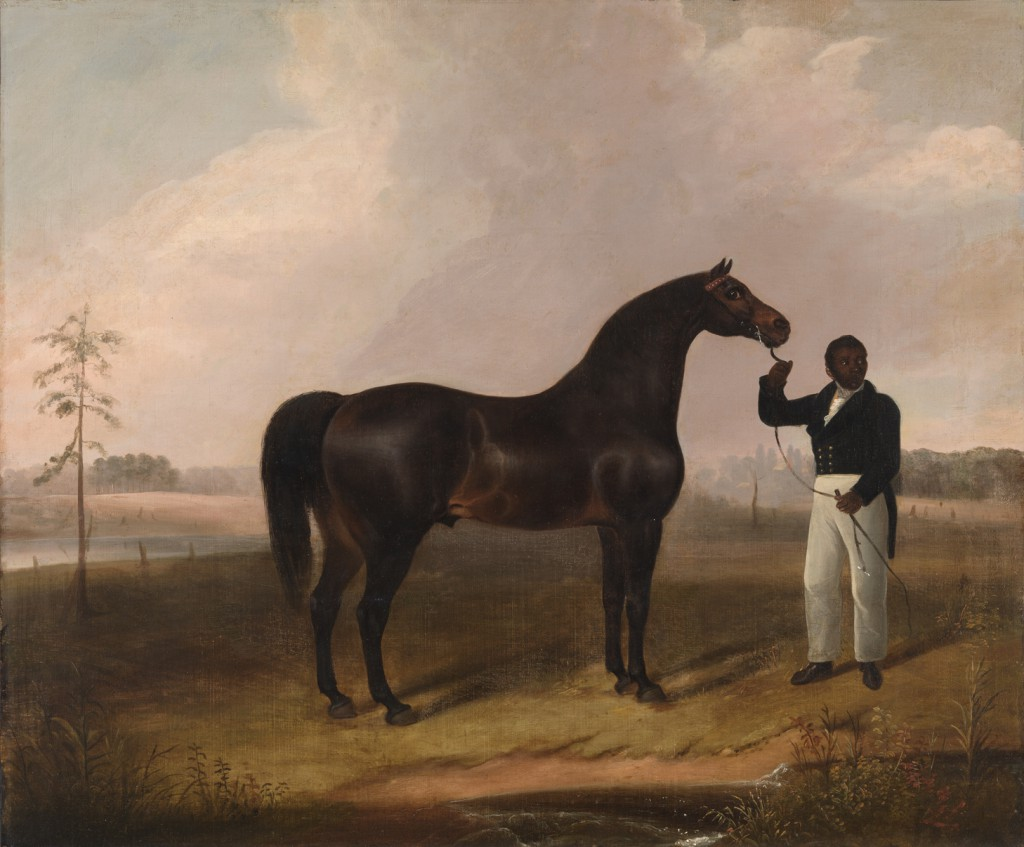
Sir Archy by Diomed out of Castianira by Alvan Fisher, ca. w/ caretaker Hardy. 1823-25. In the collection of the Virginia Museum of Fine Arts

Sir Archy then became what most experts consider to be the first great Thoroughbred stallion bred in America. He went to stud, at first under Davie, then under Davie's son, who appears to have stood the stallion in Virginia for a couple of years. Then William Amis bought Sir Archy, and stood the horse for 25 of his 28 years at his plantation, Mowfield, near the Roanoke River in Northampton County, North Carolina. Even at the advanced age of 24, Sir Archy's stud fee was $100. Amis' son estimated that during the years he stood at Mowfield, Sir Archy earned $76,000 in stud fees.

The stallion became known as the Godolphin Arabian of America, meaning that his influence on the American Thoroughbred was as important as the Godolphin Arabian's influence on European breeding. Like the "Blind Hero of Woodburn", Lexington — who was his great–grandson — Sir Archy became one of America's greatest foundation sires. Throughout the 1820s, the fastest horses in America were descendants of Sir Archy.

In 1827, the Washington DC Jockey Club and the Maryland Jockey Club announced that only a limited number of horses were eligible to run in their races. Although the fine points of the announcement were complex, it effectively barred all horses sired by Sir Archy; his offspring were so successful that few, if any, horses not sired by Sir Archy bothered to race. Both Jockey Clubs admitted they were concerned about their long-term viability.

== Sir Archy's progeny ==
Turf historian John Hervey wrote: "Before nor since, nothing has been known in America to equal the manner in which the Archys dominated both turf and stud for over half a century, beginning with the debut of his first crop of foals, in 1814 and culminating with the last of the sixteen seasons of premiership of his inbred great-grandson Lexington in 1878."

=== As sire ===
Siring at least 31 racing champions, and influencing the American Quarter Horse through his son Copperbottom, the following is a list of some of his most notable offspring:

- Timoleon (foaled 1814; considered the best racehorse of his day, sire of Boston)
- Bertrand (foaled 1826; Some call him Sir Archy's best; became a national leading sire in his own right)
- Sir Charles (foaled 1816; national leading sire in 1830, 1831, 1832, 1833 and 1836)
- Sumpter (foaled 1818; won eight consecutive races when races were grueling heats. Became a broodmare sire of great note)
- Stockholder (foaled 1819; most popular sire in Tennessee at the time. His daughters were extremely successful producers)
- Lady Lightfoot (foaled 1812; records are incomplete but she may have won 30 – 40 races, racing through age 11. In her first try, she ran the fastest heats in Maryland up to that time. As a broodmare, she produced eight foals in nine years. One, Black Maria, was considered better than her dam)
- Reality (foaled 1813; a filly rated at least as good as Sir Archy or Boston by William R. Johnson. He owned all three at various times)
- Henry (foaled 1819; a very good racehorse, a popular sire, and the only horse to ever defeat American Eclipse)
- Sally Hope (foaled 1822; won 22 of her 27 races, the last 18 in succession)
- Flirtilla (foaled 1828; influential carrier of Sir Archy's blood)

=== As grandsire and beyond ===
Into the second generation, Sir Archy's influence became even more pronounced. This was partly because inbreeding to Sir Archy and to his sire, Diomed, became quite fashionable among American breeders. In Sir Archy's case, he was bred back to his daughters and his sire's daughters. This kind of inbreeding, ordinarily risky, was successful for the Sir Archy-Diomed line.

- Bonnets o' Blue (by Sir Charles out of Reality; dam of Fashion)
- Boston, sired by Timoleon
- Lexington, sired by Boston, who was sired by Timoleon

== Retirement ==
At the age of 26 Sir Archy ended his stud career in 1831, living for two more years until his death in 1833 on June 7. Coincidentally, this was the same day that one of his greatest sons (Sir Charles) also died.

Sir Archy was one of the first few horses inducted into the National Museum of Racing and Hall of Fame in 1955.

Sir Archy's burial location is disputed between two locations:

- Claimed site one: Sir Archy is buried, along with his groom and canine companion, at Ben Lomond Farm in Goochland, Virginia where he was born. A historical marker, erected by the Goochland County (Virginia) Historical Society in 1972, marks his grave. The grave is surrounded by a stone wall and is now hidden by trees in the southeast corner of a field at the top of the farm acreage.
- Claimed site two: Sir Archy is buried at the Mowfield Plantation in Northampton County North Carolina, just west of the town of Jackson. He resided there from 1818 until his death in 1833. His exact location of burial is unknown. The original plantation house still stands. However, when it was renovated, the property owners preferred to live in the house, and updated the interior for modern convenience.

== Sire line tree ==
Sir Archy descendants (click to expand)
- Sir Archy
  - Cicero
  - Sir Arthur
  - Director
    - Aratus
      - John Henry
  - Grey Archy
  - Spring Hill
  - Tecumseh
  - Young Sir Archy
  - Columbus
  - Reap Hook
  - Warbler
  - Walk-In-The-Water
  - Timoleon
    - Washington
    - Marquis
    - Sir John Falstaff
    - Hotspur
    - Jackson
    - Boston
      - Arlington
      - Cost Johnson
      - Ringgold
        - Woodford
        - Ringmaster
        - Tipperary
      - Commodore
        - Gen Rosseau
      - Red Eye
      - Cracker
        - Billy Cheatham
        - Bruce
      - Big Boston
      - Jack Hawkins
        - Odd Fellow
      - Arrow
      - Bob Johnson
      - Wade Hampton
      - Lecomte
        - Sherrod
        - Umpire
      - Lexington
        - Daniel Boone
        - Goodwood
        - Colton
        - Lightning
        - Optomist
        - Uncle Vic
        - Bulletin
        - Jack Malone
        - Lexington (Embry)
        - Thunder
        - Avalanche
        - Censor
        - Frank Boston
        - Harper
        - Jim Sherwood
        - Lexington (Hunter)
        - War Dance
        - Union Jack
        - Copec
        - Rogers
        - Asteroid
        - Beacon
        - Chesapeake
        - Cincinnati
        - Donerail
        - Kentucky
        - Loadstone
        - Norfolk
        - Ulverston
        - Woodburn
        - Ansel
        - Bay Dick
        - Gilroy
        - Harry of the West
        - Luther
        - Veto
        - Edinborough
        - Jonesboro
        - King Lear
        - Lee Paul
        - Lever
        - Merrill
        - Norway
        - Red Dick
        - Watson
        - Baywood
        - Concord
        - King Tom
        - Marion
        - Bayonet
        - Crossland
        - General Duke
        - Hazard
        - Paris
        - Pat Malloy
        - Vauxhall
        - Barney Willams
        - Chillecothe
        - Foster
        - Kingfisher
        - Pilgrim
        - Preakness
        - Creole Dance
        - Harry Bassett
        - Monarchist
        - Pimlico
        - Wanderer
        - Tom Bowling
        - Acrobat
        - Breathitt
        - Jack Boston
        - King Bolt
        - Tom Ochiltree
        - Charley Howard
        - Fiddlesticks
        - Shirley
        - Brown Prince
        - Frederick the Great
        - Duke of Magenta
        - Uncas
      - Piketon
      - Zero
        - Judge Leonard
  - Lawrence
  - Carolinian
  - Contention
  - Kosciusko
    - Pulaski
    - Clermont
      - Minor
    - Woodford
    - Romulus
    - Greybeard
  - Napoleon
  - Sir Solomon
  - Virginian
    - Byron
    - Mercury
    - Sidi Hamet
      - Berthune
        - Don Juan
      - Andrew Hamet
  - Rattler
    - Marylander
  - Sir Charles
    - Collier
    - Andrew
      - Count Zaldivar
    - Frank
      - Jim Bell
    - Wagner
      - Oliver
      - Voucher
        - Whale
        - Rupee
        - Restless
      - Monte
      - Cary Bell
      - Ashland
      - Charley Ball
      - Wagner Joe
      - Jack Gamble
        - Jack Gamble Jr
      - Red Jacket
      - Starke
        - Wissehrad
      - Endorser
        - Excel
      - Joe Stoner
      - Neil Robinson
      - Rynodyne
        - Blarneystone
  - Sir William
  - Childers
  - Roanoke
    - Grey Beard
      - Santa Anna
    - John Hancock
  - Muckle John
  - Sumpter
    - Almanzor
    - Brunswick
  - Henry
    - Robin Hood
    - Gerow
  - John Richards
    - Corsica
  - Stockholder
    - Pumpkin Boy
      - Tempest
        - Bob Perkins
  - Arab
    - Union
  - Bertrand
    - McDonough
    - Richard Singleton
    - Woodpecker
      - Grey Eagle
        - Bulwer
    - Bertrand Jr
      - Hero
        - Jeff Davis
    - John Bascombe
    - Arbaces
    - Gauglion Gangle
  - Cherokee
    - Whalebone
      - Arnold Harris
  - Marion
    - Cymon
    - John Blount
  - Phoenomenon
  - Sir Richard
  - Sir William of Transport
    - Sir Leslie
      - Celestian
      - Gazan
        - Monarch
    - Plato
  - Janus
  - Rinaldo
  - Robin Adair
  - Gohanna
  - Occupant
    - Waxy
  - Pacific
    - Chesterfield
    - Epsilon
      - Castor
      - Bill Alexander
      - Memnon
  - Saxe Weimer
  - Crusader
  - Pirate
  - Sir Archy Montorio
    - Rodolph
  - Giles Scroggins
  - Industry
    - Goldboy
  - Merlin
  - Red Gauntlet
  - Tariff
  - Hyazim
  - Wild Bill
    - Gandor
  - Copperbottom
    - Rock
      - Rocket
        - Buck
  - Longwaist
  - Zinganee
    - George Martin

== Pedigree ==
Pedigree of Sir Archy, bay stallion, 1805
Sire Diomed 1777	Florizel; 1786	Herod*	Tartar
Sire Diomed 1777	Florizel; 1786	Herod*	Cypron
Sire Diomed 1777	Florizel; 1786	Cygnet Mare	Cygnet
Sire Diomed 1777	Florizel; 1786	Cygnet Mare	Young Cartouch Mare
Sire Diomed 1777	Sister to Juno; 1763	Spectator	Crab
Sire Diomed 1777	Sister to Juno; 1763	Spectator	Partner Mare
Sire Diomed 1777	Sister to Juno; 1763	Horatia	Blank
Sire Diomed 1777	Sister to Juno; 1763	Horatia	Sister One to Steady
Dam Castianira 1796	Rockingham; 1781	Highflyer	Herod*
Dam Castianira 1796	Rockingham; 1781	Highflyer	Rachel
Dam Castianira 1796	Rockingham; 1781	Purity	Matchem
Dam Castianira 1796	Rockingham; 1781	Purity	Pratt's Old Mare
Dam Castianira 1796	Tabitha; 1782	Trentham	Gowers Sweepstakes
Dam Castianira 1796	Tabitha; 1782	Trentham	Miss South
Dam Castianira 1796	Tabitha; 1782	Bosphorus Mare	Bosphorus
Dam Castianira 1796	Tabitha; 1782	Bosphorus Mare	Forester Mare (family: 13)

* Sir Archy is inbred 3S x 4D to the stallion Herod, meaning that he appears third generation on the sire side of his pedigree and fourth generation on the dam side of his pedigree.
