= King Tom (horse) =

British thoroughbred racehorse

- Statue of King Tom above the horse's grave at Mentmore Towers
- Sire: Harkaway
- Grandsire: Economist
- Dam: Pocahontas
- Damsire: Glencoe
- Sex: Stallion
- Foaled: 1851
- Country: Great Britain
- Colour: Bay
- Breeder: Samuel Thellusson
- Owner: Baron Mayer de Rothschild
- Record: 6: 3-?-?

Major wins
- Biennial Stakes (1853); Triennial Produce Stakes (1853)

Awards
- Leading sire in Great Britain & Ireland (1870, 1871)
- Last updated on 21 December 2021

King Tom (1851–1878) was a British Thoroughbred racehorse and a leading sire in Great Britain & Ireland.

== Pedigree ==
He was a bay horse foaled in 1851, sired by Harkaway and out of the exceptional mare Pocahontas by Glencoe. King Tom was a half-brother to 14 of Pocahontas' foals including, Auricula (a stakes winner), plus Stockwell and his brother, Rataplan, both being by The Baron.

== Racing record ==
King Tom won races at age two and at age three he was not quite recovered from an injury when he finished second by a length to Andover in the 1854 Epsom Derby. He came out of the Derby with a tendon injury that curtailed his racing for the remainder of the year. At age four, King Tom returned to the track and won one race before breaking down.

== Stud record ==
Retired to stud duty, King Tom became the foundation stallion for Baron Mayer de Rothschild's Mentmore and Crafton Studs. Between 1861 and 1877 he was one of the United Kingdom's top ten sires 14 times and the Leading sire in Great Britain & Ireland in 1870 and 1871. King Tom sired the 1866 and 1867 Epsom Oaks winners, Tormentor and Hippia, as well as the 1870 Epsom Derby winner Kingcraft. He also sired 1864 1,000 Guineas Stakes winner Tomato plus another outstanding filly Hannah who in 1871 won the Epsom Oaks, 1,000 Guineas and St. Leger Stakes. One of his most important foals was his daughter, St. Angela, dam of St. Simon and second dam of Orme.

King Tom is the damsire of Favonius, winner of the 1871 Epsom Derby and the grandsire of the Irish Derby winner Umpire plus the grandsire of United States Racing Hall of Fame inductee, Ten Broeck.

King Tom died at age twenty-seven in January 1878. He was buried in the grounds of Mentmore Towers beneath a life sized bronze statue by Sir Joseph Boehm. The statue is now at Dalmeny House in Scotland.

== Sire line tree ==
- King Tom
  - King Of Diamonds
    - Investment
  - Janus
  - Prince Plausible
  - Old Calabar
    - Indian Ocean
  - Wingrave
  - Mogador
    - Pathfinder
    - The Muleteer
    - Whackum
  - King Of The Vale
  - King Charming
  - Dalesman
    - Lowlander
      - Lowland Chief
  - Janitor
  - Lothario
    - Revenge
    - Piersfield
    - Vengeance
    - Captain
    - Gay Lothario
    - Lochinvar
  - Tomahawk
  - Tom King
    - Umpire
  - King Alfred
  - Phaeton
    - Aramis
    - Jack Hardy
    - King Alfonso
      - Fonso
      - Grenada
      - Foxhall
      - Joe Cotton
    - St Martin
    - Ten Broeck
      - Ten Strike
      - Bersan
        - Sacket
      - Jim Gray
      - Free Knight
        - Elwood
    - Harry Peyton
    - King Faro
    - Lisbon
      - Troubadour
        - Daily America
        - Lookout
  - Restitution
  - King Cole
    - Little Jack
    - Nelson
      - Pegasus
    - Off Colour
    - The Knave
  - King O'Scots
    - Potenate
  - Kingcraft
    - King Shepherd
    - Strathblane
    - King Pippin
    - Kingdom
      - King
    - Grand Master
      - Loutch
    - Vernet
    - King Olaf
    - Mount Armstrong
  - Ethelred
  - King Ernest
    - Report
    - Gov Shevlin
    - Kingcraft
    - Easter Sunday
      - Reveller
    - King Eric
      - Prince Lief
      - Dick Welles
        - Wintergreen
        - Billy Kelly
      - Ort Wells
      - Dick Finnell
        - Liberty Loan
        - Westy Hogan
    - Trillion
  - King Lud
    - Ben Alder
    - King Monmouth
      - Kings Messenger
        - Clarenceux
    - Reyezuelo
    - Walter Scott
    - Acoli
    - Lavoir
  - Marsworth
    - Piccolomini
    - Elfenbein
  - Peeping Tom
  - Coltness
  - Great Tom
    - General Harding
    - Thackery
    - Tyrant
      - Masque
      - The Manxman
    - Advance Guard
  - Skylark
    - Paddy
    - The Soarer
  - Wild Tommy
  - King Ban
    - Punster
    - Violator
    - Ban Fox
    - Banburg
    - King Fox
    - King Thomas

== Pedigree ==
Pedigree of King Tom, bay stallion, 1851
Sire Harkaway	Economist; 1825	Whisker	Waxy*
Sire Harkaway	Economist; 1825	Whisker	Penelope*
Sire Harkaway	Economist; 1825	Floranthe	Octavian
Sire Harkaway	Economist; 1825	Floranthe	Caprice
Sire Harkaway	Fanny Dawson; 1823	Nabocklish	Rugantino
Sire Harkaway	Fanny Dawson; 1823	Nabocklish	Butterfly
Sire Harkaway	Fanny Dawson; 1823	Miss Tooley	Teddy the Grinder
Sire Harkaway	Fanny Dawson; 1823	Miss Tooley	Lady Jane
Dam Pocahontas 1837	Glencoe; 1831	Sultan	Selim
Dam Pocahontas 1837	Glencoe; 1831	Sultan	Bacchante
Dam Pocahontas 1837	Glencoe; 1831	Trampoline	Tramp
Dam Pocahontas 1837	Glencoe; 1831	Trampoline	Web*
Dam Pocahontas 1837	Marpessa; 1831	Muley	Orville
Dam Pocahontas 1837	Marpessa; 1831	Muley	Eleanor
Dam Pocahontas 1837	Marpessa; 1831	Clare	Marmion
Dam Pocahontas 1837	Marpessa; 1831	Clare	Harpalice (Family: 3-m)

* King Tom is inbred 4S x 5D to the stallion Waxy, meaning that he appears fourth generation on the sire side of his pedigree, and fifth generation (via Web) on the dam side of his pedigree.

* King Tom is inbred 4S x 5D to the mare Penelope, meaning that she appears fourth generation on the sire side of his pedigree, and fifth generation (via Web) on the dam side of his pedigree.
