= Abraham Perry =

American horse trainer

Personal information
- Born: c. 1842 Midway, Kentucky, United States
- Died: 1908
- Resting place: African Cemetery No. 2, Lexington, Kentucky
- Occupation: Racehorse trainer

Horse racing career
- Sport: Horse racing

Major racing wins
- Colts Stakes (1876); Colt and Filly Stakes (1876); Belle Meade Stakes (1876); Clark Handicap (1877); Phoenix Hotel Stakes (1877); Phoenix Hotel Fall Stakes (1877); Coney Island Derby (1885); Saratoga Cup (1885); Tennessee Derby (1885); Tidal Stakes (1885) American Classics wins: Kentucky Derby (1885)

Significant horses
- Joe Cotton, McWhirter

Abraham Perry (c. 1842–1908) was an American thoroughbred horse trainer born in Midway, Kentucky best remembered as the winner of the 1885 Kentucky Derby with Joe Cotton. He was the first African-American trainer of a classic race winner to be mentioned in post-race reports.

== Racing career ==
Abe Perry began his career training for Gen. Abraham Buford at his Bosque Bonita breeding farm in Woodford County, Kentucky. From 1876 through 1878 he conditioned the colt McWhirter to several stakes race wins. He ran fifth to Baden-Baden in the May 22, 1877 Kentucky Derby but came back less than a week later to defeat Baden-Baden in the May 28 Clark Handicap at Churchill Downs.

Among his other wins with Joe Cotton, in 1885 Abe Perry won the important Tennessee Derby in Nashville and Coney Island Derby at the Sheepshead Bay Race Track in Brooklyn, New York.

Perry is buried in African Cemetery No. 2 in Lexington, Kentucky.
