= Joe Cotton (horse) =

American-bred Thoroughbred racehorse

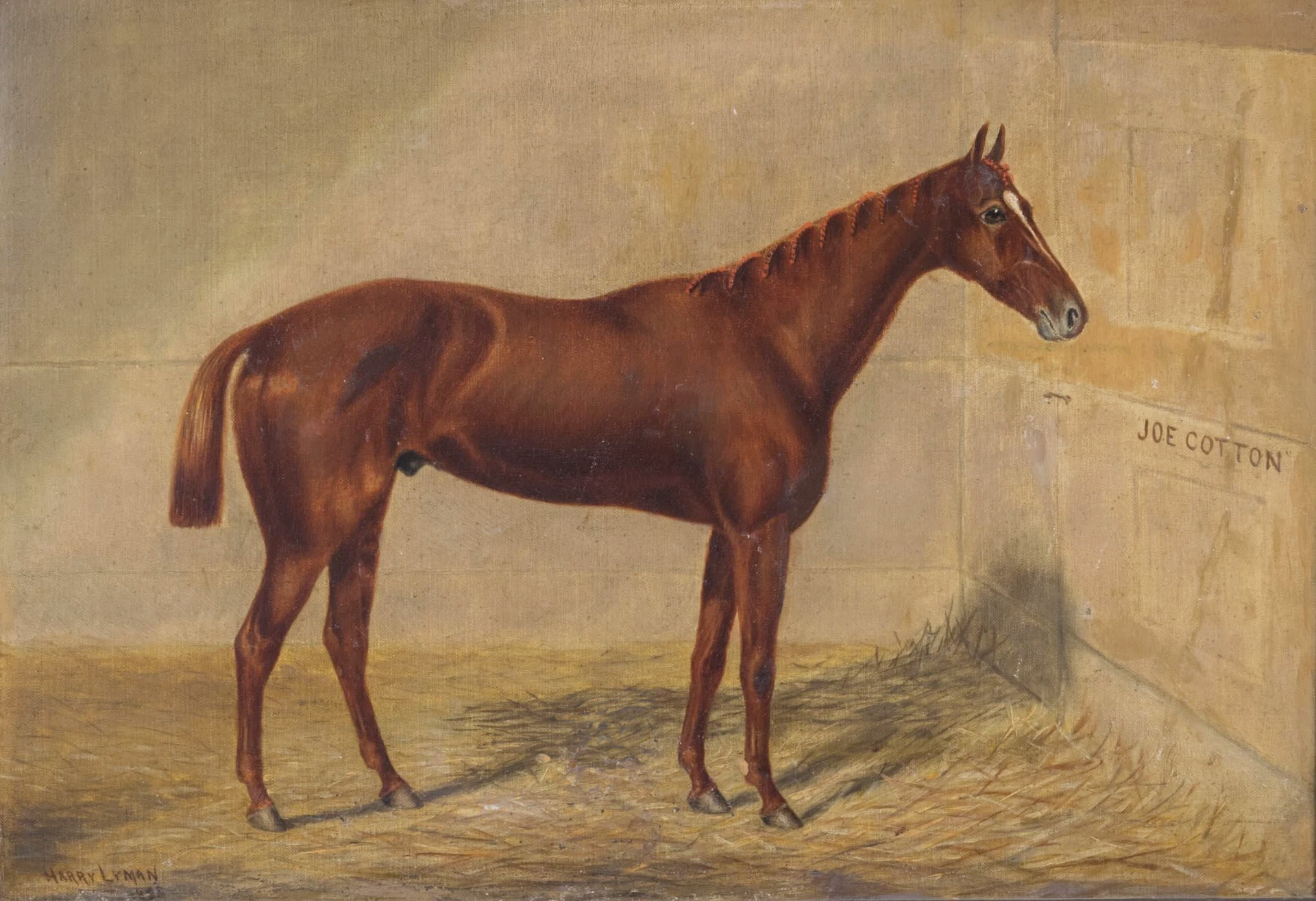
- Drawing of Joe Cotton
- Sire: King Alfonso
- Grandsire: Phaeton
- Dam: Inverness
- Damsire: Macaroni
- Sex: Stallion
- Foaled: 1882
- Country: United States
- Colour: Chestnut
- Breeder: A. J. Alexander
- Owner: 1) James T. Williams; 2) Dwyer Brothers Stable
- Trainer: Abraham Perry
- Record: 54: 17-6-7
- Earnings: $29,365

Major wins
- Great Western Handicap (1885); Coney Island Derby (1885); Tidal Stakes (1885); Himyar Stakes (1885); Louis and Gus Straus Stakes (1885); Tennessee Derby (1885); Cottrill Stakes (1885); Farewell Stakes (1886); Average Stakes (1887); Twin City Handicap (1887); Welter Stakes (1887) American Classic Race wins: Kentucky Derby (1885)

Joe Cotton (1882–after 1900) was an American Thoroughbred racehorse that is best known as the winner of the 1885 Kentucky Derby. He was sired by King Alfonso who also sired the 1880 Derby winner Fonso. The horse was reportedly named after a bookie.

== Another African-American success ==
Trained by African-American Abraham Perry, Joe Cotton was ridden by Erskine Henderson who became the sixth of eleven African-American jockeys to ever win the Kentucky Derby.

== Racing injury ==
Joe Cotton was inaccurately reportedly to have died, along with another Thoroughbred called Sam Keene, on September 11, 1888, during the third race at the Mystic Park race track in Boston, Massachusetts. In reality, he had dislocated a shoulder when he fell over the body of Sam Keene, which had fallen and broken its neck while colliding with another foundering racehorse named Zero. Afterward, Joe Cotton was bought by Charles Jacobs of Medford, Massachusetts. Jacobs reportedly took Joe Cotton to a river and allowed the horse to swim to reset his shoulder joint into place. Jacobs used Joe Cotton as a breeding stallion and raised Thoroughbred-cross horses. Joe Cotton was sent to New York in June 1892. By 1895, he was owned by a Mr. Newhall and was employed pulling a hack in Medford. The horse was frequently observed by horseman Frank Ware at a local steeplechase meeting until a few years before 1905 and is listed as a native stallion in the 1902 edition of the American Stud Book.

== Pedigree ==
Pedigree of Joe Cotton
Sire King Alfonso 1872	Phaeton 1865	King Tom	Harkaway
Sire King Alfonso 1872	Phaeton 1865	King Tom	Pocahontas*
Sire King Alfonso 1872	Phaeton 1865	Merry Sunshine	Storm
Sire King Alfonso 1872	Phaeton 1865	Merry Sunshine	Falstaff Mare
Sire King Alfonso 1872	Capitola 1858	Vandal	Glencoe*
Sire King Alfonso 1872	Capitola 1858	Vandal	Tranby Mare
Sire King Alfonso 1872	Capitola 1858	Margrave Mare	Margrave
Sire King Alfonso 1872	Capitola 1858	Margrave Mare	Mistletoe
Dam Iverness 1866	Macaroni 1860	Sweetmeat	Gladiator
Dam Iverness 1866	Macaroni 1860	Sweetmeat	Lollypop
Dam Iverness 1866	Macaroni 1860	Jocose	Pantaloon
Dam Iverness 1866	Macaroni 1860	Jocose	Banter
Dam Iverness 1866	Elfrida 1853	Faugh-a-Ballagh	Sir Hercules
Dam Iverness 1866	Elfrida 1853	Faugh-a-Ballagh	Guiccioli
Dam Iverness 1866	Elfrida 1853	Espoir	Liverpool
Dam Iverness 1866	Elfrida 1853	Espoir	Esperance

* Joe Cotton is inbred 5S x 4S to the stallion Glencoe, meaning that he appears fifth generation (via Pocahontas) and fourth generation on the sire side of his pedigree.
