= 1877 Kentucky Derby =

Horse race

3rd Kentucky Derby
- Grade I stakes race
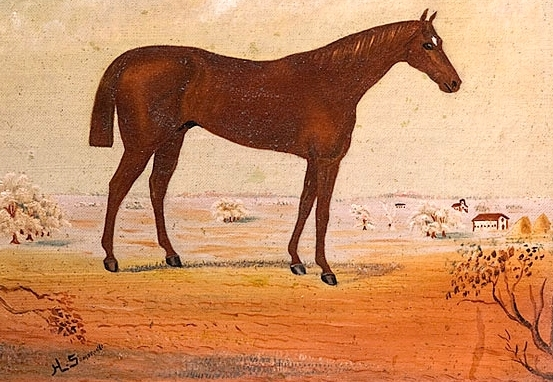
- Baden-Baden, the 1877 winner.
- Location: Churchill Downs
- Date: May 22, 1877
- Winning horse: Baden-Baden
- Jockey: William Walker
- Trainer: Edward D. Brown
- Owner: Daniel Swigert
- Surface: Dirt

The 1877 Kentucky Derby was the 3rd running of the Kentucky Derby. The race took place on May 22, 1877. The 1877 Derby was the first to attract a major celebrity spectator, Polish actress Helena Modjeska. Mint juleps, sometimes associated with the Derby, were first served at this race to Modjeska. Baden-Baden, the horse that won, went on to win the Travers Stakes, one of only ten horses to do this. William Walker, his jockey, was one of the Black jockeys who dominated the sport in the South after the Civil war. He went on to become a respected expert and advisor on Thoroughbred and attended every Derby for the rest of his life.

== Full results ==
Finished	Post	Horse	Jockey	Trainer	Owner	Time / behind
1st		Baden-Baden	William Walker	Edward D. Brown	Daniel Swigert	2:38 0/0
2nd		Leonard	Robert Swim		Hal Pettit McGrath	
3rd		King William	Bailey		Smallwood & Co.	
4th		Vera Cruz	Isaac Burns Murphy		James T. Williams	
5th		McWhirter	H. Moore	Abraham Perry	Gen. Abe Buford	
6th		Odd Fellow	D. Williams		J. J. Merrill	
7th		Malvern	S. Jones		George H. Rice	
8th		Early Light	W. James		Frank B. Harper	
9th		Dan K.	McGrath		Johnson & Mills	
10th		Lisbon	Douglass		Daniel Swigert	
11th		Headlight	Shelton		L. B. Field	

== Payout ==
The winner received a purse of $3,300. The second-place finisher received $200.
