= Vespa (horse) =

British-bred Thoroughbred racehorse

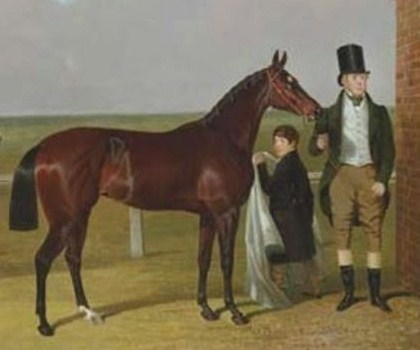
- Vespa with her owner Sir Mark Wood by John Frederick Herring, Sr.
- Sire: Muley
- Grandsire: Orville
- Dam: Miss Wasp
- Damsire: Waxy
- Sex: Mare
- Foaled: 1830
- Country: United Kingdom of Great Britain and Ireland
- Colour: Brown
- Breeder: Sir Mark Wood, 2nd Baronet
- Owner: Sir Mark Wood
- Trainer: H Scott
- Record: 10:5-2-1

Major wins
- Oaks Stakes (1833); Oatlands Stakes (1834); King's Plate at Newmarket (1834); Jockey Club Plate (1834); King's Plate at Chelmsford (1834)

Vespa (foaled 1830) was a British Thoroughbred racehorse and broodmare who won the classic Oaks Stakes at Epsom Downs Racecourse in 1833. The filly's win at Epsom, a 50/1 upset, was the only success in her first two seasons of racing. She produced her best form as a four-year-old when she won four times, including three important races at Newmarket Racecourse. At the end of her British racing career she was sold and exported to Hungary.

== Background ==
Vespa was a brown mare with a white star and one white foot, bred by her owner Sir Mark Wood. Her sire Muley was a son of the Derby-winning mare Eleanor, and won two races as a five-year-old at Newmarket in 1815. His early stud career was disappointing and he had been covering half-bred mares for some time before being relocated to Underley Hall in Westmorland where he had considerable success. In addition to Vespa, he sired the Classic winners Margrave (St Leger) and Little Wonder (Epsom Derby). Vespa's dam, Miss Wasp, had previously produced the 1817 2000 Guineas winner Manfred. Miss Wasp was twenty-three years old when Vespa was foaled and died four years later.

== Racing career ==
=== 1832: two-year-old season ===
Until 1913 there was no requirement for British racehorses to have names, and many horses were known by the name of their owner or their pedigree. The filly who would become known as Vespa began her racing career as "Sir M. Wood's br. f. by Muley, out of Miss Wasp" in the Clearwell Stakes at Newmarket on 17 October. She was not among the favourites and finished unplaced behind Lord Orford's colt Clearwell who went on to win the following season's 2000 Guineas.

=== 1833: three-year-old season ===
Sir Mark Wood named his filly Vespa (Latin for Wasp) before the start of the 1833 season. She made her first appearance of the year on 25 April when he contested the 1000 Guineas over the Rowley Mile course at Newmarket. She was well-fancied for the race, starting 5/2 second favourite and finished third of the ten runners behind Tarantella and Falernia. On 24 May Vespa was moved up in distance to contest the Oaks Stakes at Epsom. The race attracted a field of nineteen runners, with Tarantella being made 2/1 favourite, whilst Vespa was ignored in the market and started at odds of 50/1. Ridden by Jem Chapple, Vespa was always well-placed before moving up to contest the lead a furlong from the finish. With most of the other fillies dropping back, Vespa and the Duke of Grafton's filly Octave contested the closing stages "with much severity" before the outsidiled by a neck, with Revelry in third and Tarantella unplaced. She became the longest-priced winner of the race and her odds were not equaled until Jet Ski Lady won at 50/1 in 1991.

Vespa did not race again until the autumn meetings at Newmarket. In a match race over the Ditch Mile course on 15 October, she was beaten by John Forth's filly Marpessa for a prize of 200 guineas. On 30 October she ran in a ten furlong handicap race in which she carried a weight of 111 pounds and finished fourth of the eight runners behind Revelry.

=== 1833: four-year-old season ===
Vespa remained in training as a four-year-old and began her third season at Newmarket's Craven meeting on 15 April. Contesting the Oatlands Stakes a handicap race over the two-mile "Ditch In" course, she started at odds of 8/1 and won from the Duke of Portland's horse Trustee, with the unplaced horses including the Oaks and Ascot Gold Cup winner Galata. At the next Newmarket meeting, Vespa was moved up in distance to run in a King's Plate for female horses over the three and a half mile Round Course. Ridden by Jem Chapple she defeated her two opponents, Chantilly and Revelry very easily ("almost in a canter"). On 15 May Vespa was entered for the Jockey Club Plate, a race over the four mile Beacon Course which was restricted to horses owned by members of the Jockey Club. When no other horses appeared to oppose her, Vespa was allowed to walk over the course to claim the prize.

Vespa's winning run ended at the Newmarket July meeting where she was ridden by Jem Robinson and started odds-on favourite for a £50 weight-for-age race over the Ditch-In course. Robinson left his challenge very late and despite finishing very strongly the filly was beaten a head by the Duke of Rutland's Amadillo, a three-year-old colt. In July, Vespa raced away from Newmarket for the first time since her Oaks win when he was sent to Chelmsford Racecourse in Essex. Her objective was a King's Plate run in a series of two-mile heats, with the prize going to the first horse to win twice. She won the first heat against her rival Infatuation, and claimed the prize when her opponent was withdrawn from the second heat.

== Stud record ==
Vespa was sold to Count József Hunyady de Kéthely in October 1834 and exported to Hungary. She never returned and none of her foals were recorded by the British General Stud Book.

== Pedigree ==
Pedigree of Vespa (GB), brown mare, 1830
Sire Muley (GB) 1810	Orville; 1799	Beningbrough	King Fergus^
Sire Muley (GB) 1810	Orville; 1799	Beningbrough	Fenwick's Herod mare^
Sire Muley (GB) 1810	Orville; 1799	Evelina	Highflyer^
Sire Muley (GB) 1810	Orville; 1799	Evelina	Teramagant
Sire Muley (GB) 1810	Eleanor; 1798	Whiskey	Saltram^
Sire Muley (GB) 1810	Eleanor; 1798	Whiskey	Calash^
Sire Muley (GB) 1810	Eleanor; 1798	Young Giantess	Diomed
Sire Muley (GB) 1810	Eleanor; 1798	Young Giantess	Giantess
Dam Miss Wasp (GB) 1807	Waxy; 1790	Potoooooooo	Eclipse*^
Dam Miss Wasp (GB) 1807	Waxy; 1790	Potoooooooo	Sportsmistress
Dam Miss Wasp (GB) 1807	Waxy; 1790	Maria	Herod*^
Dam Miss Wasp (GB) 1807	Waxy; 1790	Maria	Lisette
Dam Miss Wasp (GB) 1807	Trumpetta; 1789	Trumpator	Conductor
Dam Miss Wasp (GB) 1807	Trumpetta; 1789	Trumpator	Brunette
Dam Miss Wasp (GB) 1807	Trumpetta; 1789	Peggy	Herod*^
Dam Miss Wasp (GB) 1807	Trumpetta; 1789	Peggy	Snap mare (Family:10)

*^ Vespa is inbred 5S x 5S x 5S x 4D x 4D to the stallion Herod, meaning that he appears fifth generation thrice (via Fenwick's Herod mare, Highflyer, and Calash)^ on the sire side of his pedigree and fourth generation twice on the dam side of his pedigree.

*^ Vespa is inbred 5S x 5S x 4D to the stallion Eclipse, meaning that he appears fifth generation twice (via King Fergus and Saltram)^ on the sire side of his pedigree and fourth generation once on the dam side of his pedigree.
