= Garret Lewis =

Black American jockey, Kentucky Derby winner

Horse racing career
- Sport: Thoroughbred racing
- Career wins: 1880 Kentucky Derby, Phoenix Stakes

Significant horses
- Fonso, Bravo

Garret Davis Lewis (1862/3 – 1880) was an African-American Thoroughbred racing jockey best known for riding the horse Fonso to its win in the 1880 Kentucky Derby.

== Early life and career ==
He was born enslaved in Fayette County, Kentucky, in 1862, three years before the end of slavery in Kentucky. Eight years later the family had moved to Hutchison Station, Kentucky, where his father owned a farm worth $2,000. By 1880, Lewis, his father and his brother, who would become the Derby-winning Jockey, Isaac Lewis, were all working with horses. Garret began racing for Byron McClelland when he was about sixteen years old and formed a professional bond with the well-known horseman. He also jockeyed for J.S. Shawhan, Fonso's owner. He and Fonso won the Derby on May 18, 1880, and just a few weeks later he was badly injured in an accident on June 8 during the Grand Gala Week races at the St. Louis Fairgrounds racetrack when his horse stumbled and fell. He went down with it, as well as two other horses and their jockeys. The horses escaped injury but one jockey had internal injuries, one had a broken arm and Lewis was assessed at the time as only badly bruised. Despite this, he went on to race a few more times in Chicago before the injuries he had received in May became fatal. He was eighteen when he died and he was publicly declared to be extraordinarily trustworthy for his young age.

== Misidentification ==
The winner of the 1880 Derby has been identified in some sources as George Garret Lewis. The Daily Racing Form also conflated him with two other Derby winners: his brother, Isaac, who rode Montrose to victory in 1887, and an unrelated jockey, Oliver Lewis, the first Derby winner, who rode Aristides. However, his correct name is carried in newspapers of the time and in the censuses.
