= Little Wonder (horse) =

British-bred Thoroughbred racehorse

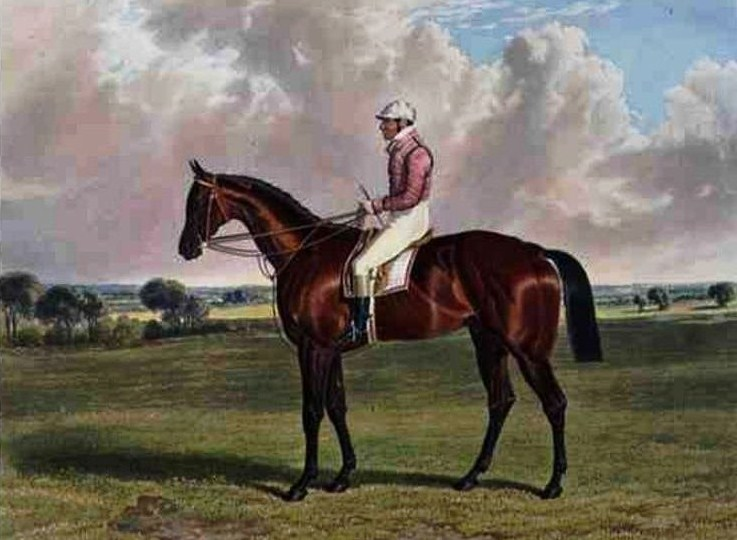
- Little Wonder
- Sire: Muley
- Grandsire: Orville
- Dam: Lacerta
- Damsire: Zodiac
- Sex: Stallion
- Foaled: 1837
- Country: United Kingdom of Great Britain and Ireland
- Colour: Brown
- Breeder: Alexander Nowell
- Owner: David Robertson
- Trainer: John Forth
- Record: 8:1-2-3

Major wins
- Epsom Derby (1840)

Little Wonder (1837–1843) was a British Thoroughbred racehorse. In a career that lasted from September 1839 to September 1842 he ran eight times and won only one race. That race, however, was the 1840 Epsom Derby which he won as a 50/1 outsider. Little Wonder was one of the smallest Thoroughbreds to win a major race, standing less than 15 hands high. During his career, there were rumours that he was a "ringer", foaled in 1836 but the allegations were never substantiated. He was briefly retired after being injured in a race in 1842 and died of colic in 1843 while still in training.

== Background ==
Little Wonder, a "beautifully brilliant bay" horse who stood 14.3½ hands high was bred by Alexander Nowell at Underley Hall near Kirkby Lonsdale in Westmoreland where his sire Muley was based. Muley was a son of the Derby-winning mare Eleanor and won two races as a five-year-old at Newmarket in 1815. His early stud career was disappointing and he had been covering half-bred mares for some time before being bought by Nowell and relocated to Underley where he had considerable success. In addition to Little Wonder, he sired the Classic winners Margrave (St Leger) and Vespa (Epsom Oaks).

Little Wonder was sent as a yearling to the Doncaster sales where he was bought for 45 guineas by David Robertson. He was sent into training with John Forth, who gave the colt his name, at Michelgrove near Angmering in Sussex.

== Racing career ==
=== 1839: two-year-old season ===
Little Wonder's racing career began at Newmarket in autumn. He finished unplaced behind Wardan in the Tuesday Two Year Old Plate at the Second October Meeting. In the Houghton meeting in late October he showed improved form when starting at odds of 4/1 and finishing second of the eight runners to Assassin in the Nursery Stakes. The result was creditable as he was carrying eight pounds more than the winner.

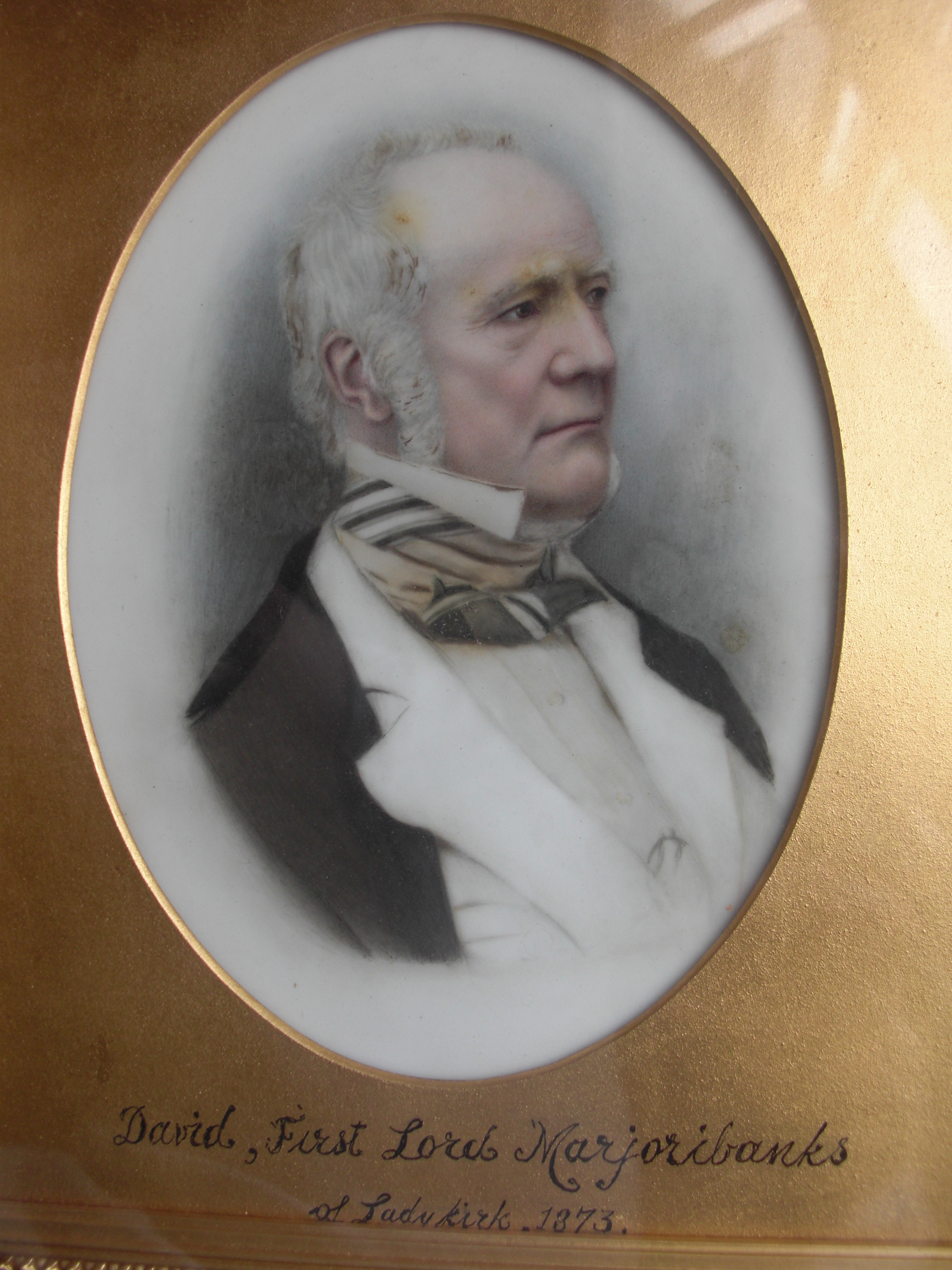
Little Wonder's owner, David Robertson, who became Lord Marjoribanks in 1873.

=== 1840: three-year-old season ===
At Epsom on 3 June Little Wonder started at odds of 50/1 for the Derby, in which he was ridden by a little-known and inexperienced jockey named Macdonald. The weather was fine and sunny and the huge crowd included the Queen and Prince Albert. Launcelot, trained by John Scott and ridden by his brother Bill started favourite at 9/4. In the race, Macdonald settled Little Wonder in fifth or sixth place in the early stages before moving him up to third on the turn into the straight. Most of the runners were already struggling as the unnamed "Melody colt", Launcelot and Little Wonder pulled clear. While the two fancied colts struggled "very severely" for the lead, Macdonald was "quietly closing" on Little Wonder. Inside the final furlong, Macdonald produced the outsider with "one tremendous rush" along the inside rail to take the lead and win by a length from Launcelot with the Melody colt two lengths further back. Although the result was a huge upset, some commentators pointed out that a strict interpretation of his two-year-old form against Assassin should have led to him being regarded as a serious contender. George Tattersall, in "The Cracks of the Day" wrote that "whilst Launcelot and Melody were fighting for the bone, our little lurcher crept in quietly and carried it off". After the race, Macdonald received a gold-tipped riding-whip from Prince Albert as a testimonial. Robertson's prize money was £3,775, while Forth reportedly took £18,000 in winning bets.

On his only other start of the year, Little Wonder ran on 17 June at Royal Ascot in the two and a half mile Ascot Stakes. Ridden by Nat Flatman, he started 4/6 favourite but finished second, beaten a length by the filly Darkness, to whom he was conceding twenty-four pounds. His defeat confirmed some commentators suspicions that the Derby had been a "falsely-run" race, and Little Wonder a lucky winner.

=== 1842: five-year-old season ===
After an absence of more than two years, Little Wonder reappeared at Goodwood on 29 July 1842. Carrying 126 pounds finished unplaced behind Retriever in the Chesterfield Cup. He was then sent to Doncaster for the inaugural running of the Great Yorkshire Handicap on 12 September. Carrying topweight of 126 pounds he ran a "capital" race to finish third to Galanthus and Disclosure, despite being injured and "much over-weighted".

Whatever injuries Little Wonder sustained cannot have been serious as was sent to race at Kelso in Scotland nine days later. He finished last of the three runners behind Cabrera and Charles the Twelfth in the Roxburgh Gold Cup and then broke down injured again when finishing third in the Border Club Racing Stakes later that afternoon.

=== 1843: six-year-old season ===
Little Wonder's owner, J. Walbran, forfeited the Great St. Wilfred Handicap Stakes in August 1843 at the Ripon Meeting. Little Wonder died at Middleton in the fall of 1843 of inflammation of the bowels. His brother, "The Little Known" did stand as a stallion and sired some horses, though none of any consequence, between 1846 and 1860. At least two pubs, one in Harrogate and one in Northfleet were named in Little Wonder's honour.

== Age and identity ==
There were doubts about Little Wonder's age and identity. When Sir John Astley, a racehorse owner and Steward of the Jockey Club heard that Forth had described Little Wonder as an early foal, he observed that the trainer was correct "for there is little doubt that he was foaled a year earlier than his competitors were." Some modern sources have treated the rumour as a fact, but no official enquiry was made and no objection was ever lodged. By contrast, the victory of the "ringer" Running Rein in the 1844 Derby provoked an immediate objection and a subsequent court case.

In 1841 a five-year-old horse owned by Robertson ran at the Kelso October meeting under the name "The Little Known, brother to Little Wonder". He finished second in the Roxburgh Gold Cup, and was unplaced in the first two heats of the Stand Plate later that afternoon. These races took place during the unexplained two-year hiatus in Little Wonder's racing career.

== Pedigree ==
Pedigree of Little Wonder (GB), chestnut stallion, 1837
Sire Muley (GB) 1810	Orville; 1799	Beningbrough	King Fergus
Sire Muley (GB) 1810	Orville; 1799	Beningbrough	Fenwick's Herod mare
Sire Muley (GB) 1810	Orville; 1799	Evelina	Highflyer*
Sire Muley (GB) 1810	Orville; 1799	Evelina	Teramagant
Sire Muley (GB) 1810	Eleanor; 1798	Whiskey	Saltram
Sire Muley (GB) 1810	Eleanor; 1798	Whiskey	Calash
Sire Muley (GB) 1810	Eleanor; 1798	Young Giantess	Diomed
Sire Muley (GB) 1810	Eleanor; 1798	Young Giantess	Giantess
Dam Lacerta (GB) 1816	Zodiac; 1801	St George	Highflyer*
Dam Lacerta (GB) 1816	Zodiac; 1801	St George	Eclipse mare
Dam Lacerta (GB) 1816	Zodiac; 1801	Abigail	Woodpecker
Dam Lacerta (GB) 1816	Zodiac; 1801	Abigail	Firetail
Dam Lacerta (GB) 1816	Jerboa; 1803	Gohanna	Mercury
Dam Lacerta (GB) 1816	Jerboa; 1803	Gohanna	Dundas' Herod mare
Dam Lacerta (GB) 1816	Jerboa; 1803	Camilla	Trentham
Dam Lacerta (GB) 1816	Jerboa; 1803	Camilla	Coquette (Family:11-c)

* Little Wonder is inbred 4S x 4D to the stallion Highflyer, meaning that he appears fourth generation on the sire side of his pedigree and fourth generation on the dam side of his pedigree.
