= Billy Walker (jockey) =

American jockey

Personal information
- Born: 1860 Versailles, Kentucky
- Died: September 20, 1933 (aged 72–73)
- Resting place: Louisville Cemetery, Louisville, Kentucky
- Occupation: Jockey

Horse racing career
- Sport: Horse racing
- Career wins: Not found

Major racing wins
- Match race (1874); Kentucky Derby (1877)

Significant horses
- Ten Broeck, Baden-Baden
- Updated on March 13, 2007

William Walker (1860 – September 20, 1933) was an American jockey.

Born a slave in near Versailles, Kentucky, Billy Walker was the leading rider at Churchill Downs in the fall racing season of 1875–76 and the spring campaigns of 1876 through 1878. He was the winning rider aboard Ten Broeck in a famous July 4, 1878, match race at Louisville, Kentucky, against the great California mare, Mollie McCarty.

For owner Daniel Swigert and future U.S. Racing Hall of Fame trainer Edward D. Brown, Billy Walker rode Baden-Baden to victory in the 1877 Kentucky Derby. Walker made his fourth and final appearance in the 1896 Derby, finishing seventh. He retired that year but stayed in horse racing as a trainer and as an adviser to renowned breeder, John E. Madden.

He was known to mentor Isaac Murphy, another successful jockey who was also born into slavery during the Civil War.

Billy Walker died in 1933 and was buried at the Louisville Cemetery at the corner of Eastern Parkway and Poplar Level Road. During the 1996 Kentucky Derby Week, Churchill Downs erected a headstone on his previously unmarked grave with an epitaph outlining his career.
