= Ten Broeck (horse) =

American-bred Thoroughbred racehorse

- Sire: Phaeton
- Grandsire: King Tom
- Dam: Fanny Holton
- Damsire: Lexington
- Sex: Stallion
- Foaled: June 29, 1872
- Died: June 28, 1887 (aged 14)
- Country: United States
- Colour: Bay
- Breeder: John Harper
- Owner: Frank B. Harper
- Trainer: Harry Colston
- Record: 30: 23–3–1
- Earnings: $27,550

Major wins
- Phoenix Hotel Stakes (1875); Post Stakes (1875); Merchants' Post Stakes (1875); Maxwell House Stakes (1875); Louisville Cup (1876); Galt House Plate (1876); Bowie Stakes (1877)

Awards
- American Co-Champion Older Male Horse (1876, 1877)

Honours
- National Museum of Racing and Hall of Fame (1982)

Ten Broeck (June 29, 1872 – June 28, 1887) was an American U.S. Racing Hall of Fame Thoroughbred racehorse whose 1878 match race win in Louisville, against the great California mare Mollie McCarty was immortalized in the Kentucky folk song commonly called "Molly and Tenbrooks".

Bred by John Harper at his farm near Midway, Kentucky, Ten Broeck was sired by English import Phaeton, a son of Baron Mayer de Rothschild's stallion King Tom. Ten Broeck's dam was Fannie Holton. On John Harper's death, the horse became the property of his nephew, Frank B. Harper.

Ten Broeck raced once at age two, finishing third in a race for two-year-old colts at Lexington, Kentucky. In 1875, the three-year-old Ten Broeck defeated Aristides to win the Phoenix Hotel Stakes. In May's Kentucky Derby, he moved into second place by the three-quarters of a mile pole but faded to finish fifth behind winner Aristides. Overall, that year Ten Broeck won five of his nine starts and continued to improve at age four, taking seven of eight races while setting a new world record time for a four-mile race on dirt. At age five, of his ten starts he won nine and finished second once. That only defeat came to Pierre Lorillard IV's future Hall of Fame colt, Parole, in the Baltimore Special.

With sixteen wins and two seconds in eighteen starts during his last two racing seasons, Ten Broeck was brought back to race twice more in 1878 and won both times. Ridden by Billy Walker, he won a much-talked-about match race victory over the Californian star Mollie McCarty. The story of this race is recounted in the lyrics of the Kentucky folk song Molly and Tenbrooks.

Retired to stud duty, Ten Broeck met with modest success. He sired 1885 Travers Stakes winner Bersan, and the 1884 and 1886 Tennessee Derby winners Ten Strike and Jim Gray. He was also the sire of the filly Ten Penny, who won the 1888 Kentucky Oaks, and Tolu, winner of the 1884 Alabama Stakes. He is the grandsire of 1904 Kentucky Derby winner Elwood.

Ten Broeck died in 1887 (the same year the great Kincsem of Hungary died) and is buried at Nantura Stock Farm (the farm was named by its owner, Uncle John Harper, for the dam of Longfellow) in Midway, Kentucky. According to the National Sporting Library, his headstone was the first ever erected for a Thoroughbred in the state of Kentucky. In 1982, Ten Broeck was inducted in the National Museum of Racing and Hall of Fame.

== Sire line tree ==
- Ten Broeck
  - Ten Strike
  - Bersan
    - Sacket
  - Jim Gray
  - Free Knight
    - Elwood
