= Grenada (horse) =

American Thoroughbred racehorse

- Sire: King Alfonso
- Grandsire: Phaeton
- Dam: Mattie Gross
- Damsire: Lexington
- Sex: Stallion
- Foaled: 1877
- Country: United States
- Colour: Bay
- Breeder: Woodburn Stud (A. J. Alexander)
- Owner: George L. Lorillard
- Trainer: R. Wyndham Walden
- Earnings: $38,583

Major wins
- Windsor Hotel Stakes (1879); Lorillard Stakes (1880); Potomac Stakes (1880); Travers Stakes (1880); Jerome Handicap (1880); Coney Island Derby (1880); Dixie Stakes (1880) American Classics wins: Preakness Stakes (1880); Belmont Stakes (1880)
- Last updated on 2019-04-25

Grenada was an American Thoroughbred racehorse. He won the 1880 Preakness Stakes, Belmont Stakes, and Travers Stakes. He is one of only seven horses to have won these three races.

== Background ==
Grenada was bred in Kentucky at Woodburn Stud by Alexander John Alexander. He was sired by King Alfonso, a successful sire of several stakes winners. His dam was Mattie Gross, a daughter of the famous Lexington. When he was a yearling, Grenada was sold at the 1878 Woodburn yearling sale for $1,300 to George L. Lorillard.

== Racing career ==
=== Two-year-old season ===
Grenada started 11 times as a two-year-old. He won the Club Purse at Long Branch, as well as the Windsor Hotel Stakes. He came second six times, and placed third once. He was unplaced in his remaining two races.

=== Three-year-old season ===
Grenada started 19 times as a three-year-old, winning ten races. He started the season by winning the Potomac Stakes on May 19. Nine days later, Grenada ran in the Preakness Stakes. Ridden by jockey Lloyd Hughes, Grenada beat out the field of four other horses. He came second in the Withers Stakes on June 3, losing by a head, before running in the Belmont Stakes on the 8th. Once again ridden by Lloyd Hughes, Grenada was the favorite, and won the race against three others. He went on to win several more races in a row, the Lorillard Stakes on June 12, the Coney Island Derby on June 24, the Travers Stakes on July 17 (winning by a length), the Atlantic Handicap on August 21, and the Jerome Stakes on October 2. He came second in a race on October 7, but won the Dixie Stakes on October 19. He ran a dead heat in the Breckenridge Stakes with Glidelia. Despite this string of victories, Grenada did not run up to his usual standard in a number of races, and lost several as a result.

=== Later career ===
Grenada started six times as a four-year-old, winning four races. He won the Peyton Handicap, came third in the Baltimore Cup, and won the Jockey Club Handicap, and two Handicap Sweepstakes. He was unplaced in the Club Purse, and injured his foot during the race. He was never the same following the injury. Grenada raced only three times as a five-year-old, coming second in the Welter Cup and Westchester Cup, and not placing at all in the Members Cup. Grenada was retired from racing shortly afterwards. Overall, he started 39 times during his career, winning 16 races.

== Stud Career ==
After his retirement from racing, Grenada stood at stud in Ohio during the 1883 season. His stud fee was $30.

== Pedigree ==
Pedigree of Grenada
Sire King Alfonso 1872	Phaeton 1865	King Tom	Harkaway
Sire King Alfonso 1872	Phaeton 1865	King Tom	Pocahontas*
Sire King Alfonso 1872	Phaeton 1865	Merry Sunshine	Storm
Sire King Alfonso 1872	Phaeton 1865	Merry Sunshine	Falstaff Mare
Sire King Alfonso 1872	Capitola 1858	Vandal	Glencoe*
Sire King Alfonso 1872	Capitola 1858	Vandal	Tranby Mare
Sire King Alfonso 1872	Capitola 1858	Margrave Mare	Margrave
Sire King Alfonso 1872	Capitola 1858	Margrave Mare	Mistletoe
Dam Mattie Gross 1860	Lexington 1850	Boston	Timoleon
Dam Mattie Gross 1860	Lexington 1850	Boston	Sister to Tuckahoe
Dam Mattie Gross 1860	Lexington 1850	Alice Carneal	Sarpedon
Dam Mattie Gross 1860	Lexington 1850	Alice Carneal	Rowena
Dam Mattie Gross 1860	Eclipse Mare 1844	American Eclipse	Duroc
Dam Mattie Gross 1860	Eclipse Mare 1844	American Eclipse	Millers Damsel
Dam Mattie Gross 1860	Eclipse Mare 1844	Nell	Orphan
Dam Mattie Gross 1860	Eclipse Mare 1844	Nell	Buzzard Mare

* Grenada is inbred 5S x 4S to the stallion Glencoe, meaning that he appears fifth generation (via Pocahontas) and fourth generation on the sire side of his pedigree.
