= Abraham Buford II =

American Confederate Army general

Abraham Buford
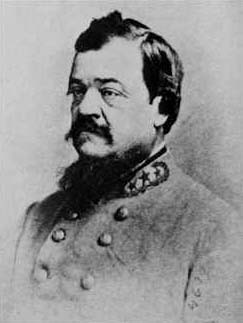
- Brigadier General Abraham Buford
- Born: January 18, 1820; Woodford County, Kentucky
- Died: June 9, 1884 (aged 64); Danville, Indiana
- Burial place: Lexington Cemetery; Lexington, Kentucky
- Military career
- Allegiance: United States of America; Confederate States of America
- Branch: United States Army; Confederate States Army
- Service years: 1841–1854 (USA); 1862–1865 (CSA)
- Rank: Captain (USA); Brigadier General (CSA)
- Commands: Buford's Cavalry Brigade; Buford's Div., Forrest's Cavalry Corps
- Conflicts: Mexican–American War: Battle of Buena Vista; American Civil War: Battle of Stones River; Battle of Champion Hill; Battle of Brice's Crossroads; Third Battle of Murfreesboro; Hood's Retreat; Richland Creek; Second Battle of Franklin; Wilson's Raid
- Other work: Thoroughbred racehorse owner/breeder

Abraham Buford II (January 18, 1820 – June 9, 1884) was an American soldier, Confederate brigadier general, and landowner. After serving in the United States Army during the Mexican–American War, Buford joined the Confederate States Army in 1862 and served as a cavalry general in the Western Theater of the American Civil War. After the war, he retired to his native Kentucky and became a thoroughbred horse breeder.

== Biography ==
Abraham Buford was born in Woodford County, Kentucky, the son of Frances W. Kirtley and her husband, William B. Buford (1781–1848). He was named for his great-uncle Abraham who was a Continental Army officer during the American Revolutionary War. He descended from a Huguenot family named Beaufort who fled persecution in France and settled in England before emigrating to America in 1635. His cousins, John and Napoleon Bonaparte Buford, who grew up nearby, were generals in the Union Army during the Civil War.

Buford studied at Centre College before entering the United States Military Academy at West Point, New York, in 1837. Graduating in 1841, as a second-lieutenant with the First dragoons from 1842 through 1846, he did Frontier duty in the Kansas Territory and the Indian Territory. He then served in the Mexican–American War in which he was appointed brevet captain for bravery at the Battle of Buena Vista. When that war ended, he was dispatched for further duty on the Frontier and in 1848 was part of the Santa Fe Trail expedition. In 1849, Buford escorted the mail from Santa Fe, New Mexico, to the east, using, in part, the new Cherokee Trail. He was then sent to the Army's cavalry school in Carlisle, Pennsylvania, but in October 1854 he resigned his commission and returned to his native Kentucky where his family owned a farm property near Versailles in his native Woodford County.

=== Civil War ===
Following the outbreak of the American Civil War, like his native state, Buford tried to stay out of the Civil War and succeeded in doing so for well over a year. In September 1862, during Confederate General Braxton Bragg's invasion of Kentucky, Buford joined the Confederate States Army. He helped raise and took command of a Kentucky brigade and on September 2, 1862, was commissioned Brigadier General. Among his missions, Buford covered General Braxton Bragg's retreat from Kentucky, was part of the Vicksburg Campaign under General Loring, fought in the Battle of Champion Hill, a raid on Paducah, KY on 25 March 1864 under Maj. Gen. Nathan B. Forrest, the Battle of Brice's Crossroads and was wounded on December 24, 1864, at Richland Creek during the Battle of Nashville when he covered Lt. Gen. Hood's retreat following the Confederate Army's loss. In Alabama in February, 1865, he commanded a division in Forrest's Cavalry Corps until the surrender at Selma following Wilson's Raid.

When the war ended in 1865, Brigadier General Buford returned to his farm in Kentucky where he became a leading breeder of Thoroughbreds.

== Bosque Bonita Farm ==
Abe Buford named his Woodford County farm Bosque Bonita (Spanish for "Beautiful Woods"), a place The New York Times would call the "most princely residence in the Bluegrass region." It was here that future jockey Billy Walker was born into slavery in 1860. He went on to ride Baden-Baden to victory in the 1877 Kentucky Derby.

Beginning in 1852, the stallion Sovereign stood at stud at Bosque Bonita, developing into an influential sire. The next year, Abe Buford was part of a syndicate with Richard Ten Broeck, Captain Willa Viley and Junius R. Ward, who bought the then three-year-old colt, Lexington. In 1858 Lexington was sold to Robert A. Alexander of Woodburn Stud for $15,000 in 1858, reportedly the then highest price ever paid for an American horse.

Buford also owned, raced, or bred a number of successful horses including Nellie Gray, Enquirer, Crossland, and Versailles. Mannie Gray, whom Thoroughbred Heritage calls "one of the most influential American mares in breeding history," was owned and raced by Buford who sold her to fellow Kentuckian, Major Barak G. Thomas of Dixiana Farm. In 1866, Leamington's new owner, Canadian Roderick Cameron, sent him to stand at stud at Bosque Bonita for the season. Although Leamington covered just thirteen mares that year, he produced an outstanding crop of foals, including, Anna Mace, Enquirer, Longfellow, Lynchburg, Lyttleton, and Miss Alice.

In 1875, General George Custer came to Bosque Bonita Farm to buy cavalry remounts before the Battle of Little Big Horn.

=== Later owners ===
Since Abe Buford's time, Bosque Bonita has been owned by such prominent horsemen as John H. Morris who had trained horses for George J. Long's Bashford Manor Stable for many years and who operated Woodburn Stud on a long-term lease beginning in 1905. John Morris still owned Bosque Bonita in the 1940s.

Fritz Hawn bought Bosque Bonita Farm in the fall of 1977 from Robert A. Alexander. Two years later he sold the property to William Stamps Farish III who renamed it Lane's End Farm. Some of the famous horses who stood at the farm in recent times and are buried there include Bally Ache (1957–1960), Sovereign Dancer (1975–1994), and Fappiano (1977–1990).

== Family tragedies ==
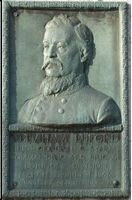
A relief of Brigadier General Abraham Buford by Theo Alice Ruggles Kitson at Vicksburg National Military Park.

During the 1870s Abe Buford suffered a series of financial reversals that forced him into bankruptcy with the resulting loss of Bosque Bonita Farm to his creditors. In addition, he suffered a devastating personal loss when his only son, William A. Buford, died at age twenty-three in 1872. He lost his wife Amanda Harris Buford in 1879 and on March 26 of that same year, his brother, Colonel Thomas Buford of Henry County, Kentucky, shot and killed Judge John Milton Elliott in Frankfort, Kentucky. Tom Buford surrendered to police and was jailed pending trial. Abe Buford came to his brother's aid and spent a great deal of money on legal fees for his defense. On appeal of a guilty verdict, Thomas Buford would eventually be found not guilty by reason of insanity and was sent to the Anchorage, Kentucky psychiatric hospital.

In his final years, Abe Buford made a living working for racing newspapers. In 1884, following his brother Thomas's much publicized escape from the insane asylum with some newspaper headlines saying he was "thirsting for blood", Abe Buford sought some peace and went to visit his nephew Benjamin T. Buford in Danville, Indiana. There, in his bedroom, a very depressed Abraham Buford took his own life. His remains were sent back to Kentucky where he was buried in the Lexington Cemetery.

The Brigadier General Abraham Buford Relief was erected November 21, 1911, on South Confederate Avenue in Vicksburg, Mississippi.

== See also ==
- List of American Civil War generals (Confederate)
