= Coney Island Derby =

- Class: Discontinued stakes
- Location: Sheepshead Bay Race Track; Sheepshead Bay, Brooklyn, New York
- Inaugurated: 1880-1888
- Race type: Thoroughbred - Flat racing

Race information
- Distance: 1½ miles (12 furlongs)
- Surface: Dirt
- Track: left-handed
- Qualification: Three-year-olds

The Coney Island Derby was an American Thoroughbred horse race run annually between 1880 and 1888 at Sheepshead Bay Race Track in Sheepshead Bay, Brooklyn, New York. Open to three-year-old horses, it was contested at a mile and a half (12 furlongs) on dirt.

In 1881, future Hall of Fame inductee Hindoo won both the Coney Island Derby and the Kentucky Derby. That feat would be accomplished again in 1885 by the gelding Joe Cotton.

== Records ==
Speed record:

- 2:37 flat, Runnymede (1882)

Most wins by a jockey:

- 4 - Jim McLaughlin (1881, 1882, 1885, 1887)

Most wins by a trainer:

- 3 - James G. Rowe Sr. (1881, 1882, 1888)

Most wins by an owner:

- 3 - Dwyer Brothers Stable (1881, 1882, 1887)

== Winners ==
Year	Winner	Jockey	Trainer	Owner	Time
1888	Prince Royal	Edward Garrison	James G. Rowe Sr.	August Belmont	2:39.25
1887	Hanover	Jim McLaughlin	Frank McCabe	Dwyer Brothers Stable	2:44.50
1886	Ban Fox	William Hayward Jr.	Jim Murphy	James Ben Ali Haggin	2:38.75
1885	Joe Cotton	Jim McLaughlin	Abraham Perry	James T. Williams	2:41.50
1884	Greystone	Oliver Lewis	Byron McClelland	William L. Scott	2:51.00
1883	Barnes	William Hayward Jr.		Preakness Stables	2:40.75
1882	Runnymede	Jim McLaughlin	James G. Rowe Sr.	Dwyer Brothers Stable	2:37.00
1881	Hindoo	Jim McLaughlin	James G. Rowe Sr.	Dwyer Brothers Stable	2:46.50
1880	Grenada	Lloyd Hughes	R. Wyndham Walden	George L. Lorillard	2:40.50
