= 1885 Kentucky Derby =

Horse race

11th Kentucky Derby
- Kentucky Derby
- Grade I stakes race
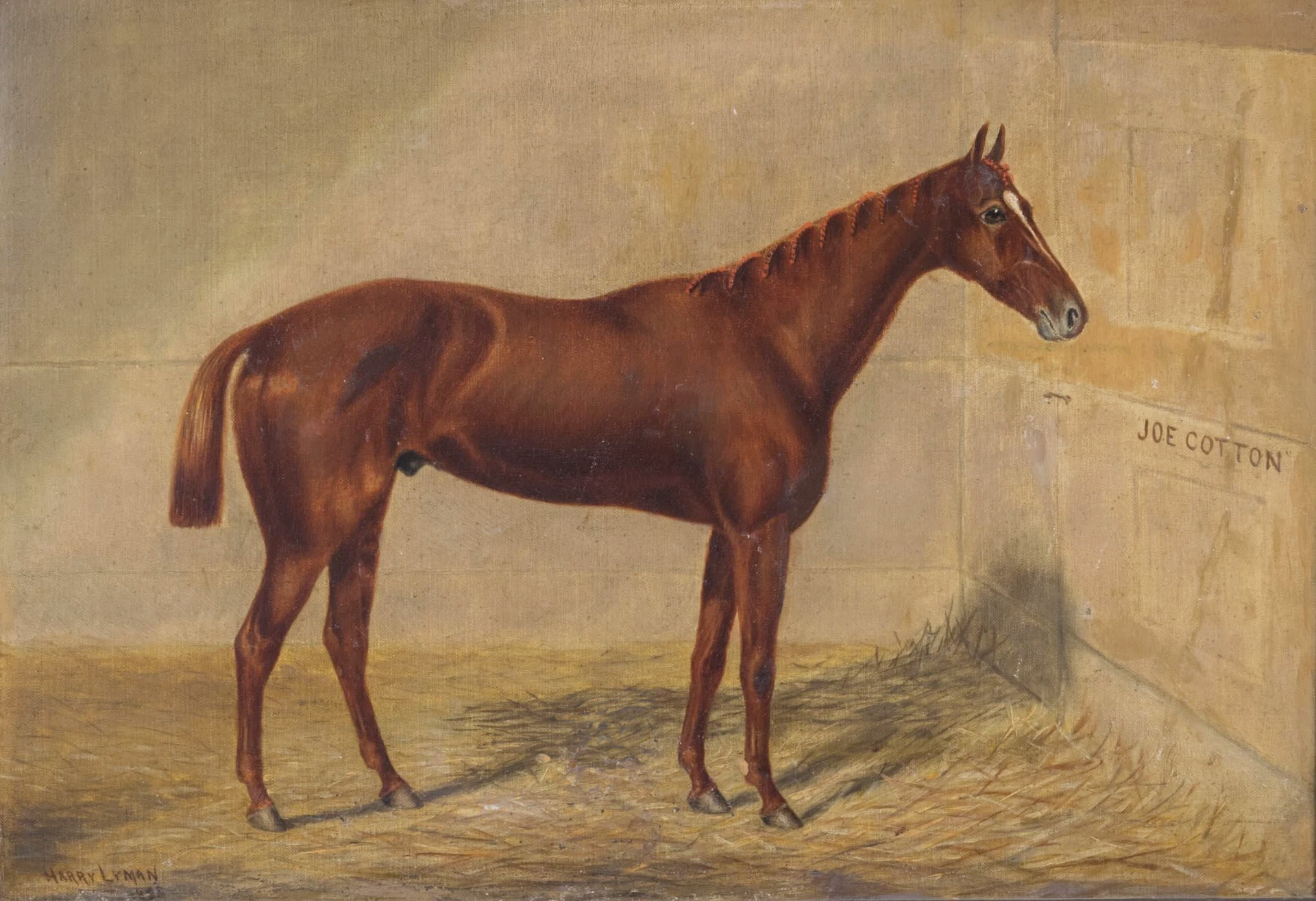
- Location: Churchill Downs
- Date: May 14, 1885
- Winning horse: Joe Cotton
- Jockey: Erskine Henderson
- Trainer: Abraham Perry
- Owner: James T. Williams
- Surface: Dirt

The 1885 Kentucky Derby was the 11th running of the Kentucky Derby. The race took place on May 14, 1885.

== Full results ==
Finished	Post	Horse	Jockey	Trainer	Owner	Time / behind
1st	5	Joe Cotton	Erskine "Babe" Henderson	Abraham Perry	James T. Williams	2:37.25
2nd	8	Bersan	Ed West	Green B. Morris	Green B. Morris & James D. Patton	
3rd	10	Ten Booker	John Stoval		Milton Young	
4th	3	Favor	Thompkins		Green B. Morris & James D. Patton	
5th	6	Irish Pat	Isaac Murphy		Edward C. Corrigan	
6th	11	Keokuk	C. Richard Fishburn		W. P. Hunt	
7th	9	Clay Pate	T. Withers	H. Eugene Leigh	R. C. Pate	
8th	13	Thistle	Harry Blaylock		P. G. Speth	
9th	7	Playfair	W. Conkling		George W. Darden & Co.	
10th	12	Lord Coleridge	Lloyd Hughes		William Cottrill	

== Payout ==
Post	Horse	Win	Place	Show
	Joe Cotton	$ 9.30	8.80	
	Bersan		$7.40	

- The winner received a purse of $4,630.
- Second place received $200.
