= Fonso =

American-bred Thoroughbred racehorse

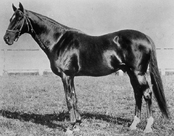
- Sire: King Alfonso
- Grandsire: Phaeton
- Dam: Weatherwitch
- Damsire: Weatherbit
- Sex: Stallion
- Foaled: 1877
- Country: United States
- Colour: Chestnut
- Breeder: A. J. Alexander
- Owner: John Snell Shawhan
- Trainer: Tice Hutsell
- Record: 12: 5-3-2
- Earnings: $8,175

Major wins
- Maiden Stakes (1879); Colt Stakes (1879); Phoenix Stakes (1880) American Classic Race wins: Kentucky Derby (1880)

Fonso (1877 – September 3, 1900) was an American Thoroughbred racehorse and was the winner of the 1880 Kentucky Derby under jockey Garret Lewis. Fonso was bred in Kentucky and was a chestnut colt sired by King Alfonso out of the mare Weatherwitch.

Fonso won the Phoenix Stakes as a three-year-old over Luke Blackburn who finished third, but is best remembered for going on to beat the favored Kimball in the 1880 Kentucky Derby. The track was particularly dry and the dust, up to 5 inches (13 cm) thick, Fonso kicked up obscured the path for the other contenders. Fonso finished the race with a one length lead at a time of 2:37.50 and won $3800. The owner of Kimball called a foul in the race against Fonso, but the placing was not altered. Fonso had a career record of 12 starts, 5 wins, 3 places and 2 shows.

Fonso died at the age of 22 or 23 while standing stud at the Oakwood Stud Farm in Lexington, Kentucky, on September 3, 1900. His death also reported in an article in 1903. His most notable offspring was the mare Fondling (br. 1886, out of Kitty Heron by Chillicothe), who produced the champion filly Imp.

== Pedigree ==
Pedigree of Fondo
Sire King Alfonso 1872	Phaeton 1865	King Tom	Harkaway
Sire King Alfonso 1872	Phaeton 1865	King Tom	Pocahontas*
Sire King Alfonso 1872	Phaeton 1865	Merry Sunshine	Storm
Sire King Alfonso 1872	Phaeton 1865	Merry Sunshine	Falstaff Mare
Sire King Alfonso 1872	Capitola 1858	Vandal	Glencoe*
Sire King Alfonso 1872	Capitola 1858	Vandal	Tranby Mare
Sire King Alfonso 1872	Capitola 1858	Margrave Mare	Margrave
Sire King Alfonso 1872	Capitola 1858	Margrave Mare	Mistletoe
Dam Weatherwitch 1858	Weatherbit 1842	Sheet Anchor	Lottery
Dam Weatherwitch 1858	Weatherbit 1842	Sheet Anchor	Morgiana
Dam Weatherwitch 1858	Weatherbit 1842	Miss Letty	Priam
Dam Weatherwitch 1858	Weatherbit 1842	Miss Letty	Orville Mare
Dam Weatherwitch 1858	Birdcatcher Mare 1850	Birdcatcher	Sir Hercules
Dam Weatherwitch 1858	Birdcatcher Mare 1850	Birdcatcher	Guiccioli
Dam Weatherwitch 1858	Birdcatcher Mare 1850	Hetman Platoff Mare	Hetman Platoff
Dam Weatherwitch 1858	Birdcatcher Mare 1850	Hetman Platoff Mare	Whim

* Fonso is inbred 5S x 4S to the stallion Glencoe, meaning that he appears fifth generation (via Pocahontas) and fourth generation on the sire side of his pedigree.
