= Bersan =

American thoroughbred racehorse

- Sire: Ten Broeck
- Grandsire: Phaeton
- Dam: Sallie M.
- Damsire: Longfellow
- Sex: Stallion
- Foaled: 1882
- Died: 1904 (aged 21–22)
- Country: United States
- Colour: Bay
- Breeder: Frank B. Harper
- Owner: Green B. Morris
- Trainer: Green B. Morris

Major wins
- Clark Handicap (1885); Foxhall Stakes (1884); Hindoo Stakes (1885); Phoenix Stakes (1885); Twin City Handicap (1885); Travers Stakes (1885); National Hotel Handicap (1886); Riggs Rouse Stakes (1886)

Awards
- American Co-Champion 3-Year-Old Male Horse (1885)
- Last updated on April 12, 2010

Bersan (1882–1904) was an American Thoroughbred Champion racehorse. He was foaled in Kentucky and bred by Frank B. Harper, who also owned his sire Ten Broeck and dam, Sallie M. Green B. Morris purchased Bersan as a yearling for $10,000.

Trained by Morris, as a three-year-old Bersan was one of the best Thoroughbreds racing in the United States. He ran second to Joe Cotton in the 1885 Kentucky Derby and won the Phoenix Hotel Stakes, Clark Handicap, Latonia Derby, and Travers Stakes, among others. His 1885 performances earned Bersan retrospective American Co-Champion Three-Year-Old Male Horse honors.

At age four at the Ivy City Racetrack in Washington, D.C., Bersan won the one and one eight mile National Hotel Handicap and Riggs Rouse Stakes. Then, at the Maryland Jockey Club course in Baltimore, he won a mile and a quarter race for horses of all ages.

On December 18, 1886, Morris sold Bersan at a Lexington, Kentucky sale to prominent breeder Daniel Swigert, who stood him at his Elmendorf Farm. In 1894, Berson was sold to Capt. Kidd. Bersan only produced a few offspring, the most successful of which was Sacket (b. 1895), who won the 1901 American Grand National Steeplechase. He died on July 9, 1904.
