= Midway Historic District (Midway, Kentucky) =

Historic district in Kentucky, United States

- U.S. National Register of Historic Places
- U.S. Historic district
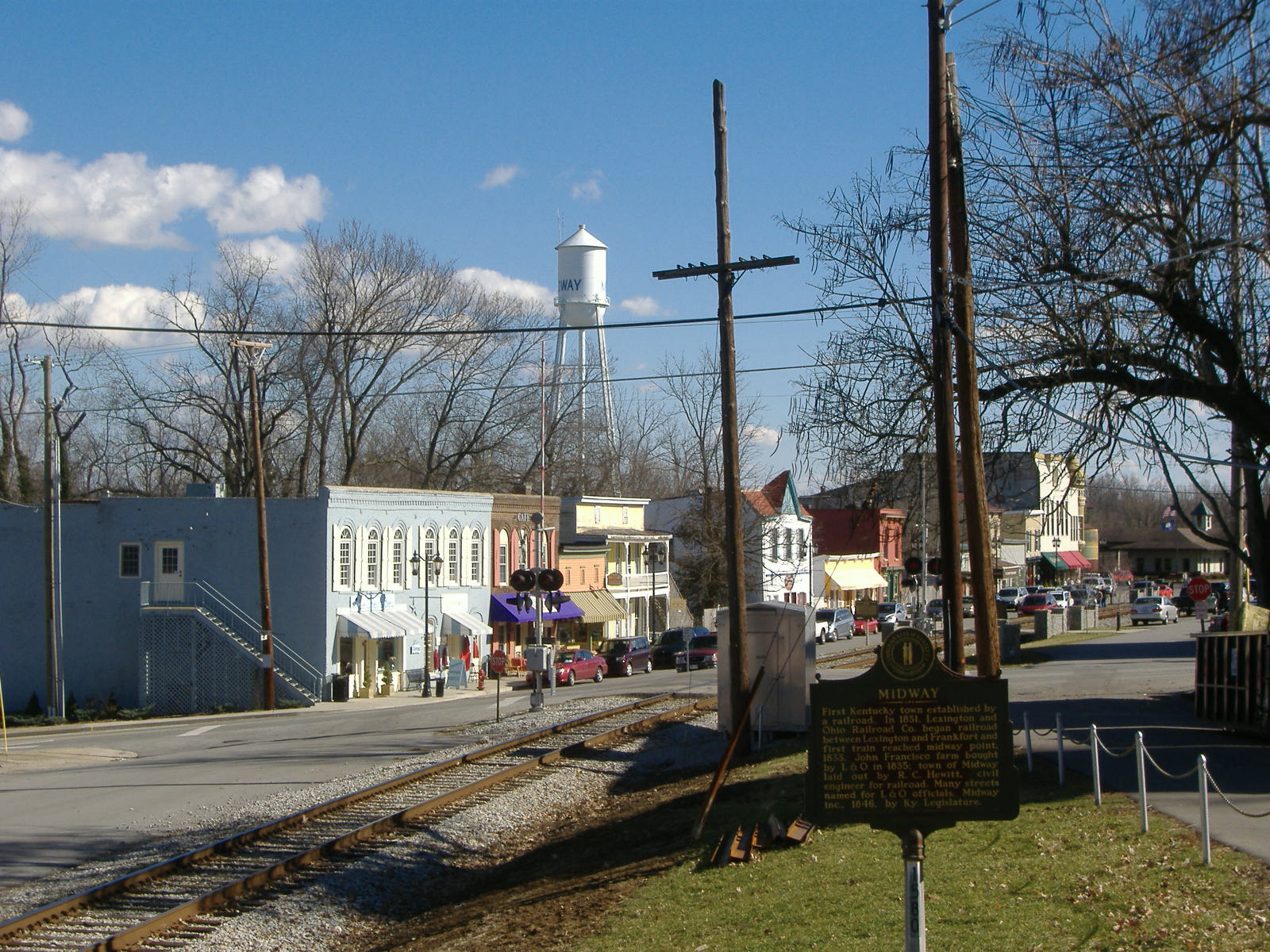
- East side

- Location within Kentucky Location within the United States
- Location: Midway, Kentucky
- Architect: Lacefield, R.W.; Et al.
- Architectural style: Greek Revival, Gothic, Italianate
- NRHP reference No.: 78001415
- Added to NRHP: November 17, 1978

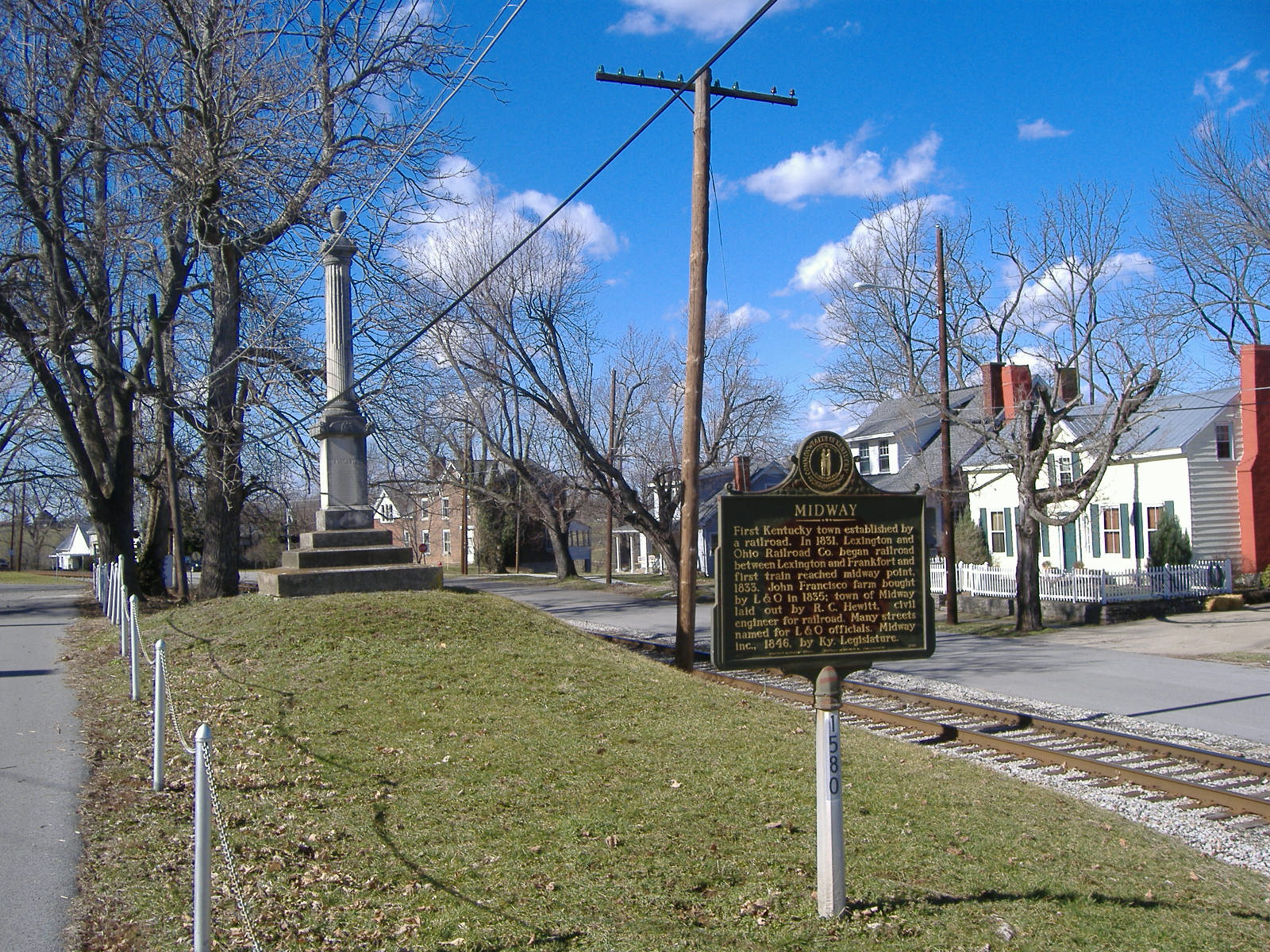
West side of historic district

The Midway Historic District of Midway, Kentucky, was designated by the National Register of Historic Places as a historic district on November 17, 1978. In 2003, faced with a declining downtown, a major streetscape renovation project began as part of the Kentucky Main Street Program.

Midway was the first town built by a railroad company in Kentucky, established by the Lexington and Ohio Railroad, whose goal was to connect Lexington, Kentucky to the Ohio River, bypassing Louisville. The L&O were building a line between Frankfort, Kentucky and Lexington, starting in 1831, with the first train arriving at the "midway" point in 1833, on a farm owned by John Francisco. On January 31, 1835, the L&O bought the farm from Francisco for $6,491.25, and had their civil engineer, R. C. Hewitt, plat out the town. It was named Midway due to being equally distant from Frankfort and Lexington. Many of the town's streets were named for individuals that worked for the L&O. The state of Kentucky incorporated the town in 1846.

Although upgraded with newer technology, the path of the original railroad line through the town is still in use by the railroad, bisecting the business district.

On July 15, 1862, John Hunt Morgan stopped here to misdirect Union forces back to Frankfort, instead of pursuing him.

A museum is temporarily in a former saloon that now hosts a store for local merchandise, especially historical book regarding Kentucky.

The Second Christian Church is believed to be the oldest black congregation in Kentucky.

== See also ==
- Martyrs Monument in Midway
