= Muley (horse) =

British Thoroughbred racehorse

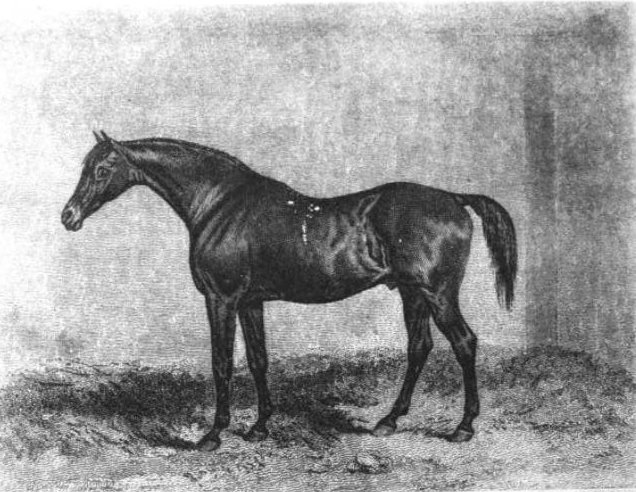
- Sire: Orville
- Grandsire: Beningbrough
- Dam: Eleanor
- Damsire: Whiskey
- Sex: Stallion
- Foaled: 1810
- Country: Great Britain
- Colour: Bay
- Record: 4, 2-1-1

Muley (1810 – 1837) was a British racehorse. His main contribution to the Thoroughbred was as an influential sire.

== Background ==
Muley's pedigree was strong. His dam (Eleanor) won both the Epsom Oaks and Epsom Derby. His sire (Orville) won 20 of 34 races. He was bred in Suffolk by Sir Charles Bunbury, 6th Baronet.

== Racing career ==
Muley had a late start to his racing career and raced only four times as a five-year-old, winning twice.

== Stud career ==
Muley was retired to stud at Blickling Hall in 1816.

Muley was considered to have larger bone, and greater muscular power than any thoroughbred stallion in England according to the publication Celebrated Racehorses of the Past Centuries Vol.1 Thomas Taunton.

Notable offspring:

- Morisco (1819) - sire of Taurus: Leading sire in Great Britain and Ireland: 1841
- Leviathan (1823) - Leading sire in North America: 1837, 1838, 1839, 1843, 1848
- Margrave (1829) - won the St Leger Stakes in 1832
- Marpessa (1830) - Dam of Pocahontas, one of the most influential Thoroughbreds of all time
- Muley Moloch (1830) - sire of Alice Hawthorn, one of the greatest racemares of all time
- Vespa (1830) - won the Epsom Oaks in 1833
- Little Wonder (1837) - won the Epsom Derby in 1840

== Sire line tree ==
- Muley
  - Robin Hood
    - Black Comet
  - Morisco
    - Morris Dancer
    - Taurus
      - Boeotian
      - Ole Bull
      - Flambeau
      - Assassin
      - Buffalo
      - John O'Gaunt
        - Bolingbroke
        - Hungerford
      - Oakley
      - Minotaur
      - Minotaurus
      - Turnus
      - Salem
    - Zany
    - Cadet
      - George
  - Outlaw
    - Tamworth
  - Leviathan
    - Othello
      - Iago
      - Jumping Mullet
      - Argo
      - Corbia
    - Hugh L French
    - The Poney
    - Wacousta
    - Pete Whetstone
    - Boyd McNairy
    - John R Grymes
    - Outrage
    - Stanley
    - Tom Marshall
    - John Ross
    - Envoy
    - Black Satin
    - Ebony
    - Stafford
    - Capt Elgee
    - Jack Hays
  - Rector
  - Marvel
  - Margrave
    - Mulberry Wine
    - Perry
    - Lutzow
    - Blue Dick
    - Landscape
    - Gosport
    - Prince Albert
    - Tom Payne
    - Doubloon
    - Brown Dick
      - Gen Twiggs
    - Henry Perritt
  - Muley Moloch
    - Galaor
      - The Heir Of Linne
        - Lord Of Linne
        - Phaéton
    - Middleham
    - Moloch
    - Pagan
    - Cattonite
    - Edmond
    - Teetotaller
    - Phenomenon
    - Punjaub
  - Dick
    - Arthur
  - Muleyson
  - Gil Blas
  - King Of Clubs
  - Gilbert Gurney
  - Dulcimer
  - The Little Known
    - Little Hastings
      - Lord Hastings
  - Drayton
    - Bourton
    - Emigrant
  - Gibraltar
  - Hautboy
  - Little Wonder
  - Snoozer

== Pedigree ==
Pedigree of Muley (GB), bay horse, 1810
Sire Orville (GB) 1799	Beningbrough; 1791	King Fergus	Eclipse*
Sire Orville (GB) 1799	Beningbrough; 1791	King Fergus	Creeping Polly
Sire Orville (GB) 1799	Beningbrough; 1791	Fenwick's Herod mare	Herod*^
Sire Orville (GB) 1799	Beningbrough; 1791	Fenwick's Herod mare	Pyrrha^
Sire Orville (GB) 1799	Evelina; 1791	Highflyer	Herod*^
Sire Orville (GB) 1799	Evelina; 1791	Highflyer	Rachel
Sire Orville (GB) 1799	Evelina; 1791	Termagant	Tantrum
Sire Orville (GB) 1799	Evelina; 1791	Termagant	Cantatrice
Dam Eleanor (GB) 1798	Whiskey; 1789	Saltram	Eclipse*
Dam Eleanor (GB) 1798	Whiskey; 1789	Saltram	Virago
Dam Eleanor (GB) 1798	Whiskey; 1789	Calash	Herod*^
Dam Eleanor (GB) 1798	Whiskey; 1789	Calash	Teresa^
Dam Eleanor (GB) 1798	Young Giantess; 1790	Diomed	Florizel^
Dam Eleanor (GB) 1798	Young Giantess; 1790	Diomed	Spectator mare
Dam Eleanor (GB) 1798	Young Giantess; 1790	Giantess	Matchem*^
Dam Eleanor (GB) 1798	Young Giantess; 1790	Giantess	Molly Longlegs

*^ Muley is inbred 4S x 4S x 4D x 5D to the stallion Herod, meaning that he appears fourth generation twice on the sire side of his pedigree and fourth generation once and fifth generation once (via Florizel)^ on the dam side of his pedigree.

* Muley is inbred 4S × 4D to the stallion Eclipse, meaning that he appears fourth generation on the sire side of his pedigree and fourth generation on the dam side of his pedigree.

*^ Muley is inbred 5S × 5D x 4D to the stallion Matchem, meaning that he appears fifth generation (via Pyrrha)^ on the sire side of his pedigree and fifth generation (via Teresa)^ and fourth generation on the dam side of his pedigree.
