= Hutchison, Kentucky =

Unincorporated community in Kentucky, United States

Coordinates: 38°08′17″N 84°20′24″W

Hutchison is an unincorporated community in Bourbon County, Kentucky, in the United States.

== History ==
Hutchison (formerly called Hutchison's) was a station on the Kentucky Central Railroad. A post office was established at Hutchison in 1856, and remained in operation until it was discontinued in 1930.
