= 1896 Kentucky Derby =

Horse race

22nd Kentucky Derby
- Kentucky Derby
- Grade I stakes race
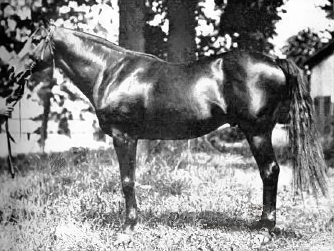
- Ben Brush, winner of the 1896 Kentucky Derby
- Location: Churchill Downs
- Date: May 6, 1896
- Distance: 1 1/4 miles (10 furlongs)
- Winning horse: Ben Brush
- Winning time: 2:07.75
- Jockey: Willie Simms
- Trainer: Hardy Campbell Jr.
- Owner: Mike F. Dwyer
- Surface: Dirt

The 1896 Kentucky Derby was the 22nd running of the Kentucky Derby. The race took place on May 6, 1896. This was the first Derby held at the current distance of 1 1/4 miles (2.0 km). Accordingly, the winning horse, Ben Brush, set the then-current Derby record at that distance with a time of 2:07.75.

== Full results ==
Finished	Post	Horse	Jockey	Trainer	Owner	Time / behind
1st	7	Ben Brush	Willie Simms	Hardy Campbell Jr.	Michael F. Dwyer	2:07.75
2nd	5	Ben Eder	J. Tabor		Hot Springs Stable	Nose
3rd	1	Semper Ego	A. Perkins		L. B. Ringgold	8
4th	3	First Mate	Charles A. Thorpe		Augustus Eastin & Samuel E. Larabie	8
5th	8	The Dragon	Monk Overton		James E. Pepper	
6th	6	Parson	Tommy Britton		Himyar Stable	
7th	2	The Winner	W. Walker		William Wallace	
8th	9	Ulysses	Robert "Tiny" Williams		Edward D. Brown	

- Winning breeder: Runnymede Farm (KY)

== Payout ==
- The winner received a purse of $4,850.
- Second place received $700.
- Third place received $300.
