= 1880 Kentucky Derby =

Horse race

6th Kentucky Derby
- Kentucky Derby
- Grade I stakes race
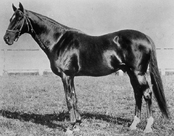
- 1880 Kentucky Derby winner Fonso
- Location: Churchill Downs
- Date: May 18, 1880
- Winning horse: Fonso
- Jockey: George Garret Lewis
- Trainer: Dutch Rolfes
- Owner: John Snell Shawhan
- Surface: Dirt

The 1880 Kentucky Derby was the 6th running of the annually-recurring race. The race took place on May 18, 1880. A dry spell stretching from late April to race day left the track with thick dust that obscured the horses from view for part of the race. That dust is credited with helping Fonso win the race. His early lead kept him in front of it as it partially obscured the vision of the horses behind him. Though he won, he was not really considered an exceptional horse. He had been bought for $200. Remarkably, his owner sold him for about $2500 after the summer races in Lexington.

This race was the first in which a jockey at the Derby officially registered a complaint with the stewards. Billy Lakeland claimed a foul against Fonso. However, his complaint was not supported.

Fonso's jockey was Garret Lewis, a Black rider who was part of the group Blacks who dominated the sport in the South and border states after the Civil War.

== Full results ==
Finished	Post	Horse	Jockey	Traine	Owner	Time / behind
1st		Fonso	Garret Lewis	John Henry "Dutch" Rolfes	John Snell Shawhan	
2nd		Kimball	William Lakeland		William Cottrill	
3rd		Bancroft	Isaac Murphy		Milton Young	
4th		Boulevard	Alonzo Allen		W. C. McGavock & Co.	
5th		Quito	Jim McLaughlin	Frank McCabe	Dwyer Bros.	

== Payout ==
Post	Horse	Win	Place	Show
	Fonso	$ 15.70		

- The winner received a purse of $3,800.
- Second place received $200.
