= Baden-Baden (horse) =

American-bred Thoroughbred racehorse

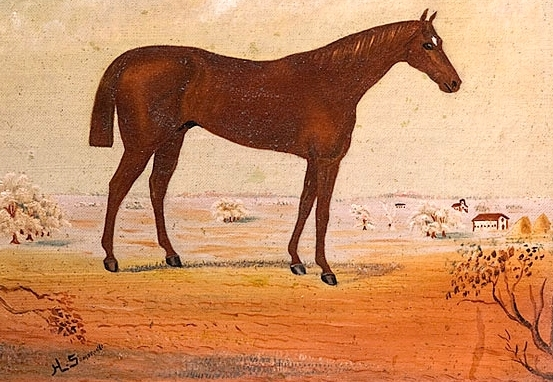
- Sire: Australian (GB)
- Grandsire: West Australian
- Dam: Lavender
- Damsire: Wagner
- Sex: Stallion
- Foaled: 1874
- Country: United States
- Colour: Chestnut
- Breeder: A. J. Alexander
- Owner: Daniel Swigert; William B. Astor, Jr.
- Trainer: Edward D. Brown; James Williams
- Record: 10: 4-3-1
- Earnings: $12,425

Major wins
- Young America Stakes (1876); Jersey Derby (1877); Travers Stakes (1877); American Classic Race wins: Kentucky Derby (1877)
- Last updated on March 29, 2020

Baden-Baden (1874 – July 1, 1889) was an American Thoroughbred racehorse best known for winning the 1877 Kentucky Derby. He was bred by A. J. Alexander at his Woodburn Stud in Woodford County, Kentucky. Baden-Baden was sired by Australian (GB) (who in turn was sired by West Australian, first horse to win the English Triple Crown in 1853); his dam, Lavender, was sired by Wagner. He was purchased at Woodburn's yearling sale by Kentucky horseman Daniel Swigert, from Elmendorf Farm.

== Racing career ==
After the sale, Baden-Baden was trained by future U.S. Racing Hall of Fame inductee Edward D. Brown. In his first start, jockey William Walker rode him to victory in the fledgling Kentucky Derby. Baden-Baden was then sold to New York City businessman William Backhouse Astor, Jr.

=== 1877 Kentucky Derby ===
The weather was fair and the track, although dry, was "cuppy" from recent rains. The start was delayed by fractious horses; before the advent of the starting gate, Thoroughbreds raced from a standing start. Vera Cruz (ridden by Isaac Murphy) reared and stumbled, nearly unseating his rider and losing a great deal of ground. Robert Swim, on Leonard, took the lead. On the backstretch Baden-Baden (who had been in fourth place) began his run, reaching Leonard at the three-quarter-mile pole. He passed Leonard just as they turned into the stretch and they pounded down it together, Baden-Baden maintaining his lead.

Murphy was known for coming from behind, and that was what he tried here. He had begun his drive well before the stretch, and passed tiring horses until he was closing in on Baden-Baden and Leonard. Vera Cruz finally tired and finished fourth, with Baden-Baden first and Leonard second. The time for the 1½ miles (the Derby was run at that distance from its inauguration in 1875 until 1895) was a slow 2:38.

=== After the Derby ===
Racing for Astor at New York-area tracks, Baden-Baden finished third in the Belmont Stakes; he later won the prestigious Travers Stakes at Saratoga Race Course. He made his last start at the end of his three-year-old season in the Kenner Stakes, in which he broke a sesamoid bone. This injury ended Baden-Baden's racing career; he was retired to stud duty at William Astor's Ferncliffe Stud, where he sired many offspring (mostly daughters, with few successful) into the late 1880s.

== Pedigree ==
Pedigree of Baden-Baden (USA), chestnut stallion, 1874
Sire Australian (GB) 1858	West Australian; B. 1850	Melbourne	Humphrey Clinker
Sire Australian (GB) 1858	West Australian; B. 1850	Melbourne	Cervantes Mare
Sire Australian (GB) 1858	West Australian; B. 1850	Mowerina	Touchstone
Sire Australian (GB) 1858	West Australian; B. 1850	Mowerina	Emma
Sire Australian (GB) 1858	Emilia; 1840	Young Emilius	Emilius*
Sire Australian (GB) 1858	Emilia; 1840	Young Emilius	Shoveller
Sire Australian (GB) 1858	Emilia; 1840	Persian	Whisker
Sire Australian (GB) 1858	Emilia; 1840	Persian	Variety
Dam Lavender 1855	Wagner; 1834	Sir Charles	Sir Archy
Dam Lavender 1855	Wagner; 1834	Sir Charles	Citizen Mare
Dam Lavender 1855	Wagner; 1834	Maria West	Marion
Dam Lavender 1855	Wagner; 1834	Maria West	Ella Crump
Dam Lavender 1855	Alice Carneal; 1836	Sarpedon	Emilius*
Dam Lavender 1855	Alice Carneal; 1836	Sarpedon	Icaria
Dam Lavender 1855	Alice Carneal; 1836	Rowena	Sumpter
Dam Lavender 1855	Alice Carneal; 1836	Rowena	Lady Grey (Family: 12)

* Baden-Baden is inbred 4S × 4D to the stallion Emilius, meaning that he appears fourth generation on the sire side of his pedigree and fourth generation on the dam side of his pedigree.
