= Midway, Kentucky =

- City
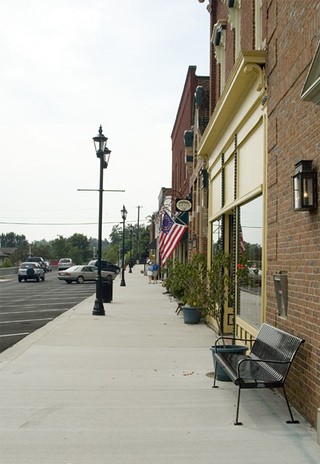
- East Main Street in Midway

- Flag

- Location of Midway in Woodford County, Kentucky.
- Coordinates: 38°8′59″N 84°41′5″W
- Country: United States
- State: Kentucky
- County: Woodford
- Established: January 31, 1835
- Incorporated: February 7, 1846
- Named for: its location relative to Frankfort and Lexington

Government
  - Mayor: Grayson Vandegrift

Area
  - Total: 1.37 sq mi (3.55 km^{2})
  - Land: 1.37 sq mi (3.54 km^{2})
  - Water: 0 sq mi (0.00 km^{2})
- Elevation: 833 ft (254 m)

Population (2020)
  - Total: 1,718
  - Estimate (2022): 1,744
  - Density: 1,255.6/sq mi (484.79/km^{2})
- Time zone: UTC-5 (Eastern (EST))
  - Summer (DST): UTC-4 (EDT)
- ZIP code: 40347
- Area code: 859
- FIPS code: 21-52140
- Website: www.meetmeinmidway.com

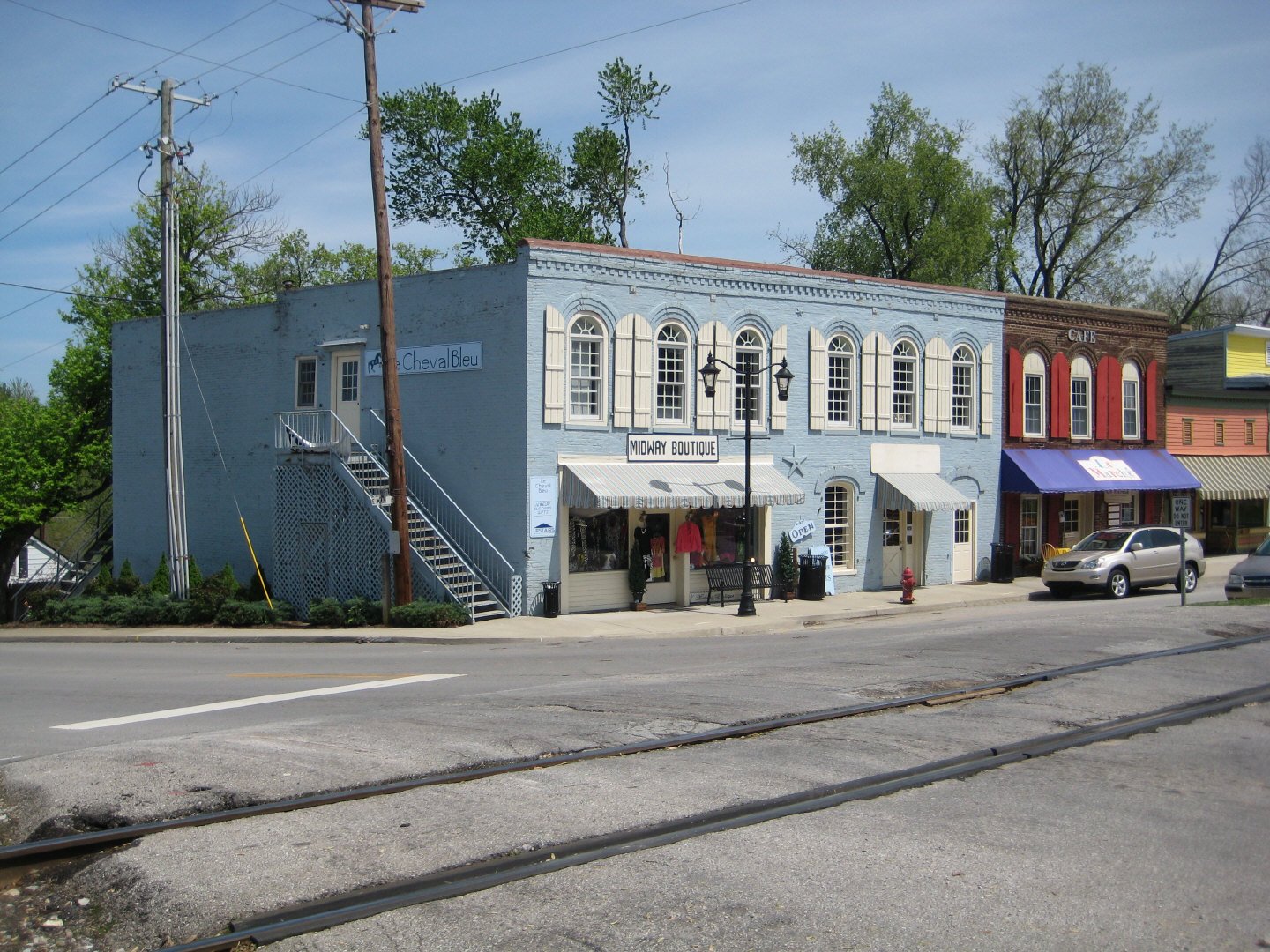
View looking west from intersection of Highway 62 and Main Street

Midway is a home rule-class city in Woodford County, Kentucky, in the United States. Its population was 1,741 at the time of the year 2020 U.S. census. It is part of the Lexington-Fayette Metropolitan Statistical Area.

The town sits just off Interstate 64 and among several major thoroughbred breeding operations, such as Three Chimneys Farm and former Gov. Brereton C. Jones' Airdrie Stud. In 2003, faced with a declining downtown, the city began a major streetscape renovation project as part of the Kentucky Main Street program. New period structures and lighting brought new life to the town. It is known for its distinctive shops and restaurants. An active business association holds events every month of the year, and the city is a starting point or waypoint for several road races that wind through the surrounding countryside.

== History ==
Before its European exploration, the area around Midway was inhabited by the Mound Builders. Two large and several smaller American Indian mounds have been identified on nearby farms.

The present city began as a small settlement known as Stevenson's at the time of its first post office in 1832. On January 31, 1835, the local farmer John Francisco sold his 216.375-acre (87.564 ha) farm to the Lexington and Ohio Railroad for $6,491.25. The railroad then used the land to establish Kentucky's first railroad town, naming it Middleway for its location relative to Lexington and Frankfort, Kentucky. (The town is also equidistant between Versailles and Georgetown.) The major streets of Midway were named in honor of the railroad's original officials. It was renamed Midway in 1837.

Midway Historic District comprises much of downtown Midway, and is listed on the National Register of Historic Places.

=== Distilling Bourbon in Midway ===
Midway has a very rich history of distilling Bourbon for nearly a 100-year period from 1865 to 1959. The Distillery was located at the corner of Gratz Street and Dudley Street, nestled in the bend of the Lee's Branch of the North Elkhorn Creek. There were several owners over the years, with the Distillery operating under various business names. Buford, Guthrie & Co. 1865–67, A. Buford Distillery 1867–68, Keller Distillery 1868–77, 1878–89, S.J. Greenbaum Distillery 1890–1911, Belle of Anderson Distillery 1912–14, Midway Distilling Co. 1915–24, Destroyed by fire in 1924 and closed from then till 1933, rebuilt and operated as the Woodford County Distilling Company 1933–40, Park & Tilford Distillery 1941–53, Schenley Products Distillery 1954–59. Early in the 1960s, Schenley Products donated the property, building and equipment to the Midway Woman's College. Notable national brand names produced include, Belle of Bourbon, Belle of Lexington, Belle of Anderson, Glenarme, Arlington, Jessamine, and Woodford. Two buildings still remain, currently known as Kentucky Cannabis Company, previously a distilling building and The Midway Loft Apartments, previously an aging warehouse. A large Distillery warehouse fire occurred on August 4, 1908, where over 47,000 barrels of bourbon where destroyed. The Lee's Branch was on fire for over one mile, and several Midway residents were scorched dipping tin cups into the Lee's Branch for Bourbon and Water. Martin Street next to the Lee's Branch was nicknamed "Tin Cup Alley". The Midway Fire Department was recognized for saving the City and the Female Orphan's School.

In 1920, during a robbery of the distillery, Benjamin Rodgers and Homer Nave were killed. Richard W. James, was arrested for the killings. He admitted to the robbery but denied shooting the men, and claimed that the facility's superintendent of bottling, Samuel Seay, had a deal with James and others to share the proceeds of the stolen liquor. James was convicted of murder, but one member of the jury refused to vote for his execution on religious grounds. On March 13, 1921, a mob took James from the county jail in Versailles, Kentucky and lynched him from a tree near Margaret College, about a half-mile from Versailles. No one from the mob was indicted and, when Gov. Edwin P. Morrow removed the sheriff from his post, local voters elected his wife to replace him.

== Geography ==
Midway is located in the northern section of Woodford County in the Bluegrass region of Kentucky, an area with farms that produce tobacco, corn, soybeans, cattle, and horses.

According to the United States Census Bureau, the city has a total area of 1.1 square miles (2.8 km^{2}), all land.

== Demographics ==
Historical population
Census	Pop.	Note	%±
1860	402		—
1870	532		32.3%
1880	950		78.6%
1890	1,185		24.7%
1900	1,045		−11.8%
1910	937		−10.3%
1920	915		−2.3%
1930	808		−11.7%
1940	886		9.7%
1950	950		7.2%
1960	1,044		9.9%
1970	1,278		22.4%
1980	1,445		13.1%
1990	1,290		−10.7%
2000	1,620		25.6%
2010	1,641		1.3%
2020	1,718		4.7%
2022 (est.)	1,744		1.5%
U.S. Decennial Census

=== 2020 census ===
As of the 2020 census, Midway had a population of 1,718. The median age was 40.3 years. 13.4% of residents were under the age of 18 and 20.3% of residents were 65 years of age or older. For every 100 females there were 85.5 males, and for every 100 females age 18 and over there were 80.7 males age 18 and over.

0.0% of residents lived in urban areas, while 100.0% lived in rural areas.

There were 640 households in Midway, of which 24.4% had children under the age of 18 living in them. Of all households, 44.8% were married-couple households, 17.0% were households with a male householder and no spouse or partner present, and 33.4% were households with a female householder and no spouse or partner present. About 34.9% of all households were made up of individuals and 15.6% had someone living alone who was 65 years of age or older.

There were 712 housing units, of which 10.1% were vacant. The homeowner vacancy rate was 1.9% and the rental vacancy rate was 5.3%.

Racial composition as of the 2020 census
Race	Number	Percent
White	1,514	88.1%
Black or African American	105	6.1%
American Indian and Alaska Native	7	0.4%
Asian	7	0.4%
Native Hawaiian and Other Pacific Islander	1	0.1%
Some other race	24	1.4%
Two or more races	60	3.5%
Hispanic or Latino (of any race)	62	3.6%

=== 2000 census ===
As of the census of 2000, there were 1,620 people, 623 households, and 409 families residing in the city. The population density was 1,484.3 people per square mile (573.1 people/km^{2}). There were 672 housing units at an average density of 615.7 units per square mile (237.7 units/km^{2}). The racial makeup of the city was 89.81% White, 7.72% African American, 0.31% Asian, 0.06% Pacific Islander, 1.17% from other races, and 0.93% from two or more races. Hispanic or Latino of any race were 1.42% of the population.

There were 623 households, out of which 28.6% had children under the age of 18 living with them, 54.1% were married couples living together, 8.8% had a female householder with no husband present, and 34.2% were non-families. 28.9% of all households were made up of individuals, and 11.7% had someone living alone who was 65 years of age or older. The average household size was 2.38 and the average family size was 2.96.

21.0% of the population was under the age of 18, 14.1% from 18 to 24, 29.9% from 25 to 44, 21.6% from 45 to 64, and 13.3% who were 65 years of age or older. The median age was 35 years. For every 100 females, there were 75.3 males. For every 100 females age 18 and over, there were 73.0 males.

The median income for a household in the city was $50,909, and the median income for a family was $60,326. Males had a median income of $35,795 versus $32,500 for females. The per capita income for the city was $24,528. About 2.0% of families and 3.6% of the population were below the poverty line, including 0.6% of those under age 18 and 14.2% of those age 65 or over.

== Arts and culture ==
- Francisco's Farm Arts Festival The focus of the mid-May event is the outdoor exhibition of juried fine art and fine craft, giving the opportunity to meet and purchase art from the creators themselves. It is located at the campus of Midway University, 512 E. Stephens St., Midway.
- Midway Fall Festival has been named one of Kentucky's top 20 festivals. The festival features crafts, food and other items from more than 200 vendors; demonstrators; entertainment, and children's activities.
- Midway Independence Day Celebration is called "Sparks in the Park", at Walter Bradley Park, the city park on Dudley Street.

== Education ==
=== Current schools ===
- Northside Elementary serves Kindergarten o 5th grade (founded 1992)
- Midway University, a private institution that went coed in 2016 (founded 1847 as the Kentucky Female Orphan School)

=== Defunct schools ===
- Midway Elementary (closed 1992, succeeded by Northside Elementary)
- Midway High School (closed 1964, succeeded by Woodford County High School)

=== Public library ===
Midway has a lending library, a branch of the Woodford County Public Library.

== Climate ==
The climate in this area is characterized by hot, humid summers and generally mild to cool winters. According to the Köppen Climate Classification system, Midway has a humid subtropical climate, abbreviated "Cfa" on climate maps.

== Notable people ==
- Noah Mullins, American football player.
- Abraham Perry, trainer of Kentucky Derby winner
- Sam Shepard, playwright, actor, author, screenwriter, and director
- Davey Whitney, College basketball coach
- Steve Zahn, actor
