= Margrave (British horse) =

British-bred Thoroughbred racehorse

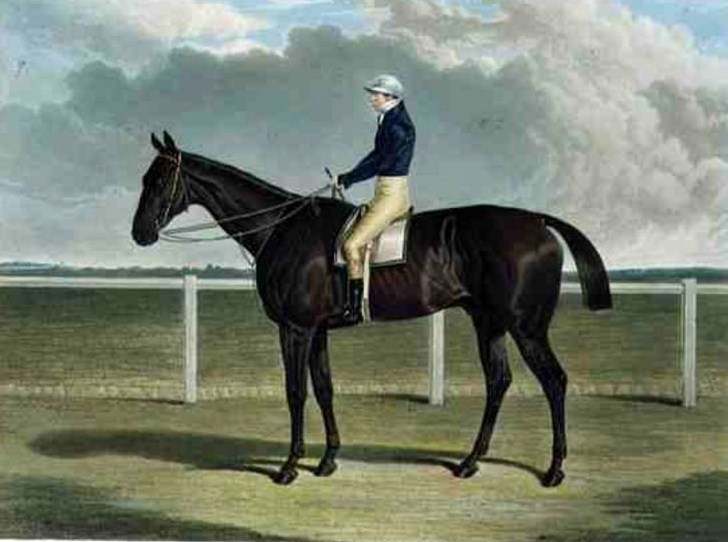
- 'Margrave', the Winner of the Great St. Leger Stakes at Doncaster, 1832 by John Frederick Herring, Sr.
- Sire: Muley
- Grandsire: Orville
- Dam: Election mare
- Damsire: Election
- Sex: Stallion
- Foaled: 1829
- Country: United Kingdom
- Colour: Chestnut
- Breeder: Alexander Nowell
- Owner: Mr Wreford; Mr Dilly; John Gully
- Trainer: John Scott
- Record: 10: 6-2-0

Major wins
- Criterion Stakes (1831); St Leger Stakes (1832); Gascoigne Stakes (1832); Grand Duke Michael Stakes (1832)

Margrave (1829–1852) was a British Thoroughbred racehorse and sire best known for winning the St Leger Stakes in 1832. In a racing career which lasted from June 1831 until April 1833 he ran ten times and won six races. He was one of the leading British two-year-olds of 1831, when his three wins included the Criterion Stakes at Newmarket and he was one of the favourites for the following year's British Classic Races. He finished fourth in The Derby, allegedly being held back to allow another of his owner's horses to win. In autumn he won the St Leger and the Grand Duke Michael Stakes but ran poorly on his only race as a four-year-old the following spring. He was then retired to stud where he had some success as a sire of winners in both the United Kingdom and the United States.

== Background ==
Margrave was bred by Alexander Nowell at Underley Hall near Kirkby Lonsdale in Westmoreland where his sire Muley was based. Muley was a son of the Derby-winning mare Eleanor and won two races as a five-year-old at Newmarket in 1815. His early stud career was disappointing and he had been covering half-bred mares for some time before being bought by Nowell and relocated to Underley where he had considerable success. In addition to Margrave, he sired the Classic winners Little Wonder (Epsom Derby) and Vespa (Epsom Oaks).

Margrave was a very dark-coated chestnut with no white markings. He was a large, powerful colt, standing 16 hands high, but not an attractive individual, being described as "a great, ugly horse... with lopping ears". As a three-year-old, he was trained by John Scott, who sent out the winners of 41 classics, from his Whitewall Stables at Malton in North Yorkshire.

== Racing career ==
=== 1831: two-year-old season ===
Margrave racing career began at Stockbridge in Hampshire on 8 June 1831 when he raced in the colours of Mr Wreford. In a six furlong sweepstake he started 2/1 second favourite in a field of four and won by a length after "a good race" from Mr Sadler's filly Eleanor. After this race Margrave was sold and entered into the ownership of Mr Dilly. The colt did not run again until 24 August when he appeared for a half-mile sweepstakes at Winchester. He did not have to race for the prize, as his three opponents were withdrawn, allowing him to walk over. By late September, Margrave was being regarded as a potential winner of the following year's Derby, being offered at odds of 13/1.

In October, Margrave was sent to Newmarket Racecourse where he contested the five furlong Clearwell Stakes, one of the season's most important races for two-year-olds. He started at odds of 7/1 against twelve opponents. He started very poorly but made ground in the closing stages and finished second by half a length to the favourite Emiliana, a filly owned and trained by William Chifney. At the Newmarket Houghton meeting two weeks later, Margrave was one of nine runners for the equally important Criterion Stakes. Ridden by George Edwards, he started the 2/1 favourite and won from Colonel Peel's colt Archibald, who went on to win the 2000 Guineas.

=== 1832: three-year-old season ===
Before his first run in 1832, Margrave was bought for 2,500 guineas by John Gully a former champion prize-fighter who had built a second career as a professional gambler and bookmaker. Gully, in association with Robert Ridsdale, also owned a colt named St Giles, who had shown little ability as a two-year-old, but showed improved form in early 1832. From the time he was purchased by Gully, Margrave's odds for the Derby lengthened, while St Giles was heavily supported, leading to speculation that the result of the race being arranged to bring off a betting coup.

On 7 June, having survived an objection from a Mr Wheeler who claimed that he was actually a four-year-old, Margrave started at odds of 7/1 for the Derby at Epsom Downs Racecourse in a field of 22 runners. The race was won by St Giles, the 3/1 favourite, with Margrave, who was not given a hard race by his jockey, finishing in fourth place. The Sporting Magazine's correspondent was convinced that Margrave ("by far the best horse in the race") had been deliberately held back to facilitate the success of his stable companion.

Margrave did not run again until 18 September when he was sent to Doncaster Racecourse for the St Leger Stakes. Ridden by Jem Robinson, he was made the 8/1 fourth choice in the betting in a field of seventeen colts and fillies, his odds having lengthened in the week before the race after reports that he had injured a leg and was unlikely to take part. Robinson restrained the colt and he was not among the early leaders but began to make steady progress when the pace quickened in the straight. In the final furlong Margrave produced a strong late challenge on the outside to overtake the leader Birdcatcher (not to be confused with the similarly named Irish horse) and won by three quarters of a length. The Sporting Magazine criticised the very slow early pace and described Margrave as a "coarse, heavy looking horse", but admitted that he won the race very easily. Two days later, over the same course and distance, Margrave started at odds of 1/5 for the Gascoigne Stakes and won from his only opponent, a colt named Julius.

Margrave ended his season with two runs at Newmarket's First October meeting, having walked the one hundred and thirty miles from Doncaster in less than two weeks. On the opening day of the meeting he won the Grand Duke Michael Stakes over ten furlongs, beating Lord Exeter's previously undefeated Oaks winner Galata. Two days later, Margrave started odd-on favourite for the Newmarket St Leger over the two-mile "Ditch-In". After a slow early pace, the race ended with a strongly contested sprint finish in which Margrave was beaten a head by the locally trained Archibald who had been rested for several weeks with the race as his objective. There was some criticism of Jem Robinson's tactics on the runner-up, as it was felt that he should have made use of Margrave's stamina by setting a stronger pace. At the Houghton meeting four weeks later, Margrave was withdrawn from a scheduled match race against the four-year-old filly Camarine, with Gully paying a £150 forfeit.

=== 1833: four-year-old season ===
Margrave reappeared as a four-year-old at the Newmarket Craven meeting in April. In the two mile Claret Stakes he had little support in the betting and finished last of the four runners behind the Duke of Cleveland's colt Trustee. Later in the month he had been scheduled to run a match race over Newmarket's Abington Mile against Lord Conyngham's horse Bassetlaw. As Bassetlaw had died some time before, Gully was able to claim a prize of £200 without having to run his colt.

== Stud career ==
After standing at Bishop Burton, near Beverley in Yorkshire for two seasons Margrave was sold to Merritt & Company and exported to Virginia in 1835. He later stood in Tennessee before being sold to Major Gee and moved to Alabama where he died in 1852.

During his brief British stud career Margrave sired several good winners, as well as an unnamed mare who produced the 2000 Guineas and St Leger winner Sir Tatton Sykes. In the United States he was never a popular stallion, but sired several successful runners including Blue Dick, Brown Dick and Doubloon, as well as several influential broodmares including the female-line ancestors of Tom Ochiltree, Aristides, Apollo, Stone Street, Peter McCue and Mata Hari.

== Sire line tree ==
- Margrave
  - Mulberry Wine
  - Perry
  - Lutzow
  - Blue Dick
  - Landscape
  - Gosport
  - Prince Albert
  - Tom Payne
  - Doubloon
  - Brown Dick
    - Gen Twiggs
  - Henry Perritt

== Pedigree ==
Pedigree of Margrave (GB), chestnut stallion, 1829
Sire Muley (GB) 1810	Orville; 1799	Beningbrough	King Fergus*
Sire Muley (GB) 1810	Orville; 1799	Beningbrough	Fenwick's Herod mare
Sire Muley (GB) 1810	Orville; 1799	Evelina	Highflyer*^
Sire Muley (GB) 1810	Orville; 1799	Evelina	Termagant
Sire Muley (GB) 1810	Eleanor; 1798	Whiskey	Saltram
Sire Muley (GB) 1810	Eleanor; 1798	Whiskey	Calash
Sire Muley (GB) 1810	Eleanor; 1798	Young Giantess	Diomed
Sire Muley (GB) 1810	Eleanor; 1798	Young Giantess	Giantess
Dam Election mare (GB) 1815	Election; 1804	Gohanna	Mercury
Dam Election mare (GB) 1815	Election; 1804	Gohanna	Dundas Herod mare
Dam Election mare (GB) 1815	Election; 1804	Chestnut Skim	Woodpecker
Dam Election mare (GB) 1815	Election; 1804	Chestnut Skim	Milsintown's Herod mare
Dam Election mare (GB) 1815	Fair Helen; 1808	Hambletonian	King Fergus*
Dam Election mare (GB) 1815	Fair Helen; 1808	Hambletonian	Grey Highflyer^
Dam Election mare (GB) 1815	Fair Helen; 1808	Helen	Delpini
Dam Election mare (GB) 1815	Fair Helen; 1808	Helen	Rosalind (Family:2-l)

* Margrave is inbred 4S x 4D to the stallion King Fergus, meaning that he appears fourth generation on the sire side of his pedigree and fourth generation on the dam side of his pedigree.

*^ Margrave is inbred 4S x 5D to the stallion Highflyer, meaning that he appears fourth generation on the sire side of his pedigree and fifth generation (via Grey Highflyer)^ on the dam side of his pedigree.
