= Underley Hall =

Country house in Cumbria, England

Coordinates: 54.2157°N 2.5919°W

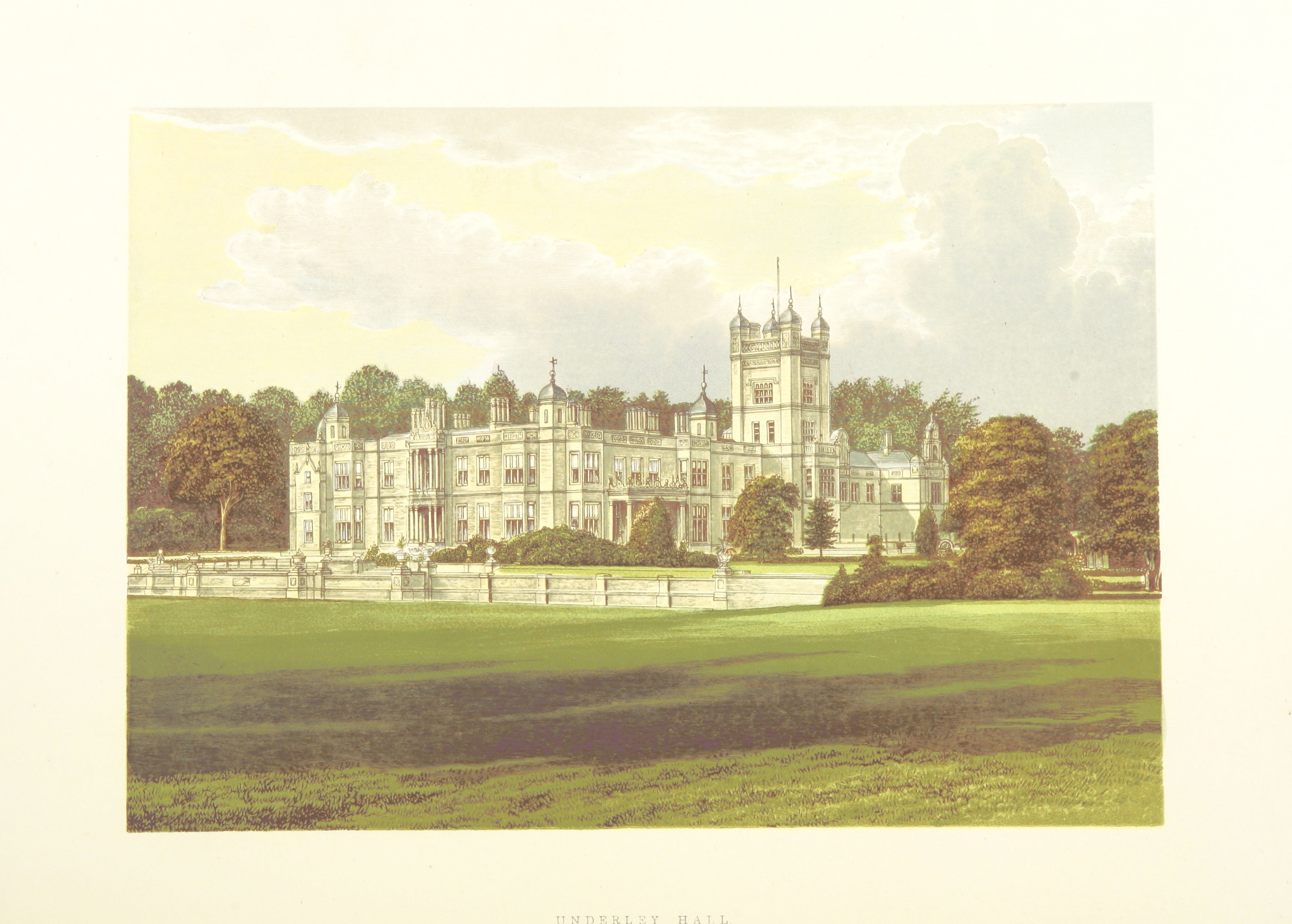
Underley Hall in 1879, from A Series of Picturesque Views of Seats of the Noblemen and Gentlemen of Great Britain and Ireland, by Francis Orpen Morris.

Underley Hall is a large country house near Kirkby Lonsdale in Cumbria. It was designed in a Jacobean Revival style by the architect George Webster for Alexander Nowell and built between 1825 and 1828, on the site of an earlier house. An additional wing and tower, designed by E. G. Paley and Hubert Austin, were added in 1874.

After being used as a school between 1940 and 1959, the property became St Michael's College, a junior seminary for the Roman Catholic Diocese of Lancaster, for which a modernist chapel was designed by George Grenfell-Baines of architecture practice BDP and constructed between 1964 and 1966.

In 1976 the building changed hands again, becoming an independent residential special school for teenagers with behavioural difficulties. The school closed in July 2014

== Early residents ==
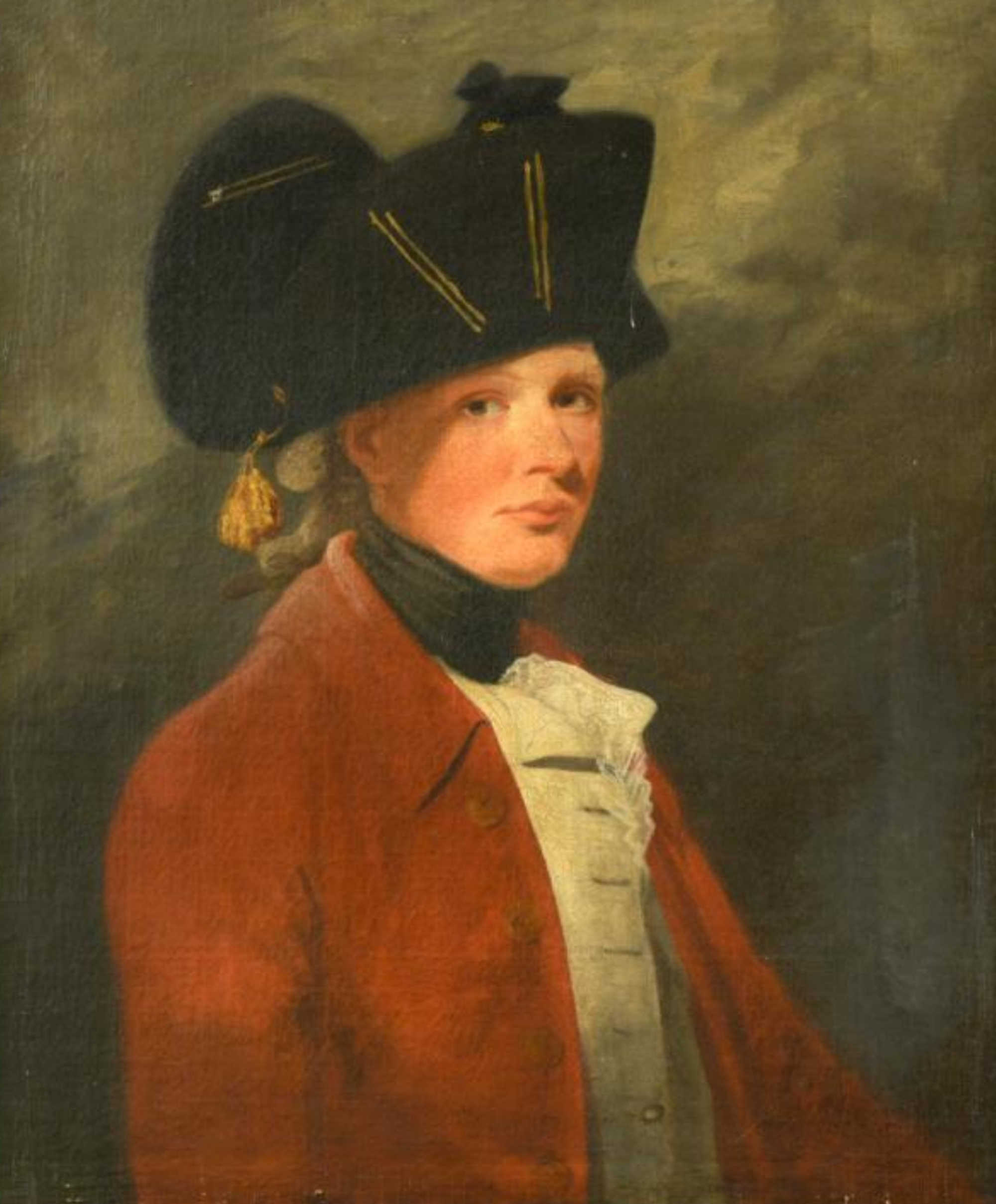
Alexander Nowell in about 1800

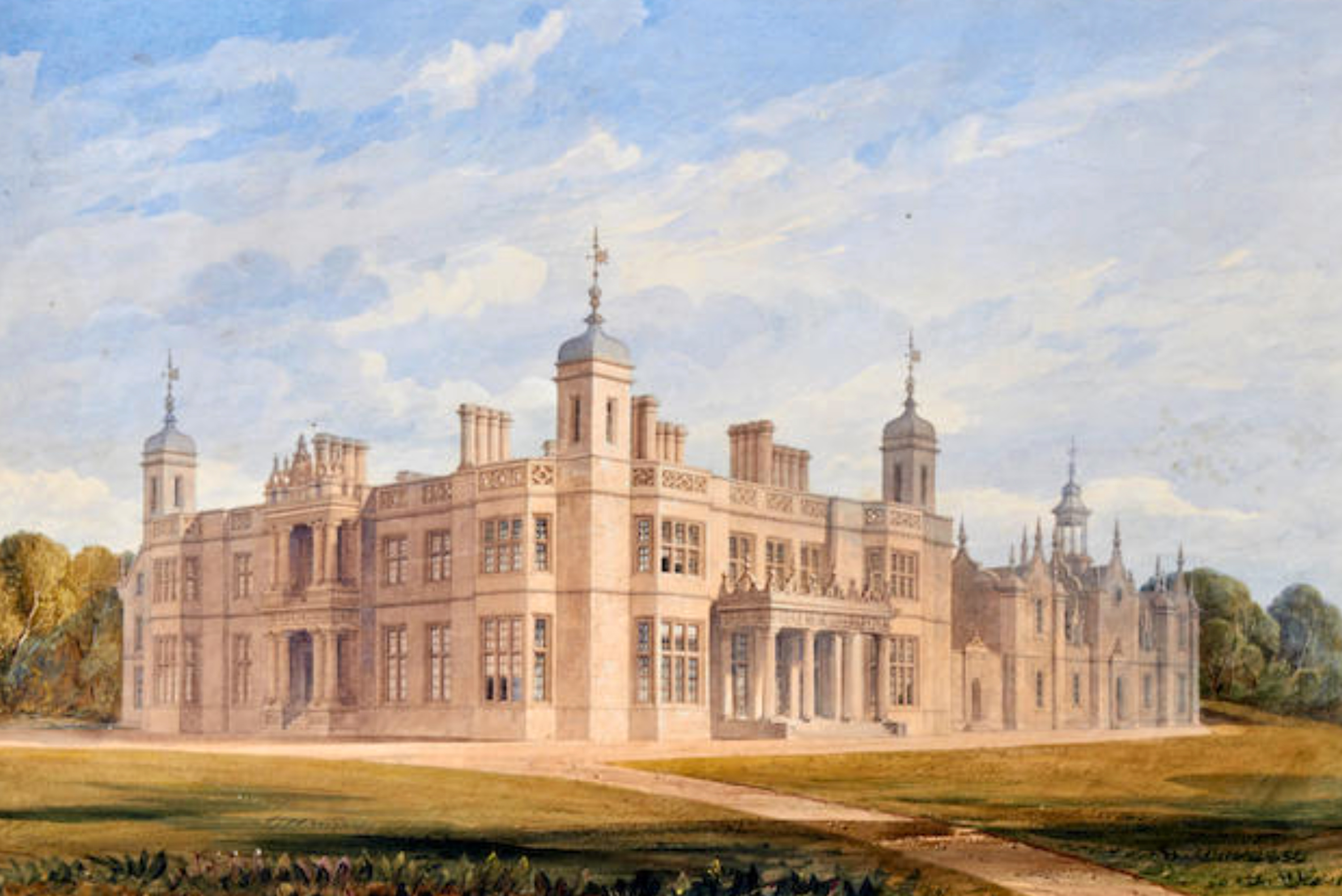
Painting of Underley Hall by John Chessell Buckler in 1828

Alexander Nowell (1761-1842) who built Underley Hall came from a wealthy landowning family. His father was Ralph Nowell (1721-1781) who owned Gawthorpe Hall and Eccleston in Lancashire. At the age of 20 he entered the East India Company’s Army and served in India for ten years. In 1792 he resigned and became an indigo manufacturer in a firm called Nowell & Kearnan. The following year he married the sister of his partner Maria Theresa Kearnan who was the widow of Henry Watson, the owner of a valuable dockyard property in Calcutta.

He became quite wealthy and the couple returned to England in 1805 and bought two properties. One in Wipole Street London and then three years later in 1808 the Underley Estate. His wife was the beneficiary from the Wills of two of her brothers and became wealthy in her own right. The couple had no children and when she died in 1824 she left all of her money to Alexander. In the following year he married Charlotte Farrington who was the daughter of James Farrington of Shawe Hall. Farrington was a wealthy landowner and gave the couple a very large marriage settlement. With this money and his inheritance he built Underley Hall. He commissioned the famous architect George Webster to undertake the task which took three years. When the building was finished in 1828 he asked John Chessell Buckler to paint five different perspectives of the house. The main one is shown and the other four can be seen at this reference.

William Thompson (1792-1854) was the son of James Thompson of Grayrigg. He joined his uncle in a firm of London iron merchants and became very wealthy. He also occupied many prestigious positions including the Mayor of London, Chairman of Lloyd's of London and Director of the Bank of England.

In 1817 he married Amelia Homfray (1799-1861), daughter of Samuel Homfray of Penydarren Place, Merthyr in Wales and Coworth Park, Berkshire. The couple had one daughter Amelia Thompson (1824-1864). She married in 1842 Thomas Taylour Earl of Bective (1822-1894).

When he died in 1854 William Thompson left a very detailed Will which is outlined at this reference. His wife was to have a life interest in the house and after that it was to go to his daughter. On her death his grandson was to inherit the property. His wife died in 1861 and his daughter died three years later in 1864. His grandson Sir Thomas Taylour became the owner at the age of 21 in 1865.

== Later residents ==
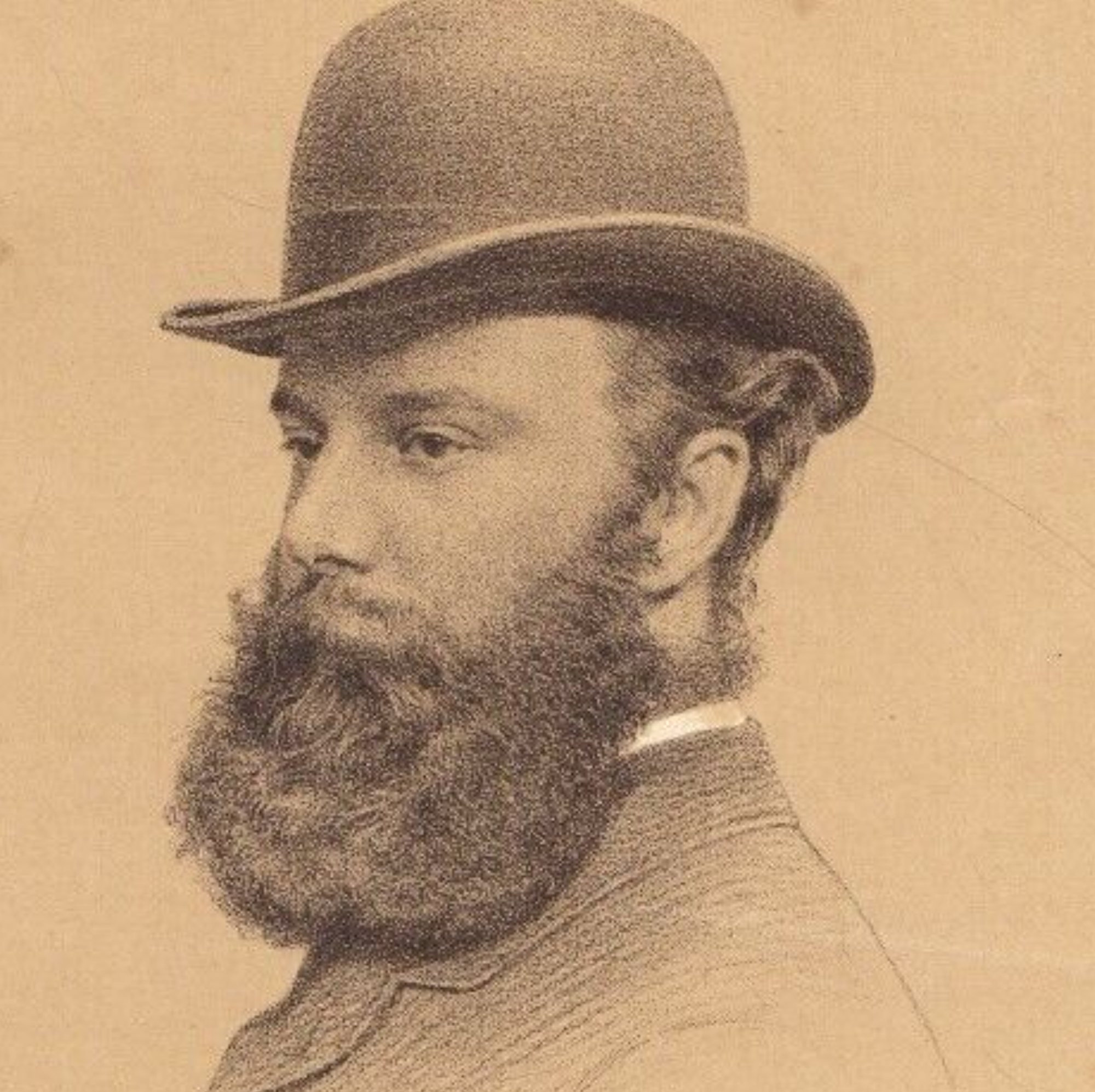
Sir Thomas Taylour Earl of Bective (1844-1893)

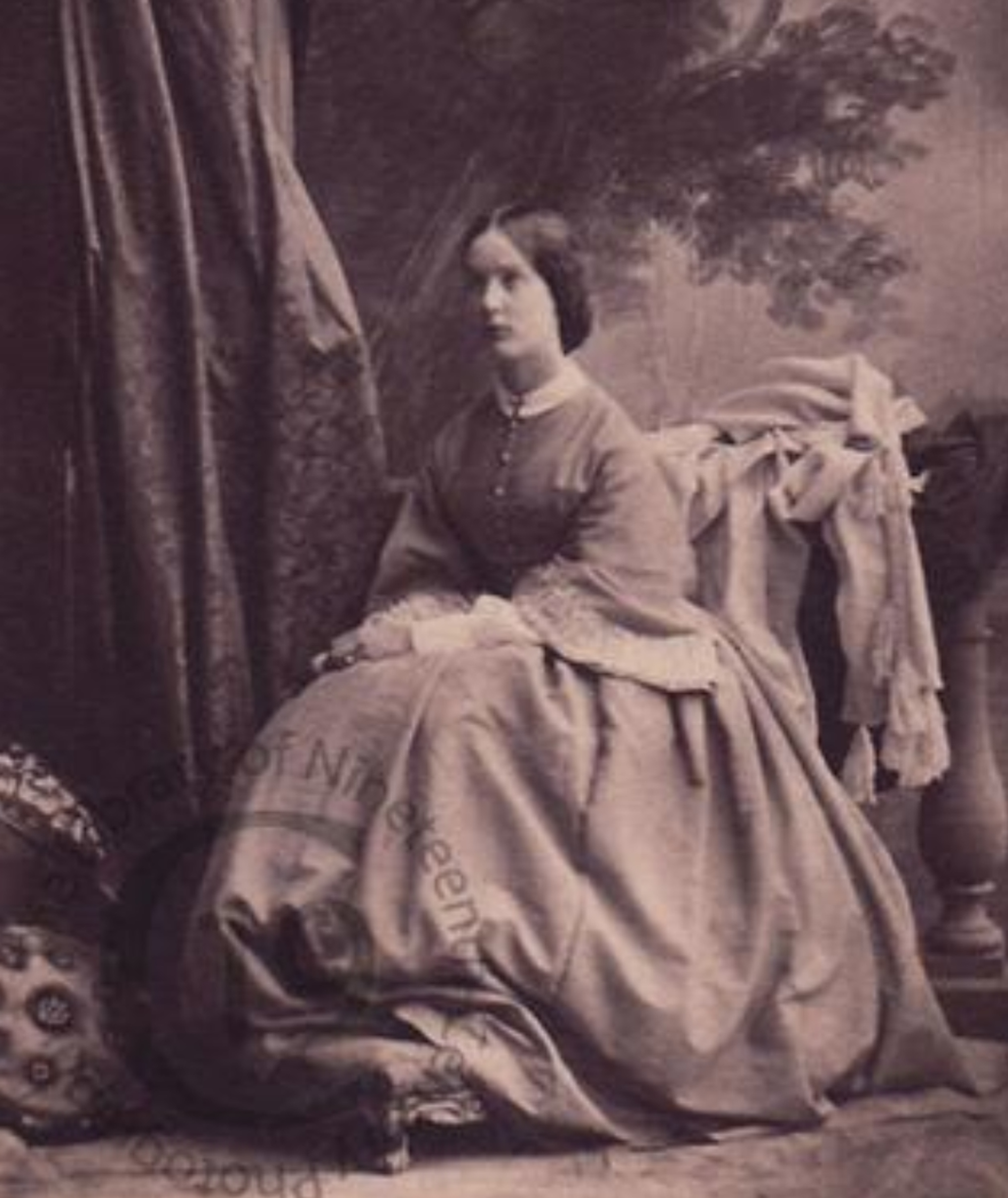
Lady Alice Taylour, Countess of Bective (1842-1928)

Sir Thomas Taylour (1844-1893) the Earl of Bective was the owner for the next thirty years. In 1867 he married Lady Alice Maria Hill (1842-1928) who was the daughter of Sir Arthur Hill, Marquess of Downshire. The couple made substantial additions and improvements to the property. In 1875 the magazine called “The Gardener’s Chronicle” gave a detailed description of the new additions to the house including the tower and the changes to the estate that were being made. The article can be read at this reference.

When Thomas died in 1893 his only child Lady Olivia Caroline Amelia Taylour (1869-1939) became the owner of Underley Hall. The year before she had married Lord Henry Cavendish-Bentinck and soon after her father’s death the couple moved into the house and her mother moved to Barnacre Lodge near Garstang.

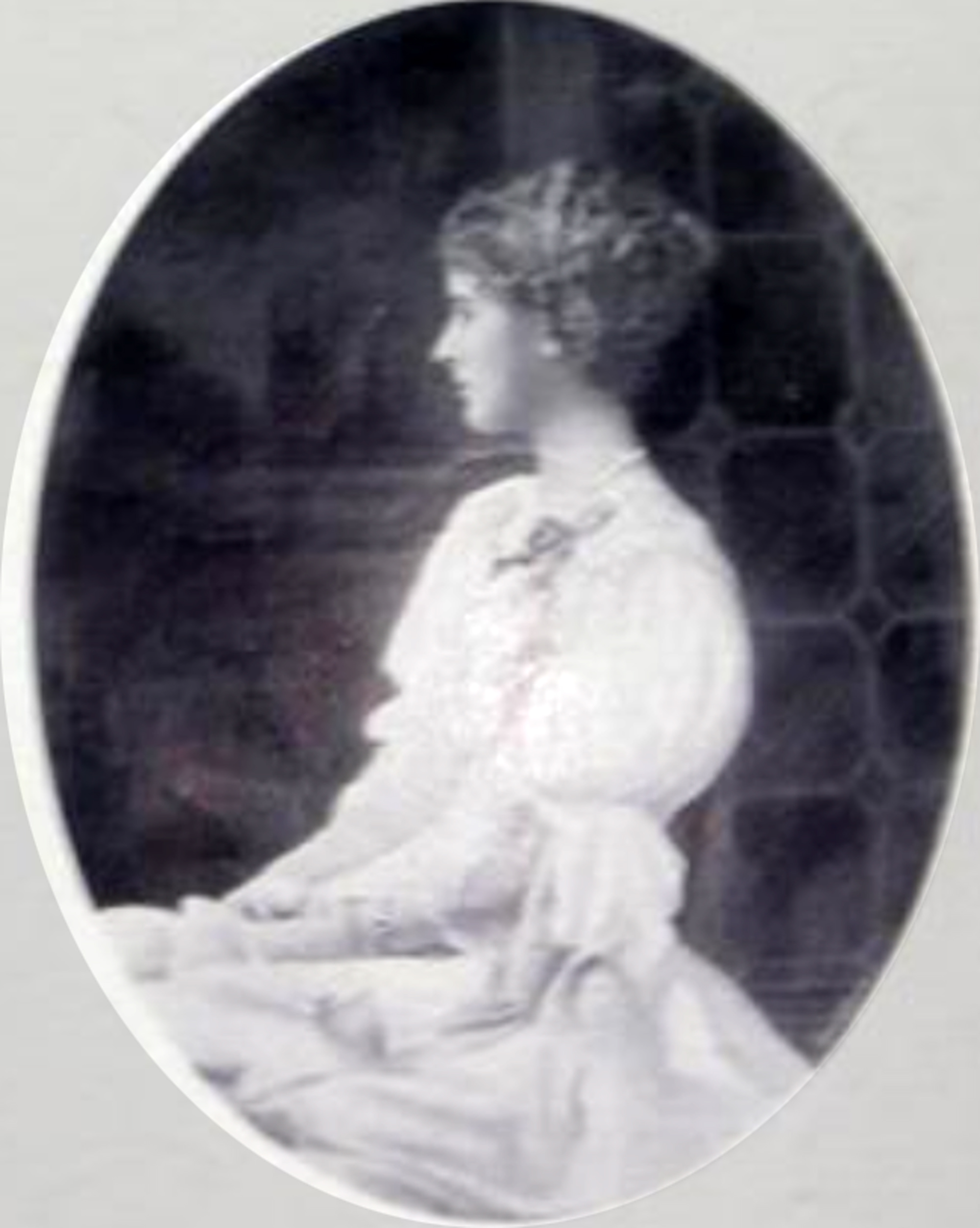
Lady Olivia Bentinck in 1900

The Cavendish-Bentincks enjoyed giving large parties and balls at Underley Hall and were frequently mentioned in the newspapers. In 1898 they had the house extensively redecorated and after it was completed they held a garden party which was described in detail in the Westmorland Gazette. They said:

"The guests arrived about 3.30 and were received by Lord and Lady Bentinck on the south front. Collinson’s orchestral band was stationed in the front hall and discoursed some excellent music. Equally good was the celebrated prize brass band conducted by Mr Owen which was stationed in the rose gardens. Refreshments were supplied in a large marquee in the grounds.

The invitation was extended to all persons above 17 in the surrounding townships and close to 2000 gathered on the spacious Underley Hall grounds. Guests were encouraged to visit Casterton Woods and the hall and gardens were thrown open. A temporary platform had been arranged on the lawn for dancing."

The sister of Lord Henry Bentinck was Lady Ottoline Morrell who was a famous socialite. She made numerous visits to Underley Hall and took photographs of her relatives. The photo at this reference shows Olivia sitting on the front steps of the Hall with her dog in 1935.
