= El Rio Rey =

American Thoroughbred racehorse

- Sire: Norfolk
- Grandsire: Lexington
- Dam: Marian
- Damsire: Malcolm
- Sex: Stallion
- Foaled: January 16, 1887
- Died: January 16, 1912
- Country: United States
- Color: Bay
- Breeder: Theodore Winters
- Owner: Theodore Winters
- Trainer: Alfred H. Estell
- Record: 7: 7-0-0
- Earnings: US$46,835

Major wins
- Hyde Park Stakes (1889); Kenwood Stakes (1889); Dunmow Stakes (1889); Brewers Stallion Stakes (1889); Great Eclipse Stakes (1889); White Plains Handicap (1889); Prospect Stakes (1889)

Awards
- American Champion Two-Year-Old Colt (1889)

El Rio Rey (January 16, 1887 – January 16, 1912) was an undefeated American Thoroughbred racehorse. He was regarded as the American Champion Two-Year-Old Colt of 1889. He was bred and raced by Theodore Winters in whose honor the city of Winters, California was named.

== Breeding ==
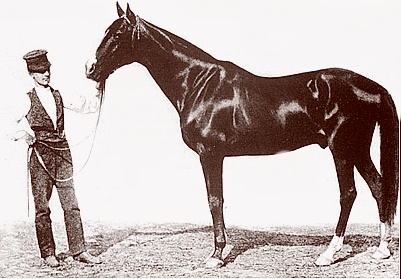
Norfolk, the sire of El Rio Rey

He was bred by Theodore Winters at his Rancho del Rio breeding farm near Sacramento, California where he stood both El Rio Rey's sire, Norfolk and his dam, Marian (1871–1893). Marian was also the dam of Yo Tambien as a result of Theodore Winters mating her to his stallion, Joe Hooker. El Rio Rey was a full brother to the racehorse, Emperor of Norfolk and Czar as well as six other horses. These colts were inbred to Glencoe in the third and fourth (3m x 4f) generation.

== Racing record ==
El Rio Rey's race conditioning was supervised by the head of the Theodore Winters racing stable, Alfred H. Estell, as well as trainer William H. McCormick. As a two-year-old racing in 1889, El Rio Rey competed at racetracks in Chicago and St. Louis, Missouri before heading to New York City. The publicity surrounding his racing abilities as a full brother to the great Emperor of Norfolk drew a huge crowd to Morris Park Racecourse to see him win the August 25 Great Eclipse Stakes. On the same track, he then won the inaugural running of the six furlong (1,200 meters) White Plains Handicap on August 31, against a field of 14 horses in track record time while carrying 126 pounds (57 kilograms). The next day's issue of The New York Times declared him the best two-year-old in the country, stating that horsemen consider him "the greatest colt ever foaled." El Rio Rey followed up with another win in September's Prospect Stakes at the Gravesend Race Track. The colt ended his two-year-old campaign undefeated, having won all seven starts. In The Blood-Horse magazine's National Champion review, El Rio Rey was recognized as the American Champion Two-Year-Old Colt of 1889.

In 1890, El Rio Rey was scheduled to run, but breathing problems led to the belief that he was a roarer, and his career eventually ended without him making a start at age three.

== Retirement ==
Later in 1890, Theodore Winters sold his California properties to return to Nevada after he had been selected as the Democratic Party's candidate for Governor of Nevada. He relocated his breeding operations to his Rancho del Sierra in Nevada's Washoe Valley with El Rio Rey and Joe Hooker as his main stallions.

El Rio Rey sired some Californian race winners.

He died at the Winters Ranch on January 16, 1912.

== Sire line tree ==
- El Rio Rey
  - Scarborough
  - Bonus Res

== See also ==
- List of leading Thoroughbred racehorses
