= Raceland (horse) =

American-bred Thoroughbred racehorse

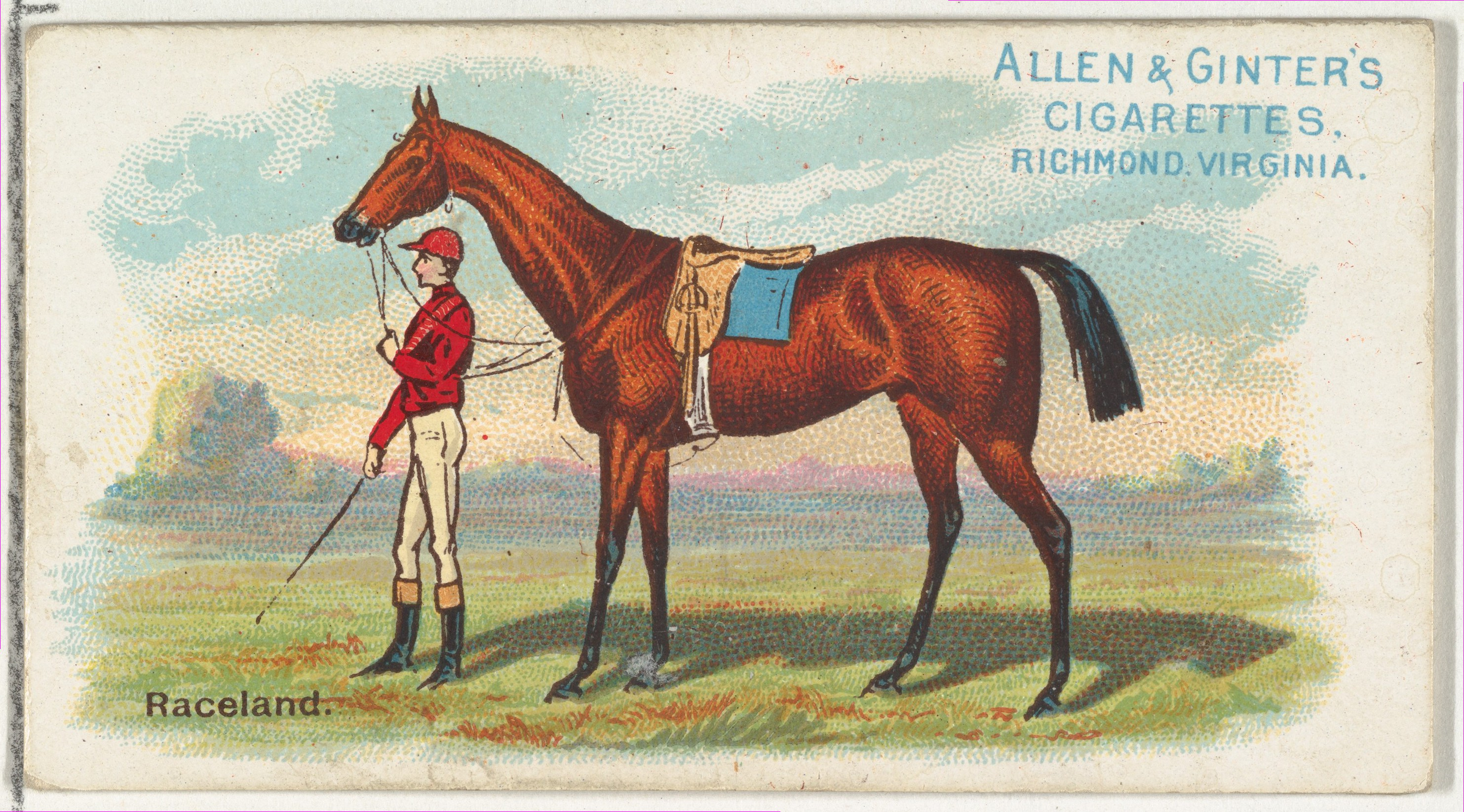
- From Allen & Ginter Cigarette card
- Sire: Billet
- Grandsire: Voltigeur
- Dam: Calomel
- Damsire: Canwell
- Sex: Gelding
- Foaled: 1885
- Country: United States
- Colour: Bay
- Breeder: Runnymede Farm
- Owner: 1) Joseph F. Ullman; 2) Dave Johnson (10/28/1887); 3) August Belmont (11/12/1887); 4) Mike Dwyer (12/28/1890)
- Trainer: 2) Frank McCabe (1888-1890); 3) Hardy Campbell, Jr. (1891-1894)
- Record: 130: 70-25-12
- Earnings: US$116,391

Major wins
- Great Eastern Handicap (1887); Spindrift Stakes (1888); Grand National Handicap (1888, 1889); Suburban Handicap (1889); Ocean Stakes (1889); Manhattan Handicap (1890); Freehold Stakes (1891)

Awards
- American Co-Champion Two-Year-Old Colt (1887)

Raceland (1885–1894) was an American Champion Thoroughbred racehorse.

== Background ==
Out of the mare Calomel, his British sire, Billet, was imported to stand at stud in the United States where in 1883 he was the Leading sire in North America. Grandsire Voltigeur won England's Epsom Derby and St. Leger Stakes in 1850.

Raceland was purchased and raced by Joseph F. Ullman, a native of St. Louis, Missouri who held a controlling interest in the East St. Louis Jockey Club and who was the preeminent bookmaker of the day.

== Racing career ==
Raceland became the dominant two-year-old competing in the United States in 1887. In mid September, Raceland won the Great Eastern Handicap at Sheepshead Bay Race Track, beating a field of sixteen of the best two-year-olds in the United States. After defeating Emperor of Norfolk in the Arlington Stakes at the Ivy City racetrack in Washington, D.C. on October 25, 1887, three days later in what The New York Times described as a "phenomenal performance," he won the six furlong Capital Stakes at Washington D.C. Immediately after the race, owner Joseph Ullman sold Raceland to Dave Johnson of the New York City betting firm, Appleby & Johnson. On November 12, August Belmont announced he had acquired the gelding from Johnson.

Among his wins at age three, Raceland defeated the great Firenze to win the mile and a half Grand National Handicap at Jerome Park Racetrack. Raceland went on to compete successfully for another six years during which time he would affectionately be called "Old Bones" by his fans. In 1889, he won the Suburban Handicap, at the time the most important race for older horses in the United States. In October he again beat Firenze to win his second straight edition of the Grand National Handicap at Jerome Park Racetrack. The following year, Raceland added the prestigious Manhattan Handicap to his résumé of wins.

At age six he won the Freehold Stakes at the Long Branch Racetrack in New Jersey, and at seven won the 1892 Cherry Diamond and New York Jockey Club Handicaps at Morris Park Racecourse as well as the Delaware Handicap at Long Branch Racetrack and was still winning at age eight in 1893. On May 16, 1894, he ran third in the Myrtle Stakes at Gravesend Race Track but in June was reported by The New York Times as dying from spinal meningitis. On June 28, 1894, at Sheepshead Bay racecourse, Raceland was euthanized.

== Pedigree ==
Pedigree of Raceland, bay gelding, 1885
Sire Billet	Voltigeur	Voltaire	Blacklock
Sire Billet	Voltigeur	Voltaire	Phantom Mare
Sire Billet	Voltigeur	Martha Lynn	Mullato
Sire Billet	Voltigeur	Martha Lynn	Leda
Sire Billet	Calcutta	Flatcatcher	Touchstone
Sire Billet	Calcutta	Flatcatcher	Decoy
Sire Billet	Calcutta	Miss Martin	St Martin
Sire Billet	Calcutta	Miss Martin	Wagtail
Dam Calomel	Canwell	Stockwell	The Baron
Dam Calomel	Canwell	Stockwell	Pocahontas
Dam Calomel	Canwell	May Bell	Hetman Platoff
Dam Calomel	Canwell	May Bell	Sultan mare
Dam Calomel	Dora	Australian	West Australian
Dam Calomel	Dora	Australian	Emilia
Dam Calomel	Dora	Lindora	Lexington
Dam Calomel	Dora	Lindora	Picayune (family: 1-h)
