= Jersey Act =

British Thoroughbred horse regulation (1913–1949)

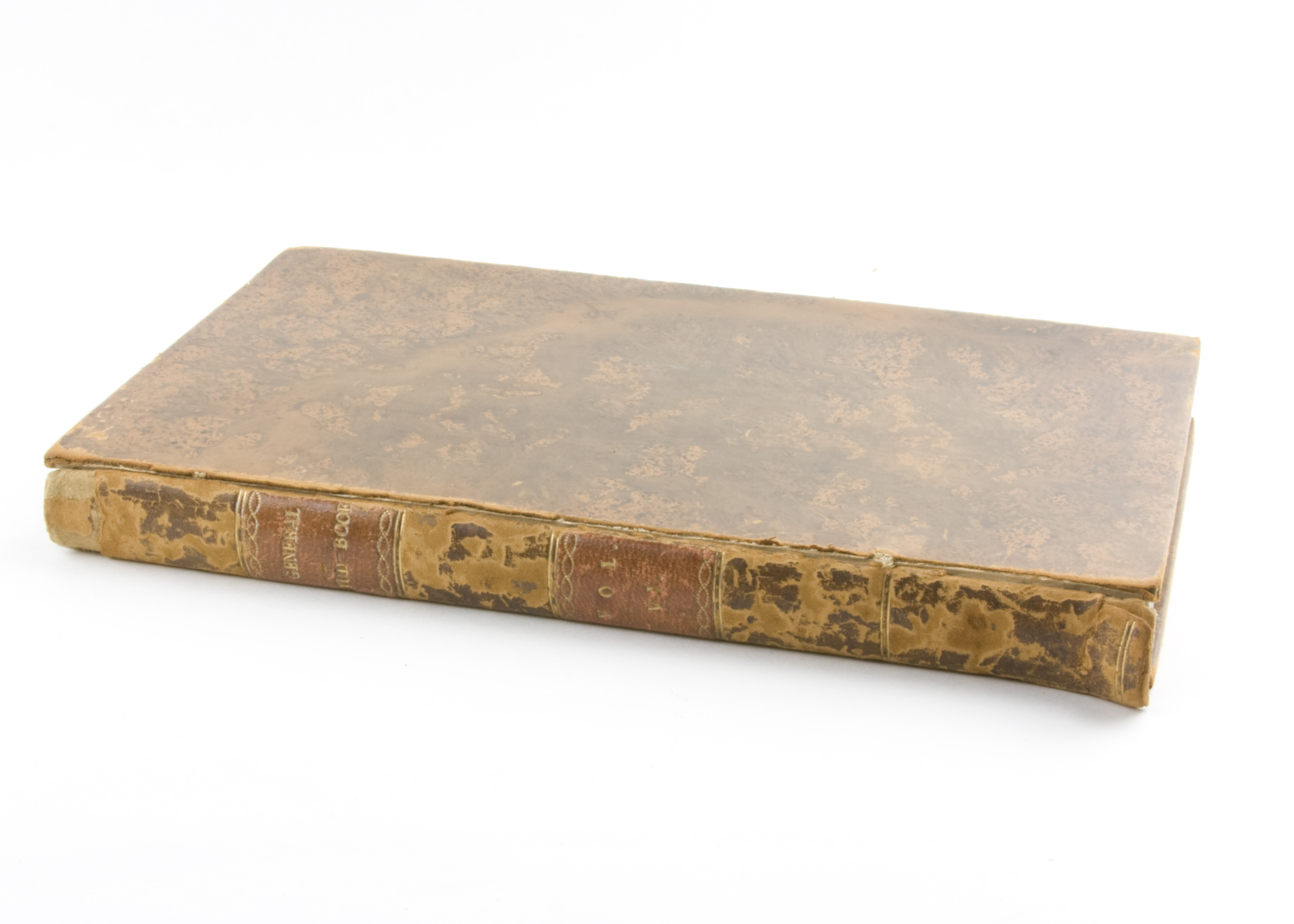
An early volume of the General Stud Book, Volume 6

The Jersey Act was a regulation introduced to prevent the registration of most American-bred Thoroughbred horses in the British General Stud Book. It had its roots in the desire of British horse breeders to halt the influx of American-bred racehorses of possibly impure bloodlines during the early 20th century. Many American-bred horses were exported to Europe to race and retire to a breeding career after a number of U.S. states banned gambling, which depressed Thoroughbred racing—and thus breeding—in the United States. The loss of breeding records during the American Civil War and the late beginning of the registration of American Thoroughbreds led many in the British racing establishment to doubt that the American-bred horses were purebred.

In 1913, the Jockey Club and the owners of the General Stud Book passed a regulation named by the foreign press after the Jockey Club's senior steward, Lord Jersey, prohibiting the registration of horses in the book unless all of their ancestors had been registered. Despite protests from American breeders, the regulation remained in force until 1949. Among the factors influencing its relaxation were the racing success of ineligible horses in Europe and the damage caused to British and Irish breeders by the unavailability of French Thoroughbreds during and after the Second World War. In addition, by 1949, the possibly impure ancestors of the American bloodlines had receded far back in most horses' ancestry.

== Background ==
Before the introduction in 1913 of what became popularly known—"with questionable taste" according to a correspondent writing in The Times—as the Jersey Act, Thoroughbred horses in the United Kingdom were registered in the General Stud Book, the stud book for British and Irish Thoroughbreds. The rules allowed a horse to be registered if all of the horse's ancestors were registered in the General Stud Book or if it had been bred outside of Britain or Ireland and was registered in the stud book of its country of origin. Overall the General Stud Book had the most stringent rules for registration of Thoroughbreds at the time, around 1900; other countries, including the United States, France, Australia and Russia, were considered by the British and Irish to be much laxer and to have allowed some non-Thoroughbred horses into their national stud books.

The outlawing of race-track betting in parts of the United States between 1900 and 1913 led to a large influx of American-bred horses into Britain and Ireland, giving rise to fears among British breeders that they would be swamped by the American bloodlines and their own stock would become worthless. The biggest state to outlaw betting was New York, which passed the Hart–Agnew Law in 1908. By 1911, the average price for yearlings sold at auction was at a record low of $230 ($7,950 as of 2025). Before 1900, most horses were imported into Britain to race, and rarely stayed for a breeding career. The outlawing of gambling resulted in large numbers of American horses that could no longer be supported, and many were shipped to Europe for racing. Because of the downturn in the horse market in the United States, it was assumed that most of the horses sent to Europe would stay there permanently and, after retirement from the racetrack, would enter their breeding careers outside of the United States. Between 1908 and 1913, over 1,500 Thoroughbreds were exported from the United States. Those exported included 24 horses who had been or would later become champions – among them Artful, Colin, Henry of Navarre, Peter Pan, and Ballot.

The American Stud Book, the registration book for American Thoroughbreds, was not founded until 1873, much later than the General Stud Book, (Note: The first volume of the General Stud Book appeared in 1791.) and the rules for registration required only that a horse have five generations of ancestors in the American Stud Book or other national stud books, unlike the General Stud Book rules. In addition, many breeding records were destroyed during the American Civil War, as fighting during that conflict took place in noted American Thoroughbred breeding centers. The result was that most American Thoroughbreds in 1913 were unable to show an unblemished pedigree according to the General Stud Book rules. Adding to the problem was that American horses were beginning to win the big horse races in England, starting with Iroquois, who won the 1881 Epsom Derby.

J. B. Haggin, an American breeder and owner of Elmendorf Farm, had begun to ship large contingents of horses to England for sale, including the 1908 Grand National steeplechase winner Rubio, and the fear was that if other American breeders followed his lead, the English racing market would be overwhelmed. As a first step, the English racing authorities began to limit the number of training licences at Newmarket Racecourse, turning away a number of American breeders. The General Stud Book rules for registration were also amended in 1909 to restrict registration to horses whose ancestry could be traced entirely to horses already registered in the General Stud Book, but horses registered in other national stud books were still allowed to be imported and registered.

== Introduction ==
The owners of the General Stud Book, Weatherbys, consulted with the Jockey Club, the United Kingdom's racing authority, and discussions were held about the problems in pedigrees recorded in the American Stud Book. At a meeting of the Jockey Club in spring 1913, Victor Child Villiers, Lord Jersey, the club's senior steward, proposed a resolution limiting the registration of American bloodlines. It passed unanimously in May, and a new regulation was placed in the General Stud Book, Volume 22:

No horse or mare can, after this date, be considered as eligible for admission unless it can be traced without flaw on both sire's and dam's side of its pedigree to horses and mares themselves already accepted in the earlier volumes of the book. (Note: Admission means registration in this instance.)

Although named the Jersey Act by a critical foreign press, after Lord Jersey, the new regulation did not have the force of law as it was promulgated by the registration authorities of the Thoroughbred horse, not by the United Kingdom government. Nor was it promulgated by the Jockey Club, which had no authority over registration, only over racing matters. The regulation required that any horse registered in the General Stud Book trace in every line to a horse that had already been registered in the General Stud Book, effectively excluding most American-bred Thoroughbreds.

== Effects ==
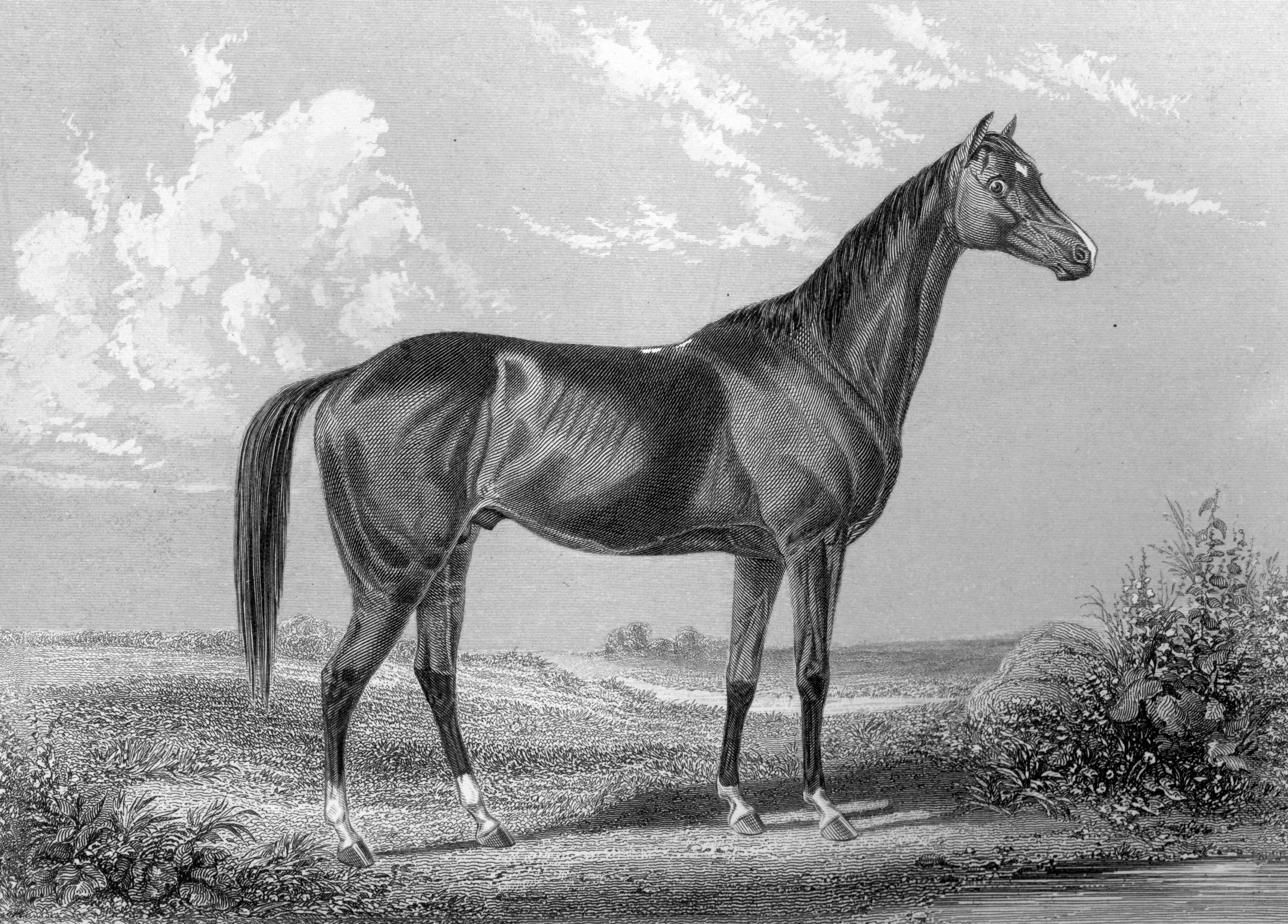
An 1857 engraving of Lexington

Because the new rule was not applied retroactively, all American-bred horses registered before 1913 remained on the register, and their descendants were also eligible for registration. Of the 7,756 mares in Volume 27 of the General Stud Book, published in 1933, 930 would have been ineligible under the new rule. The Jersey Act did have an immediate impact however, as the winner of the 1914 Epsom Derby, Durbar II, was ineligible for registration, as his dam, Armenia, was bred in the United States and was not herself eligible for the General Stud Book.

The main problem for American breeders was the presence of the blood of Lexington in their breeding programs. Lexington's pedigree on his dam's side was suspect in the eyes of British racing authorities, and, as he had been the leading sire of racehorses in the United States for 16 years, his descendants were numerous. Most American-bred Thoroughbreds traced to Lexington at least once, and he was not the only horse with suspect bloodlines registered in the American Stud Book.

Most British breeders thought the regulation necessary and welcomed it, whereas most American breeders found it insulting and believed that it was intended merely to protect the British racehorse market. The rule did adversely affect many British breeders as well, though, including even one senior member of the Jockey Club, Lord Coventry, whose successful line of racehorses was ineligible for registration. Initially there was little foreign complaint or organized opposition, probably owing to the effect of the gambling bans in the United States on the domestic horse market. The American Jockey Club did not even remark on the Jersey Act in its official publication, the Racing Calendar, and no mention of it appears in the Jockey Club's meeting minutes for 1913. Contributing to the lack of outcry was a legal ruling in New York allowing oral betting at racetracks, which led to the growth of racing in the United States; by 1920, the American breeding market had rebounded and was booming.

The Jersey Act did not prevent the racing of horses with the banned bloodlines, as horses with suspect breeding raced and won in England, but they were considered to be "half-bred". A number of American-bred horses carrying the lines of Lexington had already been imported into England, including Americus, Rhoda B, and Sibola, and because they were grandfathered in, they and their descendants were allowed to be registered in the General Stud Book. (Note: Americus was an ancestor of Mumtaz Mahal, herself an ancestor of Nasrullah. Sibola was an ancestor of Nearco. Both of these stallions were very influential in Thoroughbred breeding.) Nor did it prevent the racing of horses that were not registered in the General Stud Book; it just prevented registration in the General Stud Book. American bloodlines, whether registered in the General Stud Book or not, dominated English racing in the 1920s and 1930s. Horses that were ineligible for General Stud Book registration, but were allowed to race, were identified with a Maltese cross in programs and auction listings.

A number of American breeders, including the then-chairman of the American Jockey Club, William Woodward Sr., lobbied hard throughout the 1930s to have the regulation removed. Woodward, and other defenders of the American bloodlines, argued that the racing performance of the horses proved their purity, even if they could not produce papers that did so. Woodward declared in 1935 that "If we do not get together, we will grow apart." Those arguing for keeping the Jersey Act in effect pointed out that the General Stud Book is a record of bloodlines, not a work recording racing ability.

The Jersey Act's major effect was the opposite of what was intended. In the years preceding the Second World War, British and Irish breeders had relied on imported Thoroughbreds from France to enrich their breeding lines, a source that was unavailable during the war. Concerns were beginning to be expressed that the situation might lead to excessive inbreeding. Additionally, by the end of the war American-bred lines were some of the most successful racing lines in the world, effectively making the British and Irish breeding programmes that did not use them second-rate, and harming the rebuilding of English racing. There were even calls for the creation of an international stud book to record all Thoroughbred pedigrees, thus eliminating any perceived slight on the bloodlines that were excluded from the General Stud Book.

== 1949 amendment ==
Weatherbys, publishers of the Stud Book, approached the Jockey Club in 1948 to ask if it agreed that the Jersey Act was "too restrictive". The rule was subsequently modified in June 1949, after the racing careers of a number of horses such as Tourbillon and Djebel persuaded the Jockey Club to reconsider. (Note: Tourbillon's maternal grandsire was Durbar II, who won the 1914 Epsom Derby and was the first winner of the Derby to be ineligible for the General Stud Book.) A number of French-bred Thoroughbreds began to race in England after the Second World War, but because they carried American lines they were considered half-breds. In 1948, two of England's five classic races were won by half-bred horses, My Babu and Black Tarquin, prompting the Jockey Club to amend the rule in the preface to the General Stud Book, to state that:

Any animal claiming admission from now onwards must be able to prove satisfactorily some eight or nine crosses pure blood, to trace back for at least a century, and to show such performances of its immediate family on the Turf as to warrant the belief in the purity of its blood. (Note: Crosses means generations of a pedigree, in this case that the pedigree goes back eight or nine generations.)

The amendment removed the stigma of not being considered purebred from American-bred horses. A major consideration was that by the late 1940s most of the horses with suspect pedigrees were so far back in most horses' ancestry that it no longer made much sense to exclude them. Neither did it make much sense to exclude some of the most successful racehorses in Europe from registration. Weatherby's further amended its regulations in 1969, introducing the word "thoroughbred" to describe the horses registered in previous volumes of the General Stud Book. In 2006, Blood-Horse Publications, publisher of The Blood-Horse magazine, chose the "repeal" of the Jersey Act as the 39th most important moment in American Thoroughbred horse racing history.
