= Yo Tambien (horse) =

American Thoroughbred racehorse

- Sire: Joe Hooker
- Grandsire: Monday
- Dam: Marian
- Damsire: Malcolm
- Sex: Filly
- Foaled: 1889
- Country: United States
- Colour: Chestnut
- Breeder: Theodore Winters
- Owner: Kendall Stable
- Trainer: General William Wynn
- Record: 73: 44–11–9
- Earnings: $89,480

Major wins
- Youthful Stakes (1891); Lakeview Handicap (1891); Garfield Park Derby (1892); Great Western Cap (1892); Tobacco Stakes (1892); Twin City Derby (1892); Boulevard Stakes (1892); Drexel Stakes (1892); Merchants' Stake (1893); Cincinnati Hotel Handicap (1893); Match race against Hawthorne (1893); St. Louis Brewers' Stakes (1894); Foster Memorial Handicap (1894); Spencer Handicap (1894)

Honours
- Yo Tambien Handicap at Hawthorne Race Course

Yo Tambien (1889–1896) was an American Thoroughbred racing filly bred in California by Theodore Winters, a breeder and major landholder from the Washoe Valley in Nevada who was sometimes called "Black T" due to his huge, black, T-shaped moustache.

== California background ==
Theodore Winters was one of the foremost horsemen who founded Thoroughbred racing and breeding in California. Winters had gone west because of the California Gold Rush. Once there, he made his money as a businessman and by dealing in gold mining stock. Besides owning a huge spread near the present town of Winters in Yolo County, California, called Rancho del Arroyo, he owned another California farm on the banks of the Sacramento River near Sacramento called Rancho del Rio. On Rancho del Rio, he kept his best stallion, Norfolk, by the great stallion Lexington.

Meanwhile, in the 1870s, the founder of California's first sporting paper, the "Breeder and Sportsman" Joseph Cairn Simpson, had also come west, bringing a few horses. The best one was his homebred Illinois mare called Marian. To help finance his newspaper venture, Simpson sold Marian to "Black T" Winters. (Simpson eventually organized the Pacific Coast Blood Horse Association as well as becoming a founding member of the National Trotting Association.) For years, Winters bred Norfolk to Marian, and almost every one of their ten foals proved exceptional, two among them in particular: Emperor of Norfolk and El Rio Rey. When Norfolk grew too old, Winters put Marian to a California-bred horse he owned called Joe Hooker, also a tail-male descendant of Lexington. Joe Hooker had, as well, the distinction of being a half-brother to the racing mare Mollie McCarty.

== Marian and Joe Hooker ==
Joe Hooker had had a brief and difficult racing career, but many turfmen believed him the fastest race horse California had ever seen. When Winters bought him, already owning Norfolk, he gave him little thought. He bred him to a few Rancho del Arroyo mares, and then sent him on to this third ranch, the Rancho del Sierra in Washoe Valley, Nevada, to run in a pasture with a few lesser mares for company. When the Rancho del Arroyo mares started dropping Joe Hooker foals who were winners, Winters brought Joe Hooker back to the main breeding barn near Sacramento. The first mare he bred him to was his best mare, Marian. The result of the 1888 match between Marian and Joe Hooker was Yo Tambien.

Yo Tambien (Spanish for Me Too) was, like her father, a bright chestnut. Joe Hooker was a showy horse, and passed that showiness on to his daughter who turned out to be his best offspring. Yo Tambien won the most and raced the longest. In the Gay Nineties, she was called "Queen of the Turf."

== Racing days ==
Winters began racing Yo Tambien at the San Francisco Bay District Course as a two-year-old. She easily won her first race and then took the Youthful Stakes. Winters immediately sent her east to compete against the best fillies of her day. By the end of her first season, she'd started 14 times and won eight races, four in succession. Her losses were said by Winters to be due to her high strung nature. Before she reached the starting line, she was often exhausted.

Before her second season, "Black T" Winters decided to withdraw from the actual racing of his horses and to concentrate on breeding them. To this end, he shipped his juveniles, including Yo Tambien, to the Crescent City Jockey Club in Chicago to sell. Gambler and horseman Chris Smith bought them all. Yo Tambien alone cost him $17,000. For the rest of her career, she raced for Smith's Kendall Stables.

At the age of three, Yo Tambien ran sixteen times and won fourteen times. In newspaper articles of the day, she was called "Queen of the Turf." She made the greatest impact in the Garfield Park Derby, in which she carried 127 pounds and was the sole filly against the best colts in the west. One was that year's winner of the Kentucky Derby, Azra. In the Great Western Handicap, carrying much more weight than rivals, Yo Tambien clocked the mile and a half race at 2 minutes 33 and ¾ seconds. After the Great Western, Smith was offered $35,000 for her, at the time a huge sum.

In her third season at four, Yo Tambien made 17 starts, winning 11 and placing in four. She came in third in the remaining two races. In her best race of 1893, she beat the very good mare Racine and went on an eight-race winning streak. In 1894, she won ten of 18 starts.

At the age of six, Yo Tambien won only one of her nine starts, and the decision was made to retire her. Her earnings were the third highest for a mare in US history at the time. Only Miss Woodford and Firenze won more.

== Ending ==
Yo Tambien was sent to the McGrathiana Stud in Kentucky to begin her career as a broodmare. She was successfully bred to the great Hanover (enjoying one of his best years at stud), but one day, pregnant and in turn-out in her paddock, she became so seriously impaled on a loose board she had to be destroyed.

Yo Tambien died in 1896 at age seven.
