= George Kinney =

American-bred Thoroughbred racehorse

- Sire: Bonnie Scotland
- Grandsire: Iago
- Dam: Kathleen
- Damsire: Lexington
- Sex: Stallion
- Foaled: 1880
- Country: United States
- Breeder: James Franklin
- Owner: Dwyer Brothers
- Trainer: James G. Rowe Sr.
- Record: 25 - 9 - 2
- Earnings: $63,875

Major wins
- Flash Stakes (1882); Hopeful Stakes (1882); Kentucky Stakes (1882); Withers Stakes (1883); Lorillard Stakes (1882); Jerome Stakes (1883); Kenner Stakes (1883); Dixie Stakes (1883); Grand National Handicap (1883) American Classics wins: Belmont Stakes (1883)
- Last updated on March 4, 2022

George Kinney was an American Thoroughbred racehorse best known for winning the 1883 Belmont Stakes.

== Background ==
George Kinney was bred in Tennessee by Captain James Franklin at Kennesaw Stud. His dam was Kathleen, a daughter of the great sire Lexington, and his father was Bonnie Scotland, a great imported sire. He was sold to the Dwyer Brothers Stable, owned by Philip J. Dwyer and Michael F. Dwyer.

== Racing career ==
As a two-year-old, George Kinney won the Flash Stakes, the Hopeful Stakes, and the Kentucky Stakes. His win at the Flash Stakes was particularly notable, as he beat his stablemate and top filly Miss Woodford.

During his three-year-old season, George Kinney won the Withers Stakes, and was the heavy favorite in the 1883 Belmont Stakes. His winning of the race was considered such a sure thing that bookmakers offered a special bet that included all of three of the other horses that would be running against him. George Kinney ended up winning the race by two lengths.

George Kinney went on to win a number of other races as a three-year-old, including the Lorillard Stakes, the Jerome Stakes, the Kenner Stakes, the Dixie Stakes, and the Grand National Handicap. He came second in Pimlico Stakes, beaten by the filly he'd previously triumphed over, Miss Woodford. He also came second in that year's Ocean Stakes, and third in the Sequel Stakes. He was beaten in the Potomac Stakes by Duke Carter, and did not place in that race.

As a four-year-old, George Kinney was starting to slow down. He came second in that year's Ocean Stakes, beaten once again by Miss Woodford. Overall, he started 38 times, won 25, placed 9 times, and came in third twice. His total career earnings were $63,875.

== Pedigree ==
Pedigree of George Kinney
Sire Bonnie Scotland 1853	Iago 1843	Don John	Waverly
Sire Bonnie Scotland 1853	Iago 1843	Don John	Comus Mare
Sire Bonnie Scotland 1853	Iago 1843	Scandal	Selim
Sire Bonnie Scotland 1853	Iago 1843	Scandal	Haphazard Mare
Sire Bonnie Scotland 1853	Queen Mary 1843	Gladiator	Partisan
Sire Bonnie Scotland 1853	Queen Mary 1843	Gladiator	Pauline
Sire Bonnie Scotland 1853	Queen Mary 1843	Plenitpotentiary Mare	Plenipotentiary
Sire Bonnie Scotland 1853	Queen Mary 1843	Plenitpotentiary Mare	Myrrha
Dam Kathleen 1867	Lexington 1850	Boston	Timoleon
Dam Kathleen 1867	Lexington 1850	Boston	Sister to Tuckahoe
Dam Kathleen 1867	Lexington 1850	Alice Carneal	Sarpedon
Dam Kathleen 1867	Lexington 1850	Alice Carneal	Rowena
Dam Kathleen 1867	Maria Innis 1853	Yorkshire	St Nicholas
Dam Kathleen 1867	Maria Innis 1853	Yorkshire	Miss Rose
Dam Kathleen 1867	Maria Innis 1853	Ann Innis	American Eclipse
Dam Kathleen 1867	Maria Innis 1853	Ann Innis	Miss Obstinate
