= Parole (horse) =

American thoroughbred racehorse

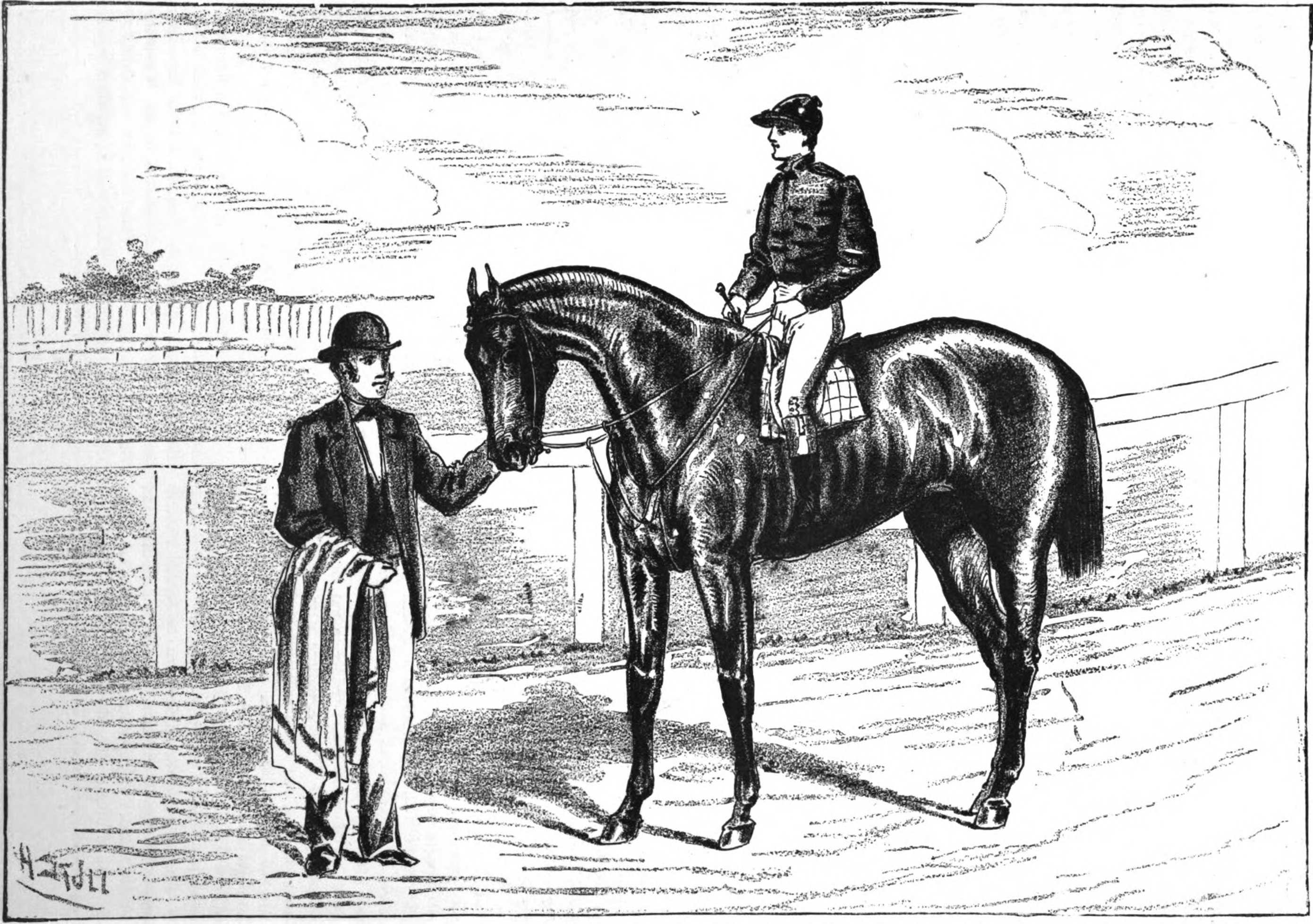
- 1877 etching by Henry Stull
- Sire: Leamington
- Grandsire: Faugh-a-Ballagh
- Dam: Maiden
- Damsire: Lexington
- Sex: Gelding
- Foaled: 1873
- Country: United States
- Colour: Brown
- Breeder: Pierre Lorillard IV
- Owner: Aristides Welch
- Trainer: William Brown
- Record: 138: 59–28–17
- Earnings: $82,816

Major wins
- August Stakes (1877); July Stakes (1877); Kentucky Stakes (1877); Saratoga Cup (1877, 1878); Baltimore Special (1877); Newmarket Handicap (1879); City and Suburban Handicap (1879); Great Metropolitan (1879); Epsom Gold Cup (1879)

Awards
- American Champion Two-Year-Old Colt (1875)

Honours
- U.S. Racing Hall of Fame (1984)
- Last updated on January 17, 2010

Parole (1873–1903) was a Thoroughbred race horse bred by Pierre Lorillard, a scion of the tobacco family. Lorillard and his brother George were both horsemen and competed throughout their careers. Pierre founded the Rancocas Stable in New Jersey named after the New Jersey town where he owned a country manor.

== Background ==
Parole's sire was Leamington, who also produced Longfellow, Aristides (named by his breeder for Aristides Welch, who had imported Leamington to the US)—winner of the first Kentucky Derby—and Iroquois, first American-bred horse to win The Derby and the St Leger Stakes.

== Racing career ==
=== America ===
According to the National Museum of Racing and Hall of Fame, at two Parole was considered the best juvenile racing. He was also, by many, thought the best four- and five-year-old. At four he beat the good gelding Shirley (by Lexington) in the August Stakes. Shirley had won the Preakness Stakes. Parole also won the Saratoga Cup, but more importantly he beat both Ten Broeck and Tom Ochiltree in the Baltimore Special at Pimlico Race Course on October 24, 1877. Both of these horses were considered the best horses in the West as well as the East. In 1877, Ten Broeck had won eight races in a row. One was a walkover since no one would enter against him, and two were races against time for the same reason. Tom Ochiltree, owned by Pierre Lorillard's brother George, was huge, standing above sixteen hands. One of the last sons of Lexington, he, like Shirley, had won the Preakness Stakes. Parole was younger than either of them. Earlier he had beaten Tom Ochiltree in the Saratoga Cup, but in later races, Tom had beaten him twice. Congress adjourned for the day to attend this Baltimore, Maryland event. Throughout most of the race, Ten Broeck led and Parole trailed. But by the end Parole was coming on fast. He lapped Tom Ochiltree and then passed Ten Broeck, taking the race by four lengths.

The owners of both losers reported that their horses had been seen coughing before the race. In any case, both horses were retired at the end of the year. But Parole, as a gelding, went on racing.

=== England ===
Although Parole was owned by the Pennsylvanian breeder Aristides Welch, Lorillard took his brother George Lorillard's horse, Duke of Magenta (by Lexington), and his stablemate, the six-year-old Parole, as well as a number of other horses (Cherokee, Friar, Pappoose, Geraldine, Boreas, Nereid, and Uncas), to England in a serious effort to have an American horse win an English race. Parole went as a trial horse.

On his arrival in England, the English press called Parole the "Yankee Mule." Sam Hildreth, in his book "The Spell of the Turf," said he was called "light-necked, rough-coated, leggy and curby knocked."

While there, the Duke of Magenta became ill with influenza, allowing Parole an opportunity to prove his worth. Within one week in April, Parole won the Newmarket Stakes (on Apr. 16th, defeating Isonomy) and the City and Suburban Handicap (on Apr. 22nd, defeating 17 horses, including Ridotto). The following day he won the Great Metropolitan which was set at two and a half miles. Only one horse opposed him, Castlereagh, because no other owner wanted to continue competing against Parole. Parole carried 124 pounds against Castlereagh's 110. The English were amazed at this performance but American horses were used to running in grueling heats.

=== Back to America ===
Parole took four back-to-back races as soon he arrived home, and he went on racing until 1884 when he was twelve years old, winning 59 of his 138 starts and earning over $80,000. (Note: Parole's racing statistics shown here were the product of a revision in January 2010; eleven additional races (that he ran as a twelve-year-old in 1885) missing from previous compilations were discovered. The National Museum of Racing's historian confirmed the finding and revised the museum's Hall of Fame website data to reflect it – see link in References below. The information necessarily conflicts with the abundance of the histories printed heretofore.)

== Retirement ==
When his racing career ended, Parole was America's leading money winner and the best gelding of his era. He died on January 1, 1903, at age 30, and was inducted into the Hall of Fame in 1984.

== Sources ==
- Kirk's Guide to the Turf
- American Turf Register
- Hildreth, Samuel C.; Crowell, James R. (1926), The Spell of the Turf, J. B. Lippincott & Co.
- Robertson, William H. P. (1964), The History of Thoroughbred Racing in America, New York: Bonanza Press
