= Yo Tambien =

Yo También or Yo Tambien may refer to:

- Yo Tambien (horse) (1889–1896), American Thoroughbred racing filly
- Yo, también, 2009 Spanish drama film
- "Yo También" (song), by Romeo Santos featuring Marc Anthony, 2014
- #YoTambién, Spanish name for the #MeToo movement
