= Edward Troye =

Swiss-American painter (1808–1874)

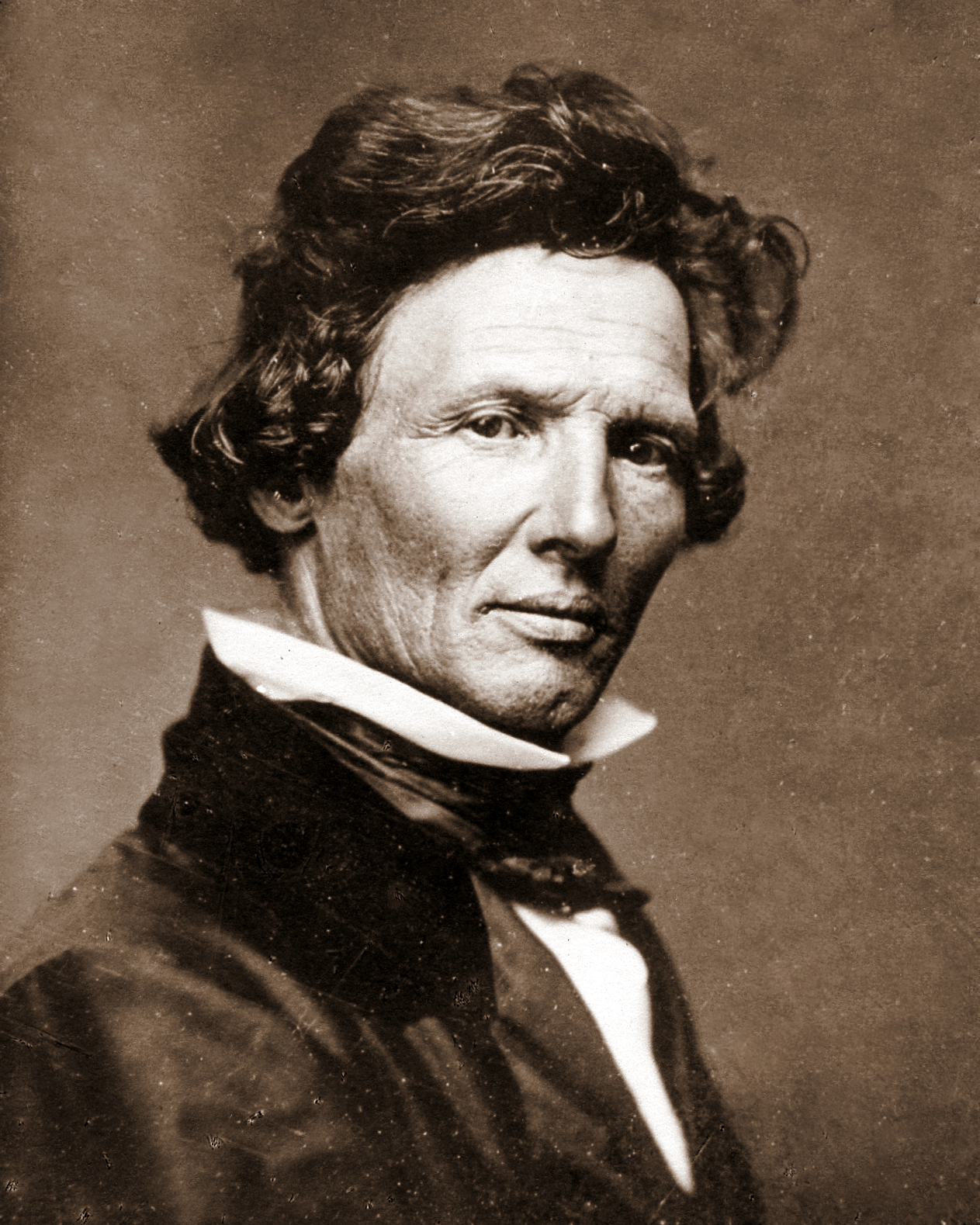
- Edward Troye
- Born: 12 July 1808; Lausanne, Switzerland
- Died: 25 July 1874 (aged 66); Georgetown, Kentucky, US
- Resting place: Georgetown Cemetery (Georgetown, KY)
- Known for: Painter, teacher
- Movement: Realism
- Spouse: Corneila Van de Graff

Edward Troye (12 July 1808 – 25 July 1874) was a Swiss-born American painter best known for his portraits of Thoroughbred horses.

== Early life and background ==
Troye was born on July 12, 1808, in Lausanne, Switzerland.

== Travels ==
At age 20 he emigrated to the West Indies, and later on to Philadelphia, Pennsylvania, where he was an employed artist of Sartain's Magazine.

== Career as painter ==
=== Life in Kentucky ===
On July 16, 1839, Troye married Corneila Van de Graff of Scott County, Kentucky, and settled in Central Kentucky where he lived for the next 35 years.

While living in Kentucky, Troye painted portraits and race horses for the local families in Georgetown, Kentucky. He worked primarily for the Steele and Alexander families, and Alexander "Keene" Richards.

Troye taught French and drawing at Spring Hill College, 1849–1855.

=== Later travels and move to Alabama ===
Later he and Richards traveled to the Holy Land where he painted horses, Damascus, Syria cattle, the Dead Sea and the bazaar of Damascus while Richards bought Arabian horses. Bethany College, West Virginia, retains copies of some of these paintings.

In 1869, Troye moved his family to a 700-acre (2.8 km^{2}) cotton plantation in Madison County, Alabama. Troye returned to Kentucky and resided at the home of longtime friend Keen Richards until his death from pneumonia on July 25, 1874.

== Death and legacy ==
Troye's best works, between the years 1835 and 1874 (prior to the birth of photography), are true-to-life delineations of historical American Great Plains horses. He painted Southern United States pre-American Civil War thoroughbreds. Little was known of Troye's work in the eastern United States until 1912. Since then, more than 300 of his paintings have been found, of which three-fourths have been photographed since 1912. In addition, he is the author of The Race Horses of America (1867).

Troye is buried in Georgetown Cemetery with his wife and grandson, Clarence D. Johnson.

== Notable horse paintings ==
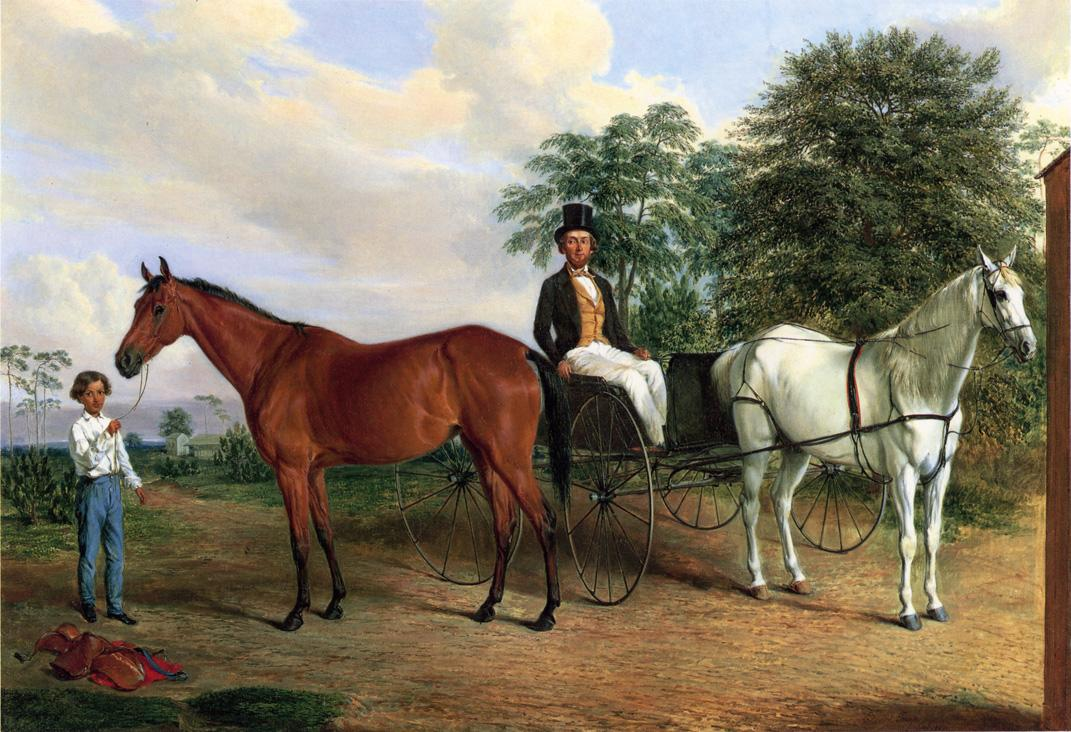
Self Portrait in a Carriage, oil on canvas, 1852, Yale University Art Gallery

- American Eclipse and Sir Henry
- Bertrand
- Black Maria
- Boston and his son, Lexington
- Glencoe I
- Kentucky
- Lecomte
- Leviathan
- Longfellow
- Ophelia - dam of Gray Eagle
- Reality
- Reel
- Revenue
- Richard Singleton
- Ruthless
- Wagner
- West Australian
