= Tammany (horse) =

American-bred Thoroughbred racehorse

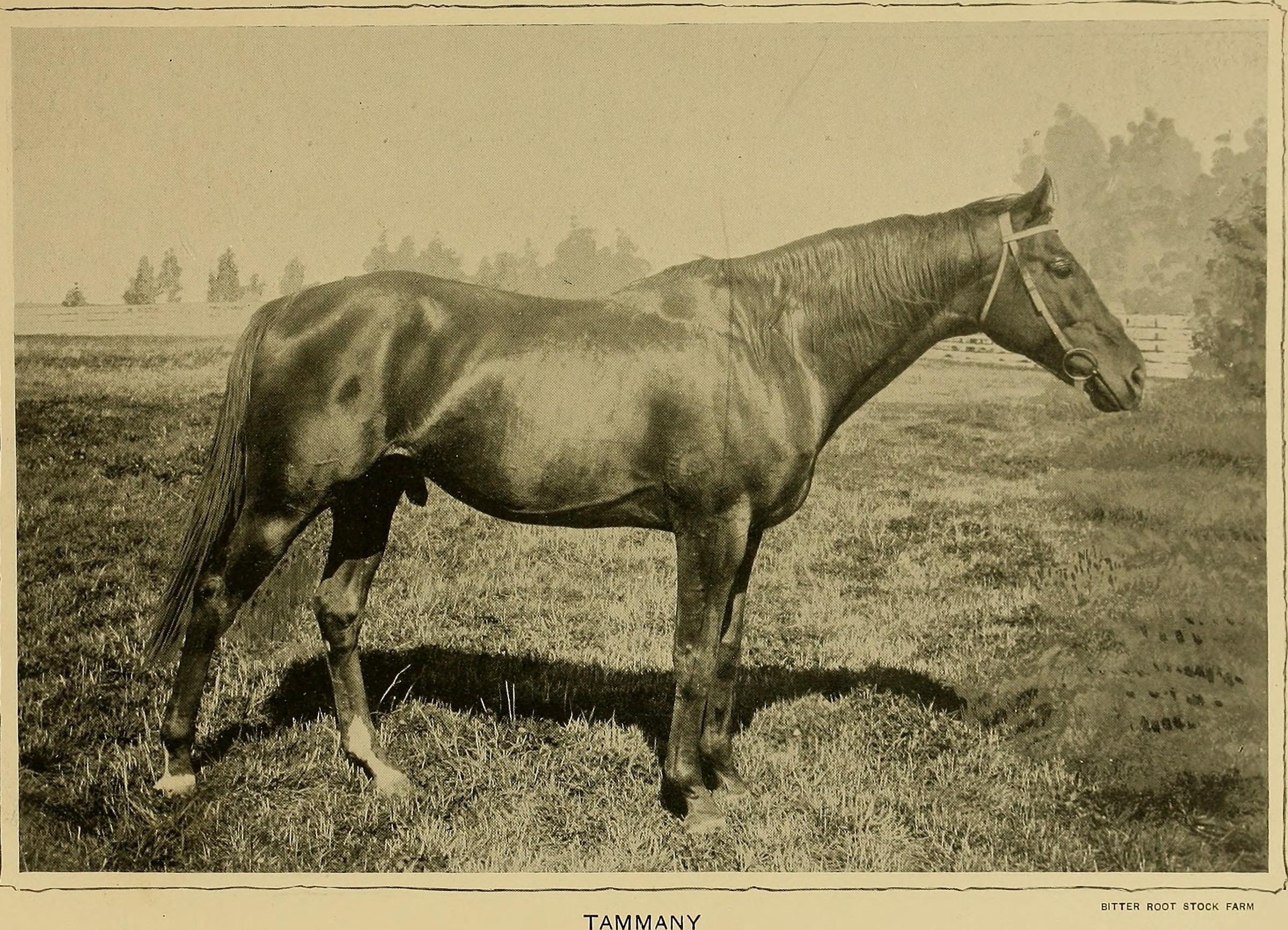
- Tammany c. 1896-1898
- Sire: Iroquois
- Grandsire: Leamington
- Dam: Tullahoma
- Damsire: Great Tom
- Sex: Stallion
- Foaled: 1889
- Country: United States
- Colour: Chestnut
- Breeder: William Hicks Jackson
- Owner: Marcus Daly
- Trainer: Matthew Byrnes
- Record: 14: 9-1–1
- Earnings: $113,290

Major wins
- Great Eclipse Stakes (1891); Lawrence Realization Stakes (1892); Jerome Handicap (1892); Withers Stakes (1892); Lorillard Stakes (1892); Second Special Stakes (1893)

Awards
- American Horse of the Year (1892)

Tammany was an American Thoroughbred race horse. He was the favorite horse owned by Montana Copper King, Marcus Daly. Out of the American mare Tullahoma, a granddaughter of King Tom, the leading sire in Great Britain & Ireland in 1870 and 1871, Tammany's sire was Iroquois, the first American horse ever to win England's Epsom Derby.

Tammany was the retrospective American Horse of the Year for 1892.

Tammany was bred in Tennessee and foaled there in 1889 at the Belle Meade Stud of William H. Jackson. Marcus Daly bought him in 1890 for $2,500. In 1893 there was a rivalry going on between Tammany and the favorite horse of the East, Lamplighter. A race was set up for the two horses in Guttenberg, New Jersey. Daly had said, "If Tammany beats Lamplighter, I'll build him a castle." Tammany won by 4 lengths. His "castle", originally an elegant barn, now a private home, is located on a hill about a mile east of Hamilton, MT.
