= John Benjamin Pryor =

American Thoroughbred racehorse trainer (1812–1890)

John Benjamin Pryor (1812 – December 26, 1890), was an American Thoroughbred racehorse trainer. He trained Lexington, a top racehorse of the 1850s whose excellence in competition and reputation as a sire stud continued well into the 20th century, earning the horse induction into the United States' National Museum of Racing and Hall of Fame in 1955.

== Birth and parentage ==
Born in 1812 in Virginia to parents Luke Pryor and Ann Batte Lane. His brother was US Senator Luke Pryor from Alabama.

== Family and career ==
John Benjamin Pryor was counted in Adams County, Mississippi on the 1850 and 1860 United States census. He was a slave owner and horse trainer, employed by the prominent Mississippi politician Adam Lewis Bingaman. He became the trainer of Lexington, the most famous race horse of the 1850s, after racing entrepreneur Richard Ten Broeck and his syndicate purchased the horse "in no very long time Lexington was shipped south to Natchez, where he was placed in charge of Adam Lewis Bingaman, whose stable was trained by the veteran J. B. Pryor, then at the head of his profession." Lexington's skeleton is displayed at the Smithsonian in Washington, DC and in the 1950s he was entered into the Thoroughbred Racing Hall of Fame in Saratoga Springs, New York.

By the 1861 UK Census Pryor had traveled to England, where he continued his employment as a horse trainer at Chesterfield House in Woodditton, Cambridgeshire, living with his wife Frances, sister in law Cordelia Bingaman, and 7 children. Pryor's family was still in England in 1871 and counted on the census at another racing establishment, Roden House in Compton, Berkshire.

== Return to United States ==
Pryor and his family returned to the United States aboard the ship Cimbria, entering New York City on October 12, 1872. By 1880 Pryor was living in Monmouth County, New Jersey. The 1880 United States census answers a question as to the possible identity of Pryor's wife. Although UK records reflect that Pryor had children born as early as 1849, neither his wife nor the children were recorded on the 1850 or 1860 US Census. In 1880 Pryor was recorded as "white" and his children's race as "mulatto" indicating that his wife may have been either a free African-American or a slave.

Pryor's sons also became horse trainers. Luke began his own training career in 1872 under the employment of avid sportsman August Belmont, namesake of the Belmont Stakes in the U.S. Triple Crown of Thoroughbred Racing. Luke Pryor was involved in a racing partnership with his brother, William. Allen Davis Pryor worked as a trainer at the Morris Park Racecourse in The Bronx. Also, son John Pryor worked as a horse trainer in New Jersey.

== See also ==
- Pharsalia Race Course – Mississippi horse-racing venue

== Other resources ==
"Tennessee Pryor website".
