= Eclipse Stakes (Morris Park) =

- Class: Discontinued stakes
- Location: Morris Park Racecourse (1889-1904); Westchester County, New York Belmont Park (1905-1910, 1914); Elmont, New York
- Inaugurated: 1889
- Race type: Thoroughbred - Flat racing

Race information
- Distance: 5 1/2 furlongs
- Surface: Dirt
- Track: left-handed
- Qualification: Two-year-olds
- Purse: $5,000 added

The Eclipse Stakes was an American Thorougbred race for two-year-old horses of either sex. Inaugurated August 24, 1889 at New York's Morris Park Racecourse with a then substantial purse of $28,000, from inception through 1894 the race was known as the Great Eclipse Stakes. Initially run at a distance of 6 furlongs, in 1897 the race was reduced to 5 1/2 furlongs. The Morris Park facility did not reopen after its 1904 racing season and in 1905 the event was taken up by the owners of the new Belmont Park racing facility in Elmont, New York where it would be run annually through 1907.

== Historical race notes ==
The end of the Eclipse Stakes came as a result of the 1908 passage of the Hart–Agnew anti-betting legislation by the New York Legislature under Republican Governor Charles Evans Hughes. Without income from wagering, racetracks throughout New York began cutting costs to survive and the Eclipse was one of its casualties.

The first edition of the Eclipse in 1889 was won by El Rio Rey, a colt bred in California by Theodore Winters for whom the city of Winters, California was named.

Tammany's win in the 1891 Great Eclipse Stakes was a surprise to not only the fans but to trainer Matthew Byrnes who regarded the colt as the least likely to win of the three horses he had in the race. The following year, three-year-old Tammany would continue his winning ways and earn 1892 American Horse of the Year recognition.

Blue Girl, winner of the May 24, 1901 Eclipse Stakes for owner/trainer John Madden, would finish the year as a Co-Champion Two-Year-Old Filly with Endurance by Right. The next year Blue Girl would earn the same honor but this time by herself as the 1902 three-year-old champion.

The final running of the Eclipse Stakes in 1907 was won by the great Hall of Fame inductee Colin.

In 1920, the Empire City Race Track revived usage of the name Eclipse for a short-lived race for older horses at a much longer distance.

== Records ==
Speed record:

- 1:04.50 @ 5 1/2 furlongs: Frohman (1897)
- 1:12.50 @ 6 furlongs: Tammany (1891)

Most wins by a jockey:

- 2 - Fred Taral (1892, 1893)
- 2 - Tod Sloan (1897, 1898)
- 2 - Danny Maher (1899, 1900)

Most wins by a trainer:

- 2 - John J. Hyland
- 2 - Sam Hildreth (1898, 1899)

Most wins by an owner:

- 2 - August Belmont Jr. (1896, 1902)

== Winners ==
Year	Winner	Age	Jockey	Trainer	Owner	Dist. (Furlongs)	Time	Win$
1907	Colin	2	George Mountain	James G. Rowe Sr.	James R. Keene	5.5 f	1:06.60	$8,235
1906	Water Pearl	2	Joe Jones	A. Jack Joyner	Sydney Paget	5.5 f	1:06.60	
1905	Vendor	2	Lucien Lyne	William H. Brooks	Francis R. Hitchcock	5.5 f	1:06.80	
1904	Glorifier	2	Willie Gannon	James H. McCormick	Louis V. Bell	5.5 f	1:05.50	
1903	Leonidas	2	George M. Odom	John W. Rogers	William Collins Whitney	5.5 f	1:07.60	$7,200
1902	Mizzen	2	John Bullman	John J. Hyland	August Belmont Jr.	5.5 f	1:05.00	$10,100
1901	Blue Girl	2	Tommy Burns	John E. Madden	John E. Madden	5.5 f	1:04.75	$7,980
1900	Irritable	2	Danny Maher	Thomas Welsh	C. Fleischmann Sons	5.5 f	1:06.50	
1899	His Royal Highness	2	Danny Maher	Sam Hildreth	John Daly	5.5 f	1:06.75	$9,845
1898	Jean Bereaud	2	Tod Sloan	Sam Hildreth	John Daly	5.5 f	1:05.00	$7,700
1897	Frohman	2	Tod Sloan	David Gideon	David Gideon	5.5 f	1:04.50	$7,700
1896	Don de Oro	2	Henry Griffin	John J. Hyland	Blemton Stable	6 f	1:13.50	$4,025
1895	Race not held							
1894	Connoisseur	2	Edward Garrison	Charles Littlefield Jr.	Charles Littlefield Jr.	6 f	1:15.00	$16,750
1893	Domino	2	Fred Taral	William Lakeland	James R. & Foxhall P. Keene	6 f	1:12.75	$16,750
1892	Sir Walter	2	Fred Taral	Walter C. Rollins	Oneck Stable	6 f	1:15.50	$16,740
1891	Tammany	2	Charles Miller	Matthew Byrnes	Marcus Daly	6 f	1:12.50	$24,335
1890	Sallie McClelland	2	George Anderson	Byron McClelland	Byron McClelland	6 f	1:14.00	$24,135
1889	El Rio Rey	2	Casey Winchell	Alfred H. Estell	Theodore Winters	6 f	1:14.00	$23,760
