= Americus (horse) =

19th and 20th-century American Thoroughbred racehorse exported to Europe

- Sire: Emperor of Norfolk
- Grandsire: Norfolk
- Dam: Clara D
- Damsire: Glenelg
- Sex: Stallion
- Foaled: 1892
- Country: United States
- Color: Bay
- Breeder: E. J. Baldwin
- Owner: Richard Croker

Major wins
- Culver Stakes (1895)

Americus (foaled 1892, died 1910), was an American Thoroughbred racehorse who was exported to England. He had some success as a racehorse, but was more notable for his influence at stud. He was bred in California and won the 1895 Culver Stakes prior to his export. He continued to race in England, until he was nine years old, while also standing as a breeding stallion. He stood at stud in Italy, Ireland, Germany, and Belgium before dying in Germany in 1910. Americus' most famous descendant was his great-granddaughter Mumtaz Mahal.

== Background ==
Americus, a bay stallion, was foaled (born) in 1892. He was bred in California by E. J. "Lucky" Baldwin. Americus was sired by Emperor of Norfolk and out of the mare Clara D who was sired by the imported stallion Glenelg. His maternal grandmother was a mare named The Nun, sired by Lexington. Americus was inbred to Lexington, as his sire was by Norfolk who was by Lexington. The Nun was a full sister to Norfolk, making Americus even more inbred. He was originally named Rey del Caredes, but occasionally raced under the name of Rey del Carreres.

== Racing career ==
Americus raced as a three-year-old in America, winning a number of races. In May 1895, he raced at Louisville under the ownership of the Santa Anita Stable, winning a race on May 14 at a distance of 5/8 of a mile. On May 20, he finished second in the Schulte Stakes. By June, he was at Coney Island, where he came in second in a sweepstakes race on June 15. On June 18, he lost a sweepstakes to Domino, finishing third. On July 4, he won a sweepstakes at a distance of 3/4 of a mile. As a three-year-old, Americus also won the Culver Stakes.

While still a three-year-old, Americus was exported to England where he was registered in the General Stud Book. He was imported by Richard Croker, at a cost of about 8000 guineas. Americus' importation to England occurred before the imposition of the Jersey Act, which allowed him and his offspring to be registered in the General Stud Book, something that would not have happened had he been imported into England after 1913, due to the Jersey Act's prohibition on registering horses tracing to Lexington in the General Stud Book.

His new owner continued to race Americus, even though he was no longer in prime racing condition. In 1899, as a seven-year-old, Americus was described as looking "as fat as a showyard bull" before he ran in the Stewards' Cup at Goodwood, but belied his appearance by running well for five furlongs before fading into fourth place. A year later he finished second in the same race. Americus also stood at stud in between races, and raced until he was nine years old. Americus was a sprinter, specializing in short-distance races.

== Stud record ==
In 1905 Americus was standing at stud in Ireland, but spent the years 1906 and 1907 in Italy. He returned to Ireland in 1908 and 1909, but in 1909 was sold and exported to Germany. It is unknown what happened to him after he went to Germany. At some point before his disappearance in Germany, he also stood at stud in Belgium. Americus died at the Trakehnen Stud in Germany in March 1910.

In his breeding career, Americus sired Americus Girl, the dam of Lady Josephine by Sundridge. Lady Josephine was in turn, the dam of Mumtaz Mahal, later owned by the Aga Khan and a famous broodmare.
