= Asteroid (horse) =

American-bred Thoroughbred racehorse

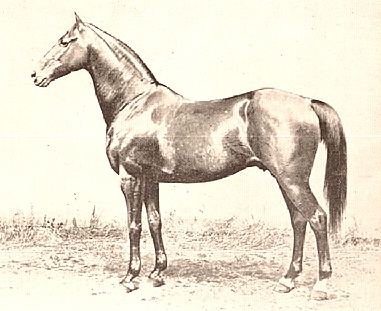
- Sire: Lexington
- Grandsire: Boston
- Dam: Nebula
- Damsire: Glencoe (GB)
- Sex: Stallion
- Foaled: 1861
- Country: United States
- Colour: Bay
- Breeder: Robert A. Alexander, Woodburn Stud
- Owner: R. A. Alexander & A. J. Alexander
- Record: 12:12-0-0
- Earnings: $9,700
- Last updated on 29 August 2009

Asteroid was an undefeated American Thoroughbred racehorse who was one of the most successful racehorses in the United States during the 19th century.

== Background ==
Asteroid was foaled in 1861 and was sired by the great racehorse and sire Lexington. His dam Nebula was by the imported Glencoe. This Lexington/Glencoe cross made him a three-quarters-brother-in-blood to Kentucky and the undefeated Norfolk. All of these colts were foaled in 1861. Asteroid was from an early American family, A34, Norfolk was from another American family A2, while Kentucky was from an English family, 4-b. Asteroid was described as being a bay, standing 15.2 hands (62 inches; 157 cm) with a broad back, short coupling and well-developed hind quarters.

== Racing career ==
In 1864 Confederate raiders stormed Woodburn Farm and Asteroid was stolen, but returned to his owner by a neighbour, after he saw the contingent pass and bargained for the horse's release. The following February, 15 of Alexander's horses were taken by soldiers, including two of Alexander's best trotting sires and a younger brother to Asteroid, Norwich. After this invasion, Alexander moved his horses, including the stallions Lexington and Australian, from Woodburn to Illinois, where they stayed until the end of the war, in April 1865.

Asteroid was undefeated in his 12 starts on the racecourse, having won at distances ranging from one to four miles (1.6 to 6.4 kilometers), including two walk-overs. Two $20,000 winner take-all match races were arranged between Asteroid and Kentucky with both horse owners being confident of a victory. The match races were to have taken place in New York and Louisville. Asteroid unfortunately bowed a tendon after working on the track and was retired before the match races were run.

== Stud record ==
Asteroid retired to stand at Woodburn and sired quite a few horses including, Ada A. (br f 1869), Arnica (br f 1868), Lerna (br f 1868) and Nellie Grim (ch f 1870), but nothing of great note. He died in November 1886.

== Sire line tree ==
- Asteroid
  - George Wilkes
  - Harvey Villain
  - Aerolite
  - Artist
  - Asteroid
  - Astral
  - Ballinkeel
    - Blarney
  - Ceylon
  - Creedmore

== See also ==
- List of leading Thoroughbred racehorses
