= Kentucky Stakes =

- Class: Discontinued stakes
- Location: Saratoga Race Course; Saratoga Springs, New York, United States
- Inaugurated: 1870
- Race type: Thoroughbred - Flat racing

Race information
- Distance: 5.5 furlongs
- Surface: Dirt
- Track: left-handed

The Kentucky Stakes was a Thoroughbred horse race run between 1870 and 1938 at Saratoga Race Course in Saratoga Springs, New York. Raced on dirt, it was originally open to two-year-olds of either sex but after the event was placed on hiatus following the 1894 running it was revived in 1901 as a selling race for two-year-old fillies.

== Historical notes ==
The inaugural running of the Kentucky Stakes was contested at 6 furlongs and was won by Harry Bassett, a three-time Champion and future U.S. Racing Hall of Fame inductee. The early races for colts and fillies produced two more Hall of Fame winners, Parole in 1875 and Emperor of Norfolk in 1887.

The final running of the Kentucky Stakes took place on August 15, 1932, and was won by Alfred G. Vanderbilt Jr.'s Spot News.

== Winners ==
Year	Winner
1938	Spot News
1937	Watchcase
1936	Sunset Girl
1935	Fair Stein
1934	Little Lie
1933	Jabot
1932	Eva B
1931	Princess Camelia
1930	Gosling
1929	Shady Lady
1928	Nella R
1927	Torpointer
1926	Ennui
1925	Lacewood
1924	Wax Lady
1923	Sunayr
1922	Pandowdy
1921	Budana
1920	Loveliness
1919	His Choice
1918	Knot
1917	Stitch In Time
1916	Katenka
1915	Bonnie Tess
1914	Montrosa
1913	Crossbun
1912	No races due to Hart–Agnew Law.
1911	No races due to Hart–Agnew Law.
1910	Leah
1909	Responsful
1908	Helen Harvey
1907	Ella O'Neill
1906	Clara Huron
1905	Bauble
1904	Candida
1903	The Lady Rohesia
1902	Lady Albercraft
1901	Mary Worth
1895	1900 Race not held
1894	Handspun
1893	Miss Lilly
1892	Marguerite
1891	Frank Kinney
1890	Cleopatra
1889	Santiago
1888	The Lioness
1887	Emperor of Norfolk
1886	King Fox
1885	Quito
1884	Lizzie Dwyer
1883	Welcher
1882	George Kinney
1881	Onondaga
1880	Brambaletta
1879	Oden
1878	Uncas
1877	Pride of the Village
1876	Susquehanna
1875	Parole
1874	Chesapeake
1873	Battle Axe
1872	Silk Stocking
1871	Sue Ryder
1870	Harry Bassett
