= Mumtaz Mahal (horse) =

British-bred Thoroughbred racehorse

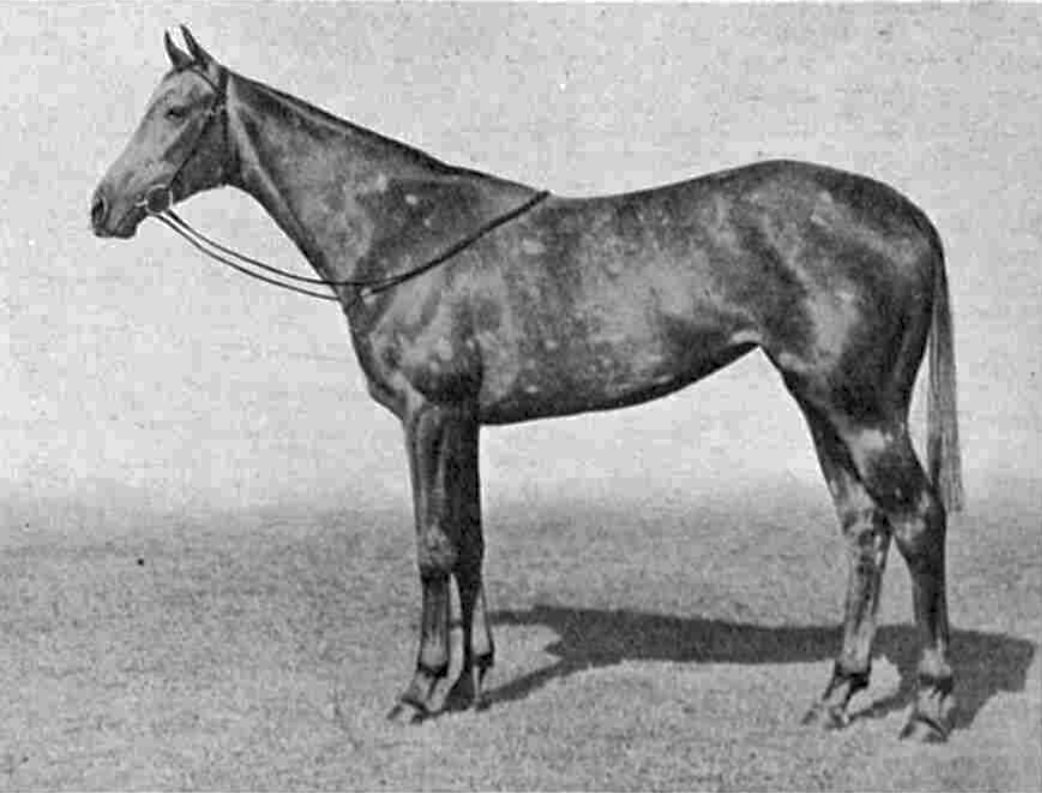
- Mumtaz Mahal in 1924.
- Sire: The Tetrarch
- Grandsire: Roi Herode
- Dam: Lady Josephine
- Damsire: Sundridge
- Sex: Filly
- Foaled: 1921; Driffield, England
- Died: February 1945 (aged 23–24); Marly-la-Ville, France
- Country: Great Britain
- Colour: Grey
- Breeder: Lady Sykes of Sledmere
- Owner: Aga Khan III
- Trainer: Richard C. Dawson
- Record: 10: 7–2–0
- Earnings: £13,933

Major wins
- Spring Stakes (1923); Queen Mary Stakes (1923); National Breeders Produce Stakes (1923); Molecomb Stakes (1923); Champagne Stakes (1923); King George Stakes (1924); Nunthorpe Stakes (1924)
- Last updated on February 18, 2011

Mumtaz Mahal (1921 – 1945) was a British Thoroughbred racehorse who was champion two-year-old, champion sprinter, Horse of the Year and a highly successful broodmare.

She was ranked 71st in Britain and Ireland's Top 100 Racehorses of All-Time in 2013 and was referred to by the National Horseracing Museum as "just about the best two-year-old filly seen in the 20th century" and by the National Sporting Library's Thoroughbred Heritage website as "one of the most important broodmares of the 20th Century".

== Background ==
Known as "Mumpty", she was a blotchy grey mare, named after empress Mumtaz Mahal, wife of Mughal Empire ruler Shah Jahan of Taj Mahal fame. Bred by Lady Sykes at her Sledmere Stud in Driffield, East Riding of Yorkshire, Mumtaz Mahal was out of the mare Lady Josephine. Her sire was The Tetrarch, whom the Thoroughbred Heritage website also said was "probably the greatest two-year-old of all time", and that he was "possibly the greatest runner ever."

== Racing career ==
Prepared by trainer Richard Dawson at Whatcombe Stables in Wantage, Oxfordshire, at age two all of Mumtaz Mahal's races were at distances of either five or six furlongs. Quickly dubbed "The Flying Filly" because of her blazing speed, she set a new track record in the Spring Stakes at Newmarket Racecourse as part of her five important wins in 1923. In her last race that year, she finished second in the Imperial Produce Stakes at Kempton Park Racecourse on a track heavy with mud while conceding 7lbs to the winner. At three Mumtaz Mahal finished second in her first distance test, the 1924 1,000 Guineas, and was fifth in the Coronation Stakes. Her handlers then entered her only in sprint races; she won the six-furlong King George Stakes in which jockey George Archibald "toyed with the opposition" and the five-furlong Nunthorpe Stakes in which he let her stride out to win by six lengths.

== Breeding record ==
She was bought by the Aga Khan III for 9,100 guineas, the highest fee paid for a filly at auction since Sceptre. Retired to breeding duties at his Sheshoon Stud at the Curragh in County Kildare, Ireland, Mumtaz Mahal became an important broodmare. Mumtaz Mahal's best racing son was Mirza II; he (like her) raced his best at distances of six furlongs or less but his trainer, Frank Butters, said he was the fastest horse he had ever conditioned.

Mumtaz Mahal's daughter Mumtaz Begum was bred to Nearco to produce Nasrullah, the sire of Bold Ruler who in turn sired Secretariat. Among Mumtaz Mahal's other descendants are Royal Charger, Petite Etoile, Abernant, and Shergar.

After foaling four foals in England (including Mah Mahal), Mumtaz Mahal was sent to the Aga Khan's Haras Marly-la-Ville stud farm in Marly-la-Ville, Val-d'Oise, France. There she had five more foals, including Mumtaz Begum and Mirza II. She died there in 1945 at the age of 24.

== Pedigree ==
Pedigree of Mumtaz Mahal (GB), grey mare, 1921
Sire The Tetrarch (IRE) 1911	Roi Herode (FR); 1904	Le Samaritain	Le Sancy
Sire The Tetrarch (IRE) 1911	Roi Herode (FR); 1904	Le Samaritain	Clementina
Sire The Tetrarch (IRE) 1911	Roi Herode (FR); 1904	Roxelane	War Dance
Sire The Tetrarch (IRE) 1911	Roi Herode (FR); 1904	Roxelane	Rose of York
Sire The Tetrarch (IRE) 1911	Vahren (GB); 1897	Bona Vista	Bend Or
Sire The Tetrarch (IRE) 1911	Vahren (GB); 1897	Bona Vista	Vista
Sire The Tetrarch (IRE) 1911	Vahren (GB); 1897	Castania	Hagioscope
Sire The Tetrarch (IRE) 1911	Vahren (GB); 1897	Castania	Rose Garden
Dam Lady Josephine (GB) 1912	Sundridge (GB); 1898	Amphion	Rosebery
Dam Lady Josephine (GB) 1912	Sundridge (GB); 1898	Amphion	Suicide
Dam Lady Josephine (GB) 1912	Sundridge (GB); 1898	Sierra	Springfield
Dam Lady Josephine (GB) 1912	Sundridge (GB); 1898	Sierra	Sanda
Dam Lady Josephine (GB) 1912	Americus Girl (IRE); 1906	Americus	Emperor of Norfolk
Dam Lady Josephine (GB) 1912	Americus Girl (IRE); 1906	Americus	Clara D
Dam Lady Josephine (GB) 1912	Americus Girl (IRE); 1906	Palotta	Gallinule
Dam Lady Josephine (GB) 1912	Americus Girl (IRE); 1906	Palotta	Maid of Kilcreene (Family: 9-c)

== See also ==
- Aga Khan III
- Richard C. Dawson
- The Tetrarch

== Bibliography ==
- Oakley, Robin (2013). Britain and Ireland's Top 100 Racehorses of All Time. Corinthian Books. ISBN 978-190685-052-4.
