= Grand National Handicap =

- Class: Discontinued
- Location: Jerome Park Racetrack; Fordham, New York, United States
- Inaugurated: 1866
- Race type: Thoroughbred - Flat racing

Race information
- Distance: 1 1/2 miles
- Surface: Dirt
- Track: left-handed
- Qualification: Three-years-old & up
- Weight: Assigned

The Grand National Handicap was an American Thoroughbred race horse first run in 1866 at the newly built Jerome Park Racetrack in Fordham, New York. Open to horses age three and older, the race was contested on dirt at a distance of 2 1/4 miles from inception through 1884. In the late 1880s, there was a growing shortage of handicap horses and track officials shortened the race in an attempt to draw more entrants. In 1885 it was run at 1 3/4 miles, and for its final four years from 1886 through 1889 at 1 1/2 miles.

Because Jerome Park Racetrack had a number of viability problems and did not reopen in 1890, the last time the Grand National Handicap was run was in 1889.

In winning the final two editions of the Grand National Handicap in 1888 and 1889, Raceland defeated the future U.S. Racing Hall of Fame filly, Firenze.

== Winners ==
Year	Winner	Age	Jockey	Trainer	style=Owner	Dist. (Miles)	Time
1889	Raceland	4		Frank McCabe	Michael F. Dwyer	11/2 m	2:39.25
1888	Raceland	3		Frank McCabe	Michael F. Dwyer	11/2 m	2:39.75
1887	Linden	4				11/2 m	2:42.75
1886	Wickham	4				11/2 m	2:40.00
1885	Bob M	4				13/4 m	3:12.00
1884	Drake Carter	4				21/4 m	4:11.50
1883	George Kinney	3				21/4 m	4:11.00
1882	Girofle	5				21/4 m	4:11.00
1881	Monitor	5				21/4 m	4:07.75
1880	Uncas	4				21/4 m	4:05.25
1879	General Philips	5				21/4 m	4:07.50
1878	Lou Lanier	3	Harry Blaylock			21/4 m	4:06.75
1877	Tom Ochiltree	5				21/4 m	4:18.50
1876	Vigil	3		David McDaniel	David McDaniel	21/4 m	4:11.00
1875	Aaron Pennington	4				21/4 m	4:15.75
1874	Mate	5				21/4 m	4:13.75
1873	Preakness	6				21/4 m	4:08.75
1872	Tubman	4				21/4 m	4:10.75
1871	Monarchist	3				21/4 m	4:09.00
1870	Niagara	4				21/4 m	4:09.25
1869	La Polka	4				21/4 m	4:18.25
1868	De Courcey	4				21/4 m	4:11.50
1867	Local	4				23/4 m	5:09.00
1866	Kentucky	5		A. Jackson Minor	Annieswood Stable (Belmont/Hunter/Jerome/Cameron/Travers)	23/4 m	5:04.00
