= Kentucky (horse) =

American-bred Thoroughbred racehorse

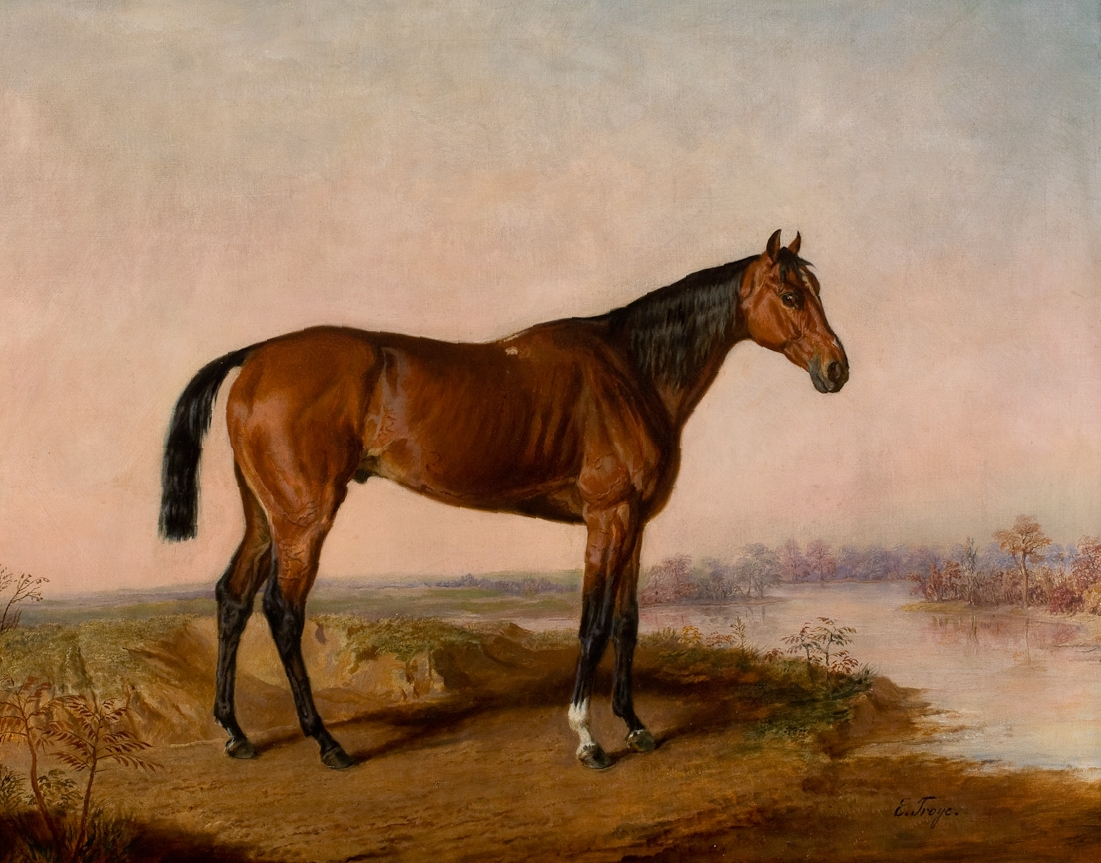
- Sire: Lexington
- Grandsire: Boston
- Dam: Magnolia
- Damsire: Glencoe
- Sex: Stallion
- Foaled: 1861
- Country: United States
- Color: Bay
- Breeder: John M. Clay
- Owner: John Hunter William R. Travers; George Osgood; Leonard Jerome; Annieswood Stable August Belmont
- Trainer: A. Jackson Minor
- Record: 23 Starts: 21 – 0 - 0
- Earnings: $33,700

Major wins
- Travers Stakes (1864); Saratoga Cup (1864, 1865); Inaugural Stakes; Sequel Stakes (1864); Grand National Handicap (1866)

Honors
- United States Racing Hall of Fame (1983)
- Last updated on February 18, 2011

Kentucky (1861–1875), was a successful American Thoroughbred racehorse who won 21 of his 23 starts, including 20 consecutive wins.

== Background ==
Kentucky was sired by Lexington, who sired three colts in 1861 (out of Glencoe mares) and each of whom become one of the best race horses in America – Norfolk, Asteroid and Kentucky. Norfolk and Asteroid went undefeated throughout their racing careers, and one of the few horses who ever defeated Kentucky was Norfolk. Kentucky's dam was Magnolia, by the imported British champion Glencoe; Glencoe stood at John Harper's Nantura Stock Farm in Kentucky. His sire line traced back to Herod.

A rangy bay with a narrow white stripe and white off-fore pastern, Kentucky was owned by John Hunter, one of the founders of the Saratoga Race Course and co-owner (and the first chairman) of The Jockey Club.

== Racing record ==
Probably trained by A. Jackson Minor (the facts are unclear), Kentucky won his only two-year-old start. At age three, racing for John Hunter, William R. Travers and George Osgood, he lost his second start in the inaugural Jersey Derby – coming in fourth to Norfolk. After that he won 20 consecutive races, including the first Travers Stakes in 1864 and the first two runnings of the Saratoga Cup at a distance of 2¼ miles. He also won the first Inaugural Stakes in four mile heats at the newly opened Jerome Park Racetrack. For three seasons (1864, 1865 and 1866), when races were two, three and four miles long, he was the undisputed champion of East Coast racing.

In 1866 he was sold for the then-enormous sum of $40,000 to Leonard Jerome, after whom the Jerome Handicap is named. Kentucky was then resold to Annieswood Stable (a partnership of August Belmont, John Hunter, Leonard Jerome, Roderick Cameron, and William Travers). He was again sold at auction in October 1868, and Belmont bought him outright for $15,000.

Two match races were arranged by Joseph Kleb between Asteroid (the top horse in Kentucky) and Kentucky (the best horse in New York). Both owners were confident of winning the two matches – one in New York and one in Louisville for $20,000 winner-take-all. Unfortunately, Asteroid pulled a tendon during training and was retired before the match races were held.

He lost his only start at age six in 1867, the second loss of his entire career.

== At stud ==
In 1869 Belmont sent Kentucky to stand at his Babylon, New York Nursery Stud, where he sired the champion filly Woodbine (1869). He also produced the stakes winners Bertram (colt 1873), Elastic (filly 1871), Beatrice, Medora and Dublin.

He died at Nursery Stud in April 1875 – the same year his sire Lexington (the "Blind Hero of Woodburn") died. Kentucky was inducted into the National Museum of Racing and Hall of Fame in 1983.

== Sire line tree ==
- Kentucky
  - Silk Stocking
  - Scratch
  - Bertram

== See also ==
- Asteroid (horse)
- Lexington (horse)
- List of leading Thoroughbred racehorses
