= Old Winters Ranch/Winters Mansion =

- U.S. National Register of Historic Places
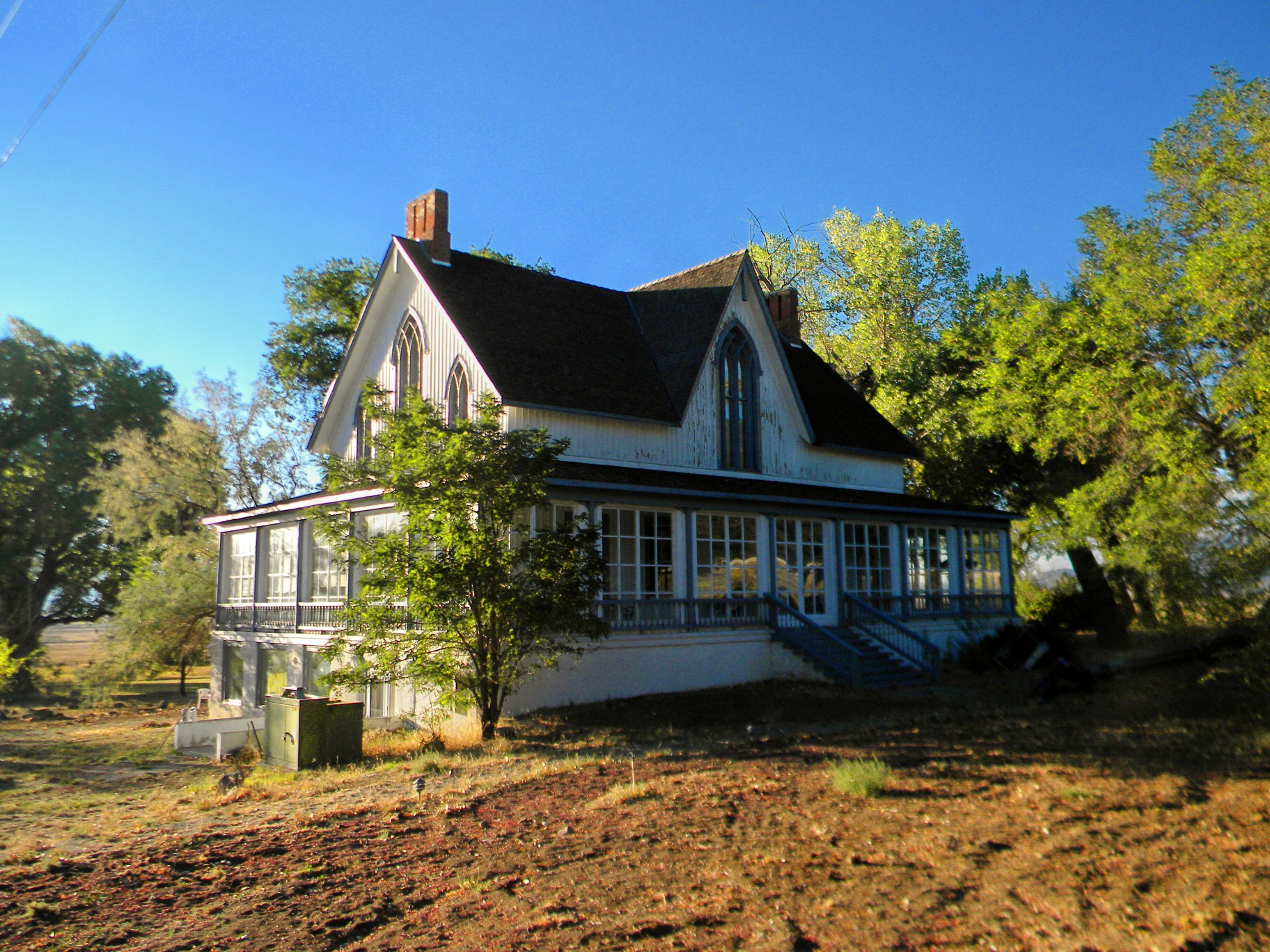

- Location within Nevada Location within the United States
- Location: North of Carson City
- Nearest city: Carson City, Nevada
- Coordinates: 39°18′43″N 119°49′18″W
- Area: 9 acres (3.6 ha)
- Built: 1862
- Built by: Steele, Mr.
- Architectural style: Gothic Revival, Carpenter's Gothic
- NRHP reference No.: 74001150
- Added to NRHP: July 30, 1974

The Old Winters Ranch/Winters Mansion, near Carson City, Nevada, was completed in 1864. Also known as Rancho del Sierra, it was listed on the National Register of Historic Places in 1974. It was argued to be significant for its historical associations, for its architecture, and for its "continuing educational possibilities."

It is located in what is now known as old Washoe City.
