= Emperor of Norfolk =

American Thoroughbred racehorse

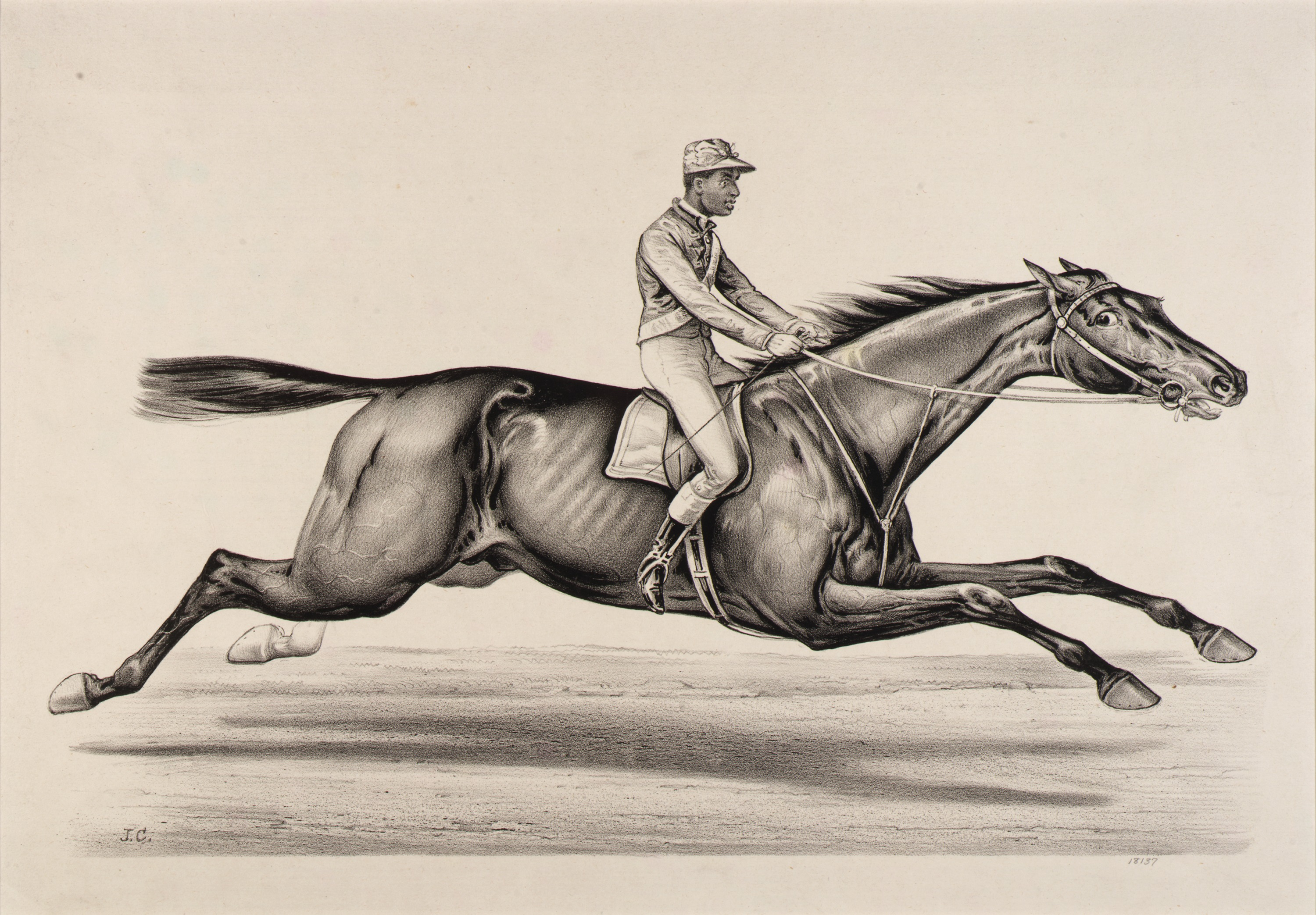
- 1888 lithograph
- Sire: Norfolk
- Grandsire: Lexington
- Dam: Marian
- Damsire: Malcolm
- Sex: Stallion
- Foaled: 1885
- Country: United States
- Colour: Bay
- Breeder: Theodore Winters
- Owner: Lucky Baldwin
- Trainer: John W. McClelland; Robert W. Thomas
- Record: 29: 21-2–4
- Earnings: $79,290

Major wins
- Algeria Stakes (1887); Hyde Park Stakes (1887); Kentucky Stakes (1887); Kenwood Stakes (1887); Saratoga Stakes (1887); American Derby (1888); Bronx Stakes (1888); Brooklyn Derby (1888); Drexel Stakes (1888); Sheridan Stakes (1888); Swift Stakes (1888)

Awards
- American Co-Champion 2-Year-Old Colt (1887); American Co-Champion 3-Year-Old Colt (1888)

Honours
- United States Racing Hall of Fame (1988)
- Last updated on December 9, 2022

Emperor of Norfolk (1885–1907) was an American Champion and Hall of Fame Thoroughbred racehorse. His large size, strong hindquarters, and racing record earned him the name of the "California Wonder".

== Background ==
In the 1870s, when Joseph Cairn Simpson (founder of California's first all-sports newspaper, Breeder and Sportsman) migrated west, he brought horses with him. One was the filly Marian. To finance his newspaper, he sold Marian to Theodore Winters, who owned California's best stallion, Norfolk, by one of America's greatest sires, Lexington. Norfolk retired undefeated. Winters bought him for $15,001, one dollar more than the amount paid for Lexington himself.

With the purchase of Marian, Winters now owned a top stallion and a top broodmare. Marian, mated to Norfolk, both living at either Winters' second stud farm, the Rancho Del Rio near Sacramento on the banks of the Sacramento River or on his Yolo County, California, spread, produced numerous outstanding runners: Duchess of Norfolk, Prince of Norfolk, The Czar, El Rio Rey, Rey Del Rey, and Emperor of Norfolk. After Norfolk retired, Marian produced another star horse: Yo Tambien, by turf champion Joe Hooker.

== Racing career ==
Winters sold Marian's yearling foal to Elias Jackson Baldwin for $2,525. Baldwin raced the colt 18 times at the age of two, which was a normal schedule for the time. During one eight-day span, Emperor of Norfolk won three races in Chicago, Illinois. At Saratoga, New York, in August, he won four more races. Then he went to Jerome Park Racetrack, where he took two races in four days. He also placed in the Prospect Cap and came third in the Quickstep Stakes.

At three, Emperor of Norfolk started eleven times, winning 9 races, 8 of them consecutively. He placed in one race and showed in another. Of the nine starts he won, two were the prestigious Brooklyn Stakes (now called the Dwyer Stakes) and the American Derby under the great African American jockey Isaac Burns Murphy.

Emperor of Norfolk won at distances of between five and nine furlongs, and earned, for the time, a huge sum of money.

He retired lame after his last win in the Sheridan Stakes (the injury occurring during an exercise run), and Baldwin shipped him back to Rancho Santa Anita to begin his stud career.

== At stud ==
Emperor of Norfolk was great a sire as his own sire, Norfolk, producing stake winner after stake winner, but his best son (who possessed a variety of names until sent to England) was Americus. Americus won many stakes races, but was best known as a sire, primarily through his daughter Americus Girl. Out of Americus Girl came the "flying filly," Mumtaz Mahal, and through her Mahmoud, Nasrullah, Royal Charger, and Tudor Minstrel.

Many of today's most successful horses go back to Emperor of Norfolk through Mumtaz Mahal via Americus.

== Death ==
Emperor of Norfolk died at age 22 on December 15, 1907. He was buried at the stable under a large Maltese cross, Baldwin's racing symbol. Later, Baldwin's three other American Derby winners, Volante, Silver Cloud, and Rey El Santa Anita, were also buried there. All four horses were later transferred to the paddock garden of the modern Santa Anita Park.

Emperor of Norfolk was inducted into the Hall of Fame in 1988.

== Sire line tree ==
- Emperor of Norfolk
  - Americus
    - Jack Snipe
    - Golden Rod
  - Rey del Carreres
  - Berardello
  - Estaca
  - Norford
  - Cruzados
    - Lantados
      - Rey El Rio
        - Rey El Tierra
          - El Tesoro
            - Peerless
              - Conquering Elk*
  - Americano
  - Norito

* Conquering Elk (b. 1987) is the last known male progeny of the Lexington sire line in the United States. Consequently, as a result, the Byerley Turk male sire line became extinct in the United States, although it still survives in Europe.

== Pedigree ==
Pedigree of Emperor of Norfolk, bay colt, 1885
| Sire Norfolk | Lexington | Boston | Timoleon |
| Sire Norfolk | Lexington | Boston | Sister to Tuckahoe |
| Sire Norfolk | Lexington | Alice Carneal | Sarpedon |
| Sire Norfolk | Lexington | Alice Carneal | Rowena |
| Sire Norfolk | Novice | Glencoe | Sultan |
| Sire Norfolk | Novice | Glencoe | Trampoline |
| Sire Norfolk | Novice | Chloe Anderson | Rodolph |
| Sire Norfolk | Novice | Chloe Anderson | Belle Anderson |
| Dam Marian | Malcolm | Bonnie Scotland | Iago |
| Dam Marian | Malcolm | Bonnie Scotland | Queen Mary |
| Dam Marian | Malcolm | Lady Lancaster | Monarch |
| Dam Marian | Malcolm | Lady Lancaster | Lady Canton |
| Dam Marian | Maggie Mitchell | Yorkshire | St Nicholas |
| Dam Marian | Maggie Mitchell | Yorkshire | Miss Rose |
| Dam Marian | Maggie Mitchell | Charmer | Glencoe |
| Dam Marian | Maggie Mitchell | Charmer | Betsey Malone (family: A17) |
