= Lexington (horse) =

American Thoroughbred horse (1850–1875)

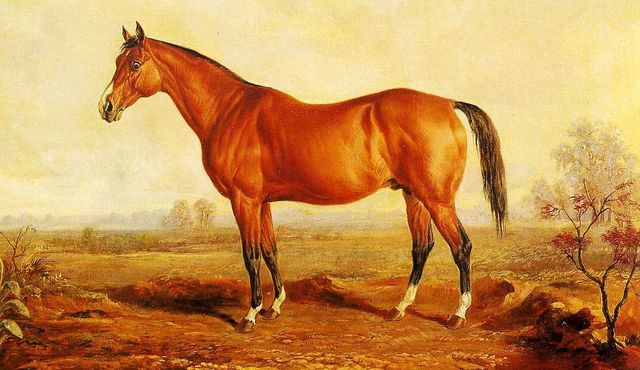
- Lexington, by Edward Troye
- Sire: Boston
- Grandsire: Timoleon
- Dam: Alice Carneal
- Damsire: Sarpedon
- Sex: Stallion
- Foaled: 17 March 1850
- Country: United States
- Colour: Bay
- Breeder: Warfield
- Owner: Syndicate of Richard Li Ten Broeck, General Abe Buford, Captain Willa Viley & Junius R. Ward; 2. Robert A. Alexander
- Trainer: J. B. Pryor
- Record: 7: 6 wins, 1 second
- Earnings: $56,600

Major wins
- Phoenix Hotel Handicap

Awards
- Leading sire in North America (1861-1874, 1876, 1878)

Honors
- United States Racing Hall of Fame inductee (1955); Fair Grounds Racing Hall of Fame (1971)

Lexington (March 17, 1850 – July 1, 1875) was a United States Thoroughbred race horse who won six of his seven race starts. Perhaps his greatest fame, however, came as the most successful sire of the second half of the nineteenth century; he was the leading sire in North America 16 times, and broodmare sire of many notable racehorses.

== Background ==
Lexington was a bay horse with irregular white markings on his face and four white socks on his legs. 15.3 hands (63 inches, 160 cm) and was described as having good conformation though he had a distinctive convex profile, described as a "moose head." At stud, he developed a willful and somewhat vicious temperament. He was bred by Elisha Warfield at Warfield's stud farm, The Meadows, near Lexington, Kentucky. Lexington was sired by the Hall of Fame stallion, Boston.

== Racing record ==
Under the name of "Darley" Lexington easily won his first two races for Warfield and his partner, "Burbridge's Harry", a.k.a. Harry Lewis, a former slave turned well-known horse trainer. Lewis, being black, was not allowed to enter "Darley" in races in his own name, so the horse ran in Warfield's name and colors. Darley caught the eye of Richard Ten Broeck who asked Warfield to name his price. "Darley", the son of Boston, and Jarret, Lewis's son who was still enslaved, were sold in 1853 to Ten Broeck acting on behalf of a syndicate who would rename him Lexington. Affixed to Lexington's pedigree Warfield wrote: "The colt was bred by me, as was also his dam, which I now and will ever, own...E. Warfield."

A syndicate made up of Richard Ten Broeck, General Abe Buford, Captain Willa Viley, and Junius R. Ward, bought Lexington for $2,500 between heats (or during the running of his race), so tried claiming the purse money when he won. Failing that, he tried to deduct the purse money from the sale price. But Warfield held out. His new owners immediately sent Lexington to Natchez, Mississippi, to train under J. B. Pryor.

Lexington raced at age three and four and although he only competed seven times, many of his races were grueling four-mile events. Lexington won six of his seven races and finished second once. One of his wins was the Phoenix Hotel Handicap in 1853. On April 2, 1855, at the Metairie race course in New Orleans, he set a record running 4 miles (6.4 km) in 7 minutes, 19 3/4 seconds, running against time. Even with his complex and hard-fought rivalry with the horse Lecomte (also a son of Boston, both born just after Boston died), he was known as the best race horse of his day. His second match with Lecomte on April 14, 1855, was considered one of the greatest matches of the century. But Lexington had to be retired at the end of 1855 as a result of poor eyesight. His sire, Boston, had also gone blind. Conservation work in 2010 revealed that Lexington had had a massive facial infection that resulted in his going blind.

== Stud record ==
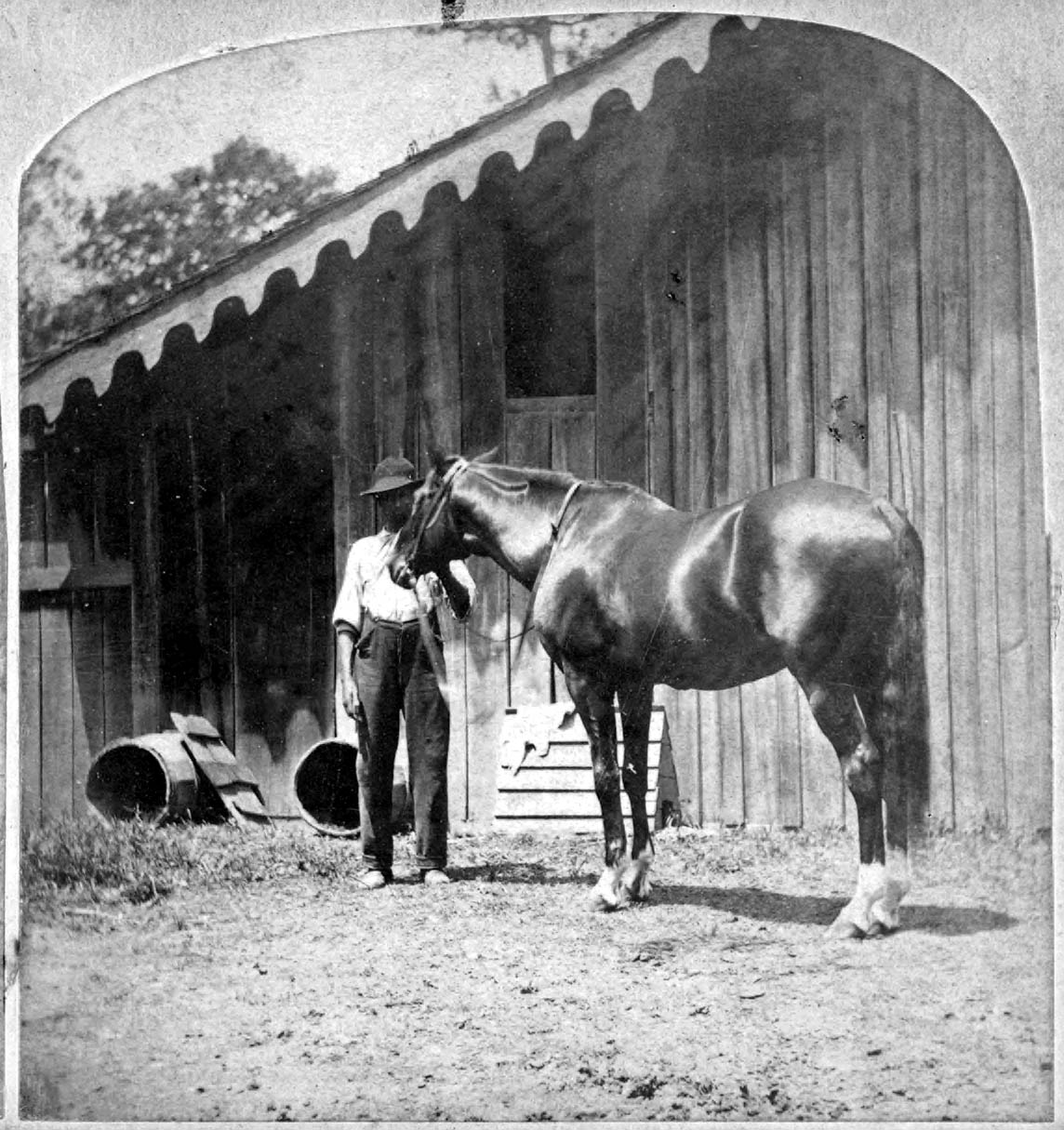
One of the few known photographs of Lexington

Lexington stood for a time at the Nantura Stock Farm of Uncle John Harper in Midway, Kentucky, along with the famous racer and sire, Glencoe. Sold to Robert A. Alexander for $15,000 in 1858, reportedly the then highest price ever paid for an American horse, Lexington was sent to Alexander's Woodburn Stud at Spring Station, Kentucky.

He stood for a price of $100 until 1861, when he first led the sire list, and it was increased to $200. He stood for a limited public fee of $500, the highest in the country and comparable to the leading English stallions, in 1865 and 1866 before being restricted to private stud duties only.

Called "The Blind Hero of Woodburn", Lexington became the leading sire in North America sixteen times, from 1861 through 1874, and then again in 1876 and 1878. Lexington was the sire of the undefeated Asteroid and Norfolk. Nine of the first fifteen Travers Stakes were won by one of his sons or daughters. Among his noted progeny are:

Foaled	Name	Sex	Major Wins/Achievements
1857	Idlewild	Mare	Notable racer
1860	Cincinnati	Stallion	General Ulysses S. Grant's favorite horse. He was depicted in numerous statues of Grant that remain to this day.
1861	Asteroid	Stallion	Undefeated
1861	Kentucky	Stallion	Travers Stakes (1864), US Racing Hall of Fame inductee
1861	Norfolk	Stallion	Undefeated, Jersey Derby (1864)
1864	Hira	Mare	Dam of Himyar
1865	General Duke	Stallion	Belmont Stakes (1868), American Champion Two-Year-Old Colt
1867	Kingfisher	Stallion	Belmont Stakes (1870), Travers Stakes (1870)
1867	Preakness	Stallion	Namesake of the Preakness Stakes, Manhattan Stakes (1873), US Racing Hall of Fame inductee
1868	Harry Bassett	Stallion	Belmont Stakes (1871), US Racing Hall of Fame inductee
1868	Monarchist	Stallion	Grand National Handicap (1871),
1870	Tom Bowling	Stallion	Travers Stakes (1873), US Racing Hall of Fame inductee
1872	Tom Ochiltree	Stallion	Preakness Stakes (1875), US Racing Hall of Fame inductee
1873	Neecy Hale	Mare	Kentucky Oaks (1876)
1873	Shirley	Gelding	Preakness Stakes (1876)
1873	Sultana	Mare	Travers Stakes (1876), Retrospective Champion Three-Year-Old Filly (1876)
1875	Belle of Nelson	Mare	Kentucky Oaks (1878)
1875	Duke of Magenta	Stallion	Preakness Stakes (1878), Belmont Stakes (1878), Travers Stakes (1878), US Racing Hall of Fame inductee

Lexington's three Preakness Stakes winners equaled the record of another great sire, Broomstick.

In all Lexington sired 236 winners who won 1,176 races, ran second 348 times and third 42 times for $1,159,321 in prize money.

During the American Civil War, horses were forcibly conscripted from the Kentucky farms to serve as mounts in the bloody fray. Lexington, 15 years old and blind, had to be hidden away to save him from such a fate. He was sent to Illinois for this purpose.

Lexington died at Woodburn on July 1, 1875, and was buried in a casket in front of the stables. A few years later, in 1878, his owner, through the auspices of J.M. Toner, donated the horse's bones to the U.S. National Museum (the Smithsonian Institution). The pioneering taxidermist Henry Augustus Ward of Ward's Natural Science in Rochester, New York, was called in to supervise the disinterment and preparation of the skeleton. For many years the specimen was exhibited in the Osteology Hall of the National Museum of Natural History. In 1999, Lexington was part of the exhibition "On Time", at the National Museum of American History, where he helped illustrate the history of the first mass-produced stopwatch that split time into fractions of seconds—which was supposedly developed to document Lexington's feats on the race course. In 2010, Smithsonian conservators prepared the skeleton for loan to the International Museum of the Horse in Lexington, Kentucky, in time for the World Equestrian Games in Kentucky, the first time these games had been held outside of Europe.

Lexington's dominance in the pedigrees of American-bred Thoroughbreds, and the fact that the British Thoroughbred breeders considered him not a purebred, was a large factor in the so-called Jersey Act of 1913, in which the British Jockey Club limited the registration of horses not traced completely to horses in the General Stud Book.

Summary of Stud Career
Year	Rank in Sire List	Starters	Races won	Money Won
1859	7th	7	10	$6,700
1860	2nd	12	37	$22,295
1861	1st	13	27	$22,245
1862	1st	5	14	$9,700
1863	1st	10	25	$14,235
1864	1st	13	38	$28,440
1865	1st	31	87	$58,750
1866	1st	34	112	$92,795
1867	1st	33	86	$54,030
1868	1st	36	92	$68,340
1869	1st	36	81	$56,375
1870	1st	35	82	$120,360
1871	1st	40	102	$109,095
1872	1st	28	82	$71,515
1873	1st	23	71	$71,565
1874	1st	23	70	$51,899
1875	3rd	30	33	$32,245
1876	1st	21	34	$90,570
1877	2nd	20	29	$32,815
1878	1st	16	36	$60,195
1879	7th	15	19	$17,439.50
1880	17th	9	12	$9,297.50
1881	17th	6	7	$1,055
1882	17th	3	1	$255
Totals		499	1,187	$1,102,211

Lexington did additionally have one foal start in 1858 as a two-year-old, finishing second in a single start.

== Honors ==
Lexington was part of the first group of horses inducted into the National Museum of Racing and Hall of Fame in 1955. The Belmont Lexington Stakes runs every year at Belmont Park in honor of Lexington, as does the Lexington Stakes at Keeneland Race Course.

On August 31, 2010, the Smithsonian loaned Lexington's skeleton to the International Museum of the Horse at the Kentucky Horse Park, to be exhibited there through August 2013.

Lexington served as the model for the top of the Woodlawn Vase, given to the winner of the Preakness Stakes at Pimlico.

Lexington was exhibited at the 1859 Great St. Louis Fair.

== Legacy ==
Lexington was the leading sire in North America a record 16 times. His sire line originally flourished, especially through Norfolk (who in turn produced champions Emperor of Norfolk and El Rio Rey), but then faced increasing competition from European imports. His last known direct male descendant was Conquering Elk (foaled 1987). However, his influence on the pedigrees of the modern Thoroughbred can still be felt through his daughters, who produced winners Spendthrift, Himyar, Hanover, and Bramble. Himyar in turn established a sire line that has survived into the 21st century through Holy Bull, who sired both 2005 Kentucky Derby winner Giacomo and 2000 Breeders' Cup Juvenile winner Mucho Uno. In turn, Mucho Uno sired 2013 Breeders' Cup Classic winner Mucho Macho Man, the sire of 2020 Pegasus World Cup winner Mucho Gusto. Likewise, the Spendthrift line has survived into the 21st century through Tiznow, who won the Breeders Cup Classic in consecutive years (2000, 2001); he in turn produced 2008 Belmont Stakes winner Da' Tara, and 2008 Santa Anita Derby and Travers Stakes winner Colonel John.

Lexington is the subject of the best selling novel Horse by Geraldine Brooks, published in 2022.

== Sire line tree ==
Lexington descendants (click to expand)
- Lexington
  - Daniel Boone
    - Cottrill
  - Goodwood
  - Colton
    - Monday
      - Joe Hooker
        - Bonanza
        - Ichi Ban
        - C H Todd
        - Surinam
        - Don Jose
        - Sorrento
        - Oregon Eclipse
        - Zaldiver
        - Yo El Rey
        - Rey Del Sierras
      - Shannon
        - Bishop
      - California
      - Mark L
      - Argyle
      - Duke of Monday
      - Guardsman
      - Peel
  - Lightning
    - D'Artagnan
  - Optomist
    - Mars
      - Jongleur
      - Promethee
    - Osman
  - Uncle Vic
    - Victory
    - Harry Edwards
    - Uncle Tom
  - Bulletin
  - Jack Malone
    - Chickamauga
    - Muggins
    - Camargo
    - Damon
    - Bazar
  - Lexington (Embry)
  - Thunder
  - Avalanche
  - Censor
  - Frank Boston
  - Harper
    - Bay Jack
  - Jim Sherwood
    - Dan Heaney
  - Lexington (Hunter)
    - Joe Johnson
    - Judge Wickliffe
  - War Dance
    - Ramadan
      - Judge Arnett
    - Wheatly
    - St George
    - Big Fellow
    - Monmouth
    - Stampede
    - Bullion
    - Chance
  - Union Jack
  - Copec
  - Rogers
  - Asteroid
    - George Wilkes
    - Harvey Villain
    - Aerolite
    - Artist
    - Asteroid
    - Astral
    - Ballinkeel
      - Blarney
    - Ceylon
    - Creedmore
  - Beacon
  - Chesapeake
  - Cincinnati
  - Donerail
  - Kentucky
    - Silk Stocking
    - Scratch
    - Bertram
  - Loadstone
  - Norfolk
    - Norfall
    - Bradley
    - Flood
    - Duke of Norfolk
    - Prince of Norfolk
    - Alta
    - Estil
    - Emperor of Norfolk
      - Americus
        - Jack Snipe
        - Golden Rod
      - Rey del Carreres
      - Berardello
      - Estaca
      - Norford
      - Cruzados
        - Lantados
      - Americano
      - Norito
    - The Czar
    - El Rio Rey
      - Scarborough
      - Bonus Res
  - Ulverston
    - Keene Richards
  - Woodburn
    - Hardwood
  - Ansel
  - Bay Dick
  - Gilroy
    - Grinstead
      - Gano
        - Peru
      - Volante
        - Hindus
      - Silver Cloud
      - Clio
      - Santiago
    - John M Clay
  - Harry of the West
  - Luther
    - Sharpcatcher
  - Veto
  - Edinborough
  - Jonesboro
  - King Lear
  - Lee Paul
  - Lever
    - Leveller
    - Apollo
  - Merrill
  - Norway
  - Red Dick
  - Watson
  - Baywood
  - Concord
    - Galway
  - King Tom
    - King George
  - Marion
    - Logan
  - Newry
  - Bayonet
  - Crossland
  - General Duke
    - Bonnie Duke
  - Hazard
  - Paris
  - Pat Malloy
    - Ozark
    - Lord Murphy
    - Blue Grass
    - Bob Miles
      - Manuel
    - Favor
  - Vauxhall
    - Viator
    - Cloverbrook
  - Barney Willams
  - Chillecothe
  - Foster
    - Jim Brown
  - Kingfisher
    - Turco
    - King Crab
    - Prince Royal
      - Yankee Doodle
      - The Mighty
    - King Cadmus
  - Pilgrim
  - Preakness
    - Fiddler
      - Jummy
  - Creole Dance
  - Harry Bassett
    - George McCullough
    - King Nero
  - Monarchist
    - Longfield
    - Storey
      - Fib
    - Monarch
    - Loftin
  - Pimlico
  - Wanderer
  - Tom Bowling
    - Black Prince
    - General Monroe
    - Sligo
    - Tacoma
  - Acrobat
  - Breathitt
    - Melikoff
  - Jack Boston
  - King Bolt
  - Tom Ochiltree
    - Tattler
    - Cynosure
    - Major Domo
    - Sluggard
  - Charley Howard
  - Fiddlesticks
  - Shirley
  - Brown Prince
    - Shillelagh
    - Kilsallaghan
  - Frederick the Great
  - Duke of Magenta
    - Leo
    - Young Duke
    - Duke of Kent
    - Eric
  - Uncas
    - Dunboyne
    - Oneko
    - Sorcerer
    - Fake

== Pedigree ==
Some of the horses in Lexington's pedigree cannot be traced back to England's General Stud Book, a fact that can probably be attributed to the disruptions and sometimes hazardous record keeping in the period between the American Revolution and Civil War. The pedigree shown on The Jockey Club's Equineline database is thus incomplete, not showing the dams of Timoleon, Florizel and the Alderman Mare. The pedigree shown below fills in those gaps based on American records.

Lexington is usually said to descend from family 12-b in the female line through his third dam Lady Grey. However, the mitochondrial DNA of descendants of Lady Grey is inconsistent with that of other members of family 12-b, indicating a likely mismatch.

Pedigree of Lexington, bay stallion, 1850
Sire Boston Chestnut 1833	Timoleon; Chestnut 1814	Sir Archy*; Bay 1805	Diomed*
Sire Boston Chestnut 1833	Timoleon; Chestnut 1814	Sir Archy*; Bay 1805	Castianira
Sire Boston Chestnut 1833	Timoleon; Chestnut 1814	Saltram mare Ch. 1801	Saltram
Sire Boston Chestnut 1833	Timoleon; Chestnut 1814	Saltram mare Ch. 1801	Symme's Wildair Mare
Sire Boston Chestnut 1833	Ball's Florizel Mare; Chestnut 1814	Ball's Florizel	Diomed*
Sire Boston Chestnut 1833	Ball's Florizel Mare; Chestnut 1814	Ball's Florizel	Shark Mare
Sire Boston Chestnut 1833	Ball's Florizel Mare; Chestnut 1814	Alderman Mare; 1799	Alderman
Sire Boston Chestnut 1833	Ball's Florizel Mare; Chestnut 1814	Alderman Mare; 1799	Clockfast Mare
Dam Alice Carneal Bay 1836	Sarpedon; Bay 1828	Emilius	Orville
Dam Alice Carneal Bay 1836	Sarpedon; Bay 1828	Emilius	Emily
Dam Alice Carneal Bay 1836	Sarpedon; Bay 1828	Icaria	The Flyer
Dam Alice Carneal Bay 1836	Sarpedon; Bay 1828	Icaria	Parma
Dam Alice Carneal Bay 1836	Rowena; Chestnut 1826	Sumpter	Sir Archy*^
Dam Alice Carneal Bay 1836	Rowena; Chestnut 1826	Sumpter	Robin Redbreast Mare
Dam Alice Carneal Bay 1836	Rowena; Chestnut 1826	Lady Grey	Robin Grey
Dam Alice Carneal Bay 1836	Rowena; Chestnut 1826	Lady Grey	Maria (family: 12-b)

* Lexington is inbred 3S x 4D to the stallion Sir Archy, meaning that he appears in the third generation on the sire side of his pedigree and fourth generation on the dam side of his pedigree.

*^ Lexington is inbred 4S x 4S x 5D to the stallion Diomed, meaning that he appears in the fourth generation twice on the sire side of his pedigree and fifth generation once (through Sir Archy)^ on the dam side of his pedigree.

== In popular culture ==
The oil painting Portrait of Lexington by artist Thomas J. Scott (c. 1857) appears in Ghosts (US) Season 1, Episode 16, "Trevor's Pants". The original painting is housed at the Smithsonian American Art Museum (SAAM), and was a gift of Mr. and Mrs. David K. Anderson to the Martha Jackson Memorial Collection in 1980.

A semi-fictionalized account of Lexington's life as a racehorse and stud, as well as the history of Scott's Portrait of Lexington, are told in Pulitzer Prize-winner Geraldine Brooks' 2022 novel Horse.

== See also ==
- List of racehorses
- List of leading Thoroughbred racehorses
- Horsemanship of Ulysses S. Grant—Lexington's off spring, Cincinnati, is featured here.
