= Astarita Stakes =

Horse race in New York, United States

- Class: Discontinued stakes
- Location: Aqueduct Racetrack, South Ozone Park, Queens, New York, United States; Belmont Park; Elmont, New York, United States
- Inaugurated: 1946–2005
- Race type: Thoroughbred – Flat racing

Race information
- Distance: 6.5 furlongs
- Surface: Dirt
- Track: left-handed
- Qualification: Two-year-old fillies
- Purse: $100,000

The Astarita Stakes was an American Thoroughbred horse race run between 1946 and 2005 at New York's Aqueduct Racetrack in South Ozone Park, Queens and at Belmont Park in Elmont. Open to two-year-old fillies, it was a sprint race contested on dirt over a distance of six and a half furlongs. It offered a purse of $100,000.

The Astarita was given Grade III stakes status in 1973 when a grading system was instituted at all racetracks in North America. In 1981 it was elevated to a Grade II event before being downgraded in 2004 to its original Grade III which was maintained until the race was dropped from the schedule in 2006.

In 1955 the Greater New York Association took over management of Belmont Park, Aqueduct Racetrack, Jamaica Race Course and the Saratoga Race Course. Massive renovations led to the subsequent closure of Aqueduct Racetrack for four years and there was no Astarita Stakes run for the three years between 1958 and 1960.

The race was named for Astarita, John Follansbee's filly who won the 1902 inaugural running of the Astoria Stakes at the now defunct Gravesend Race Track on Coney Island, New York City. The Astarita Stakes was run at:

- Aqueduct Racetrack: 1946–1955, 1962–1966, 1993–1994, 1997
- Belmont Park: 1956–1957, 1961

It was contested at various distances:

- 6 furlongs : 1946–1956
- 6.5 furlongs : 1972–1994, 1997–2005
- 7 furlongs : 1957–1971, 1996
- 8 furlongs : 1995

The Astarita was run in two divisions in 1965, 1968 and 1972.

== Historical notes ==
The first running of the Astarita Stakes took place at Aqueduct on September 21, 1946. It was won by Keynote, a strawberry roan filly owned by the Wheatley Stable and ridden by future Canadian Horse Racing Hall of Fame inductee Hedley Woodhouse.

USN Rear-Admiral Howard Adams Flanigan won the 1954 running of the Astarita with his good filly Two Stars. On the same racecard, future U. S. Racing Hall of Fame jockey Ted Atkinson reached a milestone in his career with his 3,000th win aboard the Greentree Stable colt Devastation.

In 1955 Cosmah captured the Astarita Stakes and in 1963 her daughter Tosmah, a future U.S. Racing Hall of Fame inductee, also won it.

The 1961 edition was won by Cicada, Christopher Chenery's three-time National Champion and U.S. Racing Hall of Fame inductee.

In 1964 Queen Empress won by a nose but was disqualified to second for interference giving the win to runner-up I Deceive.

In 2000 Xtra Heat’s win extended her career unbeaten streak to six. She would be voted the 2001 American Champion Three-Year-Old Filly and in 2015 would be inducted into the U.S. Racing Hall of Fame.

The final running of the Astarita Stakes took place on October 2, 2005. It was won by Sensation with Eibar Coa aboard for owner Gary and Betty Biszantz's Cobra Farm and their partner, the Castletop Stable owned by Morton and Bobbi Topfer.

== Records ==
Speed record:

- 110.00 @ 6 furlongs – Alanesian (1956)
- 1:16.40 @ 6.5 furlongs – Stulcer (1974)
- 1:22.60 @ 7 furlongs – Syrian Sea (1967)

Most wins by a jockey:

- 4 – Ron Turcotte (1965, 1968, 1970, 1973)

Most wins by a trainer:

- 2 – Casey Hayes (1961, 1967)
- 2 – Charles P. Sanborn (1964, 1982)
- 2 – Del W. Carroll (1970, 1980)
- 2 – James A. Jerkens (1997, 1999)

Most wins by an owner:

- 2 – Wheatley Stable (1946, 1966)
- 2 – Pin Oak Stable (1953, 1992)
- 2 – Meadow Stable (1961, 1967)
- 2 – Harbor View Farm (1965, 1973)

== Winners ==
Year	Winner	Age	Jockey	Trainer	Owner	Dist. (Furlongs)	Time	Win$	Grade
2005	Sensation	2	Eibar Coa	Stanley M. Hough	Cobra Farm & Castletop Stable	6.5 F	1:16.90	$60,000	G III
2004	Toll Taker	2	Eibar Coa	Timothy A. Hills	Patrick Welsh	6.5 F	1:18.16	$60,000	G III
2003	Spectacular Moon	2	Jorge Chavez	John V. Alecci	John V. Alecci	6.5 F	1:17.16	$90,000	G II
2002	Humorous Lady	2	Jerry Bailey	Michael R. Smith	S. David Plummer	6.5 F	1:17.76	$90,000	G II
2001	Bella Bellucci	2	Gary Stevens	Neil D. Drysdale	Michael Tabor	6.5 F	1:16.67	$60,000	G II
2000	Xtra Heat	2	Mark Johnston	John Salzman Sr.	Kenneth Taylor/John Salzman Sr./Harry Deitchman	6.5 F	1:16.71	$60,000	G II
1999	Silentlea	2	Robbie Davis	James A. Jerkens	Grace E. Ritzenberg	6.5 F	1:17.44	$60,000	G II
1998	Paved in Gold	2	Jorge Chavez	Michael T. Trivigno	Brian S. Dance	6.5 F	1:18.86	$60,000	G II
1997	Ninth Inning	2	Robbie Davis	James A. Jerkens	Peter Blum	6.5 F	1:17.44	$60,000	G II
1996	Broad Dynamite	2	Dale Cordova	Damon Pollard	Joseph D. Kowal	6.5 F	1:24.02	$60,000	G II
1995	Top Secret	2	Mike E. Smith	George R. Arnold II	John H. Peace	8 F	1:36.79	$60,000	G II
1994	Miss Golden Circle	2	Julie Krone	John C. Kimmel	Caesar Kimmel & Philip Solondz	6.5 F	1:23.67	$60,000	G II
1993	Shapely Scrapper	2	Joe Bravo	Benjamin W. Perkins Jr.	Candy Stable (Herb & Ellen Moelis)	6.5 F	1:24.02	$60,000	G II
1992	Missed The Storm	2	Mike E. Smith	William I. Mott	Pin Oak Stable	6.5 F	1:24.90	$60,000	G II
1991	Easy Now	2	Mike E. Smith	C. R. McGaughey III	Ogden Phipps	6.5 F	1:22.84	$60,000	G II
1990	Devlish Touch	2	Craig Perret	Carlos A. Garcia	Burning Tree Farm (Jerry Roth, et al.)	6.5 F	1:18.36	$60,000	G II
1989	Dance Colony	2	José A. Santos	Ross R. Pierce	Buckland Farm	6.5 F	1:17.80	$60,000	G II
1988	Channel Three	2	Carlos Barrera	Michael J. Goswell	Elser Farms Corp.	6.5 F	1:17.00	$60,000	G II
1987	Flashy Runner	2	Jacinto Vásquez	Frank A. Alexander	Barry K. Schwartz	6.5 F	1:16.60	$60,000	G II
1986	Cagey Exuberance	2	John Nied Jr.	Robert W. Camac	Lindsey D. Burbank	6.5 F	1:18.20	$45,000	G II
1985	Gaudery	2	Ángel Cordero Jr.	Jan H. Nerud	John A. Nerud	6.5 F	1:17.00	$45,000	G II
1984	Mom's Command	2	Abigail Fuller	Edward T. Allard	Peter D. Fuller	6.5 F	1:17.80	$45,000	G II
1983	Tinas Ten	2	Richard Migliore	Richard T. DeStasio	Albert Fried Jr.	6.5 F	1:19.20	$30,000	G II
1982	Wings of Jove	2	Herb McCauley	Charles P. Sanborn	Helmore Farm (Edgar M. Lucas)	6.5 F	1:16.80	$30,000	G II
1981	Before Dawn	2	Jorge Velásquez	John M. Veitch	Calumet Farm	6.5 F	1:16.60	$30,000	G II
1980	Sweet Revenge	2	Jorge Velásquez	Del W. Carroll	William S. Farish III	6.5 F	1:17.20	$33,360	G III
1979	Royal Suite	2	Jeffrey Fell	Roger Laurin	Reginald N. Webster	6.5 F	1:17.20	$25,815	G III
1978	Fall Aspen	2	Roger Velez	James E. Picou	Joseph M. Roebling	6.5 F	1:17.00	$24,000	G III
1977	Lakeville Miss	2	Ruben Hernandez	Jose A. Martin	Randolph Weinsier	6.5 F	1:17.80	$21,000	G III
1976	Sensational	2	Ángel Cordero Jr.	Woody Stephens	Mill House Stable	6.5 F	1:17.40	$22,185	G III
1975	Picture Tube	2	Eddie Maple	Anthony L. Basile	Bwamazon Farm (Millard A. Waldheim)	6.5 F	1:18.40	$23,340	G III
1974	Stulcer	2	Ángel Cordero Jr.	Warren A. Croll Jr.	Jaclyn Stable (W. S. Paley & Dr. Leon Levy)	6.5 F	1:16.40	$17,040	G III
1973	Raisela	2	Ron Turcotte	John W. Jacobs	Harbor View Farm	6.5 F	1:16.80	$17,610	G III
1972-1	Princess Doubleday	2	Braulio Baeza	David Sazer	Frank J. Sitzberger	6.5 F	1:17.20	$13,965	
1972-2	Waltz Fan	2	John Mallamo	Victor J. Nickerson	Mereworth Farm (Walter J. Salmon Jr.)	6.5 F	1:17.80	$14,040	
1971	Barely Even	2	Tommy Barrow	Louis M. Goldfine	Mrs. S. Leonard Gilmartin	7 F	1:23.40	$21,120	
1970	Deceit	2	Ron Turcotte	Del W. Carroll	Windfields Farm	7 F	1:23.80	$19,402	
1969	Cherry Sundae	2	John Rotz	George Seabo	Shelter Rock Stable	7 F	1:24.80	$19,890	
1968-1	Show Off	2	Eddie Belmonte	Willard C. Freeman	Alfred G. Vanderbilt Jr.	7 F	1:25.00	$14,803	
1968-2	Dihela	2	Ron Turcotte	Sidney J. Smith	Alfred J. Giordano	7 F	1:24.20	$14,966	
1967	Syrian Sea	2	Bobby Ussery	Casey Hayes	Meadow Stable	7 F	1:22.60	$19,175	
1966	Irish County	2	Braulio Baeza	Edward A. Neloy	Wheatley Stable	7 F	1:24.40	$19,370	
1965-1	Swift Lady	2	Bill Shoemaker	Burley E. Parke	Harbor View Farm	7 F	1:23.60		
1965-2	Lady Pitt (DH)	2	Ron Turcotte	Stephen A. DiMauro	Thomas A. Eazor	7 F	1:23.00		
1965-2	Prides Profile (DH)	2	Donald Pierce	Sam N. Edmundson	Clarence W. Smith	7 F	1:23.00		
1964	I Deceive †	2	Fernando Alvarez	Charles P. Sanborn	Ernest H. Wood	7 F	1:26.60	$19,955	
1963-1	Petite Rouge	2	Johnny Sellers	Woody Sedlacek	Jacques D. Wimpheimer	7 F	1:23.60	$14,348	
1963-2	Tosmah	2	Sam Boulmetis Sr.	Joseph W. Mergler	Briardale Farm (Anthony Imbesi)	7 F	1:23.60	$14,511	
1962	Main Swap	2	Braulio Baeza	Charles R. Parke	Fred W. Hooper	7 F	1:23.00	$19,272	
1961	Cicada	2	Bill Shoemaker	Casey Hayes	Meadow Stable	7 F	1:24.40	$19,630	
1957	Polamby	2	Pete Anderson	MacKenzie Miller	Ned W. Brent	7 F	1:25.80	$18,550	
1956	Alanesian	2	William Boland	James W. Maloney	William Haggin Perry	6 F	1:10.00	$11,450	
1955	Cosmah †	2	Karl Korte	Frank J. Zitto	Eugene Mori	6 F	1:11.40	$12,200	
1954	Two Stars	2	Nick Shuk	Sherrill W. Ward	Howard Adams Flanigan	6 F	1:12.80	$12,800	
1953	Make A Play	2	Ben Green	Thomas A. Kelly	Pin Oak Stable	6 F	1:13.20	$8,450	
1952	Grecian Queen	2	Eric Guerin	James P. Conway	Florence Whitaker	6 F	1:13.60	$8,925	
1951	Place Card	2	Arnold Kirkland	Virgil W. Raines	Brandywine Stable	6 F	1:12.60	$9,575	
1950	Jacodema	2	Robert Permane	Kay E. Jensen	Apheim Stable (Bernard Heiman)	6 F	1:12.00	$8,950	
1949	Blue Kay	2	Ted Atkinson	Harold Crouch	Elkcam Stables	6 F	1:14.00	$9,375	
1948	Nell K	2	Douglas Dodson	John B. Partridge	Spring Hill Farm	6 F	1:14.60	$10,275	
1947	Bellesoeur	2	Tommy May	George P. "Maj" Odom	Mrs. Laudy Lawrence	6 F	1:12.60	$9,650	
1946	Keynote	2	Hedley Woodhouse	James E. Fitzsimmons	Wheatley Stable	6 F	1:11.20	$10,325	

- † In 1964 Queen Empress won by a nose but was disqualified to second for interference.
- † In 1962 Smart Deb won what would have been her eighth straight win had she not been disqualified for interference.
- † In 1955 Dark Charger won but was disqualified to last.
