= Curalina =

American-bred Thoroughbred racehorse

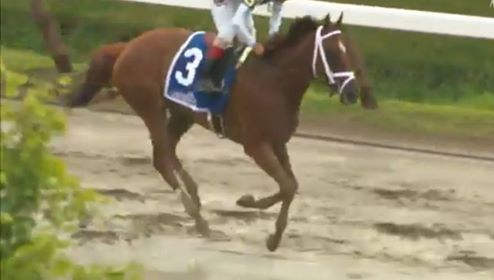
- Curalina after winning the Shuvee.
- Sire: Curlin
- Grandsire: Smart Strike
- Dam: Whatdreamsrmadeof
- Damsire: Graeme Hall
- Sex: Mare
- Foaled: 2012
- Country: United States
- Color: Chestnut
- Breeder: CASA Farms I, LLC
- Owner: Eclipse Thoroughbred Partners
- Trainer: Todd A. Pletcher
- Record: 13: 6-3-2
- Earnings: $1,535,940

Major wins
- Acorn Stakes (2015); Coaching Club American Oaks (2015); La Troienne Stakes (2016); Shuvee Handicap (2016)

Honors
- Aiken-Trained Horse of the Year (2015, 2016)

Curalina (foaled May 5, 2012, in Kentucky) is a retired American Thoroughbred racehorse and broodmare who as a 3-year-old won the first two legs of the New York Triple Tiara, the grade I Acorn Stakes and the grade I Coaching Club American Oaks.

== Background ==
Curalina is a chestnut mare with a diamond-shaped star on her forehead and a coronet marking on her hind legs. Curalina was bred by CASA Farms I, LLC, and sold at the 2013 Keeneland September Yearling Sale for $125,000 to Eclipse Thoroughbred Partners & Dogwood Stable. She is a daughter of champion Curlin. Her dam, Whatdreamsrmadeof (foaled March 26, 2004 in New York), a granddaughter of Smart Strike, was retired after injury with earnings of $137,080 from a 7:2-3-1 record with her best race being a second-place finish in the 2007 Fair Grounds Oaks. Her fourth foal was Curalina.

== Racing career ==
=== 2014: two-year-old season ===
Curalina finished 2nd in her debut a Maiden Special Weight at Saratoga on July 27, 2014. She lost to High Dollar Woman who won by 1 1/4 lengths while being the favorite.

=== 2015: three-year-old season ===
Curalina started her 3-year-old campaign by winning a Maiden Special Weight at Gulfstream Park on March 28, 2015, by 1 length being the Favorite. She then went to an Allowance Optional Claiming on May 1, which she won by 8 1/4 lengths once again being the Favorite. She made her graded stakes debut in the GI Acorn Stakes, she was squeezed back at the start and pushed back to last, she gradually gained ground and moved up to 5th before the first turn, she stayed there until the final turn when By the Moon took the lead and opened up going into the stretch, Curalina started gaining ground and ran By the Moon down winning by a neck. She made her next start in the GI Coaching Club American Oaks on July 26; she was bumped at the start, but moved up to 2nd and stayed there most of the way. Into the stretch Curalina battled with I'm a Chatterbox; with one final surge Curalina was about to pass I'm a Chatterbox but I'm a Chatterbox hit Curalina and made her trip so I'm a Chatterbox won by a nose over Curalina. Then after the race Saratoga stewards ruled I'm a Chatterbox came into Curalina's path deep in the stretch and disqualified the top finisher to second. Curalina finished her 3-year-old season with a 3rd in the GI Alabama Stakes, a 2nd against older mares in the GI Beldame Stakes, and a strong 3rd in the GI Breeders' Cup Distaff.

=== 2016: four-year-old season ===
Curalina started her 4-year-old campaign by romping in the GI La Troienne Stakes by 7 1/4 lengths on May 6. She then went to the GI Ogden Phipps Stakes where she finished 4th while being the favorite. Then she rebounded with a 9 1/4 length romp in the GIII Shuvee Handicap on July 31. Her next start was the GI Personal Ensign Stakes where she lost by half a length to Cavorting. Curalina's next start was the GI Breeders' Cup Distaff where she finished a non-threatening flat 6th. Curalina was then sold at the 2016 Fasig-Tipton Kentucky Fall Mixed Sale, as a racing or broodmare prospect. Curalina sold for $3,000,000 to Shadai Farm in Japan. Curalina retired with 6 wins in 13 starts 3 places and 2 shows with $1,535,940 in Earnings.

== Breeding record ==
In February 2018, Curalina gave birth to a dark bay colt with a star by Japanese Triple Crown winner Deep Impact.

== Race record ==
Date	Track	Race	Grade	Distance	Finish	Time
7/27/2014	Saratoga Race Course	Maiden		6 furlongs	2nd	1:11.63
3/28/2015	Gulfstream Park	Maiden		7 furlongs	1st	1:27.32
5/1/2015	Churchill Downs	Allowance Optional Claiming		1 1 /16 miles	1st	1:44.71
6/6/2015	Belmont Park	Acorn Stakes	I	1 mile	1st	1:45.13
7/26/2015	Saratoga Race Course	Coaching Club American Oaks	I	1 1/8 miles	1st	1:49.71
8/22/2015	Saratoga Race Course	Alabama Stakes	I	1 1/4 miles	3rd	2:01.97
9/26/2015	Belmont Park	Beldame Stakes	I	1 1/8 miles	2nd	1:47.57
10/30/2015	Keeneland	Breeders' Cup Distaff	I	1 1/8 miles	3rd	1:48.98
5/6/2016	Churchill Downs	La Troienne Stakes	I	1 1/16 miles	1st	1:42.45
6/11/2016	Belmont Park	Ogden Phipps Stakes	I	1 1/16 miles	4th	1:40.14
7/31/2016	Saratoga Race Course	Shuvee Handicap	III	1 1/8 miles	1st	1:49.85
8/27/2016	Saratoga Race Course	Personal Ensign Stakes	I	1 1/8 miles	2nd	1:48.61
11/4/2016	Santa Anita Park	Breeders' Cup Distaff	I	1 1/8 miles	6th	1:49.20

== Pedigree ==
Pedigree of Curalina
Sire Curlin c. 2004	Smart Strike c. 1992	Mr. Prospector b. 1970	Raise a Native
Sire Curlin c. 2004	Smart Strike c. 1992	Mr. Prospector b. 1970	Gold Digger
Sire Curlin c. 2004	Smart Strike c. 1992	Classy 'n Smart b. 1981	Smarten
Sire Curlin c. 2004	Smart Strike c. 1992	Classy 'n Smart b. 1981	No Class
Sire Curlin c. 2004	Sherriff's Deputy b. 1994	Deputy Minister b. 1979	Vice Regent
Sire Curlin c. 2004	Sherriff's Deputy b. 1994	Deputy Minister b. 1979	Mint Copy
Sire Curlin c. 2004	Sherriff's Deputy b. 1994	Barbarika b. 1985	Bates Motel
Sire Curlin c. 2004	Sherriff's Deputy b. 1994	Barbarika b. 1985	War Exchange
Dam Whatdreamsrmadeof c. 2004	Graeme Hall b. 1997	Dehere b. 1991	Deputy Minister
Dam Whatdreamsrmadeof c. 2004	Graeme Hall b. 1997	Dehere b. 1991	Vice Regent
Dam Whatdreamsrmadeof c. 2004	Graeme Hall b. 1997	Win Crafty Lady b. 1988	Crafty Prospector
Dam Whatdreamsrmadeof c. 2004	Graeme Hall b. 1997	Win Crafty Lady b. 1988	Honeytab
Dam Whatdreamsrmadeof c. 2004	Eastern Ruckus b. 1996	Eastern Echo b. 1988	Damascus
Dam Whatdreamsrmadeof c. 2004	Eastern Ruckus b. 1996	Eastern Echo b. 1988	Wild Applause
Dam Whatdreamsrmadeof c. 2004	Eastern Ruckus b. 1996	Andrea Ruckus b. 1986	Bold Ruckus
Dam Whatdreamsrmadeof c. 2004	Eastern Ruckus b. 1996	Andrea Ruckus b. 1986	Do's Melody
