= Lady Pitt =

American-bred Thoroughbred racehorse

- Sire: Sword Dancer
- Grandsire: Sunglow
- Dam: Rock Drill
- Damsire: Whirlaway
- Sex: Filly
- Foaled: 1963
- Country: United States
- Colour: Bay
- Breeder: John Greathouse
- Owner: Thomas A. Eazor
- Trainer: Stephen A. DiMauro
- Record: 27: 6-1-5
- Earnings: US$113,382

Major wins
- Astarita Stakes (1965); Delaware Oaks (1966); Mother Goose Stakes (1966); Vineland Handicap (1966); Coaching Club American Oaks (1966)

Awards
- American Champion Three-Year-Old Filly (1966)

Lady Pitt (foaled 1963 in Kentucky) was an American Thoroughbred Champion racehorse.

== Background ==
Lady Pitt was bred by John Greathouse at his Glencrest Farm near Midway, Kentucky. She was out of the mare Rock Drill, a daughter of the 1941 U.S. Triple Crown champion and U.S. Racing Hall of Fame inductee Whirlaway. Her sire was Sword Dancer, the 1960 American Horse of the Year and a U.S. Racing Hall of Fame inductee.

Owned by Pittsburgh, Pennsylvania businessman Thomas A. Eazor, who raced her under the name of Golden Triangle Stable, Lady Pitt was conditioned for racing by Stephen DiMauro.

== Racing career ==
At age two, she finished in a dead heat for first in the 1965 Astarita Stakes and ran second in the Demoiselle the Frizette Stakes and the Gardenia Stakes at Garden State Park in which she was beaten two and a half lengths by Moccasin. At age three, Lady Pitt was the top filly in the United States, earning American Champion Three-Year-Old Filly honors. Among her wins were the Mother Goose Stakes, the Delaware Oaks, Astarita Stakes, and the Coaching Club American Oaks. She also won the 1966 Alabama Stakes but was disqualified to second place.

Lady Pitt raced at age four and five. Her best results in top races for her class were a third in the 1967 Maskette Stakes and a second in the Santa Paula Handicap in 1968.

== Breeding record ==
Retired to broodmare duty, Lady Pitt produced nine foals. Of these, The Liberal Member (b. 1975), sired by Bold Reason, won the Grade I Brooklyn Handicap. Her filly Blitey (b. 1976), by Riva Ridge, was a multiple stakes winner.
