= Mom's Command =

American-bred Thoroughbred racehorse

- Mom's Command at Saratoga
- Sire: Top Command
- Grandsire: Bold Ruler
- Dam: Star Mommy
- Damsire: Pia Star
- Sex: Filly
- Foaled: March 14, 1982
- Country: United States
- Colour: Chestnut
- Breeder: Peter D. Fuller
- Owner: Peter D. Fuller
- Trainer: Edward T. "Ned" Allard
- Record: 16: 11–2–1
- Earnings: $902,972

Major wins
- Selima Stakes (1984); Astarita Stakes (1984); Priscilla Stakes (1984); Faneuil Miss Stakes (1984); Coaching Club American Oaks (1985); Acorn Stakes (1985); Mother Goose Stakes (1985); Alabama Stakes (1985); Comely Stakes (1985); Cherry Blossom Handicap (1985); Flirtation Stakes (1985)

Awards
- American Champion Three-Year-Old Filly (1985); 6th winner of the New York Filly Triple Tiara (1985); New England Horse of the Year (1985)

Honours
- Inducted into the racing wing of the New England Sports Hall of Fame (Summer, 2006); United States Racing Hall of Fame (2007)
- Last updated on February 13, 2010

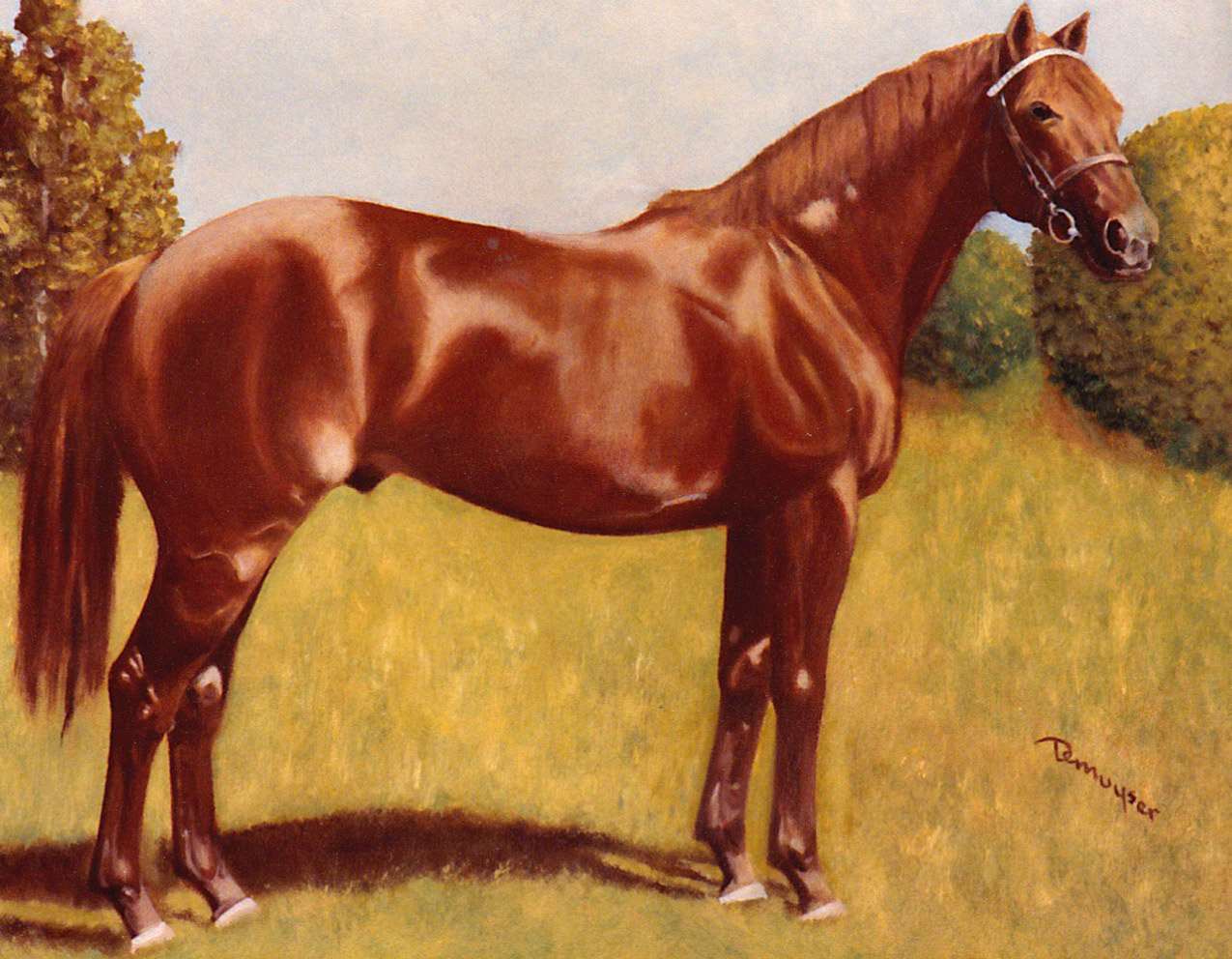
Top Command, oil on canvas Painting by Bob Demuyser (1920–2003)

Mom's Command (March 14, 1982 – February 3, 2007) was a multiple Grade I-winning American Thoroughbred race horse. In a two-year career, she won eleven of her sixteen races. In 1985, she was voted American Champion Three-Year-Old Filly at the Eclipse Awards.

== Background ==
Her breeder and owner was Peter D. Fuller of Runnymede Farm in North Hampton, New Hampshire, the son of former Massachusetts Governor Alvan T. Fuller. Fuller (who had once been a champion boxer and wrestler at Harvard University) bred his mare Star Mommy to the stallion Top Command (by Bold Ruler), hoping to produce a foal who combined speed and stamina. The result was Mom's Command.

The bright chestnut filly was trained by New Jersey-born Ned Allard, whose father was a professor at New York's Juilliard School of Music. She was ridden in all but two of her races by Peter Fuller's daughter, Abigail Fuller. At 26 years of age, she became the first woman jockey to ride the winner of a "Triple Tiara" event, and also the first to sweep the three races.

== Racing career ==
=== 1984: two-year-old season ===
Mom's Command won her first race, the ungraded Faneuil Miss Stakes, in July 1984 at New Hampshire's Rockingham Park after going off at odds of 44-1. After winning the Faneuil Miss, she appeared in the Grade II Astarita at Belmont Park; she broke from the starting gate five lengths behind the field and came back from last place to win. Following the Astarita, she took the Grade I Selima Stakes by 5½ lengths.

Three of her seven starts as a two-year-old had Daily Racing Form "trouble lines" (race notes) – "steadied at start"; "poor start" and "off poorly". However, she won four of those races.

=== 1985: three-year-old season ===
As a 3-year-old, Mom's Command dominated her competition, winning seven of her nine starts. In the Test Stakes, she finished second to another star filly, Lady's Secret, by two lengths. She won the stakes which constitute the Filly Triple Crown – the Acorn, the Mother Goose and the Coaching Club American Oaks (the latter by 2½ lengths). She preceded her Triple Crown victories with a 19-length win in the Flirtation Stakes at Pimlico Race Course and a second to the speedy Clocks Secret in the Goldfinch at Garden State Park. In the Goldfinch, she raced on a "dead rail" (deep mud on the rail) for nearly the entire distance. She returned to take the Cherry Blossom Handicap at Garden State and the Comely Stakes at Belmont Park. In the Comely, Clocks Secret finished six lengths behind Mom's Command; 11 lengths back was Lady's Secret.

Following her Triple Crown, Mom's Command then won the Grade I Alabama Stakes, leading all the way and defeating Fran's Valentine by four lengths. Fran's Valentine was the betting favorite, since she had won six of seven starts and her jockey was the well-known Chris McCarron; however, the Daily Racing Form notes that Mom's Command was "ridden out" (winning easily, without additional urging). In 1985, Mom's Command won the Eclipse Award as American Champion Three-Year-Old Filly.

She was the sixth horse to win the Filly Triple Crown. Her five predecessors were Dark Mirage (1968), Shuvee (1969), Chris Evert (1974), Ruffian (1975) and Davona Dale (1979). Beside Mom's Command, only Shuvee also won the Alabama Stakes (which replaced the Acorn in the "Triple Tiara", from 2003 to 2006). The Alabama, run at Saratoga, is the filly counterpart of the Grade I Travers Stakes. Every filly who ever beat Mom's Command was then defeated by Mom's Command (including Lady's Secret, noted above). She won at distances ranging from five furlongs to 1½ miles. Hall of Fame jockey Angel Cordero Jr. once said to Peter Fuller: "I love Mom's Command and I love your daughter Abby, but I'm sick of looking at both of their rear ends."

== Retirement ==
Billboard at Runnymede Farm in North Hampton, New Hampshire, featuring Mom's Command

Mom's Command was retired on September 29, 1985, after she injured her ankle while training for the Rare Perfume Stakes at Belmont Park. Her career earnings were $902,972. She foaled one stakes winner, Jonesboro. On February 3, 2007, Mom's Command was euthanized at Runnymede Farm at age 25, due to the infirmities of old age; she is buried on the farm.

== Honors ==
Mom's Command was inducted into the racing wing of the New England Sports Hall of Fame in the summer of 2006. She was elected to the National Museum of Racing and Hall of Fame in 2007.

== Pedigree ==
Pedigree of Mom's Command (USA), chestnut mare, 1982
Sire Top Command (USA) 1971	Bold Ruler (USA); 1954	Nasrullah	Nearco
Sire Top Command (USA) 1971	Bold Ruler (USA); 1954	Nasrullah	Mumtaz Begum
Sire Top Command (USA) 1971	Bold Ruler (USA); 1954	Miss Disco	Discovery
Sire Top Command (USA) 1971	Bold Ruler (USA); 1954	Miss Disco	Outdone
Sire Top Command (USA) 1971	Polly Girl (FR); 1962	Prince Bio	Prince Rose
Sire Top Command (USA) 1971	Polly Girl (FR); 1962	Prince Bio	Biologie
Sire Top Command (USA) 1971	Polly Girl (FR); 1962	Bella Paola	Ticino
Sire Top Command (USA) 1971	Polly Girl (FR); 1962	Bella Paola	Rhea
Dam Star Mommy (USA) 1972	Pia Star (USA); 1961	Olympia	Heliopolis
Dam Star Mommy (USA) 1972	Pia Star (USA); 1961	Olympia	Miss Dolphin
Dam Star Mommy (USA) 1972	Pia Star (USA); 1961	Inquisitive	Mahmoud
Dam Star Mommy (USA) 1972	Pia Star (USA); 1961	Inquisitive	Swistar
Dam Star Mommy (USA) 1972	Momamamu (USA); 1956	Mount Marcy	Mahmoud
Dam Star Mommy (USA) 1972	Momamamu (USA); 1956	Mount Marcy	Maud Muller
Dam Star Mommy (USA) 1972	Momamamu (USA); 1956	Recess	Count Fleet
Dam Star Mommy (USA) 1972	Momamamu (USA); 1956	Recess	Recce

== See also ==
- Dancer's Image, another horse owned by Peter D. Fuller
