= Comely Stakes =

- Class: Grade III
- Location: Aqueduct Racetrack; Queens, New York
- Inaugurated: 1945
- Race type: Thoroughbred – Flat racing
- Website: NYRA – Aqueduct Racetrack

Race information
- Distance: 1 1/8 mile (9 furlongs)
- Track: Dirt, left-handed
- Qualification: Three-year-old fillies
- Weight: Assigned
- Purse: $200,000

The Comely Stakes is an American Thoroughbred horse race held annually at Aqueduct Racetrack in Queens, New York. Open to three year old fillies, it is raced on dirt over a distance of one mile. The Grade III event offers a purse of $200,000.

The race was named in honor of the filly Comely, who, in a remarkable performance as a two-year-old, defeated older male horses in winning the first running of the Fall Highweight Handicap in 1914. Going into 2019, she remains the only two-year-old to win the Fall Highweight Handicap and one of only a few two-year-olds to defeat older horses in a major stakes race.

Inaugurated in 1945 at Jamaica Race Course, it was raced there through 1951 and again in 1959. For 1952 and 1953 it was hosted by the Empire City Race Track in Yonkers and Belmont Park in 1976, 1981, 1984, and again in 1985. There was no race run from 1954 to 1958. When revived in 1959 the race was open to two-year-olds of either sex and won by the 1960 Preakness Stakes winner, Bally Ache. On April 30, 1975 the superstar filly and future Hall of Fame inductee Ruffian won the Comely by eight lengths in stakes record time.

On May 11, 1985, Abigail Fuller became the first female jockey to win the Comely Stakes. She was aboard Mom's Command, a future Hall of Fame filly bred and raced by her father, Peter Fuller.

The Comely was run in two divisions in 1953, 1963, and 1970.

== Records ==
Speed record:

- 1:49.92 – @ 1 1/8 mile (9 furlongs) Wedding Toast (2013)
- 1:21.20 – @ 7 furlongs Ruffian (1975)

Most wins by a jockey:

- 4 – Braulio Baeza (1962, 1963, 1967, 1970)
- 4 – Jorge Chavez (1995, 1996, 1998, 2004)

Most wins by a trainer:

- 4 – H. Allen Jerkens (1976, 1994, 1997, 2004)

Most wins by an owner:

- 2 – Alfred G. Vanderbilt II (1951, 1953)
- 2 – Wheatley Stable (1960, 1970)
- 2 – William Haggin Perry (1963, 1964)
- 2 – George D. Widener Jr. (1965, 1969)
- 2 – Diana M. Firestone (1980, 1981)
- 2 – H. Joseph Allen (1982, 1989)
- 2 – Bohemia Stable (1994, 1997)
- 2 – Charles E. Fipke (2015, 2016)

== Winners ==
Year	Winner	Age	Jockey	Trainer	Owner	Dist. (Miles)	Time	Purse$	Gr.
2025	Fully Subscribed	3	Flavien Prat	Chad Brown	Klaravich Stables	1 1/8 M	1:50.55	$200,000	G3
2024	Pretty Ana	3	Jose Lezcano	Chad Brown	Three Chimneys Farm	1 1/8 M	1:49.99	$200,000	G3
2023	Raging Sea	3	Manuel Franco	Chad Brown	Alpha Delta Stables	1 1/8 M	1:50.86	$200,000	G3
2022	Sixtythreecaliber	3	Kendrick Carmouche	Thomas M. Amoss	My Racehorse Stable & Spendthrift Farm	1 1/8 M	1:53.89	$175,000	G3
2021	Bees and Honey	3	Jose Lezcano	J. Reeve McGaughey	Gainesway Farm & Andrew Rosen	1 1/8 M	1.54.41	$200,000	G3
2020	Mrs.Danvers	3	Jose Lezcano	Claude R. McGaughey III	Allen Stables Inc.	1 1/8 M	1.50.09	$100,000	G3
2019	Bellera	3	John R. Velazquez	Todd A. Pletcher	Mathis Stables	1 1/8 M	1:52.91	$110,000	G3
2018	Blamed	3	Julien Leparoux	William I. Mott	Cleber J. Massey	1 1/8 M	1:51.98	$120,000	G3
2017	Actress	3	José Ortiz	Jason Servis	Gary & Mary West	1 1/8 M	1:52.66	$150,000	G3
2016	Verve's Tale	3	Paco Lopez	Barclay Tagg	Charles E. Fipke	1 1/8 M	1:51.89	$150,000	G3
2015	Forever Unbridled	3	John R. Velazquez	Dallas Stewart	Charles E. Fipke	1 1/8 M	1:50.75	$180,000	G3
2014	Snowbell	3	Luis Saez	Thomas Albertrani	Godolphin Racing	1 1/8 M	1:52.59	$240,000	G3
2013	Wedding Toast	3	Javier Castellano	Kiaran McLaughlin	Godolphin Racing	1 1/8 M	1:49.92	$240,000	G3
2012	Broadway's Alibi	3	Javier Castellano	Todd A. Pletcher	E. Paul Robsham Stables	1 M	1:36.52	$150,000	G3
2011	Hot Summer	3	Luis Saez	David J. Fawkes	Harold L. Queen	1 M	1:35.58	$90,000	G3
2010	Touching Beauty	3	Mike Luzzi	James A. Jerkens	Gainesway Farm & Joseph M. Cornacchia	1 M	1:37.90	$60,000	G3
2009	Dream Play	3	Eddie Castro	Kiaran McLaughlin	Stewart Armstrong	1 M	1:39.51	$90,000	G2
2008	Sherine	3	Alan Garcia	Anthony W. Dutrow	Zayat Stables	1 M	1:37.25	$90,000	G2
2007	Boca Grande	3	Mike E. Smith	Claude R. McGaughey III	Phipps Stable	1 M	1:36.54	$90,000	G2
2006	Miraculous Miss	3	Kent Desormeaux	Steve Klesaris	Puglisi Stables & Steve Klesaris	1 M	1:36.67	$90,000	G2
2005	Acey Deucey	3	Diane Nelson	John D. Morrison	Jeffrey Tucker	1 M	1:35.95	$90,000	G2
2004	Society Selection	3	Jorge Chavez	H. Allen Jerkens	Irving & Majorie Cowan	1 M	1:35.89	$67,200	G3
2003	Cyber Secret	3	Shaun Bridgmohan	Richard E. Dutrow Jr.	Goldfarb et al.	1 M	1:35.97	$64,740	G3
2002	Bella Bellucci	3	Gary Stevens	Neil D. Drysdale	Michael Tabor	1 M	1:33.50	$64,920	G3
2001	Two Item Limit	3	Richard Migliore	Stephen L. DiMauro	Joseph Graffeo	1 M	1:36.17	$66,060	G3
2000	March Magic	3	Richard Migliore	Richard Violette Jr.	Ralph M. Evans	1 M	1:36.79	$65,460	G3
1999	Madison's Charm	3	Jean-Luc Samyn	Thomas A. Hauswald	Donald A. Adam	1 M	1:35.54	$65,520	G3
1998	Fantasy Angel	3	Jorge Chavez	Martin D. Wolfson	Martin L. Cherry	1 M	1:37.44	$69,300	G3
1997	Dixie Flag	3	Jean-Luc Samyn	H. Allen Jerkens	Bohemia Stable	1 M	1:36.96	$66,120	G3
1996	Little Miss Fast	3	Jorge Chavez	Juan Serey	James A. Riccio	1 M	1:36.58	$65,940	G3
1995	Nappelon	3	Jorge Chavez	Rene Araya	R Kay Stable	1 M	1:36.26	$64,440	G2
1994	Dixie Luck	3	Filiberto Leon	H. Allen Jerkens	Bohemia Stable	1 M	1:37.02	$66,240	G2
1993	Private Light	3	Robbie Davis	Claude R. McGaughey III	Ogden Mills Phipps	1 1/16 M	1:44.19	$68,280	G2
1992	Saratoga Dew	3	Herb McCauley	Gary Sciacca	Charles F. Engel	1 M	1:37.22	$69,480	G2
1991	Meadow Star	3	Chris Antley	LeRoy Jolley	Carl Icahn	1 M	1:38.00	$67,560	G2
1990	Fappaburst	3	Jacinto Vásquez	Philip G. Johnson	Susan Kaskel	7 F	1:21.60	$49,770	G2
1989	Surging	3	Ángel Cordero Jr.	D. Wayne Lukas	H. Joseph Allen	7 F	1:23.00	$52,290	G2
1988	Avie's Gal	3	Jorge Velásquez	John J. Lenzini Jr.	John Cioci	7 F	1:22.40	$95,550	G2
1987	Devil's Bride	3	Rafael Meza	John Gosden	Oak Cliff Stable	7 F	1:23.60	$65,790	G3
1986	Misty Drone	3	Jacinto Vásquez	Alton H. Quanbeck	Maud McDougald	7 F	1:24.00	$59,940	G3
1985	Mom's Command	3	Abigail Fuller	Edward T. Allard	Peter D. Fuller	7 F	1:22.20	$55,170	G3
1984	Wild Applause	3	Pat Day	MacKenzie Miller	Rokeby Stable	7 F	1:23.20	$52,110	G3
1983	Able Money	3	Antonio Graell	Anthony Russo	Faith Donnelly	7 F	1:23.80	$35,580	G3
1982	Nancy Huang	3	Jorge Velásquez	Howard M. Tesher	H. Joseph Allen	7 F	1:24.40	$34,860	G3
1981	Expressive Dance	3	Don MacBeth	LeRoy Jolley	Diana M. Firestone	7 F	1:23.40	$35,220	G3
1980	Cybele	3	Cash Asmussen	LeRoy Jolley	Diana M. Firestone	7 F	1:22.60	$27,225	G3
1979	Countess North	3	Ángel Cordero Jr.	Stephen A. DiMauro	Michael Rutherford	7 F	1:23.40	$25,725	G3
1978	Mashteen	3	Ruben Hernandez	Laz Barrera	Leslie Combs II	7 F	1:23.00	$25,665	G3
1977	Bring Out The Band	3	Don Brumfield	James W. Murphy	Hickory Tree Stable	7 F	1:23.60	$22,650	G3
1976	Tell Me All	3	John Ruane	H. Allen Jerkens	Hobeau Farm	7 F	1:23.20	$22,080	G3
1975	Ruffian	3	Jacinto Vásquez	Frank Y. Whiteley Jr.	Locust Hill Farm	7 F	1:21.20	$16,755	G3
1974	Clear Copy	3	Daryl Montoya	Jerome Hirsch	Leon J. Hekimian	7 F	1:24.40	$17,670	G3
1973	Java Moon	3	Ángel Cordero Jr.	Lou Rondinello	Darby Dan Farm	7 F	1:22.80	$17,610	G3
1972	Stacey d'Ette	3	John Ruane	Dave Erb	Dave Erb	7 F	1:21.60	$16,290	
1971	Forward Gal	3	Michael Hole	Warren A. Croll Jr.	Aisco Stable	7 F	1:23.40	$20,460	
1970-1	Predictable	3	Robert Ussery	Edward A. Neloy	Wheatley Stable	7 F	1:24.00	$14,852	
1970-2	Royal Signal	3	Braulio Baeza	Stephen A. DiMauro	Mrs. Lawrence W. Knapp Jr.	7 F	1:24.00	$15,015	
1969	Ta Wee	3	Eddie Belmonte	John A. Nerud	Tartan Stable	7 F	1:22.60	$18,492	
1968	Best In Show	3	Heliodoro Gustines	John H. Skirvin	Clearview Stable	7 F	1:22.40	$19,240	
1967	Gala Honors	3	Braulio Baeza	Clyde Troutt	Ada L. Rice	7 F	1:25.00	$18,947	
1966	Swift Lady	3	John L. Rotz	Burley Parke	Harbor View Farm	7 F	1:23.60	$18,785	
1965	What a Treat	3	John L. Rotz	Sylvester E. Veitch	George D. Widener Jr.	7 F	1:24.80	$17,680	
1964	Face The Facts	3	Manuel Ycaza	James W. Maloney	William Haggin Perry	7 F	1:23.80	$18,525	
1963-1	Pams Ego	3	Milo Valenzuela	J. P. "Sammy" Smith	Clear Springs Stable	7 F	1:23.80	$11,456	
1963-2	Lamb Chop	3	Braulio Baeza	James W. Maloney	William Haggin Perry	7 F	1:24.40	$11,326	
1962	Upswept	3	Braulio Baeza	Robert L. Dotter	James Cox Brady Jr.	7 F	1:24.60	$15,438	
1961	Seven Thirty	3	Hedley Woodhouse	Bert Mulholland	George D. Widener Jr.	7 F	1:24.20	$15,112	
1960	Irish Jay	3	Eddie Arcaro	James E. Fitzsimmons	Wheatley Stable	7 F	1:23.00	$18,680	
1959	Bally Ache	2	David Erb	Jimmy Pitt	Leonard D. Fruchtman	5 F	0:59.20	$11,362	
1954 –1958	Race not held								
1953-1	La Corredora	4	Ira Hanford	Carl Hanford	Marian W. O'Connor	1 1/8 M	1:45.20	$18,987	
1953-2	Home Made	3	Eric Guerin	Bill Winfrey	Alfred Gwynne Vanderbilt Jr.	1 1/8 M	1:45.20	$19,237	
1952	Devilkin	3	William Boland	Max Hirsch	John W. Hanes	1 1/8 M	1:44.60	$20,250	
1951	Bed O' Roses	4	Eric Guerin	Bill Winfrey	Alfred Gwynne Vanderbilt Jr.	1 1/8 M	1:44.60	$20,250	
1950	Siama	3	Ovie Scurlock	Moody Jolley	Cain Hoy Stable	1 1/8 M	1:45.00	$20,700	
1949	Lithe	3	Herb Lindberg	Frank S. Barnett	Hal Price Headley	1 1/8 M	1:45.20	$20,200	
1948	Conniver	4	Eric Guerin	William Post	Harry La Montagne	1 1/8 M	1:45.00	$19,225	
1947	Elpis	3	Larry Hansman	Willie Booth	William G. Helis Sr.	1 1/8 M	1:44.20	$16,700	
1946	Bonnie Beryl	3	Hedley Woodhouse	James E. Fitzsimmons	Belair Stud	1 1/8 M	1:44.20	$15,615	
1945	Moon Maiden	7	Wayne D. Wright	Hirsch Jacobs	Isidor Bieber	1 1/8 M	1:45.40	$15,615	
