= Dancer's Image =

American Thoroughbred

- Dancer's Image at stud in Ireland
- Sire: Native Dancer
- Grandsire: Polynesian
- Dam: Noors Image
- Damsire: Noor
- Sex: Stallion
- Foaled: April 10, 1965
- Died: December 26, 1992 (aged 27)
- Country: United States
- Color: Gray
- Breeder: Peter D. Fuller
- Owner: Peter D. Fuller
- Trainer: Lou Cavalaris Jr.
- Record: 24: 12–5–1
- Earnings: $236,636

Major wins
- Clarendon Stakes (1967); Grey Stakes (1967); Vandal Stakes (1967); Maryland Futurity Stakes (1967); Wood Memorial Stakes (1968); Kentucky Derby (1968) (disqualified)
- Last updated on May 18, 2010

Billboard at Runnymede Farm in North Hampton, New Hampshire, featuring Dancer's Image

Dancer's Image (April 10, 1965 – December 26, 1992) was an American Thoroughbred racehorse who was the first winner in the history of the Kentucky Derby to be disqualified.

== Background ==
Dancer's Image was a gray horse owned and bred by businessman Peter D. Fuller of Runnymede Farm in North Hampton, New Hampshire, the son of former Massachusetts Governor Alvan T. Fuller. Originally named A.T.'s Image in memory of Fuller's father, the horse was renamed Dancer's Image in preparation for sale at auction in February 1967, but Fuller ended up retaining ownership. The colt was trained by Lou Cavalaris Jr. and ridden in the Derby by jockey Bobby Ussery. Dancer's Image's sire was Native Dancer, who won the Preakness Stakes, the Belmont Stakes, and was voted the United States Horse of the Year for 1954 and who, in turn, was a son of the 1945 Preakness Stakes winner, Polynesian.

== Racing career ==
=== Early career ===
At age two, Dancer's Image won graded stakes races in Maryland and at Woodbine Racetrack in Ontario, Canada. At age three, in the lead-up to the 1968 U.S. Triple Crown races, he won several more races including the Grade I Wood Memorial Stakes. For the Kentucky Derby, he was a second choice among bettors to Calumet Farm's Florida Derby and Blue Grass Stakes winner Forward Pass.

=== 1968 Kentucky Derby ===
Dancer's Image was plagued by sore ankles during his career. On the Sunday prior to the 1968 Kentucky Derby, his handlers had a veterinarian give him a dose of phenylbutazone, a nonsteroidal anti-inflammatory drug (NSAID) commonly used to relieve inflammation of the joints. At the time, it was illegal for phenylbutazone to be in a horse's system on race day at Churchill Downs; however, Dancer's Image's veterinarian and handlers believed the medication would clear his system in time for the Derby.

On Saturday, May 4, Dancer's Image won the Kentucky Derby, but was disqualified after traces of phenylbutazone were discovered in the mandatory post-race urine sample. The disqualification was announced on Tuesday, May 7, with second-place finisher Forward Pass declared the winner and Dancer's Image moved to last. The controversy filled the sporting news of media outlets in North America and was a cover story for Sports Illustrated, which referred to it as "the year's major sports story."

The next disqualification of a Kentucky Derby winner happened in 2019, when Maximum Security was disqualified for impeding the progress of several other horses.

=== 1968 Preakness Stakes ===
Dancer's Image ran in the 1968 Preakness Stakes, finishing third to Forward Pass. However, he was disqualified again and set back to eighth place, this time for bumping the horse Martins Jig. Continued ankle problems resulted in Dancer's Image being retired after the race.

== Kentucky Derby aftermath ==
Fuller and the horse's handlers filed an appeal of the disqualification, as they believed someone else may have been motivated to give the colt another dose of phenylbutazone. The Kentucky State Racing Commission examined the matter and ordered distribution of the purse with first money to Forward Pass. Fuller took legal action and, in December 1970, a Kentucky Court awarded first-place money to Dancer's Image. That decision was overturned on appeal in April 1972 by the Kentucky Court of Appeals in Kentucky State Racing Comm'n v. Fuller, 481 S.W.2d 298 (Ky. 1972).

Controversy and speculation still surround the incident, and in 2008 The New York Times called it "the most controversial Kentucky Derby ever". Forty years after the disqualification, owner Peter Fuller still believed he was a victim of a set-up, due to his being a wealthy civil rights sympathizer from Boston who offended the Kentucky racing aristocracy by donating Dancer's Image's $62,000 prize ($574,019 in 2025) for a previous victory to Coretta Scott King two days after her husband's murder. Fuller said he had anticipated that someone might interfere with his colt and asked Churchill Downs officials to provide extra security before the race, but they denied the request. As of 2008, the Churchill Downs media guide for the Derby still included the official chart showing Dancer's Image as the winner.

Legalized in 1974 by the Kentucky Racing Commission, phenylbutazone was so commonly used by 1986 that 13 of the 16 entrants in that year's Kentucky Derby were running on the medication.

== Stud record ==
Dancer's Image was syndicated and sent to stand at stud at Glade Valley Farms in Frederick, Maryland. Eventually his owners sold the colt, and in 1974 he was sent to breeders in Ireland, then in 1979 to Haras du Quesnay at Deauville, France, owned by renowned breeder Alec Head. During his time in Europe he had success with sprinters including the Group One winners Godswalk, Lianga and Saritamer. Dancer's Image was later sent to stand at stud in Japan, where he died at age 27 on December 26, 1992.

== Pedigree ==
Pedigree of Dancer's Image (USA), gray stallion, 1965
Sire Native Dancer (USA) 1950	Polynesian (USA); 1942	Unbreakable	Sickle
Sire Native Dancer (USA) 1950	Polynesian (USA); 1942	Unbreakable	Blue Glass
Sire Native Dancer (USA) 1950	Polynesian (USA); 1942	Black Polly	Polymelian
Sire Native Dancer (USA) 1950	Polynesian (USA); 1942	Black Polly	Black Queen
Sire Native Dancer (USA) 1950	Geisha (USA); 1943	Discovery	Display
Sire Native Dancer (USA) 1950	Geisha (USA); 1943	Discovery	Ariadne
Sire Native Dancer (USA) 1950	Geisha (USA); 1943	Miyako	John P Grier
Sire Native Dancer (USA) 1950	Geisha (USA); 1943	Miyako	La Chica
Dam Noor's Image (USA) 1953	Noor (GB); 1945	Nasrullah	Nearco
Dam Noor's Image (USA) 1953	Noor (GB); 1945	Nasrullah	Mumtaz Begum
Dam Noor's Image (USA) 1953	Noor (GB); 1945	Queen of Baghdad	Bahram
Dam Noor's Image (USA) 1953	Noor (GB); 1945	Queen of Baghdad	Queen of Scots
Dam Noor's Image (USA) 1953	Little Sphinx (USA); 1943	Challenger	Swynford
Dam Noor's Image (USA) 1953	Little Sphinx (USA); 1943	Challenger	Sword Play
Dam Noor's Image (USA) 1953	Little Sphinx (USA); 1943	Khara	Kai-Sang
Dam Noor's Image (USA) 1953	Little Sphinx (USA); 1943	Khara	Decree (Family 4-r)

== See also ==
- Mom's Command, another horse owned by Peter D. Fuller

== Sources ==
- Dancer's Image pedigree and racing stats
