= Coaching Club American Oaks =

American Thoroughbred stakes horse race

- Class: Grade I
- Location: Saratoga Race Course; Saratoga Springs, New York, United States
- Inaugurated: 1917
- Race type: Thoroughbred – Flat racing
- Website: www.nyra.com/saratoga/racing/stakes-schedule/coaching-club-american-oaks

Race information
- Distance: 1 1/8 miles (9 furlongs)
- Surface: Dirt
- Track: left-handed
- Qualification: Three-year-old fillies
- Weight: 121 lb (54.9 kg)
- Purse: $500,000

The Coaching Club American Oaks is a race for thoroughbred three-year-old fillies and the second leg of the Triple Tiara of Thoroughbred Racing. Originally run at Belmont Park, the Grade I $500,000 stakes race was moved to Saratoga Race Course in 2010.

Run as a handicap prior to 1928, the race is named in honor of the Coaching Club of New York. One of the requirements for membership in this club was the ability to handle a coach and four horses with a single group of reins. August Belmont Jr. set the original conditions in order to emulate The Oaks in England.

From 1963 to 1967 the Coaching Club American Oaks was run at Aqueduct Racetrack. Over the years, it has been raced at various distances:

- 1917, 2010–present: 9 furlongs
- 1990–1997, 2003–2009: 10 furlongs
- 1919–1941, 1944–1958: 11 furlongs
- 1942–1943, 1971–1989, 1998–2003: 12 furlongs

== Historical notes ==
Future U.S. Racing Hall of Fame inductee Mom's Command won the 1985 Oaks under jockey Abigail Fuller, daughter of the horse's owner, Peter Fuller.

== Records ==
Speed record:
(at distance of 12f)

- 2:27.80 – Ruffian (1975); Magazine (1973)

(at distance of 10f)

- 2:00.40 – Ajina (1997)

(at distance of 9f)

- 1:49.15 – It's Tricky (2011)

Most wins by a jockey:

- 5 – Mike E. Smith (1993, 1997, 2000, 2016, 2017)
- 5 – John R. Velazquez (2001, 2004, 2007, 2010, 2015)
- 4 – Jorge Velásquez (1974, 1977, 1979, 1988)
- 4 – Jerry D. Bailey (1996, 1998, 1999, 2003)

Most wins by a trainer:

- 8 – Todd Pletcher (2001, 2004, 2007, 2010, 2013, 2014, 2015, 2022)

Most wins by an owner:

- 6 – Calumet Farm (1944, 1949, 1952, 1958, 1977, 1979)

== Winners ==
Year	Winner	Jockey	Trainer	Owner	Time
2026	Counting Stars	Irad Ortiz Jr.	Mark E. Casse	West Point Thoroughbreds	1:48.98
2025	Scottish Lassie	Joel Rosario	Jorge R. Abreu	Sportsmen Stable, Parkland Thoroughbreds, Photo Finishes LLC, Corms Racing Stable & Jorge R. Abreu	1:50.23
2024	Thorpedo Anna	Brian Hernandez Jr.	Kenneth G. McPeek	Nader Alaali, Mark Edwards, Judy B. Hicks & Magdalena Racing	1:50.95
2023	Wet Paint	Flavien Prat	Brad H. Cox	Godolphin LLC	1:50.68
2022	Nest	Irad Ortiz Jr.	Todd Pletcher	Repole Stable, Eclipse Thoroughbred Partners, & Michael House	1:51.04
2021	Maracuja	Ricardo Santana Jr.	Rob Atras	Beach Haven Thoroughbreds LLC	1:49.29
2020	Paris Lights	Tyler Gaffalione	William I. Mott	WinStar Farm	1:50.81
2019	Guarana	José Ortiz	Chad C. Brown	Three Chimneys Farm	1:49.65
2018	Monomoy Girl	Florent Geroux	Brad H. Cox	Michael Dubb & Monomoy Stables	1:50.46
2017	Abel Tasman	Mike E. Smith	Bob Baffert	China Horse Club	1:51.74
2016	Songbird	Mike E. Smith	Jerry Hollendorfer	Fox Hill Farms	1:49.56
2015	Curalina (Note: In the 2015 race, I'm a Chatterbox crossed the finish line first, but was disqualified for interference.)	John R. Velazquez	Todd Pletcher	Eclipse Thoroughbred Partners	1:49.74
2014	Stopchargingmaria	Javier Castellano	Todd Pletcher	Repole Stable	1:49.80
2013	Princess of Sylmar	Javier Castellano	Todd Pletcher	Michael Dubb	1:51.07
2012	Questing	Irad Ortiz, Jr	Kiaran McLaughlin	Godolphin	1:50.30
2011	It's Tricky	Eddie Castro	Kiaran McLaughlin	Godolphin	1:49.15
2010	Devil May Care	John R. Velazquez	Todd Pletcher	Glencrest Farm	1:49.42
2009	Funny Moon	Alan Garcia	Christophe Clement	Mrs. C. Wilson McNeely III	2:02.44
2008	Music Note	Javier Castellano	Saeed bin Suroor	Godolphin	2:01.66
2007	Octave	John R. Velazquez	Todd Pletcher	Starlight Stables/Lucarell	2:02.17
2006	Wonder Lady Anne L	Edgar Prado	Richard E. Dutrow Jr.	IEAH Stables	2:04.63
2005	Smuggler	Edgar Prado	C. R. McGaughey III	Phipps Stable	2:04.39
2004	Ashado	John R. Velazquez	Todd Pletcher	Starlight/Saylor/Martin	2:02.43
2003	Spoken Fur	Jerry D. Bailey	Robert J. Frankel	Amerman Racing Stable	2:31.02
2002	Jilbab	Mike Luzzi	Saeed bin Suroor	Godolphin	2:31.48
2001	Tweedside	John R. Velazquez	Todd Pletcher	Eugene Melnyk	2:30.70
2000	Jostle	Mike E. Smith	John Servis	Fox Hill Farms	2:29.99
1999	On a Soapbox	Jerry D. Bailey	Niall M. O'Callaghan	Grimm & Voss	2:29.31
1998	Banshee Breeze	Jerry D. Bailey	Carl Nafzger	James B. Tafel	2:31.56
1997	Ajina	Mike E. Smith	William I. Mott	Allen E. Paulson	2:00.40
1996	My Flag	Jerry D. Bailey	C. R. McGaughey III	Ogden Phipps	2:04.64
1995	Golden Bri	José A. Santos	John C. Kimmel	Hilmer C.Schmidt	2:03.86
1994	Two Altazano	José A. Santos	Michael Stidham	Harold V. Goodman	2:02.88
1993	Sky Beauty	Mike E. Smith	H. Allen Jerkens	Georgia E. Hofmann	2:01.56
1992	Turnback the Alarm	Chris Antley	William V. Terrill	Valley View Farm	2:03.53
1991	Lite Light	Corey Nakatani	Jerry Hollendorfer	Oaktown Stable	2:00.54
1990	Charon	Craig Perret	Eugene Navarro	Stanley M. Ersoff	2:02.60
1989	Open Mind	Ángel Cordero Jr.	D. Wayne Lukas	Eugene V. Klein	2:32.40
1988	Goodbye Halo	Jorge Velásquez	Charles Whittingham	Arthur B. Hancock III	2:32.80
1987	Fiesta Gal	Ángel Cordero Jr.	D. Wayne Lukas	Eugene V. Klein	2:31.00
1986	Valley Victory	Randy Romero	Leo O'Brien	Richard N. Dick	2:28.00
1985	Mom's Command	Abigail Fuller	Edward T. Allard	Peter D. Fuller	2:32.00
1984	Class Play	Jean Cruguet	LeRoy Jolley	Peter M. Brant	2:29.80
1983	High Schemes	Jean-Luc Samyn	Philip G. Johnson	Joseph Morrisey Jr.	2:30.20
1982	Christmas Past	Jacinto Vásquez	Angel Penna Jr.	Cynthia Phipps	2:28.60
1981	Wayward Lass	Cash Asmussen	Jose A. Martin	Flying Zee Stable	2:28.20
1980	Bold 'n Determined	Ed Delahoussaye	Neil Drysdale	Saron Stable	2:31.80
1979	Davona Dale	Jorge Velásquez	John M. Veitch	Calumet Farm	2:30.00
1978	Lakeville Miss	Ruben Hernandez	Jose A. Martin	Randolph Weinsier	2:29.40
1977	Our Mims	Jorge Velásquez	John M. Veitch	Calumet Farm	2:29.40
1976	Revidere	Jacinto Vásquez	David A. Whiteley	William Haggin Perry	2:28.40
1975	Ruffian	Jacinto Vásquez	Frank Y. Whiteley Jr.	Locust Hill Farm	2:27.80
1974	Chris Evert	Jorge Velásquez	Joseph A. Trovato	Carl Rosen	2:28.80
1973	Magazine	Ángel Cordero Jr.	Victor J. Nickerson	Elmendorf Farm	2:27.80
1972	Summer Guest	Ron Turcotte	J. Elliott Burch	Rokeby Stable	2:29.40
1971	Our Cheri Amour	Jack Kurtz	Joseph G. Moos	Helen D. Vizzi	2:29.80
1970	Missile Belle	Pete D. Anderson	Woody Stephens	John A. Morris	2:03.80
1969	Shuvee	Jesse Davidson	Willard C. Freeman	Anne Minor Stone	2:03.20
1968	Dark Mirage	Manuel Ycaza	Everett W. King	Lloyd I. Miller	2:01.80
1967	Quillo Queen	Ernest Cardone	James E. Picou	Martin Andersen	2:03.40
1966	Lady Pitt	Walter Blum	Stephen A. DiMauro	Golden Triangle Stable	2:05.00
1965	Marshua	Ray Broussard	Norman R. McLeod	Mrs. Wallace Gilroy	2:02.60
1964	Miss Cavandish	Howard Grant	Roger Laurin	Harry S. Nichols	2:04.00
1963	Lamb Chop	Heliodoro Gustines	James W. Maloney	William Haggin Perry	2:02.80
1962	Bramalea	Bobby Ussery	James P. Conway	Darby Dan Farm	2:02.60
1961	Bowl of Flowers	Eddie Arcaro	J. Elliott Burch	Brookmeade Stable	2:03.20
1960	Berlo	Eric Guerin	Richard E. Handlen	Foxcatcher Farm	2:04.20
1959	Resaca	Manuel Ycaza	Buddy Hirsch	King Ranch	2:02.40
1958	A Glitter	Ismael Valenzuela	Horace A. Jones	Calumet Farm	2:20.00
1957	Williamette	John Choquette	Casey Hayes	Christopher Chenery	2:16.60
1956	Levee	Hedley Woodhouse	Norman R. McLeod	Vernon G. Cardy	2:16.60
1955	High Voltage	Ted Atkinson	James E. Fitzsimmons	Wheatley Stable	2:17.60
1954	Cherokee Rose	Henry Moreno	Eddie Hayward	Cain Hoy Stable	2:19.60
1953	Grecian Queen	Eric Guerin	James P. Conway	Florence Whitaker	2:18.60
1952	Real Delight	Eddie Arcaro	Horace A. Jones	Calumet Farm	2:17.80
1951	How	Eddie Arcaro	Horatio Luro	Herman B. Delman	2:16.60
1950	Next Move	Eric Guerin	William C. Winfrey	Alfred G. Vanderbilt II	2:15.80
1949	Wistful III	Steve Brooks	Ben A. Jones	Calumet Farm	2:19.60
1948	Scattered	Warren Mehrtens	Max Hirsch	King Ranch	2:18.80
1947	Harmonica	John Adams	Max Hirsch	John J. Watts	2:18.20
1946	Hypnotic	Paul Miller	James E. Fitzsimmons	Belair Stud	2:18.80
1945	Elpis	John Adams	Frank J. Kearns	William G. Helis	2:18.40
1944	Twilight Tear	Conn McCreary	Ben A. Jones	Calumet Farm	2:21.00
1943	Too Timely	George Woolf	Max Hirsch	King Ranch	2:35.00
1942	Vagrancy	Tommy Malley	James E. Fitzsimmons	Belair Stud	2:31.60
1941	Level Best	Alfred Robertson	John P. (Doc) Jones	Crispin Oglebay	2:17.60
1940	Damaged Goods	John Gilbert	J. M. Milburn	Starmount Stable	2:19.00
1939	War Plumage	Nick Wall	Howard Oots	James Cox Brady Jr.	2:16.80
1938	Creole Maid	Harry Richards	Preston M. Burch	Sarah F. Jeffords	2:20.80
1937	Dawn Play	Lester Balaski	Max Hirsch	King Ranch	2:18.60
1936	High Fleet	John Gilbert	Bert Mulholland	George D. Widener Jr.	2:19.60
1935	Black Helen	Don Meade	Bill Hurley	Edward R. Bradley	2:18.80
1934	Lady Reigh	Don Meade	James E. Fitzsimmons	Elsie Cassatt Stewart	2:18.80
1933	Edelweiss	John Gilbert	James E. Fitzsimmons	Wheatley Stable	2:20.60
1932	Top Flight	Raymond Workman	Thomas J. Healey	C. V. Whitney	2:20.20
1931	Tambour	Frank Coltiletti	Preston M. Burch	Preston M. Burch	2:20.40
1930	Snowflake	Louis Schaefer	Jack R. Pryce	Walter J. Salmon Sr.	2:18.40
1929	Sweet Verbena	John Maiben	John Sims Wallace	Lone Star Stable	2:18.00
1928	Bateau	Earl Sande	Scott P. Harlan	Walter M. Jeffords	2:24.00
1927	Nimba	Harold Thurber	George M. Odom	Marshall Field III	2:19.80
1926	Edith Cavell	Frank Coltiletti	Scott P. Harlan	Walter M. Jeffords	2:20.60
1925	Florence Nightingale	Lawrence McDermott	Robert A. Smith	Walter M. Jeffords	2:17.80
1924	Princess Doreen	Harry Stutts	Kay Spence	Audley Farm	2:19.20
1923	How Fair	Albert Johnson	Louis Feustel	August Belmont Jr.	2:18.40
1922	Prudish	L. Morris	James G. Rowe Sr.	Harry Payne Whitney	2:18.40
1921	Flambette	Earl Sande	John H. McCormack	P. A. Clark	2:17.40
1920	Cleopatra	Linus McAtee	William H. Karrick	William R. Coe	2:18.80
1919	Polka Dot	Lavelle Ensor	W. Hogan	P. A. Clark	2:20.20
1918	Rose d'Or	Lavelle Ensor	A. Jack Joyner	George D. Widener Jr.	2:06.60
1917	Wistful I	W. O'Brien	James H. McCormick	James Butler	1:53.60

== See also ==
- Acorn Stakes
