= Jacinto Vásquez =

Panamanian jockey (born 1944)

Personal information
- Born: January 4, 1944 (age 82) Panama
- Occupation: Jockey

Horse racing career
- Sport: Horse racing
- Career wins: 5,231

Major racing wins
- Acorn Stakes (1967, 1975); Amory L. Haskell Handicap (1967); Mother Goose Stakes (1967, 1975); New York Breeders' Cup Handicap (1968); Lexington Handicap (1970, 1976); Royal Palm Handicap (1970, 1980); Sanford Stakes (1970, 1981); Stymie Handicap (1970, 1978); Travers Stakes (1970, 1979); Excelsior Handicap (1971, 1985); Hopeful Stakes (1971); Withers Stakes (1971, 1985); Governor Stakes (1972); Hempstead Handicap (1972, 1978); Saratoga Special Stakes (1972, 1976); Test Stakes (1972, 1974, 1975); Frizette Stakes (1973); Long Island Handicap (1973, 1988); Wood Memorial (1973, 1975); Whitney Handicap (1973); Champagne Stakes (1974, 1989); Cowdin Stakes (1974, 1987, 1989); Demoiselle Stakes (1974); Fashion Stakes (1974); Juvenile Stakes (1974, 1977); Coaching Club American Oaks (1975, 1976, 1982); Comely Stakes (1975, 1986, 1990); Fall Highweight Handicap (1975, 1977); Gazelle Handicap (1975); Toboggan Handicap (1975); Vagrancy Handicap (1975); Gotham Stakes (1976, 1979, 1986); Queens County Handicap (1976); Roamer Handicap (1976); Jerome Handicap (1978); United Nations Handicap (1979, 1987); Man O' War Stakes (1980); Schuylerville Stakes (1981); Gardenia Stakes (1982); Pennsylvania Derby (1982); Red Smith Handicap (1982); Brooklyn Handicap (1983, 1989, 1990); Diana Handicap (1983); Kentucky Oaks (1983); Lexington Stakes (1983, 1988); Damon Runyon Stakes (1986, 1988, 1989); Blue Grass Stakes (1988, 1992); Old Hat Stakes (1988); Spinster Stakes (1988) American Classics / Breeders' Cup wins: Kentucky Derby (1975, 1980); Breeders' Cup Sprint (1986)

Honours
- United States Racing Hall of Fame (1998); Calder Hall of Fame (1999)

Significant horses
- Ruffian, Foolish Pleasure, Genuine Risk, Forego, Princess Rooney, Manila, Risen Star
- Updated on May 23, 2007

Jacinto Vásquez (born January 4, 1944) is a retired Panamanian thoroughbred horse racing jockey. He rode two Kentucky Derby winners, Foolish Pleasure in 1975 and the filly Genuine Risk in 1980. He was also the regular jockey for the champion filly Ruffian.

== Biography ==
Vasquez began working at the Presidente Remon Racetrack in Panama at age 15, and became a leading apprentice rider there before moving to the United States in 1960. He was based in New York for much of his career, and also frequently rode at Calder Race Course in Florida.

During his career Vasquez was the only jockey to defeat Secretariat three times: in the Wood Memorial with Angle Light, in the Whitney Handicap aboard Onion, and in Secretariat's maiden race aboard Quebec.

In 1975, Vasquez was the regular jockey for both Kentucky Derby winner Foolish Pleasure and Triple Tiara winner Ruffian. When "The Great match race" was set on July 6, 1975, between the two horses was arranged, Vasquez chose to ride Ruffian, leaving Foolish Pleasure for Braulio Baeza.

Beginning in February 1984, Jacinto Vasquez served a one-year suspension for attempting to bribe another jockey, a charge going back to 1975 which he vehemently denied and had fought through racing authority hearings and through the courts for nearly ten years.

Vasquez was the leading jockey at Calder five times, in the seasons ending in 1973, 1974, 1980, 1981, and 1991. Over his 37-year career, he raced 37,392 times, winning 14% of his races. When he retired in 1996, he was 15th on the all-time wins list for jockeys. He was elected to the National Museum of Racing and Hall of Fame in 1998 and the Calder Hall of Fame in 1999.

Since retiring as a jockey, Jacinto Vasquez has remained in racing and is now training horses in Ocala, Florida.
