= Wendell Eads =

American jockey

Personal information
- Born: June 10, 1923 Charleston, Illinois
- Died: June 5, 1997 (aged 73) Oakland, Illinois
- Resting place: Fairview Cemetery, East Oakland Township, Illinois
- Occupation: Jockey

Horse racing career
- Sport: Horse racing
- Career wins: Not found

Major racing wins
- Acorn Stakes (1941, 1943); Arlington-Washington Futurity Stakes (1941); Belmont Futurity Stakes (1941); Edgemere Handicap (1941); Gallant Fox Handicap (1941); Juvenile Stakes (1941); Palm Beach Handicap (1941); Pimlico Special (1941); Vosburgh Stakes (1941); Clark Handicap (1942); Saratoga Handicap (1942); Blue Grass Stakes (1943); Derby Trial Stakes (1943); Kentucky Oaks (1943); Arkansas Derby (1946)

Honors
- Leading Jockey at Arlington Park (1940, 1941)

Significant horses
- Whirlaway, Market Wise, Mar-Kell
- Updated on July 27, 2008

Wendell William Eads (June 10, 1923 – June 5, 1997) was an American Thoroughbred horse racing jockey. In the early 1940s he was a contract jockey with the prestigious Calumet Farm. Small, even by jockey standards, Eads weighed just 102 pounds and as a result could not control Calumet's extremely high strung but talented colt, Whirlaway. The problem cost Eads the chance to make history aboard Whirlaway who won the 1941 United States Triple Crown of Thoroughbred Racing.

During his career, Wendell Eads won a number of important races including the Blue Grass Stakes and the Pimlico Special. As well, he competed in two of the American Classic Races. He was aboard Sun Again for a third-place finish in the 1942 Preakness Stakes and rode Dove Pie to a seventh-place finish in the 1943 Kentucky Derby

Following his retirement from racing, Wendell Eads made his home in Oakland, Illinois where he was living at the time of his death in 1997.
