= Acorn Stakes =

- Class: Grade I
- Location: Belmont Park; Elmont, New York
- Inaugurated: 1931
- Race type: Thoroughbred – Flat racing

Race information
- Distance: 1 1/16 miles (8.5 furlongs)
- Surface: Dirt
- Track: left-handed
- Qualification: Three-year-old fillies
- Weight: Assigned
- Purse: $500,000 (2023)

The Acorn Stakes is an American Grade I race at Belmont Park in Elmont, New York for three-year-old Thoroughbred fillies. It is raced on dirt over a distance of one mile and a sixteenth with a current purse of $500,000. It is the first leg of the US Triple Tiara and is followed by the Coaching Club American Oaks then the Alabama Stakes. The filly must win all three races to win the Triple Tiara, as well as the third leg of the "National" Triple Tiara (Kentucky Oaks and George E. Mitchell Stakes are the others).

The Acorn Stakes was run at Aqueduct Racetrack from 1960 to 1967 and 1969 to 1975. There were two divisions in 1951, 1970 and 1974. There was a dead heat for first place in 1954 and again in 1956. The race was run at one mile from its inception until 2022. In 2023, the New York Racing Association lengthened the race to 1 1/16 miles. The 2024 Acorn was held at Saratoga Race Course at 1 1/8 miles due to construction at Belmont Park.

== Historic notes ==
The inaugural running of the Acorn Stakes took place on May 16, 1931, and was won by Baba Kenney. The filly was owned by Edward R. Bradley and trained by future U.S. Racing Hall of Fame inductee, Herbert J. Thompson.

Gallorette won the 1945 running of the Acorn and went on to earn American Champion Older Female Horse honors in 1946 and a career that would see her induction into the U. S. Racing Hall of Fame in 1962.

Ruffian, the ill-fated future Hall of Fame inductee, got her eighth straight career win in the 1975 edition of the Acorn. She did it in a new stakes record time, continuing her streak of either beating or equaling the record in every one of her major race victories, those being the Fashion, Astoria, Sorority and the Spinaway Stakes.

Riding her father's filly Mom's Command, in 1985 Abigail Fuller became the first female jockey to win the Acorn Stakes. It would be another 28 years before a female rider accomplished the feat when Rosie Napravnik won the 2013 edition aboard Midnight Lucky .

== Records ==
Speed record (at previous one mile distance):

- 1:32.55 – Gamine (2020)

Most wins by an owner:

- 6 – Calumet Farm (1941, 1943, 1944, 1956*, 1979)
- 5 – Wheatley Stable (1933, 1939, 1955, 1960, 1964)

*Two horses owned by Calumet Farm finished in a dead heat for first in 1956

Most wins by a jockey:

- 5 – Eddie Arcaro (1945, 1946, 1948, 1955, 1961)
- 5 – Mike E. Smith (1993, 1994, 1996, 1998, 2017)
- 5 - John R. Velazquez (2000, 2007, 2008, 2015, 2020)

== Winners ==
Year	Winner	Jockey	Trainer	Owner	Dist. (Miles)	Time	Win$	Gr.
2026	Counting Stars	Irad Ortiz Jr.	Mark E. Casse	West Point Thoroughbreds	1 1/8 m	1:48.85	$275,000	G1
2025	La Cara	Dylan Davis	Mark E. Casse	Tracy Farmer	1 1/8 m	1:49.20	$275,000	G1
2024	Thorpedo Anna	Brian Hernandez Jr.	Kenneth G. McPeek	Nader Alaali, Mark Edwards, Judy B. Hicks & Magdalena Racing	1 1/8 m	1:49.02	$275,000	G1
2023	Pretty Mischievous	Tyler Gaffalione	Brendan Walsh	Godolphin	1 1/16 m	1:43.33	$275,000	G1
2022	Matareya	Flavien Prat	Brad H. Cox	Godolphin	1 m	1:35.77	$275,000	G1
2021	Search Results	Javier Castellano	Chad Brown	Klaravich Stables	1 m	1:35.50	$275,000	G1
2020	Gamine	John Velazquez	Bob Baffert	Michael Lund Petersen	1 m	1:32.55	$165,000	G1
2019	Guarana	José Ortiz	Chad C. Brown	Three Chimneys Farm	1 m	1:33.58	$375,000	G1
2018	Monomoy Girl	Florent Geroux	Brad H. Cox	Stuart Grant, Michael Dubb, Monomoy Stables, LLC	1 m	1:34.10	$375,000	G1
2017	Abel Tasman	Mike E. Smith	Bob Baffert	China Horse Club International Ltd./Clearsky Farms	1 m	1:35.37	$375,000	G1
2016	Carina Mia	Julien Leparoux	William Mott	Three Chimneys Farm	1 m	1:34.97	$375,000	G1
2015	Curalina	John Velazquez	Todd Pletcher	Eclipse Thoroughbred Partners (Aron Wellman et al.)	1 m	1:35.13	$375,000	G1
2014	Sweet Reason	Irad Ortiz Jr	Leah Gyarmati	Treadway Racing Stable	1 m	1:34.98	$400,000	G1
2013	Midnight Lucky	Rosie Napravnik	Bob Baffert	Mike Pegram, Karl Watson & Paul Weitman	1 m	1:35.11	$180,000	G1
2012	Contested	Javier Castellano	Bob Baffert	Natalie J. Baffert	1 m	1:34.61	$180,000	G1
2011	It's Tricky	Eddie Castro	Kiaran McLaughlin	Darley Stable	1 m	1:35.48	$180,000	G1
2010	Champagne d'Oro	Martin Garcia	Eric Guillot	Southern Equine Stables (Eric Guillot & Mike Moreno)	1 m	1:37.44	$180,000	G1
2009	Gabby's Golden Gal	Javier Castellano	Bob Baffert	Arnold Zetcher	1 m	1:34.79	$180,000	G1
2008	Zaftig	John Velazquez	James A. Jerkens	Susan Moore et al.	1 m	1:34.50	$150,000	G1
2007	Cotton Blossom	John R. Velazquez	Todd A. Pletcher	Dogwood Stable	1 m	1:34.70	$150,000	G1
2006	Bushfire	Alex Solis	Eddie Kenneally	Ron & Ricki Rashinski	1 m	1:35.89	$150,000	G1
2005	Round Pond	Stewart Elliott	John Servis	Fox Hill Farms, Inc. (Rick Porter)	1 m	1:35.20	$150,000	G1
2004	Island Sand	Terry J. Thompson	J. Larry Jones	James Osbrone	1 m	1:34.80	$150,000	G1
2003	Bird Town	Edgar Prado	Nick Zito	Marylou Whitney Stable	1 m	1:35.20	$150,000	G1
2002	You	Jerry Bailey	Robert J. Frankel	Edmund A. Gann	1 m	1:34.00	$150,000	G1
2001	Forest Secrets	Chris McCarron	John Ward Jr.	Debby M. Oxley	1 m	1:34.80	$150,000	G1
2000	Finder's Fee	John Velazquez	C. R. McGaughey III	Ogden Phipps	1 m	1:37.20	$120,000	G1
1999	Three Ring	Jerry Bailey	Edward Plesa Jr.	Barry K. Schwartz	1 m	1:36.00	$150,000	G1
1998	Jersey Girl	Mike E. Smith	Todd A. Pletcher	Ackerley Bros. Farm	1 m	1:36.20	$90,000	G1
1997	Sharp Cat	Gary Stevens	D. Wayne Lukas	The Thoroughbred Corp.	1 m	1:34.40	$90,000	G1
1996	Star de Lady Ann	Mike E. Smith	William W. Perry	John D. Murphy	1 m	1:34.60	$90,000	G1
1995	Cat's Cradle	Chris Antley	David Hofmans	Georgia B. Ridder	1 m	1:37.40	$90,000	G1
1994	Inside Information	Mike E. Smith	C. R. McGaughey III	Ogden Mills Phipps	1 m	1:34.26	$90,000	G1
1993	Sky Beauty	Mike E. Smith	H. Allen Jerkens	Georgia E. Hofmann	1 m	1:35.40	$90,000	G1
1992	Prospectors Delite	Pat Day	Neil J. Howard	James Elkins, W. S. Farish III & W. Temple Webber	1 m	1:35.00	$113,400	G1
1991	Meadow Star	Jerry Bailey	LeRoy Jolley	Carl Icahn	1 m	1:37.40	$103,680	G1
1990	Stella Madrid	Ángel Cordero Jr.	D. Wayne Lukas	Peter M. Brant	1 m	1:36.00	$104,580	G1
1989	Open Mind	Ángel Cordero Jr.	D. Wayne Lukas	Eugene V. Klein	1 m	1:35.40	$111,960	G1
1988	Aptostar	Robbie Davis	H. Allen Jerkens	Centennial Farms (Donald Little)	1 m	1:34.80	$109,980	G1
1987	Grecian Flight	Craig Perret	Joseph H. Pierce Jr.	Henry C. Lindh	1 m	1:35.20	$113,580	G1
1986	Lotka	Jerry Bailey	Woody Stephens	Henryk de Kwiatkowski	1 m	1:35.20	$109,080	G1
1985	Mom's Command	Abigail Fuller	Edward T. Allard	Peter D. Fuller	1 m	1:35.80	$113,040	G1
1984	Miss Oceana	Eddie Maple	Woody Stephens	Newstead Farm	1 m	1:35.80	$108,720	G1
1983	Ski Goggle	Chris McCarron	A. Thomas Doyle	Zenya Yoshida	1 m	1:35.00	$69,360	G1
1982	Cupecoy's Joy	Angel Santiago	Alfredo Callejas	Ri-Ma-Ro Stables (Robert DeFilippis) & Robert Perez	1 m	1:34.20	$51,750	G1
1981	Heavenly Cause	Laffit Pincay Jr.	Woody Stephens	Ryehill Farm (Jim & Eleanor Ryan)	1 m	1:35.20	$50,850	G1
1980	Bold 'n Determined	Ed Delahoussaye	Neil Drysdale	Saron Stable	1 m	1:36.80	$50,400	G1
1979	Davona Dale	Jorge Velásquez	John M. Veitch	Calumet Farm	1 m	1:36.00	$50,130	G1
1978	Tempest Queen	Jorge Velásquez	Lou Rondinello	Darby Dan Farm	1 m	1:35.40	$31,920	G1
1977	Bring Out The Band	Don Brumfield	James W. Murphy	Hickory Tree Stable	1 m	1:36.80	$33,690	G1
1976	Dearly Precious	Jorge Velásquez	Stephen A. DiMauro	Richard E. Bailey	1 m	1:35.80	$33,390	G1
1975	Ruffian	Jacinto Vásquez	Frank Y. Whiteley Jr.	Locust Hill Farm	1 m	1:34.40	$33,660	G1
1974-1	Chris Evert	Jorge Velásquez	Joseph A. Trovato	Carl Rosen	1 m	1:36.00	$33,960	G1
1974-2	Special Team	Miguel A. Rivera	James E. Picou	Fred W. Hooper	1 m	1:35.40	$33,960	G1
1973	Windy's Daughter	Braulio Baeza	Laz Barrera	Bernice Blackman	1 m	1:35.40	$36,540	G1
1972	Susan's Girl	Victor Tejada	John W. Russell	Fred W. Hooper	1 m	1:34.60	$33,720	
1971	Deceit	John L. Rotz	Del W. Carroll	Windfields Farm	1 m	1:36.60	$38,970	
1970-1	Royal Signal	Garth Patterson	Stephen A. DiMauro	Mary Louise Knapp Jr.	1 m	1:36.20	$36,967	
1970-2	Cathy Honey	Laffit Pincay Jr.	Evan S. Jackson	Hastings Harcourt	1 m	1:36.00	$36,967	
1969	Shuvee	Jesse Davidson	Willard C. Freeman	Anne Minor Stone	1 m	1:35.60	$38,707	
1968	Dark Mirage	Manuel Ycaza	Everett W. King	Lloyd I. Miller	1 m	1:34.80	$39,065	
1967	Furl Sail	Jacinto Vásquez	John L. Winans	Emma Louise Thomas	1 m	1:35.60	$44,330	
1966	Marking Time	Bill Shoemaker	Edward A. Neloy	Ogden Phipps	1 m	1:36.00	$38,642	
1965	Ground Control	Donald Pierce	Edward A. Neloy	Jules D. Michaels	1 m	1:37.20	$38,220	
1964	Castle Forbes	John L. Rotz	Edward A. Neloy	Wheatley Stable	1 m	1:37.00	$39,098	
1963	Spicy Living	Jimmy Combest	Jimmy Rowe	Eleonora Sears	1 m	1:37.20	$39,098	
1962	Cicada	Bill Shoemaker	Casey Hayes	Meadow Stable	1 m	1:35.60	$37,992	
1961	Bowl of Flowers	Eddie Arcaro	J. Elliott Burch	Brookmeade Stable	1 m	1:37.40	$37,537	
1960	Irish Jay	Hedley Woodhouse	James E. Fitzsimmons	Wheatley Stable	1 m	1:35.80	$38,292	
1959	Quill	Bobby Ussery	Lucien Laurin	Reginald N. Webster	1 m	1:37.40	$38,075	
1958	Big Effort	Pete D. Anderson	J. Elliott Burch	Brookmeade Stable	1 m	1:37.40	$22,952	
1957	Bayou	Bobby Ussery	Moody Jolley	Claiborne Farm	1 m	1:37.00	$26,000	
1956	Beyond (DH)	Conn McCreary	Horace A. Jones	Calumet Farm	1 m	1:37.80	$12,650	
1956	Princess Turia (DH)	Henry Moreno	Horace A. Jones	Calumet Farm	1 m	1:37.80	$12,650	
1955	High Voltage	Eddie Arcaro	James E. Fitzsimmons	Wheatley Stable	1 m	1:38.80	$22,900	
1954	Happy Mood (DH)	Pete Moreno	Monte S. Parke	Fannie Hertz	1 m	1:38.80	$10,925	
1954	Riverina (DH)	William Boland	Max Hirsch	King Ranch	1 m	1:38.80	$10,925	
1953	Secret Meeting	James Nichols	Robert L. Dotter	James Cox Brady Jr.	1 m	1:39.40	$18,450	
1952	Parading Lady	James Hardinbrook	John B. Theall	Joe W. Brown	1 m	1:38.80	$18,650	
1951-1	Kiss Me Kate	Warren Mehrtens	Oscar White	Walter M. Jeffords	1 m	1:36.40	$16,750	
1951-2	Nothirdchance	Bennie Green	Hirsch Jacobs	Isidor Bieber	1 m	1:38.80	$16,550	
1950	Siama	Ted Atkinson	Moody Jolley	Cain Hoy Stable	1 m	1:37.20	$12,600	
1949	Nell K	Douglas Dodson	John B. Partridge	Spring Hill Farm	1 m	1:38.00	$13,725	
1948	Watermill	Eddie Arcaro	Bert Mulholland	George D. Widener Jr.	1 m	1:37.00	$12,525	
1947	But Why Not	Warren Mehrtens	Max Hirsch	King Ranch	1 m	1:38.00	$14,300	
1946	Earshot	Eddie Arcaro	Willie Booth	William G. Helis Sr.	1 m	1:37.20	$9,840	
1945	Gallorette	Eddie Arcaro	Edward A. Christmas	William L. Brann	1 m	1:37.20	$9,480	
1944	Twilight Tear	Conn McCreary	Ben A. Jones	Calumet Farm	1 m	1:37.00	$10,815	
1943	Nellie L	Wendell Eads	Ben A. Jones	Calumet Farm	1 m	1:38.60	$10,650	
1942	Zaca Rosa	Charles Wahler	Frank J. Baker	William W. Crenshaw	1 m	1:38.20	$11,300	
1941	Proud One	Wendell Eads	Ben A. Jones	Calumet Farm	1 m	1:37.60	$7,275	
1940	Damaged Goods	John Gilbert	John M. Milburn	Starmount Stable (Edward Benjamin)	1 m	1:37.00	$12,025	
1939	Hostility	Leon Haas	James E. Fitzsimmons	Wheatley Stable	1 m	1:39.80	$12,100	
1938	Handcuff	Charley Kurtsinger	Hugh L. Fontaine	Brookmeade Stable	1 m	1:39.80	$10,325	
1937	Dawn Play	Lester Balaski	Max Hirsch	King Ranch	1 m	1:38.80	$10,100	
1936	Blue Sheen	James Stout	James E. Fitzsimmons	Whitney A. Stone	1 m	1:38.80	$10,600	
1935	Good Gamble	Sam Renick	Bud Stotler	Alfred G. Vanderbilt II	1 m	1:39.00	$7,325	
1934	Fleam	James Stout	James E. Fitzsimmons	Belair Stud	1 m	1:38.00	$8,575	
1933	Iseult	Hank Mills	James E. Fitzsimmons	Wheatley Stable	1 m	1:40.60	$10,650	
1932	Top Flight	Raymond Workman	Thomas J. Healey	C. V. Whitney	1 m	1:39.00	$12,850	
1931	Baba Kenney	Willie Cannon	Herbert J. Thompson	Edward R. Bradley	1 m	1:41.00	$3,375	
