= Abigail Fuller =

American racehorse trainer

Personal information
- Nationality: American
- Born: 1959 (age 66–67) Boston, Massachusetts
- Occupation: Jockey

Horse racing career
- Sport: Horse racing
- Career winnings: US$5,000,000+
- Career wins: 582

Major racing wins
- Astarita Stakes (1984); Comely Stakes (1985); Alabama Stakes (1985); Mother Goose Stakes (1985); Acorn Stakes (1985); Coaching Club American Oaks (1985); Seneca Handicap (1988)

Significant horses
- Mom's Command

Abigail Fuller (born 1959) is an American retired Thoroughbred jockey who primarily competed between the early 1980s and early 2000s. While competing in graded stakes races, Fuller won two Grade III events, one Grade II event and four Grade I events. Fuller won the majority of her graded stakes with Mom's Command between 1984 and 1985. Fuller was the 1985 Filly Triple Crown champion with her wins at the Mother Goose Stakes, Acorn Stakes and the Coaching Club American Oaks.

Other graded events that Fuller won with Mom's Command were the 1984 Astarita Stakes, the 1985 Comely Stakes and the 1985 Alabama Stakes. In 1989, Fuller won the Seneca Handicap with Fuller's Down as her last graded stakes event victory. During her career, Fuller had 582 wins while collecting over $US5 million in prize winnings.

== Early life and education ==
In 1959 or 1960, Fuller was born in Boston, Massachusetts. Growing up, Fuller undertook horseback riding training throughout her childhood and teens.

== Career ==
When Fuller was eighteen years old, Fuller become a show jumper and equestrian teacher. She then worked as a stable hand before transitioning to horse racing in November 1982. In 1983, Fuller had her first career racing victory at a Suffolk Downs event. As an apprentice jockey, Fuller remained at Suffolk Downs before moving to Oaklawn Park in early 1984. While in Arkansas, Fuller went to Keeneland, Kentucky for a single race before her apprenticeship was to end in August 1984.

Following a third-place finish at the Frizette Stakes in late 1984, Gregg McCarron took Fuller's place at the Selima Stakes. When her father could not find a jockey for the 1985 Hollywood Starlet Stakes, he chose Fuller to compete at the race. At Hollywood Starlet, Fuller finished in fifth place. During these two years, Fuller won six graded stakes races with Mom's Command ranging from Grade III to Grade I. In Grade II and Grade III events, Fuller won the 1984 Astarita Stakes and the 1985 Comely Stakes. She also had a second-place finish at the 1985 Test Stakes during the Grade II event.

At Grade I events, Fuller finished in first at the 1985 Alabama Stakes. That year, Fuller became the Filly Triple Crown champion of 1985 with Mom's Command. Her Triple Crown was achieved with her wins at the Mother Goose Stakes, Acorn Stakes and Coaching Club American Oaks. By winning these three Grade I events, Fuller became the first woman to ever win the Filly Triple Crown. With Fuller's Folly in 1988, Fuller had a Grade III win at the Seneca Handicap and a Grade III runner-up at the Niagara Handicap.

After being injured with a spinal fracture in January 1992, Fuller left horse racing in April 1992 to become a publicist at Suffolk Downs. In May 1996, Fuller returned to horse racing and began to race at Delaware Park. Following a 2002 retirement, Fuller worked in Florida as a horse trainer in the mid-2000s. In August 2011, Fuller restarted her racing career after participating in a charity horse race event earlier in the year. In November 2011, Fuller was a Grade III runner-up with Trip for A.J. at the My Charmer Handicap. After her last event in 2014, Fuller had 582 wins and over $5 million in prize winnings.

== Personal life ==
Fuller is married and has three children, one of whom is from a previous marriage.
