= Peter D. Fuller =

American auto dealer, racehorse owner, and boxer (1923–2012)

- Born: March 22, 1923; Boston, Massachusetts, U.S.
- Died: May 14, 2012 (aged 89); Portsmouth, New Hampshire, U.S.
- Education: Dartmouth, Harvard
- Occupations: Auto dealer, racehorse owner
- Known for: Owner of Dancer's Image and Mom's Command
- Spouse: Joan Beth Marcotte (m. 1951)
- Children: 8, including Abigail Fuller
- Parent(s): Viola T. and Alvan T. Fuller

Peter Davenport Fuller (March 22, 1923 – May 14, 2012) was an American auto dealer, racehorse owner, and boxer who owned Dancer's Image, the first winner in the history of the Kentucky Derby to be disqualified, and Mom's Command, 1985's American Champion Three-Year-Old Filly.

== Early life ==
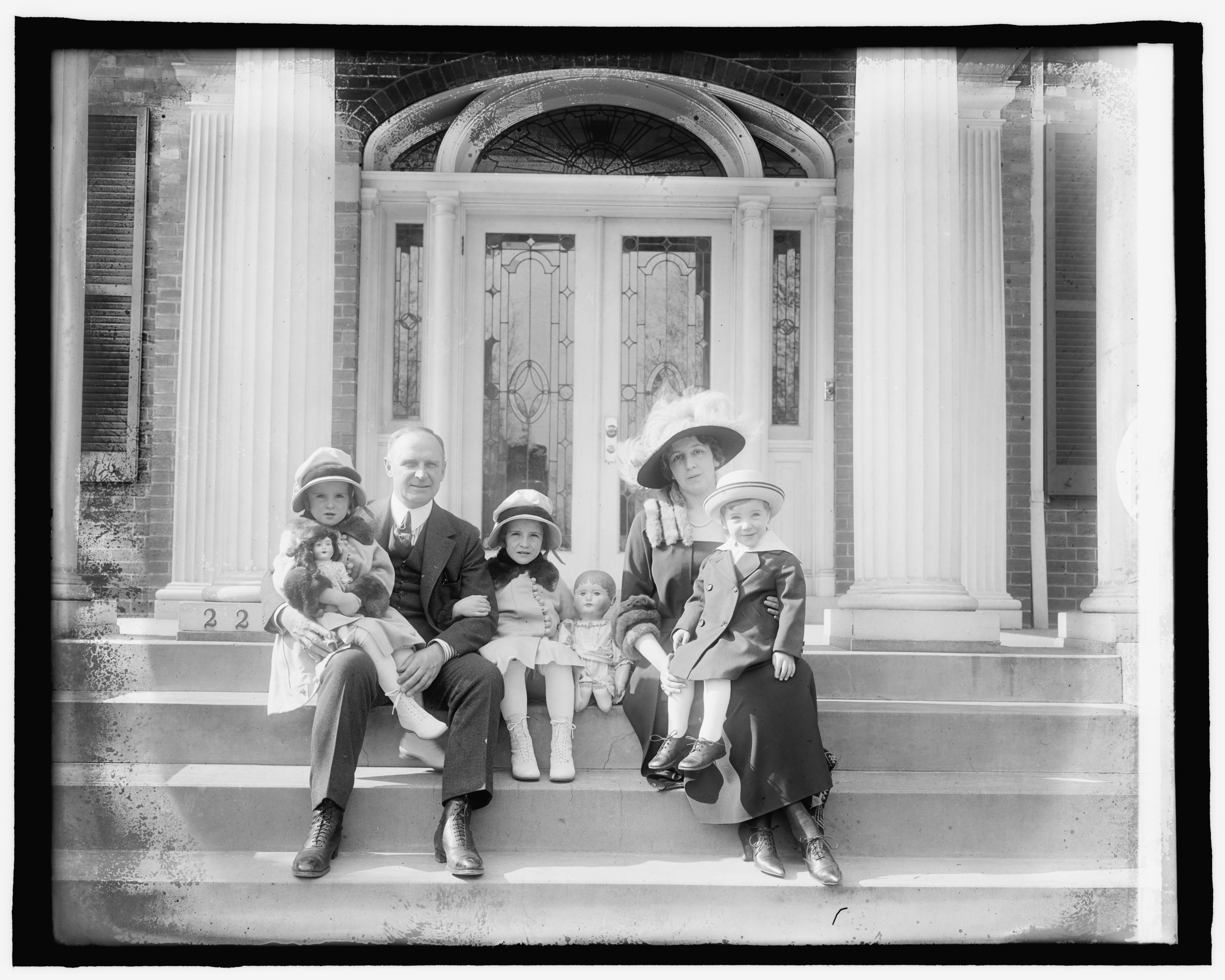
Fuller's parents and siblings in 1920

Fuller was born on March 22, 1923, in Boston to Alvan T. Fuller and the former Viola T. Davenport. The elder Fuller made a fortune as an early dealer of Packards and Cadillacs and was the Governor of Massachusetts from 1925 to 1929.

Fuller was born with an intestinal disease that stunted his physical growth and kept him out of school. He recovered at the age of 10 and began working on getting in shape. He was the Milton Academy's Outstanding Athlete of the Class of 1942. He attended Dartmouth College for military officer training and served the United States Marine Corps during World War II. He was discharged because of a weak ankle in 1944. He resumed his studies at Harvard College in 1946 and graduated in 1948. Fuller wrestled at Milton, Dartmouth College, and Harvard and won the Amateur Athletic Union (AAU) 191-pound (87 kg) New England Championship.

== Boxing ==
Fuller compiled a 50–5 record as an amateur boxer, winning 30 of his fights by knockout. He won the AAU and Golden Gloves New England heavyweight championships. In 1955, Fuller became a boxing manager. In 1957, he began managing Tom McNeeley and was in his corner for his 1961 world heavyweight title fight loss to Floyd Patterson.

== Horse racing ==
In 1951, Fuller bought his first horse, Oclirock, who ultimately won him $150,000. By 1956, he owned 16 horses. Fuller's horse Hillsborough won the 1961 Display Handicap and the 1962 Bowie Handicap.

In 1958, Fuller acquired Noor's Image for $5,000 and seven years later bred the mare to Native Dancer. The resulting offspring, Dancer's Image, was born with weak ankles and was put up for auction. However, Fuller changed his mind and purchased the horse at the auction for $26,000. After Dancer's Image won Governor's Gold Cup at Bowie Race Track, Fuller turned down $1 million for the horse. He donated the winner's purse to Coretta Scott King, widow of Martin Luther King Jr. who had been assassinated two days earlier. Believing the horse had a chance at competing in the Kentucky Derby, Fuller shipped Dancer's Image to Aqueduct Racetrack, where he won the Wood Memorial Stakes, a major prep race for the Derby.

Billboard at Runnymede Farm in North Hampton, New Hampshire, featuring Mom's Command and Dancer's Image

At the 1968 Kentucky Derby, a bad break out of the gate caused Dancer's Image to fall to last place. However, the horse was able to make a comeback and passed favorite, Forward Pass, at the eighth pole to win the race. Three days later, it was announced that Dancer's Image was disqualified after traces of phenylbutazone, a nonsteroidal anti-inflammatory drug (NSAID) commonly used to relieve inflammation of the joints were discovered in the mandatory post-race urinalysis. Forward Pass was declared the winner and Dancer's Image moved to last. Fuller contended that he had been punished for his support of civil rights and his decision to donate a winner's purse to the widow of Martin Luther King, whose demonstration against housing discrimination in Louisville had disrupted Derby events the previous year. The controversy filled the sporting news of media outlets in North America and was a cover story for Sports Illustrated, which referred to it as "the year's major sports story." Fuller took legal action and in 1970 a Kentucky Court awarded first-place money to Dancer's Image. That decision was overturned on appeal in April 1972 by the Kentucky Court of Appeals in Kentucky State Racing Comm'n v. Fuller, 481 S.W.2d 298 (Ky. 1972). Use of phenylbutazone was legalized by the Kentucky Horse Racing Commission in 1974, and by 1986 thirteen of the sixteen entrants in that year's Kentucky Derby were running on the medication.

Another of Fuller's horses, Mom's Command, won 11 of 16 races, including six graded stakes races, in her two-year career. In 1985, Mom's Command won the Mother Goose Stakes, Acorn Stakes and Coaching Club American Oaks to capture the American Triple Tiara of Thoroughbred Racing. She was ridden by Fuller's daughter Abigail Fuller, who became the first female jockey to ever win the Filly Triple Crown.

== Business career ==
In 1952, Fuller was named president of the Cadillac Automobile Company of Boston, which had the largest automobile showroom in the United States. He also ran Peter Fuller Oldsmobile in Watertown, Massachusetts, and Peter Fuller Leasing, New England Automotive Distributors, and New England Car Care Center in Stoneham, Massachusetts. In 1978, he closed his Cadillac dealership, citing high overhead at that location. Fuller's automobile dealership continues to be operated within the family. Now dealing in rentals and used vehicles, it has locations in Watertown and Waltham, Massachusetts.

== Politics ==
Fuller was expected to run as an independent in the 1974 Massachusetts gubernatorial election. He had hired a campaign staff and opened a campaign headquarters. However, on March 29, 1974, he suddenly announced his withdrawal from the race. He later revealed that he had left the race after a masked gunman jumped into Fuller's car and threatened his life and the lives of his wife and children. In the 1978 gubernatorial election, Fuller backed conservative Democrat Edward J. King over liberal Republican Francis W. Hatch Jr. and served as co-chairman of Republicans for Ed King with Lloyd B. Waring.

== Personal life ==
In 1951, Fuller married Joan Beth Marcotte of Nashua, New Hampshire. They had seven daughters and one son. He lived for many years in Brookline, Massachusetts, and at Runnymede Farm in North Hampton, New Hampshire. Fuller died of cancer on May 14, 2012, at a nursing home in Portsmouth, New Hampshire.
