= Mother Goose Stakes =

- Class: Grade II
- Location: Belmont Park; Elmont, New York, USA
- Inaugurated: 1957
- Race type: Thoroughbred – Flat racing

Race information
- Distance: 1 1/16 miles
- Surface: Dirt
- Track: left-handed
- Qualification: Three-year-old Fillies
- Weight: 124 lbs. with allowances
- Purse: $300,000

The Mother Goose Stakes is an American thoroughbred horse race for three-year-old fillies held at Belmont Park in Elmont, New York. Raced on dirt in late October, the race currently offers a purse of $300,000. Inaugurated in 1957 at a mile and a sixteenth, it was lengthened to a mile and an eighth in 1959. Originally part of the Triple Tiara of Thoroughbred Racing, the Mother Goose was removed from the series in 2010 and its distance reverted to a mile and a sixteenth.

The Mother Goose was run as a Grade II event beginning in 2017. It had been a Grade I event since 1974 (when grading was first introduced).

The race was named for H.P. Whitney's filly Mother Goose, one of only thirteen fillies to have ever won the male dominated Belmont Futurity Stakes.

The Mother Goose Stakes was run at Aqueduct Racetrack from 1963 to 1967, and again in 1969 and 1975. The race was also run at Aqueduct in 2023, 2024 and 2025 while Belmont Park was undergoing renovations.

== Records ==
Speed Record:

- 1 1/8 miles – 1:46.33 – Rachel Alexandra (2009)
- 1 1/16 miles – 1:41.01 – Off The Tracks (2016)

Largest Winning Margin:

- 19 1/4 lengths – Rachel Alexandra (2009)

Most wins by an owner:

- 3 – Eugene V. Klein (1984, 1987, 1989)

Most wins by a jockey:

- 6 – John Velazquez (1996, 2001, 2007, 2010, 2011, 2014)

Most wins by a Trainer:

- 6 – Todd A. Pletcher (1998, 2007, 2010, 2011, 2016, 2021)
- 6 – D. Wayne Lukas (1984, 1986, 1987, 1989, 1995, 2004)

== Winners ==
| Year | Winner | Jockey | Trainer | Owner | Distance | Time | Gr. |
|---|---|---|---|---|---|---|---|
| 2026 | Tap to Open | Manuel Franco | Brad H. Cox | Whisper Hill Farm | 1 1/16 | 1:41.72 | II |
| 2025 | Fully Subscribed | Flavien Prat | Chad C. Brown | Klaravich Stables | 1 1/8 | 1:49.73 | II |
| 2024 | Tarifa | Flavien Prat | Brad H. Cox | Godolphin | 1 1/8 | 1:50.78 | II |
| 2023 | Xigera | Julien Leparoux | Phillip A. Bauer | Rigney Racing | 1 1/8 | 1:48.99 | II |
| 2022 | Gerrymander | Joel Rosario | Chad C. Brown | Klaravich Stables | 1 1/16 | 1:43.74 | II |
| 2021 | Zaajel | Joel Rosario | Todd A. Pletcher | Shadwell Stable | 1 1/16 | 1:42.83 | II |
| 2020 | Race not held | | | | | | |
| 2019 | Dunbar Road | José Ortiz | Chad C. Brown | Peter M. Brant | 1 1/16 | 1:43.54 | II |
| 2018 | Midnight Bisou | Mike E. Smith | Steven M. Asmussen | Bloom Racing Stable, Madaket Stable, Allen Racing | 1 1/16 | 1:41.02 | II |
| 2017 | Unchained Melody | Joel Rosario | Brian A. Lynch | Hidden Brook Farm & Hare Forest Farm | 1 1/16 | 1:42.45 | II |
| 2016 | Off the Tracks | José Ortiz | Todd A. Pletcher | Newtown Anner Stud & J Stables | 1 1/16 | 1:41.01 | I |
| 2015 | Include Betty | Drayden Van Dyke | Thomas F. Proctor | Brereton C. Jones & Timothy C. Thornton | 1 1/16 | 1:44.68 | I |
| 2014 | Untapable | John Velazquez | Steven M. Asmussen | Ron Winchell | 1 1/16 | 1:41.48 | I |
| 2013 | Close Hatches | Joel Rosario | Bill Mott | Juddmonte Farms | 1 1/16 | 1:41.36 | I |
| 2012 | Zo Impressive | Rajiv Maragh | Thomas Albertrani | Live Oak Plantation | 1 1/16 | 1:44.05 | I |
| 2011 | Buster's Ready | John Velazquez | Todd A. Pletcher | Edward P. Evans | 1 1/16 | 1:42.44 | I |
| 2010 | Devil May Care | John Velazquez | Todd A. Pletcher | Glencrest Farm | 1 1/16 | 1:42.06 | I |
| 2009 | Rachel Alexandra | Calvin Borel | Steven M. Asmussen | Stonestreet Stables & Harold T. McCormick | 1 1/8 | 1:46:33 | I |
| 2008 | Music Note | Javier Castellano | Saeed bin Suroor | Godolphin | 1 1/8 | 1:49.75 | I |
| 2007 | Octave | John Velazquez | Todd A. Pletcher | Don Lucarelli & Starlight Stable | 1 1/8 | 1:47.19 | I |
| 2006 | Bushfire | Edgar Prado | Eddie Kenneally | Ron & Ricki Rashinski | 1 1/8 | 1:49.86 | I |
| 2005 | Smuggler | Edgar Prado | Claude R. McGaughey III | Phipps Stable | 1 1/8 | 1:48.40 | I |
| 2004 | Stellar Jayne | Robby Albarado | D. Wayne Lukas | Spendthrift Farm | 1 1/8 | 1:48.00 | I |
| 2003 | Spoken Fur | Jerry D. Bailey | Robert J. Frankel | Amerman Racing Stable | 1 1/8 | 1:50.40 | I |
| 2002 | Nonsuch Bay | Jerry D. Bailey | Frank Alexander | Joseph P. Platt Jr. | 1 1/8 | 1:49.00 | I |
| 2001 | Fleet Renee | John Velazquez | Michael Dickinson | Verne Winchell | 1 1/8 | 1:47.00 | I |
| 2000 | Secret Status | Pat Day | Neil J. Howard | W. Farish | 1 1/8 | 1:48.00 | I |
| 1999 | Dreams Gallore | Robby Albarado | Steven M. Asmussen | Gary A. Tanaka | 1 1/8 | 1:48.60 | I |
| 1998 | Jersey Girl | Mike E. Smith | Todd A. Pletcher | Ackerley Brothers Farm | 1 1/8 | 1:47.60 | I |
| 1997 | Ajina | Mike E. Smith | William I. Mott | Allen E. Paulson | 1 1/8 | 1:48.40 | I |
| 1996 | Yanks Music | John Velazquez | Leo O'Brien | Audrey H. Cooper & Michael Fennessy | 1 1/8 | 1:47.80 | I |
| 1995 | Serena's Song | Gary Stevens | D. Wayne Lukas | Robert & Beverly Lewis | 1 1/8 | 1:50.20 | I |
| 1994 | Lakeway | Kent Desormeaux | Gary F. Jones | Michael G. Rutherford | 1 1/8 | 1:46.40 | I |
| 1993 | Sky Beauty | Mike E. Smith | H. Allen Jerkens | Georgia E. Hofmann | 1 1/8 | 1:49.60 | I |
| 1992 | Turnback the Alarm | Chris Antley | William V. Terrill | Valley View Farm | 1 1/8 | 1:48.80 | I |
| 1991 | Meadow Star | Jerry D. Bailey | LeRoy Jolley | Carl Icahn | 1 1/8 | 1:48.80 | I |
| 1990 | Go For Wand | Randy Romero | William Badgett Jr. | Christiana Stable | 1 1/8 | 1:48.80 | I |
| 1989 | Open Mind | Ángel Cordero Jr. | D. Wayne Lukas | Eugene V. Klein | 1 1/8 | 1:49.40 | I |
| 1988 | Goodbye Halo | Jorge Velásquez | Charles E. Whittingham | Arthur B. Hancock III | 1 1/8 | 1:49.80 | I |
| 1987 | Fiesta Gal | Ángel Cordero Jr. | D. Wayne Lukas | Eugene V. Klein | 1 1/8 | 1:50.20 | I |
| 1986 | Life At The Top | José A. Santos | D. Wayne Lukas | Lloyd R. French Jr. | 1 1/8 | 1:49.60 | I |
| 1985 | Mom's Command | Abigail Fuller | Edward T. Allard | Peter D. Fuller | 1 1/8 | 1:49.60 | I |
| 1984 | Life's Magic | Jorge Velásquez | D. Wayne Lukas | Eugene V. Klein | 1 1/8 | 1:48.80 | I |
| 1983 | Able Money | Antonio Graell | Anthony Russo | Faith Donnelly | 1 1/8 | 1:49.20 | I |
| 1982 | Cupecoy's Joy | Angel Santiago | Alfredo Callejas | Ri-Ma-Ro Stable | 1 1/8 | 1:48.40 | I |
| 1981 | Wayward Lass | Cash Asmussen | Jose A. Martin | Flying Zee Stables | 1 1/8 | 1:48.80 | I |
| 1980 | Sugar and Spice | Jeffrey Fell | John M. Veitch | Calumet Farm | 1 1/8 | 1:49.60 | I |
| 1979 | Davona Dale | Jorge Velásquez | John M. Veitch | Calumet Farm | 1 1/8 | 1:48.80 | I |
| 1978 | Caesar's Wish | Danny Wright | Richard W. Small | Sally M. Gibson | 1 1/8 | 1:47.60 | I |
| 1977 | Road Princess | Jean Cruguet | John P. Campo | Elmendorf Farm | 1 1/8 | 1:48.20 | I |
| 1976 | Girl In Love | Jean Cruguet | John P. Campo | Elmendorf Farm | 1 1/8 | 1:48.80 | I |
| 1975 | Ruffian | Jacinto Vásquez | Frank Whiteley | Locust Hill Farm | 1 1/8 | 1:47.80 | I |
| 1974 | Chris Evert | Jorge Velásquez | Joseph A. Trovato | Carl Rosen | 1 1/8 | 1:48.60 | I |
| 1973 | Windy's Daughter | Eddie Belmonte | Laz Barrera | Mrs. Paul L. Blackman | 1 1/8 | 1:48.40 | I |
| 1972 | Wanda | Jorge Velásquez | James P. Conway | Niblick Stable | 1 1/8 | 1:48.40 | |
| 1971 | Deceit | John L. Rotz | Del W. Carroll | Windfields Farm | 1 1/8 | 1:50.20 | |
| 1970 | Office Queen | Carlos Marquez | Budd Lepman | Stephen A. Calder | 1 1/8 | 1:49.80 | |
| 1969 | Shuvee | Jesse Davidson | Willard C. Freeman | Anne Minor Stone | 1 1/8 | 1:50.20 | |
| 1968 | Dark Mirage | Manuel Ycaza | Everett W. King | Lloyd I. Miller | 1 1/8 | 1:49.40 | |
| 1967 | Furl Sail | Jacinto Vásquez | John L. Winans | Mrs. Edwin K. Thomas | 1 1/8 | 1:49.60 | |
| 1966 | Lady Pitt | Walter Blum | Stephen DiMauro | Golden Triangle Stable | 1 1/8 | 1:50.40 | |
| 1965 | Cordially | Braulio Baeza | Edward Christmas | Howell E. Jackson | 1 1/8 | 1:50.80 | |
| 1964 | Sceree | Larry Adams | Freeman McMillan | Hickory Tree Stable | 1 1/8 | 1:50.80 | |
| 1963 | Spicy Living | Jimmy Combest | Jimmy Rowe | Eleonora Sears | 1 1/8 | 1:50.40 | |
| 1962 | Cicada | Bill Shoemaker | Casey Hayes | Meadow Stable | 1 1/8 | 1:50.00 | |
| 1961 | Funloving | Bobby Ussery | Jim Fitzsimmons | Ogden Phipps | 1 1/8 | 1:50.60 | |
| 1960 | Berlo | Eric Guerin | Richard E. Handlen | Foxcatcher Farm | 1 1/8 | 1:50.00 | |
| 1959 | Quill | Paul J. Bailey | Lucien Laurin | Reginald N. Webster | 1 1/8 | 1:49.40 | |
| 1958 | Idun | Bill Hartack | Sherrill W. Ward | Josephine Bay | 1 1/16 | 1:43.60 | |
| 1957 | Outer Space | Willie Lester | James W. Maloney | Mrs. Gerard S. Smith | 1 1/16 | 1:42.60 | |
