= Peter Fuller Building =

- U.S. National Register of Historic Places
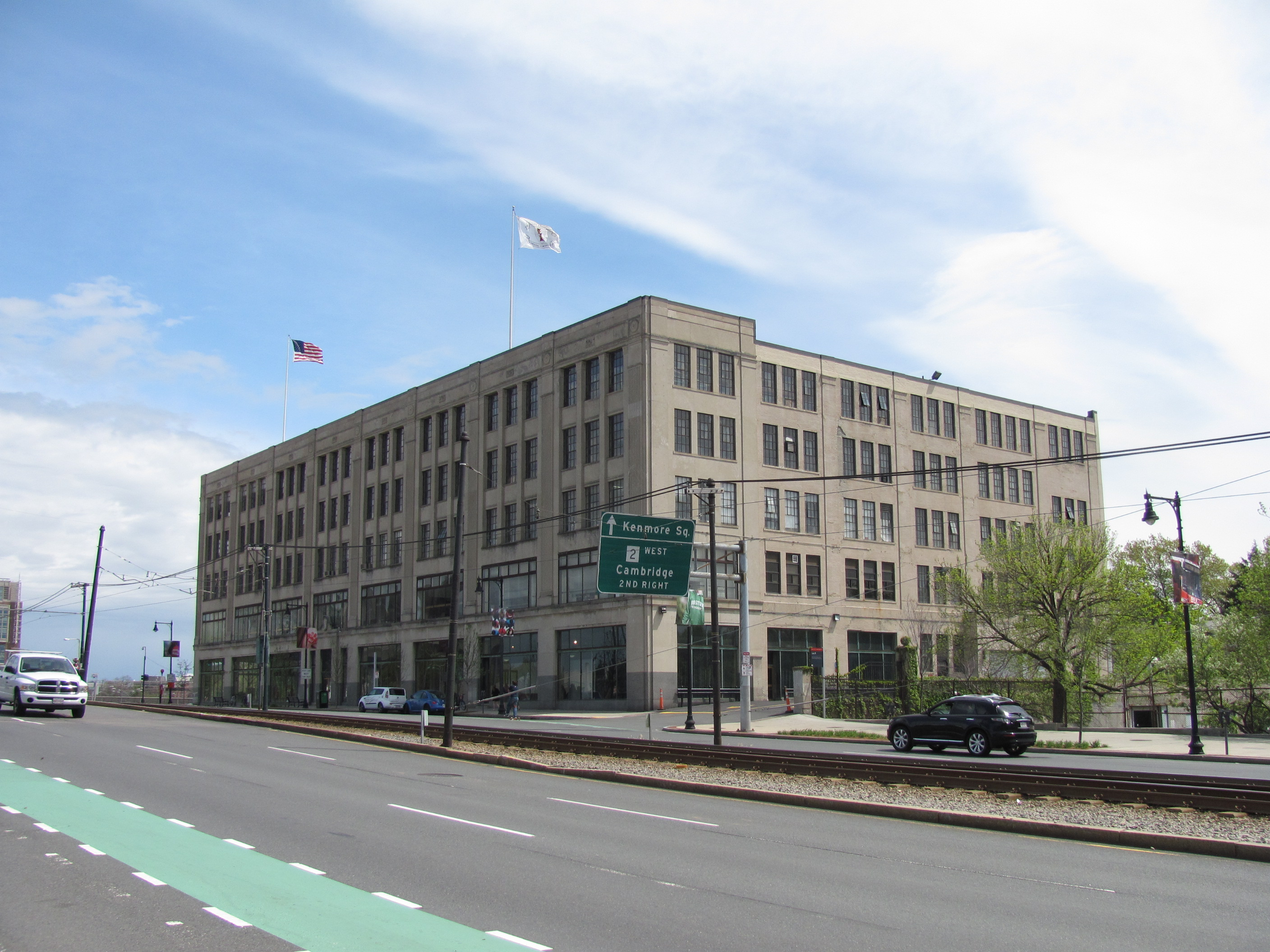
- Peter Fuller Building

- Location within Massachusetts Location within the United States
- Location: 808 Commonwealth Ave., Brookline, Massachusetts
- Coordinates: 42°21′1″N 71°6′40″W
- Built: 1927
- Architect: Kahn, Albert
- Architectural style: Classical Revival
- MPS: Brookline MRA
- NRHP reference No.: 85003269
- Added to NRHP: October 17, 1985

The Peter Fuller Building is a historic commercial building located at 808 Commonwealth Avenue in Brookline, Massachusetts.

== Description and history ==
This five-story limestone-faced building occupies a prominent position on Commonwealth Avenue near the south end of the BU Bridge. It was designed by the prolific architect Albert Kahn, a noted designer of industrial buildings, and built in 1927 for the Cadillac Auto Company. It is one of the few Boston-area buildings designed by Kahn, who did extensive work designing automobile-related industrial facilities in the American Midwest. This building stood at what was then a gateway position leading to a row of automotive dealerships along Commonwealth Avenue, and was designed to be a local flagship showroom for the luxury Cadillac line. It gets its name from Peter D. Fuller, president of the Cadillac Automobile Company of Boston. It ceased to be a car showroom in 1978, when Fuller closed his dealership, citing high overhead costs. It was purchased by Boston University (BU) the following year. In 2020, the building became home to the Howard Thurman Center, a center for student life at BU.

The building was listed on the National Register of Historic Places on October 17, 1985.

== See also ==
- National Register of Historic Places listings in Brookline, Massachusetts
