= Dark Mirage =

American-bred Thoroughbred racehorse

- Sire: Persian Road II
- Grandsire: Persian Gulf
- Dam: Home by Dark
- Damsire: Hill Prince
- Sex: Filly
- Foaled: 1965
- Country: United States
- Colour: Dark Bay
- Breeder: Duval A. Headley
- Owner: Lloyd I. Miller
- Trainer: Everett W. King
- Record: 27: 12-3-2
- Earnings: $362,789

Major wins
- Prioress Stakes (1968); La Troienne Stakes (1968); Kentucky Oaks (1968); Acorn Stakes (1968); Mother Goose Stakes (1968); Coaching Club American Oaks (1968); Monmouth Oaks (1968); Delaware Oaks (1968); Santa Maria Handicap (1969)

Awards
- 1st U.S. Filly Triple Crown Champion (1968); U.S. Champion 3-Yr-Old Filly (1968)

Honours
- United States Racing Hall of Fame (1974)
- Last updated on November 18, 2006

Dark Mirage (March 6, 1965 – July 9, 1969) was an American Hall of Fame Champion Thoroughbred racehorse.

== Racing career ==
Dark Mirage was 15.1 hands high. In her 1967 campaign as a two-year-old, she had two minor wins in fifteen starts. As a three-year-old, she lost her first race, then (en route to winning nine in a row) became the first winner of the Filly Triple Crown, capturing all three races with ease. Her handlers decided to rest her for the remainder of the racing season. Dark Mirage's performance earned her the American Champion Three-Year-Old Filly honor.

At age four, Dark Mirage raced only two times. She won her first race but, in the next, severely injured a fetlock joint. This injury ended her racing career and resulted in her death a few months later.

== Hall of fame ==
In 1974, Dark Mirage was inducted into the United States' National Museum of Racing and Hall of Fame.

== Pedigree ==
Pedigree of Dark Mirage
Sire Persian Road II	Persian Gulf	Bahram	Blandford
Sire Persian Road II	Persian Gulf	Bahram	Friar's Daughter
Sire Persian Road II	Persian Gulf	Double Life	Bachelor's Double
Sire Persian Road II	Persian Gulf	Double Life	Saint Joan
Sire Persian Road II	One For The Road	Watling Street	Fairway
Sire Persian Road II	One For The Road	Watling Street	Ranai
Sire Persian Road II	One For The Road	Sundae	Hyperion
Sire Persian Road II	One For The Road	Sundae	Bachelor's Fare
Dam Home by Dark	Hill Prince	Princequillo	Prince Rose
Dam Home by Dark	Hill Prince	Princequillo	Cosquilla
Dam Home by Dark	Hill Prince	Hildene	Bubbling Over
Dam Home by Dark	Hill Prince	Hildene	Fancy Racket
Dam Home by Dark	Sunday Evening	Eight Thirty	Pilate
Dam Home by Dark	Sunday Evening	Eight Thirty	Dinner Time
Dam Home by Dark	Sunday Evening	Drowsy	Royal Minstrel
Dam Home by Dark	Sunday Evening	Drowsy	Lazy Susan
