= American Triple Tiara of Thoroughbred Racing =

Set of horse races in the United States

The Triple Tiara of Thoroughbred Racing, formerly known as the Filly Triple Crown, is a set of three horse races in the United States which is open to three-year-old fillies. Presently, the only official Triple Tiara is the three race series in New York: the Acorn Stakes, run at Belmont Park at a distance of 1 1/16 miles (1.7 km), the Coaching Club American Oaks, run at Saratoga Race Course at a distance of 1 1/8 miles (1.8 km), and the Alabama Stakes, run at Saratoga at a distance of 1 1/4 miles (2.0 km).

== History ==
There have been attempts to develop a "Filly Triple Crown" or a Triple Tiara for fillies only, but no set series of three races consistently remained in the public eye. At least four different configurations of races have been designated as such. Two fillies won the series of the Kentucky Oaks, the Pimlico Oaks (now the Black-Eyed Susan Stakes), and the Coaching Club American Oaks, in 1949 and 1952, but the racing press did not designate either accomplishment as a "triple crown". The New York Racing Association designated three of its races as a filly triple crown of sorts, but the races so designated changed over the years. Eight fillies won variations of the NYRA Triple Tiara between 1968 and 1993.

== The New York Filly Triple Tiara (1957–2002 and 2007–2009) ==
The original Triple Tiara consisted of three races at Belmont Park: the 1 mile Acorn Stakes, the 1 1/8 miles (1.8 km) Mother Goose Stakes, and the Coaching Club American Oaks, which varied in distance between 1 1/4 and 1 1/2 miles (2.0 and 2.4 km).

Eight horses have won the series under this system:

- Dark Mirage (1968) (also won the Kentucky Oaks)
- Shuvee (1969)
- Chris Evert (1974)
- Ruffian (1975)
- Davona Dale (1979) (also won the Kentucky Oaks and the Black-Eyed Susan Stakes)
- Mom's Command (1985)
- Open Mind (1989) (also won the Kentucky Oaks)
- Sky Beauty (1993)

Four horses (Shuvee, Mom's Command, Open Mind, and Sky Beauty) have also won the Alabama Stakes in the same year. The Alabama has been part of the Triple Tiara series since 2010, and was also part of that series from 2003 through 2006.

== The New York Filly Triple Tiara (2003–2006) ==
In 2003, the Triple Tiara was reconfigured for a time to consist of the Mother Goose Stakes, Coaching Club American Oaks, and the Alabama Stakes, a 1 1/4 miles (2.0 km) race held in August at Saratoga Race Course in Saratoga Springs, New York. The New York Racing Association, the operator of Belmont Park and Saratoga Race Course, once offered a $2 million bonus to any filly that won all three races. The bonus was discontinued in 2005. In 2007, the New York Racing Association reverted to the original three races of the tiara: the Acorn, Mother Goose, and Coaching Club American Oaks. No filly swept this reconfigured series.

== The New York Filly Triple Tiara (2010–present) ==
The Triple Tiara is now a set of three horse races in New York which is open to three-year-old fillies. The three races that compose the series now are the Acorn Stakes, run at Belmont Park at a distance of 1 mile, the Coaching Club American Oaks, run at Saratoga Race Course at a distance of 1 1/8 miles (1.8 km) and the Alabama Stakes, also run at Saratoga at a distance of 1 1/4 miles (2.0 km). The current race system was implemented in 2010 by the New York Racing Association, and the series is sponsored by Betfair and TVG. No filly has swept this reconfigured series.

== National Triple Tiara proposals ==
In recent years, many owners and trainers of fillies have submitted proposals to the National Thoroughbred Racing Association to change the three races that compose the Triple Tiara. Although a great deal of prestige is attached to winning one or more of the current Triple Tiara races, all three are held in New York; because of this, the series is skewed to fillies that race in the northeast. Some from outside the area even modify the name of the series by calling it the "New York Triple Tiara".

Several options of races have been suggested to compose the "National Triple Tiara". The most popular proposal of a "National Triple Tiara" are three races that are on the undercard of the three Triple Crown races for three-year-old males. The National Triple Tiara consists of the Kentucky Oaks, run at Churchill Downs in Louisville; the George E. Mitchell Stakes, run at Pimlico Race Course in Baltimore; and the Acorn Stakes, run at Belmont Park in Elmont, New York. These three races are run on the same or similar date, and on the same racetrack, as the three races in the Triple Crown for colts.

Another proposal has been to use the Kentucky Oaks, the George E. Mitchell Stakes, and the Mother Goose Stakes. This version would allow more time for fillies to recuperate between races. Using the Mother Goose would also allow the New York Racing Association to keep the New York Triple Tiara (the Acorn Stakes, the Coaching Club American Oaks, and the Alabama Stakes) in place without interfering with the three National races.

- In 1979, Davona Dale was the only filly to have won any combination of races seriously proposed for the National Triple Tiara. She won the three National Triple Tiara races, the Kentucky Oaks, the Black-Eyed Susan Stakes (the race was renamed the George E. Mitchell Stakes in 2020), and the Acorn Stakes. She also won the Mother Goose Stakes; thereby two races in the New York Triple Tiara as well.

A prime reason for favoring the National Triple Tiara is that the Kentucky Oaks are the most popular races for fillies and draws one of the biggest crowds of any stakes races throughout the year (behind only the Kentucky Derby and the Preakness Stakes). The Kentucky Oaks consistently outdraws the Belmont Stakes, the Travers Stakes, and the Breeders' Cup series. On the other hand, the George E. Mitchell is currently only a Grade II race, as few modern trainers are willing to race their fillies with only two weeks rest after the Kentucky Oaks. However, champion filly Silverbulletday did it in 1999, proving that it is still possible.
