= Selima Stakes top three finishers =

This is a listing of the horses that finished in either first, second, or third place and the number of starters in the Selima Stakes, an American stakes race for fillies two years-old at 1-1/16 miles (8.5 furlongs) on the turf held at Laurel Park Racecourse in Laurel, Maryland. (List 1986–present)

Year	Winner	Second	Third	Starters
2020	Fluffy Sox	Invincible Gal	Tic Tic Tic Boom	8
2019	Sharing	Sunset Promise	Love Beach	7
2018	Monkeys Uncle	Shoobiedoobydoo	Helen	11
2017	Wise Gal	Madame X	Eighty Six Mets	8
2016	Happy Mesa	Harlands Thunder	Consulting	9
2015	Ruby Notion	Look Who's Talking	Holiday Wishes	9
2014	Miss Bullistic	Unhindered	Coco's Wildcat	13
2013	Aibhilin	Hot Squeeze	Pure Lady	11
2012	Mystic Love	Jewel of a Cat	Hold Our Destiny	11
2011	Softly Lit	Embracing Hearts	Good Looking Girl	8
2008	2010	Race not held		
2007	Bsharpsonata	Grace and Power	Fareena	n/a
2006	Street Sounds	Changeisgonnacome	Bitter Lemon	n/a
2005	J'Ray	Nice Nelly	Rasta Farian	n/a
2004	Hear Us Roar	Take a Check	Gotta Rush	n/a
2003	Richetta	Tattinger Rose	Spectacular Moon	n/a
2002	Makin Heat	Lets Just Do It	Heirloom Diamond	n/a
2001	Race not held			
2000	Haitian Vacation	Company Storm	Due With Two	n/a
1999	Jostle	Dawn Princess	Class	n/a
1998	Magic Broad	Petunia	Perfect Challenge	n/a
1997	Clark Street	Mercy Me	Copelan's Angel	n/a
1996	Reach the Top	Assault John	Fancy Freda	n/a
1995	River of Rum	Buckaroo Zoo	Chapter Seven	n/a
1994	Stormy Blues	Special Broad	Upper Noosh	n/a
1993	Irish Forever	Tee Kay	Makadir	n/a
1992	Booly	Foxy Ferdie	Shy Minstrel	n/a
1991	Ken de Saron	Point Spread	Froze	n/a
1990	Tycoon's Drama	Bursting Forth	Irish Linnet	n/a
1989	Sweet Roberta	Harbar	Wavering Girl	n/a
1988	Capades	Darby Shuffle	Money Movers	n/a
1987	Minstrel's Lassie	Seattle Sangue	Miss Boniface	n/a
1986	Collins	Ruling Angel	Silent Turn	n/a
1985	I'm Splendid	Silent Account	Cosmic Tiger	n/a
1984	Mom's Command	Diplomette	Soliciting	n/a
1983	Miss Oceana	Buzz My Bell	Me Darlin Anna B.	n/a
1982	Bemissed	Icy Time	No Body Else's	n/a
1981	Snow Plow	Ambassador of Luck	Chilling Thought	n/a
1980	Heavenly Cause	Rainbow Connection	Carolina Command	n/a
1979	Smart Angle	Par Excellence	Street Ballet	n/a
1978	Candy Eclair	Whisper Fleet	Drop Me a Note	n/a
1977	Lakeville Miss	L'Alezane	Eye of the Storm	n/a
1976	Sensational	Northern Sea	Debby's Turn	n/a
1975	Optimistic Gal	Artfully	Free Journey	n/a
1974	Aunt Jin	Funny Cat	Summertime Promise	n/a
1973	Dancealot	I'm a Pleasure	Talking Picture	n/a
1972	La Prevoyante	Naive	Famous Tale	n/a
1971	Numbered Account	Susceptible	Fairway Fler	n/a
1970	Patelin	Make Me Laugh	Isafloridan	n/a
1969	Predictable	Office Queen	Sweet Mist	n/a
1968	Shuvee	Process Shot	Queen's Double	n/a
1967	Syrian Sea	Gay Matelda	Singing Rain	n/a
1966	Regal Gleam	Quillo Queen	Thong	n/a
1965	Moccasin	Swift Lady	Darryll	n/a
1964	Marshua	Queen Empress	Discipline	n/a
1963	My Card	Is Ours	Enchanting	n/a
1962	Fool's Play	Gay Serenade	Smart Deb	n/a
1961	Tamarona	Broadway	Dulaturee	n/a
1960	Good Move	Times Two	Eastern Princess	n/a
1959	La Fuerza	Postward	Saecastic	n/a
1958	Rich Tradition	Toluene	Annsie Pie	n/a
1957	Guide Line	Crown	A Glitter	n/a
1956	Lebkuchen	Smoke Veil	Planchette	n/a
1955	Levee	Manihiki	Nasrina	n/a
1954	High Voltage	Myrtle's Jet	Misty	n/a
1953	Small Favor	Queen Hopeful	Clear Dawn	n/a
1952	Tritium	His Duchess	Mac Bea	n/a
1951	Rose Jet	Faberose	Knot Hole	n/a
1950	Aunt Jinny	Vulcania	Rose Fern	n/a
1949	Bed o' Roses	Striking	Busanda	n/a
1948	Gaffery	Lady Dorimar	Fond Embrace	n/a
1947	Whirl Some	Alfoxie	Miss Mommy	n/a
1946	Bee Ann Mac	Say Blue	Quarantaine	n/a
1945	Athene	Edified	Bridal Flower	n/a
1944	Busher	Gallorette	Ace Card	n/a
1943	Miss Keeneland	Twilight Tear	Whirlabout	n/a
1942	Askmenow	Good Morning	Too Timely	n/a
1941	Ficklebush	Vagrancy	Hard Baked	n/a
1940	Valdina Myth	Big Event	Moja	n/a
1939	War Beauty	Tedbriar	Miss Ferdinand	n/a
1938	Big Hurry	Inscoelda	Dinner Date	n/a
1937	Jacola	Creole Maid	Nansemond	n/a
1936	Talma Dee	Dawn Play	Peplum	n/a
1935	Split second	Beanie M.	Reminding	n/a
1934	Nellie Flag	Judy O'Grady	Blossom Again	n/a
1933	Jabot	Hindu Queen	Bazaar	n/a
1932	Notebook	Swivel	Welcome Gift	n/a
1931	Laughing Queen	Sarietta	Delicacy	n/a
1930	Tambour	Risque	Backup	n/a
1929	Khara	Galaday	Night Signal	n/a
1928	Current	Nearby	Mint Friary	n/a
1927	Bateau	Twitter	Spy Glass	n/a
1926	Fair Star	Aromagne	Saleslady	n/a
