= Dave Gorman (jockey) =

American jockey

Personal information
- Born: 1926 Elmont, New York, United States
- Died: 1987 (aged 60–61) California
- Resting place: Eternal Hills Memorial Park, Oceanside, California

Horse racing career
- Sport: Horse racing

Major racing wins
- Discovery Stakes (1948, 1949); Lamplighter Stakes (1948, 1951, 1954); Westchester Stakes (1948); Brooklyn Handicap (1949); Carter Handicap (1949); Firenze Handicap (1949, 1953); Hopeful Stakes (1949, 1953); Santa Anita Handicap (1949); Top Flight Handicap (1949); Empire City Gold Cup (1951, 1952); Empire City Handicap (1951); Jockey Club Gold Cup (1951, 1952); Lawrence Realization Stakes (1951); Peter Pan Stakes (1951); Metropolitan Handicap (1951); Cowdin Stakes (1952); Prioress Stakes (1952); Queens County Handicap (1952); San Fernando Stakes (1952); Spinaway Stakes (1952); Swift Stakes (1952); Whitney Stakes (1952); Wood Memorial Stakes (1952); Grand Union Hotel Stakes (1953); Laurel Turf Cup Stakes (1953); Test Stakes (1953); Delaware Oaks (1956); Honeymoon Handicap (1965); Native Dancer Handicap (1967) U.S. Triple Crown wins: Belmont Stakes (1951)

Significant horses
- Assault, But Why Not, Canadiana, Counterpoint, Iceberg, Kiss Me Kate, Master Fiddle, Middleground, One Count, Vulcan's Forge

David Gorman (1926–1987) was an American jockey in Thoroughbred racing born in Elmont, New York, home to Belmont Park racetrack where in 1951 he would win the most important race of his career.

In April 1942, Dave Gorman rode his first winner. In 1946, he was the first jockey to hire the inexperienced Lenny Goodman as his agent. Goodman would go on to a highly successful career, counting as clients star riders such as Braulio Baeza, Steve Cauthen, Bill Hartack, John L. Rotz, Bobby Ussery, among others.

Among Gorman's most important wins were the 1949 Santa Anita Handicap, the 1951 Metropolitan Handicap, and that year's Jockey Club Gold Cup, which he won again in 1952, as well as the Whitney Stakes and Wood Memorial Stakes in 1952.

However, it would be in the third leg of the U.S. Triple Crown in his hometown that would be the high point of his career in which he rode C.V. Whitney's Counterpoint to victory on June 16, 1951 Belmont Stakes.
