= Empire City Gold Cup =

Defunct American Thoroughbred horse race

- Class: Discontinued stakes
- Location: Belmont Park, Elmont, New York (1947-1948); Jamaica Race Course; Jamaica, New York (1949-1953)
- Inaugurated: 1947 - 1953
- Race type: Thoroughbred - Flat racing

Race information
- Distance: 1⅝ miles (13 furlongs)
- Track: Dirt, left-handed
- Qualification: Three-years-old & up
- Weight: Assigned
- Purse: $100,000 ($857,000 in 2019 - adjusted for inflation)

The Empire City Gold Cup was an American Thoroughbred horse race first run in 1947 and 1948 at Belmont Park then at Jamaica Race Course from 1949 through 1953 as a race created for horses age three and older. With its lucrative $100,000 purse, it was promoted as an international event in an effort to attract horses from Europe and South America. Run in October or early November it was contested on dirt at a distance of 1 5/8 miles which made it best suited for stayers.

== Winners and Losers ==
While a short-lived event, the Empire City Gold Cup attracted some of the best horses of the era. The inaugural race in 1947 was won by Stymie, a future U.S. Racing Hall of Fame inductee who was voted #41 on the Blood-Horse magazine List of the Top 100 U.S. Racehorses of the 20th Century. Among the seven starters were two from South America. The following year Citation came into the 1948 edition of the Empire City Gold Cup as that year's U.S. Triple Crown winner. Citation would be voted that year's U.S. Horse of the Year, become a Hall of Fame member, and be voted #3 on the Blood-Horse magazine List of the Top 100 U.S. Racehorses of the 20th Century. 1952 winner One Count would also go on to earn American Horse of the Year honors that year. In its final running on October 31, 1953, Crafty Admiral, the American Champion Older Male Horse of 1952, won by 10 Lengths.

Prominent horses beaten in the Empire City Gold Cup include: 1946 Triple Crown winner Assault, which ran third behind winner Stymie and runner-up Natchez; Christopher Chenery's Hill Prince, the 1950 American Horse of the Year and a future U.S. Racing Hall of Fame inductee, ran second to Sonny Whitney's Counterpoint in the 1951 race; and Phalanx, the 1947 American Champion Three-Year-Old Male Horse and that year's Belmont Stakes winner, was no match for Citation and finished second by two lengths.

== Records ==
Speed record:

- 2:42 3/5 @ 15/8 miles (1947)

Most wins:

- no horse won this race more than once

Most wins by a jockey:

- 2 - Eddie Arcaro (1948, 1950)
- 2 - Dave Gorman (1951, 1952)

Most wins by a trainer:

- 2 - Oscar White (1949, 1952)

Most wins by an owner:

- 2 - Sarah F. Jeffords (1949, 1952)

== Winners ==
Year	Winner	Age	Jockey	Trainer	Owner	Dist. (Miles)	Time	Purse $100,000
1953	Crafty Admiral	5	William Boland	Robert B. Odom	Charfran Stable (Charles & Frances Cohen)	15/8 M	2:43.60	$100,000
1952	One Count	3	Dave Gorman	Oscar White	Sarah F. Jeffords	15/8 M	2:44.00	$100,000
1951	Counterpoint	3	Dave Gorman	Sylvester E. Veitch	Cornelius Vanderbilt Whitney	15/8 M	2:42.80	$50,000
1950	Greek Ship	3	Eddie Arcaro	Preston M. Burch	Brookmeade Stable	15/8 M	2:43.80	$50,000
1949	Adile	3	Ted Atkinson	Oscar White	Sarah F. Jeffords	15/8 M	2:45.00	$50,000
1948	Citation	3	Eddie Arcaro	Jimmy Jones	Calumet Farm	15/8 M	2:42.80	$100,000
1947	Stymie	6	Conn McCreary	Hirsch Jacobs	Ethel D. Jacobs	15/8 M	2:42.60	$100,000
