= Selima Stakes =

- Class: Listed Stakes
- Location: Laurel Park Racecourse, Laurel, Maryland, United States
- Inaugurated: 1926
- Race type: Thoroughbred – Flat racing
- Website: www.laurelpark.com

Race information
- Distance: 5.5 furlongs
- Surface: Turf
- Track: Left-handed
- Qualification: Two-year-old fillies
- Weight: Assigned
- Purse: $150,000

The Selima Stakes is an American Thoroughbred horse race held annually at Laurel Park Racecourse in Laurel, Maryland. Raced in late November, it is open to two-year-old fillies and is raced on turf.

== History ==
Inaugurated in 1926, it is named for Selima, who was imported to Maryland in 1750 and became a foundation mare by Benjamin Tasker Jr. at the Belair Stud Farm in Prince George County. Selima was the daughter of the Godolphin Arabian, she was considered "queen of the turf", she also gained fame as one of the country's greatest broodmares in American history. Referring to the 1959 Selima Stakes, in his book Legacies of the Turf, author Edward L. Bowen says that it was "then one of the most important autumn races for juvenile fillies."

== Modern times ==
The race was run as a grade one race from 1973 through 1988. It was a grade two race in 1989 and a grade three race from 1990 through 1999. Since 2002 it has been contested over a distance of 1 1/16 miles (8.5 furlongs). The race was cancelled in 2008 for economic reasons. It was announced by Laurel Park that the famed race would be restored in 2011 and run on October 15 at 6 furlongs.

== Records ==
Speed record:

- 1 1/8 miles – 1:52.16 – Jostle (1999)
- 1 1/16 miles – 1:41.87 – J'Ray (2005)
- 1 mile – 1:38.00 – Nellie Flag (1934)
- 7 1/2 furlongs – 1:30.20 – Stormy Blues (1994)

Most wins by a trainer:

- 6 – Woody Stephens (1973, 1976, 1979, 1980, 1982, 1983)
- 4 – Max Hirsch (1935, 1946, 1959 & 1961)
- 3 – Sunny Jim Fitzsimmons (1932, 1954 & 1962)

Most wins by a jockey:

- 5 – Edgar Prado (1991, 1993, 1996, 1997 & 1998)
- 3 – Laffit Pincay Jr. (1970, 1973 & 1980)
- 3 – Eddie Arcaro (1934, 1935 & 1944)

Most wins by an owner:

- 4 – King Ranch (1935, 1946, 1959 & 1961)
- 4 – Wheatley Stable (1932, 1954, 1962 & 1969)
- 3 – Calumet Farm (1934, 1943 & 1947)

== Winners of the Selima Stakes since 1926 ==
Yr	Winner	Age	Jockey	Trainer	Owner	Dist.	Time	Purse	Gr
2020	Fluffy Sox	2	Trevor McCarthy	Chad Brown	Head of Plains Partne	1-1/16	1:50.74	$200,000	
2019	Sharing	2	Manuel Franco	H. Graham Motion	Gainesway Stable	1-1/16	1:42.61	$200,000	
2018	Monkeys Uncle	2	Daniel Centeno	Arnaud Delacour	Lael Stables	6 fur.	1:16.11	$100,000	
2017	Wise Gal	2	Steve D. Hamilton	Dove P. Houghton	Eric J Wirth	6 fur.	1:09.43	$100,000	
2016	Happy Mesa	2	Sheldon Russell	Hamilton A. Smith	Winchell Thoroughbreds	5.5 fur.	1:02.22	$100,000	
2015	Ruby Notion	2	Trevor McCarthy	Wesley A. Ward	Silverton Hill	5.5 fur.	1:05.06	$100,000	
2014	Miss Bullistic	2	Xavier Perez	Hamilton A. Smith	Kathleen Willier	5.5 fur.	1:02.94	$100,000	
2013	Aibhilin	2	Edwin Rivera	Cathal A. Lynch	Dave & Marg Wimer	5.5 fur.	1:02.25	$100,000	
2012	Mystic Love	2	Elvis Trujillo	Francis Campitelli	John Davison	5.5 fur.	1:02.23	$150,000	
2011	Softly Lit	2	Sarah Rook	Dane Kobiskie	PTK, LLC	6 fur.	1:14.83	$75,000	
2008	– 2010	Race not held							
2007	Bsharpsonata	2	Eric Camacho	Timothy Salzman	Cloverleaf Farm II	1-1/16	1:43.66	$100,000	
2006	Street Sounds	2	Ramon Domínguez	Michael Matz	Hidden Creek Farm	1-1/16	1:46.35	$100,000	
2005	J'ray	2	Jerry Bailey	Todd Pletcher	Lawrence Goichman	1-1/16	1:41.87	$125,000	
2004	Hear Us Roar	2	Stewart Elliott	Fran Campitelli	John Davison	1-1/16	1:46.24	$125,000	
2003	Richetta	2	Rick Wilson	Robin Graham	Bowman Stable	1-1/16	1:44.76	$100,000	
2002	Makin Heat	2	Mark Johnston	Jerry Robb	Michael Gill	1-1/16	1:47.60	$100,000	
2001	Race not held								
2000	Haitian Vacation	2	Rick Wilson	Eddie Kenneally	Everest Stables	1-1/8	1:53.81	$100,000	
1999	Jostle	2	Stewart Elliott	John Servis	Fox Hill Farms	1-1/8	1:52.16	$100,000	III
1998	Magic Broad	2	Edgar Prado	Richard W. Small	Robert E. Meyerhoff	1-1/8	1:52.60	$100,000	III
1997	Clark Street	2	Edgar Prado	William Badgett Jr.	Shortleaf Stable	1-1/8	1:56.00	$100,000	III
1996	Reach the Top	2	Edgar Prado	Mary E. Eppler	Samuel Rogers	1-1/8	1:52.40	$100,000	III
1995	River of Rum	2	Herb McCauley	Richard Schosberg	R. C. Halvorson	7.5 fur.	1:32.40	$100,000	III
1994	Stormy Blues	2	José A. Santos	Flint S. Schulhofer	Harriet Finkelstein	7.5 fur.	1:30.20	$100,000	III
1993	Irish Forever	2	Edgar Prado	J. William Boniface	Roger Schipke	1-1/16	1:48.40	$145,400	III
1992	Booly	2	Mike Luzzi	Vincent L. Blengs	Sy Cohen	1-1/16	1:45.20	$200,000	III
1991	Ken de Saron	2	Edgar Prado	Maurice Zilber	E.M. Fares	1-1/16	1:49.80	$200,000	III
1990	Tycoon's Drama	2	Cash Asmussen	Robert Collet	Richard C. Straus & Robert M. Aubert	1-1/16	1:44.60	$300,000	III
1989	Sweet Roberta	2	Kent Desormeaux	William I. Mott	Diana M. Firestone	1-1/16	1:46.00	$300,000	II
1988	Capades	2	Ángel Cordero Jr.	Richard O'Connell	Poma Stable	1-1/16	1:44.80	$300,000	I
1987	Minstrel's Lassie	2	Freddy Head	François Boutin	Allen E. Paulson	1-1/16	1:45.60	$250,000	I
1986	Collins	2	George Martens	Flint S. Schulhofer	Frances A. Genter	1-1/16	1:43.80	$260,000	I
1985	I'm Splendid	2	Vincent Bracciale	James J. Toner	Caesar P. Kimmel	1-1/16	1:43.00	$235,000	I
1984	Mom's Command	2	Gregg McCarron	Edward T. Allard	Peter D. Fuller	1-1/16	1:43.60	$253,000	I
1983	Miss Oceana	2	Eddie Maple	Woody Stephens	Newstead Farm	1-1/16	1:44.00	$215,000	I
1982	Bemissed	2	Frank Lovato Jr.	Woody Stephens	Ryehill Farm	1-1/16	1:44.00	$227,000	I
1981	Snow Plow	2	Jack Kaenel	Leon Blusiewicz	Joanne Blusiewicz	1-1/16	1:46.20	$210,000	I
1980	Heavenly Cause	2	Laffit Pincay Jr.	Woody Stephens	Ryehill Farm	1-1/16	1:43.40	$160,000	I
1979	Smart Angle	2	Sam Maple	Woody Stephens	Ryehill Farm	1-1/16	1:45.20	$170,000	I
1978	Candy Éclair	2	Anthony Black	S. Allen King	Adele W. Paxson	1-1/16	1:45.60	$140,000	I
1977	Lakeville Miss	2	Ruben Hernandez	Jose A. Martin	Randolph Weinsier	1-1/16	1:45.40	$125,000	I
1976	Sensational	2	Jorge Velásquez	Woody Stephens	Mill House Stable	1-1/16	1:43.80	$130,000	I
1975	Optimistic Gal	2	Darrel McHargue	LeRoy Jolley	Diana M. Firestone	1-1/16	1:42.80	$140,000	I
1974	Aunt Jin	2	Carlos Marquez	Sonny Hightower	Paul Cresci	1-1/16	1:44.00	$135,000	I
1973	Dancealot	2	Laffit Pincay Jr.	Woody Stephens	Mill House Stable	1-1/16	1:42.80	$125,000	I
1972	La Prevoyante	2	John LeBlanc	Yonnie Starr	Jean-Louis Lévesque	1-1/16	1:46.40	$125,000	I
1971	Numbered Account	2	Braulio Baeza	Roger Laurin	Ogden Phipps	1-1/16	1:44.40	$130,000	
1970	Patelin	2	Laffit Pincay Jr.	Sylvester Veitch	George Widener	1-1/16	1:45.40	$125,000	
1969	Predictable	2	Robert Ussery	Edward A. Neloy	Wheatley Stable	1-1/16	1:43.20	$125,000	
1968	Shuvee	2	Ron Turcotte	Willard C. Freeman	Anne Minor Stone	1-1/16	1:44.80	$112,500	
1967	Syrian Sea	2	Eddie Belmonte	Casey Hayes	Christopher Chenery	1-1/16	1:44.40	$112,500	
1966	Regal Gleam	2	Manuel Ycaza	Hirsch Jacobs	Patrice Jacobs	1-1/16	1:44.80	$130,500	
1965	Moccasin	2	Larry Adams	Harry Trotsek	Claiborne Farm	1-1/16	1:45.80	$100,500	
1964	Marshua	2	Wayne Chambers	Norman R. McLeod	Mrs. W. Gilroy	1-1/16	1:44.20	$100,000	
1963	My Card	2	Buck Thornburg	Oscar White	Sarah F. Jeffords	1-1/16	1:48.20	$100,000	
1962	Fool's Play	2	Johnny Sellers	Jim Fitzsimmons	Wheatley Stable	1-1/16	1:46.80	$60,000	
1961	Tamarona	2	Johnny Sellers	Max Hirsch	King Ranch	1-1/16	1:45.60	$60,000	
1960	Good Move	2	Eric Guerin	William C. Winfrey	Alfred G. Vanderbilt II	1-1/16	1:44.60	$62,000	
1959	La Fuerza	2	Sammy Boulmetis	Max Hirsch	King Ranch	1-1/16	1:47.80	$65,000	
1958	Rich Tradition	2	William Boland	Casey Hayes	Christopher Chenery	1-1/16	1:47.00	$65,000	
1957	Guide Line	2	William Boland	Charlie Whittingham	Llangollen Farm Stable	1-1/16	1:45.60	$75,000	
1956	Lebkuchen	2	Johnny Longden	MacKenzie Miller	Dr. Eslie Asbury	1-1/16	1:44.40	$80,000	
1955	Levee	2	Ray Broussard	Norman R. McLeod	Vernon G. Cardy	1-1/16	1:44.60	$85,000	
1954	High Voltage	2	Ray Broussard	Jim Fitzsimmons	Wheatley Stable	1-1/16	1:45.00	$90,000	
1953	Small Favor	2	Pete McLean	Sylvester Veitch	C. V. Whitney	1-1/16	1:46.40	$75,000	
1952	Tritium	2	Ronnie Nash	Preston M. Burch	Brookmeade Stable	1-1/16	1:46.80	$75,000	
1951	Rose Jet	2	Eric Guerin	William M. Booth	Maine Chance Farm	1-1/16	1:47.00	$64,000	
1950	Aunt Jinny	2	Nick Wall	Duval A. Headley	Duval A. Headley	1-1/16	1:46.40	$62,000	
1949	Bed O' Roses	2	Eric Guerin	William C. Winfrey	Sagamore Farm	1-1/16	1:45.80	$70,000	
1948	Gaffery	2	Carson Kirk	Richard E. Handlen	William duPont Jr.	1-1/16	1:46.00	$70,000	
1947	Whirl Some	2	Douglas Dodson	Horace A. Jones	Calumet Farm	1-1/16	1:46.40	$70,000	
1946	Bee Ann Mac	2	Abelardo DeLara	Max Hirsch	King Ranch	1-1/16	1:50.00	$70,000	
1945	Athene	2	Warren Mehrtens	William J. Hirsch	Edward Lasker	1-1/16	1:47.40	$56,500	
1944	Busher	2	Eddie Arcaro	James W. Smith	Edward R. Bradley	1-1/16	1:49.60	$45,000	
1943	Miss Keeneland	2	Fred A. Smith	Ben A. Jones	Calumet Farm	1-1/16	1:48.40	$35,000	
1942	Askmenow	2	Carroll Bierman	Kenneth Osborne	Hal Price Headley	1-1/16	1:46.80	$36,500	
1941	Ficklebush	2	Kenneth McCombs	Richard E. Handlen	William duPont Jr.	1-1/16	1:47.20	$42,000	
1940	Valdina Myth	2	Harry Richards	John J. Flanigan	Emer. Woodward	1 mile	1:41.40	$40,000	
1939	War Beauty	2	Alfred Robertson	J. Oliver Keene	J. Oliver Keene	1 mile	1:41.80	$44,000	
1938	Big Hurry	2	Fred A. Smith	William A. Hurley	Edward R. Bradley	1 mile	1:41.00	$43,000	
1937	Jacola	2	Wayne Wright	Selby L. Burch	Nancy Carr Friendly	1 mile	1:41.80	$40,700	
1936	Talma Dee	2	Alfred Robertson	Robert V. McGarvey	Milky Way Farms	1 mile	1:39.40	$37,500	
1935	Split Second	2	Eddie Arcaro	Max Hirsch	King Ranch	1 mile	1:39.60	$34,500	
1934	Nellie Flag	2	Eddie Arcaro	Burton B. Williams	Calumet Farm	1 mile	1:38.00	$37,250	
1933	Jabot	2	Charles Kurtsinger	Thomas J. Healey	C. V. Whitney	1 mile	1:40.00	$37,250	
1932	Notebook	2	Hank Mills	Jim Fitzsimmons	Wheatley Stable	1 mile	1:40.60	$39,750	
1931	Laughing Queen	2	John Bejshak	Bud Stotler	William R. Coe	1 mile	1:41.00	$39,000	
1930	Tambour	2	Louis Schaeffer	Preston M. Burch	Preston M. Burch	1 mile	1:39.80	$43,500	
1929	Khara	2	Laverne Fator	John Lowe	Rancocas Stable	1 mile	1:39.40	$41,250	
1928	Current	2	Earl Pool	Jack Baker	Robert S. Clark	1 mile	1:40.60	$37,250	
1927	Bateau	2	Eddie Ambrose	Scott P. Harlan	Walter M. Jeffords Sr.	1 mile	1:39.20	$40,000	
1926	Fair Star	2	Ovila Bourassa	Carl Utz	William duPont Jr.	1 mile	1:40.00	$39,000	

== See also ==
- Selima Stakes top three finishers

== Bibliography ==
- The Selima Stakes at Pedigree Query
