= Jacola =

American-bred Thoroughbred racehorse

- Sire: Jacopo
- Grandsire: Sansovino
- Dam: La France
- Damsire: Sir Gallahad
- Sex: Filly
- Foaled: 1935
- Died: 1959 (aged 23–24)
- Country: United States
- Colour: Bay
- Breeder: Arthur B. Hancock
- Owner: Nancy Carr Friendly
- Trainer: Selby L. Burch
- Record: 25: 11-5-4
- Earnings: US$70,060

Major wins
- Selima Stakes (1937); Washington Handicap (1938); Maryland Handicap (1938); Laurel Stakes (1938); Victorian Handicap (1939)

Awards
- American Champion Two-Year-Old Filly (1937)

Jacola (1935–1959) was an American Champion Thoroughbred racehorse. Bred by Arthur B. Hancock, she was sired by the British import Jacopo, a son of the 1924 Epsom Derby winner, Sansovino. Jacola was out of the mare La France, a daughter of Sir Gallahad, who was the leading sire in North America in 1930, 1933, 1934, and 1940 and who sired 1930 U.S. Triple Crown winner Gallant Fox. A year following Jacola's birth, La France foaled U.S. Racing Hall of Fame inductee Johnstown, winner of the 1939 Kentucky Derby and Belmont Stakes.

Purchased by Edward Friendly of Warrenton, Virginia, and raced under his wife's name, Jacola was conditioned by Selby Burch, brother to trainer Preston Burch, sons of U.S. Racing Hall of Fame inductee William P. Burch.

Racing at age two in 1937, Jacola notably won the Selima Stakes and ran second against males in the Pimlico Futurity. In year-end balloting, shea edged out Wheatley Stable's Merry Lassie for American Champion Two-Year-Old Filly honors. At age three, Jacola continued to be one of the top fillies racing in the United States and kept winning against male horses. In October 1938, she beat older males three straight times in the one month. She won the Maryland Handicap and Washington Handicap, and, under jockey Nick Wall, set a new Laurel Park Racecourse record for one mile of 1:37.00 while beating the great Seabiscuit by two lengths in the Laurel Stakes.

Wintered at training facilities in Columbia, South Carolina, in February 1939 Jacola was sent to compete in California, where her best result was a third to Cravat in the March running of the San Juan Capistrano Handicap at Santa Anita Park. The January 18, 193, issue of the Los Angeles Times refers to her as the" champion 3-year-old mare of 1938" and the newspaper repeats that in its ensuing February 5 and 26 editions. Back on the East Coast of the United States, Jacola won the 1939 Victorian Handicap at the Jamaica Racetrack in Queens, New York.

== Breeding record ==
Jacola produced two foals by 1943 U.S. Triple Crown winner Count Fleet, but her best foal was a colt named Phalanx, who was sired by Pilate. Phalanx won the 1947Belmont Stakes and was voted American Champion 3-Year-Old Colt.
