= Shuvee =

American-bred Thoroughbred racehorse

- Sire: Nashua
- Grandsire: Nasrullah
- Dam: Levee
- Damsire: Hill Prince
- Sex: Mare
- Foaled: 1966
- Country: United States
- Colour: Chestnut
- Breeder: Whitney A. Stone
- Owner: Anne Minor Stone
- Trainer: Willard C. Freeman
- Record: 44: 16-10-6
- Earnings: $890,445

Major wins
- Frizette Stakes (1968); Selima Stakes (1968); Coaching Club American Oaks (1969); Mother Goose Stakes (1969); Acorn Stakes (1969); Alabama Stakes (1969); Cotillion Handicap (1969); Ladies Handicap (1969); Beldame Stakes (1970); Diana Handicap (1970, 1971); Top Flight Handicap (1970, 1971); Jockey Club Gold Cup (1970, 1971)

Awards
- U.S. Filly Triple Crown Champion (1969); U.S. Champion Older Mare (1970 & 1971)

Honours
- United States Racing Hall of Fame (1975); Aiken Thoroughbred Racing Hall of Fame (1977) #70 - Top 100 U.S. Racehorses of the 20th Century; Shuvee Handicap at Belmont Park
- Last updated on November 23, 2007

Shuvee (January 22, 1966 – April 1, 1986) was an American Thoroughbred Champion Hall of Fame racehorse.

== Background ==
Shuvee was a chestnut mare bred in Virginia by Whitney A. Stone. She was sired by 1955 Horse of the Year Nashua out of the 1956 Coaching Club American Oaks winner Levee.

== Racing career ==
Shuvee was the second filly to ever win the U.S. Filly Triple Crown.

In addition to winning the Triple Tiara, in 1970 Shuvee became the only filly to ever defeat colts in the two-mile-long Jockey Club Gold Cup. Future Hall of Fame jockey Ron Turcotte (and 1973 Triple Crown winner aboard Secretariat) guided her to a seven-length repeat victory in that race in 1971.

== Breeding record ==
As a broodmare, she had only modest success.

== Honors ==
Shuvee was named American Champion Older Female Horse in 1970 and 1971.

In 1975, Shuvee was inducted into the National Museum of Racing and Hall of Fame, where her portrait by equine artist Richard Stone Reeves can be seen in the museum's collection. On its creation in 1977, she was voted into the Aiken Thoroughbred Racing Hall of Fame and Museum.

== Pedigree ==
Pedigree of Shuvee
Sire Nashua	Nasrullah	Nearco	Pharos
Sire Nashua	Nasrullah	Nearco	Nogara
Sire Nashua	Nasrullah	Mumtaz Begum	Blenheim
Sire Nashua	Nasrullah	Mumtaz Begum	Mumtaz Mahal
Sire Nashua	Segula	Johnstown	Jamestown
Sire Nashua	Segula	Johnstown	La France
Sire Nashua	Segula	Sekhmet	Sardanapale
Sire Nashua	Segula	Sekhmet	Prosopopee
Dam Levee	Hill Prince	Princequillo	Prince Rose
Dam Levee	Hill Prince	Princequillo	Cosquilla
Dam Levee	Hill Prince	Hildene	Bubbling Over
Dam Levee	Hill Prince	Hildene	Fancy Racquet
Dam Levee	Bourtai	Stimulus	Ultimus
Dam Levee	Bourtai	Stimulus	Hurakan
Dam Levee	Bourtai	Escutcheon	Sir Gallahad
Dam Levee	Bourtai	Escutcheon	Affection
