= Pavot =

American-bred Thoroughbred racehorse

- Sire: Case Ace
- Grandsire: Teddy
- Dam: Coquelicot
- Damsire: Man o' War
- Sex: Stallion
- Foaled: 1942
- Country: United States
- Colour: Brown
- Breeder: Walter M. Jeffords Sr.
- Owner: Walter M. Jeffords Sr.
- Trainer: Oscar White
- Record: 32: 14-6-2
- Earnings: US$373,365

Major wins
- Grand Union Hotel Stakes (1944); Mayflower Stakes (1944); United States Hotel Stakes (1944); Christiana Stakes (1944); Saratoga Special Stakes (1944); Hopeful Stakes (1944); Belmont Futurity Stakes (1944); Choptank Purse (1946); Sussex Handicap (1946); Massachusetts Handicap (1946); Wilson Stakes (1946); Jockey Club Gold Cup (1946) American Classic Race wins: Belmont Stakes (1945)

Awards
- American Champion Two-Year-Old Colt (1944)

Pavot (January 27, 1942 - June 5, 1975) was an American Thoroughbred Champion racehorse. In a career that lasted from 1944 to 1946 he ran thirty-two times and won fourteen races. He was the leader of his generation in 1944 when he was named American Champion Two-Year-Old Colt. The following year he recorded his most important win in the Belmont Stakes.

== Background ==
Bred and raced by Walter M. Jeffords Sr., he was sired by Case Ace, a successful runner at sprint race distances. His dam was Coquelicot who was a daughter of Man o' War. He was trained by Oscar White.

== Racing career ==
=== 1944: two-year-old season ===
Pavot was undefeated in eight starts as a two-year-old in 1944. He was ridden by U.S. Racing Hall of Fame jockey George Woolf in six of those wins including for his most important races including the Saratoga Special Stakes in which he set a stakes record time that stood for the next thirty-one years. Pavot finished racing early that year with earnings totalling US$180,350 after his resounding win in the September 30th Belmont Futurity from which he emerged with a badly cut hoof that kept him out of racing until June of the following year.

=== 1945: three-year-old season ===
In late April 1945, Pavot was being made ready to run in the Kentucky Derby, delayed that year by a month due to government imposed wartime restrictions. However, he stepped on a pin which interrupted his race conditioning and as a result only made his first start as a three-year-old on June 6, 1945. After more than an eight-month absence from racing, the colt suffered the first loss of his career when he finished second by a nose to Polynesian in the Withers Mile at Belmont Park.

Not entered in the mile and a quarter Kentucky Derby, on June 16 Pavot was sent to Baltimore's Pimlico Race Course to prepare for the 55th running of the Preakness Stakes. The colt showed he could handle the 1 3/16 miles Preakness distance with a workout of that length in 1:59 1/5. However, in the race, under jockey George Woolf he finished fifth to winner Polynesian.

Shipped to Elmont, New York for the mile and a half Belmont Stakes, Pavot was ridden by Eddie Arcaro who guided him to a five-length win of the third and longest leg of the Triple Crown series. In his next outing, Pavot finished last in the July 15 Dwyer Stakes and was fourth in the August 11 Travers Stakes, run that year at Belmont Park.

The Belmont Stakes would be Pavot's only major win of 1945 but in addition to the runner-up in the Withers Mile, he also earned seconds in both the Whitney Handicap and the Empire City Handicap

=== 1946: four-year-old season ===
On April 25, Pavot made his first start of 1946, winning the Choptank Purse at Havre de Grace Racetrack in Maryland. In mid June, he won the Sussex Handicap at Delaware Park Racetrack, defeating future Hall of Fame inductees, Stymie and Gallorette. and on July 6 captured the Massachusetts Handicap at Suffolk Downs in Boston.

In early August Pavot won the Wilson Stakes and in the September 14 Narragansett Special he ran second to Lucky Draw in a World Record time of 1:54 3/5 for 1 3/16 miles on dirt. Eleven days later, Pavot was second again, this time to Stymie in the Manhattan Handicap at Belmont Park. In his last win of the year, on October 5 Pavot won the gruelling two-mile Jockey Club Gold Cup at Belmont Park.

== Stud record ==
Pavot was retired to stand at stud at his owner's Faraway Farm on Huffman Mill Pike in Lexington, Kentucky. As a sire, Pavot's progeny met with modest success in racing. Through his daughter, Ophelia Rose, Pavot is the damsire of the 1962 American Grand National Steeplechase winner and Steeplechase Horse of the Year, Barnaby's Bluff, the 1963 American Grand National winner, Tuscarora, plus Hollywood Gold Cup winner, Dotted Swiss.

== Pedigree ==
Pedigree of Pavot, brown stallion, 1942
Sire Case Ace	Teddy	Ajax	Flying Fox
Sire Case Ace	Teddy	Ajax	Amie
Sire Case Ace	Teddy	Rondeau	Bay Ronald
Sire Case Ace	Teddy	Rondeau	Doremi
Sire Case Ace	Sweetheart	Ultimus	Commando
Sire Case Ace	Sweetheart	Ultimus	Running Stream
Sire Case Ace	Sweetheart	Humanity	Voter
Sire Case Ace	Sweetheart	Humanity	Red Cross
Dam Coquelicot	Man o' War	Fair Play	Hastings
Dam Coquelicot	Man o' War	Fair Play	Fairy Gold
Dam Coquelicot	Man o' War	Mahubah	Rock Sand
Dam Coquelicot	Man o' War	Mahubah	Merry Token
Dam Coquelicot	Fleur	Pennant	Peter Pan
Dam Coquelicot	Fleur	Pennant	Royal Rose
Dam Coquelicot	Fleur	Forsythia	Broomstick
Dam Coquelicot	Fleur	Forsythia	Inaugural (family: 10-a)
