= Natchez (horse) =

American-bred Thoroughbred racehorse

- Sire: Jamestown
- Grandsire: St. James
- Dam: Creole Maid
- Damsire: Pharamond
- Sex: Stallion
- Foaled: 1943
- Country: United States
- Colour: Chestnut
- Breeder: Walter M. Jeffords, Sr.
- Owner: Sarah F. Jeffords
- Trainer: Oscar White
- Record: 29: 7-7-3
- Earnings: US$166,845

Major wins
- Travers Stakes (1946); Kent Stakes (1946); Harford Handicap (1947); Edward Burke Handicap (1947); Havre de Grace Handicap (1948) American Classic Races: 2nd: Belmont Stakes (1946)

Natchez (1943–1952) was an American Thoroughbred racehorse who set two track records and equaled another. He was bred by Walter M. Jeffords, Sr. and raced by his wife, Sarah.

== Racing career ==
At age three, under trainer Oscar White, Natchez did not run in the Kentucky Derby but did compete in the second leg of the U.S. Triple Crown series, finishing sixth in the Preakness Stakes. He then finished second in the mile and a half Belmont Stakes before going on to win the prestigious Travers Stakes.

During each of his three years of racing between 1946 and 1948, Natchez equaled or set a track record. On June 8, 1946, he won the Kent Stakes at Delaware Park Racetrack, tying the track record of 1:42 3/5 for 1 1/16 miles on dirt. On April 20, 1947, he set a new track record at Havre de Grace Racetrack of 1:42 3/5 for 1 1/16 miles on dirt in winning the Edward Burke Handicap. He broke another Havre de Grace track record on July 17, 1948, for 1 1/8 miles on dirt with a time of 1:49 2/5 in winning the Havre de Grace Handicap.

== Stud record ==
Retired from racing, Natchez stood at stud for the 1949 and 1950 seasons but died unexpectedly from colic before the start of the 1952 breeding season. Among his limited offspring, Natchez sired the outstanding runner Bobby Brocato, a winner of a number of top races including the Santa Anita, San Juan Capistrano and Carter Handicaps, plus the Tanforan Handicap twice.

== Pedigree ==
Pedigree of Natchez, chestnut stallion, 1943
Sire Jamestown B. 1928	St James; B. 1921	Ambassador (GB); Br. 1911	Dark Ronald (IRE)
Sire Jamestown B. 1928	St James; B. 1921	Ambassador (GB); Br. 1911	Excellenza (GB)
Sire Jamestown B. 1928	St James; B. 1921	Bobolink (GB); B. 1913	Willonyx (GB)
Sire Jamestown B. 1928	St James; B. 1921	Bobolink (GB); B. 1913	Chelandry (GB)
Sire Jamestown B. 1928	Mlle. Dazie; B. 1917	Fair Play*; Ch. 1905	Hastings*
Sire Jamestown B. 1928	Mlle. Dazie; B. 1917	Fair Play*; Ch. 1905	Fairy Gold (GB)*
Sire Jamestown B. 1928	Mlle. Dazie; B. 1917	Toggery; B. 1909	Rock Sand (GB)*
Sire Jamestown B. 1928	Mlle. Dazie; B. 1917	Toggery; B. 1909	Tea's Over
Dam Creole Maid Br. 1935	Pharamond (GB); Br. 1925	Phalaris (GB); Br. 1913	Polymelus (GB)
Dam Creole Maid Br. 1935	Pharamond (GB); Br. 1925	Phalaris (GB); Br. 1913	Bromus (GB)*
Dam Creole Maid Br. 1935	Pharamond (GB); Br. 1925	Selene (GB); B. 1919	Chaucer (GB)
Dam Creole Maid Br. 1935	Pharamond (GB); Br. 1925	Selene (GB); B. 1919	Serenissima (GB)
Dam Creole Maid Br. 1935	Baton Rouge; Br. 1927	Man o' War; Ch. 1917	Fair Play*
Dam Creole Maid Br. 1935	Baton Rouge; Br. 1927	Man o' War; Ch. 1917	Mahubah*
Dam Creole Maid Br. 1935	Baton Rouge; Br. 1927	Baton; Br. 1921	Hainault (GB)*
Dam Creole Maid Br. 1935	Baton Rouge; Br. 1927	Baton; Br. 1921	Batanoea (IRE)

* Natchez is inbred 3S x 4D to the stallion Fair Play, meaning that he appears third generation on the sire side of his pedigree, and fourth generation on the dam side of his pedigree.

* Natchez is inbred 4S x 5D to the stallion Rock Sand, meaning that he appears fourth generation on the sire side of his pedigree, and fifth generation (via Mahubah) on the dam side of his pedigree.

* Natchez is inbred 4D x 5D to the mare Bronus, meaning that she appears fourth generartion and fifth generation (via Hainault) on the dam side of his pedigree.
