= Marshua Stakes =

American Thoroughbred horse race

- Class: Ungraded Stakes
- Location: Laurel Park Racecourse, Laurel, Maryland, United States
- Inaugurated: 1987
- Race type: Thoroughbred - Flat racing
- Website: www.laurelpark.com

Race information
- Distance: 6 furlongs
- Surface: Dirt
- Track: left-handed
- Qualification: Fillies; Three-years-old
- Weight: Assigned
- Purse: $100,000

The Marshua Stakes is an American Thoroughbred horse race held annually in February at Laurel Park Racecourse in Laurel, Maryland. The race is open to three-year-old fillies and is run at six furlongs on the dirt.

An ungraded stakes race, it offers a purse of $100,000. The race was named in honor of the great race mare Marshua in 1987. Marshua was foaled in 1962 and was an American Thoroughbred racehorse sired by Nashua out of Emardee, by Heliopolis. Marshua was ranked second in her class of two-year-olds. She made 16 starts in 1964 and was in the money 15 times, or 94% of the time. The highlight of that season was her victory in the prestigious Selima Stakes at Laurel Park Racecorse in Maryland. Having led all the way around the 1 1/16 mile event, she battled Queen Empress through the stretch to win by a fading neck. Queen Empress was later named champion two-year-old filly. In addition to the Selima, Marshua won the Schuylerville Stakes, the Gardenia Stakes and the Marguerite Stakes in her freshman year.

Marshua was bred and owned by Mrs. Wallace Gilroy. At age three, she placed second in the Acorn Stakes and won the filly classic Coaching Club American Oaks. She retired with a record of nine wins, six seconds and four thirds in 21 starts with career earnings of $317,599.

== Records ==
Speed record:

- 6 furlongs - 1:09.36 - Gator Prowl (2010)
- 7 furlongs - 1:24.60 - Mary's Silver Pen (2000)

Most wins by a horse:

- No horse has ever won the Marshua Stakes more than once.

Most wins by an owner:

- No owner has ever won the Marshua Stakes more than once.

Most wins by a jockey:

- 3 - Jeremy Rose (2007, 2008 & 2009)
- 3 - Mario Pino (1994, 2000 & 2004)

Most wins by a trainer:

- 2 - Dale Capuano (2005 & 2006)
- 2 - Edmund D. Gaudet (1990 & 2007)

== Winners of the Marshua Stakes since 1987 ==
Year	Winner	Age	Jockey	Trainer	Owner	Distance	Time	Purse	Grade
2018	Limited View	3	Edgar Prado	John Salzman, Jr.	John Salzman, Jr.	6 fur.	1:10.99	$100,000	
2017	Star Super	3	Trevor McCarthy	Cathal A. Lynch	Equine Prep	6 fur.	1:11.30	$100,000	
2016	Karen's Silk	3	Jevian Toledo	Michael N. Dilger	GRD Two Racing	6 fur.	1:12.53	$75,000	
2015	Lindisfarne	3	Victor Carrasco	Rudy Rodriguez	KMN Racing	6 fur.	1:11.40	$100,000	
2014	Gracer	3	Alex Cintron	Anthony Dutrow	Three Chimneys Racing	6 fur.	1:12.18	$100,000	
2013	No Race	-	No Race	No Race	No Race	no race	0:00.00	no race	
2012	Dance to Bristol	3	Elias Peltrouche	Ollie Figgins, III	Cooperville Farm	6 fur.	1:13.40	$75,000	
2011	Red's Round Table	3	Sheldon Russell	Timothy L. Keefe	Arnold A. Heft	6 fur.	1:13.40	$75,000	
2010	Gator Prowl	3	Harry Vega	John E. Salzman	Danny Divver	6 fur.	1:09.36	$60,000	
2009	Strut the Canary	3	Jeremy Rose	Timothy Tullock, Jr.	Everest Stables, Inc.	6 fur.	1:10.72	$70,000	
2008	Throbbin' Heart	3	Jeremy Rose	Steve Asmussen	Zayat Stables, LLC	6 fur.	1:11.00	$50,000	
2007	Laila's Punch	3	Jeremy Rose	Edmund D. Gaudet	Morris Bailey	5.5 fur.	1:06.00	$90,000	
2006	Celestial Legend	3	Erick Rodriguez	Dale Capuano	R. Shultz/D. Menard	5.5 fur.	1:04.00	$75,000	
2005	Rush to Glory	3	Mike Hole	Dale Capuano	L. T. Smith Enterprises	6 fur.	1:12.40	$50,000	
2004	Among My Souvenirs	3	Mario Pino	Anthony W. Dutrow	Peter G. Angelos	6 fur.	1:11.20	$40,000	
2003	Ladyecho	3	Oscar Castillo	John C. Servis	Charlotte C. Polin	6 fur.	1:10.20	$50,000	
2002	Two Times a Lady	3	Omar Klinger	Francis Campitelli	James McCaul	6 fur.	1:11.60	$40,000	
2001	No Race	-	No Race	No Race	No Race	no race	0:00.00	no race	
2000	Mary's Silver Pen	3	Mario Pino	Guadalupe Preciado	Rancho Grande Farms	7 fur.	1:24.60	$55,000	
1999	Potomac Bend	3	Mark T. Johnston	Vincent L. Blengs	Wayne Harrison	6 fur.	1:11.40	$55,000	
1998	Chasseresse	3	Edgar Prado	Glenda J. Gilday	Leverett S. Miller	6 fur.	1:11.60	$55,000	
1997	Meteor Cap	3	Victor H. Molina	Eugene Weymouth	Buckland Farm	6 fur.	1:12.00	$55,000	
1996	Secret Prospect	3	Carlos Marquez	John J. Tammaro III	Alan Kline Revoc.Trust	7 fur.	1:25.20	$55,000	
1995	White Cliffs	3	Rick Wilson	Carlos A. Garcia	Carol Ann Kaye	6 fur.	1:11.60	$55,000	
1994	Pleasant Dilema	3	Mario Pino	Edward T. Allard	Gilbert G. Campbell	6 fur.	1:11.40	$55,000	
1993	Carnirainbow	3	Greg Hutton	John J. Robb	Hal C. B. Clagett	6 fur.	1:13.60	$45,000	
1992	Luramore	3	Rick Wilson	Ben W. Perkins, Jr.	Wright/Legum/Keelty	6 fur.	1:12.80	$45,000	
1991	Picnic Island	3	Joe Rocco	Charles Peoples	Bayard Sharp	6 fur.	1:13.40	$45,000	
1990	Leery Baba	3	Mike Luzzi	Edmund D. Gaudet	Brian Hurst	6 fur.	1:12.00	$45,000	
1989	All About Style	3	Kent Desormeaux	Bernard P. Bond	Arnold A. Heft	7 fur.	1:24.80	$55,000	
1988	Willa On the Move	3	James Edwards	Leon Blusiewicz	Lorraine Quinichett	6.5 fur.	1:18.40	$50,000	
1987	Cagey Exuberance	3	Jake Nied	H. Graham Motion	Lindsey Burbank	6 fur.	1:14.60	$50,000	

== See also ==
- Marshua Stakes top three finishers
- Laurel Park Racecourse
