= Edward L. Bowen =

American sportswriter (1942–2025)

Edward Bowen
- Born: December 23, 1942; Welch, West Virginia, U.S.
- Died: January 20, 2025 (aged 82); Versailles, Kentucky, U.S.
- Education: University of Florida; University of Kentucky

Edward Louis Bowen (December 23, 1942 – January 20, 2025) was an American Thoroughbred horse racing historian and author, and the president of the Grayson-Jockey Club Research Foundation, an institution involved in funding equine research.

== Life and career ==
Bowen was born on December 23, 1942. He grew up in Fort Lauderdale, Florida, where he was influenced by a father who liked horses. He rode ponies as a boy and became a fan of thoroughbred racing from watching races on television. In 1960 he attended the University of Florida to study journalism then in 1963 transferred to the University of Kentucky, a move that allowed him to also write for the Lexington-based The Blood-Horse magazine.

In 1968 he accepted a job in Canada as editor of The Canadian Horse. In 1970 he returned to work for The Blood-Horse as its managing editor, remaining with magazine for another twenty-three years and rising to be its editor-in-chief.

Bowen was the author of eighteen books, including the two-volume set, Legacies of the Turf. He penned the story of Man o' War, the first book in the Thoroughbred Legends series published by Eclipse Press. For the series, he also authored the books on War Admiral, Nashua, and Bold Ruler. Bowen's most recent book was Matriarchs, Volume 2: More Great Mares of Modern Times , released in October 2008.

Bowen was the recipient of a number of industry awards including the 1972 Eclipse Award for Outstanding Magazine Writing.

Bowen died in Versailles, Kentucky, on January 20, 2025, at the age of 82.

== Bibliography ==
- From Foal to Champion (1991)
- Jockey Club's Illustrated History of Thoroughbred Racing in America (1994)
- Matriarchs: Great Mares of the 20th Century (1999)
- Dynasties: Great Thoroughbred Stallions (foreword by William S. Farish) (2000)
- At the Wire: Horse Racing's Greatest Moments (2001)
- Legacies of the Turf (2003)
- Belmont Park: A Century of Champions (original paintings by Richard Stone Reeves) (2005)
- Masters of the Turf (2007)
