= Counterpoint (horse) =

American-bred Thoroughbred racehorse

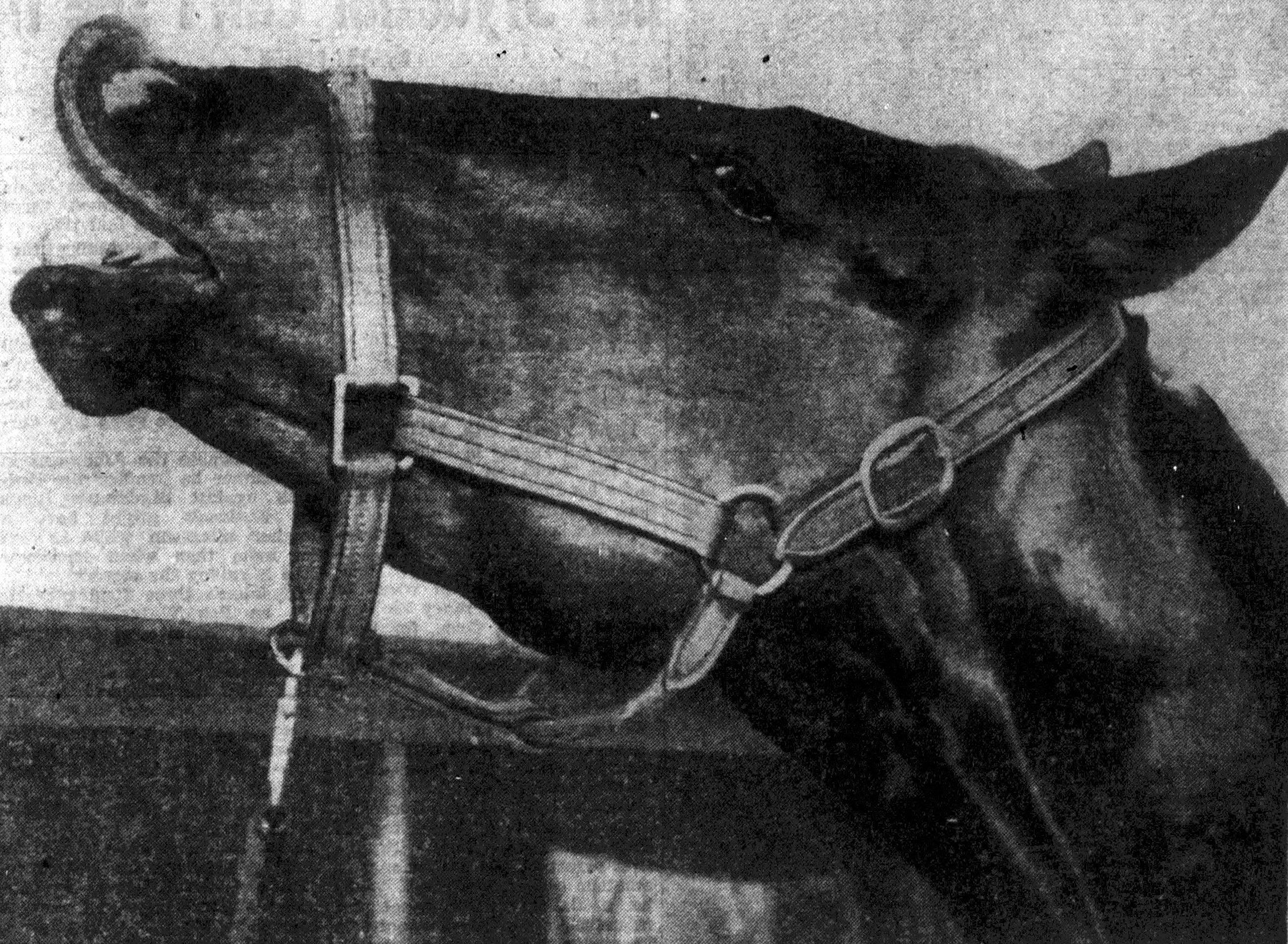
- Counterpoint, circa 1951
- Sire: Count Fleet
- Grandsire: Reigh Count
- Dam: Jabot
- Damsire: Sickle
- Sex: Stallion
- Foaled: 1948
- Country: United States
- Colour: Chestnut
- Breeder: Cornelius Vanderbilt Whitney
- Owner: Cornelius Vanderbilt Whitney
- Trainer: Sylvester Veitch
- Record: 21: 10-3-1
- Earnings: $284,575

Major wins
- Peter Pan Handicap (1951); Lawrence Realization Stakes (1951); Jockey Club Gold Cup (1951); Empire City Handicap (1951); Empire City Gold Cup (1951); San Fernando Stakes (1952); Whitney Handicap (1952) U.S. Triple Crown wins: Belmont Stakes (1951)

Awards
- U.S. Champion 3-Yr-Old Colt (1951); United States Horse of the Year (1951)
- Last updated on December 24, 2006

Counterpoint (1948–1969) was an American ChampionThoroughbred racehorse. He was sired by 1943 U.S. Triple Crown champion Count Fleet and out of the racemare Jabot, a multiple stakes winner and Santa Anita Parktrack record setter against 13 of the premier stake racers in the United States.

== Racing career ==
As a yearling he injured an ankle bone severely enough that his racing future was put in doubt. However, he healed to where he could be trained and at age two he started in two races but showed little, most likely hampered by the effects of injury and a late start in developing his strength.

=== 1951: three-year-old season ===
In his three-year-old campaign in 1951, Counterpoint was entered in the Blue Grass Stakes, an important test race for Kentucky Derby hopefuls. That year, the race was contested in two divisions because of the number of entrants. Counterpoint finished fourth in the second division of the Blue Grass but was moved up to third place after the winner, Sonic, was disqualified. His handlers then put him in the Kentucky Derby, where Counterpoint made a move at the three quarters pole but tired badly and finished eleventh to Count Turf, another son of Count Fleet.

Despite his poor showing in the Kentucky Derby, Counterpoint competed in the 1951 Preakness Stakes. Dismissed by bettors, he went off as a longshot at 25:1. He finished second, seven lengths behind Brookmeade Stable's winning colt Bold in the second-fastest time in Preakness history.

Counterpoint was entered in the June 16 Peter Pan Handicap at Belmont Park, which he won in track-record time. One week later, he ran in the 1½-mile Belmont Stakes, the longest of the Triple Crown races. In the Belmont, Counterpoint won by four lengths over George Widener Jr.'s U.S. Two-Year-Old Champion, Battlefield. For regular jockey Dave Gorman, it was his first and only classic race win, and for owner Cornelius Vanderbilt Whitney and trainer Sylvester Veitch, it was their second Belmont Stakes win together after capturing the 1947 edition with Phalanx.

Counterpoint bruised a foot and was out of racing for two months, but in early fall he returned to the track with a win in the important Lawrence Realization Stakes. He was then entered in the Jockey Club Gold Cup, where he competed against older horses, notably Christopher Chenery's heavily favored Hill Prince, the previous year's winner and 1950 Horse of the Year. Counterpoint won the two-mile race, beating Hill Prince by a neck, then won the Empire City Gold Cup while equaling the track record and assuring himself the 1951 Horse of the Year title. He received 28 of the 31 votes for the Daily Racing Form award in November and also topped the Turf and Sport Digest poll a month later.

=== 1952: four-year-old season ===
Raced at age four, Counterpoint won the inaugural San Fernando Stakes and the Whitney Stakes before being retired to stud duty at owner C.V. Whitney's breeding farm in Lexington, Kentucky.

== Retirement ==
Although Counterpoint sired a number of graded stakes race winners including Hollywood Gold Cup winner Dotted Swiss, none achieved the level of racing success he had. Counterpoint died in 1969 at the Whitney farm (today part of Gainesway Farm) and was buried in its equine cemetery next to a number of other prominent horses owned by both Cornelius Vanderbilt Whitney and his father, Harry Payne Whitney.
