= Dotted Swiss =

American-bred Thoroughbred racehorse

- Sire: Counterpoint
- Grandsire: Count Fleet
- Dam: Swistar
- Damsire: Pavot
- Sex: Stallion
- Foaled: 1956
- Country: United States
- Colour: Dark Bay/Brown
- Breeder: C. V. Whitney
- Owner: C. V. Whitney
- Trainer: Robert L. Wheeler
- Record: 25: 5-9-3
- Earnings: US$300,550

Major wins
- Hollywood Gold Cup (1960); Laurance Armour Memorial Handicap (1960); Sunset Handicap (1960); Cortez Handicap (1960)

Dotted Swiss (foaled 1956 in Kentucky) was an American Thoroughbred racehorse best known for winning the Hollywood Gold Cup in 1960. He was bred and raced by C. V. Whitney, a member of New York City's prominent Vanderbilt family. His dam was Swistar, a daughter of the 1944 American Champion Two-Year-Old Colt and 1945 Belmont Stakes winner, Pavot. Dotted Swiss was sired by Counterpoint, the 1951 American Horse of the Year and American Champion Three-Year-Old Male Horse. Counterpoint was a son of 1943 U.S. Triple Crown champion Count Fleet.
