= Jamestown (horse) =

American-bred Thoroughbred racehorse

- Sire: St. James
- Grandsire: Ambassador
- Dam: Mlle. Dazie
- Damsire: Fair Play
- Sex: Stallion
- Foaled: 1928
- Country: United States
- Colour: Bay
- Owner: George D. Widener Jr.
- Trainer: 1) A. Jack Joyner; 2) Bert Mulholland (1933)
- Record: 19: 12 ?-?
- Earnings: US$189,685

Major wins
- Flash Stakes (1930); United States Hotel Stakes (1930); Saratoga Special Stakes (1930); Grand Union Hotel Stakes (1930); Tournament Handicap (1931); Withers Stakes (1931); Colin Purse (1931); Capitol Handicap (1933)

Awards
- American Co-Champion Two-Year-Old Colt (1930)
- Last updated on January 20, 2010

Jamestown (1928–1953) was an American champion Thoroughbred racehorse. He was bred and raced by George D. Widener Jr., an Exemplar of Racing described by the Sarasota Herald-Tribune newspaper as "one of thoroughbred racing's most respected horsemen."

== Background ==
The Kentucky-bred Jamestown's name and image were used to promote Park & Tilford whiskey, which used the slogan: Proof of Kentucky bred quality! His sire was St. James, the 1923 retrospective American Co-Champion Two-Year-Old Colt. Jamestown was out of the mare Mlle. Dazie. His damsire was U. S. Racing Hall of Fame inductee Fair Play, who also sired Man o' War.

Conditioned for racing by future U. S. Racing Hall of Fame trainer Jack Joyner, Jamestown raced against very strong opponents in 1930 and 1931 when he was part of what the Chicago Tribune newspaper called the "big four" in racing, which included Twenty Grand, Mate, and Equipoise.

== Racing career ==
As a two-year-old, Jamestown won five important races, capping off 1930 with a win in the most prestigious race in the United States for two-year-olds, the Belmont Futurity Stakes. At a time when there was no official voting for annual racing Champions, Jamestown was recognized in the industry as the American Champion Two-Year-Old Colt. Although Jamestown twice defeated Equipoise, he shared the 1930 retrospective honors as listed by The Blood-Horse magazine and Thoroughbred Heritage.

Injured, Jamestown did not start again until May 27 of 1931, when the then three-year-old won the Tournament Handicap at Belmont Park. Three days later, the colt won the Withers Stakes at Belmont Park, and on June 9 at the same track won the Colin Purse. Four days after that, Jamestown raced again, finishing third to winner Twenty Grand in the Belmont Stakes. After running third in the June 25th Shelvin Stakes against inferior competition, Jamestown was rested and did not race again in 1931.

Racing as a four-year-old in 1932, on July 1 Jamestown ran second to Equipoise in world record time in the Delavan Handicap at Chicago's Arlington Park. Jack Joyner retired at the end of 1932, and assistant trainer Bert Mulholland took over as head trainer of the Widener stable. For Mulholland, the five-year-old Jamestown won the Capitol Handicap at Laurel Park Racecourse in Maryland.

== Stud record ==
Jamestown was retired to stud duty for the 1934 season at his owner's Erdenheim Farm in Montgomery County, Pennsylvania, but the following year Widener relocated him to his Old Kenney Farm in Lexington, Kentucky.

Overall, Jamestown met with reasonable success as a stallion, siring eighteen stakes race winners. Among his progeny were:

Foaled	Name	Sex	Major Wins/Achievements
1934	Smart Sheila	Mare	Fair Grounds Dinner Stakes
1936	Johnstown	Stallion	Kentucky Derby (1939), Belmont Stakes (1939)
1937	Rosetown	Mare	
1943	Natchez	Stallion	Travers Stakes

Through his daughter, Smart Sheila, Jamestown was also the damsire of Sheilas Reward, back-to-back winner of American Champion Sprint Horse honors in 1950 and 1951.

Jamestown died at age twenty-five in 1953 and is buried in the Old Kenney Farm's equine cemetery.

== Sire line tree ==
- Jamestown
  - Johnstown
  - Natchez
    - Bobby Brocato
