= Marshua Stakes top three finishers =

Listing of top three finishers in the Marshua Stakes horse race

This is a listing of the horses that finished in either first, second, or third place and the number of starters in the Marshua Stakes (1987–present), an American Thoroughbred Stakes race for fillies age three years-old at six furlongs run on dirt at Laurel Park Racecourse in Laurel, Maryland.

Year	Winner	Second	Third	Starters
2018	Limited View	Last True Love	Enchanted Ghost	6
2017	Star Super	Lucky in Malibu	Squan’s Kingdom	9
2016	Karen's Silk	Aye a Song	Lost Raven	8
2015	Lindisfarne	Lake Sebago	Comforter	9
2014	Gracer	Jump Two	Jonesin for Jerry	7
2013	No Race	No Race	No Race	0
2012	Dance to Bristol	Terralba	Defy Gravity	7
2011	Red's Round Table	Heather	Sweet Susan	7
2010	Gator Prowl	Jim's Prospect	Bellflower	8
2009	Strut the Canary	Huge	Apsenglow	7
2008	Throbbin' Heart	Kosmo's Buddy	Hartigan	n/a
2007	Laila's Punch	Luxury Class	Deep Dish Wildcat	n/a
2006	Celestial Legend	Flirt for Fame	Ten Halos	n/a
2005	Rush to Glory	Maysville	Promenade Girl	n/a
2004	Among My Souvenirs	Forestier	Ask Queenie	n/a
2003	Ladyecho	Powers Prospect	Love You Madly	n/a
2002	Two Times a Lady	Phyxius	Note Taker	n/a
2001	No Race	No Race	No Race	0
2000	Mary's Silver Pen	Something Young	Short Engagement	n/a
1999	Potomac Blend	Mysterious Jak	Silent Valay	n/a
1998	Chasseresse	Cosmo Topper	Graycious Dancer	n/a
1997	Meteor Cap	Prospectlea	Don't Fear the Heat	n/a
1996	Secret Prospect	Colonial Review	Say Strike	n/a
1995	White Cliffs	Perfect Swap	Crescent Park	n/a
1994	Pleasant Dilemma	Lady Beaumont	Baby Zip	n/a
1993	Carnirainbow	Sentimentaldiamond	Dasharoo	n/a
1992	Luramore	Gala Prospector	Anacreontic	n/a
1991	Picnic Island	Give Her a Hand	Red Tape	n/a
1990	Leery Baba	Knot in My Pocket	Brilliant Brass	n/a
1989	All About Style	Soho Sunday	Fit and Ready	n/a
1988	Willa On the Move	Fat and Foxy	Digglyliggylo	n/a
1987	Cagey Exuberance	Safe At the Plate	Kerygma	n/a
