= Kiss Me Kate (horse) =

American-bred Thoroughbred racehorse

- Sire: Count Fleet
- Grandsire: Reigh Count
- Dam: Irish Nora
- Damsire: Pharamond II
- Sex: Stallion
- Foaled: 1948
- Country: United States
- Color: Bay
- Breeder: Walter M. Jeffords Sr.
- Owner: Walter M. Jeffords Sr.
- Trainer: Oscar White
- Record: 29: 7-4-7
- Earnings: US$196,505

Major wins
- Acorn Stakes (1951); Delaware Oaks (1951); Gazelle Stakes (1951); Alabama Stakes (1952); New Castle Handicap (1952); Firenze Handicap (1953)

Awards
- American Champion Three-Year-Old Filly (1951)

Kiss Me Kate (foaled in 1948 in Kentucky) was an American Champion Thoroughbred racehorse. She was bred and raced by Walter M. Jeffords Sr., owner of Faraway Farm in Lexington Kentucky whose wife Sarah was the niece of Faraway Farms previous owner, Sam Riddle. Kiss Me Kate's sire was the 1943 U.S. Triple Crown Champion, Count Fleet. Her dam was Irish Nora, a daughter of the very good English-born sire, Pharamond II.

In a year in which the three-year-old filly won the Acorn Stakes, Delaware Oaks and Gazelle Stakes, was second or third in three other major races for fillies. She also ran against older males in the Jockey Club Gold Cup, finishing third to Counterpoint, the 1951 American Horse of the Year, and Hill Prince, the 1950 American Horse of the Year. Kiss Me Kate was voted the 1951 American Champion Three-Year-Old Filly.

Kiss Me Kate continued to race and win at ages four and five after which she was retired to broodmare duty. Her issue did not meet with any success in racing.
