= Count Fleet =

American-bred Thoroughbred racehorse

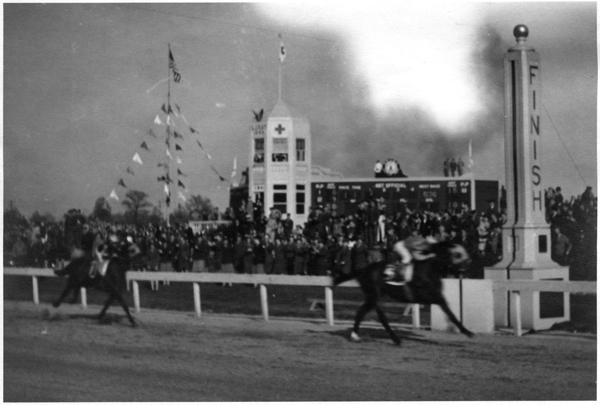
- Kentucky Derby win, May 1, 1943
- Sire: Reigh Count
- Grandsire: Sunreigh
- Dam: Quickly
- Damsire: Haste
- Sex: Stallion
- Foaled: March 24, 1940; Lexington, Kentucky, U.S.
- Died: December 3, 1973 (aged 33)
- Country: United States
- Color: Bay
- Breeder: Fannie Hertz
- Owner: Fannie Hertz. Colors: Yellow, black circle on sleeves, yellow cap
- Trainer: Don Cameron
- Record: 21: 16-4-1
- Earnings: $250,300

Major wins
- Wakefield Stakes (1942); Walden Stakes (1942); Champagne Stakes (1942); Pimlico Futurity (1942); Wood Memorial (1943); Withers Stakes (1943); Triple Crown race wins: Kentucky Derby (1943); Preakness Stakes (1943); Belmont Stakes (1943)

Awards
- 6th U.S. Triple Crown Champion (1943); U.S. Champion 2-Yr-Old Colt; U.S. Champion 3-Yr-Old Colt (1943); United States Horse of the Year (1943); Leading sire in North America (1951); Leading broodmare sire in North America (1963)

Honours
- U.S. Racing Hall of Fame (1961) #5 - Top 100 U.S. Racehorses of the 20th Century; Count Fleet Stakes at Aqueduct Racetrack; Count Fleet Sprint Handicap at Oaklawn Park
- Last updated on September 27, 2006

Count Fleet (March 24, 1940 – December 3, 1973) was a champion American Thoroughbred racehorse who is the sixth winner of the American Triple Crown. He won the Belmont Stakes by a then record margin of twenty-five lengths. After an undefeated season, he was named the 1943 Horse of the Year and champion three-year-old. Also a champion at age two, he is ranked as one of the greatest American racehorses of the twentieth century, ranking fifth on the Bloodhorse magazine's listing. He was inducted into the National Museum of Racing and Hall of Fame in 1961.

Count Fleet started his two-year-old campaign with two losses and was originally known more for his erratic behavior than his looks or racing ability. But the colt gradually improved, eventually winning 10 of 15 starts at age two, four of them in stakes company. At distances of a mile and up, he was undefeated. In the Champagne Stakes, he set a world record for a two-year-old at a mile. He was named champion two-year-old and became the early favorite to win the Kentucky Derby.

As a three-year-old, Count Fleet dominated North American racing, never losing a race. Leading up to the Kentucky Derby, he won the important Wood Memorial but injured himself in the process. He recovered to take the Derby, the United States' most prestigious race, by three lengths, then went on to Baltimore, Maryland, where he dominated the Preakness Stakes, taking that one by eight lengths. He won the Withers Stakes before heading to Elmont, New York for the Belmont Stakes where he captured the Triple Crown by scoring a 25-length victory, a margin that stood as the record until surpassed by Secretariat in 1973. When the season ended, Count Fleet was voted Champion Three Year Old and named American Horse of the Year.

Count Fleet was also a great success as a sire and broodmare sire, leading the North American lists in 1951 and 1963 respectively. He sired Kentucky Derby winner Count Turf and Belmont Stakes winners Counterpoint and One Count. He was the broodmare sire of five-time Horse of the Year Kelso, and sired the second dam of the influential sire Mr. Prospector. He died of natural causes in 1973 at the advanced age of 33 years as the longest lived Kentucky Derby winner ever.

== Background ==
Count Fleet was foaled at Stoner Creek Stud farm in Paris, Kentucky in 1940. He was bred and owned by Fannie Hertz, the wife of John D. Hertz of rental car company fame. Hertz became involved in horse racing in the 1920s and purchased eventual Kentucky Derby winner Reigh Count as a two-year-old in 1927. Reigh Count became a moderately successful sire, but his offspring were known more for stamina than speed and tended to develop late. Rather than pension the now unpopular stallion, Hertz decided to breed Reigh Count to only four mares a year, focusing on speed-oriented mares to balance the stamina influence of Reigh Count. One of these mares was the aptly named Quickly (by Haste), who had won 32 races from 85 starts, all of them at distances of six furlongs or less. Quickly's first foal with Reigh Count, a filly named Reigh Fleet, was unplaced in seven starts. Quickly was barren the next year, then produced Count Fleet in 1940.

Count Fleet was not a particularly attractive horse, called "narrow, light-waisted, and flat-muscled" by one expert and too leggy and light boned by others. He also had an unruly temperament. John Hertz initially did not think much of Count Fleet and contemplated selling him until jockey Johnny Longden convinced him to keep the colt. Count Fleet was trained by Don Cameron and ridden by future Hall of Fame inductee Longden.

== Racing record ==
=== 1942: two-year-old season ===
As a two-year-old Count Fleet started off slowly, finishing second in his first two starts while racing erratically. On June 19, 1942, though, he gained attention when he won a maiden race at Aqueduct Park by four lengths, despite having run out around the turn and losing many lengths to the field. On July 4, he entered the Army and Navy purse at Empire City Race Track, part of a special program of racing to benefit the war effort, and won by six lengths. He then finished second in the East View Stakes to Gold Shower, before rebounding to win the Wakefield Stakes by four lengths with Gold Shower in third.

He then traveled to Chicago where he won an allowance race on August 11 at Washington Park. On August 15, he finished second by a neck to the regarded Occupation in the rich Washington Park Futurity.

Although Occupation was now considered the front-runner for the two-year-old championship, Count Fleet kept his name in consideration with a win in the Mars Purse at Aqueduct on September 15. Going off at odds of 7:10, Count Fleet was pinched at the start, was then bumped by another horse and ran into traffic problems in the turn, but finally got free and closed strongly to win by a head. He and Occupation were next scheduled to meet in the Cowdin Stakes on September 19 but Count Fleet was scratched, presumably due to a sloppy track. Instead, he made his next start on September 24 in The Morello at Belmont Park, where he "conveyed the impression that he was out for a breeze, and merely beating the others as an incidental manner." He finally met up with Occupation again in the Belmont Futurity on October 3 in what was then the world's richest race for two-year-olds. Occupation won by five lengths with Count Fleet finishing third after grabbing his quarter (a situation where one of the hind legs cuts into the hoof of one of the front legs). Count Fleet could not be pulled up after the race and eventually circled the mile-and-a-half track.

On October 10, Count Fleet was entered in the Champagne Stakes, racing for the first time at a distance of a mile. In Occupation's absence, Count Fleet was made the even money favorite. He broke well and, in a change from his normal tactics, went to the early lead. Establishing a two-length lead down the backstretch, he rebuffed a challenge by Slide Rule around the turn and then continued to draw away down the stretch. His final winning margin was six lengths over Blue Swords with Attendant eight more lengths back in third. Count Fleet's time of 1:34 4/5 was not only a new track record, it was also a world record for the fastest mile ever run by a two-year-old.

Count Fleet followed this up with a six-length win in the Thunderclap Purse on October 20 at odds of 1:4. On October 31, he again faced off with Occupation in the Pimlico Futurity in what essentially became a match race. Occupation took the early lead but Count Fleet moved up on the outside and the two matched strides down the backstretch and into the final turn. Rounding into the stretch, Count Fleet started to draw away and eventually won by six lengths. His time of 1:43 3/5 for 1 1/16 miles equaled the track record and broke the existing stakes record by over a second.

Count Fleet finished his two-year-old campaign on November 10 in the Walden Stakes at Pimlico. Going off as the 1-10 favorite, he ran away from the field and won by twenty lengths (other sources have the margin of victory as 30 lengths.) At season's end, he had won 10 of his 15 races while never being out of the money, a performance that earned him the two-year-old championship honors. He was assigned 132 pounds (60 kg) on the 1942 Experimental Free Handicap, the highest impost ever.

=== 1943: three-year-old season ===
Because of the intensifying war effort, horse racing suffered many cutbacks starting in January 1943, including transportation restrictions and a shutdown of the Florida racing circuit. As a result, Count Fleet spent the winter at Oaklawn Park in Arkansas, then was shipped to Belmont Park, arriving on March 19. In early April, he kicked himself in a morning workout but shrugged off the injury with a strong workout on the following day, completing 1 1/8 miles in 1:55 despite being eased in the final eighth of a mile.

Count Fleet made his first start of the year on April 13 in the St James Purse over a sloppy track at Aqueduct. Going off at odds of 3:20, Count Fleet rated behind the early pace set by Bossuet, then started his move on the final turn to win by four lengths. Count Fleet was injured in the left foreleg during the race, but although the skin was broken he recovered quickly.

On April 17, Count Fleet returned in the Wood Memorial Stakes, going off as the 1-4 favorite. He was again injured, this time suffering a three-inch slice along the coronet band of a hoof, possibly caused when he was bumped at the start but more likely by a strike from one of his other legs as he started to accelerate. Count Fleet quickly entered into a duel with Blue Swords for the early lead, then was sent to the front on the first turn. He opened up a four length lead down the backstretch, then continued "serenely on his way" to victory.

After the race, the torn portion and part of the left hind hoof were removed, then the wound was packed with sulfa drugs. Fortunately, the wound did not become infected so Count Fleet was shipped on April 19 to Churchill Downs, which had to be done so soon after the Wood Memorial due to extensive travel restrictions.

==== Triple Crown ====
The 1943 Kentucky Derby was almost not run because of wartime restrictions, but Colonel Matt Winn organized it as a "street-car Derby" – restricting travel for out-of-state residents and not allowing cars be driven to the event. Despite this, some 60,000 people attended the race and made Count Fleet the 2-5 favorite – the shortest starting price in Derby history. Ocean Wave, who would have been the second betting choice after winning the Blue Grass Stakes and Derby Trial, was scratched hours before the race. Count Fleet broke well and challenged Gold Shower, Burnt Shower and Blue Swords for the early lead. After a quarter mile, Count Fleet found himself boxed by the other horses but broke free moving into the first turn. He then moved up to challenge Gold Shower for the lead on the first turn and opened up a two-length lead down the backstretch. On the far turn, Blue Swords mounted a challenge and closed to within a length. Longden then clucked to Count Fleet, who quickly opened a three-length advantage and won handily.

"I never was afraid of Ocean Wave or any of the others in that field", said Longden. "I don't know the great horses like Man o' War because I wasn't around then. But the Count is the greatest I've ever ridden. Got everything, speed, heart – just everything."

Count Fleet again injured himself, this time in the left fore, but the injury was not serious. He shipped to Baltimore for the Preakness Stakes on May 8, going off as the 3-20 favorite in a four horse field. New Moon broke fastest but Count Fleet quickly took the lead and coasted to an eight length victory. His time was 1:57 3/5 for the distance of 1 3/16 miles over a track labeled as good, with the horses racing in the center of the track well away from the rail.

Count Fleet next entered the Withers Stakes at Belmont Park on May 22, cutting back in distance to a mile. Against only two rivals, he was made the 1-20 favorite. He seized the early lead and was never challenged while winning by eight lengths. His time of 1:36 over a slow track was the fastest mile of the meeting, despite the fact that Count Fleet raced more than 40 feet off the rail around the turn.

"Count Fleet’s sophomore year was like a skyrocket flaring across the sky to reach its climax of blinding white, then suddenly blacking out. Man o’ War and, in later years, Citation had somewhat the same effect on the sport. But the shortness of this one, with complete dominance over racers of all ages and sex, is almost without parallel in the Thoroughbred annals."

— Sportswriter Robert Kelly

On June 5, Count Fleet completed the Triple Crown by winning the Belmont Stakes by 25 lengths (listed by The New York Times as 30 lengths). Going off at odds of 1:20 (the legal minimum) in a three-horse field, he led from start to finish. Despite the lack of competition, his time of 2:28 1/5 broke War Admiral's stakes record by two-fifths of a second. This time stood as the stakes record (though tied by Citation in 1948) until broken by Gallant Man in 1957. His margin of victory was also a record until broken by Secretariat in 1973, who won by 31 lengths.

After the race, his silks were auctioned for $50,000 in war bonds.

At the time, his sweep of the Triple Crown was considered "commonplace" as it had been done six times since Sir Barton in 1919. However, the victory earned Count Fleet favorable comparisons with Man o' War.

Once again, Count Fleet injured himself, this time by striking his left fore ankle early in the race. The ankle was X-rayed, indicating a slight wrench. Although it was believed that Count Fleet would soon return to racing, John Hertz released a statement in August that Count Fleet had subsequently developed a splint in his right foreleg that laid him up for two months. This effectively ended his three-year-old campaign, since it would take a further two months to get him back into racing shape. "We like him too well," said Hertz, "and we like racing and breeding too well, to attempt to force the training of this kind of horse and possibly start him in anything but his top condition."

With a record of six wins from six starts, Count Fleet was named the American Horse of the Year and champion three-year-old of 1943.

== Racing statistics ==
Date	Age	Distance	Race	Track	Odds	Field	Finish	Margin	Time	Condition
Jun 1, 1942	2	5 furlongs	Maiden Special Weight	Belmont Park	4.10	16	2	(1 1/2 lengths)	0:57 2/5	fast
Jun 15, 1942	2	5 1/2 furlongs	Maiden Special Weight	Aqueduct	*1.35	14	2	(1 1/2 lengths)	1:06 1/5	fast
Jun 19, 1942	2	5 1/2 furlongs	Maiden Special Weight	Aqueduct	*0.75	10	1	4 lengths	1:06	fast
Jul 4, 1942	2	5 1/2 furlongs	Allowance (Army & Navy)	Empire City	*1.15	6	1	5 lengths	1:05 4/5	fast
Jul 15, 1942	2	5 3/4 furlongs	East View Stakes	Empire City	*0.50	6	2	(1 lengths)	1:08	fast
Jul 22, 1942	2	5 3/4 furlongs	Wakefield Stakes	Empire City	*0.65	4	1	4 lengths	1:07 4/5	fast
Aug 11, 1942	2	6 furlongs	Allowance	Washington Park	*0.50	9	1	Neck	1:13	good
Aug 15, 1942	2	6 furlongs	Washington Park Futurity	Washington Park	4.80	11	2	(Neck)	1:12	fast
Sep 15, 1942	2	6 furlongs	Allowance (Mars Purse)	Aqueduct	*0.70	10	1	Neck	1:12	fast
Sep 24, 1942	2	6 furlongs	Allowance	Belmont Park	*1.40	13	1	2 1/2 lengths	1:10 3/5	fast
Oct 3, 1942	2	6 1/2 furlongs	Futurity Stakes	Belmont Park	*1.55	10	3	(5 lengths)	1:15 1/5	fast
Oct 10, 1942	2	1 mile	Champagne Stakes	Belmont Park	*1.05	8	1	6 lengths	1:34 4/5	fast
Oct 20, 1942	2	1 mile, 70 yards	Allowance (Thunderclap purse)	Jamaica	*0.25	8	1	6 lengths	1:44	fast
Oct 31, 1942	2	1 1/16 miles	Pimlico Futurity	Pimlico	1.25	3	1	5 lengths	1:43 3/5	fast
Nov 10, 1942	2	1 1/16 miles	Walden Stakes	Pimlico	*0.10	4	1	30 lengths	1:44 4/5	good
Apr 13, 1943	3	1 mile, 70 yards	Allowance	Jamaica	*0.15	8	1	3 1/2 lengths	1:42 4/5	sloppy
Apr 17, 1943	3	1 1/16 miles	Wood Memorial	Jamaica	*0.25	8	1	3 1/2 lengths	1:43	fast
May 1, 1943	3	1 1/4 miles	Kentucky Derby	Churchill Downs	*0.40	10	1	3 lengths	2:04	fast
May 8, 1943	3	1 3/16 miles	Preakness Stakes	Pimlico	*0.15	4	1	8 lengths	1:57 2/5	good
May 22, 1943	3	1 mile	Withers Stakes	Belmont Park	*0.05	3	1	5 lengths	1:36	muddy
Jun 5, 1943	3	1 1/2 miles	Belmont Stakes	Belmont	*0.05	3	1	25 lengths	2:28 1/5	fast

An asterisk before the odds means Count Fleet was the post time favorite

Source: Daily Racing Form Past Performances

== Stud record ==
Count Fleet was originally expected to race at age four but kept re-injuring himself before he was able to do so. He was officially retired to stud in July 1944 having won 16 of 21 races and went on to enjoy great success as a sire. From 434 named foals, he sired 267 winners and 39 stakes winners. Himself the son of Derby winner Reigh Count, he went on to sire another Derby winner, Count Turf. Only one other such three-generation sequence of Derby winners exists: Pensive, Ponder and Needles. Other major winners by Count Fleet include Belmont Stakes champions Counterpoint and One Count, and champion filly Kiss Me Kate. He was the leading sire in North America of 1951.

Count Fleet was an outstanding broodmare sire, leading the broodmare sire list in 1963 and runner-up in 1960 and 1961. His daughters produced Kelso, 1965 Kentucky Derby winner Lucky Debonair, the Canadian star filly Ice Water, and multiple stakes winners Tompion, Lamb Chop and Quill. Another daughter, Sequence, mated with 1955 Preakness and Belmont winner Nashua to produce Gold Digger, dam of the highly influential sire Mr. Prospector. His daughter Virginia Water was mated with Princequillo to produce Milan Mill, the dam of Mill Reef. Although Count Fleet's sire line is now extinct, he is still an important influence in modern pedigrees through his daughters. For example, he appears twice in the pedigree of 2015 Triple Crown winner American Pharoah.

== Death and longevity ==
After failing to stand for two days due to old age infirmities and lameness, Count Fleet died on December 3, 1973, of an apparent blood clot and was buried at Stoner Creek farm in Paris, Kentucky. At the time of his death, he had become the longest-lived winner of all three triple crown races according to the foaling and death records that are available. Additionally, he had outlived many of his own offspring. More than forty years later, he remains the longest-lived Kentucky Derby winner ever, as well as the longest-lived Preakness Stakes winner ever. Four days short of fourteen years after the day of his death, Gallant Man surpassed him as the longest-lived Belmont Stakes winner and the longest-lived winner of any Triple Crown race.

== Honors ==
In 1961, Count Fleet was inducted in the National Museum of Racing and Hall of Fame.

In the Blood-Horse magazine ranking of the top 100 U.S. thoroughbred champions of the 20th Century, Count Fleet was ranked #5. His performance in the Belmont Stakes was ranked #33 in Horse Racing's Top 100 Moments, a book published by The Blood-Horse in 2006 of racing in the 20th century.

Two races were named in his honor: the Count Fleet Stakes at Belmont and then Aqueduct (last run in 2012) and the Count Fleet Sprint Handicap at Oaklawn Park.

== Sire line tree ==
- Count Fleet
  - Count-A-Bit
  - Ennobled
  - Fleeting Star
  - Be Fleet
  - Beau Gar
    - Beau Purple
    - High Patches
  - County Delight
    - Caledon Beau
    - Lake Delaware
  - Auditing
    - Mr Right
  - Count Turf
    - Manassa Mauler
  - Counterpoint
    - Harmonizing
    - Dotted Swiss
    - Counterate
    - Munden Point
    - Fast Count
    - Over The Counter
  - Comte De Grasse
    - Fair Account
  - Count Flame
    - Roving Minstrel
  - One Count
    - Sharp Count
    - Water Prince
      - Duck Dance
    - Handsome Boy
      - Arbees Boy
    - Beau Marker
  - By Zeus
  - Straight Face
  - Portersville
  - Count Of Honor
  - General Arthur

== Pedigree ==
Pedigree of Count Fleet (USA), br. h. 1940
Sire Reigh Count Ch. 1925	Sunreigh; Ch. 1919	Sundridge	Amphion
Sire Reigh Count Ch. 1925	Sunreigh; Ch. 1919	Sundridge	Sierra
Sire Reigh Count Ch. 1925	Sunreigh; Ch. 1919	Sweet Briar	St Frusquin*
Sire Reigh Count Ch. 1925	Sunreigh; Ch. 1919	Sweet Briar	Presentation
Sire Reigh Count Ch. 1925	Contessina; B. 1909	Count Schomberg	Aughrim
Sire Reigh Count Ch. 1925	Contessina; B. 1909	Count Schomberg	Clonavarn
Sire Reigh Count Ch. 1925	Contessina; B. 1909	Pitti	St Frusquin*
Sire Reigh Count Ch. 1925	Contessina; B. 1909	Pitti	Florence
Dam Quickly 1930	Haste; B. 1923	Maintenant	Maintenon
Dam Quickly 1930	Haste; B. 1923	Maintenant	Martha Gorman
Dam Quickly 1930	Haste; B. 1923	Miss Malaprop	Meddler
Dam Quickly 1930	Haste; B. 1923	Miss Malaprop	Correction
Dam Quickly 1930	Stephanie; Gr. 1925	Stefan the Great	The Tetrarch
Dam Quickly 1930	Stephanie; Gr. 1925	Stefan the Great	Perfect Peach
Dam Quickly 1930	Stephanie; Gr. 1925	Malachite	Rock Sand
Dam Quickly 1930	Stephanie; Gr. 1925	Malachite	Miss Hanover (Family: 6-a)

* Count Fleet is inbred 4S x 4S to the stallion St Frusquin, meaning that he appears fourth generation twice on the sire side of his pedigree.
