= Aiken Thoroughbred Racing Hall of Fame and Museum =

Equestrian hall of fame in South Carolina, USA

- Home of Aiken's Racing Champions
- Established: 1977
- Location: Aiken, South Carolina
- Coordinates: 33.5479°N 81.7227°W
- Type: Hall of fame
- Website: ATRHoF

The Aiken Thoroughbred Racing Hall of Fame and Museum was established in 1977 as a tribute to the famous flat racing and steeplechase Thoroughbred horses that trained in Aiken, South Carolina.

The museum was a project of the local Jaycees, aided by Thoroughbred horse racing expert Whitney Tower, horse racing editor for Sports Illustrated and vice president of the National Racing Museum and chair of its Hall of Fame.

The museum is located on the grounds of Hopelands Gardens, the former home of Charles Oliver Iselin and Hope Goddard Iselin that is now owned by the City of Aiken. The museum occupies the Iselins' former carriage house and stables. The Hall of Fame commemorates 40 Eclipse Award-winning horses that trained in Aiken; the museum also includes a variety of other exhibits.

== Inductees ==
- Assagai
- Barnaby's Bluff
- Blue Peter
- Bowl Game
- Candy Éclair
- Capot
- Christmas Past
- Conniver
- Conquistador Cielo
- De La Rose
- Demonstrative
- Devil Diver
- Elkridge
- Forty Niner
- Gallorette
- Gamely
- Hawaii
- Heavenly Cause
- Kelso
- Lamb Chop
- Late Bloomer
- Midshipman
- Neji
- Oedipus
- Open Fire
- Pleasant Colony
- Pleasant Stage
- Pleasant Tap
- Politely
- Quick Pitch
- Relaxing
- Sensational
- Shuvee
- Smart Angle
- Snow Knight
- Stage Door Johnny
- Storm Song
- Swale
- Tea Maker
- Tom Fool

== See also ==
- U.S. Thoroughbred Racing Hall of Fame
