= Heavenly Cause =

American-bred Thoroughbred racehorse

- Sire: Grey Dawn
- Grandsire: Herbager
- Dam: Lady Dulcinea
- Damsire: Nantallah
- Sex: Filly
- Foaled: 1978
- Country: United States
- Colour: Gray
- Breeder: Adele W. Paxson
- Owner: Ryehill Farm
- Trainer: Woody Stephens
- Record: 21: 9-4-2
- Earnings: US$622,481

Major wins
- Selima Stakes (1980); Frizette Stakes (1980); Acorn Stakes (1981); Fantasy Stakes (1981); La Troienne Stakes (1981); Kentucky Oaks (1981)

Awards
- American Champion Two-Year-Old Filly (1980)

Honours
- Aiken Thoroughbred Racing Hall of Fame (1981); Heavenly Cause Stakes at Laurel Park

Heavenly Cause (foaled May 22, 1978 in Maryland) was an American Thoroughbred champion racehorse.

== Background ==
Bred by Adele W. Paxson, Heavenly Cause was sired by Grey Dawn, the 1964 French Champion Two-Year-Old Colt and 1990 Leading broodmare sire in North America. Her dam was Lady Dulcinea, a granddaughter of Nearco who has been described by Thoroughbred Heritage as "one of the greatest racehorses of the Twentieth Century" and "one of the most important sires of the century." She was purchased by Jim and Eleanor Ryan who raced her under the name of their Ryehill Farm.

Heavenly Cause was trained by U.S. Racing Hall of Fame inductee, Woody Stephens.

== Racing career ==
Heavenly Cause won four of nine starts at age two, including the Grades 1 Selima and Frizette Stakes and was voted the 1980 Eclipse Award for American Champion Two-Year-Old Filly.

As a three-year-old, Heavenly Cause had five wins in twelve starts. Racing at Florida's Gulfstream Park early in 1981, she finished second to Dame Mysterieuse in the Forward Gal Stakes and third to her in the Bonnie Miss Stakes. Heavenly Cause then went on to win the La Troienne and Fantasy Stakes before capturing the May 2, Kentucky Oaks at Churchill Downs in which she defeated a very strong field that included De La Rose, Wayward Lass, and the betting favorite, Truly Bound. Three weeks later she followed up with a win in the May 23 Acorn Stakes at Belmont Park. In late June Heavenly Cause ran second to in the Mother Goose Stakes to Wayward Lass who would dominate her age group for the remainder of the year and earn American Champion Three-Year-Old Filly honors.

== Broodmare ==
Retired to broodmare duty, Heavenly Cause stood in the United States until going to breeders in England in 1992. Between 1983 and 1997, she produced twelve foals from notable stallions including Danzig, Lyphard, Mr. Prospector, Seattle Slew, Secretariat, and Halo. Ten of her foals raced, and seven were minor winners.

== Honors ==
Heavenly Cause was elected to the Aiken Thoroughbred Racing Hall of Fame on March 15, 1981. In her honor, a seven furlong race for two-year-old fillies at Laurel Park Racecourse was named the Heavenly Cause Stakes.
