= Jabot (horse) =

American Thoroughbred racehorse

- Sire: Sickle
- Grandsire: Phalaris
- Dam: Frilette
- Damsire: Man o' War
- Sex: Mare
- Foaled: 1931
- Country: United States
- Colour: Chestnut
- Breeder: Cornelius Vanderbilt Whitney
- Owner: Cornelius Vanderbilt Whitney
- Trainer: T. J. & John Healey
- Record: 30: 12-2-4
- Earnings: US$42,760

Major wins
- Selima Stakes (1933); Rockingham Juvenile Handicap (1933); Kentucky Stakes (1933); Speed Handicap (1934); San Carlos Handicap (1935)

Jabot (foaled 1931 in Kentucky) was an American Thoroughbred racemare who won several stakes races and set a new Santa Anita Park track record in winning the San Carlos Handicap over 13 of the premier stake racers in the country. Her place in racing history was accentuated as the dam of the 1951 American Horse of the Year, Counterpoint.

Bred and raced by Cornelius Vanderbilt Whitney, Jabot was trained by the father and son team of Tom and John Healey.

== Breeding ==
Jabot was a full sister to Cravat, a record-setting colt who won on both dirt and turf racecourses. They were sired by Sickle, a British Champion Two-Year-Old Colt who would become a two-time leading sire in North America. Sickle was a son of the important sire Phalaris, a two-time leading sire in Great Britain and Ireland. Jabot and Cravat's dam was Frilette, a daughter of the legendary U.S. Racing Hall of Fame inductee Man o' War.

== Pedigree ==
Pedigree of Jabot, chestnut mare, 1931
Sire Sickle	Phalaris	Polymelus	Cyllene
Sire Sickle	Phalaris	Polymelus	Maid Marian
Sire Sickle	Phalaris	Bromus	Sainfoin
Sire Sickle	Phalaris	Bromus	Cheery
Sire Sickle	Selene	Chaucer	St. Simon
Sire Sickle	Selene	Chaucer	Canterbury Pilgrim
Sire Sickle	Selene	Serenissima	Minoru
Sire Sickle	Selene	Serenissima	Gondolette
Dam Frilette	Man o' War	Fair Play	Hastings
Dam Frilette	Man o' War	Fair Play	Fairy Gold
Dam Frilette	Man o' War	Mahubah	Rock Sand
Dam Frilette	Man o' War	Mahubah	Merry Token
Dam Frilette	Frillery	Broomstick	Ben Brush
Dam Frilette	Frillery	Broomstick	Elf
Dam Frilette	Frillery	Petticoat	Hamburg
Dam Frilette	Frillery	Petticoat	Elusive (family: A1)
