= Creole Maid =

American-bred Thoroughbred racehorse

- Sire: Pharamond
- Grandsire: Phalaris
- Dam: Baton Rouge
- Damsire: Man o' War
- Sex: Mare
- Foaled: 1935
- Country: United States
- Colour: Bay
- Breeder: Walter M. Jeffords, Sr.
- Owner: Sarah F. Jeffords
- Trainer: Preston M. Burch
- Record: 19: 4-4-1
- Earnings: US$20,950

Major wins
- Schuylerville Stakes (1937); Adirondack Handicap (1937); Coaching Club American Oaks (1938)

Creole Maid (foaled 1935 in Kentucky) was an American Thoroughbred racemare owned by Sarah F. Jeffords and trained by National Museum of Racing and Hall of Fame inductee, Preston Burch.

A granddaughter of Man o' War, Creole Maid won important races such as the 1937 Schuylerville Stakes, the 1937 Adirondack Handicap, and as a three-year-old in 1938, the very important Coaching Club American Oaks.

After retiring from racing, Creole Maid served as a broodmare for her owner and notably produced the fast colt, Natchez.

== Pedigree ==
Pedigree of Creole Maid, Bay mare (USA), 1935
Sire Pharamond (GB) (1925)	Phalaris (GB) (1913)	Polymelus (GB) (1902)	Cyllene (GB) (1895)
Sire Pharamond (GB) (1925)	Phalaris (GB) (1913)	Polymelus (GB) (1902)	Maid Marian (GB) (1886)
Sire Pharamond (GB) (1925)	Phalaris (GB) (1913)	Bromus (GB) (1905)	Sainfoin (GB) (1887)
Sire Pharamond (GB) (1925)	Phalaris (GB) (1913)	Bromus (GB) (1905)	Cheery (GB) (1892)
Sire Pharamond (GB) (1925)	Selene (GB) (1919)	Chaucer (GB) (1900)	St. Simon (GB) (1881)
Sire Pharamond (GB) (1925)	Selene (GB) (1919)	Chaucer (GB) (1900)	Canterbury Pilgrim (GB) (1893)
Sire Pharamond (GB) (1925)	Selene (GB) (1919)	Serenissima (GB) (1913)	Minoru (GB) (1906)
Sire Pharamond (GB) (1925)	Selene (GB) (1919)	Serenissima (GB) (1913)	Gondolette (GB) (1902)
Dam Baton Rouge (1927)	Man o' War (1917)	Fair Play (1905)	Hastings (1893)
Dam Baton Rouge (1927)	Man o' War (1917)	Fair Play (1905)	Fairy Gold (GB) (1896)
Dam Baton Rouge (1927)	Man o' War (1917)	Mahubah (1917)	Rock Sand (GB) (1900)
Dam Baton Rouge (1927)	Man o' War (1917)	Mahubah (1917)	Merry Token (GB) (1891)
Dam Baton Rouge (1927)	Baton (1921)	Hainault (GB) (1914)	Swynford (GB) (1907)
Dam Baton Rouge (1927)	Baton (1921)	Hainault (GB) (1914)	Bromus (GB) (1905)
Dam Baton Rouge (1927)	Baton (1921)	Batanoea (IRE) (1916)	Roi Herode (FR) (1904)
Dam Baton Rouge (1927)	Baton (1921)	Batanoea (IRE) (1916)	Pink Clover (GB) (1910)
