= Adele W. Paxson =

American socialite and horse breeder

Adele Paxson
- Born: 1913; Pennsylvania, United States
- Died: December 27, 2000 (aged 86–87); Doylestown, Pennsylvania, U.S.
- Occupations: Thoroughbred owner/breeder, Philanthropist
- Political party: Republican
- Spouse: Henry Douglas Paxson (1904-1975)
- Children: 1) Mary Helen; 2) Sally Paxson Davis (1940-2008)
- Honors: Eclipse Award for Outstanding Breeder (1980); V.E.R.A. Award (1993)

Adele Warden Paxson (1913 – December 27, 2000) was an American socialite, philanthropist, conservationist, and a champion breeder of thoroughbred racehorses.

Born Adele Corning Warden, she was the daughter of Helen Corning and her husband Clarence Warden. On January 3, 1936, she married attorney Henry Douglas Paxson, a partner in a Philadelphia law firm with Richardson Dilworth. The couple had two daughters, Mary Helen and Sally. Their firstborn, Mary Helen, died in an automobile accident in France. Sally went on to have two children, Doug and Caroline. Although Adele Paxson is frequently recorded as Mrs. Henry D. Paxson, her husband was known as Doug, short for his middle name.

With a lifelong passion for music, engendered by her mother, Adele Paxson was Chairperson of Philadelphia's Academy of Vocal Arts and with her husband established the Bucks County Opera. She also served as Chairperson of the Opera Company of Philadelphia. In 1993 she received the Voice Education Research Awareness Award (V.E.R.A.) from the Voice Foundation of Philadelphia.

== Philanthropy ==
Adele Paxson supported numerous cultural institutions in a variety of areas. In 1934, her mother, Helen Warden, founded the Academy of Vocal Arts in Philadelphia to support and train young opera singers in a 4-year program. Adele Paxson followed in her mother's footsteps, serving as the institution's Chairperson as did her own daughter, Sally Paxson Davis. In addition to her lifelong support, Adele Paxson bequeathed $7 million to the academy for endowment and renovations.

An advocate for the protection of farmlands from real estate developers, Adele Paxson made a donation to Heritage Conservancy (located in Doylestown, PA) of conservation easements totaling more than 300 acres (120 ha) from her Buckingham and Solebury farms valued at $10 million.

Paxson was a member of the Heritage Club of the Central Bucks Family YMCA through her support of the Endowment Fund and included the YMCA in her estate plans.

A founding supporter, Adele Paxson donated more than $1 million to help construct the Kimmel Center for the Performing Arts in Philadelphia.

== Thoroughbred horse racing ==
Adele Paxon's husband inherited Elm Grove Farm on Old York Road in Holicong, Bucks County, Pennsylvania. Near the community of Lahaska, Elm Grove is an original Colonial Province of Pennsylvania property, it was granted to Henry Paxson's family in 1680 by Governor William Penn.

An avid horsewoman, Adele Paxson began riding while still a young girl. As an adult, she rode frequently and was a competitor in the Devon Horse Show.

At Elm Grove Farm, the Paxsons bred field hunter horses as well as Thoroughbreds for flat racing. She and her husband served as Masters of Foxhounds at the Huntingdon Valley Hunt Club. While Adele Paxson owned many champion hunter horses, she gained national recognition with her flat-racing Thoroughbreds. In addition to the Elm Grove Farm breeding operation, Adele Paxson maintained a racing stable in Florida and a barn at the Aiken Training Track in Aiken, South Carolina. Of her numerous successful racehorses, the best known is the 1978 American Co-Champion Two-Year-Old Filly, Candy Éclair. Adele Paxson was the breeder of Heavenly Cause who was voted the 1980 American Champion Two-Year-Old Filly. That year she received the Thoroughbred racing industry's highest honor, the Eclipse Award for Outstanding Breeder.

In an interview following Adele Paxon's death, Rick Abbott, who managed her racing and breeding operation during the 1990s said of her: "the welfare of the horses always came first," and that "money was not a concern. Working with her was the most gratifying thing I have ever done."

In failing health, during the latter part of the 1990s Adele Paxson began selling off her racehorses and in early December 2000 Rick Abbott oversaw the sale of her remaining bloodstock at the Fasig-Tipton Midlantic mixed auction in Timonium, Maryland.

Confined to a nursing home for the better part of 2000, Adele Paxson died on December 27 at age eighty-seven from complications of pneumonia at a hospital in Doylestown, Pennsylvania, hospital.
