= Richard Stone Reeves =

American painter

Richard Stone Reeves (November 6, 1919 – October 7, 2005) was an American equine painter whom Blood-Horse magazine described as perhaps the greatest modern-day horse painter.

Born in New York City, Reeves grew up in Garden City on Long Island. His father's family included a painter and his mother's owned race horses. Those influences, plus living near Belmont Park, resulted in his love of horses and desire to paint them.

Reeves graduated with a Fine Arts degree from Syracuse University. He served with the United States Navy during World War II after which he embarked on a career as a painter of horses. His big break came when Life magazine featured his painting of 1947 Horse of the Year, Armed. That publicity led to his being hired to do private portraitures for many American and European horse owners. As well as portraits, Reeves did a number of action scenes from memorable races. More than a dozen of his works can be found in the National Museum of Racing and Hall of Fame in Saratoga Springs, New York.

When asked, Reeves said: "Buckpasser was the most perfectly proportioned Thoroughbred I have ever seen." Only two horses, Secretariat and Affirmed, have since been "in a class with Buckpasser".

Reeves died October 7, 2005, at Eastern Long Island Hospital in Greenport, N.Y.

== Books ==
- Horse named Kelso - Pat Johnson and Walter D. Osborne (1970) - Illustrated with Richard Stone Reeves' paintings.
- Thoroughbreds I Have Known (1973) - portraits by Richard Stone Reeves.
- Classic Lines : A Gallery of the Great Thoroughbreds (1975) - with Patrick Robinson.
- Decade of Champions : The Greatest Years in the History of Thoroughbred Racing, 1970-1980. (1981) - with Patrick Robinson.
- The Golden Post (September 15, 1985) - with Patrick Robinson. 2,000 copies, signed and numbered.
- Legends : The Art of Richard Stone Reeves (1989)
- Belmont Park: A Century of Champions. Edward L. Bowen. (2005) - Original paintings by Richard Stone Reeves.
