= Marshua =

American-bred Thoroughbred racehorse

- Sire: Nashua
- Dam: Emardee
- Damsire: Heliopolis
- Sex: Mare
- Foaled: 1962
- Country: United States
- Color: Brown
- Breeder: Helene D. Gilroy
- Owner: Helene D. Gilroy
- Trainer: Norman R. McLeod
- Record: 21: 9-6-4
- Earnings: $317,599

Major wins
- Selima Stakes (1964); Schuylerville Stakes (1964); Gardenia Stakes (1964); Marguerite Stakes (1964); Coaching Club American Oaks (1965)

Honors
- Marshua Stakes at Laurel Park Racecourse
- Last updated on August 11, 2021

Marshua (foaled March 19, 1962) was a multi Graded stakes winning American Thoroughbred racemare bred and raced by Helene D. Gilroy, a partner with her husband in the Missouri-based Interstate Gas Corporation.

== Background ==
Marshua was sired by Nashua out of Emardee, by Heliopolis. In 1964, she was ranked second in her class of two-year-olds. She made 16 starts that year and was in the money 15 times, or 94% of the time. The highlight of that season was her victory in the prestigious Selima Stakes at Laurel Park Racecorse in Maryland. Having led all the way around the 1-1/16 mile event, she battled Queen Empress through the stretch to win by a fading neck. Queen Empress was later named American Champion Two-Year-Old Filly. In addition to the Selima, Marshua won the Schuylerville Stakes and the Marguerite Stakes in her freshman year.

At age three, Marshua ran second in the Acorn Stakes and won the filly classic Coaching Club American Oaks. She retired with a record of nine wins, six seconds and four thirds in 21 starts with career earnings of $317,599.

In 1987, Laurel Park Racecourse named a race in her honor: the six-furlong Marshua Stakes run every February.
