= Levee (horse) =

American-bred Thoroughbred racehorse

- Sire: Hill Prince
- Grandsire: Princequillo
- Dam: Bourtai
- Damsire: Stimulus
- Sex: Mare
- Foaled: 1953
- Country: United States
- Colour: Chestnut
- Breeder: Claiborne Farm
- Owner: Vernon G. Cardy
- Trainer: Norman R. McLeod
- Record: 40: 8-6-7
- Earnings: $223,305

Major wins
- Selima Stakes (1955); Monmouth Oaks (1956); Coaching Club American Oaks (1956); Beldame Stakes (1956)

Awards
- Kentucky Broodmare of the Year (1970)
- Last updated on July 4, 2021

Levee was a Kentucky thoroughbred foaled in 1953. She was an accomplished stakes winner and the dam of the champion race mare Shuvee.

== Race career ==
Levee raced in a time before the current US stakes race grading system, so while she is technically not a graded stakes winner, many of the races she won are now graded. Her first stakes win came in the 1955 Selima Stakes during her two-year-old season. At three, she won the Monmouth Oaks after placing third several times in the Alabama Stakes, Acorn Stakes, Test Stakes and Prioress Stakes. Levee then won the Coaching Club American Oaks, described as "America's toughest stakes for 3-year-old fillies" by a neck from Princess Turia, and the Beldame Stakes both of which are now grade 1 stakes. In the latter race, she "outbattled" the Calumet Farm-owned Amoret in the stretch to win by half a length.

== Breeding career ==
Levee was a very successful broodmare. She produced 11 foals, 7 of which were winners with 4 being stakes winners. The most notable was the mare Shuvee who was a Filly Triple Crown (now called Triple Tiara) winner, a two-time Older Mare Champion and the only female to win the Jockey Club Gold Cup. Levee also produced, Nalee, a 1960 filly by Nashua who won several stakes including the Black-Eyed Susan Stakes and Santa Ynez Stakes. She also produced Royal Gunner a 1962 colt by Royal Charger, who won the Cornhusker Handicap, and A TS Olie, a 1967 filly by Mongo who won the Nassau Stakes. Levee was named Kentucky Broodmare of the Year in 1970. She produced her last foal, a filly by Arts and Letters named Artful Levee, in 1973.
