= Candy Éclair =

American Thoroughbred racehorse

- Sire: Northern Jove
- Grandsire: Northern Dancer
- Dam: Candy's Best
- Damsire: Candy Spots
- Sex: Filly
- Foaled: 1976
- Country: United States
- Colour: Gray
- Breeder: Adele W. Paxson
- Owner: Adele W. Paxson
- Trainer: S. Allen King
- Record: 23: 15-4-1
- Earnings: US$403,845

Major wins
- Brigantine Stakes (1978); Selima Stakes (1978); Mermaid Stakes (1978); Ashland Stakes (1979); Shirley Jones Stakes (1979); Endine Stakes (1980); Grey Flight Handicap (1980); Regret Handicap (1980)

Awards
- American Co-Champion Two-Year-Old Filly (1978)

Honours
- Aiken Thoroughbred Racing Hall of Fame (1979); Candy Eclair Stakes at Monmouth Park

Candy Éclair (foaled April 14, 1976 in Kentucky) was an American Thoroughbred racehorse.

== Background ==
Bred and raced by prominent Pennsylvanian horsewoman Adele Paxson, she was a granddaughter of the most important sire of the 20th century, Northern Dancer. She was out of the mare Candy's Best, a daughter of the 1963 Santa Anita Derby and Preakness Stakes winner Candy Spots.

== Racing career ==
Candy Éclair was conditioned for racing by Allen King and winter-trained at the Aiken Training Track in Aiken, South Carolina. Undefeated in all five of her starts at age two, she shared 1978 American Champion Two-Year-Old Filly honors with It's In The Air. Candy Éclair won stakes races again at age three and four, finishing her career having won fifteen of her twenty-three starts. She was elected to the Aiken Thoroughbred Racing Hall of Fame on March 17, 1979.

== Breeding record ==
As a broodmare, Candy Éclair produced five foals, none of which met with racing success.
