= Blood-Horse Publications =

American multimedia publishing house

- Parent company: The Jockey Club and the Thoroughbred Owners and Breeders Association
- Status: Active
- Founded: 1916
- Country of origin: United States
- Headquarters location: Lexington, Kentucky
- Distribution: Worldwide
- Imprints: Numerous
- Official website: BloodHorse.com

Blood-Horse Publications is an American multimedia publishing house focused on horse-related magazines headquartered in Lexington, Kentucky. It began in 1916 through its flagship magazine, The Blood-Horse. From 1961 to 2015, Blood-Horse Publications was owned by the Thoroughbred Owners and Breeders Association, a non-profit organization that promotes Thoroughbred racing and breeding. In 2015, the Jockey Club became the majority owner. According to the company, Blood-Horse has subscribers from over 80 countries worldwide, and according to ESPN is the thoroughbred industry's most-respected trade publication.

== Executive ==
Publisher & CEO

- Marla Bickel

Board of trustees

- Stuart S. Janney III – chairman
- G. Watts Humphrey Jr. – vice chairman
- Antony Beck
- D. G. Van Clief Jr.

== Publications ==
Their book-publishing arm is Eclipse Press. They also distribute a mail-order catalog of horse-related items, called Exclusively Equine that offers publications such as the Kentucky Derby Souvenir Magazine and Commemorative Collector's Issues and run several websites.

- The Blood-Horse
- TBH Marketwatch
- TBH Auction Edge
- Keeneland Magazine

== Products and services ==
- TrueNicks
- Stallion Register Online
- The Blood-Horse Source Online
