= One Count =

American-bred Thoroughbred racehorse

- Sire: Count Fleet
- Grandsire: Reigh Count
- Dam: Ace Card
- Damsire: Case Ace
- Sex: Stallion
- Foaled: 1949
- Country: United States
- Color: Dark Bay
- Breeder: Walter M. Jeffords Sr.
- Owner: Sarah F. Jeffords
- Trainer: Oscar White
- Record: 23: 9-3-3
- Earnings: $245,625

Major wins
- Jockey Club Gold Cup (1952); Empire City Gold Cup (1952); Travers Stakes (1952) U.S. Triple Crown wins: Belmont Stakes (1952)

Awards
- U.S. Champion 3-Yr-Old Colt (1952); DRF United States Horse of the Year (1952)
- Last updated on January 8, 2007

One Count (1949–1966) was an American Champion Thoroughbred racehorse. Owned and bred by Walter M. Jeffords, Sr., and raced by his wife, Sarah, he was a son of the 1943 U.S. Triple Crown Champion, Count Fleet.

== Racing career ==
One Count did not start in the Kentucky Derby, the first race of the U.S. Triple Crown series. However, under future Hall of Fame jockey Eddie Arcaro, he finished third in the Preakness Stakes then, sent off at 13/1 odds by the bettors, he won the Belmont Stakes by 2½ lengths.

En route to being voted U.S. Champion 3-Yr-Old Colt and winning United States Horse of the Year honors, One Count also won 1953's Jockey Club Gold Cup and the Travers Stakes plus he earned a second in both the Withers and Lawrence Realization Stakes. In the Horse of the Year poll conducted by the publishers of Daily Racing Form he received 19 votes to finish ahead of the two-year-old Native Dancer (6 votes) In a poll by Turf and Sport Digest magazine he finished second to Native Dancer.

Racing at age four in 1953, One Count had little success. He finished off the board in the Suburban Handicap, won by Tom Fool, and had his best effort in the Gallant Fox Handicap at Aqueduct Racetrack where he finished third.

== Stud career ==
One Count had only modest success at stud but did sire Hasty Queen II, the 1984 Broodmare of the Year in the United States.

== Sire line tree ==
- One Count
  - Sharp Count
  - Water Prince
    - Duck Dance
  - Handsome Boy
    - Arbees Boy
  - Beau Marker
