= Sensational (horse) =

American-bred Thoroughbred racehorse

- Sire: Hoist The Flag
- Grandsire: Tom Rolfe
- Dam: Meritus
- Damsire: Bold Ruler
- Sex: Mare
- Foaled: 1974
- Country: United States
- Color: Dark Bay/Brown
- Breeder: Mill House Stable
- Owner: Mill House Stable
- Trainer: Woody Stephens
- Record: 44: 9-9-9
- Earnings: US$496,395

Major wins
- Astarita Stakes (1976); Colleen Stakes (1976); Selima Stakes (1976); Frizette Stakes (1976); Ladies Handicap (1977); Hawthorne Handicap (1978)

Awards
- American Champion Two-Year-Old Filly (1976)

Honors
- Aiken Thoroughbred Racing Hall of Fame (1977)

Sensational (1974–2000) was an American National Champion Thoroughbred racemare bred and raced by the Mill House Stable of Nicholas F. Brady and his siblings.

== Racing at age two ==
Going into the month of December 1976, Sensational had had a very good campaign but was up against strong competition for the Eclipse Award with a pair of two-year-olds considered to be ahead of her. Katharine Hardin's filly Mrs. Warren had won the Schuylerville, Matron and Spinaway Stakes while Northern Sea, owned by Windfields Farm, had won the Linwood Handicap and Mermaid Stakes. Sensational defeated both in the December 11 Frizette Stakes at Belmont Park, a race that was New York state's richest stakes for fillies. Sensational then ended her 1976 campaign with another win in the Selima Stakes at Maryland's Laurel Park. She had won five of her 11 starts that year including two Grade 1 events and would be voted the Eclipse Award as the American Champion Two-Year-Old Filly of 1976.

== Racing at age three and four ==
At age three, Sensational won two of her 17 starts; her most significant win that year was the victory in the Ladies Handicap at Aqueduct Racetrack. In 1978 she won twice more out of 16 starts, including a win in the Hawthorne Handicap at California's Hollywood Park Racetrack.

== Honors ==
Sensational was selected for the Aiken Thoroughbred Racing Hall of Fame in 1977. Her trainer, Woody Stephens, was inducted into the U. S. Racing Hall of Fame in 1976.

Sensational died in 2000 at age 26.
