= De La Rose (horse) =

American-bred Thoroughbred racehorse

- Sire: Nijinsky
- Grandsire: Northern Dancer
- Dam: Rosetta Stone
- Damsire: Round Table
- Sex: Filly
- Foaled: 1978
- Country: United States
- Colour: Bay
- Breeder: Dr. & Mrs. R. Smiser West & MacKenzie Miller
- Owner: Henryk de Kwiatkowski
- Trainer: Woody Stephens
- Record: 26: 11-6-0
- Earnings: $544,647

Major wins
- Hollywood Derby (1981); Athenia Handicap (1981); Diana Handicap (1981); Saranac Stakes (1981); Long Branch Stakes (1981); E. P. Taylor Stakes (1981)

Awards
- U.S. Champion Female Turf Horse (1981)

Honours
- Aiken Thoroughbred Racing Hall of Fame (1982); De La Rose Stakes at Saratoga Race Course
- Last updated on January 14, 2008

De La Rose (1978–2001) was an American Thoroughbred racehorse. Bred in Kentucky, she was the daughter of English Triple Crown champion Nijinsky. Her grandsire was U.S. Racing Hall of Fame inductee Northern Dancer, and her damsire was another U.S. Hall of Famer, Round Table. She was purchased and raced by Henryk de Kwiatkowski, who later acquired the famed Calumet Farm in Lexington, Kentucky.

De La Rose, was voted the 1981 Eclipse Award for Outstanding Female Turf Horse, Retired to broodmare duty, she produced seven foals. On March 6, 2001, at age twenty-three, De La Rose was euthanized due to infirmities of old age.

== Pedigree ==
Pedigree of De La Rose, bay filly, March 23, 1978
| Sire Nijinsky | Northern Dancer | Nearctic | Nearco |
| Sire Nijinsky | Northern Dancer | Nearctic | Lady Angela |
| Sire Nijinsky | Northern Dancer | Natalma | Native Dancer |
| Sire Nijinsky | Northern Dancer | Natalma | Almahmoud |
| Sire Nijinsky | Flaming Page | Bull Page | Bull Lea |
| Sire Nijinsky | Flaming Page | Bull Page | Our Page |
| Sire Nijinsky | Flaming Page | Flaring Top | Menow |
| Sire Nijinsky | Flaming Page | Flaring Top | Flaming Top |
| Dam Rosetta Stone | Round Table | Princequillo | Prince Rose |
| Dam Rosetta Stone | Round Table | Princequillo | Cosquilla |
| Dam Rosetta Stone | Round Table | Knight’s Daughter | Sir Cosmo |
| Dam Rosetta Stone | Round Table | Knight’s Daughter | Feola |
| Dam Rosetta Stone | Rose Coral | Rockefella | Hyperion |
| Dam Rosetta Stone | Rose Coral | Rockefella | Rockfel |
| Dam Rosetta Stone | Rose Coral | Lady Mary Rose | Nearco |
| Dam Rosetta Stone | Rose Coral | Lady Mary Rose | Rosemain (family: 26) |
