= Moccasin (horse) =

American-bred Thoroughbred racehorse

- Moccasin's grave at Claiborne Farm
- Sire: Nantallah
- Grandsire: Nasrullah
- Dam: Rough Shod
- Damsire: Gold Bridge
- Sex: Filly
- Foaled: 16 April 1963
- Died: 1 July 1986 (aged 23)
- Country: USA
- Colour: Chestnut
- Breeder: Claiborne Farm
- Owner: Claiborne Farm
- Trainer: Harry Trotsek
- Record: 21: 11-2-4
- Earnings: $388,075

Major wins
- Spinaway Stakes (1965); Matron Stakes (1965); Selima Stakes (1965); Gardenia Stakes (1965); Test Stakes (1966); Phoenix Handicap (1967)

Awards
- U.S. Champion 2-Yr-Old Filly (1965); TSD & TRA United States Horse of the Year (1965)

Honours
- Moccasin Stakes at Hollywood Park Racetrack
- Last updated on November 12, 2006

Moccasin (April 16, 1963 – July 1, 1986) was an American Thoroughbred Champion racehorse. In a career that lasted from 1965 to 1967, she ran twenty-one times and won eleven races. She remains the only two-year-old filly to be voted United States Horse of the Year. Moccasin won only one race in each of her two subsequent seasons but was an effective performer over sprint distances.

== Background ==
Moccasin, foaled on April 16, 1963, was a chestnut filly with three white socks, bred by Claiborne Farm. Her sire, Nantallah, was a moderate racehorse by the champion Nasrullah, who in turn was sired by Nearco. Moccasin's dam, the British-bred Rough Shod, was a great success at stud, producing Ridan, Lt. Stevens (Palm Beach Stakes) and the broodmare Thong (ancestor of Sadler's Wells). Moccasin grew to be an unusually large and powerful filly, standing almost 16.2 hands high with a girth of seventy six inches.

== Racing career ==
=== 1965: two-year-old season ===
At age two, Moccasin put together an unbeaten eight-race season that culminated with her being named U.S. Horse of the Year by both Turf and Sports Digest magazine and the Thoroughbred Racing Association, beating Kelso by one vote in the latter poll. The rival poll organised by Triangle Publications was won by Roman Brother. Moccasin's performances drew attention beyond the racing media, and she was featured in the November 5 edition of Time.

After winning her first two races in "impressive fashion", Moccasin won the Spinaway Stakes at Saratoga Race Course in August, beating Swift Lady by three and a half lengths at odds of 1/5. In the following month, she appeared to have decided the title of U.S. Champion 2-Yr-Old Filly when she won the Matron Stakes at Aqueduct Race Track, finishing six lengths clear of her opponents in a time of 1:11.6. A challenger emerged in the form of Priceless Gem, who defeated Buckpasser at Aqueduct, but an injury ruled her out of a showdown with Moccasin in the Selima Stakes. In her rival's absence, Moccasin won the race by five lengths from Swift Lady. She completed her unbeaten first season in November when she recorded a two and a half-length win over Lady Pitt in the Gardenia Stakes at Garden State Park.

=== 1966: three-year-old season ===
In early 1966, Moccasin was expected to challenge the colts in the Kentucky Derby, and there were hopes that she might emulate Regret, the last filly to win the race more than fifty years earlier. After defeats in her first two races, however, A. B Hancock announced that Moccasin would bypass both the Derby and the Kentucky Oaks, saying that "she hasn't shown she is ready". At the end of May, she reappeared against fillies in the Acorn Stakes in which she started favorite but finished third to Marking Time, and a month later she finished fifth to Lady Pitt in the CCA Oaks. In August, Moccasin showed some signs of a return to form by winning a division of the seven furlong Test Stakes, but it was her only notable success of 1966. She was unable to run again that year after fracturing two sesamoid bones in training.

=== 1967: four-year-old season ===
Moccasin stayed in training in 1967 and finished second twice and third once in her first three starts. At Keeneland Race Course in April, she started slowly but recovered to win the Phoenix Handicap over six furlongs. Moccasin ran three more times without success and was retired after finishing fifth in the Equipoise Mile Handicap at Arlington Park.

== Breeding career ==
Retired to Claiborne's Marchmont Farm division in Paris, Kentucky, Moccasin was very successful as a broodmare. She produced nine foals, of which seven won graded stakes races. Her son Apalachee, sired by Round Table, raced in Europe. He was rated the 1973 Champion 2-year-old in England and Ireland and became a successful sire. Another son, Belted Earl, sired by Damascus, also raced in Europe and was named 1982's Champion Older Male and Champion Sprinter in Ireland.

== Euthanasia ==
Moccasin was euthanized on July 1, 1986, at Marchmont Farm and is buried there in the equine cemetery.
