= Johnstown (horse) =

American-bred Thoroughbred racehorse

- Sire: Jamestown
- Grandsire: St. James
- Dam: La France
- Damsire: Sir Gallahad III
- Sex: Stallion
- Foaled: 1936
- Country: United States
- Color: Bay
- Breeder: Arthur B. Hancock
- Owner: Belair Stud
- Trainer: Sunny Jim Fitzsimmons
- Record: 21: 14-0-3
- Earnings: $169,315

Major wins
- Nursery Handicap (1938); Breeders' Futurity (1938); Remsen Handicap (1938); Wood Memorial Stakes (1939); Dwyer Stakes (1939); Withers Stakes (1939); Paumonok Handicap (1939); American Classic Race wins: Kentucky Derby (1939); Belmont Stakes (1939)

Honors
- United States Racing and Hall of Fame (1992) #73 - Top 100 U.S. Racehorses of the 20th Century
- Last updated on November 16, 2006

Johnstown (March 12, 1936 – May 14, 1950) was an American Hall of Fame Thoroughbred racehorse who won two out of every three races he competed in.

== Background ==
Johnstown was a bay horse bred at Claiborne Farm. He was purchased by William Woodward Sr. and raced under his Belair Stable banner.

== Racing career ==
After a successful season racing at age two when he won seven of his twelve starts, in the spring of 1939 Johnstown gave trainer Sunny Jim Fitzsimmons his third straight Wood Memorial Stakes, an important stepping stone to the U.S. Triple Crown races.

The heavy favorite going into the Kentucky Derby, Johnstown got off to a slow start under jockey James Stout, then he took command by the mile pole and defeated Challedon by eight lengths, tying the (still current, 2015) record for margin of victory. In the Preakness Stakes, it came up muddy (he never raced on an off-track before or after), and Johnstown finished 5th to winner Challedon. With Challedon not eligible for the Belmont Stakes, Johnstown easily won the final leg of the U.S. Triple Crown races. He later won several more important races and wound up his highly successful season with seven wins in nine starts.

== Stud record ==
Retired to stud at Claiborne Farm, Johnstown met with modest success as a sire, producing winners of only six stakes races. However, he was a leading broodmare sire during the 1950s with his most famous offspring being Hall of Famer Nashua.

Johnstown died in 1950 at the age of fourteen and was buried in the equine cemetery at Claiborne Farm. He was posthumously inducted into the United States' National Museum of Racing and Hall of Fame in 1992. His portrait by artist Martin Stainforth can be seen as part of the museum's equine collection.

== Pedigree ==
Pedigree of Johnstown, chestnut stallion, 1936
Sire Jamestown	St James	Ambassador	Dark Ronald
Sire Jamestown	St James	Ambassador	Excellezza
Sire Jamestown	St James	Bobolink	Willonyx
Sire Jamestown	St James	Bobolink	Chelandry
Sire Jamestown	Mlle Dazie	Fair Play	Hastings
Sire Jamestown	Mlle Dazie	Fair Play	Fairy Gold
Sire Jamestown	Mlle Dazie	Toggery	Rock Sand
Sire Jamestown	Mlle Dazie	Toggery	Tea's Over
Dam La France	Sir Gallahad	Teddy	Ajax*
Dam La France	Sir Gallahad	Teddy	Rondeau
Dam La France	Sir Gallahad	Plucky Liege	Spearmint
Dam La France	Sir Gallahad	Plucky Liege	Concertina
Dam La France	Flambette	Durbar	Rabelais
Dam La France	Flambette	Durbar	Armenia
Dam La France	Flambette	La Flambee	Ajax*
Dam La France	Flambette	La Flambee	Medeah (family: 17-b)

* Johnstown is inbred 4D x 4D to the stallion Ajax, meaning that he appears fourth generation twice on the dam side of his pedigree.

== See also ==
- List of racehorses
