= Cravat (horse) =

American-bred Thoroughbred racehorse

- Sire: Sickle
- Grandsire: Phalaris
- Dam: Frilette
- Damsire: Man o' War
- Sex: Stallion
- Foaled: 1935
- Country: United States
- Color: Bay
- Breeder: Cornelius Vanderbilt Whitney
- Owner: Townsend B. Martin
- Trainer: Walter Burrows
- Record: 42: 9-8-10
- Earnings: US$121,305

Major wins
- Yankee Handicap (1938); Jerome Handicap (1938); Brooklyn Handicap (1939); Suburban Handicap (1939); San Juan Capistrano Handicap (1939); Jockey Club Gold Cup (1939)
- Last updated on May 3, 2010

Cravat (1935–1954) was an American record-setting Thoroughbred racehorse who won races on both dirt and turf that today are Grade 1 events. In the U.S. Triple Crown series, he finished second in the Preakness Stakes and third in the Belmont Stakes.

Cravat was sired by Sickle, the British Champion Two-Year-Old Colt whom Cravat helped become a two-time leading sire in North America. Sickle was a son of the important sire Phalaris, a two-time leading sire in Great Britain and Ireland. His dam was Frilette, a daughter of U.S. Racing Hall of Fame inductee Man o' War.

== Racing career ==
He was purchased as a two-year-old for $10,600 by New York City banker Townsend B. Martin at the 1937 C. V. Whitney dispersal sale. Racing at age three in June 1938, Cravat won the Yankee Handicap at Suffolk Downs in Boston in a track record time of 1:56 1/5 for a mile and three sixteenths miles. and at four in 1939 he set a new Santa Anita Park track record of 2:30 2/5 in winning the mile and a half San Juan Capistrano Handicap.

In early 1940, Cravat strained a tendon during a workout and was retired from racing. He stood at stud at Greentree Farm where, from a small number of offspring, he notably sired the filly Spats (b. 1945), whose wins included the Schuylerville Stakes and Diana Handicap, as well as Dr. Ole Nelson, winner of the Hawthorne Gold Cup Handicap.
