= Hill Prince =

American-bred Thoroughbred racehorse

- Sire: Princequillo
- Grandsire: Prince Rose
- Dam: Hildene
- Damsire: Bubbling Over
- Sex: Stallion
- Foaled: February 20, 1947
- Country: USA
- Colour: Bay
- Breeder: Meadow Stud, Inc.
- Owner: Christopher Chenery
- Trainer: Casey Hayes
- Record: 30:17-5-4
- Earnings: $422,140

Major wins
- Cowdin Stakes (1949); Wood Memorial Stakes (1950); Withers Stakes (1950); American Derby (1950); Jockey Club Gold Cup (1950); Jerome Handicap (1950); Sunset Handicap (1950); New York Handicap (1951); San Marcos Handicap (1952) Triple Crown wins: Preakness Stakes (1950)

Awards
- DRF American Champion Two-Year-Old Colt (1949); DRF American Champion Three-Year-Old Colt (1950); American Horse of the Year (1950); DRF & TRA American Champion Older Male Horse (1951)

Honours
- United States Racing Hall of Fame (1991) #75 - Top 100 U.S. Racehorses of the 20th Century; Hill Prince Stakes at Belmont Park
- Last updated on October 31, 2006

Hill Prince (1947–1970) was an American Thoroughbred racehorse. He was one of the leading American two-year-olds of 1949, alongside Oil Capitol and Middleground. In 1950, he ran fifteen times, winning races including the Preakness Stakes, Wood Memorial Stakes, Withers Stakes, American Derby, Jockey Club Gold Cup, Jerome Handicap and Sunset Handicap and being named American Horse of the Year. Hill Prince raced for two further seasons and had some success despite a number of injuries and training problems. He later became a moderately successful breeding stallion.

== Background ==
Hill Prince was a bay horse sired by Princequillo, a leading racehorse who became a highly successful breeding stallion. Hill Prince was one of his first crop of foals. His dam Hildene went on to produce First Landing, the American Champion Two-Year-Old Colt of 1958. The colt was bred in at his owner Christopher Chenery's Meadow Farm stud near Doswell, Virginia. Hill Prince was trained for Chenery by J. H. "Casey" Hayes.

== Racing career ==
=== 1949: two-year-old season ===
At age two Hill Prince won six of the first seven races he entered, his only defeat coming when he failed to recover from a poor start in the Sapling Stakes. At Aqueduct Race Track in September he won the Cowdin Stakes to establish himself as one of the season's leading juveniles, coming from last place on a muddy track to win by two and a half lengths from Selector in a track record time of 1:16.6. At the end of the year he was voted American Champion Two-Year-Old Colt, in the Daily Racing Form poll. In the rival Turf and Sport Digest poll he was narrowly defeated by Oil Capitol, while Middleground was top-rated in the Experimental Free Handicap.

=== 1950: three-year-old season ===
From the start of the 1950 season, Hill Prince was regarded as one of the main contenders for the Triple Crown races, along with Oil Capitol, Middleground, and the Californian colt Your Host. On his seasonal debut he won the Experimental Handicap No. 1 at Jamaica, leading to him being promoted to challenge Oil Capitol as Derby favorite. Two weeks later, however, he finished ninth behind lightly weighted Lotowhite in the Experimental Handicap No. 2 at the same track. Less than a week after this effort, Hill Prince re-established his position at the head of the Derby contenders with a two-length win over a strong field, including Middleground, in the Wood Memorial.

Ridden by Eddie Arcaro in the Kentucky Derby, Hill Prince finished second to Middleground. A week after his defeat in the Derby, Hill Prince reversed the form with Middleground when beating the Derby winner by one and a half lengths in the Withers Stakes at Belmont. Following this victory, Hill Prince started favorite for the Preakness Stakes and recorded a decisive win over Middleground, drawing away in the straight to win by five lengths from the "Texas Terror" in front of a crowd of 30,000. Shortly after his win in the Preakness, Hill Prince was matched against older horses in the Suburban Handicap and finished third to Loser Weeper, having reportedly bled from his nostrils at the finish. In the Belmont Stakes Hill Prince fought Eddie Arcaro's attempts to restrain him and took the lead in the early stages but tired badly towards the finish and finished seventh to Middleground.

Later in June, Hill Prince started favorite for the Dwyer Stakes and led by three lengths entering the straight, but was overtaken in the closing stages and beaten one and a half lengths by Greek Song. In August, Hill Prince faced a field including Your Host in the American Derby and displayed "blistering speed" in the last six furlongs to win by one and a half lengths from All Blue. In September, he won the Jerome Handicap. As usual, he was towards the back of the field in the early stages before producing a "sensational" run to take the lead in the straight and win easily. In the Jockey Club Gold Cup over two miles at Belmont in October, Hill Prince established his position as the best horse in America as he "cakewalked" to a four length victory over the Irish-bred Noor. In November, Hill Prince was sent to California to take on Your Host on the latter's home ground in the Thanksgiving Day Handicap and was beaten in a photo finish in front of "40,000 howling fans". Hill Prince stayed in California for his last two starts of the year: he finished third to Noor in the Hollywood Gold Cup and then won the Sunset Handicap, coming from the back of the field to overtake the champion filly Next Move in the closing stages. At the end of the season, Hill Prince was selected as Horse of the Year in all three major polls (Daily Racing Form, Thoroughbred Racing Association, Turf and Sport Digest).

=== 1951-1952: later career ===
In January 1951, Hill Prince sustained a broken bone in his right hind leg when being prepared for the Santa Anita Maturity and was forced to miss the first eight months of the season. In September, he returned to run third in an allowance race at Aqueduct Race Track and then carried top weight to a five length victory in the New York Handicap at Belmont. In the following month Hill Prince failed to repeat his win in the Jockey Club Gold Cup when he was caught close to the finish and narrowly beaten by Counterpoint. A week later, Hill Prince again finished fourth to Call Over in the Trenton Handicap. Hill Prince's performances were still good enough to be voted 1951's Handicap Horse of the Year in the Daily Racing Form and Thoroughbred Racing Association polls. The Turf and Sport Digest award was won by Citation.

As a five-year-old, Hill Prince won the San Marcos Handicap at Santa Anita in February, but finished fifth when favorite for the Santa Anita Handicap. Subsequent examinations revealed "filling" in the horse's right foreleg and Hill Prince was retired to stud.

== Stud record ==
Hill Prince stood at the Claiborne Farm where he sired twenty-three stakes race winners including the 1957 American Champion Three-Year-Old Filly Bayou as well as Coaching Club American Oaks winner Levee and the Gardenia Stakes winner Pepperwood. He was more important as a sire of broodmares and was the damsire of Hall of Fame horses, Shuvee and Dark Mirage. Hill Prince died in 1970 and was interred at the Meadow Stud, next to Sun Beau.

In 1991 Hill Prince was inducted into the National Museum of Racing and Hall of Fame.

== Pedigree ==
Pedigree of Hill Prince
Sire Princequillo	Prince Rose	Rose Prince	Prince Palatine
Sire Princequillo	Prince Rose	Rose Prince	Eglantine
Sire Princequillo	Prince Rose	Indolence	Gay Crusader
Sire Princequillo	Prince Rose	Indolence	Barrier
Sire Princequillo	Cosquilla	Papyrus	Tracery
Sire Princequillo	Cosquilla	Papyrus	Miss Matty
Sire Princequillo	Cosquilla	Quick Thought	White Eagle
Sire Princequillo	Cosquilla	Quick Thought	Mindful
Dam Hildene	Bubbling Over	North Star	Sunstar
Dam Hildene	Bubbling Over	North Star	Angelic
Dam Hildene	Bubbling Over	Beaming Beauty	Sweep
Dam Hildene	Bubbling Over	Beaming Beauty	Bellisario
Dam Hildene	Fancy Racket	Wrack	Robert le Diable
Dam Hildene	Fancy Racket	Wrack	Samphire
Dam Hildene	Fancy Racket	Ultimate Fancy	Ultimus
Dam Hildene	Fancy Racket	Ultimate Fancy	Idle Fancy (Family 9-b)
