= Oscar White =

American horse trainer

Personal information
- Born: August 27, 1908 Pittsville, Maryland
- Died: April 7, 1983 (aged 74) Pittsville, Maryland
- Resting place: Pittsville Cemetery, Pittsville, Maryland
- Occupation: Trainer

Horse racing career
- Sport: Horse racing
- Career wins: Not found

Major racing wins
- Saratoga Special Stakes (1942, 1944); Belmont Futurity Stakes (1944); Hopeful Stakes (1944); Jersey Derby (1945, 1946); Whitney Handicap (1945); Jerome Handicap (1946); Jockey Club Gold Cup (1946, 1952); Massachusetts Handicap (1946); Peter Pan Stakes (1946); Questionnaire Handicap (1946); Travers Stakes (1946, 1952, 1958); Wilson Stakes (1946); Beldame Stakes (1947); Potomac Handicap (1947); Edgemere Handicap (1948); Havre de Grace Handicap (1948); Manhattan Handicap (1948); National Stallion Stakes (filly division) (1948); Saratoga Cup (1948); Saratoga Handicap (1948); Empire City Gold Cup (1949, 1952); Monmouth Oaks (1949); Acorn Stakes (1951); Alabama Stakes (1951); Delaware Oaks (1951); Gazelle Stakes (1951); Delaware Handicap (1950, 1952); Firenze Handicap (1953); Molly Pitcher Stakes (1969); Maskette Handicap (1969); Gardenia Stakes (1970) American Classic Race wins: Belmont Stakes (1945, 1952)

Honors
- Delaware Park Racetrack Wall of Fame

Significant horses
- Pavot, One Count, Kiss Me Kate

Oscar Russell White (August 27, 1908 – April 7, 1983) was an American Thoroughbred horse racing trainer who twice won the third leg of the United States Triple Crown of Thoroughbred Racing. In 1941, he took over training duties for the prominent racing stable of Walter and Sarah Jeffords when Buddy Hirsch left to serve in World War II with the United States Army.

Oscar White's best horses were:

- Pavot – undefeated 1944 American Champion Two-Year-Old Male Horse and winner of the 1945 Belmont Stakes
- Kiss Me Kate – voted 1951 American Champion Three-Year-Old Filly
- One Count – won 1952 Belmont Stakes, voted 1952 American Horse of the Year

In 2011, Oscar White was elected to Delaware Park Racetrack's Wall of Fame.
