= Mahubah =

American-bred Thoroughbred racehorse

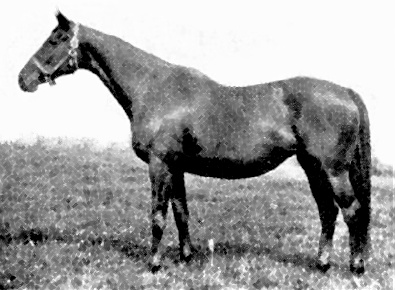
- Mahubah
- Sire: Rock Sand
- Grandsire: Sainfoin
- Dam: Merry Token
- Damsire: Merry Hampton
- Sex: Mare
- Foaled: 1910
- Died: 1931 (age 21)
- Country: United States
- Colour: Bay
- Breeder: August Belmont, Jr.
- Owner: August Belmont, Jr.
- Trainer: Sam Hildreth
- Record: 5:1–0–1
- Earnings: $390

Mahubah (1910–1931) was an American bred Thoroughbred Racehorse and broodmare. She is most famous for producing Man o' War, who won 20 races out of 21 starts, and later became leading sire himself.

== Background ==
She was a bay mare, foaled in Kentucky and owned and bred by August Belmont, Jr.

Mahubah was by the imported English Triple Crown winner Rock Sand (GB), and her dam was Merry Token (GB) (minor stakes winner in England) by The Derby winner Merry Hampton. Mahubah was a half-sister to the stakes winner Tactics, by Hastings, and a sister to the stakes winner Sand Mole.

Mahubah had five starts, with a win in a maiden race and one third, for earnings of $390 before she was retired.

== Breeding Career ==
She was retired to broodmare duty in Lexington, Kentucky and she produced five foals, all by Fair Play. Mahubah's first foal was Masda, a 1915 filly. Masda won six races, was the dam of three stakes winners, and later became the third dam of the American Triple Crown winner Assault. The most notable of Mahubah's offspring was Man o' War, who ranked No.1 in the Blood-Horse magazine List of the Top 100 U.S. Racehorses of the 20th Century. Mahubah also produced My Play, who won the 1923 Aqueduct Handicap and the 1924 Jockey Club Gold Cup and later became a good sire.

Mahubah died in 1931 at age 21 and was buried next to Fair Play at Elmendorf Farm.

Owing to the success of her descendants she was listed as a Cluster Mare, which is a Thoroughbred brood mare that has produced two or more winners of five or more of the eight most important and valuable races, within six generations.

== See also ==
- List of racehorses
