= The Blood-Horse =

American horse racing magazine

- Editor: Claire Crosby
- Former editors: Evan Hammonds, Eric Mitchell, Dan Liebman, Ray Paulick, Ed Bowen, Kent Hollingsworth, Joe Estes, Thomas Cromwell
- Frequency: Monthly
- Founder: Thoroughbred Horse Association
- First issue: 1916
- Company: Blood-Horse Publications
- Country: United States
- Based in: Lexington, Kentucky
- Language: English
- Website: http://www.bloodhorse.com/
- ISSN: 0006-4998

The Blood-Horse (also referred to simply as Blood-Horse and displayed on its nameplate in upright all-capital letters without hyphenation as BLOODHORSE) is an American horse racing news magazine based in Lexington, Kentucky. Founded in 1916, it covers "race reporting, comprehensive analysis, events, trends, debate, farm management, pedigrees, people, profiles, medication issues, investigative reports, and breeding news and information, and anything newsworthy and important to the racing and breeding industry".

The Blood-Horse originated as a monthly bulletin of the Thoroughbred Horse Association. In 1935 the publication was purchased by the American Thoroughbred Breeders Association. From 1961 to 2015, it was owned by the Thoroughbred Owners and Breeders Association (TOBA), a non-profit organization that promotes Thoroughbred racing, breeding, and ownership. The publication was issued by a subsidiary called Blood-Horse Publications from 2000 to 2015. In February 2015, the Jockey Club purchased a majority share in the publication. The magazine and website are now published by a partnership entity of the Jockey Club Information Systems and TOBA called Blood-Horse LLC.

The similarly titled Australian Bloodhorse Review is unaffiliated.

== History ==
In 1916, the first Kentucky Thoroughbred Horse Association Bulletin was posted – Volume 1, Number 1 was published August 1, 1916, by the Kentucky Thoroughbred Horse Association to serve a small community of breeders. The Bulletin was renamed The Blood-Horse and taken to a weekly frequency in 1929 and expanded to serve a global audience. The first issue of the public The Blood-Horse was published May 11, 1929, and held Blue Larkspur as the cover image.

The last of the original members that published The Blood-Horse was Thomas Piatt; A charter member in 1916, former VP of the old Thoroughbred Horse Association, and director of American Thoroughbred Breeders Association. He was also the founding member of the Thoroughbred Owners and Breeders Association.

Thomas Cromwell was the first editor of magazine. Joe Estes joined The Blood-Horse in 1930 and later became the second editor-in-chief. He was succeeded by Kent Hollingsworth, Ed Bowen, Ray Paulick and Dan Liebman.

The magazine won acclaim for its exclusive report indicating that 1986 Kentucky Derby winner Ferdinand had been slaughtered by his owners overseas after a marginal stud career. The news resulted in increased efforts to save retired racehorses.

In 2003, William Nack of ESPN referred to The Blood-Horse as "the thoroughbred industry's most-respected trade publication".

For the new millennium, the magazine compiled a List of the Top 100 Racehorses of the 20th Century which was expanded into a book form.

The corresponding online website publication is Bloodhorse.com. In August 2015 Blood-Horse Daily was launched, with content available on an app, by email subscription or downloadable from the website. In April 2021, the magazine returned to a monthly schedule in April 2021.

Books

- Horse Racing's Top 100 Moments by The Blood-Horse Staff. Blood-Horse Publications (2006) ISBN 1-58150-139-0
- Thoroughbred Champions: Top 100 Racehorses of the 20th Century by The Blood-Horse Staff. Eclipse Press (1999) ISBN 1-58150-024-6
- Handicapping the Wall Street Way by Mark Ripple. (2005) ISBN 1-58150-126-9

== See also ==
- Average Earnings Index (horse racing)
