= Questionnaire (horse) =

American-bred Thoroughbred racehorse

- Sire: Sting
- Grandsire: Spur
- Dam: Miss Puzzle
- Damsire: Disguise
- Sex: Stallion
- Foaled: 1927
- Country: United States
- Color: Bay
- Breeder: James Butler
- Owner: James Butler
- Trainer: 1) Andy Schuttinger (1929, 1930); 2) Edward J. Bennett (1931, 1932)
- Record: 45: 19-8-4
- Earnings: US$89,611

Major wins
- Broadway Handicap (1930); Empire City Derby (1930); Gramatan Handicap (1930); Mount Kisco Stakes (1930); Mount Vernon Handicap (1930); Scarsdale Handicap (1930); Twin City Handicap (1930); Yonkers Handicap (1930); Yorktown Handicap (1930); Brooklyn Handicap (1931); Metropolitan Handicap (1931); Empire City Handicap (1931); Fair Play Handicap (1931); Kings County Handicap (1932); Paumonok Handicap (1932)

Honors
- Questionnaire Handicap at Empire City

Questionnaire (1927–1950) was an American Thoroughbred racehorse bred and raced by James Butler, president and owner of Empire City Race Track, who owned his sire Sting and grandsire Spur.

Questionnaire was race conditioned by Andy Schuttinger, who was his trainer through 1930, after which Edward J. Bennett took over.

Questionnaire had an outstanding year at age three. Although he did not run in the first two legs of the 1930 U.S. Triple Crown series, he finished third to Triple Crown champion Gallant Fox in the Belmont Stakes. Overall, he won nine important races in 1930 and then in 1931 captured the prestigious Brooklyn, Empire City and Metropolitan Handicaps.

== At stud ==
After two more important wins in 1932 at age five, Questionnaire was retired to stud for owner James Butler. However, Butler died in 1934 and his estate sold Questionnaire at auction. He was purchased for $15,000 by Helen Hay Whitney's Greentree Stud, Inc. for whom he served stallion duty at their breeding farm in Lexington, Kentucky. Among the successful runners he sired was Stefanita, the 1943 American Champion Three-Year-Old Filly, and multiple stakes winners Hash (1936), Requested (1939), Coincidence (1942), Carolyn A. (1944), and Double Brandy (1946).

Questionnaire died of colic at age twenty-three on August 25, 1950.

== Sire line tree ==
- Questionnaire
  - Hash
  - Requested
  - Coincidence
  - Free For All
    - Rough'n Tumble
      - Yes You Will
      - Conestoga
      - Flag Raiser
      - Dr. Fager
        - Tree of Knowledge
        - Dr. Patches
      - Minnesota Mac
        - Great Above
        - Mac Diarmida
      - Ruffled Feathers
  - Double Brandy

== Pedigree ==
Pedigree of Questionnaire
Sire Sting	Spur	King James	Plaudit*
Sire Sting	Spur	King James	Unsightly
Sire Sting	Spur	Auntie Mum	Melton
Sire Sting	Spur	Auntie Mum	Adderly
Sire Sting	Gnat	Voter	Friar's Balsam
Sire Sting	Gnat	Voter	Mavourneen
Sire Sting	Gnat	Mosquito	Commando*
Sire Sting	Gnat	Mosquito	Sandfly
Dam Miss Puzzle	Disguise	Domino*	Himyar*
Dam Miss Puzzle	Disguise	Domino*	Mannie Gray*
Dam Miss Puzzle	Disguise	Bonnie Gal	Galopin
Dam Miss Puzzle	Disguise	Bonnie Gal	Bonnie Doon
Dam Miss Puzzle	Ruby Nethersole	Star Ruby	Hampton
Dam Miss Puzzle	Ruby Nethersole	Star Ruby	Ornament
Dam Miss Puzzle	Ruby Nethersole	Nethersole	Tournament
Dam Miss Puzzle	Ruby Nethersole	Nethersole	Fairy Slipper

* Questionnaire is inbred 5S x 3D to the stallion Domino, meaning that he appears fifth generation (via Commando) on the sire side of his pedigree, and third generation on the dam side of his pedigree.

* Questionnaire is inbred 5S x 6S x 4D to the stallion Himyar, meaning that he appears fifth generation (via Plaudit) and sixth generation (via Commando) on the sire side of his pedigree, and fourth generation on the dam side of his pedigree.
