= Himyar (disambiguation) =

The Himyarite Kingdom was a kingdom in ancient Yemen.

Himyar may also refer to:

- Himyar (horse), an American thoroughbred racehorse
- Himyar, Kentucky, a community in Knox County, Kentucky
