= Top row =

Top row may refer to:

- Top Row, a racehorse
- the top row of keys above the home row on a keyboard
