= Dr. Fager =

American Thoroughbred racehorse

- Sire: Rough'n Tumble
- Grandsire: Free For All
- Dam: Aspidistra
- Damsire: Better Self
- Sex: Stallion
- Foaled: April 6, 1964; Florida
- Died: August 5, 1976 (aged 12)
- Country: United States
- Color: Bay
- Breeder: Tartan Farms
- Owner: Tartan Stable. Racing silks: Red, tartan sash, red and tartan cap.
- Trainer: John A. Nerud
- Record: 22: 18-2-1
- Earnings: $1,002,642

Major wins
- Cowdin Stakes (1966); Gotham Stakes (1967); Withers Stakes (1967); Arlington Classic (1967); New Hampshire Sweepstakes Classic (1967); Hawthorne Gold Cup (1967); Vosburgh Stakes (1967, 1968); Roseben Handicap (1968); Californian Stakes (1968); Suburban Handicap (1968); Whitney Handicap (1968); Washington Park Handicap (1968); United Nations Handicap (1968)

Awards
- American Champion Sprint Horse (1967, 1968); DRF American Champion Male Turf Horse (1968); American Champion Older Male Horse (1968); American Horse of the Year (1968); Leading sire in North America (1977)

Honors
- U.S. Racing Hall of Fame (1971) #6 - Top 100 U.S. Racehorses of the 20th Century; Dr. Fager Stakes at Calder Race Course

Dr. Fager (April 6, 1964 – August 5, 1976) was an American thoroughbred racehorse who had what many consider one of the greatest single racing seasons by any horse in the history of the sport. In 1968 at the age of four, he became the only horse to ever hold four American titles in one year when he was named the Horse of the Year, champion handicap horse, champion sprinter, and co-champion grass horse. In his most famous performance, Dr. Fager set a world record of 1:32 1/5 for a mile in the Washington Park Handicap while carrying 134 pounds.

Dr. Fager was also a major winner at ages two and three. At two, he won four of five starts including the Cowdin Stakes. Various health issues kept him out of the Triple Crown races at age three but he still won seven stakes races while setting track records in the New Hampshire Sweepstakes and Rockingham Special. He was named the champion sprinter of 1967 after defeating older horses in the Vosburgh Handicap. He also finished third behind Damascus and Buckpasser in the "race of the decade", the Woodward Stakes.

Upon retirement to stud in Florida, he became an important sire and broodmare sire, and led the North American sire list in 1977. He died young due to a colic attack at the age of twelve.

Dr. Fager was inducted into the National Museum of Racing and Hall of Fame in 1971. On the Blood-Horse magazine List of the Top 100 U.S. Racehorses of the 20th Century, he was ranked #6.

== Background ==
Dr. Fager was a homebred for Tartan Stable, owned by William L. McKnight (chairman of the board of Minnesota Mining and Manufacturing Co.) and managed by Hall of Famer John Nerud. Nerud, who owned 25% of Dr. Fager and was his trainer, developed Tartan Stable from "literally nothing" into a prominent racing stable. Dr. Fager was from the first crop of Tartan Farm's Rough'n Tumble, a good racehorse with soundness problems and dubious breeding. Thanks in part to Dr. Fager, Rough'n Tumble developed into a leading regional sire in Florida, preserving the now-rare sire line of Plaudit, the Kentucky Derby winner of 1898. Dr. Fager's dam Aspidistra earned only two wins during her racing career and could have been claimed for only $6,500 in her last start. As a broodmare though, she produced 10 winners, including two Hall of Famers: Dr. Fager and his younger half-sister Ta Wee.

Dr. Fager was a bay horse who stood 16.2 hands (66 inches, 168 cm) high. Known for his fluid stride, he had a troublesome right knee and clubbed forefeet that required constant care. He was named for the Boston neurosurgeon, Dr. Charles Anthony Fager, who saved Nerud's life with two operations after Nerud suffered a serious fall from a horse.

== Racing career ==
Dr. Fager made 22 starts, winning 18 times with two second-place finishes and one show. The only time he was out of the money was as a result of a disqualification in the Jersey Derby, in which he finished first. Only three horses ever finished in front of Dr. Fager: Champion juvenile male Successor, Horse of the Year Damascus, and Horse of the Year Buckpasser. His headstrong nature was considered his only weakness as a racehorse. "He was very easy to train, a very willing and smart horse," said Nerud. "He also was very sensitive. He didn't want you to raise your voice to him, and he didn't want anyone whipping him. If something didn't suit Dr. Fager, he would let you know immediately."

=== 1966: Two-year-old season ===
Dr. Fager raced five times at age two, winning four of them and finishing second in the other. He won his first start at Aqueduct on July 15, 1966 by seven lengths, then won an allowance race at Saratoga in August by eight lengths. He was then entered the World's Playground Stakes at Atlantic City on September 10. After breaking slowly, Dr. Fager rushed up through the pack and moved to the lead. He was kept under a snug hold down the backstretch, then responded to a challenge from Glengarry around the far turn and pulled away down the stretch, eventually winning by twelve lengths.

In his next start in the Cowdin Stakes on October 5, he faced much more challenging competition including stakes winners Diplomat Way, Forgotten Way, In Reality and eventual champion two-year-old Successor. He was made the 5-2 morning-line favorite but by post time, his odds has shortened to 4-5. Dr. Fager got left at the start and was then rushed to get back in touch with the field. On the turn, he had to be checked hard when he nearly clipped heels with the leaders. Down the stretch, he tried to bear out then "gawked at crowd" for the final sixteenth of a mile. Despite all this, he still won by three-quarters of a length over In Reality with Successor in third.

Dr. Fager suffered his first defeat in the Champagne Stakes on October 15. He led from the start but was passed in the stretch by Successor, who went on to win by a length in a time of 1:35, just one-fifth of a second off the stakes record held by Count Fleet. His jockey Bill Shoemaker said, "I thought Dr. Fager was the winner at the head of the stretch, but I guess the pace was too much, and he got tired at the end." A Hall of Fame jockey, Shoemaker would state that Dr. Fager was too headstrong for him to control.

=== 1967: Three-year-old season ===
Dr. Fager's return to the racetrack at age three was delayed due to a virus. He made his first start of the year in the Gotham Stakes on April 15, where he faced off for the first time with Damascus, who had previously won the Bay Shore Stakes. Both horses went off at odds of 6-5, with slightly more bet on Damascus in the win pool. Damascus rated just behind the early pace-setter with Dr. Fager close behind in third. In the turn, Damascus moved to the lead but Dr. Fager closed ground steadily, hitting the lead at the top of the stretch. He ultimately won by half a length in a time of 1:35 1/5 for the mile.

Despite the win, Nerud surprised many by announcing the colt would not run in the Kentucky Derby on May 6, instead entering Dr. Fager in the Withers Stakes on May 13. Dr. Fager responded with a brilliant six length win, completing the mile in a stakes record 1:33 4/5. At the time, it was the fastest mile ever run by a three-year-old in New York state.

With the Preakness Stakes being held only one week after the Withers, Nerud decided to bypass that race and entered the colt in the Jersey Derby on May 30 instead. Dr. Fager finished first by 6 1/2 lengths but was subsequently disqualified to fourth place for crossing in front of the field going into the first turn. It was a controversial decision, prompted perhaps by the reputation of jockey, Manuel Ycaza, who was substituting for his regular jockey Braulio Baeza. Dr. Fager's time for 1 1/8 miles was 1:48 flat, which would have been a stakes record.

Dr. Fager returned in the Arlington Classic on June 24. Despite racing over a sloppy track for the first time and breaking poorly, Dr. Fager won with ease by ten lengths. "He has an awful lot of early speed," said Baeza, "and he's willing to run at any time in a race. He's willing to run from start to finish."

On July 25, Dr. Fager won the Rockingham Special by four lengths, completing the distance of 1 1/8 miles in a time of 1:48 1/5, lowering the Rockingham Park track record by a full second. His next scheduled start was the Travers Stakes on August 19 but he suffered a recurrence of the virus that had sidelined him at the beginning of the year and missed the race.

Dr. Fager made his next start on September 2 at Rockingham Park in the New Hampshire Sweepstakes Classic, then the world's richest horse race for three-year-olds. In his first start at 1 1/4 miles, Dr. Fager set the early pace but was passed by In Reality with a half mile to go. Dr. Fager fought back and went on to win by 1 3/4 lengths. His time of 1:59 4/5 was a new track record.

"Dr. Fager had brilliant speed, but not equal brilliance in knowing how to use it."

— Blood-Horse editor Edward Bowen

Dr. Fager's win made him a potential horse of the year candidate, but first he would have to beat Buckpasser, the defending horse of the year, and Damascus, whose three-year-old campaign included wins in the Preakness, Belmont and Travers Stakes. The three horses finally met in the Woodward Stakes at Aqueduct on September 30, with Buckpasser going off as the favorite. The field also included two "rabbits", Hedevar and Great Power, who were entered to set a fast pace in the hopes of tiring out Dr. Fager in order to set up the race for their stablemates, Damascus and Buckpasser respectively. The race played out as expected, with Dr. Fager going to the early lead while pressed by Hedevar with Great Power in third. Dr. Fager set very fast opening fractions of :22 2/5 for the first quarter-mile and :45 1/5 for the half. After three-quarters of a mile, Dr. Fager started to draw away from the rabbits, who would finish fifth and sixth respectively. On the far turn however, Buckpasser and Damascus started to close ground. Damascus swept by Dr. Fager to win by ten lengths while setting a track record for 1 1/4 miles. Buckpasser and Dr. Fager dueled down the stretch for second, with Buckpasser prevailing by half a length.

The race, which proved decisive in the Horse of the Year voting, was subsequently dubbed the "race of the decade" and was voted the #39 position in Horse Racing's Top 100 Moments, a review of North American racing in the 20th century compiled by The Blood-Horse.

On October 21, Dr. Fager won the Hawthorne Gold Cup by 2 1/2 lengths. The rider of the second-place finisher claimed foul, saying that Dr. Fager had interfered with his horse in the far turn. The stewards reviewed the tape but could find no evidence of contact so the result stood. Baeza said, "I don't know what (the other jockey) is talking about. Dr. Fager was going just like I wanted him to. I thought he could do anything I called on him for at any time in the race. He never was in trouble at any time."

Dr. Fager finished the year as the heavy 1–5 favorite in the Vosburgh Stakes on November 7, run that year at Aqueduct, despite carrying the top weight of 128 pounds and conceding from 6 to 19 pounds to older horses. He raced in fifth during the early part of the race then moved to the lead in the stretch, eventually winning by four lengths. His time of 1:21 3/5 was just off the stakes record set by Bold Ruler at Belmont Park. Although this was his only start of the year at a distance of less than a mile, Dr. Fager was named the champion sprinter of 1967.

=== 1968: Four-year-old season ===
In 2014, the Daily Racing Form called Dr. Fager's four-year-old campaign a "season for the ages", a sentiment echo by many sportswriters. Never carrying less than 130 pounds, Dr. Fager won seven of eight starts, set a world record for the mile and broke the American record for seven furlongs.

Dr. Fager had a long layoff and then returned to training in the spring. By late April, he was training so well that he set a track record for five furlongs of :56 4/5 during a between-the-races workout at Aqueduct. He made his first start of 1968 in the Roseben Handicap at Aqueduct on May 4, winning by three lengths while carrying 130 pounds. He came within a fifth of a second of the track record for seven furlongs despite running under a tight hold. "I tried to hold him a little bit at the start," said jockey John Rotz, substituting for Baeza. "I just couldn't take him back. I just sat there."

He was then entered in the Californian Stakes at Hollywood Park on May 18, where Nerud had anticipated receiving a break in the weight the horse would have to carry. After arriving in California however, it was determined that under the allowance conditions of the race, Dr. Fager would once again have to carry 130 pounds. Reunited with Braulio Baeza, he overtook the early leader on the final turn and drew off to win by three lengths over champion filly Gamely.

Dr. Fager's next scheduled start was the Metropolitan Handicap, in which he would have been the heavy favorite despite being assigned 134 pounds. On the day before the race though, he suffered a serious attack of colic shortly after his morning workout. "I noticed a violent reaction as soon as he came back," said Nerud, "and I can tell you I was scared to death. That horse had never given me a bit of real trouble, and now I saw that he was really sick."

Dr. Fager responded well to treatment and his veterinarian confirmed no permanent damage had been done. After a brief break, he returned in the Suburban Handicap on July 4 where he carried 132 pounds. The race was a highly anticipated face-off with old rival Damascus, assigned 133 pounds. Going off as the 4-5 favorite, Dr. Fager went to the early lead and set sensible fractions, in part because Damascus's "rabbit" Hedevar had been scratched from the race. Baeza carefully nursed Dr. Fager's speed, then allowed him to draw away in the stretch to win by two lengths with Damascus back in third. The time of 1:59 3/5 for 10 furlongs was a stakes record and equaled the track record.

Nerud next planned to run Dr. Fager in the Haskell Handicap at Monmouth Park on July 13, but withdrew when the horse was assigned 134 pounds. Instead he decided to wait for the Brooklyn Handicap on July 20, only to receive a career-high assignment of 135 pounds. The challenge was compounded by the presence of Damascus, whose assignment was dropped from 133 in the Suburban to 130 pounds. The "rabbit" Hedevar went to the early lead, followed closely by Dr. Fager who was unwilling to rate. The two set blistering early fractions, completing the half mile in :45 1/5. The fast pace set up the race for Damascus, who closed ground quickly in the stretch and won by 2 1/2 lengths. Dr. Fager held on for second while Hedevar finished last.

Dr. Fager made his next start in the Whitney Stakes on August 3, where he received "only" 132 pounds under the allowance conditions of the race. Facing only three rivals, each of whom carried 114 pounds, he went off at odds of 1–20 (the legal minimum). Dr. Fager went to the early lead and set sensible fractions, completing the half mile in :47 1/5 (two seconds slower than the pace in the Brooklyn.) Under a hand ride, his margin increased down the stretch to eight lengths at the finish. Despite the high weight and lack of competition, his time for 1 1/8 miles was 1:48 3/5, just three-fifths off of the track record.

==== World record ====
Dr. Fager made his next start on August 24 in the Washington Park Handicap at Arlington Park under 134 pounds. Damascus was also being considered for the race but was withdrawn because his trainer felt the distance of a mile favored Dr. Fager. Despite extremely high heat and humidity in the Chicago area, Dr. Fager was in excellent spirits before the race. When asked by a local television crew to describe the colt, Nerud responded, "I guess he'd be like a golfer who scored 62 every time he played."

Arlington Park has a long chute on the backstretch, meaning the runners would only have to go around one-turn to complete the mile. As a result, a fast time was anticipated despite Dr. Fager's high weight assignment. Nerud doubted though that Dr. Fager could match the existing world record of 1:32 3/5 set at Arlington Park in 1966 by Buckpasser while carrying 125 pounds. "Those things aren't important to me," he said when asked about setting the record. "I'm only interested in winning and you just try to handle a horse the best way you can to get him to win."

Dr. Fager went off at odds of 3–10 while spotting his rivals between 16 and 23 pounds. During a fast opening quarter mile of 22 2/5 seconds, Baeza rated him in sixth place while keeping him out of traffic problems on the outside of the pack. He then started to make up ground, moving up to second as the half-mile was completed in a stunning 44 seconds flat. Considering the ground he made up moving from sixth to second, Dr. Fager is estimated to have completed the second quarter in a blistering 20 3/5 seconds, believed to be the fastest quarter-mile ever run in a non-sprint race.

As they moved into the turn, Dr. Fager moved to the lead then started to open up ground on his rivals. He completed six furlongs in 1:07 3/5 with a lead of 1 1/2 lengths. In the stretch, Baeza was motionless but Dr. Fager continued to draw away, winning by ten lengths. He completed the mile in 1:32 1/5, breaking the world record by two-fifths of a second. After the finish, the track announcer, Phil Georgeff, paused for a few seconds and then said just one word after noticing the time: "Wow." He later explained, "He was just galloping through the stretch and was running so effortlessly that I had forgotten all about the record, especially since he was carrying 134 pounds. When I saw the time I was shocked."

Baeza was also surprised by the performance. "I never in any of his races knew how fast he was going," he said. "He moved so smoothly and his action was so fluid I felt like I was in a Lear Jet. All I knew was that he was going faster than the rest of them. I'd try to slow him down, but he'd still pull away from them."

Nerud called it a "Babe Ruth performance". Dr. Fager's time would stand as the world record on any surface for 29 years. It still stands as the American record for a mile on the dirt. The race was ranked #7 in The Blood-Horse list of the Horse Racing's Top 100 Moments of the 20th century.

The record has since been tied because of a rule regarding fractions of seconds in timing horse races. In 1968, Arlington Park used a timing system that counted by fifths of a second. On May 7, 2003, Najran won the Westchester Handicap, a one mile race over one turn at Belmont Park, which has timed in hundredths since 1991, with a 1:32.24. Since the timing accuracy was only to fifths in 1968 compared to hundredths in 2003, the mark is declared to be tied. For the record to be broken, a horse would have to run 1:32.19 or faster.

==== Aftermath ====
For his next start, Nerud decided to try the colt on the turf for the first time in the United Nations Handicap on September 11. The field included 1967 champion turf horse (and future Horse of the Year) Fort Marcy, Australian champion Tobin Bronze and multiple stakes winner Flit-to. Dr. Fager was assigned 134 pounds, spotting his rivals from 12 to 23 pounds. Despite this, Nerud's only concern was the weather, fearing that soft going would blunt Dr. Fager's natural speed. Elliott Burch, the trainer of Fort Marcy, foresaw additional problems. "It's been my experience that speed horses on the dirt are usually not turf horses," he said. "They can't handle the turns. They tend to run out, and I think 'Fager' is going to have his problems keeping from racing wide."

On raceday, the turf was firm but somewhat slippery and Dr. Fager had trouble maintaining his stride. He went to the early lead and was challenged closely by longshot Advocator, who poked a nose in front down the backstretch. Dr. Fager moved back to the lead, only to be passed again by Advocator. At the top of the stretch, Fort Marcy made a move, only to run into traffic problems. In deep stretch, Advocator looked the likely winner but Dr. Fager fought back and prevailed by a neck in the final stride. "My horse is not a grass horse," said Nerud. "He won on class and heart alone."

On November 2, Dr. Fager made his final start in the Vosburgh Stakes, in which he was assigned 139 pounds, the highest weight ever assigned by track handicapper Tommy Trotter in a regular stakes event. Dr. Fager broke in fourth place but soon moved up to challenge for the lead. He completed the half-mile in 43 4/5 seconds then started to draw away, eventually winning by six lengths. He completed the seven furlongs in 1:20 1/5, a new track record by a full second and just one-fifth of a second off the world record.

At the end of 1968, Dr. Fager swept the Horse of the Year awards, topping the polls organised by the Thoroughbred Racing Association, the Daily Racing Form and the Turf and Sport Digest. He was also named outstanding sprinter, champion handicap horse and co-champion turf horse.

== Race Record ==
Lifetime: 22-18-2-1 Earnings: $1,002,642
Date	Track	Race	Distance (Furlongs)	Finish	Margin (lengths)	Time	Jockey	Winner (Runner-Up)
1966 (2-year-old season)
7/15/1966	Aqueduct	Maiden Special Weight	5 1/2 (fast)	1st	7	1:05	D. Hidalgo	(Lift Off)
8/13/1966	Saratoga	Allowance	6 (fast)	1st	8	1:10 2/5	D. Hidalgo	(Bandera Road)
9/10/1966	Atlantic City	World's Playground	7 (fast)	1st	12	1:23	M. Ycaza	(Glengary)
10/5/1966	Aqueduct	Cowdin Stakes	7 (good)	1st	3/4	1:24 2/5	W. Shoemaker	(In Reality)
10/15/1966	Aqueduct	Champagne Stakes	8 (fast)	2nd	1 (behind)	1:35	W. Shoemaker	Successor
1967 (3-year-old season)
4/15/1967	Aqueduct	Gotham Stakes	8 (fast)	1st	1/2	1:35 1/5	M. Ycaza	(Damascus)
5/13/1967	Aqueduct	Withers Stakes	8 (fast)	1st	6	1:33 4/5 (Note: Set a stakes record)	B. Baeza	(Tumiga)
5/30/1967	Garden State Park	Jersey Derby	9 (fast)	1st (Note: Dr. Fager was disqualified to 4th place)	6 1/2	1:48	M. Ycaza	(In Reality)
6/24/1967	Arlington Park	Arlington Classic	8 (sloppy)	1st	10	1:36	B. Baeza	(Lightning Orphan)
7/15/1967	Rockingham Park	Rockingham Special	9 (fast)	1st	4 1/4	1:48 1/5 (Note: Set a track record)	B. Baeza	(Reason to Hail)
9/2/1967	Rockingham Park	New Hampshire Sweepstakes	10 (fast)	1st	1	1:59 4/5 (Note: Set a track record)	B. Baeza	(In Reality)
9/30/1967	Aqueduct	Woodward Stakes	10 (fast)	3rd (Note: 2nd place was Buckpasser)	10 1/2 (behind)	2:00 3/5	W. Boland	Damascus
10/21/1967	Hawthorne	Hawthorne Gold Cup	10 (fast)	1st	2 1/2	2:01 1/5	B. Baeza	(Whisper Jet)
11/7/1967	Aqueduct	Vosburgh Handicap	7 (fast)	1st	4 1/2	1:21 3/5	B. Baeza	(Jim J.)
1968 (4-year-old season)
5/4/1968	Aqueduct	Roseben Stakes	7 (fast)	1st	3	1:21 2/5	J. Rotz	(Tumiga)
5/18/1968	Hollywood Park	Californian Stakes	8 1/2 (fast)	1st	3	1:40 2/5	B. Baeza	(Gamely)
7/4/1968	Aqueduct	Suburban Handicap	10 (fast)	1st	2	1:59 3/5 (Note: Equaled the track record)	B. Baeza	(Bold Hour)
7/20/1968	Aqueduct	Brooklyn Handicap	10 (fast)	2nd	2 1/2 (behind)	1:59 1/5	B. Baeza	Damascus
8/3/1968	Saratoga	Whitney Stakes	9 (fast)	1st	8	1:48 4/5	B. Baeza	(Spoon Bait)
8/24/1968	Arlington Park	Washington Park Handicap	8 (fast)	1st	10	1:32 1/5 (Note: Set a new world record)	B. Baeza	(Racing Room)
9/11/1968	Atlantic City	United Nations Handicap	9 1/2 (firm) (Note: Turf race)	1st	neck	1:55 1/5	B. Baeza	(Advocator)
11/2/1968	Aqueduct	Vosburgh Handicap	7 (fast)	1st	6	1:20 1/5 (Note: Set a new track record)	B. Baeza	(Kissin' George)

== Assessment, honors and awards ==
In The Blood-Horse magazine's list of the top 100 U.S. thoroughbred champions of the 20th Century, Dr. Fager ranks sixth. In 1971, three years after he left the track, he was inducted into the National Museum of Racing and Hall of Fame in Saratoga Springs, New York.

Steve Haskin wrote a book on Dr. Fager for the Thoroughbred Legends series published by Eclipse Press in 2000. Dr. Fager's rivalry with Damascus was covered in Chapter 12 of Horse Racing's Greatest Rivalries, also published by Eclipse Press. Dr. Fager's career is recorded in "Champions: The Lives, Times, and Past Performances of the 20th Century's Greatest Thoroughbreds" by the editors and writers of the Daily Racing Form.

== Stud career ==
"The memory of him is the memory of the wind. I shall remember the brilliant Dr. Fager like a sudden shaft of sunlight on a darkening day."

— Sportswriter David Alexander

In August 1968, Dr. Fager was syndicated for 32 shares costing $100,000 each for a total value of $3.2 million. Most of the shares were retained by McKnight and Nerud, plus a few outside breeders including Paul Mellon. Dr. Fager retired to stud at Tartan Farm in 1969 near Ocala, Florida, where he stood for eight years before his death at age 12 on August 5, 1976. Death was attributed to a colon obstruction brought on by a bout of colic. He was buried at Tartan Farm, now known as Winding Oaks Farm.

Posthumously, he was the leading sire in North America of 1977 and finished second in 1978. From 265 named foals, he sired 172 winners (64.9%), 35 of whom were stakes winners. His most famous offspring include American Champion Two-Year-Old Filly Dearly Precious, 1978 co-champion sprinter Dr. Patches, Tree of Knowledge, Canadian champion L'Alezane and important broodmare Killaloe, the dam of Fappiano.

== Pedigree ==
Pedigree of Dr. Fager, bay horse, foaled April 6, 1964
Sire Rough'n Tumble 1948	Free For All; 1942	Questionnaire	Sting
Sire Rough'n Tumble 1948	Free For All; 1942	Questionnaire	Miss Puzzle
Sire Rough'n Tumble 1948	Free For All; 1942	Panay	Chicle
Sire Rough'n Tumble 1948	Free For All; 1942	Panay	Panasette
Sire Rough'n Tumble 1948	Roused; 1943	Bull Dog*	Teddy*
Sire Rough'n Tumble 1948	Roused; 1943	Bull Dog*	Plucky Liege*
Sire Rough'n Tumble 1948	Roused; 1943	Rude Awakening	Upset
Sire Rough'n Tumble 1948	Roused; 1943	Rude Awakening	Cushion
Dam Aspidistra 1954	Better Self; 1945	Bimelech	Black Toney
Dam Aspidistra 1954	Better Self; 1945	Bimelech	La Troienne*
Dam Aspidistra 1954	Better Self; 1945	Bee Mac	War Admiral
Dam Aspidistra 1954	Better Self; 1945	Bee Mac	Baba Kenny
Dam Aspidistra 1954	Tilly Rose; 1948	Bull Brier	Bull Dog*
Dam Aspidistra 1954	Tilly Rose; 1948	Bull Brier	Rose Eternal
Dam Aspidistra 1954	Tilly Rose; 1948	Tilly Kate	Draymont
Dam Aspidistra 1954	Tilly Rose; 1948	Tilly Kate	Teak (family: 1-r)

* Dr. Fager is inbred 3S x 4D to the stallion Bull Dog, meaning that he appears third generation on the sire side of his pedigree, and fourth generation on the dam side of his pedigree.

* Dr. Fager is inbred 4S x 5D x 5D to the stallion Teddy, meaning that he appears fourth generation once on the sire side of his pedigree, and fifth generation twice (via La Troienne and Bull Dog) on the dam side of his pedigree.

== See also ==
- List of racehorses
