= Empire City Handicap =

- Class: Discontinued stakes
- Location: Empire City Race Track, Yonkers, New York, United States (1920-1942); Jamaica Race Course, Jamaica, New York, United States (1942-1953)
- Inaugurated: 1920
- Race type: Thoroughbred - Flat racing

Race information
- Distance: 1 3/16 miles (9.5 furlongs)
- Surface: Dirt
- Track: left-handed
- Qualification: Three-year-olds
- Weight: Assigned
- Purse: $50,000 (1953)

The Empire City Handicap was an American Thoroughbred horse race inaugurated on October 22, 1900, as part of the opening day racecard at Empire City Race Track in Yonkers, New York. Sometimes referred in newspaper reports as the Empire City Stakes, it was raced at the Empire City track through 1942 then the following year it moved to the Jamaica Race Course in Jamaica, Queens where it remained until its final running on November 7, 1953.

The first edition of the Empire City Handicap was open to horses age three and older. From 1937 until its final running in 1953, the race was restricted to three-year-old horses. There was no race run 1901–1906, and 1911–1913. That inaugural running was won by Charentus in a World record time of 2:04 flat for a mile and a quarter on dirt.

During its tenure, the Empire City Handicap was contested at various distances:

- 1 mile : 1907
- 1 1/8 miles : 1908–1910, 1914–1922, 1934–1941
- 1 3/16 miles : 1942-1953
- 1 1/4 miles : 1900, 1923–1933

== Records ==
Speed record:

- 1:50.00 @ 11/8 M : Swing And Sway (1941)
- 1:56.00 @ 13/16 M : Apache (1942)
- 2:03.00 @ 11/4 M : Sting (1924)

Most wins:

- 2 - Peanuts (1926, 1927)

Most wins by a jockey:

- 2 - Laverne Fator (1922, 1925)
- 2 - Johnny Longden (1935, 1943)
- 2 - Nick Wall (1939, 1950)
- 2 - James Stout (1940, 1942)
- 2 - Eddie Arcaro (1944, 1949)
- 2 - Ted Atkinson (1945, 1952)
- 2 - Eric Guerin (1946, 1953)

Most wins by a trainer:

- 6 - James E. Fitzsimmons (1930, 1932, 1934, 1940, 1942, 1946)

Most wins by an owner:

- 5 - Belair Stud (1930, 1934, 1940, 1942, 1946)

== Winners ==
Year	Winner	Age	Jockey	Trainer	Owner	Dist. (Miles)	Time
1953	Find	3	Eric Guerin	William C. Winfrey	Alfred G. Vanderbilt Jr.	13/16 M	1:58.00
1952	Tom Fool	3	Ted Atkinson	John M. Gaver Sr.	Greentree Stable	13/16 M	1:58.00
1951	Counterpoint	3	Dave Gorman	Sylvester Veitch	C. V. Whitney	13/16 M	1:58.60
1950	All At Once	3	Nick Wall	W. M. Lyons	John W. Nizlek	13/16 M	1:59.00
1949	Palestinian	3	Eddie Arcaro	Hirsch Jacobs	Isadore Bieber	13/16 M	1:57.20
1948	Miss Request	3	Ovie Scurlock	James P. Conway	Florence Whitaker	13/16 M	1:57.40
1947	Phalanx	3	Ruperto Donoso	Sylvester Veitch	C. V. Whitney	13/16 M	1:57.80
1946	Bonnie Beryl	3	Eric Guerin	James E. Fitzsimmons	Belair Stud	13/16 M	1:56.80
1945	Gallorette	3	Ted Atkinson	Edward A. Christmas	William L. Brann	13/16 M	1:56.80
1944	Stir Up	3	Eddie Arcaro	John M. Gaver Sr.	Greentree Stable	13/16 M	1:56.20
1943	Chop Chop	3	Johnny Longden	Harris B. Brown	Josephine Douglas	13/16 M	1:57.20
1942	Apache	3	James Stout	James E. Fitzsimmons	Belair Stud	13/16 M	1:56.00
1941	Swing And Sway	3	Don Meade	John M. Gaver Sr.	Greentree Stable	11/8 M	1:50.00
1940	Fenelon	3	James Stout	James E. Fitzsimmons	Belair Stud	11/8 M	1:53.00
1939	Lovely Night	3	Nick Wall	Henry McDaniel	Florence Clark	11/8 M	1:52.00
1938	Stagehand	3	Jack Westrope	Earl Sande	Col. Maxwell Howard	11/8 M	1:51.00
1937	Rex Flag	3	Robert Merritt	John P. Jones	Louise Viau	11/8 M	1:52.40
1936	Esposa	4	Russell Kastner	Matthew P. Brady	William Ziegler Jr.	11/8 M	1:52.60
1935	Top Row	4	Johnny Longden	Albert A. Baroni	Albert A. Baroni	11/8 M	1:51.00
1934	Faireno	5	Silvio Coucci	James E. Fitzsimmons	Belair Stud	11/8 M	1:51.80
1933	Dark Secret	4	John Gilbert	George Tappen	Wheatley Stable	11/4 M	2:05.00
1932	Blenheim	4	Hank Mills	James E. Fitzsimmons	Wheatley Stable	11/4 M	2:06.60
1931	Questionnaire	4	Raymond Workman	Edward J. Bennett	James Butler	11/4 M	2:07.00
1930	Frisius	4	Whitey Abel	James E. Fitzsimmons	Belair Stud	11/4 M	2:06.00
1929	Sun Edwin	4	Linus McAtee	Louis Feustel	Arden Farm	11/4 M	2:05.75
1928	Recreation	4	Pete Goodwin	Robert A. Smith|	Jefferson Livingston	11/4 M	2:08.40
1927	Peanuts	5	Harold Thurber	George M. Odom	Robert L. Gerry Sr.	11/4 M	2:08.00
1926	Peanuts	4	Harry Richards	George M. Odom	Robert L. Gerry Sr.	11/4 M	2:06.00
1925	Mad Play	4	Laverne Fator	Sam Hildreth	Rancocas Stable	11/4 M	2:08.00
1924	Sting	3	Benjamin Breuning	Jimmy Johnson	James Butler	11/4 M	2:03.00
1923	Tryster	5	Earl Sande	Scott P. Harlan	Westmont Stable	11/4 M	2:05.40
1922	Grey Lag	4	Laverne Fator	Sam Hildreth	Rancocas Stable	11/8 M	1:54.00
1921	Yellow Hand	4	Charles H. Miller	A. J. Goldsborough	Charles A. Stoneham	11/8 M	1:51.00
1920	Naturalist	6	Clarence Turner	Thomas Welsh	Joseph E. Widener	11/8 M	1:53.00
1919	Lanius	8	Johnny Loftus	A. Jack Joyner	George D. Widener Jr.	11/8 M	1:51.80
1918	Roamer	7	Lawrence Lyke	A. J. Goldsborough	Andrew Miller	11/8 M	1:51.00
1917	Spur	4	Willie Knapp	John H. McCormack	James Butler	11/8 M	1:56.60
1916	Short Grass	8	Frank Keogh	John J. Flanigan	Emil Herz	11/8 M	1:51.20
1915	Gainer	4	Tommy McTaggart	James G. Rowe Sr.	Greentree Stable	11/8 M	1:51.60
1914	Buckhorn	5	Joe McCahey	Jack D. Adkins	Roderick J. Mackenzie	11/8 M	1:54.00
1913	Race not held						
1912	No races held due to the Hart–Agnew Law.						
1911	No races held due to the Hart–Agnew Law.						
1910	Dalmatian	3	George Archibald	Sam Hildreth	Sam Hildreth	11/8 M	1:51.00
1909	Maltbie	4	Stanley B. Page	James Gass	George Reif	11/8 M	1:53.80
1908	Pinkola	3	James Butler	William H. Fizer	William H. Fizer	11/8 M	1:54.80
1907	Prince Ahmed	3	Walter Ott	John C. Ferris Jr.	John C. Ferris Jr.	10/0 M	1:40.60
1900	Charentus	6	Willie Shaw	Jim McLaughlin	Orville L. Richards	11/4 M	2:04.00
