= Yonkers Handicap =

- Class: Discontinued horse race
- Location: Empire City Race Track (1900-1914, 1916-1944); Aqueduct Racetrack (1915); Jamaica Race Course (1945-1946)
- Inaugurated: 1900
- Race type: Thoroughbred - Flat racing

Race information
- Distance: 1 1/16 miles
- Surface: Dirt
- Track: Left-handed
- Qualification: Three-year-olds and up

The Yonkers Handicap was an American Thoroughbred horse race held between 1900 and 1946. Created by the Empire City Race Track in Yonkers, New York, it remained there through 1945 with the exception of 1915 when it was temporarily hosted by Aqueduct Racetrack in South Ozone Park, Queens, New York.

== The 1911-1912 statewide shutdown of horse racing ==
On June 11, 1908, the Republican controlled New York Legislature under Governor Charles Evans Hughes passed the Hart-Agnew anti-betting legislation. The owners of Empire City Race Track, and other racing facilities in New York State, struggled to stay in business without income from betting.

Racetrack operators had no choice but to drastically reduce the purse money being paid out which resulted in the purse for the Yonkers Handicap in 1909 cut by more than 40 percent. These small purses made horse racing unprofitable and impossible for even the most successful horse owners to continue in business. As such, for the 1910 racing season management of the New York racetracks dropped some of its minor stakes races and used the purse money to bolster its most important events. Even with additional funding, the 1915 Yonkers Handicap was little more than one-fifth of what it had been in 1908.

In spite of strong opposition by Empire City's owner James Butler as well as prominent owners such as August Belmont Jr. and Harry Payne Whitney, reform legislators were not happy when they learned that betting was still going on at racetracks between individuals and they had further restrictive legislation passed by the New York Legislature in 1910. Recorded as the Executive Liability Act, the legislation made it possible for racetrack owners and members of its board of directors to be fined and imprisoned if anyone was found betting, even privately, anywhere on their premises. After a 1911 amendment to the law to limit the liability of owners and directors was defeated, every racetrack in New York State shut down. As a result the Yonkers Handicap was not run in 1911 through 1913.

Owners, whose horses of racing age had nowhere to go, began sending them, their trainers and their jockeys to race in England and France. Many horses ended their racing careers overseas and a number remained there to become an important part of the European horse breeding industry. Thoroughbred Times reported that more than 1,500 American horses were sent overseas between 1908 and 1913 and of them at least 24 were either past, present, or future National Champions.

When a February 21, 1913 ruling by the New York Supreme Court, Appellate Division Court saw horse racing return in 1913 it was too late for the Empire City racing facility and the race would be run there for one final time on July 12, 1914. The financial difficulties brought on by the Hart-Agnew Law saw the Empire City track close and the race transferred to the Jamaica Race Course in Jamaica, New York where it was run in 1945 then cancelled after the 1946 edition.

== Records ==
Winners of the Yonkers Handicap broke the track record on four occasions and tied the existing record once.

Year	Winner	Distance	Time	Record type
1910	Dalmatian	11/16	1:45.20	NTR
1914	Borrow	11/16	1:44.60	NTR
1917	Spur	11/16	1:44.60	ETR
1940	Sickle T	11/16	1:43.80	NTR
1942	Apache	11/16	1:43.20	NTR

Most wins:

- 2 - Spur (1917, 1918)
- 2 - Sickle T. (1939, 1940)
- 2 - Apache (1942, 1943)

Most wins by a jockey:

- 3 - James Stout (1941, 1942, 1943)

Most wins by a trainer:

- 3 - James E. Fitzsimmons (1941, 1942, 1943)

Most wins by an owner:

- 6 - James Butler (1917, 1918, 1919, 1930, 1932, 1933)

== Winners ==
Year	Winner	Age	Jockey	Trainer	Owner	Dist. (Miles)	Time	Win$
1946	King Dorsett	4	Eric Guerin	John B. Theall	John B. Theall	1-1/16 m	1:43.60	$7,825
1945	Wait A Bit	6	Wayne D. Wright	Matthew P. Brady	William Ziegler Jr.	1-1/16 m	1:43.40	$7,825
1944	Alex Barth	4	Eric Guerin	James Hastie	Millbrook Stable (Louis H. Nimkoff)	1-1/16 m	1:43.40	$7,850
1943	Apache	4	James Stout	James E. Fitzsimmons	Belair Stud Stable	1-1/16 m	1:44.60	$8,350
1942	Apache	3	James Stout	James E. Fitzsimmons	Belair Stud Stable	1-1/16 m	1:43.20	$8,150
1941	Foxbrough	5	James Stout	James E. Fitzsimmons	Belair Stud Stable	1-1/16 m	1:44.20	$7,000
1940	Sickle T.	5	Wayne D. Wright	Jack Howard	Florence D. Whitaker	1-1/16 m	1:43.80	$7,425
1939	Sickle T.	4	Ronnie Nash	Jack Howard	Florence D. Whitaker	1-1/16 m	1:45.60	$7,375
1938	Busy K.	4	George Seabo	Leonard E. Ogle	D. A. Wood	1-1/16 m	1:48.20	$7,875
1937	Seabiscuit	4	Red Pollard	Tom Smith	Charles S. Howard	1-1/16 m	1:44.20	$8,225
1936	Clang	4	Eddie Litzenberger	William R. Sallee	John F. Clark Jr.	1-1/16 m	1:45.20	$5,525
1935	Top Row	4	Johnny Longden	Albert A. Baroni	Albert A. Baroni	1-1/16 m	1:46.00	$5,290
1934	Somebody	3	Robert Merritt	George E. Phillips	Maemere Farm Stable (DeWitt Page)	1-1/16 m	1:46.20	$2,320
1933	Star Fire	4	Tommy Luther	John Johnson	James Butler	1-1/16 m	1:46.00	$3,100
1932	Apprentice (DH); Pardee	3	Earl Sande; Hank Mills	Edward J. Bennett; Vincent P. Mara (assistant)	James Butler; Belair Stud Stable	1-1/16 m	1:47.00	
1931	Blind Bowboy	3	Laverne Fator	Herbert J. Thompson	Edward R. Bradley	1-1/16 m	1:47.40	$4,365
1930	Questionnaire	3	Raymond Workman	Edward J. Bennett	James Butler	1-1/16 m	1:47.20	$4,240
1929	Distraction	4	James H. Burke	James E. Fitzsimmons	Wheatley Stable	1-1/16 m	1:46.00	$5,170
1928	Dangerous	6	George Fields	Walter A. Carter	Rosedale Stable (George Clark)	1-1/16 m	1:47.00	$5,120
1927	Light Carbine	4	Fred J. Stevens	Michael J. Dunleavy	Ira B. Humphreys	1-1/16 m	1:48.40	$4,475
1926	Bou Chaib	5	Frank Catrone	John Hastings	Charles R. Fleischmann	1-1/16 m	1:51.40	$5,010
1925	Sun Pal	4	John Callahan	Selby Burch	Lee Rosenberg	1-1/16 m	1:46.20	$5,365
1924	Sunsini	4	John Callahan	Frank M. Bray	Lilane Stable (Mrs. William L. Walker)	1-1/16 m	1:45.40	$6,125
1923	Revenge	3	Linus McAtee	Mose Goldblatt	Harry Payne Whitney	1-1/16 m	1:46.00	$5,515
1922	Devastation	4	Benny Marinelli	Max Hirsch	Stephen Pettit	1-1/16 m	1:45.80	$4,720
1921	Royce Rools	6	Charles Fairbrother	William H. Travers	Fairmont Stable (Billy Gibson, et al)	1-1/16 m	1:46.40	$5,430
1920	On Watch	3	Newton Barrett	Max Hirsch	George W. Loft	1-1/16 m	1:47.00	$3,170
1919	Bally	5	Arthur Pickens	Richard O. Miller	James Butler	1-1/16 m	1:45.60	$2,325
1918	Spur	5	Andy Schuttinger	John H. McCormack	James Butler	1-1/16 m	1:45.20	$2,325
1917	Spur	4	Willie Knapp	John H. McCormack	James Butler	1-1/16 m	1:44.60	$2,325
1916	Roamer	4	James Butwell	A. J. Goldsborough	Andrew Miller	1-1/8 m	1:56.00	$1,905
1915	Hodge	4	Charles Borel	Kay Erik Spence	William J. Weber	1 m	1:38.20	align=center|$680
1914	Borrow	6	Joe Notter	James G. Rowe Sr.	Harry Payne Whitney	1-1/16 m	1:44.60	$1,925
1913	No races held due to the Hart–Agnew Law							
align=center 1911	No races held due to the Hart–Agnew Law							
1910	Dalmatian	3	Carroll Shilling	Sam Hildreth	Sam Hildreth	1-1/16 m	1:45.20	$1,925
1909	Arondack	3	Joe McCahey	James J. McLaughlin	Mrs. James J. McLaughlin	1-1/16 m	1:51.60	$1,925
1908	Frank Gill	4	A. Lang	John I. Smith	Jack L. McGinnis	1-1/16 m	1:47.00	$3,355
1907	Old Honesty	3	William Crimmins	Howard Oots	Andrew J. Gorey	1 m, 100 yd	1:43.80	$1,580
1906	1901	Race not held						
1900	James	3	Carl Mitchell	William M. Barrick	William M. Barrick	1-1/16 m	1:48.25	$1,000
