= King James (horse) =

American-bred Thoroughbred racehorse

- Sire: Plaudit
- Grandsire: Himyar
- Dam: Unsightly
- Damsire: Pursebearer
- Sex: Stallion
- Foaled: 1905
- Country: United States
- Colour: Bay
- Breeder: John E. Madden
- Owner: John E. Madden; Sam Hildreth (age 4-7)
- Trainer: John E. Madden; Sam Hildreth & David J. Leary
- Record: 57: 24-14-10
- Earnings: $104,155

Major wins
- Tremont Stakes (1907); Brooklyn Handicap (1909); Metropolitan Handicap (1909); Ocean Handicap (1909); Omnium Handicap (1909); Toronto Cup Handicap (1909, 1910); Annual Champion Stakes (1910); Brighton Mile (1910); Sheepshead Bay Handicap (1910)

Awards
- American Champion Older Male Horse (1909)

King James (foaled 1905 in Kentucky) was an American Thoroughbred racehorse. Bred by one of America's most important breeders, John E. Madden, he was the son of 1898 Kentucky Derby winner Plaudit. Although burdened by a bad stride that limited his racing ability, King James raced for five years, won a number of top events, and is acknowledged as the historical American Champion Older Male Horse of 1909.

Trained by John Madden, in 1907 King James faced stiff competition from future Hall of Fame inductee Colin. However, King James won the important Tremont Stakes and at age three was a top contender in New York racing. While his only significant win in 1908 came in the Annual Champion Stakes at the Sheepshead Bay Race Track, in other major events he ran second in the Travers Stakes, the Brooklyn Derby, and the Suburban Handicap plus earned thirds in the pre-Triple Crown Belmont Stakes, Withers Stakes, and Brooklyn Handicap.

In 1909, John Madden sold King James to Sam Hildreth, who began the year racing the four-year-old in California, where he won three important Handicap races. Returning to the New York racing circuit, King James won the Brooklyn Handicap and the Metropolitan Handicap and in Toronto, Ontario, Canada, the first of his two consecutive Toronto Cup Handicaps. Of his twelve starts that year, he had ten wins and two seconds, which earned him a historical Championship as the Top Handicap Male Horse in the United States.

At age five in 1910, King James won the Annual Champion Stakes, Sheepshead Bay Handicap, his second straight Toronto Cup Handicap, and the Brighton Mile run that year at Empire City Race Track. He continued to race through age seven with reasonable success, retiring with earnings in excess of $100,000. He was sent to stud duty at Henry T. Oxnard's Blue Ridge Farm in Virginia, where he sired ten stakes race winners. His offspring includes Travers and Withers Stakes winner Spur (b. 1909) and the filly My Dear (b. 1917), who raced successfully in Canada and the United States and was the 1921 American Champion Older Female Horse. King James was the damsire of Dark Secret and full sisters Mona Bell, the 2000 Canadian Horse Racing Hall of Fame inductee, and Iribelle, a foundation mare for E. P. Taylor's National Stud of Canada farm.

== Sire line tree ==
- King James
  - Spur
    - Sting
      - Questionnaire
        - Hash
        - Requested
        - Coincidence
        - Free For All
        - Double Brandy
  - My Own
  - King Nadi
