= 1878 Kentucky Derby =

Horse race

4th Kentucky Derby
- Kentucky Derby
- Grade I stakes race
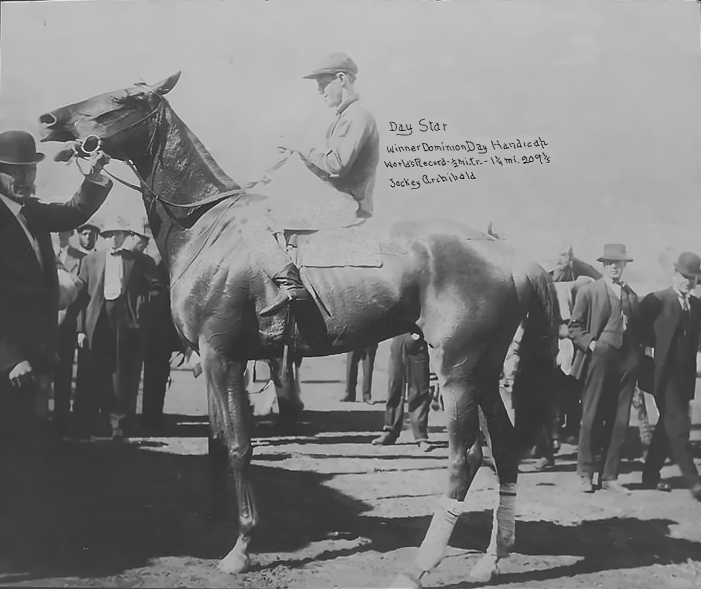
- Day Star, 1878 Kentucky Derby winner.
- Location: Churchill Downs
- Date: May 21, 1878
- Winning horse: Day Star
- Jockey: Jimmy Carter
- Trainer: Lee Paul
- Owner: Thomas J. Nichols
- Surface: Dirt

The 1878 Kentucky Derby was the 4th running of the Kentucky Derby. The race took place on May 21, 1878. Winning horse Day Star set a new Kentucky Derby record with a winning time of 2:37.25. He also led the pack from start to finish, a first for the Derby. However, the most notable horse was the heavily favored Himyar. He had a bad start at the gate and the rest of the pack was ten lengths ahead before he got started. However, he passed all of them except Day Star, who he trailed by only two lengths at the finish line. This was the year that pari-mutuel betting was introduced to the Derby from France.

== Full results ==
Finished	Post	Horse	Jockey	Trainer	Owner	Time / behind
1st		Day Star	Jimmy Carter	Lee Paul	Thomas J. Nichols	2:37.25
2nd		Himyar	P. Robinson		Barak G. Thomas	
3rd		Leveler	Robert Swim		R. H. Owens	
4th		Solicitor	B. Edwards		L. P. Tarlton	
5th		McHenry	W. James		Gen. Abe Buford	
6th		Respond	Ramey		Rodes & Carr	
7th		Burgundy	L. Jones		J. M. Wooding	
8th		Earl of Beaconsfield	Mahoney		A. Strauss & Co.	
9th		Charley Bush	J. Miller		Jennings & Hunt	

== Payout ==
Post	Horse	Win	Place	Show
	Day Star	$ 30.60		

- The winner received a purse of $4,050.
- Second place received $200.
