= Scarsdale Handicap =

- Class: Discontinued stakes
- Location: Empire City Race Track; Yonkers, New York, USA
- Inaugurated: 1918-1947
- Race type: Thoroughbred - Flat racing

Race information
- Distance: 1 mile, 70 yards (8.32 furlongs)
- Surface: Dirt
- Track: Left-handed
- Qualification: Three-year-olds and up

The Scarsdale Handicap was an American Thoroughbred horse race open to horses age three and older first run on October 16, 1918, over a mile and seventy yards on dirt at Empire City Race Track in Yonkers, New York.

== Historical notes ==
In its second year, the Scarsdale Handicap was run as the Westchester Handicap before reverting to its original name in 1920.

In 1942, Empire City Racetrack terminated flat racing and the facility reverted to hosting only harness racing events. After that, the Scarsdale Handicap was run at Jamaica Race Course in Jamaica, Queens, New York.

=== Race moments ===
The 1918 inaugural running was won by War Cloud, a three-year-old colt who had finished fourth in that year's Kentucky Derby, won the Preakness Stakes and ran second in the Belmont Stakes. Two months earlier future U.S. Racing Hall of Fame inductee Roamer had broken Salvator's record for the mile that had stood for twenty-eight years. As such, bettors sent War Cloud off as the 7-5 second choice behind 4-5 favorite Roamer.

The recently acquired Seabiscuit got his first stakes race win for new owner Charles Howard's on September 7, 1936, in the Governor's Handicap at the Detroit Fairgrounds Racetrack and then won the Hendrie Handicap at the same track on September 26. The colt continued to show his real talent under the care of trainer Tom Smith and jockey Red Pollard with his win in the Scarsdale Handicap on October 24, 1936.

Purchased for $100 by owner/trainer Tommy Heard, in 1942 Boysy became the first horse to win the Scarsdale twice. He came back the next year to capture the race for the third straight time, going wire-to-wire in winning by three lengths.

In the 1946 Scarsdale, Albert Snider, one of the most promising young riders of the time, rode Polynesian to victory. Snider would go on to become a first-string jockey with Calumet Farm and in 1948 was the regular jockey for the great Citation. He was scheduled to ride Citation in the U.S. Triple Crown series but disappeared on March 5, 1948, while fishing off the coast of Florida with two friends. Despite a lengthy and intensive search, their bodies were never recovered. Snider's death opened the door for Eddie Arcaro to ride Citation to win the Triple Crown.

The Scarsdale Handicap's twenty-eighth and final running in 1947 was won by With Pleasure who defeated a stellar field that included two future U.S. Racing Hall of Fame inductees and the previous year's American Champion Two-Year-Old Male Horse. It was Gallorette who finished second, with Double Jay in third, Donor fourth, and Stymie, the then richest racehorse in United States history who finished sixth.

=== Race distances ===
- 1 mile, 70 yards : 1918, 1925–1947
- 1 mile : 1919–1924

== Records ==
Speed record:

- 1 mile : 1:38 1/5 - Tryster (1922) (New track record)
- 1 mile, 70 yards : 1:41 3/5 - Seven Hearts (1944) at Jamaica
- 1 mile, 70 yards : 1:42 0/0 - Psychic Bid (1935) at Empire City

Most wins:

- 3 - Boysy (1941, 1942, 1943)

Most wins by a jockey:

- 3 - Jack Westrope (1938, 1931, 1947)

Most wins by a trainer:

- 3 - Tommy Heard (1941, 1942, 1943)

Most wins by an owner:

- 3 - Tommy Heard (1941, 1942, 1943)

== Winners ==
Year	Winner	Age	Jockey	Trainer	Owner	Dist. (Miles)	Time
1947	With Pleasure	4	Jack Westrope	Thomas P. Fleming	Brolite Farm (Oscar E. Breault)	1M, 70Yds	1:44.60
1946	Polynesian	4	Albert Snider	Morris H. Dixon	Gertrude T. Widener	1M, 70Yds	1:42.20
1945	Buzfuz	3	Tommy Luther	Joseph B. Rosen	Sunshine Stable (Dan Chappell/Moze Rauzin)	1M, 70Yds	1:41.80
1944	Seven Hearts	4	Paul Keiper	W. Graves Sparks	J. Graham Brown	1M, 70Yds	1:41.60
1943	Boysy	7	Steve Brooks	Tommy Heard	Tommy Heard	1M, 70Yds	1:43.00
1942	Boysy	6	Darrell Clingman	Tommy Heard	Tommy Heard	1M, 70Yds	1:44.60
1941	Boysy	5	Jack Westrope	Tommy Heard	Tommy Heard	1M, 70Yds	1:42.20
1940	Parasang	3	Leon Haas	James W. Healy	C. V. Whitney	1M, 70Yds	1:42.60
1939	War Dog	3	Johnny Longden	Jack McPherson	Falaise Stable	1M, 70Yds	1:44.80
1938	Clodion	4	Jack Westrope	Walter A. Carter	Walter A. Carter	1M, 70Yds	1:44.20
1937	Esposa	5	Nick Wall	Matthew P. Brady	William Ziegler Jr.	1M, 70Yds	1:45.00
1936	Seabiscuit	3	Red Pollard	Tom Smith	Charles S. Howard	1M, 70Yds	1:44.00
1935	Psychic Bid	3	Mike Corona	Robert A. Smith	Brookmeade Stable	1M, 70Yds	1:42.00
1934	King Saxon	3	Tommy Malley	Pat Knebelkamp	Pat Knebelkamp	1M, 70Yds	1:43.20
1932	1933	Race not held					
1931	Hibala	3	Willie Kelsay	Fred E. Kraft	Fred E. Kraft	1M, 70Yds	1:47.60
1930	Questionnaire	3	Charles Kurtsinger	Andy Schuttinger	James Butler	1M, 70Yds	1:45.20
1929	Polydor	3	Mack Garner	William J. Spiers	William Ziegler Jr.	1M, 70Yds	1:43.80
1928	Genie	3	Willie Kelsay	Henry McDaniel	Gifford A. Cochran	1M, 70Yds	1:44.60
1927	Black Panther	3	John Maiben	T. J. Healey	Walter J. Salmon Sr.	1M, 70Yds	1:45.60
1926	Cloudland	4	John Maiben	Frank E. Brown	Frank E. Brown	1M, 70Yds	1:46.60
1925	Blind Play	4	Clarence Kummer	Louis Feustel	Log Cabin Stable	1M, 70Yds	1:43.60
1924	Lucky Play	3	Clarence Kummer	Louis Feustel	August Belmont Jr.	1M	1:39.40
1923	Exodus	5	Frank Coltiletti	Scott P. Harlan	Greentree Stable	1M	1:38.80
1922	Tryster	4	Lawrence Lyke	Scott P. Harlan	Westmont Stable (Lawrence Waterbury II/J. Leonard Replogie)	1M	1:38.20
1921	Yellow Hand	4	C. H. Miller	A. J. Goldsborough	Charles A. Stoneham	1M	1:39.60
1920	Cirrus	4	Lavelle Ensor	Sam Hildreth	Sam Hildreth	1M	1:39.80
1919	Hannibal	3	James Butwell	T. J. Healey	Richard T. Wilson Jr.	1M	1:40.40
1918	War Cloud	3	Johnny Loftus	Walter B. Jennings	A. Kingsley Macomber	1M, 70Yds	1:43.00
