= Spur (horse) =

American-bred Thoroughbred racehorse

- Spur (c. 1916)
- Sire: King James
- Grandsire: Plaudit
- Dam: Auntie Mum
- Damsire: Melton
- Sex: Stallion
- Foaled: 1913
- Country: United States
- Colour: Bay
- Breeder: Henry T. Oxnard
- Owner: James Butler
- Trainer: John H. McCormack

Major wins
- Withers Stakes (1916); Travers Stakes (1916); Knickerbocker Handicap (1916); Jerome Handicap (1916); Southampton Handicap (1916); Empire City Handicap (1917); Long Beach Handicap (1918)

Spur (1913–1930) was an American thoroughbred racehorse.

== Racing career ==
In 1916, for his new trainer, John H. McCormack, he won eight major races and finished second in the Belmont Stakes. At age four, he equaled the Empire City track record for a mile and a sixteenth on the dirt in winning his second straight Yonkers Handicap.

== Stud record ==
As a sire, standing at James Butler's Eastview Farm in Tarrytown, New York, Spur's best progeny was Sting.

Spur died on May 31, 1930, at Eastview Farm.

== Sire line tree ==
- Spur
  - Sting
    - Questionnaire
      - Hash
      - Requested
      - Coincidence
      - Free For All
        - Rough'n Tumble
      - Double Brandy

== Pedigree ==
Pedigree of Spur
Sire King James	Plaudit	Himyar*	Alarm*
Sire King James	Plaudit	Himyar*	Hira*
Sire King James	Plaudit	Cinderella	Tomahawk
Sire King James	Plaudit	Cinderella	Manna
Sire King James	Unsightly	Pursebearer	Scottish Chief*
Sire King James	Unsightly	Pursebearer	Thrift
Sire King James	Unsightly	Hira Villa	Himyar*
Sire King James	Unsightly	Hira Villa	Tolima
Dam Auntie Mum	Melton	Master Kildare	Lord Ronald
Dam Auntie Mum	Melton	Master Kildare	Silk
Dam Auntie Mum	Melton	Violet Melrose	Scottish Chief*
Dam Auntie Mum	Melton	Violet Melrose	Violet
Dam Auntie Mum	Adderly	Ayrshire	Hampton
Dam Auntie Mum	Adderly	Ayrshire	Atalanta
Dam Auntie Mum	Adderly	Sandiway	Doncaster
Dam Auntie Mum	Adderly	Sandiway	Clemence

* Spur is inbred 3S x 4S to the stallion Himyar, meaning that he appears third generation and fourth generation on the sire side of his pedigree.

* Spur is inbred 4S x 4D to the stallion Scottish Chief, meaning that he appears fourth generation on the sire side of his pedigree, and fourth generation on the dam side of his pedigree.
