= Himyar (horse) =

19th and 20th-century American Thoroughbred racehorse and sire

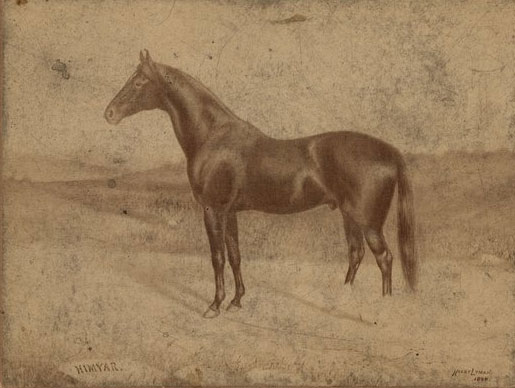
- Portrait of Himyar by Harry Lyman (1888)
- Sire: Alarm
- Grandsire: Eclipse
- Dam: Hira
- Damsire: Lexington
- Sex: Stallion
- Foaled: 1875
- Country: United States
- Colour: Bay
- Breeder: Major Barak G. Thomas
- Owner: 1) Dixiana Farm; 2) Edwin S. Gardner
- Record: 27 starts:14–6–4
- Earnings: $11,650

Major wins
- Colt Stakes (1877); Colt and Filly Fall Stakes (1877); Belle Meade Stakes (1877); Phoenix Hotel Stakes (1878); Belle Meade Stakes (1878); January Stakes (1878); Merchant's Stakes (1880); Turf Stakes (1880); American Classic Race placing: Kentucky Derby 2nd (1878)

Awards
- Leading sire in North America (1893)

Himyar (1875 – December 30, 1905) was an American Thoroughbred racehorse and sire. Although successful as a racehorse he is most notable as the sire of 1898 Kentucky Derby winner Plaudit and Domino, the grandsire of Colin and Peter Pan. Himyar lived to be thirty years old, outliving both Domino and his famous grandson Commando, who both died young.

== Early years and racing career ==
Himyar was a light bay colt sired by Alarm, who was a son of the British-bred stallion Eclipse (by Orlando). His dam Hira was sired by the 19th-century foundation sire, Lexington. Himyar was foaled in 1875 at Dixiana Farm, the Lexington stud farm of Major Barak Thomas, who also owned Himyar's sire Alarm.

Himyar had a nervous disposition and was difficult to train. He was described by sportswriter Charles Hatton as "light-boned, sickle-hocked [and] heavy-quartered."

Himyar showed promising form as a two-year-old, winning many high dollar stakes races while racing in "the West", which at the time referred to Kentucky and Tennessee. His main wins at age two included the Colt Stakes over 6 furlongs at Lexington, the Colt and Filly Stakes over 8 furlongs at Lexington and the Belle Meade Stakes at Louisville. He was retroactively considered the co-champion two-year-old colt of 1877.

At age three, Himyar won the Phoenix Hotel Stakes over 14 furlongs at Lexington, the Belle Meade Stakes over 12 furlongs in Nashville and the January Stakes, consisting of 1-mile heats. He was second in the 1878 Kentucky Derby, losing to Day Star by two lengths.

As an older horse, Himyar's main wins came in the Merchants' Stakes over 9 furlongs and the Turf Stakes, both in 1880. Himyar injured his leg in May 1881 and was retired from racing at six years old.

== Stud career ==
Himyar stood at stud for 16 years at Dixiana Farm but was sold in 1897 by Thomas, who was experiencing financial difficulties and was then bought by Edwin Sumner Gardner of Saundersville, Tennessee for $2,500. Himyar died at Gardner's Avondale Stud farm on December 30, 1905, of old age and was buried with the epitaph, "From his ashes speed springs eternal." Himyar's most notable offspring are the colts, Domino, who was nicknamed 'the black whirlwind' during his racing career, and Plaudit. He also sired the filly Correction in 1888, who won 38 major stakes races and was considered one of the fastest fillies of the time.

Himyar was the leading sire in North America of 1893. Through Plaudit, Himyar appears in the pedigrees of many Quarter Horses and his tail-male line is carried through the descendants of Holy Bull (through Plaudit) and Broad Brush (through Domino). The Himyar sire-line also produced the 1983 Epsom Derby winner Teenoso.

== Honors ==
The town of Himyar, Kentucky was named in honor of the racehorse.

== Sire line tree ==
- Himyar
  - Faraday
    - Oxford
      - Oracle
  - Domino
    - Disguise
      - Helmet
        - Bob Tail
      - Iron Mask
    - Doublet
    - Unmasked
    - Commando
      - Peter Pan
        - Black Toney
        - Pennant
        - Tryster
        - Laurano
        - Croyden
        - Macaw
        - Captain Kettle
        - Peter Hastings
      - Superman
        - Gladiator
        - Surf Rider
      - Celt
        - Dunboyne
        - Touch Me Not
      - Peter Quince
        - Papp
        - Peter King
      - Colin
        - Gentle Shepherd
        - On Watch
        - Jock
        - Neddie
      - Transvaal
        - Boniface
      - Ultimus
        - Luke McLuke
        - High Cloud
        - High Time
        - Infinite
        - Westwick
        - Stimulus
        - Supremus
    - Kimberley
    - Mardi Gras
    - Olympian
    - The Regent
  - Halton
  - Harry Reed
  - Plaudit
    - Siglight
    - King James
      - Spur
        - Sting
      - My Own
      - King Nadi
    - Edward
    - Harrigan
    - Plate Glass
    - Plaudmore
      - St Paul
      - Maternal Pride
    - Onager
    - Bringhurst
    - Virginia Yell
    - King Plaudit
      - Plaudit
        - Question Mark
        - Scooter W
  - Hyphen

== Pedigree ==
Pedigree of Himyar, bay horse, 1875
Sire Alarm 1869 bay	Eclipse; 1855 bay	Orlando (GB)	Touchstone (GB)
Sire Alarm 1869 bay	Eclipse; 1855 bay	Orlando (GB)	Vulture (GB)
Sire Alarm 1869 bay	Eclipse; 1855 bay	Gaze (GB)	Bay Middleton (GB)
Sire Alarm 1869 bay	Eclipse; 1855 bay	Gaze (GB)	Flycatcher (GB)
Sire Alarm 1869 bay	Maud; 1859 bay	Stockwell (GB)	The Baron (IRE)
Sire Alarm 1869 bay	Maud; 1859 bay	Stockwell (GB)	Pocahontas (GB)
Sire Alarm 1869 bay	Maud; 1859 bay	Countess of Abermarle (GB)	Lanercost (GB)
Sire Alarm 1869 bay	Maud; 1859 bay	Countess of Abermarle (GB)	Velocipede Mare (GB)
Dam Hira 1864 chestnut	Lexington; 1850 bay	Boston	Timoleon
Dam Hira 1864 chestnut	Lexington; 1850 bay	Boston	Florizel Mare
Dam Hira 1864 chestnut	Lexington; 1850 bay	Alice Carneal	Sarpedon (GB)
Dam Hira 1864 chestnut	Lexington; 1850 bay	Alice Carneal	Rowena
Dam Hira 1864 chestnut	Hegira; 1846 chestnut	Ambassador (GB)	Emilius (GB)
Dam Hira 1864 chestnut	Hegira; 1846 chestnut	Ambassador (GB)	Trapes (GB)
Dam Hira 1864 chestnut	Hegira; 1846 chestnut	Flight	Leviathan (GB)
Dam Hira 1864 chestnut	Hegira; 1846 chestnut	Flight	Charlotte Hamilton (family A15)
