= Rough'n Tumble =

American-bred Thoroughbred racehorse

- Sire: Free For All
- Grandsire: Questionnaire
- Dam: Roused
- Damsire: Bull Dog
- Sex: Stallion
- Foaled: 1948
- Country: United States
- Colour: Bay
- Owner: Frances A. Genter
- Trainer: Melvin Calvert
- Record: 16: 4-5-4
- Earnings: US$126,980

Major wins
- Primer Stakes (1950); Santa Anita Derby (1951)

Rough'n Tumble (foaled in 1948) was an American Thoroughbred racehorse who won the Santa Anita Derby and became what Bloodhorse called "one of the most successful stallions in Florida breeding history."

Rough'n Tumble was purchased privately for less than $5000 by Frances Genter, who entrusted his race conditioning to trainer Melvin Calvert.

As a two-year-old, Rough'n Tumble won the Primer Stakes at Arlington Park and at three, he captured the most important race for his age group in California: the Santa Anita Derby.

== Stud record ==
Among Rough'n Tumble's best progeny were Dr. Fager (b. 1964), a U.S. Racing Hall of Fame millionaire; My Dear Girl (b. 1957), the 1959 American Champion Two-Year-Old Filly; plus multiple stakes winners Conestoga, Flag Raiser, Ruffled Feathers, and Yes You Will.

== Sire line tree ==
- Rough'n Tumble
  - Yes You Will
  - Conestoga
  - Flag Raiser
  - Dr. Fager
    - Tree of Knowledge
    - Dr. Patches
  - Minnesota Mac
    - Great Above
      - Holy Bull
        - Dream Chief
        - Macho Uno
        - Bishop Court Hill
        - Eishin Boone
        - Woke Up Dreamin
        - Giacomo
        - Flashy Bull
        - Bwana Bull
        - In Orario
        - Sunny Ridge
    - Mac Diarmida

== Pedigree ==
Pedigree of Rough'n Tumble, bay stallion, 1948
Sire Free For All	Questionnaire	Sting	Spur
Sire Free For All	Questionnaire	Sting	Gnat
Sire Free For All	Questionnaire	Miss Puzzle	Disguise
Sire Free For All	Questionnaire	Miss Puzzle	Ruby Nethersole
Sire Free For All	Panay	Chicle	Spearmint*
Sire Free For All	Panay	Chicle	Lady Hamburg
Sire Free For All	Panay	Panasette	Whisk Broom*
Sire Free For All	Panay	Panasette	Panasine
Dam Roused	Bull Dog	Teddy	Ajax
Dam Roused	Bull Dog	Teddy	Rondeau
Dam Roused	Bull Dog	Plucky Liege	Spearmint*
Dam Roused	Bull Dog	Plucky Liege	Concertina
Dam Roused	Rude Awakening	Upset	Whisk Broom*
Dam Roused	Rude Awakening	Upset	Pankhurst
Dam Roused	Rude Awakening	Cushion	Nonpareil
Dam Roused	Rude Awakening	Cushion	Hassock (family: 1-o)

* Rough'n Tumble is inbred 4S x 4D to the stallion Spearmint, meaning that he appears fourth generation on the sire side of his pedigree, and fourth generation on the dam side of his pedigree.

* Rough'n Tumble is inbred 4S x 4D to the stallion Whiskbroom, meaning that he appears fourth generation on the sire side of his pedigree, and fourth generation on the dam side of his pedigree.
