= Himyar, Kentucky =

Unincorporated community in Kentucky, United States

- Unincorporated community
- Location within Kentucky Location within the United States
- Coordinates: 36°49′58″N 83°47′59″W
- Country: United States
- State: Kentucky
- County: Knox
- Elevation: 1,037 ft (316 m)
- Time zone: UTC-6 (Central (CST))
  - Summer (DST): UTC-5 (CST)
- GNIS feature ID: 508247

Himyar is an unincorporated community and coal town in Knox County, Kentucky, United States.

A post office was established in the community in 1906. The town's namesake is the racehorse Himyar, who placed second in the 1878 Kentucky Derby.
