= Plaudit =

American-bred Thoroughbred racehorse

- Sire: Himyar
- Grandsire: Alarm
- Dam: Cinderella
- Damsire: Blue Ruin or Tomahawk
- Sex: Stallion
- Foaled: 1895
- Country: United States
- Color: Bay
- Breeder: Dr. John D. Neet
- Owner: Dr. John D. Neet; John E. Madden (at age 3)
- Trainer: Edward D. Brown; Albert Simons (at age 3)
- Record: 20: 8-5-0
- Earnings: $32,065

Major wins
- Champagne Stakes (1897); Emerald Stakes (1897); Nursery Stakes (1897); Oakley Derby (1898); Clark Handicap (1898); Buckeye Stakes (1898) American Classics wins Kentucky Derby (1898)

Honors
- Plaudit Place in Lexington, Kentucky

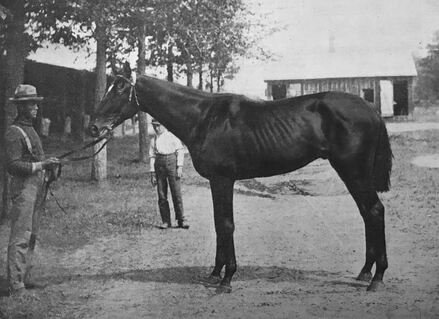
Plaudit in 1898

Plaudit (1895–1919) was an American Thoroughbred racehorse. A descendant of the English Triple Crown champion, West Australian, he was bred by Dr. John D. Neet, owner of Kindergarten Stud at Versailles, Kentucky. Plaudit is best known for winning the 1898 Kentucky Derby.

Conditioned by future U.S. Racing Hall of Fame trainer Edward D. Brown, racing at age two, Plaudit won four of his twelve starts. After finishing fourth in the Futurity Stakes at Sheepshead Bay Race Track, he was bought by noted Kentucky horseman, John E. Madden, and in a race for older horses in September, defeated the 1896 Kentucky Derby winner, Ben Brush. As a three-year-old, Plaudit was ridden by future U.S. Racing Hall of Fame jockey, Willie Simms, in the 24th edition of the Kentucky Derby. Plaudit came from behind with a powerful stretch drive to catch the betting favorite Lieber Karl and win by a nose.

In 1898, Plaudit won four of his eight races and finished second in the other four, notably in the Latonia Derby. His wins included a second defeat of Lieber Karl in the Clark Handicap. Retired at the end of the racing season, Plaudit stood at stud at John Madden's Hamburg Place in Lexington, Kentucky.

Plaudit was from Cinderella who was also the mare of Hastings, the 1896 Belmont Stakes winner and Leading sire in North America in 1902 and 1908. While Plaudit never matched Hastings' success as a sire, he produced a dozen graded stakes race winners, including multiple stakes champion, King James. However, his greatest contribution as a sire is his grandson, the American Quarter Horse Hall of Fame horse named after him, Plaudit.

Plaudit died in 1919 and is buried in the Hamburg Place equine cemetery.

== Sire line tree ==
- Plaudit
  - Siglight
  - King James
    - Spur
      - Sting
        - Questionnaire
    - My Own
    - King Nadi
  - Edward
  - Harrigan
  - Plate Glass
  - Plaudmore
    - St Paul
    - Maternal Pride
  - Onager
  - Bringhurst
  - Virginia Yell
  - King Plaudit
    - Plaudit
      - Question Mark
      - Scooter W

== Pedigree ==
Pedigree of Plaudit, bay stallion, 1895
Sire Himyar	Alarm	Eclipse	Orlando
Sire Himyar	Alarm	Eclipse	Gaze
Sire Himyar	Alarm	Maud	Stockwell*
Sire Himyar	Alarm	Maud	Countess of Albemarle
Sire Himyar	Hira	Lexington	Boston
Sire Himyar	Hira	Lexington	Alice Carneal
Sire Himyar	Hira	Hegira	Ambassador
Sire Himyar	Hira	Hegira	Flight
Dam Cinderella	Tomahawk	King Tom	Harkaway
Dam Cinderella	Tomahawk	King Tom	Pocahontas*
Dam Cinderella	Tomahawk	Mincemeat	Sweetmeat
Dam Cinderella	Tomahawk	Mincemeat	Hybla
Dam Cinderella	Manna	Brown Bread	Weatherbit
Dam Cinderella	Manna	Brown Bread	Brown Agnes
Dam Cinderella	Manna	Tartlet	Birdcatcher
Dam Cinderella	Manna	Tartlet	Don John Mare (family: 21-a)

* Plaudit is inbred 5S x 4D to the mare Pocahontas, meaning that she appears fifth generation (via Stockwell) on the sire side of his pedigree, and fourth generation on the dam side of his pedigree.
