= High Time (horse) =

American Thoroughbred racehorse

- Sire: Ultimus
- Grandsire: Commando
- Dam: Noonday
- Damsire: Domino
- Sex: Stallion
- Foaled: 1916
- Died: November 23, 1937
- Country: United States
- Colour: Chestnut
- Breeder: Wickliffe Stud
- Owner: Henry A. Porter
- Trainer: Harry A. Morrissey, Phil T. Chinn
- Record: 7: 1-0-1
- Earnings: $3,950

Major wins
- Hudson Stakes (1918)

Awards
- Leading sire in North America (1928); Leading broodmare sire in North America (1936, 1940)

High Time (1916–1937) was a chestnut Thoroughbred known for his brilliant spreed in a career cut short by unsoundness. He was the leading sire in North America of 1928 and the leading broodmare sire in both 1936 and 1940.

== Background ==
High Time was bred in Kentucky by Wickliffe Stud, a partnership between Price McKinney and Ed Corrigan. During his racing career, he was owned by Henry Porter. He was sired by Ultimus, who never raced due to unsoundness but became an influential sire. High Time's dam, Noonday, was a stakes winning daughter of Domino who also produced four other stakes winners (High Noon, Besom, Suffragette and Meeting House) and two notable broodmares, Meridian and Noontide. Her female line is still active, most notably producing Triple Crown winner Justify in 2018.

High Time had badly conformed forelegs, magnified by his being a "bleeder" – he bled through the nostrils during his races – which limited his stamina. His trainer Phil Chinn once commented that High Time was the only horse that he knew of who could enter the stretch leading by 15 lengths only to lose by 80.

== Race career ==
High Time made seven starts at age two at a time when this was considered a light campaign. His only victory came on June 24, 1918, in the Hudson Stakes at Aqueduct, when he "spreadeagled the field" to win in :58 2/5 for five furlongs, breaking the stakes record by two seconds and the track record by two-fifths. He also placed third in the Great American Stakes.

== Stud career ==
Little was expected of High Time at stud and he had very limited opportunities in his first few years. This changed when his first crop reached racing age and started to win. Chinn brought a part interest in the stallion and relocated him to his Himyar Stud in Kentucky. In 1926, Chinn paid $50,000 to buy-out the remaining half interest. Chinn was later forced to disperse his stock and High Time was sold in 1931 to Charles T. Fisher for $50,000, an unexpected bargain for a stallion valued at $100,000. High Time stood at Dixiana Farm for the remainder of his career.

High Time became known as a source of speed and was the leading sire in North America of 1928. He also ranked in the top 20 on 12 other occasions. His get included Hall of Famer and two-time American Horse of the Year Sarazen and 1928 Champion Two Year Old Colt High Strung. Over half of his 289 progeny won at the age of two.

High Time was also the leading broodmare sire in 1936 and 1940. His daughters produced multiple winners such as True North, Top Row and Eight Thirty.

High Time died of natural causes on November 23, 1937, at the age of 21. He is buried in an unmarked grave on the grounds of Dixiana Farm in Lexington, Kentucky.

== Sire line tree ==
- High Time
  - Sarazen
  - High Strung
    - Star Fiddle
  - Zacaweista
    - Buzfuz

== Pedigree ==
Pedigree of High Time, chestnut, 1916
Sire Ultimus	Commando	Domino*	Himyar*
Sire Ultimus	Commando	Domino*	Mannie Gray*
Sire Ultimus	Commando	Emma C	Darebin
Sire Ultimus	Commando	Emma C	Guenn
Sire Ultimus	Running Stream	Domino*	Himyar*
Sire Ultimus	Running Stream	Domino*	Mannie Gray*
Sire Ultimus	Running Stream	*Dancing Water	Isonomy (GB)
Sire Ultimus	Running Stream	*Dancing Water	Pretty Dance (GB)
Dam Noonday	Domino*	Himyar*	Alarm*
Dam Noonday	Domino*	Himyar*	Hira*
Dam Noonday	Domino*	Mannie Gray*	Enquirer*
Dam Noonday	Domino*	Mannie Gray*	Lizzie G*
Dam Noonday	*Sundown	Springfield (GB)	St Albans (GB)
Dam Noonday	*Sundown	Springfield (GB)	Viridis (GB)
Dam Noonday	*Sundown	Sunshine (GB)	Thormanby (GB)
Dam Noonday	*Sundown	Sunshine (GB)	Sunbeam (GB) (family 1-h)

* High Time is inbred 3S x 3S x 2D to the stallion Domino, meaning that he appears third generation twice on the sire side of his pedigree, and second generation once on the dam side of his pedigree.

Such a high degree of inbreeding is unusual and may have contributed to his unsoundness.
