= Marie Joseph Butler =

Marie Joseph Johanna Butler

Personal life
- Born: 22 July 1860 Ballynunry, County Kilkenny
- Died: 23 April 1940 (aged 79) Tarrytown, New York

Religious life
- Religion: Roman Catholic
- Order: Religious of the Sacred Heart of Mary

Mother Marie Joseph "Johanna" Butler (22 July 1860 – 23 April 1940) was an Irish nun, mother general of the Religious of the Sacred Heart of Mary, and founder of Marymount colleges and schools.

== Biography ==
Johanna Butler was born in Ballynunry, County Kilkenny on 22 July 1860. She was the seventh child of John Butler, gentleman farmer, and Ellen (née Forrestal). She attended the Sisters of Mercy school in New Ross, County Wexford, entering the Congregation of the Sacred Heart of Mary in Béziers, France in 1876. She took the name Marie Joseph when she was sent to Porto, Portugal in 1879, professing in 1880. From 1880 to 1903 she taught in Porto and Braga, becoming superior of the school in 1893.

In 1903 she was appointed head of the congregation's school at Sag Harbor, Long Island, New York, with the responsibility to extend the influence of the order in there. Her cousin, James Butler, gave her a site in Tarrytown, New York in 1907 where she founded the first Marymount school that year, and then the first Marymount college in 1918. She acted as president of the college, with the institution being granted a charter from the University of the State of New York to award bachelor's degrees in 1924. Butler was elected mother general of her order in 1926 serving until her death, being the first American superior elected to the international congregation of the catholic church. She introduced a unique educational system incorporating high religious and academic standards with the aim of preparing young women for a changing society. She became a citizen of the United States in 1927.

Under her influence, the order founded 14 schools, including a novitiate in New York, three Marymount schools and three colleges, and 23 foundations internationally with Marymount schools in Rome, Paris, and Quebec, and a novitiate in Ferrybank, Waterford, Ireland. Butler died on 23 April 1940 in Tarrytown and was buried there. In 1954 her spiritual writing were published as As an eagle: the spiritual writings of Mother Butler R.S.H.M. by J.K. Leahy. She was put forward as a candidate for canonisation in 1948.
