= Mac Diarmida =

American Thoroughbred racehorse

- Sire: Minnesota Mac
- Grandsire: Rough'n Tumble
- Dam: Flying Tammie
- Damsire: Tim Tam
- Sex: Stallion
- Foaled: 1975
- Country: United States
- Colour: Dark Bay/Brown
- Breeder: John Hartigan
- Owner: Dr. Jerome M. Torsney
- Trainer: Flint S. Schulhofer
- Record: 16: 12-0-2
- Earnings: US$503,184

Major wins
- Lexington Handicap (1978); Leonard Richards Stakes (1978); Lawrence Realization Stakes (1978); Long Branch Stakes (1978); Secretariat Stakes (1978); Canadian International Championship (1978); Washington, D.C. International Stakes (1978)

Awards
- American Champion Male Turf Horse (1978)

Honours
- Mac Diarmida Handicap at Gulfstream Park

Mac Diarmida (1975–2005) was an American Thoroughbred Champion racehorse.

== Background ==
Mac Diarmida was bred by John Hartigan at his Cashel Stud farm in Ocala, Florida. Sired by Minnesota Mac, he was out of the mare Flying Tammie, a daughter of the 1958 Kentucky Derby and Preakness Stakes winner, Tim Tam.

As a weanling, John Hartigan sold Mac Diarmida in a private transaction to Dr. Jerome Torsney, who entrusted his race conditioning to future U.S. Racing Hall of Fame inductee Scotty Schulhofer.

== Racing career ==
Mac Diarmida made two starts at age two without a win. However, at age three he had a Championship year, winning twelve of his fourteen starts including ten in a row on grass surfaces. Ridden by Jean Cruguet, among Mac Diarmida's 1978 wins, he beat older horses in capturing the two most important North American turf races with European competitors: the Canadian International Championship at Woodbine Racetrack in Toronto, Ontario, Canada and the Washington, D.C. International at Laurel Park Racecourse in Laurel, Maryland. Mac Diarmida was voted the 1978 Eclipse Award for American Champion Male Turf Horse.

Wintered in Florida, Mac Diarmida was being readied to race as a four-year-old when he injured himself and had to be retired from racing.

== Stud career ==
He was sent to stand at stud at Cashel Stud in Ocala, Florida where he had been born. There, he served as a stallion for thirteen seasons before being pensioned. He was the sire of seventy-three winners, including four stakes winners.

Due to the infirmities of old age, on September 8, 2005, the thirty-year-old Mac Diarmida was humanely euthanized. He is buried in the Cashel Farm's equine cemetery.
