= 1898 Kentucky Derby =

Horse race

24th Kentucky Derby
- Kentucky Derby
- Grade I stakes race
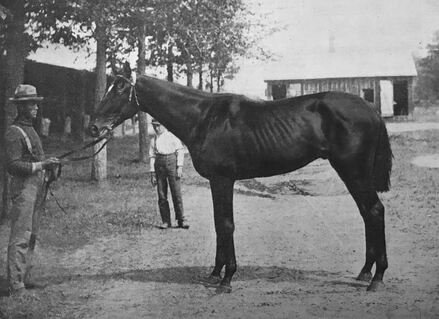
- Plaudit, winner of the 1898 Kentucky Derby
- Location: Churchill Downs
- Date: May 4, 1898
- Winning horse: Plaudit
- Jockey: Willie Simms
- Trainer: John E. Madden
- Owner: John E. Madden
- Surface: Dirt

The 1898 Kentucky Derby was the 24th running of the Kentucky Derby. The race took place on May 4, 1898.

== Full results ==
Finished	Post	Horse	Jockey	Trainer	Owner	Time / behind
1st		Plaudit	Willie Simms	John E. Madden	John E. Madden	2:09.00
2nd		Lieber Karl	Tommy Burns	George Walker	John W. Schorr	Nose
3rd		Isabey	A. Knapp		Stanton & Tucker	20
4th		Han d'Or	Jess Conley		George A. Singerly	

- Winning breeder: Dr. John D. Neet (KY)

== Payout ==
- The winner received a purse of $4,850.
- Second place received $700.
- Third place received $300.
