= Top Row =

Thoroughbred racehorse

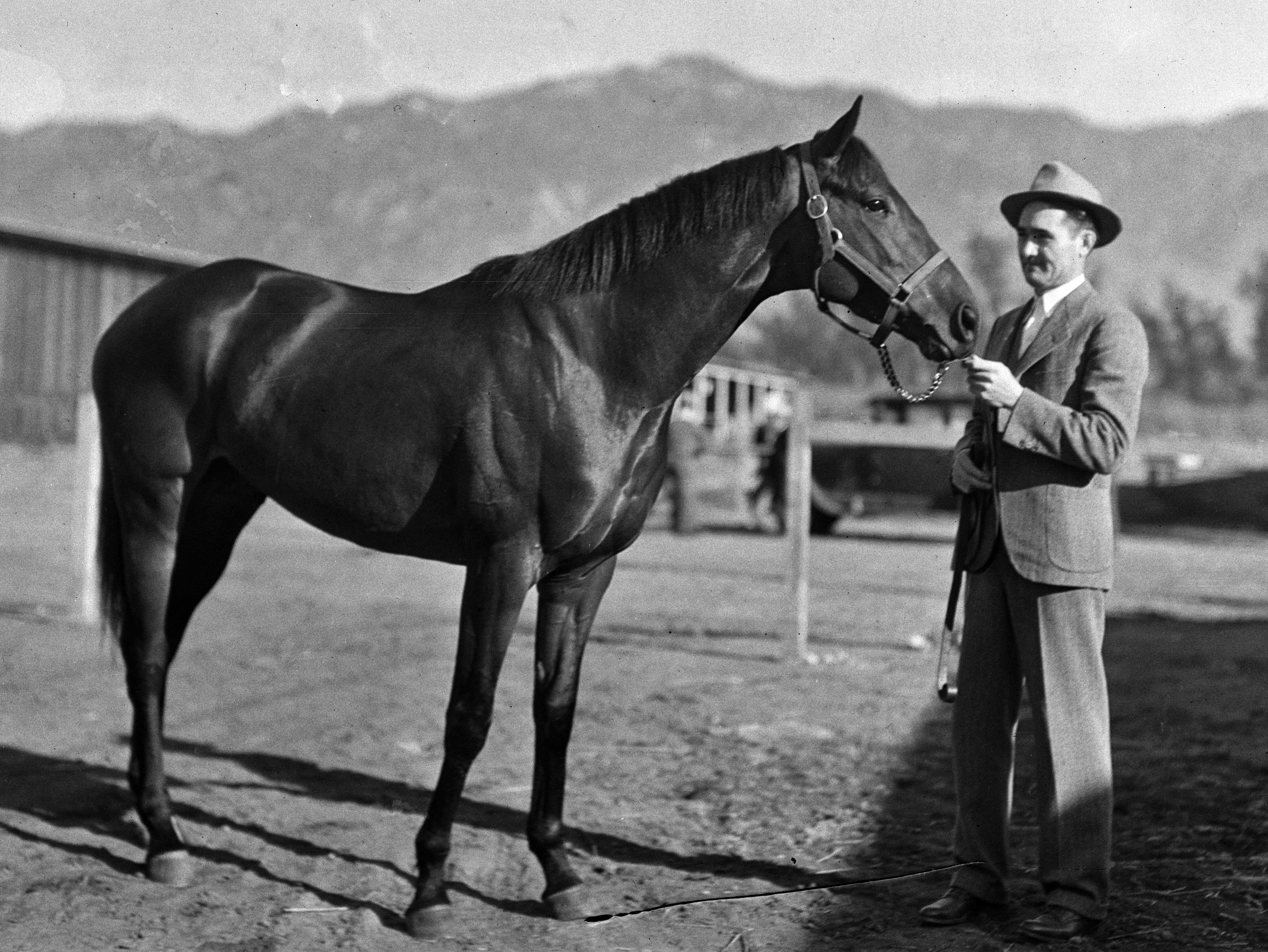
- Top Row with Albert Baroni
- Sire: Peanuts
- Grandsire: Ambassador
- Dam: Too High
- Damsire: High Time
- Sex: Stallion
- Foaled: 1931
- Country: United States
- Color: Bay
- Breeder: Elsie Cassatt Stewart
- Owner: Albert A. Baroni
- Trainer: Albert A. Baroni
- Record: 42: 14-8-9
- Earnings: US$213,870

Major wins
- San Francisco Handicap (1934); Massachusetts Handicap (1935); Narragansett Special (1935); Waggoner Memorial Handicap (1935); Empire City Handicap (1935); Great Western Handicap (1935); Santa Anita Christmas Stakes (1935; Spring Handicap (1935); St. Patrick's Day Handicap (1935); Yonkers Handicap (1935); Santa Anita Handicap (1936)

Top Row (foaled in 1931) was an American Thoroughbred racehorse who, during three years of racing, set two track records, one of which was a world record, and won the then world's richest horse race.

Bred by Mrs. Elsie Cassatt Stewart, daughter of businessman and Thoroughbred racehorse owner, Alexander Cassatt, Top Row was claimed by trainer Bert Baroni for $3,500. At age three in 1934 the colt set a new world record of 1:42 for a mile and a sixteenth on dirt in winning the San Francisco Handicap at Bay Meadows Racetrack in San Mateo, California, beat the great and future Hall of Fame inductee Discovery to win the prestigious Narragansett Special in 1935, won the 1935 Christmas Stakes at Santa Anita Park in a track record time of 1:35 4/5 for a mile on dirt, and in 1936 won the Santa Anita Handicap, the then world's richest horse race. Top Row's earnings for 1936 played the major role in making his damsire High Time the Leading broodmare sire in North America.

Top Row was retired to stud duty in California where he met with modest success as a sire.
