= Sting (horse) =

American-bred Thoroughbred racehorse

- Sire: Spur
- Grandsire: King James
- Dam: Gnat
- Damsire: Voter
- Sex: Stallion
- Foaled: 1921
- Country: United States
- Colour: Bay
- Breeder: James Butler
- Owner: James Butler
- Trainer: Jimmy Johnson
- Record: 18: 9-1-2
- Earnings: US$44,713

Major wins
- Eclipse Stakes (1923); Wakefield Handicap (1923); Empire City Handicap (1924); Metropolitan Handicap (1925); Suburban Handicap (1925); Montana Handicap (1925); Excelsior Handicap (1925); Salvator Handicap (1925)

Sting (foaled 1921) was an American Thoroughbred racehorse.

== Racing career ==
Sting was bred and owned by James Butler (who also owned and raced his sire, Spur).

== Racing career ==
As a two-year-old, Sting won the Eclipse Stakes and Wakefield Handicap and finished third in the Ardsley Handicap and the Hartsdale Stakes. At three he won the July 8, 1924 Empire City Handicap, setting a track record of 2:03 for a mile and a quarter on the dirt at Empire City Race Track. As a four-year-old, he won the Metropolitan and Suburban Handicaps (then the most prestigious race on the East Coast of the United States for older horses). That year, Sting also set a new track record of 1:42 3/5 for a mile and a sixteenth in winning the Excelsior Handicap at Jamaica Race Course and a new world record of 1:41 1/5 for a mile and seventy yards on dirt in winning the Montana Handicap. He also won the Excelsior and Salvator Handicaps, and placed second in the Brooklyn Handicap. In 18 lifetime starts Sting won nine, finished second once and third two times, earning a total of $44,713.

== Stud record ==
When his racing career ended, Sting stood at stud for his owner. Among his offspring, Questionnaire was his most successful runner.

== Sire line tree ==
- Sting
  - Questionnaire
    - Hash
    - Requested
    - Coincidence
    - Free For All
      - Rough'n Tumble
        - Yes You Will
        - Conestoga
        - Flag Raiser
        - Dr. Fager
        - Minnesota Mac
        - Ruffled Feathers
    - Double Brandy
