= Day Star =

American-bred Thoroughbred racehorse

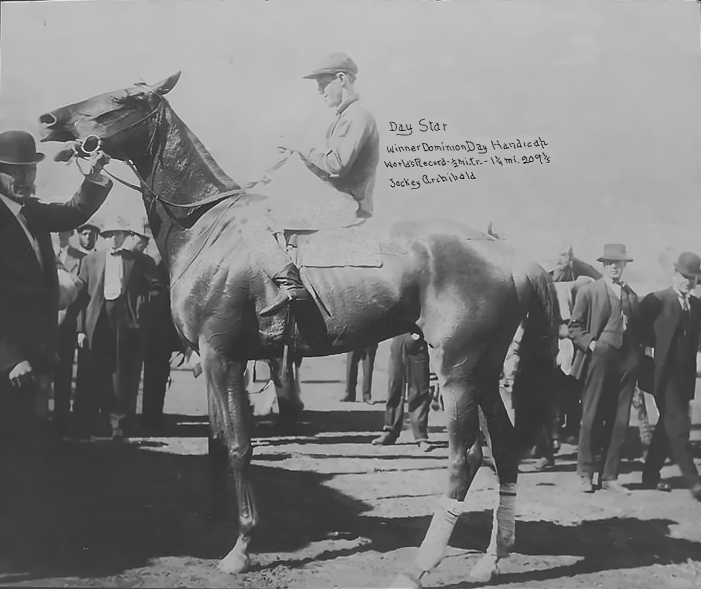
- Sire: Star Davis
- Grandsire: Glencoe
- Dam: Squeeze-'em
- Damsire: Lexington
- Sex: Stallion
- Foaled: 1875
- Country: United States
- Colour: Chestnut
- Breeder: J. M. Clay
- Owner: Thomas J. Nichols
- Trainer: Lee Paul
- Record: 42: 11-7-5
- Earnings: $4,050

Major wins
- Blue Ribbon Stakes (1878); Kentucky Derby (1878)

Day Star (1875–1893) was the winner of the 4th annual Kentucky Derby held at Churchill Downs on May 21, 1878. He was a chestnut colt that was foaled in Kentucky and was sired by Star Davis (by the successful Glencoe). His dam was Squeeze-'em who was sired by Lexington, a foundation sire of many modern Thoroughbred lineages.

Day Star won the Derby by two lengths in an official time of 2:37.25, beating the race record set by Aristides in 1875, and winning a total of $4,050.

In his career, Day Star had 42 starts, 11 wins, 7 places and 5 shows.

A 1910 Daily Racing Form article states that Day Star was sold after his racing career and stood at stud on a western farm, dying at the age of 18 years in 1893.

== Pedigree ==
Pedigree of Day Star
| Sire Star Davis 1849 | Glencoe I 1831 | Sultan | Selim |
| Sire Star Davis 1849 | Glencoe I 1831 | Sultan | Bacchante |
| Sire Star Davis 1849 | Glencoe I 1831 | Trampoline | Tramp |
| Sire Star Davis 1849 | Glencoe I 1831 | Trampoline | Web |
| Sire Star Davis 1849 | Margaret Wood 1840 | Priam | Emilius |
| Sire Star Davis 1849 | Margaret Wood 1840 | Priam | Cressida |
| Sire Star Davis 1849 | Margaret Wood 1840 | Maria West | Marion |
| Sire Star Davis 1849 | Margaret Wood 1840 | Maria West | Ella Crump |
| Dam Squeeze-'em 1869 | Lexington 1850 | Boston | Timoleon |
| Dam Squeeze-'em 1869 | Lexington 1850 | Boston | Florizel Mare |
| Dam Squeeze-'em 1869 | Lexington 1850 | Alice Carneal | Sarpedon |
| Dam Squeeze-'em 1869 | Lexington 1850 | Alice Carneal | Rowena |
| Dam Squeeze-'em 1869 | Skedaddle 1860 | Yorkshire | St. Nicholas |
| Dam Squeeze-'em 1869 | Skedaddle 1860 | Yorkshire | Miss Rose |
| Dam Squeeze-'em 1869 | Skedaddle 1860 | Magnolia | Glencoe I |
| Dam Squeeze-'em 1869 | Skedaddle 1860 | Magnolia | Myrtle |
