= James Butler (grocer) =

American businessman

- Born: 1855; County Kilkenny, Ireland
- Died: February 20, 1934 (aged 79); New York, United States
- Resting place: Butler Memorial Chapel, Marymount Convent, Tarrytown, New York
- Occupations: Businessman: Grocery store founder Race horse and race track owner
- Spouse: Mary Ann Rourke Butler (m. 1883; died 1906)
- Children: Beatrice Katherine, James Jr., Genevieve, Pierce, William
- Awards: Knight Commander of the Order of St. Gregory the Great

James Butler (1855 – February 20, 1934) was an American businessman from New York and prominent owner of racehorses and racetracks. With his cousin, Mother Marie Joseph Butler, he founded Marymount College in Tarrytown, New York in memory of his late wife.

== Life ==
=== Early years ===
Butler was born in 1855 in County Kilkenny, Ireland, on farming property held by his family for hundreds of years. After education in a Russellam village parish school, he emigrated to Boston, with his parents, when he was 20 years old, and began farming, in Goshen Mountain, Massachusetts. He returned to New York in under two years, joining a brother who had emigrated before him, Butler then started working for hotels in Chicago and New York City, at which he learned food service operations.

=== Grocery business ===
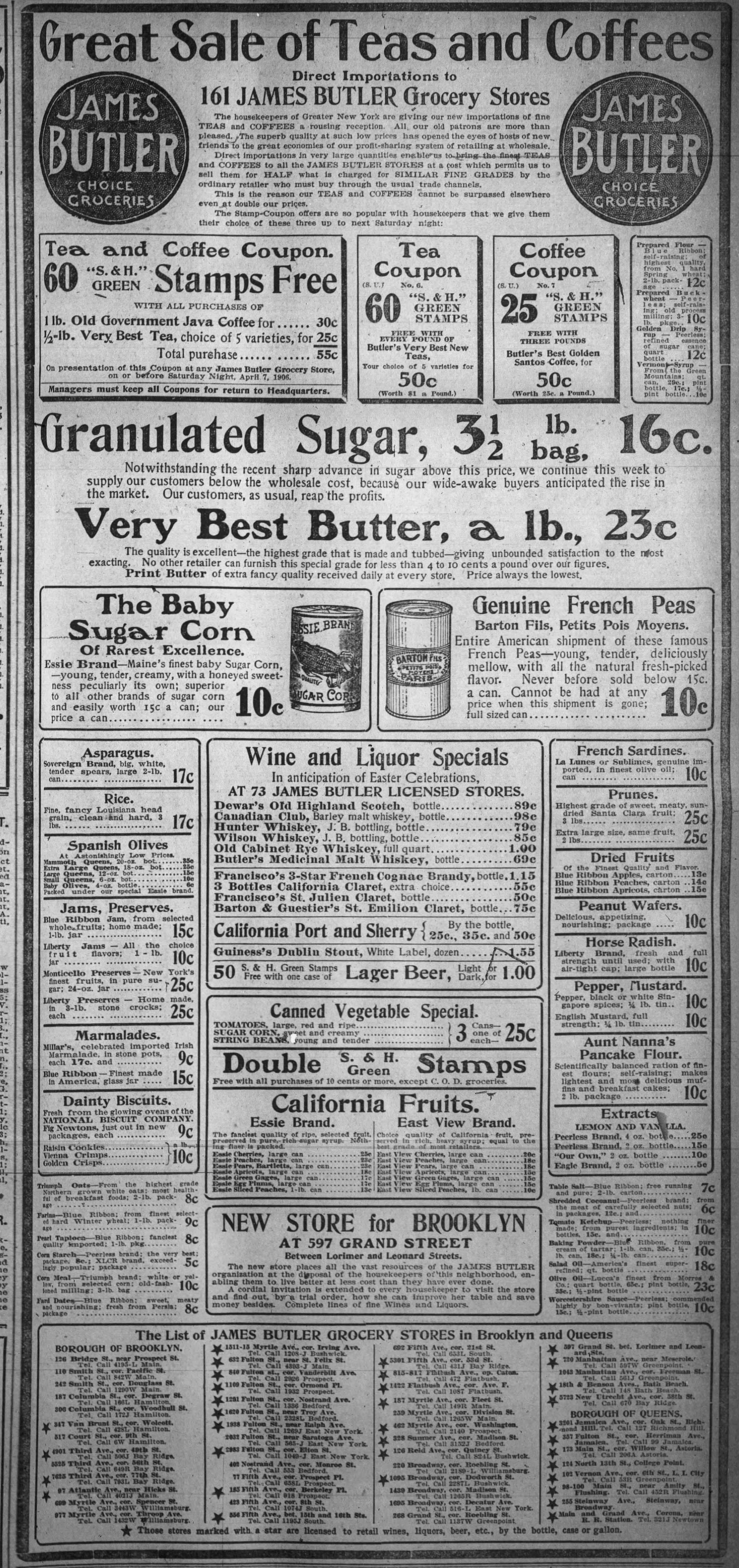
1906 advertisement for Butler's stores

As a hotel steward in the early 1880s, Butler invested his $2,000 life savings with Patrick J. O'Connor (the son of his landlady) to open a grocery store on Second Avenue in New York. The business grew to a chain of stores so successful that Butler quit the hotel business and bought out O'Connor. By 1914, Butler owned 43 stores (all featuring green and gold exteriors). His locations on Columbus and Amsterdam Avenues were meant to serve the "carriage trade" on Central Park West and west of Broadway. He had a reputed net worth of $30 million by 1929.

=== Horse racing ===
The stores made home deliveries, and when the horses grew old, they were retired to his estate in Westchester. By 1890, Butler had bought his first horses, and in 1893 acquired the EastView Stock Farm near Greenburgh and Mount Pleasant, New York. In early 1907, he purchased the closed Empire City Race Track, a "trotting" track, and reopened it for thoroughbred racing. In 1912, after a wave of concern over gambling went through the eastern U.S., Butler financed a horse racing track in Ciudad Juárez, Mexico, for which prominent horse racing personality Matt Winn headed operations. In 1914, Butler purchased Laurel Park race track in Maryland and made Winn its general manager.

=== End ===
Butler died on February 20, 1934, at his home. He was survived by four of his children. At the time of his death, Butler's grocery store chain was the sixth largest in the U.S. by total sales, and his more than 1,100 stores were second in number only to A&P in the New York area. Three thousand mourners attended his funeral at St. Patrick's Cathedral. His son, James Butler Jr., became the president of the company in 1935.

== Philanthropy ==
Butler retired the $2500 outstanding debt of the parish of the Church of the Magdalene in Pocantico Hills. The Butler family also donated a number of the church's stained glass windows in the Magdalene.

In 1907, he donated to the French congregation of the Religious of the Sacred Heart of Mary (RSHM) the land, and funded the establishment of Marymount School in Tarrytown, in memory of his wife, Mary A. Rorke Butler, who had died the year before. The superior of the congregation in America was his cousin, Mother Marie Joseph (Johanna) Butler, from County Kilkenny, Ireland.

Before his death in 1934, Butler funded the purchase of the Otto H. Kahn House in Manhattan for the Convent of the Sacred Heart and its school.

He was named a Knight of the Order of St. Gregory the Great.

The J. Butler Saloon that opened on the first floor of the Yonkers Raceway grandstand in the early 1980s is named after him.

== See also ==
- Butler Handicap
- Comely
- Questionnaire (horse)
- Spur (horse)
- Sting (horse)
