= Yonkers Raceway & Empire City Casino =

Racino in Yonkers, New York, United States

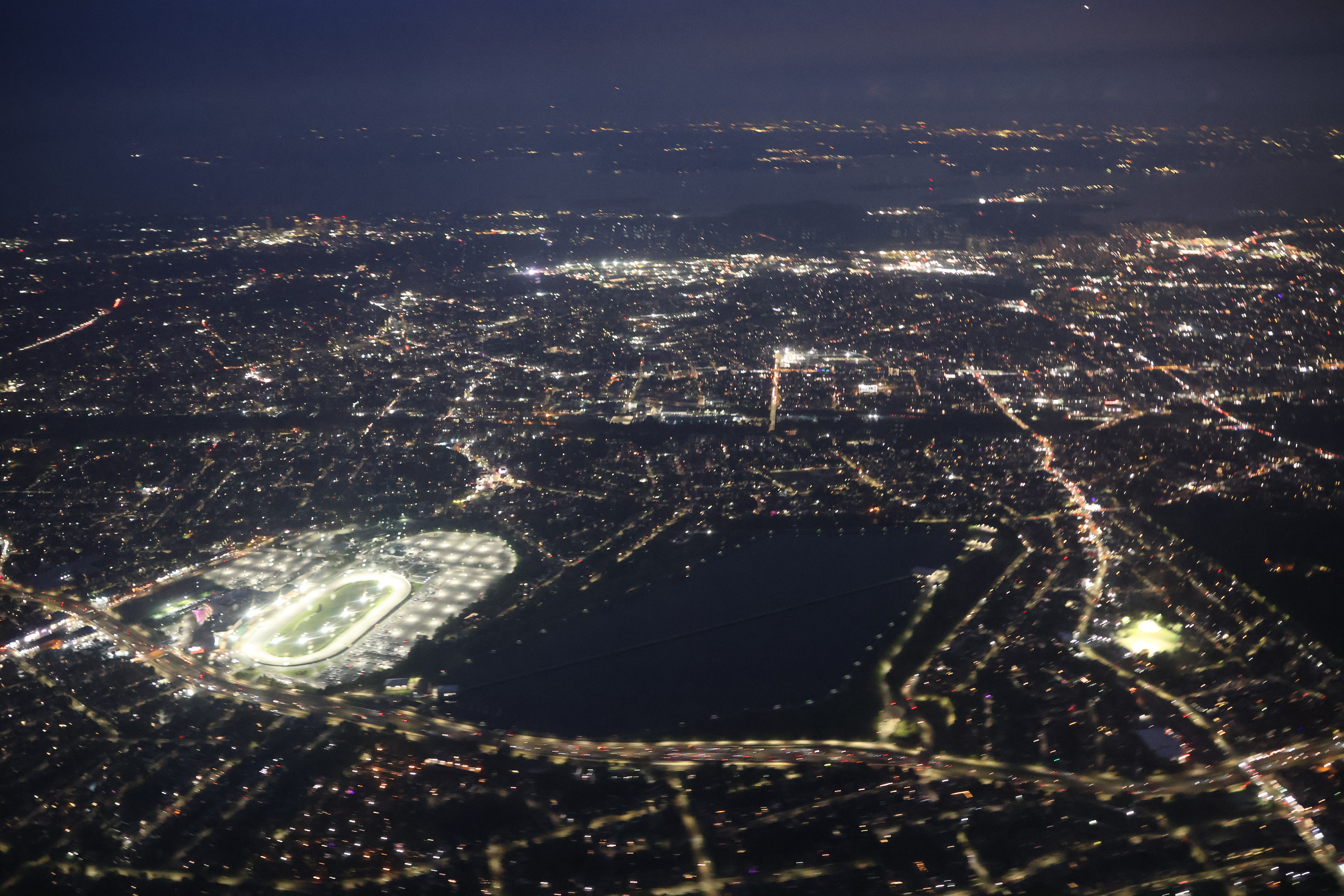
- Yonkers Raceway (left) and Hillview Reservoir at night in 2023
- Interactive map of Yonkers Raceway & Empire City Casino
- Location: Yonkers, New York, United States
- Coordinates: 40°55′05″N 73°51′55″W
- Owned by: Vici Properties
- Operated by: MGM Resorts International
- Date opened: 1899; 127 years ago
- Race type: Standardbred Harness Racing
- Course type: Dirt
- Notable races: George Morton Levy Memorial Pacing Series; Blue Chip Matchmaker; Art Rooney Pace; Lawrence B. Sheppard Pace; Lismore Pace; Yonkers Trot; Hudson Filly Trot; Messenger Stakes; Lady Maud Pace; New York Night of Champions

Yonkers Raceway & Empire City Casino is a one-half-mile standardbred harness racing dirt track and slots racino in Yonkers, New York, United States. Founded in 1899 as the Empire City Race Track, the complex is located at the intersection of Central Park Avenue and Yonkers Avenue near the New York City border. It is owned by Vici Properties and operated by MGM Resorts International.

== History ==
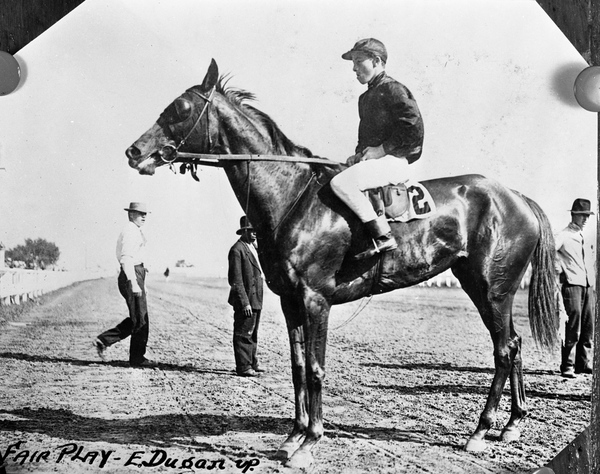
Fair Play and Eddie Dugan at Empire City Race Track, 1907

The original horse racing facility was opened in 1899 as Empire City Race Track by William H. Clark's 'Empire City Trotting Club. Clark died in 1900, and, with much litigation by his heirs over its proposed sale, the track remained closed for most of the next seven years except for special events. One such event occurred in 1902, when Barney Oldfield set a one-mile (1.6 km) record in an automobile at Empire City Race Track. Driving the 'Ford 999', he covered the distance in 55.54 seconds.

The facility was purchased by New York grocery store magnate James Butler, who reopened it for thoroughbred horse racing in 1907. Among the notable thoroughbreds who raced at Empire City, Seabiscuit won the Scarsdale Handicap in 1936, and the Butler Handicap in 1937. After Butler's death in 1934, the track continued to host "the flats" until 1942, when it was converted back to being a harness track. Some of its feature races were taken over by other New York area racetracks.

In 1950, William H. Cane, for whom the Cane Pace is named, headed a syndicate formed as the Algam Corporation which acquired Empire City and converted it to Yonkers Raceway. Its popularity having greatly declined since the 1960s (when crowds would occasionally reach 50,000), the entire property, according to some, had become an eyesore due to its owners leaving it in a state of disrepair.

In 1972, the Rooney family acquired Yonkers Raceway. It underwent some cosmetic changes in the late 1990s. It was used as a flea market, and hosted the annual Westchester County Fair, sponsored by the county's parks department. In 1996, the finish line was relocated to the end of the stretch, increasing the length of the stretch from 440 feet (130 m) to the current 660 feet (200 m). The following year, the grandstand was demolished. Sale of the site to the National Football League’s New York Jets for construction of a stadium was considered; however, the plan was shelved after the environmental impact statement showed there would be significant traffic from elsewhere in the metropolitan area, and there was not enough political support for it.

In 2015, Yonkers Raceway applied for permission from the New York State Gaming Commission to relocate its finish line back by approximately 100 feet. This proposal was endorsed by the New York division of the Standardbred Owners Association. As of 2018, the new finish line has been in use for a considerable period of time. In January 2018, Yonkers eliminated the "passing lane" in the stretch that allowed horses to be in the second spot on the inside in the stretch to move inside one spot and come up in the inside.

In January 2019, MGM Resorts International bought the racetrack and casino from the Rooney family for $850 million in cash and stock. MGM then immediately sold the land and buildings to its affiliated REIT, MGM Growth Properties, for $625 million, leasing back the property and structures for $50 million per year. Vici Properties acquired MGM Growth, including Empire City, in 2022.

=== Historic thoroughbred flat races ===
- Empire City Handicap (1900–1953)
- Mount Vernon Handicap (1907–1930)
- Yonkers Handicap (1907–1946)
- Fleetwing Handicap (1908–1953)
- Whirl Stakes (1908–1930)
- Empire City Derby (1917–1933)
- Scarsdale Handicap (1918–1947)
- Butler Handicap (1935–1953)
- Empire City Gold Cup (1947–1953)

== Empire City Casino at Yonkers Raceway ==
Empire City Casino
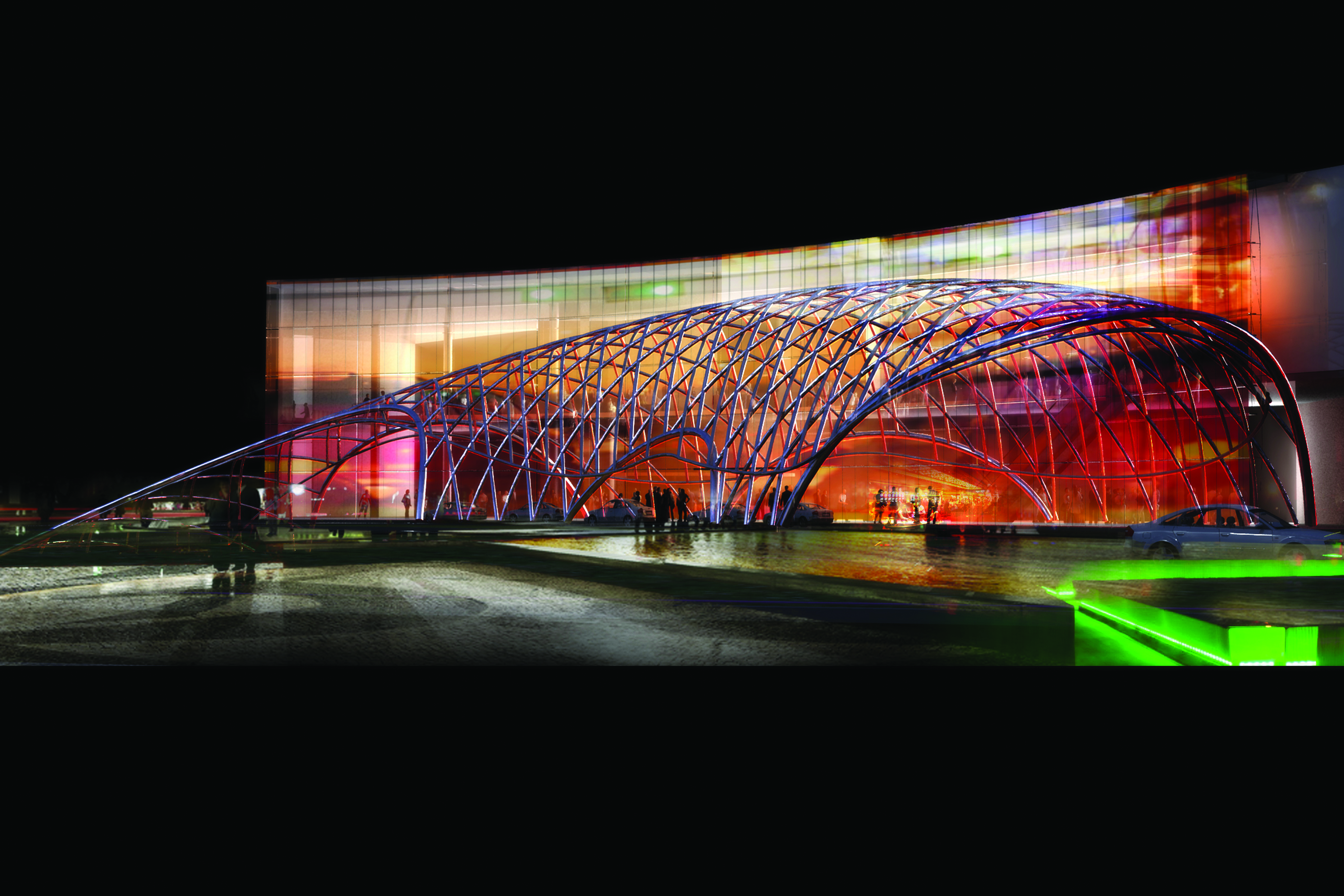
- Empire City Casino with expansion
- Interactive map of Empire City Casino
- Location: Yonkers, New York, United States
- Casino type: Land Based
- Operating license holder: MGM Resorts
- Website: https://empirecitycasino.mgmresorts.com/en.html

Yonkers Raceway had a $225-million renovation designed by EwingCole to put in more than 7,500 slot machines. The first phase opened on October 11, 2006, with 1,870 machines. Despite a "soft opening", with no major advertising or promotional campaigns, Yonkers netted $3.8 million in revenue in its first week, outpacing its nearest competitor, Saratoga Casino and Raceway, by two-thirds. The second phase of the project, which opened on December 28, 2006, added 120,000 square feet (11,000 m^{2}) of space to bring the total number of slot machines to 4,000. On March 12, 2007, the third phase opened to bring the slot machine total to 5,300. Because the facility falls under state lottery laws, the minimum age to play the slot machines at Empire City is 18, unlike the other area casinos, where it is 21.

In a report released in 2012, Empire City Casino at Yonkers Raceway was the state's "most successful casino and racing venue". Through 2011, the facility provided more than 3,000 jobs and contributed $262 million in "economic output".

In January 2013, Empire City Casino completed a new $50 million expansion designed by Studio V Architecture that added 66,000 square feet to the casino. The expansion featured a porte-cochere sculptural entrance; the largest window in the Northeast, a 300-foot-long and 27-foot-high depiction of the New York City skyline made entirely of nails; a new gaming floor with nearly 700 slot machines; and two new restaurants.

As of 2015, the casino hosts blackjack, craps, roulette, and baccarat tables in addition to the slot machines. The games are fully automated.

=== Restaurants ===
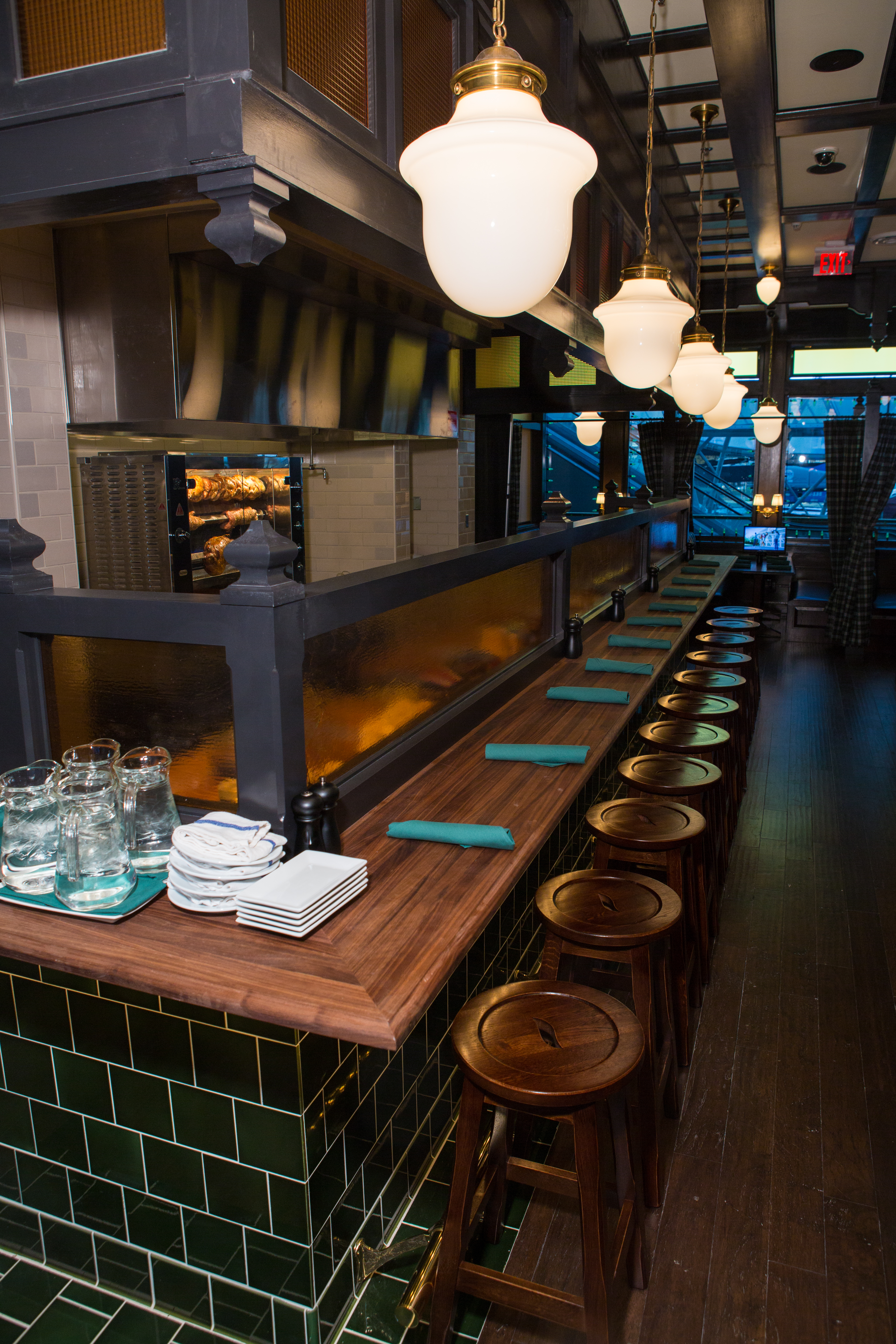
Dan Rooney's Café & Bar

- Dan Rooney's Café & Bar: The first restaurant to open in Empire City Casino's $50 million expansion is an Irish Pub styled after the original Dan Rooney's Café & Bar which was established in Pittsburgh in the early 1900s by the Rooney family. The train car dining room hosts 35 flat-screen televisions and nightly dueling pianos. "Two-time Michelin star winner and local New Yorker, Chef Christopher Lee" created the pub's menu which contains a burger that won the Greenwich Food & Wine Festival Burger Battle in 2012.
- Pinch: The second restaurant in Empire City Casino's expansion, Pinch, was created by Ducasse Studio, the consulting service of the "French chef and culinary impresario", Alain Ducasse. The name, Pinch, is "a playful take on pintxo (pronounced PEEN-cho), a type of Basque tapa, as well as a hint that the menu mixes a bit of this and a bit of that." Pinch seats 250 people and has an international menu.
- Alley 810: A Craft cocktail lounge, opening in 2013, that will have two bowling lanes.
- Nonno's Trattoria: A staple of Empire City, Nonno's Trattoria is a classic Italian Restaurant.
- Empire Terrace: A restaurant that overlooks the racetrack, allowing gamblers to dine while watching live races.

=== Expansion proposal ===
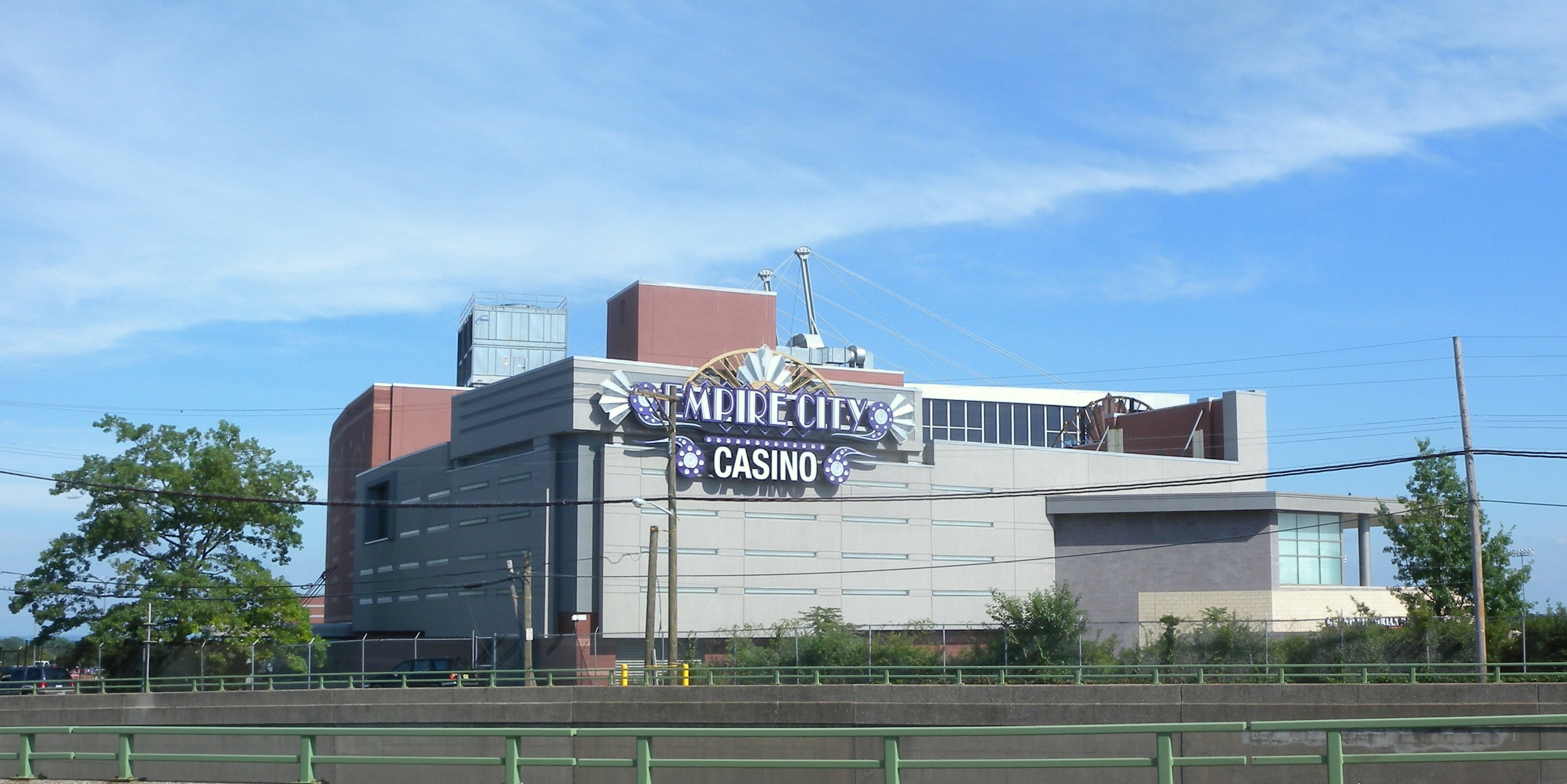
Exterior of the casino as seen in 2010

MGM Resorts was bidding for one of three downstate New York casino licenses. If awarded a license, they would have expanded the property. They would have redesigned the casino floor, developed a 5,000 seat performance venue and added a sportsbook. There would have also been nine new restaurants and five additional bars. There were plans for additional convention space. A new parking garage with 4,800 parking spaces would have accommodated the expanded property. MGM Resorts submitted their bid for a commercial casino license on June 26, 2025, the day before bids were due. The community advisory committee voted, 5–0, in favor of the proposed development on September 25, 2025. This vote advanced MGM's bid to be considered for a full casino license. MGM withdrew its application for a full casino license on October 14, 2025.

== Feature stakes races ==
=== History ===
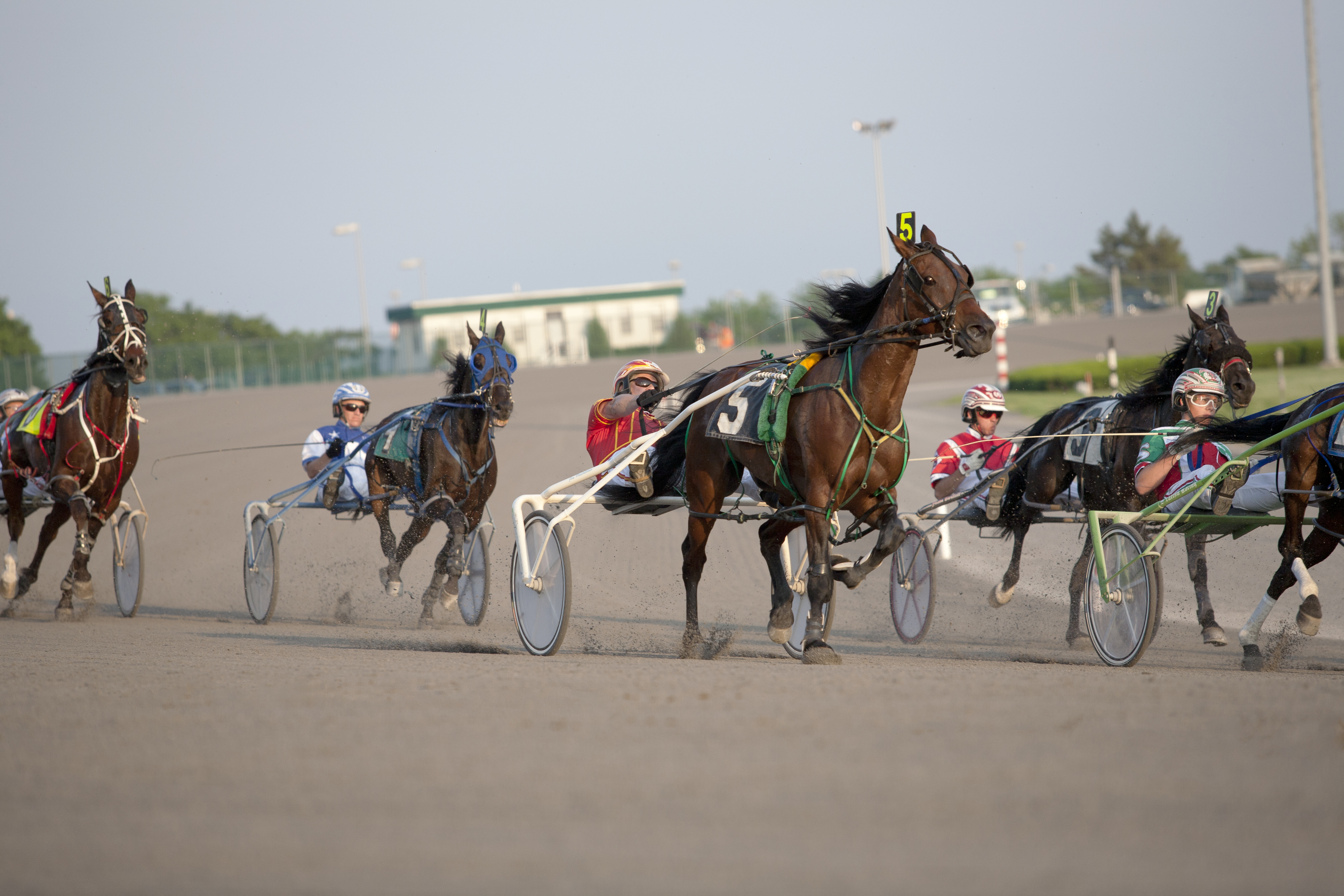
Racers on Yonkers Racetrack

Yonkers used to be the site of the Cane Pace, one of the legs of the Triple Crown of Harness Racing for Pacers. It is now the host track for another leg, the Messenger Stakes. Yonkers is also home to the Yonkers Trot, one of the legs of the Triple Crown of Harness Racing for Trotters. Due to the renovations at Yonkers, the Messenger and Yonkers Trot were moved to different racetracks for the 2004 and 2005 editions. The Messenger was moved to Harrington Raceway in Delaware in both years, and the Yonkers Trot was moved to Hawthorne Race Course in Stickney, IL in 2004, and Freehold Raceway in New Jersey in 2005.

Yonkers Raceway ran the Yonkers Trot and the Messenger on November 25, 2006, becoming the first harness track in America to host two Triple Crown races on the same day. Glidemaster, by virtue of winning the $728,000 Yonkers Trot, became the eighth horse to clinch the Trotting Triple Crown; the trotter would go on to be named 2006 Harness Horse of the Year.

Yonkers Raceway is also home to the Art Rooney Pace for three-year-olds. However, continued delays in the reopening of the track forced the 2006 edition of the race to be moved to Monticello Raceway. The final of the 2007 Art Rooney Pace, run on June 2, 2007, was the richest race in Yonkers history, with a $1 million purse. It was won by Southwind Lynx, driven by Tim Tetrick, with a late outside run in 1:52 3/5. The current track record for a trotting race horse is 1:54 3/5 set by Shutter Boy on October 30, 2009, with the trainer John McDermott and driver Yannick Gingras; this was not a stakes race.

=== Notable stakes races ===
- George Morton Levy Memorial Pacing Series
- Blue Chip Matchmaker
- Art Rooney Pace
- Lawrence B. Sheppard Pace
- Lismore Pace
- Yonkers Trot
- Hudson Filly Trot
- Messenger Stakes
- Lady Maud Pace
- New York Night of Champions
- Several New York Sire Stakes Events

== Transportation ==
The Metro-North Railroad offers a "one-day-getaway" package that includes a $10 free play and $10 food voucher, as well as free shuttle service to Empire City Casino from the Mount Vernon West train station. The station is served by the Harlem Line and offers direct service to New York City's Grand Central Terminal.

Several Bee-Line bus routes make stops at Empire City Casino as well, including routes 7, 20, 21, BxM4C, 430, 440, and 470.

== Cross Country ==
The track was the site of the 1941 USA Cross Country Championships.
