= Lady's Secret =

American-bred Thoroughbred racehorse

- Sire: Secretariat
- Grandsire: Bold Ruler
- Dam: Great Lady M.
- Damsire: Icecapade
- Sex: Mare
- Foaled: April 8, 1982; Lucas Farm in Oklahoma
- Died: March 4, 2003; Valley Creek Farm in Valley Center, California
- Country: United States
- Colour: Gray
- Breeder: Robert H. Spreen
- Owner: Mr. & Mrs. Eugene Klein
- Trainer: D. Wayne Lukas
- Record: 45: 25-9-3
- Earnings: $3,021,325

Major wins
- Moccasin Stakes (1984); The Darley Test (1985); Ballerina Handicap (1985); Monmouth Regret Stakes (1985); Ruffian Handicap (1985, 1986); Beldame Stakes (1985, 1986); Maskette Handicap (1985, 1986); Whitney Handicap (1986); Molly Pitcher Handicap (1986); Shuvee Handicap (1986) Breeders' Cup wins: Breeders' Cup Distaff (1986)

Awards
- U.S. Champion Older Filly (1986); United States Horse of the Year (1986)

Honours
- United States Racing Hall of Fame (1992) #76 - Top 100 U.S. Racehorses of the 20th Century; Lady's Secret Stakes at Monmouth Park Racetrack, since 1988; Lady's Secret Handicap at Remington Park, 1988–2007; Lady's Secret B.C. Handicap at Santa Anita Park, 1993–2011; Lady's Secret Café at Monmouth Park Racetrack; Lady's Secret Drive in Rancho Santa Fe, California
- Last updated on January 3, 2009

Lady's Secret (April 8, 1982 – March 4, 2003) was an American Eclipse Award winning Thoroughbred racemare. Nicknamed "The Iron Lady," she won multiple stakes races from 1984-1986, including the 1986 Breeders' Cup Distaff.

== Breeding and background ==
Lady's Secret was bred by Robert H. Spreen at Lucas Farm in Oklahoma. Spreen sold her for $200,000 to Mr. and Mrs. Eugene Klein (former owner of the San Diego Chargers), and she was prepared for racing by Hall of Fame trainer D. Wayne Lukas.

Lady's Secret was sired by U.S. Triple Crown champion Secretariat and out of Great Lady M., a daughter of Icecapade who was a half brother to Ruffian. Lady's Secret was also closely related to Ruffian on her sire's side since Secretariat and Reviewer (Ruffian's sire) shared a sire in Bold Ruler. She was a small horse, weighing no more than about 900 pounds.

== Racing record ==
Lady's Secret, who was a front runner, won twenty-five of her forty-five races and had nine second-place finishes. The daughter of Secretariat dominated the fillies she raced against and was also competitive against males.

After winning the Moccasin Stakes at age two, Lady's Secret won three important races at age three, including two Grade I events, and ran second to stablemate Life's Magic in the 1985 Breeders' Cup Distaff. In 1986, four-year-old Lady's Secret faced the nation's best male horses four times, winning one of those races and being victorious in ten of her fifteen total starts that season, all graded stakes races. Eight of these stakes wins were Grade 1 events, a single-season Grade 1 winning record only equaled by the champion Cigar during his undefeated 1995 campaign. Lady's Secret was the first female to win the Whitney Stakes since Gallorette in 1948.

She finished her year by winning the Breeders' Cup Distaff with Pat Day aboard. Her margin of victory was 2½ lengths in defeating a strong field that included Fran's Valentine and Outstandingly. Her lifetime earnings equaled $3,021,325.

Lady's Secret's performances throughout the 1986 racing season earned her the Eclipse Award for Outstanding Older Female Horse plus the most prestigious honor of all, and a rarity for fillies, the Eclipse Award for Horse of the Year for 1986. Lady's Secret is ranked number 76 by Blood-Horse magazine in their list of the Top 100 U.S. Thoroughbred champions of the 20th Century.

=== Record ===
Date	Track	Race Type	Finish
2 year old
5/21/1984	Belmont Park	Maiden Special Weight	1st
7/2/1984	Belmont Park	Astoria Stakes	5th
7/7/1984	Hollywood Park	Landaluce Stakes	4th
7/23/1984	Hollywood Park	Wavy Waves Stakes	1st
8/8/1984	Del Mar	Junior Miss Stakes	4th
10/8/1984	Santa Anita	Anoakia Stakes	3rd
10/20/1984	Santa Anita	Oak Leaf Stakes	5th
11/9/1984	Hollywood Park	Moccasin Stakes	1st
3 year old
1/5/1985	Bay Meadows	Hail Hilarious Stakes	1st
1/12/1985	Bay Meadows	Determine Stakes	2nd
1/30/1985	Santa Anita	Santa Ynez Stakes	5th
2/23/1985	Golden Gate	Vallejo Stakes	2nd
4/16/1985	Oaklawn Park	Prima Donna Stakes	1st
4/28/1985	Aqueduct	Prioress Stakes	2nd
5/11/1985	Belmont Park	Comely Stakes	4th
5/26/1985	Belmont Park	Bowl of Flowers Stakes	1st
6/22/1985	Monmouth Park	Regret Handicap	1st
7/6/1985	Belmont Park	Rose Stakes	1st
8/1/1985	Saratoga	Test Stakes	1st
8/9/1985	Saratoga	Ballerina Stakes	1st
9/7/1985	Belmont Park	Maskette Stakes	1st
9/22/1985	Belmont Park	Ruffian Handicap	1st
10/13/1985	Belmont Park	Beldame Stakes	1st
11/2/1985	Aqueduct	Breeders' Cup Distaff	2nd
12/27/1985	Santa Anita	La Brea Stakes	2nd
4 year old
1/18/1986	Santa Anita	El Encino Stakes	1st
2/9/1986	Santa Anita	La Canada Stakes	1st
2/23/1986	Santa Anita	Santa Margarita Invitational Handicap	1st
4/16/1986	Oaklawn Park	Apple Blossom Handicap	2nd
5/17/1986	Belmont Park	Shuvee Handicap	1st
5/26/1986	Belmont Park	Metropolitan Handicap	3rd
6/8/1986	Belmont Park	Hempstead Handicap	2nd
7/5/1986	Monmouth Park	Molly Pitcher Handicap	1st
8/2/1986	Saratoga	Whitney Handicap	1st
8/16/1986	Monmouth Park	Philip H. Iselin Handicap	3rd
8/30/1986	Belmont Park	Woodward Stakes	2nd
9/6/1986	Belmont Park	Maskette Stakes	1st
9/21/1986	Belmont Park	Ruffian Handicap	1st
10/12/1986	Belmont Park	Beldame Stakes	1st
11/1/1986	Santa Anita	Breeders' Cup Distaff	1st
5 year old
3/14/1987	Gulfstream Park	Donn Handicap	6th
6/13/1987	Monmouth Park	Allowance	1st
7/4/1987	Monmouth Park	Molly Pitcher Handicap	2nd
7/21/1987	Monmouth Park	Allowance	1st
8/10/1987	Saratoga	Allowance	DNF

== Breeding record ==
Retired at age five, in 1989 Lady's Secret was sold to Fares Farm in Lexington, Kentucky, as a broodmare. She and Azeri are the only two female winners of the Eclipse Award for Horse of the Year to have produced foals by more than one stallion who was also Horse of the Year (Lady's Secret produced foals by Seattle Slew and Skip Away). She produced 12 foals, with 10 starters and 5 winners. Despite being sired by several champion thoroughbreds, none of her progeny were of particular note.

Foaled	Name	Sire	Sex
1989	Machikane Aida	Alydar	Mare
1990	Secrets Told	Alydar	Mare
1992	Good Looks	Mr. Prospector	Mare
1993	Lady Danzig	Danzig	Mare
1994	Excellent Secret	Mr. Prospector	Colt
1995	Sleepinginseattle	Seattle Slew	Mare
1996	Agnes Liner	Seattle Slew	Mare
1997	Famous Again	Thunder Gulch	Colt
2000	Bear Witness	Skip Away	Gelding

== Death ==
On March 4, 2003, Lady's Secret died from foaling complications at Valley Creek Farm in Valley Center, California.

== Honors ==
In 1988, the inaugural Lady's Secret Stakes was held at Monmouth Park Racetrack, and is still run today. The Lady's Secret Café, which is also located at Monmouth Park is named in her honor. Also in 1988, a Lady's Secret Handicap was run at Remington Park in Oklahoma City, Oklahoma, and was held there until being discontinued in 2007. There were also one-off stakes races in her name at Gulfstream Park in 1989, and Les Bois Park in 2014.

In 1992, Lady's Secret was inducted into the National Museum of Racing and Hall of Fame.

In 1993, a major race at Santa Anita Park in Arcadia, California, was named in her honor. In 2012, the race was renamed to the Zenyatta Stakes, after the 2010 American Horse of the Year who won that race in 2008, 2009 and 2010.

Lady's Secret Drive in Del Rayo Estates, Rancho Santa Fe, California, where her owner lived, was also named in her memory.

Valley Creek Farm has since been sold. The new owner is in the process of developing The Lady's Secret Memorial Garden as a tribute to the great race mare.

== Pedigree ==
Pedigree of Lady's Secret (USA), grey mare, 1982
Sire Secretariat 1970	Bold Ruler; 1954	Nasrullah (IRE)	Nearco
Sire Secretariat 1970	Bold Ruler; 1954	Nasrullah (IRE)	Mumtaz Begum
Sire Secretariat 1970	Bold Ruler; 1954	Miss Disco	Discovery
Sire Secretariat 1970	Bold Ruler; 1954	Miss Disco	Outdone
Sire Secretariat 1970	Somethingroyal; 1952	Princequillo (IRE)	Prince Rose
Sire Secretariat 1970	Somethingroyal; 1952	Princequillo (IRE)	Cosquilla
Sire Secretariat 1970	Somethingroyal; 1952	Imperatrice	Caruso
Sire Secretariat 1970	Somethingroyal; 1952	Imperatrice	Cinquepace
Dam Great Lady M 1975	Icecapade; 1969	Nearctic (CAN)	Nearco
Dam Great Lady M 1975	Icecapade; 1969	Nearctic (CAN)	Lady Angela
Dam Great Lady M 1975	Icecapade; 1969	Shenanigans	Native Dancer
Dam Great Lady M 1975	Icecapade; 1969	Shenanigans	Bold Irish
Dam Great Lady M 1975	Sovereign Lady; 1969	Young Emperor (GB)	Grey Sovereign
Dam Great Lady M 1975	Sovereign Lady; 1969	Young Emperor (GB)	Young Empress
Dam Great Lady M 1975	Sovereign Lady; 1969	Sweety Kid	Olympia
Dam Great Lady M 1975	Sovereign Lady; 1969	Sweety Kid	Trustworthy (Family: 22-d)
