= Icecapade =

American-bred Thoroughbred racehorse

- Sire: Nearctic
- Grandsire: Nearco
- Dam: Shenanigans
- Damsire: Native Dancer
- Sex: Stallion
- Foaled: 1969
- Country: United States
- Color: Gray
- Breeder: Stuart S. Janney Jr. & Barbara Phipps Janney
- Owner: 1) Locust Hill Farm (Stuart S. Janney Jr.), Glyndon, Maryland; 2) Akiko McVarish
- Trainer: Frank Y. Whiteley Jr., David A. Whiteley
- Record: 32: 13-6-1
- Earnings: US$256,468

Major wins
- Kelso Handicap (Delaware Park) (1972); Longport Handicap (1972); Saranac Stakes (1972); Atlantic City Handicap (1973); Nassau County Handicap (1973); William du Pont Jr. Handicap (1973)

Honors
- Icecapade Stakes @ Monmouth Park

Icecapade (April 4, 1969 – November 12, 1988) was an American Thoroughbred racehorse that had success in racing and became an important sire. Icecapade was a multiple Stakes race winner who set a Monmouth Park track record that stood for nineteen years.

== Background ==
Icecapade was bred and initially raced by Stuart S. Janney Jr. and his wife Barbara Phipps Janney under the name of Locust Hill Farm. He was campaigned for several seasons by Locust Hill Farm before being privately sold for more than $450,000 to Mrs. D.A. McVarish.

Icecapade was bred on same nick as the extremely influential sire Northern Dancer, being by Nearctic out of a Native Dancer mare. His dam Shenanigans was the 1975 Kentucky Broodmare of the Year and dam of Ruffian.

== Racing career ==
Icecapade was considered a sprinter/miler as a racehorse. His most notable wins include the 1973 Grade 3 Nassau County Handicap and Grade 2 William du Pont, Jr. Handicap. At Monmouth Park, he set the track record for 6 furlongs, running the distance in 1:08 flat.

== Breeding career ==
Icecapade was retired to stand at stud at Gainesway Farm, where he sired 73 stakes winners.

In the Roman-Miller Dosage System, Icecapade is considered a Brilliant/Classic chef-de-race.

=== Notable progeny ===
Icecapade's major stakes winners include:

c = colt, f = filly, g = gelding

Foaled	Name	Sex	Major Wins
1975	Great Lady M.	f	La Brea Stakes, Las Cienegas Handicap, Rancho Bernardo Handicap
1976	Clever Trick	c	Gravesend Handicap, notable sire
1976	Ice Cool	c	Premio Tevere
1980	Am Capable	f	Affectionately Handicap, Distaff Handicap, Interborough Handicap
1980	Fatih	c	Golden Gate Handicap, Arcadia Handicap
1980	Hyperborean	c	Swaps Stakes
1980	Kingsbridge	c	Breeders' Stakes, Summer Stakes, Toronto Cup Handicap
1980	Wild Again	c	Breeders' Cup Classic, Meadowlands Cup Handicap, Oaklawn Handicap, New Orleans Handicap
1981	Don Rickles	c	Nashua Stakes
1986	Ski Champ	c	Gran Premio 25 de Mayo, Premio América
1986	Wonders Delight	f	Alcibiades Stakes, Schuylerville Stakes
1987	Izvestia	c	Canadian Horse of the Year (1990), Triple Crown, and Hall of Fame – Queen's Plate Stakes, Prince of Wales Stakes, Breeders' Stakes, etc.

=== Notable progeny of daughters ===
Major stakes winners out of mares by Icecapade include: c = colt, f = filly, g = gelding

Foaled	Name	Sex	Major Wins
1982	Lady's Secret	f	American Horse of the Year (1986) and Hall of Fame – Breeders' Cup Distaff, Beldame Stakes, Ruffian Handicap, Maskette Stakes, Whitney Handicap, Shuvee Handicap, Santa Margarita Invitational Handicap, La Canada Stakes, Ballerina Stakes, Test Stakes, etc.
1986	Markofdistinction	c	Queen Elizabeth II Stakes, Queen Anne Stakes
1987	Brought to Mind	f	Vanity Invitational Handicap, Milady Handicap, La Brea Stakes, Hawthorne Handicap
1989	Siberian Summer	c	Charles H. Strub Stakes
1994	Dantelah	f	Oakleigh Plate, Swettenham Stud Stakes
1995	Sister Act	f	Hempstead Handicap, La Troienne Stakes

== Pedigree ==
Pedigree of Icecapade, gray stallion, 1969
Sire Nearctic	Nearco	Pharos	Phalaris
Sire Nearctic	Nearco	Pharos	Scapa Flow
Sire Nearctic	Nearco	Nogara	Havresac
Sire Nearctic	Nearco	Nogara	Catnip
Sire Nearctic	Lady Angela	Hyperion	Gainsborough
Sire Nearctic	Lady Angela	Hyperion	Selene
Sire Nearctic	Lady Angela	Sister Sarah	Abbots Trace
Sire Nearctic	Lady Angela	Sister Sarah	Sarita
Dam Shenanigans	Native Dancer	Polynesian	Unbreakable
Dam Shenanigans	Native Dancer	Polynesian	Black Polly
Dam Shenanigans	Native Dancer	Geisha	Discovery
Dam Shenanigans	Native Dancer	Geisha	Miyako
Dam Shenanigans	Bold Irish	Fighting Fox	Sir Gallahad
Dam Shenanigans	Bold Irish	Fighting Fox	Marguerite
Dam Shenanigans	Bold Irish	Erin	Transmute
Dam Shenanigans	Bold Irish	Erin	Rosey O’Grady (family: 1-h)
