= Racehorse injuries =

Racehorse injuries and fatalities are a side effect of the training and competition of horse racing. Racehorse injuries are considered especially difficult to treat, and often result in euthanizing the horse. A 2005 study by the United States Department of Agriculture found that injuries are the second leading cause of death in horses, second only to old age.

Two years after Secretariat's record-breaking US Triple Crown took the sport in the United States to a new level of popularity, the breakdown and death of Ruffian brought on a new era of safety concerns. The breakdown and death of racehorses at races had been known of for centuries, but had never before been witnessed in an event so widely seen as the great match race between Ruffian and Foolish Pleasure at Belmont Park, with 18 million viewers. The horse racing industry has been trying to adapt to increased safety concerns ever since.

== History ==
Accidents and disputes were so bad in the early 1700s in England that soon after nobility first started racing Thoroughbreds, participants were ending up in court. The "Sport of Kings" has been described as an exercise in controlled chaos, with the jockeys described as "daredevils," and the racehorses as "unpredictable." As a response to this, stewardship of racing began to evolve in 1751 when the first set of recorded racing rules were printed and in 1752 when Britain's Jockey Club started to become racing's first regulatory authority.

In 1990, apprentice jockey Benny Narvaez was paralyzed from the chest down after his horse threw him while jumping over another horse who had broken down directly in front of him during a race at Tampa Bay Downs. A jury found that Tampa Bay Downs was responsible for Narvaez's injury because the track veterinarian failed to perform an adequate pre-race examination on the horse that broke down.

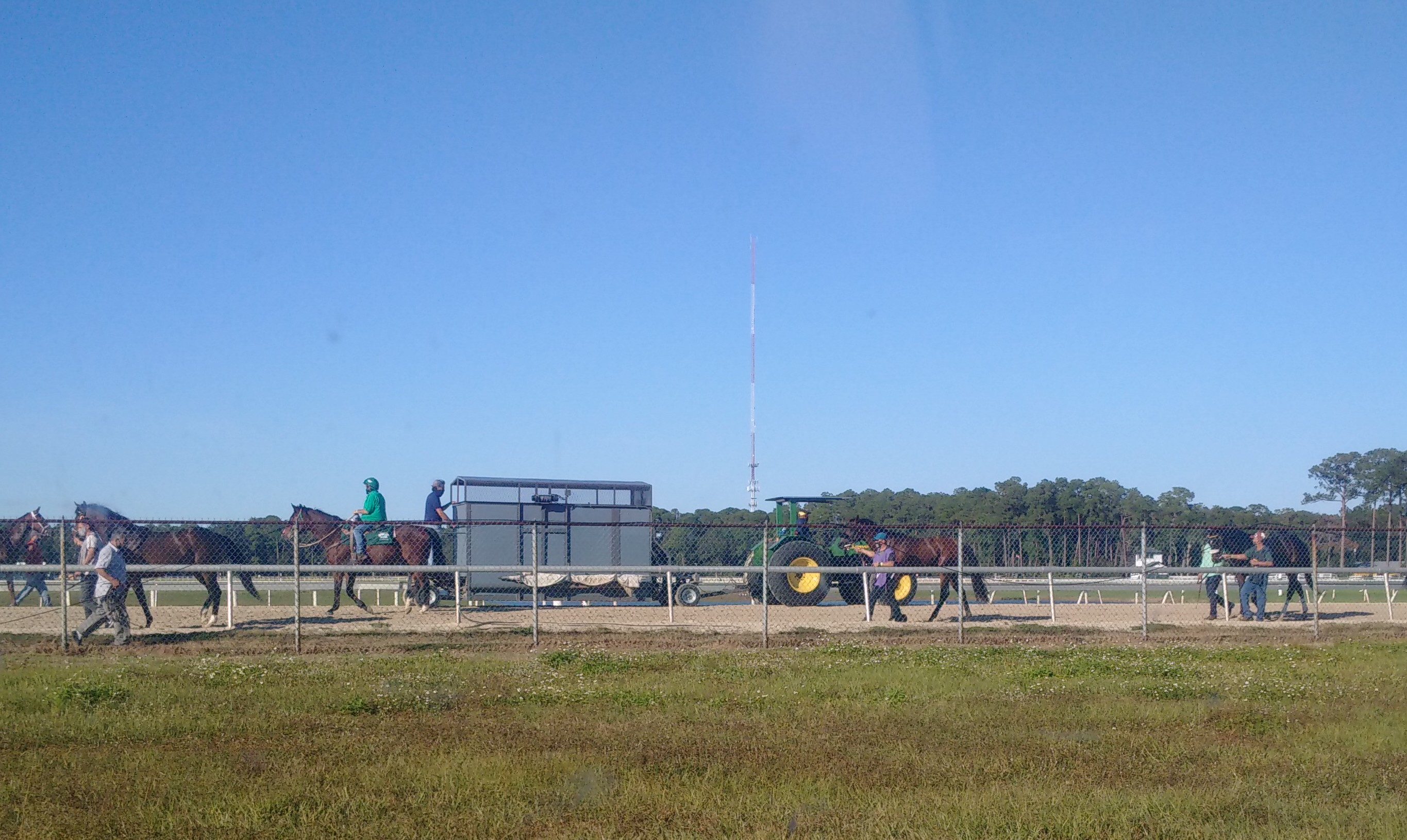
Removing an injured horse (in trailer) from the racetrack, following a race (2020)

National television coverage of the Breeders' Cup by NBC helped generate millions of dollars in revenue and publicity for Thoroughbred racing in the mid- to late 1980s. Since the inaugural running of the event in 1984, there has been an injury in almost every Breeders' Cup race. This national publicity backfired when horse racing increasingly came under attack from animal rights groups in the early 1990s. In the 1990 Breeders' Cup Distaff, champion two-year-old and three-year-old filly Go For Wand got back up after breaking her ankle. She was unable to finish the race; however, she did stand up. Handlers caught her and made her lie down; she was immediately euthanized on the track. In the 1992 Breeders' Cup Sprint, the five-year-old European horse Mr Brooks fractured his cannon bone and fell on top of his jockey, Lester Piggott. Piggott had told fellow European jockey Walter Swinburn before the race that the horse did not warm up well. Mr Brooks had also been reluctant to go in the starting gate before the race. There was so much controversy over the handling of Mr Brooks that the Breeders' Cup implemented rigid pre-race inspections in 1993. The resulting media pressure from the deaths of Go For Wand and Mr Brooks prompted racing industries around the world to make a concerted effort at determining the extent of the problem and the causes.

As evidenced by the death of 2006 Kentucky Derby winner Barbaro, not all racehorse fatalities are the direct result of injury. It was not the break in Barbaro's leg that necessitated his destruction, but the hoof disease laminitis. Barbaro's team of doctors, led by Dr. Dean Richardson, were able to repair his broken leg, but not the excruciatingly painful laminitis that followed. Support limb laminitis, which is the specific type Barbaro had, is caused by over-stressing the good leg during recovery from an injury in the opposite limb. A 1986 survey done by the Morris Animal Foundation found that laminitis was the fourth leading cause of death among horses. AAEP members ranked laminitis as the most important disease needing further research in 2009.

After the death of Barbaro in 2006, the North American Thoroughbred industry realized that individual studies were not adequate tools for evaluating ongoing efforts in injury prevention. The idea for an equine injury database came from the first Welfare and Safety of the Racehorse Summit in 2006. The database has three objectives: 1) to identify the frequency, type, and outcome of horse racing injuries using a standardized format that will generate valid composite statistics; 2) identify markers for horses at increased risk of injury; and 3) to serve as a data source for research directed at improving safety and preventing injuries. The Equine Injury Database (EID) was launched in 2008 following a one-year pilot project where injury reports were submitted by racetracks in a hard copy form. InCompass Solutions, Inc. and The Jockey Club Technology Services, Inc., subsidiaries of The Jockey Club, underwrote the costs of the database. Since the start of the EID, there has been a downward trend in the rate of fatalities. This trend has been found to be statistically significant.

In 2020, the federal Horseracing Integrity and Safety Act of 2020 was passed, establishing the Horseracing Integrity and Safety Authority (HISA). In 2022, the Horseracing Integrity and Welfare Unit (HIWU) was established as the anti-doping and medication control arm of HISA.

Overall Equine Injury Database Results
Year	Fatal injuries	Starts	Fatalities per 1000 starts
2009	790	395,897	2.00
2010	727	387,671	1.88
2011	713	379,285	1.88
2012	709	369,565	1.92
2013	643	339,104	1.90
2014	583	308,923	1.89
2015	500	306,654	1.63
2016	483	314,359	1.54
2017	493	305,929	1.61
2018	493	293,555	1.68
2019	441	288,565	1.53
2020	333	254,200	1.39
2021	366	264,200	1.39
2022	328	262,761	1.25
2023	336	253,640	1.32
2024	273	244,743	1.11
2025	251	235,625	1.07

== Classification ==
Racehorse injuries are distinguished in their classification by whether they are considered accidents or injuries. Injuries are considered to follow predictable patterns, and accidents are unpredictable. The science of injury prevention has demonstrated that injuries and the events leading up to injuries are not random. Like disease, they follow a distinct pattern. Studying these patterns has made it possible to learn to predict and prevent injuries from occurring. Injuries, whether unintentional or intentional, can be considered any physical damage or harm caused to the body resulting in impairment or destruction of health. Injuries lead to death, disability, and financial loss.

== International Thoroughbred fatality rates ==
Comparing injury and fatality rates among countries can be difficult due to different definitions used in collecting data.

=== Flat racing ===
Flat racing fatality rates
Country	Fatal injury rate (Note: Rate statistics are based on occurrences per 1,000 starts.)	Definition	Time period
Hong Kong	0.6	Euthanized within 5 days of fracture	2004−2011
Australia	0.6	Immediate euthanasia	1988−1995
New Zealand	0.41	Failure to finish that resulted in fatality	2005−2011
North America	1.69	Fatality within 72 hours of race date	2009−2023
Great Britain	0.76	Death or euthanasia on race day	2000−2013
South America	0.62	Death or euthanasia following a race	2005−2015
Brazil	0.88	Death or euthanasia within 24 hours of a race	1996−2006

In Japan from 1985 to 1994, 0.32% of runners died or were euthanized as a direct result of fractures sustained while racing.

In Venezuela, at Hipódromo La Rinconada in 2009, 7% of horses in training died, including 51 (40%) due to limb fractures.

Flat racing injury rates
Country	Injury rate (Note: Rate statistics are based on occurrences per 1,000 starts.)	Definition	Time period
Hong Kong	2.8	Fracture incurred during a race	2004−2011
Australia	2.9	Euthanasia or failure to race within 6 months	1988−1995
South Africa	0.56	Retirement or immediate euthanasia	1998−2011
New Zealand	0.93	Failure to finish and associated veterinary event	2005−2011
South America	1.82	Musculoskeletal injury incurred during a race	2005−2015
Brazil	2.68	Serious injury incurred during a race or death/euthanasia within 24 hours of a race	1996−2006

In Japan from 1987 to 2000, 1.83% of runners had an acute bone fracture incurred during a race that resulted in failure to race within three months or permanent retirement, euthanasia, or death.

=== Jump racing ===
Jumps racing has long been steeped in controversy due to its high mortality rate. This brand of racing requires Thoroughbred horses to leap over a succession of fences and are generally longer distances than non-jump races. There are hurdle races (shorter distances and lower obstacles), and steeplechase races (longer distances and higher obstacles). Animal welfare groups have been campaigning for around 30 years to abolish hurdle and steeplechase events in Australia. Many aspects to the sport pose serious risk to horses, and it harms horses at a higher rate than flat racing. In 1991, an Australian Senate Select Committee address on animal welfare concluded they had serious concerns about the welfare of horses in jumps races and recommended that state governments across the country phase out jumps racing over a three-year period. New South Wales and Tasmania abandoned the sport in 1997 and 2008 respectively, but Victoria and South Australia continued the races. Jumps racing has never been the massive industry in Australia that it is in Britain and Ireland, but even there some tracks have discontinued National Hunt racing. Nottingham was the first to discontinue jumps racing in 1996, followed by Windsor in 1998 (where it is being reinstated for the 2024/25 season) and Wolverhampton in 2002. Lingfield and Kempton have considered discontinuing jumps racing as well.

Jump racing fatality rates
Country	Type	Fatal injury rate (Note: Rate statistics are based on occurrences per 1,000 starts.)	Definition	Time period
Australia	Hurdle	6.3	Immediate euthanasia	1988−1995
Australia	Steeplechase	14.3	Immediate euthanasia	1988−1995
New Zealand	Hurdle	5.9	Died or euthanized on race day or euthanized within 72 hours of race completion as a result of musculoskeletal injury or sudden death	2011−2022
New Zealand	Steeplechase	5.4	Died or euthanized on race day or euthanized within 72 hours of race completion as a result of musculoskeletal injury or sudden death	2011−2022
Great Britain	Hurdle	4.6	Death or euthanasia whilst still at the racecourse subsequent to a race start	2000−2009
Great Britain	Steeplechase	6.2	Death or euthanasia whilst still at the racecourse subsequent to a race start	2000−2009
Great Britain	National Hunt Flat	2.7	Death or euthanasia whilst still at the racecourse subsequent to a race start	2000−2009

== Biological systems and associated injuries ==
Injuries are a consequence of demand exceeding the capacity of the tissues and structures of the biological systems. The musculoskeletal system is by far the most commonly injured system.

System	Percentage of fatal injuries	Percentage of non-fatal career ending injuries (NFCEI)
Musculoskeletal	97%	~81%
Respiratory	1%	~10%
Integumentary	1%	~2%
Cardiovascular	1%	

=== Musculoskeletal system ===
The musculoskeletal system consists of the bones, cartilage, muscles, ligaments, and tendons.

Skeletal fractures account for 87% of fatal injuries. When a horse's leg hits the ground at racing speed on a straightaway, it bears a load that is three times its weight (with the exception of harness racing). When negotiating a turn, centrifugal force increases the load to between 5 and 10 times body weight. When a horse hits the ground, the repetitive impact produces microscopic cracks and crevices inside bone so tiny they are undetectable by standard X-rays. If the horse is not given enough time for healthy bone tissue to repair the damage with a process called remodeling, the cumulative stress can progress silently to the point where overload causes bones to break. In a 2009 white paper, the American Association of Equine Practitioners (AAEP) recommended a period of rest of at least 10 days between races for all horses to provide an opportunity to refresh and diminish the volume of persistent cyclic loading.

Bucked shins is an inflammatory condition of the cannon bones. Bucked shins is a result of strain and excessive concussion to the cannon bone. The concussion comes from the rigorous training regimen that two-year-olds often face and inability of the bone to adapt fast enough. 70% of young Thoroughbred racehorses in training develop the problem, usually in the first six months. As horses become older, the cannon bone becomes stiffer and thus bucked shins rarely occur again. Approximately 12% of horses that develop bucked shins go on to have stress or saucer fractures later. Bucked shins force 7% of racehorses to retire.

Splints are new bone formation (exostoses) along the involved splint bone. In the young horse the interosseous ligament which attaches the splint bones to the cannon can become damaged or torn from the concussive and rotational forces of exercise. This will cause heat, pain and swelling in the area between the splint and the cannon. In an attempt to stabilise this damaged attachment, new bone will be laid down around the ligament resulting in the formation of a bony lump known as a splint. The size and position of this bony lump determine whether a splint is likely to cause long-term lameness. The lump can interfere with the knee joint or the suspensory ligament, which runs down the back of the cannon bone. Splints force 7% of racehorses to retire.

Luxations are joint dislocations and account for 8% of fatal injuries. Fetlock luxations account for 91% of all fatal luxation injuries. Due to the construction of the fetlock joint, luxation will result in either a complete rupture of the flexor tendons and suspensory ligament or a lateral disarticulation. The joint capsule may also be completely ruptured and the articular portion of the bones exposed to view.

An osselet is inflammation (arthritis) of the metacarpophalangeal joint (fetlock) of the equine front leg. Osselets are a result of trauma, such as hard, heavy, or fast use, a slip or fall, or a direct blow to the joint. When the fetlock suffers trauma, enzymes and other agents from the joint lining are released that destroy tissue inside the joint. As the condition worsens, so does the horse's lameness, and the interior structures of the joints become more and more irritated. Osselets force 16% of racehorses to retire.

Carpitis is inflammation (arthritis) of the carpal joint (knee). Carpitis is caused by overextension of the carpus. Knee injuries, the second most common non-fatal career-ending injury, force 16% of racehorses to retire.

A ruptured tendon usually refers to the complete separation of a tendon. Tendon separation results in a complete loss of the tendon fibers, a marked increase in tendon cross-sectional area, and loss of support in the limb. A totally ruptured superficial digital flexor tendon (SDFT) will cause a visible drop in the angle of the fetlock. Catastrophic ruptured tendons account for as much as 3% of all tendon injuries.

Tendinitis is inflammation of a tendon. Tendons connect muscles to bone and normally have an elastic property so that they can stretch. Tendinitis occurs when the tendon is overstretched or overloaded, which causes straining (tearing) of individual or multiple fibers and the formation of a lesion. A lesion is strained tendon fibers with associated hemorrhage (bleeding) and edema (fluid retention). Often strained tendons go undetected or may be subclinical before the clinical signs of tendonitis are observed. Tendinitis is characterized by heat, swelling, and pain. Racehorses often experience tendinitis when transitioning from sedentary activity to conditioning work; thus, young horses and those returning to exercise from lay-off are those most expected to suffer from tendinitis. The incidence of tendon injuries is approximately 30% among Thoroughbred racehorses in training, mostly in the SDFT of the forelimbs. Horsemen frequently refer to tendonitis as bowed tendon due to the bowed appearance of the SDFT. Bowed tendons force 25% of racehorses to retire and are the most common non-fatal career-ending injury. Racehorses are so often retired after tendinitis because as many as 70% will not be able to return to their previous level of performance and more than 66% of them will have a recurrence of injury.

Tendinosis is chronic degeneration of a tendon without inflammation. It is caused by repetitive microtrauma and aging. Tendinosis is characterized by painful thickening and structural changes of the tendon. Tendinosis predisposes horses for Tendinitis and catastrophic ruptured tendons.

Desmitis is inflammation of a ligament. Ligaments connect bone to bone and, depending on individual function, are either compliant or noncompliant. Ligaments have less elasticity than tendons and can therefore be injured easily. Desmitis occurs most often when a horse overstrides, which causes a sprain (tear). Some occurrences of desmitis may be difficult to detect because the ligament is deep within tissue. An injury to the collateral ligament of the fetlock predisposes the horse to fetlock luxation, the second most common fatal injury.

=== Respiratory system ===
The equine respiratory system consists of the nostrils, pharynx (throat), larynx (voice box), trachea (windpipe), diaphragm, and lungs.

Exercise induced pulmonary hemorrhage (EIPH) is bleeding in the lungs. There are many theories regarding the causes of EIPH. The most widely accepted theory is that the high blood pressure from heavy exercise coupled with vacuum-like effects that occur during a deep inhalation causes the capillaries to rupture. The prevalence of EIPH varies with the method used to detect it and the frequency with which horses are examined. Almost all Thoroughbred racehorses in active training have some degree of EIPH, as many as 93% according to The Merck Veterinary Manual. When examined after each of three races, 87% of Standardbred racehorses had evidence of EIPH on at least one occasion, suggesting that EIPH is as common in Standardbred racehorses as it is in Thoroughbred racehorses. Higher degrees of EIPH undoubtedly result in poor performance and, on rare occasions, death.

Epistaxis is EIPH characterized by blood appearing at the nostrils. Epistaxis is observed in approximately 5% of horses with EIPH. There are slight differences in the definition of a "bleeder" in various racing jurisdictions throughout the world. Some jurisdictions define bleeding as the appearance of blood at both nostrils, while other jurisdictions only require the appearance of blood at one nostril. There are also various regulations for each incident of bleeding throughout the world.

Country	1st incident	2nd incident	3rd incident
Australia	3 month ban	Retirement	
South Africa	3 month ban	6 month ban	Retirement
Hong Kong	3 month ban	3 month ban or retirement	Retirement
Japan	1 month ban	2 month ban	3 month ban
Great Britain	None	None	None
United States	None	None	None

=== Integumentary system ===
The integumentary system consists of the skin, hooves, hair, and glands.

Hoof cracks are separations or breaks in the wall of a hoof. The most common type of hoof cracks are quarter cracks, which occur at the quarter, the thinnest and most delicate part of the hoof wall. Injury to the site may be the result of common things such as hard racetracks and uneven surfaces. Quarter cracks originate from the coronet and run down the hoof wall, rather than a sand crack that begins at the ground surface and runs up the hoof wall. Hoof cracks force 2% of racehorses to retire.

== Risk factors ==
The international community has identified important risk factors for injury or fatality in horse racing, with over 200 having been scientifically investigated. These include horse-related risk factors such as age, gender, and breeding; management-related risk factors such as training, medication, stewardship, economics, and jockeys; race-related factors such as type (flat or jump), distance, and field size; and track-related factors such as weather, surface, maintenance, and design. Injury, in particular catastrophic injury, is a multi‐factorial event that involves the complex interaction of a number of risk factors. The effect of each individual factor and its importance can be measured by evaluating its relative risk.

=== Horse-related ===
==== Sex ====
Male horses are overall at a higher risk of catastrophic injury than female horses, with an overall odds ratio of 1.48. This does vary by study and country, including odds ratios of 1.12 in 1.61 in Australia, 1.76 in Canada, the United Kingdom, and 1.52–2.21 in the United States.

In South America, the overall odds ratio of fatalities for male versus female horses is 1.48, although it varies from 1.30 to 1.99, depending on the racecourse.

Although there is mixed data, entire males are at an overall higher risk of catastrophic injury than geldings, with an overall odds ratio of 1.36, although that value is not statistically significant.

==== Age ====
Overall, older horses are at a higher risk of catastrophic injury, with an overall odds ratio per year of 1.19. This does vary by study and country, including odds ratios of 1.08 in Australia, 1.03 in Canada, 1.24 in the United Kingdom, and 1.44 in the United States.

In South America, age was found to be statistically significant in one of four tracks studied, with an odds ratio of 1.18 per year of age.

The EID reports age in three categories: 2-year-olds, 3-year-olds, and 4-year-olds and older.

2009–2024 EID statistics
Age	Starts	Fatalities	per 1000 starts
2-year-olds	400,987	509	1.27
3-year-olds	1,427,086	2,368	1.66
4-year-olds and older	3,134,337	5,145	1.70

==== Breeding and genetics ====
There has been a lot of debate since 2006 about how sound the Thoroughbred is today compared to the 1960s and earlier. The only data pertaining to the subject involves the average number of starts per horse, which The Jockey Club started tracking in 1950.

Year	Average starts	Starts	Starters
2020	5.26	245,506	46,683
2010	6.11	417,192	68,235
2000	7.10	493,682	69,569
1990	7.94	712,494	89,716
1980	9.21	593,849	64,506
1970	10.22	488,326	47,778
1960	11.31	337,060	29,798
1950	10.91	244,343	22,388

Horse conformation, which is a visible outcome of breeding practices, clearly plays a significant role in injury.

Some genetic variants have been found to be associated with fracture risk in Thoroughbreds, including variants in ZNF804A and MSTN. Superficial digital flexor tendon injuries have an estimated heritability of 0.17–0.19.

=== Race-related ===
==== Distance ====
In South America, race distance was found to have a statistically significant impact on the rate of catastrophic injuries in one of four racecourses studied, with an odds ratio of 1.09 per additional 100 meters of distance.

The EID reports distances in categories of under 6 furlongs, 6–8 furlongs, and over 8 furlongs. Shorter races have a higher incidence of fatalities than longer races.

2009–2024 EID statistics
Distance	Starts	Fatalities	per 1000 starts
<6 furlongs	1,202,215	2,236	1.86
6–8 furlongs	2,861,070	4,637	1.62
6-8 furlongs	889,217	1,337	1.50

==== Class ====
Overall, higher class races (defined as allowance, stakes, or handicaps) have a higher incidence of catastrophic injuries than do lower class races (defined as maiden and non-stakes races), with an overall odds ratio of 1.52. This does vary by study and country, including odds ratios of 1.30–2.18 in Australia and 1.08–1.77 in the United States.

At two racetracks in South America, the fatality rate in stakes races was found to be 0.57/1000 starts versus 0.66/1000 starts in other races. However, this differed significantly by track. One track had a stakes fatality rate of 0.12/1000 starts, including 0 fatalities in 4,977 starts in group races, and a fatality rate of 0.73 in other races. The other track had a fatality rate of 1.42/1000 starts in stakes races versus a fatality rate of 0.54 in other races.

The Thoroughbred Owners and Breeders Association (TOBA) statistics on racing related career ending injuries show that high grade races have a much lower rate of injury than low grade races. While this could be attributed to many factors, including the quality of the horse, economics, or medications, the trainer still must make the decision to run a horse or not to run a horse. Because leading trainers consistently get the best horses, injury rates by race grade should correspond to injury rates by trainer. High grade races are considered stakes, allowance, and maiden special weight races. Low grade races are considered claiming and maiden claiming races.

Race grade	Career ending injury rate	Career ending injuries	Starts
High	2.27	553	243,854
Low	4.11	2,566	624,265

==== Number of starters ====
In South America, the number of starters in a race was found to be statistically significant in association with the risk of catastrophic injury for two of four tracks studied, with odds ratios of 1.13 and 1.07 per additional starter.

Some studies have found a larger number of starts to be associated with injuries, and others have not.

=== Management-related ===
==== Training and exercise history ====
Catastrophic injuries are often the acute manifestation of a more chronic process. Tissues with the greatest blood supply respond most quickly to conditioning. The first tissues to respond are the horse's heart and lungs, then its muscles, and last are tendons and bones. The heart, lungs and muscles possess an excellent blood supply. Ligaments, tendons and joint capsules are relatively poorly supplied with blood and strengthening them can take two to four times as long. Bones and hooves require the longest period of time to develop their full density and strength. A British study showed that 78% of fractures occur during training. The substantial proportion of fractures that occurred during training emphasised the importance of studying these injuries away from the racecourse and the large number of stress injuries suggested that training regimes for young Thoroughbreds could be improved to create a more robust skeleton, able to withstand injury and fatality.

==== Medication ====
Dan Hartman, Chair of Racing Commissioners International (RCI), stated in March 2011 that a five-year phase out of drugs and medication was reasonable to bring North American racing policies in line with developments in other parts of the world such as Europe and Hong Kong. Hartman stated that a phased approach would give horsemen and owners sufficient time to adjust to the change, and that regulators were the only voice in North American racing for the horse. RCI was originally called National Association of State Racing Commissioners and consists of mainly North American regulators whose goal is uniform rules and practices and reciprocity in enforcing each member's official rulings. Feeling no pain, an injured horse on drugs may continue to charge down the track, endangering every horse and jockey in the race. Drugs may account for the fact that the North American fatality rate on turf is higher than it is in Australia on turf, or even Great Britain (0.38), where race day medications are not allowed.

Country	Fatal injury rate	Fatal injuries	Starts
Australia	0.44	316	719,695
USA	1.74	134†	77,003†

In Argentina, a study found that horses that were administered phenylbutazone, an NSAID, were at higher risk of both musculoskeletal injury (odds ratio of 1.45) and fatality (odds ratio of 1.59).

=== Track-related ===
Michael Peterson of the University of Maine states there are three components that affect a racetrack's performance as it relates to injuries: the surface of the track, weather and maintenance.

==== Surface ====
In Thoroughbred racing there are three main track surfaces: dirt, turf and synthetic.

Dirt tracks are generally a mixture of sand, silt and clay. Japan Racing Association tracks use 7–8 cm of river sand cushion over a hard substrate, and New York Racing Association tracks use 10–12 cm of a sandy loam cushion over 25–27 cm of a clay/silt/sand base layer.

Turf tracks are usually Bermuda grass in warm climates and a mixture of Fescue, Bluegrass and Rye in more temperate climates. Japan Racing Association tracks use 10–12 cm of Japanese lawn grass over 30–50 cm of sandy soil, and New York Racing Association tracks use 12–14 cm of tall fescue or Kentucky bluegrass over 25 cm of sandy soil.

Synthetic tracks are generally a mixture of sand, synthetic fibers, rubber and wax. Synthetics are differentiated by brand names such as Polytrack, Tapeta Footings and Cushion Track.

North American racing is run on all three types of tracks. The EID was finally able to provide statistics on racing related fatalities in March 2010. Yearly reports have continued to be published since then. The TOBA released statistics on racing related career ending injuries three months later in June. Not included in EID or TOBA statistics are training or non-race injuries. Overall, synthetic tracks have the lowest fatality rate and dirt tracks have the highest fatality rate, with turf tracks being intermediate.

2009–2024 EID statistics
Surface	Starts	Fatalities	per 1000 starts
Dirt	3,595,056	6,498	1.81
Turf	818,116	1,122	1.37
Synthetic	538,340	590	1.10
Total	4,951,512	8,211	1.66

2008–2009 TOBA statistics
Surface	Career-ending injury rate	Career-ending injuries	Starts
Dirt	3.99	2,711	680,093
Turf	2.37	239	100,796
Synthetic	2.19	247	112,718
Totals	3.58	3,197	893,607

In the United Kingdom, the opposite relationship has been found between turf and synthetic surfaces, with turf surfaces having a lower injury and fatality rate compared to synthetic ones. The same trend is found in Hong Kong.

2000–2013 United Kingdom statistics
Surface	Starts	Fatalities	per 1000 starts
Turf	548,571	377	0.69
All-weather	258,193	233	0.90

2004−2011 Hong Kong statistics
Surface	Starts	Catastrophic fractures	per 1000 starts
Happy Valley Turf	21,386	10	0.47
Sha Tin Turf	36,382	23	0.63
Sha Tin All-weather	7,039	6	0.85

Overall, turf racing also has a lower rate of fatalities compared to dirt racing in South America, although this does vary by individual racecourse.

2005−2015 South American statistics
Track	Surface	Starts	Fatalities	per 1000 starts
"B"	Dirt	45,065	28	0.62
"B"	Turf	31,992	21	0.66
"C"	Dirt	97,767	58	0.59
"C"	Turf	4,201	1	0.24
"D"	Dirt	104,228	86	0.83
"D"	Turf	77,096	41	0.53
Total	Dirt	247,060	172	0.70
Total	Turf	113,289	63	0.56

==== Weather ====
For both dirt and turf surfaces there is a need to understand the relationship between the water content and the surface performance. For these surfaces moisture is the single most important variable in the maintenance of the surface. As synthetic surfaces wear it is also likely that the sensitivity to moisture will increase as the wax coating is lost from the surface.

The TOBA statistics on racing related career ending injuries show that moisture has the opposite effect on dirt and turf tracks. Moisture causes more injuries on dirt tracks, while it reduces injuries on turf tracks. This table does not include data from tracks rated "Good" because that term applies to both dirt and turf.

2008–2009 TOBA statistics
Surface	Condition	Career-ending injury rate	Career-ending injuries	Starts
Dirt	Dry	3.63	2,415	664,944
Dirt	Wet	4.42	399	90,324
Turf	Dry	2.48	203	81,969
Turf	Wet	1.80	11	6,098

Muddy and/or sloppy dirt tracks have a higher incidence of catastrophic musculoskeletal injury compared to fast dirt tracks. Faster turf tracks have a higher risk of fatal and non-fatal fractures and musculoskeletal injuries.

Moisture can cause even bigger problems when combined with freezing temperatures. At Philadelphia Park Racetrack in Bensalem, a rash of breakdowns in the first two months of 2004 was blamed on the winter weather and track problems caused by thawing frost; during this short stretch of time, 12 horses were euthanized following races, and another one was destroyed after sustaining a training injury. The TOBA statistics on racing related career ending injuries show that cold weather racing causes almost twice as many injuries as warm weather racing (February's rate of 3.16 is 1.67 times larger than July's rate of 1.90). The graph is a plot of injury rates for different tracks based on when their racing seasons begin and end during the calendar year. To eliminate as many conflicting variables as possible, only North American tracks in temperate climates that race on dirt/turf and that run graded stakes races were used. The tracks were Aqueduct, Belmont, Churchill Downs, Colonial Downs, Hawthorne, Laurel Park, Monmouth, and Saratoga.

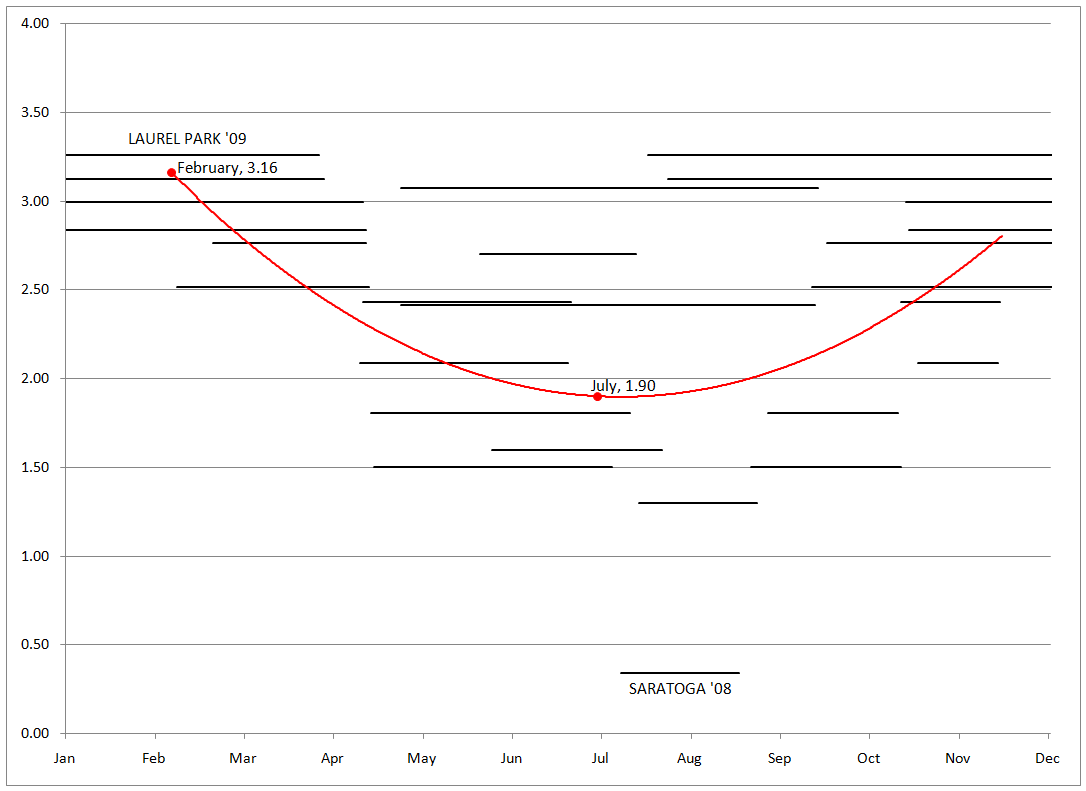
Career Ending Injury Rates from 2008–2009 for major temperate climate racetracks.

Without better data, it is difficult to determine the effect moisture and freezing temperatures have on synthetic tracks. Golden Gate Fields has a relatively high career-ending injury rate for a synthetic track and their racing season takes place during winter months, but the coldest temperatures average about 50 °F (10 °C) in that part of California during that time of year. In Great Britain the fatal injury rate on turf is less than it is on synthetics, which is opposite of North American racing. Freezing temperatures could be the reason because winter racing on the flat only takes place on synthetic tracks in Great Britain. That could result in an increase of the fatality rate on synthetics, but not turf. This anecdotal evidence seems to indicate that synthetic tracks are negatively affected by moisture and freezing temperatures just like dirt and turf.

==== Maintenance ====
Current evidence indicates that consistency of each surface and limited variability among surfaces seen by each horse are more important than the exact values of each property. Consistency allows for the horse to adapt through training. Weather and the amount of traffic on a track make consistent surfaces difficult. One of the biggest challenges with a dirt track is that a dirt track can be designed for a particular moisture content, but not for all moisture contents. In the case of synthetic tracks, wax and polymers used in them will change over time, as will the length of the fibers as they break down from use. The sand in various areas of the track also wears differently. The oils in synthetic tracks also tend to seep into the base of the surface over time, which may explain why some synthetic tracks have not performed as well in their third or fourth years as they did in their first years. The Racing Surfaces Testing Laboratory is working to collect data from racetracks and correlate it with injury rates. Such information will allow track maintenance personnel to make the best decisions for any variable.
