= Winter's Tale (horse) =

American-bred Thoroughbred racehorse

- Sire: Arts and Letters
- Grandsire: Ribot
- Dam: Christmas Wind
- Damsire: Nearctic
- Sex: Gelding
- Foaled: 1976
- Country: United States
- Colour: Bay
- Owner: Rokeby Stables
- Trainer: MacKenzie Miller
- Record: 29: 14-7-1
- Earnings: US$888,900

Major wins
- Nassau County Handicap (1980, 1983); Brooklyn Handicap (1980); Marlboro Cup (1980); Suburban Handicap (1980, 1983)

Winter's Tale (1976–2002) was an American Thoroughbred racehorse.

== Background ==
Winter's Tale was bred by owner Paul Mellon. His sire was U.S. Racing Hall of Fame inductee Arts and Letters, a son of a European superstar, the undefeated runner and British Champion sire Ribot. His dam, Christmas Wind, was a Canadian daughter of E. P. Taylor's sire Nearctic, the sire of Northern Dancer. He was conditioned for racing by Hall of Fame trainer MacKenzie Miller,

== Racing career ==
Winter's Tale began racing at age three in 1979 and, because he was a gelding, continued to race through age seven. In 1980, he won many of the top dirt races for older horses in the pre-Breeders' Cup era. At Belmont Park, he began a three-race win streak with a record seven and three-quarter length victory in the June 15 Nassau County Handicap. Then, in what the New York Times headlined as a "Most Perfect Ride", jockey Jeffrey Fell rode Winter's Tale to victory in the July 4, 1980, Suburban Handicap, also at Belmont. He then won the July 19th Brooklyn Handicap and although he suffered shin problems, in September Winter's Tale earned his eighth win from eleven career starts with a victory in the Marlboro Cup at Belmont Park.

In 1983, at age seven, Winter's Tale won his second Nassau County Handicap and his second Suburban Handicap.

== Retirement ==
Winter's Tale was retired from racing to Paul Mellon's farm in Virginia, where he died in 2002 at age twenty-six.
