= Ruffian Stakes =

- Class: Grade II
- Location: Belmont Park; New York, United States
- Inaugurated: 1976
- Race type: Thoroughbred – Flat racing
- Website: NYRA

Race information
- Distance: 1 mile
- Surface: Dirt
- Track: Left-handed
- Qualification: Fillies & Mares, four-years-old and older
- Weight: 124 lbs with allowances
- Purse: $200,000 (2021)

The Ruffian Stakes is a Grade II American thoroughbred horse race for fillies and mares ages four-years-old and older run over a distance of one mile on a dirt track scheduled annually in early May at Belmont Park in Elmont, New York.

== Race history ==
The race is named in honor of the U.S. Racing Hall of Fame filly, Ruffian who broke down in a match race with the 1975 Kentucky Derby winner Foolish Pleasure on 6 July 1975 at Belmont Park and was humanely euthanized the following day.

The following year the New York Racing Association scheduled the inaugural running of the Ruffian Stakes on 9 October 1976 as a 1 1/4 miles race for fillies and mares, three-year-old and older. The event was won by Revidere who defeated the Argentine bred Bastonera II by 14 lengths on a sloppy track in a time of 2:01 flat. Revidere was sired by Reviewer the same sire of the ill-fated Ruffian. After the first running the event was classified as Grade I.

In 1977 the distance of the event was decreased to 1 1/8 miles and the conditions of the event were changed to a handicap thus the name of the event became the Ruffian Handicap. In 1990 the distance was reduced once again to 1 1/16 miles.

The 2001 running of the Ruffian Handicap was cancelled due to the September 11th terrorist attacks.

In 2010 and 2011 the event was moved to the Saratoga Race Course in Saratoga Springs, New York during the regular summer meeting and was run as the Ruffian Invitational Handicap over a distance of 1 1/8 miles.

In late 2011 the American Graded Stakes Committee of the Thoroughbred Owners and Breeders Association downgraded the event to Grade II for 2012 however, NYRA did not schedule the event.

The event was moved to Aqueduct Racecourse in 2013 and held in April over a distance of one mile and then returned to Belmont Park in 2014 and scheduled in May where it was run on the undercard of the Man o' War Stakes on Mother's Day. That year the event became the Ruffian Stakes again in 2014 and the conditions were changed to the current format of fillies and mares ages four-years-old and older allowed to enter. Fiftyshadesofhay won the race, giving John Velazquez his sixth win in the race, currently the leading jockey to have won this event.

Outstanding mares to have won this event include Sky Beauty who won this race in 1994 with 130 pounds, Bayakoa who won the event in 1989, and Lady's Secret who won it twice, in 1985 and 1986, after which she was awarded the Eclipse Award for U.S. Horse of the Year. Genuine Risk, the second filly to win the Kentucky Derby, won it in 1980.

The 2020 winner Monomoy Girl would go on and win the Breeders' Cup Distaff at Keeneland and would be crowned U.S. Champion Older Female Horse.

In 2024 the event was moved to Aqueduct Racetrack due to infield tunnel and redevelopment work at Belmont Park.

== Records ==
Speed record:

- 1 mile – 1:34.05 Cavorting (2016)
- 1 1/16 miles – 1:40.16 Tough Tiz's Sis (2008)
- 1 1/8 miles – 1:46.80 Lady's Secret (1986)

Margins:

- 14 lengths – Revidere (1976)
- 12 1/4 lengths – Tough Tiz's Sis (2008)

Most wins:

- 2 – Lady's Secret (1985, 1986)

Most wins by a jockey:

- 6 – John Velazquez (1996, 2004, 2006, 2010, 2013, 2014)

Most wins by a trainer:

- 3 – Claude R. McGaughey III (1991, 1992, 1995)
- 3 – Robert J. Frankel (2003, 2004, 2007)

Most wins by an owner:

- 2 – Cynthia Phipps (1982, 1992)
- 2 – Eugene V. Klein (1985, 1986)
- 2 – Karl Watson & Paul Weitman (2008, 2014)
- 2 – Godolphin Racing (2005, 2015)

== Winners ==
| Year | Winner | Age | Jockey | Trainer | Owner | Distance | Time | Purse | Grade | Ref |
|---|---|---|---|---|---|---|---|---|---|---|
At Aqueduct - Ruffian Stakes
| 2026 | Irish Maxima | 5 | Frankie Pennington | John C. Servis | Irish Three Racing | 1 mile | 1:36.51 | $200,000 | II | |
| 2025 | Jody's Pride | 4 | Joel Rosario | Jorge R. Abreu | Parkland Thoroughbreds & Sportsmen Stable | 1 mile | 1:35.04 | $200,000 | II | |
| 2024 | Soul of an Angel | 5 | Trevor McCarthy | Saffie Joseph Jr. | C Two Racing Stable & Agave Racing Stable | 1 mile | 1:35.40 | $200,000 | II | |
At Belmont Park
| 2023 | Pass the Champagne | 5 | Feargal Lynch | George Weaver | R.A. Hill Stable, Black Type Thor., Rock Ridge Racing, BlackRidge Stables & James F. Brown | 1 mile | 1:36.13 | $200,000 | II | |
| 2022 | Search Results | 4 | Irad Ortiz Jr. | Chad C. Brown | Klaravich Stables | 1 mile | 1:34.88 | $200,000 | II | |
| 2021 | Vault | 5 | Joel Rosario | Brad H. Cox | Kueber Racing, Barlar, Madaket Stables & Little Red Feather Racing | 1 mile | 1:35.81 | $200,000 | II | |
| 2020 | Monomoy Girl | 5 | Florent Geroux | Brad H. Cox | Michael Dubb, Monomoy Stables, The Elkstone Group and Bethlehem Stables | 1 mile | 1:34.13 | $145,500 | II | |
| 2019 | Come Dancing | 5 | Manuel Franco | Carlos F. Martin | Blue Devil Racing Stable | 1 mile | 1:36.54 | $242,500 | II | |
| 2018 | Pacific Wind | 4 | Irad Ortiz Jr. | Chad C. Brown | Sharon Alesia, Ciaglia Racing, Peter M. Brant & Dominic Savides | 1 mile | 1:39.05 | $245,000 | II | |
| 2017 | Highway Star | 4 | Angel S. Arroyo | Rodrigo A. Ubillo | Chester & Mary Broman | 1 mile | 1:39.05 | $245,000 | II | |
| 2016 | Cavorting | 4 | Javier Castellano | Kiaran P. McLaughlin | Stonestreet Stables | 1 mile | 1:34.05 | $250,000 | II | |
| 2015 | § Wedding Toast | 5 | Jose Lezcano | Kiaran P. McLaughlin | Godolphin Racing | 1 mile | 1.35.57 | $250,000 | II | |
| 2014 | Fiftyshadesofhay | 4 | John R. Velazquez | Bob Baffert | Karl Watson, Michael E. Pegram & Paul Weitman | 1 mile | 1:35.70 | $250,000 | II | |
At Aqueduct – Ruffian Handicap
| 2013 | Withgreatpleasure | 5 | John R. Velazquez | David Nunn | David Blethen | 1 mile | 1:36.52 | $250,000 | II | |
| 2012 | Race not held | | | | | | | | | |
At Saratoga – Ruffian Invitational Handicap
| 2011 | Ask the Moon | 6 | Javier Castellano | Martin D. Wolfson | Farnsworth Stable | 1 1/8 miles | 1:50.46 | $250,000 | I | |
| 2010 | Malibu Prayer | 4 | John R. Velazquez | Todd A. Pletcher | Edward P. Evans | 1 1/8 miles | 1:48.14 | $250,000 | I | |
At Belmont Park – Ruffian Handicap
| 2009 | Swift Temper | 5 | Alan Garcia | Dale L. Romans | Richard Nip & Omar Trevino | 1 1/16 miles | 1:40.59 | $300,000 | I | |
| 2008 | Tough Tiz's Sis | 4 | Edgar S. Prado | Bob Baffert | Karl Watson & Weitman Performance | 1 1/16 miles | 1:40.16 | $300,000 | I | |
| 2007 | Ginger Punch | 4 | Rafael Bejarano | Robert J. Frankel | Stronach Stables | 1 1/16 miles | 1:40.25 | $285,000 | I | |
| 2006 | Pool Land | 4 | John R. Velazquez | Todd A. Pletcher | Melnyk Racing Stable | 1 1/16 miles | 1:41.81 | $294,000 | I | |
| 2005 | Stellar Jayne | 4 | Jerry D. Bailey | Saeed bin Suroor | Godolphin Racing | 1 1/16 miles | 1:41.87 | $300,000 | I | |
| 2004 | Sightseek | 5 | John R. Velazquez | Robert J. Frankel | Juddmonte Farms | 1 1/16 miles | 1:41.51 | $294,000 | I | |
| 2003 | Wild Spirit (CHI) | 4 | Jerry D. Bailey | Robert J. Frankel | Sumaya Us Stable | 1 1/16 miles | 1:41.23 | $300,000 | I | |
| 2002 | Mandy's Gold | 4 | Jose A. Santos | Michael E. Gorham | Steeplechase Farm | 1 1/16 miles | 1:42.57 | $300,000 | I | |
| 2001 | Race not held | | | | | | | | | |
| 2000 | Riboletta (BRZ) | 5 | Chris McCarron | Eduardo Inda | Aaron U. & Marie D. Jones | 1 1/16 miles | 1:40.35 | $250,000 | I | |
| 1999 | Catinca | 4 | Jerry D. Bailey | John C. Kimmel | Robert K. Waxman | 1 1/16 miles | 1:41.94 | $250,000 | I | |
| 1998 | Sharp Cat | 4 | Corey Nakatani | Wallace Dollase | The Thoroughbred Corporation | 1 1/16 miles | 1:42.40 | $250,000 | I | |
| 1997 | Tomisue's Delight | 3 | Jerry D. Bailey | Neil J. Howard | Stephen C. Hilbert | 1 1/16 miles | 1:44.43 | $250,000 | I | |
| 1996 | Yanks Music | 3 | John R. Velazquez | Leo O'Brien | Michael Fennessy | 1 1/16 miles | 1:41.84 | $250,000 | I | |
| 1995 | Inside Information | 4 | Mike E. Smith | Claude R. McGaughey III | Ogden Mills Phipps | 1 1/16 miles | 1:40.98 | $200,000 | I | |
| 1994 | Sky Beauty | 4 | Mike E. Smith | H. Allen Jerkens | Georgia E. Hofmann | 1 1/16 miles | 1:41.79 | $200,000 | I | |
| 1993 | Shared Interest | 5 | Robbie Davis | Flint S. Schulhofer | Robert S. Evans | 1 1/16 miles | 1:41.92 | $200,000 | I | |
| 1992 | Versailles Treaty | 5 | Mike E. Smith | Claude R. McGaughey III | Cynthia Phipps | 1 1/16 miles | 1:41.41 | $200,000 | I | |
| 1991 | Queena | 5 | Angel Cordero Jr. | Claude R. McGaughey III | Emory A. Hamilton | 1 1/16 miles | 1:41.65 | $200,000 | I | |
| 1990 | Quick Mischief | 4 | Raul I. Rojas | Charles J. Carlesimo Jr. | Gregory Mordas | 1 1/16 miles | 1:42.80 | $240,840 | I | |
| 1989 | Bayakoa (ARG) | 5 | Laffit Pincay Jr. | Ron McAnally | Janis & Frank Whitham | 1 1/8 miles | 1:48.40 | $226,400 | I | |
| 1988 | Sham Say | 3 | Jacinto Vasquez | William B. Cox | Evergreen Farm | 1 1/8 miles | 1:48.00 | $244,000 | I | |
| 1987 | †§ Coup de Fusil | 5 | Angel Cordero Jr. | Jan H. Nerud | Tartan Farms | 1 1/8 miles | 1:48.60 | $249,600 | I | |
| 1986 | Lady's Secret | 4 | Pat Day | D. Wayne Lukas | Eugene V. Klein | 1 1/8 miles | 1:46.80 | $230,400 | I | |
| 1985 | § Lady's Secret | 3 | Jorge Velasquez | D. Wayne Lukas | Eugene V. Klein | 1 1/8 miles | 1:47.40 | $169,800 | I | |
| 1984 | Heatherten | 5 | Randy Romero | William I. Mott | John A. Franks | 1 1/8 miles | 1:48.20 | $172,200 | I | |
| 1983 | Heartlight No. One | 3 | Laffit Pincay Jr. | Pedro Marti | Burt Bacharach | 1 1/8 miles | 1:47.20 | $171,925 | I | |
| 1982 | Christmas Past | 3 | Jacinto Vasquez | Angel A. Penna Jr. | Cynthia Phipps | 1 1/8 miles | 1:48.60 | $166,800 | I | |
| 1981 | Relaxing | 5 | Angel Cordero Jr. | Angel Penna Sr. | Ogden Phipps | 1 1/8 miles | 1:47.60 | $161,700 | I | |
| 1980 | Genuine Risk | 3 | Jacinto Vasquez | LeRoy Jolley | Diana M. Firestone | 1 1/8 miles | 1:49.20 | $136,500 | I | |
| 1979 | It's in the Air | 3 | Laffit Pincay Jr. | Laz Barrera | Harbor View Farm | 1 1/8 miles | 1:47.40 | $133,125 | I | |
| 1978 | Late Bloomer | 4 | Jorge Velasquez | John M. Gaver Jr. | Greentree Stable | 1 1/8 miles | 1:47.00 | $108,100 | I | |
| 1977 | Cum Laude Laurie | 3 | Angel Cordero Jr. | Thomas L. Rondinello | Daniel W. Galbreath | 1 1/8 miles | 1:52.20 | $110,300 | I | |
Ruffian Stakes
| 1976 | Revidere | 3 | Jacinto Vasquez | David A. Whiteley | William Haggin Perry | 1 1/4 miles | 2:01.00 | $132,375 | I | |

Notes:
§ Ran as an entry
† In the 1987 running Sacahuista finished first, but was disqualified for interfering with other runners in the straight. Coup De Fusil was declared the winner and Sacahuista was placed third. However, since all three placegetters were part of an entry Coup De Fusil, Clabber Girl and Sacahuista the payout for first place was $2.80 as the entry's odds were 2/5.

== See also ==
- List of American and Canadian Graded races
