= Nassau County Stakes =

- Class: Grade III
- Location: Belmont Park; Elmont, New York, United States
- Inaugurated: 1996
- Race type: Thoroughbred - Flat racing
- Website: www.nyra.com/index_belmont.html

Race information
- Distance: 7 furlongs
- Surface: Dirt
- Track: left-handed
- Qualification: Three-year-old fillies
- Weight: Assigned
- Purse: $200,000+

The Nassau County Stakes is an American Thoroughbred horse race run annually at Belmont Park in Elmont, Nassau County, New York. A Grade III event, it is open to three-year-old fillies willing to run the distance of seven furlongs on dirt. The race offers a purse $200,000 added.

Inaugurated in 1996, it is named after the county on Long Island in which Belmont Park is located.

On November 28, 2007, this Grade II stakes race was downgraded to a Grade III by the American Graded Stakes Committee.

Previously, Belmont Park hosted the Nassau County Handicap, a race on dirt for horses of either sex, age three and older. This race was last run in 1993.

== Records ==
Speed record:

- 1:22.04 - Dream Rush (2007)

Most wins by a jockey:

- 2 - Jorge Chavez (1996, 2008)
- 2 - José A. Santos (1997, 2003)
- 2 - Mike E. Smith (1998, 1999)
- 2 - Javier Castellano (2002, 2009)

Most wins by a trainer:

- No trainer has won this race more than once.

Most wins by an owner:

- No owner has won this race more than once.

== Winners ==
Year	Winner	Jockey	Trainer	Owner	Time
2010	No Race				
2009	Flashing	Javier Castellano	Thomas Albertrani	Darley Stable	1:23.59
2008	Zaftig	Jorge Chavez	James A. Jerkens	Susan Moore/M and M Thoroughbred Partners	1:22.74
2007	Dream Rush	Eibar Coa	Richard Violette, Jr.	West Point Stable	1:22.04
2006	Hello Liberty	Norberto Arroyo, Jr.	J. Larry Jones	J. Ferris, M. Riley, D. Gamble, J. L. Jones	1:22.65
2005	Seeking the Ante	Mike Luzzi	John C. Kimmel	Mary & Chester Broman	1:22.86
2004	Bending Strings	Jerry Bailey	Kiaran McLaughlin	John D. Gunther	1:22.70
2003	House Party	José A. Santos	H. Allen Jerkens	Joseph V. Shields, Jr.	1:23.28
2002	Nonsuch Bay	Javier Castellano	Frank A. Alexander	Joseph P. Platt, Jr.	1:23.90
2001	Cat Chat	John Velazquez	Alan E. Goldberg	Jayeff B Stables	1:23.02
2000	C'est L'Amour	Edgar Prado	Philip G. Johnson	Lael Stables	1:23.46
1999	Oh What a Windfall	Mike E. Smith	C. R. McGaughey III	Ogden Phipps	1:23.59
1998	Jersey Girl	Mike E. Smith	Todd A. Pletcher	Ackerley Bros. Farm	1:22.63
1997	Alyssum	José A. Santos	Flint S. Schulhofer	Alexander & Groves	1:22.90
1996	Star de Lady Ann	Jorge Chavez	William W. Perry	John D. Murphy	1:22.19

== Nassau County Handicap ==
Open to horses of either sex, age three and older, it was raced on dirt over a distance of 1 1/8 miles (9 furlongs).

In 1992, the four-year-old Strike the Gold, set a new track record of 1:46 3/5 in winning the Nassau County Handicap.

=== Winners ===
- 1993 - West By West
- 1992 - Strike the Gold
- 1991 - Festin
- 1990 - Tricky Creek
- 1989 - Forever Silver
- 1988 - Personal Flag
- 1987 - Lac Ouimet
- 1986 - Roo Art
- 1985 - Secret Prince
- 1984 - Moro
- 1983 - Winter's Tale
- 1982 - Princelet
- 1981 - Fool's Prayer
- 1980 - Winter's Tale
- 1979 - Alydar
- 1978 - Upper Nile
- 1977 - Forego
- 1976 - Forego
- 1975 - Queen City Lad
- 1974 - Timeless Moment
- 1973 - Icecapade
- 1972 - Towzie Tyke
- 1971 - Proliferation
- 1970 - Reviewer
- 1969 - Rixdal
- 1968 - Primo Richard
- 1967 - Handsome Boy
- 1966 - Pluck
- 1965 - Malicious
- 1964 - Garwol
- 1963 - Kelso
- 1962 - Beau Prince
- 1961 - Black Thumper
- 1960 - Polylad
- 1959 - Endine
- 1958 - Eddie Schmidt
- 1957 - Gallant Man
- 1956 - Admiral Vee
