= Susan Stover =

American veterinarian and academic

- Education: Washington State University; UC Davis
- Known for: "An association between complete and incomplete stress fractures of the humerus in racehorses" (1994); "Horseshoe characteristics as possible risk factors for fatal musculoskeletal injury of Thoroughbred racehorses" (1996); "Relationship between race start characteristics and risk of catastrophic injury in Thoroughbreds" (1998)
- Awards: AVMA Lifetime Excellence in Research Award; University of Kentucky Equine Research Hall of Fame
- Scientific career
- Fields: Veterinary medicine Equine anatomy Biomechanics
- Workplaces: University of California, Davis
- Thesis: Dorsal metacarpal disease in Thoroughbred horses: relationship to the development of the third metacarpal (1988)

Susan Marie Stover is a professor of veterinary anatomy at the University of California, Davis School of Veterinary Medicine and director of the J.D. Wheat Veterinary Orthopedic Research Laboratory. One of the focuses of her wide-ranging research is musculoskeletal injuries in racehorses, particularly catastrophic breakdowns. Her identification of risk factors has resulted in improved early detection and changes to horse training and surgical repair methods. On July 30, 2016, Stover received the Lifetime Excellence in Research Award from the American Veterinary Medical Association. In August 2016, she was selected for induction into the University of Kentucky Equine Research Hall of Fame.

== Education and honors ==
Stover earned her Doctor of Veterinary Medicine degree from Washington State University in 1976. She then completed an internship and residency in equine surgery at UC Davis. After working in private practice in Washington state, she returned to UC Davis where she became board certified by the American College of Veterinary Surgeons. In 1987, she earned her Ph.D. in comparative pathology, doing orthopedic research into dorsal metacarpal disease in Thoroughbred racehorses, colloquially known as "bucked shins".

In 2010, Washington State University presented Stover with the Distinguished Veterinary Alumnus Award for Excellence in Teaching and Research after two students that she mentored received James Wilson Awards for the Best Equine Publication by a resident or graduate student, in addition to her own distinguished research.

In 2013, UC Davis honored her with the 2013 Alumni Achievement Award "for her contributions to veterinary orthopedic research, particularly toward understanding musculoskeletal injuries of racing horses and improving racetrack safety."

In 2014, she received a Founders Award from the American College of Veterinary Surgeons (ACVS) in recognition of her wide-ranging orthopedic research, from studies of equine and small animal surgery, to basic bone biology, musculoskeletal diseases and human orthopedics. The ACVS also noted that she had provided clinical training to 26 ACVS residents, was a research advisor for 37 ACVS residents and was an orthopedic research supervisor of 79 graduate academic and 36 DVM students. Of her trainees, 29 went on to hold faculty positions. Colleagues stated: "I believe Dr. Sue Stover's contributions to the advancement of equine musculoskeletal health and injury prevention can only be described as monumental," and "I would consider this level of advanced training to veterinarians and ACVS residents as unparalleled." She was the first female surgeon and ninth overall to be so recognized.

In 2016, Stover received the Lifetime Excellence in Research Award from the American Veterinary Medical Association. "Throughout her distinguished career, Dr. Stover has played a pivotal role in improving our understanding of performance-related injuries in racing horses," said Dr. Joe Kinnarney, president of the AVMA. In August, the University of Kentucky announced that she had been selected for induction into their Equine Research Hall of Fame in Lexington.

In 2022, Stover delivered the Frank J. Milne State-of-the-Art Lecture at the annual American Association of Equine Practitioners conference, titled “Skeletal Injuries in Equine Athletes: Pathogenesis and Training Concepts for Injury Prevention.”

As of 2024, Stover is a professor at UC Davis School of Veterinary Medicine, teaching musculoskeletal anatomy, biomechanics, and pathology to veterinary students. She is also the Director of the J. D. Wheat Orthopedic Research Laboratory, and has over 200 research publications.

== Catastrophic racing injuries ==
Stover is known internationally for her research into equine bone development and its response to repetitive use. In 1994, she published a study on catastrophic breaks of the humerus in racehorses, showing they were most often preceded by stress fractures. She then systematically identified similar stress fractures underlying the development of most performance-related fractures in equine athletes.

Another study showed that the risk of a thoroughbred suffering a catastrophic injury was increased by a factor of 16 if the horse was wearing high toe grabs (a cleat on the front of the horseshoe designed to improve traction) on the front feet. In 2008, the graded stakes committee of the Thoroughbred Owners and Breeders Association adopted a rule that limited the allowable height of toe grabs on racetracks that hold graded stakes races.

In response to the breakdowns of Barbaro and Eight Belles in Triple Crown races, Stover was asked to testify before the House Subcommittee on Commerce, Trade and Consumer Protection on the topic "Breeding, Drugs and Breakdowns: The State of Thoroughbred Horseracing and the Welfare of the Thoroughbred" in June 2008. She stated that although the rise in breakdowns was "devastating", there were promising initial results from the switch in California to synthetic dirt surfaces. "Given time, I'm optimistic we can prevent many more injuries," she said.

Subsequent data from the Equine Injury Database showed that the synthetic surfaces were significantly safer to racehorses. For the period of January 1, 2009 through January 31, 2013:

- For synthetic tracks, the rate was 1.22 breakdowns per 1,000 starts.
- For turf courses, the rate was 1.63 per 1,000.
- For dirt surfaces, the rate was 2.08 per 1000.

Stover helped develop a "track in a box" to see how simulated hoof impacts are affected by different surfaces. Stover said, "In the laboratory, many new factors — for example, new surfaces and horseshoes — can be studied that optimize traction while reducing injury risk. Laboratory studies also control the environmental circumstances, thus avoiding the confounding of the results incurred by the multiple environmental variants in natural racetrack settings." Roughly 50% of catastrophic breakdowns involve the fetlock joint, which connects the pastern and cannon bone. When a hoof strikes a racing surface, there is some slide, which helps reduce impact forces in excess of 10,000 Newtons but increases the risk of hyperextension of the joint. If the slide is too short, fractures of the first phalanx (P1) may result. This happens most frequently on turf and may be associated with studs on the horseshoe. On the other hand, Stover said that "the more hyperextension the fetlock undergoes, the higher the stresses that are put on the structures that are failing. If we can show that certain surfaces minimize hyperextension, they should minimize catastrophic injuries."

Despite the improved safety record, several tracks (including Santa Anita, Del Mar and Keeneland) that installed synthetic surfaces in the mid-2000s had switched back to natural dirt by 2015, a change that made Stover ask, "Are we making decisions based on scientific evidence, or things we don’t know much about?" She added, "From my perspective, synthetic tracks are still safer. If we modify a surface, it affects every horse that’s training or racing, and we have the opportunity to make a difference – a big difference – to those horses."

In addition to racing surface and horseshoeing, Stover helped identify other risk factors for the development of fractures, including:

- sex – intact males are more likely to breakdown than geldings or females
- career length – the risk of breakdown is higher for horses that have spent more time in active training and that have had a long gap since their last layup
- exercise pattern – higher exercise intensities over the course of a year also present a significant risk factor

Her research has helped lead to better early detection, monitoring of at risk-horses and changes to training methods. These include:

- shoeing the horse to make sure the angle of the heel is not too low
- engaging in more frequent but shorter high speed works
- avoiding too much high speed distance activity over short periods of time
- recognizing horses with mild injuries and giving them time to recover

Studies directed by her have also led to improvements in surgical repair methods in both large and small animals. She is also involved in research regarding the association between the development of osteoporosis in horses and the inhalation of cytotoxic silicate-laden soil.

== Publications ==
Stover is the author or co-author of over 200 research publications, including:

- Stover, S. M., Johnson, B. J., Daft, B. M., Read, D. H., Anderson, M., Barr, B. C., ... Ardans, A. A. (1992). "An association between complete and incomplete stress fractures of the humerus in racehorses". Equine Veterinary Journal. 24 (4): 260–263. doi:10.1111/j.2042-3306.1992.tb02831.x. PMID 1499531.
- Johnson, B.J., Stover, S.M., Daft, B.M., (...), Woods, L., Stoltz, J. (1994). "Causes of death in racehorses over a 2 year period". Equine Veterinary Journal. 26 (4): 327–30. doi:10.1111/j.2042-3306.1994.tb04395.x. PMID 8575402.
- Kane, A.J., Stover, S.M., Gardner, I.A., (...), Read, D.H., Ardans, A.A. (1996). "Horseshoe characteristics as possible risk factors for fatal musculoskeletal injury of Thoroughbred racehorses". American Journal of Veterinary Research. 57 (8): 1147–52. doi:10.2460/ajvr.1996.57.08.1147. PMID 8836365.
- Estberg, L., Stover, S.M., Gardner, I.A., (...), Stoltz, J., Woods, L. (1998). "Relationship between race start characteristics and risk of catastrophic injury in Thoroughbreds: 78 cases". Journal of the American Veterinary Medical Association.
- Stover, Susan (2003). "The epidemiology of thoroughbred racehorse injuries". Clinical Techniques in Equine Practice. 3 (4): 312–322. doi:10.1053/j.ctep.2004.04.003.
- Stover, S. M., Murray, A. (2008). "The California Postmortem Program: leading the way". Veterinary Clinics of North America: Equine Practice. 24 (1): 21–36. doi:10.1016/j.cveq.2007.11.009. PMID 18314034.
- Pollock, S. Hull, M. L., Stover, S. M., Galuppo, L. (2008). "A Musculoskeletal Model of the Equine Forelimb for Determining Surface Stresses and Strains in the Humerus—Part I. Mathematical Modeling". Journal of Biomechanical Engineering. 130 (4): 041006. doi:10.1115/1.2898726. PMID 18601448.
- Setterbo, J., Garcia, T., Campbell, I., Reese, J., Morgan, J., Kim, S., Hubbard, M., Stover, S. M. (2009). "Hoof accelerations and ground reaction forces of Thoroughbred racehorses measured on dirt, synthetic, and turf track surfaces". American Journal of Veterinary Research. 70 (10): 1220–9. doi:10.2460/ajvr.70.10.1220. PMID 19795936.

Stover has also authored five book chapters:

- Stover, Susan (2014). "Stress Fracture Diagnosis in Racehorses". In Robinson, N. Edward; Sprayberry, Kim A. (eds.). Robinson's Current Therapy in Equine Medicine. St. Louis, MO: W B Saunders Co. pp. 879–885. ISBN 9781455745555.
- Stover, Susan (1998). "Stress Fractures". In Moore, Nathaniel A.; White, James N. (eds.). Current techniques in equine surgery and lameness. Philadelphia, Pa.: Saunders. ISBN 0721646018.
- Stover, Susan (1992). "Dorsal metacarpal disease". In Robinson, N. Edward (ed.). Current therapy in equine medicine 3 (3rd ed.). Philadelphia: Saunders. ISBN 0721634753.
- Stover, Susan (1990). "Bucked shins and stress fractures of the metacarpus in the horse". In Smith, Bradford P. (ed.). Large animal internal medicine. St. Louis: Mosby. ISBN 0801650623.
- Stover, Susan (1987). "Pre- and post-operative management of the colic patient". In Robinson, N. Edward (ed.). Current therapy in equine medicine 2. Philadelphia: Saunders. ISBN 0721614914.
