= Ruffian (horse) =

American-bred champion Thoroughbred racehorse

- Sire: Reviewer
- Grandsire: Bold Ruler
- Dam: Shenanigans
- Damsire: Native Dancer
- Sex: Filly
- Foaled: April 17, 1972; Paris, Kentucky, U.S.
- Died: July 7, 1975 (aged 3); Elmont, New York, U.S.
- Country: United States
- Colour: Dark Bay
- Breeder: Stuart & Barbara Phipps Janney
- Owner: Stuart & Barbara Phipps Janney
- Trainer: Frank Y. Whiteley Jr.
- Record: 11: 10-0-0 (1 DNF)
- Earnings: $313,428

Major wins
- Fashion Stakes (1974); Astoria Stakes (1974); Spinaway Stakes (1974); Sorority Stakes (1974); Comely Stakes (1975); Acorn Stakes (1975); Mother Goose Stakes (1975); Coaching Club American Oaks (1975)

Awards
- American Champion Two-Year-Old Filly (1974); 4th U.S. Triple Tiara Champion (1975); American Champion Three-Year-Old Filly (1975)

Honours
- American Racing Hall of Fame (1976) #35 – Top 100 American Racehorses of the 20th Century; Top Ranked American Female Racehorse of the 20th Century; Ruffian Stakes at Belmont Park; TV film: Ruffian (2007)
- Last updated on September 21, 2021

Ruffian (April 17, 1972 – July 7, 1975) was an American Thoroughbred racehorse who won ten consecutive races, including the Acorn, Mother Goose and Coaching Club American Oaks, then known as the American Triple Tiara. She was in the lead at every point of call in every race she ever ran and set new stakes records in each of the eight stakes races she won. Her dominating wins resulted in her being voted the American Champion filly at both ages two and three. In July 1975, she entered a highly anticipated match race with Kentucky Derby winner Foolish Pleasure, in which she broke down with two broken bones in her right foreleg. Surgery was attempted but Ruffian reacted poorly and exacerbated the injuries while coming out of anesthesia. As a result, she had to be euthanized.

Ruffian was inducted into the National Museum of Racing and Hall of Fame in 1976. The Blood-Horse magazine ranked her as the top filly or mare of the twentieth century in their list of the top 100 American racehorses of the 20th century, and number 35 overall. Her story was told in the 2007 film Ruffian and numerous books.

== Background ==
Ruffian was foaled on April 17, 1972, at Claiborne Farm near Paris, Kentucky. She was bred by Stuart S. Janney Jr. and Barbara Phipps Janney, owners of Locust Hill Farm in Glyndon, Maryland. Barbara Janney was a cousin of prominent horseman Ogden Mills Phipps. Ruffian was sired by Reviewer, a son of the Phipps family's great sire Bold Ruler, and out of the Native Dancer mare Shenanigans. She was trained by Frank Y. Whiteley Jr.

Ruffian was a dark bay filly, often described as black or near-black. She stood 16.2 hands (66 inches, 168 cm) high, then considered quite large for a filly. Sportswriter Joe Hirsch called her the most imposing juvenile filly he'd ever seen. William Nack, author of Ruffian: A Racetrack Romance, wrote, "She looked like an outside linebacker." Ruffian used her early speed, size and strength to intimidate competition.

== Racing career ==
=== Two-year-old season ===
Ruffian made her debut at Belmont Park on May 22, 1974, in a 5 1/2-furlong maiden special weight race, going off at odds of 4–1 in a field of ten. Breaking from post position nine, she went straight to the front while running the first quarter-mile in 22 1/5 seconds. She continued to open up her lead while rounding the turn, completing the half-mile in 45 seconds flat. She eventually won by 15 lengths and tied the track record in a time of 1:03 flat.

On June 12, Ruffian faced stiffer company in the 5 1/2-furlong Fashion Stakes, including two other undefeated fillies, Copernica and Jan Verzel. Despite the step up in class, Ruffian went off as the 2-5 favorite based on her earlier win. She again went to the lead with an opening quarter of 22 1/5 seconds with Copernica 1 1/2 lengths back. The margin remained the same through the half mile, run in 0:45 1/5, but Ruffian started to open up in the stretch. The final margin was 6 3/4 lengths to Copernica, with Jan Verzel a further 13 lengths back in third. Ruffian equaled her own track record of 1:03.

Ruffian made her third start on July 10 at Aqueduct Racetrack in the Astoria Stakes over a distance of 5 1/2 furlongs. Facing only three rivals, she went off as the 1-10 favorite with no show betting allowed. She established an early lead while running the first quarter in 0:21 4/5. Despite being eased in the final strides, she won by nine lengths in a time of 1:02 4/5, setting a new stakes record. She was just one-fifth of a second off the track record set by Raise A Native.

Her next start at Monmouth Park on July 27 in the Grade I Sorority Stakes would prove a greater challenge as she faced another top class filly called Hot n Nasty who, like Ruffian, had already earned multiple stakes wins. Ruffian went off as the 3-10 favorite with Hot n Nasty at 2–1. Ruffian broke a step slow but soon took the early lead, setting a "brutally fast" pace of 0:21 3/5 for the first quarter and 0:44 1/5 for the half. Hot n Nasty stayed in touch though and actually got a head in front near the top of the stretch. For the first time, jockey Jacinto Vásquez hit Ruffian with the whip. Ruffian responded by inching back into the lead, then finally drew away to win in a stakes record time of 1:09 for six furlongs. Hot n Nasty was 2 1/2 lengths back in second and the third place horse was 22 lengths behind.

The day after the race, Ruffian came down with a heavy cough. Vásquez also believed she had popped a splint in the race, which, although not a serious injury, was painful enough to take the edge off of most horses.

On August 23 at Saratoga Race Course, Ruffian entered the Spinaway Stakes at a distance of six furlongs. Going off at odds of 1–5 in a field of four, she was never challenged in a gate-to-wire win of 12 3/4 lengths. Her time of 1:08 3/5 broke the stakes record that had been set at Belmont Park in 1945 on the old Widener straight course. Secretariat's trainer, Lucien Laurin, said after the race that "[Ruffian] may be better than Secretariat". Another trainer said that she could have won either division of that year's Hopeful Stakes by twenty lengths. It was the fastest time ever run by a two-year-old, colt or filly, at Saratoga.

Ruffian was entered in the Frizette Stakes on September 26 but was scratched on the day of the race due to a high temperature. Whiteley then considered running her against colts in the Champagne Stakes but she went off her feed and ran another fever. Veterinarian James Prendergast detected a hairline fracture of her right hind ankle, ruling her out for the rest of the year. Whiteley was later interviewed about the fracture and asked if it were true that it happened during the Spinaway. He answered, "It did happen during the race, she was just a couple of strides from the wire." When asked why he thought Ruffian had not shown any signs of being hurt until later, he replied, "She is a very tough filly, and doesn't like to show any weaknesses."

Ruffian missed the rest of the two-year-old season but her five wins were sufficient to earn her the Eclipse Award for American Champion Two-Year-Old Filly. Ruffian was also voted the 2-year-old "Horse of the Year" by Turf & Sport Digest as well as the 1974 "Filly 2-year-old Champion".

=== Three-year-old season ===
Ruffian started her three-year-old campaign on April 14 in a six-furlong allowance race at Aqueduct. Despite the long layoff, she was the prohibitive 1-10 favorite in a field of five. She took the lead after a few strides, then ran the opening quarter-mile in 23 seconds flat and the half in 0:45 4/5. She won by 4 3/4 lengths in a time of 1:09 2/5.

She followed up with a victory in the Comely Stakes at Aqueduct on April 30, winning despite a poor start by 7 3/4 lengths. Her time of 1:21 1/5 for 7 furlongs set a new stakes record and was just a second off Dr. Fager's track record. Going off at odds of 1-20 (the legal minimum), she created a minus pool of $36,064.

Ruffian was then targeted at the so-called Triple Tiara, the filly equivalent of the American Triple Crown. At the time, the series consisted of the Acorn Stakes, Mother Goose Stakes and Coaching Club American Oaks. In the Acorn Stakes on May 10 at Aqueduct, Ruffian was the 1-10 favorite. She was expected to face eight other fillies, but her two main rivals scratched before the race. Ruffian quickly went to the lead and won by 8 1/2 lengths in a stakes record time of 1:34 2/5 for one mile. "What can you say?" asked Vásquez. "She's just great and runs so easy. She had no competition."

On May 31, Ruffian entered the Mother Goose Stakes at Aqueduct as the 1-10 favorite in a field of seven. The start was marred when the filly to Ruffian's right, Dan's Commander, threw her rider. Ruffian was not disturbed and took the lead, running the first quarter-mile in a relatively slow 0:24 1/5. Running at her own pace, she completed the half in 0:47 3/5 while leading by 1 1/2 lengths then completed three-quarters in 1:11 3/5 with a two-length lead. Turning into the stretch, she started to draw away and eventually won by 13 1/2 lengths while setting a new stakes record of 1:47 4/5 for nine furlongs. "I didn't do anything but ride", said Vásquez.

In the Coaching Club American Oaks on June 21 at Belmont Park, she was again made the 1-10 favorite despite racing for the first time at a distance of 1 1/2 miles. She opened up a 6-length lead on the backstretch but the field closed on her during the far turn, getting as close as 1 length. In the stretch, Ruffian again pulled away to win by 2 3/4 lengths over Equal Change, with the third place horse a further nine lengths back. Her time of 2:27 4/5 tied the stakes record.

Ruffian was undefeated in her first ten races, covering distances from 5.5 furlongs (1.1 km) to 1.5 miles (2.4 km), with an average winning margin of 8 1/3 lengths. She set stakes records in each stakes race she entered.

==== Final race and death ====
Ruffian's eleventh race was run at Belmont Park on July 6, 1975. It was a match race between her and that year's Kentucky Derby winner, Foolish Pleasure. Her connections had been asked about running her against colts since early in her career, and Whiteley thought that the Travers Stakes at Saratoga in August would be a good opportunity. "Prove the point one time and that'll be it," he had said in May. "I don't want to put too much pressure on her." However, Janney felt obligated to enter Ruffian in the July match race due to media and public expectations. He told Whiteley that such a race was inevitable and it would be best to do so on her home track. In the past, the horses had shared the same jockey: Jacinto Vásquez. He chose to ride Ruffian in the match race, believing her to be the better of the horses; Braulio Baeza rode Foolish Pleasure. The "Great Match" was heavily anticipated and attended by more than 50,000 spectators, with an estimated television audience of 20 million.

As Ruffian left the starting gate, she hit her shoulder hard before straightening herself. The first quarter-mile (402 m) was run in 22 1/5 seconds, with Ruffian ahead by a nose. Little more than 1 furlong (201 m) later, Ruffian was in front by half a length when she changed leads, followed by a crack audible to both jockeys. Both of the sesamoid bones in her right foreleg had snapped. Vásquez tried to pull her up, but the filly would not stop. She went on running, pulverizing her sesamoids, ripping the skin off her fetlock and tearing her ligaments until her hoof was flopping uselessly. Vásquez said it was impossible for him to stop her. She still tried to run and finish the race. Video showed Ruffian was startled by a bird in the infield and took a bad step.

Ruffian was immediately attended to by a team of four veterinarians and an orthopedic surgeon, and underwent an emergency operation lasting twelve hours, during which she had to be revived twice after she stopped breathing. When the anesthesia wore off after the surgery, she thrashed about wildly on the floor of a padded recovery stall as if still running in the race. Despite the efforts of numerous attendants, she began spinning in circles on the floor. As she flailed about with her legs, she repeatedly knocked the heavy plaster cast against her own elbow until the elbow, too, was smashed to bits. The vet who treated her said that her elbow was shattered and looked like a piece of ice after being smashed on the ground. The cast slipped, and as it became dislodged it ripped open her foreleg all over again, undoing the surgery. The medical team, knowing that Ruffian would probably not survive more extensive surgery for the repair of her leg and elbow (much less the long period of stall rest required after surgery), euthanized her shortly afterward, at 2:25 a.m. on July 7.

"It was unfortunate we were in a learning period at the time," said her surgeon, Dr. Edward Keefer, in 2000. "Vets are really doing a hell of a job now and have improved tremendously in their knowledge and how to handle these catastrophic occurrences."

==== Burial ====
Ruffian's relocated gravesite at Claiborne Farm.

At around 9 p.m. on July 7, 1975, after the day's races concluded at Belmont Park, Ruffian's remains were buried in a private ceremony in the infield. Her nose was pointed towards the finish line.

In August 2023 it was announced that Ruffian's remains were exhumed from her grave at Belmont Park and reinterred in Marchmont Cemetery at Claiborne Farm in Kentucky where she was born. The decision was made by Stuart Janney III (the son of Ruffian's owners) after consultation with the New York Racing Association and Claiborne, as Ruffian's grave was located directly on the footprint of where Belmont was in the process of constructing a one-mile synthetic racetrack. Janney expressed hope that more members of the public would be able to pay their respects to Ruffian in her new resting place.

== Racing statistics ==
Date	Age	Distance	Race	Grade	Track	Odds	Field	Finish	Winning Time	Margin	Jockey	Ref
May 25, 1974	2	5 1/2 furlongs	Maiden Special Weight		Belmont Park	4.20	10	1	1:03 (Note: Equaled track record)	15 lengths	Jacinto Vásquez	
Jun 12, 1974	2	5 1/2 furlongs	Fashion Stakes	III	Belmont Park	0.40*	6	1	1:03 (Note: Equaled own track record)	6 3/4 lengths	Jacinto Vásquez	
Jul 10, 1974	2	5 1/2 furlongs	Astoria Stakes	III	Aqueduct	0.10*	4	1	1:02 4/5 (Note: New stakes record. One-fifth off track record)	9 lengths	Vince Bracciale	
Jul 27, 1974	2	6 furlongs	Sorority Stakes	I	Monmouth Park	0.30*	4	1	1:09 (Note: New stakes record)	2 3/4 lengths	Jacinto Vásquez	
Aug 23, 1974	2	6 furlongs	Spinaway Stakes	I	Saratoga	0.20*	4	1	1:08 3/5 (Note: New stakes record)	12 3/4 lengths	Vince Bracciale	
Apr 14, 1975	3	6 furlongs	Allowance		Aqueduct	0.10*	5	1	1:09 2/5	4 3/4 lengths	Jacinto Vásquez	
Apr 30, 1975	3	7 furlongs	Comely Stakes	III	Aqueduct	0.05*	5	1	1:21 1/5 (Note: New stakes record)	7 3/4 lengths	Jacinto Vásquez	
May 10, 1975	3	1 mile	Acorn Stakes	I	Aqueduct	0.10*	7	1	1:34 2/5 (Note: New stakes record)	8 1/4 lengths	Jacinto Vásquez	
May 31, 1975	3	1 1/8 miles	Mother Goose Stakes	I	Aqueduct	0.10*	7	1	1:47 4/5 (Note: New stakes record)	13 1/2 lengths	Jacinto Vásquez	
Jun 22, 1975	3	1 1/2 miles	Coaching Club American Oaks	I	Belmont Park	0.10*	7	1	2:27 4/5 (Note: Tied stakes record)	2 3/4 lengths	Jacinto Vásquez	
Jul 6, 1975	3	1 1/4 miles	Match race	n/a	Belmont Park		2	DNF (Note: Did not finish)			Jacinto Vásquez	

An asterisk after the odds means Ruffian was the post-time favorite.

== Aftermath ==
Ruffian's breakdown and death led to a public outcry for more humane treatment of racehorses. As it is natural for horses to thrash and kick when coming out of anesthesia, a "recovery pool" was developed so that they awaken suspended in warm water and don't re-injure themselves. Medications such as corticosteroids for inflammation and pain management came into common use. However, while helping the horses in the short term, the increased use of medications at the track had a disadvantage, as many more horses were raced while injured. The average number of starts per year steadily declined, though this may also be attributable to economic factors.

Ruffian's breeding may be considered at least partly to blame for her broken leg; her sire, Reviewer, suffered three breakdowns in his racing career. After his fourth and last breakdown, which occurred while in his paddock, he had to be euthanized after surgery. Shenanigans, Ruffian's dam, was euthanized following intestinal surgery on May 21, 1977, when she broke two legs while recovering from anesthetic. Ruffian's damsire, Native Dancer, is considered by some to be the purveyor of "soft boned" genetics, primarily through his brilliant but unsound son Raise a Native. Inbreeding to Raise a Native may have been a factor in the later breakdown of Eight Belles.

Later research by Susan Stover showed that catastrophic breakdowns were most often preceded by smaller stress fractures, though the fracture Ruffian experienced as a two-year-old was in a different leg. To help prevent similar tragedies, the industry has directed research into improved early detection, surgical techniques and rehabilitation methods.

== Legacy ==
Ruffian posthumously earned the 1975 Eclipse Award for Outstanding Three-Year-Old Filly. In 1976, she was inducted into the National Museum of Racing and Hall of Fame. The Blood-Horse magazine ranked her 35th in its list of the top 100 U.S. thoroughbred champions of the 20th Century; she is the highest-rated filly (or mare) on the list. Sports Illustrated included her as the only non-human on their list of the top 100 female athletes of the century, ranking her 53rd.

In the summer of 1975, folk singer Joan Baez dedicated a version of the song "Stewball" to Ruffian.

Since 1976, the Ruffian Handicap has been run in Ruffian's honor. Until 2009, the race had been held at Belmont Park (on Long Island, New York), but it was moved upstate to Saratoga Race Course in 2010. In 2014, the Ruffian Handicap was moved back to Belmont Park.

The Ruffian Equine Medical Center, now known as Cornell Ruffian Equine Specialists, opened on May 26, 2009. It cost $18 million to build and is located outside Gate 8 of Belmont Park. The facility offers a wide range of services ranging from acute care for race related injuries to preventative care and farrier consultations.

Ruffian has many nicknames, such as "Queen of the Fillies", "Queen of the Century", "Queen of Racing", "Queen of the Track", "Filly of the Century", "The Super Filly", the "Black Terror" and more. Several books about her have been published, including Ruffian, Burning from the Start, Ruffian, A Racetrack Romance, Ruffian: Horse Racing's Black Beauty, and The Licorice Daughter, My Year with Ruffian.

In Lexington, Kentucky, the road into the Masterson Station Park is named "Ruffian Way" and a monument in her honor can be found inside the park. It reads, "This memorial erected in memory of Ruffian, dark bay thoroughbred filly. We were young when she died, too young to remember her with the greats of other eras. Yet to love grace and perfection is ours because we are human and none felt her loss more painfully than we. The Children of Lexington – 1975"

In Japan, the horse owner club Thoroughbred Club Ruffian is named after the horse, as the founder, Shigeyuki Okada, is said to have met the horse when he was training in the United States.

== Pedigree ==
Ruffian was by Reviewer, a talented racehorse who was injured in each of the three seasons he raced. In a short career at stud, he sired two outstanding fillies, Ruffian and Revidere, but failed to sire a son capable of continuing his line.

Shenanigans had three wins in 22 starts for the Janneys and later became a broodmare. In addition to Ruffian, Shenanigans produced graded stakes winner and sire Icecapade, the filly Laughter, who produced several stakes winners, and Buckfinder, a stakes winner and sire. Shenanigans was named the 1975 Kentucky Broodmare of the Year.

Pedigree of Ruffian
Sire Reviewer	Bold Ruler	Nasrullah	Nearco
Sire Reviewer	Bold Ruler	Nasrullah	Mumtaz Begum
Sire Reviewer	Bold Ruler	Miss Disco	Discovery
Sire Reviewer	Bold Ruler	Miss Disco	Outdone
Sire Reviewer	Broadway	Hasty Road	Roman
Sire Reviewer	Broadway	Hasty Road	Traffic Court
Sire Reviewer	Broadway	Flitabout	Challedon
Sire Reviewer	Broadway	Flitabout	Bird Flower
Dam Shenanigans	Native Dancer	Polynesian	Unbreakable
Dam Shenanigans	Native Dancer	Polynesian	Black Polly
Dam Shenanigans	Native Dancer	Geisha	Discovery
Dam Shenanigans	Native Dancer	Geisha	Miyako
Dam Shenanigans	Bold Irish	Fighting Fox	Sir Gallahad
Dam Shenanigans	Bold Irish	Fighting Fox	Marguerite
Dam Shenanigans	Bold Irish	Erin	Transmute
Dam Shenanigans	Bold Irish	Erin	Rosie O'Grady (family 8-c)

== See also ==
- List of leading Thoroughbred racehorses
- List of racehorses
