= Revidere =

American-bred Thoroughbred racehorse

- Sire: Reviewer
- Grandsire: Bold Ruler
- Dam: Quillesian
- Damsire: Princequillo
- Sex: Filly
- Foaled: 1973
- Country: United States
- Colour: Bay
- Breeder: Claiborne Farm
- Owner: William Haggin Perry
- Trainer: David A. Whiteley
- Record: 11-8-2-1
- Earnings: US$330,019

Major wins
- Coaching Club American Oaks (1976); Ruffian Stakes (1976); Monmouth Bicentennial Oaks (1976); Cotillion Handicap (1976); Gazelle Handicap (1976)

Awards
- American Champion Three-Year-Old Filly (1976)

Honours
- Revidere Stakes at Monmouth Park Racetrack
- Last updated on 20 April 2021

Revidere (foaled in 1973 in Kentucky) was an American Thoroughbred racehorse that was voted the 1976 Eclipse Award as the American Champion Three-Year-Old Filly.Her sire was Reviewer, who is best known as the sire of champion filly Ruffian. Her dam was Quillesian.

In her championship year on 9 October 1976, Revidere won the inaugural Ruffian Stakes defeating the Argentine bred Bastonera II by 14 lengths.

Retired to serve as a broodmare, Revidere was bred to stallions such as Hoist The Flag, Lyphard, Alydar, Alleged, Slew o' Gold, and owner William Haggin Perry's Belmont Stakes winner, Coastal.
