= Fetlock =

Joint found in horses

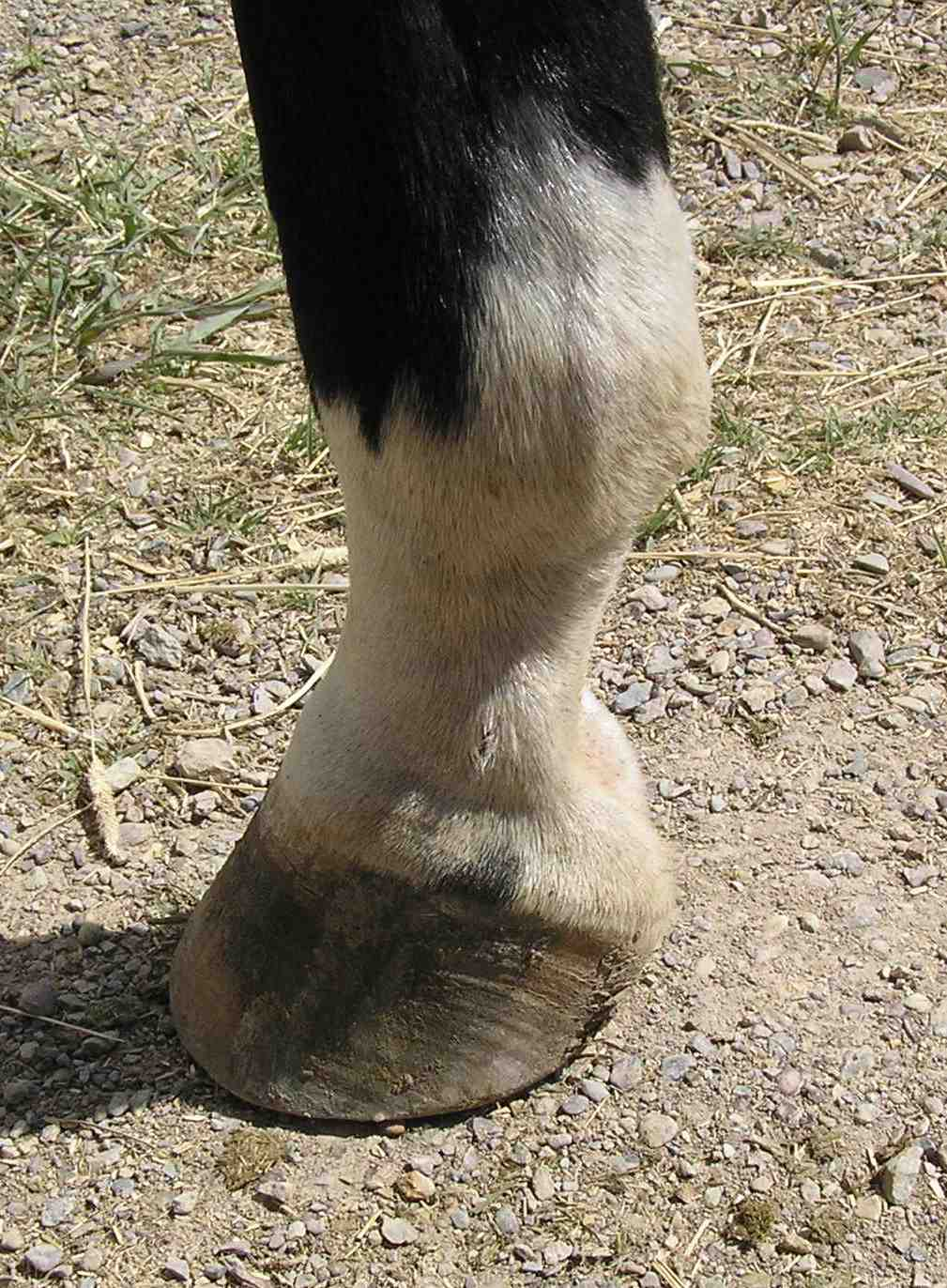
Fetlock joint: the joint between the cannon bone and the pastern

Fetlock is the common name in horses, large animals, and sometimes dogs for the metacarpophalangeal and metatarsophalangeal joints (MCPJ and MTPJ).

Although it somewhat resembles the human ankle in appearance, the joint is homologous to the ball of the foot. In anatomical terms, the hoof corresponds to the toe, rather than the whole human foot.

== Etymology and related terminology ==
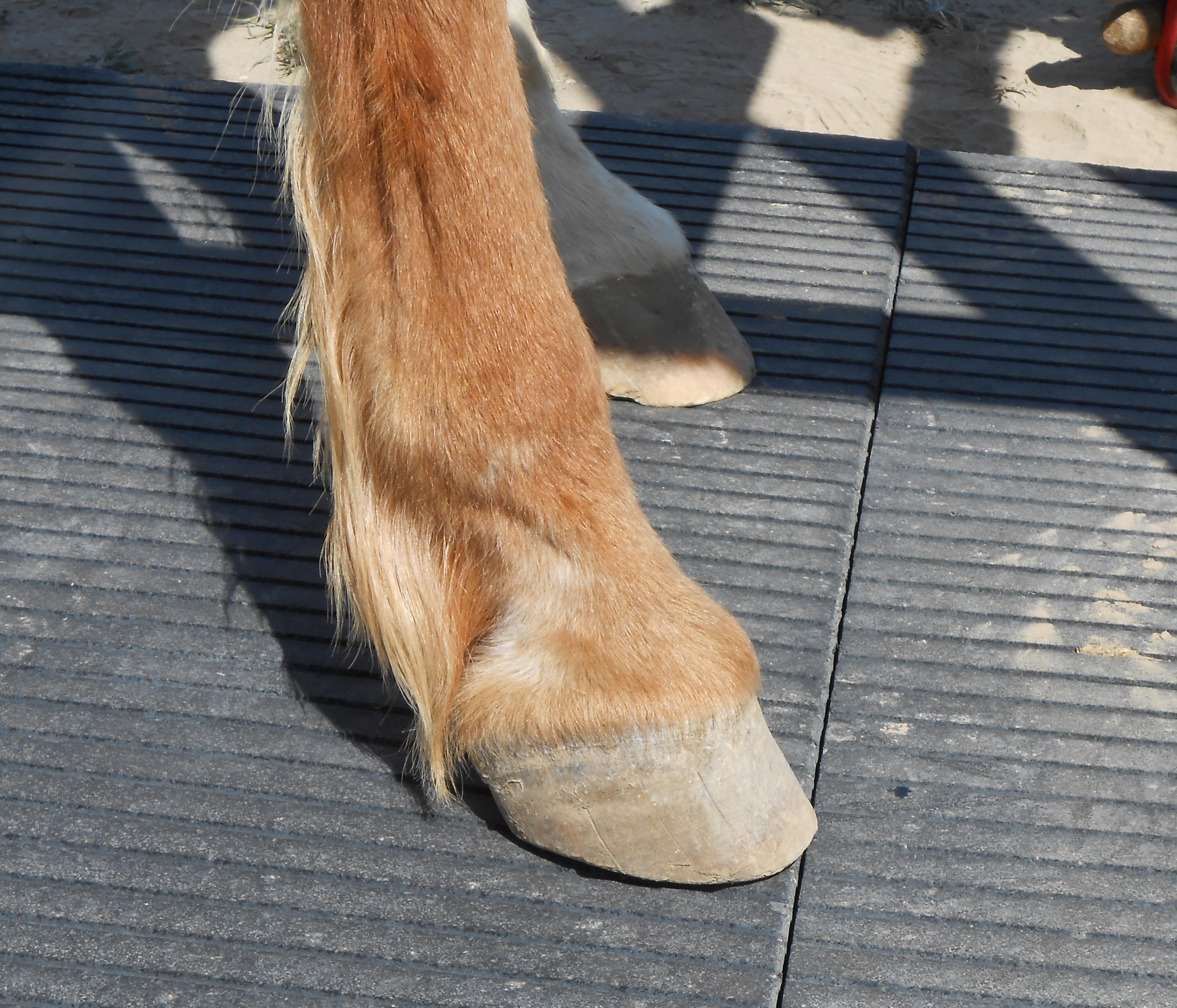
Typical untrimmed tuft of hair on the fetlock of a light, non-draft breed of horse

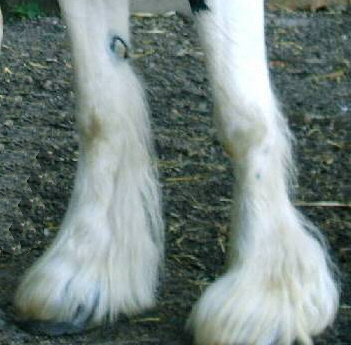
Detail of feather or feathering that covers the fetlock and hoof, seen on many draft breeds

The word fetlock literally means "foot-lock" and refers to the small tuft of hair situated on the rear of the fetlock joint.

"Feather" refers to the particularly long, luxuriant hair growth over the lower leg and fetlock that is characteristic of certain breeds.

== Formation ==
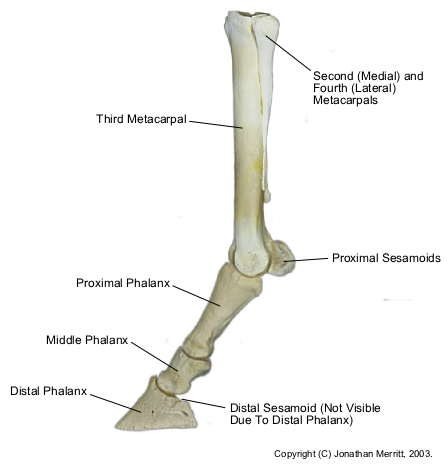
Skeleton of the lower forelimb

A fetlock (a MCPJ or a MTPJ) is formed by the junction of the third metacarpal (in the forelimb) or metatarsal (in the hindlimb) bones, either of which are commonly called the cannon bones, proximally and the proximal phalanx distally, commonly called the pastern bone.

Paired proximal sesamoid bones form the joint with the palmar or plantar distal surface of the third metacarpal or metatarsal bones, and are tightly attached to the proximo-palmar or -plantar edge of the proximal phalanx.

== As a hinge joint ==
The fetlock is a hinge joint (ginglymus), allowing flexion and extension, but only allowing minimal rotation, adduction, or abduction.

== Anatomy compared to that of humans ==
While the fetlock is sometimes colloquially referred to as an "ankle", even by horse experts, that terminology is misleading. The ankle joint in humans corresponds to the hock of horses. The fetlock is a metacarpo- or metatarsophalangeal joint which corresponds to the human upper knuckle, such as that on the ball of the foot. This usage likely originated from early definitions of "ankle" as "between foot and leg" derived from the common root of "angle" meaning to bend.

== Problems with the fetlock ==
- Windpuffs
- Sesamoiditis
- Osselet

In thoroughbred race horses, the fetlock is involved in roughly 50% of catastrophic racing injuries.

== See also ==
- Equine forelimb anatomy
- Equine anatomy
