= Osselet =

Veterinary condition in horses

Osselet is arthritis in the fetlock joint of a horse, caused by trauma. Osselets usually occur in the front legs of the horse, because there is more strain and concussion on the fetlock there than in the hind legs. The arthritis will occur at the joint between the cannon bone and large pastern bone, at the front of the fetlock.

== Definition ==
Osselets refers to the inflammation of the connective tissue that is around the cannon bone and the fetlock joint. Inflammation can involve arthritis and can become a degenerative joint disease. The condition is a job risk for young thoroughbreds and is usually caused by stress and due to the trauma of repeated hard training in young horses. The first thing that appears on a horse with osselets is a swelling in the front part of the fetlock joint, there may be synovial strains on the sides of the joint. It is painful for the horse to flex the joint and usually causes lameness.

== Fetlock joint ==
Definition

Fetlock is the common name for the metacarpophalangeal and metatarsophalangeal joints of horses, is a rotatory joint that can exhibit the greatest range of motion of any equine joint. The fetlock joint is formed between the large metacarpal or metatarsal bone (in the forelimb and hindlimb) and the proximal sesamoid bones.

Relation with osselet

Osselets is caused by stress on the fetlock, which results in a stretching of the joint capsule. If the inflammation damages the cartilage of the joint, swelling in that area can become chronic and permanent. The joint capsule can also thicken.

== Causes and effects ==
Osselets is caused by stress on the fetlock, which results in a stretching of the joint capsule. The early stage is called green osselets, and is characterized by a hot, soft swelling at the fetlock. If inflammation damages the cartilage of the joint, the swelling may become chronic and permanent. Eventually, the bones of the joint will become involved, causing arthritis, pain, stiffness, and periostitis (new bone growth). The fibers of the joint capsule will also increase in size. The long pastern bone may also eventually chip at its front edge, which will leave bone fragments in the joint.

Horses with short, upright pasterns are predisposed to develop osselets, as this conformation promotes concussion of the fetlock joint.

Other contributors to the horse contracting the osselets include uneven tensions in the fetlock joint (usually due to poor or unbalanced footwear), irregular terrain and hasty conditioning. The latter often causes muscle fatigue and does not protect the horse's joints from tripping or "bad steps" while working.<refname=Briggs/>

== Diagnosis ==
The horse will suffer pain in flexion, or when the animal presses on the affected front of the fetlock, it is indicative of osselets, as is the short and short march that is the result of when both frontal fetlocks are involved. (Shoulder problems can also cause a horse to move that way, so watch carefully.) The heat and swelling around the fetlock will be obvious when a horse has osselets.

== Treatment ==
When it first appears, it can be cured with rest, which is very important for treatment. To relieve inflammation, it is advisable to apply cold compresses for several days. Anti-inflammatory medications administered orally or by injection may also be used. Another treatment would be to inject corticosteroids into the joint. However, if this kind of medication is used while the horse continues its continuous training or racing, they will inevitably lead to the destruction of joint surfaces.

== See also ==
- Equine forelimb anatomy
- Equine anatomy
