= Shenanigans (horse) =

American-bred Thoroughbred racehorse

- Sire: Native Dancer
- Grandsire: Polynesian
- Dam: Bold Irish
- Damsire: Fighting Fox
- Sex: Mare
- Foaled: 1963
- Country: United States
- Colour: Grey
- Breeder: Stuart S. Janney Jr. & Barbara Janney
- Owner: Stuart & Barbara Janney
- Record: 22:3-1-6
- Earnings: $18,120

Awards
- Kentucky Broodmare of the Year (1975)
- Last updated on November 13, 2024

Shenanigans (17 March 1963 – 21 May 1977) was an American thoroughbred mare born in Kentucky. She was sired by Native Dancer and out of the Locust Hill Farm's foundation mare, Bold Irish.

Owner Stuart S. Janney Jr. recalled, "Shenanigans was meant to be a good mare, she had speed and she was second to Miss Spin in the Maryland Futurity, but she developed a little calcium in a knee. She raced a little bit at three, but we decided she wasn't going to be able to win a stakes, so we stopped with her." The Janneys considered sending her to Bold Ruler for her first season, but she was sent to Knightly Manner instead and failed to conceive. The next breeding was with Nearctic. This resulted in the gray Icecapade, who was a successful stakes racer and sire. In 1970, Shenanigans foaled another gray (this time by Bold Ruler), a filly named Laughter who like her mother excelled in the breeding shed when she beget horses like Private Terms but was at best mediocre on the track. In 1971, Shenanigans was bred to a son of Bold Ruler, Bold Lad, which resulted in a colt, On To Glory, who was a winner but not a stakes performer. He did, however, produce a couple of graded stakes winners while at stud.

In 1972, Shenanigans foaled her most famous progeny: a brown filly by Reviewer named Ruffian. This tall, almost jet black filly destroyed track and stakes records for two seasons before she broke down in a match race against Kentucky Derby winner Foolish Pleasure. Many claim that Ruffian's tragic end was a product of her breeding. Her sire broke down four times: three times while racing and the last time in a paddock accident where he re-broke a fracture he had sustained a few weeks earlier in another barn accident. After Ruffian, Shenanigans had two more foals: a stakes winner and sire in 1974 called Buckfinder, by Buckpasser, and one more winner in 1977 named Near East, by Damascus. She was named Kentucky Broodmare for the year 1975.

On 21 May 1977, Shenanigans died similarly to her daughter when she awoke from anesthesia after intestinal surgery and began to thrash wildly, breaking two of her legs. She could not endure another surgery and was euthanized.

== Pedigree ==
Pedigree of Shenanigans, gray filly, 1963
Sire Native Dancer	Polynesian	Unbreakable	Sickle
Sire Native Dancer	Polynesian	Unbreakable	Blue Glass
Sire Native Dancer	Polynesian	Black Polly	Polymelian
Sire Native Dancer	Polynesian	Black Polly	Black Queen
Sire Native Dancer	Geisha	Discovery	Display
Sire Native Dancer	Geisha	Discovery	Ariadne
Sire Native Dancer	Geisha	Miyako	John P. Grier
Sire Native Dancer	Geisha	Miyako	La Chica
Dam Bold Irish	Fighting Fox	Sir Gallahad	Teddy
Dam Bold Irish	Fighting Fox	Sir Gallahad	Plucky Liege
Dam Bold Irish	Fighting Fox	Marguerite	Celt
Dam Bold Irish	Fighting Fox	Marguerite	Fairy Ray
Dam Bold Irish	Erin	Transmute	Broomstick
Dam Bold Irish	Erin	Transmute	Traverse
Dam Bold Irish	Erin	Rosie O'Grady	Hamburg
Dam Bold Irish	Erin	Rosie O'Grady	Cherokee Rose (family: 8-c)
