= Reviewer (horse) =

American-bred Thoroughbred racehorse

- Reviewer's grave at Claiborne Farm
- Sire: Bold Ruler
- Grandsire: Nasrullah
- Dam: Broadway
- Damsire: Hasty Road
- Sex: Stallion
- Foaled: 1966
- Country: United States
- Color: Dark Bay
- Breeder: Ogden Phipps
- Owner: Ogden Phipps
- Trainer: Edward A. Neloy
- Record: 13: 9-3-1
- Earnings: US$247,223

Major wins
- Sapling Stakes (1968); Saratoga Special Stakes (1968); Bay Shore Stakes (1969); Swift Stakes (1969); Roseben Handicap (1970); Nassau County Handicap (1970)

Reviewer (April 30, 1966 – June 6, 1977) was an American Thoroughbred racehorse best known as the sire of U.S. Racing Hall of Fame filly Ruffian.

== Background ==
Foaled in Kentucky, the dark bay colt was owned and bred by Ogden Phipps. He was a son of Bold Ruler, an important Champion sire, and his damsire was Hasty Road, who won the 1954 Preakness Stakes.

== Racing career ==
Trained by Hall of Fame inductee Edward A. Neloy, in 1970 the then four-year-old Reviewer set a new Belmont Park track record of 1:46 4/5 for 1 1/8 miles (1.8 km) in winning the Nassau County Handicap. He finished his racing career with a record of 13: 9–3–1, and he won $247,223.

== Stud record ==
Ruffian was foaled in Reviewer's first crop. The filly was euthanized in 1975 following surgery to repair a broken leg sustained in a race. Reviewer himself broke three legs during his career before being retired to stud; he suffered a fourth broken leg in a paddock accident at Claiborne Farm and was subsequently euthanized. Shenanigans, Ruffian's mother, was euthanized on May 21, 1977, when she broke two legs after waking from an intestinal surgery. Among his other progeny, Reviewer sired the 1976 American Champion Three-Year-Old Filly Revidere and the good runner Drama Critic (b. 1974).

== Pedigree ==
Pedigree of Reviewer, bay stallion, 1966
Sire Bold Ruler	Nasrullah	Nearco	Pharos
Sire Bold Ruler	Nasrullah	Nearco	Nogara
Sire Bold Ruler	Nasrullah	Mumtaz Begum	Blenheim
Sire Bold Ruler	Nasrullah	Mumtaz Begum	Mumtaz Mahal
Sire Bold Ruler	Miss Disco	Discovery	Display
Sire Bold Ruler	Miss Disco	Discovery	Ariadne
Sire Bold Ruler	Miss Disco	Outdone	Pompey
Sire Bold Ruler	Miss Disco	Outdone	Sweep Out
Dam Broadway	Hasty Road	Roman	Sir Gallahad
Dam Broadway	Hasty Road	Roman	Buckup
Dam Broadway	Hasty Road	Traffic Court	Discovery
Dam Broadway	Hasty Road	Traffic Court	Traffic
Dam Broadway	Flitabout	Challedon	Challenger
Dam Broadway	Flitabout	Challedon	Laura Gal
Dam Broadway	Flitabout	Bird Flower	Blue Larkspur
Dam Broadway	Flitabout	Bird Flower	La Mome (family: 5-c)
