= Mermaid Stakes =

- Class: Discontinued stakes
- Location: Sheepshead Bay Race Track; Sheepshead Bay, Brooklyn, New York
- Inaugurated: 1880–1910
- Race type: Thoroughbred – Flat racing

Race information
- Distance: 1 mile (8 furlongs)
- Surface: Dirt
- Track: left-handed
- Qualification: Three-year-old fillies

The Mermaid Stakes was an American Thoroughbred horse race run annually at Sheepshead Bay Race Track in Sheepshead Bay, Brooklyn. An important event for three-year-old fillies, the race was run on dirt over a distance of one mile and one furlong until 1910 when it was set at one mile.

First run in 1880, there was no race from 1895 through 1901. During the twenty-four years the race was held, it was won by eight Champions of which four would be elected to the National Museum of Racing and Hall of Fame. The final running in 1910 was won by Lily Livingston's Amelia Jenks in a major upset over Ocean Bound, the undefeated 1909 American Champion Two-Year-Old Filly.

On June 11, 1908, the Republican controlled New York Legislature under Governor Charles Evans Hughes passed the Hart–Agnew anti-betting legislation with penalties allowing for fines and up to a year in prison. The owners of Sheepshead Bay Race Track, and other racing facilities in New York State, struggled to stay in business without betting. Racetrack operators had no choice but to drastically reduce the purse money being paid out which by 1909 saw the Mermaid Stakes offering a purse that was as little as one-third of what it had been in earlier years. Further restrictive legislation was passed by the New York Legislature in 1910 which deepened the financial crisis for track operators and led to a complete shut down of racing across the state during 1911 and 1912. When a Court ruling saw racing return in 1913 it was too late for the Sheepshead Bay horse racing facility and it never reopened.

Champions who won the Mermaid Stakes:

1. Miss Woodford (HoF)
2. Firenze (HoF)
3. Yorkville Belle
4. Beldemere
5. Beldame (HoF)
6. Perverse
7. Stamina
8. Maskette (HoF)

== Records ==
Speed record:

- 1:52 flat, 1 1/8 miles, Maskette (1909)

Most wins by a jockey:

- 3 – Jim McLaughlin (1883, 1887, 1888)

Most wins by a trainer:

- 4 – James G. Rowe Sr. (1883, 1889, 1890, 1909)

Most wins by an owner:

- 2 – Dwyer Brothers Stable (1883, 1888)
- 2 – August Belmont Jr. (1889, 1990)
- 2 – Harry Payne Whitney (1906, 1908)

== Winners ==
Year	Winner	Jockey	Trainer	Owner	Dist. (Miles)	Time	Win$
1910	Amelia Jenks	Matt McGee	Matthew Feakes	Lily A. Livingston	1 M	1:39.40	$1,450
1909	Maskette	Richard Scoville	James G. Rowe Sr.	James R. Keene	11/8 M	1:52.00	$3,990
1908	Stamina	Eddie Dugan	A. Jack Joyner	Harry Payne Whitney	11/8 M	1:53.00	$4,875
1907	Yankee Girl	Herman Radtke	George P. Brazier	Charles R. Ellison	11/8 M	1:54.80	$4,870
1906	Perverse	Lucien Lyne	John W. Rogers	Harry Payne Whitney	11/8 M	1:54.00	$3,600
1905	Tradition	Willie Davis	A. Jack Joyner	Sydney Paget	11/8 M	1:58.60	$4,360
1904	Beldame	Frank O'Neill	Fred Burlew	Newton Bennington	11/8 M	1:54.40	$5,570
1903	Daisy Green	John Bullman	Harry M. Mason	John N. Follansbee	11/8 M	1:59.60	$4,480
1902	Gunfire	Tommy Burns	John W. Rogers	William C. Whitney	11/8 M	1:54.80	$3,315
1895	– 1901	Race not held					
1894	Beldemere	Willie Simms	Edward Feakes	Preakness Stables	11/8 M	1:56.00	$5,160
1893	Afternoon	Samuel Doggett	John W. Rogers	Samuel S. Brown	11/8 M	1:56.80	$3,510
1892	Yorkville Belle	Isaac Burns Murphy	Matthew M. Allen	Frank A. Ehret	11/8 M	2:00.60	$3,810
1891	Equity	George Taylor	John Huggins	J. Gardner Cassatt	11/8 M	1:56.20	$4,400
1890	Her Highness	Anthony Hamilton	James G. Rowe Sr.	August Belmont Sr.	11/8 M	1:57.00	$5,080
1889	She	Edward Garrison	James G. Rowe Sr.	August Belmont Sr.	11/8 M	1:56.00	$4,730
1888	Bella B	Jim McLaughlin	Frank McCabe	Dwyer Brothers Stable	11/8 M	1:57.25	$5,280
1887	Firenze	Jim McLaughlin	Matthew Byrnes	James Ben Ali Haggin	11/8 M	1:56.00	$4,340
1886	Bandala	Fred Littlefield	Charles Boyle	Richmond Stable	11/8 M	2:02.00	$3,870
1885	Wanda	Harris Olney	Matthew Byrnes	Rancocas Stable	11/8 M	1:59.50	$3,470
1884	Duchess	William Donohue	Evert V. Snedecker	E. V. Snedeker & Co.	11/8 M	1:59.00	$3,150
1883	Miss Woodford	Jim McLaughlin	James G. Rowe Sr.	Dwyer Brothers Stable	11/8 M	1:58.25	$3,600
1882	Hiawasse	Edward Feakes	Matthew Byrnes	Pierre Lorillard IV	11/8 M	1:57.25	$2,700
1881	Thora	William Donohue	James Lee	Charles Reed	11/8 M	1:57.00	$2,150
1880	Glidelia	William Donohue	George Rice	William M. Conner	11/8 M	1:59.50	$1950
