= Monmouth Oaks =

- Class: Grade III
- Location: Monmouth Park Racetrack; Oceanport, New Jersey, USA
- Inaugurated: 1871
- Race type: Thoroughbred – Flat racing
- Website: www.monmouthpark.com/haskell/pastwinners.asp?pwid=39

Race information
- Distance: 1 1/16 miles
- Surface: Dirt
- Track: left-handed
- Qualification: Three-year-old fillies
- Weight: 122 lbs., allowances to 6 lbs. for non winners
- Purse: $259,000 (2021)

The Monmouth Oaks is an American Thoroughbred horse race held annually at Monmouth Park Racetrack in Oceanport, New Jersey for three-year-old fillies. Named for England's Epsom Oaks, first run in 1779, the inaugural American edition took place in 1871. Originally raced over a distance of 1 1/2 miles from 1871 through 1877, there was no race in 1878 but on its return the following year was modified to 1 1/4 miles.

In 1891, the New Jersey Legislature began a move to ban parimutuel betting and the Oaks had to be moved to the Jerome Park Racetrack in The Bronx, New York. With a legislated permanent ban, after the 1893 running the Monmouth Park Racetrack was shut down and the property sold. In 1946, Thoroughbred racing returned to a new Monmouth Park racing facility. The revived Monmouth Oaks was set at 1 1/16 miles.

== Historical notes ==
Over the years, the Oaks has been won by some of the best fillies in the United States including U.S. Racing Hall of Fame inductees, Dark Mirage (1968), Gallant Bloom (1969) and Desert Vixen (1973).

The inaugural running at the Long Branch track took place on July 6, 1871, and the mile and one-half race was won by Kentuckian Abraham Buford's Salina, a daughter of Lexington and out of the mare Lightsome by Glencoe.

In winning the 1956 edition of the Monmouth Oaks, Levee's time of 1:48 4/5 broke the track record for a mile and one-eighth on dirt.

In 1969 Gallant Bloom earned her fourth straight win of the year, capturing the Oaks by 12 lengths.

Spain won the 2000 running of the Monmouth Oaks then went on to win that year's Breeders' Cup Distaff for owner Prince Ahmed bin Salman's The Thoroughbred Corp. Spain retired as the richest mare in North American racing history.

== Records ==
Speed record:

- 1:41.54 @ 1-1/16 miles: Shahama. (2022)
- 1:48.00 @ 1-1/8 miles: Golden Horde (1985) & Without Feathers (1987)
- 2:12.50 @ 1 1/4 miles: Firenze (1887)
- 2:42.00 @ 1 1/2 miles: Woodbine (1872)

Most wins by a jockey:

- 5 - Eddie Arcaro (1947, 1949, 1950, 1954, 1955)

Most wins by a trainer:

- 6 - Todd A. Pletcher (2004, 2006, 2011, 2016, 2022, 2024)

Most wins by an owner:

- 3 - August Belmont Sr. (1872, 1876, 1890)
- 3 - Pierre Lorillard IV (1877, 1882, 1885)

== Winners ==
Year	Winner	Jockey	Trainer	Owner	Dist. (Miles)	Time	Purse $	Gr.
2026	My Miss Mo	Micah J. Husbands	Saffie A. Joseph Jr.	Averill Racing, Mathis Stable and Tristan De Meric	1 1/16 m	1:43.29	$150,000	G3
2025	Running Away	Victor Espinoza	Wesley Ward	Stud TNT	1-1/16 m	1:46.26	$252,000	G3
2024	Scalable	Paco Lopez	Todd A. Pletcher	Repole Stable	1-1/16 m	1:44.71	$255,500	G3
2023	Occult	Feargal Lynch	Chad C. Brown	Alpha Delta Stables	1-1/16 m	1:45.74	$262,500	G3
2022	Shahama	Jorge A. Vargas Jr.	Todd A. Pletcher	KHK Racing LLC	1-1/16 m	1:41.54	$245,000	G3
2021	Leader of the Band	Frankie Pennington	John Servis	SMD Limited	1-1/16 m	1:43.44	$259,000	G3
2020	Hopeful Growth	Antonio A. Gallardo	Anthony R. Margotta Jr.	St. Elias Stable	1-1/16 m	1:45.63	$212,000	G3
2019	Horologist	Angel Suarez	John F. Mazza	There's A Chance Stable (racing partnership)	1-1/16 m	1:44.44	$150,000	G3
2018	Skeptic	Brian Hernandez Jr.	George R. Arnold II	G. Watts Humphrey Jr., Ashbrook Farm	1-1/16 m	1:43.84	$106,000	G3
2017	Teresa Z	Nik Juarez	Anthony Margotta Jr.	St. Elias Stable	1-1/16 m	1:43.43	$100,000	G3
2016	Unbridled Mo	Paco Lopez	Todd A. Pletcher	Red Oak Stable	1-1/16 m	1:44.35	$100,000	G3
2015	Delightful Joy	Paco Lopez	Chad C. Brown	Sheep Pond Partners, Robert V. LaPenta, Bradley Thoroughbreds	1-1/16 m	1:43.74	$100,000	G3
2014	Cassatt	Kerwin D. Clark	J. Larry Jones	Fox Hill Farms	1-1/16 m	1:44.34	$105,000	G3
2013	Seaneen Girl	Paco Lopez	Bernard S. Flint	Naveed Chowhan	1-1/16 m	1:44.04	$100,000	G3
2012	Wine Princess	Joe Bravo	Steve Margolis	Pearl Bloodstock	1-1/16 m	1:44.11	$101,000	G3
2011	Savvy Supreme	Elvis Trujillo	Todd A. Pletcher	WinStar Farm	1-1/16 m	1:43.27	$159,000	G3
2010	No Such Word	Terry J. Thompson	Cindy Jones	Brereton C. Jones	1-1/16 m	1:45.10	$200,000	G3
2009	Just Jenda	Gabriel Saez	Larry Jones	Cindy Jones	1-1/16 m	1:43.69	$200,000	G3
2008	Maren's Meadow	Terry J. Thompson	Larry Jones	River Ridge Ranch	1-1/16 m	1:44.05	$150,000	G3
2007	Talkin About Love	Stewart Elliott	Kevin Sleeter	Kevin Sleeter	1-1/16 m	1:43.78	$200,000	G3
2006	Mo Cuishle	José A. Santos	Todd A. Pletcher	Martin, O'Grady, Rucker	1-1/16 m	1:43.00	$200,000	G3
2005	Flying Glitter	Elvis Trujillo	Ronny Werner	Richard & Nancy Kaster	1-1/16 m	1:44.60	$200,000	G3
2004	Capeside Lady	Chris Decarlo	Todd A. Pletcher	So Madcapt Stable	1-1/16 m	1:42.00	$200,000	G2
2003	Race not held							
2002	Magic Storm	Edwin L. King Jr.	D. Wayne Lukas	Overbrook & William A. Marquard	1-1/8 m	1:51.00	$250,000	G2
2001	Unbridled Elaine	Eibar Coa	David R. Vance	Roger J. Davenport	1-1/8 m	1:51.00	$250,000	G2
2000	Spain	José A. Vélez Jr.	D. Wayne Lukas	The Thoroughbred Corp.	1-1/16 m	1:42.60	$250,000	G2
1999	Silverbulletday	Jerry Bailey	Bob Baffert	Michael E. Pegram	1-1/16 m	1:43.00	$200,000	G2
1998	Kirby's Song	Todd Kabel	Tino Attard	Kirby Canada Farm	1-1/16 m	1:43.20	$200,000	G2
1997	Blushing K. D.	Lonnie Meche	Sam B. David Jr.	James & Sue Burns	1-1/16 m	1:41.80	$200,000	G2
1996	Top Secret	Joe Bravo	George R. Arnold II	John H. Peace	1-1/16 m	1:42.20	$200,000	G2
1995	Kathie's Colleen	Jim McAleney	Mike Keogh	Gustav Schickedanz	1-1/8 m	1:51.40	$150,000	G2
1994	Two Altazano	Craig Perret	Michael Stidham	Harold V. Goodman	1-1/8 m	1:52.00	$150,000	G2
1993	Jacody	Tom Turner	William Donovan	Minrashe Nanbri	1-1/8 m	1:50.60	$150,000	G2
1992	Diamond Duo	Tom Turner	William Donovan	H & D Stable	1-1/8 m	1:51.40	$150,000	G2
1991	Fowda	Richard Migliore	Richard J. Lundy	Allen E. Paulson	1-1/8 m	1:50.40	$150,000	G2
1990	Pampered Star	José C. Ferrer	Robert J. Frankel	Morley Engelson	1-1/8 m	1:52.40	$150,000	G2
1989	Dream Deal	Craig Perret	Joseph H. Pierce Jr.	G. Watts Humphrey Jr.	1-1/8 m	1:49.20	$150,000	G1
1988	Maplejinsky	Chris Antley	Phillip G. Johnson	Susan Kaskel	1-1/8 m	1:53.60	$175,000	G1
1987	Without Feathers	Chris Antley	D. Wayne Lukas	Dennis Donahue	1-1/8 m	1:48.00	$160,400	G1
1986	Fighter Fox	Herb McCauley	LeRoy Jolley	Kentucky Blue Stable	1-1/8 m	1:49.60	$166,950	G1
1985	Golden Horde	Herb McCauley	J. Willard Thompson	Mrs. J. W. Walker Jr.	1-1/8 m	1:48.00	$162,300	G1
1984	Life's Magic	Jorge Velásquez	D. Wayne Lukas	Mel Hatley & Gene Klein	1-1/8 m	1:50.00	$161,750	G1
1983	Quixotic Lady	Eddie Maple	Woody Stephens	Ross Valley Farm	1-1/8 m	1:50.40	$107,950	G1
1982	Christmas Past	Jacinto Vásquez	Angel Penna Jr.	Cynthia Phipps	1-1/8 m	1:48.80	$111,750	G1
1981	Prismatical	Don Brumfield	Laz Barrera	Happy Valley Farm	1-1/8 m	1:49.80	$82,500	G1
1980	Rose of Morn	Don Brumfield	Robert G. Vanwert	Meadow Stable	1-1/8 m	1:50.40	$55,050	G1
1979	Burn's Return	Jacinto Vásquez	Scotty Schulhofer	Ivanhoe Stable	1-1/8 m	1:48.80	$54,950	G1
1978	Sharp Belle	B. Douglas Thomas	Warren A. Croll Jr.	Aisco Stable	1-1/8 m	1:52.40	$55,050	G1
1977	Small Raja	Mickey Solomone	Thomas J. Kelly	David P. Reynolds	1-1/8 m	1:49.60	$55,350	G1
1976	Revidere	Jacinto Vásquez	David A. Whiteley	William Haggin Perry	1-1/8 m	1:50.60	$55,750	G1
1975	Aunt Jin	Carlos H. Marquez Sr.	W. "Sonny" Hightower	Paul Cresci	1-1/8 m	1:49.20	$54,300	G1
1974	Honky Star	Walter Blum	Gordon Potter	Dan Lasater	1-1/8 m	1:49.40	$59,450	G1
1973	Desert Vixen	Michael Hole	Thomas F. Root Sr.	Harry T. Mangurian Jr.	1-1/8 m	1:49.00	$57,650	G1
1972	Summer Guest	Ron Turcotte	J. Elliott Burch	Rokeby Stable	1-1/8 m	1:50.20	$56,500	
1971	Forward Gal	Michael Hole	Warren A. Croll Jr.	Aisco Stable	1-1/8 m	1:49.20	$57,700	
1970	Kilts N Kapers	Garth Patterson	Harold H. Goodwin	Mrs. M. W. Schott	1-1/8 m	1:50.40	$57,450	
1969	Gallant Bloom	Braulio Baeza	William J. Hirsch	King Ranch	1-1/8 m	1:50.80	$54,150	
1968	Dark Mirage	Manuel Ycaza	Everett W. King	Lloyd I. Miller	1-1/8 m	1:51.40	$54,650	
1967	Quillo Queen	Ernest Cardone	James E. Picou	Martin Anderson	1-1/8 m	1:52.20	$54,150	
1966	Natashka	Bill Shoemaker	William A. Peterson	George F. Getty II	1-1/8 m	1:50.40	$54,650	
1965	Summer Scandal	Garth Patterson	Woods Garth	Harborvale Stable	1-1/8 m	1:50.60	$57,350	
1964	Miss Cavandish	Howard Grant	Roger Laurin	Harry S. Nichols	1-1/8 m	1:50.80	56,250	
1963	Lamb Chop	Howard Grant	James W. Maloney	William Haggin Perry	1-1/8 m	1:51.60	$56,100	
1962	Firm Policy	Johnny Sellers	E. Barry Ryan	E. Barry Ryan	1-1/8 m	1:49.80	$57,200	
1961	My Portrait	Ray Broussard	Julius E. Tinsley Jr.	Fred W. Hooper	1-1/8 m	1:48.80	$56,800	
1960	Teacation	Walter Blum	Charles R. Parke	Fred W. Hooper	1-1/8 m	1:49.40	$57,900	
1959	Royal Native	Joe Culmone	Kenny Noe Sr.	Perne L. Grissom	1-1/8 m	1:50.60	$55,000	
1958	A Glitter	Ismael Valenzuela	Horace A. Jones	Calumet Farm	1-1/8 m	1:52.40	$56,600	
1957	Romanita	Jack Skelly	Frankie Sanders	Reverie Knoll Farm (Freeman Keyes)	1-1/8 m	1:50.20	$59,700	
1956	Levee	Hedley Woodhouse	Norman R. McLeod	Vernon G. Cardy	1-1/8 m	1:48.80	$56,600	
1955	Misty Morn	Eddie Arcaro	Jim Fitzsimmons	Wheatley Stable	1-1/8 m	1:50.60	$61,800	
1954	Evening Out	Eddie Arcaro	Jack Creevy	Jessie Sloane Widener	1-1/8 m	1:50.20	$63,000	
1953	Grecian Queen	Nick Shuk	James P. Conway	Florence Whitaker	1-1/8 m	1:51.20	$59,300	
1952	La Corredora	Ira Hanford	Carl Hanford	Marian W. O'Connor	1-1/16 m	1:46.00	$26,750	
1951	Ruddy	Ted Atkinson	John M. Gaver Sr.	Greentree Stable	1-1/16 m	1:48.00	$19,500	
1950	Siama	Eddie Arcaro	Moody Jolley	Cain Hoy Stable	1-1/16 m	1:45.20	$12,825	
1949	Adile	Eddie Arcaro	Oscar White	Sarah F. Jeffords	1-1/16 m	1:46.00	$12,425	
1948	Compliance	James Stout	George H. Strate	Lester Manor Stable	1-1/16 m	1:45.00	$11,975	
1947	First Flight	Eddie Arcaro	Sylvester Veitch	C.V. Whitney	1-1/16 m	1:46.00	$13,075	
1946	Dorothy Brown	Eric Guerin	John B. Theall	John B. Theall	1-1/16 m	1:45.20	$10,000	
1894	– 1945	Race not held						
1893	Augusta Belle	John Lamley		G. H. Kernochan	1-1/4 m	2:10.75	$3,040 †	
1892	Yorkville Belle	Isaac Burns Murphy	Matthew M. Allen	Frank A. Ehret	1-1/4 m	2:08.25	$3,710	
1891	Nellie Bly	Fred Taral		Edward J. McElmell	1-1/4 m	2:16.25	$4,260	
1890	Her Highness	Anthony Hamilton	James G. Rowe Sr.	August Belmont Sr.	1-1/4 m	2:15.00	$5,040	
1889	Senorita	Anthony Hamilton	John W. Rogers	Samuel S. Brown	1-1/4 m	2:16.50	$3,900	
1888	Los Angeles	William Hayward	Robert E. Campbell	E.J. "Lucky" Baldwin	1-1/4 m	2:15.25	$4,300	
1887	Firenze	Edward H. Garrison	Matthew Byrnes	James Ben Ali Haggin	1-1/4 m	2:12.50	$3,540	
1886	Dew Drop	Jim McLaughlin	Frank McCabe	Dwyer Brothers Stable	1-1/4 m	2:10.75	$2,690	
1885	Wanda	Harris Onley	Matthew Byrnes	Pierre Lorillard IV	1-1/4 m	2:14.25	$2,890	
1884	Duchess	William Donohue	Evert V. Snedecker	Evert V. Snedeker & Co.	1-1/4 m	2:14.00	$2,890	
1883	Miss Woodford	Jim McLaughlin	James G. Rowe Sr.	Dwyer Brothers Stable	1-1/4 m	2:20.50	$3,100	
1882	Hiawasse	Matthew Feakes	Matthew Byrnes	Pierre Lorillard IV	1-1/4 m	2:23.00	$2,790	
1881	Thora	William Donohue		Charles Reed	1-1/4 m	2:14.50	$2,790	
1880	Nancy	Lloyd Hughes		David D. Withers	1-1/4 m	2:19.25	$2,700	
1879	Ferida	Lloyd Hughes	R. Wyndham Walden	George L. Lorillard	1-1/4 m	2:16.00	$2,100	
1878	Race not held							
1877	Zoo-Zoo	William Barrett	William Pryor	Pierre Lorillard IV	1-1/2 m	2:44.25	$2,500	
1876	Patience	Matthew Feakes	Jacob Pincus	August Belmont Sr.	1-1/2 m	2:48.25	$2,700	
1875	Ascension	William Lakeland		William Cottrill	1-1/2 m	2:46.25	$2,250	
1874	Regardless	Dan Sparling	William Brown	Francis Morris	1-1/2 m	2:45.00	$2,800	
1873	Lizzie Lucas	George Barbee	Thomas W. Doswell	Thomas W. Doswell	1-1/2 m	2:45.00	$2,850	
1872	Woodbine	Floyd	Jacob Pincus	August Belmont Sr.	1-1/2 m	2:42.00	$2,450	
1871	Salina	Robert Swim		Abraham Buford	1-1/2 m	2:43.50	$1,900	

- † $ value reported is winners share of the purse from inception in 1871 thru 1893.
