= United States Hotel Stakes =

- Class: Discontinued stakes
- Location: Saratoga Race Course; Saratoga Springs, New York, United States
- Inaugurated: 1880
- Race type: Thoroughbred - Flat racing

Race information
- Distance: 6 furlongs
- Surface: Dirt
- Track: Left-handed
- Qualification: Two-year-olds
- Weight: Weight-For-Age
- Purse: Varied over the years

The United States Hotel Stakes was an American Thoroughbred horse race run annually in the late summer or early autumn until 1955 at Saratoga Race Course in Saratoga Springs, New York. It was run on dirt over a distance of six furlongs. Raced in the pre-grading era, for most of its existence the race was one of the premier shorter distance competitions for two-year-old horses in the United States.

The first running of the United States Hotel Stakes took place in 1880 and was raced for three-year-olds until 1895 when it was changed to a competition for two-year-olds. The inaugural race was won by future U.S. Racing Hall of Fame inductee, Luke Blackburn. It was so successful that in 1901 the New York Times was reporting that it was a "rich" race because it offered a purse of $10,000.

While Man o' War, who would be ranked No.1 in the Blood-Horse magazine List of the Top 100 U.S. Racehorses of the 20th Century, and other great horses in the history of American Thoroughbred racing won this race, it is also notable for two notable horses who did not. In 1929, the ensuing year's U.S. Triple Crown champion and future U.S. Racing Hall of Fame inductee Gallant Fox finished second. Whirlaway, another U.S. Triple Crown champion and future U.S. Racing Hall of Fame inductee, suffered the same fate in 1940.

The last horse to win the United States Hotel Stakes was Career Boy, a colt owned by prominent horseman Cornelius Vanderbilt Whitney who went on to be voted the American Champion Male Turf Horse for 1956. The runner-up was Canadian Champ, the 1956 Canadian Horse of the Year and Canadian Horse Racing Hall of Fame inductee.

== Records ==
Speed record (2 year olds):

- 1:06.80 @ 5.5 furlongs: Skilful (1902)
- 1:10.40 @ 6 furlongs: Air Hero (1945)

Speed record (3 year olds):

- 2:36.00 @ 12 furlongs: Hindoo (1881) & Drake Carter (1883)

Most wins by a jockey:

- 4 - Jim McLaughlin (1880, 1881, 1882, 1887)
- 4 - Eric Guerin (1946, 1950, 1953, 1954)

Most wins by a trainer:

- 6 - James G. Rowe Sr. (1881, 1882, 1907, 1908, 1909, 1915)

Most wins by an owner:

- 5 - Dwyer Brothers Stable (1881, 1882, 1886, 1887, 1888)

== Winners ==
Year	Winner	Age	Jockey	Trainer	Owner	Dist. (Miles)	Time	Win $
1955	Career Boy	2	Hedley Woodhouse	Sylvester Veitch	Cornelius Vanderbilt Whitney	6 F	1:12.40	$17,200
1954	Summer Tan	2	Eric Guerin	Sherrill W. Ward	Dorothy Bryan Firestone	6 F	1:12.60	$18,700
1953	Wise Pop	2	Eric Guerin	Stanley Hazzard	Mrs. Claude H. Johannsen Jr.	6 F	1:12.80	$19,075
1952	Tahitian King	2	Raymond York	James P. Conway	Florence D. Whitaker	6 F	1:12.80	$15,625
1951	Jet Master	2	Eddie Arcaro	George M. Odom	Marlboro Stud Farm (Joseph Eitinger)	6 F	1:12.20	$16,225
1950	Northern Star	2	Eric Guerin	James E. Ryan	Esther du Pont Weir	6 F	1:13.00	$14,275
1949	More Sun	2	Dave Gorman	Preston M. Burch	Brookmeade Stable	6 F	1:12.00	$14,500
1948	The Admiral	2	Douglas Dodson	James E. Fitzsimmons	Ogden Phipps	6 F	1:13.80	$14,400
1947	My Request	2	Eddie Arcaro	James P. Conway	Florence D. Whitaker	6 F	1:11.60	$15,375
1946	I Will	2	Eric Guerin	George M. Odom	Jacob "Jay" Paley	6 F	1:15.00	$14,275
1945	Air Hero	2	John Gilbert	John P. (Doc) Jones	Crispin Oglebay	6 F	1:10.40	$18,100
1944	Pavot	2	George Woolf	Oscar White	Walter M. Jeffords Sr.	6 F	1:12.20	$17,000
1943	Boy Knight	2	Steve Brooks	John P. (Doc) Jones	Crispin Oglebay	6 F	1:13.20	$9,275
1942	Devils Thumb	2	Conn McCreary	Cecil C. Wilhelm	William E. Boeing	6 F	1:12.80	$9,925
1941	Buster	2	Irving Anderson	Duval A. Headley	John H. Whitney	6 F	1:12.40	$9,675
1940	Attention	2	Leon Haas	Max Hirsch	Anne C. Corning	6 F	1:11.80	$11,075
1939	Flight Command	2	Raymond Workman	Sylvester Veitch	Cornelius Vanderbilt Whitney	6 F	1:13.40	$9,625
1938	El Chico	2	Nick Wall	Matthew P. Brady	William Ziegler Jr.	6 F	1:13.20	$10,300
1937	Chaps	2	Eddie DeCamillis	Hugh Dufford	Alvin Untermyer	6 F	1:14.60	$7,700
1936	Reaping Reward	2	Harry Richards	Robert V. McGarvey	Milky Way Farm	6 F	1:12.60	$8,225
1935	Postage Due	2	Sam Renick	Joseph H. Stotler	Alfred G. Vanderbilt II	6 F	1:13.20	$8,900
1934	Balladier	2	Don Meade	Herbert J. Thompson	Edward R . Bradley	6 F	1:13.00	$5,450
1933	Red Wagon	2	John Bejshak	Joseph H. Stotler	Sagamore Farm Stable	6 F	1:14.00	$6,625
1932	Ladysman	2	Bobby Jones	Bennett W. Creech	William Robertson Coe	6 F	1:12.80	$10,875
1931	Morfair	2	Frank Munden	Joseph P. (Sammy) Smith	Dorwood Stable (Victor Emanuel)	6 F	1:11.80	$11,850
1930	Jamestown	2	Linus McAtee	A. Jack Joyner	George D. Widener Jr.	6 F	1:11.60	$13,575
1929	Caruso	2	Mack Garner	Bennett W. Creech	William Robertson Coe	6 F	1:12.00	$14,000
1928	Comstockery	2	George Ellis	Thomas W. Murphy	Greentree Stable	6 F	1:13.00	$13,275
1927	Nassak	2	Laverne Fator	Samuel C. Hildreth	Rancocas Stable	6 F	1:12.40	$13,250
1926	Scapa Flow	2	Frank Coltiletti	Scott P. Harlan	Walter M. Jeffords Sr.	6 F	1:14.40	$11,525
1925	Pompey	2	Laverne Fator	William H. Karrick	Sheshone Stable	6 F	1:16.60	$10,650
1924	Sunny Man	2	Ray Carter	Joseph P. (Sammy) Smith	Willis Sharpe Kilmer	6 F	1:13.00	$10,225
1923	St. James	2	Earl Sande	A. Jack Joyner	George D. Widener Jr.	6 F	1:12.60	$13,575
1922	Martingale	2	Clarence Kummer	William M. Garth	Joshua S. Cosden	6 F	1:15.00	$10,075
1921	Morvich	2	Frank Keogh	Frederick Burlew	Benjamin Block	6 F	1:11.20	$9,075
1920	Nancy Lee	2	Frank Keogh	John H. McCormack	P. A. Clark (nom de course for William Woodward Sr.)	6 F	1:11.80	$7,900
1919	Man o' War	2	Johnny Loftus	Louis Feustel	Glen Riddle Farm	6 F	1:12.40	$7,600
1918	Billy Kelly	2	Robert Simpson	William Perkins	William Perkins & William F. Polson	6 F	1:12.40	$8,825
1917	Papp	2	Lawrence Allen	Max Hirsch	George W. Loft	6 F	1:14.40	$8,975
1916	Deer Trap	2	Everett Haynes	John Whalen	August Belmont Jr.	6 F	1:14.00	$5,850
1915	Dominant	2	Tommy McTaggart	James G. Rowe Sr.	Lewis S. Thompson	6 F	1:13.40	$3,900
1914	Garbage	2	Tommy Davies	J. Simon Healy	Edward B. Cassatt	6 F	1:12.40	$3,690
1913	Old Rosebud	2	John McCabe	Frank D. Weir	Hamilton C. Applegate	6 F	1:13.40	$2,475
1912	No races held due to the Hart–Agnew Law							
1911	No races held due to the Hart–Agnew Law							
1910	Naushon	2	James Butwell	Thomas J. Healey	Richard T. Wilson Jr.	6 F	1:14.00	$8,240
1909	Grasmere	2	Richard Scoville	James G. Rowe Sr.	James R. Keene	6 F	1:14.80	$1,200
1908	Hilarious	2	Joe Notter	James G. Rowe Sr.	James R. Keene	6 F	1:15.00	$8,250
1907	Restigouche	2	Walter Miller	James G. Rowe Sr.	James R. Keene	6 F	1:15.00	$8,250
1906	De Mund	2	Herman Radtke	John W. May	Paul J. Rainey	6 F	1:14.00	$8,790
1905	Burgomaster	2	Arthur Redfern	John W. Rogers	Harry Payne Whitney	6 F	1:13.80	$8,370
1904	Woodsaw	2	Lucien Lyne	A. Jack Joyner	Sidney Paget	5.5 F	1:09.00	$8,250
1903	Montreson	2	Arthur Redfern	Thomas J. Healey	Richard T. Wilson Jr.	5.5 F	1:12.00	$9,780
1902	Skilful	2	Frank Landry	John P. Mayberry	Charles R. Ellison	5.5 F	1:06.80	$10,480
1901	Masterman	2	John Bullman	John J. Hyland	August Belmont Jr.	5.5 F	1:08.00	$7,250
1900	Race not held							
1899	Kinley Mack	3	Henry Spencer	Peter Wimmer	Samuel E. Larabie & Augustus Eastin	8.5 F	1:54.60	$1,750
1898	George Keene	3	Tod Sloan	Thomas Welsh	Sidney Paget	9 F	1:57.00	$1,470
1897	Braw Lad	3	Willie Martin		Henry Stull	8 F	1:45.50	$900
1896	Race not held							
1895	Axiom	3	Alonzo Clayton	Frank McCabe	Philip J. Dwyer	5 F	1:02.75	$1,385
1894	Peacemaker	3	John Lamley		Goughacres Stable (B. Frank Clyde & Thomas C. Clyde)	7 F	1:29.00	$2,950
1893	Deception	3	Patrick McDermott	Walter B. Jennings	Walter B. Jennings	9 F	1:55.25	$1,450
1892	Copyright	3	E. Morris		J. C. Carr	8.5 F	1:56.50	$1,450
1891	Bermuda	3	George Anderson	Byron McClelland	Byron McClelland	12 F	2:39.00	$1,010
1890	Sinaloa	3	Shelby Barnes	Robert E. Campbell	Santa Anita Stable	12 F	2:37.50	$1,270
1889	Retrieve	3	Isaac E. Lewis	John McGinty	Labold Bros. (Alexander S. & Isaac H. Labold)	12 F	2:38.50	$1,330
1888	Ballston	3	John P. Neumeyer	Frank McCabe	Dwyer Brothers Stable	12 F	2:40.00	$1,350
1887	Hanover	3	Jim McLaughlin	Frank McCabe	Dwyer Brothers Stable	12 F	2:38.50	$1,850
1886	Inspector B	3	William Fitzpatrick	Frank McCabe	Dwyer Brothers Stable	12 F	2:42.75	$1,750
1885	Favor	3	John Spellman	Green B. Morris	Green B. Morris & James D. Patton	12 F	2:40.00	$1,500
1884	Kosciusko	3	John Stoval		Sanford T. Haydon & John N. Barry	12 F	2:40.50	$1,500
1883	Drake Carter	3	John Spellman	Green B. Morris	Green B. Morris & James D. Patton	12 F	2:36.00	$1,600
1882	Frankie B.	3	Jim McLaughlin	James G. Rowe Sr.	Dwyer Brothers Stable	12 F	2:40.50	$2,100
1881	Hindoo	3	Jim McLaughlin	James G. Rowe Sr.	Dwyer Brothers Stable	12 F	2:36.00	$2,900
1880	Luke Blackburn	3	Jim McLaughlin	Capt. Jim Williams	Capt. Jim Williams	12 F	2:41.00	$1,800
