= Luke Blackburn (horse) =

American-bred Thoroughbred racehorse

- Sire: Bonnie Scotland
- Grandsire: Iago
- Dam: Nevada
- Damsire: Lexington
- Sex: Stallion
- Foaled: 1877
- Country: United States
- Color: Bay
- Breeder: Capt. James Franklin
- Owner: S. L. Wartzfelder; Capt. Jim Williams at 2 Dwyer Brothers Stable at 3
- Trainer: Capt. Jim Williams at 2 James G. Rowe Sr.
- Record: 39 Starts: 25-6-2
- Earnings: $49,460

Major wins
- Champion Stakes (1880); Coney Island Handicap (1880); Kenner Stakes (1880); Grand Union Prize (1880); Tidal Stakes (1880); United States Hotel Stakes (1880)

Honors
- U.S. Racing Hall of Fame (1956)
- Last updated on December 17, 2007

Luke Blackburn (1877–1904) was a thoroughbred race horse born and bred in Tennessee by Capt. James Franklin. He was inducted into the US Horse Racing Hall of Fame in 1956.

== Background ==
Sired by Bonnie Scotland, his dam was Nevada by perhaps the most influential stallion America ever produced, the great Lexington. A bay foal, he was sold at two to Capt. Jim Williams who paid $510 for him. Just over a decade since the American Civil War, only former officers could afford racehorses, hence the copious amount of captains associated with the horse.

Williams named the colt for Luke P. Blackburn, the governor of the state of Kentucky at the time, and he proceeded to race him thirteen times. Luke won twice. When the horse turned three, Capt. Williams sold him to the Dwyer Brothers for $2,500, and the Dwyer Brothers placed him in the hands of the future Hall of Fame trainer, James G. Rowe Sr.

== Racing career ==
During his first start at three, Luke lost again (to a colt named Fonso who would win the Kentucky Derby that year), but he then won twenty three of his next twenty four races, and he won them by six lengths or ten lengths or even fifteen, breaking records as he did. When his jockeys rode him, they complained that Luke Blackburn was too strong and pulled too hard. Sports writers wrote that he was the most muscular horse in America although he stood only 15 and a quarter hands high.

The famous Hall of Fame jockey, Jim McLaughlin, said Luke could not be held back. He also said he was the best horse he had ever ridden. McLaughlin had the mount on Hindoo, Hanover, Miss Woodford, Firenze, Kingston, George Kinney, Tremont, Tecumseh and Salvator.

In his final start as a three-year-old, Luke was injured, but he came back to the races at four. After two races, he was retired. The injury had proved the end of his days on the track.

During one of his races, Luke Blackburne set a record for 1 ½ Miles at 2:34 flat.

== Stud career ==
Luke Blackburn was sent to General William Hicks Jackson's Belle Meade Stud near Nashville, Tennessee. One horse he produced was Proctor Knott, the only horse Salvator could never beat.

In 1904, at the age of twenty seven, Luke Blackburn was sold at auction for $20 to a W.H. Allison. He died within months.
