= Jim McLaughlin (jockey) =

American jockey (1861–1927)

Personal information
- Born: February 12, 1861 Hartford, Connecticut, United States
- Died: January 19, 1927 (aged 65) New Orleans, Louisiana, United States
- Occupation: Jockey / Trainer

Horse racing career
- Sport: Horse racing

Major racing wins
- Kentucky Oaks (1880); Champagne Stakes (1880, 1884); Champion Stakes (1880, 1881, 1884, 1887); Clark Handicap (1880, 1881, 1882); Tidal Stakes (1880, 1881, 1882, 1883, 1885, 1886, 1887, 1889); Coney Island Derby (1881, 1882, 1885, 1887); Juvenile Stakes (1881, 1885, 1886, 1887); Travers Stakes (1881, 1883, 1886, 1888); Flash Stakes (1882, 1883, 1886); Jerome Handicap (1882); Alabama Stakes (1883, 1886, 1888); Ladies Handicap (1883, 1885, 1886, 1888); Monmouth Oaks (1883, 1886); Monmouth Handicap (1885); June Stakes (1886); Spring Stakes (1886, 1888); Zephyr Stakes (1886, 1887); Tremont Stakes (1888); Lawrence Realization Stakes (1889); Futurity Stakes (1891) American Classic Race wins: Kentucky Derby (1881); Preakness Stakes (1885); Belmont Stakes (1882, 1883, 1884, 1886, 1887, 1888) As a trainer: Brighton Handicap (1900); Empire City Handicap (1900); Long Island Handicap (1900); Dolphin Stakes (1903); Metropolitan Handicap (1905); Invincible Handicap (1910)

Racing awards
- United States Champion Jockey by wins (1884, 1885, 1886, 1887)

Honours
- United States Racing Hall of Fame (1955)

Significant horses
- Hindoo, Hanover, Luke Blackburn, Kingston; Sir Dixon, Firenze, George Kinney; Panique, Tremont, Tecumseh, Miss Woodford
- Updated on December 17, 2007

James A. McLaughlin (February 12, 1861 - January 19, 1927) was an American National Champion jockey in Thoroughbred racing and a Hall of Fame inductee.

Orphaned and homeless in his early teens, McLaughlin was taken in by horse trainer "Father Bill" Daly who taught him how to ride. Daly's 1931 Brooklyn Daily Eagle obituary was headlined as someone who "Developed Many Great Jockeys." While individual statistics from all of McLaughlin's career races aren't documented, McLaughlin began his career riding in Tennessee in the late 1870s. Records show that he first competed in the Kentucky Derby in 1880 for the Dwyer Brothers Stable with trainer James G. Rowe Sr. The following year the team won the race on the future Hall of Fame horse, Hindoo. McLaughlin finished second in the 1882 Derby and fifth in 1884.

The horse he claimed was the best he'd ever ridden was Luke Blackburn.

Jim McLaughlin won the 1885 Preakness Stakes riding Tecumseh but finished third with the horse in the Belmont Stakes. He rode three consecutive Belmont Stakes winners on two separate occasions, claiming victory six out of seven years. He won the race in 1882, 1883, and 1884 then finished third in 1885 and won then next three in 1886, 1887, and 1888. The last five of his Belmont winners were all for the Dwyer Brothers. McLaughlin's six Belmont wins still stands as the most for any jockey and is shared with Eddie Arcaro who won his sixth in 1955.

McLaughlin won more races than any jockey in the United States four consecutive times from 1884 through 1887. He rode in his last races in 1892 after which he worked for a time as a trainer and as a racetrack official.

Jim McLaughlin died in 1927 a few weeks short of his sixty-sixth birthday. On its formation in 1955, he was posthumously inducted in the National Museum of Racing and Hall of Fame.
