= Freehold Stakes =

- Class: Discontinued stakes
- Location: Long Branch Racetrack; Long Branch, New Jersey, United States
- Inaugurated: 1882
- Race type: Thoroughbred - Flat racing
- Website: n/a

Race information
- Distance: 1 1/2 miles (12 furlongs)
- Surface: Dirt
- Track: left-handed
- Qualification: All ages
- Weight: Assigned

The Freehold Stakes was an American Thoroughbred horse race run annually in early August at the Monmouth Park Association's racetrack in Long Branch, New Jersey. Inaugurated in 1879, the Champion Stakes was open to horses of any age and was raced on dirt over a distance of one and one half miles (12 furlongs).

In 1891, the races at Long Branch had to be shifted to racetracks in New York when government legislation attempted to inhibit parimutuel wagering. The races were split between the Jerome Park Racetrack in Fordham, Bronx and at the nearby Morris Park Racecourse at Westchester Village. The Monmouth Park Racing Association closed and the land sold after its operating license was revoked in 1893 and government legislation was enacted that banned parimutuel wagering.

== Records ==
Speed record:

- 2:33.25 - Firenze (1890)

Most wins:

- 3 - Firenze (1888, 1889, 1890)

Most wins by a jockey:

- 3 - William Donohue (1882, 1883, 1884)

Most wins by a trainer:

- 3 - Evert V. Snedecker (1882, 1883, 1884)
- 3 - Matthew Byrnes (1888, 1889, 1890)
- 3 - John Huggins (1886, 1887, 1892)

Most wins by an owner:

- 3 - James Ben Ali Haggin (1888, 1889, 1890)

== Winners ==
Year	Winner	Age	Jockey	Trainer	Owner	Dist. (Miles)	Time
1892	Locohatchee †	3	Marty Bergen	John Huggins	Rancocas Stable	11/2	2:38.00
1891	Raceland	6	Anthony Hamilton	Hardy Campbell, Jr.	Michael F. Dwyer	11/2	2:37.75
1890	Firenze	6	Isaac Burns Murphy	Matthew Byrnes	James Ben Ali Haggin	11/2	2:33.25
1889	Firenze	5	George Taylor	Matthew Byrnes	James Ben Ali Haggin	11/2	Walkover
1888	Firenze	4	Edward H. Garrison	Matthew Byrnes	James Ben Ali Haggin	11/2	2:34.00
1887	The Bard	4	William Hayward	John Huggins	Alexander Cassatt	11/2	2:39.75
1886	The Bard	3	Sam H. Fisher	John Huggins	Alexander Cassatt	11/2	2:45.50
1885	Miss Woodford	5	Jim McLaughlin	Frank McCabe	Dwyer Brothers Stable	11/2	2:45.50
1884	Eole	6	William Donohue	Evert V. Snedecker	Frederick Gebhard	11/2	2:44.50
1883	Eole	5	William Donohue	Evert V. Snedecker	Frederick Gebhard	11/2	2:36.00
1882	Giroflé	5	William Donohue	Evert V. Snedecker	E. V. Snedeker & Co.	11/2	2:42.00

* † In 1892, Banquet won but was disqualified for interference and set back to last.
