= The Bard (American horse) =

American-bred Thoroughbred racehorse

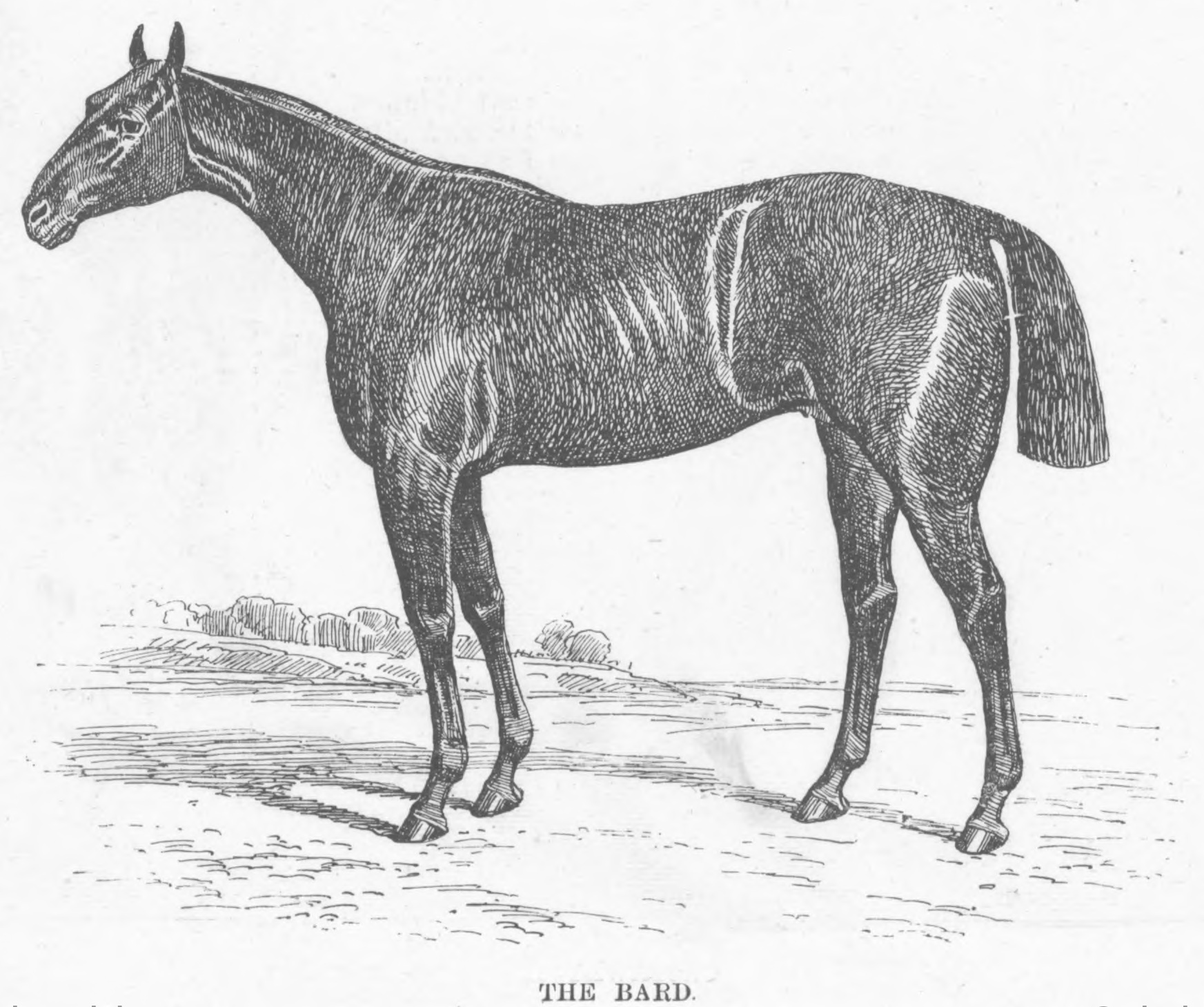
- Harper's Weekly (May 31, 1890)
- Sire: Longfellow
- Grandsire: Leamington
- Dam: Bradamante
- Damsire: War Dance
- Sex: Stallion
- Foaled: 1883
- Country: United States
- Colour: Bay
- Breeder: Charles Reed
- Owner: Alexander J. Cassatt
- Trainer: John Huggins
- Record: 47: 27–9–4
- Earnings: US$84,990

Major wins
- Red Bank Stakes (1885); Bouquet Stakes (1885); Capital Stakes (1885); Omnibus Stakes (1886); Barnegat Stakes (1886); Spindrift Stakes (1886); Dixie Handicap (1886); Freehold Stakes (1886, 1887); September Stakes (1886); Jerome Handicap (1886); Coney Island Stakes (1887); St. James Hotel Stakes (1887, 1888); Brooklyn Handicap (1888); Brooklyn Cup (1888) American Classics wins: Preakness Stakes (1886)

Awards
- Thoroughbred Heritage Champions: American Co-Champion Three-Year-Old Colt (1886); American Co-Champion Older Male Horse (1887, 1888)
- Last updated on April 12, 2020

The Bard (1883–1907) was an American Champion Thoroughbred racehorse. He was the most popular horse of his day and one who raced and beat many leading American horses. His biggest win was the 1886 Preakness Stakes.

== Background ==
Bred by Charles Reed, owner of the Fairview Stud Farm in Gallatin, Tennessee, his dam was Bradamante and his sire was the U.S. Racing Hall of Fame inductee, Longfellow, who was the Leading sire in North America in 1891. The Bard was purchased and raced by Alexander Cassatt, President of the Pennsylvania Railroad, and, in racing, the owner of Chesterbrook Farm in Berwyn, Pennsylvania and President of Monmouth Park Racetrack. He was trained by John Huggins.

== Racing career ==
The Bard raced at age two in 1885, notably winning the Red Bank Stakes at Monmouth Park, the Bouquet Stakes at Sheepshead Bay Race Track, and the Capital Stakes at the Ivy City Racetrack in Washington, D.C.

As a three-year-old, The Bard developed into a top competitor. In the pre-United States Triple Crown era, he won the 1886 Preakness Stakes and finished second in the Belmont Stakes. The following year, The Bard's performances led to his being recognized as the best Older Male in America in 1887, despite missing much of the second half of the year with a life-threatening illness. His popularity at the time was such that regular bulletins of his condition were released and published by major newspapers across the country.

Recovered from his illness, The Bard returned to dominate American racing in the first half of 1888. In a much anticipated event, on May 15 he defeated Hanover to win the 1888 Brooklyn Handicap. Eleven days later on May 26, The Bard met Hanover again in the 1½ mile Brooklyn Cup at Gravesend Race Track on Coney Island.The field also included Lucky Baldwin's highly regarded California colt, Volante. The following day's New York Times headline was "The Bard Wins The Cup; He Is America's Greatest Race Horse". The Bard lost his only race of 1888 when he injured a hind leg in the August 2, 1888, Freehold Stakes, which was won by Firenze at Long Branch Racetrack. On April 4, 1889, the New York Times reported that: "The Bard may not be seen on the turf again this year, owing to the trouble with his leg, which caused him to stop racing suddenly last year." Although his owner hoped he might recover in time to compete in the Brooklyn Derby and Suburban Handicap, the injury was serious enough that he would never race again.

From 1885 through 1888, The Bard won 27 races and earned $84,990.

== Stud career ==
On May 16, 1889 the Times again wrote that The Bard had still not raced and later reports show him standing at stud at his owner's Pennsylvania breeding farm.

The mainstay of Alexander Cassat's horse breeding operation, and after his death in 1906, for his son Edward, The Bard sired a number of successful runners including Gold Heels, the 1902 American Champion Older Male Horse, and the filly, Poetess, winner of the 1897 Alabama Stakes.

The Bard died in 1907.

== Pedigree ==
Pedigree of The Bard
Sire Longfellow	Leamington	Faugh-a-Ballagh	Sir Hercules*
Sire Longfellow	Leamington	Faugh-a-Ballagh	Guiccioli*
Sire Longfellow	Leamington	Pantaloon Mare	Pantaloon
Sire Longfellow	Leamington	Pantaloon Mare	Daphne
Sire Longfellow	Nantura	Brawner's Eclipse	American Eclipse
Sire Longfellow	Nantura	Brawner's Eclipse	Henry Mare
Sire Longfellow	Nantura	Quix	Bertrand
Sire Longfellow	Nantura	Quix	Lady Fortune
Dam Bradamante	War Dance	Lexington	Boston
Dam Bradamante	War Dance	Lexington	Alice Carneal
Dam Bradamante	War Dance	Reel	Glencoe
Dam Bradamante	War Dance	Reel	Gallopade
Dam Bradamante	Brenna	Knight of St. George	Birdcatcher*
Dam Bradamante	Brenna	Knight of St. George	Maltese
Dam Bradamante	Brenna	Levity	Trustee
Dam Bradamante	Brenna	Levity	Tranby Mare

* The Bard is inbred 4S x 5D to the stallion Sir Hercules, meaning that he appears fourth generation on the sire side of his pedigree, and fifth generation (via Birdcatcher) on the dam side of his pedigree.

* The Bard is inbred 4S x 5D to the mare Guiccioli, meaning that she appears fourth generation on the sire side of his pedigree, and fifth generation (via Birdcatcher) on the dam side of his pedigree.
