= Isaac Burns Murphy =

American jockey (1861–1896)

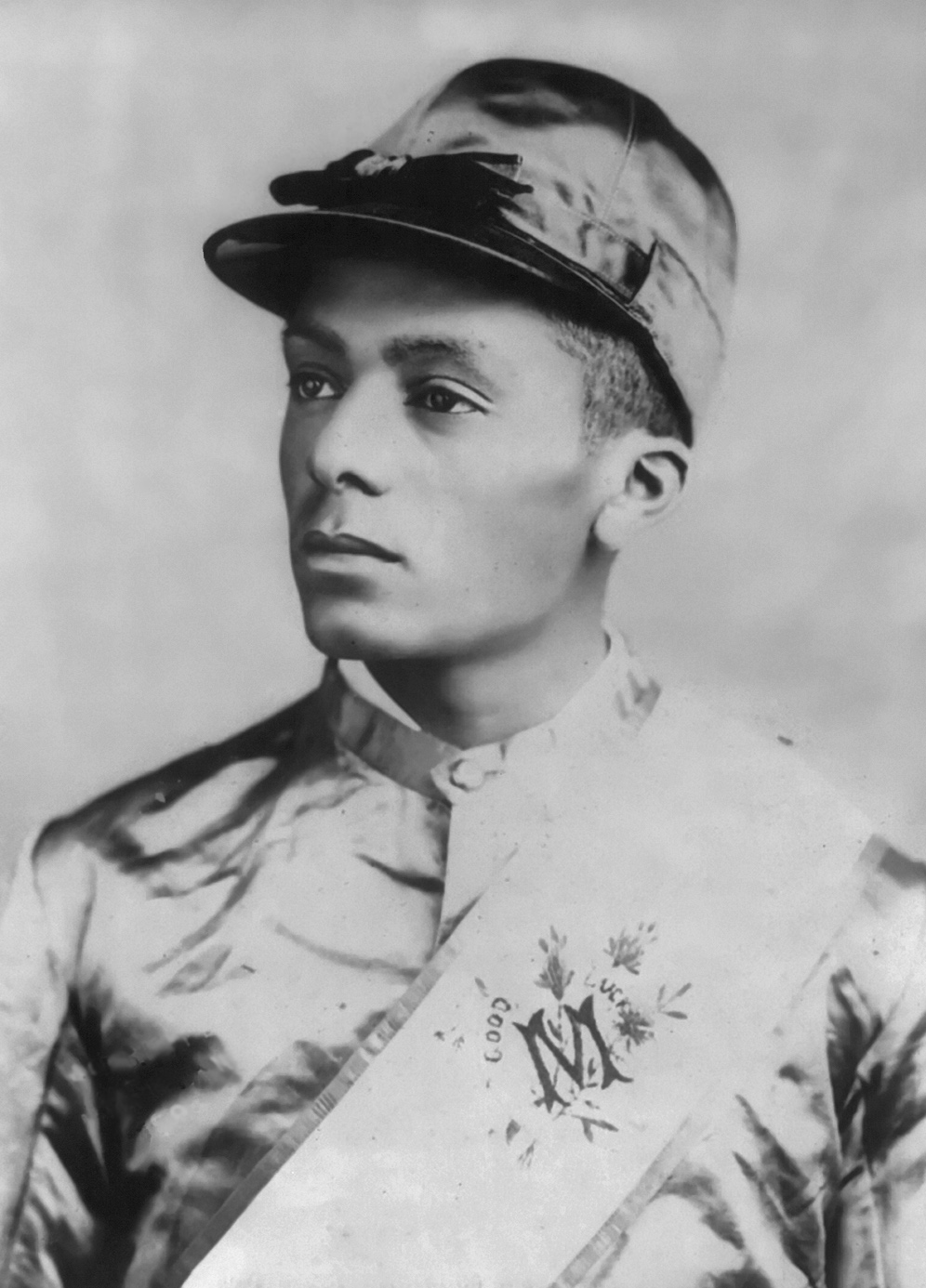
- Murphy, c.1885

Personal information
- Born: January 6, 1861 Clark County, Kentucky, U.S.
- Died: February 16, 1896 (aged 35) Lexington, Kentucky, U.S.
- Resting place: The Kentucky Horse Park
- Occupation: Jockey

Horse racing career
- Sport: Horse racing

Major racing wins
- Clark Handicap (1879, 1884, 1885, 1890); Travers Stakes (1879); Saratoga Cup (1881, 1886); Latonia Derby (1883, 1884, 1885, 1886, 1891); American Derby (1884, 1885, 1886, 1888); Illinois Derby (1884); Kentucky Oaks (1884); Alabama Stakes (1885, 1889); Champion Stakes (1886, 1890); First Special Stakes (1887, 1888, 1889); Brooklyn Derby (1888); Foam Stakes (1888); Second Special Stakes (1888); Jerome Handicap (1889); Freehold Stakes (1890); Suburban Handicap (1890); Tidal Stakes (1890); Gazelle Handicap (1892); Mermaid Stakes (1892) American Classic Race wins: Kentucky Derby (1884, 1890, 1891)

Honours
- United States Racing Hall of Fame (1955); Isaac Murphy Award; Isaac Murphy Handicap at Arlington Park

Significant horses
- Buchanan, Emperor of Norfolk, Falsetto, Firenze, Kingman, Kingston, Leonatus, Riley, Salvator, Silver Cloud

Isaac Burns Murphy (January 6, 1861 – February 16, 1896) was an American Hall of Fame jockey, considered one of the greatest riders in American Thoroughbred horse racing history. He won three runnings of the Kentucky Derby and was the first jockey to be inducted into the National Museum of Racing and Hall of Fame at its creation in 1955.

== Biography ==
=== Early life ===
Isaac Burns Murphy was born into slavery on January 6, 1861, in Clark County, Kentucky. The only surviving evidence of his birth is recorded in the property ledger of David Tanner, the owner of the farm where Isaac's mother America was enslaved. On June 24, 1864, Isaac's father Jerry Burns enlisted in the Union Army. He died in the fall of that year in the hospital at Camp Nelson near Lexington, succumbing to an unknown infectious disease. Murphy's mother America moved with her family to Lexington sometime after.

In 1867, America and Isaac moved in with family friend Eli Jordan, a man who would become one of the most important figures in Isaac's life. Eli was a prominent horse trainer who worked for the Williams and Owings stables and, according to historian Pellom McDaniels: "Isaac may have been the son Eli never had, and he impressed on the boy his definition of manhood, the importance of prudence and honesty, and the benefits of being consistent in all things."

Murphy began his racing career riding for Williams and Owings stables in 1875 at the age of 14. What followed was one of the most illustrious careers in the history of the sport, during which Murphy became one of the highest paid athletes and among the most famous black men in America. Murphy rode in eleven Kentucky Derbies, winning three times: on Buchanan in 1884, Riley in 1890, and Kingman in 1891. Kingman was owned by Jacobin Stables (co-owners, Preston Kinzea Stone and Dudley Allen) and trained by Dudley Allen, and was the first horse co-owned by an African American to win the Derby. Murphy is the only jockey to have won the Kentucky Derby, the Kentucky Oaks, and the Clark Handicap in the same year (1884).

=== Salvator vs. Tenny ===
Among the most famous races of Murphy's career was a match race at Sheepshead Bay on June 25, 1890. At the height of his career, Murphy rode Salvator to a dead-heat victory over Tenny and his rival jockey Edward "Snapper" Garrison. The race was considered to be one of the most thrilling races of all time, in which the most dominant black jockey squared off against one of the most dominant white jockeys, head-to-head. The race is also notable for being credited with the first instance of a "photo finish", which was taken by photographer John C. Hemment.

=== Poisoning controversy ===
On August 26, 1890, at the Monmouth Handicap, Murphy fell off his horse Firenzi after crossing the finish line in last place. Given that Murphy and Firenzi had been the presumed favorites, along with long-standing rumors about Murphy's ritual of drinking champagne before races, stories began to circulate that he had been racing drunk. Following the incident, he was suspended from racing pending an investigation.

Murphy strongly refuted the claim, maintaining that he had been drugged. Given his longstanding reputation as a clean rider, some members of the press defended the jockey and called the accusations unfounded. Further adding to the scandal, it was found that bettors had uncharacteristically wagered heavily against Firenzi, betting instead on William Lakeland's Tea Tray as the race drew near. Among those betting on Tea Tray was notable race "plunger" Dave Johnson, who had lost $25,000 (more than $750,000, adjusted for inflation) betting against Murphy on Salvator earlier that year.

For the rest of his life, Murphy maintained that he had been poisoned and, although he would race again, the accusation of drunkenness tainted the rest of his career.

=== Death and legacy ===
Murphy died of heart failure on February 16, 1896, in Lexington, Kentucky. While his funeral was attended by more than 500 members of the community, over time, his unmarked grave in African Cemetery No. 2 was forgotten. During the 1960s, Frank B. Borries Jr., a University of Kentucky press specialist, spent three years searching for the grave site and in 1967, Murphy was reinterred at the old Man o' War burial site. With the building of the Kentucky Horse Park, his remains were moved to be buried again next to Man o' War at the entrance to the park.

According to his own calculations, Murphy won 628 of his 1,412 starts—a 44% victory rate that has never been equaled, and a record about which Hall of Fame jockey Eddie Arcaro said: "There is no chance that his record of winning will ever be surpassed." By a later calculation of incomplete records, his record stands at 530 wins in 1,538 rides, which still makes his win rate 34%.

In 1955, Murphy was inducted into the Jockey's Hall of Fame at Saratoga, New York. In 1940, he was honored with one of the 33 dioramas featured at the American Negro Exposition in Chicago. Since 1995, the National Turf Writers Association has given the Isaac Murphy Award to the jockey with the highest winning percentage for the year in North American racing (from a minimum of 500 mounts).

== Additional resources ==
- Mooney, Katherine C. (2023).Isaac Murphy: The Rise and Fall of a Black Jockey. Yale University Press. ISBN 978-0300254426.
