= Champion Stakes (disambiguation) =

The Champion Stakes is a horse race run at Ascot Racecourse in England.

Champion Stakes may also refer to:

- Champion Stakes (United States), a horse race run at Long Branch racetrack from 1879 to 1892
- Champion Stakes (English greyhound race), a greyhound race run at Romford Stadium
- Champion Stakes (Irish greyhound race), a greyhound race run at Shelbourne Park
- Irish Champion Stakes, a horse race run at Leopardstown Racecourse
- Champions Stakes (VRC), a horse race run at Flemington Racecourse, previously known as the LKS Mackinnon Stakes
