= Eole (horse) =

American-bred Thoroughbred racehorse

- Sire: Eolus
- Grandsire: Leamington
- Dam: War Song
- Damsire: War Dance
- Sex: Stallion
- Foaled: 1878
- Country: United States
- Colour: Bay
- Breeder: Ellerslie Stud (Richard J. Hancock)
- Owner: Frederick Gebhard
- Trainer: Evert V. Snedecker
- Record: 67: 27–17–9
- Earnings: US$55,162

Major wins
- Monmouth Cup (1882); Great Metropolitan Stakes (1882); Jockey Club Handicap (1882); Champion Stakes (1882); Morrissey Stakes (1882); Autumn Cup Handicap (1882, 1883); Freehold Stakes (1883, 1884); Coney Island Cup (1883); Stirrup Cup (1883); Navesink Handicap (1883); Monmouth Stakes (1883); Long Island Stakes (1883); Kearney Stakes (1887)

Awards
- American Champion Older Male Horse (1883)

Eole (1878–1888) was an American Thoroughbred Champion racehorse who was one of the last of the great long-distance runners.

Eole was bred by at Ellerslie Stud in Albemarle County, Virginia by owner Richard J. Hancock, the father of Arthur B. Hancock who later founded Claiborne Farm in Kentucky. Unraced at age two, Eole was then purchased by Frederick Gebhard and raced at age three. (Note: Ownership of Eole was disputed by Arthur Middleton Hunter. The dispute went to arbitration and found in Gebhard's favour, although he had to pay $3500 in consideration of Hunter's care and management of the horse during the 1882 season.)

Conditioned for racing by Evert Snedecker, in 1881 Eole's best major race results were second-place finishes in the Dixie Stakes, Gravesend Handicap and in the Classic, Belmont Stakes. At age four, Eole was one of the top long-distance runners in the United States, winning the Champion Stakes and the Great Metropolitan Stakes at 1½ miles, the Jockey Club Handicap at 2 miles, the Monmouth Cup at 2¼ miles, and the Autumn Cup at 3 miles at Sheepshead Bay Race Track.

== 1883 Championship year ==
At age five, Eole's wins included the first of his two consecutive victories in the 1½ mile Freehold Stakes at the Monmouth Park Association's Long Branch Racetrack and his second straight win of the 3 mile Autumn Cup. Eole's performances that year earned him retrospective American Champion Older Male Horse honors from Thoroughbred Heritage.

At age six in 1884, Eole won his second edition of the Freehold Stakes and in 1885 was sent to race in England where he ran second in the prestigious 2½ mile Ascot Gold Cup to Epsom Derby winner, St. Gatien. For 1886, Eole returned home to the United States where he raced through age nine, notably winning the 1887 Kearney Stakes at Saratoga Race Course.

Retired to stud duty for the 1888 season, on August 13 Eole was being shipped aboard an Erie Railroad express train from New York City bound for Chicago when it derailed at Shohola, Pennsylvania at 1:40 in the morning. The railcar filled with horses rolled down an 80 foot embankment and burst into flames. One person died in the fire along with Eole and fourteen other horses belonging to Frederick Gebhard and his companion, the actress Lillie Langtry. . One of the horses to survive the disaster was St Saviour, full brother to Eole.

== Pedigree ==
Pedigree of Eole
Sire Eolus	Leamington	Faugh-a-Ballagh	Sir Hercules*
Sire Eolus	Leamington	Faugh-a-Ballagh	Guiccioli*
Sire Eolus	Leamington	Pantaloon mare	Pantaloon
Sire Eolus	Leamington	Pantaloon mare	Daphne
Sire Eolus	Fanny Washington	Revenue	Trustee
Sire Eolus	Fanny Washington	Revenue	Rosalie Somers
Sire Eolus	Fanny Washington	Sarah Washington	Garrisons Zinganee
Sire Eolus	Fanny Washington	Sarah Washington	Stella
Dam War Song	War Dance	Lexington	Boston
Dam War Song	War Dance	Lexington	Alice Carneal
Dam War Song	War Dance	Reel	Glencoe
Dam War Song	War Dance	Reel	Gallopade
Dam War Song	Eliza Davis	Knight of St. George	Birdcatcher*
Dam War Song	Eliza Davis	Knight of St. George	Maltese
Dam War Song	Eliza Davis	Melrose	Melbourne
Dam War Song	Eliza Davis	Melrose	Clarkia

* Eole is inbred 4S x 5D to the stallion Sir Hercules, meaning that he appears fourth generation on the sire side of his pedigree, and fifth generation (via Birdcatcher) on the dam side of his pedigree.

* Eole is inbred 4S x 5D to the mare Guiccioli, meaning that she appears fourth generation on the sire side of his pedigree, and fifth generation (via Birdcatcher) on the dam side of his pedigree.
