= Wise Counsellor =

- Sire: Mentor
- Grandsire: Blackstock
- Dam: Rustle
- Damsire: Russell
- Sex: Stallion
- Foaled: 1921
- Country: United States
- Color: Chestnut
- Breeder: Spring Valley Stud (S. Kenney Nichols)
- Owner: Thomas C. Bradley; Frederick A. Burton (Oct., 1923)
- Trainer: Auval John Baker; John S. Ward
- Record: 22: 10-3-4
- Earnings: US$115,570

Major wins
- Cincinnati Trophy Stakes (1923); Harold Stakes (1923); Kentucky Jockey Club Stakes (1923); Queen City Handicap (1923); International Special No.1 (1924); Laurel Handicap (1924); Capital Handicap (1925); Jennings Handicap (1925)

Awards
- American Champion Two-Year-Old Male Horse (1923)

Wise Counsellor (1921–1942) was the American National Champion two-year-old of Thoroughbred racing in 1923. He is best remembered for his win at age three over the European star runner Épinard in the first of a three-race series in 1924 known as the International Special, each hosted by a different racetrack in the United States.

== Sire line tree ==
- Wise Counsellor
  - Good Advice
  - Supreme Court
  - Deliberator
    - Air Rate
  - Barre Granite

== Pedigree ==
Pedigree of Wise Counsellor, chestnut colt, 1921
Sire Mentor	Blackstock	Hanover	Hindoo
Sire Mentor	Blackstock	Hanover	Bourbon Belle
Sire Mentor	Blackstock	Mannie Himyar	Himyar
Sire Mentor	Blackstock	Mannie Himyar	Mannie Gray
Sire Mentor	Meta	Onondaga	Leamington*
Sire Mentor	Meta	Onondaga	Susan Beane
Sire Mentor	Meta	Una	War Dance
Sire Mentor	Meta	Una	Georgia Wood
Dam Rustle	Russell	Eolus	Leamington*
Dam Rustle	Russell	Eolus	Fanny Washington
Dam Rustle	Russell	Tillie Russell	Scathelock
Dam Rustle	Russell	Tillie Russell	Daisy
Dam Rustle	Lady Louise	Iroquois	Leamington*
Dam Rustle	Lady Louise	Iroquois	Maggie B B
Dam Rustle	Lady Louise	Tarantula	Great Tom
Dam Rustle	Lady Louise	Tarantula	Tallulah (family: 4-r)

* Wise Counsellor is inbred 4S x 4D x 4D to the stallion Leamington, meaning that he appears fourth generation once on the sire side of his pedigree and fourth generation twice on the dam side of his pedigree.
