= Ramon Domínguez =

Venezuelan jockey (born 1976)

Ramón Domínguez
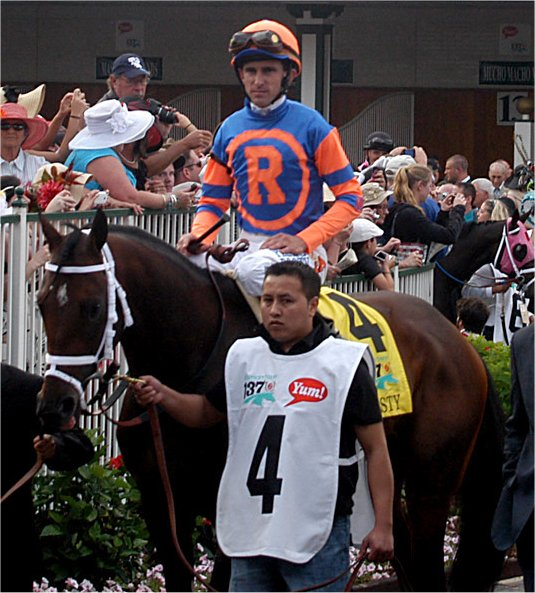
- Ramón Dominguez on Stay Thirsty, 2011 Kentucky Derby

Personal information
- Born: November 24, 1976 (age 46) Caracas, Venezuela
- Occupation: Jockey

Horse racing career
- Sport: Horse racing
- Career wins: 4,985

Major racing wins
- Hirsch Jacobs Stakes (2002, 2003, 2004); Dixie Stakes (2003, 2004, 2006, 2007, 2010); Sword Dancer Invitational (2004); Wood Memorial Stakes (2004); United Nations Handicap (2005); Man O' War Stakes (2005, 2009, 2010); Louisiana Derby (2005); Pimlico Special (2006); Sky Classic Stakes (2006); Gallant Fox Handicap (2006); Oceanport Stakes (2006); Toboggan Handicap (2007, 2011); Gotham Stakes (2007, 2011, 2012); Manhattan Handicap (2007, 2012); Clark Handicap (2007); Damon Runyon Stakes (2007, 2008, 2009); Bourbon Stakes (2007); Busanda Stakes (2008, 2011); Victory Ride Stakes (2008); Beldame Stakes (2007, 2008, 2011); Remsen Stakes (2008, 2012); Matriarch Stakes (2008); Hollywood Derby (2008); Frank E. Kilroe Mile Handicap (2009); Shuvee Handicap (2009); True North Handicap (2009); Ogden Phipps Handicap (2009); Arlington Million (2009, 2012); Alfred G. Vanderbilt Handicap (2009); Sleepy Hollow Stakes (2009, 2010); Empire Classic Handicap (2009, 2011); Suburban Handicap (2010); Hopeful Stakes (2010); Garden City Stakes (2010, 2012); Jockey Club Gold Cup (2010); Shadwell Turf Mile Stakes (2010, 2011); Tom Fool Handicap (2011); Apple Blossom Handicap (2011); Turf Classic Stakes (2011); Woody Stephens Stakes (2011); Peter Pan Stakes (2011); Beverly D. Stakes (2011); Woodward Stakes (2011); Spinaway Stakes (2011); Flower Bowl Invitational Stakes (2011); Spinster Stakes (2011); Gulfstream Park Turf Handicap (2012); Gulfstream Park Handicap (2012); Sunshine Millions Classic (2012); Just A Game Stakes (2012); Brooklyn Handicap (2012); Sheepshead Bay Handicap (2012); Jim Dandy Stakes (2012); Ballston Spa Handicap (2012); Travers Stakes (2012); Nearctic Stakes (2012); Cigar Mile Handicap (2012); Gazelle Stakes (2012); Classics & Breeders' Cup; Breeders' Cup Turf (2004, 2012); Breeders' Cup Juvenile (2011)

Racing awards
- United States Champion Jockey by wins (2001, 2003); Isaac Murphy Award (2004); Eclipse Award (2010, 2011, 2012); George Woolf Memorial Jockey Award (2012); Mike Venezia Award (2013)

Honours
- National Museum of Racing and Hall of Fame inductee (2016)

Significant horses
- Phi Beta Doc, Better Talk Now, Bluegrass Cat, Invasor, Gio Ponti, Havre de Grace, Mucho Macho Man, Little Mike, Hansen (horse), Fabulous Strike, Tapit

Ramón A. Domínguez (born November 24, 1976) is a retired Venezuelan jockey and Hall of Fame member in American thoroughbred horse racing.

== Career ==
Domínguez began riding horses at age 16 in his native Venezuela in show jumping then turned to riding thoroughbreds in flat racing events at La Rinconada Hippodrome. He emigrated to the United States where he began riding at Florida's Hialeah Park Race Track in 1996.

In 2001 he got his big break by becoming the winningest jockey in the United States. He repeated the feat in 2003, and in 2004 he won the Isaac Murphy Award for having the highest winning percentage among all American-based jockeys.

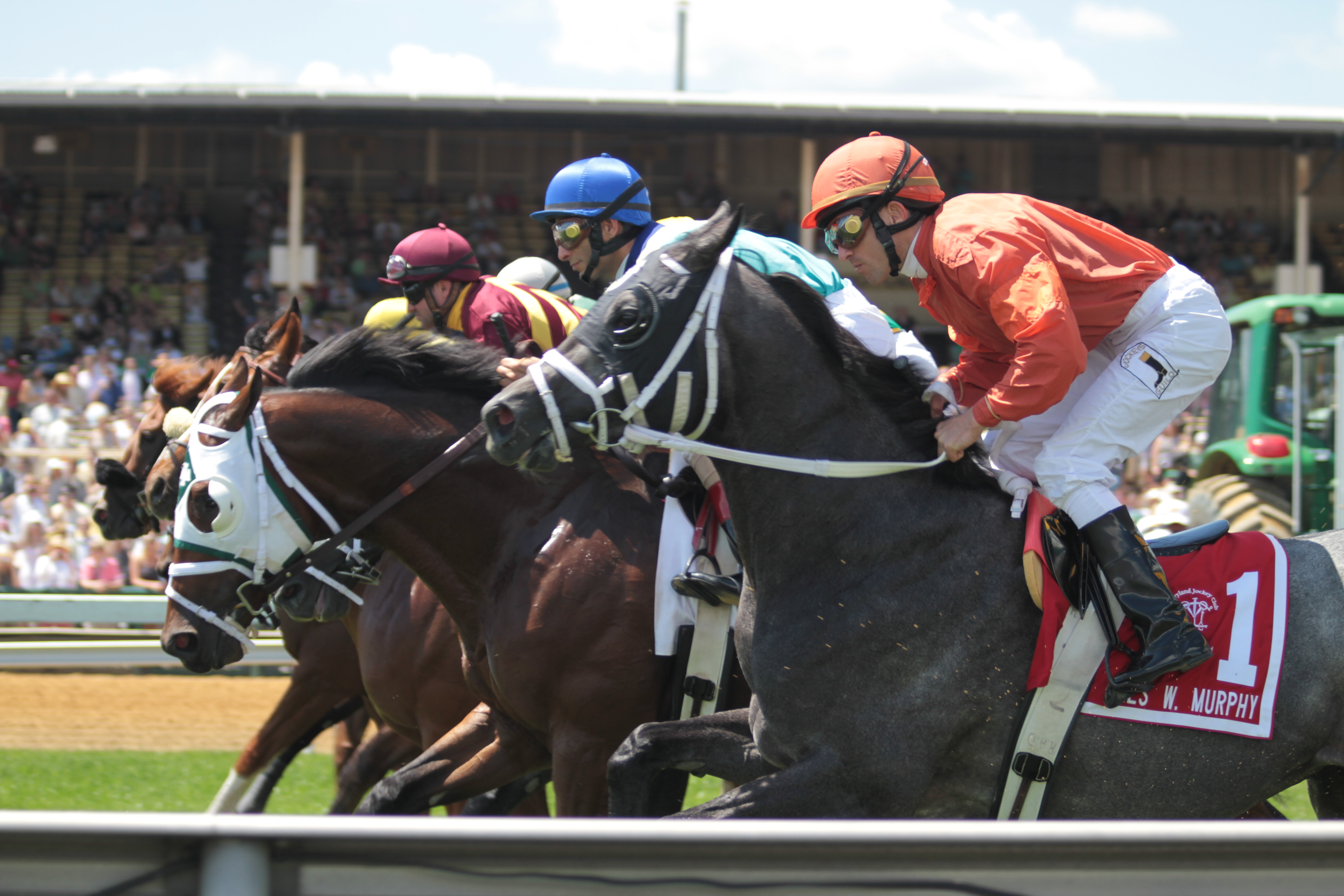
Domínguez (foreground) riding Master Dunker at 2011 James W. Murphy Stakes

Domínguez was the regular rider of two-time Eclipse Award-winning turf champion Gio Ponti, whom he has ridden to victories in six Grade One stakes races including Belmont Park's Man o' War Stakes twice, as well as the Arlington Million, Frank E. Kilroe Mile Handicap and Shadwell Turf Mile Stakes twice. His first win in the Breeders' Cup came in 2004 when he rode Better Talk Now to victory in the Breeders' Cup Turf. His second Breeders' Cup victory was the 2011 Juvenile when he rode Hansen to victory in gate-to-wire fashion over Union Rags. His third and final win in the Breeders' Cup came in 2012, also in the Breeders' Cup Turf, when Little Mike upset the race at 17-1 odds.

Domínguez has won six races in a day on four occasions, most recently on July 22, 2012, when he rode six winners from seven mounts at Saratoga Race Course tying the same day win record by a jockey among all New York tracks. He is the second jockey in Saratoga's history to win six races on a single race card. He has also won five races in a day on several occasions at Aqueduct Racetrack, most recently on February 17, 2010, when he won the first five races on the card.

In 2012 Dominguez topped the New York Racing Association (NYRA) riding circuit for the fourth straight year with 322 victories, and was also the winner of the George Woolf Memorial Jockey Award, bestowed by his peers for excellent conduct and given by Santa Anita Park. Domínguez is the recipient of the 2010, 2011, and 2012 Eclipse Award for Outstanding Jockey. In 2012 set a new mark for single-season earnings by a jockey, when his mounts brought home $25,582,252 to shatter the 2003 bar of $23,354,960 set by Hall of Famer Jerry Bailey.

On June 13, 2013, Dominguez announced his retirement following the advice of his doctors after a traumatic brain injury he sustained at Aqueduct Racetrack on January 18, 2013.

On April 25, 2016, Dominguez's induction into the National Museum of Racing and Hall of Fame was announced.

== Year-end charts ==
| Chart (2000–2012) | Peak position |
|---|---|
| National Earnings List for Jockeys 2000 | 18 |
| National Earnings List for Jockeys 2001 | 10 |
| National Earnings List for Jockeys 2002 | 27 |
| National Earnings List for Jockeys 2003 | 8 |
| National Earnings List for Jockeys 2004 | 9 |
| National Earnings List for Jockeys 2005 | 10 |
| National Earnings List for Jockeys 2006 | 5 |
| National Earnings List for Jockeys 2007 | 6 |
| National Earnings List for Jockeys 2008 | 6 |
| National Earnings List for Jockeys 2009 | 2 |
| National Earnings List for Jockeys 2010 | 1 |
| National Earnings List for Jockeys 2011 | 1 |
| National Earnings List for Jockeys 2012 | 1 |
