= Firenze (horse) =

American-bred Thoroughbred racehorse

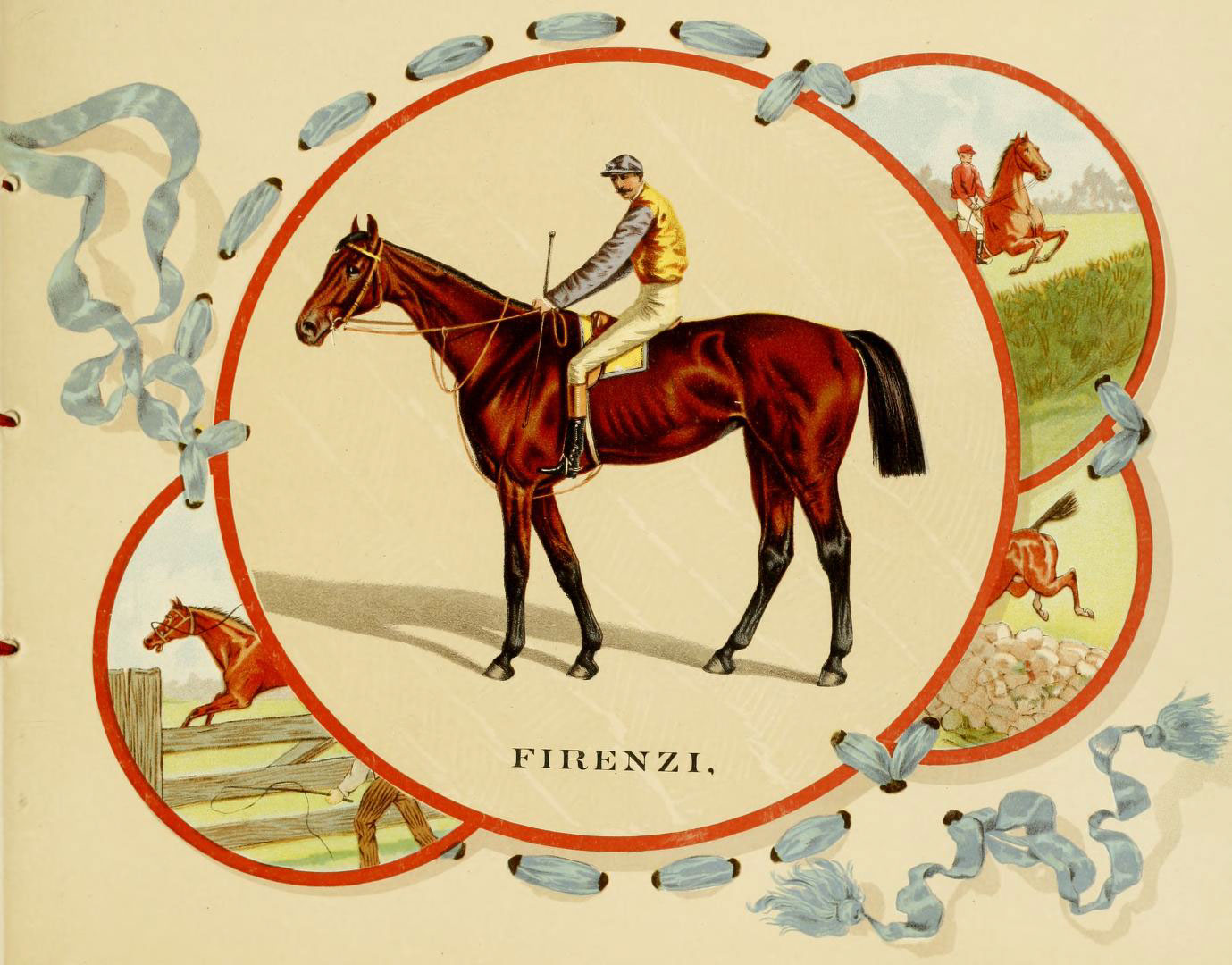
- From Album of celebrated American and English running horses (c. 1888)
- Sire: Glenelg
- Dam: Florida
- Damsire: Virgil
- Sex: Mare
- Foaled: 1884
- Country: United States
- Colour: Bay
- Breeder: Daniel Swigert
- Owner: James Ben Ali Haggin
- Trainer: Matthew Byrnes
- Record: 82: 47-21-9
- Earnings: $112,471

Major wins
- Nursery Stakes (1886); Gazelle Handicap (1887); Ladies Handicap (1887); Mermaid Stakes (1887); Monmouth Oaks (1887); Jerome Stakes (1887); Free Handicap Stakes (1887); Champion Stakes (1888, 1891); Monmouth Cup (1888, 1889); Monmouth Handicap (1888); Freehold Stakes (1888, 1889, 1890); Manhattan Handicap (1888); Free Handicap Sweepstakes (1888, 1890); Firenze Stakes (1888, 1889); New York Handicap (1889, 1890); Omnium Handicap (1889); Knickerbocker Handicap (1889); Navesink Handicap (1889); Coney Island Cup (1890); Twin City Handicap (1890)

Awards
- American Champion Three-Year-Old Filly (1887); American Champion Older Female Horse (1888, 1889, 1890)

Honours
- United States Racing Hall of Fame (1975); Firenze Handicap at Saratoga Race Course
- Last updated on February 16, 2008

Firenze (1884–1902), also recorded as "Firenzi", was an American Thoroughbred Hall of Fame racehorse. During her six-year racing career, she won 47 of 82 starts and retired as the second-highest money-earning filly in American history. She was retroactively named the American Champion Three-Year-Old Filly of 1887 and American Champion Older Female Horse for three straight years. She repeatedly defeated the top colts of the day including the future Hall of Famers, Hanover and Kingston. In the 1888 season, she was the only horse to beat Preakness Stakes winner, The Bard.

== Background ==
Firenze was a bay mare foaled at Elmendorf Farm in Lexington, Kentucky. Her sire was Glenelg, who made his first start as a three-year-old in the 1869 Belmont Stakes and finished second. Glenelg developed into a top-notch handicap horse and then became a four-time leading sire whose offspring were known for their soundness. Firenze's dam Florida was a full sister to the great Hindoo.

She was sold as a yearling by breeder Daniel Swigert to lawyer and businessman James Ben Ali Haggin for $2,600. She was trained by James Murphy at age two and subsequently by Matt Byrnes.

Firenze was a small horse at 15 hands (60 inches, 152 cm). She was noted for her soundness and stamina, making 22 starts at age three and 21 at age four, and was at her best in distances of 1 1/4 miles and up.

== Racing career ==
At age two in 1886, Firenze won five of eight starts, including the Nursery and Autumn Stakes.

As a three-year-old, Firenze dominated the major races for fillies of the time and was also competitive against colts. She won 8 of 14 races including the Ladies Handicap, Gazelle Stakes, Mermaid Stakes, Monmouth Oaks, Free Handicap Stakes, West End Hotel Stakes and Jerome Stakes. In the latter, she defeated Hanover at a distance of 1 3/4 miles.

=== 1888: four-year-old season ===
From 22 starts at age four, Firenze won 13 times, including eleven stakes races. She was never out of the money, finishing second 6 times and third in the 3 other starts. In the Freehold Stakes, she defeated The Bard in what was essentially a match race with only the two entries. The Bard went to the lead but Firenze stayed within striking distance until she was urged forward around the far turn. As the gap narrowed, The Bard tried to respond and the two horses battled down the stretch until the final strides, when Firenze drew off to win by two lengths. She tied the record for the fastest 1 1/2 miles ever recorded, 2:34, while carrying 113 pounds. The other record holders, Luke Blackburn and Jim Guest, had carried only 102 and 98 pounds respectively.

The Bard was subsequently injured, but Firenze faced a strong challenge in the Champion Stakes from Kingston and his stablemate Santalene. Santalene set the pace for the first mile then tired, leaving Firenze in the lead by two lengths with a mile remaining. Kingston was heavily urged to close ground but could not, and was eased near the finish. Firenze won in hand by six lengths in a time of 2:35.

Firenze was so popular that she had a stakes race named after her, and then went on to win it. Her other stakes wins that year included the Monmouth Cup, Great Long Island Stakes, Monmouth Handicap, Battle Stakes, Average Stakes, Manhattan Handicap, Harvest Handicap and Free Handicap Sweepstakes.

=== 1889: five-year-old season ===
Firenze started her five-year-old campaign with two walkovers at Jerome Park but then suffered a series of defeats. She finally rounded back into form in the Knickerbocker Handicap on June 29, 1889, at a distance of 1 3/8 miles. Firenze trailed the field for nearly a mile, then closed to fourth at the top of the stretch and moved to the lead with a furlong remaining. Her jockey eased her up, which allowed Euros to close ground and then put a head in front. Firenze was then put to an all-out drive and prevailed by a head. She easily defeated Raceland in the Monmouth Cup on July 11, then won the Navesink Handicap in "the easiest possible fashion" on July 21.

Her form was up and down in her next few starts, with three losses to Euros, Raceland and Kingston respectively, offset by a sweepstakes win at Monmouth Park. She reestablished her dominance in the New York Handicap on September 5 at a distance of 1 1/2 miles, closing from last to first in the stretch. Just two days later, she cut back in distance to 1 1/8 miles in the Omnium Handicap. She trailed the field early and closed to third around the final turn. Her jockey then asked her to run and she unleashed a burst of speed, drawing away from the field "as easily as a duck shucks raindrops from its back". The win led The New York Times to call her the greatest racehorse of the year.

That year she also won both the Freehold and Firenze Stakes for a second time. She finished the year with 12 wins from 21 starts with six seconds and three thirds.

=== 1890-1891 ===
At age six, Firenze won half of her fourteen starts and finished third three times. She won the Freehold Stakes for a third time and the Free Handicap Sweepstakes for the second. She lowered her record for 1 1/2 miles to 2:33 in the Coney Island Cup. She also won the Twin City and New York Handicaps.

In 1891 at age seven, Firenze started only three times with two wins. She won the Champion Stakes for the second time.

At her retirement Firenze had achieved the second highest earnings for a filly in American history behind Miss Woodford and just ahead of Yo Tambien.

After racing for six years, Firenze retired to her owner's Rancho Del Paso stud farm near Sacramento, California.

== Retirement ==
As a broodmare, her own progeny achieved only modest success in racing but several of her fillies became successful producers. She was the fourth dam of Paul Jones, the 1920 Kentucky Derby winner.

Firenze died on March 27, 1902, at Rancho Del Paso. In 1981, she was inducted into the National Museum of Racing and Hall of Fame. The Firenze Handicap, since renamed the Personal Ensign Stakes, was originally named in her honor.

== Pedigree ==
Pedigree of Firenze (registered as Firenzi)
Sire Glenelg	Citadel (GB)	Stockwell (GB)	The Baron (IRE)
Sire Glenelg	Citadel (GB)	Stockwell (GB)	Pocahontas (GB)
Sire Glenelg	Citadel (GB)	Sortie	Melbourne (GB)
Sire Glenelg	Citadel (GB)	Sortie	Escalade (GB)
Sire Glenelg	Babta (GB)	Kingston (GB)	Venison (GB)
Sire Glenelg	Babta (GB)	Kingston (GB)	Queen Anne (GB)
Sire Glenelg	Babta (GB)	Alice Lowe (GB)	Defence (GB)
Sire Glenelg	Babta (GB)	Alice Lowe (GB)	Pet (GB)
Dam Florida	Virgil	Vandal	Glencoe
Dam Florida	Virgil	Vandal	Tranby Mare
Dam Florida	Virgil	Hymenia	Yorkshire
Dam Florida	Virgil	Hymenia	Little Peggy
Dam Florida	Florence	Lexington	Boston
Dam Florida	Florence	Lexington	Alice Carneal
Dam Florida	Florence	Weatherwitch (GB)	Weatherbit (GB)
Dam Florida	Florence	Weatherwitch (GB)	Birdcatcher Mare (GB) (family: 24)

== See also ==
List of leading Thoroughbred racehorses
Repeat winners of horse races
