= Evert V. Snedecker =

American horse racing trainer and owner

Evert Snedeker
Personal information
- Born: c. 1838 Long Island, New York, United States
- Died: January 29, 1899
- Occupation: Trainer / Owner

Horse racing career
- Sport: Horse racing
- Career wins: Not found

Major racing wins
- Doswell Stakes (1876); Autumn Cup Handicap (1882, 1883); Champion Stakes (1882); Grand National Handicap (1882); Freehold Stakes (1882, 1883, 1884); Mermaid Stakes (1884); Monmouth Oaks (1884); August Stakes (1886); Select Stakes (1886)

Significant horses
- Eole, Vigil, St. Saviour, Kingston

Evert V. "Eph" Snedecker (c. 1838 – January 29, 1899) was an American Thoroughbred horse racing trainer and owner.

Born on Long Island, New York, Evert Snedecker grew up in a family involved with the sport of horse racing. His grandparents owned racehorses and one of his uncles was a trainer. In 1852 he went to work at the uncle's stable where he would learn to be a trainer. From there, he was hired as assistant trainer to John Miner who was then handling the John Hunter racing stable. Hunter became the first chairman of The Jockey Club and in partnership with William Travers built Saratoga Race Course.

In 1876 Evert Snedecker was hired by the newly formed Dwyer Brothers Stable. In October of that year the Dwyers bought the colt Vigil from Col. David McDaniel. To that point in the year, the colt had earned $5,630 but in the ensuing few months under Snedecker won another $20,160. Vigil would be chosen the 1876 retrospective American Champion Three-Year-Old Male Horse. In 1884, Snedecker conditioned St. Saviour, owned by Frederick Gebhard, who was also selected as the retrospective American Champion Three-Year-Old Male Horse for 1884.

During his career, Evert Snedecker trained for other notable owners such as George Lorillard and J. Otto Donner.

At an 1885 sale of Spendthrift yearlings at Madison Square Garden in New York City, Evert Snedecker purchased a colt for $2,250 he named Kingston. At age two, Kingston was the third highest rated colt of his age group, earning wins in the August and Select Stakes. At the end of the year, Snedecker sold Kingston to the Dwyer Brothers for $12,500. The colt went on to win a career total of 89 races, the most in the history of the sport of Thoroughbred horse racing and earn induction in the U.S. Racing Hall of Fame.

Snedecker died of a heart attack at the Morris Park Racecourse in Westchester County, New York.
