= Buddhist (horse) =

American Thoroughbred racehorse

- Sire: Hindoo
- Grandsire: Virgil
- Dam: Emma Hanly
- Damsire: Buckden
- Sex: Stallion
- Foaled: 1886
- Country: United States
- Color: Dark bay or brown
- Breeder: Clay & Woodford partnership
- Owner: Samuel S. Brown
- Trainer: John W. Rogers

Major wins
- American Classics wins: Preakness Stakes (1889)

Buddhist (1886 – December 30, 1893) was an American Thoroughbred racehorse who won the 1889 Preakness Stakes at the Pimlico Race Course in Baltimore, Maryland. Buddhist's sire and dam were Hindoo and Emma Hanly. Buddhist was bred in Kentucky by Ezekiel F. Clay & Catesby Woodford and his owner was Samuel S. Brown. He was trained by future U.S. Racing Hall of Fame inductee, John W. Rogers.

Buddhist's jockey, George "Spider" Anderson, is considered among the great African American jockeys in horse racing history. On May 10, 1889, Anderson and Buddhist finished the race with an astonishing time of 2:17.50 and became the 17th winners of the Preakness Stakes. Buddhist made Preakness history by having one of the largest winning margins when he won the race by eight lengths. Buddhist died in a stable fire on December 30, 1893, that also killed 11 other horses at C. V. Hollar's Bishop Farm.

== Pedigree ==
Pedigree of Buddhist
Sire Hindoo 1878	Virgil 1864	Vandal	Glencoe I
Sire Hindoo 1878	Virgil 1864	Vandal	Tranby Mare
Sire Hindoo 1878	Virgil 1864	Hymenia	Yorkshire
Sire Hindoo 1878	Virgil 1864	Hymenia	Little Peggy
Sire Hindoo 1878	Florence 1869	Lexington	Boston
Sire Hindoo 1878	Florence 1869	Lexington	Alice Carneal
Sire Hindoo 1878	Florence 1869	Weatherwitch	Weatherbit
Sire Hindoo 1878	Florence 1869	Weatherwitch	Birdcatcher Mare
Dam Emma Hanly 1880	Buckden 1869	Lord Clifden	Newminster
Dam Emma Hanly 1880	Buckden 1869	Lord Clifden	The Slave
Dam Emma Hanly 1880	Buckden 1869	Consequence	Bay Middleton
Dam Emma Hanly 1880	Buckden 1869	Consequence	Result
Dam Emma Hanly 1880	Glena 1874	Glengarry	Thormanby
Dam Emma Hanly 1880	Glena 1874	Glengarry	Carbine
Dam Emma Hanly 1880	Glena 1874	Neutrality	Revenue
Dam Emma Hanly 1880	Glena 1874	Neutrality	Sea Breeze

== See also ==
- Hindus (horse)
