= Vigil (horse) =

American-bred Thoroughbred racehorse

- Sire: Virgil
- Grandsire: Vandal
- Dam: Regan
- Damsire: Lexington
- Sex: Stallion
- Foaled: 1873
- Country: United States
- Colour: Bay
- Owner: 1) J. A. Grinstead; 2) Col. David McDaniel; 3) Dwyer Brothers Stable (10/1876)
- Trainer: Col. David McDaniel; Evert V. Snedecker (10/1876)
- Record: Not found
- Earnings: US$not found

Major wins
- Dixie Stakes (1876); Grand National Handicap (1876)

Awards
- American Champion Three-Year-Old Male Horse (1876)
- Last updated on June 17, 2010

Vigil (foaled 1873) was an American Champion Thoroughbred racehorse.
