= Champion Stakes (United States) =

Horse race in New Jersey, US

- Class: Discontinued stakes
- Location: Long Branch Racetrack; Long Branch, New Jersey, United States
- Inaugurated: 1879
- Race type: Thoroughbred - Flat racing

Race information
- Distance: 1 1/2 miles (12 furlongs)
- Surface: Dirt
- Track: left-handed
- Qualification: All ages
- Weight: Assigned

The Champion Stakes was an American Thoroughbred horse race run annually in August at the Monmouth Park Association's racetrack in Long Branch, New Jersey. Inaugurated in 1879, the Champion Stakes was open to horses of any age and was raced on dirt over a distance of one and one half miles (12 furlongs).

In 1891, the races at Long Branch had to be shifted to racetracks in New York when government legislation attempted to inhibit parimutuel wagering. The races were split between the Jerome Park Racetrack in Fordham, Bronx and at the nearby Morris Park Racecourse at Westchester Village. The Monmouth Park Racing Association closed and the land sold after its operating license was revoked in 1893 and government legislation was enacted that banned parimutuel wagering.

In the final running of the Champion Stakes in 1892, Lamplighter set a new stakes and track record.

== Records ==
Speed record:

- 2:32.75 - Lamplighter (1892)

Most wins:

- 2 - Firenze (1888, 1891)

Most wins by a jockey:

- 4 - Jim McLaughlin (1880, 1881, 1884, 1887)

Most wins by a trainer:

- 3 - James G. Rowe Sr. (1880, 1881, 1884)
- 3 - Matthew Byrnes (1888, 1990, 1991)

Most wins by an owner:

- 4 - Dwyer Brothers Stable (1880, 1881, 1884, 1887)

== Winners ==
| Year | Winner | Age | Jockey | Trainer | Owner | Dist. (Miles) | Time |
|---|---|---|---|---|---|---|---|
| 1892 | Lamplighter | 3 | Willie Simms | John Huggins | Pierre Lorillard IV | 11/2 | 2:32.75 |
| 1891 | Firenze | 7 | Shelby Barnes | Matthew Byrnes | James Ben Ali Haggin | 11/2 | 2:38.50 |
| 1890 | Salvator | 4 | Isaac Burns Murphy | Matthew Byrnes | James Ben Ali Haggin | 11/2 | 2:35.50 |
| 1889 | Los Angeles | 4 | Shelby Barnes | Robert E. Campbell | Santa Anita Stables | 11/2 | 2:54.00 |
| 1888 | Firenze | 4 | Edward H. Garrison | Matthew Byrnes | James Ben Ali Haggin | 11/2 | 2:35.00 |
| 1887 | Hanover | 3 | Jim McLaughlin | Frank McCabe | Dwyer Brothers Stable | 11/2 | 2:38.00 |
| 1886 | Volante | 4 | Isaac Burns Murphy | Albert Cooper | Santa Anita Stables | 11/2 | 2:45.00 |
| 1885 | Freeland | 6 | Jim Murphy | John W. Rogers | Edward Corrigan | 11/2 | 2:36.00 |
| 1884 | Miss Woodford | 4 | Jim McLaughlin | James G. Rowe Sr. | Dwyer Brothers Stable | 11/2 | 2:40.25 |
| 1883 | Monitor | 7 | Edward Feakes | R. Wyndham Walden | George L. Lorillard | 11/2 | 2:36.25 |
| 1882 | Eole | 4 | George Barbee | Evert V. Snedecker | Frederick Gebhard | 11/2 | 2:43.75 |
| 1881 | Hindoo | 3 | Jim McLaughlin | James G. Rowe Sr. | Dwyer Brothers Stable | 11/2 | 2:39.00 |
| 1880 | Luke Blackburn | 3 | Jim McLaughlin | James G. Rowe Sr. | Dwyer Brothers Stable | 11/2 | 2:34.00 |
| 1879 | Spendthrift | 3 | Frank Shelton | Thomas Puryear | James R. Keene | 11/2 | 2:41.50 |
