= Isaac Murphy Award =

Horse racing award

The Isaac Murphy Award is an American honor presented annually since 1995 by the National Turf Writers Association of the United States to the thoroughbred horse racing jockey with the highest winning percentage who has ridden in a minimum of 500 races during the year. The award is named in honor of Isaac Murphy, a 19th-century African American Hall of Fame jockey.

Since its inception, Hall of Fame jockey Russell Baze has won it every year except for 2004, when he placed second.

== Past recipients ==
- 1995 – Russell Baze
- 1996 – Russell Baze
- 1997 – Russell Baze
- 1998 – Russell Baze
- 1999 – Russell Baze
- 2000 – Russell Baze
- 2001 – Russell Baze
- 2002 – Russell Baze
- 2003 – Russell Baze
- 2004 – Ramon Dominguez
- 2005 – Russell Baze
- 2006 – Russell Baze
- 2007 – Russell Baze
- 2008 – Russell Baze

== See also ==
- National Turf Writers Association
