= Frank McCabe (horse trainer) =

American horse trainer

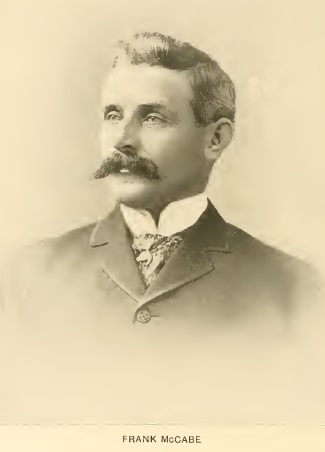

Personal information
- Born: March 10, 1859 Paterson, New Jersey
- Died: June 26, 1924 (aged 65) Brooklyn, New York
- Occupations: Jockey, Trainer

Horse racing career
- Sport: Horse racing

Major racing wins
- As a jockey: Dixie Stakes (1872); Saratoga Cup (1873) As a trainer: Freehold Stakes (1885); Surf Stakes (1885, 1886, 1893); Belles Stakes (1886); First Special Stakes (1886, 1888, 1889); Foam Stakes (1886, 1895); June Stakes (1886); Juvenile Stakes (1886, 1887); Spring Stakes (1886, 1888, 1889); Tidal Stakes (1886, 1887, 1891, 1898); Travers Stakes (1886, 1888, 1890); Zephyr Stakes (1886, 1887, 1889); Brooklyn Derby (1887); Coney Island Derby (1887); Champion Stakes (1887); Dolphin Stakes (1887); Hudson Stakes (1887, 1888); Second Special Stakes (1887, 1888); September Stakes (1887); Withers Stakes (1887, 1888); Mermaid Stakes (1888); Tremont Stakes (1888, 1895, 1897); Double Event Stakes (part 1) (1895); Double Event Stakes (part 2) (1895); Great Trial Stakes (1895); Vernal Stakes (1895); Toronto Cup Stakes (1902) American Classic Race wins: Belmont Stakes (1886, 1887, 1888); Preakness Stakes (1899)

Honours
- United States' Racing Hall of Fame (2007)

Significant horses
- Half Time, Hanover, Kingston, Inspector B. Miss Woodford, Tremont, Sir Dixon

Franklin McCabe (March 10, 1859 – June 26, 1924) was an American jockey and a Hall of Fame trainer of Thoroughbred racehorses.

McCabe began his career as a jockey before becoming a leading trainer during the latter part of the 19th century and for the first few decades of the 20th century. He began his training career as an assistant to James G. Rowe Sr., and after 1884, took charge of the Dwyer Brothers Stable when Rowe left. Following the dissolution of the Dwyer Brothers racing partnership, McCabe stayed as the trainer for Philip J. Dwyer until late 1901, when he signed with the prominent Canadian owner, William M. Hendrie.

Frank McCabe was inducted in the National Museum of Racing and Hall of Fame in 2007.
