= Miss Woodford =

American Thoroughbred racehorse

- Miss Woodford beating Freeland in 1885
- Sire: Billet
- Grandsire: Voltigeur
- Dam: Fancy Jane
- Damsire: Neil Robinson
- Sex: Filly
- Foaled: 1880
- Country: United States
- Color: Brown
- Breeder: Clay & Woodford partnership
- Owner: Bowen & Company; Dwyer Brothers Stable
- Trainer: James G. Rowe Sr. Frank McCabe (at age 5)
- Record: 48: 37-7-2
- Earnings: $118,270

Major wins
- Misses' Stakes (1882); Spinaway Stakes (1882); Pimlico Stakes (1883); Alabama Stakes (1883); Ladies Handicap (1883); Monmouth Oaks (1883); Mermaid Stakes (1883); Champion Stakes (1884); Ocean Stakes (1884, 1885, 1886); Freehold Stakes (1885); Monmouth Cup (1888, 1889)

Honors
- United States Racing Hall of Fame (1967); Miss Woodford Stakes at Monmouth Park Racetrack
- Last updated on 17 November 2010

Miss Woodford (1880–1899) was a champion American Thoroughbred racehorse who was one of the top American fillies of all time, winning 16 consecutive races.

== Background ==
Miss Woodford was bred in Kentucky by the Ezekiel Clay & Catesby Woodford breeding partnership and foaled at Clay's Runnymeade Stud. Miss Woodford was by Billet, who was imported from England and went on to be the Leading sire in North America in 1883, due almost entirely to Miss Woodford. She was out of the unraced mare Fancy Jane, who was by Neil Robinson.

Miss Woodford was sold to Mike and Phil Dwyer of the Dwyer Brothers Stable to replace Hindoo, their retired champion. They traded Hindoo as a stallion prospect plus a couple of fillies to her then owner, George W. Bowen, in exchange for $9,000 cash and his three-year-old filly. The fillies were two daughters of the mare Maggie B.B.: Red and Blue by Alarm, and the stakes winner Francesca by the leading sire Leamington.

== Racing career ==
Miss Woodford had already raced for Bowen & Company, winning the Spinaway Stakes. After she was purchased by the Dwyers, Miss Woodford, like Hindoo, was trained by National Museum of Racing and Hall of Fame inductee James G. Rowe Sr. A dispute with the Dwyers concerning Miss Woodford caused Rowe to resign and become a racing official. (Eventually, though, Rowe returned to training, campaigning great runners such as two-time Horse of the Year (1900–1901) and Belmont Stakes winner Commando, Sysonby, Commando's Belmont Stakes-winning sons Peter Pan and Colin, Maskette and Sweep, all for James R. Keene). At the time they acquired Miss Woodford, the Dwyer brothers already owned a colt who was considered the best of his crop. With the addition of Miss Woodford, they now owned a top colt, George Kinney, and a top filly.

One of the highlights of her three-year-old season was defeating George Kinney, her stablemate who had won the Belmont Stakes. At three, four, and five, Miss Woodford won 16 consecutive races. By the end of her fifth year of racing, Miss Woodford was America's leading money winner, having earned $98,179. She won six races in less than two months at the age of six.

One of her best efforts was the Eclipse Stake at the Fair Grounds in St Louis. There she faced the first two winners of the American Derby: Modesty and Volante. Miss Woodford won to push her earnings over the $100,000 mark, becoming the first horse ever to do so in a racing career. She also won the Monmouth Cup at Long Branch Racetrack (twice), the Monmouth Oaks, the Ocean Stakes (three times), the Eatontown Stakes and the West End Hotel Stakes.

Miss Woodford ran in 48 races and won 37. She was second in 7 and third in 2. In her three match races, she won two. Her lifetime earnings at distances up to 2 1/2 miles amounted to $118,270. This made her the highest stakes winning filly in American history. Firenze followed her in earnings, and then came Yo Tambien.

== Breeding career ==
Miss Woodford was sold to James B. A. Haggin and was bred. Although she produced the stakes winners George Kessler and Sombre, as well as three other winners from nine foals, none of her progeny approached her abilities.

== Honors ==
Miss Woodford was inducted into the National Museum of Racing and Hall of Fame in Saratoga Springs, New York, in 1967.

Hall of Fame trainers Sunny Jim Fitzsimmons, Thomas J. Healey, A. Jack Joyner, R. Wyndham Walden, and Rowe all thought her one of the best fillies of all time. In a poll among members of the American Trainers Association, conducted in 1955 by Delaware Park Racetrack, Miss Woodford was voted the fifth greatest filly in American racing history. Gallorette was voted first.

The Miss Woodford Stakes has been run at Monmouth Park in her memory since 1952.

Miss Woodford died in 1899 at Elmendorf Farm in Lexington, Kentucky.

== See also ==
- List of leading Thoroughbred racehorses
- Repeat winners of horse races
