= John Huggins (racehorse trainer) =

Anerican racehorse trainer (1848–1917)

Personal information
- Born: February 25, 1848 Fulshear, Texas, United States
- Died: May 8, 1917 (aged 69) Fulshear, Texas, United States
- Resting place: Fulshear Cemetery
- Occupation: Racehorse trainer/owner

Horse racing career
- Sport: Horse racing

Major racing wins
- United States; Jerome Handicap (1886, 1905); Dixie Stakes (1886, 1888); Freehold Stakes (1886, 1887, 1892); Spindrift Stakes (1886); September Stakes (1886); Belles Stakes (1887); Suburban Handicap (1887); Brooklyn Handicap (1888); Monmouth Handicap (1889); Champion Stakes (1892); Twin City Handicap (1892); Reapers Stakes (1892); Daisy Stakes (1893); First Special Stakes (1893); Pansy Stakes (1893); Sapphire Stakes (1894); Travers Stakes (1895); Matron Stakes (1904); Rancho Del Paso Stakes (1904); Double Event Stakes (part 2) (1905); Edgemere Handicap (1905); Huron Handicap (1905); Century Handicap (1906); Test Handicap (1907); Toboggan Handicap (1907); Foam Stakes (1908); Great Eastern Handicap (1908); Russet Stakes (1908) American Classics wins: Preakness Stakes (1886); Belmont Stakes (1889) England; Wood Ditton Stakes (1899); Derby Biennial Foal Stakes (1899); Scarborough Stakes (1899); Derby Biennial Foal Stakes (1899); Scarborough Stakes (1899); British Dominion Two-Year-Old Plate (1900); Hurst Park Foal Plate (1900); National Breeders' Produce Stakes (1900); Criterion Stakes (1901); Sandown Foal Stakes (1901); Cambridgeshire Handicap (1901, 1902) British Classics wins: 1000 Guineas Stakes (1899); Epsom Derby (1901)

Racing awards
- British flat racing Champion Trainer (1901)

Significant horses
- ERic, Lamplighter, La Tosca, Nasturtium, The Bard, Sibola, Star Shoot, Volodyovski
- Updated on October 29, 2018

John Huggins (February 25, 1848 – May 8, 1917) was an American owner and trainer in Thoroughbred racing the New York Times called one of the most successful trainers in America. A native of Texas, in 1886 he won the American Classic Race the Preakness Stakes with The Bard. He also had considerable success racing in England where he won two British Classic Races. The first came with Sibola in the 1899 1000 Guineas Stakes and the second with Volodyovski in the Epsom Derby of 1901, a year in which he was the British Champion Trainer. His win of the Epsom Derby was the first ever by an American trainer and is commemorated in a Historical Marker in front of Huggins hometown city hall in Fulshear, Texas.

John Huggins died in 1917 at his home in Fulshear at the age of 69. He is interred in the Fulshear Cemetery. In 1979, the new Huggins Elementary School at No. 1 Huggins Dr. in Fulshear, Texas was named in his honor.

U.S. Champions trained:
The Bard - 1886 American Champion Three-Year-Old Male Horse
La Tosca - 1891 American Champion Three-Year-Old Filly
Lamplighter - 1893 American Champion Older Male Horse
