= Hindoo (horse) =

American-bred Thoroughbred racehorse

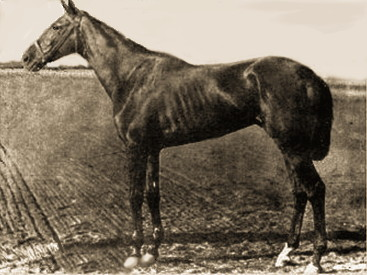
- Sire: Virgil
- Grandsire: Vandal
- Dam: Florence
- Damsire: Lexington
- Sex: Stallion
- Foaled: 1878
- Died: July 4, 1901
- Country: United States
- Color: Bay
- Breeder: Daniel Swigert
- Owner: Dwyer Brothers Stable; Colors: Red, blue sash, red cap
- Trainer: Edward D. Brown; James G. Rowe Sr.
- Record: 35: 30–3–2
- Earnings: $71,875

Major wins
- Champion Stakes (1881); Clark Handicap (1881); Coney Island Derby (1881); Tidal Stakes (1881); Kenner Stakes (1881); Travers Stakes (1881); United States Hotel Stakes (1881); Coney Island Handicap (1882) American Classic Race wins: Kentucky Derby (1881)

Awards
- U.S. Champion Two-Year-Old Colt (1880); U.S. Champion 3-Year-Old Colt (1881); U.S. Champion Handicap Horse (1882)

Honors
- United States Racing Hall of Fame (1955)
- Last updated on 14 September 2010

Hindoo (1878–1901) was an outstanding American Thoroughbred race horse who won 30 of his 35 starts, including the Kentucky Derby, the Travers Stakes, and the Clark Handicap. He later sired Preakness Stakes winner Buddhist and Belmont Stakes winner and Leading sire in North America Hanover.

Hindoo was a bay colt bred by Daniel Swigert of Elmendorf Farm in Kentucky. Hindoo was sired by Virgil (sire of the Kentucky Derby winners, Vagrant and Ben Ali). His dam, Florence, was by the racehorse and sire Lexington. He was a brother to Florida, who was the dam of the racemare Firenze, who won 47 of her 82 starts.

== Racing record ==
Hindoo was trained by future Hall of Fame inductee Edward D. Brown. Hindoo was sold for $15,000 during his two-year-old season to the Dwyer Brothers Stable of Mike and Phil Dwyer, and his training was taken over by another future Hall of Fame inductee, James G. Rowe Sr.

=== 1881 Kentucky Derby ===
Hindoo was a 3–1 favorite heading into Kentucky Derby. Ridden by Jim McLaughlin, when the race started, Hindoo, as expected, took the lead. Then, at the halfway pole, Lexex took the lead. As the horses went into the turn, Hindoo regained the lead, and when he entered the stretch he was in command and won by four lengths going away.

=== After the Derby ===
On September 1, 1881, Hindoo won his 19th consecutive race in a purse event at Sheepshead Bay Race Track. His winning streak ended six days later when he finished third in the September Handicap at Sheepshead.

Hindoo also won: Colt and Filly Stakes, Alexander Stakes, Tennessee Stakes, Juvenile Stakes, Jockey Club Stakes, Criterion Stakes, Tremont Hotel Stakes, Blue Ribbon Stakes, Clark Stakes, Tidal Stakes, Coney Island Stakes, Ocean Stakes, Lorillard Stakes, Monmouth Sweepstakes, Travers Stakes, Sequel Stakes, United States Hotel Stakes, Kenner Stakes, Louisville Cup, Merchants' Stakes, Turf Handicap, Coney Island Handicap, Coney Island Cup, Champion Stakes, Jersey Stakes, and St. Leger Stakes.

Hindoo placed second in the Day Boat Line Stakes, Brighton Beach Cap, and Dixiana Stakes. Hindoo finished third in the Windsor Hotel Stakes and the September Cup.

In thirty-five starts, Hindoo was never out of the money. He won thirty times, was second three times, and was third twice. As a three-year-old, he won the 1881 Kentucky Derby in a season where he recorded eighteen straight wins over the course of a few months— nineteen if a dead-heat run-off on the same day is counted. Over the course of his racing career, he won $71,875, making him America's leading money earner. In 1881, he was America's Champion Three-Year-Old Male.

== At stud ==
In his first season at stud, Hindoo's mating with Bourbon Belle produced the champion Hanover, who became the leading sire in the United States for four consecutive years.

Hindoo sired the following top racehorses:

- Hanover
- Buddhist, the 1889 Preakness Stakes winner
- Jim Gore, won the 1887 Clark Handicap and was second in the 1887 Kentucky Derby
- Sallie McLelland (1888), a good race-mare who later produced the Kentucky Oaks winner Audience

Hindoo is the damsire of the following racehorses:

- Whimsical, the 1906 Preakness Stakes winner
- Helios, 1912 American Champion Two-Year-Old Colt
- Blue Girl, the 1901 & 1902 American Champion filly

Hindoo died on July 4, 1901, at Runnymede Stud in Paris, Kentucky. Following the creation of the National Museum of Racing and Hall of Fame in 1955, he was one of the first handful of horses inducted.

== Sire line tree ==
- Hindoo
  - Hanover
    - Buck Massie
      - Jake
      - Buckleya
    - Halma
      - Alan-a-Dale
        - Barnsdale
      - Smart Set
      - Acacia
      - Oversight
        - Mirebeau
        - Insight
    - Hammon
    - Handsome
    - The Commoner
      - Simon D
      - Johnnie Blake
      - Doctor Boots
      - Countless
      - Parmer
      - Great Britain
    - Ben Holladay
    - Handspring
      - Major Daingerfield
      - Handout
        - Trouble
    - Heywood
      - Palo Alto
    - Hamburg
      - Inflexible
        - Textile
        - Pluvious
      - Strephon
      - Dandelion
      - Battleaxe
      - Burgomaster
        - Bourgeois
        - Burgoright
        - Glasgow
        - Sebastolbol
        - Portugal
      - Orison
      - Pegasus
      - The Irishman
      - Baby Wolf
      - Hillside
      - Borrow
      - Buskin
      - Prince Eugene
      - Happy Go Lucky
    - Handball
    - Handsel
      - Grover Hughes
      - Colonel Livingstone
    - Sanders
    - Half Time
    - Handcuff
    - David Garrick
    - Star of Hanover
    - Withers
    - Admonition
    - Holstein
    - Abe Frank
    - Blackstock
      - Mentor
        - Wise Counsellor
    - Kaffir
      - Kaffir Boy
    - King Hanover
      - Prince Ahmed
    - Luck and Charity
    - Serpent
    - Yankee
      - Dinna Ken
      - Yankee Gun
      - Joe Madden
      - Marse Abe
        - Marse Hughes
      - Naushon
      - Nonpareil
      - Penobscot
  - Jim Gore
    - Beau Gallant
    - Gorman
    - Merry Lark
  - Buddhist
  - Dungarvan
    - J H Houghton
  - Merry Monarch
  - Aryan
  - Macy
  - Benroe
  - Howland
  - Miller
  - Alard Scheck

== Pedigree ==
Pedigree of Hindoo (USA), B.h. 1878
| Sire Virgil Bay 1864 | Vandal; Bay 1850 | Glencoe | Sultan |
| Sire Virgil Bay 1864 | Vandal; Bay 1850 | Glencoe | Trampoline |
| Sire Virgil Bay 1864 | Vandal; Bay 1850 | Tranby mare (c.1840) | Tranby (GB) |
| Sire Virgil Bay 1864 | Vandal; Bay 1850 | Tranby mare (c.1840) | Lucilla |
| Sire Virgil Bay 1864 | Hymenia; Bay 1851 | Yorkshire (GB) | St Nicholas |
| Sire Virgil Bay 1864 | Hymenia; Bay 1851 | Yorkshire (GB) | Miss Rose |
| Sire Virgil Bay 1864 | Hymenia; Bay 1851 | Little Peggy | Cripple |
| Sire Virgil Bay 1864 | Hymenia; Bay 1851 | Little Peggy | Peggy Stewart |
| Dam Florence Ch. 1869 | Lexington; Bay 1850 | Boston | Timoleon |
| Dam Florence Ch. 1869 | Lexington; Bay 1850 | Boston | Sister to Tuckahoe |
| Dam Florence Ch. 1869 | Lexington; Bay 1850 | Alice Carneal | Sarpedon (GB) |
| Dam Florence Ch. 1869 | Lexington; Bay 1850 | Alice Carneal | Rowena |
| Dam Florence Ch. 1869 | Weatherwitch (GB); Ch. 1858 | Weatherbit | Sheet Anchor |
| Dam Florence Ch. 1869 | Weatherwitch (GB); Ch. 1858 | Weatherbit | Miss Letty |
| Dam Florence Ch. 1869 | Weatherwitch (GB); Ch. 1858 | Birdcatcher mare (1853) | Birdcatcher (IRE) |
| Dam Florence Ch. 1869 | Weatherwitch (GB); Ch. 1858 | Birdcatcher mare (1853) | Colocynth (Family No. 24) |

== See also ==
- List of leading Thoroughbred racehorses
