= Kingston (horse) =

American-bred Thoroughbred racehorse

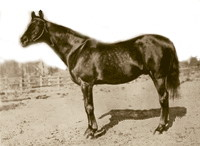
- Sire: Spendthrift
- Grandsire: Australian (GB)
- Dam: Kapanga (GB)
- Damsire: Victorious
- Sex: Stallion
- Foaled: 1884
- Country: United States
- Colour: Brown
- Breeder: James R. Keene
- Owner: Evert Snedecker & J. F. Cushman; Dwyer Brothers (age 3 to 6); Michael F. Dwyer/Castleton Stud (age 6)
- Trainer: Evert Snedecker; Frank McCabe (at age 3); Hardy Campbell, Jr. (at age 6)
- Record: 138: 89-33-12
- Earnings: $140,195

Major wins
- Select Stakes (1886); Dolphin Stakes (1887); Palisade Stakes (1887); September Stakes (1887); Beverwyck Stakes (1888); California Stakes (1888); Excelsior Stakes (1888); First Special Stakes (1888, 1889, 1890); Second Special Stakes (1888); Oriental Handicap (1889); Culver Handicap (1889, 1890, 1891); Flight Stakes (1890, 1892); Speed Stakes (1890); St. James Hotel Stakes (1891)

Awards
- American Co-Champion Handicap Male Horse (1889, 1890); Leading sire in North America (1900, 1910)

Honours
- United States Racing Hall of Fame (1955)
- Last updated on May 30, 2007

Kingston (1884–1912) was an American Thoroughbred racehorse. He won 89 races, the most in the history of the sport of thoroughbred racing. Of his 138 starts, he was out of the money only on four occasions. He was later inducted into the United States Racing Hall of Fame.

== Background ==
He was bred by James R. Keene at his Castleton Stud near Lexington, Kentucky. Kingston was by Spendthrift out of Kapanga (GB) by Victorious, 2nd dam Kapunda, by Stockwell. Kingston's line goes back through Spendthrift to three significant sires: Lexington, Glencoe, and Boston.

Keene only sold him because he was having financial difficulties. As a yearling, Kingston was purchased by the trainer, Evert Snedecker, and his partner J. F. Cushman. They raced him as a two-year-old, during which time he proved himself a colt of quality, though he was beaten by both Hanover and the noted Tremont.

As a three-year-old, Kingston was bought by two Brooklyn ex-butchers, Phil and Mike Dwyer for $12,500. The Dwyer Brothers typically bought horses rather than breeding them, their chosen strategy for building a successful stable. They hoped that owning both Kingston and Hanover would prevent Hanover from racing a horse which might defeat him.

== Racing record ==
Once under the Dwyer's roof, Kingston's conditioning was taken over by future Hall of Fame member Frank McCabe. The colt then went on a streak of success. At three, he won 13 of his 18 starts. At four, he won 10 of 14. At five, he won 14 times from 15 starts. At six, he won 9 of 10 of his ten starts. At seven, he started 21 times and won 15. When he was seven he also set a time record at the old Futurity course at Sheepshead Bay of 1:08 for six furlongs. At the age of eight, he won 13 of his 20 races. At nine, 9 out of 25, but in most of these 25 races he took home money. In his last year of racing, when he was 10 years old, he won four of his nine starts against much younger horses.

== Stud record ==
Two years after he went to stud Kingston was already a leading sire. He led the American sire list in 1900 and 1910.

Kingston's progeny included: Ildrim (Belmont Stakes), Novelty (Belmont Futurity Stakes etc.) and King's Courier (Doncaster Cup).

He died in Kentucky on December 6, 1912.

Following the creation of the National Museum of Racing and Hall of Fame in 1955, Kingston was one of the first group of horses inducted.

== Sire line tree ==
- Kingston
  - Ildrim
  - Kings Courier
  - Hurst Park
    - Brousseau
  - Novelty

== Pedigree ==
Pedigree of Kingston, 1884
Sire Spendthrift	Australian	West Australian (GB)	Melbourne* (GB)
Sire Spendthrift	Australian	West Australian (GB)	Mowerina (GB)
Sire Spendthrift	Australian	Emilia (GB)	Young Emilius (GB)
Sire Spendthrift	Australian	Emilia (GB)	Persian (GB)
Sire Spendthrift	Aerolite	Lexington	Boston
Sire Spendthrift	Aerolite	Lexington	Alice Carneal
Sire Spendthrift	Aerolite	Florine	Glencoe
Sire Spendthrift	Aerolite	Florine	Melody
Dam *Kapanga	Victorious (GB)	Newminster (GB)	Touchstone (GB)
Dam *Kapanga	Victorious (GB)	Newminster (GB)	Beeswing (GB)
Dam *Kapanga	Victorious (GB)	Jeremy Diddler Mare (GB)	Jeremy Diddler (GB)
Dam *Kapanga	Victorious (GB)	Jeremy Diddler Mare (GB)	Voltaire Mare (GB)
Dam *Kapanga	Kapunda (GB)	Stockwell (GB)	The Baron (IRE)
Dam *Kapanga	Kapunda (GB)	Stockwell (GB)	Pocahontas (GB)
Dam *Kapanga	Kapunda (GB)	Adelaide (GB)	Melbourne* (GB)
Dam *Kapanga	Kapunda (GB)	Adelaide (GB)	Brutandorf Mare (GB) (family 13)

* Kingston is inbred 4S × 4D to the stallion Melbourne, meaning that he appears fourth generation on the sire side of his pedigree and fourth generation on the dam side of his pedigree.

== See also ==
- List of leading Thoroughbred racehorses
- List of racehorses
