= Hanover (horse) =

American-bred Thoroughbred racehorse

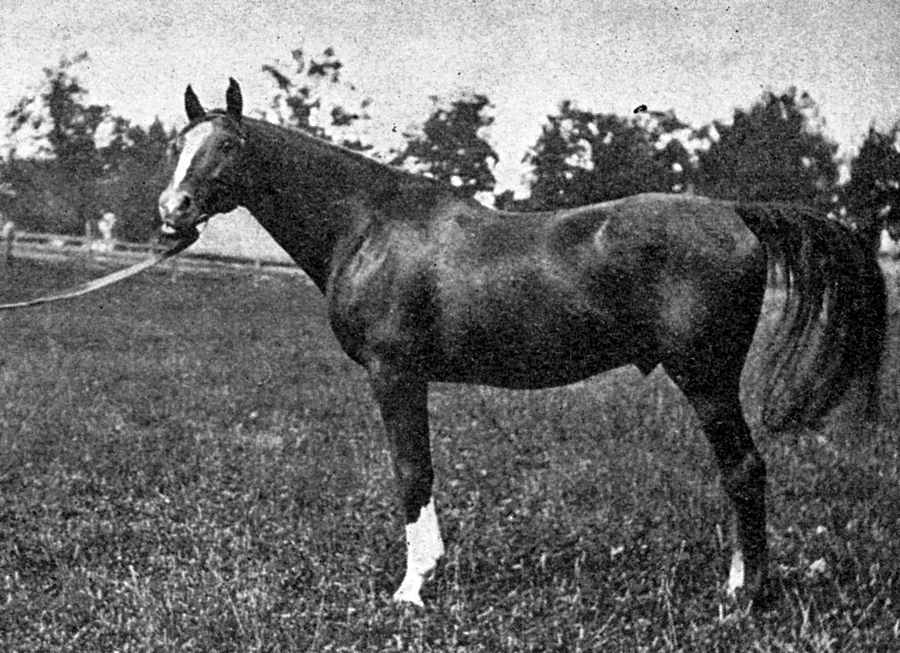
- Hanover from the 1906 Types and Breeds of Farm Animals
- Sire: Hindoo
- Grandsire: Virgil
- Dam: Bourbon Belle
- Damsire: Bonnie Scotland
- Sex: Stallion
- Foaled: 1884
- Country: United States
- Colour: Chestnut
- Breeder: Runnymede Farm
- Owner: Dwyer Brothers Stable
- Trainer: Frank McCabe
- Record: 50: 32–14–2
- Earnings: $118,887

Major wins
- Sapling Stakes (1886); Brookdale Handicap (1887); Champion Stakes (1887); Hopeful Stakes (1886); Withers Mile (1887); Brooklyn Derby (1887); Stockton Stakes (1887); United States Hotel Stakes (1887); Second Special Stakes (1887); Swift Stakes (1887); Spindrift Stakes (1887); Lorillard Stakes (1887) American Classics wins: Belmont Stakes (1887)

Awards
- American Horse of the Year (1887); Leading sire in North America (1895, 1896, 1897, 1898)

Honours
- United States Racing Hall of Fame (1955)
- Last updated on February 4, 2007

Hanover (1884–1899) was a champion American Thoroughbred racehorse, who won his first 17 races. He was the last American stallion to be the leading sire in North America for four consecutive years until Bold Ruler achieved the feat in 1965.

== Background ==
Hanover was a chestnut colt bred at Colonel E. Clay's Runnymede Farm. Hanover was by Hindoo from Bourbon Belle by Bonnie Scotland. At the farm's yearling sale in May 1885, Hanover was sold to the Dwyer Brothers Stable for $1,250, where he joined Tremont, a very precocious two-year-old also born in 1884.

== Racing record ==
Trained by Frank McCabe, at age two, Hanover won all three races he contested: the Hopeful Stakes, the July Stakes, and the Sapling Stakes. With Tremont retired, the Dwyers turned to Hanover as the mainstay for the Dwyer Stable. Hanover started in 27 races at the age of three, racing at distances ranging from four furlongs (800 m) to two miles (3,200 m.), he won 20 times (including the Belmont Stakes by 15 lengths) and finished out of the money only once. Before finishing his first two seasons of racing, Hanover had won 17 consecutive races.

After several losses at age four, and an obvious lameness to the right forefoot, Hanover was nerved and given the remainder of the year to recover. At age five, he lost three times in his first four starts, but finished the season with 9 wins from his 17 race starts. For most of his racing career, Hanover raced against older and top-class horses while conceding them large weights. Hanover stopped racing as America's greatest earner with a career total of $118,887. From his 50 starts, he won 32 races, was second 14 times, and finished third twice, only unplaced twice.

== Stud record ==
After his racing career ended, Hanover was sold to Colonel Milton Young and sent to his McGrathiana Stud farm near Lexington, Kentucky, where he enjoyed a very successful breeding career, becoming the leading sire in the United States for four consecutive years (1885–1889). His offspring include Hall of Fame inductee Hamburg, as well as David Garrick, Halma, Compute, The Commoner, Handspring, Half Time, and Yankee. In addition, he was the damsire of Triple Crown winner Sir Barton and also damsire of the great racing filly Tanya, winner of the 1905 Belmont Stakes.

While pawing, Hanover was unable to feel the pain in his 'unnerved' foot, and broke his coffin bone. This led to septicemia, and his condition worsened before he was humanely euthanized in March 1899.

Following the creation of the National Museum of Racing and Hall of Fame, Hanover was part of the first group of horses inducted in 1955.

== Sire line tree ==
- Hanover
  - Buck Massie
    - Jake
    - Buckleya
  - Halma
    - Alan-a-Dale
      - Barnsdale
    - Smart Set
    - Acacia
    - Oversight
      - Mirebeau
      - Insight
  - Hammon
  - Handsome
  - The Commoner
    - Simon D
    - Johnnie Blake
    - Doctor Boots
    - Countless
    - Parmer
    - Great Britain
  - Ben Holladay
  - Handspring
    - Major Daingerfield
    - Handout
      - Trouble
  - Heywood
    - Palo Alto
  - Hamburg
    - Inflexible
      - Textile
      - Pluvious
    - Strephon
    - Dandelion
    - Battleaxe
    - Burgomaster
      - Bourgeois
      - Burgoright
      - Glasgow
      - Sebastolbol
      - Portugal
    - Orison
    - Pegasus
    - The Irishman
    - Baby Wolf
    - Hillside
    - Borrow
    - Buskin
    - Prince Eugene
    - Happy Go Lucky
  - Handball
  - Handsel
    - Grover Hughes
    - Colonel Livingstone
  - Sanders
  - Half Time
  - Handcuff
  - David Garrick
  - Star of Hanover
  - Withers
  - Admonition
  - Holstein
  - Abe Frank
  - Blackstock
    - Mentor
      - Wise Counsellor
        - Good Advice
        - Supreme Court
        - Deliberator
        - Barre Granite
  - Kaffir
    - Kaffir Boy
  - King Hanover
    - Prince Ahmed
  - Luck and Charity
  - Serpent
  - Yankee
    - Dinna Ken
    - Yankee Gun
    - Joe Madden
    - Marse Abe
      - Marse Hughes
    - Naushon
    - Nonpareil
    - Penobscot

== Pedigree ==
Pedigree of Hanover (USA), chestnut horse, 1884
Sire Hindoo B. 1878	Virgil; Br. 1864	Vandal*	Glencoe*
Sire Hindoo B. 1878	Virgil; Br. 1864	Vandal*	Tranby mare (12) (1840)*
Sire Hindoo B. 1878	Virgil; Br. 1864	Hymenia	Yorkshire
Sire Hindoo B. 1878	Virgil; Br. 1864	Hymenia	Little Peggy
Sire Hindoo B. 1878	Florence; 1869	Lexington	Boston
Sire Hindoo B. 1878	Florence; 1869	Lexington	Alice Carneal
Sire Hindoo B. 1878	Florence; 1869	Weatherwitch	Weatherbit
Sire Hindoo B. 1878	Florence; 1869	Weatherwitch	Birdcatcher mare (24) (1853)
Dam Bourbon Belle 1869	Bonnie Scotland; 1853	Iago	Don John
Dam Bourbon Belle 1869	Bonnie Scotland; 1853	Iago	Scandal
Dam Bourbon Belle 1869	Bonnie Scotland; 1853	Queen Mary	Gladiator
Dam Bourbon Belle 1869	Bonnie Scotland; 1853	Queen Mary	Plenipotentiary mare (10) (1840)
Dam Bourbon Belle 1869	Ella D. 1857	Vandal*	Glencoe*
Dam Bourbon Belle 1869	Ella D. 1857	Vandal*	Tranby mare (12) (1840)*
Dam Bourbon Belle 1869	Ella D. 1857	Falcon	Woodpecker
Dam Bourbon Belle 1869	Ella D. 1857	Falcon	Ophelia (Family: 21)

* Hanover is inbred 3S x 3D to the stallion Vandal, meaning that he appears third generation on the sire side of his pedigree and third generation on the dam side of his pedigree.

== See also ==
- List of leading Thoroughbred racehorses
