= Dwyer Brothers Stable =

Thoroughbred racehorse stable

Coordinates: 40.581°N 73.997°W

- Company type: Horse breeding/Racing Stable
- Industry: Thoroughbred Horse racing
- Founded: 1876 (150 years ago)
- Defunct: 1890 (136 years ago) (dissolved)
- Headquarters: Brooklyn, New York, United States
- Key people: Owners: Philip J. & Michael F. Dwyer; Trainers: Evert Snedecker (1876-1878); James G. Rowe Sr. (1879-1885); Frank McCabe (1885-1890)

Dwyer Brothers Stable was an American thoroughbred horse racing operation owned by Brooklyn businessmen Phil and Mike Dwyer.

The Dwyer brothers hired trainer Evert Snedecker and purchased their first Thoroughbred, Rhadamanthus, in 1874. In October of that same year they acquired Vigil from Col. David McDaniel who to that point had earned $5630. In the ensuing few months of 1876 the colt won another $20,160 and was chosen that year's retrospective American Champion Three-Year-Old Male Horse.

Other trainers who worked for the Dwyers were James G. Rowe Sr. and Frank McCabe. The Dwyers won the 1881 Kentucky Derby with future U.S. Hall of Fame colt Hindoo and finished second with Runnymede the following year. However, they had their greatest racing success in the Belmont Stakes in their hometown, winning the classic event five times. One of the few major races at tracks in the New York/New Jersey area that they never won was the Brooklyn Handicap.

The brothers, either together or individually, owned a number of prominent horses, including Hindoo, Bramble, Bella B., Luke Blackburn, Bonnie Scotland, George Kinney, Miss Woodford, Barnes, Hanover, Raceland, Tremont, Ben Brush, and Cleophus. Mike Dwyer was a partner in Kingston.

In 1886 they were a key part of the group of investors who formed the Brooklyn Jockey Club and built the Gravesend Race Track at Gravesend on Coney Island. The brothers racing partnership was dissolved in 1890 and Mike Dwyer went on to enjoy further success. He won the Kentucky Derby for the second time in 1896 with Ben Brush, ridden by jockey Willie Simms.

The Brooklyn Derby, founded in 1887, was renamed the Dwyer Stakes in their honor in 1918.

== Dwyer Brothers U.S. Champions (retrospective) ==
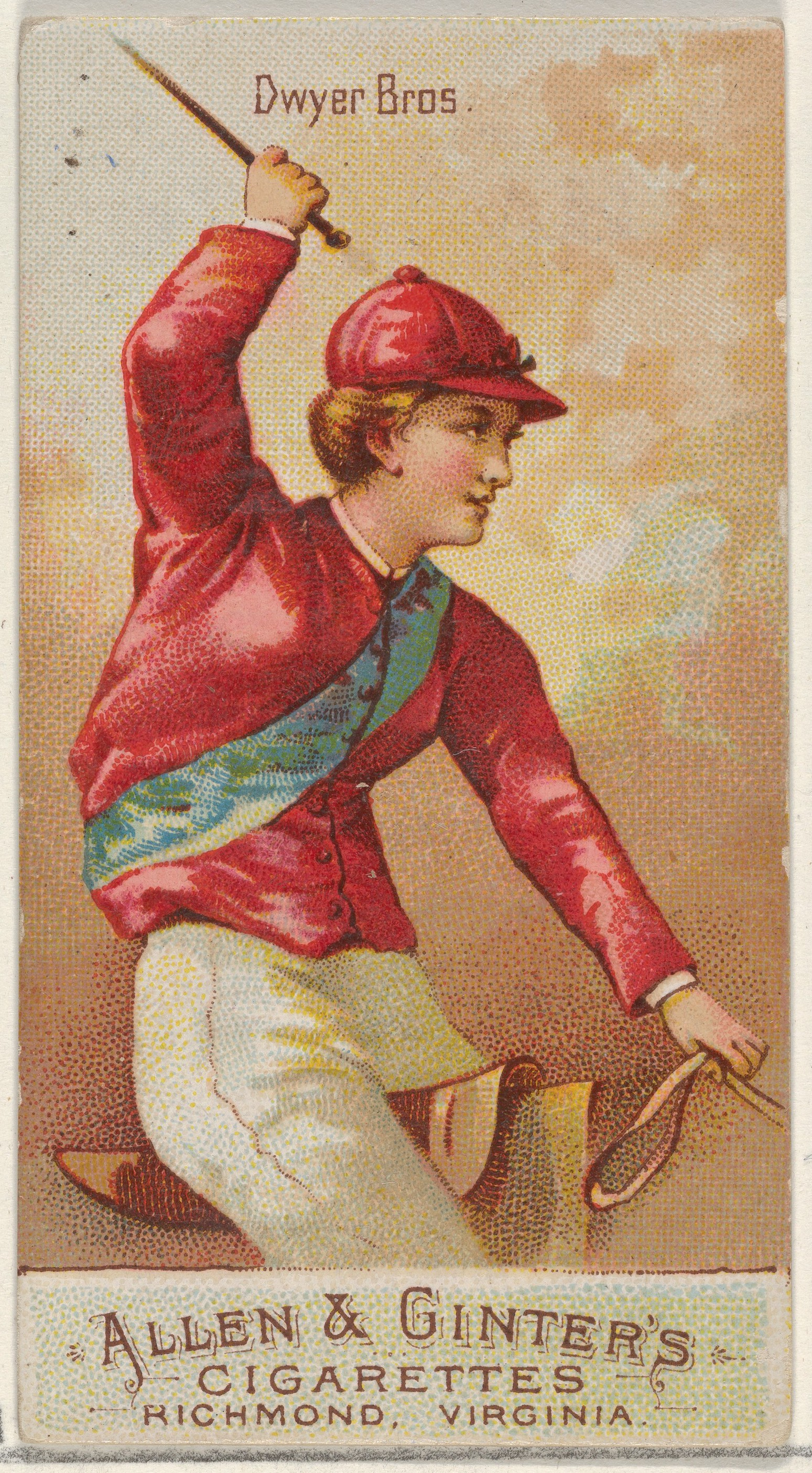
Cigarette card by Allen & Ginter depicting the Dwyer Brothers for the "Racing Colors of the World" set series

- Horse of the Year: Hanover (1887)
- Champion Two-Year-Old Male Horse: Tremont (1886)
- Champion Three-Year-Old Male Horse: Vigil (1876), Hindoo (1881), Runnymede (1882), Inspector B. (1886), Hanover (1887), Sir Dixon (1888)
- Champion Three-Year-Old Filly: Bella B. (1888)
- Champion Older Male Horse: Kingston (1889)

== Dwyer Brothers Stable major race wins ==
=== Kentucky Derby ===
- 1881 : Hindoo
- 1896 : Ben Brush

=== Preakness Stakes ===
- 1899 : Half Time

=== Belmont Stakes ===
- 1883 : George Kinney
- 1884 : Panique
- 1886 : Inspector B
- 1887 : Hanover
- 1888 : Sir Dixon

=== Travers Stakes ===
- 1881 : Hindoo
- 1883 : Barnes
- 1886 : Inspector B.
- 1888 : Sir Dixon
- 1890 : Sir John
