= Carlton Stakes =

- Class: Defunct horse race
- Location: Gravesend Race Track Brooklyn, New York (1887-1910); Aqueduct Racetrack; Queens, New York (1914-1924)
- Inaugurated: 1899
- Race type: Thoroughbred - Flat racing

Race information
- Distance: 1 mle
- Surface: Dirt
- Track: left-handed
- Qualification: Three-year-olds

The Carlton Stakes was an American Thoroughbred horse race for three-year-olds run annually from 1887 thru 1910 at Gravesend Race Track in the Gravesend neighbourhood of Brooklyn, New York. An event run at a distance of one mile on a dirt surface, the Carlton often attracted some of the top-level horses in the country. However, in its second running the New York Times called the 1888 Carlton Stakes a “Complete farce” because there were only four runners scheduled to run in the one mile event but Now or Never, owned by Alexander Cassatt, plus Lucky Baldwin’s future U.S. Racing Hall of Fame inductee Emperor of Norfolk were both withdrawn. As a result, Sir Dixon, ridden by future Hall of Fame jockey Jim McLaughlin, and Raceland with Andrew Godfrey aboard, were the only starters.

== Demise ==
In 1908, the administration of Governor Charles Evans Hughes signed into law the Hart–Agnew bill that effectively banned all racetrack betting in the state of New York. The legislation allowed for fines and up to a year in prison which was strictly enforced. A 1910 amendment to the Hart–Agnew legislation added further restrictions that made the owners and directors of a racetrack personally liable for any betting done on their premises, with or without their consent. Such an onerous liability was intolerable and meant that by 1911 all racetracks in the state ceased operations. Although a February 21, 1913, ruling by the New York Supreme Court, Appellate Division paved the way for racing to resume that year, by then it was too late for horse racing at Gravesend Race Track and it went out of business.

=== A short-lived revival ===
In 1914, a race with the same name and conditions was created at the Aqueduct Racetrack located in the Queens borough of New York City. It would not be run again until the Aqueduct management revived it in 1921 but was permanently dropped from the schedule after the 1924 edition.

== Records ==
Speed record:

- 1:38.80 Dinna Kin (1907) @ Gravesend Race Track
- 1:36.60 Whiskaway (1922) @ Aqueduct Racetrack

Most wins by a jockey: (2)

- Jim McLaughlin (1887, 1988)
- Fred Littlefield (1889, 1891)
- John Lamley (1893, 1895)
- Willie Simms (1896, 1897)
- Henry Spencer (1898, 1901)
- Tommy Burns (1902, 1903)

Most wins by a trainer:

- 5 - James G. Rowe Sr. (1898, 1901, 1909, 1910, 1922)

Most wins by an owner:

- 4 - James R. Keene (1894, 1901, 1909, 1910)

== Winners ==
Year	Winner	Jockey	Trainer	Owner	Dist. (Miles)	Time	Win $
At Aqueduct Racetrack
1924	Ladkin	John Maiben	Louis Feustel	August Belmont Jr.	1 M	1:36.80	$7,350
1923	Dunlin	Chick Lang	William M. Garth	Joshua S. Cosden	1 M	1:37.80	$6,550
1922	Whiskaway	Lester Penman	James G. Rowe Sr.	Harry Payne Whitney	1 M	1:36.60	$6,100
1921	Knobbie	Earl Sande	Sam Hildreth	Rancocas Stable	1 M	1:38.20	$6,450
1915	1920	Race not held					
1914	Luke McLuke	Merritt Buxton	John F. Schorr	John W. Schorr	1 M	1:38.80	$5,125
At Gravesend Racetrack
1910	Sweep	Vincent Powers	James G. Rowe Sr.	James R. Keene	1 M	1:39.20	$1,900
1909	Hilarious	James Butwell	James G. Rowe Sr.	James R. Keene	1 M	1:41.20	$4,815
1908	Chapultepec	Dave R. McDaniel	Fred Burlew	B & O Stable (Fred Burlew & Frank O'Neill)	1 M	1:39.40	$6,790
1907	Dinna Kin	Charles Koerner	John W. Rogers	Harry Payne Whitney	1 M	1:38.80	$5,455
1906	Burgomster	Lucien Lyne	John W. Rogers	Harry Payne Whitney	1 M	1:41.60	$4,380
1905	Cairngorm	Willie Davis	A. Jack Joyner	Sidney Paget	1 M	1:41.60	$3,200
1904	Montreson	Arthur Redfern	Thomas J. Healey	Richard T. Wilson Jr.	1 M	1:43.20	$6,100
1903	Reliable	Tommy Burns	John W. Rogers	William Collins Whitney	1 M	1:40.00	$4,150
1902	King Hanover	Tommy Burns	John W. Rogers	William Collins Whitney	1 M	1:40.20	$3,850
1901	Commando	Henry Spencer	James G. Rowe Sr.	James R. Keene	1 M	1:39.40	$3,850
1900	Standing	Nash Turner	Richard "Dick" Roche	Richard "Dick" Roche	1 M	1:40.75	$5,150
1899	Lothario	Henry "Skeets" Martin	William C. Smith	George E. Smith	1 M	1:42.00	$3,850
1898	The Huguenot	Henry Spencer	James G. Rowe Sr.	William P. & Lewis S. Thompson	1 M	1:45.25	$3,850
1897	Don de Oro	Willie Simms	John J. Hyland	August Belmont Jr.	1 M	1:44.75	$3,850
1896	Handspring	Willie Simms	Frank McCabe	Philip J. Dwyer	1 M	1:43.00	$3,850
1895	Counter Tenor	John Lamley	William Lakeland	Jacob Ruppert Jr.	1 M	1:44.50	$3,850
1894	Hornpipe	Fred Taral	William Lakeland	James R. & Foxhall P. Keene	1 M	1:43.75	$5,580
1893	Prince George	John Lamley	Hardy Campbell Jr.	Richard Croker	1 M	1:46.00	$3,290
1892	Charade	Edward H. Garrison	William R. Jones	William R. Jones	1 M	1:44.00	$4,510
1891	Russell	Fred Littlefield	R. Wyndham Walden	John A. & Alfred H. Morris	1 M	1:45.00	$4,420
1890	Kenwood	Marty Bergen	W. H. "Dutch" Roller	George Walbaum	1 M	1:42.50	$5,130
1889	Carroll	Fred Littlefield		Joe Cotton	1 M	1:42.50	$4,130
1888	Sir Dixon	Jim McLaughlin	Frank McCabe	Dwyer Brothers Stable	1 M	1:56.75	$1,955
1887	Hanover	Jim McLaughlin	Frank McCabe	Dwyer Brothers Stable	1 M	1:43.25	$2,070
