= Clover Stakes =

Horse race in New York, U.S.

- Class: Discontinued stakes
- Location: Gravesend Race Track; Gravesend, Brooklyn, New York (1888–1910); Aqueduct Racetrack, South Ozone Park, Queens, New York (1914–1932)
- Inaugurated: 1888
- Race type: Thoroughbred – Flat racing

Race information
- Distance: 5 furlongs
- Surface: Dirt
- Track: left-handed
- Qualification: Two-year-old fillies

The Clover Stakes was an American Thoroughbred horse race run forty-one times at New York State's Gravesend and Aqueduct racetracks between 1888 and 1932. A race for two-year-old fillies, it was contested over a distance of five furlongs on dirt.

The first Clover Stakes was hosted by Gravesend Race Track from inception in 1888 and run through 1908 and then for a last time in 1910. Passage of the Hart–Agnew anti-betting legislation by the New York Legislature under Governor Charles Evans Hughes led to a compete shutdown of racing in 1911 and 1912 in the state. A February 21, 1913 ruling by the New York Supreme Court, Appellate Division saw horse racing return in 1913. However, it was too late for the Gravesend horse racing facility and it never reopened.

Picked up by the operators of the Aqueduct Racetrack, the Clover Stakes returned in 1914 and would run continuously through 1932. The valuable race then fell victim to the effects of the Great Depression in the United States which forced track owners to cut costs dramatically and eliminate some events in order to provide funding support for others.

The final edition was run on June 15, 1932, and was won by Sonny Whitney's Disdainful, stablemate of his Champion and U.S. Racing Hall of Fame inductee Top Flight who won the 1931 running of the Clover Stakes.

== Records ==
Speed record:

- 0:58 flat @ 5 furlongs : Top Flight (1931)
- 0:55 2/5 @ 4.5 furlongs : Sweet Lavender (1900)

Most wins by a jockey:

- 3 – Fred Littlefield (1890, 1894, 1900)

Most wins by a trainer:

- 6 – James G. Rowe Sr. (1888, 1907, 1908, 1916, 1917, 1923)

Most wins by an owner:

- 6 – Harry Payne Whitney (1916, 1919, 1923, 1924, 1926, 1929)

== Winners ==
Year	Winner	Age	Jockey	Trainer	Owner	Dist. (Miles)	Time	Win$
1932	Disdainful	2	Raymond Workman	Fred Hopkins	Cornelius Vanderbilt Whitney	5 F	0:59.60	$4,500
1931	Top Flight	2	Alfred Robertson	T. J. Healey	Cornelius Vanderbilt Whitney	5 F	0:58.00	$5,775
1930	Ladana	2	Laverne Fator	Frank M. Taylor	Rancocas Stable	5 F	1:01.20	$6,600
1929	Murky Cloud	2	Raymond Workman	Fred Hopkins	Harry Payne Whitney	5 F	1:00.00	$6,200
1928	Orissa	2	Laverne Fator	Sam Hildreth	Rancocas Stable	5 F	1:00.40	$6,150
1927	Princess Tina	2	George Fields	Robert Augustus Smith	Audley Farm Stable	5 F	0:59.60	$5,675
1926	Pandera	2	Linus McAtee	Fred Hopkins	Harry Payne Whitney	5 F	1:00.40	$5,675
1925	Friar's Carse	2	Albert Johnson	Gwyn R. Tompkins	Glen Riddle Farm	5 F	1:00.40	$4,850
1924	Maud Muller	2	John Maiben	Fred Hopkins	Harry Payne Whitney	5 F	0:58.60	$4,650
1923	Initiate	2	Linus McAtee	James G. Rowe Sr.	Harry Payne Whitney	5 F	0:58.60	$5,225
1922	Sally's Alley	2	Albert Johnson	Eugene Wayland	Willis Sharpe Kilmer	5 F	0:59.00	$4,875
1921	Budana	2	Earl Sande	Sam Hildreth	Rancocas Stable	5 F	0:59.80	$4,725
1920	Careful	2	Willie Kelsay	Eugene Wayland	Walter J. Salmon Sr.	5 F	0:59.00	$3,150
1919	Panoply	2	Eddie Ambrose	Albert Simons	Harry Payne Whitney	5 F	0:59.80	$2,825
1918	Elfin Queen	2	Lawrence Lyke	William H. Karrick	Oneck Stable	5 F	0:58.40	$2,825
1917	Rosie O'Grady	2	Frank Robinson	James G. Rowe Sr.	Lewis S. Thompson	5 F	1:00.40	$2,850
1916	Bonnie Witch	2	Lee Mink	James G. Rowe Sr.	Harry Payne Whitney	5 F	0:59.00	$1,925
1915	Celandria	2	Merritt C. Buxton	James A. McLaughlin	Elkwood Park Stable	5 F	1:04.40	$1,525
1914	Coquette	2	Merritt C. Buxton	George M. Odom	Brookside Stable	5 F	1:00.40	$1,160
1913	Racetrack ceased operations due to the Hart–Agnew Law.							
1912	No races held due to the Hart–Agnew Law.							
1911	No races held due to the Hart–Agnew Law.							
1910	Horizon	2	Stanley H. Davis	Frank Ernest	Richard F. Carman	5 F	1:01.00	$1,900
1909	Race not held							
1908	Melisande	2	Joe Notter	James G. Rowe Sr.	James R. Keene	5 F	1:00.00	$2,495
1907	Meggs Hill	2	Joe Notter	James G. Rowe Sr.	James R. Keene	5 F	1:01.00	$2,695
1906	Adoration	2	Walter Miller	T. J. Healey	Richard T. Wilson Jr.	5 F	1:01.80	$2,015
1905	Transmute	2	Tommy Burns	Sam Hildreth	Edward E. Smathers	5 F	1:03.00	$2,525
1904	Chrysitis	2	Frank O'Neill	Fred Burlew	Pierre Lorillard IV	5 F	1:02.80	$2,710
1903	Contentious	2	Willie Gannon	R. Wyndham Walden	R. Wyndham Walden	5 F	1:01.00	$2,275
1902	Martie Lewis	2	George M. Odom	Peter G. Wimmer	Samuel S. Brown	5 F	1:00.60	$1,850
1901	Disadvantage	2	Lewis Smith	Arthur Carter	J. W. Smythe	5 F	1:03.20	$1,450
1900	Sweet Lavender	2	Fred Littlefield	Charles S. Littlefield Jr.	Charles Sr. & Barry Littlefield	4.5 F	0:55.40	$1,450
1899	Oneck Queen	2	Alonzo Clayton	Walter C. Rollins	Oneck Stable	4.5 F	0:56.00	$1,450
1898	High Degree	2	Tod Sloan	David Gideon	John Daly & David Gideon	4.5 F	0:56.75	$1,450
1897	Fayida	2	Skeets Martin	Albert Cooper	William A. Chanler	4.5 F	0:57.00	$1,420
1896	Winged Foot	2	John J. McCafferty	John J. McCafferty	John J. McCafferty	4.5 F	0:55.50	$2,550
1895	Axiom	2	John Lamley	Frank McCabe	Philip J. Dwyer	5 F	1:03.00	$1,790
1894	Ridicule	2	Fred Littlefield	R. Wyndham Walden	John A., Alfred H., Dave H. Morris	5 F	1:05.00	$1,550
1893	Kentigerna	2	Willie Simms		Madison Stable (Ed Kelly)	5 F	1:03.75	$2,950
1892	Rain Drop	2	Fred Taral		Brookwood Stable	5 F	1:05.00	$2,265
1891	Mount Vernon	2	Fred Taral	C. Thomas Jr.	Northampton Stable (William L. Scott)	5 F	1:04.00	$2,375
1890	Correction	2	Fred Littlefield	R. Wyndham Walden	John A. & Alfred H. Morris	5 F	1:06.75	$3,445
1889	Reclare	2	Johnny Reagan	Henry Warnke Jr.	Warnke & Son	5 F	1:04.75	$3,040
1888	Fides	2	P. Godfrey	James G. Rowe Sr.	August Belmont Sr.	5 F	1:03.75	$2,100
