= First Special Stakes =

- Class: Discontinued stakes
- Location: Gravesend Race Track; Gravesend, Coney Island, NY
- Inaugurated: 1886-1909
- Race type: Thoroughbred - Flat racing

Race information
- Distance: 1¼ miles (10 furlongs)
- Surface: Dirt
- Track: left-handed
- Qualification: Three-years-old and up

The First Special Stakes was an American Thoroughbred horse race run between 1886 and 1909 at Gravesend Race Track in Gravesend, on Coney Island, New York. The race was run on dirt at a distance of one and one-quarter miles and was open to horses of either sex age three and older since 1887.

== Historical notes ==
The 1886 inaugural running was for three-year-olds only and the one time it was raced at one and one-half miles. There were just two horses participating in the 1886 race won by Dewdrop who beat that year's Kentucky Derby winner Ben Ali.

In 1887, the race marked the beginning of an important event for older horses with the First Special Stakes attracting the top horses to such an extent that 14 of the 24 editions of the race were won by Champions. Fair Play, one of the non-champions who is best known today as the sire of Man o' War, won the 1908 running in track record time.

== Demise of the First Special Stakes ==
After years of uncertainty, on June 11, 1908, the Republican controlled New York Legislature under Governor Charles Evans Hughes passed the Hart–Agnew anti-betting legislation with penalties allowing for fines and up to a year in prison. The owners of Gravesend Race Track, and other racing facilities in New York State, struggled to stay in business without income from betting. Racetrack operators had no choice but to drastically reduce the purse money being paid out which resulted in the cancellation of the Second Special Stakes after 1907 so that limited funds could be used to maintain the purses offered for other high-profile races. Nonetheless for 1908 and 1909 the purse for the First Special Stakes was well less than half of what it had been. Further restrictive legislation was passed by the New York Legislature in 1910 which deepened the financial crisis for track operators and led to a complete shut down of racing across the state during 1911 and 1912. After a 1911 amendment to the law to limit the liability of owners and directors was defeated, every racetrack in New York State shut down. Owners, whose horses of racing age had nowhere to go, began sending them, their trainers and their jockeys to race in England and France. Many ended their racing careers there, and a number remained to become an important part of the European horse breeding industry. Thoroughbred Times reported that more than 1,500 American horses were sent overseas between 1908 and 1913 and that of them, at least 24 were either past, present, or future Champions. When a February 21, 1913 ruling by the New York Supreme Court, Appellate Division ruling saw horse racing return in 1913 it was too late for the Gravesend horse racing facility never reopened.

== Records ==
Speed record:

- 1 1/4 miles : 2:03.40 - Fair Play (1908)

Most wins:

- 3 - Kingston (1888, 1889, 1890)

Most wins by a jockey:

- 3 - Isaac Burns Murphy (1887, 1888, 1889) & Willie Simms (1892, 1894, 1897)

Most wins by a trainer:

- 3 - Frank McCabe (1886, 1888, 1889) & Hardy Campbell Jr. (1890, 1894, 1897)

Most wins by an owner:

- 6 - Dwyer Brothers Stable / Michael F. Dwyer (1886, 1888, 1889, 1890, 1894, 1897)

== Winners ==
Year	Winner	Age	Jockey	Trainer	Owner	Dist. (Miles)	Time	Win$
1909	Fitz Herbert Ŧ	3	Eddie Dugan	Sam Hildreth	Sam Hildreth	1 1/4 M	2:05.20	$2,300
1908	Fair Play	3	Eddie Dugan	A. Jack Joyner	August Belmont Jr.	1 1/4 M	2:03.40	$2,250
1907	Ballot Ŧ	3	David Nicol	James G. Rowe Sr.	James R. Keene	1 1/4 M	2:07.00	$5,000
1906	Cottontown	3	Leroy Williams	Auval John Baker	Patrick J. Millett	1 1/4 M	2:05.60	$5,250
1905	Colonial Girl	6	LaVerne Sewell	Charles E. Rowe	Charles E. Rowe	1 1/4 M	2:07.80	$4,800
1904	Beldame Ŧ	3	Frank O'Neill	Fred Burlew	Newton Bennington (Lessee)	1 1/4 M	2:06.00	$4,950
1903	McChesney	4	Grover Fuller	Frank M. Taylor	Edward E. Smathers	1 1/4 M	2:08.00	$4,920
1902	Hermis Ŧ	3	George M. Odom	John H. McCormack	Louis V. Bell	1 1/4 M	2:06.20	$2,875
1901	Advance Guard	4	Tommy Burns	Alexander Shields	James Carruthers & Alexander Shields	1 1/4 M	2:08.00	$2,825
1900	Kinley Mack Ŧ	4	Patrick McCue	Peter Wimmer	Augustus Eastin & Samuel Edward Larabie	1 1/4 M	2:08.20	$2,475
1899	Imp Ŧ	5	Peter Clay	Charles E. Brossman	Daniel R. Harness	1 1/4 M	2:09.80	$2,875
1898	Briar Sweet Ŧ	3	Danny Maher	Walter B. Jennings	Walter B. Jennings	1 1/4 M	2:07.25	$2,650
1897	Ben Brush Ŧ	4	Willie Simms	Hardy Campbell Jr.	Michael F. Dwyer	1 1/16 M	1:48.25	$1,850
1896	Flying Dutchman	4	Skeets Martin	Patrick Dunne	Patrick Dunne	1 1/4 M	2:09.25	$1,850
1895	Henry of Navarre Ŧ	3	Henry Griffin	John J. Hyland	August Belmont Jr.	1 1/4 M	2:09.00	$1,850
1894	Banquet	7	Willie Simms	Hardy Campbell Jr.	Michael F. Dwyer	1 1/4 M	2:15.50	$2,650
1893	Lamplighter Ŧ	4	Fred Taral	John Huggins	Rancocas Stable (Pierre Lorillard)	1 1/4 M	2:13.50	$2,850
1892	Lamplighter Ŧ	3	Willie Simms	John W. Rogers	Samuel S. Brown	1 1/4 M	2:09.25	$5,000
1891	Tenny	5	Shelby Barnes	William H. Karrick	David T. Pulsifer	1 1/4 M	2:09.25	$4,700
1890	Kingston Ŧ	6	Jim McLaughlin	Hardy Campbell Jr.	Michael F. Dwyer	1 1/4 M	2:09.25	$4,650
1889	Kingston Ŧ	5	Isaac Burns Murphy	Frank McCabe	Dwyer Brothers Stable	1 1/4 M	2:06.50	$4,550
1888	Kingston Ŧ	4	Isaac Burns Murphy	Frank McCabe	Dwyer Brothers Stable	1 1/4 M	2:11.25	$2,640
1887	Volante	5	Isaac Burns Murphy	Albert Cooper	Lucky Baldwin	1 1/4 M	2:12.00	$2,800
1886	Dewdrop	3	Jim McLaughlin	Frank McCabe	Dwyer Brothers Stable	1 1/2 M	2:41.00	$2,850

Ŧ denotes a Champion.
