= John Bullman =

American racing jockey

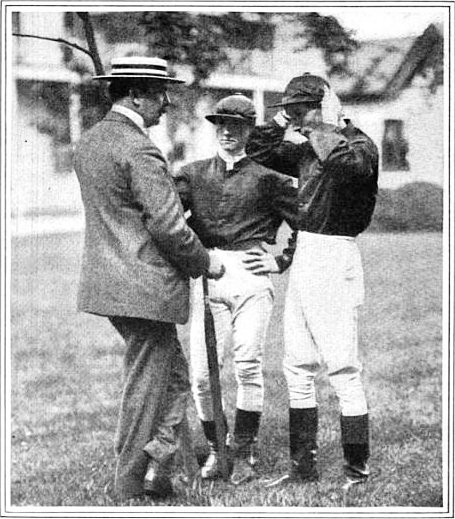
- August Belmont Jr. (left) with jockeys Andy Minder (center) and John Bullman at Sheepshead Bay Race Track in 1903.

Personal information
- Born: c. 1870 Ireland
- Died: March 6, 1922 Saranac Lake, New York, USA
- Resting place: Holy Cross Cemetery, Brooklyn, New York
- Occupation: Jockey

Horse racing career
- Sport: Horse racing
- Career wins: 671

Major racing wins
- Daisy Stakes (1899); Palace Hotel Handicap (1899); Sheepshead Bay Handicap (1899); Thornton Stakes (1899); American Derby (1900, 1901); Annual Champion Stakes (1900); Expectation Stakes (1900); Fall Handicap (1900); Great Eastern Handicap (1900); Matron Stakes (1900); New Rochelle Handicap (1900); Oakwood Handicap (1900, 1901); Reapers Stakes (1900); Belles Stakes (1901); California Oaks (1901, 1903); United States Hotel Stakes (1901); Broadway Stakes (1902); Eclipse Stakes (1902); Juvenile Stakes (1902); National Stallion Stakes (1902, 1903); Astoria Stakes (1903); Great Filly Stakes (1903); Lawrence Realization Stakes (1903); Mermaid Stakes (1903); Montgomery Handicap (1903); Toboggan Handicap (1903); Tremont Stakes (1903); Vernal Stakes (1903); Youthful Stakes (1903) American Classic Race wins: Belmont Stakes (1902, 1903)

Significant horses
- Africander, Beldame, David Garrick, Masterman, Mizzen, Old England, Sidney Lucas
- Updated on September 26, 2018

John Joseph Bullman (c.1870 – March 6, 1922) was an American Thoroughbred horse racing jockey who competed at racetracks across the United States.

Riding at tracks on the American East Coast, in 1900 Bullman won the Matron Stakes at Morris Park Racecourse in The Bronx, New York then later that year won the American Derby at Washington Park Race Track in Chicago before going west in the late fall to compete at Tanforan Racetrack in San Bruno, California near San Francisco.

In 1901 Bullman won his second straight American Derby then in 1902 won the first of two consecutive editions of the Belmont Stakes at Morris Park Racecourse. Records show he continued to race on the West Coast during the winter months and in 1907 was in Los Angeles, California. Bullman was the first jockey to win purses totaling one million dollars in one season. One day he won all eight races.

== Family ==
In 1900, Bullman married Mary Agnes Herbert of San Francisco. The couple had three sons, John Jr. (Jack), Spencer, and Herbert (Buddy), plus a daughter, Mary Esther. His sons were jockeys. Spencer was most successful but was seriously injured during a race which ended his career. His youngest son Herbert (Buddy/Beau) Bullman served decades in the United States Navy achieving the Rank of Chief Petty Officer. He survived the Japanese attack on Pearl Harbor and later numerous airborne missions in the Pacific Theatre and the South-East Asian theatre of World War II.

== Passing ==
Bullman died from tuberculosis in Saranac Lake, New York in 1922 at age 52 after a lengthy illness. He was interred in the Holy Cross Cemetery in Brooklyn, New York.
