= Surf Stakes =

- Class: Discontinued stakes
- Location: Sheepshead Bay Race Track; Sheepshead Bay, Brooklyn, New York, United States
- Inaugurated: 1880–1910
- Race type: Thoroughbred – Flat racing

Race information
- Distance: 5 furlongs (5/8 mile)
- Surface: Dirt
- Track: left-handed
- Qualification: Two-year-olds

The Surf Stakes was an American Thoroughbred horse race held annually for thirty-one years from 1880 through 1910 on the dirt course at Sheepshead Bay Race Track in Sheepshead Bay, Brooklyn, New York. A race for two-year-olds of either sex, it was last run at a distance of 5 1/2 furlongs but from inception through 1895 it was contested at five furlongs.

== Historical notes ==
The 1880 inaugural edition of the Surf Stakes was won by George Lorillard's filly Spinaway that had the Grade 1 Spinaway Stakes at Saratoga Race Course named in her honor. Her performances in 1880 led to Spinaway being retrospectively selected by Thoroughbred Heritage as that year's American Champion Two-Year-Old Female.

Tremont, owned by the Dwyer Brothers Stable who notoriously over-raced their horses, came into the June 12, 1886 running having won the Foam Stakes two days earlier. Tremont went on to an undefeated Championship two-year-old campaign in which he won all thirteen of his starts but never raced again.

Owner and trainer Byron McClelland won the 1890 race with Sallie McClelland which he had named for his wife. The filly too would be retrospectively selected by Thoroughbred Heritage as that year's American Champion Two-Year-Old Female.

Hastings was a surprise winner of the 1895 edition, beating the heavily favored Handspring by three lengths. A month later, Hastings would be sold at auction to August Belmont Jr. for a then record price of $37,000.

En route to a career that would see his induction into the U.S. Racing Hall of Fame, Peter Pan won the 1906 Surf Stakes.

== The end of a race and of a racetrack ==
On June 11, 1908, the Republican controlled New York Legislature under Governor Charles Evans Hughes passed the Hart–Agnew anti-betting legislation. The owners of Sheepshead Bay Race Track, and other racing facilities in New York State, struggled to stay in business without income from betting. Racetrack operators had no choice but to drastically reduce the purse money being paid out which resulted in the Surf Stakes offering a purse in 1909 that was more than ninety percent less than what it had been the previous year. These small purses made horse racing unprofitable and impossible for even the most successful horse owners to continue in business. As such, for the 1910 racing season management of the Sheepshead Bay facility dropped some of its minor stakes races and used the purse money to bolster more most important events such as the Surf Stakes.

In spite of strong opposition by prominent owners such as August Belmont, Jr. and Harry Payne Whitney, reform legislators were not happy when they learned that betting was still going on at racetracks between individuals and they had further restrictive legislation passed by the New York Legislature in 1910. The Agnew–Perkins Law, a series of four bills and recorded as the Executive Liability Act, made it possible for racetrack owners and members of its board of directors to be fined and imprisoned if anyone was found betting, even privately, anywhere on their premises. After a 1911 amendment to the law that would limit the liability of owners and directors was defeated, every racetrack in New York State shut down. As a result, the Surf Stakes was not run in 1911 and 1912.

Owners, whose horses of racing age had nowhere to go, began sending them, their trainers and their jockeys to race in England and France. Many horses ended their racing careers there and a number remained to become an important part of the European horse breeding industry. Thoroughbred Times reported that more than 1,500 American horses were sent overseas between 1908 and 1913 and of them at least 24 were either past, present, or future Champions. When a February 21, 1913 ruling by the New York Supreme Court, Appellate Division Court saw horse racing return in 1913. However, it was too late for the Sheepshead Bay horse racing facility and it never reopened.

== Records ==
Speed record:

- 1:00.40 @ 5 furlongs – Hastings (1895)
- 1:06.80 @ 5.5 furlongs – Mombassa (1907)

Most wins by a jockey:

- 2 – Lloyd Hughes (1880, 1882)
- 2 – Jim McLaughlin (1885, 1886)
- 2 – Spyder Anderson (1889, 1890)
- 2 – Henry Griffin (1894, 1895)
- 2 – Fred Littlefield (1897, 1900)
- 2 – Willie Shaw (1901, 1904)

Most wins by a trainer:

- 5 – James G. Rowe Sr. (1887, 1906, 1908, 1910)

Most wins by an owner:

- 3 – Michael F. Dwyer / Dwyer Brothers Stable (1885, 1886, 1892)
- 3 – Philip J. Dwyer / Dwyer Brothers Stable (1885, 1886, 1893)

== Winners ==
| Year | Winner | Age | Jockey | Trainer | Owner | Dist. (Miles) | Time | Win$ |
|---|---|---|---|---|---|---|---|---|
| 1910 | Lahore | 2 | James Butwell | James G. Rowe Sr. | James R. Keene | 5.5 F | 1:07.20 | $2,170 |
| 1909 | Dalmatian | 2 | Vincent Powers | Sam Hildreth | Sam Hildreth | 5.5 F | 1:08.00 | $330 |
| 1908 | Suffragette | 2 | Joe Notter | James G. Rowe Sr. | James G. Rowe Sr. | 5.5 F | 1:07.00 | $3,970 |
| 1907 | Mombassa | 2 | George Mountain | John W. Rogers | Harry Payne Whitney | 5.5 F | 1:06.80 | $4,880 |
| 1906 | Peter Pan | 2 | Herman Radtke | James G. Rowe Sr. | James R. Keene | 5.5 F | 1:07.00 | $5,010 |
| 1905 | Inquisitor | 2 | Jack Martin | Thomas Welsh | Andrew Miller | 5.5 F | 1:07.40 | $3,920 |
| 1904 | Sparkling Star | 2 | Willie Shaw | T. J. Healey | Richard T. Wilson Jr. | 5.5 F | 1:08.00 | $4,350 |
| 1903 | Inflexible | 2 | Tommy Burns | John W. Rogers | William Collins Whitney | 5.5 F | 1:07.00 | $5,385 |
| 1902 | Monte Carlo | 2 | George M. Odom | Walter N. House | J. Grant Lyman | 5.5 F | 1:10.00 | $4,015 |
| 1901 | Smart Set | 2 | Willie Shaw | Thomas Welsh | Julius Fleischmann | 5.5 F | 1:07.40 | $3,080 |
| 1900 | Watercolor | 2 | Fred Littlefield | Charles Littlefield Jr. | Charles Littlefield Jr. | 5.5 F | 1:07.20 | $3,320 |
| 1899 | Missionary | 2 | Winfield O'Connor | Julius J. Bauer | Bromley & Co. (Joseph E. Bromley & Arthur Featherstone) | 5.5 F | 1:08.80 | $3,330 |
| 1898 | Autumn | 2 | Tod Sloan | A. Jack Joyner | A. Jack Joyner | 5.5 F | 1:07.20 | $3,155 |
| 1897 | Varus | 2 | Fred Littlefield | R. Wyndham Walden | Alfred H. & Dave H. Morris | 5.5 F | 1:09.40 | $2,950 |
| 1896 | Lithos | 2 | Mr. Hart | Lew Ellmore | Trowbridge & Co. (Samuel Trowbridge) | 5 F | 1:02.40 | $1,425 |
| 1895 | Hastings | 2 | Henry Griffin | John J. Hyland | David Gideon & John Daly | 5 F | 1:00.40 | $4,525 |
| 1894 | Keenan | 2 | Henry Griffin | John J. Hyland | August Belmont Jr. | 5 F | 1:01.00 | $3,825 |
| 1893 | Declare | 2 | Willie Simms | Frank McCabe | Philip J. Dwyer & Son | 5 F | 1:02.60 | $4,625 |
| 1892 | Hammie | 2 | Fred Taral | Hardy Campbell Jr. | Michael F. Dwyer | 5 F | 1:02.40 | $3,775 |
| 1891 | Merry Monarch | 2 | Marty Bergen | John J. Hyland | David Gideon | 5 F | 1:04.00 | $4,150 |
| 1890 | Sallie McClelland | 2 | Spyder Anderson | Byron McClelland | Byron McClelland | 5 F | 1:02.60 | $3,950 |
| 1889 | Torso | 2 | Spyder Anderson | Charles Leighton | William Lawrence Scott | 5 F | 1:01.80 | $4,975 |
| 1888 | Reporter | 2 | P. Godfrey | John W. Rogers | Samuel S. Brown | 5 F | 1:02.75 | $3,600 |
| 1887 | Magnetizer | 2 | Mr. Link | James G. Rowe Sr. | August Belmont Sr. | 5 F | 1:02.00 | $3,800 |
| 1886 | Tremont | 2 | Jim McLaughlin | Frank McCabe | Dwyer Brothers Stable | 5 F | 1:02.00 | $2,875 |
| 1885 | Portland | 2 | Jim McLaughlin | Frank McCabe | Dwyer Brothers Stable | 5 F | 1:03.50 | $2,475 |
| 1884 | Wanda | 2 | Harris Olney | Matthew Byrnes | Pierre Lorillard IV | 5 F | 1:03.00 | $3.075 |
| 1883 | Thackeray | 2 | James Brennan | R. Wyndham Walden | George L. Lorillard | 5 F | 1:03.00 | $2,950 |
| 1882 | Jacobus | 2 | Lloyd Hughes | Richard Dwyer | James E. Kelley | 5 F | 1:05.00 | $2,525 |
| 1881 | Marsh Redon | 2 | William Donohue | Barney Riley | David D. Withers | 5 F | 1:03.25 | $2,525 |
| 1880 | Spinaway | 2 | Lloyd Hughes | R. Wyndham Walden | George L. Lorillard | 5 F | 1:04.25 | $2,025 |
