= Astoria Stakes =

- Class: Non-Listed Black Type
- Location: Belmont Park; Elmont, New York, USA
- Inaugurated: 1902
- Race type: Thoroughbred – Flat racing
- Website: www.nyra.com/index_belmont.html

Race information
- Distance: 5 1/2 furlongs
- Surface: Dirt
- Qualification: Two-year-old fillies
- Weight: 120 pounds Non winners of a race other than claiming or starter allowed 3 lbs.; Maidens, 5 lbs.
- Purse: US $150,000 (2019)

The Astoria Stakes is a long-lived race for two-year-old Thoroughbred fillies run at Belmont Park in early June during the Belmont Stakes carnival. Originally set at a distance of five furlongs, beginning in the year 1940, the event was increased to five and a half furlongs on the dirt. The race currently offers a $150,000 purse.

This race began at Gravesend Race Track in 1902 where it stayed until 1910. It then moved to Aqueduct Racetrack to be contested from 1914 to 1955, and again from 1960 to 1974. It was at Jamaica Race Course 1956, 1958, and 1959.

From 1985 through 1994 the Astoria Stakes held Grade III status.

Named after a neighborhood in the New York City borough of Queens, it would have been in its 103rd running in 2009, but due to the 2008 financial crisis, the Astoria was canceled by the NYRA as they adjusted races to meet the new Grade I standard purse of $300,000. The race was run again in 2014 as an overnight stakes.

== Records ==
- At 5 and a half furlongs : 1:02.80, Ruffian (1974) – North American record for a two-year-old.
- At 5 furlongs : 0:58 flat, Panoply (1919)

Most wins by a jockey:

- 5 – Eddie Arcaro (1940, 1947, 1951, 1955, 1956)
- 5 – Jorge Velásquez (1973, 1977, 1980, 1985, 1991)
- 5 – Jerry Bailey (1979, 1992, 1994, 1996, 2004)
- 5 – John Velasquez (2000, 2007, 2014, 2016, 2021)

Most wins by a trainer:

- 5 – Todd Pletcher (1997, 2005, 2007, 2014, 2016)

Most wins by an owner:

- 4 – Harry Payne Whitney (1919, 1920, 1924, 1926)
- 4 – Cornelius Vanderbilt Whitney (1932, 1945, 1946, 1947)

== Winners ==
NYRA – Belmont Park Astoria Stakes history:

Year	Winner	Jockey	Trainer	Owner	Dist. (Miles)	Time
2025	Sassy C W	Jareth Loveberry	Larry Rivelli	Patrica’s Hope LLC & Carolyn Wilson	51/2 F	1:06.04
2024	Whatintheliteral	Javier Castellano	Jena M. Antonucci	horseOlogy Racing & Craig Steinhart	51/2 F	1:05.06
2023	Closing Act	Irad Ortiz Jr.	Steven M. Asmussen	Douglas Scharbauer	51/2 F	1:06.59
2022	Devious Dame	Joel Rosario	Norm W. Casse	John C. Oxley	51/2 F	1:04.75
2021	Happy Soul	John Velazquez	Wesley A. Ward	Gayla Rankin	51/2 F	1:05.69
2020	Race not held due to COVID-19					
2019	Maryanorginger	Jorge Vargas Jr.	Jeremiah C. Englehart	Gold Square LLC	51/2 F	1:03.94
2018	Athens Queen	Albin Jimenez	Wesley A. Ward	James Reiley McDonald	51/2 F	1:05.37
2017	I Still Miss You	Javier Castellano	Jeremiah C. Englehart	Gold Star Racing Stable	51/2 F	1:04.85
2016	Bode's Dream	John Velazquez	Todd Pletcher	St. Elias Stable	51/2 F	1:03.66
2015	Moment Is Right	Joel Rosario	Wesley A. Ward	Ten Broeck Farm, Inc.	51/2 F	1:04.77
2014	Fashion Alert	John Velazquez	Todd Pletcher	George Bolton & Barry Hall	51/2 F	1:04.01
2009	2013	Race not held				
2008	Bold Union	Stewart Elliott	Kelly J. Breen	George & Lori Hall	51/2 F	1:05.92
2007	Glacken's Gal	John Velazquez	Todd Pletcher	Let's Go Stable	51/2 F	1:03.85
2006	Desire to Excel	Mike Smith	Kelly J. Breen	Dennis Narlinger	51/2 F	1:04.33
2005	Adieu	Rafael Bejarano	Todd Pletcher	Susan Magnier, Michael Tabor, Derrick Smith	51/2 F	1:04.02
2004	Broadway Gold	Jerry Bailey	Stanley M. Hough	Joyce Robsham	51/2 F	1:04.41
2003	Feline Story	Jorge Chavez	Stanley M. Hough	E. Paul Robsham	51/2 F	1:05.14
2002	Mike's Wildcat	José A. Santos	Jeffrey L. Bonde	Dennis Narlinger	51/2 F	1:03.99
2001	Touch Love	Jorge Chavez	Anthony W. Dutrow	Skeedattle Stable	51/2 F	1:05.65
2000	Raging Fever	John Velazquez	Mark A. Hennig	Edward P. Evans	51/2 F	1:04.25
1999	Finder's Fee	Mike Smith	C. R. McGaughey III	Ogden Phipps	51/2 F	1:04.71
1998	Round Robin	Pat Day	Bernard S. Flint	Bertram Klein, et al.	51/2 F	1:04.80
1997	Jersey Girl	Mike Smith	Todd Pletcher	Ackerley Bros. Farm	51/2 F	1:06.00
1996	Aces	Jerry Bailey	Frank L. Brothers	Cherry Valley Farm, et al.	51/2 F	1:05.20
1995	Zee Lady	José A. Santos	Linda L. Rice	Mchael Eiserman, Kenneth Fishbein, Earl Silver	51/2 F	1:05.85
1994	Unacceptable	Jerry Bailey	Philip M. Hauswald	Ward C. Pitfield Jr.	51/2 F	1:03.98
1993	Casa Eire	José A. Santos	Leo O'Brien	Bernard Connaughton	51/2 F	1:05.29
1992	Distinct Habit	Jerry Bailey	Stanley M. Hough	Triumviri Stable	51/2 F	1:04.47
1991	Forever Land	Jorge Velásquez	Richard E. Dutrow Sr.	George Elphand	51/2 F	1:04.80
1990	Meadow Star	José A. Santos	LeRoy Jolley	Carl Icahn	51/2 F	1:04.20
1989	Lucy's Glory	Angel Santiago	Alfredo Callejas	Robert M. Perez	51/2 F	1:06.00
1988	Seattle Meteor	Randy Romero	Ross Pearce	Buckland Farm	51/2 F	1:05.60
1987	Joe's Tammie	Jerry Belmonte	H. Allen Jerkens	Suzanne Moscarelli	51/2 F	1:05.60
1986	Tara Tower	Julio Espinoza	Stanley M. Hough	Stanley M. Hough	51/2 F	1:04.60
1985	Twilight Ridge	Jorge Velásquez	D. Wayne Lukas	Eugene V. Klein	51/2 F	1:04.40
1984	Faster Than Fast	Robbie Davis	Howard M. Tesher	Craig B. Singer	51/2 F	1:05.20
1983	Hot Milk	Don MacBeth	Thomas Joseph Kelly	Edward P. Evans	51/2 F	1:04.60
1982	Gala Jubilee	Rudy Turcotte	Bernard P. Bond	Mrs. Leonard T. Leviton	51/2 F	1:05.20
1981	Chilling Thought	Jeffrey Fell	LeRoy Jolley	Diana Firestone	51/2 F	1:05.00
1980	Famous Partner	Jorge Velásquez	John P. Campo	Buckland Farm	51/2 F	1:05.00
1979	Accipiter's Dream	Jerry Bailey	Del W. Carroll	William S. Farish III	51/2 F	1:04.80
1978	Whisper Fleet	Jean Cruguet	Thomas Joseph Kelly	Townsend B. Martin	51/2 F	1:04.40
1977	Akita	Jorge Velásquez	Willard C. Freeman	Marie A. Moore	51/2 F	1:05.20
1976	Squander	Eddie Maple	John W. Russell	Ogden Mills Phipps	51/2 F	1:05.40
1975	Dearly Precious	Michael Hole	Stephen A. DiMauro	Richard E. Bailey	51/2 F	1:04.20
1974	Ruffian	Vincent Bracciale Jr.	Frank Y. Whiteley Jr.	Locust Hill Farm	51/2 F	1:02.80
1973	What Brilliance	Jorge Velásquez	James J. Toner	Joseph W. La Croix	51/2 F	1:03.80
1972	Queen's Mark	Braulio Baeza	John P. Campo	Elmendorf Farm	51/2 F	1:04.60
1971	Brenda Beauty	Robert Woodhouse	Robert P. Lake	Birchfield Farm	51/2 F	1:04.80
1970	Bonnie And Gay	Jacinto Vásquez	James E. Picou	Mrs. John O. Burgwin	51/2 F	1:05.20
1969	Sadie F.	Hedley Woodhouse	Paul A. Healy	Philip Godfrey	51/2 F	1:04.20
1968	Show Off	Jesse Davidson	Willard C. Freeman	Alfred G. Vanderbilt	51/2 F	1:04.00
1967	Queen of the Stage	Braulio Baeza	Edward A. Neloy	Ogden Phipps	51/2 F	1:03.60
1966	Northwest Trades	Larry Adams	James P. Conway	Mrs. James P. Conway	51/2 F	1:04.40
1965	Native Street	Manuel Ycaza	Les Lear	Abraham I. Savin	51/2 F	1:04.20
1964	Queen Empress	Braulio Baeza	William C. Winfrey	Wheatley Stable	51/2 F	1:04.20
1963	Miss Twist	Manuel Ycaza	Edward A. Neloy	Nanuet Farm	51/2 F	1:04.80
1962	Affectionately	Braulio Baeza	Hirsch Jacobs	Ethel D. Jacobs	51/2 F	1:04.60
1961	Polylady	Manuel Ycaza	William O. Hicks	Woodvale Farm	51/2 F	1:03.80
1960	Little Tumbler	Charles Burr	William R. Mitchell	Meadowbrook Stable	51/2 F	1:04.60
1959	Rose of Serro	George Gibb	William A. Larue	B. A. Dario	51/2 F	1:05.40
1958	Cobul	Willie Lester	Philip Bieber	Mrs. Nicholas Schenck	51/2 F	1:05.60
1957	Poly Hi	Eric Guerin	Thomas Mercer Waller	Mrs. George Zauderer	51/2 F	1:03.60
1956	Leallah	Eddie Arcaro	MacKenzie Miller	Charlton Clay	51/2 F	1:04.60
1955	Scansion	Eddie Arcaro	Casey Hayes	Christopher Chenery	51/2 F	1:06.20
1954	Trying	Jimmy Nichols	James W. Maloney	William Haggin Perry	51/2 F	1:06.40
1953	Case Goods	Hedley Woodhouse	William C. Winfrey	William Goadby Loew	51/2 F	1:05.80
1952	Home-Made	Eric Guerin	William C. Winfrey	Alfred G. Vanderbilt	51/2 F	1:05.60
1951	Star-Enfin	Eddie Arcaro	George H. Strate	Brae Burn Farm (James O. McCue)	51/2 F	1:05.80
1950	Sungari	Ovie Scurlock	Winbert F. Mulholland	George D. Widener Jr.	51/2 F	1:07.00
1949	Baby Comet	Albert Schmidl	R. Emmett Potts	Peter A. Markey	51/2 F	1:07.00
1948	Eternal Flag	Ted Atkinson	Frank Catrone	Allen T. Simmons	51/2 F	1:06.40
1947	Mackinaw	Eddie Arcaro	Sylvester Veitch	Cornelius Vanderbilt Whitney	51/2 F	1:05.40
1946	First Flight	Paul Miller	Sylvester Veitch	Cornelius Vanderbilt Whitney	51/2 F	1:04.60
1945	Mush Mush	Arnold Kirkland	Sylvester Veitch	Cornelius Vanderbilt Whitney	51/2 F	1:07.00
1944	Subdued	Eric Guerin	James E. Fitzsimmons	Ogden Phipps	51/2 F	1:06.80
1943	Mrs. Ames	Ted Atkinson	Preston M. Burch	Longchamps Farms	51/2 F	1:07.00
1942	Stefanita	John Breen	Winbert F. Mulholland	George D. Widener Jr.	51/2 F	1:05.80
1941	Flying Indian	Nick Wall	Patrick F. Dwyer	Mrs. Anthony Pelleteri	51/2 F	1:05.40
1940	Tangled †	Eddie Arcaro	John M. Gaver Sr.	Greentree Stable	51/2 F	1:06.60
1939	Now What	Raymond Workman	Joseph H. Stotler	Alfred G. Vanderbilt	5 F	0:58.20
1938	Donita M.	Johnny Longden	Phil Reuter	Longchamps Farms	5 F	0:58.80
1937	Inhale	John Gilbert	James W. Healy	John Hay Whitney	5 F	0:58.80
1936	Manatella	Maurice Peters	Richard E. Handlen	Foxcatcher Farms	5 F	0:59.60
1935	Race not held					
1934	Vicaress †	James Stout	James E. Fitzsimmons	Belair Stud Stable	5 F	0:59.40
1933	Race not held					
1932	Disdainful	Alfred Robertson	Fred Hopkins	Cornelius Vanderbilt Whitney	5 F	1:00.20
1931	Stagecraft	Mack Garner	Henry McDaniel	Joseph E. Widener	5 F	0:59.40
1930	Sovietta	Linus McAtee	A. Jack Joyner	George D. Widener Jr.	5 F	0:59.40
1929	The Spare	John Bejshak	Joseph H. Stotler	Sagamore Stable	5 F	1:02.40
1928	Lady Capulet	Steve O'Donnell	William M. Garth	Samuel Ross	5 F	1:00.00
1927	One Hour	Eddie Ambrose	John Hastings	Joshua S. Cosden	5 F	0:58.20
1926	Pandera	Linus McAtee	James G. Rowe Sr.	Harry P. Whitney	5 F	0:59.60
1925	Edith Cavell	Linus McAtee	Scott Harlan	Walter M. Jeffords Sr.	5 F	0:59.40
1924	Maud Muller	Linus McAtee	James G. Rowe Sr.	Harry P. Whitney	5 F	1:00.40
1923	Fluvanna	George Babin	Max Hirsch	Salubria Stable	5 F	1:00.20
1922	Susweep	Earl Sande	Sam Hildreth	Rancocas Stable	5 F	0:59.00
1921	My Reverie	Clarence Kummer	Dave Robb McDaniel	R. J. "Dick" Brown	5 F	0:58.40
1920	Crocus	Eddie Ambrose	James G. Rowe Sr.	Harry P. Whitney	5 F	1:00.80
1919	Panoply	Willie Knapp	Albert Simons	Harry P. Whitney	5 F	0:58.00
1918	Terentia	Charles Fairbrother	William H. Karrick	William R. Coe	5 F	0:58.20
1917	Stitch in Time	Merritt Buxton	Hollie Hughes	John Sanford	5 F	1:00.80
1916	Tragedy	Tommy Davies	William H. Karrick	Oneck Stable	5 F	1:01.00
1915	Pleione	Joe McCahey	William R. Midgley	Gifford A. Cochran	5 F	0:59.60
1914	Pixy	Joe McCahey	Thomas J. Healey	Montpelier Stable	5 F	0:59.60
1913	Naiad	George Wolfe	Thomas J. Healey	Montpelier Stable	5 F	0:59.60
1912	No races held due to the Hart–Agnew Law.					
1911	No races held due to the Hart–Agnew Law.					
1910	Bashti	Guy Garner	Thomas Welsh	Newcastle Stable	5 F	1:02.00
1909	Ocean Bound	Richard Scoville	French Brooks	Woodford Clay	5 F	1:01.00
1908	Melissa	Joe Notter	Richard O. Miller	Philip J. Dwyer	5 F	1:02.20
1907	Beckon	George Mountain	John E. Madden	Francis R. Hitchcock	5 F	1:01.80
1906	Hyperbole	Willie Knapp	William H. Karrick	Oneck Stable	5 F	1:03.20
1905	Sue Smith	John Martin	Robert Tucker	Samuel S. Brown	5 F	1:03.40
1904	Chrysitis	Frank O'Neill	Fred Burlew	Pierre Lorillard IV	5 F	1:01.20
1903	Ocean Tide	John Bullman	Frank E. Brown	Patrick H. McCarren	5 F	1:03.80
1902	Astarita	Willie Shaw	Harry M. Mason	John G. Follansbee	5 F	1:00.60

- † In 1940, Key Ring dead-heated with Tangled for first but was disqualified.
- † Race run as the Astoria Purse, a non-stakes race.
