= Fitz Herbert =

American-bred Thoroughbred racehorse

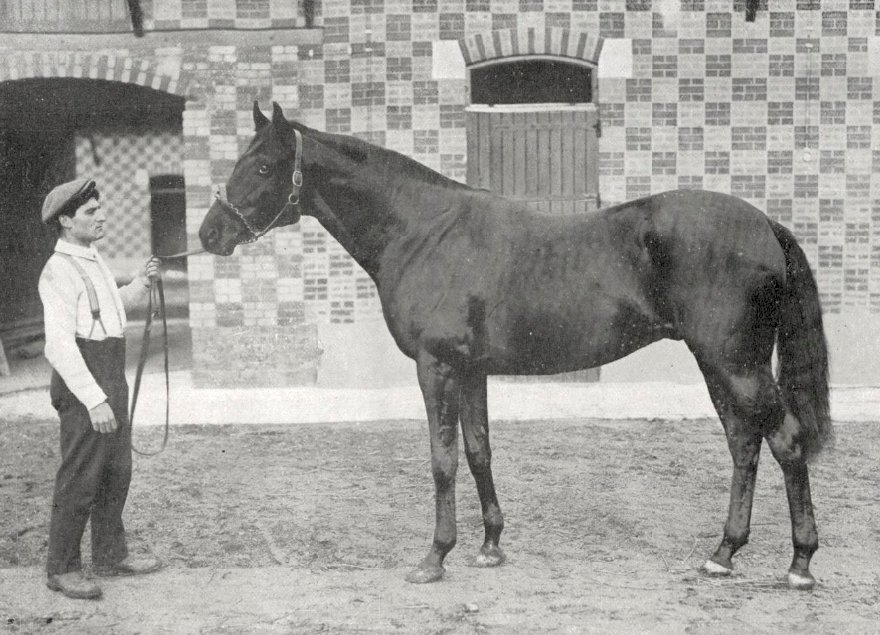
- Fitz Herbert in 1913 at stud in France.
- Sire: Ethelbert
- Grandsire: Eothen
- Dam: Morganatic
- Damsire: Emperor
- Sex: Stallion
- Foaled: 1906
- Country: United States
- Colour: Bay
- Breeder: Perry Belmont
- Owner: 1) A. Jack Joyner; 2) Herman Brandt (1908); 3) Sam Hildreth (1908); 4) Charles Kohler (1910)
- Trainer: Sam Hildreth
- Record: 44: 31-7-3
- Earnings: Not found

Major wins
- Advance Stakes (1909); Bowie Handicap (1909); Broadway Stakes (1909); First Special Stakes (1909); Suburban Handicap (1909); Jerome Handicap (1909); Lawrence Realization Handicap (1909); Brooklyn Handicap (1910)

Awards
- U.S. Champion 3-Yr-Old Colt (1909); U.S. Champion Handicap Horse (1910); Horse of the Year (1909, 1910)
- Last updated on November 18, 2006

Fitz Herbert (1906 – 1926) was an American Thoroughbred National Champion racehorse. Bred by Perry Belmont, he was owned by trainer A. J. Joyner, who sold him in early 1908 to Herman Brandt for $3,500. Later that year, Brandt sold the colt to trainer Sam Hildreth.

For Hildreth, he was ridden by jockey Cal Shilling and was retrospectively awarded back-to-back United States Horse of the Year titles. His major victories came in long races, something his trainer specialized in. In the 1909 Lawrence Realization Handicap, the horse set a world record for a 1-5/8 mile race. His race record in 1909 was fifteen starts with fourteen wins and one second. His only loss came to a filly named Affliction. Lightly raced in 1910, he won two races and finished second in his other two starts.

In a deal described by The New York Times as the "biggest sale in years," in February 1910 Hildreth sold Fitz Herbert for $40,000 to Charles Kohler, owner of Ramapo Stock Farm in Ho-Ho-Kus, New Jersey. Due to the legislated ban on parimutuel betting by the state of New York, a few weeks later Fitz Herbert and other horses owned by Kohler were shipped to stables at Maisons-Laffitte Racecourse in France where he was conditioned to compete in steeplechase racing. Fitz Herbert later stood at stud at Clarence Mackay's Haras de Fresnay farm in Normandy, where he had some success.
