= Bryn Mawr (horse) =

American-bred Thoroughbred racehorse

- Sire: Atheling
- Grandsire: Sterling
- Dam: Maggie Weir
- Damsire: The Bard
- Sex: Colt
- Foaled: 1901
- Country: United States
- Colour: Brown
- Breeder: Goughacres Stud
- Owner: Goughacres Stable
- Trainer: W. Fred Presgrave
- Record: Not found
- Earnings: Not found

Major wins
- Brooklyn Derby (1904); Larchmont Stakes (1904); Broadway Stakes (1904) American Classic Race wins: Preakness Stakes (1904)

Bryn Mawr (1901 – 1923) was an American Thoroughbred racehorse. He is best known for winning the 1904 Preakness Stakes. He was bred by Goughacres Stud in Bryn Mawr, Pennsylvania, owned by B. F. Clyde and his brother William's son, Thomas C. Clyde. They would race him under their Goughacres Stable. Bryn Mawr was sired by Atheling and out of the mare Maggie Weir, a daughter of The Bard.

== Preakness Stakes ==
The twenty-ninth running of the Preakness Stakes was run on Saturday, May 28, 1904. On that day Bryn Mawr went off as the heavy favorite at 3-2 in the field of ten after three colts scratched. In that race, he broke poorly in seventh under a heavy hold by jockey Gene Hildebrand but he steadily made up ground throughout the race, as they hit the clubhouse turn he had edged up into fifth place. The pace of the race was very fast that day with the first quarter in :24 flat and the half in :47-3/5. As the race progressed, Bryn Mawr raced in the group of stalkers behind the leaders and was in third moving into the final turn. He made his move wide on the final turn with some urging from Hildebrand rounded the field.

Near the top of the lane he passed the leaders and wore down front runner Dolly Spanker. In the last sixteenth of a mile, he emerged in front and beat the runner-up by a length going away and stretching the lead with stride. That day Wotan finished second at 7-1 by a scant nose over 7-2 second choice Dolly Spanker in third.

The final time for the one mile and 70 yard race on dirt was 1:44-1/5 over a fast track. Bryn Mawr won almost 60% of the total purse of $4,000 netting earnings $2,355.

== Later racing career ==
Later in his three-year-old season Bryn Mawr went on to win the mile and a half Brooklyn Derby at Gravesend Race Track on Coney Island, New York and the seven furlong Larchmont Stakes at Morris Park Racecourse in Westchester County, New York. He also finished second in the mile Withers Stakes at Aqueduct Race Track.

In his four-year-old season Bryn Mawr won the Broadway Stakes at a mile and one sixteenth at Gravesend Race Track. He also finished third in the one mile and three eighths Advance Stakes also at Sheepshead Bay Race Track.

== Stud career ==
By 1911, Bryn Mawr had been given to the Maryland Breeding Bureau and was a stud horse at the farm of R. J. Walden in Middleburg. Relocated to Canterbury Farms in Saratoga Springs, he was sold for $1,000 in August 1922 to J.H. Lewis. Bryn Mawr died in June 1923 in Cleveland. He was considered to be a good broodmare sire.

== Breeding ==
Pedigree of Bryn Mawr
Sire Atheling br. 1883	Sterling bay 1868	Oxford	Birdcatcher
Sire Atheling br. 1883	Sterling bay 1868	Oxford	Honey Dear
Sire Atheling br. 1883	Sterling bay 1868	Whisper	Flatcatcher
Sire Atheling br. 1883	Sterling bay 1868	Whisper	Silence
Sire Atheling br. 1883	King Tom Mare bay 1868	King Tom	Harkaway
Sire Atheling br. 1883	King Tom Mare bay 1868	King Tom	Pocahontas
Sire Atheling br. 1883	King Tom Mare bay 1868	Bay Middleton Mare	Bay Middleton
Sire Atheling br. 1883	King Tom Mare bay 1868	Bay Middleton Mare	West Country Lass
Dam Maggie Weir ch. 1895	The Bard bay 1883	Longfellow	Leamington*
Dam Maggie Weir ch. 1895	The Bard bay 1883	Longfellow	Nantura
Dam Maggie Weir ch. 1895	The Bard bay 1883	Brademonte	War Dance
Dam Maggie Weir ch. 1895	The Bard bay 1883	Brademonte	Brenna
Dam Maggie Weir ch. 1895	Saphire ch. 1888	Stratford	Leamington*
Dam Maggie Weir ch. 1895	Saphire ch. 1888	Stratford	Susan Beane
Dam Maggie Weir ch. 1895	Saphire ch. 1888	Gem	Macaroon
Dam Maggie Weir ch. 1895	Saphire ch. 1888	Gem	Bijou

* Bryn Mawr is inbred 4D x 4D to the stallion Leamington, meaning that he appears fourth generation twice on the dam side of his pedigree.
