= Daisy Stakes =

- Class: Defunct stakes
- Location: Sheepshead Bay Race Track, Sheepshead Bay, Brooklyn, New York, United States
- Inaugurated: 1890
- Race type: Thoroughbred - Flat racing

Race information
- Distance: 5 furlongs
- Surface: Turf
- Track: left-handed
- Qualification: Two-year-olds

The Daisy Stakes was a Thoroughbred horse race for two-year-olds at Sheepshead Bay Race Track in Sheepshead Bay, Brooklyn, New York. It was contested at a distance of five furlongs on the grass course between 1890 and 1909 with the exception of 1908 when the race was not held as a result of that year's passage of the Hart-Agnew anti-betting legislation by the New York Legislature which would lead to a state-wide shutdown of racing in 1911 and 1912. What would prove be the final edition of the Daisy Stakes took place on June 18, 1910, and was run on the main dirt track.

A February 21, 1913 ruling by the New York Supreme Court, Appellate Division saw horse racing return in 1913. However, the deterioration of the Sheepshead Bay Race Track's financial condition was such that it never reopened.’

== Records ==
Speed record:

- 5 Furlongs on grass course: 1:00.40 - Floretta (1895) & Red River (1906)

Most wins by a jockey:

- 2 - Willie Simms (1893, 1894)
- 2 - Fred Taral (1896, 1897)
- 2 - Patrick A. McCue (1900, 1902)

Most wins by a trainer:

- 2 - Hardy Campbell Jr. (1894, 1898)
- 2 - Matthew Byrnes (1896, 1897)
- 2 - Thomas J. Healey (1900, 1906)

Most wins by an owner:

- 2 - Michael F. Dwyer (1894, 1898)
- 2 - Richard T. Wilson Jr. (1900, 1906)

== Winners ==
| Year | Winner | Jockey | Trainer | Owner | Dist. (Furlongs) | Time | Win$ |
|---|---|---|---|---|---|---|---|
| 1910 | Horizon | Eddie Dugan | Frank Ernest | Richard F. Carman | 5 F (D) | 1:00.00 | $1,210 |
| 1909 | Colinet | Richard Scoville | Gwyn R. Tompkins | Woodford Clay | 5 F (T) | 1:00.80 | $360 |
| 1908 | Race not held due to Hart-Agnew Law | | | | | | |
| 1907 | Notasulga | Herman Radtke | Albert L. Hamel | Albert L. Hamel | 5 F (T) | 1:01.00 | $2,050 |
| 1906 | Red River | Walter Miller | Thomas J. Healey | Richard T. Wilson Jr. | 5 F (T) | 1:00.40 | $1,900 |
| 1905 | Voorhees | Frank O'Neill | Charles W. Carroll | Patrick H. McCarren (Lessee) | 5 F (T) | 1:00.00 | $2,045 |
| 1904 | St. Bellane | Herman H. Phillips | William Shields | Edward R. Thomas | 5 F (T) | 1:01.60 | $2,895 |
| 1903 | Nameoki | John J. Hoar | Frank D. Weir | Frank J. Farrell | 5 F (T) | 1:02.00 | $2,185 |
| 1902 | Roxboro | Patrick A. McCue | Jere Dunn | D. McClinch | 5 F (T) | 1:01.20 | $1,220 |
| 1901 | Leonora Loring | Winfield O'Connor | William O. Scully | L. M. Myers | 5 F (T) | 1:00.60 | $685 |
| 1900 | Lady of the Valley | Patrick A. McCue | Thomas J. Healey | Richard T. Wilson Jr. | 5 F (T) | 1:02.00 | $810 |
| 1899 | Neda | John Bullman | Edward Feakes | David Gideon & John Daly | 5 F (T) | 1:02.20 | |
| 1898 | Kingdon | Tod Sloan | Hardy Campbell Jr. | Michael F. Dwyer | 5 F (T) | 1:01.80 | |
| 1897 | Makallah | Fred Taral | Matthew Byrnes | Marcus Daly | 5 F (T) | 1:02.20 | |
| 1896 | George Kessler | Fred Taral | Matthew Byrnes | Matthew Byrnes | 5 F (T) | 1:05.00 | |
| 1895 | Floretta | Henry F. Griffin | A. Jack Joyner | Blemton Stable (August Belmont Jr.) | 5 F (T) | 1:00.40 | |
| 1894 | Harry Reed | Willie Simms | Hardy Campbell Jr. | Michael F. Dwyer | 5 F (T) | 1:02.00 | |
| 1893 | Cataract | Willie Simms | John Huggins | Rancocas Stable | 5 F (T) | 1:01.40 | |
| 1892 | Lovelace | Marty Bergen | John Hunter | John Hunter | 5 F (T) | 1:03.20 | |
| 1891 | Charade | Albert Thompson | William R. Jones | William R. Jones | 5 F (T) | 1:03.00 | |
| 1890 | Eclipse | Frank Reagan | James Sennett | James Sennett & Warn | 5 F (T) | 1:02.40 | |
