= Sly Fox (horse) =

American-bred Thoroughbred racehorse

- Sire: Silver Fox
- Grandsire: St. Blaise
- Dam: Asteria
- Damsire: Kantaka
- Sex: Stallion
- Foaled: 1895
- Country: United States
- Color: Chestnut
- Breeder: Bowling Brook Stud
- Owner: Charles F. Dwyer
- Trainer: Hardy Campbell, Jr.
- Record: Not found
- Earnings: Not found

Major wins
- Lightning Stakes (1897); Arverne Handicap (1898); Broadway Stakes (1898); Brooklyn Handicap (1898); Crotona Handicap (1898); Poncantico Handicap (1898); Van Cortlandt Handicap (1898); Van Nest Stakes (1898) American Classics wins: Preakness Stakes (1898)

Sly Fox (1895 – after 1909) was an American Thoroughbred racehorse best known for winning the 1898 Preakness Stakes. He was bred by U.S. Racing Hall of Fame inductee Wyndham Walden at his Bowling Brook Stud in Middleburg, Maryland. A son of Silver Fox, whose English sire was the 1883 Epsom Derby winner, St. Blaise, he was out of the mare Asteria.

Sly Fox was owned and raced by Charles Dwyer, the eldest son of prominent New York City horseman, Mike Dwyer. Trained by Hardy Campbell Jr., the colt won several races and is remembered for winning the Preakness Stakes in the pre-U.S. Triple Crown era. Sly Fox won the 1898 Preakness in a year when the race was hosted by the Gravesend Race Track in Gravesend, Brooklyn, New York. The heavily backed horse won by three lengths, defeating the favorite, The Huguenot. His jockey, Willie Simms, remains the only African-American to ever win the Preakness Stakes.

Sly Fox was sold in December 1899 to Solly Joel and was exported to the United Kingdom. Sly Fox stood for the 1907 breeding season in Devonshire under the ownership of a Mr. Ash of Barnstaple.
