= Lawrence Realization Stakes =

- Class: Discontinued stakes
- Location: Belmont Park; Elmont, New York, United States
- Inaugurated: 1889
- Race type: Thoroughbred – Flat racing

Race information
- Distance: 9 furlongs (1 1/8 mi; 1.8 km)
- Surface: Dirt
- Track: left-handed
- Qualification: Three-year-olds

The Lawrence Realization Stakes was an American horse race first run on the turf in 1889. The race, for three-year-old Thoroughbred colts, geldings and fillies, was last run in 2005.

== History ==
Inaugurated at the Sheepshead Bay Race Track at Gravesend, New York, it was held there until 1913. At that time, the race was the richest stakes for three-year-olds in the United States.

It was run as the Realization Stakes until 1899, when it was renamed to honor James G. K. Lawrence, president of the Coney Island Jockey Club (which owned the racetrack). Lawrence was also responsible for creating of the Futurity Stakes in 1888.

The stakes were later run at Belmont Park on Long Island as a Grade II race on the dirt. The race continued to be run there (except for the Belmont Park redevelopment period from 1962 to 1968) until it was removed from the calendar in 2005 by the New York Racing Association (NYRA) as a cost-cutting measure. For 70 years, the Lawrence Realization was one of the most prestigious annual events in the American horse racing calendar.

Only two horses contested the race in 1918, 1920, 1944, and 1946; however, due to the large number of entries in 1976 and 1985 it was run in two divisions.

The race was contested over several distances:

- 1 5/8 miles (2.6 km) : 1889–1913, 1918–1969
- 1 1/2 miles (2.4 km) : 1916–1917, 1970–2004
- 1 1/8 miles (1.8 km) : 2005

== Records ==
On September 4, 1920, Man o' War won the 1 5/8-mile (2.6 km) Lawrence Realization by 100 lengths over the only other runner, Hoodwink. His time for the race was 2 min 40 4/5 s, which broke the world record for the distance by 1 3/5 seconds and was his fifth record-setting performance that year. The great Kelso tied the record in 1960.

=== Records for distance ===
- At 1 1/2 miles (2.4 km) : 2:25.94 – Parade Ground (1998)
- At 1 5/8 miles (2.6 km) : 2:40.80 – Man o' War (1920)
- At 1 5/8 miles (2.6 km) : 2:40.80 – Kelso (1960)

=== Most wins by a jockey ===
- 5 – Braulio Baeza (1961, 1966, 1967, 1968, 1972)
- 5 – Eddie Arcaro (1935, 1939, 1952, 1959, 1960)

=== Most wins by a trainer ===
- 8 – "Sunny Jim" Fitzsimmons (1924, 1925, 1930, 1932, 1934, 1936, 1938, 1940)

=== Most wins by an owner ===
- 6 – Belair Stud (1924, 1925, 1930, 1932, 1936, 1940)

== Winners ==
Year	Winner	Jockey	Trainer	Owner	Time
2005	Taming The Tiger	Ramon Domínguez	Robert P. Klesaris	C D and G Stable et al.	1:49.72
2004	Gunning For	Joe Bravo	Timothy Walsh	Mrs. Thomas J. Walsh	2:29.91
2003	Kicken Kris	Javier Castellano	Michael Matz	Brushwood Stable	2:27.98
2002	Fisher Pond	John Velazquez	Todd A. Pletcher	Eugene & Laura Melnyk	2:30.34
2001	Sharp Performance	John Velazquez	David Donk	William Bloom	2:27.04
2000	Ciro	José A. Santos	Christophe Clement	Jayeff B Stables	2:31.48
1999	Gritty Sandie	Mike E. Smith	James J. Toner	Caesar P. Kimmel & Ron Nicholson	2:28.60
1998	Parade Ground	Pat Day	Neil J. Howard	W. S. Farish & S. C. Hilbert	2:25.94
1997	Renewed	Filiberto Leon	Carlos F. Martin	Murray Garren	2:27.21
1996	Da Dean	Richard Migliore	James Lawrence II	Mrs. Stephen Clark	2:39.06
1995	Flitch	Mike E. Smith	William Badgett Jr.	Loblolly Stable	2:34.40
1994	Personal Merit	Jorge F. Chavez	William W. Perry	Daffodil Hill Farm	2:29.30
1993	Strolling Along	Chris McCarron	Shug McGaughey	Ogden Phipps	2:32.70
1992	Timber Cat	Robbie Davis	Robert P. Lake	Ping W. Tam	2:28.87
1991	Jaded Dancer	Jean-Luc Samyn	Patrick J. Kelly	Live Oak Racing	2:32.00
1990	Baylis	Lanfranco Dettori	Luca Cumani	Sheikh Mohammed	2:29.00
1989	Caltech	René Douglas	Eduardo Azpurua Jr.	David S. Romanik	2:26.00
1988	Blew By Em	Chris Antley	Michael Daggett	Joseph B. Singer	2:27.20
1987	Tertiary Zone	Sandy Hawley	Peter Cole	Dan J. Agnew	2:30.00
1986	The Lone Ranger	Chris McCarron	Michael Sedlacek	Rory Green Stable	2:37.40
1985	Danger's Hour	Don MacBeth	MacKenzie Miller	Rokeby Stables	2:30.40
1985	Noisy When Hot	José A. Santos	Floreano Fernandez	Brazil Stables	2:28.00
1984	Roving Ministrel	Kenny Skinner	Lawrence Kelly	Craig F. Cullinan Jr.	2:28.40
1983	Moon Spirit	Ángel Cordero Jr.	Angel Penna Jr.	Blanche Wise	2:26.40
1982	Ten Below	Jimmy Miranda	Pancho Martin	Viola Summer	2:27.40
1981	Our Captain Willie	Ángel Cordero Jr.	Lou Rondinello	Daniel M. Galbreath	2:27.40
1980	Rumbo	Bill Shoemaker	Thomas Bell Jr.	Gayno-Bell Stable	2:26.00
1979	Golden Act	Sandy Hawley	Loren Rettele	W. H. Oldknow & R. W. Phipps	2:27.20
1978	Mac Diarmida	Jean Cruguet	Flint S. Schulhofer	Jerome M. Torsney	2:29.20
1977	Zihov	Antonio Graell	Joseph R. Nash	Mrs. Joseph Nash	2:27.60
1976	Great Contractor	Pat Day	Roger Laurin	Howard P. Wilson	2:31.60
1976	L'Heureux	Donald Pierce	Neil D. Drysdale	Saron Stable (Corbin J. Robertson Jr.)	2:35.00
1975	Grab Bag	Jean Cruguet	Thomas J. Kelly	John M. Schiff	2:26.80
1974	Prod	Jorge Velásquez	MacKenzie Miller	Cragwood Stables	2:28.20
1973	Amen	Eddie Belmonte	Philip G. Johnson	Dee-Bob Stable (D. Margolies, R. Kropp, J. Sheldon, D. Geller)	2:36.80
1972	Halo	Braulio Baeza	MacKenzie Miller	Cragwood Stables	2:27.60
1971	Specious	Eddie Maple	Victor J. Nickerson	Elmendorf Farm	2:42.20
1970	Kling Kling	Jean Cruguet	Thomas J. Kelly	John M. Schiff	2:41.20
1969	Oil Power	Jean Cruguet	James P. Conway	Elmendorf Farm	2:44.60
1968	Funny Fellow	Braulio Baeza	Edward A. Neloy	Wheatley Stable	2:44.20
1967	Successor	Braulio Baeza	Edward A. Neloy	Wheatley Stable	2:43.40
1966	Buckpasser	Braulio Baeza	Edward A. Neloy	Ogden Phipps	2:45.00
1965	Munden Point	Sam Boulmetis Sr.	Ira Hanford	Loren P. Guy	2:42.00
1964	Quadrangle	Manuel Ycaza	J. Elliott Burch	Rokeby Stable	2:42.60
1963	Dean Carl	Bobby Ussery	Paul Bongarzone	Paul Bongarzone	2:43.80
1962	Battle Joined	Manuel Ycaza	Woody Stephens	Cain Hoy Stable	2:42.60
1961	Sherluck	Braulio Baeza	Harold Young	Jacob Sher	2:44.40
1960	Kelso	Eddie Arcaro	Carl Hanford	Bohemia Stable	2:40.80
1959	Middle Brother	Eddie Arcaro	E. Barry Ryan	Mrs. E. Barry Ryan	2:43.20
1958	Martins Rullah	Bill Shoemaker	Eugene Jacobs	George Lewis	2:43.40
1957	Promised Land	Hedley Woodhouse	Hirsch Jacobs	Ethel D. Jacobs	2:44.40
1956	Riley	Ted Atkinson	John M. Gaver Sr.	Greentree Stable	2:44.60
1955	Thinking Cap	Paul J. Bailey	Henry S. Clark	Christiana Stable	2:43.40
1954	Fisherman	Hedley Woodhouse	Sylvester Veitch	C. V. Whitney	2:42.00
1953	Platan	Conn McCreary	Harry Trotsek	Hasty House Farm	2:43.40
1952	Mark-Ye-Well	Eddie Arcaro	Horace A. Jones	Calumet Farm	2:42.60
1951	Counterpoint	Dave Gorman	Sylvester Veitch	C. V. Whitney	2:42.60
1950	Bed O' Roses	Nick Combest	William C. Winfrey	Alfred G. Vanderbilt II	2:44.20
1949	Ponder	Steve Brooks	Ben A. Jones	Calumet Farm	2:42.60
1948	Ace Admiral	Ted Atkinson	James W. Smith	Maine Chance Farm	2:42.80
1947	Cosmic Bomb	Ovie Scurlock	William J. Booth	William G. Helis Sr.	2:43.60
1946	School Tie	Ted Atkinson	John M. Gaver Sr.	Greentree Stable	2:43.60
1945	Pot O'Luck	Douglas Dodson	Benjamin A. Jones	Calumet Farm	2:43.60
1944	By Jimminy	George Woolf	James W. Smith	Alfred P. Parker	2:43.20
1943	Fairy Manhurst	Johnny Longden	Richard E. Handlen	Foxcatcher Farm	2:43.00
1942	Alsab	George Woolf	Sarge Swenke	Mrs. Albert Sabath	2:42.00
1941	Whirlaway	Alfred Robertson	Ben A. Jones	Calumet Farm	2:44.20
1940	Fenelon	James Stout	James E. Fitzsimmons	Belair Stud	2:44.80
1939	Hash	Eddie Arcaro	John M. Gaver Sr.	Greentree Stable	2:42.60
1938	Magic Hour	Johnny Longden	James E. Fitzsimmons	Ogden Phipps	2:45.00
1937	Unfailing	Frank Kopel	Max Hirsch	Parker Corning	2:44.20
1936	Granville	James Stout	James E. Fitzsimmons	Belair Stud	2:43.60
1935	Firethorn	Eddie Arcaro	Preston M. Burch	Walter M. Jeffords Sr.	2:42.20
1934	Carry Over	Tommy Malley	James E. Fitzsimmons	Wheatley Stable	2:44.00
1933	War Glory	John Gilbert	George Conway	Glen Riddle Farm	2:44.60
1932	Faireno	Tommy Malley	James E. Fitzsimmons	Belair Stud	2:43.60
1931	Twenty Grand	Charley Kurtsinger	James G. Rowe Jr.	Greentree Stable	2:41.20
1930	Gallant Fox	Earl Sande	James E. Fitzsimmons	Belair Stud	2:41.40
1929	The Nut	Mack Garner	Joe Notter	Warm Stable	2:45.60
1928	Reigh Count	Chick Lang	Bert S. Michell	Fannie Hertz	2:44.60
1927	Nimba	Harold Thurber	George M. Odom	Marshall Field III	2:45.00
1926	Espino	Laverne Fator	William J. Speirs	William Ziegler Jr.	2:42.60
1925	Marconi	Kenneth Noe	James E. Fitzsimmons	L. T. Cooper	2:43.80
1924	Aga Khan	John Maiben	James E. Fitzsimmons	Belair Stud	2:48.40
1923	Zev	Earl Sande	Sam Hildreth	Rancocas Stable	2:44.60
1922	Kai Song	Earl Sande	Sam Hildreth	Rancocas Stable	2:42.40
1921	Touch Me Not	Frank Coltiletti	James G. Rowe Sr.	Greentree Stable	2:43.20
1920	Man o' War	Clarence Kummer	Louis Feustel	Glen Riddle Farm	2:40.80
1919	Vexatious †	Willie Knapp	James G. Rowe Sr.	Harry Payne Whitney	2:47.60
1918	Johren	Frank Robinson	James G. Rowe Sr.	Harry Payne Whitney	2:55.20
1917	Omar Khayyam	Merritt C. Buxton	Richard F. Carmen	Wilfrid Viau	2:33.40
1916	Star Hawk	Herman Phillips	Walter B. Jennings	A. Kingsley Macomber	2:32.60
1911	1912	Race not held			
1913	Rock View	Tommy McTaggart	Louis Feustel	August Belmont Jr.	2:51.00
1912	No races held due to the Hart–Agnew Law.				
1911	No races held due to the Hart–Agnew Law.				
1910	Sweep	Joe Notter	James G. Rowe Sr.	James R. Keene	2:53.00
1909	Fitz Herbert	Vincent Powers	Sam Hildreth	Sam Hildreth	2:45.00
1908	Fair Play	Eddie Dugan	A. Jack Joyner	August Belmont Jr.	2:46.20
1907	Dinna Ken	George Mountain	John W. Rogers	Harry Payne Whitney	2:48.00
1906	Accountant	Jack Martin	Matthew M. Allen	James B. Brady	2:48.00
1905	Sysonby	Dave Nicol	James G. Rowe Sr.	James R. Keene	2:47.00
1904	Ort Wells	Frank O'Neill	Enoch Wishard	John A. Drake	2:47.60
1903	Africander	John Bullman	Richard O. Miller	Hampton Stable	2:45.20
1902	Major Daingerfield	George Odom	Matthew M. Allen	Frederick C. McLewee & Co.	2:59.80
1901	The Parader	Patrick A. McCue	Thomas J. Healey	Richard T. Wilson Jr.	2:49.80
1900	Prince of Melbourne	Henry Spencer	J. Kyle	Frank D. Beard	2:59.80
1899	Ethelbert	Henry Spencer	A. Jack Joyner	Perry Belmont	2:51.40
1898	Hamburg	Tod Sloan	Matthew Byrnes	Marcus Daly	2:51.20
1897	The Friar	Fred Littlefield	R. Wyndham Walden	Alfred & Dave Morris	2:48.40
1896	Requital	Alonzo Clayton	James G. Rowe Sr.	Brookdale Farm Stable	2:49.40
1895	Bright Phoebus	Lester Reiff	H. H. Huron	Del Monte Stable	2:51.40
1894	Dobbins	Willie Simms	Hardy Campbell Jr.	Richard Croker	2:55.00
1893	Daily America	Willie Simms	John W. Rogers	Brown & Rogers	2:50.60
1892	Tammany	Edward Garrison	Matthew Byrnes	Marcus Daly	2:51.40
1891	Potomac	Anthony Hamilton	Hardy Campbell Jr.	Michael F. Dwyer	2:51.00
1890	Tournament	William Hayward	Matthew M. Allen	George Hearst	2:51.00
1889	Salvator	Jim McLaughlin	Matthew Byrnes	James B. A. Haggin	2:51.00

* † In 1919, Over There finished first but was disqualified.

== See also ==
- Aqueduct Racetrack
- Belmont Park
- Man o' War
