= Willie Simms =

American jockey

- Willie Simms (c.1900)

Personal information
- Born: January 16, 1870 Augusta, Georgia, USA
- Died: February 26, 1927 (aged 57) Asbury Park, New Jersey, USA
- Occupation: Jockey

Horse racing career
- Sport: Horse racing
- Career wins: 1,125

Major racing wins
- Expectation Stakes (1889, 1894, 1897); Belles Stakes (1891, 1892); Spinaway Stakes (1891); Champion Stakes (1892); First Special Stakes (1892, 1894, 1897); Second Special Stakes (1892, 1894, 1895, 1897); Flatbush Stakes (1892); Sapphire Stakes (1892); Tidal Stakes (1892, 1894, 1897); Daisy Stakes (1893, 1894); Lawrence Realization Stakes (1893, 1894); Pansy Stakes (1893); Surf Stakes (1893); Zephyr Stakes (1893); Fashion Stakes (1894); Juvenile Stakes (1894, 1898); Mermaid Stakes (1894); Reapers Stakes (1894); September Stakes (1894, 1895); Jerome Handicap (1895); Omnium Handicap (1895, 1897); Carlton Stakes (1896, 1897); Withers Stakes (1896, 1897); Brighton Handicap (1897, 1898); Tremont Stakes (1897); Broadway Stakes (1898); Golden Rod Stakes (1898); Toboggan Handicap (1898); Annual Champion Stakes (1901) American Classic Race wins: Kentucky Derby (1896, 1898); Preakness Stakes (1898); Belmont Stakes (1893, 1894)

Racing awards
- United States Champion Jockey by wins (1893, 1894)

Honours
- United States Racing Hall of Fame (1977)

Significant horses
- Banquet, Ben Brush, Clifford, Handspring, Sly Fox, Lady Violet, Henry of Navarre, Commanche, Plaudit, Lamplighter
- Updated on June 26, 2018

Willie Simms (January 16, 1870 – February 26, 1927) was an American National Champion jockey in Thoroughbred racing and a U.S. Racing Hall of Fame inductee who won five of the races that would become the U.S. Triple Crown series.

An African American, Simms began racing in 1887 and was one of the most successful jockeys using the short-stirrup style (which gave the rider a crouching posture). En route to winning the United States riding title in 1893 and 1894, Simms won back-to-back Belmont Stakes. On August 17, 1894, Willie Simms won the first five races at Jerome Park Racetrack and finished second in the sixth and last race of the day. All five of Simms' winners were trained by Hardy Campbell Jr.

In 1895, the Boston Post reported Willie Simms was among the elite jockeys and was earning more than $10,500 a year. (US$315,548 in 2018) That year he raced in England, where he became the first American jockey to win with an American horse in that country.

Back in the United States, Simms won the 1896 Kentucky Derby in its first running at 1¼ miles on Ben Brush. He repeated as the Derby winner in 1898, aboard Plaudit. Before the advent of the term "Triple Crown" and the importance of the U.S. Triple Crown series, Simms went on to take the Preakness Stakes a few weeks later on a different horse, Sly Fox. He is the only African American jockey to win all three Triple Crown races.

During his 14-year career, Willie Simms rode some of the great Thoroughbred racehorses of the day such as two-time American Horse of the Year, Henry of Navarre.

Willie Simms finished his riding career with 1,125 wins and in 1977 was inducted into the National Museum of Racing and Hall of Fame

His name was frequently misspelled as "Sims" by media of his era.
