= Second Special Stakes =

- Class: Discontinued stakes
- Location: Gravesend Race Track; Gravesend, Coney Island, NY
- Inaugurated: 1886–1907
- Race type: Thoroughbred – Flat racing

Race information
- Distance: 1½ miles (12 furlongs)
- Surface: Dirt
- Track: left-handed
- Qualification: Three-years-old and up

The Second Special Stakes was a Thoroughbred horse race run between 1886 and 1907 at Gravesend Race Track in Gravesend, on Coney Island, New York. The race was run on dirt at a distance of one and one half miles in its last nine runnings and was open to horses of either sex age three and older since inception.

== Historical notes ==
The Second Special Stakes had only two starters in 1892 through 1895, 1897, and again in 1906. Some of this lack of competition may well be as a result of the purse distribution during that era when a third-place finisher collected only a very tiny portion. This situation often limited the number of entrants if there were one or two dominant entries as owners would switch their horse to run on another day when there was a race where they might have a reasonable chance of winning. In these six Second Special Stakes races with just two horses competing, all were won by a national Champion.

== Demise of the Second Special Stakes ==
After years of uncertainty, on June 11, 1908 the Republican controlled New York Legislature under Governor Charles Evans Hughes passed the Hart–Agnew anti-betting legislation with penalties allowing for fines and up to a year in prison. The owners of Sheepshead Bay Race Track, and other racing facilities in New York State, struggled to stay in business without income from betting. Racetrack operators had no choice but cancel some races and drastically reduce the purse money being paid out which resulted in the Second Special Stakes being placed on hiatus. These small purses made racing horses highly unprofitable and impossible for even the most successful owners to continue in business. Further restrictive legislation was passed by the New York Legislature in 1910 which deepened the financial crisis for track operators and after a 1911 amendment to the law that would have limited the liability of owners and directors was defeated, every racetrack in New York State shut down. Owners, whose horses of racing age had nowhere to go, began sending them, their trainers and their jockeys to race in England and France. Many horses ended their racing careers there, and a number remained to become an important part of the European horse breeding industry. Thoroughbred Times reported that more than 1,500 American horses were sent overseas between 1908 and 1913 and of them at least 24 were either past, present, or future Champions. When a February 21, 1913 ruling by the New York Supreme Court, Appellate Division Court saw horse racing return in 1913 it was too late for the Sheepshead Bay horse racing facility and it never reopened.

== Records ==
Speed record:

- 1 1/8 miles : 1:54.75 – Clifford (1894)
- 1 1/2 miles : 2:31.80 – Ballot (1907)

Most wins:

- 2 – Clifford (1894, 1895)
- 2 – Imp (1899, 1900)
- 2 – Blues (1901, 1902)

Most wins by a jockey:

- 4 – Willie Simms (1892, 1894, 1895, 1897)

Most wins by a trainer:

- 3 – Thomas Welsh (1901, 1902, 1906)

Most wins by an owner:

- 3 – Dwyer Brothers Stable / Michael F. Dwyer (1887, 1888, 1897)

== Winners ==
Year	Winner	Age	Jockey	Trainer	Owner	Dist. (Miles)	Time	Win$
1907	Ballot	3	Dave Nicol	James G. Rowe Sr.	James R. Keene	1 1/2 M	2:31.80	$5,025
1906	Running Water	3	Walter Miller	Thomas Welsh	Newcastle Stable (A. Miller/F. R. Bishop/B. Painter)	1 1/2 M	2:45.40	$4,600
1905	Oiseau	3	Frank O'Neill	Matthew M. Allen	James B. Brady	1 1/2 M	2:33.20	$4,625
1904	Beldame	3	Frank O'Neill	Fred Burlew	Newton Bennington (Lessee)	1 1/2 M	2:35.40	$4,775
1903	McChesney	4	Grover Fuller	Frank M. Taylor	Edward E. Smathers	1 1/2 M	2:34.00	$2,375
1902	Blues	4	Jack Martin	Thomas Welsh	Frank J. Farrell	1 1/2 M	2:35.40	$2,625
1901	Blues	3	Willie Shaw	Thomas Welsh	Frank J. Farrell	1 1/2 M	2:33.00	$2,725
1900	Imp	6	Tommy Burns	Charles E. Brossman	Daniel R. Harness	1 1/2 M	2:34.20	$2,500
1899	Imp	5	Peter Clay	Charles E. Brossman	Daniel R. Harness	1 1/2 M	2:34.00	$2,675
1898	Race not held							
1897	Ben Brush	4	Willie Simms	Hardy Campbell Jr.	Michael F. Dwyer	1 1/4 M	2:10.00	$1,850
1896	Race not held							
1895	Clifford	5	Willie Simms	H. Eugene Leigh	H. Eugene Leigh	1 1/8 M	1:56.50	$1,350
1894	Clifford	4	Willie Simms	H. Eugene Leigh	H. Eugene Leigh	1 1/8 M	1:54.75	$1,475
1893	Tammany	4	Edward Garrison	Matthew Byrnes	Marcus Daly	1 1/8 M	1:57.25	$2,900
1892	Lamplighter	3	Willie Simms	John W. Rogers	Samuel S. Brown	1 1/8 M	1:57.50	$3,100
1891	Judge Morrow	4	Alexander Covington	Green B. Morris	Green B. Morris	1 1/8 M	1:55.75	$3,100
1890	Los Angeles	5	Shelby Barnes	Albert Cooper	Lucky Baldwin	1 1/8 M	1:59.75	$3,000
1889	Reporter	3	Marty Bergen	John W. Rogers	Samuel S. Brown	1 1/8 M	1:56.75	$3,050
1888	Kingston	4	Isaac Burns Murphy	Frank McCabe	Dwyer Brothers Stable	1 1/8 M	1:56.75	$3,000
1887	Hanover	3	Jim McLaughlin	Frank McCabe	Dwyer Brothers Stable	1 1/8 M	1:57.50	$2,680
1886	Elkwood	3	William J. Fitzpatrick	James B. Dyer	Walter Gratz	1 1/4 M	2:13.25	$1,925
