= Jacobus (horse) =

American-bred Thoroughbred racehorse

- Sire: The Ill-Used
- Grandsire: Breadalbane
- Dam: Nellie James
- Damsire: Dollar
- Sex: Stallion
- Foaled: 1880
- Country: United States
- Colour: Bay
- Breeder: August Belmont
- Owner: James E. Kelley
- Trainer: Richard Dwyer
- Record: 45-11
- Earnings: $6,732

Major wins
- Surf Stakes (1882); American Classics wins: Preakness Stakes (1883)

Jacobus (foaled 1880 in New York state) was an American Thoroughbred racehorse who won the 1883 Preakness Stakes.

== Background ==
Bred by August Belmont at his Nursery Stud in Babylon, New York, Jacobus was sold to James E. Kelley along with other unraced colts for $10,000.

== Racing career ==
Raced at age two, Jacobus won the Surf Stakes at Sheepshead Bay Race Track. He ran third in the Juvenile Stakes at Jerome Park and third again in both the Hopeful Stakes and August Stakes at Monmouth Park.

As a three-year-old, Jacobus' ran third behind winner Barnes in the mile and one-half Coney Island Derby at Sheepshead Bay. The biggest win of his career came in what would become the second leg of the U.S. Triple Crown series, the 1883 Preakness Stakes. In a two-horse matchup run over a mile and one-half at Pimlico Race Course, jockey George Barbee earned his third Preakness win by guiding Jacobus to a four length win over his only competitor, Parnell.

== Pedigree ==
Pedigree of Jacobus
Sire The Ill-Used 1870	Breadalbane 1862	Stockwell	The Baron
Sire The Ill-Used 1870	Breadalbane 1862	Stockwell	Pocahontas
Sire The Ill-Used 1870	Breadalbane 1862	Blink Bonny	Melbourne
Sire The Ill-Used 1870	Breadalbane 1862	Blink Bonny	Queen Mary
Sire The Ill-Used 1870	Ellermire 1852	Chanticleer	Birdcatcher
Sire The Ill-Used 1870	Ellermire 1852	Chanticleer	Whim
Sire The Ill-Used 1870	Ellermire 1852	Ellerdale	Lanercost
Sire The Ill-Used 1870	Ellermire 1852	Ellerdale	Tomboy Mare
Dam Nellie James 1867	Dollar 1860	The Flying Dutchman	Bay Middleton
Dam Nellie James 1867	Dollar 1860	The Flying Dutchman	Barbelle
Dam Nellie James 1867	Dollar 1860	Payment	Slane
Dam Nellie James 1867	Dollar 1860	Payment	Receipt
Dam Nellie James 1867	Fleur Des Champs 1862	Newminster	Touchstone
Dam Nellie James 1867	Fleur Des Champs 1862	Newminster	Beeswing
Dam Nellie James 1867	Fleur Des Champs 1862	Maria	Harkaway
Dam Nellie James 1867	Fleur Des Champs 1862	Maria	Suspicion
