= Hardy Campbell Jr. =

American racing horse trainer and owner

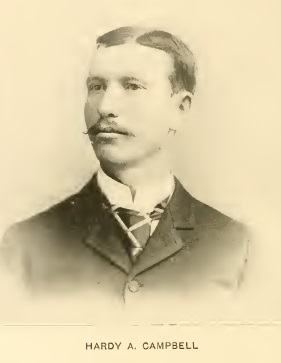

Personal information
- Born: c. 1863 United States
- Died: June 24, 1898 Sheepshead Bay, Brooklyn, New York
- Occupation: Trainer/Owner

Horse racing career
- Sport: Horse racing
- Career wins: Not found

Major racing wins
- First Special Stakes (1890, 1894, 1897); Flight Stakes (1890, 1892); Dash Stakes (1891); Freehold Stakes (1891); Lawrence Realization Stakes (1891, 1894); Monmouth Handicap (1891); Sapling Stakes (1891); Spindrift Stakes (1891); Monmouth Cup (1892); Monmouth Delaware Handicap (1892); Manhattan Handicap (1892); Surf Stakes (1892); Vernal Stakes (1892); Foam Stakes (1893); June Stakes (1893); Tremont Stakes (1893); Zephyr Stakes (1893); American Jockey Club Handicap (1894); Brooklyn Derby (1894); Daisy Stakes (1894, 1898); Tidal Stakes (1894); Champagne Stakes (1895); Brighton Handicap (1897); Flatbush Stakes (1897); Great American Stakes (1897); Second Special Stakes (1897); Suburban Handicap (1897); Latonia Derby (1897); Broadway Stakes (1898); Double Event Stakes (part 1) (1898) American Classic Race wins: Kentucky Derby (1896); Preakness Stakes (1898); In England: Crawford Plate (1915)

Significant horses
- Banquet, Ben Brush, Cleophus, Dobbins, Don Alonzo, Kingston, Longstreet, Raceland, Sly Fox

Hardy Alonzo Campbell Jr. (c.1863 – June 24, 1898) was an American Thoroughbred horse racing trainer and Standardbred horse owner.

== Early career ==
Hardy Campbell Sr. was involved in horse racing, and Hardy Jr. spent his life around and in the business. He became head stable lad for Dwyer Brothers Stable in Brooklyn, New York, one of the top racing operations in the United States. While working for the Dwyer stable, Hardy Campbell Jr. learned racehorse conditioning from future Hall of Fame trainers James G. Rowe Sr. and Frank McCabe. The Dwyer brothers racing partnership was dissolved in 1890 and Mike Dwyer offered Campbell the job of head trainer for his stable and for the next seven years the two met with considerable success.

During his career, Campbell trained some of the best horses of the 1890s including 1891 American Horse of the Year and 1891 and 1892 American Champion Older Male Horse, Longstreet, the 1896 and 1897 National Champion filly Cleophus, as well as Hall of Fame inductees, Kingston and Ben Brush.

On August 17, 1894, Hardy Campbell won the first five races at Jerome Park Racetrack. All five of his winners were ridden by Hall of Fame jockey Willie Simms.

== Move to England ==
In January 1895 a number of prominent Americans sent a stable of horses to compete in England. Mike Dwyer and Richard Croker, with whom Dwyer operated a racing partnership, also sent a stable of horses under the care of Campbell and jockey Willie Simms. The American trainer caused a sir among his English counterparts when he timed his horses' workouts, something that all race conditioners were then doing in North America and Australia. In April 1895, Campbell and Simms won the Crawford Plate at Newmarket Racecourse with a horse name Utica who was renamed in England as Eau de Gallie. Although Hardy Campbell Jr. remained head trainer for Mike Dwyer throughout his short life, he only trained for Richard Croker until the Dwyer-Croker partnership was dissolved on May 17, 1895, in England.

== Return to United States ==
Back in the United States, in 1896 Campbell won the Kentucky Derby with Ben Brush and got his second American Classic win in the 1898 Preakness Stakes with Sly Fox, the latter a colt owned by Mike Dwyer's eldest son, Charles. Campbell Jr. trained Mike Dwyer's filly Cleophus to American Champion Three-Year-Old Filly honors in 1896 and 1897.

== Death ==
In early June 1898, the then thirty-four-year Campbell fell ill with pneumonia. A husband and father of two, he died two weeks later on June 24. In their obituary, the New York Times called him "an excellent judge of horses" and that it was "due in a great measure to his ability as a trainer that M. F. Dwyer was so successful with his horses.

A few months later his despondent sixty-year-old father, further distressed by a disagreement with a grandson over a horse owned by his son, attempted suicide.
