= Old England (horse) =

American Thoroughbred racehorse

- Sire: Goldfinch
- Grandsire: Ormond
- Dam: Queen Bess
- Damsire: Marden
- Sex: Colt, eventually Gelding
- Foaled: 1899
- Country: United States
- Color: bay
- Breeder: James B. A. Haggin
- Owner: Green B. Morris
- Trainer: Green B. Morris
- Record: Not found
- Earnings: Not found

Major wins
- Seagate Stakes (1902); Broadway Stakes (1902); Iroquois Stakes (1902); Toboggan Handicap (1902); Crotona Handicap (1902); American Classic Race wins: Preakness Stakes (1902)

Old England (1899–1908) was an American Thoroughbred racehorse best known for winning the 1902 Preakness Stakes. Owned and trained by Green B. Morris, he was sired by Goldfinch. Old England was out of the mare Queen Bess, a daughter of Marden.

== Preakness Stakes ==
The twenty-seventh running of the Preakness Stakes took place on Tuesday, May 27, 1902, at Gravesend Race Track on Coney Island, New York. On that day Old England went off as the second favorite at odds of 9–5 in the field of seven. In that race he broke well with a good start in third place under jockey Lee Jackson. Rounding the first turn, Old England moved forward into first place by one length. The pace of the race was somewhat fast that day with the first quarter in :24-3/5 and the half in :48-3/5. As the race progressed, Old England stayed in front by a single length down the entire backstretch and around the final turn.

Near the top of the lane two challengers made a charge at Old England but in the last sixteenth of a mile Namtor faded and dropped off while Major Daingerfield pulled up to Old England's side and fought with him all the way to the wire. In the end, Old England prevailed by a scant nose. Major Daingerfield finished second having outdistanced third-place finisher Namtor by six lengths.

The final time for the one mile and 70 yard race on dirt was 1:45-4/5 over a fast track. Old England won almost 70% of the total purse of $3,000 netting earnings $2,240.

== Racing career ==
Old England started racing late in his two-year-old season. In 1901 he won his maiden and won and placed in allowance races at tracks around New York. Throughout his three-year-old season Old England compiled one of the best racing records in the first quarter of the century. In the early part of 1902 he won the Iroquois and Seagate Stakes while placing second in the Withers Stakes at Aqueduct Race Track.

After his Preakness Stakes win he continued to have success by winning stakes races. Old England went on to win the Broadway Stakes at a mile and one sixteenth at Gravesend Race Track on Coney Island, New York. He won a six furlong sprint in the Toboggan Handicap at Aqueduct in Queens, New York. He also won the Crotona Handicap and ran third in the Equality Stakes.

At age four Old England had a strong runner-up finish to William C. Whitney's Gunfire in the Metropolitan Handicap at one mile at Belmont Park on Memorial Day weekend. His death was reported to The Jockey Club in April 1908.

== Breeding ==
Pedigree of Old England
Sire Goldfinch bay 1889	Ormond bay 1883	Bend Or	Doncaster
Sire Goldfinch bay 1889	Ormond bay 1883	Bend Or	Rogue Rose
Sire Goldfinch bay 1889	Ormond bay 1883	Lily Agnes	Macaroni
Sire Goldfinch bay 1889	Ormond bay 1883	Lily Agnes	Polly Agnes
Sire Goldfinch bay 1889	Thistle bay 1875	Scottish Chief	Lord of the Isles
Sire Goldfinch bay 1889	Thistle bay 1875	Scottish Chief	Miss Ann
Sire Goldfinch bay 1889	Thistle bay 1875	The Flower Safety	Wild Dayrell
Sire Goldfinch bay 1889	Thistle bay 1875	The Flower Safety	Nettle
Dam Queen Bess black 1886	Marden bay 1879	Hermit	Newminster
Dam Queen Bess black 1886	Marden bay 1879	Hermit	Seclusion
Dam Queen Bess black 1886	Marden bay 1879	Barchettina	Pelion
Dam Queen Bess black 1886	Marden bay 1879	Barchettina	Cymba
Dam Queen Bess black 1886	Lizzie ch. 1882	Petrach	Lord Clifden
Dam Queen Bess black 1886	Lizzie ch. 1882	Petrach	Laura
Dam Queen Bess black 1886	Lizzie ch. 1882	Rose of Lancaster	Doncaster
Dam Queen Bess black 1886	Lizzie ch. 1882	Rose of Lancaster	Rouge Rose
