= Top Flight =

Thoroughbred racehorse

- Sire: Dis Donc
- Grandsire: Sardanapale
- Dam: Flyatit
- Damsire: Peter Pan
- Sex: Filly
- Foaled: 1929
- Country: United States
- Colour: Brown
- Breeder: Harry Payne Whitney
- Owner: Cornelius Vanderbilt Whitney
- Trainer: Thomas J. Healey
- Record: 16: 12-0-0
- Earnings: $275,900

Major wins
- Saratoga Special Stakes (1931); Spinaway Stakes (1931); Matron Stakes (1931); Arlington-Washington Lassie Stakes (1931); Clover Stakes (1931); Belmont Futurity Stakes (1931); Pimlico Futurity (1931); Acorn Stakes (1932); Coaching Club American Oaks (1932); Arlington Oaks (1932); Alabama Stakes (1932); Ladies Handicap (1932)

Awards
- American Champion Two-Year-Old Filly (1931); American Champion Three-Year-Old Filly (1932)

Honours
- United States' Racing Hall of Fame (1966) #66 - Top 100 U.S. Racehorses of the 20th Century; Top Flight Handicap at Aqueduct Racetrack

Top Flight (April 15, 1929 – 1949) was an American U.S. Hall of Fame Thoroughbred racehorse. She was the leading American filly of her generation at two and three years of age.

== Background ==
Bred in Kentucky by the very prominent horseman Harry Payne Whitney, she was a daughter of the French stakes winner Dis Donc, a son of the French Champion Sire Sardanapale. She was out of the mare Flyatit, a daughter of U.S. Racing Hall of Fame inductee Peter Pan.

== Racing career ==
Raced under the colors of Cornelius Vanderbilt Whitney, who had inherited Top Flight on his father's death in 1930, at age two the filly went undefeated in her seven starts and earned a record $219,000. Even a muddy track couldn't stop her from winning June's Clover Stakes, and she also beat top colts in the prestigious Futurity Stakes at New York's Belmont Park and the Pimlico Futurity at Laurel Park Racecourse in Laurel, Maryland. Top Flight's performances earned her 1931 American Champion Two-Year-Old Filly honors.

Racing at age three, she won five of her nine starts, with three of her losses coming against males. After finishing fourth in the Potomac Handicap, she was retired as the all-time money earning filly or mare in American racing history. Top Flight was retrospectively named American Champion Three-Year-Old Filly.

== Assessment ==
In 1966, Top Flight was inducted into the United States' Racing Hall of Fame. In the Blood-Horse magazine List of the Top 100 Racehorses of the 20th Century, she was ranked No. 66.

In a poll among members of the American Trainers Association, conducted in 1955 by Delaware Park Racetrack, Top Flight was voted the fourth greatest filly in American racing history. Gallorette was voted first.

== Breeding days ==
As a broodmare, Top Flight had limited success, producing one stakes winner, Flight Command, from her seven foals. She died in 1949 and was buried at C. V. Whitney's farm (now part of Gainesway Farm) in Lexington, Kentucky.
