= Broadway Stakes =

- Class: Discontinued stakes
- Location: Gravesend Race Track; Gravesend, New York, United States
- Inaugurated: 1897
- Race type: Thoroughbred - Flat racing

Race information
- Distance: 1 1/16 miles (8.5 furlongs)
- Surface: Dirt
- Track: left-handed
- Qualification: Three-year-olds

The Broadway Stakes was an American Thoroughbred horse race held annually from 1897 thru 1910 at Gravesend Race Track in Gravesend, New York. A race for three-year-old horses of either sex, it was contested on dirt over a distance of a mile and one-sixteenth (8.5 furlongs).

== Historical notes ==
An event that would become a popular race that regularly drew some of America's top three-year-olds, the inaugural running of Broadway Stakes took place on June 15, 1897. It was the feature race on that day's Card and carried a purse of $5,000. The event was won by The Friar, a colt owned by brothers Alfred and Dave Morris and trained by future Hall of Fame inductee Wyndham Walden.

Sly Fox won the 1898 race in what would be a very successful year in which he won eight stakes including the future Triple Crown race, the Preakness Stakes. The 1901, 1902 and 1904 winners, The Parader and Old England and Bryn Mawr, would also win the Preakness Stakes.

The 1899 race was won by Perry Belmont's Ethelbert who went on to a year of racing success that would earn him recognition as the American Champion Three-Year-Old Colt. The 1909 Broadway Stakes winner Fitz Herbert, owned and trained by Sam Hildreth, would also earn American Champion Three-Year-Old Colt honors.

Irish Lad, the American Champion Two-Year-Old Male Horse of 1902, won the 1903 edition of the Broadway Stakes.

In 1906 Ormondale set a new track record for the mile and one-sixteenth distance in winning the Broadway Stakes with a time of 1:45 3/5.

On June 3, 1910, Prince Imperial would win what would turn out to be the final running of Gravesend Race Track's Broadway Stakes.

== Demise of a race and of a racetrack ==
The 1908 passage of the Hart–Agnew anti-betting legislation by the New York Legislature under Republican Governor Charles Evans Hughes led to a state-wide shutdown of racing in 1911 and 1912. A February 21, 1913 ruling by the New York Supreme Court, Appellate Division saw horse racing return in 1913. However, it was too late for the Gravesend horse racing facility and it never reopened.

In 1923, Aqueduct Racetrack created a Broadway Stakes that was run at the same mile and one-sixteenth distance. It was limited to three-year-old females and non-gelded males and was run for ten years.

In 1980 Aqueduct Racetrack initiated another Broadway Stakes that is still being run into 2021. A sprint race at 6 furlongs, it is restricted to New York Bred fillies and mares age four and up.

== Records ==
Speed record:

- 1:45 3/5: Ormondale (1906)

Most wins by a jockey:

- 2 - Guy Burns (1908, 1909)

Most wins by a trainer:

- 2 - Thomas Welsh (1906, 1910)

Most wins by an owner:

- no owner won this race more than once

== Winners ==
Year	Winner	Age	Jockey	Trainer	Owner	Dist. (Miles)	Time	Win$
1910	Prince Imperial	3	Eddie Dugan	Thomas Welsh	Woodhaven Stable (Robert Forsyth Little)	1-1/16 m	1:46.60	$1,900
1909	Fitz Herbert	3	Guy Burns	Sam Hildreth	Sam Hildreth	1-1/16 m	1:47.00	$1,925
1908	Master Robert	3	Guy Burns	Andrew G. Blakely	Samuel Emery	1-1/16 m	1:45.80	$3,970
1907	Montgomery	3	Herman Radtke	Frank E. Brown	Emil Herz	1-1/16 m	1:46.80	$3,550
1906	Ormondale	3	Walter Miller	Thomas Welsh	Ormondale Stable (William O'Brien Macdonough)	1-1/16 m	1:45.60	$3,540
1905	Oxford	3	Frank O'Neill	James J. McLaughlin	James J. McLaughlin	1-1/16 m	1:48.00	$3,050
1904	Bryn Mawr	3	Lucien Lyne	W. Fred Presgrave	Goughacres Stable (B. Frank Clyde & Thomas C. Clyde)	1-1/16 m	1:49.80	$3,335
1903	Irish Lad	3	Tommy Burns	John W. Rogers	Westbury Stable (Herman B. Duryea & Harry P. Whitney)	1-1/16 m	1:47.00	$3,330
1902	Old England	3	John Bullman	Green B. Morris	Green B. Morris	1-1/16 m	1:47.00	$2,340
1901	The Parader	3	Frank Landry	Thomas J. Healey	Richard T. Wilson Jr.	1-1/16 m	1:49.00	$1,815
1900	Sarmatian	3	Milton Henry	Lewis Elmore	William J. Arkell & Lewis Elmore	1-1/16 m	1:49.20	$2,245
1899	Ethelbert	3	Henry Spencer	A. Jack Joyner	Perry Belmont	1-1/16 m	1:47.80	
1898	Sly Fox	3	Willie Simms	Hardy Campbell Jr.	Charles F. Dwyer	1-1/16 m	1:48.00	
1897	The Friar	3	Fred Littlefield	R. Wyndham Walden	Alfred H. & Dave H. Morris	1-1/16 m	1:49.50	
