= Charles Kohler =

Romanian footballer

Personal information
- Date of birth: 9 October 1900
- Place of birth: Geneva, Switzerland
- Date of death: 8 December 1979 (aged 79)
- Position: Striker

Senior career*
Years	Team	Apps	(Gls)
1921–1925	Tricolor București		
1925–1926	Juventus București		
1926–1929	Unirea Tricolor București		

International career
1925	Romania	1	(0)
- * Club domestic league appearances and goals

Charles Kohler (9 October 1900 – 8 December 1979) was a Swiss-born Romanian football striker.

== International career ==
Charles Kohler played one game at international level for Romania in a 1925 friendly which ended with a 2–1 loss against Turkey.

== Honours ==
Tricolor București

- Divizia A: 1920–21
