= Frank O'Neill (jockey) =

American jockey

- Frank O'Neill on Beldame

Personal information
- Born: 1886 Newton, Kansas, United States
- Died: 1960 (aged 73–74) United States
- Occupations: Jockey & Owner

Horse racing career
- Sport: Horse racing

Major racing wins
- Selected American race wins: Autumn Maiden Stakes (1903); Brighton Derby (1903); Brooklyn Handicap (1903); Brooklyn Derby (1903, 1906); Century Handicap (1903); Great Trial Stakes (1903); Matron Stakes (1903); Neptune Stakes (1903); Rancho Del Paso Stakes (1903); Saratoga Special Stakes (1903); September Stakes (1903, 1904); Travers Stakes (1903); Zephyr Stakes (1904); Alabama Stakes (1904); Astoria Stakes (1904); Carter Handicap (1904); Dolphin Stakes (1904, 1905); Double Event Stakes (part 1) (1904); First Special Stakes (1904); Gazelle Handicap (1904); Great American Stakes (1904); Lawrence Realization Stakes (1904); Mermaid Stakes (1904); Saratoga Cup (1904); Second Special Stakes (1904, 1905); Adirondack Stakes (1905); Aqueduct Handicap (1905); Broadway Stakes (1905); Daisy Stakes (1905); Juvenile Stakes (1905); National Stallion Stakes (1905); Russet Stakes (1905); Saranac Handicap (1905); Spinaway Stakes (1905); Spindrift Stakes (1905); Suburban Handicap (1905); Manhattan Handicap (1905); Toboggan Handicap (1905); Vernal Stakes (1905) Selected European race wins: Prix Exbury (1910, 1913, 1920, 1924); Prix de La Jonchère (1910, 1911, 1920); Prix du Président de la République (1910, 1913); Prix Biennal (1910, 1913); Prix Kergorlay (1910, 1913); Prix La Rochette (1910 (2), 1911, 1913, 1919); Prix Morny (1910); Critérium International (1911, 1924); Prix des Chênes (1911, 1912, 1920, 1922, 1923); Prix Robert Papin (1911); Prix de Royaumont (1911); Furstenberg-Rennen (1911); Ascot Gold Cup (1912); Doncaster Cup (1912); Eclipse Stakes (1912); Jockey Club Stakes (1912); Prix du Cadran (1913); Prix du Pin (1913, 1922, 1926); Prix de Guiche (1919, 1922); Prix Chloé (1923, 1924); Lincolnshire Handicap (1924) British Classic Races wins: St. Leger Stakes (1911); Epsom Derby (1920); Epsom Oaks (1923) French Classic Races wins: Prix du Jockey Club (1909, 1917); Grand Prix de Paris (1917); Poule d'Essai des Poulains (1919); Prix de l'Arc de Triomphe (1923)

Racing awards
- American Champion Jockey by stakes wins (1905); French Champion Jockey by wins (11 times)

Honours
- United States' Racing Hall of Fame (1956)

Significant horses
- Beldame, Roseben, Prince Palatine, Spion Kop, Sir Gallahad III, Straitlace, Parth
- Updated on July 1, 2007

Francis O'Neill (1886–1960) was an American Hall of Fame jockey who won top stakes races in the United States but whose career was cut short by the catastrophic impact of the Hart–Agnew Law anti-betting legislation. He had no choice but to find work in Europe and in 1908, he and trainer Fred Burlew went to race in Europe from a base in France where they had much success. O'Neill won three British and four French Classic Races and was the annual Champion Rider in France eleven times in fourteen years. Among notable owners, O'Neill rode for the American William Kissam Vanderbilt and French owner Baron Edouard A. de Rothschild.
