= Lamplighter (horse) =

American-bred Thoroughbred racehorse

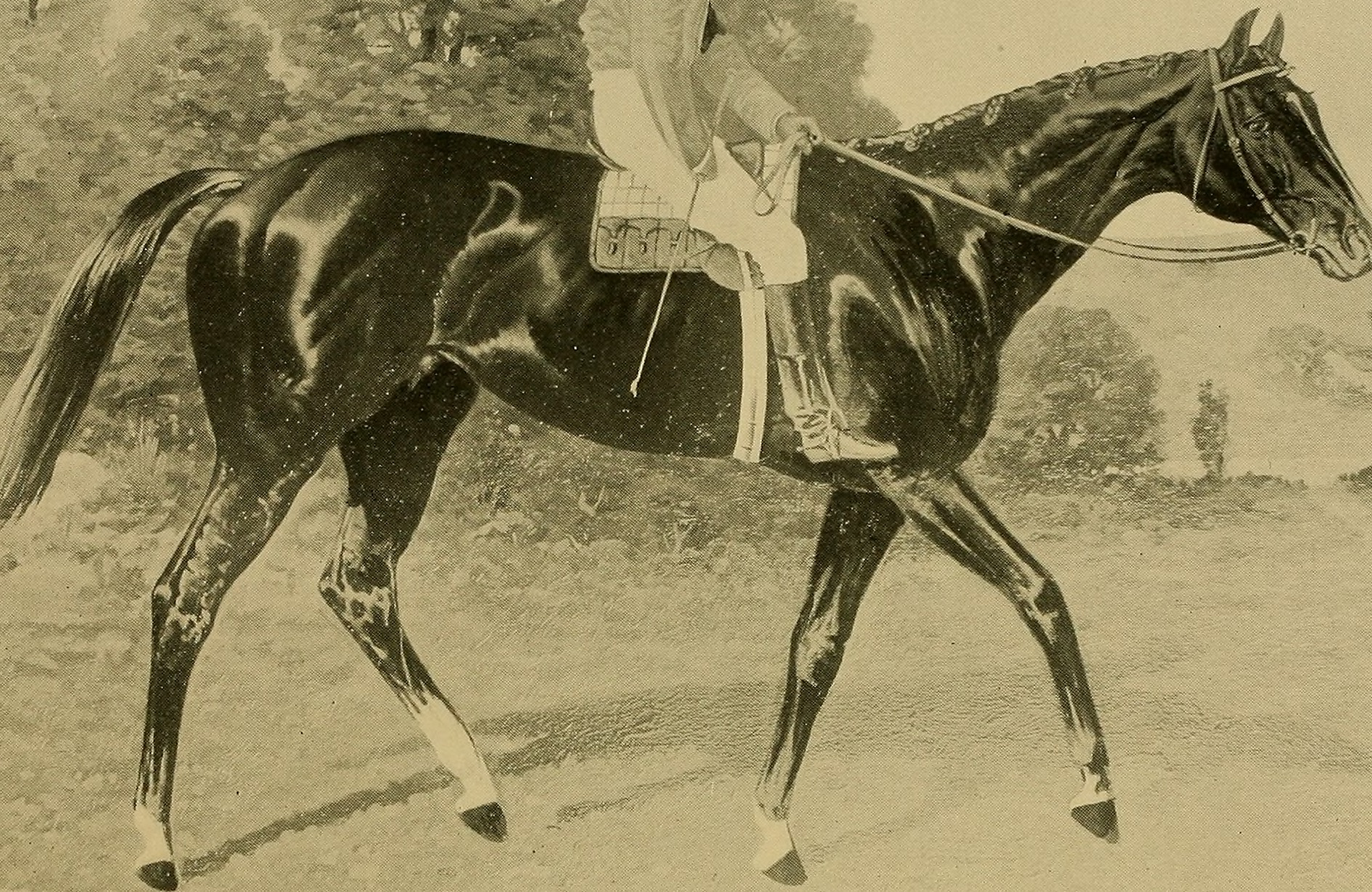
- From The American turf (1898)
- Sire: Spendthrift
- Grandsire: Australian
- Dam: Torchlight
- Damsire: Speculum
- Sex: Stallion
- Foaled: 1889
- Country: United States
- Colour: Bay
- Breeder: Spendthrift Stud (Overton H. Chenault)
- Owner: 1) Samuel S. Brown; 2) Pierre Lorillard; 3) Gottfried Walbaum
- Trainer: 1) John W. Rogers; 2) John Huggins
- Record: 66: 29-15-9
- Earnings: US$88,545

Major wins
- First Special Stakes (1892, 1893); Second Special Stakes (1892); Twin City Handicap (1892); Thistle Stakes (1892; Champion Stakes (1892); Fall Stakes (1893); Labor Day Stakes (1893); Oriental Handicap (1893); Standard Stakes (1893); Maturity Stakes (1893)

Awards
- American Co-Champion Handicap Male Horse (1893)

Honors
- Lamplighter Stakes at Monmouth Park

Lamplighter (foaled 1889 in Kentucky) was an American Champion Thoroughbred racehorse for whom the Lamplighter Stakes at Monmouth Park Racetrack is named.

== Racing career ==
Bred by Overton Chenault's breeding partnership at his Spendthrift Stud in Lexington, Kentucky, Lamplighter was purchased by Samuel Brown who raced him as a two-year-old and into late summer of his three-year-old season under the care of future U.S. Racing Hall of Fame trainer, John Rogers. On August 10, 1892, the day after Lamplighter's win in the Champion Stakes at Monmouth Park Racetrack, Samuel Brown sold Lamplighter to Pierre Lorillard for $30,000. Under new trainer John Huggins, Lamplighter continued to compete successfully and would be named the 1893 American Co-Champion Handicap Male Horse. In August 1893, Pierre Lorillard sold Lamplighter to Saratoga Race Course owner Gottfried "Dutch Fred" Walbaum. In September Walbaum organized a match race between Lamplighter and the Marcus Daly owned Tammany. A major event, the Boston Sunday Post reported that "The Betting About Even" and opined that it was "Sure To Be One Of the Greatest Matches In The History of Racing" Tammany who won by four lengths.

== Pedigree ==
Pedigree of Lamplighter, brown horse, 1889
Sire Spendthrift	Australian	West Australian	Melbourne
Sire Spendthrift	Australian	West Australian	Mowerina
Sire Spendthrift	Australian	Emilia	Young Emilius
Sire Spendthrift	Australian	Emilia	Persian
Sire Spendthrift	Aerolite	Lexington	Boston
Sire Spendthrift	Aerolite	Lexington	Alice Carneal
Sire Spendthrift	Aerolite	Florine	Glencoe
Sire Spendthrift	Aerolite	Florine	Melody
Dam Torchlight	Speculum	Vedette	Voltiguer
Dam Torchlight	Speculum	Vedette	Mrs. Ridgway
Dam Torchlight	Speculum	Doralice	Orlando
Dam Torchlight	Speculum	Doralice	Preserve
Dam Torchlight	Midnight	King Tom	Harkaway
Dam Torchlight	Midnight	King Tom	Pocahantas
Dam Torchlight	Midnight	Starlight	Kremlin
Dam Torchlight	Midnight	Starlight	Evening Star (family: 14-e)
