= Beldame =

American-bred Thoroughbred racehorse

- Beldame, Frank O'Neill up
- Sire: Octagon
- Grandsire: Rayon d'Or
- Dam: Bella Donna
- Damsire: Hermit
- Sex: Mare
- Foaled: 1901
- Country: United States
- Colour: Chestnut
- Breeder: August Belmont Jr.
- Owner: August Belmont Jr.
- Trainer: John J. Hyland; Fred Burlew
- Record: 31: 17-6-4
- Earnings: $102,570

Major wins
- Great Filly Stakes (1903); Vernal Stakes (1903); Alabama Stakes (1904); Gazelle Handicap (1904); Carter Handicap (1904); Ladies Handicap (1904); Mermaid Stakes (1904); Saratoga Cup (1904); First Special Stakes (1904); Second Special Stakes (1904); Dolphin Stakes (1904); September Stakes (1904); Standard Handicap (1905); Suburban Handicap (1905)

Awards
- American Champion Three-Year-Old Filly (1904); American Horse of the Year (1904)

Honours
- U.S. Racing Hall of Fame (1956) #98 - Top 100 U.S. Racehorses of the 20th Century; Beldame Stakes at Belmont Park
- Last updated on October 31, 2006

Beldame (1901–1924) was an American racehorse and broodmare.

== Background ==
The chestnut filly was foaled near Lexington, Kentucky, in 1901. She was by Octagon, out of the English-bred Bella Donna (by The Derby winner Hermit). Named Beldame, she was a homebred of August Belmont Jr.'s (after whose family the Belmont Stakes as well as Belmont Park were named), and though Belmont Jr. continued to own her, he leased her as a two- and three-year-old to a business associate named Newton Bennington. Although she won two races before going to Bennington, it was while racing for him that Beldame began her successful career, earning her place as number 98 in the Blood-Horse magazine List of the Top 100 U.S. Racehorses of the 20th Century.

== Career and retirement ==
As a two-year-old, Beldame won the Great Filly Stakes at Sheepshead Bay Race Track and the Vernal Stakes (wiring the field).

When Beldame was three, she won twelve of her fourteen starts, earning the championship of her division. Her only losses came against older males. That year, she took the Alabama Stakes, the Gazelle Handicap (by ten lengths on a sloppy track), the Carter Handicap (against males by over two lengths under a stout hold), the Ladies Stakes, the Saratoga Cup, the First Special, the Second Special, the Dolphin Sakes, the Mermaid Stakes (winning by seven lengths and drawing away from the field even as she was being eased up), and the September Stakes.

In the Ladies Stakes, Beldame got loose under her substitute rider before the race and galloped around the track in search of an opening to run back to the barn. She found it before her jockey, Gene Hildebrand, got her under control. She returned to the track minutes later, wired the race, and won easily.

Due to her success, track officials weighted Beldame so heavily she won only twice at the age of four. That year, she won the Standard Handicap, and then, carrying more weight than the males, she won the Suburban Handicap, beating Broomstick by five lengths.

Beldame retired with 17 wins, 6 places, and 4 shows from 31 starts. Her total earnings were $102,570. Following Firenze and Miss Woodford, she was the third filly to win more than $100,000. Her usual rider was Hall of Famer Frank O'Neill. Her first trainer, when she was campaigned by Belmont, was Hall of Famer John Hyland. While she was leased to Bennington, Hall of Famer Fred Burlew trained her.

After Beldame's retirement, Belmont took her to the recreation of his father's Nursery Stud, the original farm being dispersed after August Belmont's death.

== Honors ==
In a poll among members of the American Trainers Association conducted in 1955 by Delaware Park Racetrack, Beldame was voted the seventh greatest filly in American racing history. Gallorette was voted first.

Beldame, who died in 1924, was inducted into the National Museum of Racing and Hall of Fame in 1956.
