= Clifford (horse) =

American-bred Thoroughbred racehorse

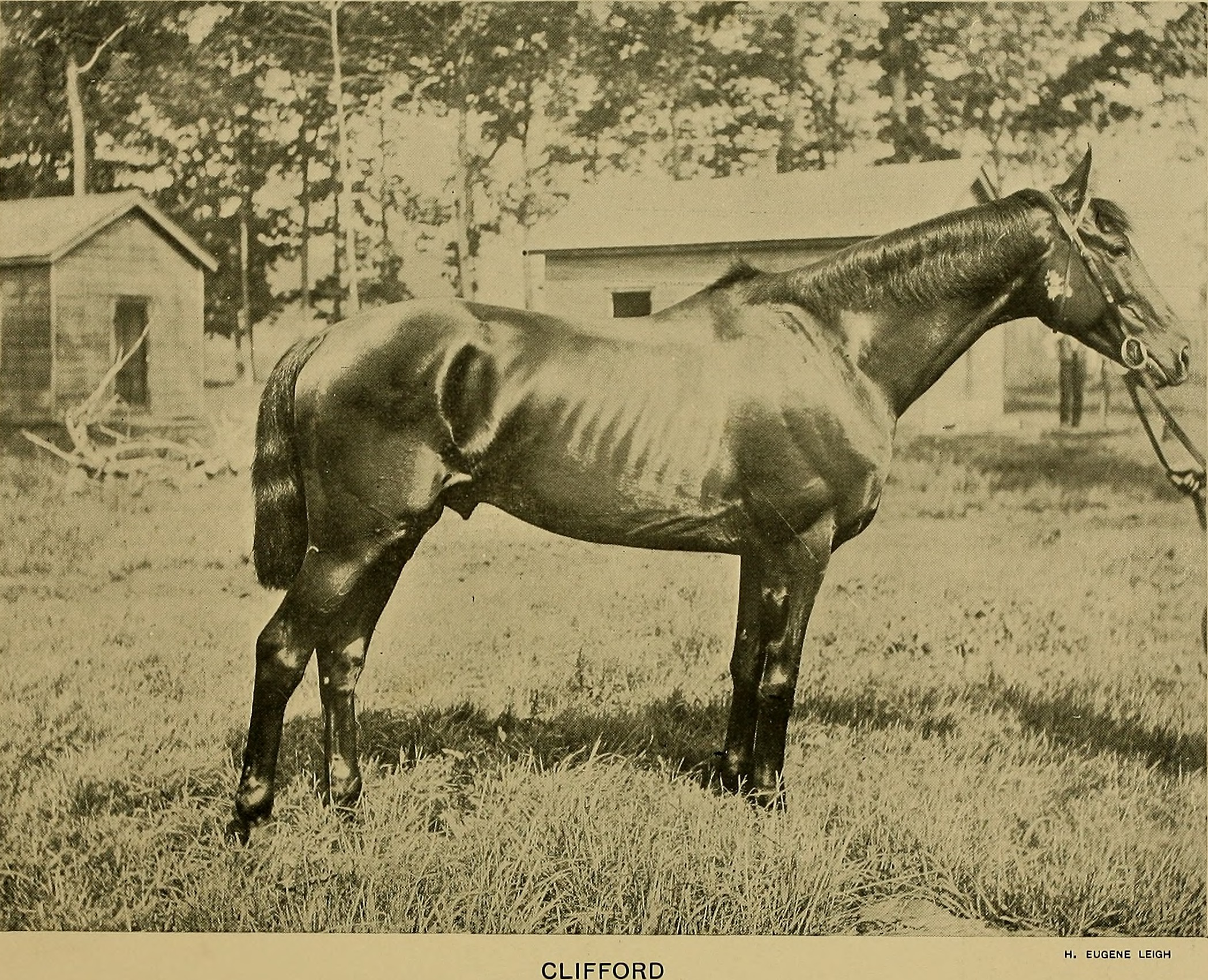
- From The American turf (1898)
- Sire: Bramble
- Grandsire: Bonnie Scotland
- Dam: Duchess
- Damsire: Kingfisher
- Sex: Stallion
- Foaled: 1890
- Country: United States
- Colour: Dark Bay
- Breeder: Belle Meade Stud
- Owner: 1) W. J. Cherry (1891); 2) Clifford Porter (1891); 3) H. Eugene Leigh & Robert L. Rose (12/1892); 4) H. Eugene Leigh (9/1894); 5) Hurricana Stud (John Sanford)
- Trainer: 1) Frank M. Kelly; 2) H. Eugene Leigh; 3) John W. Rogers (1894)
- Record: 62: 42-10-8
- Earnings: US$65,143

Major wins
- Latonia Spring Prize Handicap (1893); Melrose Handicap (1893); Oriental Handicap (1893); Phoenix Handicap (1893); Special Sweepstakes (1893); Sea Foam Stakes (1894); Flight Stakes (1894, 1896); Second Special Stakes (1894, 1895); Montgomery Handicap (1894); Club Members Handicap (1895); Kearney Stakes (1895, 1897); Omnium Handicap (1895); Oriental Handicap (1895); Memorial Handicap (1896); Long Island Handicap (1897)

Awards
- American Champion Three-Year-Old Male Horse (1893); American Champion Older Male Horse (1894)

Honours
- U.S. Racing Hall of Fame (2014)

Clifford (1890–1917) was a Thoroughbred racehorse who was inducted into the National Museum of Racing and Hall of Fame in 2014.

== Background ==
Clifford was a dark bay or brown horse with a white spot on his right jowel that was perceived by many as ugly and weak. The New York Times said about him, "As a yearling he was one of the poorest-looking animals of the lot in which he was offered for sale, and nothing great was expected of him." However, he ultimately became, according to the Times, "one of the most brilliant performers the American turf has ever known." Clifford was sired by the stallion Bramble and was out of the good racemare Duchess, who was sired by Kingfisher. He was foaled in Nashville, Tennessee, at W. H. Jackson's Belle Meade Stud. W.J. Cherry purchased the horse for $900 at Belle Meade's auction on April 27, 1891, and sold him shortly thereafter to Clifford Porter, who named the horse after himself. Although he only owned him for his first race. After he broke his maiden he was bought for $4,000 by Robert L Rose and Eugene Leigh.

== Theft ==
Entering his 3-year-old season Clifford had only one start under his belt from the previous year but it was a maiden victory. On January 27, 1893, he was stolen from his trainer Eugene Leigh's farm. The thief had gotten on Clifford's back and rode off with him. Riding the horse 18 miles near Paris Kentucky but was stopped when Clifford became sore as he was not wearing any shoes. Unable to take the horse any further the thief left him in a farmer's field. He was quickly found and brought back to his original stable with a $500 reward for the capture of the thief but nothing came up afterward. It would be the first theft of a horse in Lexington since the Civil War.

== Racing career ==
After his theft, he resumed training with new owners Eugene Leigh and Robert Rose. And soon made his seasonal debut which became one of the two races he finished worse than third. He returned quickly and took the Phoenix Handicap. This kicked off a year that would see him win 18 total races. Remarkably 11 of those wins came in a span of just 5 weeks. He also won these races carrying very high imposts. The most he won with was 133 pounds. Regularly his opponents would carry 25 or fewer pounds.

He'd finally reach his limit in start number 12 when he was forced to carry 140 pounds in the Austin Handicap. Resulting in a third-place finish in which the winner was carrying only 104 pounds. It turned out to be only a small hiccup as he returned very quickly to take a $7,000 sweepstakes at Hawthorne shortly after. His last win that year came on October 28, 1893. When he was put in a special 3 horse race against a talented mare named Yo Tambien and Lamplighter who went on to be that year's Co-Champion Handicap Horse. He beat Yo Tambien by 8 1/4 lengths and Lamplighter by 11. Securing him as the Champion 3-Year-Old-Male of that year.

As a 4-year-old Clifford, he would start out the season the same way he did the previous year. With his second off-the-board performance. This time it would be in the Brooklyn Handicap where he lost all chance after missing the start. But after this, he never finished worse than third in his career ever again. After starting another streak of stakes wins he was yet again transferred to a new trainer. Eugene Leigh bought out Robert Rose's stake in the horse for $25,000 and handed him over to John W. Rogers to be trained. Most remember his 4-year-old year due to the 3-way rivalry that spawned between him and two 3-year-olds horses. Belmont Stakes winner Henry Of Navarre and the 1893 Horse Of The Year Domino. The first time he met either of them was in a match race with Domino which had Domio prevail by 3/4 of a length. Domino then dead-heated with Henry Of Navarre just a start later. Clifford then got to race Henry Of Navarre in their own match race only a week after. This time Clifford got the nose over Henry Of Navarre setting the stage for all 3 to race together.

25,000 people attended to watch the 3 horses race. It took 2 false starts as Clifford initially refused to run showing more temper than he usually did. But on the third try, Domino and Henry Of Navarre broke together with Clifford just behind them. Clifford trailed the majority of the race until Domino started to fade. He passed the tired horse who ended up being 10 lengths behind his rivals and chased after Henry Of Navarre. He couldn't catch him and would be held off by 3/4 of a length. By the end of the year, Clifford had won 10 races and took home American Champion Handicap Male Horse but lost horse of the year to Henry Of Navarre. The three would face off again in 1895 in a field of 5 horses. Clifford again would be second to Henry Of Navarre this time by double the margin 1 1/2 lengths and Domino again was distantly defeated. But Clifford would hand Henry Of Navarre the final defeat of his career when he won the Oriental Handicap only 4 days later. Clifford stayed strong at 5 to win 7 of 10 races that year. But as a 6 and 7-year-old, he ran less frequently. In both years he won exactly 3 races still in handicap races. He would have one final battle with Henry Of Navarre at age 6 in the Suburban Handicap with Henry Of Navarre winning and Clifford finishing third. At 7 his two notable wins were in the Kearney Handicap where he dead-heated with Hastings the 1896 Belmont Stakes winner and Grandsire of Man o' War. And the Long Island Handicap where he carried top weight and defeated Ben Brush the previous year's Kentucky Derby winner which would also be his final career win. But his final race was in the Omnium Handicap where he finished third and came up sore forcing his retirement.

== Retirement ==
John Sanford bought Clifford for $7,000 and stood him at stud. He would produce some solid runners including Molly Brant, Hill Top, Kennyetto, Cliff Edge, Sea Cliff, and Blackford. Champion boxer John L. Sullivan was a fan, who followed him closely when he raced and frequently visited him in retirement.
