= Gravesend Race Track =

Horse racing course in Brooklyn, New York

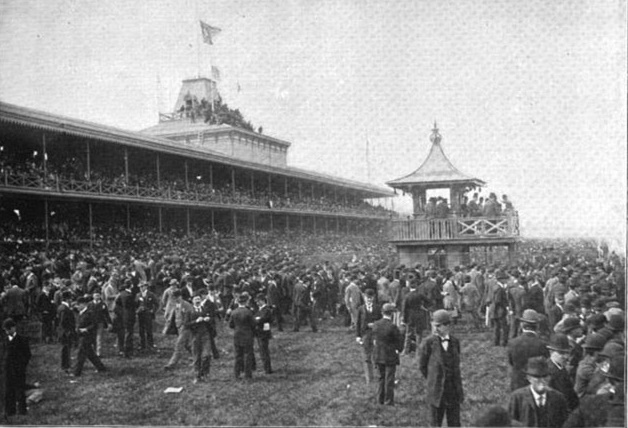
- Crowd at the 1893 Brooklyn Handicap won by Diabolo at Gravesend Race Track

- Location within New York City Location within New York
- Location: Gravesend, Brooklyn, New York 11225
- Coordinates: 40°36′04″N 73°58′10″W
- Owner: Brooklyn Jockey Club
- Surface: Natural Grass (turf)

Construction
- Opened: 1886
- Closed: 1907
- Demolished: 1922

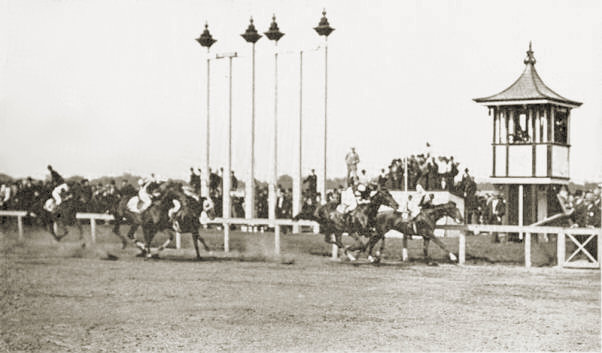
"The Picket" winning the 1904 Brooklyn Handicap at Gravesend Race Track

Gravesend Race Track was a Thoroughbred horse racing facility in the Gravesend neighborhood of Brooklyn, New York, that opened in 1886 and closed in 1910. The track was built by the Brooklyn Jockey Club with the backing of Philip and Michael Dwyer, two wealthy racing stable owners known as the Dwyer Brothers. Philip, the controlling shareholder of the Brooklyn Jockey Club, served as its president.

Gravesend Race Track hosted the Preakness Stakes for fourteen years, from 1894 to 1907.

== History ==
Opened on August 26, 1886, its first executive board consisted of:

- Col. William L. Scott
- James Ben Ali Haggin
- Michael F. Dwyer
- Elias J. "Lucky" Baldwin
- Capt. Samuel S. Brown

The facility covered an area which extended from McDonald Avenue (then Gravesend Avenue) to Ocean Parkway, and from Kings Highway to Avenue U. This land had previously been occupied by the Prospect Park Fair Grounds, a slightly smaller and far more modest race course which had been used for harness racing. The facility was enclosed by a twelve-foot wooden fence and boasted an ornate two-story "double decker" grand stand of yellow Georgia pine with a bar and restaurant built into its brick base.

A spur was created that allowed trains running along the Prospect Park & Coney Island railroad line to stop within the facility and discharge passengers at a small station that led directly to the grand stand via a covered walkway. At the southern end of the facility stood the offices of the Brooklyn Jockey Club, as well as the dressing rooms for the jockeys. The northern end was occupied by the betting pavilion and carriage sheds. The eastern side, which ran along the tree-lined boulevard of Ocean Parkway (where impromptu training races often took place), was occupied by the clubhouse.

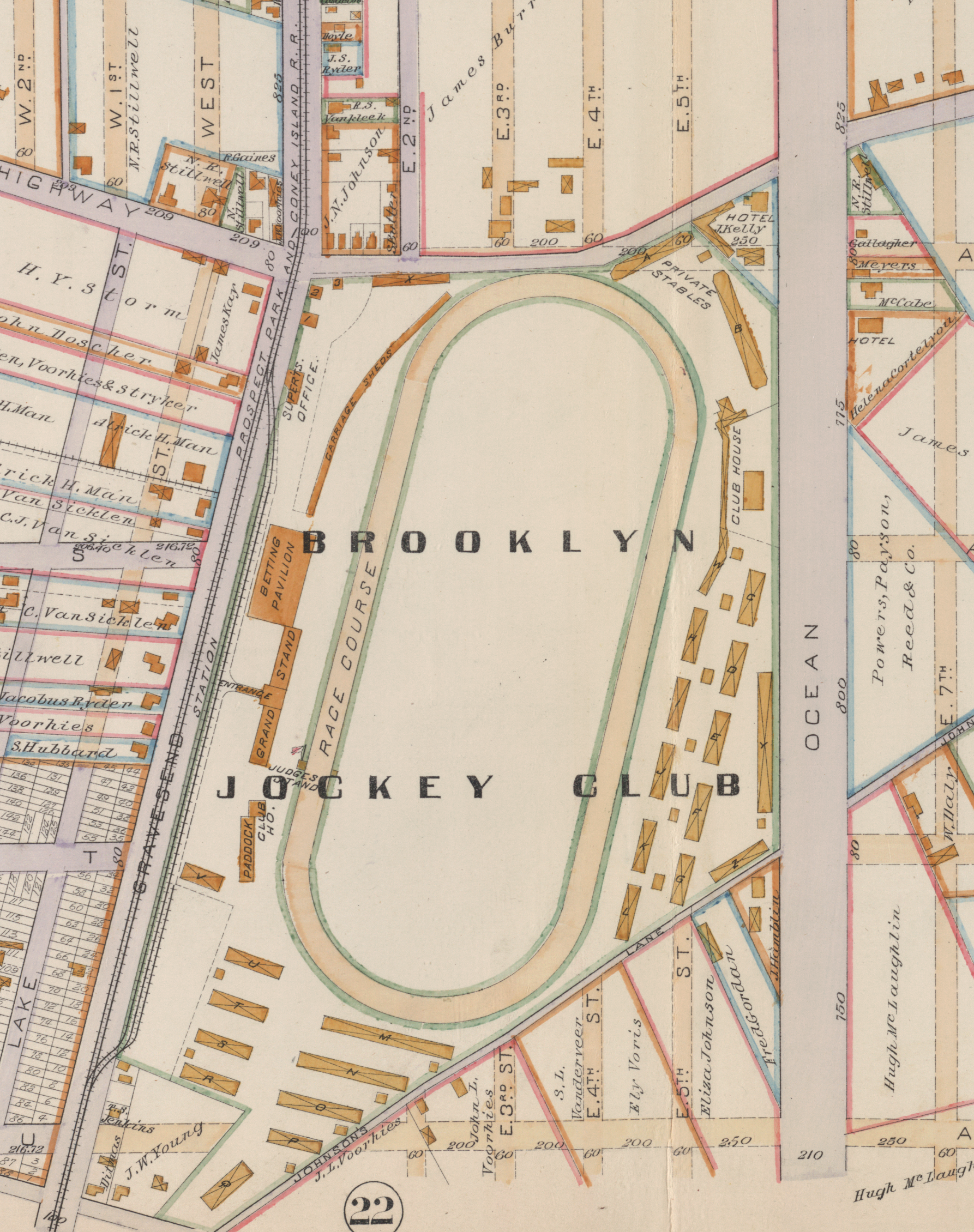
“Brooklyn Jockey Club” with race course, club house, stables and betting pavilion on an 1889 map.

During its time, the racetrack executive included superintendent Ben Brush in whose honor the future U.S. Racing Hall of Fame horse Ben Brush was named. Among the major graded stakes races launched at the track were the Astoria Stakes, Brooklyn Handicap, Brooklyn Derby, Tremont Stakes, and the Gazelle Handicap. For the fifteen years from 1894 through 1908, Gravesend Race Track hosted one of the American Classic Races, the Preakness Stakes.

In 1908, the administration of Governor Charles Evans Hughes signed into law the Hart–Agnew bill that effectively banned all racetrack betting in New York State. A 1910 amendment to the legislation added further restrictions that meant by 1911 all racetracks in the state ceased operations. Although the law was repealed in time to resume racing in 1913, the Gravesend Race Track never reopened and the land was eventually sold to real-estate developers in 1920.

Today, the annual Gravesend Handicap at Aqueduct Racetrack honors the former racing facility.

== Thoroughbred Flat races ==
- Albemarle Stakes
- Astoria Stakes
- Bedford Stakes
- Broadway Stakes
- Brookdale Handicap
- Brooklyn Handicap
- Carlton Stakes
- Castleton Stakes
- Clover Stakes
- Criterion Stakes
- Culver Handicap
- Brooklyn Derby
- Expectation Stakes
- Flatlands Stakes
- First Special Stakes
- Second Special Stakes
- Gazelle Handicap
- Great American Stakes
- Hanover Stakes
- Holly Stakes
- Hudson Stakes
- Junior Champion Stakes
- Manhanset Stakes
- Myrtle Stakes
- Oceanview Handicap
- Occidental Handicap
- Oriental Handicap
- Parkway Handicap
- Patchogue Stakes
- Preakness Stakes
- Prospect Handicap
- Seabreeze Stakes
- Southampton Handicap
- Speculation Stakes
- Standard Stakes
- Tremont Stakes
- Willow Handicap

=== Steeplechase races ===
- Greater New York Steeplechase Handicap
- Hitchcock Steeplechase Handicap

== Other defunct New York race tracks ==
- Brighton Beach Race Course
- Jamaica Race Course
- Jerome Park Racetrack
- Morris Park Racecourse
- Roosevelt Raceway
- Sheepshead Bay Race Track
- Union Course
