= Fred Burlew =

American horse trainer

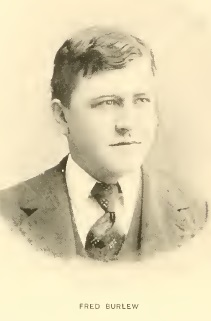

Personal information
- Born: March 20, 1871 Cincinnati, Ohio
- Died: May 3, 1927 (aged 56) Manhattan, New York
- Occupation: Trainer

Horse racing career
- Sport: Horse racing
- Career wins: 977 (inc. 124 stakes)

Major racing wins
- United States: Dash Stakes (1900); Golden Rod Stakes (1900); Great Filly Stakes (1903); Vernal Stakes (1903, 1905); Alabama Stakes (1904); Astoria Stakes (1904); Dolphin Stakes (1904); Gazelle Handicap (1904); Carter Handicap (1904); Double Event Stakes (part 1) (1904); Great American Stakes (1904); Juvenile Stakes (1904, 1905); Ladies Handicap (1904); Laureate Stakes (1904); Mermaid Stakes (1904); Saratoga Cup (1904); First Special Stakes (1904); Second Special Stakes (1904); September Stakes (1904); National Stallion Stakes (1905); Brooklyn Derby (1906); Grand Union Hotel Stakes (1906); Pierrepont Handicap (1906); Fashion Stakes (1907); Hudson Stakes (1907); Neptune Stakes (1907); Spring Stakes (1907); Tremont Stakes (1920); United States Hotel Stakes (1921); Hopeful Stakes (1921); Pimlico Futurity (1921); Saratoga Special Stakes (1921) Europe: Prix de la Salamandre (1911); Prix La Flèche (1913) Triple Crown Race wins: Kentucky Derby (1922)

Significant horses
- Morvich, Beldame

Frederick Burlew (March 20, 1871 – May 3, 1927) was an American Thoroughbred racehorse trainer. He was the trainer of the winning horse of the Kentucky Derby in 1922. He was inducted into the National Museum of Racing and Hall of Fame in 1973.
