= Philip J. Dwyer =

American businessman and racehorse owner

- Born: August 21, 1844; Brooklyn, New York, U.S.
- Died: June 9, 1917 (aged 72); Manhattan, New York, U.S.
- Resting place: Holy Cross Cemetery, Brooklyn
- Occupations: Businessman: Wholesale meat distribution Racehorse/racetrack owner

Philip Joseph Dwyer (August 21, 1844 – June 9, 1917) was an American businessman from Brooklyn, New York and prominent owner of Thoroughbred racehorses and racetracks. Along with his younger brother, Michael F. Dwyer, he made a fortune in the meat packing industry, supplying butcher shops, eating establishments and hotels.

== Thoroughbred racing ==
In 1874 the Dwyer brothers entered the sport of Thoroughbred racing, building their Dwyer Brothers Stable into one of the top racing operations in the United States. Between them, they won the Kentucky Derby twice, the Preakness Stakes once, and the Belmont Stakes five times in the six years from 1883 through 1888. They owned and raced some of the best horses in the history of American Thoroughbred flat racing including four that have been inducted in the National Museum of Racing and Hall of Fame. In 1890, the Dwyers decided to dissolve their formal racing partnership. Mike Dwyer went on to enjoy further racing success and gained control of the New Jersey Jockey Club that operated a racetrack in Elizabeth, New Jersey.

Philip Dwyer raced horses for the joy of the sport, while his brother Mike became notorious for betting enormous amounts of money on the outcome of races. The New York Times newspaper reported that he died "in poor circumstances" as a result of his heavy gambling.

== Racetrack ownership ==
During the 1880s, the Dwyer brothers entered into a leasing arrangement for the Prospect Park Fair Grounds Trotting Track which they operated so successfully that they decided to build their own racing facility. In 1887 they established the Brooklyn Jockey Club which built and operated the Gravesend Race Track at Gravesend on Coney Island, New York. Philip Dwyer was the controlling shareholder of the Brooklyn Jockey Club, and served as its president.

Following the 1904 death of Thomas Reilly, founding president of the Queens County Jockey Club, Philip Dwyer acquired a fifty percent shareholding of the company that owned and operated Aqueduct Racetrack in Queens. As president of the Aqueduct track, a position he held until his death in 1917, Philip Dwyer purchased additional land, increased the track's circumference, and rebuilt the viewing stands. His efforts helped make the very profitable racetrack a major New York City racing center.

On August 21, 1913, Philip Dwyer and fellow New Yorker James Butler acquired control of the Laurel Park Racecourse in Maryland and hired Matt Winn to manage the operation.

== The Jockey Club ==
Organized by Pierre Lorillard IV in 1891 and chaired by John Hunter, the Racing Trust, more commonly referred to as the Board of Control, was the governing authority that oversaw the sport of horse racing in New York State. It was dominated by the Dwyer brothers and John A. Morris, a businessman known as the "lottery king" who owned the Morris Park Racecourse. In the early 1890s they came under severe criticism from a group of horse trainers who claimed the Dwyers routinely acted in their own self interests to the detriment of the competitors and the public. The trainers called for change and were soon joined by a group of prominent owners such as James R. Keene and August Belmont Jr. The matter culminated with the 1894 formation of The Jockey Club. However, the members of the old Board of Control were granted automatic membership in the new Jockey Club, including Philip Dwyer. The May 4, 1894 issue of The New York Times was very critical of the "new " Jockey Club in an article titled The Jockey Club Heard From; All The Earmarks of the Old Board of Control. Nonetheless, the Jockey Club eventually earned respect and continues to play an important role in the industry to this day.

At the age of seventy-two in 1917, Philip J. Dwyer died of pneumonia at the Hotel Wolcott in Midtown Manhattan. The following year, the Brooklyn Derby was renamed the Dwyer Stakes.
