= Michael F. Dwyer =

- Born: 1847; Brooklyn, New York, U.S.
- Died: 1906 (aged 58–59); New York City, U.S.
- Occupations: Businessman: Wholesale meat distribution Racehorse/Racetrack owner

Michael F. Dwyer (1847–1906) was an American businessman and prominent owner of Thoroughbred racehorses and racetracks from Brooklyn, New York. He and older brother Philip made a fortune in the meat packing industry, supplying butcher shops, eating establishments and hotels.

== Thoroughbred racing ==
In 1874 the Dwyer brothers entered the sport of Thoroughbred racing, building their Dwyer Brothers Stable into one of the top racing operations in the United States. Between them, they won the Kentucky Derby twice, the Preakness Stakes once, and the Belmont Stakes five times in the six years from 1883 through 1888. They owned and raced some of the best horses in the history of American Thoroughbred flat racing including four that have been inducted in the National Museum of Racing and Hall of Fame. In 1890, the Dwyers decided to dissolve their formal racing partnership. Mike Dwyer went on to enjoy further racing success and gained control of the New Jersey Jockey Club that operated a racetrack in Elizabeth, New Jersey.

== Racetrack ownership ==
During the 1880s, the Dwyer brothers entered into a leasing arrangement for the Prospect Park Fair Grounds Trotting Track which they operated so successfully that they decided to build their own racing facility. In 1887 they established the Brooklyn Jockey Club which built and operated the Gravesend Race Track at Gravesend on Coney Island, New York.

== The Racing Trust ==
Organized by Pierre Lorillard IV in 1891 and chaired by John Hunter, the Racing Trust, more commonly referred to as the Board of Control, was the governing authority that oversaw the sport of horse racing in New York State. It was dominated by the Dwyer brothers and John A. Morris, a businessman known as the "lottery king" who owned the Morris Park Racecourse. In the early 1890s they came under severe criticism from a group of horse trainers who claimed the Dwyers routinely acted in their own self interests to the detriment of the competitors and the public. The trainers called for change and were soon joined by a group of prominent owners such as James R. Keene and August Belmont, Jr. The matter culminated with the 1894 formation of The Jockey Club.

Mike Dwyer was notorious for betting enormous amounts of money on the outcome of horse races. He died in 1906 and in his brother Philip's 1917 obituary, the New York Times newspaper reported that Mike Dwyer "paralyzed the betting ring with the magnitude of his wagers" and died in "poor circumstances" as a result of his heavy gambling. The 2004 book Women of the Year - Ten Fillies Who Achieved Horse Racing's Highest Honor said that by the time Dwyer died, reporters believed that he had lost more than $1.5 million betting on favorites.

His eldest son, Charles F. Dwyer, who won the 1898 Preakness Stakes with the colt Sly Fox, would also become notorious for his gambling.
