= Spring Stakes (Sheepshead Bay) =

- Location: Sheepshead Bay Race Track, Sheepshead Bay, Brooklyn, New York
- Inaugurated: 1886
- Race type: Thoroughbred – Flat racing

Race information
- Distance: 5 furlongs (3,300 ft; 1,006 m)
- Track: Dirt, left-handed
- Qualification: Two-year-olds

The Spring Stakes was an American Thoroughbred horse race run on dirt for twenty-five years between 1886 and 1910 at Sheepshead Bay Race Track in Sheepshead Bay, Brooklyn, New York. Open to two-year-old horses, from inception through 1889 it was raced over a distance of 6 furlongs (3,960 ft; 1,207 m) and then from 1890 through 1909 it was run on the futurity course at a distance of 5 3/4 furlongs (3,795 ft; 1,157 m). Its final running in 1910 was at a distance of 5 furlongs (3,300 ft; 1,006 m).

== Historical notes ==
The inaugural running of the Spring Stakes took place on June 22, 1886. It was won by Tremont, a colt would who would finish the year having won all thirteen of his starts.

Scottish Chieftain, the 1896 winner, went on to win the 1897 Belmont Stakes which race would become the third leg of the U.S. Triple Crown series.

The 1900 edition of the Spring Stakes was won by Richard T. Wilson Jr.'s The Parader who would go on to win the 1901 Preakness Stakes, a race that would become the second leg of the U.S. Triple Crown series.

=== 1909: Eddie Dugan beat Eddie Dugan ===
The Spring Stakes of 1909 was won by Uncas Chief who went wire-to-wire under one of the country's top jockeys Eddie Dugan. Running second and in close pursuit throughout was a colt owned by Sam Hildreth named Eddie Dugan to honor the jockey.

== The End of a Race and of a Racetrack ==
Passage of the Hart–Agnew anti-betting legislation by the New York Legislature under Republican Governor Charles Evans Hughes led to a state-wide shutdown of racing in 1911 and 1912. A February 21, 1913 ruling by the New York Supreme Court, Appellate Division saw horse racing return in 1913. However, it was too late for the Sheepshead Bay horse racing facility and it never reopened.

== Records ==
Speed record:

- 1:09 2/5 @ 5 3/4 furlongs (3,795 ft; 1,157 m): Strathmeath (1890)
- 1:13 1/5 @ 6 furlongs (3,960 ft; 1,207 m): Chapultepec (1907)

Most wins by a jockey:

- 3 – Edward Garrison (1889, 1892, 1894)
- 3 – Fred Taral (1891, 1896, 1897)

Most wins by a trainer:

- 3 – Frank McCabe (1886, 1888, 1889)
- 3 – John J. Hyland (1894, 1895, 1897)

Most wins by an owner:

- 3 – Dwyer Brothers Stable (1894, 1895, 1897)

== Winners ==
Year	Winner	Age	Jockey	Trainer	Owner	Dist. (Miles)	Time	Win$
1910	Round The World	2	Frank Keogh	William G. Yanke	William G. Yanke	5 F	1:02.00	$540
1909	Uncas Chief	2	Eddie Dugan	Samuel T. Booker	Thomas L. Watt	6 F	1:14.00	$420
1908	Statesman	2	Dalton McCarthy	Frank E. Gardner	Frank E. Gardner	6 F	1:16.40	$3,240
1907	Chapultepec	2	Joe Notter	Fred Burlew	Fred Burlew	6 F	1:13.20	$3,820
1906	Ethon	2	Jack Martin	Charles A. Mulholland	George C. Bennett	6 F	1:14.80	$3,910
1905	Bill Phillips	2	Arthur Redfern	Thomas J. Healey	Richard T. Wilson Jr.	6 F	1:14.40	$3,435
1904	Red Friar	2	Jack Martin	Richard O. Miller	Philip J. Dwyer	6 F	1:13.60	$3,420
1903	Gallant	2	Andrew Minder	Thomas E. Mannix	Thomas E. Mannix & Co.	6 F	1:13.20	$3,520
1902	Hurst Park	2	Willie Shaw	James G. Rowe Sr.	James R. & Foxhall P. Keene	6 F	1:13.60	$3,545
1901	Chilton	2	Willie Shaw	William C. Smith	George E. Smith	6 F	1:14.00	$675
1900	The Parader	2	Patrick A. McCue	Thomas J. Healey	Richard T. Wilson Jr.	53/4 F	1:10.00	$1,730
1899	Mischievous	2	Willie Martin	Thomas Welsh	Charles Fleischman's Sons	53/4 F	1:10.60	$1,790
1898	Ethelbert	2	Tod Sloan	Lewis Elmore	James Galway	53/4 F	1:11.00	$1,780
1897	Firearm	2	Fred Taral	John J. Hyland	August Belmont Jr.	53/4 F	1:11.00	$1,450
1896	Scottish Chieftain	2	Fred Taral	Matthew Byrnes	Marcus Daly	53/4 F	1:13.40	$1,425
1895	Hazlet	2	Henry Griffin	John J. Hyland	David Gideon & John Daly	53/4 F	1:11.20	$1,450
1894	Waltzer	2	Edward Garrison	John J. Hyland	David Gideon & John Daly	53/4 F	1:12.40	$1,950
1893	St. Maxim	2	Alonzo Clayton	Robert Tucker	Charles Fleischmann & sons	53/4 F	1:14.00	$3,145
1892	Comanche	2	Edward Garrison	Augustus Hannon	Empire Stable	53/4 F	1:12.80	$2,760
1891	Victory	2	Fred Taral	William Lakeland	William Lakeland	53/4 F	1:15.00	$3,300
1890	Strathmeath	2	Marty Bergen	Green B. Morris	Green B. Morris	53/4 F	1:09.40	$2,940
1889	Blackburn	2	Edward Garrison	Frank McCabe	Dwyer Brothers Stable	6 F	1:15.50	$3,125
1888	Aurania	2	Jim McLaughlin	Frank McCabe	Dwyer Brothers Stable	6 F	1:16.00	$3,325
1887	Satisfaction	2	William J. Fitzpatrick	R. Wyndham Walden	R. Wyndham Walden	6 F	1:18.00	$3,700
1886	Tremont	2	Jim McLaughlin	Frank McCabe	Dwyer Brothers Stable	6 F	1:16.50	$2,185
