= June Stakes =

- Class: Defunct horse race
- Location: Sheepshead Bay Race Track, Sheepshead Bay, Brooklyn, New York, United States
- Inaugurated: 1886
- Race type: Thoroughbred - Flat racing

Race information
- Distance: 5.5 furlongs
- Surface: Dirt
- Track: left-handed
- Qualification: Two-year-olds

The June Stakes was a Thoroughbred horse race for two-year-olds of either sex run annually for sixteen years from its inauguration in 1886 through 1901 at Sheepshead Bay Race Track in Sheepshead Bay, Brooklyn, New York.

The first running in 1886 was won by the Dwyer Brothers Stable colt Tremont for whom Tremont Stakes at Belmont Park was established in 1887 at the Gravesend Race Track as a race for two-year-olds. That race is still current in 2025 and run at Belmont Park.

Dropped from the 1902 schedule, the June 28, 1901 June Stakes would turn out to be the final edition. In a field of only four starters, jockey Tommy Burns, a future United States and Canadian Hall of Fame inductee, rode the John Madden owned and trained colt Peninsula to victory.

== Distances ==
5.5 F: 1900, 1901
5.75 F: 1890
6 F: 1886–1889

== Records ==
Speed record:

- at 5.5 furlongs : 1:07.00 – Peninsula (1901)
- at 5.75 furlongs : 1:12.00 – Rusher (1898)
- at 6 furlongs : 1:10.80 – La Tosca (1890), Hazlet (1895)

Most wins by a jockey:

- 4 - Fred Taral (1891, 1892, 1896, 1899)

Most wins by a trainer:

- 2 - James G. Rowe Sr. (1890, 1897)

Most wins by an owner:

- No owner won this race more than once.

== Winners ==
Year	Winner	Jockey	Trainer	Owner	Dist. (Miles)	Time
1901	Peninsula	Tommy Burns	John E. Madden	John E. Madden	5.5 F	1:07.00
1900	Holstein	Nash Turner	John W. Rogers	William C. Whitney	5.5 F	1:09.00
1899	Prestidigitator	Nash Turner	William C. Smith	George E. Smith	6 F	1:17.00
1898	Rusher	Fred Taral	Michael J. Daly	William C. Daly	5.75 F	1:12.00
1897	Blarney Stone	Tod Sloan	James G. Rowe Sr.	Lewis S. Thompson	5.75 F	1:12.20
1896	Scottish Chieftain	Fred Taral	Matthew Byrnes	Marcus Daly	6 F	1:12.40
1895	Hazlet	Henry Griffin	John J. Hyland	David Gideon & John Daly	6 F	1:10.80
1894	The Bluffer	Samuel Doggett	Walter C. Rollins	Oneck Stable	6 F	1:12.20
1893	Dobbins	John Lamley	Hardy Campbell Jr.	Richard Croker	6 F	1:14.00
1892	Mendicant	Fred Taral	S. W. "Doc" Streett	S. W. "Doc" Streett	6 F	1:14.60
1891	Victory	Fred Taral	William Lakeland	William Lakeland	6 F	1:13.80
1890	La Tosca	Anthony Hamilton	James G. Rowe Sr.	August Belmont Sr.	5.75 F	1:10.80
1889	Cayuga	Fred Littlefield	R. Wyndham Walden	John A. & Alfred H. Morris	6 F	1:16.80
1888	Diablo	Edward H. Garrison	James H. Dumas	Castle Stable (Mr. A. Kraemer)	6 F	1:17.00
1887	Torchlight	P. Godfrey	Andrew Thompson	William Lawrence Scott	6 F	1:16.50
1886	Tremont	Jim McLaughlin	Frank McCabe	Dwyer Brothers Stable	6 F	1:18.25
