= 1895 Preakness Stakes =

20th running of the Preakness Stakes

20th Preakness Stakes
- Preakness Stakes
- Location: Gravesend Race Track, Coney Island, New York; United States
- Date: May 25, 1895
- Distance: 1 1/16 mi (8.5 furlongs; 1,700 m)
- Winning horse: Belmar
- Winning time: 1:50.50
- Jockey: Fred Taral
- Trainer: Edward Feakes
- Owner: Preakness Stables
- Conditions: Fast
- Surface: Dirt

The 1895 Preakness Stakes was the 20th running of the $1,000 added Preakness Stakes, a horse race for three-year-old Thoroughbreds run on May 25, 1895, at Gravesend Race Track, in Coney Island, New York. Ridden by Fred Taral, Belmar won the mile and a sixteen race by one length over runner-up April Fool. The race was run on a track rated fast in a final time of 1:50 1/2.

Bred by James Galway at his Preakness Stud in Passaic County, New Jersey, he raced under the nom de course Preakness Stables.

In 1895, the Kentucky Derby was run on May 6, 1895, and the Preakness Stakes twenty days later on May 25. When the New York Jockey Club ceased operations, the running of the Belmont Stakes was delayed until November 2 once the Westchester Racing Association took over the racetrack.

The 1919 Preakness Stakes would mark the first time the race would be recognized as the second leg of a U.S. Triple Crown series.

== The full chart ==
Finish Position	Margin (lengths)	Post Position	Horse name	Jockey	Trainer	Owner	Post Time Odds	Purse Earnings
1st	0		Belmar	Fred Taral	Edward Feakes	Preakness Stables	3-1	$1,850
2nd	1		April Fool	Henry Griffin			8-1	$
3rd			Sue Kittie	William Midgley Jr.			15-1	$
4th			Mirage	William Penn			6-1	$
5th			Kennel	John Lamley			1-1	$
6th			Sun Up	Lester Reiff			15-1	$
6th			Bombazette	Samuel Doggett			8-1	$

- Winning Breeder: Preakness Stud; (NJ)
