= Skeets Martin =

American jockey

John Henry "Skeets" Martin
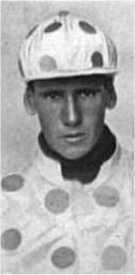
- circa 1900

Personal information
- Born: January 25, 1875 Titusville, Pennsylvania, United States
- Died: March 1944 (aged 69) Realta, Switzerland
- Occupation: Jockey

Horse racing career
- Sport: Horse racing
- Career wins: 1257: 269-242-181 (US); 138: 48-?-? (1899)

Major racing wins
- United States wins: First Special Stakes (1896); Brooklyn Handicap (1897); Dolphin Stakes (1897); Golden Rod Stakes (1897); Montgomery Handicap (1899); Brighton Derby (1906) United Kingdom wins: September Stakes (1899); Northumberland Plate (1900); Princess of Wales's Stakes (1902); Lincolnshire Handicap (1908); Coronation Cup (1910); King's Stand Stakes (1911, 1913) British Classic Race wins: Epsom Derby (1902); 2,000 Guineas (1903)

Significant horses
- Ard Patrick; Hornet's Beauty; Rock Sand; Sir Martin; Volodyovski
- Updated on February 16, 2010

John Henry Martin (1875–1944), commonly referred to as "Skeets" Martin, was an American jockey who achieved many racing wins in the United States and the United Kingdom during the late nineteenth and early twentieth century. His most notable race wins were the 1902 Epsom Derby on Ard Patrick and the 1903 2,000 Guineas on Rock Sand. Martin's technique was often at odds with racing authority rules, his license being suspended several times, and his early career was marred by allegations of cheating and underhanded gambling practices.

== Early life and U.S. racing career ==
John Henry Martin was born on January 25, 1875, in Titusville, Pennsylvania. His family relocated to Santa Clara, California, in the late 1880s and young Martin began an apprenticeship at the local racetrack when he was 15.

He was first an exercise rider for Mr. Appleby and was then employed by D. Smith. His first race win was in 1896 aboard the 100:1 long shot La Mascota owned by John G. Follansbee. Weighing only 80 lbs and standing at barely five feet tall, Martin soon acquired the nickname of "Skeets" because he looked like a tiny mosquito while riding a large Thoroughbred. In 1897, he won the Brooklyn Handicap on Howard Man while racing for George E. Smith, the notorious gambler called "Pittsburgh Phil." Smith also employed Tod Sloan, and the two were often pitted against each other on Smith's mounts. Pittsburgh Phil considered Sloan to be the better of his two jockeys and would often put Martin on his less successful horses. In late 1897, Martin was widely criticized in the Eastern horse racing circuit for lackluster riding performances and failing to meet contractual obligations for many of his clients, including failing to show up on a day when he had committed to ride six horses.

These slights cost him dearly and he was not contracted for much of the 1898 season by any of the major Thoroughbred owners. In 1899, Martin was contracted to ride for John Daly and the Dwyer Brothers, notably securing second place on Half-Time in a rousing nose-to-nose finish with Jean Bereaud at the Belmont Stakes. But despite his successes, Martin was dropped from Daly's employ in May 1899 due to a pervasive rumor that he had thrown a race that would have won Daly $15,000. By 1899, Martin (at the age of 23) had won 269 out of 1257 mounts, with 242 seconds and 181 thirds in his short US career.

While the allegations of cheating effectively ended his U.S. career, there was ample opportunity for success abroad as many American horsemen were expanding their racing interests overseas and British horsemen were in need of unconventional jockeys. He traveled to the UK in early 1899 on the advice of his friend and fellow jockey, Tod Sloan.

== Career in the United Kingdom ==
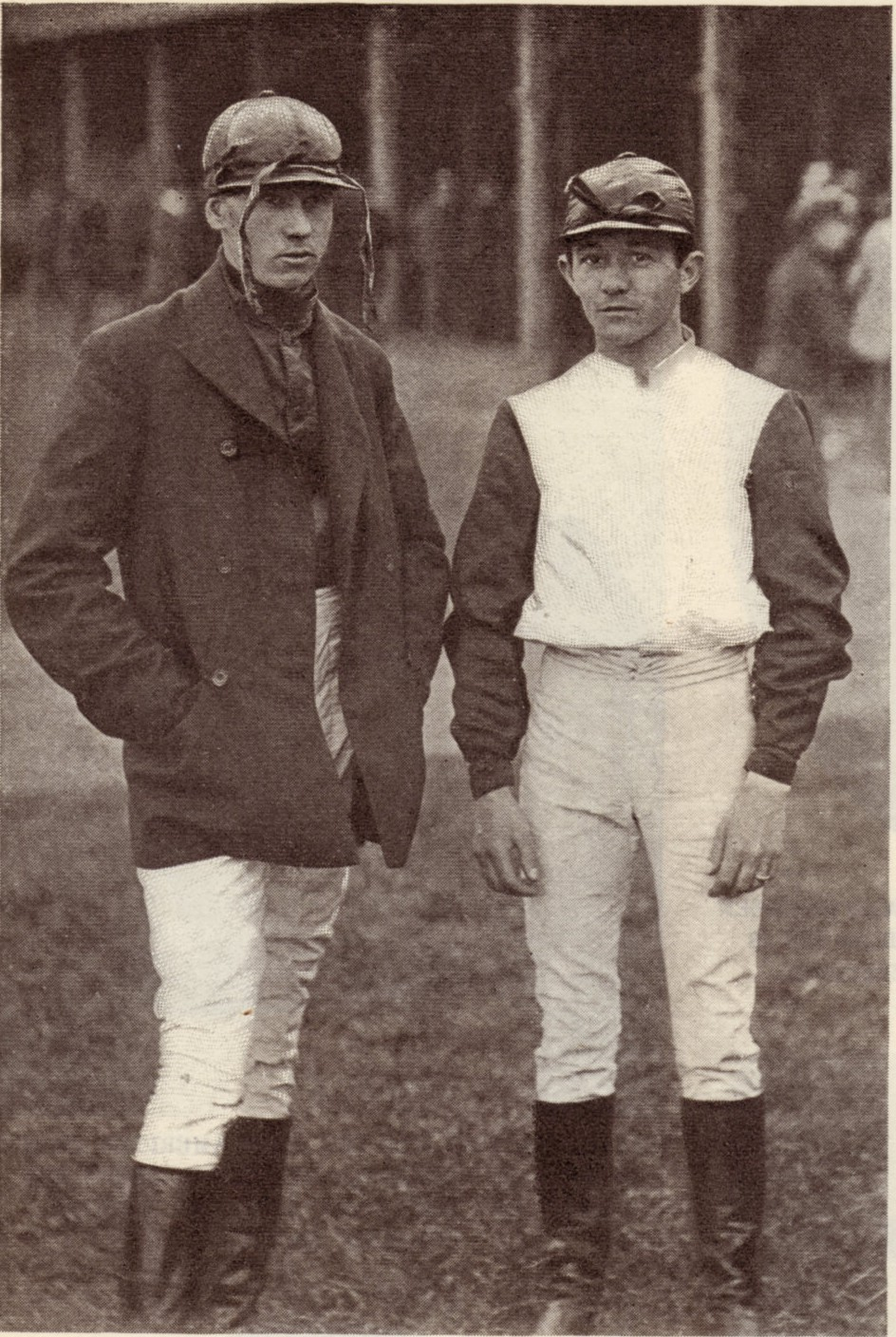
Skeets Martin (left) and Tod Sloan at Morris Park Racetrack in 1899

=== First season ===
In June 1899, Martin became part of the "American invasion" of jockeys that greatly influenced and dominated British horse racing in the early twentieth century. Together with Danny Maher, Tod Sloan, Lester Reiff and John Reiff, Martin garnered many racing wins and dazzled the British public with his aggressive racing tactics and forward-seated posture. While colloquially known as "Skeets" in the United States, he did not race under that name in Britain, opting instead for the more prosaic "J.H. Martin". His first race win occurred in August 1899 at the Rottingdean Plate on Lord William Beresford's horse Blacksmith. Other racing wins included the Doncaster Stakes, Maiden Plate and September Stakes. In his first season abroad, Martin won 48 out of 138 mounts and was considerably more well-thought of than Tod Sloan, who won more races but was often perceived as arrogant. Sloan and Martin, in the company of bicyclist and future racecar driver, Eddie Bald, returned to the United States in December 1899 due to the curtailing of turf events at the outbreak of the Second Boer War. Both jockeys returned to the UK for the start of the 1900 season in March.

=== 1900-1902 ===
Returning for the 1900 season, Martin won the Brocklesby Stakes and Doddington Plate in March, but his aggressive riding style often led to trouble. He was suspended by the Jockey Club for foul riding from May to June due to his being disqualified in the Spring Two-Year-Old Plate at Kempton Park. He followed this suspension with wins at the Triennial Stakes, Northumberland Plate, Wilton Plate, Autumn Breeder's Foal Plate and Stainsby Selling Plate. The Jockey Club refused to renew Martin's license for the 1901 season due to his continued disregard for racing etiquette and rough riding style. Tod Sloan's license was also permanently revoked, ending his racing career. Consequently, Martin obtained a license for racing in Germany during the 1901 season, winning the Spring Handicap at Cologne in April and finishing second in the Eclipse Stakes under a foreign license. His UK license was reinstated in 1902. In June 1902, Martin rode J. Gubbins' brown colt Ard Patrick in the Derby Stakes, or Epsom Derby, and won against a field of 16 other horses and three other American jockeys. He finished the 1902 season with a second-place finish on Volodyovski at the Coronation Cup and won the Princess of Wales's Stakes on Veles. He shattered his collarbone in August when his mount, Argovian, fell at the Coatham Handicap Plate, grounding him for the rest of the season.

=== 1903-1910 ===
Martin returned in 1903 to win the 2,000 Guineas with Rock Sand and had a third-place finish at the Doncaster Cup on St. Emilion. Martin was again suspended by the Jockey Club in October 1903 for a period of eight months after starting too early in the Hopeful Stakes. His only notable placing in 1904 was a third-place finish on William Rufus in the Jockey Club Stakes and he did not gain any significant wins in 1905. In 1906, Martin won the Brighton Derby in the United States and was third in the Epsom Derby on Troutbeck and at the Eclipse Stakes with Wombwell. Martin won the Lincolnshire Handicap in 1908. He raced for the stable of Harry Payne Whitney and Louis Winans in 1909 and was Sir Martin's jockey when the colt fell on Tattenham Corner at the Epsom Derby, throwing and injuring Martin. He again rode Sir Martin in the 1909 Cambridgeshire Handicap where the colt lost to Christmas Daisy and Mustapha, but Martin did win the Coronation Cup on Sir Martin in 1910.

=== Later career ===
Martin twice won the King's Stand Stakes with the gelding Hornet's Beauty in 1911 and 1913. At the onset of World War I in 1914, Martin and his wife Florence left their residence in Newmarket and moved to California, returning to the UK in 1916. Martin was the second leading jockey in Britain in 1917, riding 32 winners. He retired from racing in the early 1920s.

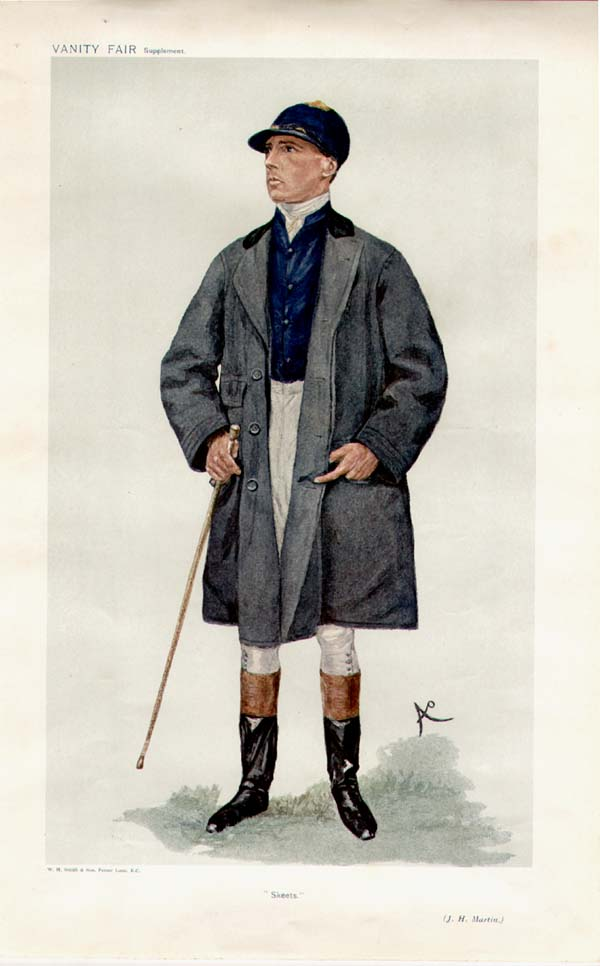
1907 Vanity Fair caricature of Martin by Roland L'Estrange (a.k.a. Ao)

== Retirement and death ==
Martin kept residences in Newmarket, California and St. Moritz, Switzerland. He was an active participant in winter sports in Switzerland, notably tobogganing, both during and after his racing career. He pioneered the face-forward style of tobogganing commonly used today and participated in winter horse racing in St. Moritz. Martin fell on hard times during his retirement in the late 1930s and 40s, mostly resulting from bad real estate investments. Collections were taken in his name by friends in the United States and Europe under the name "Skeets Fund", but the money could not be transferred safely during World War II. Destitute, he died in March 1944 at a nursing home in Realta, Switzerland.
