= 1876 Kentucky Derby =

Horse race

2nd Kentucky Derby
- Kentucky Derby
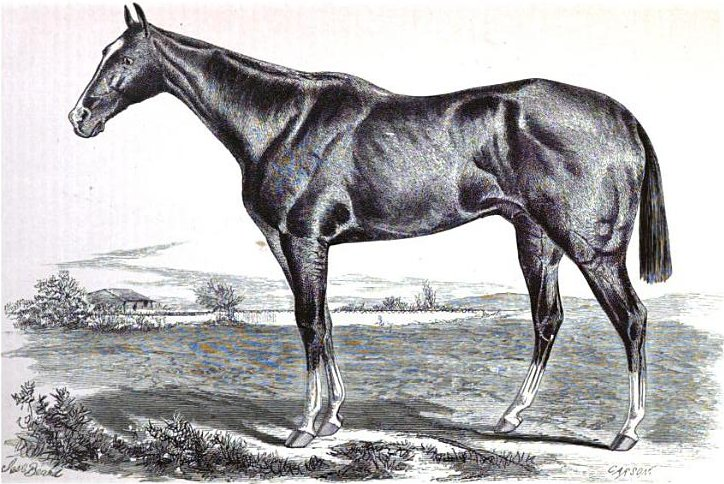
- 1876 Kentucky Derby winner Vagrant in an 1877 drawing by T.J. Scott
- Location: Churchill Downs
- Date: May 15, 1876
- Winning horse: Vagrant
- Jockey: Bobby Swim
- Trainer: James Williams
- Owner: William Backhouse Astor Jr.
- Surface: Dirt

The 1876 Kentucky Derby was the 2nd running of that annually recurring race. It took place on May 15, 1876, on the Louisville Jockey Club grounds. Vagrant, the winning horse, won carrying only 97 pounds.

== Full results ==
Finished	Post	Horse	Jockey	Trainer	Owner	Time / behind
1st	4	Vagrant	Robert Swim	James Williams	William Backhouse Astor Jr.	2:38.25
2nd		Creedmore	D. Williams		Williams & Owings	
3rd		Harry Hill	J. Miller		John Funk	
4th		Parole	P. Sparling		Pierre Lorillard IV	
5th		Germantown	W. Graham		Frank B. Harper	
6th		Lizzie Stone	W. James		Frank B. Harper	
7th		Marie Michon	Stradford		J. A. Grinstead	
8th		Bombay	William Walker		Daniel Swigert	
9th		Red Coat	Lloyd Hughes		Green Clay	
10th		Leamingtonian	Raleigh Colston Sr.		H. F. Vissman	
11th		Bullion	M. Kelso		A. Keene Richards	

== Payout ==
The winner received a purse of $2,950. The second-place finisher received $200.
