= Edwards S. Sanford =

American businessman and soldier

Brevet Brigadier General Edwards S. Sanford

President of the American Telegraph Company
- In office 1861–1866
- Preceded by: Zenus Barnum
- Succeeded by: Acquired by Western Union

Personal details
- Born: Edwards Sewall Sanford; March 17, 1817 Medway, Massachusetts
- Died: September 9, 1882 (aged 65) Sharon Hill, Pennsylvania
- Spouse: Mary Downing
- Relations: Milton H. Sanford (brother)
- Children: 2
- Education: Pierce Academy; Day's Academy

Edwards Sewall Sanford (March 17, 1817 – September 9, 1882) was an American businessman and soldier.

== Early life ==
Sanford was born on March 17, 1817, in Medway, Massachusetts. He was the second son of businessman and manufacturer Sewall Sanford (1790–1831) and Edena (née Holbrook) Sanford (1786–1876). Among his siblings were Milton Holbrook Sanford, George Francis Sanford, and Edna Jane Sanford (wife of Richard Merritt Le Favor). His father made "the first cotton thread manufactured in America."

His maternal grandfather was Capt. Joseph Holbrook and Meletiah (née Fisher) Holbrook, and his paternal grandparents were Philo Sanford and Lydia (née Whiting) Sanford.

He was educated at Pierce Academy in Middleborough, Massachusetts, before attending Day's Academy in Wrentham, Massachusetts.

== Career ==
To improve his health, Sanford went to New Orleans, then to Vicksburg, Mississippi, where he went into business, however, he lost everything in the panic of 1837, leading him to relocate to New York City in September 1842. In New York, Sanford began working, on commission only, under William B. Dinsmore for the Adams Express Company, the predecessor of which had been founded by Alvin Adams in 1840. He prospered and, not long after, he was put in charge of the company's business in Philadelphia which he expanded greatly into Baltimore and Pittsburgh. He eventually became vice-president and served in that capacity for many years. While vice-president of Adams Express, he was among the organizers of the American Telegraph Company, of which he became president in 1861, four years after it was formed, succeeding Zenus Barnum. (Note: In 1862, the directors of the American Telegraph Company were: Samuel Morse, Amos Kendall, Zenus Barnum, Francis Morris, William M. Swain, John McKesson, Wilson G. Hunt, Hiram O. Alden, John H. Purdy, Edwards S. Sanford, Cambridge Livingston, Caleb A. Burgess, and Marshall Lefferts. The officers were: Sanford as President; Francis Morris as treasurer; Cambridge Livingston, as Counsel and Secretary.) He served as president of the company until it merged into Western Union.

At the start of the U.S. Civil War, he volunteered his expertise in telegraph communications to the Union Army and was commissioned a Colonel of the U.S. Volunteers and served as Military Supervisor of Telegraphic Messages for the Union Army. In April 1861, the lines of the American Telegraph Company "were extended from their main office, 432 Pennsylvania avenue, Washington, D.C., to the War Department, Navy Yard, Arsenal, Chainbridge, and other outlying points. There was no appropriation to meet the expenses of a government telegraph service, and for six months or more General Sanford paid all the bills, aggregating thousands of dollars, for poles, wires, instruments, salaries of operators, etc." On March 13, 1865, he was brevetted Brigadier General for "meritorious services".

In 1881, he was a founding trustee of the Metropolitan Trust Company.

== Personal life ==
Sanford was married to Mary Downing (1818–1893), a daughter of George Ryall Downing and Mary (née Riggs) Downing. Together, they were the parents of two children:

- Mary Riggs Sanford (1846–1903), who married Nathaniel William Taylor Hatch.
- Edwards Sewall Sanford Jr. (1847–1914), who later worked at Adams Express Company; he married Lilless Ferrier Martin.

Sanford died on September 9, 1882, at Sharon Hill, Pennsylvania. He was buried at Green-Wood Cemetery in Brooklyn.
