= Zephyr Stakes =

American Thoroughbred horse race

- Class: Discontinued stakes
- Location: Sheepshead Bay Race Track; Brooklyn, New York, United States
- Inaugurated: 1886–1910
- Race type: Thoroughbred – Flat racing

Race information
- Distance: Furlongs: 1886–1900: 5 3/4; 1901–1909: 5 1/2; 1910: 5
- Surface: Dirt
- Track: left-handed
- Qualification: Two-year-olds

The Zephyr Stakes was an American Thoroughbred horse race that was run from 1886 through 1910 at Sheepshead Bay Race Track in Sheepshead Bay, Brooklyn, New York. A race for two-year-olds of either sex, it was a sprint race run on dirt. During its tenure, it was run at three different distances. From inception through 1900 it was run on the track's Futurity course at 5 3/4 furlongs with a setup that did not accommodate a standard six-furlong race. (A furlong is 1/8 mi or 0.20 km.)

The 1886 inaugural Zephyr Stakes was won by Tremont. Considered one of the great two-year-old horses in the history of American racing, Tremont's thirteen race wins set a record for the most by an undefeated two-year-old trained in the United States. Going into 2019, that record still stands. He earned 1886 American Champion Two-Year-Old Colt honors.

On June 11, 1908, the Republican controlled New York Legislature under Governor Charles Evans Hughes passed the Hart–Agnew anti-betting legislation with penalties allowing for fines and up to a year in prison. The owners of Sheepshead Bay Race Track, and other racing facilities in New York State, struggled to stay in business without betting. Racetrack operators had no choice but to drastically reduce the purse money being paid out which by 1909 saw the Mermaid Stakes offering a purse that was close to one-tenth of what it had been in earlier years. Further restrictive legislation was passed by the New York Legislature in 1910 which deepened the financial crisis for track operators and led to a complete shut down of racing across the state during 1911 and 1912. When a Court ruling saw racing return in 1913 it was too late for the Sheepshead Bay horse racing facility and it never reopened.

== Records ==
Speed record:

- 5 1/2 furlongs: 1:06.40, Disadvantage (1901)
- 5 3/4 furlongs: 1:09.40, Commando (1900)

Most wins by a jockey:

- 2 – Jim McLaughlin (1886, 1887)
- 2 – Tod Sloan (1896, 1898)

Most wins by a trainer:

- 3 – Frank McCabe (1886, 1887, 1889)
- 3 – T. J. Healey (1904, 1905, 1906)

Most wins by an owner:

- 3 – Dwyer Brothers Stable (1886, 1887, 1889)
- 3 – Richard T. Wilson Jr. (1904, 1905, 1906)

== Winners ==
Year	Winner	Age	Jockey	Trainer	Owner	Dist. (Furlongs)	Time	Win US$
1910	Round The World	2	Frank Keogh	J. H. Armstrong	William G. Yanke	5 F	0:59.80	$520
1909	Reybourn	2	James Butwell	William O. Scully	H. L. Lee	5.5 F	1:07.40	$455
1908	Torbellino	2	Joe McCahey	Enoch Wishard	Adolph B. Spreckels	5.5 F	1:07.00	$3,690
1907	Lady Winifred	2	Guy Garner	James H. McCreery	Frederick Johnson	5.5 F	1:07.20	$4,310
1906	Red River	2	Walter Miller	T. J. Healey	Richard T. Wilson Jr.	5.5 F	1:06.80	$4,470
1905	Gallavant	2	Arthur Redfern	T. J. Healey	Richard T. Wilson Jr.	5.5 F	1:08.00	$3,900
1904	Gamara	2	Gene Hildebrand	T. J. Healey	Richard T. Wilson Jr.	5.5 F	1:08.60	$3,735
1903	Race King	2	Frank O'Neill	Jim McLaughlin	Orville L. Richards	5.5 F	1:09.20	$3,900
1902	Golden Maxim	2	Winfield O'Connor	James J. McLaughlin	J. P. Kramer	5.5 F	1:08.40	$3,940
1901	Disadvantage	2	Willie Shaw	Arthur Carter	J. W. Smythe	5.5 F	1:06.40	$700
1900	Commando	2	Henry Spencer	James G. Rowe Sr.	James R. Keene	5.75 F	1:09.40	$1,800
1899	Killashandra	2	Patrick A. McCue	Sam Hildreth	Sydney Paget	5.75 F	1:11.40	$1,890
1898	Sir Hubert	2	Tod Sloan	Thomas Welsh	C. Fleischmann's Sons	5.75 F	1:11.20	$1,970
1897	Mont d'Or †	2	Joseph Scherrer	William Hayward Sr.	Sensation Stable (S. Deimel & H. S. Crossman)	5.75 F	1:11.00	$1,450
1896	Divide	2	Tod Sloan	William H. Karrick	Kensico Stable (J. P. Kramer & A. L. Aste)	5.75 F	1:13.20	$1,430
1895	Applegate	2	John J. McCafferty	John J. McCafferty	John J. McCafferty	5.75 F	1:11.40	$1,450
1894	Waltzer	2	Henry Griffin	John J. Hyland	David Gideon & John Daly	5.75 F	1:11.80	$1,950
1893	Dobbins	2	Willie Simms	Hardy Campbell Jr.	Richard Croker	5.75 F	1:12.00	$3,430
1892	Lovelace	2	Fred Taral	John Hunter	John Hunter	5.75 F	1:14.60	$3,100
1891	Nomad	2	Edward H. Garrison	Albert Cooper	Rosemeade Stable (Lee J. Rose)	5.75 F	1:15.00	$3,490
1890	Bolero	2	Marty Bergen	Charles Leighton	William Lawrence Scott	5.75 F	1:10.00	$3,340
1889	Blackburn	2	George Taylor	Frank McCabe	Dwyer Brothers Stable	5.75 F	1:15.50	$3,375
1888	Holiday	2	Robert Williams	R. Wyndham Walden	R. Wyndham Walden	5.75 F	1:15.00	$3,855
1887	King Fish	2	Jim McLaughlin	Frank McCabe	Dwyer Brothers Stable	5.75 F	1:15.00	$3,710
1886	Tremont	2	Jim McLaughlin	Frank McCabe	Dwyer Brothers Stable	5.75 F	1:17.25	$2,075

- † In the 1897 race, Blueaway finished first but was disqualified for improper weight.
