= Preakness Stud =

Thoroughbred racing and breeding operation

Coordinates: 40.92972°N 74.23077°W

Preakness Stud was the Thoroughbred horse racing and breeding operation established by Medway, Massachusetts businessman Milton H. Sanford in the Preakness section of Wayne, New Jersey at what today is the corner of Valley Road and Preakness Avenue.

Milton Sanford named one of his horses Preakness who won the first running of the Dinner Party Stakes and for whom the Preakness Stakes is named.

== Kentucky stud farm ==
Milton Sanford expanded his breeding operation to the Bluegrass region of Kentucky with the acquisition of the 544-acre (2.20 km^{2}) North Elkborn Stock Farm in Lexington which he renamed the Preakness Stud. One of his stallions at stud in Kentucky was Virgil, who sired Kentucky Derby winners Hindoo, Ben Ali and Vagrant, plus Preakness Stakes winner, Vanguard, and the champion 2-year-old colt, Tremont. In 1881, the sixty-eight-year-old Milton Sanford sold the Kentucky Preakness stud and its fifty-nine horses to Daniel Swigert who renamed it Elmendorf Farm.

== James Galway ==
Preakness Stud was purchased by James Galway in 1881. A prominent businessman and a member of the Board of Stewards of The Jockey Club, he raced under the nom de course Preakness Stables. In 1890, he won the Preakness Stakes with Montague trained by Edward Feakes. Galway worked to improve the Stud's breeding operation that would produce the 1895 Preakness and Belmont Stakes winner, Belmar.
