= Pittsburgh Phil =

"Pittsburg(h) Phil" may refer to:

- George E. Smith (gambler) (1862–1905), American handicapper and Thoroughbred racing enthusiast
- Harry Strauss (1909–1941), 1930s contract killer
