= Americus, Missouri =

Unincorporated community in Missouri, U.S.

Coordinates: 38°46′49″N 91°33′51″W

Americus is an unincorporated community in Montgomery County, in the U.S. state of Missouri.

== History ==
A post office called Americus was established in 1867, and remained in operation until 1959. The community was named after Amerigo Vespucci, an explorer and cartographer.

== Notable people ==
Lester Reiff, a racing jockey, was born in Americus in 1877.

John Reiff, a racing jockey and younger brother of Lester Reiff, was born in Americus in 1885. He was inducted into the US Racing Hall of Fame in 1956.
