= Tremont (horse) =

American Thoroughbred racehorse

- Sire: Virgil
- Dam: Ann Fief
- Damsire: Alarm
- Sex: Stallion
- Foaled: 1884
- Country: United States
- Colour: Black
- Breeder: Daniel Swigert
- Owner: Dwyer Brothers Stable
- Trainer: Frank McCabe
- Record: 13: 13-0-0
- Earnings: $39,135

Major wins
- Juvenile Stakes (1886); Sequence Stakes (1886); Foam Stakes (1886); Surf Stakes (1886); Zephyr Stakes (1886); Paddock Stakes (1886); Spring Stakes (1886); June Stakes (1886); Great Post Stakes (1886); Good Bye Stakes (1886); Atlantic Stakes (1886); Tyro Stakes (1886); Junior Champion Stakes (1886)

Awards
- American Champion Two-Year-Old Colt (1886)

Honours
- Tremont Stakes at Belmont Park
- Last updated on June 2, 2010

Tremont (1884–1899) was an American Thoroughbred racehorse who, according to the New York Racing Association, was acclaimed by 19th-century Thoroughbred horse racing historians as the best two-year-old ever bred in the United States. He was undefeated in thirteen starts at age two, but never raced again.

== Background ==
Bred by Daniel Swigert at his Elmendorf Farm in Fayette County, Kentucky, Tremont was purchased by the Dwyer Brothers in 1885 at the Elmendorf annual yearling sale. Tremont was sired by Virgil who also sired the 1876 Kentucky Derby winner Vagrant as well as U.S. Racing Hall of Fame inductee, Hindoo. He was trained by future Hall of Fame member Frank McCabe.

== Racing career ==
In 1886, Tremont set a record for the most wins by a two-year-old trained in the United States that still stands. That year he went undefeated in his thirteen starts while setting an earnings record for his age group. The colt dominated his opponents, winning by an average of almost six lengths. Owned by the Dwyer Brothers Stable, who were notorious for over-racing their horses, all thirteen of Tremont's races came within a ten-week period.

Tremont made his debut in the Juvenile Stakes at Jerome Park on May 29, 1886, in a field of fourteen. In the absence of starting gates, the horses milled around the starting area for nearly an hour, during which time one colt was injured and had to be scratched. When the field was finally released, Tremont got a running start and went to the front. He led by three lengths at the top of the stretch, then opened a lead of six lengths when briefly given his head by jockey Jim McLaughlin.

Over the next two months, Tremont continued to dominate the juvenile stakes races in New York and New Jersey. On June 5, he won the Sequence Stakes at Jerome Park on the same day as stablemate Inspector B took the Belmont Stakes – at the time, the two races were considered equally newsworthy. On June 10, he took the Foam Stakes at Sheepshead Bay by six lengths in wire-to-wire fashion. Just two days later, he overcame a poor start to win the Surf Stakes by three-quarters of a length while carrying a seven-pound penalty. Entering his third race in a week, Tremont then won the Zephyr Stakes on June 15. He then raced back on June 17 to take the Paddock Stakes.

After a relatively long break of five days, Tremont returned to take the Spring Stakes on June 22. Two days later, he was back to win the June Stakes by eight lengths on a day where McLaughlin won four races. On June 26, the Dwyers won three races at Sheepshead Bay, including Tremont's six-length victory in the Great Post Stakes. The Dwyers were less fortunate on the closing day of the Sheepshead Bay meet, but still won the Good Bye Stakes with Tremont.

The stable then relocated to Monmouth Park where, in what was possibly a warning of things to come, the Dwyers elected to run future star Hanover instead of Tremont in the Hopeful Stakes on July 3. Given an extra week's rest, Tremont returned on July 10 to take the Atlantic Stakes by ten lengths. On July 15, he followed up to win the Tyro Stakes by six lengths over a muddy track.

Tremont's thirteenth consecutive victory came on August 7 in the Junior Champion Stakes, run at a distance of six furlongs at Monmouth Park in a driving rainstorm. Many horses scratched due to the weather, leaving only Kingston and the Julietta colt to contest the race. Tremont trailed behind a fast early pace set by the other two, then swept to the lead in the final quarter and pulled away to win in a "common canter" by six lengths. The reporter for The New York Times wrote, "the skeptics must be convinced that he (Tremont) is the greatest 2-year-old ever foaled in this country."

Tremont was scheduled to make his next start in the August Stakes on August 10, in which he was assigned a 12-pound penalty for a total weight of 127 pounds. The Dwyers decided not to enter the colt and instead started the filly Louise, who finished second. Without further explanation at the time, Tremont's two-year-old campaign was over.

Tremont was expected to return to racing at age three but was unable to do so due to unspecified "trouble with his feet". Although the Dwyers long held out hope for his recovery, they finally arranged for his sale in September 1887 for retirement to stud.

== Stud record ==
Retired to stud duty, Tremont was a moderately successful sire, known for transmitting his speed. Of eleven runners from his first crop, nine were winners. His best offspring was considered to be Dagonet, who finished third in the Futurity Stakes, then the most important race for two-year-olds. Tremont was euthanized at Belle Meade Stud in March 1899 after an accident in which he fractured a hip.

== Honors ==
Tremont was retroactively recognized as the American Champion Two-Year-Old of 1886. The Dwyer Brothers owned Gravesend Race Track and on its opening in 1887 created the Tremont Stakes in his honor. Today, the race is run at Belmont Park.

== Pedigree ==
Pedigree of Tremont, black colt, 1884
Sire Virgil	Vandal	Glencoe	Sultan
Sire Virgil	Vandal	Glencoe	Trampoline
Sire Virgil	Vandal	Tranby Mare	Tranby
Sire Virgil	Vandal	Tranby Mare	Lucilla
Sire Virgil	Hymenia	Yorkshire	St Nicholas
Sire Virgil	Hymenia	Yorkshire	Miss Rose
Sire Virgil	Hymenia	Little Peggy	Cripple
Sire Virgil	Hymenia	Little Peggy	Peggy Stewart
Dam Ann Fief	Alarm	Eclipse	Orlando
Dam Ann Fief	Alarm	Eclipse	Gaze
Dam Ann Fief	Alarm	Maud	Stockwell
Dam Ann Fief	Alarm	Maud	Countess of Albermarle
Dam Ann Fief	Kate Walker	Embrys Lexington	Lexington
Dam Ann Fief	Kate Walker	Embrys Lexington	Bellamira
Dam Ann Fief	Kate Walker	Carrie D	Don Juan
Dam Ann Fief	Kate Walker	Carrie D	Romance (family: A33)

== See also ==
- List of leading Thoroughbred racehorses
