= Virgil (racehorse) =

American-bred Thoroughbred racehorse

- Sire: Vandal
- Grandsire: Glencoe
- Dam: Hymenia
- Damsire: Yorkshire
- Sex: Stallion
- Foaled: 1864
- Country: United States
- Colour: Brown
- Breeder: Hyman C. Gratz
- Owner: 1. Quindaro Stud; 2. Daniel Swigert; 3. Col. R.W. Simmons; 4. Milton H. Sanford
- Record: 8: 6-?-?

Awards
- Leading sire in North America (1885)
- Last updated on March 26, 2021

Virgil (1864–1886) was an American thoroughbred racehorse that was bred in Kentucky by Hyman C. Gratz. He was a brown to dark bay stallion, was approximately 16 hands high and had a prominent white star on his forehead.^{[2]} His sire, Vandal, was the second leading sire of the time, behind the great Lexington. Virgil was a direct descendant of the thoroughbred foundation sire Herod and was the leading sire in the United States in 1885.

Virgil was trained as a flat-racer, buggy racer and jumper. He had a total of 8 starts on the flat racing circuit, netting 6 wins. Virgil tended to run his best in races less than 1½ miles. In 1869, Virgil was bought by R.W. Simmons, who trained him for steeple chasing.

After his racing and jumping career, he was briefly contracted as a logging horse, which took its toll on his joints and appearance.^{[1]}

He was eventually bought in the 1870s by Milton Sanford. His stud career at Sanford's Elmendorf Farm was started by accident when Virgil was allowed to stand in for Sanford's regular stallion, Glenelg. Sanford briefly sold Virgil to B.G. Bruce but bought him back for $2500 after Vagrant won the Kentucky Derby in 1876.^{[2]} Virgil remained at Elmendorf Stud until his death at the age of 22 in September 1886.^{[2]}

He is the sire of three Kentucky Derby winners: Vagrant (1876), Hindoo (1881) and Ben Ali (1886). He also sired other successful flat-racers Tremont, Virgilian and Carley B., winner of the 1882 Travers Stakes.

== Sire line tree ==
- Virgil
  - Vagrant
  - Vigil
  - Virginius
  - Hindoo
    - Hanover
      - Buck Massie
        - Jake
        - Buckleya
      - Halma
        - Alan-a-Dale
        - Smart Set
        - Acacia
        - Oversight
      - Hammon
      - Handsome
      - The Commoner
        - Simon D
        - Johnnie Blake
        - Doctor Boots
        - Countless
        - Parmer
        - Great Britain
      - Ben Holladay
      - Handspring
        - Major Daingerfield
        - Handout
      - Heywood
        - Palo Alto
      - Hamburg
        - Inflexible
        - Strephon
        - Dandelion
        - Battleaxe
        - Burgomaster
        - Orison
        - Pegasus
        - The Irishman
        - Baby Wolf
        - Hillside
        - Borrow
        - Buskin
        - Prince Eugene
        - Happy Go Lucky
      - Handball
      - Handsel
        - Grover Hughes
        - Colonel Livingstone
      - Sanders
      - Half Time
      - Handcuff
      - David Garrick
      - Star of Hanover
      - Withers
      - Admonition
      - Holstein
      - Abe Frank
      - Blackstock
        - Mentor
      - Kaffir
        - Kaffir Boy
      - King Hanover
        - Prince Ahmed
      - Luck and Charity
      - Serpent
      - Yankee
        - Dinna Ken
        - Yankee Gun
        - Joe Madden
        - Marse Abe
        - Naushon
        - Nonpareil
        - Penobscot
    - Jim Gore
      - Beau Gallant
      - Gorman
      - Merry Lark
    - Buddhist
    - Dungarvan
      - J H Houghton
    - Merry Monarch
    - Aryan
    - Macy
    - Benroe
    - Howland
    - Miller
    - Alard Scheck
  - Van Buren
  - Carley B
  - Vanguard
  - Isaac Murphy
  - Ben Ali
    - Arcade
  - Tremont
    - Dagonet
    - Fremont
    - Tremor

== Pedigree ==
Pedigree of Virgil
Sire Vandal 1850	Glencoe 1831	Sultan	Selim
Sire Vandal 1850	Glencoe 1831	Sultan	Bacchante
Sire Vandal 1850	Glencoe 1831	Trampoline	Tramp*
Sire Vandal 1850	Glencoe 1831	Trampoline	Web
Sire Vandal 1850	Tranby mare 1840	Tranby	Blacklock
Sire Vandal 1850	Tranby mare 1840	Tranby	Orville mare
Sire Vandal 1850	Tranby mare 1840	Lucilla	Trumpator
Sire Vandal 1850	Tranby mare 1840	Lucilla	Lucy
Dam Hymenia 1851	Yorkshire 1834	St Nicholas	Emilius
Dam Hymenia 1851	Yorkshire 1834	St Nicholas	Sea Mew
Dam Hymenia 1851	Yorkshire 1834	Miss Rose	Tramp*
Dam Hymenia 1851	Yorkshire 1834	Miss Rose	Sancho mare
Dam Hymenia 1851	Little Peggy 1853	Cripple	Medoc
Dam Hymenia 1851	Little Peggy 1853	Cripple	Grecian Princess
Dam Hymenia 1851	Little Peggy 1853	Peggy Stewart	Whip
Dam Hymenia 1851	Little Peggy 1853	Peggy Stewart	Mary Bedford

* Virgil is inbred 4S x 4D to the stallion Tramp, meaning that he appears fourth generation on the sire side of his pedigree and fourth generation on the dam side of his pedigree.
