= Robert Swim =

American jockey

Bobby Swim
Personal information
- Born: ?
- Died: 1878

Horse racing career
- Sport: Horse racing

Major racing wins
- Ladies Handicap (1871); Monmouth Oaks (1871); Saratoga Cup (1871); Dinner Party Stakes (1873); Travers Stakes (1873); Withers Stakes (1875); Belmont Stakes (1875) American Classics wins: Belmont Stakes (1868, 1875); Kentucky Derby (1876)

Significant horses
- Aristides, Calvin, General Duke, Longfellow, Vagrant, Tom Bowling

Robert "Bobby" Swim (?–1878) was an American Thoroughbred racing jockey best known for winning the 1876 Kentucky Derby and the 1868 and 1875 runnings of the Belmont Stakes, races that would make up the first and third leg of the U. S. Triple Crown series.

== Life and career ==
Bobby Swim was born to Irish parents in the east side of Louisville in about 1842 and began racing at the age of twelve years. During the Civil War he herded cattle for the U. S. government. J.H Weldon, a well-respected horse trainer, was his first teacher. He worked for John M. Clay's stable in 1867 and the next year he worked for McConnell and Harness, riding their horse, General Duke, to victory in the 1868 Belmont Stakes. In 1870 he is referred to as a "racing man" in a Memphis newspaper on the day the Spring Meeting at the Memphis Fairgrounds began. The next year he rode Longfellow to victory for John Harper in both the Monmouth Oaks and Saratoga Cup, rode Nellie Gray to win the Ladies Handicap, and rode Tom Bowling to win the Dinner Party Stakes.

The press described the confidence Major Thomas Walker Doswell's stable had in him before he won the Jockey Club Handicap on their horse, Eolus at Jerome Park on June 11, 1873. Swim won again on Tom Bowling at the Jersey Derby the following July 4. Newspapers then described his quick reflexes, adaptability, and composure in handling Tom Bowling, who was notoriously fractious, at the Jersey Derby Stakes held at Monmouth park on July 29 of that year. He again rode Tom Bowling to victory in the Travers Stakes in late July or early August and at Jerome Park on October 4. The next year he was named as the jockey at H. Price Mcgrath's stables in Lexington. He rode Aristides to first place in the 1875 Withers Stakes and rode Calvin to a second win at the Belmont Stakes. By this year he was married.

After winning the 1876 Kentucky Derby with Vagrant, Bobby Swim finished second in the 1877 running on Leonard and third in 1878 on Leveler. By that spring he was noted in the press as a celebrated jockey. He was arrested at this time for being disorderly in Cincinnati which, in those days, referred to public drunkenness. However, he was exonerated, the press noting that he had refused a $40,000 bribe to throw a race. By the middle of that year he was no longer working for McGrath, though he did enter the Lexington races that spring and ride his first winning races in a year. He was widely enough known that a newcomer to the racing world was copared to him and his opinion was quoted in the press. Late that summer he began displaying symptoms of tuberculosis. Nevertheless, he won his next-to-last race on Cammie F., winning by ten lengths on a muddy track against a Himyar, a horse that normally performed well in mud. Despite his illness, he entered a race to honor a contract, riding Cammie F. again, and finished second. Henry Owens, owner of the race horse named Leveler, paid for his burial. Swim was widely enough known that a newspaper described an animal involved in an accident as "dead as Bobby Swim."

He was regarded as a formidable, though controversial, jockey during the 1870s and 1880s. One obituary described his riding as "sharp, and always just on the edge of foul." The Tennessean quoted the UK's The Sportsman as saying that he had great natural talent. He was fast out of the gate and ran his mounts for all they were worth. But there was "nothing cunning or crafty about him" and his style was badly affected by false starts. Turf historian W. S. Vosburgh criticized Swim's aggressive style, citing incidents where "horses cut down" in races "gave color to the belief" that he was an unfair rider. In contrast, his professional integrity as an employee was highly praised. A contemporary article noted that when riding for an owner, Swim was considered 'more than honest' and utilized the full 'science of jockeydom' for his employer's benefit, adding that criticism and suspicion were common for jockeys in that era. Though he gambled away most of the money he earned, he was respected and admired by his contemporaries. Though the majority of Kentucky jockeys in this era were Black, a contemporary newspaper described him as "freckle-faced" and his death register entry identified his race as White. In 1874, despite having lost races to jockeys imported from England, the press quoted his dispute with someone who opposed hiring them.
