= Lester Reiff =

American jockey

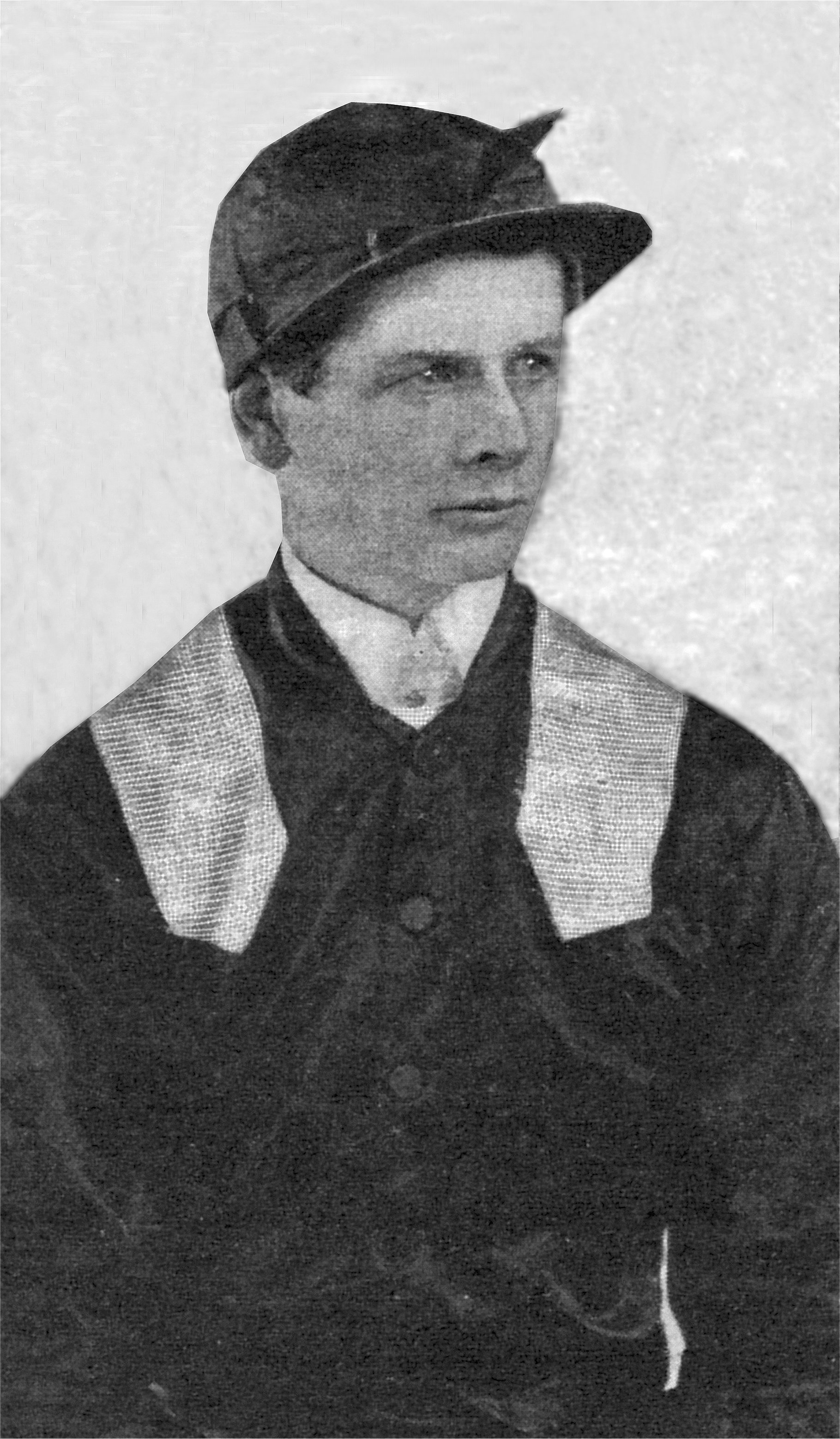
- circa 1900. From an article in Munsey's Magazine

Personal information
- Born: April 26, 1877 Americus, Missouri, US
- Died: October 10, 1948 (aged 71) Alameda County, California, US
- Resting place: Oak Hill Memorial Park; San Jose, California
- Occupations: Jockey, Real estate broker

Horse racing career
- Sport: Horse racing
- Career wins: 549: 143-?-? (UK, 1900)

Major racing wins
- Hudson Stakes (1895); Lawrence Realization Stakes (1895); Spindrift Stakes (1895) International race wins: Final Plate (1900); Champion Stakes (1900); Doncaster Cup (1900, 1901); St James's Palace Stakes (1900); Sussex Stakes (1900); Epsom Derby (1901)

Racing awards
- British flat racing Champion Jockey (1900)

Significant horses
- Volodyovski
- Updated on February 16, 2010

Lester Berchart Reiff (1877–1948) was an American jockey who achieved racing acclaim in the United Kingdom in the first decade of the twentieth century. In 1900, he was the number one jockey racing in Britain based on earnings, beating other prominent American jockeys such as Tod Sloan, Danny Maher, Skeets Martin and his younger brother, John Reiff, that were also racing in Britain at the time. The Reiff brothers were implicated in a horse doping scandal in late 1901, which led to the revocation of Lester Reiff's license and the end of his racing career.

== Early life and U.S. racing career ==
Lester B. Reiff was born on April 26, 1877, in Americus, Missouri, to John Wesley Reiff and Elizabeth Jane (née Wandel) Reiff. His brothers, John (1885–1974) and Delbert (1879–1976), were also employed in the Thoroughbred racing industry. John Reiff is a US Racing Hall of Fame inductee and Delbert Reiff was a horse trainer that ran a horse importing business from Maisons-Laffitte, France. The Reiff family moved to Findlay, Ohio, in the 1880s, and Lester became a jockey apprentice as a teenager. He raced for horse trainer Enoch Wishard in 1894 but was suspended numerous times for throwing races and was barred from horse racing in late 1894 and the early months of 1895.

== U.K. racing career ==
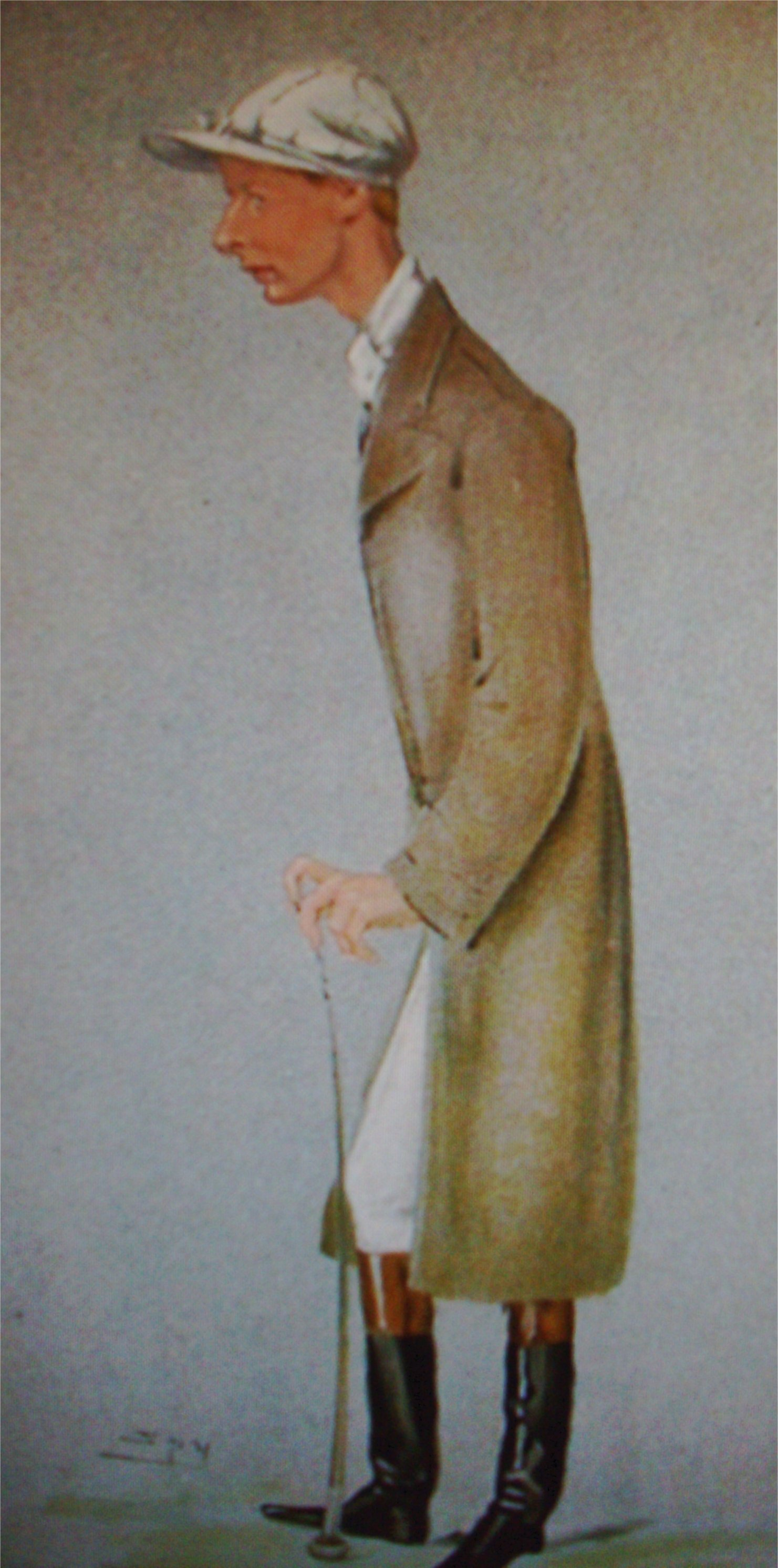
1900 Vanity Fair caricature of Lester Reiff drawn by (Spy).

Reiff traveled to the United Kingdom with Wishard in 1896 to race for the stable of Tammany Hall boss Richard Croker. Reiff was again suspended by the Jockey Club in July 1896 for interfering with another horse while running the Goodwood Cup and he returned to the United States to race in a few minor stakes races. In 1900 his UK license was reinstated and he was contracted for $15,000 to race for Croker. Lester Reiff won 143 races out of 549 mounts in 1900, heading the list of winning jockeys in Britain, and he was the first non-British jockey to accomplish this feat. In 1901, Reiff won The Derby aboard Volodyovski for American trainer John Huggins.

=== Scandal ===
In October 1901, Lester Reiff and his younger brother John were reprimanded by the Jockey Club for alleged race fixing by "pulling" or slowing the horse so it will not win. This followed an incident at Manchester Racecourse on 27 September in which Lester's horse had finished second by a head to a horse ridden by his brother. The local stewards (racecourse officials) were unsatisfied by the brothers' explanations and so referred the matter to the Jockey Club.

Lord Durham also accused the brothers of involvement in a horse doping ring along with Enoch Wishard and other American gamblers. While "doping" with performance enhancing stimulants was illegal at the time in the United States, it was still permissible in the UK in 1901 and was not outlawed until 1904. Lester Reiff's license was revoked for the 1902 season due to these incidents and he was barred or "warned off" from racing in other countries.

His license was reinstated in 1904 but unlike his brother who resumed his career with success, Lester did not pursue horse racing again.

== Retirement from racing and personal life ==
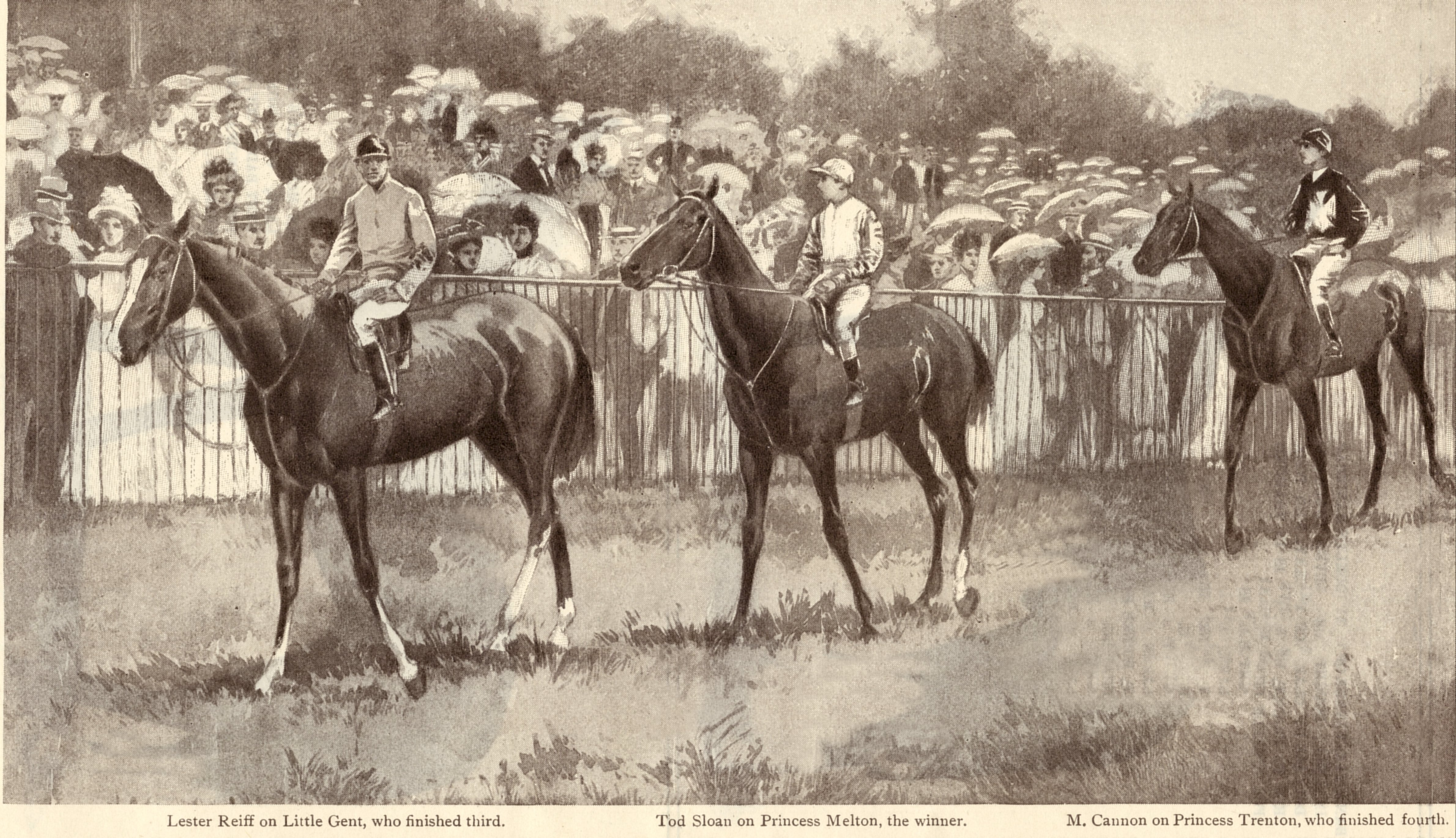
Reiff (left) on Little Gent, Tod Sloan on Princess Melton and British jockey Morny Cannon at 1900 Produce Stakes run at Newmarket.

Reiff married Frances Rowell, the daughter of California physician and horseman Harry E. Rowell, in December 1901. Reiff retired from racing in 1902 and moved to Alameda with his wife. Lester Reiff became a real-estate broker and venture capitalist, managing the property of his family and several friends until his death on October 10, 1948, in Alameda.
