= Tod Sloan (jockey) =

American jockey

James Forman "Tod" Sloan
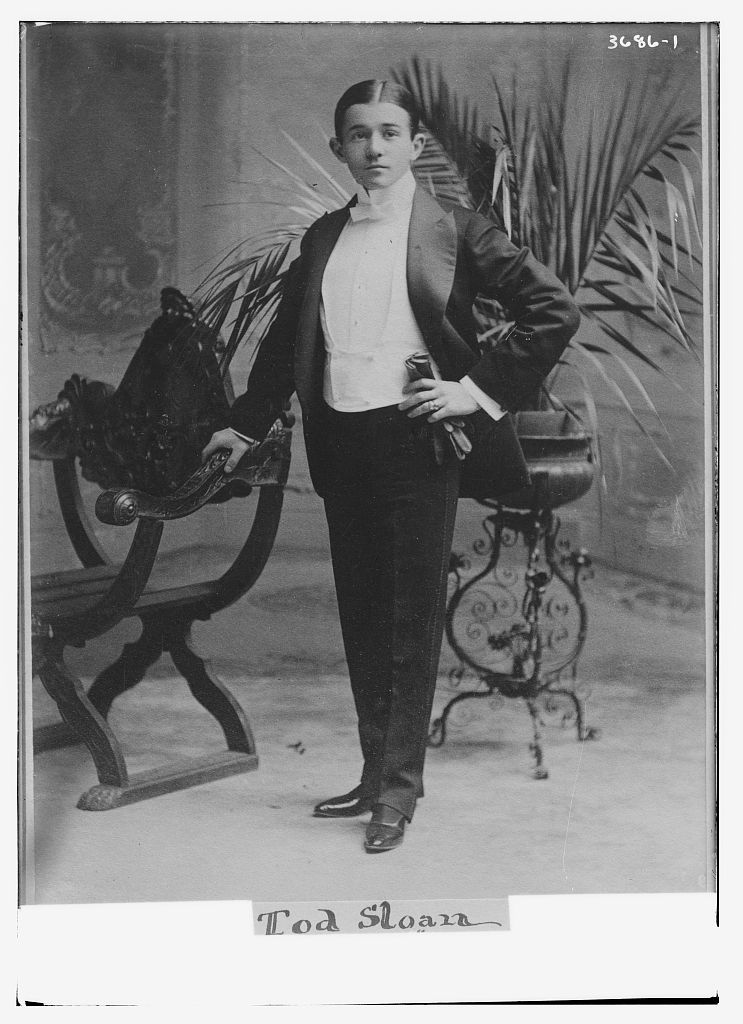

Personal information
- Born: August 10, 1874 Bunker Hill, Indiana, United States
- Died: December 21, 1933 (age 59) Los Angeles, California, United States
- Occupation: Jockey

Horse racing career
- Sport: Horse racing

Major racing wins
- Hudson Stakes (1893, 1898); Flying Handicap (1896); Foam Stakes (1896, 1898); Manhattan Handicap (1896); Test Handicap (1896); Zephyr Stakes (1896, 1898); Belles Stakes (1897); Eclipse Stakes (1897, 1898); Flatbush Stakes (1897, 1900); June Stakes (1897); Laureate Stakes (1897, 1898); Ocean Handicap (1897); Russet Stakes (1897, 1898); Double Event Stakes (part 1) (1898); Double Event Stakes (part 2) (1898); Fall Handicap (1898); Fashion Stakes (1898); Great American Stakes (1898); Great Eastern Handicap (1898); Great Trial Stakes (1898); Lawrence Realization Stakes (1898); National Stallion Stakes (1898); Pansy Stakes (1898); Spring Stakes (1898) International race wins: 1,000 Guineas (1899); Ascot Gold Cup (1900)

Honours
- United States Racing Hall of Fame (1955)

Significant horses
- Hamburg, Clifford, Sibola, Belmar, Merman,
- Updated on June 9, 2007

James Forman "Tod" Sloan (August 10, 1874 - December 21, 1933) was an American Thoroughbred horse racing jockey. He was elected to the National Museum of Racing and Hall of Fame in 1955.

== Early life and US racing career ==
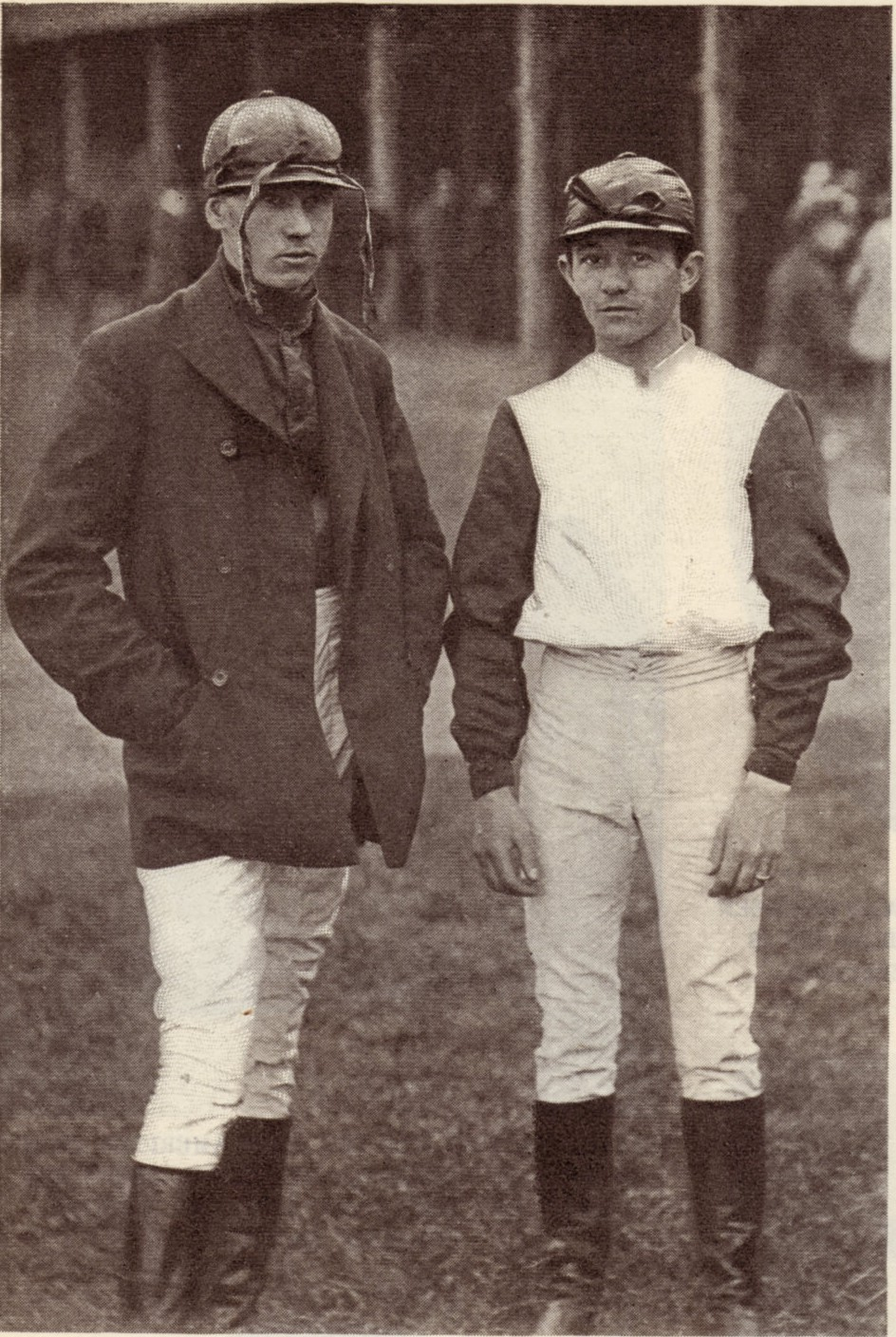
Henry "Skeets" Martin (left) and Tod Sloan in 1899 at Morris Park Racetrack.

James Forman Sloan was born in Bunker Hill, Indiana, near Kokomo, the son of a Union Army soldier. He was a tiny and frail child, and after his mother died when he was five, his father sent him to live with a nearby family. He was still a young boy when he struck out on his own, taking jobs in the nearby gas and oil fields. For a time he ended up working at a horse racing stable in St. Louis, but later in Kansas City was employed by a thoroughbred horse trainer who encouraged him to take advantage of his diminutive stature and become a jockey.

By 1886, Sloan was working at Latonia Race Track in Covington, Kentucky, where trainer Sam Hildreth gave him the opportunity to ride one of his horses. Sloan's performance was not impressive, and his horse finished in the back of the pack. However, he persisted and a few years later was riding at the Fair Grounds Race Course in New Orleans, and on March 6, 1889, scored his first win there.

In 1893, Sloan went to race in northern California where he enjoyed considerable success. In 1896 he moved to New York City after being hired by "Pittsburgh Phil", where within a short time he was the dominant rider in the Thoroughbred racing circuit on the East Coast. Despite his many career victories, Sloan said that Hamburg (1895–1915) was the only great horse he ever rode. Sloan took over as jockey for Hamburg when the horse's career was near its end after the three-year-old had been soundly defeated in the Belmont Stakes. Ridden by Sloan, the horse won the Lawrence Realization, easily defeating Kentucky Derby winner Plaudit, then scored the most impressive win of his career in the 2¼-mile American Brighton Cup.

Such were Sloan's abilities that in 1896 he won nearly 30% of all his races, increased it to 37% in 1897, and upped it to an astonishing 46% in 1898.

== UK racing career ==
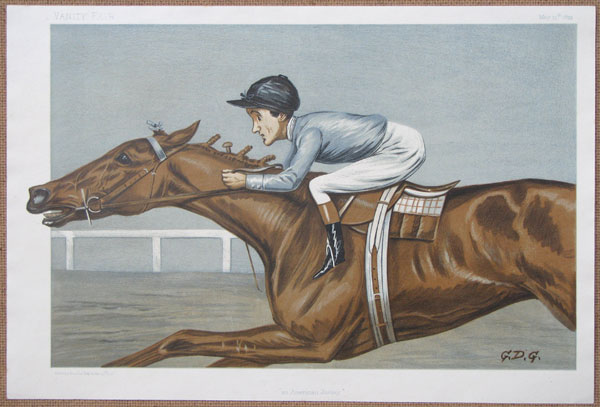
1890s Vanity Fair caricature by Godfrey Douglas Giles illustrating Sloan's distinctive riding style

Charles F. Dwyer, a close friend and son of prominent racehorse owner Mike Dwyer, was part of a syndicate that backed Sloan's mounts when he rode in England. Racing there on September 30, 1898, Sloan rode five consecutive winners at the Newmarket Racecourse. It was Sloan who popularized the forward seat style of riding, or the "monkey crouch" as the British called it, when he began riding there in 1897. Initially mocked, the style he used revolutionized the sport worldwide. (Although he did not invent it.)

Returning to England the following year he won a number of major and important races including the 1899 1,000 Guineas aboard Sibola and in 1900 the Ascot Gold Cup riding Merman for owner, Lily Langtry. The prestigious Derby was a race that Sloan always felt he would have won, had it not been for a terrible tragedy. In the 1899 race, his horse Holocauste took the early lead, and rounding Tattenham Corner Holocauste and Flying Fox, winner of the 2,000 Guineas, were racing head-to-head in front of the rest of the field. At that point in the race Sloan said he was still holding back on the horse, in preparation for a full-out drive down the straight, when his horse stopped abruptly and collapsed to the ground with a shattered pastern. Holocauste was put down while Flying Fox went on to win the race. Later that year Flying Fox won the St. Leger to become the 1899 Triple Crown Champion.

In 1900, Edward, Prince of Wales, offered Sloan the job to ride for his stable in the 1901 racing season. Sloan's success on the racetrack, combined with a flamboyant lifestyle filled with beautiful women, made him one of the first to become a major international celebrity in the sport. He hung out with the likes of Diamond Jim Brady and traveled with a personal valet and a trunk full of clothes.

Sloan's reputation was such that he was the "Yankee Doodle" in the George M. Cohan Broadway musical Little Johnny Jones and the basis for Ernest Hemingway's short story "My Old Man". Although Sloan's racing career was spectacular, it was relatively short, ending by 1901 under a cloud of suspicion that he had been betting on races in which he had competed. Advised by the British Jockey Club that they would not renew his license, he never rode for the Prince of Wales. The ban in Britain was maintained by American racing authorities, and Sloan's jockey career came to an end.

== Retirement ==
After Sloan left racing, Oscar Hammerstein arranged for him to star in a one-man show in a New York vaudeville theatre, but it did not last.

Sloan eventually went to Paris, France, where in 1911 he converted a small bistro into what became the famous Harry's New York Bar (located at 5 rue Daunou between the Avenue de l'Opéra and the Rue de la Paix). Financial problems from overspending on a lavish lifestyle forced Sloan to sell the bar and return to the U.S.

His money gone, in 1920 Sloan tried acting in motion pictures, but by then his name no longer had the star value to carry him. Married and divorced twice, Sloan died of cirrhosis in 1933, aged 59, in Los Angeles, California, and was interred in the Forest Lawn Memorial Park Cemetery in Glendale.

Ultimately, British racing historians restored Sloan's reputation, as his betting on races had been a dubious charge at best. He was posthumously inducted into the National Museum of Racing and Hall of Fame in 1955. Sloan told his life story in a book titled "Tod Sloan by Himself" that was published in 1915 of which 200 were signed by Sloan and are highly sought after. Following his death, Beryl Markham received an advance from Houghton Mifflin to write a book on Sloan, but it too was never published because of Markham's own problems.

== Personal life ==
In 1907, Sloan was married to the stage actress Julia Sanderson. He claimed at the time of the marriage that he had given up racing and gambling, but in the words of his obituary, "neither his decision nor his marriage lasted very long"; Sloan and Sanderson were divorced in 1913. In 1920, he married Elizabeth Saxon Malone, also an actress; they were divorced in 1927, with Elizabeth accusing him of "mental cruelty and habitual intemperance". He had one daughter, Ann Giroux (born 1922).

== Rhyming slang ==
The name of Tod Sloan left a mark on the English language. His name was already famous in London because he rode many winners in England where his first name was adopted into the rhyming slang used by the Cockneys of the East end of London to mean 'own' as in 'on his Jack Jones' (from Tod Sl'oan'). Hence, someone 'on his tod' is alone.
