= Scottish Chieftain (horse) =

American Thoroughbred racehorse

- Sire: Inverness
- Grandsire: Cymbal
- Dam: Miss Darebin
- Damsire: Darebin
- Sex: Stallion
- Foaled: 1894
- Country: United States
- Colour: Dark Bay
- Breeder: Marcus Daly
- Owner: Marcus Daly
- Trainer: Matt Byrnes
- Record: Not found
- Earnings: Not found

Major wins
- Spring Stakes (1896) American Classics wins: Belmont Stakes (1897)
- Last updated on May 31, 2007

Scottish Chieftain (foaled February 24, 1894) was an American Thoroughbred racehorse. He is the only horse bred in the state of Montana to ever win the Belmont Stakes, an American Classic Race.

Owned and bred by Marcus Daly, one of the wealthy Montana Copper Kings, Scottish Chieftain was trained by Matt Byrnes. When he won the 1897 Belmont Stakes he was ridden by 1896 National Champion jockey Joseph Scherrer. While information of his racing career is limited, it is reported that he also won the Spring Handicap and had a second-place finish in the Tidal Stakes at Sheepshead Bay Race Track.
