= Vagrant (horse) =

American-bred Thoroughbred racehorse

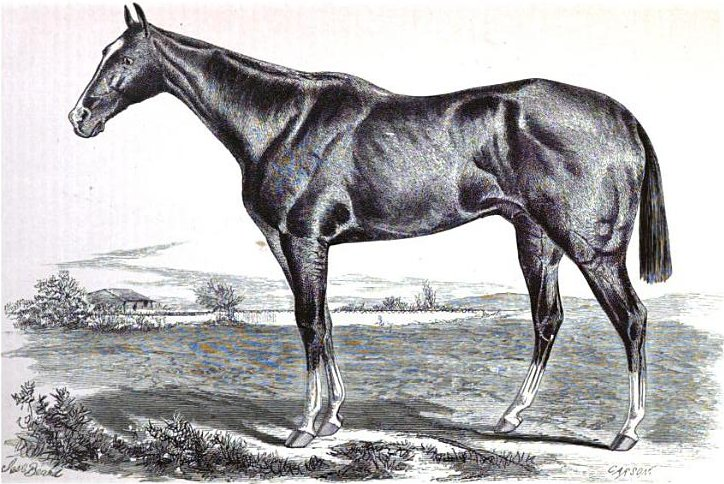
- 1877 drawing by T.J. Scott
- Sire: Virgil
- Grandsire: Vandal
- Dam: Lazy
- Damsire: Scythian (GB)
- Sex: Gelding
- Foaled: May 17, 1873
- Died: c.1890
- Country: United States
- Colour: Bay
- Breeder: Milton H. Sanford
- Owner: 1) Thomas J. Nichols; 2) William B. Astor, Jr. 3) James J. Bevins
- Trainer: A. Davis Pryor (at 3); James Williams
- Record: 88: 20-12-12
- Earnings: $13,875

Major wins
- Alexander Stakes (1875); Belle Meade Stakes (1875); Sanford Stakes (1875); Colt Stakes (1875); Colt and Filly Stakes (1875); Phoenix Hotel Stakes (1876); Grand Exposition Stakes (1876) American Classics wins: Kentucky Derby (1876)

Awards
- U.S. Champion 2-Year-Old Colt (1875); U.S. Champion 3-Year-Old Colt (1876)

Vagrant (May 17, 1873 – c.1890) was an American Thoroughbred racehorse best known for his 1876 Kentucky Derby win. He was the first of nine geldings to win the Kentucky Derby and was a white-stockinged bay colt sired by Virgil out of the mare Lazy (by Scythian (GB)). Virgil was notable for siring successful nineteenth-century race horses and stood at Milton H. Sanford's Preakness Stud in Lexington, Kentucky. Through his sire, Vagrant is related to two other early Kentucky Derby winners, Hindoo (1881) and Ben Ali (1886).

== Racing career ==
While Virgil was still a little known sire, Vagrant was sold for $250 to Thomas J. Nichols at the Preakness Stud 1874 yearling sale. A promising two-year-old, Vagrant won five of six starts in 1875, including the Belle Meade Stakes, the Alexander Stakes and the Sanford Stakes, and sharing the title of U.S. Champion 2-Year-Old Colt with Parole that year.

In 1876, Vagrant won three of his four starts, becoming U.S. Champion 3-Year-Old Colt. After he won the Phoenix Hotel Stakes, Vagrant was purchased by William Backhouse Astor, Jr. for $7,000, an impressive figure for a thoroughbred of that era.

The second Kentucky Derby was run on a fast track with a field of 11 horses. Vagrant won the Derby, with Robert Swim up, by two lengths over the betting favorite, Parole, winning a total of $2,950.

Although Vagrant won the Grand Exposition Stakes in Philadelphia later in 1876, he injured his leg in the race and was rested for the 1877 season. He returned to racing in 1878.

James J. Bevins purchased Vagrant in the 1880s and the horse raced for Bevins until 1882, when Vagrant became very lame after a race at Jerome Park Racetrack in the Bronx, New York . Vagrant's racing stats list only one start in 1883, indicating that he was permanently retired from racing at age ten.

Vagrant was widely rumored to have been a vegetable cart horse in Lexington after his racing career, having been sold into this service sometime after 1883.

A 1910 Daily Racing Form article states that Vagrant died at around 17 years of age (c. 1890) while being used as a saddle horse for a woman who lived on Long Island, New York.

=== Vagrant total race record ===
Year	# of Starts	# of Firsts	# of Seconds	# of Thirds	Earnings
1875	6	5	0	1	$3,800
1876	4	3	1	0	$6,540
1878	12	0	0	4	$0
1879	14	3	2	2	$1,175
1880	23	7	3	3	$1,500
1881	21	2	5	2	$875
1882	7	0	1	0	$75
1883	1	0	0	0	$0
Totals	88	20	12	12	$13,875

== Pedigree ==
Pedigree of Vagrant
Sire Virgil 1864	Vandal 1850	Glencoe I	Sultan
Sire Virgil 1864	Vandal 1850	Glencoe I	Trampoline
Sire Virgil 1864	Vandal 1850	Tranby Mare	Tranby
Sire Virgil 1864	Vandal 1850	Tranby Mare	Lucilla
Sire Virgil 1864	Hymenia 1851	Yorkshire	St Nicholas
Sire Virgil 1864	Hymenia 1851	Yorkshire	Miss Rose
Sire Virgil 1864	Hymenia 1851	Little Peggy	Cripple
Sire Virgil 1864	Hymenia 1851	Little Peggy	Peggy Stewart
Dam Lazy 1865	Scythian 1851	Orlando	Touchstone
Dam Lazy 1865	Scythian 1851	Orlando	Vulture
Dam Lazy 1865	Scythian 1851	Scythia	Hetman Platoff
Dam Lazy 1865	Scythian 1851	Scythia	The Princess
Dam Lazy 1865	Lindora 1856	Lexington	Boston
Dam Lazy 1865	Lindora 1856	Lexington	Alice Carneal
Dam Lazy 1865	Lindora 1856	Picayune	Medoc
Dam Lazy 1865	Lindora 1856	Picayune	Sally Howe
