= Edward H. Garrison =

American jockey (1868–1930)

- Edward Garrison, c. 1895

Personal information
- Born: February 9, 1868 New Haven, Connecticut, U.S.
- Died: October 28, 1930 (aged 62) Brooklyn, New York, U.S.
- Resting place: Holy Cross Cemetery, Brooklyn, N.Y.
- Occupation: Jockey

Horse racing career
- Sport: Horse racing
- Career wins: 700+

Major racing wins
- Great Eastern Handicap (1883, 1892); Flight Stakes (1887); Foam Stakes (1887, 1889, 1892); Jerome Handicap (1887, 1888, 1892); Monmouth Oaks (1887); Sapling Stakes (1887); Champion Stakes (1888); Coney Island Derby (1888); Freehold Stakes (1888); June Stakes (1888); Monmouth Handicap (1888); Great American Stakes (1889, 1890, 1892); Suburban Handicap (1889, 1892); Mermaid Stakes (1889); Spring Stakes (1889, 1892, 1894); Tremont Stakes (1889, 1890, 1894); Double Event Stakes (part 1) (1890); Twin City Handicap (1890); Withers Stakes (1890, 1892); Zephyr Stakes (1891); Dolphin Stakes (1892); Lawrence Realization Stakes (1892); Matron Stakes (1892); Toboggan Handicap (1892); American Derby (1893); Double Event Stakes (part 2) (1893, 1896); Great Trial Stakes (1893, 1894); Second Special Stakes (1893); Reapers Stakes (1893); Eclipse Stakes (1894) American Classic Race wins: Belmont Stakes (1891)

Honours
- United States' Racing Hall of Fame (1955); Fair Grounds Racing Hall of Fame (1971)

Significant horses
- Tammany, Firenze, Montana

Edward H. "Snapper" Garrison (February 9, 1868 – October 28, 1930) was an American jockey known for hanging back during most of the race and finishing at top speed to achieve a thrilling victory.

Garrison rode out of an East Coast base for sixteen years from 1882 through 1897. While there are no official records documenting all of his career races, he once estimated that he had ridden more than 700 winners during his career. Among his most spectacular wins was the 1892 Suburban Handicap on Montana and in 1893 at New Jersey's Guttenberg track on Tammany, both impressive finishes. Garrison was so well known for this that a contest where the winner pulls ahead at the last moment to score the victory is known as a Garrison finish.

Following the creation of the National Museum of Racing and Hall of Fame, Edward Garrison was part of the inaugural group inducted into the Hall of Fame in 1955.
