= John Reiff =

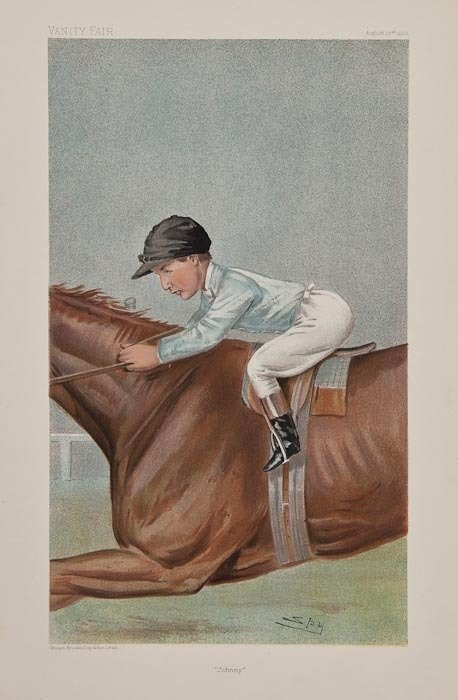
- Caricature of John Reiff in Vanity Fair, 23 Aug 1900

Personal information
- Born: 29 January 1885 Americus, Missouri
- Died: February 1974 (aged 89)
- Occupation: Jockey

Horse racing career
- Sport: Horse racing

Major racing wins
- Major race wins: 2000 Guineas Stakes (1913); Derby Stakes (1907, 1912); Dewhurst Stakes (1901)

Significant horses
- Game Chick, Louvois, Orby, Tagalie

John "Knickerbocker" Reiff (1885–1974) was an American flat racing jockey, whose greatest successes came in Great Britain where he won three Classics.

Reiff came to England with his older brother Lester to ride for the American trainer Enoch Wishard as part of an influx of American jockeys who gained success around the turn of the century. At the time, he weighed just over 5 stone and gained the nickname "Knickerbocker" because of his juvenile style of dress. Among the races he won as a young jockey were the Royal Hunt Cup and Stewards Cup on Royal Flush, the Ebor Handicap on Jiffy II and the Cambridgeshire Handicap on Watershed. In 1899, he registered 27 winners.

In October 1901 his brother had his licence withdrawn by the Jockey Club for "pulling" a horse so that it did not win. It was a commonly held view that John would do likewise to suit the American gamblers with whom he associated. As a result of this incident, the younger Reiff moved to France, where, for a time he had his licence rescinded for the same reason. Ultimately, though, he became France's leading jockey of 1902, when his wins included the French Derby on Retz. He won the French Oaks in 1913 on Moia.

Reiff still returned to England for big races and the trips brought his biggest successes. He won the Derby for American politician Richard Croker on Orby in 1907, and again in 1912 on the filly Tagalie, one of only six fillies and four greys to do so. He nearly won again on Craganour in the 1913 Derby, known as the "Suffragette Derby" after the death of suffragette Emily Davison on the track. However, he was disqualified for interference coming up the home straight. He did win the 2000 Guineas that year on Louvois, although ironically many present believed Craganour actually won the race and the judge had called it incorrectly.

== Major wins ==
(United Kingdom) Great Britain

- 2000 Guineas Stakes – Louvois (1913)
- Derby Stakes – Orby (1907), Tagalie (1912)
- Dewhurst Stakes – Game Chick (1901)

France

- Prix du Jockey Club - Retz (1902)
- Prix de Diane - Moia (1913)

== See also ==
- List of jockeys

== Bibliography ==
- Mortimer, Roger; Onslow, Richard; Willett, Peter (1978). Biographical Encyclopaedia of British Racing. London: Macdonald and Jane's. ISBN 0-354-08536-0.
- Tanner, Michael; Cranham, Gerry (1992). Great Jockeys of the Flat. Enfield, Middlesex: Guinness Publishing. ISBN 0-85112-989-7. OL 8266712M.
