= Day's Academy =

Religious school in Wrentham, United States

Day's Academy (also known as Wrentham Academy) was a former academy in Wrentham, Massachusetts that existed between 1806 and 1875 when it became the site of Wrentham's High School.

The school was chartered in 1806 for religious education through the Congregational church and originally existed on Wrentham's lower common before moving to 55 East Street (now the site of the Fiske Public Library). Benjamin Day donated $2,300 found the Academy, and the school received land from the State in 1806. Day's Academy operated until 1875, the town purchased its land to construct a high school. The trustees constructed a hall to be used by the public and for a Sunday School. The remainder of the academy's property was transferred to the town.

== Notable people ==
- Benjamin Bates IV, industrialist, namesake of Bates College
- John Fox Slater, abolitionist, businessman, philanthropist
- Frederick D. Ely, Congressman
- George S. Greene, Civil War general
