= George E. Smith (gambler) =

American businessman

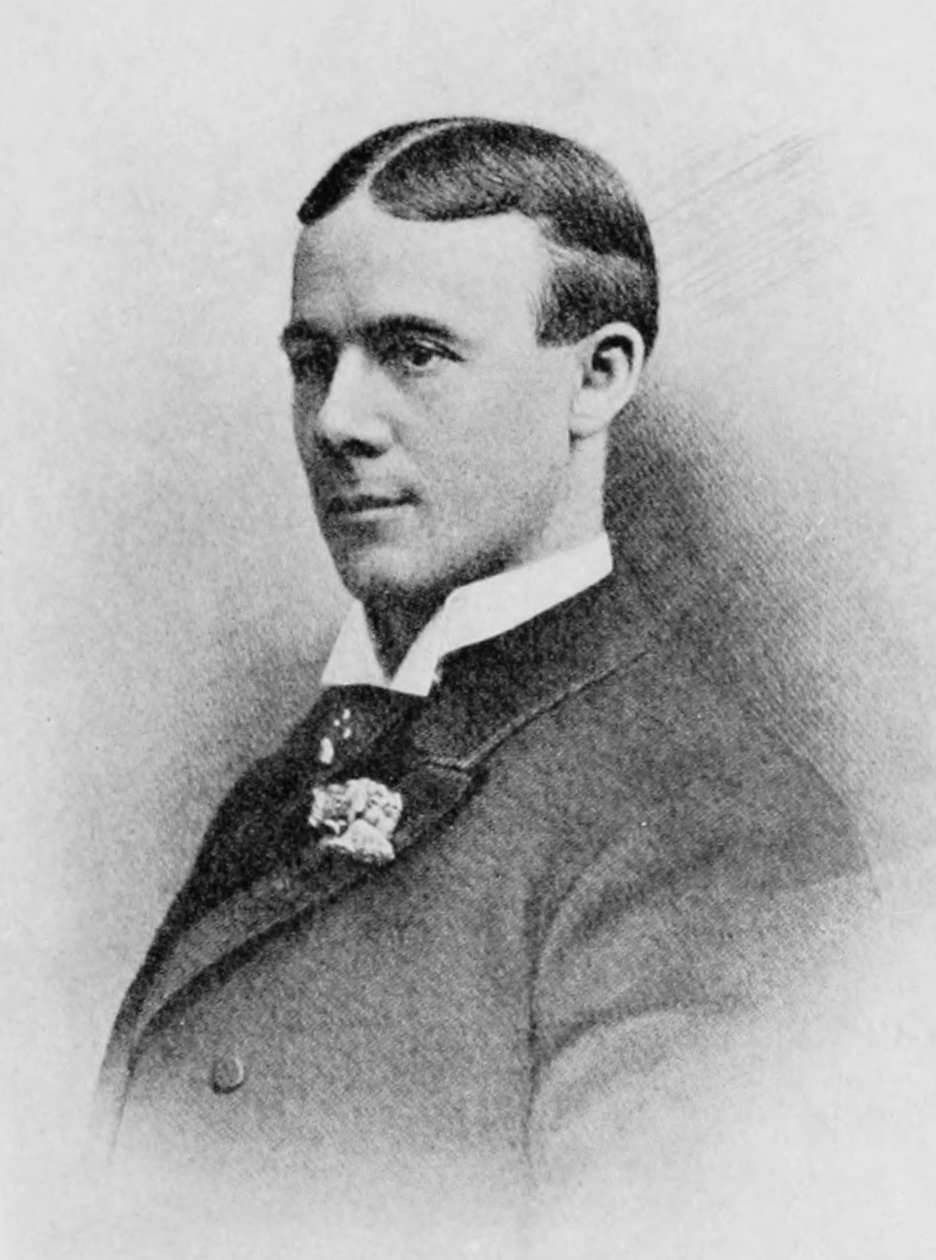
- Born: July 13, 1862; Sewickley, Pennsylvania, U.S.
- Died: February 1, 1905 (aged 42); Asheville, North Carolina, U.S.
- Resting place: Union Dale Cemetery, Pittsburgh
- Other name: Pittsburgh Phil
- Occupations: Cork cutter, professional gambler
- Known for: Handicapping, Thoroughbred racehorse owner

George Elsworth Smith (July 13, 1862 – February 1, 1905) was an American gambler and Thoroughbred horse racing enthusiast who became a multi-millionaire during the late nineteenth and early twentieth century. Smith was given the nickname "Pittsburgh Phil" in 1885 by Chicago gambler William "Silver Bill" Riley to differentiate him from the other Smiths that also frequented Riley's pool halls. Pittsburgh Phil is considered by many handicappers to have been an expert strategist, winning large sums of money at a time when racing statistic publications, such as The Daily Racing Form, were not widely available. At the time of his death from tuberculosis in 1905, he had amassed a fortune worth $3,250,000, which is comparable to $US 116,458,333 today. His racing Maxims, published posthumously in 1908, are considered to be the foundations of many modern handicapping strategies and formulas.

== Early life and initial occupation ==
=== Family ===
George Elsworth Smith was born in Sewickley, Pennsylvania, in 1862 to Elizabeth ("Eliza") and Christian Smith. The Smith family also included two sisters, Annie and Elizabeth, and another son, William C. Smith, that was a few years younger than George Smith. His mother was originally from Ireland and emigrated to the United States in 1857, and his father was a carpenter from Baden, Germany. Eliza remarried after Christian Smith's death in the early 1870s to retail grocer Edward Downing, who died in the 1880s. She remarried a second time on November 20, 1906, to real estate and coal developer Thomas S. Wood after George Smith's death.

George Smith's sister Anne married and had a son named James Christian McGill (1880–1972). McGill was orphaned at a young age when his parents died in the mid-1880s during an unspecified epidemic and was subsequently raised, along with his infant sister Eleanor, by Mrs. Smith and George Smith. Smith was a notoriously reticent and shy individual that only granted one interview during his lifetime, in which he relayed only information pertaining to racing matters. Consequently, much of the published biographical information on Pittsburgh Phil's early life, his rise to fame and the reasoning behind his methods on the track comes from interviews with his nephew, James McGill, who was a close confidant in the ten years preceding George Smith's death.

=== Cork cutting and early sporting exploits ===
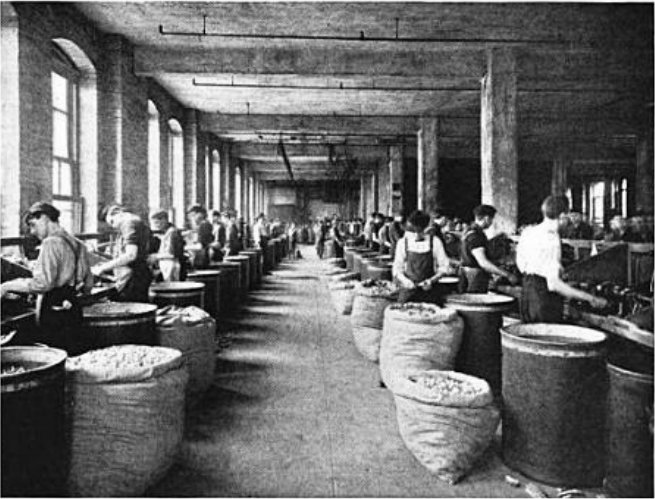
Cork blocking, the initial occupation of Smith, at a Pittsburgh cork factory in the early 1900s.

The Smith family initially lived on a small farm in Sewickley, Pennsylvania, but moved in 1872 to Allegheny City when George Smith was 10 years old. The Smiths eventually settled in the neighborhood of Pleasant Valley, which was located across the Ohio River from Pittsburgh in the present day city neighborhood of California-Kirkbride. George Smith's father died within a year (in late 1872 or 1873), which created financial hardships for his mother and sisters and resulted in George going to work at the age of 12 at the local cork cutting factory (possibly Armstrong Cork Co.) for $5 per week. Smith was not happy with this occupation, once remarking on the banality of the profession later in life: "[I] thought [I] could do a little better than cutting corks, inasmuch as [I] knew how to divide six by two." Smith set aside money from his weekly pay (after giving the majority to his mother) to purchase and train gamecocks, hiding the fowl from his devout Roman Catholic mother and sisters who greatly disapproved of gambling. He also bet on the outcomes of National League baseball games in Pittsburgh pool halls and would attribute his often sizable winnings to pay raises at the cork factory.

Most of the pool halls in 1870s Pittsburgh also broadcast horse races via telegraph. The often colorful race descriptions soon captured young Smith's attention and he wrote down and stockpiled the names and times of the winning horses for a year to form crude racing charts. In the fall of 1879, Smith placed his first bet on a 5:1 odds horse named Gabriel running in a race at the Brighton Beach racetrack at Coney Island. He won $38 when the horse won by 2 lengths but did not show any outward signs of emotion while the race was run. Determined that he could win at horse racing, Smith quit his job at the cork factory and accrued more than $5,000 from betting on horse races in the next two years, hiding the proceeds under his mattress at home. Upon his mother eventually discovering the money, he reasoned with her that he was not really gambling because he was making logical predictions based on the past performances of horses and not merely guessing. By 1885, Smith had become one of the most touted gamblers in Pittsburgh and had won over $100,000 without ever seeing a horse race run firsthand. However, Smith was becoming too famous in Pittsburgh. He could not maintain the favorable, high odds when placing bets that he had attained earlier in his career when he was a virtual unknown because everyone in the crowd would lower the odds by betting his choices.

== "Pittsburgh Phil" ==
=== A new name ===
The first horse race that Smith witnessed live was the 1885 Kentucky Derby in which Joe Cotton was the favorite and won at 4:5 odds, but he did not bet on the outcome. Smith decided that the best gambling prospects at the time were in Chicago and made his way to William "Silver Bill" Riley's poolroom in late 1885. Riley was a Civil War veteran from Brooklyn with prematurely gray hair that owned one of the first clubs in Chicago dedicated to betting on horse racing. It was Riley that saddled Smith with the nickname "Pittsburgh Phil" on their first meeting to differentiate George Smith's bets from the rest of the "room full of Smiths." Riley usually named his customers based on their appearances, but by McGill's reckoning he chose the name "Pittsburgh Phil" because Smith was from Pittsburgh and Phil was short for Philadelphia. Smith quickly gained a reputation as being one of the most successful "plungers", or men that bet large sums of money on races, in Chicago. Within a few years, he relocated to New York City and focused most of his betting operations out of New York tracks.

=== King Cadmus and Parvenu ===
Smith also purchased and raced Thoroughbred horses under the name Pleasant Valley Stable. His racing colors during the early 1890s were royal-purple and canary yellow. Smith's brother, Bill, became his principal horse trainer during the 1890s and early 1900s. One of his most successful horses was a two-year-old bay colt named King Cadmus. Smith purchased King Cadmus as a yearling in 1890 for $4,000 at the stable dispersal sale of the late August Belmont. The colt was a son of Kingfisher and was a full brother to another popular racehorse named King Crab. The horse only won two races in his entire racing career, but Smith won $195,000 from Cadmus' two victories. The first win occurred on September 3, 1891, at Sheepshead Bay Race Track and resulted in Smith winning approximately $115,000, which was the largest payout from a horse race recorded in the US at that time. Cadmus' other win occurred at Morris Park Racetrack in 1892 with Smith netting another $80,000. King Cadmus was a fast runner but he had a vicious temperament, seriously injuring several of Smith's employees, in addition to weak legs and was sold as a three-year-old in 1892.

Parvenu (sired by Uncas, out of Necromancy) was purchased by Smith in 1891 as a two-year-old and was initially considered to be a poor racing prospect by the general public due to his repeated losses early in the season. However, Smith saw potential in the colt and recognized that he could win a large amount of money if the horse could win a race against high odds. On August 29, 1892, Parvenu was entered in a race at Sheepshead Bay and was given 30:1 initial odds by bookmakers, which would have won Smith close to $300,000. However all bets had to be rescinded before the start of the race because there was a miscalculation of the horse handicapping weights, causing the odds on Parvenu to drop to 10:1 in the new pool. As a result, Smith only won $50,000. But despite this mishap, Smith was rewarded when the horse won nine consecutive races, netting approximately $200,000 before Parvenu was retired at age four due to a spinal injury.

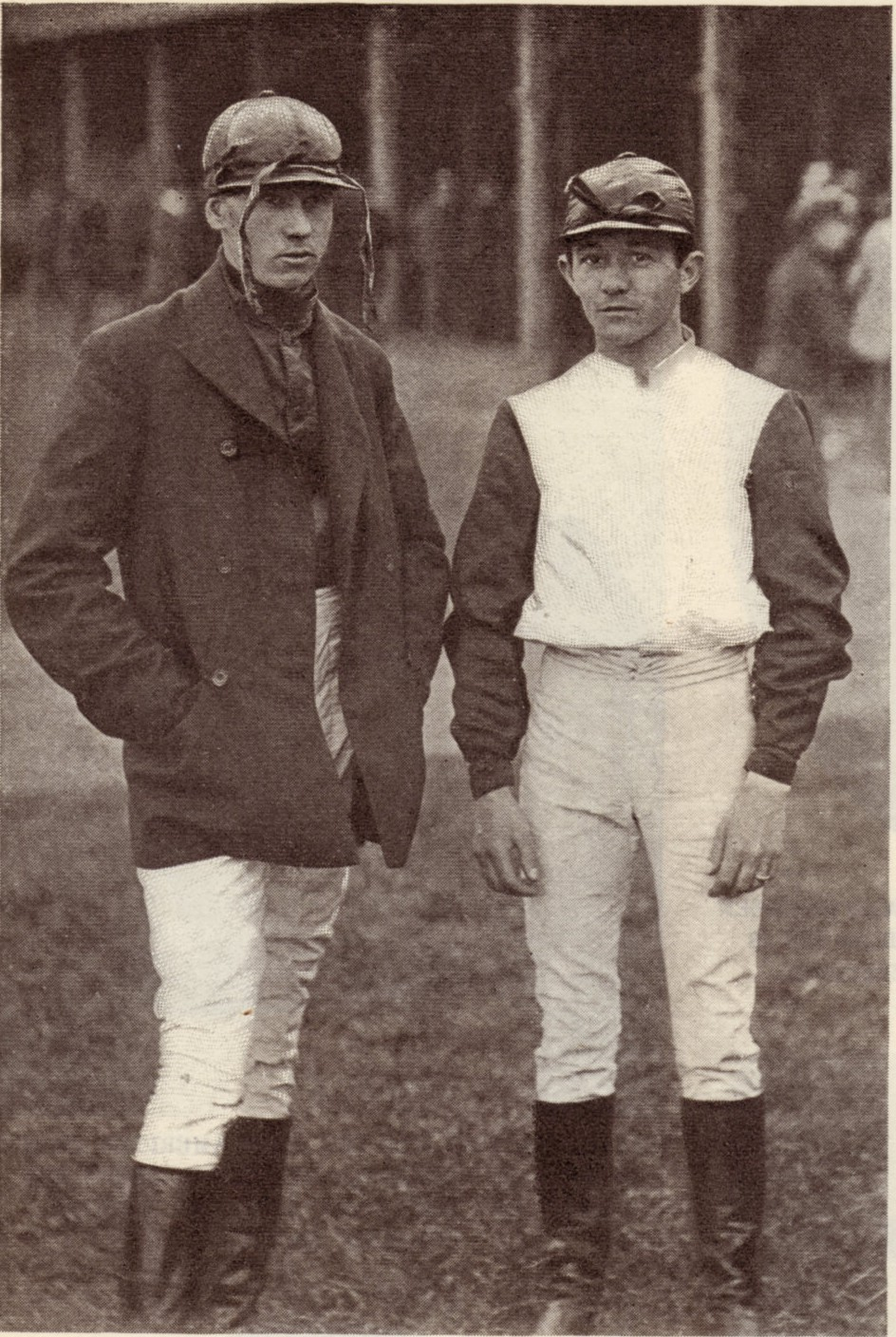
Jockeys Skeets Martin (left) and Tod Sloan at Morris Park Racetrack in 1899.

=== Professional relationship with Tod Sloan ===
Smith employed several jockeys on a race-to-race basis during his career as a Thoroughbred owner, including Henry "Skeets" Martin, Fred Taral, Edward Garrison and Samuel Doggett. However, Smith considered Tod Sloan to be the best jockey in his employ and commissioned the rider to race in only his colors from 1895 to 1897. Smith met Sloan in the fall of 1895 at a San Francisco racetrack after Sloan had been suspended for ten days for trying to "beat the barrier", or disregarding the starting barrier that had recently been adopted at US tracks. Smith was taken with Sloan's unique riding style, later termed the "monkey crouch", that redistributed the rider's weight over the neck and withers and allowed horses to run faster. However, Smith did not trust the bookmakers at the California tracks and suspected them, as well as the trainers, of rampant cheating and paying off jockeys to not win on certain horses. Consequently, Smith paid Sloan $500 for every race he won, insuring that his jockey would always be trying to win on any of Smith's mounts. Sloan returned to New York with Smith in 1896 where he became one of the top jockeys on the east coast, giving Smith the most profitable years of his career.

Smith soon tired of Sloan's off-track antics, which included lavish parties and often arrogant statements that questioned Smith's judgment on the track. A case in point was Sloan's behavior prior to the running of 1897 Brooklyn Handicap which occurred over a sloppy, mud-laden track that year. Sloan had won several races on Belmar, a gray 5-year old by Belvidere, and felt confident that the horse would win the Brooklyn Handicap, openly criticizing Smith's choice of Howard Mann in front of his other employees. However, Smith knew that Belmar was not a fast runner in the mud and that Sloan would not push the horse to win because he disliked being splattered with mud. Smith instead put Skeets Martin, who was better at racing on sloppy tracks, on the 4-year old Howard Mann. He advised Martin to, "Use your own judgment with this horse, and don't bother about Belmar. Tod probably won't be anywhere near you after the first hundred yards." Howard Mann won easily, winning $50,000 for Smith, while Belmar finished in 8th place. When James R. Keene asked Smith in late 1897 for permission to take Sloan to England to race in the Cambridgeshire Handicap, Smith accepted the offer. Sloan achieved great success while racing in England, but he lost his racing license permanently in 1900. Sloan and Smith remained friends after dissolving their partnership, the later loaning Sloan $5,000 without interest after his license was revoked. After Sloan's departure, Smith used Skeets Martin as his principal jockey, but in 1899 Martin also left the US for better racing prospects in England. Willie Shaw was ultimately hired to replace Sloan and raced for Smith from 1899 until 1903.

=== Suspension ===
Smith kept few horses in 1902 and consequently allowed James R. Keene to employ Willie Shaw for much of the season. While his overall percentage of wins was still high, Shaw lost some races in a way that the general public thought was suspicious and he was accused of not trying to win. Shaw's poor performance was soon linked to some action on Smith's part and he was accused of paying the jockey to lose, a claim which Smith vehemently denied. In May 1903, Shaw was suspended by The Jockey Club for presumed "listless" riding on Illyria at a May 6 race at the Jamaica Racetrack. On June 24, 1903, Smith was also banned from entering his horses in races overseen by The Jockey Club. He admitted to no wrongdoing, and he suspected the ban was a hold-over from Willie Shaw's suspension and resulted from The Jockey Club's increased efforts to remove plungers from their tracks. Smith continued to make bets, notably securing $60,000 when Africander won the 1903 Suburban Handicap, but had sold his stable to E. E. Smathers by the end of the year.

== Personal life ==
Smith lived in moderation compared to other horsemen of the era, with the only outward display of ostentation being a diamond ring that he would wear to track engagements. Smith also did not smoke and only drank an occasional glass of wine. He socialized with very few women and was considered to be a confirmed bachelor by his family. He was adamant about not bringing women to racetracks, even his own mother, including a reference to their distracting influence on men in his Maxims.

"A man who wishes to be successful cannot divide his attentions between horses and women. A man who accepts the responsibility of escorting a woman to the race track, and of seeing that she is comfortably placed and agreeably entertained, cannot keep his mind on his work before him...A sensible woman understands this and cannot feel hurt at my words."

However, Smith did court Daisy Dixon, an aspiring actress and chorus girl from Chicago, in 1896. The courtship turned sour after he caught her cavorting with his jockey and notorious ladies man Tod Sloan. Dixon later married fellow gambler, Riley Grannan, who eventually died broke in Rawhide, Nevada, in 1908. According to McGill, Smith never had an interest in another woman after Dixon's betrayal.

== Methods ==
Smith took notice of every detail in horse racing. He kept detailed notes of which horses were good runners during muddy conditions and always inspected horses at the end of a race to look for subtle signs of lameness or impediments (i.e. loose girth straps) that may have negatively impacted a horse's speed. As he became more famous and seemingly successful, bookmakers would often refuse to place his bets outright for fear of losing money when he won. As a result, Smith conducted most of his betting through "beards", or men that he would commission to place bets for him. Smith tried to keep the identity of his beards a secret and never revealed their identities, even to his other commissioners. His movements were continuously followed by agents for the bookmakers and by the Pinkerton detectives employed by The Jockey Club.

"They wanted to know everything I did and was going to do. That never made me mad because it was business on their part just as it was business for me to mislead the spies. I rarely have been able to keep the same set of betting commissioners for any length of time. A few bets and my commissioners were pointed out and watched."

Smith rarely wrote down his bets and relied on his memory to serve him when he won and had to collect his money from the numerous commissioners that placed his bets with the bookmakers.

== Death and legacy ==
1916 Kentucky Derby winner George Smith was named after "Pittsburgh Phil."

By the fall of 1903, Smith began curtailing his turf activities for frequent trips to the Adirondacks and Hot Springs to rest. His family assumed that his "nerves" were affected from the stress of his and Shaw's suspension from racing, but Smith had also developed a persistent cough by the early months of 1904. He made his last bet, 4:1 on High Chancellor, at the Sheepshead Bay racetrack during the summer of 1904 and won $2,000.

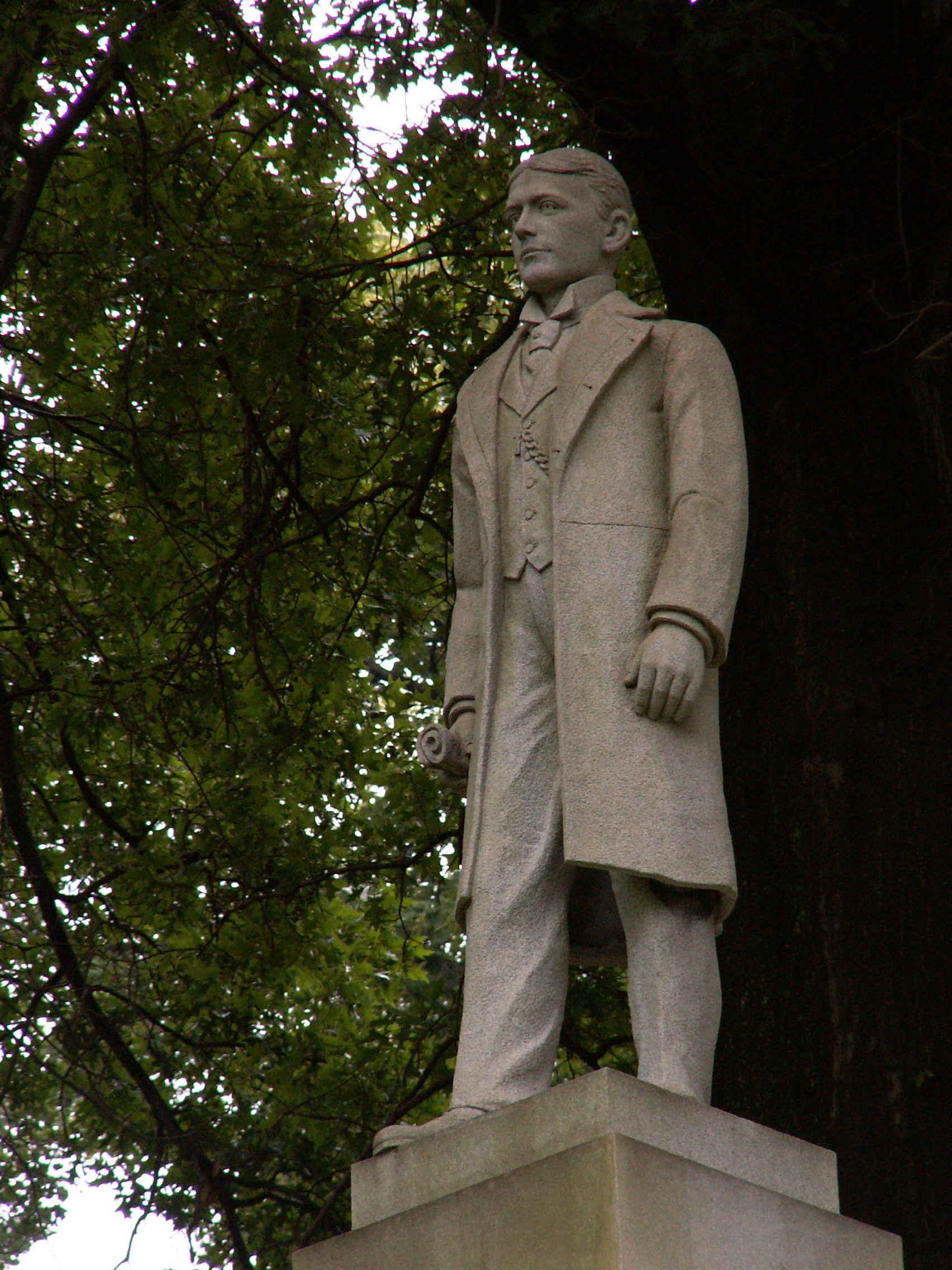
Statue of “Pittsburg Phil” (George E. Smith, 1862–1905) on his mausoleum in the Union Dale Cemetery, Pittsburgh

In October 1904, Smith traveled to the Winyah Sanitarium in Asheville, North Carolina, for treatment of his worsening cough, a result of advanced tuberculosis. George E. Smith died at the sanitarium on February 1, 1905. His death was attributed to "shattering of his nerves", instead of tuberculosis, due to his habit of never showing emotion. Smith was interred in Union Dale Cemetery in Pittsburgh, a short distance from his childhood home in Allegheny. His funeral occurred on February 5 during a snowstorm and was attended by many people. He was entombed in a stone mausoleum that reportedly cost $30,000 to build and was built to Smith's specifications seven years before his death. His mother later commissioned a statue in his likeness and placed it on top of the mausoleum. The statue depicts Smith, hatless and wearing a suit, looking toward Pittsburgh while clutching a racing form.

Smith's net worth, including real estate and stocks and bonds, was $3,250,000, and as he had no will his estate was divided equally among his mother, brother, nephew (James McGill) and niece (Eleanor Ewing). William Smith and James McGill later moved to Indianapolis in 1913 after purchasing the Indianapolis Baseball Club for $150,000. George Smith, the 1916 Kentucky Derby winner, was named after Pittsburgh Phil because he had once owned the colt's dam, Consuelo II. His racing Maxims, gleaned from his only interview with Edward Cole a few years before his death, are still considered valid by modern handicappers.
