= Belmar (horse) =

American-bred Thoroughbred racehorse

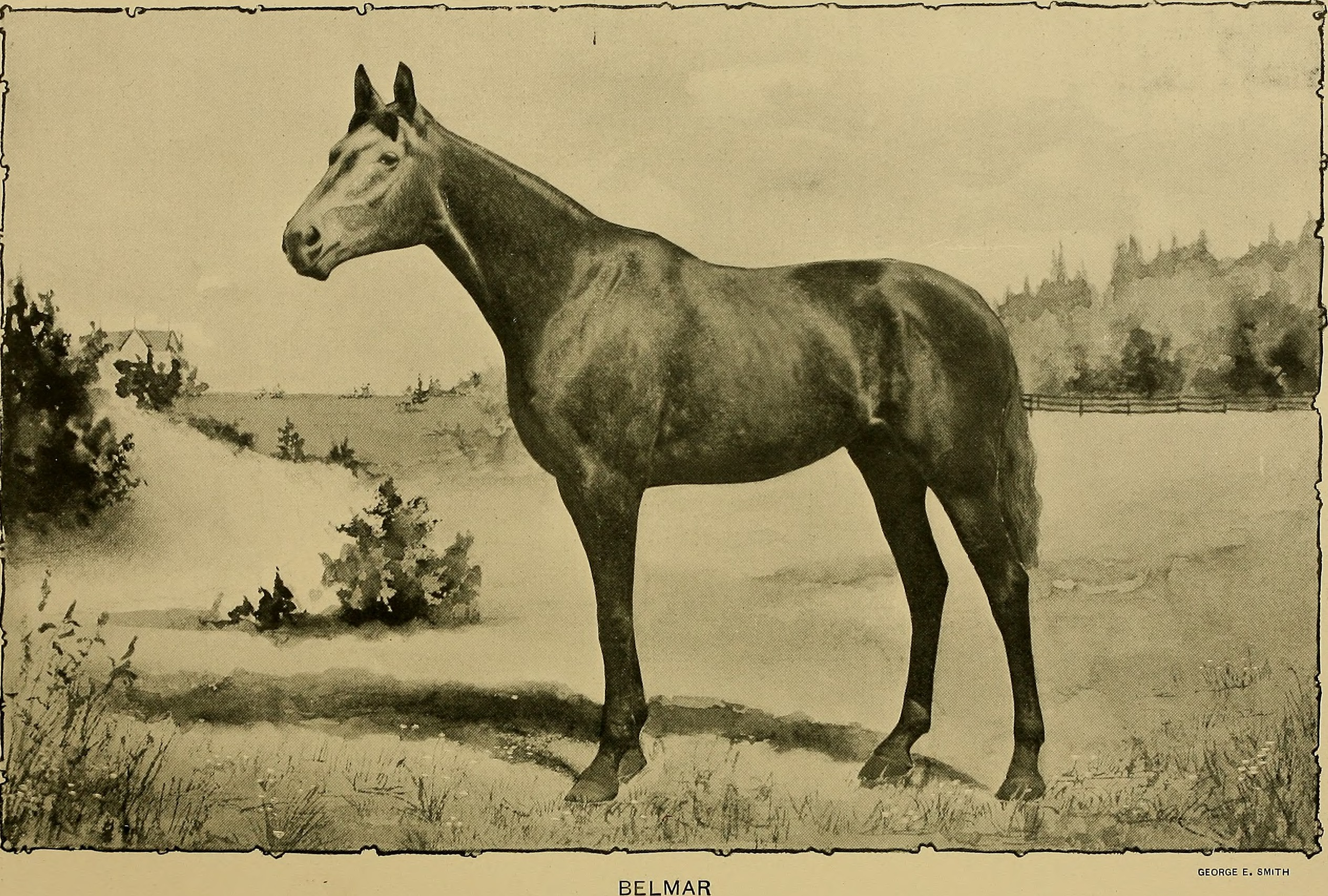
- From The American turf (1898)
- Sire: Belvidere
- Grandsire: Billet
- Dam: Adele
- Damsire: Australian
- Sex: Stallion
- Foaled: 1892
- Country: United States
- Colour: Gray
- Breeder: James Galway
- Owner: 1) Preakness Stables; 2) George E. Smith
- Trainer: 1) Edward Feakes; 2) William Smith
- Record: Not found
- Earnings: Not found

Major wins
- Manhattan Handicap (1896); Ocean Handicap (1897); Triple Crown wins: Preakness Stakes (1895); Belmont Stakes (1895)
- Last updated on December 26, 2018

Belmar (foaled in 1892) was an American Thoroughbred racehorse owned by James Galway's Preakness Stables of Preakness, New Jersey.

== Racing career ==
Belmar was trained by Edward Feakes and ridden by future U.S. Racing Hall of Fame jockey Fred Taral. He earned his first victory just four days before he ran in the 1895 Preakness. He nonetheless went off as the second choice and won by a length. That year, the Belmont was held on November 2 because, according to the official chart, "New York Jockey Club closed out its affairs. Race run under the jurisdiction of the Westchester Racing Association." Belmar, who was the fourth choice in a field of five, won by a neck over the favorite, Counter Tenor, while carrying 7 pounds less.

In 1896, Belmar won the Manhattan Handicap at Morris Park Racecourse in The Bronx, New York. In 1897, he won the Ocean Handicap at Sheepshead Bay Race Track in Brooklyn.

In his later racing career, Belmar was owned by the handicapper "Pittsburgh Phil" and was trained by William "Bill" Smith. In a 1908 interview, Bill Smith said that Belmar was one of the best horses he ever trained and was notorious for winning his races in a close finish, usually by a head or neck. Belmar was standing at the farm of T.L. Watt in Westchester County in 1908 as a stallion for the breeding bureau.

== Pedigree ==
Pedigree of Belmar
Sire Belvidere 1884	Billet 1865	Voltigeur	Voltaire
Sire Belvidere 1884	Billet 1865	Voltigeur	Martha Lynn
Sire Belvidere 1884	Billet 1865	Calcutta	Flatcatcher
Sire Belvidere 1884	Billet 1865	Calcutta	Miss Martin
Sire Belvidere 1884	Jaconet 1875	Leamington	Faugh-a-Ballagh
Sire Belvidere 1884	Jaconet 1875	Leamington	Pantaloon Mare
Sire Belvidere 1884	Jaconet 1875	Maggie B B	Australian*
Sire Belvidere 1884	Jaconet 1875	Maggie B B	Madeline
Dam Adele 1876	Australian* 1858	West Australian	Melbourne
Dam Adele 1876	Australian* 1858	West Australian	Mowerina
Dam Adele 1876	Australian* 1858	Emilia	Young Emilius
Dam Adele 1876	Australian* 1858	Emilia	Persian
Dam Adele 1876	Lightning Mare 1870	Lightning	Lexington
Dam Adele 1876	Lightning Mare 1870	Lightning	Blue Bonnet
Dam Adele 1876	Lightning Mare 1870	Revenue Mare	Revenue
Dam Adele 1876	Lightning Mare 1870	Revenue Mare	Minnow

* Belmar is inbred 4S x 2D to the stallion Australian, meaning that he appears fourth generation on the sire side of his pedigree and second generation on the dam side of his pedigree.
