= Milton H. Sanford =

American lawyer

- Born: August 29, 1813; Medway, Massachusetts, US
- Died: August 3, 1883 (aged 69); Newport, Rhode Island, US
- Resting place: Evergreen Cemetery, Medway, Massachusetts
- Occupations: Textile manufacturer, racehorse owner/breeder
- Spouses: Anna T. Davenport; Cordelia Riddle
- Parent(s): Sewall Sanford & Edena Holbrook
- Relatives: Edwards S. Sanford (brother)
- Honors: Sanford Street, Medway, Massachusetts

Milton Holbrook Sanford (August 29, 1813 – August 3, 1883) was an American businessman, lawyer, and owner/breeder of Thoroughbred racehorses.

== Early life ==
Sanford was born in Medway, Massachusetts, on August 29, 1813. He was the eldest of four children born to Sewall Sanford and Edena Holbrook. His younger brother was Brig.-Gen. Edwards S. Sanford.

== Career ==
Sanford became one of the Medway's greatest benefactors. Sanford owned wool and cotton mills and made a fortune manufacturing blankets for the Union Army during the American Civil War. In 1883 he built the Sanford Textile Mill in Medway which still stands to this day as a condominium property.

=== Thoroughbred horse racing ===
Milton H. Sanford owned Preakness Stud, located at what is now the corner of Valley Road and Preakness Avenue in Preakness, New Jersey, as well as the 544-acre (2.20 km^{2}) Preakness Stud Farm in Lexington, Kentucky, reflecting his long-standing interest in Thoroughbred horse racing.

In the summer of 1868, following a day of racing at Saratoga Race Course, Milton Sanford hosted a now famous dinner party for horsemen and other distinguished guests at the Union Hall Hotel in Saratoga Springs, New York. During the evening, John W. Hunter suggested that the occasion be marked with the creation of a Stakes race to be called the Dinner Party Stakes with a very substantial purse of $15,000. It was agreed that the race be held in the fall of 1870 and be open to three-year-old colts and fillies at a distance of two miles (3 km). Maryland governor Oden Bowie was in attendance and he promised that if the race would be run in Maryland, he would see to it that a new racetrack would be built to host it. As a result, Pimlico Race Course in Baltimore was built and on October 25, 1870, a horse named Preakness owned by Milton Sanford won the inaugural Dinner Party Stakes. The Preakness Stakes, established at Pimlico Race Course in 1873, was named in honor of Sanford's horse.

In 1881, the 68-year-old Milton Sanford sold Preakness Stud in Kentucky to Daniel Swigert, who renamed it Elmendorf Farm.

== Personal life ==
He died less than two years later at his summerhouse at 72 Washington Street in Newport, Rhode Island. The property, designed by William Ralph Emerson, is now a bed and breakfast called the Sanford-Covell Villa Marina

Milton Sanford is buried in his birthplace of Medway, Massachusetts where Sanford Hall and Sanford Street are named in his honor.
