= John Daly (gambler) =

American gambler

- Born: c. 1838; Troy, New York, United States
- Died: April 26, 1906 (aged 68); Midtown Manhattan, New York
- Occupations: Sportsman and professional gambler
- Known for: Sportsman, gambler and underworld figure in New York during the late 19th century.

John Daly (c. 1838 – April 26, 1906) was an American sportsman, professional gambler and underworld figure in New York during the late 19th century. A protégé of John Morrissey, he was involved in illegal gambling on Broadway and in Midtown Manhattan for over thirty years. He was also among the principal rivals of "Honest" John Kelly up until the turn of the 20th century and was considered one of the most successful and wealthiest gamblers in New York at the time of his death.

== Biography ==
John Daly was born in Troy, New York in about 1838. He became interested in gambling at an early age spending much of his time at the local gambling house, one of many owned by sportsman John Morrissey, with whom he soon became acquainted. Daly became a protégé of his and was eventually brought to New York where he earned a small fortune by the late 1860s. He owned a number of establishments, such as the Long Branch Club in Long Branch, New Jersey; however, his popular Broadway gaming resort was the one that he was most associated with. Daly later moved his gambling operations uptown and, in 1885, opened "John Daly's" at West Twenty-Ninth Street, which became nationally known and one of the most popular spots in the city during the next twenty years.

== Thoroughbred racing ==
Daly was also involved in horseracing during this time and was considered one of the biggest operators in the race-track betting rings in the country. He also raced horses, both alone and with partners, before forming a partnership with David Gideon in 1891. In their first year, they won the Futurity Stakes with His Highness and would dominate the competition for another four years. They twice won the Futurity with The Butterflies (1894) and Requital (1895) as well as the Suburban Handicap with Ramapo. The firm "Gideon & Daly" established a breeding farm near Red Bank, New Jersey called the "Holmdel Stud", but the property was leased when Daly retired from horse racing. Daly had mixed success in this enterprise, having lost a lot of money on both betting on the races and in the stock market.

John Daly was associated with many political and underworld figures in his lifetime but was reportedly far closer to fellow sportsmen gamblers such as William Busteed, Sam Emery, Davy Johnson, Dinky Davis, and Richard Canfield, his eventual successor. His establishments were sometimes subjected to police raids, and Daly was alleged to have paid protection money as high as $100,000 a week to the New York Police Department, which led to his later involvement in the Lexow Committee investigations. Daly was described as "a man of quiet, engaging manners" and regarded as a "generous employer", often continuing to pay his operators and allowing their families to live in his clubhouses even while his clubs were shut down by police raids. He also donated large portions of his income to charities in his later years. He was in ill health for two years prior to his death. Daly's wife died in 1905, and Daly died at his East Fifty-Fourth Street home on the evening of April 26, 1906.
