= 1899 in sports =

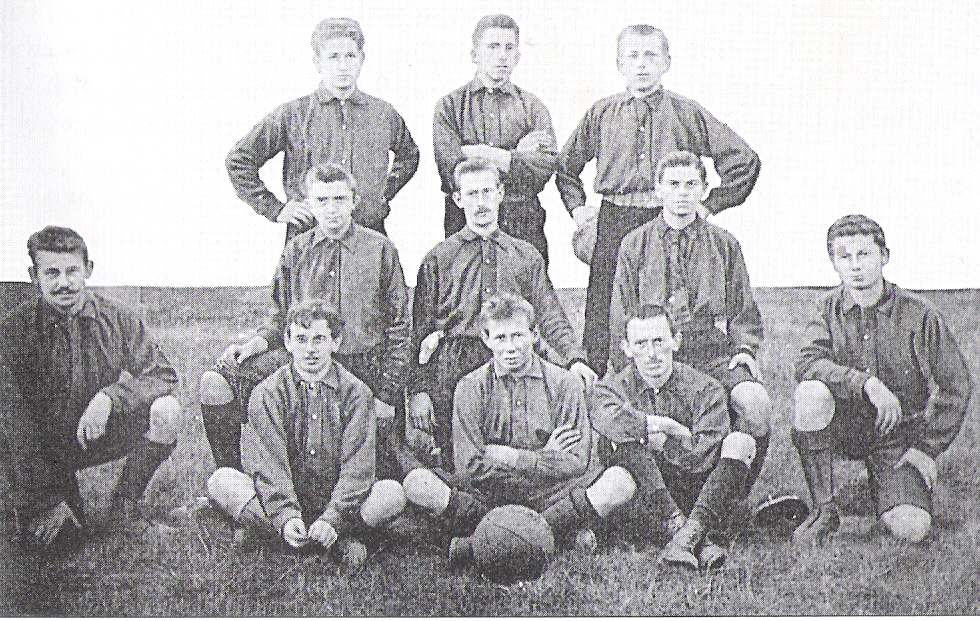
In Germany, Frankfurter FC Victoria, a predecessor club of Eintracht Frankfurt, is founded.

1899 in sports describes the year's events in world sport.

== American football ==
College championship

- College football national championship – Harvard Crimson
- November 18 – On the final game of its season, the Harvard University college football team, having a record of 10 wins (nine by shutout) and no defeats, hosts its rival, Yale University (7-1-0) and plays to a scoreless tie before 35,000 fans. Although Harvard's 1899 streak of defeating every opponent is ended by the tie, the Crimson team will be selected retroactively (and recognized by the NCAA Record Book) as the 1899 mythical national champion by the Helms Athletic Foundation.

Professional championships

- Western Pennsylvania champions – Duquesne Country and Athletic Club

Events

- The 1899 Sewanee Tigers football team goes undefeated, 12–0, including five road wins in six days over top teams.

== Association football ==
England

- The Football League – Aston Villa 45 points, Liverpool 43, Burnley 39, Everton 38, Notts County 37, Blackburn Rovers 36
- FA Cup final – Sheffield United 4–1 Derby County at Crystal Palace, London.

France

- Foundation of Olympique de Marseille
- Lyon Olympique Universitaire, as predecessor for Olympique Lyonnais, officially founded.

Germany

- Foundation of TSG 1899 Hoffenheim, Eintracht Frankfurt and SV Werder Bremen

Hungary

- Ferencváros TC was founded in suburb of Budapest on May 3.

Italy

- Foundation of A.C. Milan as the Milan Associazione Calcio (Milan Association Football).

The Netherlands

- The first KNVB Cup of the Royal Dutch Football Association is won by RAP Amsterdam in extra time, 1 to 0, over HVV Den Haag.

Scotland

- Scottish Football League – Rangers
- Scottish Cup – Celtic 2–0 Rangers

Spain

- 29 November — FC Barcelona founded by a Swiss, Hans Gamper, who wants to establish football in the city.

Uruguay

- Club Nacional of Montevideo was founded in Montevideo.

== Athletics ==
- USA Outdoor Track and Field Championships
- Lawrence Brignolia won the third running of the Boston Marathon

== Australian rules football ==
VFL Premiership

- Fitzroy wins the 3rd VFL Premiership: Fitzroy 3.9 (27) d South Melbourne 3.8 (26) at Junction Oval

== Baseball ==
National championship

- National League championship – Brooklyn Superbas. Brooklyn's team features many former Baltimore Orioles players including Ned Hanlon, Willie Keeler, Hughie Jennings and Joe Kelley.

Events

- Cleveland Spiders finish last in the twelve-team NL and establish an all-time major league record with 134 losses in a season, 84 games behind the pennant winner and 35 games out of 11th place. The team plays 113 games on the road, losing a record 102. They are dropped during the off-season when the National League contracts from twelve to eight teams.

== Basketball ==
Events

- Kansas played their first men's basketball game against the Kansas City YMCA, losing 5–16. The Jayhawks were coached by the inventor of basketball James Naismith. Kansas quickly became one of the most prestigious college basketball programs in the nation.

== Boxing ==
Lineal world champions

- World Heavyweight Championship – Bob Fitzsimmons → James J. Jeffries
- World Middleweight Championship – Tommy Ryan
- World Welterweight Championship – "Mysterious" Billy Smith
- World Lightweight Championship – George "Kid" Lavigne → Frank Erne
- World Featherweight Championship – George Dixon
- World Bantamweight Championship – Jimmy Barry → Barry retires undefeated → "Terrible" Terry McGovern → title vacant after McGovern moves up a weight

== Canadian Football ==
- The Dominion Championship was not held this year.
- Ontario Rugby Football Union - Kingston Granites
- Quebec Rugby Football Union - Ottawa College
- Manitoba Rugby Football Union - St John's
- Intercollegiate Rugby Football Union - University of Toronto

== Cricket ==
Events

- Four of the five Test matches in the 1899 Ashes series are drawn. Australia wins the Second Test at Lord's to take the series 1–0, their first series win in England since the original Ashes match in 1882.
- W G Grace makes his final appearance for England in Test cricket in the First Test at Trent Bridge. In the same match, Wilfred Rhodes makes his Test debut.
- Worcestershire becomes the fifteenth team in the County Championship, debuting with an 11-run loss to Yorkshire despite earning a 78-run lead on first innings. They eventually finished twelfth with two wins in 12 games.
- W G Grace plays his last first-class game for Gloucestershire, having fallen out with them over his involvement with London County.
- K S Ranjitsinhji becomes the first batsman to score 3000 runs in a season.

England

- County Championship – Surrey
- Minor Counties Championship – Buckinghamshire and Northamptonshire share the title
- Most runs – K S Ranjitsinhji 3159 @ 63.18 (HS 197)
- Most wickets – Albert Trott 239 @ 17.09 (BB 8–64)
- Wisden Five Cricketers of the Season – Joe Darling, Clem Hill, Arthur Jones, Monty Noble, Robert Poore

Australia

- Sheffield Shield – Victoria
- Most runs – Victor Trumper 873 @ 62.35 (HS 292*)
- Most wickets – Ernie Jones 45 @ 27.53 (BB 6–154)

India

- Bombay Presidency – Europeans

South Africa

- Currie Cup – not contested

West Indies

- Inter-Colonial Tournament – not contested

== Cycling ==
Road racing

- Bordeaux–Paris road race won by Constant Huret

== Figure skating ==
World Figure Skating Championships

- World Men's Champion – Gustav Hügel (Austria)

== Golf ==
Major tournaments

- British Open – Harry Vardon
- U.S. Open – Willie Smith

Other tournaments

- British Amateur – John Ball
- US Amateur – H. M. Harriman

== Horse racing ==
England

- Grand National – Manifesto
- 1,000 Guineas Stakes – Sibola
- 2,000 Guineas Stakes – Flying Fox
- The Derby – Flying Fox
- The Oaks – Musa
- St. Leger Stakes – Flying Fox

Australia

- Melbourne Cup – Merriwee

Canada

- Queen's Plate – Butter Scotch

Ireland

- Irish Grand National – Princess Hilda
- Irish Derby Stakes – Oppressor

USA

- Kentucky Derby – Manuel
- Preakness Stakes – Half Time
- Belmont Stakes – Hindus

== Ice hockey ==
Stanley Cup

- 15–18 February — Montreal Victorias wins its fifth Stanley Cup, defeating Winnipeg Victorias in a Cup challenge
- 4 March — Montreal Shamrocks wins the inaugural Canadian Amateur Hockey League (CAHL) championship and takes the Stanley Cup
- 14 March — Montreal Shamrocks successfully defends the title in a Cup challenge by Queen's College of Kingston, Ontario, winning 6–2.

== Motor racing ==
Tour de France Trail

- The Tour de France Trail is held 16–24 July over a distance of 2172.5 km. The winner is René De Knyff driving a Panhard-Levassor in a time of 44:43:39. The race is sometimes referred to in retrospect as the IV Grand Prix de l'A.C.F.
- In July, James Gordon Bennett Jr. establishes the Gordon Bennett Cup challenge series. It is run 1900–1905.
- In October The Empire of Austria holds its first motor race, won in Vienna by Baron Theodor von Liebig.

== Rowing ==
The Boat Race

- 25 March — Cambridge wins the 56th Oxford and Cambridge Boat Race

== Rugby league ==
England

- Championship – not contested
- Challenge Cup final – Oldham 19–9 Hunslet at Fallowfield Stadium, Manchester
- Lancashire League Championship – Broughton Rangers
- Yorkshire League Championship – Batley

== Rugby union ==
Home Nations Championship

- 17th Home Nations Championship series is won by Ireland

== Speed skating ==
Speed Skating World Championships

- Men's All-round Champion – Peder Østlund (Norway)

== Tennis ==
Events

- 18 September — Cincinnati Open starts. Today, it is the oldest tennis tournament in the United States still played in its original city, and is now known as the Western & Southern Financial Group Masters & Women's Open. The first singles champions are Nat Emerson and Myrtle McAteer.

England

- Wimbledon Men's Singles Championship – Reginald Doherty (GB) defeats Arthur Gore (GB) 1–6 4–6 6–3 6–3 6–3
- Wimbledon Women's Singles Championship – Blanche Bingley Hillyard (GB) defeats Charlotte Cooper Sterry (GB) 6–2 6–3

France

- French Men's Singles Championship – Paul Aymé (France) defeats Paul Lebreton (France): details unknown
- French Women's Singles Championship – Françoise Masson (France) wins: details unknown

USA

- American Men's Singles Championship – Malcolm Whitman (USA) defeats J. Parmly Paret (USA) 6–1 6–2 3–6 7–5
- American Women's Singles Championship – Marion Jones (USA) defeats Maud Banks (USA) 6–1 6–1 7–5

== Yacht racing ==
America's Cup

- The New York Yacht Club retains the America's Cup as Columbia defeats British challenger Shamrock, of the Royal Ulster Yacht Club, 3 races to 0
