= Broadcasting of sports events =

Coverage of sports on radio and television

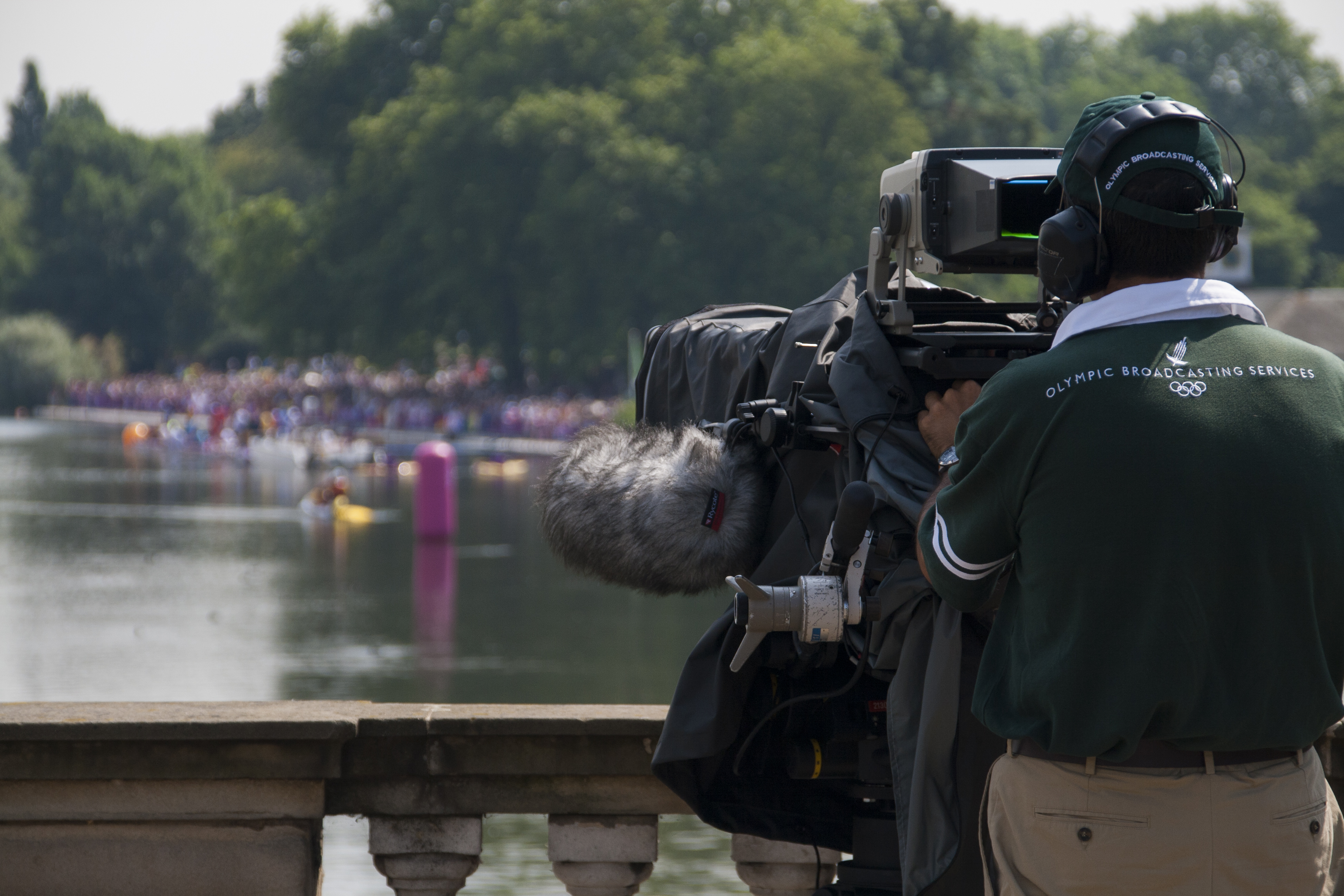
A cameraman from the Olympic Broadcasting Services covering the men's 10 kilometre marathon swim at the 2012 Olympic Games in the Serpentine at Hyde Park

The broadcasting of sports events (also known as a sportscast) is the live coverage of sports as a television program, on radio, and other broadcasting media. It usually involves one or more sports commentators describing events as they happen.

== Overview ==
Sportscasters usually work in a booth or a set, whether in radio or television studio. Sports broadcasting is an extremely time sensitive job, primarily seen by play by play commentators who cannot miss any action due to their role in the broadcast. Sports broadcasters have a variety of sections throughout the broadcast to deliver footage Sports casting is a big industry throughout the United States and worldwide. In addition, sports broadcasters must research the game's history, historical context, and statistics, something that is critical in making the games engaging and entertaining.

== History ==
Perhaps the first sports broadcast was by Guglielmo Marconi, who broadcast the 1899 America's Cup from New York Harbor. The first ever prerecorded sportscast occurred in 1911 in Kansas. The first recording had a group of people recreate plays of a football game, that were trying to learn of a play via telegraph, but wasn't official because no one was present. Ten years later in 1921 in Pittsburgh, Pennsylvania, the first radio broadcasting event occurred of a boxing match. Then the first live televised sporting event occurred on June 3, 1931, the Epsom Derby in the UK. In 1951, the first sports color telecast was a baseball game between the Brooklyn Dodgers and Boston Braves. As years went by more options were given to the public and the more popular sports broadcasting became. The first voice broadcasters happened, live broadcasting happened, and professional broadcasting happened. More media options became available to the public whether it be on newspapers, radio, or television.

As the number of people tuning in increased, so did the availability of where to hear and watch the broadcasts. Sports broadcasting also had an impact to the rise of American citizens being interested in being entertained. As more demand occurred from more sports broadcasters, the programing networks got more advanced with the technology as well.

== By country ==
=== Australia ===
Adelaide radio station 5KA was among the first stations to cover sports when it was first licensed in 1926. The popularity of its horse racing coverage brought growth and revenue to Australian radio. However, national relays of sporting events were limited to only those of utmost importance or impact, owing to limitations in Australian infrastructure compared to that of Canada, the United States, and the United Kingdom. The Postmaster-General's Department coordinated the broadcast of national programmes.

ABV, the Australian Broadcasting Corporation's station in Melbourne, began transmission on 19 November 1956. It televised the 1956 Summer Olympics, the first such Games to originate from Australia, three days later. Colour TV broadcasts to the general public began in May 1973, with a rugby league match covered by the ABC.

Presently, sports programming in Australia is distributed on both free-to-air channels, such as ABC TV, Seven Network, and Nine Network; and pay television channels, such as Fox Sports and ESPN Australia. Broadcasting of culturally significant events, including, but not limited to, sporting events, is subject to anti-siphoning rules.

=== Canada ===
Broadcasting of sports started with descriptions of play sent via telegraph in the 1890s. In 1896, a telegraph line was connected to the Victoria Rink in Montreal to update fans in Winnipeg of the Stanley Cup challenge series between Montreal and Winnipeg ice hockey teams. In 1923, the first radio broadcast of an ice hockey game took place on 8 February, with the broadcast of the third period of a game between Midland and North Toronto of the Ontario Hockey Association. Later that month, the first full-game broadcast took place in Winnipeg. That same season, hockey broadcasting pioneer Foster Hewitt made his first broadcast.

In 1933, Hewitt called an olympic games-wide radio broadcast of an NHL game between the Detroit Red Wings and the Toronto Maple Leafs. Always starting the broadcast with "Hello, Canada, and hockey fans in the United States and Newfoundland!"; this phrase stuck around (albeit without the "Newfoundland" portion after the dominion confederated into Canada in 1949) all the way to CBC's first national television broadcast (the first actual broadcast was on closed-circuit in Maple Leaf Gardens in Spring 1952) of Hockey Night in Canada in October 1952. Today it is consistently among the highest-rated programs in Canada.

Broadcasting of the Canadian Football League has been a fixture of Canadian television since the CBC's debut in 1952. From 1962 (one year after the debut of CTV) through 2007, there were two separate CFL contracts: one for CBC, and one for CTV (or a sister channel such as cable outlet TSN). Terrestrial television broadcasts of CFL games ended in 2008, when TSN acquired exclusive TV rights to the league.

American sports broadcasts are widely available in Canada, both from Canadian stations and from border blasters in the United States. In order to protect Canadian broadcasters' advertising, broadcast stations can invoke simultaneous substitution: any cable or satellite feed of an American station broadcasting the same program as a Canadian broadcast station must be blacked out and replaced by the Canadian feed. This rule is part of the reason the NFL, which is broadcast on terrestrial television in the United States but has no direct presence in Canada, is also broadcast on terrestrial TV in Canada, while the CFL no longer is (the CFL is broadcast only on cable in the United States); the simultaneous substitution benefits are not extended to cable stations. For the purposes of regional sports broadcasting, the Toronto Blue Jays and Toronto Raptors both claim all of Canada as their "territory", allowing Blue Jays and Raptors games to be broadcast nationwide.

=== Ireland ===
The first live commentary on a field sport anywhere in Europe was when Paddy Mehigan covered the All-Ireland Hurling Semi-Final between Kilkenny and Galway on 29 August 1926. This game is credited with being the first mainly because the BBC was prevented from broadcasting sporting events before 7.00pm as a means of protecting British newspaper sales. Originally there was no sports department for Irish radio. Gaelic Games and live commentary were very popular with Irish radio. One prominent figure was Seán Óg Ó Ceallacháin who broadcast for the Gaelic Games and live commentary weekly beginning in 1930. Many sports were covered in Irish broadcasting including Bridge tournaments.

=== United Kingdom ===
==== Radio ====
The first sports event broadcast on radio in Europe was a boxing contest for the Flyweight Championship of Great Britain and Europe between Elky Clark of Scotland and Kid Socks of England. relayed from the National Sporting Club in London on 26 February 1926. Further boxing commentaries were broadcast by the BBC on 29 March 1926, a British featherweight title defence by Johnny Curley, and 6 October 1927, when Teddy Baldock lost his claim to the British version of the World bantamweight title to South African Willie Smith.

The first outdoor sports event broadcast in the United Kingdom was a Rugby Union international between England and Wales, broadcast from Twickenham in January 1927. Two weeks later the first broadcast of a football match took place, with the BBC covering Arsenal's league fixture against Sheffield United at Highbury. Listeners to the broadcast could use numbered grids published in the Radio Times in order to ascertain in which area of the pitch (denoted as "squares") the action was taking place due to a second commentator reading out grid references during the match.

The BBC broadcasts almost all major sports events. Initially broadcast as a MW opt-out on BBC Radio 2, The launch of Radio 5 in 1990 saw a huge increase in the level of coverage on BBC Radio. Radio 5 became BBC Radio 5 Live in 1994 and the station, which combines live news and sport, provides round-the-clock coverage of sport through both live commentary and sports news and discussion. Live cricket commentary is broadcast on 5 Live's digital sports channel BBC 5 Sports Extra. This includes cricket coverage which is also aired on the long wave frequencies of BBC Radio 4.

BBC Local Radio provides extensive coverage of sport, giving more exposure to second-tier football clubs which would otherwise receive limited national coverage.

The BBC's main commercial rival is Talksport, but this has not acquired anywhere near as many exclusive contracts as Sky Sports and instead dedicates much of its airtime to sports discussions and phone-ins.

==== TV ====
The first sporting event to be televised in the UK was the Epsom Derby on June 3, 1931. Other early broadcasts include an international boxing tournament between England and Ireland from Alexandra Palace on 4 February 1937.

The United Kingdom saw the first live television broadcast of a football match, with the BBC showing 20 minutes of a specially arranged fixture between Arsenal and Arsenal Reserves on 17 September 1937.

The British media is dominated by national outlets, with local media playing a much smaller role. Traditionally the BBC played a dominant role in televising sport, providing extensive high-quality advertisement free coverage and free publicity in exchange for being granted broadcast rights for low fees. ITV broadcast a smaller portfolio of events, and Channel 4 broadcast a few events from the 1980s, mainly horse races and so-called "minority sports". In the early 1990s this arrangement was shaken up by the arrival of pay-TV in the form of BSkyB and its sports channel Sky Sports. Their dedicated sports channels have since become the only place for some major sports to be seen. Starting in 2006, the Irish company Setanta Sports emerged as a challenger to Sky Sports' dominance of the British pay-TV sports market; however, Setanta's UK channel went into bankruptcy administration and off the air in 2009. Between 2009 and 2013 ESPN made an attempt to challenge Sky Sports before its British operations were bought out by Sky's current main competitor, TNT Sports; a joint venture between former national telecommunications monopoly BT Group and Warner Bros. Discovery. There is also a dedicated UK version of Eurosport, called British Eurosport, and Viaplay Sports, which replaced Premier Sports in 2022, also broadcasts live and recorded sports coverage.

=== United States ===
National and local media both serve major roles in broadcasting sports in the United States. Depending on the league and event, telecasts are often shown live on network television (traditionally on weekends and during major events — either national through a television network, or in some cases, regionally syndicated by an operation such as Raycom Sports or a team), and nationally available cable channels (such as ESPN or Fox Sports 1). In some leagues (such as the NHL and the NBA), events are also primarily shown by regional sports networks groups (such as Fox Sports Networks), networks which air telecasts for teams of local interest, which are usually only carried within the relevant market. Additionally, cable channels also exist that are dedicated to specific types of sports, certain college sports conferences, or a specific league. Pay-per-view broadcasts are typically restricted to combat sports such as boxing, mixed martial arts or professional wrestling.

Radio broadcasts are extensive. The national leagues each have national network coverage of league high games in addition to local radio coverage originating with each team, with ESPN Radio and WestwoodOne controlling national rights to the major team sports and the motorsports circuits operating their own networks. Local radio broadcasts cover a wide variety of sports, ranging from the majors to local school and recreational leagues.

Internet broadcasts are also common, though college and major professional sports either use a pay wall or subscriber-based systems such as TV Everywhere to extract payment. Telephone broadcasts are rare, although a few companies provide the service.

==== History ====
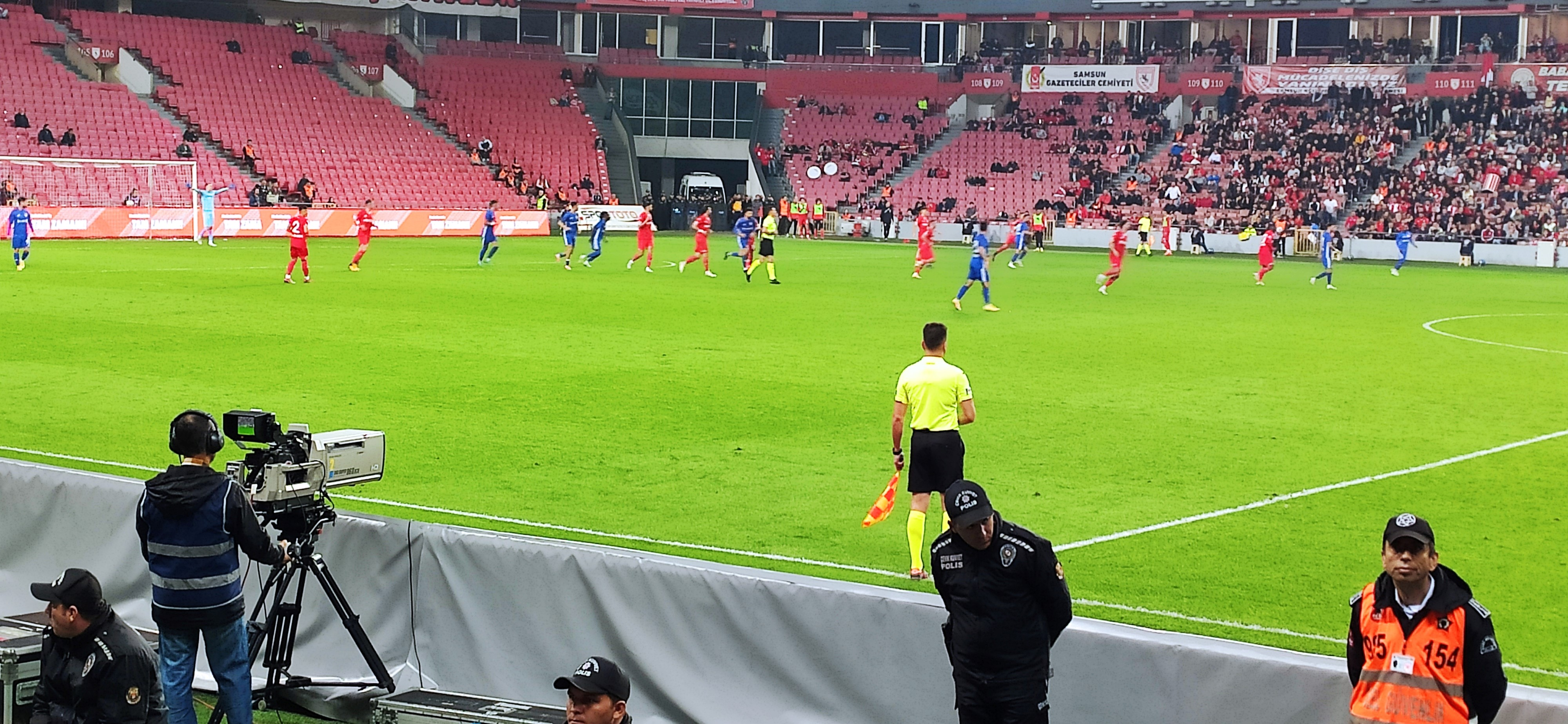
A camera broadcasting on behalf of broadcaster TRT during a TFF First League match

In 1911, more than 1,000 people gathered in downtown Lawrence, Kansas to watch a mechanical reproduction of the 1911 Kansas vs. Missouri football game while it was being played. A Western Union telegraph wire was set up direct from Columbia, Missouri. A group of people then would announce the results of the previous play and used a large model of a football playing field to show the results. Those in attendance cheered as though they were watching the game live, including the school's legendary Rock Chalk, Jayhawk cheer. This was followed on Thanksgiving 1919 by the first true broadcast (as opposed to the 1911 point-to-point transmission) of a college football game, over 5XB, the experimental station that eventually became WTAW; that year's Lone Star Shootout was, as with the Kansas/Missouri game, distributed in telegraph code but was open to anyone listening to the station.

The first voice broadcast of a sporting event took place on April 11, 1921 when Westinghouse station KDKA in Pittsburgh, Pennsylvania broadcast a 10-round, no decision boxing match between Johnny Dundee and Johnny Ray at Pittsburgh's Motor Square Garden. The event was reported by Florent Gibson, the first sports broadcaster.

The first radio broadcast of a baseball game occurred on August 5, 1921 over KDKA from Pittsburgh's Forbes Field. Harold W. Arlin announced a game between the Pittsburgh Pirates and the Philadelphia Phillies. Two months later, on October 8, 1921, from the same Forbes Field, Arlin announced the first live radio broadcast of a college football game on KDKA when he gave the play-by-play action of the University of Pittsburgh victory over West Virginia University.

On May 17, 1939, the United States' first televised sporting event, a college baseball game between the Columbia Lions and Princeton Tigers, was broadcast by NBC from Columbia's Baker Field. (The world's first live televised sporting event had been the 1936 Summer Olympics in Berlin.) On September 30, 1939, the first American football game, a college contest between Fordham and Waynesburg College was broadcast on television. The first nationwide broadcast of college football, which was also the first live sporting event seen coast-to-coast, was a game between Duke University and the University of Pittsburgh that was televised by NBC on September 29, 1951. The broadcasting of college football games on television in the United States has been a fixture of the major networks on a continuous basis since that time. The NCAA severely restricted broadcasts of college football from the 1950s until a judge ruled that the action was a violation of antitrust rules in 1984, which allowed for a much greater expansion of college football broadcasting.

NBC broadcast the first televised National Football League (NFL) game when they carried the October 22, 1939 game between the Philadelphia Eagles and the Brooklyn Dodgers. The same year, the first nationwide radio broadcast of an NFL championship game was carried on the Mutual Broadcasting System. While the NFL had weak television deals that ranked behind college football and even the Canadian Football League in the 1950s, the broadcast rights of the NFL would go on to become an important property following the 1958 NFL Championship and the later establishment of the American Football League in 1960. Monday Night Football, NFL on Fox, and NBC Sunday Night Football have changed the landscape of American football broadcasts, including the scheduling of the Super Bowl, transforming it from an afternoon broadcast into a primetime spectacle. The price for the NFL's broadcast rights has increased steadily over the past several decades, in part because of bidding wars between the numerous networks and the fear of losing stature due to the loss of NFL programming; as of the most recent contract the league nets annual fees of over $6 billion, or half of the league's overall revenue, from television rights alone. Four of the five major sports television units in the United States, and the four companies that control all of the major broadcast networks, currently own some NFL rights.

NBC also broadcast an NHL game in 1940; the league would briefly air games in the 1950s, but due to a dispute over how much of the rights fee money the players would receive (and difficulties programming around the two Canadian teams in the league at the time), the NHL refused to televise its games in the United States for six years in the 1960s. For this reason, as well as the regional nature of the sport, televised NHL games have struggled to gain a foothold on American television for the past several decades, trailing the other leagues in ratings. After several decades of bouncing around various networks (and a stretch from 1975 to 1994 when the league had no permanent broadcast partner), the NHL established a stable broadcast partner in 2004, when NBC and what was then Outdoor Life Network (now NBCSN) took over NHL broadcast rights; they have since renewed those rights through 2021.

The first-ever television broadcast of a basketball game occurred on February 28, 1940 when the University of Pittsburgh defeated Fordham at Madison Square Garden on NBC station W2XBS. Professional basketball has been aired on television since 1953, shortly after the founding of the National Basketball Association, and has been aired on television ever since. College basketball, on the other hand, was much later in gaining a television foothold. Although the NCAA Tournament has aired since 1962, it was not until the mid-1970s that regular-season college basketball games would air on major network television.

Outside of the networks, the only other source for national sports television was through early syndication networks. Sports Network Incorporated (SNI), later renamed the Hughes Television Network, carried Cleveland Browns (NFL) games in the 1950s and NHL games in the late 1970s, after the NHL lost its contract with NBC. TVS Television Network helped popularize the broadcasts of college basketball and also gave an outlet to the short-lived World Football League. Mizlou Television Network earned a reputation for carrying a large number of college football bowl games in an era when televised college football was highly restricted. Modern syndication networks still exist for sporting events, such as Raycom Sports and American Sports Network, both of which specialize in college sports.

The debut of ESPN in 1979 revolutionized the broadcasting of sports events. Within several years of ESPN's founding as a basic cable channel, it had developed a stable of sports broadcasts ranging from major leagues to oddities. ESPN has since grown into a massive multiplexed network, with several channels and a large news bureau that has led to the network bestowing the title of "Worldwide Leader in Sports" upon itself. Cable, and later digital cable and satellite, greatly expanded the number of channels (and, by extension, the room for broadcasting sports events) available on a given set, and also gave channels such as ESPN the ability to broadcast direct and nationwide, as opposed to dealing with local affiliates. Syndication networks gave way to regional sports networks, which carried broadcasts of local sports on a far greater scale than full-service broadcast stations could provide at the time; these combined with out-of-market sports packages (which debuted in the 1990s) allowed the carriage of these networks' sporting events across the country. However, with the increased availability of sports to broadcast came increasing rights fees, which could be recovered by the newly authorized practice of collecting retransmission consent fees from cable subscribers, which has led to numerous disputes and the dropping of channels from cable lineups. Individual leagues began launching their own networks in the 2000s; specialty networks of other sports have had varying levels of success.

One of the first live high-definition sports broadcasts in the U.S. took place in September 1998 in which a football game between Ohio State and West Virginia, aired on WBNS-TV. The station claims this to have been the first locally produced HD broadcast in the U.S.; however, as several other stations throughout the country also lay claim to this distinction, the veracity cannot be verified. It is widely considered the first ever live sports game in HD in the U.S. produced using a production truck and transmission vehicle from NHK, Japan's national public broadcasting organization.

The Internet has also allowed greater broadcasting of sports events, both in video and audio forms and through free and subscription channels. With an Internet broadcast, even a locally broadcast high school football game can be heard worldwide on any device with an audio output and an Internet connection. Individual leagues (including major ones) all have subscription services that allow subscribers to watch their sporting events for a fee.

One of the first live sporting events in the U.S. to be streamed was the Ohio State spring football game in 2001 by WBNS-TV. The game was delivered on RealVideo, a compressed video format, on the RealPlayer media player platform on the station's website. It also was distributed to Windows Mobile mobile devices using the Windows Media Player format, including Compaq's IPAQ personal digital assistant which required an ExpressCard to connect to the Internet.

== Rights and contracts ==
Broadcasting rights and contracts limit who can show footage of the event.

In the United Kingdom, Sky UK based its early marketing largely on its acquisition of the broadcast rights of the top division of the English league football, which as part of the deal with The Football Association broke away from The Football League to become the Premier League. This prevented the footage of any major Premier League football game being shown on free-to-air television until much later that evening as highlights, something the European Commission disapproved of. Following warnings of legal action to stop the monopoly, an announcement was made that an alternative structure would be in place when the contract ended in 2007.

In the United States, team sports are broadcast by networks usually only in "game of the week" or championship situations, except for the NFL (see NFL on television) and motorsport. Other sports are broadcast by sports channels, and are limited by who can view them based on various rules set by the leagues themselves, resulting in blackouts. These limitations can be legally overlooked by purchasing out-of-market sports packages, such as MLB Extra Innings or NFL Sunday Ticket. Regular season games involving local teams (except the NFL) may also be viewed on those local stations or regional sports channels that have a contract to broadcast that team's games.

Events that have been described as "the most watched" per various definitions include the FIFA World Cup, Summer Olympic Games, Cricket World Cup, UEFA Champions League, UEFA European Championship, FA Cup, Tour de France, Rugby World Cup (rugby union), State Of Origin (rugby league), Indian Premier League, Wimbledon, NBA Finals, Stanley Cup, Super Bowl, World Series, and the FIA Formula One World Championship.

TV Rights of the UEFA Champions League, per country. Season 2009-2010, according to FootBiz.

- United Kingdom: €179 million
- Italy: €98 million
- Spain: €91 million
- Germany: €85 million
- France: €52 million
- Croatia: €28 million
- Poland: €8.1 million
- North America: €3.5 million
- Belgium: €2.9 million
- India: €2.9 million
- Australia: €2.9 million
- Ireland: €2 million

=== Anti-siphoning laws ===
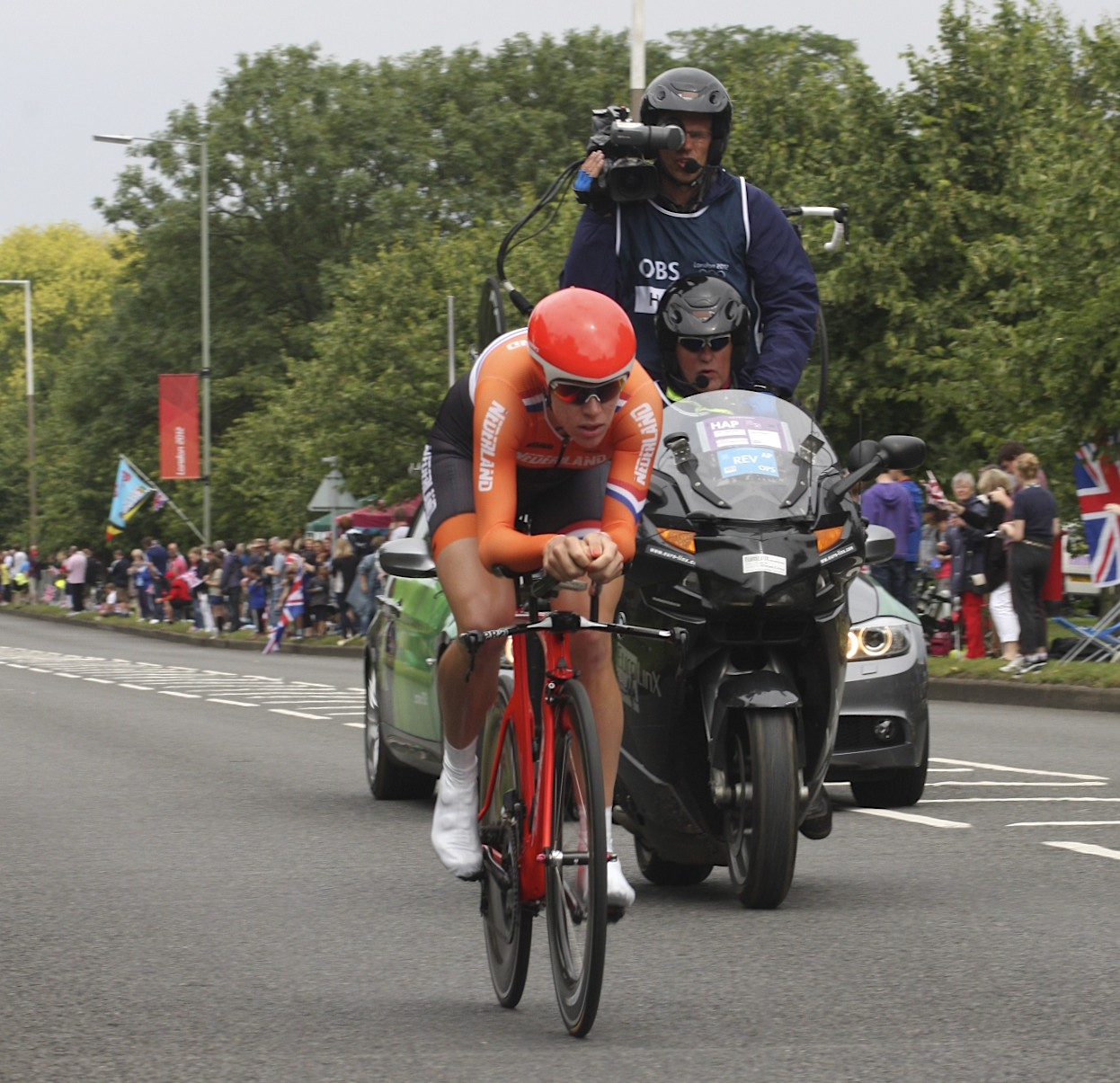
Ellen van Dijk filmed from a motor during the 2012 Summer Olympics

In some countries, broadcast regulations referred to as "anti-siphoning laws" exist in order to ensure that coverage of major sporting events of national importance—often covering major events such as the Olympics, FIFA World Cup, and national team events in culturally-significant sports—are available on free-to-air, terrestrial television, rather than exclusively on pay television. Some larger events (particularly the Olympics) may be covered under rules allowing a portion of the event to be televised by a pay TV partner if a specific minimum of coverage is broadcast free-to-air, or if an extended highlights package is available on a delay to a free-to-air broadcaster.

In the United States, the Federal Communications Commission attempted to introduce similar restrictions on cable broadcasts of specific sporting events and recent films as to not cannibalize broadcast TV. In 1977, these restrictions were deemed to be invalid when a federal district court ruled that the FCC did not have the authority to make such decisions in a consolidated case, also noting that the constitutional basis for such a law had not been proven. No such laws have been passed since. Since then, sports have been a lucrative source of revenue in the U.S. pay television industry, including mainstream networks such as ESPN, as well as channels devoted to specific sports, leagues, and college sports conferences. These networks receive revenue from both advertising and carriage fees charged to television providers (and passed onto consumers as part of the cost of service), and can provide an outlet for expanded coverage of "niche" events with dedicated audiences.

By the mid-2000s and early 2010s, most major U.S. sports leagues (barring the National Football League, which has historically stipulated that all games be shown on terrestrial television in at least the markets of the teams involved) had begun to steadily decrease their presence on broadcast television, and allow more of their content (including post-season coverage in many cases) to air on cable networks, and more recently, digital-only outlets. The NCAA Division I men's basketball tournament and national championship games in college football have also largely moved to cable (since 2016, the semi-finals of the former only air on broadcast television in odd-numbered years).

A similar phenomenon has taken root in much of Canadian sports, where the Canadian Football League left broadcast television in 2008, not to return again until 2024. The National Hockey League survives on Canadian broadcast television because Rogers Sportsnet, the cable broadcaster that acquired exclusive rights to the league in 2014, offers two weekly games to CBC Television for free to allow the network to continue the long-running Hockey Night in Canada. The CFL's return to broadcast television was part of a broader trend away from cable television and toward over-the-air options, as the NFL had made more of its Monday Night Football games available on broadcast television in the two years leading up to the CFL's decision, and additional plans have the College Football Playoff National Championship Game returning to broadcast in 2027.

In Australia, per the Broadcasting Services Act 1992, the Minister is empowered to select events, including sporting events, that they believe in their opinion should be televised to the general public for free. These events compose the anti-siphoning list, which started in 2006. Free-to-air national broadcasters receive first priority to obtain the broadcasting rights to events in the anti-siphoning list, but pay television outlets may obtain the rights to events on the list if free-to-air providers decline to purchase the rights before 12 weeks prior to the event.

== Dedicated sports channels ==
=== Team-owned channels ===
Several sports teams in the United States have their own channels, or own shares in other sports networks. For example, the Boston Red Sox and Boston Bruins own New England Sports Network, which retains the New England area television broadcast rights for the majority of Red Sox games (except nationally televised games). The New York Mets own SportsNet New York jointly with Comcast and Time Warner Cable. Madison Square Garden has its own network as well, MSG, where they broadcast New York Rangers, New York Knicks, New York Islanders and high school sports games, as well as original shows. Altitude airs games of all Denver-based teams owned by Kroenke Sports Enterprises. Mid-Atlantic Sports Network is a partnership between the Washington Nationals and Baltimore Orioles.

The Longhorn Network, in which ESPN owned a stake, was even more specialized, designed as an outlet for the athletic program of the University of Texas at Austin (although it has also aired football games of the UT system's San Antonio campus).

Team-owned channels are also common in Europe, most notably Barça TV, Benfica TV, Galatasaray TV, Manchester United TV, Liverpool TV and Real Madrid TV.

== See also ==
- Sports journalism
- Category:United Kingdom sports broadcasting timelines
- Altcast

== Bibliography ==
- Hewitt, Foster (1967). Foster Hewitt, his own story. Ryerson Press.
- Kitchen, Paul (2008). Win, Tie or Wrangle: The Inside Story of the Old Ottawa Senators - 1883–1935. Manotick, Ontario: Penumbra Press. ISBN 978-1-897323-46-5.
