= 1899 Preakness Stakes =

24th running of the Preakness Stakes

24th Preakness Stakes
- Preakness Stakes
- Location: Gravesend Race Track, Coney Island, New York; United States
- Date: May 30, 1899
- Winning horse: Half Time
- Winning time: 1:47.00
- Jockey: Richard Clawson
- Trainer: Frank McCabe
- Owner: Philip J. Dwyer
- Conditions: Fast
- Surface: Dirt

The 1899 Preakness Stakes was the 24th running of the $1,000 added Preakness Stakes, a horse race for three-year-old Thoroughbreds run on May 30, 1899, at the Gravesend Race Track on Coney Island, New York. The mile and a sixteenth race was won by Half Time over runner-up Filigrane. The race was run on a track rated fast in a final time of 1:47 flat that equaled the Gravesend track record for the distance.

The 1899 Kentucky Derby was run on May 4 and the 1899 Belmont Stakes on May 25, five days before the Preakness. For jockey Richard Clawson, the win aboard Half Time was his second in the 1899 Classics having won the Belmont aboard Jean Bereaud in which he had defeated Half Time.

The 1919 Preakness Stakes would mark the first time the race would be recognized as the second leg of a U.S. Triple Crown series.

Finished	Post	Horse	Jockey	Trainer	Owner	Time / behind
1	1	Half Time	Richard Clawson	Frank McCabe	Philip J. Dwyer	1:47.00
2	2	Filigrane	Fred Littlefield	R. Wyndham Walden	A. H. & D. H. Morris	3/4
3	3	Lackland	Henry Spencer	A. Jack Joyner	August Belmont Jr.	5

- Winning Breeder: Walter Showalter (KY)
