= 1899 Belmont Stakes =

American horse race

33rd Belmont Stakes
- Belmont Stakes
- Location: Morris Park Racecourse; Morris Park, New York, U.S.A.
- Date: May 25, 1899
- Distance: 1 3/8 mi (11 furlongs; 2,213 m)
- Winning horse: Jean Bereaud
- Winning time: 2:23.00
- Jockey: Richard Clawson
- Trainer: Sam Hildreth
- Owner: Sydney Paget
- Conditions: Fast
- Surface: Dirt

The 1899 Belmont Stakes was the 33rd running of the Belmont Stakes. It was the 10th Belmont Stakes held at Morris Park Racecourse in Morris Park, New York, and was run on May 25, 1899. The race drew four starters and was won by favored Jean Bereaud whose winning time of 2:23 flat set a new Morris Park track record for 1 3/8 miles on dirt.

For future U.S. Racing Hall of Fame trainer Sam Hildreth, it was the first of his seven wins in the Belmont Stakes.

For jockey Richard Clawson, the win aboard Jean Bereaud was his first of two in the 1899 Classics as he went on to win in the Preakness aboard Half Time, the colt ridden by Skeets Martin who finished second in the Belmont.

The 1899 Kentucky Derby was run on May 4 and the 1899 Preakness Stakes on May 30, five days after the Belmont. The 1919 Belmont Stakes would mark the first time the race would be recognized as the third leg of a U.S. Triple Crown series.

== Results ==
Finished	Post	Horse	Jockey	Trainer	Owner	Time / behind	Win $
1	3	Jean Bereaud †	Richard Clawson	Sam Hildreth	Sydney Paget	1:47.00	$9,445
2	1	Half Time	Skeets Martin	Frank McCabe	Philip J. Dwyer	HD	
3	2	Glengar	Neville	William Jennings Sr.	William Jennings Sr.	10	
4	4	Filon d'Or	Fred Taral	John J. Hyland	John J. Hyland	3	

- † In the race program, winner Jean Bereaud's name was misspelled "Beraud"
- Winning breeder: David Gideon & John Daly (NJ)
