= Half Time (horse) =

American-bred Thoroughbred racehorse

- Sire: Hanover
- Grandsire: Hindoo
- Dam: Pandora
- Damsire: Rayon d'Or
- Sex: Stallion
- Foaled: 1896
- Country: United States
- Color: Chestnut
- Breeder: Walter Showalter
- Owner: Philip J. Dwyer
- Trainer: Frank McCabe

Major wins
- American Classics wins: Preakness Stakes (1899)

Half Time (foaled 1896) was an American Thoroughbred racehorse. Ridden by Richard Clawson, he won the 1899 Preakness Stakes and finished second in the 1899 Belmont Stakes under Skeets Martin. Half Time was gelded in 1899 and was sold to Louis V. Bell in July 1900 for $3750.
