= 1899 America's Cup =

10th America's Cup
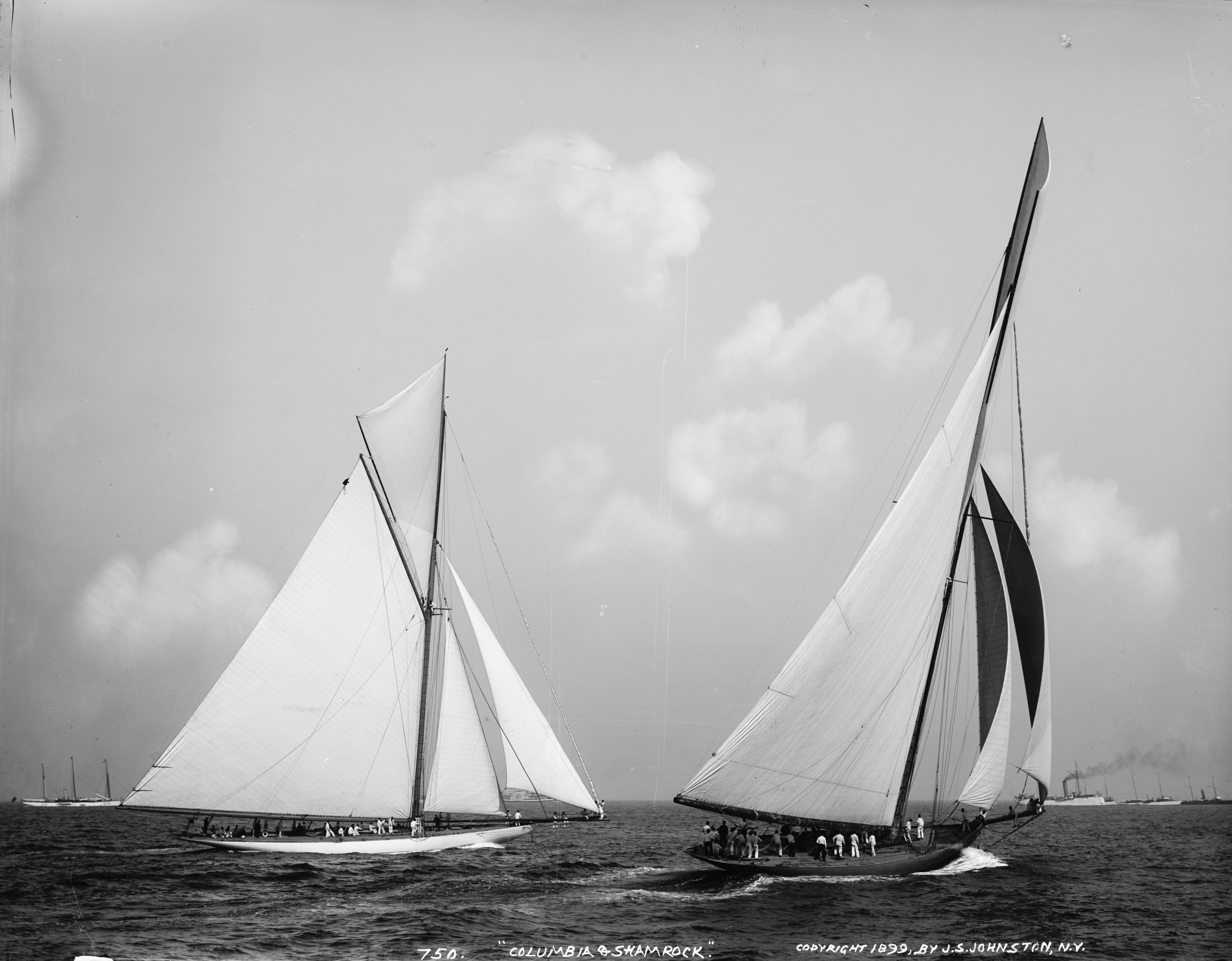
- Columbia (right) and Shamrock

Defender United States
- Defender club: New York Yacht Club
- Yacht: Columbia

Challenger United Kingdom
- Challenger club: Royal Ulster Yacht Club
- Yacht: Shamrock

Competition
- Location: New York Harbor
- 40°40′N 74°02′W
- Dates: 1899
- Rule: Seawanhaka
- Winner: New York Yacht Club
- Score: 3–0

The 1899 America's Cup was the 10th challenge for the Cup. It took place in the New York City harbor and consisted of a best of five series of races between the defender, Columbia, entered by the New York Yacht Club, and Sir Thomas Lipton's Shamrock, representing the Royal Ulster Yacht Club. Columbia won all three races against Shamrock.

Guglielmo Marconi transmitted the event on radio from New York Harbor, making the cup perhaps the first sports broadcasting.
