= 1899 World Allround Speed Skating Championships =

1899 Speed Skating Championship

World Allround Speed Skating Championships
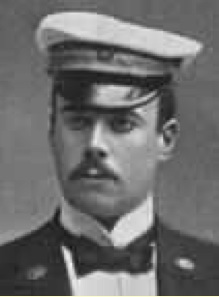
- Gustaf Estlander; Did not start the 1898 World Championship
- Venue: Friedenauer Sportplatz & Westeisbahn, Berlin, German Empire
- Dates: 4–5 February
- Competitors: 11 from 6 nations

Medalist men
1st place, gold medalist(s)		Peder Østlund	NOR

The 1899 World Allround Speed Skating Championships took place at 4 and 5 February 1899 at the ice rinks Friedenauer Sportplatz & Westeisbahn in Berlin, Germany. The first day was skated at the ice rink Friedenauer Sportplatz (a 400 m ice rink). Due to the bad ice conditions the second day the distances were skated at the ice rink Westeisbahn (a 335 m ice rink).

Peder Østlund, the defending champion, succeeded in defending his championship. He won three distances and became World champion.

== Allround results ==
Place	Athlete	Country	500m	5000m	1500m	10000m
1st place, gold medalist(s)	Peder Østlund	Norway	50.5 (1)	9:54.6 (1)	2:45.0 (1)	21:25.2 (3)
NC2	Johann Pichler	Austria	57.5 (4)	11:52.2 (4)	3:06.6 (3)	22:29.0 (5)
NC	F. Toklas	German Empire	1:20.2 (7)	13:40.4 (5)	3:52.0 (5)	NS
NC	Jan Greve	Netherlands	55.0 (3)	10:54.4 (2)	NF	20:36.2 (1)
NC	Rudolf Schindler	German Empire	1:05.0 (6)	13:51.4 (6)	NS	NS
NC	Julius Seyler	German Empire	51.5 (2)	NF	2:48.2 (2)	21:25.0 (2)
NC	Charles Edgington	United Kingdom	1:00.0 (5)	NS	3:12.4 (4)	21:50.2 (4)
NC	Nikolay Kryukov	Russia	NF	11:40.0 (3)	NS	DQ
NC	Gustaf Estlander	Finland	NS	NS	NS	NS
NC	F. Behne	German Empire	NS	NS	NS	NS
NC	Eduard Vollenvejder	Russia	NS	NS	NS	NS

* = Fell
NC = Not classified
NF = Not finished
NS = Not started
DQ = Disqualified

Source: SpeedSkatingStats.com

== Rules ==
Four distances have to be skated:

- 500m
- 1500m
- 5000m
- 10000m

One could only win the World Championships by winning at least three of the four distances, so there would be no World Champion if no skater won at least three distances.

Silver and bronze medals were not awarded.
