= Jean Bereaud =

American-bred Thoroughbred racehorse

- Jean Bereaud, before 1908.
- Sire: His Highness
- Grandsire: The Ill-Used
- Dam: Carrie C.
- Damsire: Sensation
- Sex: Stallion
- Foaled: 1896
- Country: United States
- Colour: Bay
- Breeder: David Gideon & John Daly
- Owner: 1) John Daly; 2) Sydney Paget
- Trainer: Sam Hildreth
- Record: 17: 10-2-0
- Earnings: US$80,952

Major wins
- Double Event Stakes (part 2) (1898); National Stallion Stakes (1898); Tremont Stakes (1898); Eclipse Stakes (1898); Hudson Stakes (1898); Great American Stakes (1898); Great Trial Stakes (1898); Withers Stakes (1899); Brookdale Handicap (1900) American Classics wins: Belmont Stakes (1899)

Awards
- American Champion Two-Year-Old Colt (1898)

Jean Bereaud (1896 – November 15, 1908) was an American Thoroughbred Champion racehorse best known for winning an 1899 American Classic Race, the Belmont Stakes.

== Background ==
He was bred by the partnership of David Gideon and John Daly at their Holmdel Stock Farm in Holmdel, New Jersey. His sire was His Highness who in 1891 became the first horse in American Thoroughbred racing history to win more than $100,000 in a single season. He was out of the mare Carrie C., who was described by The New York Times as "one of the best of the high-class platers of her day." Carrie C.'s sire was George Lorillard's undefeated colt, Sensation.

== Racing career ==
A top two-year-old, Jean Bereaud was conditioned for racing by future U.S. Racing Hall of Fame trainer Sam Hildreth. He was raced by John Daly until after his June 11, 1898, win in the Great American Stakes when he sold him to Sydney Paget, a transplanted Englishman who managed the racing operations of William Collins Whitney. For his new owner, the colt notably won the Great Trial Stakes and the second part of the Double Event at Sheepshead Bay Race Track. While Jean Bereaud's dominating performances diminished somewhat during the second half of 1898, he was still regarded as American Champion Two-Year-Old Colt.

As a three-year-old, Jean Bereaud rebounded from his slow second half of 1898 and in May 1899 won the 26th running of the Withers Stakes at Morris Park Racecourse. Then, in the pre-U.S. Triple Crown era, he set a new Morris Park track record of 2:23.00 for 1 3/8 miles (2.2 km) in winning the 1899 Belmont Stakes.

Racing at age four, Jean Bereaud's most significant race was a win in the Brookdale Handicap at Gravesend Race Track in which he defeated Imp.

== Stud record ==
Retired to stud duty, Jean Bereaud was not a successful sire. He died on November 15, 1908, at Horse Haven Farm in Lexington of "acute indigestion."
