= Shamrock (yacht) =

Racing Yacht

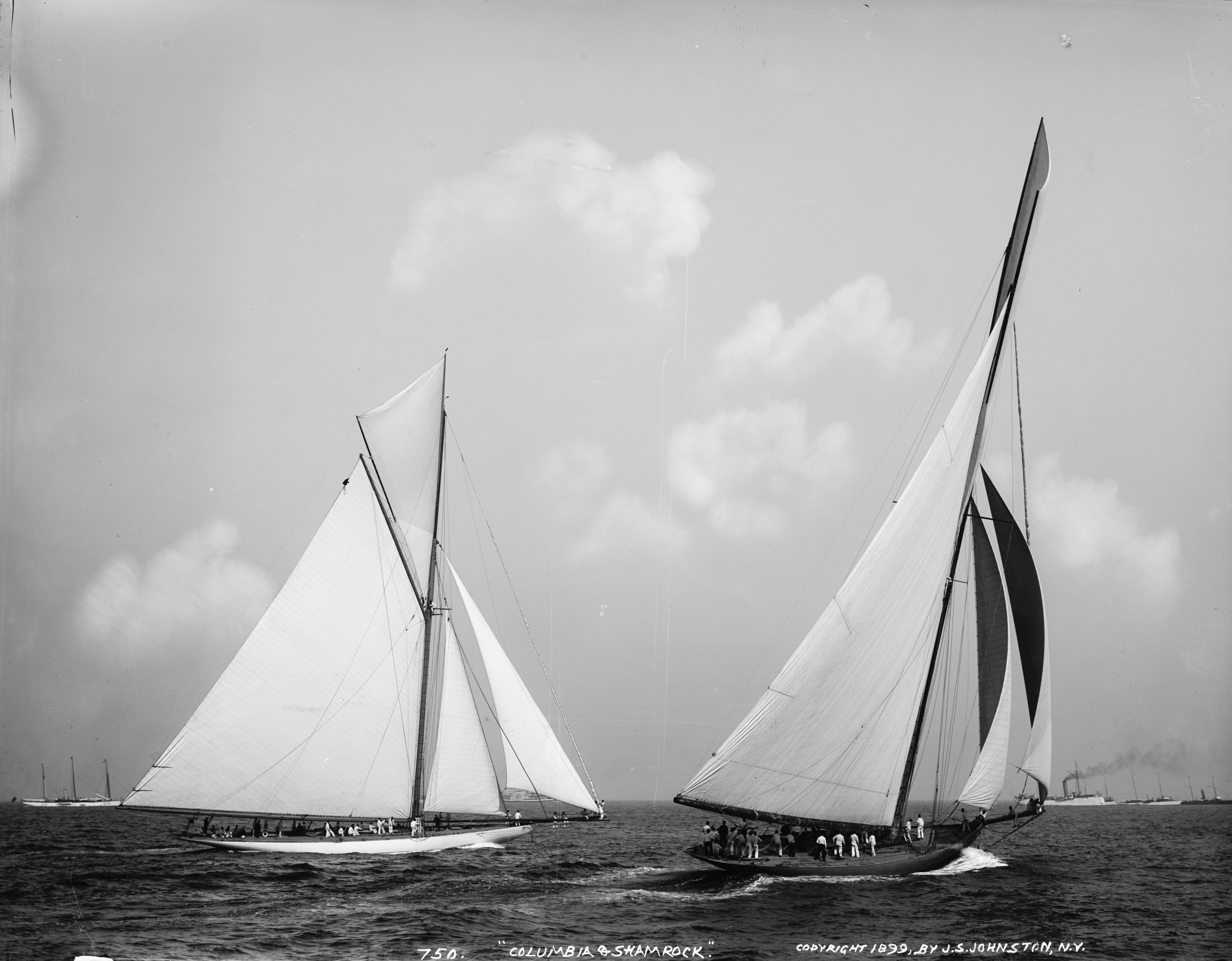
- Shamrock and Columbia in 1899
- Yacht club: Royal Ulster Yacht Club
- Nation: United Kingdom
- Designer(s): William Fife III
- Builder: J. Thorneycroft & Co.
- Launched: 26 June 1899
- Owner(s): Sir Thomas Lipton

Racing career
- Skippers: Captain Archibald "Archie" Hogarth
- America's Cup: 1899

Specifications
- Displacement: 156.9 metric tonnes
- Length: 38.86 m (127.5 ft) (LOA); 25.12 m (82.4 ft) (LWL)
- Beam: 7.46 m (24.5 ft)
- Draft: 6.15 m (20.2 ft)
- Sail area: 1,214.30 m^{2} (13,070.6 sq ft)

Shamrock was a racing yacht built in 1898 that was the unsuccessful Irish challenger for the 1899 America's Cup against the United States defender, Columbia.

== Design ==
Shamrock was designed by third-generation Scottish boatbuilder, William Fife III, and built in 1898 by J. Thorneycroft & Co., at Church Wharf, Chiswick, for owner Sir Thomas Lipton of the Royal Ulster Yacht Club (and also of Lipton Tea fame). However her draft was too great for construction at Chiswick and she was built at Millwall.

Shamrock (also known as Shamrock I, to distinguish her from her successors) was built in 1898 under a shroud of secrecy, and christened by Lady Russell of Killowen at its launch on 26 June 1899. Shamrock featured a composite build, with manganese-bronze bottom and aluminium topside clinkerbuilt over a steel frame and a pine decking.

== Career ==
She was initially skippered by Captain Archibald Hogarth.

During her trials she raced against the 1895 America's Cup challenger, Valkyrie III, as well as twice beating the Prince of Wales yacht Britannia in regattas on the Solent. She sailed to New York for the America's Cup race in the summer of 1899. The Cup defender Columbia beat Shamrock in all three races. She returned to Britain in the autumn of 1899, towed by Lipton's steam yacht, Erin. She was subsequently refitted to serve as a trial horse for Shamrock II and Shamrock III.
