= Anti-siphoning law =

Law to prevent pay-TV monopoly over broadcasting culturally significant events

Anti-siphoning laws and regulations are designed to prevent pay television and pay streaming broadcasters from buying monopoly rights to televise important and culturally significant events before free-to-air television has a chance to bid on them. The theory is that if such a monopoly was allowed, then those unable or unwilling to obtain access to the pay television service would be unable to view the important and culturally significant events. Generally the laws allow pay-TV to bid for such monopoly rights only if free-to-air television has declined to bid on them.

Notable examples of such policies are present in Australia and the United Kingdom. Anti-siphoning in the United States was introduced by the FCC in 1975 and was soon overturned as unconstitutional. Some sports leagues do contractually obligate that their broadcasters include a certain number of telecasts on over-the-air television as part of their overall contracts. For games broadcast exclusively by pay television channels, the National Football League similarly requires syndicated, over-the-air simulcasts in the markets of the teams involved, to ensure that all of a team's games are available locally on broadcast television.

== Australia ==
Anti-siphoning laws in Australia cover specific listed events, such as all Olympic Games and the Commonwealth Games, the FIFA World Cup, Rugby World Cup, and Rugby League World Cup finals, events in major sports (such as association football, cricket, and rugby tests) that involve Australian senior national teams or are hosted by Australia, and culturally-significant events such as the Australian Football League and National Rugby League premierships, the State of Origin series, most matches in the Australian Open, the Melbourne Cup horse race, the Bathurst 1000, the Australian Grand Prix, and the Australian Motorcycle Grand Prix among others.

== Germany ==
Anti-siphoning law in Germany is contained in Article 1, Section 13 of the State Treaty on Media, as most recently amended in December 2025. Protected events must be broadcast on a "generally accessible" television broadcaster. "Generally accessible" is defined as those which are receivable unencrypted and without additional payment (i.e., beyond the necessary equipment) in two-thirds of households. If a broadcaster which does not satisfy these conditions acquires the rights to a protected event, it is required to offer a simulcast to a generally accessible broadcaster. In this case, a brief delay of the simulcast is permissible if there are technical or scheduling constraints, such as multiple events running in parallel.

This protected status applies to the following events:

- All events and ceremonies of the Summer Olympic Games and Winter Olympic Games;
- all games of the Germany national football team;
- the opening game, semi-finals and final of the FIFA World Cup and UEFA European Championship, regardless of participating teams;
- the semi-finals and final of the DFB-Pokal;
- the final of the UEFA Champions League and UEFA Europa League if a German team is participating.

Any modification to this list can only be made by amending the treaty through unanimous agreement among the states.

This in effect blocks protected events from exclusive broadcast on pay TV or paid Internet streaming providers such as Sky Sport or Telekom Deutschland's Magenta Sport. A broadcast is not required to be on terrestrial television to be considered generally accessible – for example, free Internet streaming of individual Olympic events by ARD and ZDF is acceptable, and major commercial channel RTL, whose terrestrial broadcasts are encrypted, is eligible to broadcast Germany national football team matches through its nationwide availability on free-to-air satellite.

== India ==
Indian law requires all sporting events of "national importance", whose broadcast rights are owned by a pay television service, to be simulcast by the state broadcaster Doordarshan (DD) on its DD National TV channel. Tata Sky (which, at the time of the lawsuit, was partly owned by 21st Century Fox, the parent company of Star India which owns the Star Sports networks) filed a lawsuit over the rule, arguing that these simulcasts devalued its exclusive rights to these events because DD National is a must-carry channel. In 2017, the Supreme Court of India ruled that pay television services must black out DD National when it is airing such events in order to protect the pay TV broadcaster, restricting availability of DD's simulcasts of such events to terrestrial television and DD Free Dish.

== Ireland ==
Section 162 of the Broadcasting Act 2009 entitles the Minister for Culture, Communications and Sport to designate sporting or other major events as events of major importance to society. The effect of such a designation is that the event must be available on a "qualifying broadcaster", which currently comprises RTÉ, Virgin Media TV, or TG4. A holder of exclusive rights which is not a qualifying broadcaster is obliged to sell such rights to a qualifying broadcaster or refrain from broadcasting the event itself. As of 2017, the list of designated events is:

- The Summer Olympics
- The all-Ireland senior football and hurling finals
- Ireland's matches in the FIFA World Cup and UEFA European Football Championship, and their respective qualifying tournaments; as well as the opening matches, the semi-finals, and the finals of those tournaments
- Ireland's matches in the Rugby World Cup
- The Irish Grand National and Irish Derby in horse racing
- The FEI Nations Cup at the Dublin Horse Show
- Ireland's matches in the Six Nations Championship (designated for deferred coverage, although in practice shown live)

== Italy ==
Due to the 8/99 "List of particularly relevant events for society to broadcast on free-to-air television channels" deliberation of 9 March 1999, published on the Gazzetta Ufficiale on 24 May 1999, the following events must be broadcast for free, even partially, delayed or their highlights:

- Olympic Games (winter and summer)
- Every game played by the Italy national football team
- FIFA World Cup final (live compulsory)
- UEFA European Championship final (live compulsory)
- Semi-finals and final of UEFA Champions League, UEFA Europa League and UEFA Europa Conference League, if at least an Italian team is involved.
- All Six Nations matches involving Italy
- Semi-finals and finals of the FIBA World Championship, Waterpolo World Championship, Volleyball World Championship and Rugby World Cup if Italy is involved
- F1 Italian Grand Prix and MotoGP Italian motorcycle Grand Prix
- The Giro d'Italia
- The final and semi-finals of the Davis Cup and Fed Cup if Italy are involved

World Cycling Championship Olympics and Giro may be broadcast partially for free due to their length.

== Thailand ==
In November 2012, the National Broadcasting and Telecommunications Commission (NBTC) approved draft "must-have" regulations, requiring designated events to be carried by free-to-air channels:

- Olympic Games
- Paralympic Games
- Asian Games
- Asian Para Games
- Southeast Asian Games
- ASEAN Para Games
- FIFA World Cup Final

== United Kingdom ==
The Ofcom Code on Sports and Other Listed and Designated Events regulates that coverage of certain major sporting events (known as "Category A" events, covering certain major domestic events and major international competitions such as the Olympics and FIFA World Cup) must be broadcast primarily on a free-to-air channel (but can share coverage with pay channels), while certain events known as "Category B" events can be shown on pay channels, but supplemental coverage (such as highlights or a delayed broadcast) must be provided by a free-to-air channel.

== United States ==
In the early days of cable television, the Federal Communications Commission refused to regulate it. In 1958 the FCC ruled that cable TV was not a common carrier and thus is not subject to FCC jurisdiction. In 1960 the FCC lobbied against placing cable TV under its jurisdiction, arguing that the administrative burden is inadequate to low perceived threats of unchecked cable development. In 1965 the FCC changed its stance and imposed must-carry rules, requiring cable providers to carry local free-to-air channels, and banned importation of distant channels that duplicated content available on local free-to-air channels.

In the early 1960s, the Federal Communications Commission implemented "the anti-siphoning rules" pertaining to the availability of theatrical motion pictures for broadcast pay TV. The first trial of the technical and commercial feasibility of this business was in Hartford, Connecticut. The three major broadcast networks and National Association of Theatre Owners convinced the FCC to implement regulations that provided theatrical motion pictures would only be made available for exhibition on pay-TV prior to two years after the initial theatrical release and after 10 years from the initial theatrical release date.

This restriction had the effect of banning movies from being distributed via pay TV during an 8-year period. Inasmuch as movies typically derived nearly 100% of their revenues during an 18-month period from initial theatrical release, the availability of such movies were limited to a six-month prior to the second anniversary of their initial theatrical release date.

In the end of the 1960s the public and the government raised concerns that cable operators can outbid free-to-air channels and "siphon" popular content, first of all sports, off the free air. Specific events like the Super Bowl were deemed particularly vulnerable due to greater inelasticity of demand.

In 1975 the FCC imposed anti-siphoning regulations that limited the operations of sports and film channels. Under the regulations, cable channels could not devote more than 90% of their time to film and sports, and could not broadcast films less than three years old. Specific (i.e. annual) sporting events could not be "siphoned off" by cable at all if they had been broadcast on free airwaves during any of the previous five years. Cable coverage of regular season games in popular championships was limited so that only a fraction of all games could be shown on cable. Should sports coverage on free-to-air channels decrease, stipulated the FCC, cable operators had to decrease their sports programming proportionately. Administrative record, however, did not support FCC allegations of "siphoning".

The Department of Justice and a number of cable providers contested the FCC ruling in courts as unconstitutional. In 1977 the DC Circuit Court consolidated these cases in Home Box Office vs. FCC and found that the FCC trespassed over the rights guaranteed by the First Amendment. The court ruled that cable bandwidth, unlike broadcast spectra, is not a scarce resource, thus it is not subject to limitations allowed by the Red Lion vs. FCC ruling. The court applied the O'Brien test (the FCC failed two of its four "prongs") and found that the degree of limitation of free speech imposed by the FCC was inadequate, "grossly overboard" and thus "arbitrary, capricious and unconstitutional".

In recent years, a growing number of major domestic and international sporting events previously aired by free-to-air channels have migrated to pay-TV outlets. Since 2007, excluding the World Series, Major League Baseball's postseason playoffs have largely moved to cable, while ESPN airs the majority of bowl games of college football (including the College Football Playoff and National Championship, and those owned and operated by its subsidiary ESPN Events). Starting in 2025, all tennis Grand Slams are aired exclusively on pay television -- ESPN with the Australian Open, U. S. Open, and Wimbledon, and TNT with the French Open.

The majority of regional broadcasts in major leagues are now shown primarily by regional sports networks (with relatively few or no games broadcast on local free-to-air TV unless it is either nationally televised or only aired over-the-air due to RSN rights conflicts. In 2021, a new television deal between the National Hockey League and Turner Sports will place three of the next seven Stanley Cup Final exclusively on TNT during odd-numbered years (the others aired in even-numbered years will be aired by ABC).

In 2023, Major League Soccer shifted to a streaming-oriented broadcasting model, with all matches streaming on the Apple TV app and MLS Season Pass subscription, leaving a limited linear television package for Fox Sports.

In 2023, the Phoenix Suns became the first team in the NBA to put all regionally televised games on free-to-air, with Gray Television stations in Arizona becoming the primary broadcaster starting in 2023. The Utah Jazz were the second to follow with a new syndication deal with KJZZ-TV and other Sinclair Broadcasting stations in Utah and the Mountain West areas. The Suns' local ratings rose 69% with the move to Gray and Jazz ratings rose 39% with the Sinclair local stations. Meanwhile, the Portland Trail Blazers, which uses an RSN for all games, had ratings crash 60% during the season.

Ratings for the College Football Playoff, the NASCAR Cup Series championship, tennis majors, and PGA's Open Championship have suffered from the siphoning to ESPN. NASCAR's 2015-24 television contract with Comcast's NBCUniversal for NBC and their cable network USA Network during the second half of the season required the broadcast of the championship race to be on NBC, where in previous years it solely aired on ESPN. Likewise, golf's The Open Championship returned to network television in 2016, with weekend coverage on NBC and early round coverage on Golf Channel. Both the Premier League and The Open are unique in that network television coverage is available in the United States, while coverage in their home country (barring highlights) is limited to pay television (which also includes the Comcast-owned pay TV provider Sky).

The merger of Warner Bros. Discovery and Paramount Skydance (Skydance Corporation)) has created potential opportunities for the 2027 Stanley Cup Final, French Open finals, and NASCAR In-Season Tournament to be moved from TNT to CBS. Another proposed change is for Skydance to move the NCAA Men's Final Four for the entirety of their television deal (runs to 2032, but may be extended to 2033) from the WBD channels in even-numbered years to CBS entirely.

=== National Football League ===
The National Football League implements an anti-siphoning policy as part of its television contracts. The majority of Sunday games are broadcast on over-the-air television by either CBS or Fox in order to reach the largest audience possible, although the games broadcast during the main afternoon windows are determined by the viewer's region, and viewers must purchase the out-of-market sports package NFL Sunday Ticket (which is carried exclusively by YouTube TV) in order to view games that are not shown in their region. Certain flagship games are also broadcast nationally on network television, including NBC's weekly Sunday Night Football, as well as the three annual Thanksgiving Day games, and the entirety of the post-season.

ESPN's Monday Night Football, Amazon Prime Video's Thursday Night Football, as well as selected games exclusively aired by NFL Network, ESPN+, or Peacock, are only televised nationally on pay television or subscription-based streaming . In these cases, NFL rules require simulcasts of the games to be syndicated to television stations within the home markets of the teams that are participating. This ensures that the games are still available on broadcast TV in the local markets, whilst maintaining cable exclusivity for the games outside of the market. Beginning in 2014, ESPN has also held rights to a post-season wild card game; in the first year of this arrangement, the game was only simulcast in the markets of the teams involved, as with its other games. However, in 2015, ESPN began to simulcast the game on ABC (which returned the NFL to the network for the first time since Super Bowl XL) instead. ESPN later gained the right to simulcast selected regular season Monday Night Football games on ABC beginning in 2020, as well as air doubleheaders with simultaneous games split between the two channels.

The Thursday Night Football package previously aired exclusively on NFL Network. The package generated a major controversy in December 2007, due to a Saturday-night game in the package between the New England Patriots and New York Giants, where the Patriots were vying to become the first team since 1972 to have completed the regular season with a perfect record. At the time, NFL Network was not carried by all major television providers (Comcast and Time Warner Cable insisted that they be able to carry NFL Network on a sports tier), and concerns were expressed by critics, such as then Senator John Kerry, that the "historic" game would not be available to the majority of viewers outside of the teams' markets (where the game was to air on WWOR-TV, WCVB-TV, and WMUR-TV) if it were not nationally televised on broadcast television. The NFL compromised by allowing CBS and NBC to simulcast the game, in addition to the three team market stations and NFL Network; commissioner Roger Goodell stated that the decision was "in the best interest of our fans." The arrangement did generate some controversy among broadcasters; WWOR owner Fox Television Stations and WCVB/WMUR owner Hearst-Argyle Television argued that the simulcast devalued what would have been their exclusive local rights.

In 2014, as part of an overall effort to increase the prominence of the Thursday games, several of the games began to be broadcast and co-produced by CBS, in simulcast with NFL Network. In the 2016 and 2017 seasons, this block of games began to be split between CBS and NBC, but moved to Fox in 2018. In the 2022 season, Prime Video assumed exclusive rights to Thursday Night Football; the games can be streamed on Amazon-owned live streaming platform Twitch, and are syndicated to home market stations as per NFL rules for pay television broadcasters.
