= Columbia (1899 yacht) =

Racing yacht

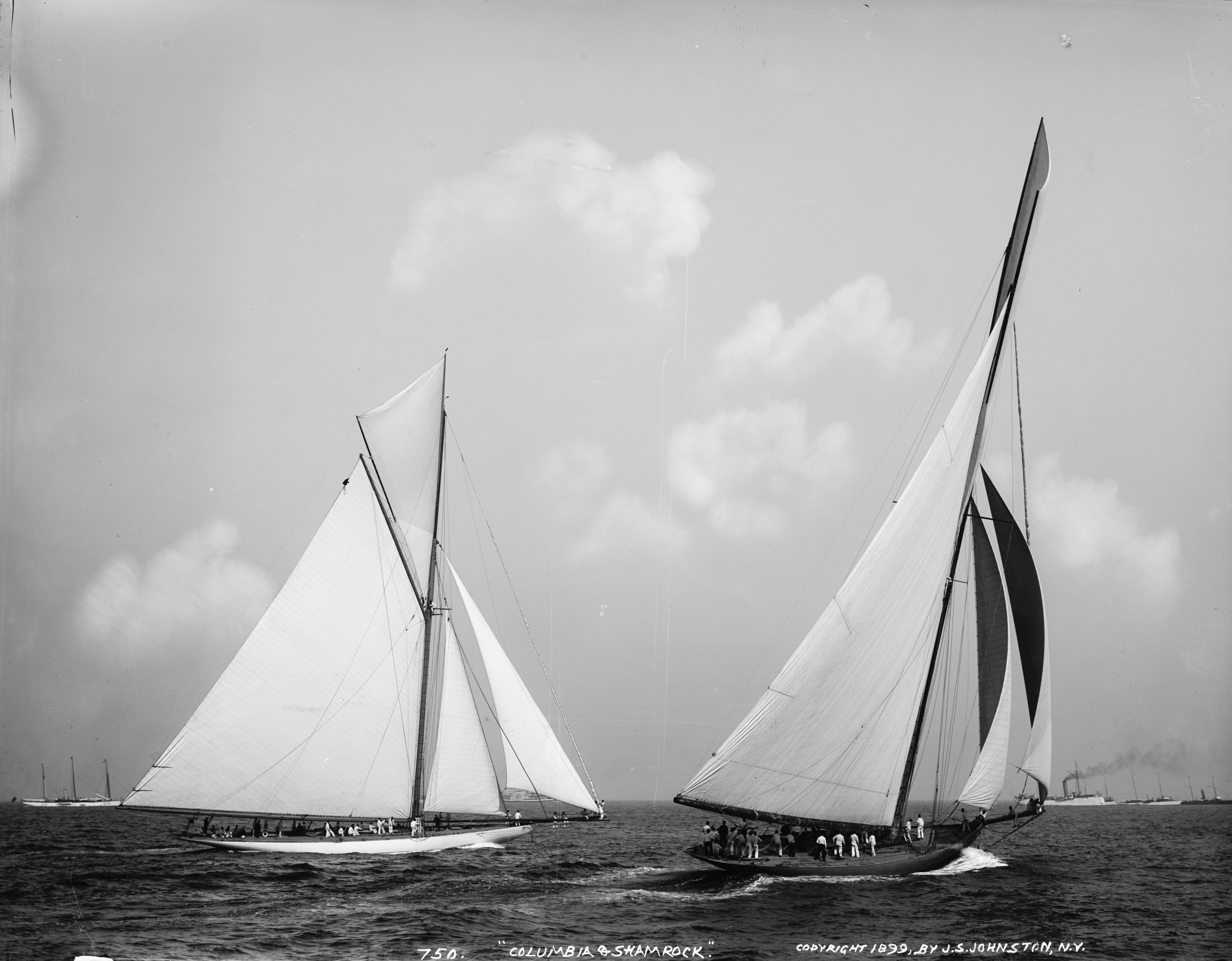
- Columbia vs. Shamrock, 1899
- Yacht club: New York Yacht Club
- Nation: United States
- Designer(s): Nathanael Greene Herreshoff
- Builder: Herreshoff Manufacturing Company
- Launched: June 10, 1899
- Owner(s): J. Pierpont Morgan and Edwin Dennison Morgan
- Fate: Broken up in 1915

Racing career
- Skippers: Charlie Barr
- Notable victories: 1899 America's Cup; 1901 America's Cup
- America's Cup: 1899, 1901

Specifications
- Displacement: 148.7 tonnes
- Length: 40.15 m (131.7 ft) LOA; 27.25 m (89.4 ft) LWL
- Beam: 7.39 m (24.2 ft)
- Draft: 5.97 m (19.6 ft)
- Sail area: 1,189 m^{2} (12,800 sq ft)

Columbia was an American racing yacht built in 1899 for the America's Cup races. She was the defender of the tenth America's Cup race that same year against British challenger Shamrock as well as the defender of the eleventh America's Cup race in 1901 against British challenger Shamrock II. She was the first vessel to win the trophy twice in a row (a record not equaled until Intrepid's back-to-back wins in 1967 and 1970.)

== Design ==
Columbia, a fin keel sloop, was designed and built in 1898-99 by Nathanael Herreshoff and the Herreshoff Manufacturing Company for owners J. Pierpont Morgan and Edwin Dennison Morgan of the New York Yacht Club. She was the third successful defender built by Herreshoff.

Columbia had a nickel steel frame, a tobin bronze hull, and a steel mast (later replaced with one of Oregon pine.)

== Career ==
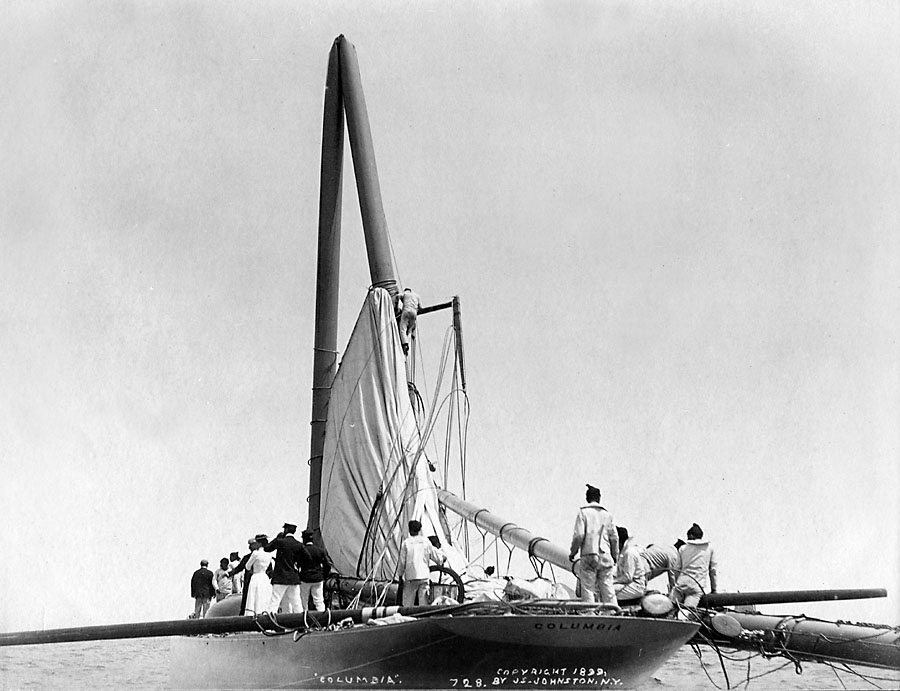
Columbia, dismasted, 1899. Photograph by John S. Johnston.

Columbia was launched on June 10, 1899. She easily won the elimination trials against the rebuilt former defender, Defender. Skippered by Charlie Barr, she won all three races against the British challenger, Shamrock, in the 1899 America's Cup. Notably, Hope Goddard Iselin was the only female on the crew, serving as afterguard.

Columbia was selected again in 1901 to defend the Cup, and again under the command of Charlie Barr, won all three races against Shamrock II.

In 1903 Columbia was refitted with the hope of being selected for a third time, but she was badly beaten in the selection trials by the yacht Reliance.

Columbia was broken up in 1915 at City Island and sold to Henry A. Hitner's Sons Company of Philadelphia, Pennsylvania for scrap. Today, the mast sits in the Forest Hills Gardens neighborhood of New York City in a park known as "Flagpole Green."

== References and external links ==
- America's Cup's Ac-clopaedia
- The 19th Century Yacht Photography of J.S. Johnston
- Hope Iselin - 32nd America's Cup
