= 1899 Kentucky Derby =

Horse race

25th Kentucky Derby
- Kentucky Derby
- Grade I stakes race
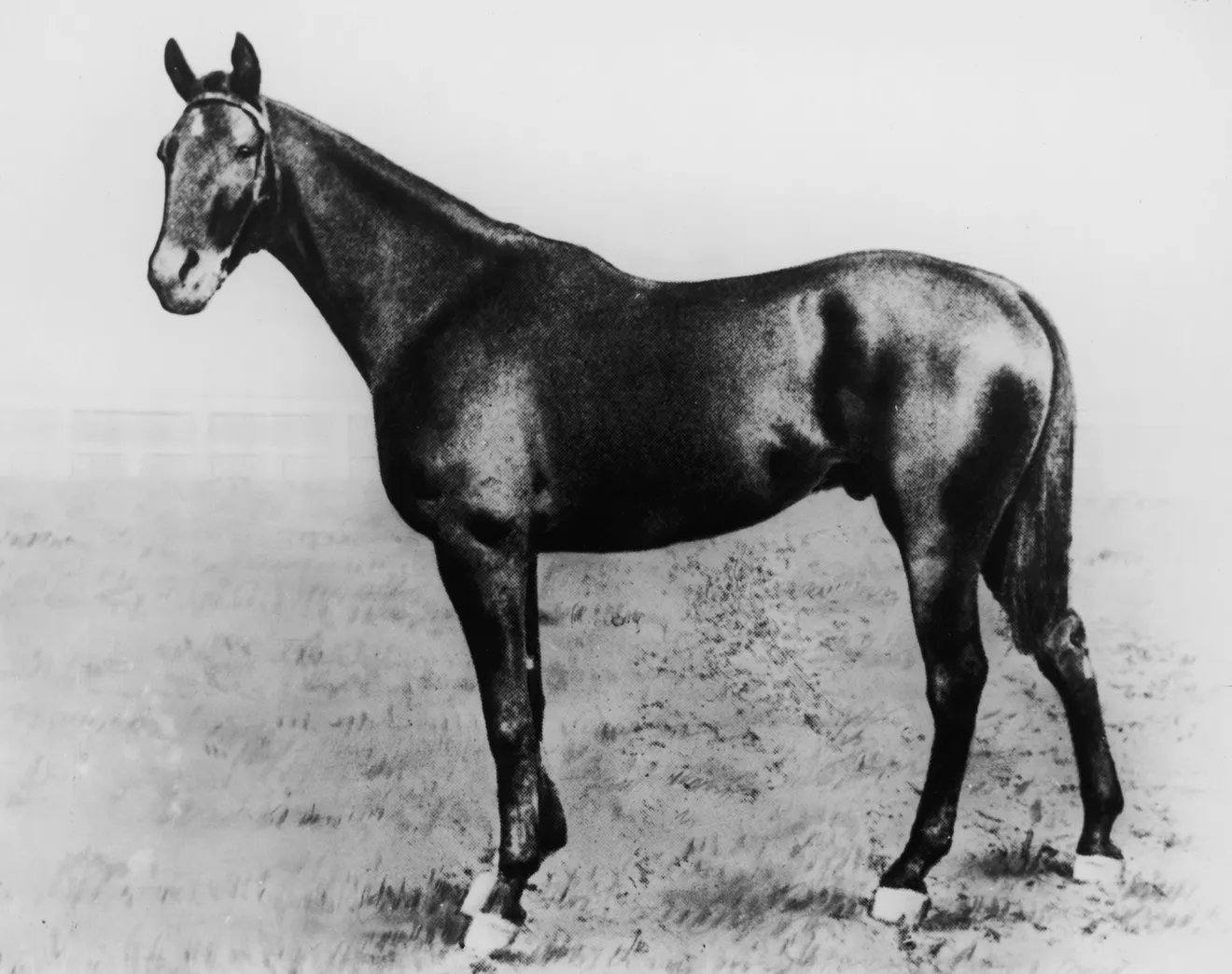
- Manuel, winner of the 1899 Kentucky Derby
- Location: Churchill Downs
- Date: May 4, 1899
- Winning horse: Manuel
- Jockey: Fred Taral
- Trainer: Robert J. Walden
- Owner: Alfred Hennen Morris; Dave Hennen Morris
- Surface: Dirt

The 1899 Kentucky Derby was the 25th running of the Kentucky Derby. The race took place on May 4, 1899.

== Full results ==
Finished	Post	Horse	Jockey	Trainer	Owner	Time / behind
1st		Manuel	Fred Taral	Robert J. Walden	A.H. & D.H. Morris	2:12.00
2nd		Corsini	Tommy Burns	Henry Gehardy	Edward Corrigan	2
3rd		Mazo	Jess Conley		John E. Madden	1 1/2
4th		His Lordship	Nash Turner		J. D. Smith	6
5th		Fontainebleu	Alfred "Monk" Overton		J. M. Forsythe	3

- Winning Breeder: Bashford Manor Stud; (KY)

== Payout ==
- The winner received a purse of $4,850.
- Second place received $700.
- Third place received $300.
